= Las Vegas Art Museum =

Former art museum in Nevada

Coordinates: 36.14526°N 115.30629°W

The Las Vegas Art Museum was an art museum in Las Vegas, Nevada. It was formerly located in a building shared with the Sahara West Library branch of the Las Vegas-Clark County Library District in Las Vegas, NV. The museum closed in 2009.

The Las Vegas Art Museum was "dedicated to engaging visitors in the international culture of contemporary art." The museum provided the public with publications, lectures, educational and outreach programs. It also developed a significant permanent collection of contemporary art.

== History ==
The Las Vegas Art Museum was the first fine-arts museum in southern Nevada.

In 1950, a group created the Las Vegas Art League with the intention of bringing fine art to the city. The Art League moved into a portion of a ranch house at Lorenzi Park which was purchased by the City of Las Vegas in 1949.

In 1974, the Las Vegas Art League changed its name to Las Vegas Art Museum which made it the first fine arts museum in Nevada.

The museum was orphaned in the mid 1990s, when the City of Las Vegas announced it needed its space to make way for an expanded senior center to service the neighborhood surrounding the park. It was invited to share the yet-to-be-built Sahara Library and Fine Art Museum in the new Peccole Ranch subdivision, but it had to reside in a temporary space provided by the Earnest Becker Family until the building was finished in 1997.

When it first opened, it scheduled a variety of exhibitions from Dale Chihuly and Marc Chagall to Auguste Rodin while it was briefly affiliated with the Smithsonian Institution.

In 2006, the museum rededicated itself to exhibiting and collecting contemporary fine art and design under its Director Dr. Libby Lumpkin and its board of trustees.

Under Dr. Lumpkin, the Las Vegas Art Museum exhibited a survey of paintings by Michael Reafsnyder and work by important Southern California-based minimalists including Robert Irwin, Larry Bell and James Turrell. Cindy Wright and Martin Mull also exhibited at the museum along with architectural models by Frank Gehry and sculpture by Kaz Oshiro.

The Las Vegas Art Museum celebrated Las Vegas Diaspora: The Emergence of Contemporary Art from the Neon Homeland curated by Dave Hickey from Sept. 30 to Dec. 30, 2007. The exhibit featured a selection of works by 26 artists who studied with Dave Hickey from 1990 to 2001 when he taught art theory and criticism in the Department of Art at the University of Nevada, Las Vegas. Participating artists include: Rev. Ethan Acres, Robert Acuna, Philip Argent, Aaron Baker, Tim Bavington, Thomas Burke, Jane Callister, Bradley Corman, Jacqueline Ehlis, Curtis Fairman, Gajin Fujita, Sush Machida Gaikotsu, James Gobel, Sherin Guirguis, Jack Hallberg, James Hough, Shawn Hummel, Carrie Jenkins, Angela Kallus, Wayne Littlejohn, Victoria Reynolds, David Ryan, Jason Tomme, Sean Slattery, Yek and Almond Zigmund.

Lumpkin also created the 702 Series that features solo exhibition by artists who were born and raised in Las Vegas, who initiated careers in Las Vegas, or who presently live and work in our city who represent Las Vegas in the broader national and international communities.

The 702 Series has featured exhibits by Sush Machida Gaikotsu and Stephen Hendee.

The museum had started as an affiliate of the Smithsonian Institution. This affiliation was ended in 2007.

The museum closed its doors to the public on February 28, 2009, citing falling donations. In 2012, the Las Vegas Art Museum collection moved to the newly renovated Marjorie Barrick Museum of Art, as part of a partnership between it and the University of Nevada, Las Vegas. The Las Vegas-Clark County Library now operates the former museum space at the Sahara West branch as separate art galleries.
