= Siri Engberg =

American writer, curator, editor (born 1967)

- Education: Lawrence University, 1989
- Occupation: Curator of visual arts
- Years active: 1990–present
- Employer: Walker Art Center

Siri Engberg is curator of visual arts at the Walker Art Center in Minneapolis, Minnesota. She wrote or edited a number of catalogues raisonnés, often with the artist's participation. Engberg organized about a half dozen shows before becoming assistant and then curator, which allowed her to curate several large touring shows and other major exhibitions.

== Early career ==
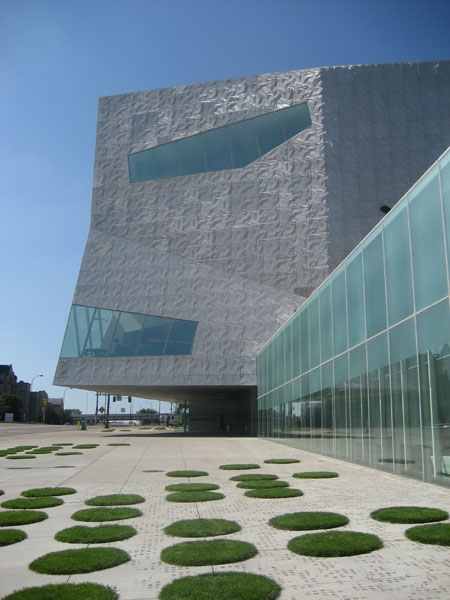
Walker Art Center in Minneapolis

In 1989, Engberg earned a bachelor's degree in art history and English at Lawrence University in Appleton, Wisconsin before joining the staff of the Walker Art Center in 1990, where she is an expert on works on paper. There she organized solo shows for Claes Oldenburg, Ellsworth Kelly, Robert Motherwell, Joan Mitchell, and Donald Judd.

In 1998 as an assistant curator, Engberg curated Meredith Monk in what The New York Times described as a retrospective show, Art Performs Life: Merce Cunningham/Meredith Monk/Bill T. Jones. She co-curated a theme show in 2000 called The Home Show. In 2007, Philippe Vergne and Engberg provided curatorial coordination for Picasso and American Art organized by the Whitney Museum of American Art in New York.

She curated Paper Trail: A Decade of Acquisitions (2007), 1964 (2010), and Recollection: Lorna Simpson (2010). She also curated four major touring exhibitions: Frank Stella at Tyler Graphics (1997), Edward Ruscha: Editions 1959-1999 (1999), Chuck Close: Self-Portraits 1967-2005 (2005, with Madeleine Grynsztejn), and Kiki Smith: A Gathering 1980-2005 (2005). In 2008, Smith gave Selections from Animal Skulls (1995) to the Walker, a gift in honor of Engberg.

With Rosemary Furtak, Engberg co-curated Text/Messages: Books by Artists (December 18, 2008 – April 19, 2009). She curated From Here to There: Alec Soth’s America in 2010.

Engberg guest-curated Excavations: The Prints of Julie Mehretu which originated at the Highpoint Center for Printmaking in Minneapolis, Minnesota, and traveled to the Herbert F. Johnson Museum of Art at Cornell University in Ithaca, New York, and Davison Art Center at Wesleyan University in Middletown, Connecticut, and the Frances Lehman Loeb Art Center at Vassar College in Poughkeepsie, New York.

Engberg was coordinating curator for Cindy Sherman, organized by the Museum of Modern Art, New York, (February 26 to June 11, 2012), which then traveled to the San Francisco Museum of Modern Art (July 14-October 7, 2012), to the Walker Art Center (November 10, 2012 – February 17, 2013), and the Dallas Museum of Art (March 17-June 9, 2013).

== Lifelike ==
At the Walker Art Center, Engberg curated Lifelike (2012), a group show of "uncannily realistic" works, often "painstakingly rendered". Yesomi Umolu is a curatorial fellow who helped to create the exhibition. More than 90 objects were exhibited by 50 artists, among them: Yoshihiro Suda, Ai Weiwei, Vija Celmins, Evan Penny, Jeon Joonho, Rudolf Stingel, Paul Sietsema, Susan Collis, Thomas Demand, Robert Gober, Fischli & Weiss, Tauba Auerbach, Maurizio Cattelan, Robert Therrien, Keith Edmier, Leandro Erlich, Isaac Layman, Ron Mueck, Charles Ray, Peter Rostovsky, James Casebere, Catherine Murphy, Alex Hay, Peter Rostovsky, David Lefkowitz, Ruben Nusz, Andy Warhol and Kaz Oshiro.

"Trompe l’oeil is the hook that draws us in," Engberg told ARTnews: "Then comes the moment of the uncanny—what am I really looking at?...."

The exhibition opened at the Walker (February 25, 2012 – May 27, 2012) and then traveled to the New Orleans Museum of Art (November 10, 2012 – January 27, 2013), the Museum of Contemporary Art, San Diego (February 24–May 26, 2013), and Blanton Museum of Art in Austin, Texas (June 23–September 29, 2013).

== 2013 to the present ==
Engberg served as Walker coordinating curator for Claes Oldenburg: The Sixties, organized in 2013 by MUMOK (Museum Moderner Kunst Stiftung Ludwig Wien) in Vienna. The show traveled first to Museum Ludwig in Cologne; the Guggenheim Museum Bilbao in Spain; and the Museum of Modern Art in New York, before showing at the Walker.

Hopper Drawing: A Painter's Process (2013–2014) was organized by the Whitney Museum of American Art where it showed first, and then it travelled to the Dallas Museum of Art and to the Walker, where Engberg served as coordinating curator.

== Books ==
Engberg is the editor of the exhibition catalog Lifelike (2012). She coauthored a number of books: Kiki Smith: A Gathering, 1980-2005 coauthored with Smith; Chuck Close: Self-Portraits 1967-2005 coauthored with Close and Madeleine Grynsztejn; Frank Stella at Tyler Graphics coauthored with Stella; From Here to There: Alec Soth’s America; Edward/Ruscha: Editions, 1959-1999 coauthored with Ruscha, and Robert Motherwell: The Complete Prints 1940-1991: A Catalogue Raisonné coauthored with Motherwell and Joan Banach.
