= Galería OMR =

OMR
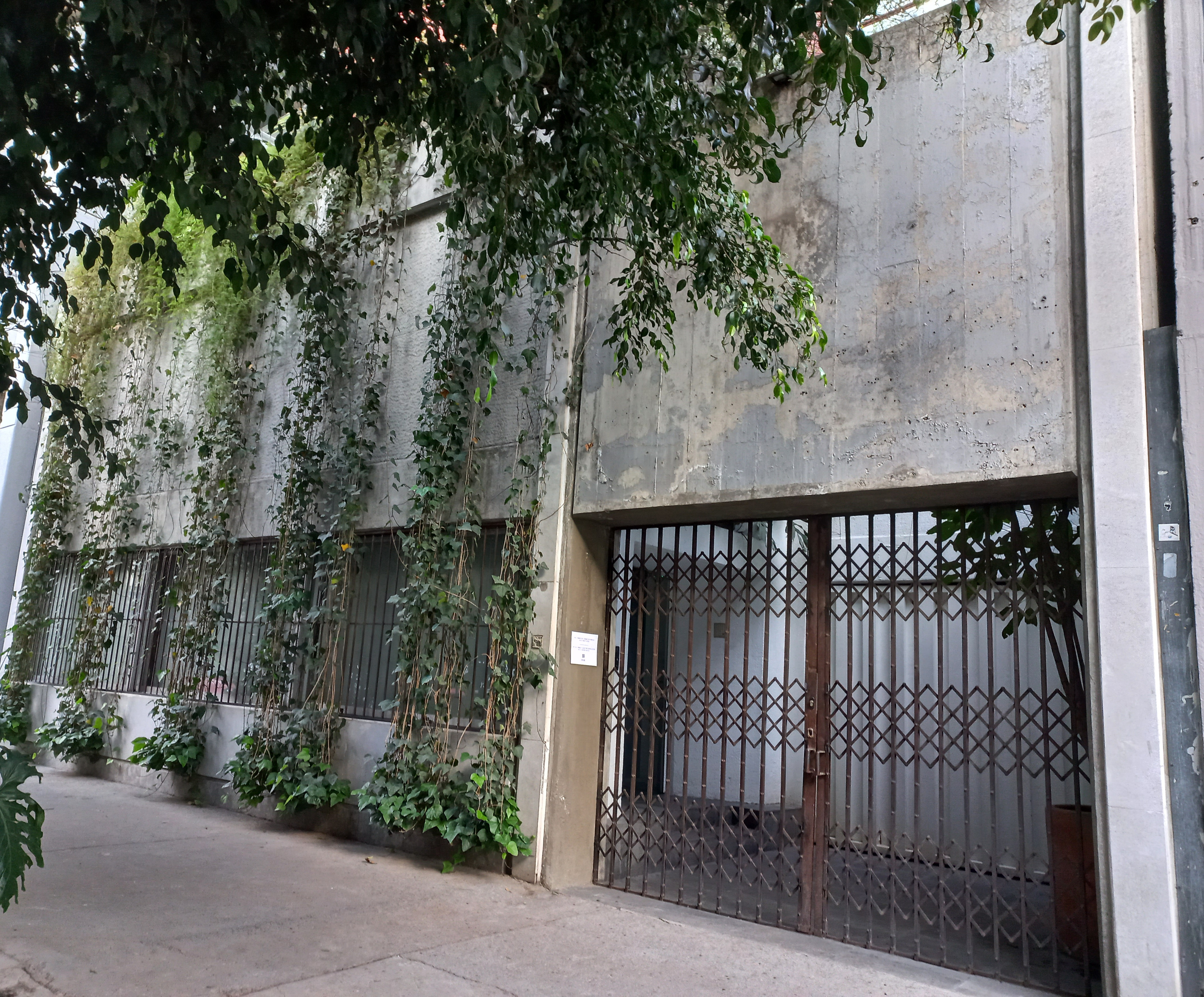
- Location in Mexico City
- Established: 1983
- Location: Córdoba 100, Roma Nte., Cuauhtémoc, 06700 Ciudad de México, Mexico
- Coordinates: 19.4190583°N 99.1606797°W
- Type: Contemporary art gallery
- Founders: Patricia Ortiz Monasterio and Jaime Riestra
- Architects: Mateo Riestra, José Arnaud-Bello and Max von Werz
- Owner: Cristobal Riestra
- Website: omr.art

OMR is a contemporary art gallery located in Mexico City.

== History ==
OMR was founded in 1983 by Patricia Ortiz Monasterio and Jaime Riestra. The gallery is located in the Roma district which is now recognized as the leading art scene area in Mexico City. The Observer wrote in August 2019 that OMR is "one of the city’s longest-running and largest blue-chip galleries" and noted that the majority of their buyers are "foreign collectors."

The gallery represents emerging and established contemporary artists, including Mexican artists Pia Camil and José Dávila, Swiss artist Claudia Comte, German artist Candida Höfer and the Danish artist group SUPERFLEX, among others. Since its beginning, OMR has been a major influence on the arts in Mexico, showing avant-garde artists that have now become some of the referential points of the Mexican art scene. Over the past four decades, OMR has presented more than 400 exhibitions and participated in numerous international art fairs, including Frieze Los Angeles, Zona MACO (Mexico) Art Basel (Switzerland) and Art Basel Miami Beach (USA).

In 2022, OMR co-founded the cultural center LagoAlgo. Housed in a historic modernist building in the Chapultepec Park (Mexico City's green lung), LagoAlgo is a free and public cultural destination, which aims to foster encounters between contemporary art, gastronomy and architecture. The exhibition program is under the creative direction of Jérôme Sans.
