= Where the Earth Meets the Sky =

Sculpture in Oklahoma City, Oklahoma, U.S.

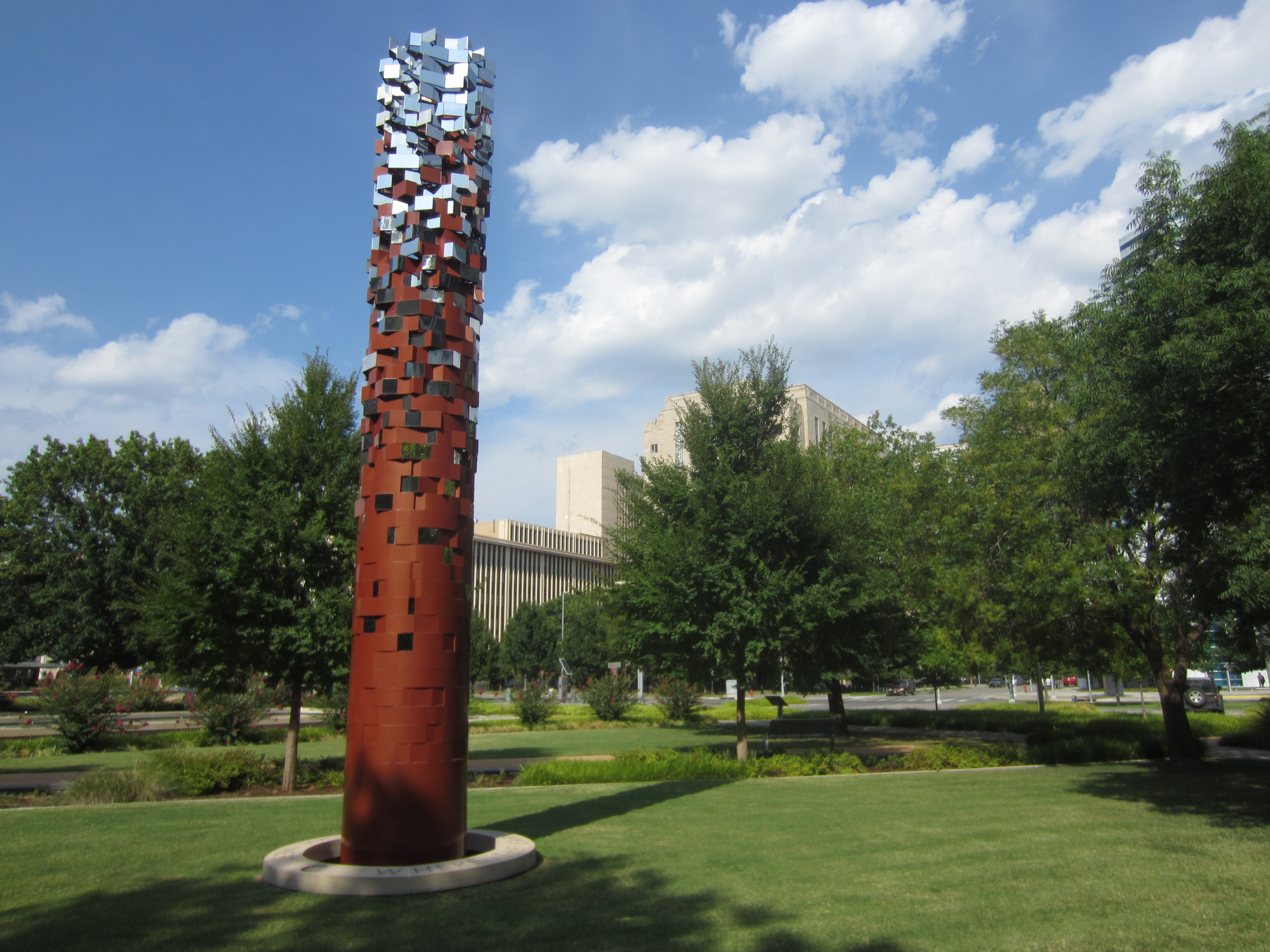
- The sculpture in 2019
- Artist: Phillip K. Smith III
- Year: 2012
- Dimensions: 7.9 m (26 ft)
- Location: Oklahoma City, Oklahoma, U.S.
- 35.468714°N 97.520324°W

Where the Earth Meets the Sky is a sculpture by Phillip K. Smith III, installed outside Oklahoma City's City Hall, in the U.S. state of Oklahoma.

== Description and history ==
The 26-foot (7.9 m) tall sculpture, installed in 2012, is made of powder coated steel, stainless steel, concrete, bronze, and LED lighting. The base is circular and red, and the sculpture becomes increasingly modular and reflective with height. Smith has said of the artwork:

In Oklahoma, the red earth and the expansive blue sky are the two natural elements that let me know I am in Oklahoma and nowhere else. Throughout the State’s proud history, the red soil has played a crucial role in the development of place. It has been staked and claimed, worked and tiled, excavated and drilled. All the while the big blue sky has served as the visual backdrop to this history. My creative intent with this sculpture is to merge the natural elements together by lifting the earth to the sky, and bringing the blue sky down to the earth.

The work is part of the City of Oklahoma City Public Art collection.

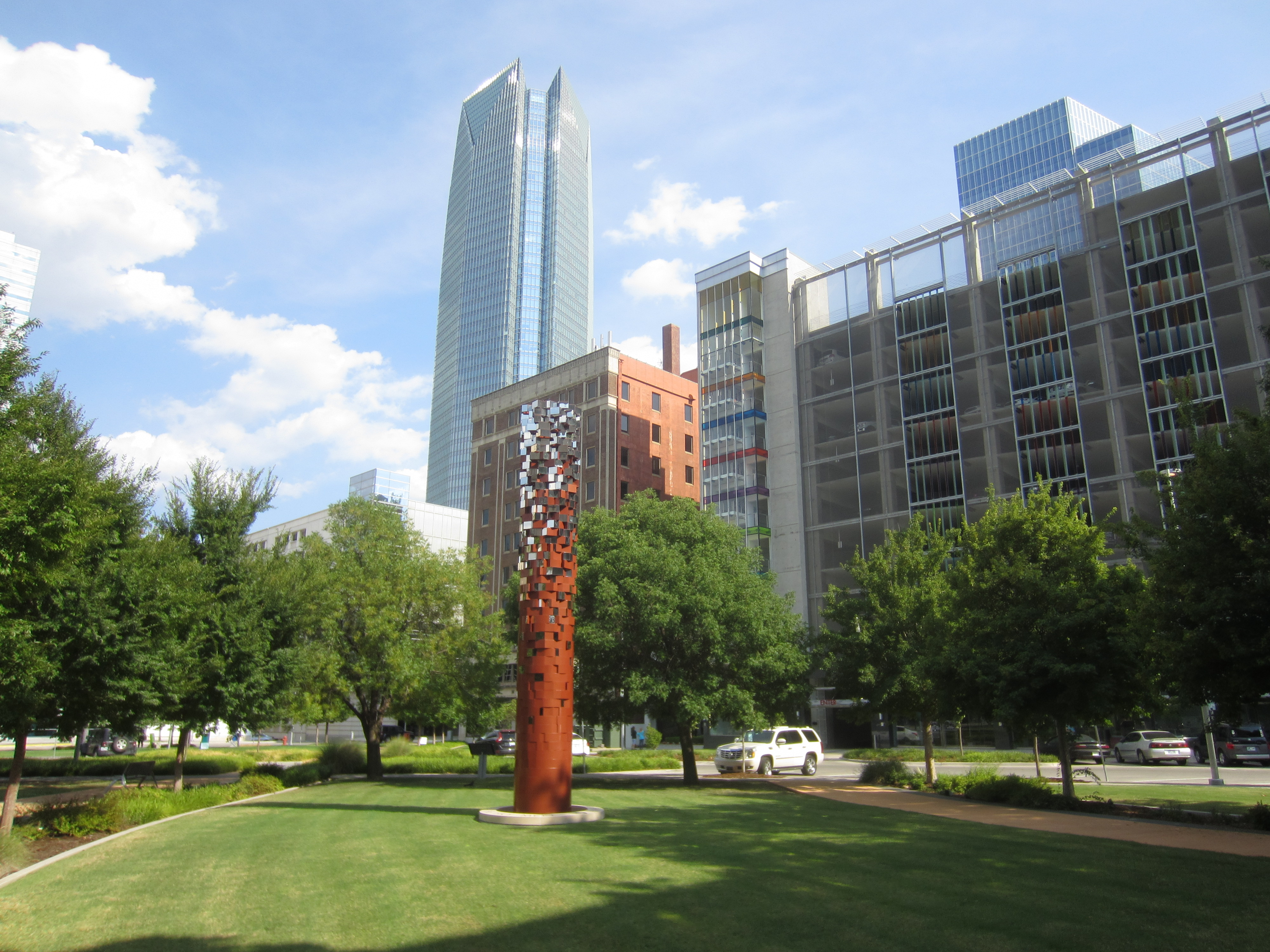
The sculpture, 2019

== See also ==
- 2012 in art
