= Desert X =

Contemporary art exhibition in California

- Genre: Contemporary art Site-specific art
- Dates: Desert X 2017: February 25 – April 30, 2017; Desert X 2019: February 9 – April 21, 2019; Desert X 2021: March 12 – May 16, 2021; Desert X 2023: March 4 – May 7, 2023 (planned)
- Location: Coachella Valley, California US
- Years active: 2017, 2019, 2021, 2023 (planned)
- Founders: Susan Davis
- Attendance: 650,000 (2021)
- Website: desertx.org

Desert X is a site-specific, contemporary art exhibition that is held in the Coachella Valley in Southern California. The inaugural Desert X was held from February 25 to April 30, 2017, and has held subsequent exhibitions every two years. The next planned exhibition is for March 4, 2023.

== Background ==
Desert X is the exhibition of Desert Biennial, a 501(c) charitable organization founded in 2015. The exhibition is meant to bring attention to the valley's environment through the display of works by emerging artists. Themes include climate change, immigration, tourism, gambling, and Native American culture.

=== 2017 ===
2017 was the inaugural exhibition year of Desert X. The exhibition opened on February 25, 2017 and ran through April 30. Participating artists included Doug Aitken, Lita Albuquerque, Jeffrey Gibson, Sherin Guirguis, Glann Kaino, Richard Prince, Rob Pruitt, Julião Sarmento, Phillip K. Smith III, and Tavares Strachan.

Works included a camouflaged house covered in mirrors, an autonomous vehicle known as the "ShyBot" that is programmed to avoid people, as well as an underground bunker with a kitsch sculpture of John F. Kennedy. In February 2017 the robot's creator, an Italian artist known as "Norma Jeane", lost contact with ShyBot. All communication was lost, and some thought the art robot was "bot-napped". In July 2018, an off-roader found ShyBot and through a QR code on the body was able to contact Desert X and facilitate her return.

=== 2019 ===
Desert X 2019 opened on February 9, 2019 and ran through April 21. Participating artists included Iván Argote, Nancy Baker Cahill, Cecilia Bengolea, Pia Camil, John Gerrard, Julian Hoeber, Jenny Holzer, Iman Issa, Mary Kelly, Armando Lerma, Eric N. Mack, Cinthia Marcelle, Postcommodity, Cara Romero, Sterling Ruby, Kathleen Ryan, Gary Simmons, Superflex, Chris Taylor & Steve Badgett. Neville Wakefield acted as artistic director.

=== 2021 ===
Desert X 2021 opened on March 12, 2021 and ran through May 16. The exhibition was curated by artistic director, Neville Wakefield and co-curated by César García-Alvarez. The exhibition explored the concept of the desert being both a place and idea, and featured artworks that acknowledged the realities of people who reside here and the political, social, and cultural contexts that shape their stories. Participating artists for Desert X 2021 included Zahrah Alghamdi, Ghada Amer, Felipe Baeza, Serge Attukwei Clottey, Nicholas Galanin, Alicja Kwade, Oscar Murillo, Christopher Myers, Eduardo Sarabia, Xaviera Simmons, and Vivian Suter.

The exhibition was among the first art experiences in the region since widespread lockdowns due to the COVID-19 pandemic to offer a safe, outdoor experience that was free and open to all. The exhibition had 650,000+ site visits Valley-wide in 9 weeks.

A documentary film, Desert X 2021 – The Film, was produced for KCET's ARTBOUND. Desert X 2021 – The Film took viewers inside the artists’ studios in Accra, Ghana; Berlin, Germany; Guadalajara, Mexico; Jeddah, Saudi Arabia; La Paila, Colombia; London, UK; New York City, USA; Panajachel, Guatemala; and Sitka, Alaska, USA. Through their creations for Desert X, the participating artists explore the current socio-political climate, speaking directly to the Native American Land Back movement, climate change and water rights, histories of feminism and the urgent issues facing Black lives.

Desert X's 2021 Official T-Shirt, the Desert X Coordinates Tee had an error that was never fixed in its production. The shirt's coordinates of longitude and latitude take you to the North Pacific Ocean. If a 3 is added to the start of the longitude you get the coordinates of Coachella Valley, where the exhibit took place.

== Select artists ==
- Doug Aitken
- Lita Albuquerque
- Cecilia Bengolea
- Nancy Baker Cahill
- Pia Camil
- Jeffrey Gibson
- Sherin Guirguis
- Glenn Kaino
- Richard Prince
- Rob Pruitt
- Julião Sarmento
- Phillip K Smith III
- Tavares Strachan
- Zahrah Alghamdi
- Ghada Amer
- Serge Attukwei Clottey
- Nicholas Galanin
- Alicja Kwade
- Oscar Murillo
- Christopher Myers

== Gallery ==
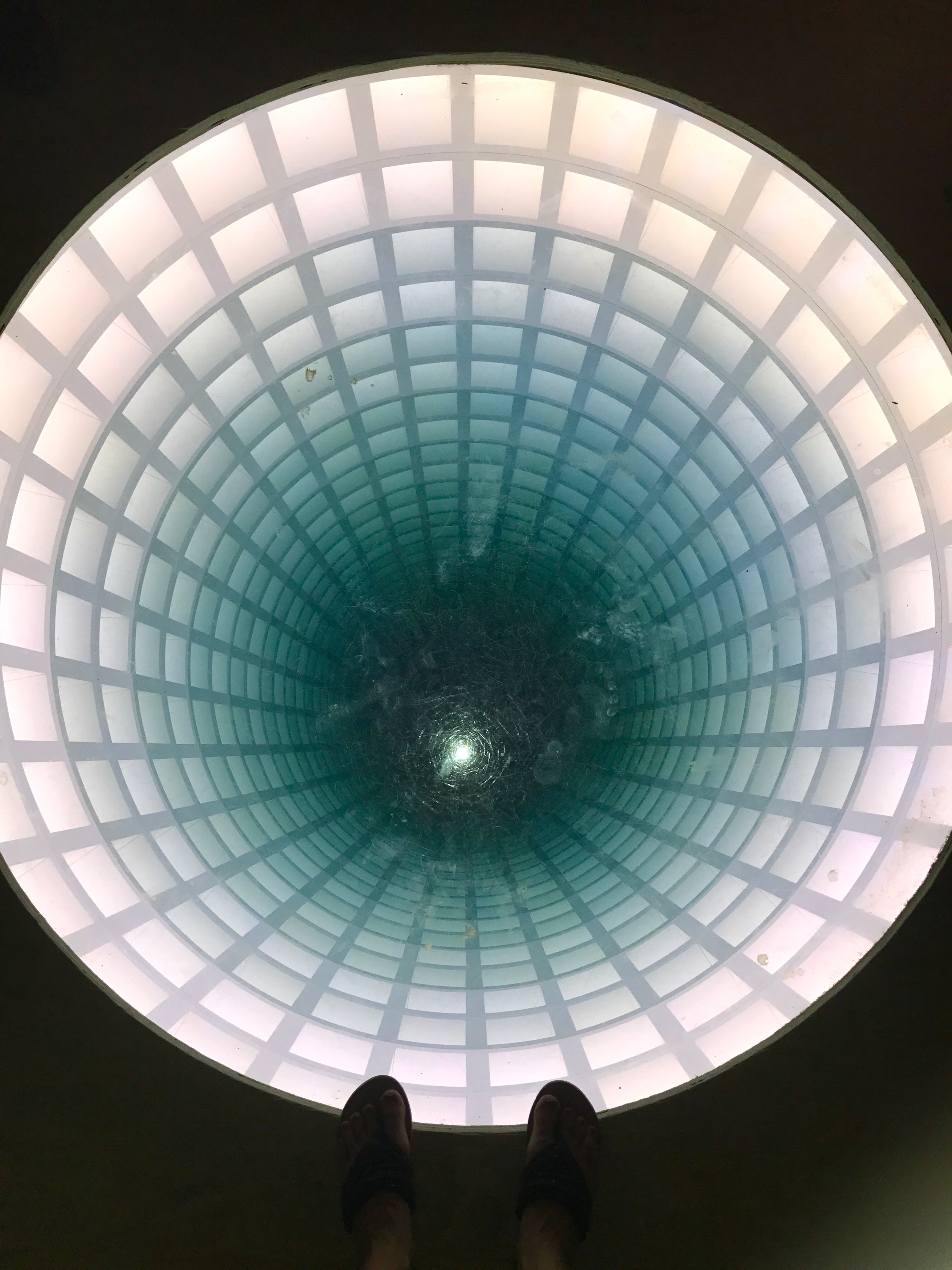
Hollow Earth by Glenn Kaino is an illuminated, glass-covered hole that creates the illusion of a tunnel descending deep into the Earth

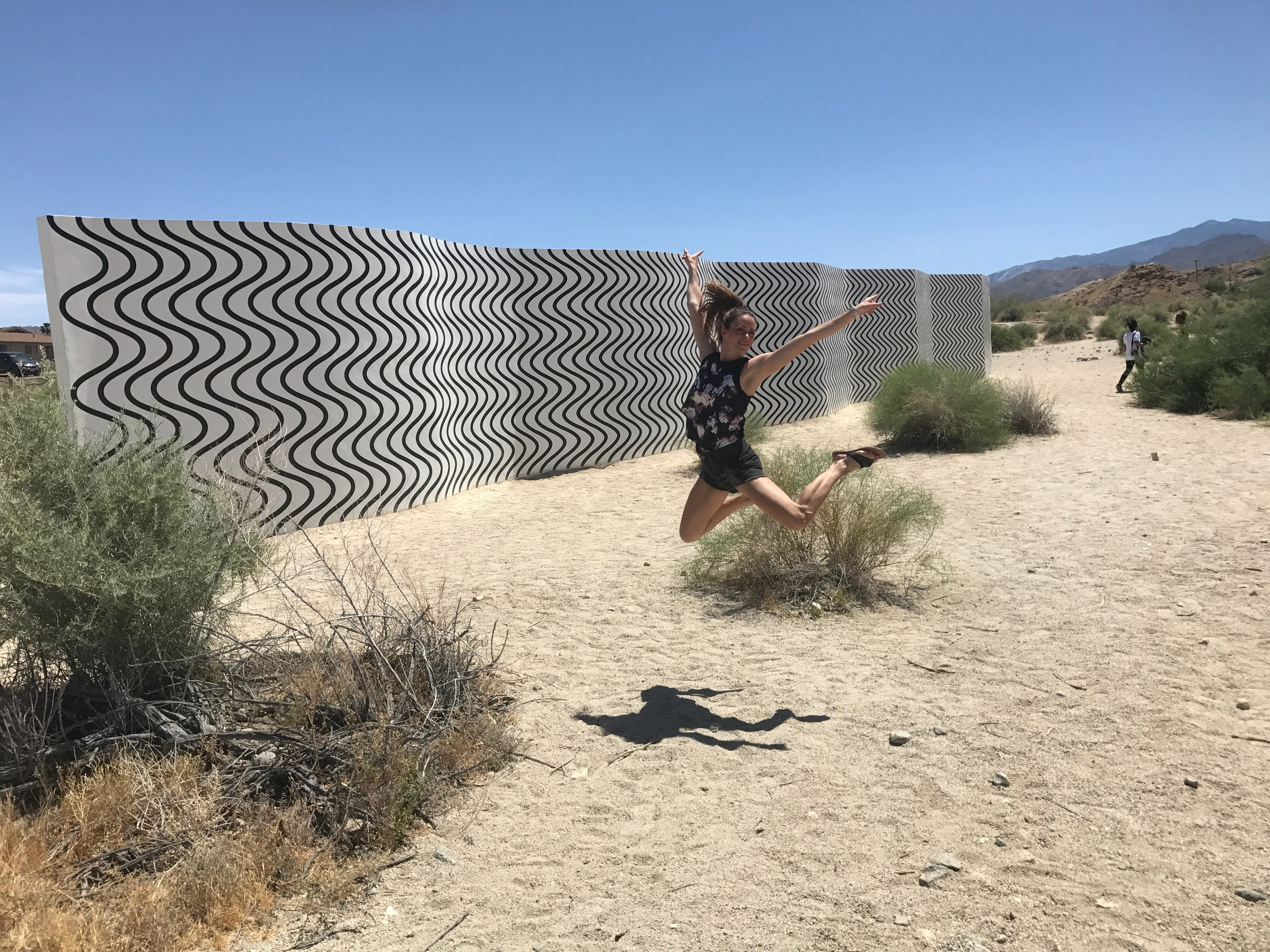
A spectator having fun at Curves and Zigzags by Claudia Comte

== See also ==
- Coachella Music Festival
- Palm Springs Art Museum
