= Glenn Kaino =

American artist

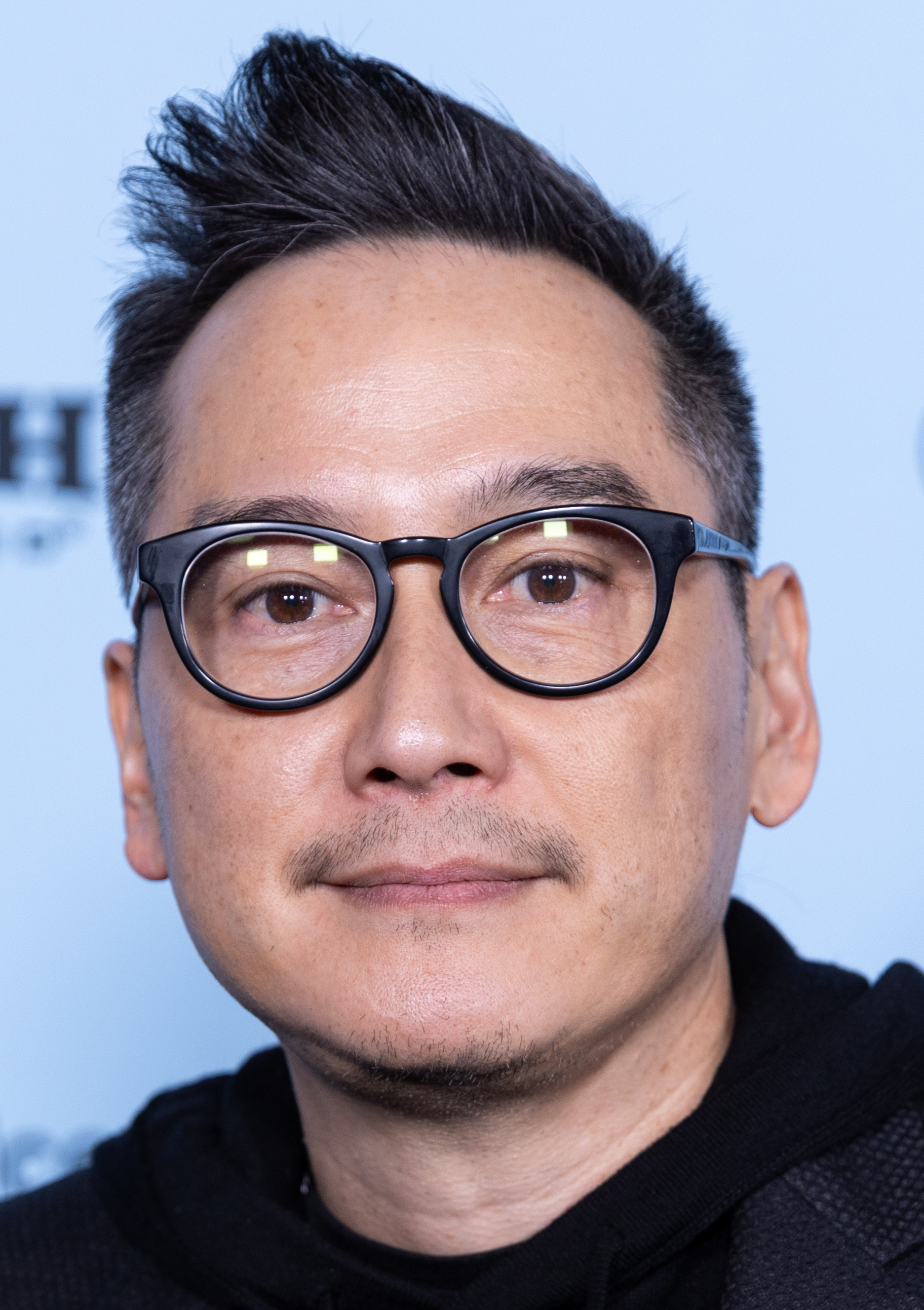
- Kaino at the 2025 Sundance Film Festival
- Born: 1972; Los Angeles
- Alma mater: University of California, San Diego; University of California, Irvine
- Occupation: Filmmaker

Glenn Akira Kaino (born 1972) is an American conceptual artist based in Los Angeles.

== Early life, education and artistic training ==
Kaino was born in Los Angeles. Kaino grew up in Cerritos and East Los Angeles; he is fourth-generation Japanese-American. He attended UC Irvine and received a BA in 1993 after which he attended UC San Diego where he completed an MFA in 1997.

Trained as a sculptor, Kaino came of age in the late 1980s – early 1990s, at the height of the culture wars. Working closely with teachers and mentors who at the time were engaged in a critically important reevaluation about the role of identity and politics in contemporary art, Kaino emerged as a member of the first generation of artists of color in the U.S. to begin to consider the ways through which contemporary art could be responsive to the conceptual turn while remaining faithful to the political project of artists and activists of prior decades.

== Early career ==
Developing his practice at the height of the Internet boom, Kaino began to explore ideas of systems as a way to bring distinct wisdoms and knowledge forms into the language of contemporary art. Informed by the process of kitbashing, akin to a model-maker's process of reassembling standard models and structures into new and innovative forms, Kaino began to approach his sculptural process as a form of conceptual kit-bashing—appropriating the languages, logics, production processes, and value systems of various fields of study to apply them to his artistic process as a way to consolidate improbable materials.

== Artwork ==
Kaino's work ranges across a wide range of media including drawing, painting, sculpture, video, and performance.

Kaino's most well-known works include Desktop Operations, a large-scale sand castle structure he debuted at the 2004 Whitney Biennial; In Revolution, a kinetic sculptural illusion encompassing a rapidly spinning Aeron chair that unveils the image of a chalice as it rotates inside its incubator; Untitled (Reverse Inverse Ninja Law), a large-scale levitating hammer sculpture made from thousands of small Zapatista dolls made through a collaboration with Zapatista activists in Chiapas; The Burning Boards, a sculptural moment first shown at the Whitney Museum at Altria that encompasses a chess tournament played with burning candles; Safe, a sculpture made from amassed secrets that visualizes secrecy in material form; Arch, a large-scale sculpture commissioned by the City of Pittsburgh and the Heinz Endowment; and In Every Grain, a sculptural environment in which he used air and sand to construct an ephemeral and temporary city-like sculpture for the US Pavilion at the 13th International Cairo Biennale in 2013, where he represented the US.

Kaino's most recent installation, Sails, was commissioned for Intuit Dome in Los Angeles, to be opened in August 2024.

Kaino's work has been exhibited internationally and is included in the collections of the Los Angeles County Museum of Art (LACMA); the Hammer Museum, Los Angeles, CA; the Museum of Contemporary Art San Diego; the Orange County Museum of Art (OCMA), Newport Beach, California; the Museum Folkwang Essen; and the Studio Museum in Harlem, New York City.

== Influences and collaborations ==
In addition to his studio practice, Kaino has collaborated with a wide range of organizations and companies on creative projects. An expansion of his ongoing interest in finding platforms in which art and creativity expand beyond the boundaries of the cultural institution, Kaino has worked with Universal Music Group on Farmclub.com and Napster 2.0.

Kaino has also helped create various experimental venues to support the work of other artists. Working with collaborators Daniel Joseph Martinez, Rolo Castillo, and Tracey Shiffman, Kaino co-founded the seminal artist-run gallery Deep River in Los Angeles in 1997. Throughout its five years of existence, it was a beacon for artists and experimental practices in Los Angeles. Kaino was also a founding board member of LA><ART and more recently he created the performance art duo A.Bandit with magician Derek DelGaudio.

== Exhibitions ==
- Transformer: The Art of Glenn Kaino at The Andy Warhol Museum, Pittsburgh, PA
- Simple System for Dimensional Transformation at The Project, NYC
- The Lost World at Rosamund Felsen Gallery, CA
- Bring Me The Hands of Piri Reis at Honor Fraser Gallery, Los Angeles, CA
- The Whitney Museum of American Art at Altria, New York City
- The Museum of Contemporary Art San Diego, San Diego, CA
- Performa09 (in collaboration with Creative Time), New York City
- REDCAT, Los Angeles, CA
- Safe|Vanish, LAXART, Los Angeles
- Levitating The Fair (The Flying Merchant Ship) for Art Public, Art Basel Miami Beach
- Experiments from The [Space] Between at The Kitchen, New York City
- Hollow Earth, Desert X, Coachella Valley
- “With Drawn Arms” at the High Museum of Art, Atlanta, Georgia
- "With Drawn Arms" at the San Jose Museum of Art, San Jose, California
- In the Light of a Shadow at Mass MoCA, North Adams, Massachusetts
- A Forest for the Trees, Los Angeles, California

== Awards and nominations ==
- California Community Foundation (CCF) Grant
- Smithsonian American Art Museum Nominee for Contemporary Artist Award, 2012
- Represented the US at the 13th annual Cairo Biennale, which ran from December 2012 to February 2013.

== Personal life ==
Glenn Kaino is married to fashion designer Corey Lynn Calter. They live in Los Angeles with their two daughters, Stella and Sadie, along with their dogs, Gilbert and Winston.
