= POSTmatter (magazine) =

Online art and culture magazine

POSTmatter is a London-based online magazine about contemporary art and culture in the digital age. It was founded in 2010 by Remi Paringaux, Alexander Dellal and Xerxes Cook as an iPad-only magazine named POST. The magazine has been edited by Louise Benson since 2014.

== Background ==
Early issues of POST magazine on the iPad were identified with a unique suffix; the first and second issues were titled 'POSTgravity' and 'POSTperformance'.

"POST offers a map for others to follow," The New York Times stated in May 2011.

The website was launched in 2013 under the name 'POSTmatter'. No further iPad editions were released following its launch, and POSTmatter was adopted as the official name of the online magazine.

== POSTmatter special projects ==
As part of the 54th Venice Biennale in 2011, POSTmatter created a physical pavilion and accompanying app titled ‘Commercial Break’ in partnership with Neville Wakefield and Dasha Zhukova. It featured the work of over 130 international artists, including Ari Marcopoulos, Aleksandra Mir, Raymond Pettibon, Cyprien Gaillard, Christian Jankowski and Agathe Snow.

POSTmatter worked with artist Doug Aitken in 2012 to create an app-based experience based on his large-scale multimedia production ‘ALTERED EARTH’, commissioned by the LUMA Foundation.

== POSTmatter exhibitions ==
In 2014, POSTmatter staged its first exhibition at the Accademia di Brera in Milan. A series of interactive installations were displayed, showing three fashion films that could be altered by human touch or movement.

One of these installations, 'Ripple', was exhibited again in 2015 at Fashion Space Gallery, London, as part of the exhibition 'Digital Disturbances'. POSTmatter presented a 3-part talk series at the London College of Fashion to accompany the exhibition.

In 2015, POSTmatter took part in fig-2 at the Institute of Contemporary Arts, London. An exhibition was curated by POSTmatter that brought together photography, sound and video works, while artists, writers and curators were invited to participate in live writing events that were published online.

== POSTmatter relaunch ==
POSTmatter relaunched with a new website in 2016. The British Journal of Photography stated in September 2016, "POSTmatter is at the forefront of re-enchanting the scope of the digital magazine, becoming an essential voice on life and culture in the digital age."
