= Nancy Baker Cahill =

American multidisciplinary artist

- Born: 1970 (age 55–56); Cambridge, Massachusetts, US
- Education: Williams College
- Known for: Augmented reality, virtual reality, drawing, video installation
- Movement: New media art
- Website: Nancy Baker Cahill

Nancy Baker Cahill (born 1970) is an American new media artist based in Los Angeles, California. She has created immersive augmented reality (AR) and virtual reality (VR) experiences, video installations and blockchain projects, oftentimes rooted in drawing. Her work frequently merges technology and public art, drawing upon both feminist land art and the history of political interventions to examine systemic power, body autonomy, civics and climate crisis, among other issues.

She is the founder and director of 4th Wall, a free AR public art platform focused on public engagement, critical social practice and site interventions.

== Education and career ==
Baker Cahill was born in Cambridge, Massachusetts and grew up in Boston. She received a BA in art from Williams College in 1992. After working at a Boston television station, she began her art career in Los Angeles in 2007.

Baker Cahill has exhibited extended reality works at the 2019 Desert X Biennial, Whitney Museum, Hammer Museum, Francisco Carolinum (Linz) and Kunsthalle Zürich. She was included in the public projects Sunset Digital Billboards (2018) and "Luminex: Dialogues of Light" (2021), an exhibition of digital projections mapped onto Los Angeles buildings. She has had featured exhibitions at the Pasadena Museum of California Art, Los Angeles Contemporary Exhibitions (LACE), Boston Cyberarts, the LUMA Foundation Elevation 1049 Biennial, and the Georgia Museum of Art (her first retrospective, "Through Lines," 2023).

In 2018, Baker Cahill founded 4th Wall, a free AR application 4th Wall provides a platform through which artists can exhibit virtual works to a wider audience and intervene in specific, outdoor public spaces through a geo-location feature. She and other artists have used it as a tool to mount public art exhibitions in AR at sites of cultural, historical and political significance.

== Work ==
Baker Cahill's early work centered on works on paper and videos that explored physical embodiment in an increasingly immersive manner. In the latter 2010s, she began creating 3D digital iterations of abstract drawings that suggested organic forms or forces in motion. In her later extended reality works, she often digitally transforms hand-drawn works on paper into sculptural, hybrid objects and moving animations that can be reinserted into the world as videos, prints, or illuminated projections.

=== Traditional work ===
Throughout Baker Cahill's career, drawing has been a foundational practice, extending across two- and three-dimensional, as well as VR and AR mediums. She initially worked semi-representationally, but turned to abstraction in 2010 with graphite, gouache and video depictions of undulating, biomorphic forms set against velvety expanses. Critics described these works as visceral, sometimes unsettling, Rorschach-like viewing experiences that suggested technology-aided explorations into the unseen depths of the body. In various series, she experimented with drawings that transitioned into three-dimensional space, by shooting them with bullets, puncturing them with a leather puncher or collaging shrapnel-like slivers onto them.

In the latter 2010s, she sought to create more immersive experiences in her "Surds," "Manifestos" and "Hollowpoint" series, which resembled twisting bodily forms or swirling storms, falling comets and teeming undergrowth. She turned to virtual reality (and later, augmented reality) in 2017, mark-making in the air with a handheld controller to create 3D digital iterations captured by laser of her "Hollowpoint" graphite drawings.

=== Extended reality (XR) projects ===
Baker Cahill's initial extended reality projects were created in virtual reality. These included her VR "Hollowpoint" drawings (LACE, 2018) and her Sunset Digital Billboards project (2018), which depicted abstract towers of translucent color and jagged edges of metallic shards floating through space. Seeking wider access to her work than VR could offer, she shifted to augmented reality after creating the free 4th Wall application.

In several large-scale, site-responsive AR projects, Baker Cahill addressed environmental devastation and accountability. Elvira Wilk of Frieze described these mutable and relocatable works as "a distinct counterpoint to (masculinist) land art traditions that exalt human intervention into the natural landscape." Her Desert X works, Revolutions and Margin of Error (2019), placed bursting, animated drawings—of fuchsia, gold and orange desert blooms and abstract, organic forms—above a Palm Springs wind farm and the Salton Sea, spatially and conceptually tying sites of renewable energy with the casualties of environmental disruption and degradation. Los Angeles Times critic Christopher Knight described the latter work as a haunting, "twirling, swirling fog of phantasmagorical shards of light and shadow hovering in the sky" that evoked a star being born from a cloud of dust, a plague of locusts, or a thought forming.

==== Mushroom Cloud ====
Baker Cahill exhibited Mushroom Cloud in site-responsive AR iterations at Art Basel Miami (2021), the Santa Monica Pier and the Tribeca Film Festival (both 2022). In its first two versions, a fiery, cataclysmic mushroom cloud swells and explodes over the ocean before transforming into a crackling web of lacy, lilac arterial threads—more hopeful, interconnected forms that suggested digital webs and mycelial (fungal) networks. Stone Speaks (2022–23) similarly evoked both ecological disaster and its healing, depicting a kind of Big Bang in reverse forming into a sphere and then a verdant Earth-like planet which undergoes deterioration and then regeneration.

==== Liberty Bell ====
Nancy Baker Cahill, Liberty Bell, augmented reality artwork, 2020, Washington, DC.

On July 4, 2020, Baker Cahill presented Liberty Bell, six public site-specific animated artworks commissioned by Art Production Fund that appeared in culturally significant sites across the Eastern United States: the Boston Tea Party harbor; the Washington Monument; the "Rocky Steps" in Philadelphia; the Fort Tilden Army installation; Fort Sumter; and the Edmund Pettus Bridge in Selma, Alabama. The animation depicted a floating, shape-shifting coil of red, white and blue brushstrokes roughly approximating a swaying, abstracted Liberty Bell—accompanied by a raucous soundtrack—which built toward arrhythmic dissolution but retained cohesion. Artillery wrote that the "writhing, seething mess of threads" and tolling bell "embodies the turbulent political discourse of an election year and the fraying state of American democracy." Smithsonian Magazine described the work as a timely reflection on liberty, freedom and injustice, "when communities are reckoning with the racist legacies of historical monuments across the country and, in many cases, taking them down."

==== State Property and Cento ====
Nancy Baker Cahill, Cento, augmented reality artwork, 2023, Whitney Museum.

In 2023, Baker Cahill projected State Property above the U.S. Supreme Court and selected statehouses, a visceral image of a neon-red, fracturing uterus designed to address and map out the sites of the most extreme legislation restricting abortion and reproductive rights throughout the nation.

Later in the year, she presented the AR work Cento at the Whitney Museum, a fictitious hybrid creature. Participants could use an app to collectively transform it by adding feathers that enabled new adaptive skills. The work positioned different species—human, cephalopod, microbiome, avian, mycelial, marine and machine—as one interconnected body, pointing to the necessity of collaboration and interdependence in the face of climate crisis. Surface magazine described it as seeming "to spring from the intersection of steampunk and ancient mythology."

== NFT and blockchain projects ==
Nancy Baker Cahill, Slipstream 100, graphite on paper and wood veneer, 108" x 168" x 24", 2021.

In 2021, Baker Cahill began working with non-fungible tokens (NFTs) and blockchain technology, as in the work Slipstream 001 (2021), for which she used torn graphite paper to create a sculpture that was transmuted into a 3D object and filmed so that it moved in a slow semi-circle before viewers. Charlotte Kent of The Brooklyn Rail described the multi-layered piece as a "simple yet disconcerting breakdown and reconfiguration of a 'real' sculpture."

Baker Cahill collaboratively developed Contract Killers—an NFT project critiquing smart contracts, accountability and the yet-unrealized promise of equity in the blockchain space—with art lawyer Sarah Conley Odenkirk, Contemporary Art Museum of Houston, and Snark.art. It consisted of four separate AR renderings of a handshake dissipating into a swirl of pixels in front of selected charged environments (e.g., Los Angeles City Hall, the Hall of Justice) in order to represent a state of failed social trust and obligation. New media art curator and historian Christiane Paul wrote, "By minting them as NFTs, [Baker Cahill] positions the smart contract among other kinds of contracts—social, judicial, financial—and highlights the instability of all of them."

== Curatorial and collaborative projects ==
Baker Cahill's collaborative projects have examined social issues, often using 4th Wall to virtually locate works at contested sites, enabling critical commentary while skirting issues of permission. In 2018, she initiated "Coordinates," a series of global AR public exhibitions strategically situated to address topical issues such as the Breonna Taylor tragedy. "Defining Line" was an extension of that project that activated untold sites of historical significance along the Los Angeles River involving urban redevelopment, the environment, Native histories and patterns of gentrification. In 2019, Baker Cahill co-curated "Battlegrounds" with Jesse Damiani, an exhibition of 31 AR works that sought to reclaim various locations in and around New Orleans, including a sugarcane plantation, gentrified neighborhoods, prisons, polluted waterways and confederate statues.

== Recognition ==
Baker Cahill's work belongs to the collections of the Whitney Museum, Los Angeles Museum of Contemporary Art (MOCA) and Lancaster Museum of Art and History, among others. In 2022, she received a LACMA Art + Technology Lab Grant and a COLA (City of Los Angeles) Master Artist Fellowship. She was an artist fellow at the Occidental College Oxy Arts' Encoding Futures program (2021), a Williams College Bicentennial Medal of Honor recipient (2021), and one of ten Berggruen Institute inaugural artist fellows in its Transformations of the Human program (2020). In 2012, she received an ARC Grant from the Center for Cultural Innovation. She was a featured TEDx speaker in 2018 and a keynote speaker at Games for Change in New York City in 2019. In 2024, the Whitney Museum selected Baker Cahill to give its annual Walter Annenberg Lecture. In 2026, she was named a United States Artists (USA) Fellow.
