= Zahrah Al Ghamdi =

Saudi contemporary artist

Zahrah Al Ghamdi (Arabic: زهرة الغامدي) is a Saudi Arabian visual and land artist, as well as an assistant professor at the College of Art and Design at the University of Jeddah.

== Career ==
Al Ghamdi grew up in Al-Baha in the south-west of the Kingdom and her experience of domestic architecture there informs her artistic practice. She graduated in 2003 with a first-class degree in Islamic Arts at the King Abdul Aziz University. She worked there as a lecturer before moving to the University of Coventry to study for an MA, then a PhD in Visual Art.

Al Ghamdi's artistic practice centres around large-scale pieces inspired and driven by women's experiences of life and craft in the home. In 2017, al Ghamdi created a site-specific land art installation in the Great Court at the British Museum, covering 30 square metres with a village of sand and memory. As part of the Shubbak Festival, al Ghamdi took part in discussion about women's art from Saudi Arabia.

In 2019, she was selected to represent Saudi Arabia at the 58th Venice Biennale. The Saudi pavilion was curated by Prof. Eiman Elgibreen. The installation was made up of 52,000 pieces of re-worked leather inspired by organic forms, her home in Al-Baha and Aseeri ornaments. The exhibition, After Illusion, took its title from a sixth-century poem by Zuhayr bin Abī Sūlmā. All their work bridges poetics and domestic landscapes.

Desert X Arts Biennial chose al Ghamdi as one its artists for installations in Al-'Ula in 2020. Her installation was made up of 6000 date tins, placed in the land to reflect the idea and movement of a river.

== Exhibitions ==
Al Ghamdi has exhibited widely in the middle-east and in Europe, at venues including:

- 2015 - An Inaminate Village - Alserkal Avenue
- 2017 - Shift - Women Artists from Saudi Arabia - Shubbak Festival, London
- 2017 - The Labyrinth & Time - Saudi Arts Council
- 2019 - After Illusion - 58th Venice Biennale
- 2019 - Mycelium Running - Jameel Arts Centre
- 2019 - Streams Move Oceans - Athr Gallery, Jeddah
- 2020 - Glimpses of the Past - Desert X, Al-'Ula
