= Julião Sarmento =

Portuguese painter (1948–2021)

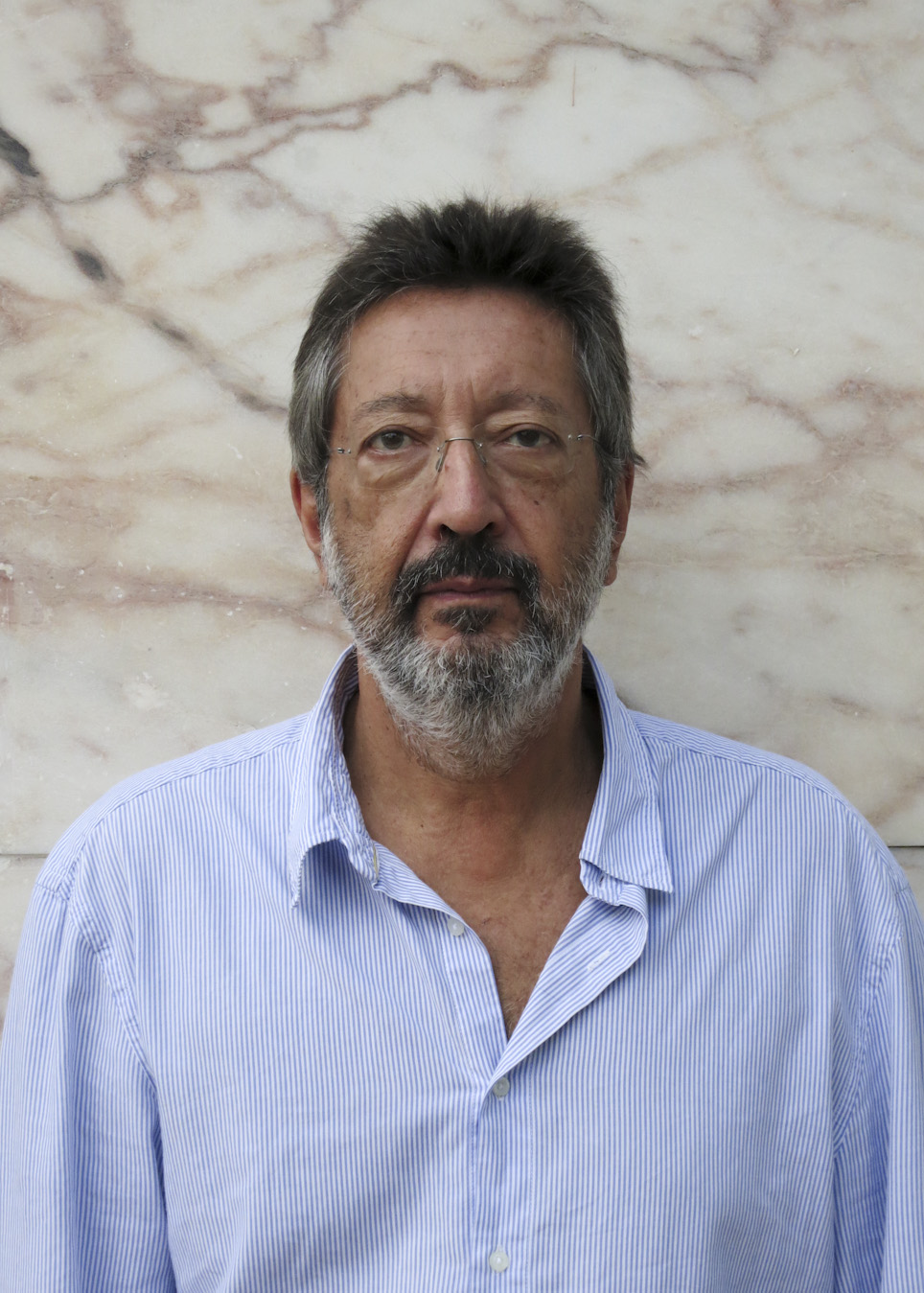
Portuguese multimedia artist and painter

Julião Manuel Tavares Sena Sarmento (4 November 1948 – 4 May 2021) was a Portuguese multimedia artist and painter.

== Biography / Work ==
Born in Lisbon in 1948, Sarmento studied painting and architecture at the Lisbon School of Fine Arts. He began exhibiting film, video, sound, painting, sculpture, installation, and multimedia in the early seventies, but also developed several site-specific projects.

He exhibited his work extensively around the world in solo and group shows. Sarmento represented Portugal at the Venice Biennial in 1997. His work is represented in several museums and private collections, including an artist's room exhibited at London's Tate Modern in 2010.

In his video installation Leporello (2010) he featured Jerusa Franco, Amira Casar, Sasha Grey, and Pamela Butt. A demonstration of his work was showcased as part of the Desert X exhibit in the Coachella Valley from 25 February – 30 April 2017.

Julião Sarmento was married to Isabel Sarmento and together they had a son, Duarte and a daughter, Laura. Sarmento lived and worked in Estoril, Portugal.

Julião Sarmento died of cancer on 4 May 2021 at his home in Estoril at the age of 72.
