= Cecilia Bengolea =

Argentine dancer and choreographer

Cecilia Bengolea (born 1979, Buenos Aires) is an Argentinian artist, choreographer and dancer. Her works have been shown or performed at the Desert X of the Coachella Festival, the Art Basel or the Guggenheim Museum in Bilbao amongst other venues.

== Early life and education ==
Bengolea was born in Buenos Aires, and began to take Jazz dance lessons at the age of twelve. Having graduated from high school, she enrolled into the University of Buenos Aires to study Art History and Philosophy. later also been influenced by the traditional dance culture in South-America in Peru and Bolivia. In 2001 she moved to Paris, and followed up on her studies at the Ex..e.r.c.e program in Montpellier, instructed Mathilde Monnier.

== Professional career ==
From 2005 onwards she developed a working relationship with François Chaignaud with who realized several major performances together until 2015. They have created the choreography for pieces at the Opera of Lyon and the Opera Lorraine in France and also the Pina Bausch Dancecompany in Wuppertal, Germany. She has collaborated with the video artists Jeremy Deller as well as Dominique Gonzalez-Forster.

=== Dancing style ===
She is particularly interested in anthropological research on contemporary and archaic forms of dance, and devotes herself to learning techniques, movements, and choreographies from around the world, using them to shape her own artistic vocabulary. Her dance style has been influenced by the traditional dance culture in South-America in Peru and Bolivia. Since 2015 several of her works are strongly influenced by the Dancehall from Jamaica.

== Awards ==
2009, together with François Chaignaud, Paris critique choreographic revelation Award

2014, Young Artist Prize Gwanju Biennale
