= Doug Aitken =

American artist (born 1968)

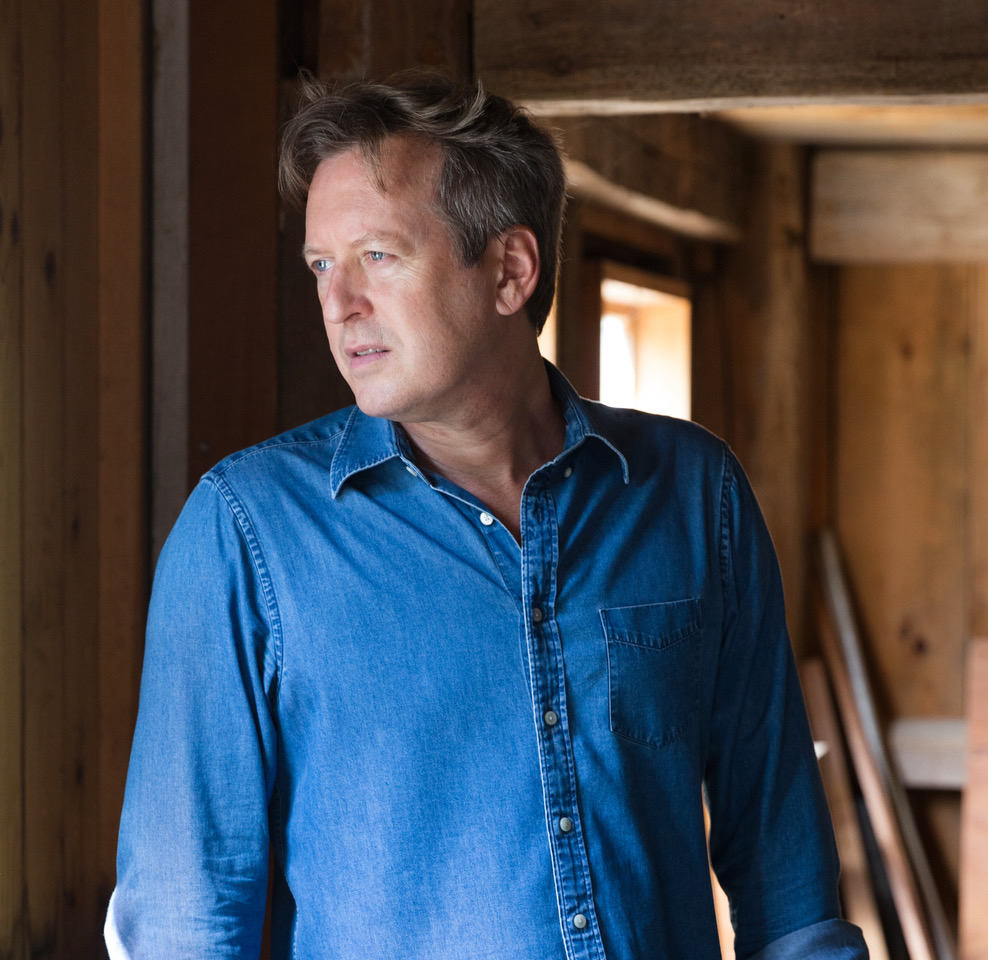
- Aitken in 2019
- Born: 1968 (age 57–58); Redondo Beach, California, US
- Occupation: Multidisciplinary artist
- Website: www.dougaitkenworkshop.com

Doug Aitken (born 1968) is an American multidisciplinary artist. Aitken's body of work ranges from photography, print media, sculpture, and architectural interventions, to narrative films, sound, single and multi-channel video works, installations, and live performance. He currently lives in Venice, California, and New York City.

== Early life and education ==
Doug Aitken was born in 1968 in Redondo Beach, California. In 1987, he initially studied magazine illustration with Philip Hays at the Art Center College of Design in Pasadena before graduating in fine arts in 1991.

== Work ==
He moved to New York in 1994 where he had his first solo show at 303 Gallery.

Aitken's body of work ranges from photography, print media, sculpture, and architectural interventions, to narrative films, sound, single and multi-channel video works, installations, and live performance. Aitken's video works have taken place in such culturally loaded sites as Jonestown in Guyana, southwest Africa's diamond mines, and India's Bollywood.

=== Site-specific projects ===
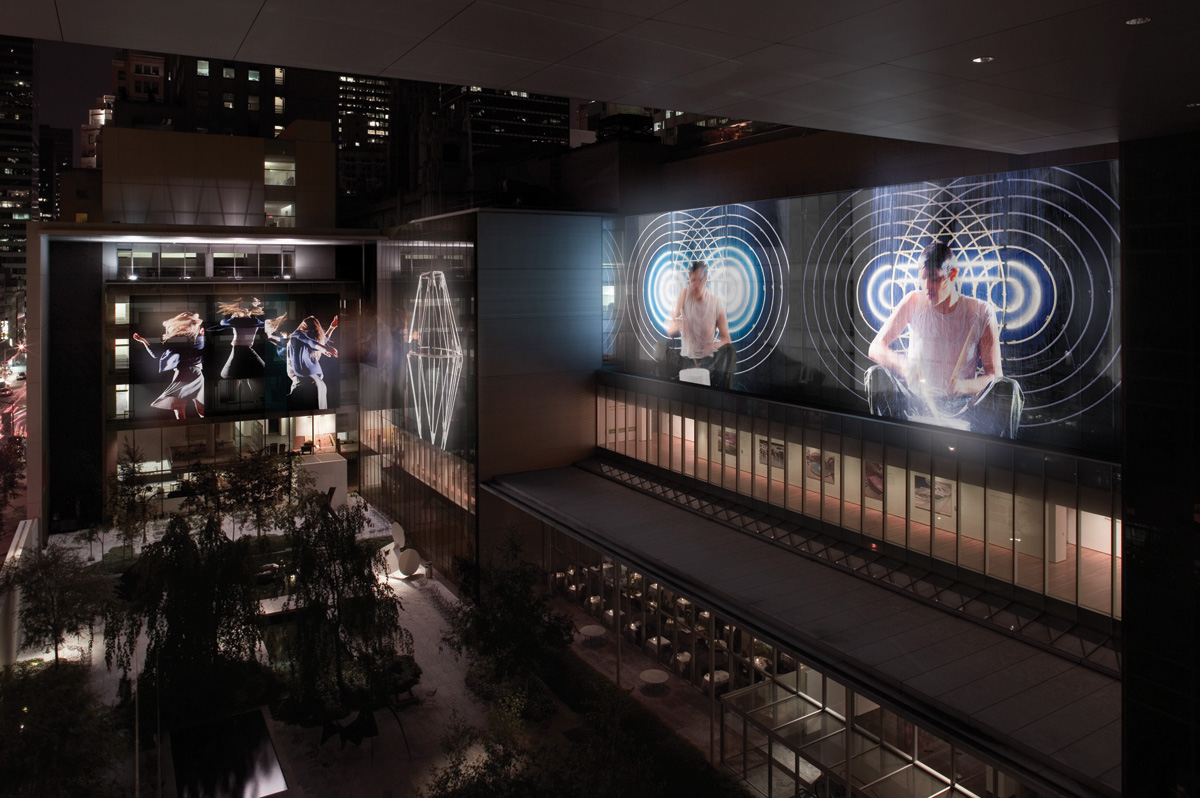
Aitken's ''Sleepwalkers'' displayed at the Museum of Modern Art 2007

Aitken has created an array of site-specific installations, sometimes synthesizing interactive media with architecture. A recent site-specific work, New Horizon, revolved around a reflective hot air balloon and gondola that transformed into a kinetic light sculpture. The balloon sculpture was featured in a series of happenings that took place in July 2019 across the state of Massachusetts. Another project was Underwater Pavilions (2016), which consisted of three temporary sculptures that were moored to the ocean floor off Catalina Island, CA. Geometric in design, the sculptures created environments that reflected and refracted light, opening a portal that physically connected a viewer to the expanse of the ocean while simultaneously disrupting preconceived visual ideas of the aquatic world. By merging the language of contemporary architecture, land art, and ocean research and conservation, the Underwater Pavilions were a living artwork within a vibrant ecosystem. In contrast to areas of the sculpture that have a rough and rock-like surface, mirrored sections reflected the seascape and, when approached, activated to become a kaleidoscopic observatory. The environments created by the sculptures changed and adjusted with the currents and time of day, focusing the attention of the viewer on the rhythm of the ocean and its life cycles. The artwork created a variety of converging perceptual encounters that played with the fluidity of time and space, resulting in a heightened awareness of the physical world. The sculptures were created in partnership with Parley for the Oceans and the Museum of Contemporary Art, Los Angeles. Another site-specific project, titled Mirage, premiered at Desert X, near Palm Springs, CA from February 25 to April 30, 2017, and evolved with presentations in Detroit, MI, as Mirage Detroit (2018), and Switzerland as Mirage Gstaad (2019).

=== Video installations ===
Since the mid-1990s, Aitken has created installations by employing multiple screens in architecturally provocative environments. diamond sea (1997), for example, includes three video projections, one suspended video monitor, and one full-color, illuminated transparency photograph in a dimly lit space. Multiple speakers create an immersive sound experience; the multi-screen film explores a guarded region in the Namib desert in southwestern Africa known as Diamond Area 1 and 2. The territory, estimated at over 40,000 square miles and sealed off since 1908, contains the world's largest and richest computer-controlled diamond mine. Hysteria (1998–2000) uses film footage from the past four decades that shows audiences at pop and rock concerts working themselves into a frenzy on four screens in an X formation. Filmed and photographed in the dusty sound stages and film sets of Bombay, Into the Sun (1999) focuses on the frenetic activity of Bollywood, recreating the sound stages of the Indian film industry with canvas projection screens, a red dirt floor, and video shown in a non-stop, twenty-four-hour loop. diamond sea was presented at the 1997 Whitney Biennial and his electric earth installation, an eight projection, multi-room post cinematic experience, drew international attention and earned him the International Prize at the Venice Biennale in 1999. His ambitious show New Ocean, which included multiple sound, photo, and video works, began with a transformation of the Serpentine Gallery in London and traveled the world to Austria, Italy and Japan, each time in a new configuration. In 2010, Aitken exhibited his work House, a study of destruction featuring the artist's parents. In 2017, the artist displayed a three channel video installation titled Underwater Pavilions at Art Basel Unlimited, documenting sculptures of the same name. Aitken has shown NEW ERA, a kaleidoscopic multi-channel video installation in a mirrored hexagonal room, in various locations across the world, from New York to Zurich, Denmark, Beijing, California and London. The artwork maps the creation of the cellular telephone into a landscape of repetition and philosophical reckoning with its effect on the world. In 2023 in Zürich, he showed a five-channel video installation titled HOWL where "oil derricks spot the rolling, sun-bleached hills of a desolate valley in central California while plywood boards shutter local stores. Interspersed within these depictions of wide-open spaces, residents provide soundbites on the circumstances of living in this dying town. They tell of their hopes for the area, its oil-boom history, their lives and the wider future."

=== Outdoor film installations ===
In 2000, the exhibition glass horizon included untitled "secession eyes", an installation comprising a projection of a pair of eyes onto the facade of the Vienna Secession building after it had closed for the night, showcased an interest in architectural structures and in art that interacts with urban environments. In 2001, Aitken's exhibition at London's Serpentine Gallery used the entire building for the complex installation New Ocean including transforming the museum's tower into a functional lighthouse at night.

In 2004, after having worked together in Berlin, Doug Aitken and Klaus Biesenbach co-curated Hard Light, a group exhibition at MoMA PS1. In the winter of 2007, Aitken's large-scale installation Sleepwalkers, curated by Klaus Biesenbach in collaboration with Creative Time, was presented at the Museum of Modern Art in New York. The project included actors such as Donald Sutherland and Tilda Swinton, as well as musicians Seu Jorge and Cat Power. Five interlocking vignettes shown through eight projections were displayed upon the exterior walls of the museum so as to be visible from the street. Concurrent with the exhibition, Aitken also presented a "happening" inside the museum that featured live drummers and auctioneers, and a performance by Cat Power. In the same year, he created an interactive music table: "k-n-o-c-k-o-u-t".

In 2008, Aitken produced another large scale outdoor film installation, titled Migration for the 55th Carnegie International show titled "Life on Mars" in Pittsburgh, PA. The first installment in a three-part trilogy entitled Empire, the work features migratory wild animals of North America as they pass through and curiously inhabit empty and desolate hotel rooms.

Continuing Aitken's work in large scale outdoor video installation, his artwork "SONG 1" (2012), created for the Hirshhorn Museum and Sculpture Garden, challenged the standard of public art in Washington D.C. The artwork, which deconstructed the popular song "I Only Have Eyes for You", created a 360 degree screen out of the circular facade of the museum. Rather than using a more typical concave surface for such a projection, Aitken projected the film onto the convex exterior of the museum creating a cinema experience that required moving around the building and could never be fully seen from any one location.

Another example of what the artist has called 'liquid architecture', his freestanding installation ALTERED EARTH (2012) explores the Camargue region of southern France in a maze-like flowing arrangement of twelve large projections in the hangar-like Grande Halle of the Parc des Ateliers in Arles. The work also inspired an app created by the artist and POST for the Apple iPad.

Commissioned by art patron Bagley Wright, Mirror (2013) is a large LED screen, wrapped around the corner of the Seattle Art Museum, with thin strips of vertical lights. For the project, Aitken had been filming for the project over five years, capturing images of central Seattle as well as the surrounding area. A computer program selects which parts of the footage to project in response to a live feed of information that ranges from the weather to the density of traffic in the streets of Seattle.

=== Conversations ===
In 2006, Aitken produced Broken Screen: 26 Conversations with Doug Aitken (Distributed Art Publishers, 2006), a book of interviews with twenty-six artists who aim to explore and challenge the conventions of linear narrative. Interviews included Robert Altman, Claire Denis, Werner Herzog, Rem Koolhaas, Kenneth Anger and others. The Idea of the West (2010) presents the collective response of 1000 people on the street who were asked “What is your idea of the West?” to create a manifesto from the quotes and comments of random individuals. Another interview project, Patterns & Repetition (2011) is a series of filmed conversations about creativity in the 21st Century in which Aitken conducts short conversations with pioneers in different artistic disciplines, including Devendra Banhart, Thomas Demand, Jack White, James Murphy, Mike Kelley, Jacques Herzog, Fischli & Weiss, Yayoi Kusama, Stephen Shore, and Dan Graham. Continuing his interest in the exchange of ideas, Aitken's work "THE SOURCE" (2012) explores the root of creativity. Six projections in a pavilion designed by David Adjaye, cycle through many more interviews with artists, architects, and musicians such as Adjaye, Liz Diller, William Eggleston, Philippe Parreno, Paolo Soleri, Tilda Swinton, and Beck among others.

=== Happenings ===
Aitken has directed many live "happenings" including his Broken Screen happenings from 2006 in Los Angeles and New York. In 2009, Aitken orchestrated a real-time opera titled "the handle comes up, the hammer comes down" that assembled auctioneers performing against the rhythms of his Sonic Table, at Il Tempo del Postino, at Theater Basel.

Also in 2009, along with his large-scale video installation, Frontier, presented on the Tiber river's Isola Tiberina in the heart of Rome, Aitken staged a happening by the same title. The film featured a protagonist played by the iconic American artist Ed Ruscha, as he's seen caught in a landscape between fiction and non-fiction. The work creates a futuristic journey from day to night in a world where reality is put into question. In the happening, performers from the film, such as a professional whip cracker, come alive in the installation while surrounded by the audience. First shown at the Deste Foundation’s project space "Slaughterhouse" on the Greek island of Hydra, Black Mirror is displayed on five screens reflected “into infinity” across black mirrors and stars Chloë Sevigny tethered only by brief conversations over the phone and through voiceover in such disparate locales as Mexico, Greece, and Central America. "Black Mirror" was also a four-night event staged on a custom barge, again featuring a performers from the film: Leo Gallo, Tim McAfee-Lewis, No Age, and Chloë Sevigny.

=== Photographs, light boxes, and sculptures ===
Aitken is well known for his many photographs, which often explore spatial and temporal disruption and narrative suggestion like his installations. For example, Passenger, a group of still photographs made in 1999, shows planes in flight, most of which focus on the faint traceries of takeoffs and landings over desolate airport landscapes. More recently, Aitken has created aluminum light boxes that combine photographic image and text. Extending the theme of text and image, Aitken has produced sculptures from materials as diverse as plants inside clear acrylic and kaleidoscopic mirrors. Other sculptures, such as sunset (black and white), 2012, employ the use of hand-carved foam, epoxy and hand silk-screened acrylic.

=== Sound experiments ===
Interested in the uneasy intersection of nature and culture or narrative variability, the artist has incorporated into his scores what he calls "field recordings," such as jungle noises from Jonestown, Guyana (in his 1995 monsoon), and the reverberations of tremors generated by the eruption of the Soufrière Hills volcano on the Caribbean island of Montserrat (in eraser, 1998). In 1996, for the public art organization Creative Time, Aitken conceived an installation piece in the Anchorage, a cavernous space inside the base of the Brooklyn Bridge, that used recordings of the traffic noises overhead. In 2004, he completed a sound sculpture for the Barcelona Pavilion composed of a central post supporting a few sweeping steel branches that rotated while highly directional speakers at the end of each branch played snippets of scripted conversation. In October 2009, Aitken's Sonic Pavilion opened to the public. The pavilion is located in the forested hills of Brazil, at Inhotim. The Sonic Pavilion provides a communal space to listen to the sounds of the earth as they are recorded through highly sensitive microphones buried close to a mile deep into the ground and carried back into the pavilion through a number of speakers. The sound heard inside the pavilion is the amplified sound of the moving interior of the earth. Aitken has collaborated on his films with a wide variety of musicians, from hip hop artist André 3000 of Outkast, who was in Aitken's 2002 multiscreen Interiors to indie bands like Lichens and No Age, which contributed to his score for his 2008 film Migration and 2011's Black Mirror, respectively.

=== Books ===
Aitken is also a producer of books: I AM A BULLET: Scenes from an Accelerating Culture (2000) a collaboration with writer Dean Kuipers; Doug Aitken: A-Z Book (Fractals) (2003), the alphabet serves as structure to arrange Aitken's photography and video work, along with texts and interviews; Broken Screen (2005), a book of interviews with 26 artists pushing the limits of linear narrative; Alpha, published in 2005 by the Musée d'Art Moderne de la Ville de Paris; Sleepwalkers (2007), published by the Museum of Modern Art, in correspondence to the film and video installation of the same name; 99 Cent Dreams (2008), a collection of photographs that captures "moments between interaction" to create a 21st-century nomadic travelogue; Write In Jerry Brown President (2008), a folded artist book published by the Museum of Modern Art,; The Idea of the West (2010), which asked 1,000 people about their idea of the west, and was produced in conjunction with a happening at the Museum of Contemporary Art, Los Angeles,; Black Mirror (2011), features a nomadic Chloë Sevigny, produced in conjunction with a video installation and live theater performance staged on a barge; SONG 1 (2012), accompanied an exhibition of the same name at the Hirshhorn Museum and Sculpture Garden, the book takes the form of the Hirshhorn itself, while examining the artwork that explores the idea of pure communication through the pop song I Only Have Eyes for You.

Two monograph style books contain comprehensive information on the artist's career: Doug Aitken: 100 YRS, published by Rizzoli and Doug Aitken: Electric Earth, published by Prestel.

=== Station to Station ===
Station to Station was a nomadic “Happening” that first occurred in the fall of 2013 on a transcontinental train. It functioned as a moving platform for artistic experimentation stopping in cities, towns and remote locations across America. An artist-created project, Station to Station embraced constantly changing stories, unexpected encounters, and creative collisions between music, art and film.

The project had the support of a wide range of institutions including MoMA PS1, Carnegie Museum of Art, MCA Chicago, Walker Art Center, SITE Santa Fe, LACMA and SFMOMA. All event proceeds went to fund multi-museum arts programs throughout 2014.

Art works and musical performances changed with every stop. The train traveled from New York City to San Francisco, making a total of 9 stops at train stations across the country - New York; Pittsburgh; Chicago; Minneapolis/St. Paul; Santa Fe/Lamy, New Mexico; Winslow, Arizona; Barstow, California; Los Angeles; and Oakland. The project acted as a studio and cultural incubator, creating unplanned moments and artistic collisions. Artists that participated included Kenneth Anger, Olaf Breuning, Peter Coffin, Thomas Demand, Urs Fischer, Meschac Gaba, Liz Glynn, Fischli & Weiss, Fritz Haeg, Carsten Höller, Olafur Eliasson, Christian Jankowski, Aaron Koblin, Ernesto Neto, Nam June Paik, Jorge Pardo, Jack Pierson, Nicolas Provost, Stephen Shore, Rirkrit Tiravanija, and Lawrence Weiner. Musicians included Beck, The Black Monks of Mississippi, Boredoms, Jackson Browne, Cat Power, Cold Cave, The Congos, Dan Deacon, Eleanor Friedberger, The Handsome Family, Lia Ices, Kansas City Marching Cobras, Lucky Dragons, Thurston Moore, Giorgio Moroder, Nite Jewel, No Age, Patti Smith, Ariel Pink’s Haunted Graffiti, Savages (band), Mavis Staples, Suicide (band), Sun Araw, Thee Satisfaction, Twin Shadow and others. Printed matter contributors included Taylor-Ruth Baldwin, Yto Barrada, Sam Durant, Karen Kilimnik, Urs Fischer, Catherine Opie, Jack Pierson, Raymond Pettibon, and Josh Smith. Food was provided by Alice Waters and the Edible Schoolyard Project and chef Leif Hedendal.

From June 27- July 26, 2015, Aitken staged Station to Station: A 30 Day Happening at the Barbican Centre in London. Envisioned as a living exhibition, the entire multi-arts facility was turned into a large scale multi-disciplinary event, with more than 100 artists, including Olafur Eliasson, Martin Creed, and Terry Riley.

On August 21, 2015, a feature film directed by Aitken, shot with footage from the 2013 happenings, titled Station to Station, premiered in Los Angeles. Experimental in format, the film was described as "...a textured, visceral collection of 62 shorts capturing moments during the three-week journey..."

== Exhibitions ==
Aitken has participated in over 200 art exhibitions throughout the world. His work has been featured in numerous group exhibitions in such institutions as the Whitney Museum of American Art, The Museum of Modern Art, and the Centre Georges Pompidou in Paris. Among others, he has had solo exhibitions at the Schirn Kunsthalle, Frankfurt, Hirshhorn Museum and Sculpture Garden, Musée d'Art Moderne de la Ville de Paris, the Serpentine Gallery, London, Kunsthalle Zürich, Switzerland, Kunsthaus Bregenz, Austria, Museum of Modern Art, New York, Deste Foundation, Greece and Tokyo Opera City Art Gallery, Japan. In 2006, the Aspen Art Museum mounted the first exhibition dedicated solely to Aitken's photography.

From September 10, 2016 - January 15, 2017, The Museum of Contemporary Art, Los Angeles, at the Geffen Contemporary at MOCA, exhibited Doug Aitken: Electric Earth, the artist's first North American mid-career survey. The exhibition traveled to The Modern Art Museum of Fort Worth, TX from May 28, 2017 - Aug 20, 2017.

Aitken is represented by 303 Gallery, New York; Regen Projects, Los Angeles; Galerie Eva Presenhuber, Zürich; and Victoria Miro Gallery, London.

== Other activities ==
- Americans for the Arts, Member of the Artists Committee

== Prizes ==
- 1999 International Prize – Golden Lion, Venice Biennale, Venice, Italy
- 2000 Aldrich Award, Aldrich Museum of Contemporary Art, Ridgefield, Connecticut, U.S.
- 2007 German Film Critic's Award, KunstFilmBiennale, Cologne, Germany
- 2009 Aurora Award, Aurora Picture Show, Houston, Texas, U.S.
- 2012 Nam June Paik Art Center Prize
- 2013 Smithsonian magazine's American Ingenuity Award in the Visual Arts category
- 2016 Americans for the Arts National Arts Award: Outstanding Contributions to the Arts
- 2017 Frontier Art Prize by the World Frontiers Forum, inaugural recipient
- 2019 ArtCenter College of Design, Lifetime Achievement Award

== See also ==
- List of video artists
