= Phillip K. Smith III =

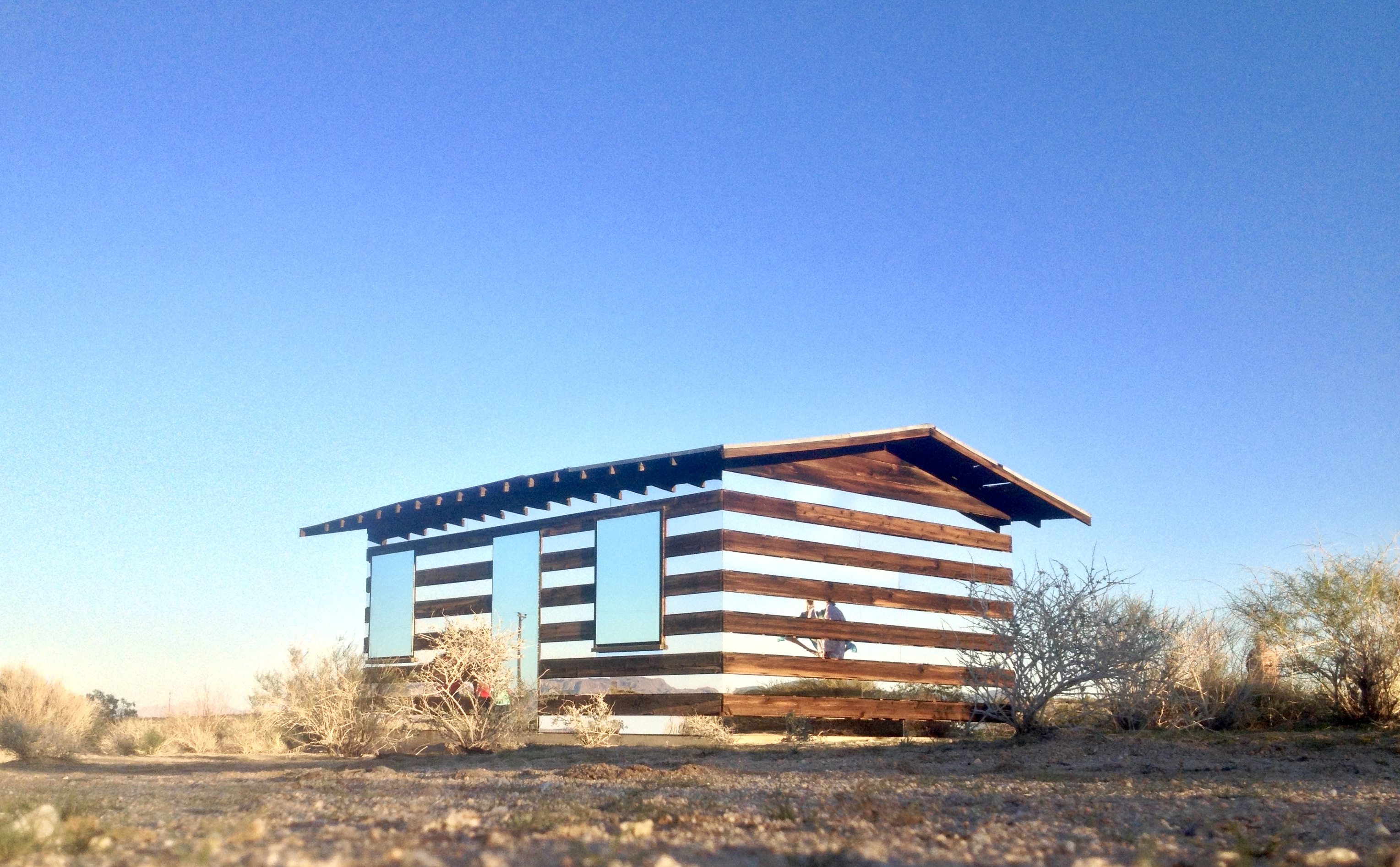
- Smith's Lucid Stead in Joshua Tree, California 2013
- Born: December 18, 1972 (age 53)
- Education: Rhode Island School of Design
- Movement: Light and Space
- Website: https://www.pks3.com https://www.instagram.com/phillipksmith3

Phillip K. Smith III (born December 18, 1972) is an American artist based out of Southern California. He primarily creates light-based work that draws upon ideas of light and space, form, color, light and shadow, environment, and change. Phillip K. Smith III received his Bachelor of Fine Arts and Bachelor of Architecture at the Rhode Island School of Design. Phillip K Smith III has worked on and created numerous large-scale sculptures across the country, as well as internationally. He has participated in numerous museum installations and shows around the world. His artwork is held in many important private collections as well as multiple museum's permanent collections. Phillip K. Smith III has often been compared to his predecessors such as Robert Irwin, James Turrell, Dan Flavin, Donald Judd, Craig Kauffman, Constantin Brancusi, Sol Lewitt, and Kenneth Noland.

== Background ==
Phillip K. Smith III was born in Los Angeles in 1972. He grew up in the Coachella Valley in Southern California, after his family moved there from LA when he was in first grade. Phillip K. Smith III received his Bachelor of Fine Arts and Bachelor of Architecture at the Rhode Island School of Design. After living in Providence, Rhode Island, Boston, Massachusetts and New York City, New York, he returned to the Palm Springs, California area in late 2000. In 2004, he bought 5 acres of desert land that would later house Lucid Stead. Smith was an artist in residence at Palm Springs Art Museum in 2010. He currently works from his Palm Desert, California studio

== List of notable installations ==
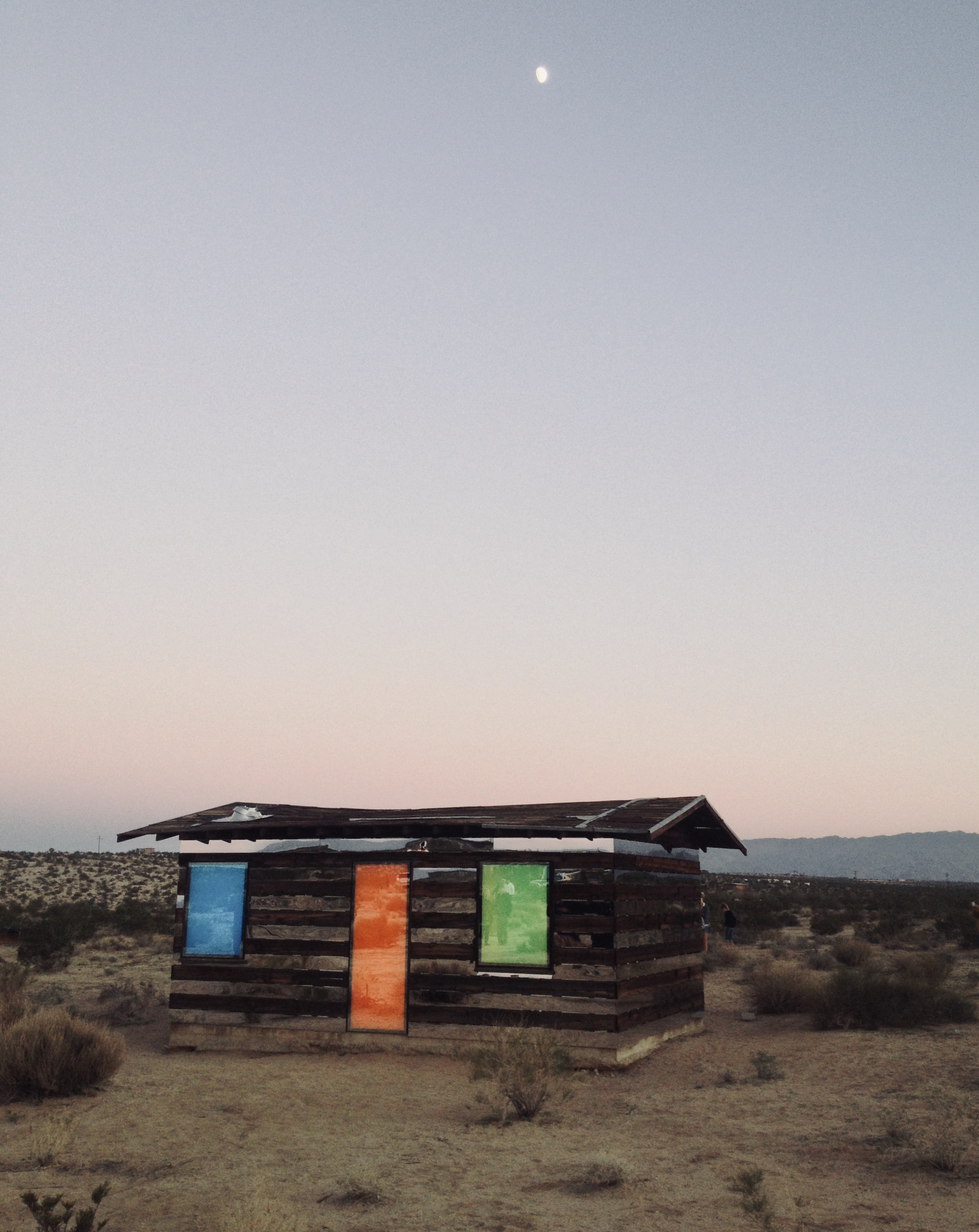
Lucid Stead at dusk

=== Lucid Stead ===
Joshua Tree, California. 2013

Lucid Stead was a temporary art installation created in 2013 in Joshua Tree, California. Set in the Californian High Desert, for the installation Phillip K. Smith III used a 70+ year old homestead shack

"Lucid Stead is about tapping into the quiet and the pace of change of the desert," said Smith at the time. "When you slow down and align yourself with the desert, the project begins to unfold before you. It reveals that it is about light and shadow, reflected light, projected light, and change."

=== Reflection Field ===
Indio, California. 2014

Reflection Field was an art installation created in 2014 for the Coachella Valley Music and Arts Festival. Phillip K. Smith III created an installation of mirrored forms that by day provided a series of reflections, but as day transitioned to night, the mirrored forms transformed into colorful forms of light.

=== Portals ===
Indio, California. 2016

Portals created in 2016 commission by Goldenvoice for the Coachella Valley Music and Arts Festival. an 85-foot diameter, circular, open-air pavilion. At the center of the pavilion, a mesquite tree. Surrounding the mesquite tree eight "portals," which feature pulsing, LED-powered concentric circles.

=== 1/4 Mile Arc ===
Laguna Beach, California. 2016

Created in 2016 for part of the Laguna Art Museum's Art and Nature programme. A 1/4 mile arc of mirror polished stainless posts gently curving along main beach in the Southern California beach town of Laguna Beach.

=== The Circle Of Land And Sky ===
Palm Desert, California. 2017

Part of the inaugural 2017 Desert X site-specific, contemporary art exhibition. The Circle Of Land And Sky, was located in Palm Desert, California. The installation, a reflective and dynamic sculpture formed by 300 reflectors, made of polished stainless steel, all angled at 10 degrees to form a circle that reflected the desert landscape and sky.

=== 120 Degree Arc East-Southeast ===
Miami Beach, Florida. 2017

Sculpture created in 2017 in Miami Beach, Florida in association with Faena Art.

=== Open Sky ===
Milan, Italy. 2018

Open Sky presented during Salone del Mobile 2018 in association with COS. The atmospheric, large-scale sculptural installation was installed in Milan’s Palazzo Isimbardi, inviting visitors to experience an artwork that transforms the historic courtyard into physical ring of reflected sky through carefully-angled mirrored planes.

=== Detroit Skybridge ===
Detroit, Michigan. 2018

Detroit Skybridge, unveiled in 2018, reactivates a disused pedestrian walkway that links two towers in the Detroit, Michigan downtown area. Phillip K Smith III transformed the 100-foot-long bridge adding LED lights behind the translucent panels, so they shine through as blocks of color.

== Quotes ==
“We desire the powerful, memorable experiences that we can’t fully explain. We desire mystery and beauty as they remind us of the unity, love, immensity, and incomprehensible complexity that exist in the world.” – Phillip K. Smith III

== See also ==
- Where the Earth Meets the Sky, Oklahoma City

== Bibliography ==
Smith III, Phillip K: (2017) Five Installations Laguna Art Museum and Grand Central Press ISBN 0940872420
