= EXPO Chicago =

Annual international art exhibition

The International Exposition of Contemporary & Modern Art EXPO CHICAGO
- Status: Active
- Genre: Art exhibition
- Dates: every April (four days)
- Frequency: annually
- Venue: Navy Pier
- Location: Chicago
- Years active: 46
- Founded: 1980 (as Art Chicago)
- Most recent: 2023
- Participants: contemporary and modern fine art galleries; artists; art collectors
- Attendance: 40,000
- Website: expochicago.com

EXPO CHICAGO is an international contemporary and modern art exhibition held each year in Chicago, Illinois.

In July 2023, it was announced EXPO CHICAGO had been acquired by Frieze Art Fair.

EXPO CHICAGO will be held April 24–27, 2025 at Navy Pier, Chicago.

== History ==
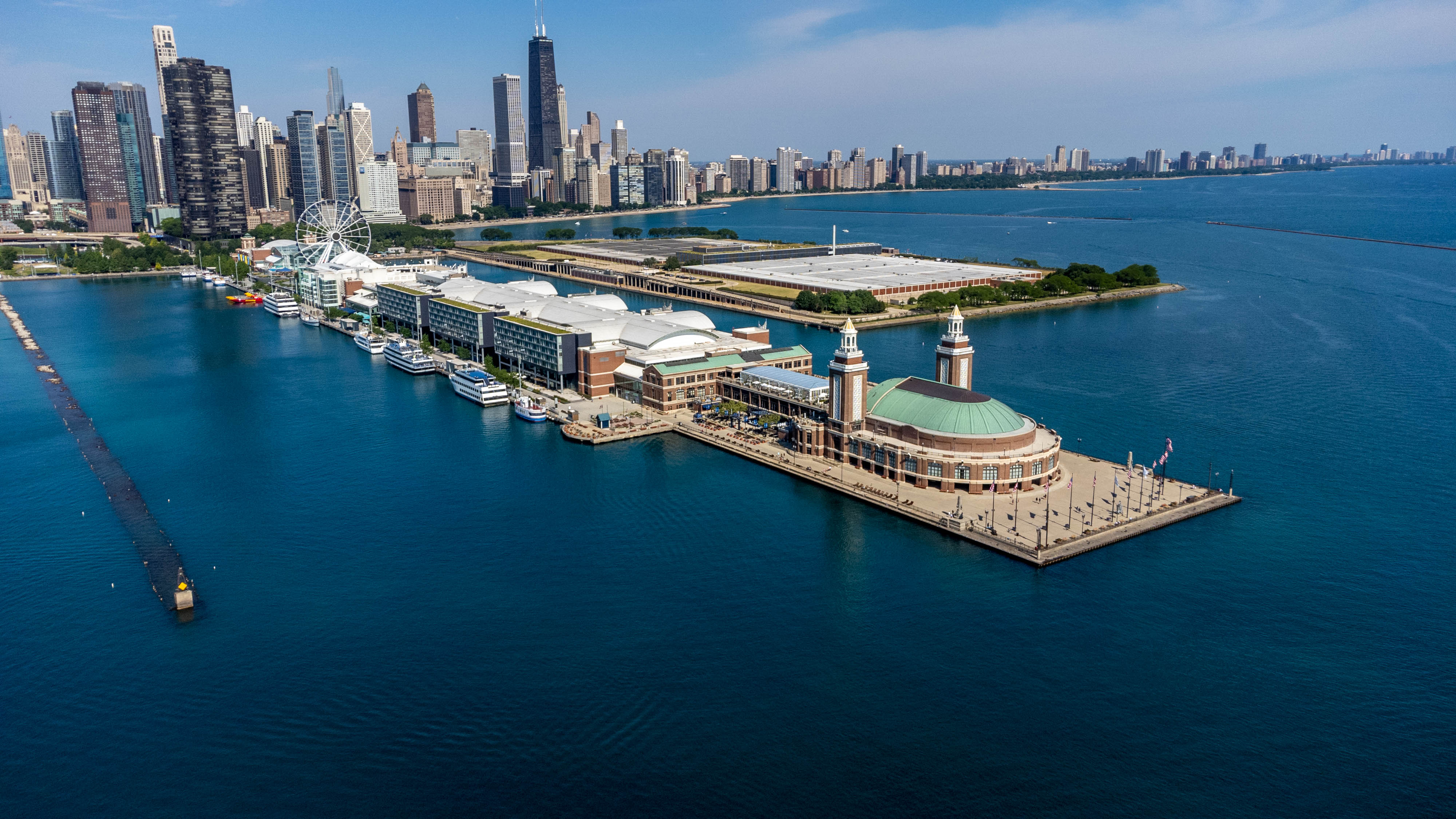
EXPO Chicago is held at Navy Pier

Art Chicago was founded as an American version of the Art Basel contemporary art exposition in 1980. Founded by Michigan print dealer John Wilson, Chicago International Art Exposition premiered in May at Navy Pier. The show attracted 80 dealers and 10,000 visitors. It was the first such modern fair in North America. For years it was held in the long barnlike sheds on Chicago's Navy Pier. In 1989, the leaky old sparrow-infested sheds on the pier were demolished and replaced by a mall, theatres, entertainment venues and convention exhibition halls. In 1993, Thomas Blackman took over as organizer of Art Chicago. During the 1990s, Art Chicago was called "the nation's leading fair of 20th-century art," "second only to Art Basel in Switzerland in global importance."

As the 1990s progressed, Art Chicago had troubles. The new Navy Pier buildings were cleaner and more inviting than the old ones, but the carnival atmosphere on the pier attracted an audience unused to art fairs. Robert Landau of Landau Fine Art in Montreal said of his experience in 2002, "we had more customers walking in off Navy Pier who really weren't there to see the art show. We had so many people coming in making remarks like, 'Are any of these paintings real?'" Sales decreased and major galleries pulled out. The newer "Art Basel Miami" fair surpassed Art Chicago in excitement, and drew away more galleries and important collectors.

In 2000 there were over 200 exhibitors; in 2004, the last year the fair was held on Navy Pier, there were more than 150 galleries exhibiting. In 2005 Art Chicago, redubbed "Art Chicago in the Park" was held in a giant tent in Grant Park behind the Art Institute of Chicago. There were now only 94 exhibitors, several of whom were new young Chicago galleries.

In 2006 catastrophe struck. The fair was again planned to be in a tent in Grant Park. Construction had been visibly slow, but it was not until the evening of Tuesday, April 25—two days before the fair was scheduled to open—that the news came out that Art Chicago was in trouble. There was a dispute between Blackman and the contractors, with Blackman claiming that the flooring was unacceptable and the contractors claiming bounced checks. Blackman appears to have tried to arrange quick financing, including offering to sell his business the Friday before. Embarrassingly, several international art dealers were turned away from the tent, where they had arrived to set up their exhibits. Mayor Daley, through a spokeswoman, expressed annoyance and disappointment. An attempt to quickly reorganize the fair on Navy Pier fell through.

On April 27, it was announced that Art Chicago would take place on the eighth floor of the Merchandise Mart, sharing it with the "Chicago Antiques Fair" which was already scheduled. Although makeshift, the fair was professionally handled, and although many exhibitors expressed concern, only three out of 104 dealers dropped out. At the same time, it was announced that Merchandise Mart Properties Inc. would buy the fair from Thomas Blackman Associates. A number of exhibitors said they were impressed at how well the fair turned out, and many preferred the new location.

In 2007 Art Chicago's new owners brought back some of the strength of the older fair. With 132 exhibitors, it was part of a five-day art exposition, "Artropolis", which also included Bridge Art Fair Chicago 07, The Intuit Show of Folk and Outsider Art, and The Artist Project Independent Artist Exhibition + Sale . Art Chicago 2008 built on the success of Art Chicago 2007, with more international galleries and more favorable attention and support, as well as the addition of the NEXT Art Fair, an invitational exhibition of emerging art. After the 2011 fair, owner Merchandise Mart Properties because it no longer wished to support the fair announced Art Chicago's cancellation. In 2012, it subsumed the role of Art Chicago, which was Chicago's longest-running major contemporary art exposition, running from 1980 until its cancelation after the 2011 fair due to financial problems.

Subsequently, the group under the name EXPO CHICAGO, decided to revitalize the annual International Exposition of Contemporary & Modern Art at Navy Pier.

In November 2025, Kate Sierzputowski became director of EXPO Chicago, succeeding founder Tony Karman. In this role she oversees gallery relations, collector engagement and curatorial initiatives for the fair.

== Reestablishment ==
In 2012, the inaugural EXPO CHICAGO art fair took place at Navy Pier Festival Hall with the hopes that it will "re-establish Chicago as a pre-eminent art fair destination." The fair premiered with installations by the celebrated architecture firm Studio Gang. Expo Chicago is managed by director Tony Karman.

The 2020 EXPO was cancelled due to the COVID-19 pandemic. The event was resumed in April 2021.

EXPO CHICAGO was held April 13–16, 2023 at Navy Pier.

== See also ==
- Chicago Architecture Biennial
- Visual arts of Chicago
- Art Basel
