= Chicago Architecture Biennial =

International architectural exhibition

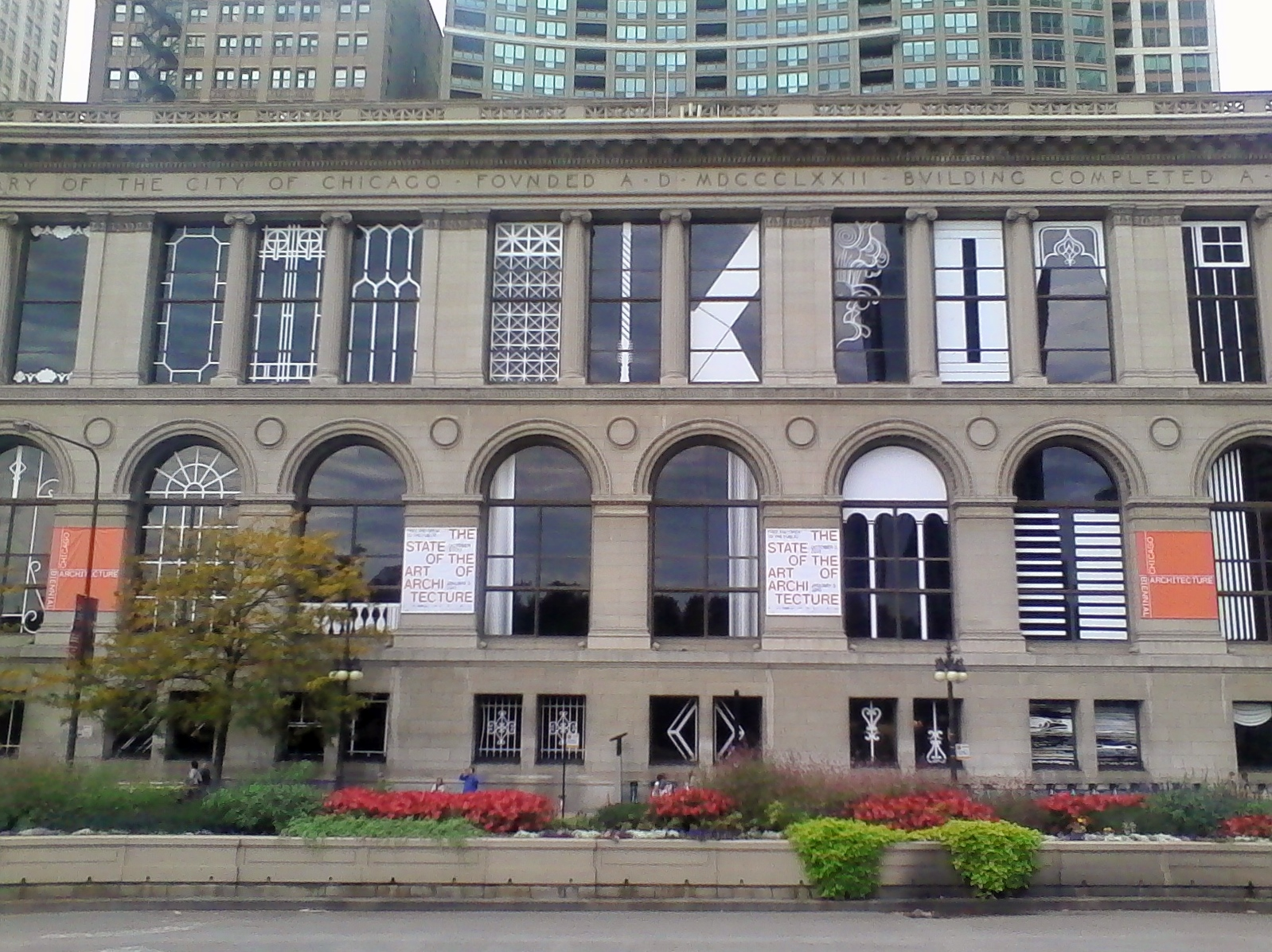
- Chicago Cultural Center during the first Chicago Architecture Biennial
- Status: Active
- Genre: Architecture exhibition
- Dates: September–January
- Frequency: Biennially
- Venue: Chicago Cultural Center
- Location: Chicago
- Years active: 12
- Founded: 2014
- Next event: 2025
- Participants: International, invited architects
- Attendance: 500,000 – 550,000
- Patrons: American Institute of Architects; Chicago Architecture Foundation; various public and private corporations and foundations
- Organiser: Chicago Architecture Biennial, Inc.
- Sponsor: City of Chicago; The Graham Foundation for Advanced Studies in the Fine Arts
- Website: chicagoarchitecturebiennial.org

The Chicago Architecture Biennial is an international exhibition of architectural ideas, projects and displays. It seeks "to provide a platform for groundbreaking architectural projects and spatial experiments that demonstrate how creativity and innovation can radically transform our lived experience." Founded in 2014, the biennial is managed by a charitable corporation under the auspices of the city's Cultural Affairs department, and sponsored by public and private organizations and individuals.

== Expositions ==
The first of its kind in North America, the inaugural iteration of the biennale took place in Chicago between October, 2015 and January, 2016, and was headquartered at the Chicago Cultural Center. Its first directors were Sarah Herda and Joseph Grima.

The event was championed by then-mayor Rahm Emanuel who told the Financial Times: "This biennial is an ode to the city's past and an echo to our future." The 2015-16 biennial had entries from 104 architects or practices. The exhibitors were invitees, many from North America and Europe, but also from Australia, Brazil, Chile, China, Colombia, Ecuador, India, Israel, Japan, Pakistan, the Palestinian Territories, South Africa, and South Korea. The theme of this biennial was The State of the Art of Architecture. The title of the first biennial originates from a 1977 conference organized by Chicago architect Stanley Tigerman, which invited leading American designers to Chicago to discuss the current state of the field. The first biennial announced it had more than 500,000 visitors, and plans for its return in 2017.

The second iteration was in 2017 with the theme Make New History, and ran from September 16, 2017, through January 7, 2018. The lead curators were Mark Lee and Sharon Johnson of Johnson Marklee. Associate curators include Sarah Hearne and Letizia Garzoli. The opening coincided with EXPO Chicago, the international contemporary art fair. More than 100 architectural practices from the Americas, Asia and Europe were selected to participate. In addition to the main site at the Cultural Center, the biennial partnered with the Chicago Community Trust to hold 2017 events at six satellite locations in other parts of Chicago: The Beverly Arts Center, DePaul Art Museum, DuSable Museum of African American History, Hyde Park Art Center, the National Museum of Mexican Art, and the National Museum of Puerto Rican Arts and Culture. The second biennial drew a crowd of 550,000 and dates for a third biennial beginning in September 2019 were announced.

The third biennial, under the title . . . And Other Such Stories, explores the circumstances that make the urban architectural environment. Its lead curator was Yesomi Umolu, and it was co-curated by Sepake Angiama and Paulo Tavares. It was open to the public from September 19, 2019, to January 5, 2020. The exposition features over 80 contributors from more than 20 countries. The third iteration of the biennial focused on four main themes: land and belonging, architecture and memory, rights and advocacy, and collaboration and discussion. The Los Angeles Times found the 2019 biennial "eerily prescient" in its examination of contested urban land use issues at a time of international protest.

== See also ==
- Architecture in Chicago
- Chicago Cultural Center
- EXPO Chicago
- Venice Biennale
