= Sherin Guirguis =

Egyptian artist (born 1974)

- Born: 1974 (age 51–52); Luxor

Sherin Guirguis (born 1974 in Luxor, Egypt) is a visual artist based in Los Angeles, California. Guirguis has had solo exhibitions of her work at 18th Street Art Center (Santa Monica, California), The Third Line Gallery (Dubai), Shulamit Nazarian Gallery (Venice, California), and LAXART (Los Angeles). In 2012, Guirguis received the California Community Foundation Fellowship for Visual Artists and the 2014–15 City of Los Angeles Individual Artist Fellowship.

Her work is acquired or held in the collections of the Los Angeles County Museum of Art, Museum of Fine Arts, Houston, Orange County Museum of Art, Las Vegas Art Museum, U.S. Department of State, and Metropolitan Authority Los Angeles. Guirguis is an associate professor in the Practice of Fine Art at the Roski School of Art and Design at the University of Southern California.

Guirguis draws from Western and Middle Eastern influences as is seen in her Mashrabiya patterns punctuated by a bold neon palette.

Her work was showcased at the Desert X exhibit in the Coachella Valley from February 25 – April 30, 2017. The Aviation/Century station for the Los Angeles Metro Rail system incorporates her artwork.

== Exhibitions ==
- Desert X (group), AlUla, (2019-2020)
- Of Thorns and Love (solo), Craft and Folk Art Museum, Los Angeles, CA (2018)
- My Place is the Placeless (solo), 18th Street Arts Center, Los Angeles, CA (2017)
- El Beit El Kabir (solo), Third Line Gallery, Dubai, UAE
