= Neville Wakefield =

British art curator

- Born: 1963 (age 62–63); England
- Occupation: Art curator
- Notable work: Desert X

Neville Wakefield (born 1963) is an art curator.

== Life and work ==
Wakefield was born in England, United Kingdom. He is the curator and artistic director of Desert X.

== Personal life ==
He lives and works between the Isles of Scilly and Harlem, New York.

== See also ==
- POSTmatter (magazine)
- Helmut Lang (artist)
- Destricted
- The Cremaster Cycle
