= Claudia Comte =

Swiss artist

- Born: 1983 (age 42–43); Grancy, Switzerland
- Education: École cantonale d'art de Lausanne
- Known for: Sculpture, installation art, wall painting
- Website: www.claudiacomte.ch

Claudia Comte (born 1983 in Grancy, Switzerland) is a Swiss artist. She lives and works in Basel. Comte works in a variety of media including sculpture, engraving, installation murals and painting.

== Education ==
Comte studied visual arts at the École cantonale d'art de Lausanne (ECAL) from 2004 to 2007. She subsequently completed a master's degree in science of education at the Haute École pédagogique in Lausanne in 2010.

== Work ==
Comte became known for wooden sculptures carved with a chainsaw and finished by hand, typically presented within site-specific installations that combine sculpture with graphic, geometric wall paintings. Her work references the geometric vocabulary of modernist art while introducing elements of play and humour. Her first solo exhibition in the United States, No Melon No Lemon, was held at Gladstone Gallery in New York in 2015.

In 2016 she installed a group of six-ton Carrara marble sculptures in the form of rabbits in City Hall Park in Manhattan as part of a Public Art Fund exhibition, and in 2017 her work Curves and Zig Zags was shown at the inaugural Desert X exhibition in the Coachella Valley. Also in 2017, her installation NOW I WON, curated by Chus Martínez, occupied the Messeplatz at Art Basel: a functioning funfair with seven activity booths set beneath a large-scale sculpture spelling out the palindromic title.

From 2018 her work increasingly engaged with marine ecology. After taking part in a TBA21–Academy expedition to New Zealand in 2018, she completed a residency at the Alligator Head Foundation in Port Antonio, Jamaica, in 2019. During the residency she created The Cacti Series, a group of cast concrete cactus sculptures permanently installed on the seabed of the East Portland Fish Sanctuary; the sculptures were designed to serve as a substrate for coral growth as part of the sanctuary's reef regeneration programme. The forms were based on wooden sculptures Comte had carved with a chainsaw and then reproduced in reinforced concrete using 3D scanning. Work developed during the residency was later shown in the exhibition After Nature at the Museo Nacional Thyssen-Bornemisza in Madrid in 2021.

Comte has also worked in marble. Her public installation Five Marble Leaves (2022) at Central Wharf Park in Boston consists of leaf-shaped Carrara marble sculptures accompanied by plaques quoting environmental activists including Greta Thunberg, Jane Goodall and David Attenborough.
