= Lorenzi Park, Las Vegas =

Lorenzi Park
- Location within Nevada
- Location: Las Vegas
- Coordinates: 36°10′41″N 115°11′05″W
- Opened: 1926-1940, 2013-

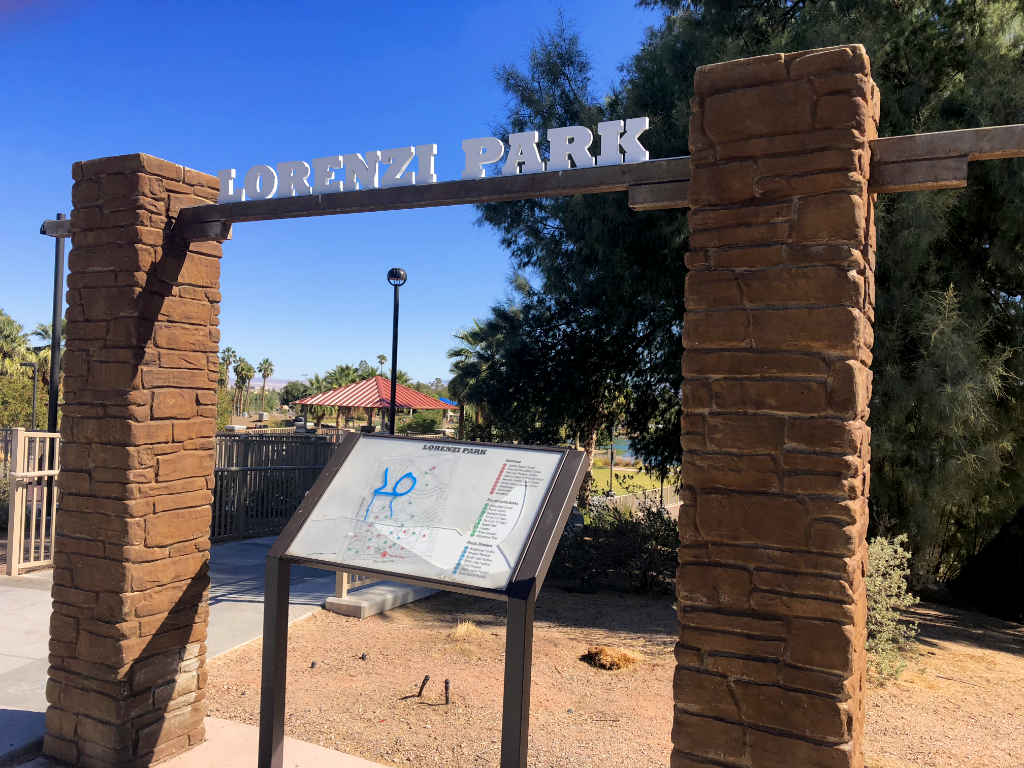
Lorenzi Park in Las Vegas.

Lorenzi Park is one of the first parks in the City of Las Vegas. It was originally a vision of French immigrant, David G. Lorenzi. In 1911 Lorenzi came to the Las Vegas Valley lured by the rumors of artesian wells that would transform the desert to farm land. He purchased 80 acres (32 ha) of property on the outskirts of town, about two miles west current downtown Fremont Street area in 1912.

When Lorenzi drilled one of the most abundant wells of its time, it fostered dreams David brought with him from France, to create a vineyard in the desert to make European-styled wines. However in 1912 Las Vegas was more of a beer and whiskey town so the vineyard idea quickly died. The abundance of water there allowed Lorenzi to create the signature lakes one can see rebuilt today.

The property first opened as Lorenzi’s Lake Park in 1926 with a pool, dance pavilion, two lakes with an island in each and orchards. Lorenzi charged very little to enter into the Resort. He made his money from the amenities he provided. It became the local destination with rowboats, ice cream, fireworks, prize fights, horse races, dance contests, beauty pageants, a band shell with weekly bands. The shell even doubled as an outdoor movie screen. The resort was busy during the prohibition era. It became a place where local socialites could go to ignore prohibition.

Lorenzi wanted to sell the property for use as a city park. He offered it to the city for $70,000 in 1936. Unfortunately the city stated it was too far out of their budget. The property sold in 1940 to become Twin Lakes Lodge, a resort getaway with a 48-room hotel. In the 1950s with the emergence of the Nevada Test Site, Twin Lakes hosted scientists and their families that worked there. Twin Lakes was prominent in another local "industry", dude ranching and divorce in Nevada.

In most jurisdictions divorces were hard to get. You could not state, "irrevocable differences" and seek a divorce. The resort played an important role as Divorce seekers were able to stay at the motel the six weeks required to establish residency. The motel also presented a "Western" experience offering horseback riding, rodeo events, fishing, and food.

By 1965 the resort was finally purchased for $750,000 by the city to become a city park. The remaining motel buildings and the two lakes give us an important glimpse of Las Vegas's past. In 2013 the City of Las Vegas re-opened Lorenzi Park after a $30 million upgrade. The lake has been completely redone and reverted to its Twin Lake configuration. The band shell on the island has returned. New amenities have been created while keeping the flavor of the old resort.
