= Sush Machida Gaikotsu =

Japanese artist

- Born: June 21, 1973 (age 52)
- Known for: Painting, Installation art

Sush Machida Gaikotsu is a Japanese artist. He lives and works in Las Vegas, Nevada. His artwork has been exhibited internationally. Machida received his M.F.A. (2002) from the University of Nevada, Las Vegas. He is represented by Western Project, Los Angeles, among others.

== Artwork ==
Los Angeles Times art critic David Pagel wrote "It's a rare instance of less-is-more magic, when a strictly limited number of judicious decisions intensifies the effect of the whole. Pop art never looked more scorchingly gorgeous or wickedly Zen."

== Books ==
- Douglas Bullis. 100 Artists of the West Coast, Schiffer Publishing, Atglen, Pennsylvania
- 702 Series, Sush Machida Gaikotsu, Las Vegas Art Museum Press
