= Yesomi Umolu =

British curator and writer

- Born: 1983 or 1984 (age 40–41); Lagos, Nigeria
- Education: University of Edinburgh (MA); Royal College of Art (MA)
- Occupation(s): Curator and writer
- Employer: Serpentine Galleries
- Website: www.yesomiumolu.com

Yesomi Umolu (born 1983 or 1984) is a British curator of contemporary art and writer who has been director of curatorial affairs and public practice for the Serpentine Galleries since 2020.

Umolu previously held curatorial positions at the Walker Art Center, the Eli and Edythe Broad Art Museum at Michigan State University, and the Logan Center for the Arts at the University of Chicago. She then served as artistic director of the Chicago Architecture Biennial 2019 before assuming her current position at the Serpentine Galleries.

Umolu has published works in publications such as Art in America and Afterimage, and has written and spoken on issues surrounding diversity and structural racism in museums.

== Early life and education ==
Yesomi Umolu was born and raised in Lagos, Nigeria. Her mother taught English and her father was a civil servant. She moved to London at the age of ten. As a teenager, she was involved with an arts group at Tate Modern.

Umolu earned a master's degree in architectural design from the University of Edinburgh. After practising as an architect for a couple of years, Umolu pursued art curation due to an interest in the "discourse and social relations that the built environment generates". She earned a master's degree in contemporary art curating from the Royal College of Art in 2010.

== Curatorial work ==
In her early career, Umolu contributed to programming at Tate Modern and Iniva and held positions at the European biennial of contemporary art Manifesta 8 and the Serpentine Gallery. In 2012 she became a curatorial fellow at the Walker Art Center in Minneapolis, Minnesota, United States. There, she organised the first solo U.S. exhibition for artists Karen Mirza and Brad Butler, titled The Museum of Non Participation: The New Deal, and worked on various other exhibitions.

Umolu next served as assistant curator at the Eli and Edythe Broad Art Museum at Michigan State University, where she organised programs focused on global contemporary art. In 2014, she organised John Akomfrah: Imaginary Possessions, the first U.S. museum exhibition focusing on the recent work of British artist John Akomfrah. Other exhibitions include Focus: Pao Houa Her (2015), The Land Grant: Forest Law (2014), and Revelations: Examining Democracy (2013). Her last curatorial project at the Broad, Material Effects, examined the work of six artists from West African countries. In a review of the exhibition for Hyperallergic, art critic Sarah Rose Sharp stated that "Umolu has done an impressive job of transporting the objects and the artists of Africa here to Michigan, where, in exchange, they can transport us back to Africa." The City Pulse in Lansing, Michigan, noted the depth at which the exhibition could be enjoyed, such as the texture and colors of objects within the exhibition or the underlying philosophy.

The University of Chicago named Umolu exhibitions curator of its Logan Center for the Arts in 2015. In addition to her curatorial work, she also lectured on contemporary visual art and spatial practices at the university. The following year, in 2016, she was awarded a curatorial fellowship from the Andy Warhol Foundation. Her 2018 exhibition Candice Lin: A Hard White Body, a Porous Slip, curated with Katja Rivera, was named one of the top 20 U.S. exhibitions of the year by Hyperallergic. As artistic director of the Chicago Architecture Biennial 2019, Umolu worked alongside co-curators Sepake Angiama and Paulo Tavares and oversaw a curatorial program that featured the works of more than eighty collectives and firms placed in forty locations across Chicago. Architectural Record remarked that the biennial's programming offered "incisive critiques of how architecture and design work within systems of power, racism, colonialism, and inequality" and noted the greater integration of exhibitions into the city compared to previous biennials.

Umolu was named director of curatorial affairs and public practice for the Serpentine Galleries in London in 2020. Her responsibilities in this position include improving the inclusivity and accessibility of the Serpentine's programming.

== Writing ==
Umolu's writing has appeared in various journals including Art in America and Afterimage. She has also written and spoken on issues surrounding diversity and structural racism in museums.

In June 2020, Umolu published an Instagram post entitled "14 Points on the Limits of Knowledge and Care" on the direct historical connection of museums to the "colonial impulse to collect"; how these institutions could acknowledge this condition; and "seek to build anew along antiracist and decolonized lines" amidst protests against systemic racism towards black people. She wrote an op-ed on the same subject for Artnet News later that month.
