= Pia Camil =

Mexican artist (born 1980)

- Born: 1980 (age 45–46); Mexico City, Mexico
- Education: Rhode Island School of Design, Slade School of Fine Art
- Website: piacamil.me

Pia Camil (born 1980) is a Mexican contemporary artist. Camil works in painting, sculpture, installation and performance.

== Biography ==
Pia Camil was born in 1980 in Mexico City, Mexico. Camil was raised in Mexico City.

Camil focused on studying painting in her college education. She earned a B.F.A. in Painting in 2003 from the Rhode Island School of Design, and an M.F.A. in 2008 from the Slade School of Fine Art, in London.

Camil’s work is usually associated with the Mexican urban landscape, the aesthetic language of modernism and its relationship to retail and advertising. Recently she has engaged in public participation as a way to activate the work and engage with the politics of consumerism.

Her work is included in many public museum collections including Solomon R. Guggenheim Museum, Centre Pompidou, Blanton Museum of Art, and others.

== Awards and honors ==
- Nominated for the Paul Hamlyn Award for visual artists, London (2008).
- European Honors Program recognition, Palazzo Cenci, Rome (2021).

== Exhibitions ==
=== Solo exhibitions ===
- Velo Revelo, Clark Art Institute, Williamstown, Massachusetts (2020).
- Three Works, Museum of Contemporary Art Tucson, Arizona (2021).
- Pia Camil: Three Works, Museum of Contemporary Art, Tucson (already present).
- Telón de Boca, Museo Universitario del Chopo, Mexico City (2018).
- Fade to Black: Sit, Relax, Look, SCAD Museum, Savannah, Georgia (2018).
- Bara, Bara, Bara, Dallas Contemporary, Texas (2017).
- Divisor Pirata, NuMu, Guatemala City (2016).
- A Pot for A Latch, Manetti Shrem Museum (UC Davis, 2016); also at New Museum, NYC (2016).
- Slats, Skins & Shopfittings, Blum & Poe, New York City (2016).

=== Group exhibitions ===
- Aichi Triennial 2019, Nagoya, Japan. (2019)
- 2019 Desert X Biennial, Camil's work was co-created with Cinthia Marcelle. (2019)
