= Las Vegas–Clark County Library District =

Public library system in Nevada, U.S.

Coordinates: 36.042493°N 115.246308°W

- Location: Las Vegas, Nevada
- Branches: 25

Collection
- Size: 3.6 Million

Access and use
- Circulation: 9.7 Million
- Population served: 1.7 Million

Other information
- Director: Kelvin Watson
- Employees: 729
- Website: lvccld.org

Las Vegas–Clark County Library District (LVCCLD) is an independent government agency. Operations are overseen by a ten-member Board of Trustees, five appointed by the Clark County Commission and five appointed by the Las Vegas City Council. LVCCLD is headquartered at the Windmill Library Service Center at 7060 W. Windmill Ln., Las Vegas, NV

The district services Clark County, including Las Vegas; the system does not operate branches in Henderson and North Las Vegas. However, the North Las Vegas Library District and Boulder City Library have contracts with LVCCLD for automation services. This enables the North Las Vegas Library District's and Boulder City's items to appear in the online catalog of LVCCLD.

== Services ==
In addition to loaning traditional materials to the public, LVCCLD also provides:

- Free Wi-Fi
- Public computers
- Printing, copying and faxing services
- Curbside pickup
- Searchable databases
- Online resources (eBooks, audiobooks, magazines, movies & TV, music, online courses, and more)
- Interlibrary Loans (ILL) with libraries across the country
- Various events and exhibits throughout the year
- Homework help centers
- Homebound services
- Storytimes
- Toy lending library
- iPad and Wi-Fi hotspot lending
- Makerspaces
- and more...

== Branches ==
The system has 13 urban branches and 11 outlying branches.

=== Centennial Hills Library ===
- Located at 6711 N Buffalo Dr., Las Vegas, NV 89131, adjacent to the Centennial Hills Park
- LEED certified gold building, constructed to reduce negative environmental impacts and improve occupant health and well-being
- Public computers
- Homework help center
- Meeting room with 60-seat capacity
- Study rooms
- Used bookstore
- Café area

=== Clark County Library ===
- Located at 1401 E Flamingo Rd, Las Vegas, NV 89119
- Originally opened in 1971, remodeled in 1986 and again in 1994 to a design by noted architect Michael Graves.
- 400-seat community theater for performing arts events and 80-seat Paul C. Blau Theatre
- Study rooms
- Best Buy Teen Tech Center
- Houses the Southern Nevada Nonprofit Information Center
- Used bookstore
- Public computers
- Adult learning program office

=== Enterprise Library ===
- Located at 8310 S Las Vegas Blvd, Las Vegas, NV 89123, on the world famous Las Vegas Strip
- Study rooms
- Meeting room
- Public computers
- COX Teen STEAM LAB
- Used bookstore

=== East Las Vegas Library ===
- Located at 2851 E Bonanza Rd, Las Vegas, NV 89101
- Built From Scratch Tech Lab (music production and video editing workstations, along with industry-standard DJ equipment and isolated sound booth for recording)
- Robot LAB
- Homework help center with free tutoring
- Toy lending library
- Outdoor play area
- Demonstration kitchen
- Multipurpose room is a large space available to enjoy educational lectures, personal and cultural enrichment, and social events. The public can rent this room for meetings, live performances, private parties, and any special occasion
- Career services offered at the One-Stop Career Center
- Public computers
- Café
- Adult learning program office

=== Meadows Library ===
- The branch is an outreach branch in the Chester A. Stupak Community Center.

=== Rainbow Library ===
- Located at3150 N Buffalo Dr., Las Vegas, NV 89128
- Public computer
- Meeting room
- Study rooms

=== Sahara West Library ===
- Located at 9600 W Sahara Ave, Las Vegas, NV 89117
- Library Foundation used bookstore
- 160-seat multipurpose room
- 60-seat glass room
- 45-seat board room
- Public computers
- Study rooms
- 3D printer for teens
- Art gallery

=== Spring Valley Library ===
- Located at 4280 S Jones Blvd, Las Vegas, NV 89103
- Art Gallery
- Public computers
- 50 person capacity conference room

=== Summerlin Library ===
- Located at 1771 Inner Circle Dr., Las Vegas, NV 89134
- Art gallery
- Used bookstore
- Public computers
- 284-seat theater
- 40-seat conference room
- Study rooms

=== Sunrise Library ===
- Located at 5400 E Harris Ave, Las Vegas, NV 89110
- Established in 1987
- Study rooms
- Used bookstore
- Teen Zone
- Public computers

=== West Charleston Library ===
- Located at 6301 W Charleston Blvd, Las Vegas, NV 89146
- Art gallery
- Used bookstore
- Study rooms
- 276-seat lecture hall
- Public Computers

=== West Las Vegas Library ===
- Located at 951 W Lake Mead Blvd, Las Vegas, NV 89106
- 298-seat theatre
- Homework help center
- Public Computers
- Meeting room
- Art gallery
- 3D Printer

=== Whitney Library ===
- Located at 5175 E Tropicana Ave, Las Vegas, NV 89122
- Art gallery
- 520-square-foot conference room
- Used bookstore
- Meeting room
- Study rooms
- Public computer

=== Windmill Library ===
- Located at 7060 W Windmill Ln, Las Vegas, NV 89113
- Opened in 2011
- Adjacent Service Center houses the Library District's administrative offices, support functions and processing center
- Public computers
- Passport services
- Study rooms
- Meeting room

=== Outlying branches ===
==== Blue Diamond Library (Unincorporated area) ====
- The library opened in 1970; it consisted of a trailer purchased with a Federal Grant. In 1989 a resident constructed a 1,000-square-foot (93 m^{2}) building that became the permanent library. As of 2009 it has over 7,000 volumes.

==== Bunkerville Library (Unincorporated area) ====
- The library opened in 1968 in a portion of a former school gymnasium. As of 2009 it occupies a building shared with the Parks and Recreation Department.

==== Goodsprings Library (Unincorporated area) ====
- The library opened in 1968 in a former mining house owned by the librarian's parents. In 1970 it moved into a trailer which it occupies as of 2009.

==== Indian Springs Library (Unincorporated area) ====
- The 1,200-square-foot (110 m^{2}) library occupies an area shared with the Senior Center and has 7,500 volumes.

==== Laughlin Library (Unincorporated area) ====
- In 1987 the library began in a storefront. A permanent branch opened in 1994. The library is the largest of the rural branches.

==== Mesquite Library (Mesquite) ====
- The branch opened in 1968 and, as of 2009, houses 28,000 volumes.

==== Moapa Town Library (Unincorporated area) ====
- The 2,000-square-foot (190 m^{2}) library serves the Moapa Town community.

==== Moapa Valley Library (Unincorporated area) ====
- The library first opened in 1967 and received a new facility in 1987. As of 2009 it has 22,500 volumes.

==== Mount Charleston Library (Unincorporated area) ====
- The library has a 2,800-square-foot (260 m^{2}) facility.

==== Sandy Valley Library (Unincorporated area) ====
- In 1984 the library began in the closet of a former community center. As of 2009 it shares a 1,200-square-foot (110 m^{2}) building with a community center and has 6,200 volumes.

==== Searchlight Library (Unincorporated area) ====
- The library opened in 1969. In 1984 the library moved into a building constructed with Federal Block Grant money. The library, which shares the building with the Health Clinic and the Searchlight Museum, has more than 7,000 articles.

== Awards ==
Library of the Future Award 2024, 2023, 2022. The award, sponsored by the American Library Association (ALA) and Information Today, Inc., annually recognizes innovative planning, application, or development of focused patron support relating to information technology in libraries.
