= Kaz Oshiro =

Japanese-American artist (born 1967)

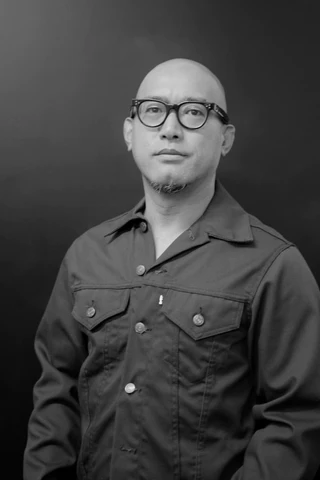

Kaz Oshiro is a Japanese-American artist based in Los Angeles, CA. His work resides between painting and sculpture, creating uncannily realistic objects that have ranged from a full-size replica of a dumpster to a mini fridge adorned with stickers, however, through the use of stretcher bars, canvas, and paint.

His work has been exhibited at museums and galleries including Apex Art, the Swiss Institute and the Asia Society and Museum in New York, the Cincinnati Contemporary Arts Center, the Orange County Museum of Art, UCLA Hammer Museum in Los Angeles, the Royal Academy in London, and Veletrzni Palace in Prague. His work appears in Lifelike, a group show at the Walker Art Center, the New Orleans Museum of Art, the Museum of Contemporary Art, San Diego, and the Blanton Museum of Art.

Oshiro is represented by Rosamund Felsen Gallery in Santa Monica, California and in Paris by Galerie Frank Elbaz.

== Biography ==
Born 1967 in Okinawa, Japan, Oshiro emigrated to the United States in 1986 and studied at California State University, Los Angeles, graduating with a BA in 1998 and an MFA in 2002.

== Artwork ==
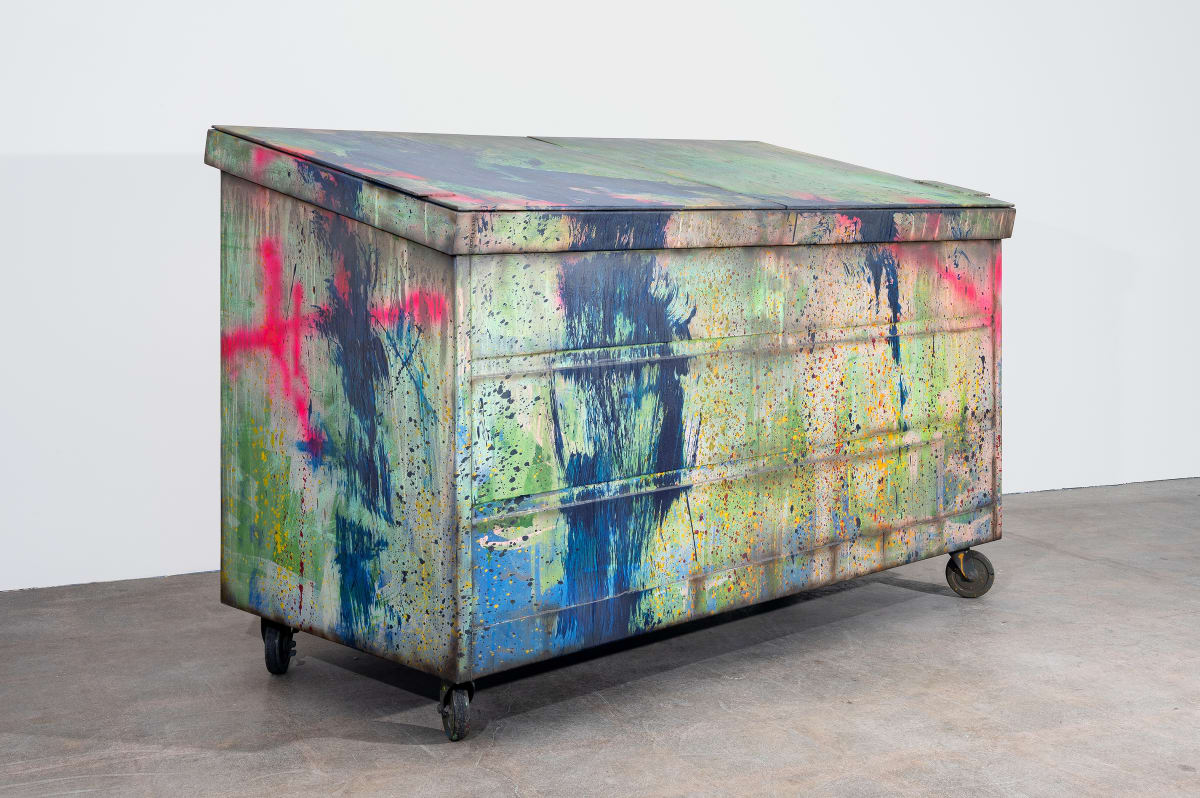

Oshiro's work rides the fine line between sculpture and real life objects. What may initially appear to be an everyday fast food trash can or a set of guitar amplifiers, a closer look will reveal to viewers that the piece itself is merely a painting on a custom stretched and created canvas. Complete with details made to resemble time and human's impact on these objects (i.e. markings to resemble scratches and tears, dust, etc.), his work uses a realist technique for the paintings to blend seamlessly into its placed environment.

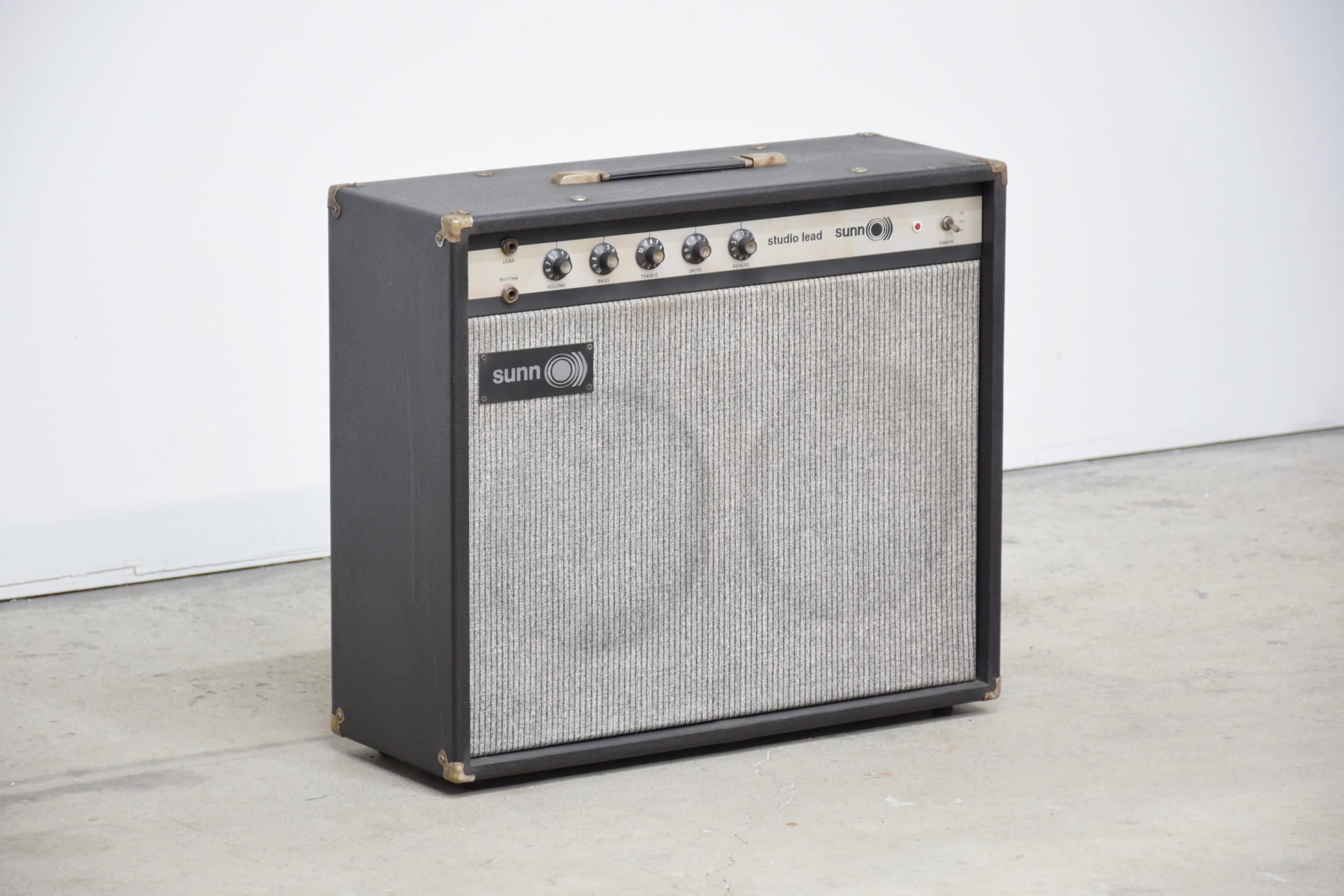

== Exhibitions ==
=== Solo exhibitions ===
- Republic, Maki Gallery [Tennoz], Tokyo, JP, 2020
- 96375, Nonaka-Hill, Los Angeles, CA, 2020
- Reformation, Galerie Frank Elbaz, Paris, FR 2017
- A Standard, Honor Fraser, Los Angeles, CA, 2017
- Kaz Oshiro, Honor Fraser, Los Angeles, CA, 2015
- Diffuse Reflection, Galerie Frank Elbaz, Paris, FR, 2015
- Chasing Ghosts, LACMA's Charles White Elementary School Gallery, Los Angeles, CA, 2014
- Logical Disjunction, Galerie Perrotin, Hong Kong, HK, 2013
- Still Life, Honor Fraser, Los Angeles, CA, 2013
- Sunset Drone, Las Cienegas Project, Los Angeles, CA, 2011
- Zeuxis pop, Villa du Parc, Annemasse, FR 2011
- Sundowner, Galerie Perrotin, Miami, FL, 2010
- Home Anthology 2, Las Cienegas Project, Los Angeles, CA, 2010
- Home Anthology, Galerie Frank Elbaz, Paris, France, 2010
- Never Can Say Goodbye, Tower Records Store, in collaboration with No Longer Empty, New York, NY, 2010
- False Gestures, Rosamund Felsen Gallery, Santa Monica, CA, 2009
- Setting Sun, Yvon Lambert Gallery, New York, NY, 2009
- Kaz Oshiro, Sorry We’re Closed, Galerie Rodolphe Janssen, Brussels, BE, 2008
- Untitled Recordings, Clear Gallery, Tokyo, JP, 2008
- Common Noise, Galerie Frank Elbaz, Paris, FR, 2007
- Room Acoustics, Tokyo Institute of Technology, Tokyo, JP, 2007
- Kaz Oshiro, Paintings and Works on Paper, 1999-2006, Las Vegas Art Museum, Las Vegas, NV, 2007
- New Works, Project Room, Yvon Lambert Gallery, New York, NY, 2007
- Driving with Dementia, Rosamund Felsen Gallery, Santa Monica, CA, 2006
- Subpar, Steven Wolf Gallery, San Francisco, CA, 2006
- Project Series 27, Kaz Oshiro, Pomona College Museum of Art, Claremont, CA, 2005
- Drone, Rosamund Felsen Gallery, Santa Monica, CA, 2005
- Room Acoustics, Tokyo Hipsters Club, Inart Gallery, Tokyo, Japan, 2005
- Out-n-In, Rosamund Felsen Gallery, Santa Monica, CA, 2004
- 2002 Pet Sounds, Vol. 13: No Sound, More Alchemy, California State University, Los Angeles, CA, 2002
- Pop Tatari (Curse of Pop Music), Rosamund Felsen Gallery, Santa Monica, CA, 2002

== Public Collections ==
Fonds national d’art contemporain, Paris

Frederick R. Weisman Art Foundation, Los Angeles, CA

Los Angeles County Museum of Art (LACMA), Los Angeles, CA

The Margulies Collection at the Warehouse, Miami, FL

The Museum of Contemporary Art, Los Angeles, CA

Nora Eccles Harrison Museum of Art, Logan, UT

Oakland Museum of California, Oakland, CA

Peter Norton Family Foundation, Santa Monica, CA

Rubell Museum, Miami, FL

Sheldon Museum of Art, Lincoln, NE

Zabludowicz Collection, London
