= CASSTL =

Artist space in Antwerp, Belgium

C A S S T L
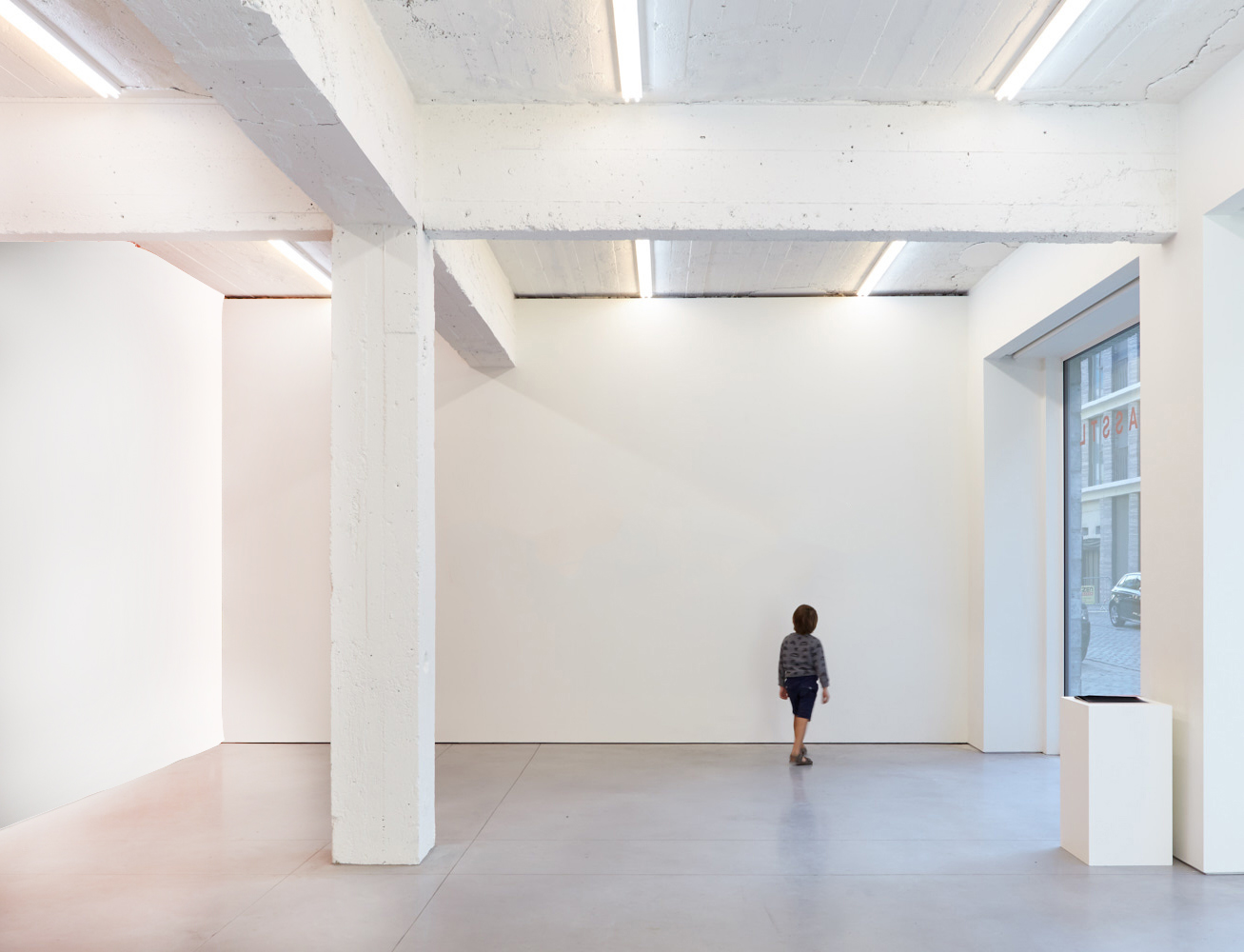
- Established: 2017; 9 years ago
- Founders: Luc Tuymans, Carla Arocha & Stéphane Schraenen
- Type: Artist-run space
- Location(s): Braziliëstraat 27; 2000 Antwerp
- Coordinates: 51.2320°N 4.4042°E
- Website: Official website

CASSTL is a Belgian artist-run space in Antwerp. It was founded in 2017 when a series of artists started organizing alternative spaces for emerging art. The name "CASSTL" is an acronym that refers to the initials of the founders: Venezuelan-Belgian artist duo Carla Arocha and Stéphane Schraenen, and Belgian painter Luc Tuymans. CASSTL organizes project-based exhibitions, performances, readings, and screenings, publishes editions, and organizes other events by local and international artists. The opening exhibition with its title No Pressure expressed the leitmotif of the initiators: no pressure, no coercion.

In a 2017 interview, Luc Tuymans said the following about CASSTL:

CASSTL is a refreshing addition to the Antwerp exhibition circuit. As a curator, artists can give art a different perspective. They can also launch other types of spaces that function more smoothly and freely. The programming of CASSTL can be unpredictable and even remain irresponsible.

In 2019, Los Angeles breakout art star Gabriela Ruiz performed at CASSTL with a work that played with body and identity where she was seen on a bed of Zote laundry soap, touching on issues of domesticity and labor.

== Exhibitions and Projects ==
The following is a chronological list of exhibitions held at CASSTL in Antwerp, Belgium.

- Filip Collin: Come and Play With Filip, March 11–April 14, 2017.
- No Pressure, May 19–21, 2017. (Hans Belmer, John McCracken, Robert Mapplethorpe, François Morellet, Jack Whitten)
- Nils Verkaeren: 11937 km, June 9–11, 2017.
- David Wauters: Currency, June 23–25, 2017.
- Eric Thielemans, September 10, 2017.
- Ben van den Berghe & Alexey Shlyk: The Plastic Number, September 23–24, 2017.
- Nel Aerts: Lord Nelson FW17, November 18–19, 2017.
- Emmanuel Botalatala: L’Homme Moderne Jette Tout, November 25–26, 2017.
- Carla Arocha & Stéphane Schraenen, A Studio Visit, December 16, 2017 – January 31, 2018.
- Gustav Metzger: Eichmann and the Angel, January 28–February 16, 2018. Co-organized with WEST, Haag and Gustav Metzger Estate.
- Koen Roggen: Empty Trash – Sound Archive 1998-2020, April 1, 2018.
- Karl Holmqvist, March 22, 2018. Co-organized with Pinkie Bowtie.
- Zlatko Kopljar: Empty, August 31–September 2, 2018.
- Iris Rombouts: The Poetry of the Bee, October 26–28, 2018. (Book launch)
- Guillaume Bijl: Adriaen Brouwer Anno 2018, December 1, 2018.
- Raphaël Vandeputte: BANG THE BOX, December 16–23, 2018.
- Gert Verhoeven: à redouter, January 27, 2019.
- Margaret Welsh: Was I Not That?, May 16–26, 2019.
- ec·dy·sis, curated by Shirley Morales, September 7–29, 2019. Co-organized with ltd Los Angeles, Los Angeles, CA, U.S.
  (Skip Arnold, Ron Athey, Rafa Esparza, Anna Garner, Aimee Goguen, Todd Gray, Spencer Lewis, Gabriela Ruiz, Ilana Savdie)
