= Ilana Savdie =

American artist

- Born: 1986
- Education: Yale School of Art, MFA; Rhode Island School of Design, BFA
- Known for: Painting, Drawing
- Awards: NXTHVN Fellowship, 2020

Ilana Savdie (born 1986) is a visual artist working primarily as a painter. Savdie was raised between Barranquilla, Colombia and Miami, Florida. Her solo exhibition Ilava Savdie: Radical Contradictions at the Whitney Museum of American Art, in 2023, presented an expansive view of her pictorial interests and artistic practice. She lives and works in Brooklyn, New York.

== Early life and education ==
Ilana Savdie grew up in Barranquilla, Colombia, in the South American country, and Miami, United States. She received a BFA (2008) from Rhode Island School of Design (RISD), Providence, and an MFA (2018) from Yale School of Art at Yale University, New Haven.

== Work ==
Savdie's colorful large-scale paintings and drawings depict abstract visual investigations and distinct techniques. From visible brushstrokes to blurred patterns, she uses acrylic, oil, and beeswax to bring her compositions to life. In her canvases, themes of identity, the body, beauty, individual and collective expressions, and regional manifestations such as Barranquilla Carnaval celebrations are mixed into the pictorial space.

In 2017, she was shortlisted by New American Paintings magazine. In 2019, she was participated in a group show at CASSTL, Antwerp, with artists Rafa Sparza, Skip Arnold, Ron Athey, among others. Savdie received NXTHVN Fellowship and was an artist-in-residence in New Haven, alongside artists Vincent Valdez and Esteban Ramón Pérez, in 2020. Her first solo exhibition in the United Kingdom was presented at White Cube gallery, London, in 2022.

In 2023, her work on paper was included in the artists' list for the Drawing Center's benefit auction in New York. Savdie's work on canvas was included in the National Gallery of Victoria's 2023 NGV Triennial, in Australia.

The solo show Ilava Savdie: Radical Contradictions (2023) at the Whitney Museum of American Art displayed a set of newly created works that investigate the physical body, collective experiences, and traditional approaches to abstract painting.

She was a visiting lecturer at New York Studio School in 2023 and at Tyler School of Art and Architecture from Temple University, Pennsylvania, in 2024. For her solo show Extopia, her first in France taking stage at White Cube gallery, Ilana Savdie, is expanding on her investigation about abstraction and the body.

== Collections (selection) ==
Ilana Savdie's work is included in international public and private collections. Her artworks can be found at the Pérez Art Museum Miami, Florida; Green Family Art Foundation; Burger Collection, Hong Kong; the Whitney Museum of American Art, New York; the San Francisco Museum of Modern Art, California; the Hammer Museum, Los Angeles, California; the Jewish Museum, New York; Museum of Fine Arts, Boston, Massachusetts; the Montréal Museum of Fine Arts, Canada; the Santa Barbara Museum of Art, California; and the Museum of Contemporary Art, San Diego, California, among others.
