= C2H6O =

The molecular formula C_{2}H_{6}O (molar mass: 46.07 g/mol, exact mass: 46.0419 u) may refer to:

- Dimethyl ether (DME, or methoxymethane)
- Ethanol

== Other ==
- The name of an exhibition by Carla Arocha and Stéphane Schraenen
