= Carla Arocha and Stéphane Schraenen =

Venezuelan and Belgian visual artist duo

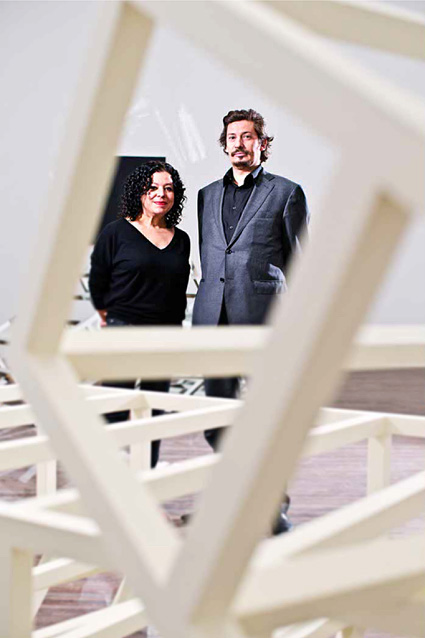
- From left to right, Carla Arocha and Stéphane Schraenen. Photograph by Jean-Pierre Stoop.
- Born: Carla Arocha: Caracas, Venezuela; 30 August 1961 (age 64); Stéphane Schraenen: Antwerp, Belgium; 19 September 1971 (age 54)
- Education: Carla Arocha: School of the Art Institute of Chicago; University of Illinois at Chicago; Stéphane Schraenen: AP Hogeschool Antwerpen; Royal Academy of Fine Arts (Antwerp)
- Movement: Sculpture, Installation art
- Website: www.arocha-schraenen.com

Carla Arocha (born 30 October 1961) and Stéphane Schraenen (born 19 September 1971), also shortened to Arocha & Schraenen, are an artist duo that collaborates since 2006. Arocha & Schraenen work across media, producing paintings, drawings and prints. Large-scale mirrored and interactive sculptural installations are at the core of their collaborative project. Their abstract installations and sculptures stem from everyday objects. The artists strip such objects from functionality, thus reducing them to their basic essence and form. Engaging with the rich tradition of geometrical abstract and optical art, the artists’ works are often placed in a spatial context where light and reflection play a crucial role.

== Education and early career ==
Carla Arocha is born in Venezuela (Caracas) and Arocha grew up in a family of lawyers, whose interest in the humanities and culture had an impact on her education. Moreover, the rich legacy of modern and contemporary art of her home country Venezuela, with Jesús Rafael Soto, Carlos Cruz-Diez and Alejandro Otero, to name just a few, has left a profound impact on her as well as the architecture and public artworks scattered through the city of Caracas. In December 1979, she moved to Chicago where she studied biology at Saint Xavier University, Chicago, from which she obtained a Bachelor of Science (1986). After training as a biologist Carla Arocha radically changed course and steered her path to an artistic career, first studying for a Bachelor of Fine Arts, SAIC School of the Art Institute (1991) before pursuing her studies for a Master of Fine Arts, University of Illinois at Chicago (1994).

Stéphane Schraenen born in Belgium (Antwerp), studied Communication and Journalism at the AP Hogeschool Antwerpen (1992–1994) and studied Graphic Design at the Royal Academy of Fine Arts in Antwerp (1994–1996).

Arocha and Schraenen met in the late 2000s, and subsequently worked together in 2006 on a series of works for Carla Arocha's solo exhibitions Dirt at Kunsthalle Bern in Switzerland and Chris at the Fonds régional d’art contemporain Auvergne in Clermont-Ferrand. Their first collaborative venture was the 2007 exhibition Marauders, Monique Meloche Gallery in Chicago. As they mentioned in an interview in 2014, a central part of their collaborative process is to 'exchange ideas, which are then completed and produced together'.

== Work ==
The work of Arocha & Schraenen engages visual culture and modes of perception, drawing from earlier modernist traditions such as Abstract art, Minimalism and Opt Art within highly controlled site-specific installations that continuously stimulate the sensory and cognitive capacities of the viewer.

Arocha & Schraenen's work finds itself between the realm of abstraction and figuration. By altering pure abstract language, the artists introduce figurative elements and representational forms that disrupt traditional lineages and consequently open up new paths of formal and conceptual enquiry.

Arocha & Schraenen are known to make use of reflective surfaces such as mirror and plexiglass In applying mirrored surfaces in such an unusual fashion – i.e. everyday objects and geometric forms – the pieces fracture the space and invalidate the once stable set of parameters that defined it. Reflecting surfaces spill out the space in which the pieces are places but also affect the viewer whose image is pulled apart.

== Exhibitions (selection) ==
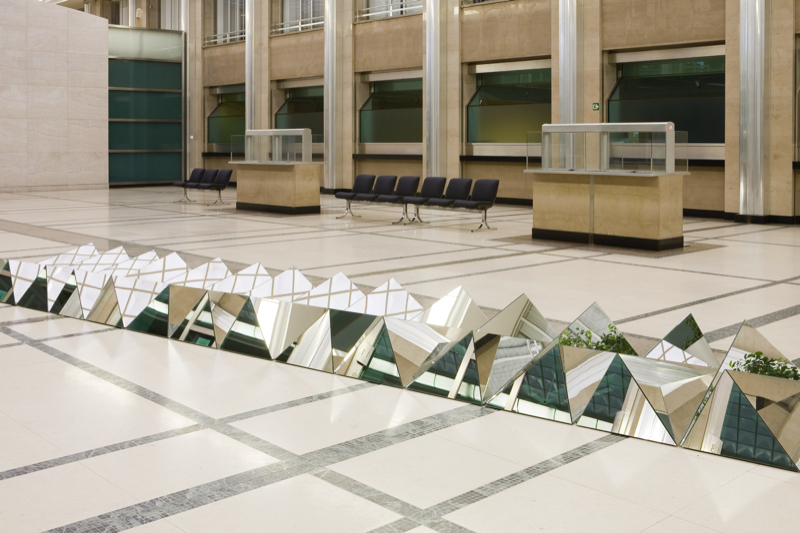
Circa Tabac, 2007, Carla Arocha and Stéphane Schraenen. Installation view, Brussels Biennial, National Bank of Belgium, Brussels, 2008, Carla Arocha and Stéphane Schraenen

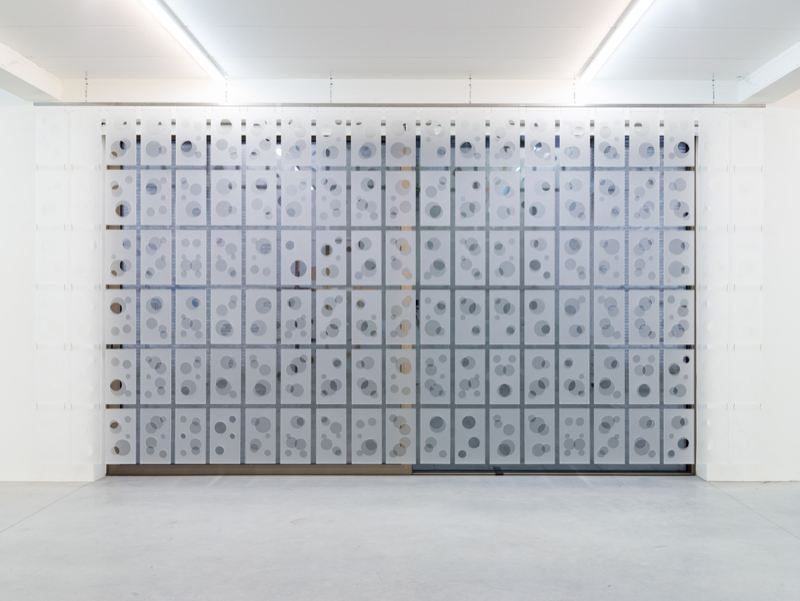
Blind, 2007, Carla Arocha and Stéphane Schraenen.

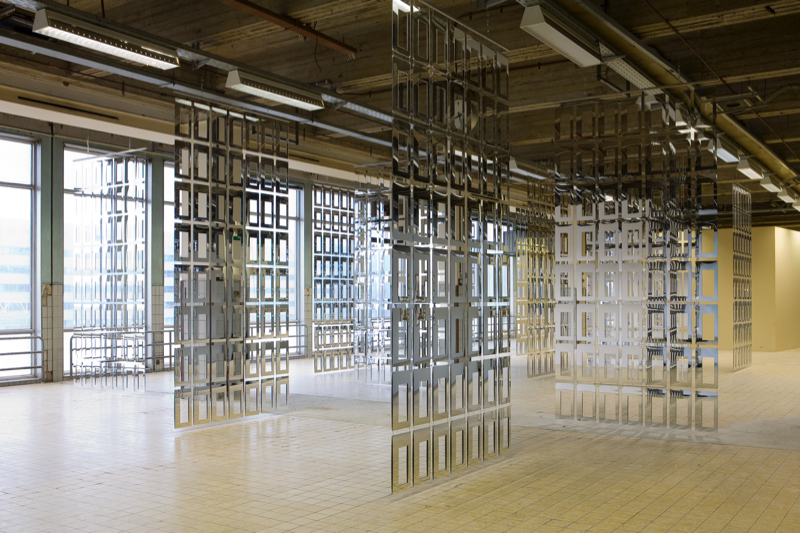
P5bis, 2007, Carla Arocha and Stéphane Schraenen.

Arocha and Schraenen had their first solo exhibition in 2007 at the Monique Meloche Gallery in Chicago. After participating in the exhibitions such as Reflecting Another Space at The Agency Gallery in London, exhibition curated by Ken Pratt, and their solo exhibition Hier Waak ik at Centro de Arte Los Galpones in Caracas, exhibition curated by Jesus Fuenmayor, they became regulars on the international art scene. In 2008 were included in the Brussels Biennial curated by Barbara Vanderlinden, and in 2009 in The State of Things, and exhibition curated by Ai Wei Wei and Luc Tuymans in the BOZAR Centre for Fine Arts, Brussels, and XIV Bienal de Cuenca, Cuenca, Ecuador, Estructuras vivientes. El arte como experiencia plural, curated by Jesús Fuenmayor in 2019.

=== Solo exhibitions by Arocha and Schraenen (selection) ===
- Marauders, Monique Meloche Gallery, Chicago, 2007
- The Man You Love to Hate, Koraalberg, Antwerp, 2008
- Pablo Sigg, Arocha and Schraenen. Fire Walk With Me, PETRA, Mexico City, 2007–08; travelled to Koraalberg, Antwerp
- Hier Waak Ik, Periférico Caracas | Arte Contemporáneo, Caracas, 2009
- Gloria, Vegas Gallery, London, 2009
- Sequence #4, Koraalberg, Antwerp, 2010
- Undertow, KaBe Contemporary, Miami, 2010
- As If, Monique Meloche Gallery, Chicago, 2010
- Circa Tabac The Wallace Collection, The Wallace Collection, London, 2011
- After, Centro de Arte Contemporáneo de Caja de Burgos (CAB), Burgos, 2012
- The Discrepancy Between the Pale and the Dark Zone, Ganes Pratt, MALA Gallery, Ljubljana, 2012
- Caraota von Moules, Künstlerhaus Bethanien, Berlin, 2012
- Sunday, Wako Works of Art, Tokyo, 2013
- What Now?, Galerie Isabella Czarnowska, Berlin, 2013
- Looking For Clues, ltd los angeles, Los Angeles, 2013
- Click, KaBe Contemporary, Miami, 2013
- Persiana, Cultuurcentrum Mechelen, Mechelen, 2014
- In A Rhythmic Fashion, The Croatian Academy of Arts Glypthotheque, Zagreb, 2015
- Trace, Galerie Isabella Czarnowska, Berlin, 2015
- Concrete, Parasol Unit Foundation for Contemporary Art, London, 2016
- Carla Arocha and Stéphane Schraenen and Markos Dobeli: Restlessness, Galerie Isabella Czarnowska, Berlin, 2017
- Marauding in Molenbeek, and Nicolas Kozakis: Ferrari Rosso Berlinetta Pert 266154, Kusseneers Gallery, Brussels, 2017
- Tickle, The Suburban, Milwaukee, Riverwest, 2018
- C2H6O, Pulsar, Antwerp, 2018
- Walk the Line, Galería Maior, Palma de Mallorca, 2018
- The Aftermath, Gallery of Fine Arts, Split, 2019
- Look Out, Galería Maior, Pollença, 2019

=== Solo exhibitions by Carla Arocha (selection) ===
- Portrait: A Site-Specific Installation by Carla Preiss, El Museo del Barrio, New York, 1996
- Carla Preiss: New Work, Rhona Hoffman Gallery, Chicago, 1996–1997
- Gate, Hermetic Gallery, Milwaukee, 1997
- Hide & Rover, Museum of Contemporary Art, Chicago 1997
- Somewhere, Cranbrook Art Museum, Bloomfield Hills, 1998
- Hover: New Work, Kavi Gupta Gallery (formerly Vedanta Gallery), Chicago, 1999
- Zipper, Dorothée De Pauw Gallery, Brussels, 2000
- Underground, Monique Meloche Gallery, Chicago, 2001
- Rover, Objectif Exhibitions, Antwerp, 2002
- By chance, Monique Meloche Gallery, Chicago, 2003
- Smoke, Galería OMR, Mexico City, 2004
- Dirt, Kunsthalle Bern, Bern, 2006
- Carla Arocha (in collaboration with Stéphane Schraenen), Koraalberg, Antwerp, 2006
- Chris (in collaboration with Stéphane Schraenen), Fonds régional d'art contemporain Auvergne, Clermont-Ferrand, 2006

== Personal lives and other activities ==
Carla Arocha met the Belgian painter Luc Tuymans in 1995 while he was preparing for his first exhibition in the United States at The Renaissance Society in Chicago. Four years later, in 1999, she moved to Belgium and married Tuymans. The couple currently resides and works in Antwerp.

Schraenen is the son of Guy Schraenen and Anne Marsily, founders of the publishing house Guy Schraenen éditeur and the Archive for Small Press & Communication (A.S.P.C. or ASPC), and the Galerie Kontakt, which Guy Schraenen ran from 1965 to 1978. In 1992 he started modeling for Belgium fashion designers, many of which had previously studied at the Royal Academy of Fine Arts (Antwerp). From 1996 to 2006 he worked as assistant director, scenographer, production designer, graphic designer, and production manager on various exhibition, video and music projects, for example, the production coordination of the exhibition Joëlle Teurlinckx's exhibition at the Bonnefantenmuseum in Maastricht, the exhibition scenography of the Dakar Biennale, 5ème Biennale de l’Art Africain, and exhibition coordination of the exhibition Monopolis/Antwerpen at the Witte de With Center for Contemporary Art in Rotterdam.

The artist-run non-profit art space CASSTL in Antwerp was co-founded in 2017 by Arocha, Schraenen, and Luc Tuymans.

== Public collections ==
The individual and collective work of Carla Arocha and Stéphane Schraenen can be found in the collections of the following institutions:

- Museum of Modern Art, New York, NY, U.S. (Arocha)
- Museum of Contemporary Art (Chicago), IL, U.S. (Arocha)
- Museum van Hedendaagse Kunst Antwerpen (M HKA), Antwerp, Belgium
- Art Institute of Chicago, Chicago, IL, U.S. (Arocha)
- Walker Art Center, Minneapolis, MN, U.S.
- Fonds régional d’art contemporain Auvergne, Clermont-Ferrand, France
- Fonds régional d’art contemporain Bourgogne, Dijon, France (Arocha)
- Stiftung Kunsthalle Bern, Bern, Switzerland (Arocha)
- Boca Raton Museum of Art, Boca Raton, FL, U.S.
- Centro de Arte Contemporáneo de Caja de Burgos (CAB), Burgos, Spain
- Benedictine University Art Collection, Chicago, IL, U.S.
- Cisneros Fontanals Art Foundation, Miami, FL, U.S.
- Fundación Banco Mercantil, Caracas, Venezuela
- Anglo Irish Bank, Chicago, IL, U.S.
- The Cisneros Fontanals Art Foundation, Miami, FL, U.S.
- Chicago Transit Authority (CTA), Chicago, IL, U.S.
- National Bank of Belgium, Brussels, Belgium
