= Luc Tuymans =

Belgian painter

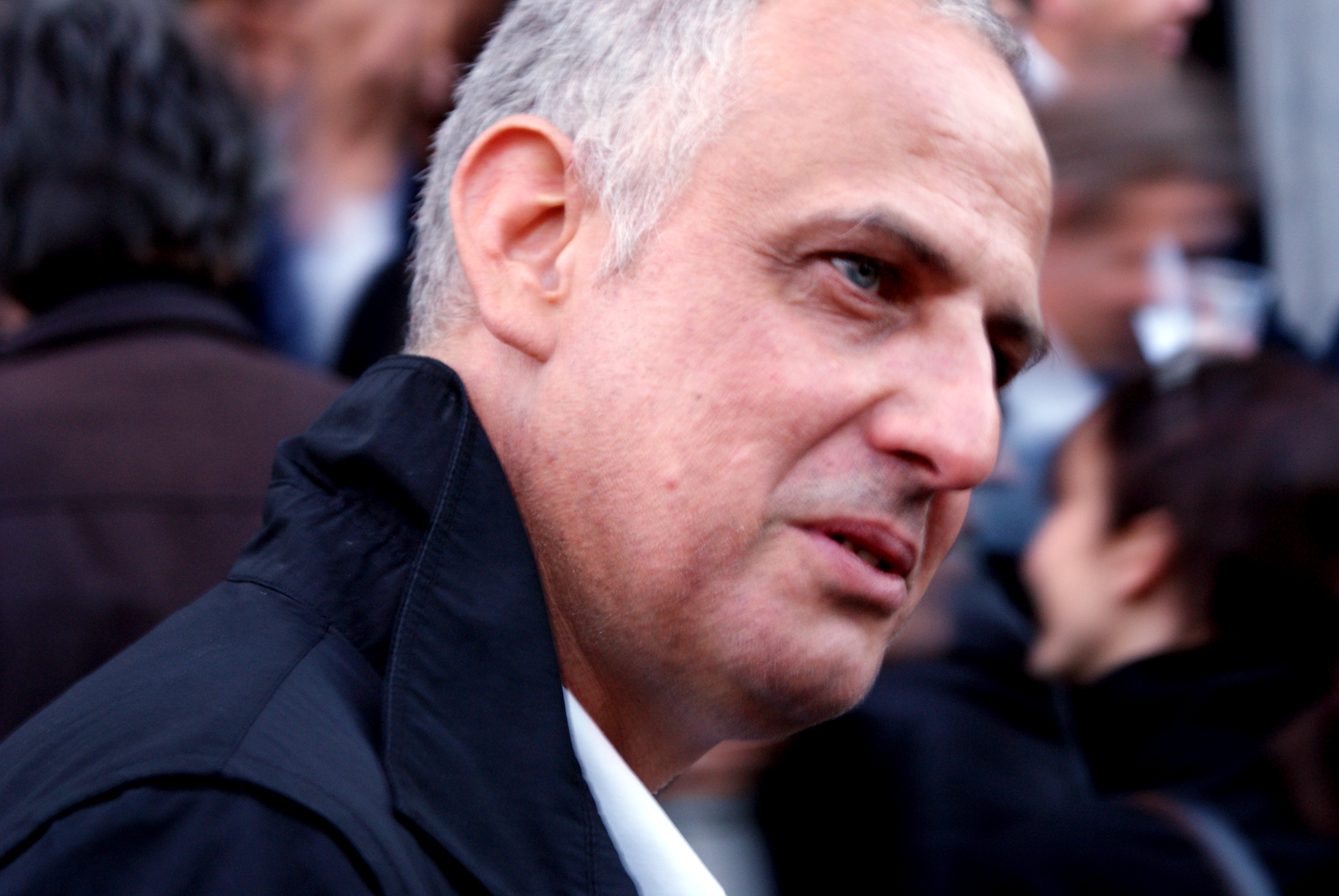
- Tuymans in 2009
- Born: 14 June 1958 (age 68); Mortsel, Belgium
- Education: Sint-Lukasinstituut Brussels; École nationale supérieure des Arts visuels de La Cambre, Brussels; Royal Academy of Fine Arts Antwerp; Free University of Brussels
- Known for: Painting
- Spouse: Carla Arocha (after 1999)
- Awards: Orders: Order of Leopold (Commander); ICOCEP-International Congress on Contemporary European Painting (Medal of Honour); Academies for Excellence: American Academy of Arts and Letters (Honorary Member); Member of the Akademie der Künste in Berlin; Academic Honours: University of Antwerp (Dr.h.c.); University of Arts Poznań (Dr.h.c.); Royal College of Art (Dr.h.c.); Awards: The Vincent Award (Finalist); Coutts Contemporary Art Foundation Awards; Flemish Culture Award for Visual Arts; ULTIMA Award; AmfAR, The Foundation for AIDS Research Awards; Prizes: Cultuurprijs K.U. Leuven, Prijs Blanlin-Evrart
- Website: Official website Zeno X Gallery; David Zwirner Gallery

Luc Tuymans (born 14 June 1958) is a Belgian visual artist best known for his paintings which explore people's relationship with history and confront their ability to ignore it. World War II is a recurring theme in his work. He is a key figure of the generation of European figurative painters who gained renown at a time when many believed the medium had lost its relevance due to the new digital age.

Much of Tuymans' work deals with moral complexity, specifically the coexistence of 'good' and 'evil'. His subjects range from major historical events such as the Holocaust to the seemingly inconsequential or banal: wallpaper, Christmas decorations or everyday objects for example.

The artist's sparsely-coloured figurative paintings are made up of quick brush strokes of wet paint. Tuymans paints from photographic or cinematic images drawn from the media or public sphere, as well as from his own photographs and drawings. They often appear intentionally out of focus. The blurred effect is, however, created purposefully with painted strokes, it is not the result of a 'wiping away' technique.

Formal and conceptual oppositions recur in his work, which is echoed in his remark that while 'sickness should appear in the way the painting is made' there is also pleasure in its making – a 'caressing' of the canvas. This reflects Tuymans' semantic shaping of the philosophical content of his work. Often allegorical, his titles add a further layer of imagery to his work – a layer that exists beyond the visible. The painting Gaskamer (Gas Chamber) exemplifies his use of titles to provoke associations in the mind of the viewer. Meaning, in his work, is never fixed; his paintings incite thought. A related characteristic of Tuymans' work is the way he often works in series, a method which enables one image to generate another through which images can be formulated and reformulated ad infinitum. Images are repeatedly analysed and distilled, and a large number of drawings, photocopies and watercolours are produced in preparation for his oil paintings. Each final painting is, however, completed in a single day.

== Early life ==
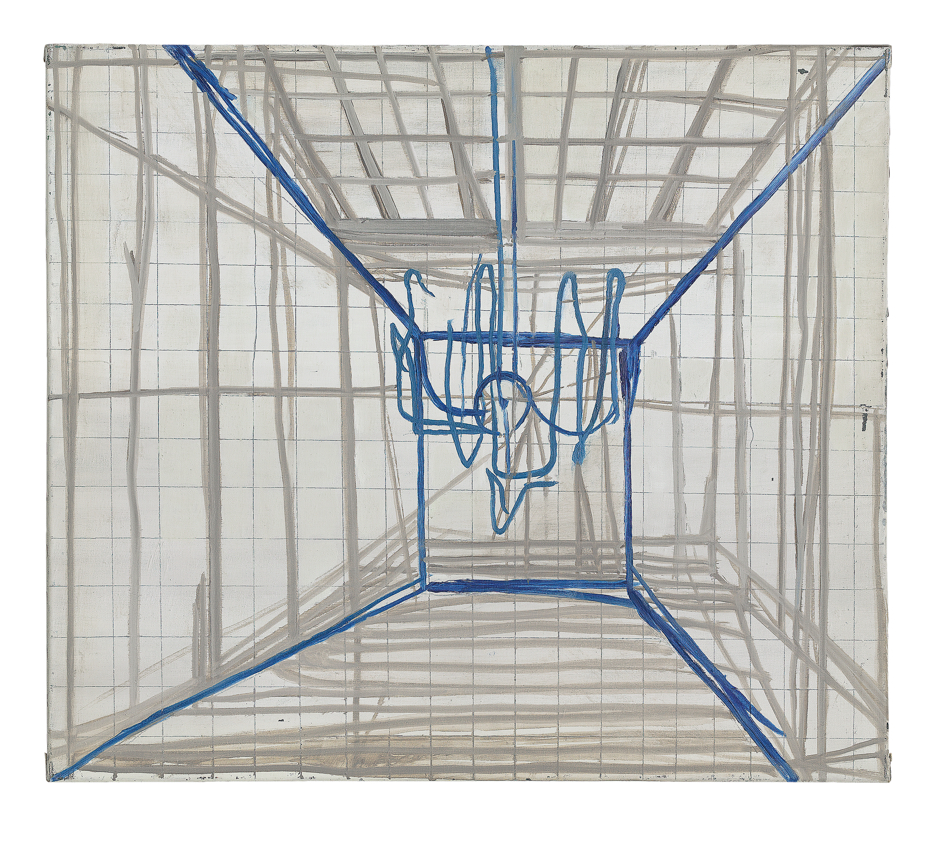
Luc Tuymans, Antichambre, 1985 Oil on canvas, 69.9 × 80.1 cm, 271/2 × 319/16 inches, Collection M HKA Museum of Contemporary Art, Antwerp – Collection of the Flemish Community

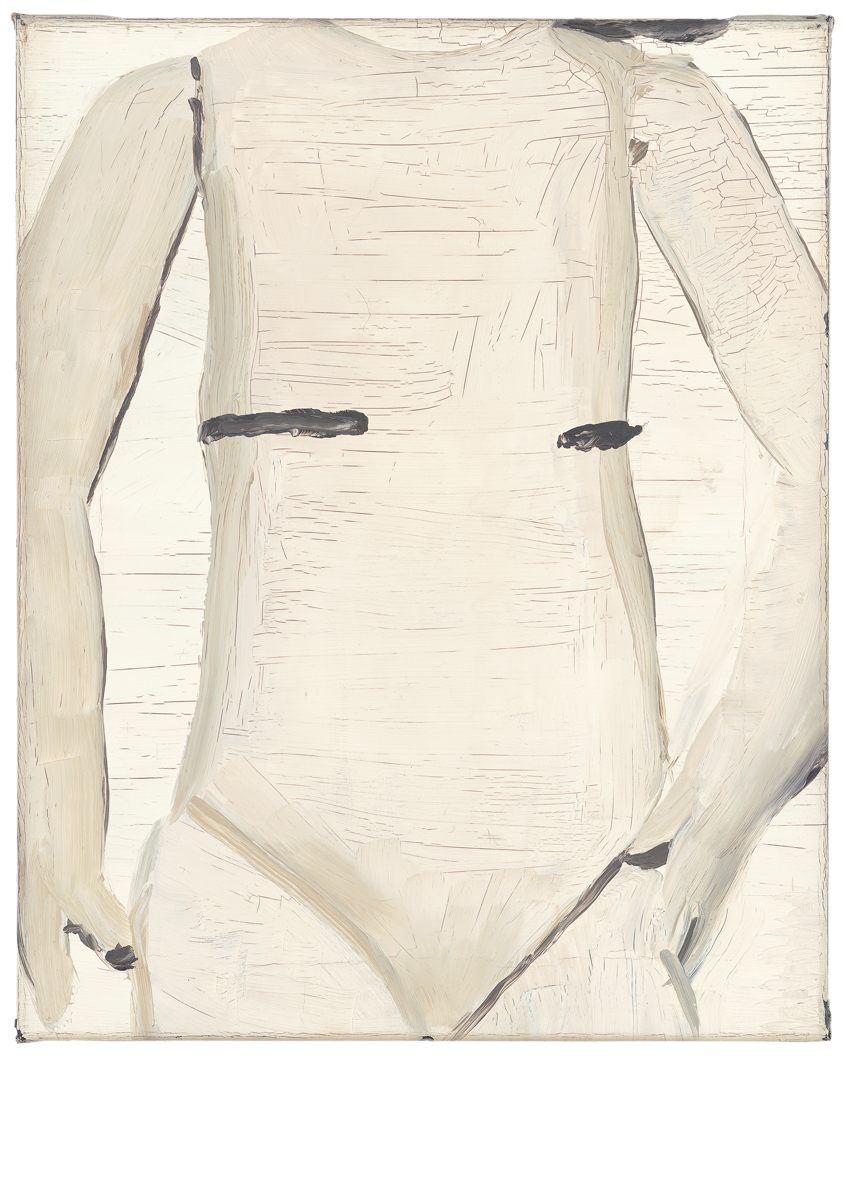
Luc Tuymans, Body, 1990 Oil on canvas, 48.5 × 38.5 cm, 19 1/8 × 15 1/4 inches, Collection S.M.A.K. Stedelijk Museum voor Actuele Kunst, Ghent

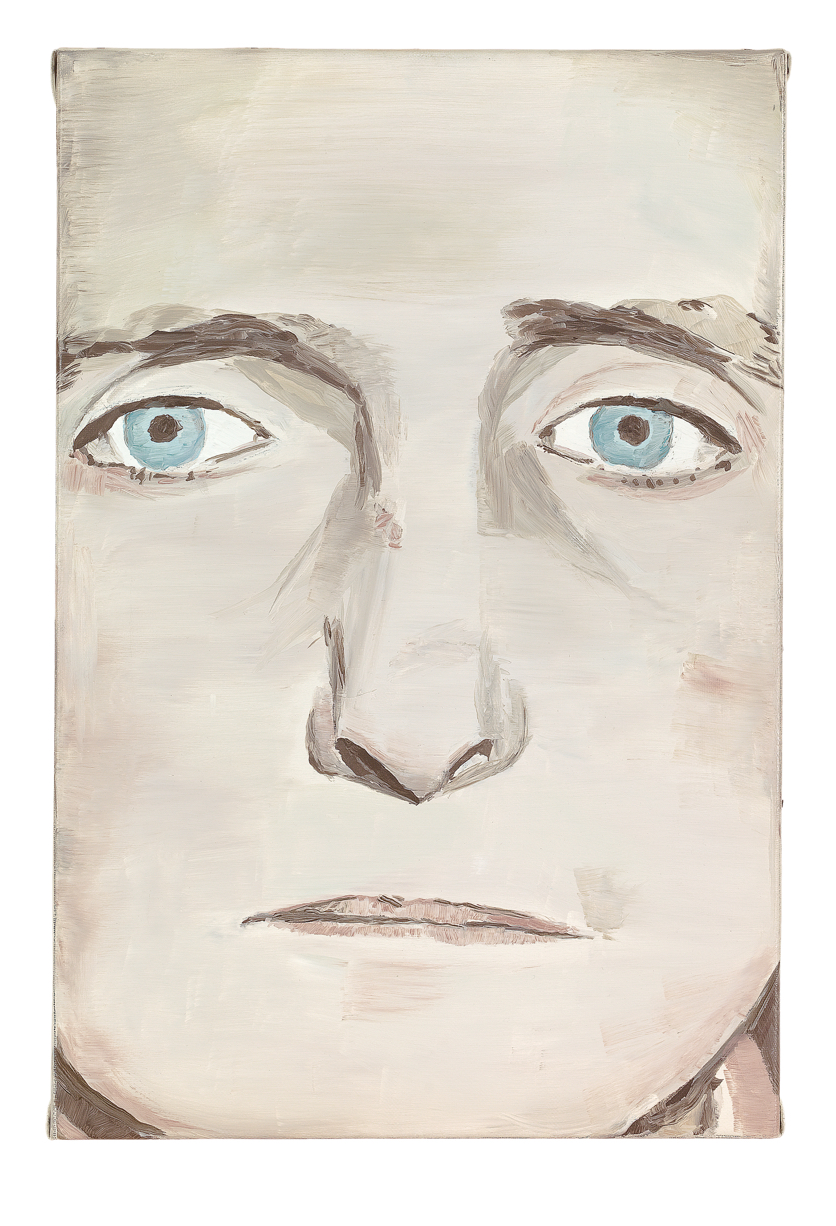
Luc Tuymans, Der diagnostische Blick IV, 1992. Oil on canvas, 57 × 38.2 cm, 22 1/2 × 15 1/8 inches, Private collection, on long-term loan to De Pont Museum of Contemporary Art, Tilburg

Luc Tuymans was born in Mortsel close to the city of Antwerp on 14 June 1958. His father was Belgian Flemish and his mother was Dutch. During World War II his mother's family joined the Dutch Resistance and hid refugees, whereas some members of his father's family allegedly had sympathised with Nazi ideology. This fact echoed through family conversations, raising moral questions and feelings of guilt, and the subject became a source of fascination and fear, later playing a key role in Tuymans' painting.

His interest in art manifested itself at a young age, and his ability was first recognised during a summer holiday in Zundert, when he won a drawing competition. He later said this event gave him a sense of the path he had to take. When he was eight or nine, his uncle took him to the Kunstmuseum in The Hague where he saw a painting by Mondrian. In a much later conversation, he explained how 'looking at that abstract painting was my first art experience.... I felt the magic of art in it.... I did understand the monumentality of that work.'

== Education ==
Tuymans' formal art studies began at the age of 18 at the Sint-Lukasinstituut in Brussels (1976–79). During this period he traveled to Budapest where he saw El Greco's paintings at the Museum of Fine Arts. In an interview in 2020, Tuymans described seeing these paintings as a shock, and discussed the fascination El Greco still holds for him today. He continued his studies at the National School of Visual Arts of La Cambre in Brussels (1979–80), before going to the Royal Academy of Fine Arts in Antwerp (1980–82), where he gave up painting for filmmaking. Having completed his fine art studies, Tuymans enrolled for an academic degree in Art history at the Free University of Brussels (1982–86).

== Work (paintings) ==
=== Early work, 1972–94 ===
During the crucial first phase of Tuymans' artistic development, his painting method evolved rapidly, and his first solo and group exhibitions took place. According to the catalogue raisonné, he created nearly 200 paintings on canvas or hardboard during this period. His first known painting dates from 1972 and the first public exhibited painting was created in 1977, entitled Self-Portrait. He was a student at the time, and submitted it to the national painting competition in Belgium, which he won.

From 1979 to 1980, Tuymans worked in collaboration with Marc Schepers on two local projects entitled Morguen. The artists asked families from a neighbourhood in Antwerp for historical family photographs, a collection they built on with their own documentation of the area. The following year, they published the project in the Tijdschrift voor levende Volkskunst (Journal of Living Folk Art), as a journal modelled on the historical Volksfoto magazine. Six months later they organized a second photo project. This time, they focused on the workers' district surrounding St. Andrew's Church, Antwerp.

Between 1980 and 1985, Tuymans stopped painting, dedicating himself to experimentation with film. Among other film-projects, he created Feu d’artifice (Firework) and made plans for an unrealized, semi-documentary feature film. Some of the film fragments he made later served as inspiration for paintings. When Tuymans resumed painting in 1985, he changed his technique, and since then he never spent more than a day working on a painting.

From 1978 on, Tuymans' paintings centred on European memories of World War II, confronting Adorno's famous question whether art was impossible following the holocaust, and 'the collapse of any coherent tradition in painting' described by Peter Schjeldahl. One of his works from this period is a small painting of the gas chamber in Dachau, entitled Gaskamer (Gas Chamber), 1986. This painting was based on a watercolour he had done on site. As J.S. Marcus from The Wall Street Journal wrote, the painting 'simplified the means of painting.... flattened the perspective, muted the colour and the direction of the composition.... To save the painting he almost makes it disappear.' Other paintings that date from this period are the 1988 four-part painting Die Zeit (The Time) in which Tuymans combines a portrait of the Nazi frontman Reinhard Heydrich with two spinach tablets and a cityscape, and the 1989 painting Die Wiedergutmachung (The Reparation) that depicts the eyes of gypsy children who had been experimented on by the Nazis.

From the late 1970s, Tuymans also began to paint portraits of himself and imaginary portraits, anonymous individuals, and historical and public figures. Superficially, most of these images seem to be traditional portraits; the approach is dispassionate and not psychological. His portraits strip individuality away, leaving the body resembling a shell, the face a mask. Another example of his figurative portrait work is Der diagnostische Blick (The Diagnostic Look), a series of ten paintings from 1992 based on clinical images of bodies and body parts he found in a physician's manual on physical diseases.

As Meyer-Hermann wrote in the catalogue raisonné, the artist first elucidated his theoretical approach in an unrealized proposal for a group exhibition, entitled Virus of the Vanities. Here, he defines key terms and develops a dialectic between the 'virus' as representative of the 'cult', and 'vanity' as a projection of 'culture', also opposing the 'anecdotal' (as in the portrait or still life) to the 'symbolic' (as in representations of time or death). Tuymans refers to nine of his paintings dating from 1978 to 1990 to support his ideas.

Tuymans' first exhibition in North America, entitled Superstition, was held in 1994 at the David Zwirner Gallery (it was also shown later at the Art Gallery of York University in Toronto, The Renaissance Society at the University of Chicago, and London's ICA Institute of Contemporary Arts). The exhibition reflected humankind's scepticism and spiritual indifference as manifested by our attitude to recent historical events.

=== 1995–2006 ===
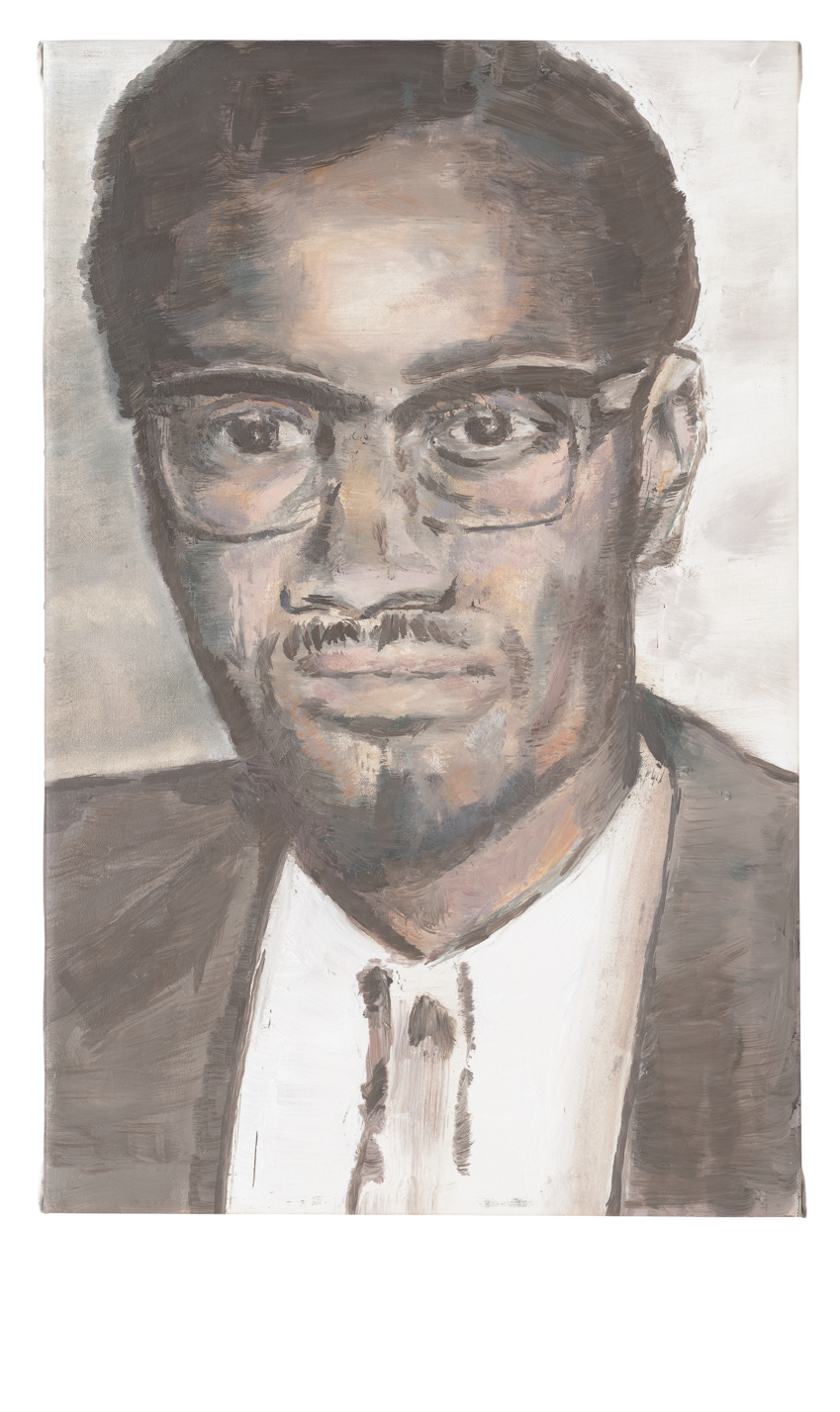
Luc Tuymans, Lumumba, 2000, oil on canvas, 62 × 46 cm, 24 3/8 × 18 1/8 inches, Collection The Museum of Modern Art, New York

Since 1995 Tuymans' international renown grew, and he participated in over 140 group exhibitions and had 47 solo shows in Europe, North America, and Asia. Between these dates, he created 198 works he classified as paintings, several murals and textile wall hangings.

His exhibition Heimat, held in 1995 at the Zeno X Gallery in Antwerp and the Musée des Beaux Arts in Nantes, was a response to political events in Flanders and targeted Flemish nationalism. Pieces shown were all dated from that year and included The Flag, A Flemish Village, the Flemish memorial Ijzertoren (Yser Tower), a portrait of the Flemish writer Ernest Claes entitled A Flemish Intellectual, and Home Sweet Home. Several of the paintings included in Heimat were shown the following year (1996–97) in the exhibition Face à l‘histoire held at the Centre Georges Pompidou in Paris, which looked at modern artists' responses to major historical and political events over the preceding sixty years. In a later 2014 interview discussing the Heimat series with De Witte Raaf he expressed his particular dislike of the separatist, far-right Flemish political party the Vlaams Blok (Flemish block), which achieved its best electoral result to date in Antwerp in 1994, stating: 'I was ashamed that I was from Antwerp!’

In 1996, Tuymans' exhibition Heritage, held at the David Zwirner Gallery, consisted of ten new paintings of the same title, all inspired by the mood that prevailed in the U.S. following the Oklahoma City bombing. The series depicts normal, almost stereotypical American imagery: a painting of two baseball caps (Heritage I); Mount Rushmore (Heritage VII); a man working (Heritage VIII); a portrait and a birthday cake (Heritage IX). The series also includes a portrait of the wealthy Ku Klux Klan member Joseph Milteer (Heritage VI).

In 2000, Tuymans attracted attention with his series of political paintings Mwana Kitoko (Beautiful Boy), inspired by King Baudouin of Belgium's state visit to the Congo in the 1950s. These works were exhibited in 2000 at the David Zwirner Gallery and the following year in the Belgian Pavilion at the Venice Biennale.

At Documenta 11 in 2002, which focused on works of art containing political or social commentary, many expected Tuymans to present new work created in response to the 9/11 attacks on New York. Instead, he presented a simple still-life executed on a massive scale, deliberately ignoring all reference to world events. This inevitably led to some negative criticism. Tuymans however, described his decision as a deliberate strategy of 'sublimation': 'In Still-Life the idea of banality becomes larger than life, it is taken to an impossible extreme. It's actually just an icon, an almost purely cerebral painting, more like a light projection. The attacks [9/11] were also an assault on aesthetics. That gave me the idea of reacting with a sort of anti-picture, with an idyll, albeit an inherently twisted one.'

In 2004 Tate Modern in London and in 2006 Museu Serralves in Porto devoted major solo exhibitions to Tuymans work.

=== From 2007 onwards ===
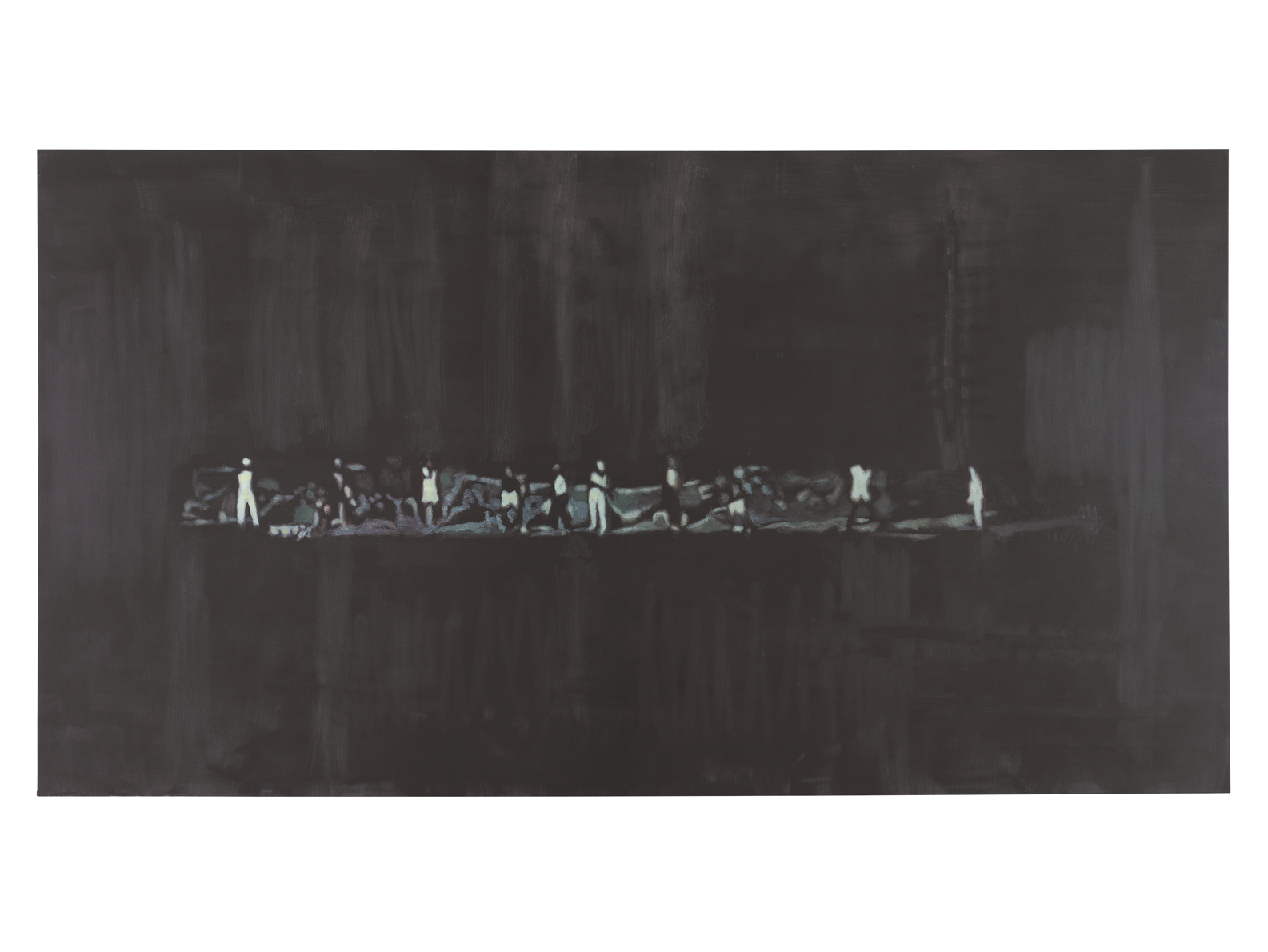
Luc Tuymans, The Shore, 2014 Oil on canvas, 194.2 × 353.7 cm, 761/2 × 1391/4 inches, Collection Tate Modern, London. Presented by the artist and David Zwirner, 2016

Since 2007, Tuymans participated in over 200 group exhibitions and had over 30 solo shows in Europe, North America, and Asia. During this period (2007–19) he produced 180 works he classified as paintings, plus several murals and textile wall hangings.

His 2007 exhibition Les Revenants at Zeno X focused on the social influence of the Jesuits in education. In 2007, a major retrospective was organized by the Műcsarnok Kunsthalle in Budapest (2007–2008) which travelled as Luc Tuymans: Wenn der Frühling kommt to Haus der Kunst in Munich in 2008 and as Come and See to the Zachęta National Gallery of Art in Warsaw. Each venue had a different set of paintings on show. His 2008 solo show at David Zwirner Gallery, entitled The Management of Magic, explored the 'Disney-fication' of consumer society. From 2009 to 2011, this major exhibition travelled to four cities in North America: the Wexner Center for the Arts, the SFMOMA San Francisco Museum of Modern Art, DMA Dallas Museum of Art, and the MCA Museum of Contemporary Art in Chicago. It then moved to its final stop in Belgium at BOZAR – Palais des Beaux-Arts in Brussels.

Between 2006 and 2008, solo exhibitions devoted to Tuymans were held in diverse locations: at Műcsarnok Kunsthalle in Budapest in 2007–08; at Zachęta National Gallery of Art in Warsaw and at Haus der Kunst in Munich in 2008.

In 2012, Tuymans was invited by the Polish artist Mirosław Bałka to take part in a project in the town where Bałka had grown up: Otwock. This project involved interpreting the town's history through artworks which were spread across over twenty locations. Tuymans contributed the painting Die Nacht (2012), which refers to Hans-Jürgen Syberberg's epic 1985 film installation on German history. During the second season in 2012, this painting hung in Bałka's childhood bedroom. Tuymans also installed hundreds of black balloons in the ruins of Zofiówka, a former hospital for people with mental health conditions. In 1940, the building was part of the Otwock ghetto, and in 1942, during the Nazi occupation of Poland, its inhabitants either died of starvation, were shot, or were sent to the Treblinka concentration camp.

At the retrospective exhibition entitled Intolerance staged by QM Gallery Al Riwaq in Doha in 2016, Tuymans presented a new body of work entitled The Arena I–VI. These works depict violence in 1942. 'With visual similarities to Francisco Goya's The Third of May 1808, 1814, Tuymans' strong highlighting of central figures encased by a blackened, scruffy vignette suggests a diaspora, revolution, or an uneasy static mob. There is a sense of pent-up aggression that lies beneath the surface of the ethnically ambiguous and androgynous forms.'

Copyright infringement

In January 2015 Tuymans was found guilty of plagiarism by a Belgian civil court after he used a photograph taken by Katrijn Van Giel as the source of his painting A Belgian Politician (2011), a portrait of Jean-Marie Dedecker. Tuymans appealed against the ruling, claiming that the painting was a parody – a critique of Belgian conservatism. He and Van Giel reached an amicable, confidential out-of-court settlement in October 2015. The British newspaper The Guardian supported the artist in this dispute, commenting on the way Tuymans never makes photorealistic representations of original photos, and describing how 'his work bears witness to a career-long survey of all images.

== Other works ==
=== Works on paper ===
Drawing has been integral to Tuymans' artistic practice from the start. Sketches, watercolours and other small-scale works form the bedrock of his work for they constitute, for him, a way of thinking through an idea. Important features of Tuymans' artistic approach can be found in these preparatory pieces such as his voluntary choice of low-quality materials and his incorporation of found elements. Such works are both visual preparations for later paintings and exteriorisations of thought processes. As Tuymans said in an interview with Josef Helfenstein in 1997: 'drawing is particularly important because I become mentally involved in the work and the picture. What is important for me is the idea of thinking while I draw, particularly in the tiny drawings. It helps to have everything under control'. Elsewhere in the interview, Tuymans explained that he mostly draws from memory and that he finds it better not to start drawing immediately when he sees something, but that he draws 'on the basis of a fragmentary memory.' This is elaborated on later in the 1997 interview with Helfenstein, when he describes how he usually prefers to draw after seeing something, 'on the basis of a fragmentary memory'. Each drawing is more than a visual record: it forms part of a wider reflective process. The first comprehensive exhibition of Tuymans' drawings and other works on paper from the years 1975–96 was on view in an exhibition that travelled to Kunsthalle Bern, Bern; Berkeley Art Museum, Berkeley; and Capc Musée d'art contemporain, Bordeaux (in 1997–98).

=== Murals ===
Luc Tuymans talks about his triptych mural St. Croce, 2010, MCA Museum of Contemporary Art in Chicago.

Tuymans has made about 50 site-specific murals since the mid-1990s, five permanent and the rest temporary. Unlike the permanent mural paintings, Tuymans other mural paintings are temporary events and installations created for exhibitions. The type of mural techniques used is either acrylic paint or fresco applied directly on the existing wall surfaces. On rare occasions, he also made textile murals, which are based on drawings that are scanned and mechanically produced. As he said in a video interview he gave about the triptych mural painting S. Croce (2010), they are always related to the 'raw space' and 'it is the element of approach which is important with murals', he also mentioned that 'If I work on a wall I feel much more free than on a canvas.'

The first permanent mural was created in 1995 in Antwerp at Café Alberto. It features a larger version of the painting Superstition. In 2007 Tuymans executed a permanent mural based on Bloodstains (1993) on the ceiling of the ballroom of the former Ringtheater. This same year, the building was taken over by Troubleyn/Laboratorium, the performance company run by the Belgian playwright and artist Jan Fabre. In February 2012, Tuymans used the motif of Angel for a permanent mural created in the second balcony foyer of the Concertgebouw Brugge. Tuymans gave the Staatsschauspiel Dresden two permanent murals created for the main staircases of the building on Theaterstrasse in 2013. These two murals are based on the paintings Peaches (2012) and Technicolor (2012).Arena (2017) is the most recent permanent mural created for the Museum of Fine Arts in Ghent. This work is a fresco mural that consists of three panels located at the end of a curved gallery in the museum's hall.

=== Mosaics ===
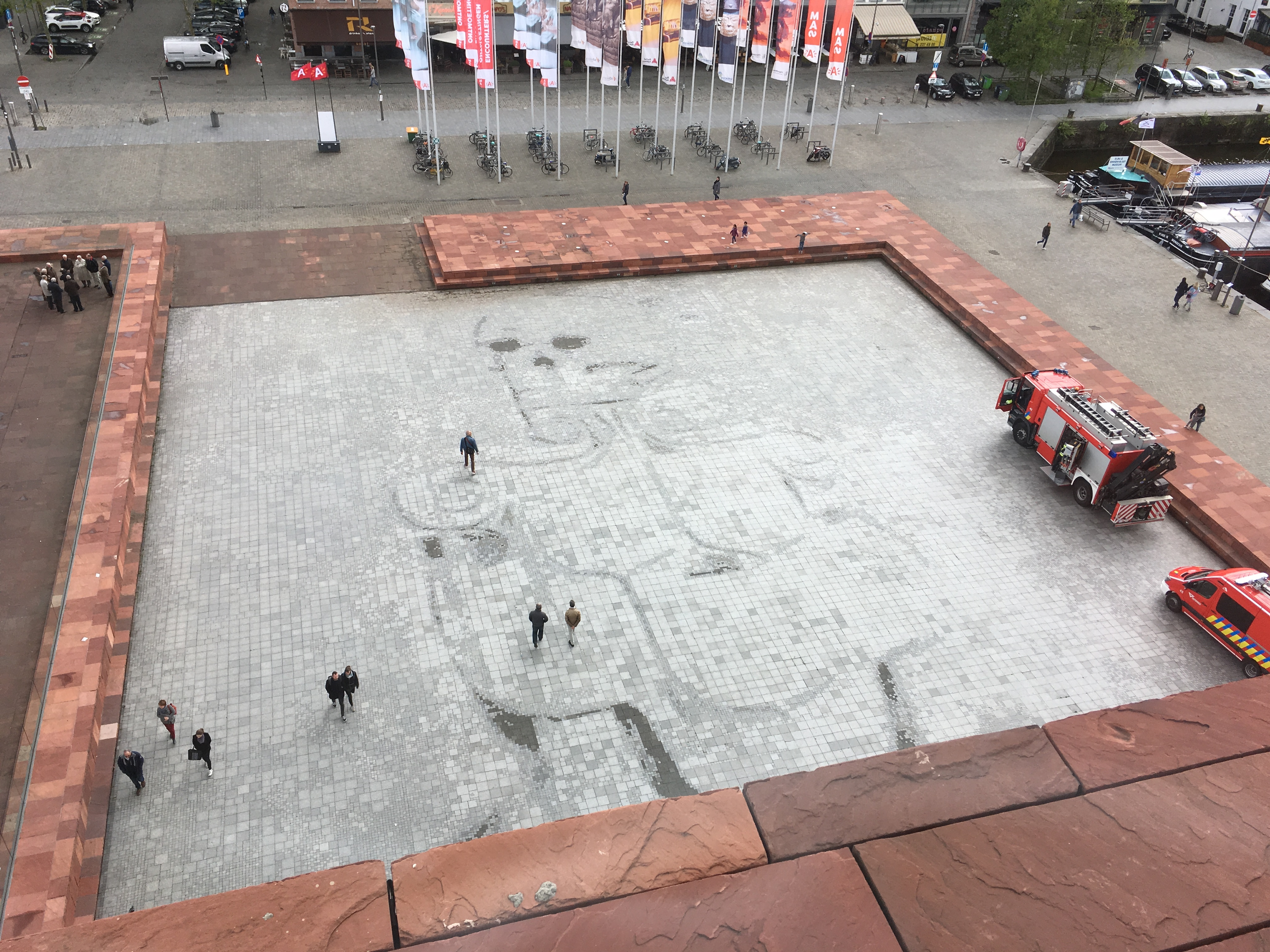
Luc Tuymans, Dead Skull, 2010 MAS Museum aan de Stroom, Antwerp

The first mosaic Tuymans made was Dead Skull, 2010, commissioned by the MAS Museum aan de Stroom (Museum by the River) as a permanent installation in the museum square on the Hanzestedenplaats in Antwerp. It is a 40 m^{2} stone mosaic that evokes Tuymans' painting of the same name created in 2002, which in turn refers to a memorial plaque dedicated to the 16th-century painter Quinten Metsys from Antwerp which can be found on the facade of the Cathedral of Our Lady in Antwerp. The painting was first transformed into a grid pattern of 488 by 488 pixels. Using that image and a specially designed digital conversion technique, a mosaic was created from 96,569 stones of 11 different colours. The installation began in the winter of 2009 and was finished in the summer of 2010. Dead Skull is hardly distinguishable as an image when you are on the ground floor, but the higher you climb in the MAS, the more clearly the skull becomes visible.

The second mosaic Tuymans made was Schwarzheide, made at the time of his exhibition La Pelle at Palazzo Grassi in 2019. This work was produced by Fantini Mosaici in Milan and is based on Tuymans' eponymous oil on canvas dated 1989 representing a German forced-labour camp. The full image could only be seen from the balustrades, overlooking the atrium of Palazzo Grassi. Due to the floods that hit Venice in February 2020, the site-specific mosaic was dismantled.

=== Graphic works ===
Tuymans experimented with printmaking from the late 1980s on, producing a graphic oeuvre of about 90 works, which focus – like his paintings – on the mediation and translation of images in the mass media. He has explored various printing methods such as photocopy, inkjet, offset, monotype, screen-printing, lithography, etching, and silver gelatine prints, using unusual supports such as wallpaper, security glass and PVC. In a similar way to his paintings, his printed images often appear blurred or reduced. They are frequently based on photographs or film stills, which the artist photographs and re-photographs until much of the original detail is lost. The four-colour etching Isabel, Diorama, Scramble, Twenty Seventeen (2017) for example, is based on iPhone photographs Tuymans took while painting. These images reveal an early, unfinished stage of the work. The paint strokes Tuymans placed in the margin of the painting and at the edges of the canvas are also incorporated in the etched image.

Most of Tuymans' prints are made in collaboration with Antwerp-based master printer Roger Vandaele and Edition Copenhagen.

== Other activities ==
=== Curating ===
Tuymans is also a curator. The first exhibition he curated was Trouble Spot: Painting in 1999 at the Museum van Hedendaagse Kunst Antwerpen and the NICC – New International Centre in Antwerp. This show included works by about 50 artists, including Gerhard Richter, Ellsworth Kelly, Raoul De Keyser, Marlene Dumas, and Andy Warhol. In an interview with Artzip, he explained that the idea behind the exhibition was 'to explore the boundaries of painting' and that his curatorial approach was to 'prioritize the visual in order to create a dialogue between different works.' In 2002, he curated Kamers. een keuze van Luc Tuymans (Rooms. A choice by Luc Tuymans) at Ruimte Morguen in Antwerp. The following curated event took place on 5 October 2006, Tuymans organized Sirene/Alarm, an event that spanned numerous museums and cultural institutions in Belgium. All participating museums were asked to set their alarms to go off at 3 pm. Staff, artists, students, and other supporters evacuated the buildings involved for fifteen minutes. The event was a plea for tolerance; a statement against political extremism, racism, and violence.

In 2007 Tuymans curated the exhibition The Forbidden Empire: Visions of the World by Chinese and Flemish Artists at BOZAR – Centre for Fine Arts, Brussels. The exhibition was co-curated with Yu Hui and travelled to the Palace Museum in the Forbidden City in Beijing. The following exhibition he curated was Reconsidered. Luc Tuymans: Selected Works from the Städel Collection, an exhibition held at the Städel Museum in Frankfurt am Main in 2009. Following the Chinese/Flemish exhibition The Forbidden Empire, Tuymans curated in 2010, The State of Things: Brussels/Beijing, a cross-cultural exhibition that combined Belgian and Chinese art at BOZAR – Centre for Fine Arts, Brussels, which then travelled to the National Art Museum of China in Beijing.

In 2011, Angel Vergara invited Tuymans to curate the Angel Vergara: Feuilleton exhibition in the Belgian Pavilion at the 54th International Biennale di Venezia. In 2011, he also organized the exhibition A Vision of Central Europe for Brugge Centraal. As stated on Phaidon's website, Tuymans' starting point for this exhibition was the difference between the cities of Bruges and Warsaw: one survived World War II relatively unscathed, the other was decimated, then carefully reconstructed.

Two years later, he curated The Gap: Selected Abstract Art from Belgium at the London Parasol Unit Foundation for Contemporary Art, and in 2013, he collaborated with Dr Ulrich Bischoff on the exhibition Constable, Delacroix, Friedrich, Goya. A Shock to the Senses at the Albertinum in Dresden, an exhibition that traced the history of European painting from 1800 to the present, juxtaposing important works of European Romanticism with later modern and contemporary art. In 2016, he curated the exhibition 11 Artists Against the Wall, at Leopold Place 5 in Antwerp, as part of Born in Antwerp, and James Ensor by Luc Tuymans at the Royal Academy of Arts in London. The most recent exhibition Tuymans curated is Sanguine/Bloedrood. Luc Tuymans on Baroque, which opened in 2018 at the Museum of Contemporary Art, Antwerp then travelling to the Fondazione Prada in Milan.

== Teaching and artist talks ==
Tuymans has also engaged in pedagogical work, and was a guest tutor at the Dutch institute Rijksakademie van beeldende kunsten, where he mentored and influenced emerging painters such as the Polish artist Paulina Olowska, and the Serbian-born artist Ivan Grubanov. In 2008, Tuymans took on the Max Beckmann Foundation Professorship at the Städelschule, a role previously held by William Kentridge. During this time he participated in international symposia and conferences, and gave interviews and lectures on his work and painting in general at various international universities and museums.

In 1995, he gave a lecture on his work at the University of Chicago and participated in a conversation led by curator and writer Hamza Walker. In 2000, he participated with Carel Blotkamp, Ferdinand van Dieten, Benoît Hermans, Frank Reijnders, Jeroen Stumpel in the symposium The Persistence of Painting at the Rijksakademie van beeldende kunsten in Amsterdam. At the close of Tuymans' exhibition Signal at the Hamburger Bahnhof in 2001, a symposium entitled Gesichtsbilder was held involving the artist, Eugen Blume (director of Hamburger Bahnhof), the art historian Anne-Marie Bonnet, and Norbert Kampe (the director of House of the Wannsee Conference, Memorial and Educational Site). At Tuymans' request, the symposium's closing session took place at the House of the Wannsee Conference in Berlin, a former industrialist's villa used by the SSas a guest house and conference centre from 1941 to 1945 and the place the deportation and murder of European Jews was planned in 1942.

At the symposium Between Senses, Strukturen und Strategien del Malerei im 20. Jahrhundert organized for the exhibition Painting on the Move at the Beyeler Foundation in Basel, Tuymans participated in a panel discussion on the significance of painting in relation to new media, moderated by the art historian Beat Wyss, with the philosopher Hubert Damisch, the art historians Yve-Alain Bois, Bruno Haas, and Denys Zacharopoulos, and the artist and art historian Hans-Dieter Huber. In 2003, Tuymans held a public talk at the Kunstverein Hannover, and in 2004 he lectured at the Museo Tamayo, Mexico City (with Gerrit Vermeiren), at the Mauritshuis in The Hague where he gave a lecture entitled On Peter Paul Rubens, at the deSingel in Antwerp as part of the program Curating the Library, and at the Dresdner Bank in Berlin during the conference Europa eine Seele geben: Berliner Konferen für europaïsche Kulturpolitik. In 2006, he participated in an Artists Panel with Brice Marden, Francesco Clemente, and Christopher Wool at MoMA in New York and in 2008, he lectured at the Haus der Kunst in Munich (Luc Tuymans: Arbeit und Praxis) and gave the inaugural lecture at the Neues Museum Weserburg in Bremen at the symposium Arbeit der Bilder: Die Präzens der Bilde sim Dialog zwischen Psychoanalyse, Philosophie und Kunstwissenschaft. In 2009, he took part in the Interdisciplinary Conference at NCCR in Basel; the Coloquim Abschied und Gegenstand during the Platform Project at Wiels in Brussels, and the Lambert Family Lecture, in conversation with T.J. Clark at the Wexner Center in Columbus. In 2010, he participated in the symposium History, Violence, Disquiet held at the Museum of Contemporary Art, Chicago (MCA), and in 2011, he held a conversation with Rem Koolhaas at La Loge in Brussels entitled Construction Européenne. In 2012, he was invited to the Frieze Talks and in 2015 he conducted a talk with Colin Chinnery at the Talbot Rice Gallery. In 2016 he lectured at the Slade Contemporary Art Lecture Series 2015–16 at the Slade School of Fine Art in London, and the same year, he participated in the round table discussion What About Painting Today at LaM Lille Métropole Museum of Modern, Contemporary and Outsider Art, and participated in a public discussion with Kerry James Marshall in Montreal. In 2017, he lectured at the Migros Museum of Contemporary Art in Zurich and alongside Gilane Tawadros at the Royal College of Art in London. In 2018, he gave a public talk on Andrzej Wróblewski at the David Zwirner Gallery in London.

== Selected exhibitions ==
=== Solo exhibitions ===
Over 100 solo exhibitions of Tuymans' paintings were staged between 1985 and 2016, including over 70 international solo exhibitions. The first exhibition of Tuymans' paintings, for the Belgian Art Review (1985), took place in Ostend in a deserted swimming pool at the prestigious Thermae Palace. Tuymans chose Ostend because of James Ensor and Leon Spilliaert, two painters who had a profound influence on his artistic development and whose connection with the city gave it a spiritual significance for him. Besides his parents and a handful of friends, few people saw the exhibition, but it was nonetheless crucial, because it was the first time Tuymans saw his work outside the studio.

The next public exhibition of Tuymans' work was held at Ruimte Morguen in Antwerp in 1988 and the first museum exhibitions devoted exclusively to his work were held in 1990 at the PMMK Provinciaal Museum voor Moderne Kunst in Ostend and at the S.M.A.K. Stedelijk Museum voor Actuele Kunst in Ghent. In the same year, he had his first exhibition at Zeno X, a gallery he continues to work with today.

In 1992, Tuymans made an international breakthrough in his career. Several major exhibitions of his work (at Kunsthalle Bern for example) and his participation in Documenta 9, extended his reputation internationally. Tuymans concluded this first period of his career with a retrospective exhibition held in Krefeld in 1993 at the Museum Haus Lange, Krefelder Kunstmuseen in the two residential houses turned contemporary art museums Haus Lange and Haus Esters. In 1994, his work was shown at Portikus in Frankfurt am Main, an exhibition that travelled to the David Zwirner Gallery in New York, the artist's U.S. gallery. That same year, he had a solo exhibition at the Art Gallery of York University in Toronto which moved on to The Renaissance Society at The University of Chicago, the Institute of Contemporary Arts in London and the Goldie Paley Gallery, Moore College of Art and Design in Philadelphia. In 2001, Tuymans represented Belgium at the Venice Biennale.

Between 2004 and 2008, solo exhibitions devoted to Tuymans were held in diverse locations: at Tate Modern in London in 2004; at Museu Serralves in Porto; at Museu Serralves in Porto; at Műcsarnok Kunsthalle in Budapest in 2007–8; at Zachęta National Gallery of Art in Warsaw and at Haus der Kunst in Munich in 2008.

The artist's first comprehensive U.S. retrospective opened in September 2009 at the Wexner Center for the Arts in Columbus Ohio, then travelling to the San Francisco Museum of Modern Art, the Dallas Museum of Art and the Museum of Contemporary Art, Chicago. This retrospective also travelled beyond the U.S. to BOZAR Centre for Fine Arts, Brussels, in Belgium.

Also in 2009, an exhibition of works inspired by one of Tuymans' favourite authors, Thomas Pynchon, called Against the Day, was held at Wiels Contemporary Art Centre, Brussels, subsequently travelling to Baibakov Art Projects, Moscow, and Moderna Museet Malmö, Sweden. A major solo exhibition was put on in 2015 at QM Gallery Al Riwaq, Doha, entitled Intolerance, and in 2019, Tuymans' major exhibition La pelle was staged at Palazzo Grassi in Venice. This show incorporated 80 paintings dating from 1986 to 2019.

A retrospective of his works, Luc Tuymans: The Past, was featured at the UCCA Center for Contemporary Art (2024–2025).

=== Group exhibitions ===
Tuymans also participated in over 350 group exhibitions between 1985 and 2016, including more than 300 international exhibitions. In 1992, he was invited to show at Documenta in Kassel for the first time and in 2002 he participated in Documenta 11. Work by Tuymans has also been included in group exhibitions such as: Infinite Painting: Contemporary Painting and Global Realism, held at the Villa Manin Centro d’Arte Contemporanea, Codroipo in Italy (2006); Essential Painting, at the National Museum of Art, Osaka, Japan (2006); Fast Forward: Collections for the Dallas Museum of Art, at the Dallas Museum of Art, Dallas, Texas (2007); What is Painting? Contemporary Art From the Collection at The Museum of Modern Art, New York (2007); The Painting of Modern Life at the Hayward Gallery, London, England and the Castle of Rivoli, Turin, Italy (2007); Doing it My Way: Perspectives in Belgian Art at the Museum Küppersmühle für Moderne Kunst, Duisburg, Germany (2008); Collecting Collections: Highlights from the Permanent Collection of the Museum of Contemporary Art, Los Angeles at the Museum of Contemporary Art, Los Angeles, California (2008); Mapping the Studio: Artists from the François Pinault Collection at the Palazzo Grassi, Venice, Italy (2009) and Compass in Hand: Selections from The Judith Rothschild Foundation Contemporary Drawings Collection at The Museum of Modern Art, New York (2009–10).

== Catalogue raisonné ==
In 2019, a comprehensive catalogue raisonné edited by the art historian Eva Meyer-Hermann was published by the David Zwirner Gallery and Yale University Press. Tuymans' paintings dating from 1972 on – 564 in total – are spread between three volumes. Volume I covers the 186 paintings done on canvas or hardboard between 1972 and 1994. Volume II covers 198 paintings on canvas or, on occasion, polyester or vinyl, between 1995 and 2006, and Volume III includes 180 works on canvas dating from 2007 to 2018.

== Art market ==
According to an article published by Artprice in 2019, half of his auction turnover is generated in the United States, and 36% in the United Kingdom. In May 2005, Sculpture (2000), part of Tuymans' Mwana Kitoko (Beautiful White Man) series, was sold at Christie's New York for a record price. In 2005, he was listed 184 in the 'Top 500' selling artists, a ranking compiled by Artprice. Tuymans' auction record was established when Rumour (2001) sold by $2,699,750 at Christie's New York, on 15 May 2013. It was then the best ever auction result for a contemporary Belgian artist. Since then, his paintings have fetched ever-increasing sums. As a result, in 2016, Tuymans was ranked 60 in the ArtReview list of the 100 most powerful people in the art world'. In 2019, Tuymans gained a lot of exposure with his exhibition La Pelle at Palazzo Grassi in Venice. The market reacted accordingly and his works generated even higher turnover on the secondary market, a record year for the artist. In 2015, Tuymans ranked 168 on the 'TOP 500' Contemporary Artists 2014/2015. That year, he ranked 75 in the 'Top 500' best-selling artists worldwide. This brought him into the top 100 most successful artists on the global secondary market. As a result, he is regarded today as one of the most successful European artists, ranked alongside the Italian artists Rudolf Stingel and Maurizio Cattelan, the Belgian artist Harold Ancart, and eight German artists, including Albert Oehlen.

== Recognition ==
In 2007, Tuymans was appointed Commander of the Order of Leopold of Belgium by King Albert II, in 2013, he was made a Foreign Honorary Member of The American Academy of Arts and Letters in New York, and the Academy of Arts (Akademie der Künste) in Berlin. In 2019 he received the Medal of Honor from the International Congress of Contemporary Painting (ICOCEP) in Porto in Portugal. Tuymans holds several academic honours, including an honorary doctorate for overall cultural merit bestowed by the Royal College of Art in 2015, an honorary doctorate bestowed by the University of Arts in Poznań in 2014, and an honorary doctorate for overall cultural merit bestowed by the University of Antwerp in 2006. In 2008, Tuymans received the Max Beckmann Foundation award at the Städelschule. In 2000, he was a finalist for the Vincent van Gogh Biennial Award for Contemporary Art in Europe and won the Coutts Contemporary Art Foundation award in Zurich. In 2013, Tuymans was awarded the Flemish Culture Award for Visual Arts and in 2020 the Ultima award for 'General Cultural Merit'. In 1998, he received the biannual Culture Prize Blanlin-Evrart from the Catholic University of Leuven. In 2013, he was given the award of excellence for his artistic contributions to the fight against AIDS by the AmfAR, The Foundation for AIDS Research Awards.

== Personal life ==
Tuymans was born in Mortsel near Antwerp on 14 June 1958, and he continues to live in Antwerp today. His father, Antoon Tuymans, was Belgian Flemish and his mother, Elisabeth Dam, was Dutch.

In 1995, he met the Venezuelan artist Carla Arocha while working on his first American show at The Renaissance Society in Chicago and four years later, in 1999, they married.

== Selected museums and public collections ==
- 21st Century Museum of Contemporary Art, Kanazawa, Japan
- Albright–Knox Art Gallery, Buffalo, New York
- Art Institute of Chicago, Chicago
- Berkeley Art Museum and Pacific Film Archive, University of California, Berkeley
- The Broad, Los Angeles
- Carnegie Museum of Art, Pittsburgh
- Centre Pompidou, Paris
- Dallas Museum of Art, Dallas
- De Pont Museum of Contemporary Art, Tilburg, The Netherlands
- Des Moines Art Center, Iowa
- Fonds Régional d’Art Contemporain (FRAC) Auvergne, Clermont-Ferrand, France
- Friedrich Christian Flick Collection, Hamburger Bahnhof – Museum für Gegenwart, Berlin
- Fundacion de Serralves, Porto
- Hammer Museum, Los Angeles
- Hirshhorn Museum and Sculpture Garden, Washington, DC
- HVCCA – Hudson Valley Center for Contemporary Art, Peekskill, New York
- The Israel Museum, Jerusalem, Jerusalem
- Kunstmuseen Krefeld, Germany
- Kunstmuseum aan zee (Mu.ZEE), Ostend, Belgium
- Museum of Fine Arts Bern, Bern
- Kunstmuseum Wolfsburg, Wolfsburg
- LACMA Los Angeles County Museum of Art, Los Angeles
- Louisiana Museum, Humlebaek, Denmark
- Musée des Beaux-Arts de Nantes, Nantes
- Museum für Moderne Kunst, Frankfurt
- Museum of Contemporary Art, Antwerp, Antwerp
- Museum of Contemporary Art Chicago, Chicago
- The Museum of Modern Art, New York
- Over Holland Collection, the Netherlands
- Philadelphia Museum of Art, Philadelphia
- Pinakothek der Moderne, Munich
- San Francisco Museum of Modern Art, San Francisco
- Stedelijk Museum voor Actuele Kunst, Ghent
- Solomon R. Guggenheim Museum, New York
- Tate Gallery, London

== See also ==
- List of Belgian painters
- New European Painting

More references (selected monographies)

- Aliaga, Juan Vicente; Loock, Ulrich; Reust, Hans Rudolf; Spector, Nancy (2007). Luc Tuymans (Rev. ed.). London: Phaidon. ISBN 9780714842981.
- Grynsztejn, Madeleine; Molesworth, Helen (2009). Luc Tuymans. San Francisco: San Francisco Museum of Modern Art; Columbus: Wexner Center for the Arts. ISBN 9781933045986. OCLC 939221009.
- Meyer-Hermann, Eva; Tuymans, Luc (2018). Luc Tuymans: catalogue raisonné of the paintings. Volume 1: 1972-1994. New York: David Zwirner Books; New Haven: Yale University Press. p. 492. ISBN 9781941701614. OCLC 1050148364.
- Meyer-Hermann, Eva; Tuymans, Luc (2019). Luc Tuymans: catalogue raisonné of the paintings. Volume 2, 1995-2006. New York: David Zwirner Books; New Haven: Yale University Press. p. 455. ISBN 9780300244670. OCLC 1048937043.
- Meyer-Hermann, Eva; Tuymans, Luc (2019). Luc Tuymans: catalogue raisonné of the paintings. Volume 3, 2007-2018. New York: David Zwirner Books; New Haven: Yale University Press. p. 425. ISBN 9780300247428. OCLC 1048937043.
- Tuymans, Luc; Loock, Ulrich (1992). Luc Tuymans: [Published on the occasion of an exhibition organized by Kunsthalle Bern, Bern, March 14 – April 26, 1992]. Bern: Kunsthalle. p. 269. ISBN 9780714842981. OCLC 881709830.
- Tuymans, Luc; Helfenstein, Josef; Reust, Hans Rudolf; Rinder, Lawrence (1997). Luc Tuymans: Premonition, Zeichnungen/Drawings [Published on the occasion of an exhibition organized by Kunsthalle Bern, Bern, April 23 – June 29, 1997, Berkeley Art Museum, Oktober 10 – December 31, 1997; Capc Musée d'art contemporain, Bordeaux, January 30 – April 11, 1998]. Wabern-Bern, Germany: Benteli. p. 208. ISBN 9783716510698. OCLC 884075562.
- Tuymans, Luc; Storr, Robert; Hoet, Jan (2001). Luc Tuymans: Mwana Kitoko, Beautiful White Man: [Published on the occasion of an exhibition organized by S.M.A.K Stedelijk Museum voor Actuele Kunst at the Belgian Pavilion in the Giardini of Venice, La Biennale di Venezia, Venice, June 10 – November 4, 2001]. Ghent, Belgium: S.M.A.K Stedelijk Museum voor Actuele Kunst. p. 135. OCLC 496300303.
- Tuymans, Luc (2006). Luc Tuymans - Dusk, Penumbra [Published on the occasion of an exhibition organized by Museu Serralves, Museu de Arte Contemporânea, Porto, exhibition held July 14 – October 15, 2006. Porto: Museu Serralves. OCLC 496300303.
- Tuymans, Luc; Vermeiren, Gerrit; Roelstraete, Dieter; Albores Gleason, Montserrat (2007). Luc Tuymans: I Don't Get It [exhibition held June 1 through September 9, 2007, MuHKA Museum van Hedendaagse Kunst Antwerpen, Antwerp. Ghent: Ludion. OCLC 225870510.
- Tuymans, Luc; Tolnai, Ottó (2007). Luc Tuymans: Retrospective [Published on the occasion of an exhibition organized by Műcsarnok Kunsthalle, Budapest, December 15, 2007 – February 11, 2008; traveled as Wenn der Frühling kommt, Haus der Kunst, Munich, March 2 – May 12, 2008]. Stockmans/De Vos.
- Tuymans, Luc; Wingate, Donna (2012). Luc Tuymans: exhibitions at David Zwirner 1994–2012. Antwerp, Belgium: Ludion. p. 223. OCLC 966068539.
- Tuyamns, Luc; Cooke, Lynne. Luc Tuymans: Intolerance [Published on the occasion of an exhibition organized by Qatar Museums at QM Gallery Al Riwaq, Doha, October 18, 2015 – January 30, 2016]. Dawḥah, Qatar: Qatar Museums, Antwerp: Ludion. p. 464. OCLC 945655579.
- Tuymans, Luc; Demaegd, Frank (2016). Scramble: 25 Years of Collaboration [Published on the occasion of an exhibition organized by Zeno X Gallery, Antwerp, September 7 – October 22, 2016. Antwerp: Zeno X Books. p. 257. OCLC 1119659035.

Writings by the artist (selected)

- Tuymans, Luc; Boehm, Gottfried; Clark, T.J.; De Wolf, Hans M. (2018). Robecchi, Michele (ed.). Luc Tuymans: The Image Revisited (Rev. ed.). Antwerp: Ludion. ISBN 9789491819797.
- Tuymans, Luc (2019). "Introduction". In Bandera, Maria Cristina (ed.). Among others: Blackness at MoMA. New York: The Museum of Modern Art. p. 352. ISBN 9781633450349. OCLC 1086343696.
- Tuymans, Luc (2018). "Introduction". Sanguine Luc Tuymans on Baroque. Milan: Fondazione Prada. pp. 7–9. ISBN 9788887029741. OCLC 1113309887.
- Tuymans, Luc (2013). "My Name Is Nobody". In Bandera, Maria Cristina (ed.). Giorgio Morandi: A Retrospective. Brussels: BOZAR Books; Milan: Silvana Editoriale. pp. 194–97. ISBN 9788836625949. OCLC 888583890.
- Tuymans, Luc (2012). "Curating the Library, Transcript of Lecture". In Burioni, Matteo; Boehm, Gottfried (eds.). Der Grund: das Feld des Sichtbaren. München: Verlag Wilhelm Fink. pp. 474–83. ISBN 9783770550746. OCLC 647901030.
- Tuymans, Luc (2011). "Excellence". In Hans, e Wolf (ed.). Jeff Wall: The Crooked Path. Exh. cat. Ludion; Brussels: BOZAR Books: Antwerp. p. 49. ISBN 9789055448623. OCLC 793128890.
- Tuymans, Luc (2011). "Inleiding/Introduction". In Biasino, Fabrice (ed.). Feuilleton: Angel Vergara. Venice Biennale, Esposizione Internazionale d'Arte, Belgian Pavilion, Venice – 57. Antwerp: Ludion. p. 25. ISBN 9789055448524. OCLC 778945490.
- Tuymans, Luc (2010). "Boys and Science". In Schmidt, Hans-Werner; Schwenk, Bernhart (eds.). Neo Rauch: Paintings. Exh. cat. Museum der bildenden Künste; Pinakothek der Moderne, Munich. Ostfildern-Ruit: Hatje Cantz Verlag. pp. 98–99. OCLC 932596070.
- Tuymans, Luc (2008). "When Spring Comes: A Guided Tour with Luc Tuymans". In Dander, Patrizia; Wingate, Donna (eds.). Luc Tuymans: Wenn der Frühling kommt. Ed. cat. Haus der Kunst, Munich. Antwerp: Ludion. pp. 9–13. ISBN 9789491819032. OCLC 938773758.
- Tuymans, Luc (2006). "Het verboden rijk (The Forbidden Empire)". Het verboden rijk: wereldbeelden van Chinese en Vlaamse meesters. Exh. Cat. Centre for Fine Arts, Brussels, and Palace Museum, Beijing. Brussels: Bozar Books and Fonds Mercator. ISBN 9789061537137. OCLC 647771692.
- Tuymans, Luc (2006). "On the Image". In Reust, Hans Rudolf (ed.). Luc Tuymans: Dusk/Penumbra. Exh. Cat. Museu Serralves. Porto: Museu Serralves. ISBN 9789727391646. OCLC 938742300.
- Tuymans, Luc (2006). "La Correspondance (reprint from 1986)". Luc Tuymans: Dusk/Penumbra, n.p. Exh. cat. Porto: Museu Serralves. ISBN 9789727391646. OCLC 938742300.
- Tuymans, Luc (2005). "Daylight". Kerry James Marshall: Along the Way. London: Camden Arts Centre. pp. 27, 30–31. ISBN 9781900470544. OCLC 796082489.
- Tuymans, Luc (2001). "Der Frühling kommt: Ideen, Fragen und Bemerkungen zum Konzept einer Ausstellung". Signal. Exh. cat. Hamburger Bahnhof – Museum für Gegenwart, Berlin. Berlin: Staatliche Museen zu Berlin. pp. 2–3. ISBN 9783886094493. OCLC 313837829.
- Tuymans, Luc (1997). "The Broken Mirror". In Celant, Germano (ed.). Futoro presente passato/ Future Present Past. Exh. cat. Venice: Fondazione La Biennale di Venezia. Milan: Electa. p. 626. ISBN 9788843561544. OCLC 501499461.
- Tuymans, Luc (1992). "Disenchantment". In Loock, Ulrich (ed.). Luc Tuymans. Bern: Kunsthalle Bern. pp. 11–36. ISBN 9783857800795. OCLC 881709830.
- Official website
- Luc Tuymans, The Museum of Modern Art
- Luc Tuymans, Tate Modern
- Luc Tuymans, Zeno X Gallery
- Luc Tuymans, David Zwirner Gallery
