= Carla Arocha =

Venezuelan artist (born 1961)

- Born: Carla Giomar Arocha Bello; 30 October 1961 (age 64); Caracas, Venezuela
- Education: Saint Xavier University, Chicago; University of Illinois at Chicago; Art Institute of Chicago
- Known for: Painting, drawing, installation art
- Movement: Contemporary art
- Spouses: David Preiss (before 1999) Luc Tuymans (m. 1999)
- Website: arocha-schraenen.com

Carla Arocha (Spanish pronunciation: [ˈkaɾla aˈɾotʃa]; born October 30, 1961) is a Venezuelan artist renowned for her contributions to Minimalism, design, and geometric abstraction, particularly drawing inspiration from her native Venezuela. Currently based in Antwerp, she has gained international recognition for her work, which has been exhibited worldwide since the mid-1990s.

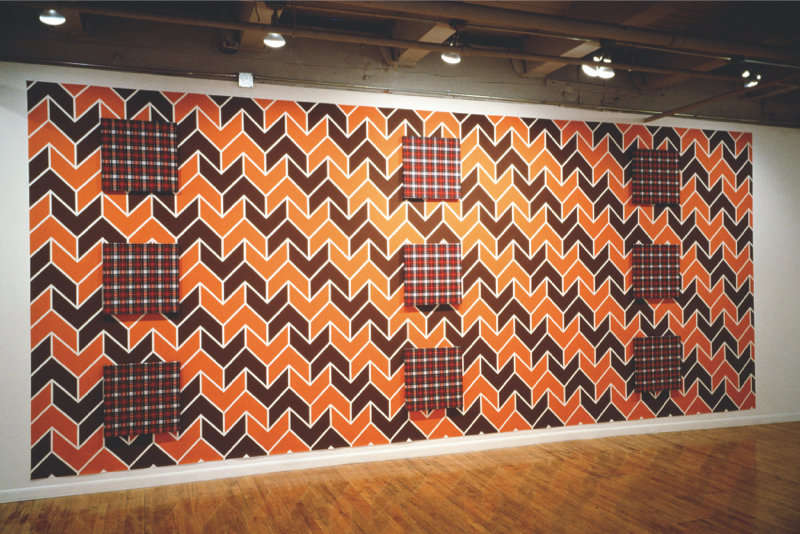
Carla Arocha, Then, 1994, Latex on muslin and stretched flannel, (274 x 643 cm) 108 x 253 in.

== Education ==
Carla Arocha earned a Bachelor of Science degree from Saint Xavier University (SXU) in 1986. Initially trained as a biologist, she later shifted her focus to pursue her passion for art. Arocha then went on to obtain a Bachelor of Fine Arts degree from the School of the Art Institute of Chicago (SAIC) in 1991, followed by a Master of Fine Arts from the University of Illinois at Chicago (UIC) in 1994.

== Work ==
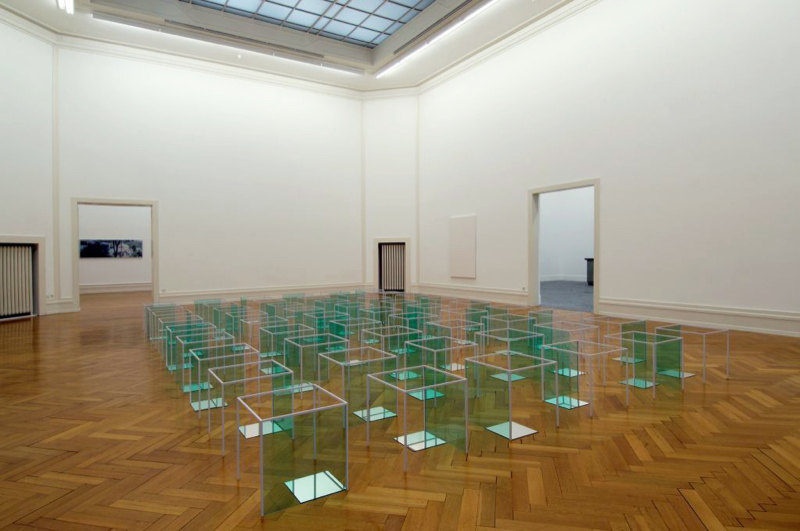
Carla Arocha, Tremor, 2006, Cubic structures, plexiglass, and mirror, Coll. Fonds régional d'art contemporain Bourgogne, Dijon. Installation view of the exhibition Carla Arocha: Dirt, Kunsthalle Bern, Bern, 2006.

Arocha initially gained recognition in the mid-1990s through a series of works that drew inspiration from art, fashion, and biology. One notable piece, her drawing Aqua Trace (1998), illustrates a striking fusion of two distinct patterns: leopard spots and blood cells. Executed in a vibrant aqua hue, the convergence of these patterns evokes the aesthetic of animal prints commonly found in textiles. Aqua Trace is thematically linked to Arocha's mirrored plexiglass installation titled Hide, which was created as part of a site-specific installation program of the Museum of Contemporary Art, Chicago, curated by Julie Rodrigue, Arocha's installation took shape within the museum's four-tiered atrium. The artwork comprises 914 laser-cut reflective plexiglass shapes, each featuring a unique form, providing adaptability for diverse configurations during each exhibition. Titled Hide, the work draws connections with the German term haut, signifying skin, intertwining with the body, and the concept of self.

In contrast to her bold and lavish Plexiglas installations and kinetic mobiles, Carla Arocha's paintings present a quieter aesthetic. These works, often characterized by flat forms and a minimalist approach, nonetheless reveal the artist's enduring fascination with ornamentation.

This interplay between simplicity and embellishment is evident in works like House (1999). Here, the rigid lines of a simple pitched-roof dwelling are enlivened by dynamic, swirling loops. Similarly, large vertical canvases like Blind Folded and Flare (both 1999) showcase Arocha's affinity for patterns. These works feature monochromatic backgrounds that become canvases for intricate arrangements of dots, diamonds, and organic motifs. A closer examination often reveals subtle variations in the paint's reflective quality, hinting at Arocha's underlying penchant for a touch of the extravagant.

In 2006, Carla Arocha began collaboration with Stéphane Schraenen. Together, they form the artist-duo Arocha & Schraenen.

== Exhibitions ==
Arocha held her inaugural American solo museum exhibition at the El Museo del Barrio museum in New York in 1996. Subsequently, in 1997, Arocha gallery's debut was at Chicago's Rhona Hoffman Gallery. From September 1997 to March 1998, the Cranbrook Art Museum in Bloomfield Hills, Michigan organized Arocha's exhibition titled Carla Preiss: Somewhere. In the same year, the MCA Museum of Contemporary Art (MCA) in Chicago commissioned Arocha for a solo project for its main entrance hall. Arocha's creation comprised clusters of leopard-print patterns crafted with mirrored Plexiglas, offering the flexibility for reconfiguration with each installation. In 2001–2002, Arocha developed a new artwork titled Rover for the café windows of the MCA as part of the Hide installation, which was already integrated into the MCA Collection.

In Europe, Carla Arocha's work has been showcased in significant solo exhibitions at esteemed institutions, including Antwerp's Museum van Hedendaagse Kunst Antwerpen (MuHKA) in 2005–2006, and the Fonds régional d'art contemporain d'Auvergne in Clermont-Ferrand in 2006. In 2006, Bern's Kunsthalle in Switzerland organized Arocha's first major retrospective in Europe: Carla Arocha: Dirt, which was displayed from April to May. Curated by the then-director of Kunsthalle Bern, Philippe Pirotte, and Jesús Fuenmayor in close collaboration with the artist, this retrospective illuminated various facets of her artistic oeuvre. During this exhibition, Carla Arocha invited Stéphane Schraenen to produce a number of artworks. This exchange of ideas marked the beginning of a long-term collaboration that continues to this day.

Since 2006, artworks resulting from Arocha's collaboration with Stéphane Schraenen have been exhibited under the name of Carla Arocha & Stéphane Schraenen in prestigious museums worldwide. These exhibitions include London's Wallace Collection in 2011, Centro de Arte Contemporáneo de Caja de Burgos (CAB) in Spain in 2012; Berlin's Künstlerhaus Bethaniën in 2012; and Mechelen's Cultuurcentrum in Belgium in 2014.

=== Solo exhibitions (selection) ===
- Carla Arocha: Chris (in collaboration with Stéphane Schraenen) at Fonds régional d'art contemporain Auvergne, Clermont-Ferrand, 2006
- Carla Arocha (in collaboration with Stéphane Schraenen) at Koraalberg, Antwerp, 2006
- Dirt at Kunsthalle Bern, Bern, 2006
- Smoke at Galería OMR, Mexico City, 2004
- By chance at Monique Meloche Gallery, Chicago, 2003
- Rover at Objectif Exhibitions, Antwerp, 2002
- Underground at Monique Meloche Gallery, Chicago, 2001
- Zipper at Dorothée De Pauw Gallery, Brussels, 2000
- Hover: New Work at Kavi Gupta Gallery (formerly Vedanta Gallery), Chicago, 1999
- Somewhere, at Cranbrook Art Museum, Bloomfield Hills, 1998
- Hide & Rover at MCA Museum of Contemporary Art, Chicago, 1997, and 2001–2002
- Gate at Hermetic Gallery, Milwaukee, 1997
- Carla Preiss: New Work at Rhona Hoffman Gallery, Chicago, 1996–1997
- Portrait: A Site-Specific Installation by Carla Preiss at the El Museo del Barrio, New York, 1996

== Collections ==
Arocha's artworks are featured in the public collections of numerous museums across the United States, Europe, and South America. These include New York's MoMA; Chicago's Museum of Contemporary Art; the Art Institute of Chicago; Antwerp's Museum of Contemporary Art; Bern's Kunsthalle Bern in Switzerland; the Fonds régional d'art contemporain d'Auvergne in Clermont-Ferrand; the Fundación Banco Mercantil in Caracas; and the Boca Raton Museum of Art in Boca Raton, Florida, US.

== Personal life ==
Born in Caracas, Venezuela, Arocha was raised in a family of lawyers. The modern art in her home country, along with the presence of artists such as Jesús Rafael Soto, Carlos Cruz-Diez and Alejandro Otero, influenced her.

In December 1979, Arocha moved to Chicago, where she studied biology and art while also marrying David Preiss. After graduating from the University of Illinois at Chicago in 1994, she met Belgian painter Luc Tuymans in 1995, during his preparations for his first American show at Chicago's Renaissance Society. In 1999, Arocha made the decision to move to Belgium and marry Tuymans. The couple currently live and work in Antwerp.

== Publications ==
For information about Carla Arocha's work in collaboration with Stéphane Schraenen see:

- Arocha, Carla, Schraenen Stéphane, and Kate Christina Mayne. (2014). Persiana: Carla Arocha - Stéphane Schraenen: Cultuurcentrum Mechelen . Antwerpen, Belgium: Ludion.
- Fuemayor, Jesús. (2016).Flujo Disperso / Blurry Flux: Carla Arocha & Stéphane Schraenen Colectión Mercantil . Caracas: Mercantil Arte y Cultura A.C.
- Pratt, Ken, Helen Anne Molesworth, Irmgard Hölscher, Katharina Pencz, Magda Walicka, Carla Arocha, and Stéphane Schraenen. ( 2013). What Now? Carla Arocha - Stephane Schraenen . After: Carla Arocha & Stéphane Schraenen . Burgos: Obra Social De La Caja De Burgos.

== See also ==
- List of Venezuelans
- List of Latin American artists
- List of Venezuelan women artists
