= Art of Belgium =

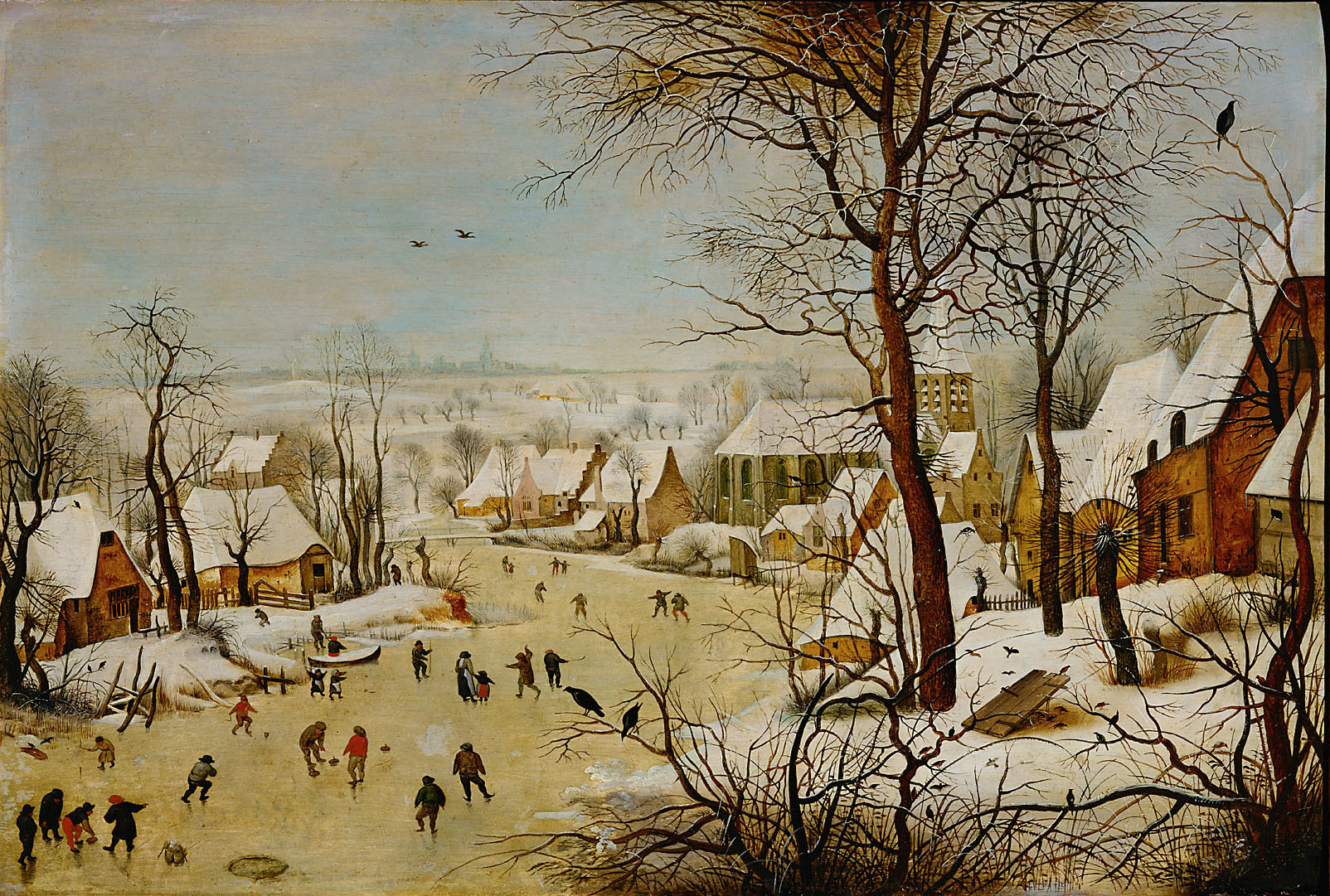
A typical scene of peasant life, Winter Landscape with a Bird Trap (1565) by Pieter Bruegel the Elder

Despite its size, Belgium has a long and distinguished artistic tradition that goes back to the Middle Ages, considerably pre-dating the foundation of the current state in 1830. Art from the areas making up modern Belgium is called in English Netherlandish up to the separation with the Netherlands from 1570 on, and Flemish until the 18th century.

Important monasteries in Belgium were centres of production in Carolingian art and Ottonian art, and later the area producing Romanesque Mosan art is now largely in Belgium. Flanders became one of the richest areas in Europe in the later Middle Ages and Early Netherlandish painting produced work for both the wealthy townspeople as well as the courtiers of the Duke of Burgundy.

In the Renaissance Antwerp Mannerism was an early attempt by Flemish artists to respond to Italian Renaissance art, with Romanism a later phase. Dutch and Flemish Renaissance painting culminated in the work of Pieter Bruegel the Elder in one direction, and the Flemish contribution to Northern Mannerism in a very different one. Flemish Baroque painting is dominated by the figure of Rubens, though like his pupil Anthony van Dyck, he spent much of his career abroad. There was also a great development of specialized genres in painting, paralleling those in Dutch Golden Age painting to the north, but with many differences.

== History of Belgian art ==
=== Medieval art ===
Mosan art is a regional style of Romanesque art from the valleys of the Meuse in present-day Wallonia, and the Rhineland, with manuscript illumination, metalwork, and enamel work from the 11th, 12th and 13th centuries. Among them the masterpiece of Renier de Huy and perhaps of the whole Mosan art Baptismal font at St Bartholomew's Church, Liège. The architecture of Romanesque churches of the Walloon country is also named Mosan, for example the Collegiate Church of Saint Gertrude in Nivelles, and the churches of Waha and Hastière, Dinant. Ornamental brassware is also a part of Mosan art and Hugo d'Oignies and Nicholas of Verdun important metalworkers. The Mosan Art reliquary shrines in are important phenomenon of Mosan art.

=== Early Modern art ===
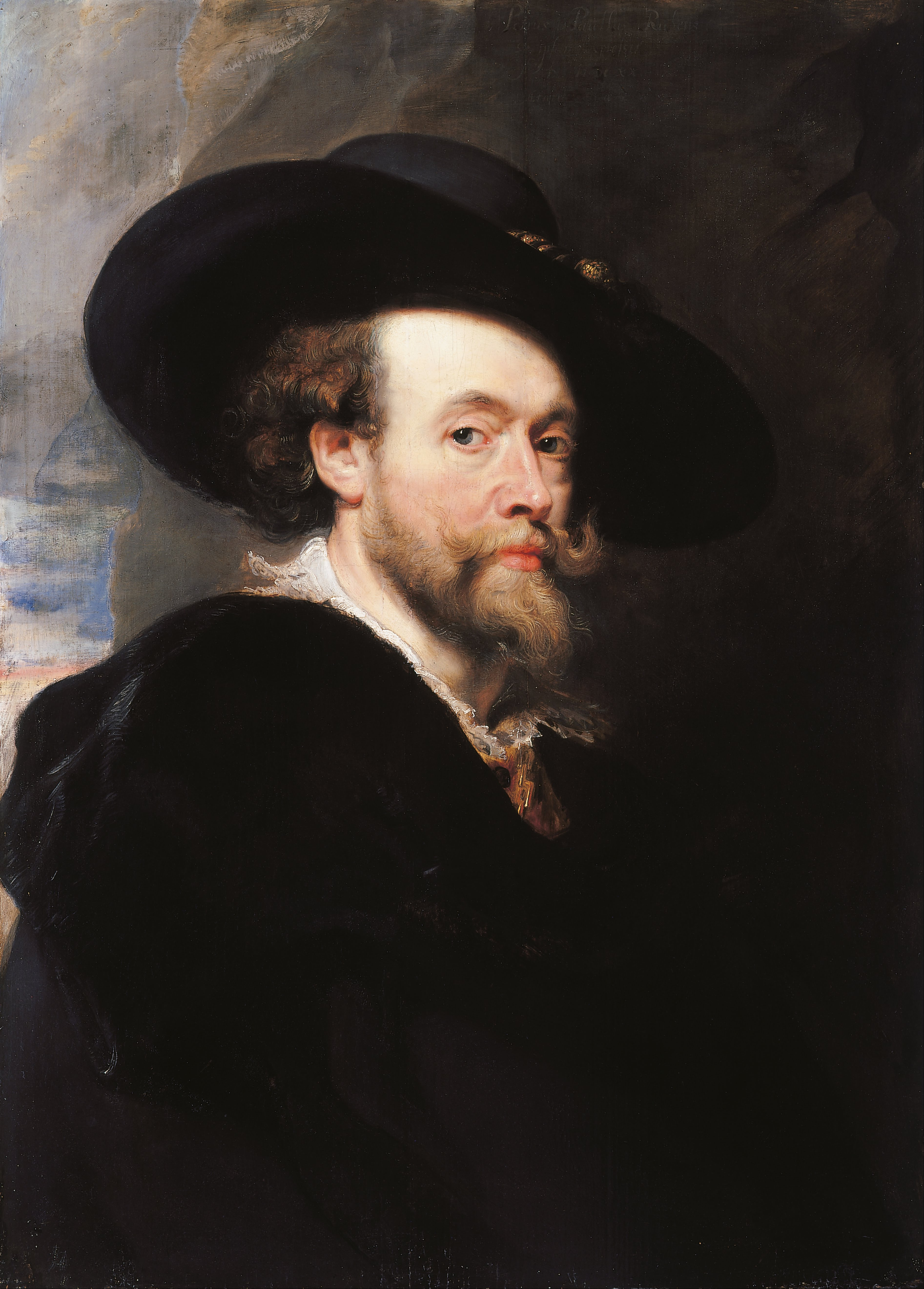
Self Portrait (1623) by Peter Paul Rubens

During the so-called Northern Renaissance, Belgium experienced an artistic boom, spawning the immensely popular Baroque Flemish school of painting. The cities of Bruges and Antwerp, some of the richest in the region, became artistic centres during the period.

A very famous painter during the Renaissance was Jan Van Eyck (Maaseik, 1399), who was active from 1410 until 1441. Among the most famous of his works is the Ghent Altarpiece (1432), which his brother Hubert Van Eyck (1366-1426) started working on.

The artist Peter Paul Rubens painted in Belgium between 1609 and 1621, working for many royal patrons from his studio in Antwerp. Rubens' house in Antwerp, the Rubenshuis, is now a museum.

Anthony van Dyck, celebrated for his painting of British court, including Charles I, was born in Antwerp.

Flemish art was not confined to the boundaries of modern Flanders and several leading artists came from or worked in areas in which langues d'oïl were spoken, from the region of modern Wallonia, e.g. Robert Campin, Rogier van der Weyden (Rogier de la Pasture) and Jacques Daret. Joachim Patinir and Henri Blès are generally called Mosan painters. Lambert Lombard (Liège, 1505 – 1566) was a Renaissance painter, architect and theorist for the Prince-Bishopric of Liège. Gérard de Lairesse and Bertholet Flemalle were also important painters in the Prince-Bishopric of Liège.

==== The Brueghel Dynasty ====
See also Bruegel Family

Flemish genre painting is strongly tied to the traditions of Pieter Bruegel the Elder and was a style that continued directly into the 17th century through copies and new compositions made by his sons Pieter Brueghel the Younger and Jan Brueghel the Elder. Many of these are kermis paintings and scenes of peasants partaking other outdoor enjoyments viewed from an elevated viewpoint.

=== Belgian art in the 19th-20th centuries ===
==== Neoclassicism ====
In the 18th century painting in the Southern Low Countries became increasingly focused on France. Many Flemish and Walloon painters studied in Paris and adopted the new neoclassical style en vogue in the last decades of the 18th century. The Bruges painter Joseph-Benoît Suvée made a career in the French capital where he was a rival of Jacques-Louis David. The latter settled in Brussels after the fall of Napoleon. Their major followers in Belgium (then part of the United Kingdom of the Netherlands) were Joseph Denis Odevaere and François-Joseph Navez.

==== Impressionism and neo-impressionism ====
Originating in France, Impressionism was also adopted by Belgian artists. Emile Claus is the most well known representative of 'Luminism', an art movement inspired by Impressionist plein-air painting. The young avant-garde painter James Ensor experimented briefly with Impressionism but soon found his very own style. Painters of his generation were more inspired by French Pointillism, most notably by Seurat and Signac. The young Henry Van de Velde made a few works in a pure pointillist style but was also deeply influenced by Vincent van Gogh. Anna Boch, Eugène Boch (a close friend of Vincent van Gogh), Georges Lemmen and Théo van Rysselberghe were all influential Belgian neo-impressionist painters.

==== Belgian Surrealism ====
Surrealism developed in Belgium during the inter-war period. The best-known Belgian surrealist, René Magritte, exhibited in 1927 for the first time.

=== Sculpture ===
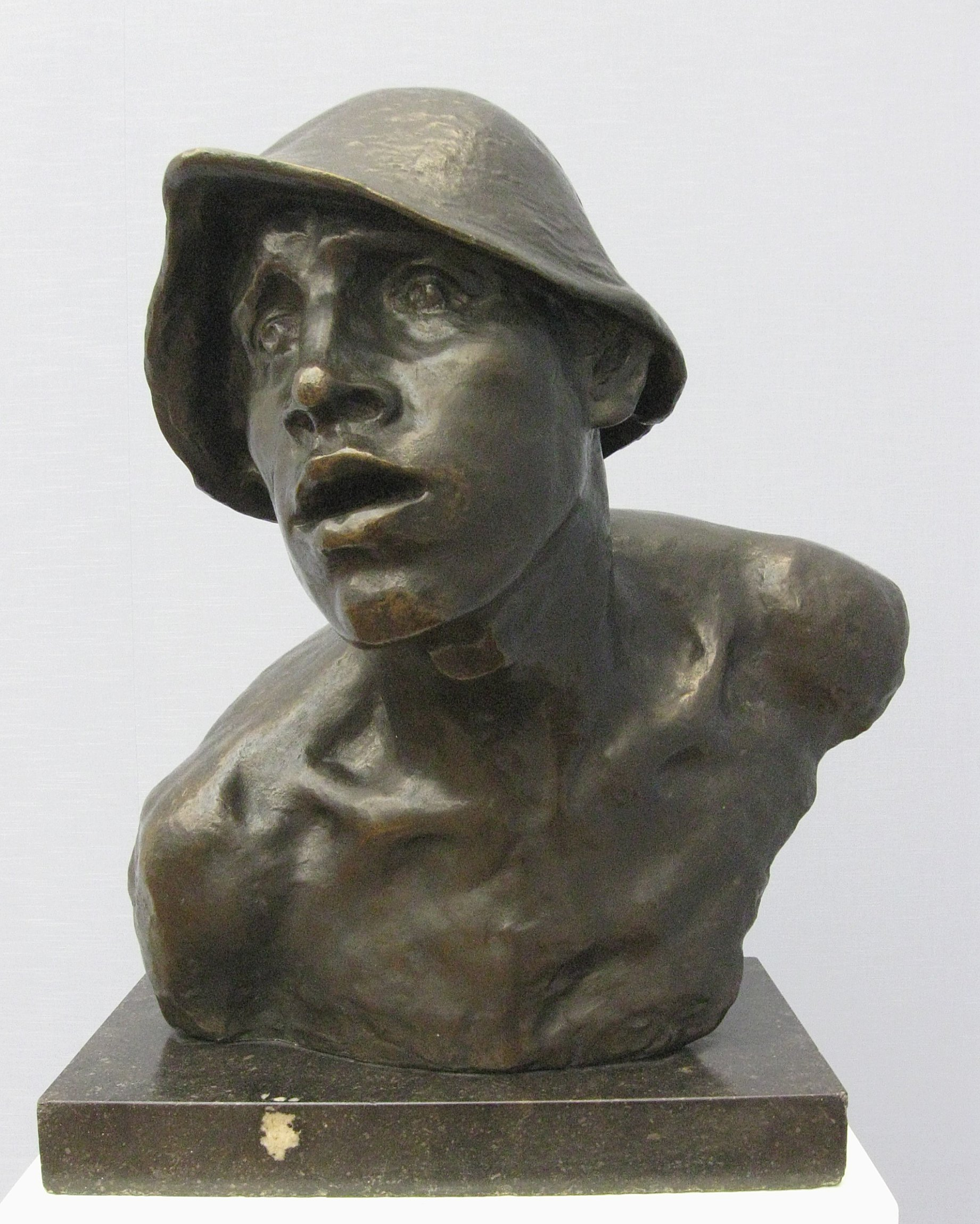
The Iron Worker (1890 by Constantin Meunier)

Jacques Du Brœucq was a sculptor of the 16th century, known for his religious scenes and as the teacher of the famous Italian late-renaissance sculptor Giambologna, who was himself born in Flanders.

Constantin Meunier was an influential Belgian sculptor of the late 19th-early 20th century, known for his figures, which unusually, often depict industrial workers. Meunier's work was very popular around Europe, coinciding with the rise of the political Labour movement in the late 19th century.

George Grard (1901 — 1984) was a Walloon sculptor, known above all for his representations of the female, in the manner of Pierre Renoir and Aristide Maillol, modelled in clay or plaster, and cast in bronze. Working in Liège too, Jean Del Cour, the sculptor of the Virgin in Vinâve d'Isle, Léon Mignon the sculptor of Li Tore, and Louis Jéhotte known for his statue of the Frankish emperor Charlemagne.

=== Architecture ===
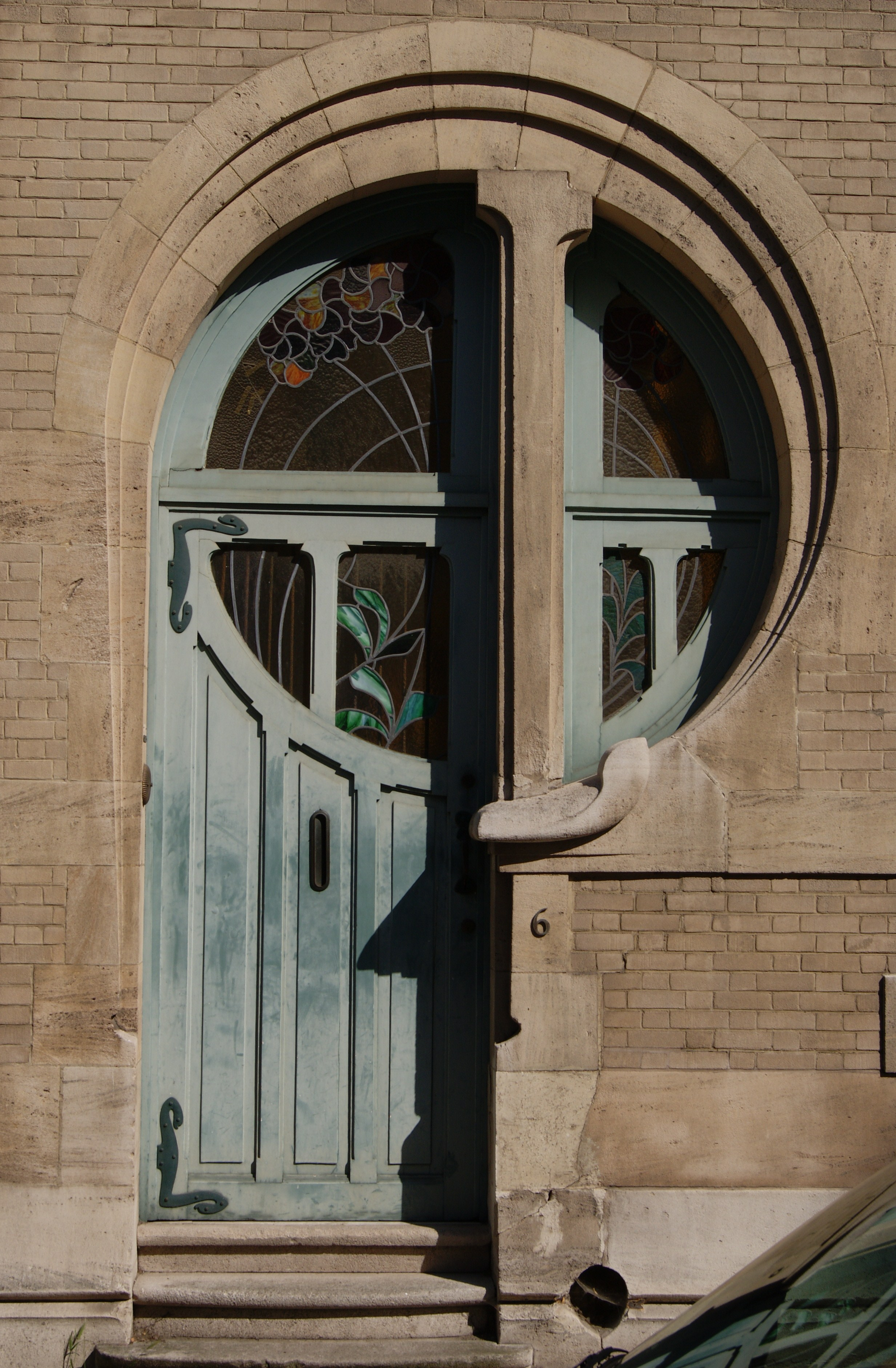
An Art Nouveau doorway in Ixelles, designed by Ernest Delune and built in 1902.

Belgian architects had been at the forefront of the Neoclassical architecture movement between the mid 18th and 20th centuries. The style enjoyed great popularity in Belgium and several neoclassical masterpieces, including Gembloux Abbey and the Château de Seneffe survive.

In the last quarter of the 19th century, the Belgian architect and furniture designer Gustave Serrurier-Bovy is credited (along with Belgian architects Paul Hankar, Victor Horta and Henry van de Velde) with creating the Art Nouveau style, coined as a style in Paris by Bing.

The Art Nouveau style enjoyed considerable popularity in Belgium until after the First World War. Numerous houses around Belgium in the Art Nouveau style designed by Victor Horta survive (though not his masterpiece, the Maison du Peuple) which are classified as by UNESCO as a World Heritage Site.

=== Cartoons ===
Comic art (known as bande dessinée or the 9th Art) first became popular in Belgium in the 1920s, but achieved huge popularity internationally after the Second World War. It is considered an essential part of Belgian visual culture, as well as one of the country's main artistic influences internationally. The best known series, The Adventures of Tintin by Hergé, first appeared in 1929, and have been translated into fifty languages, selling a total of 200 million copies. Belgian artists were heavily involved in the pioneering of the Ligne Claire and other artistic styles in comic strips.

A museum in Brussels, the Belgian Comic Strip Center, is devoted to Belgian cartoon art.

== Notable art collections in Belgium ==
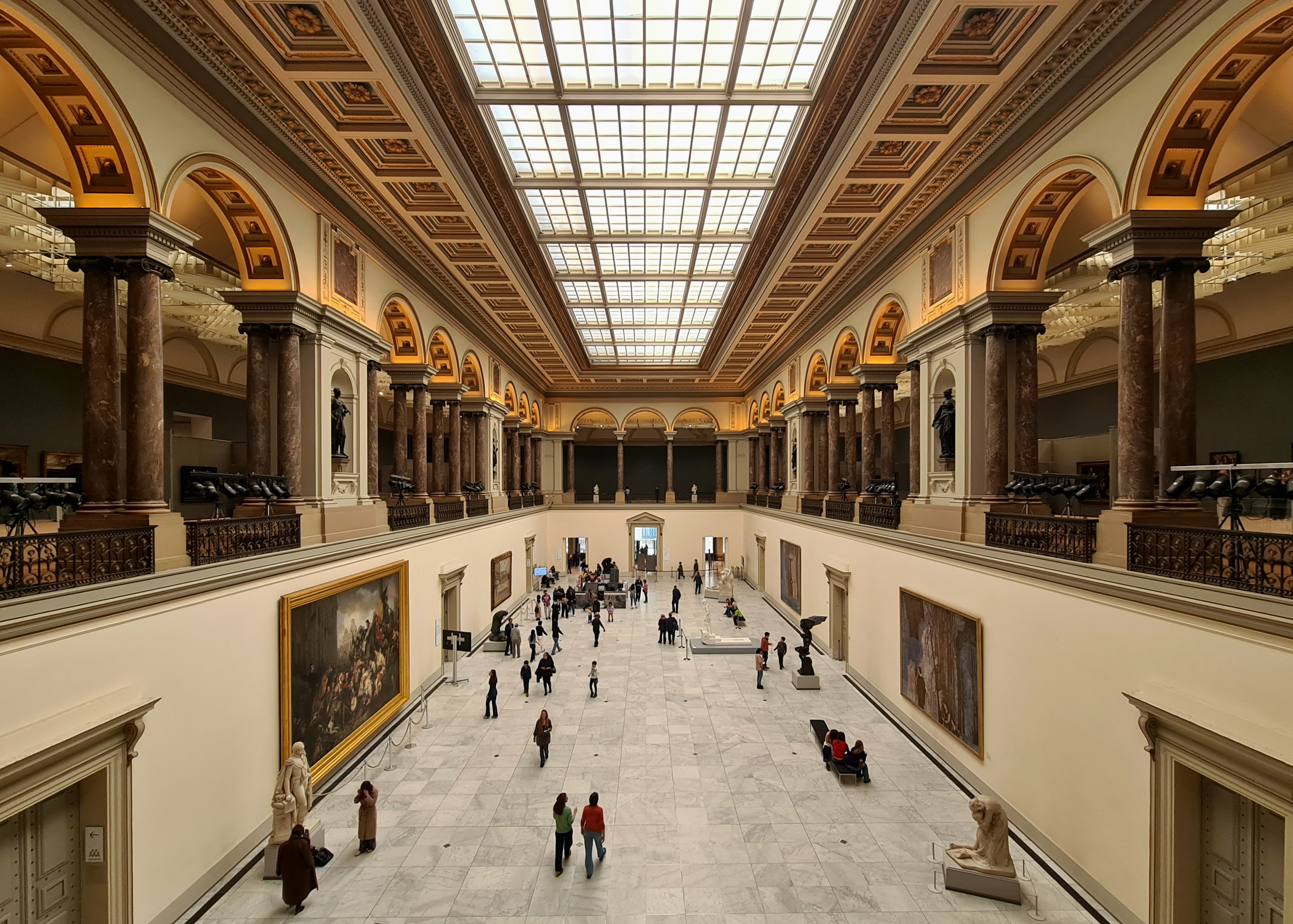
Main Hall of the Oldmasters Museum, part of the Royal Museums of Fine Arts in Brussels

The most significant art collection in the country is the national collection at the Royal Museums of Fine Arts of Belgium in Brussels, however, there are more than a dozen other significant art collections around the country.

Some of the most impressive are the Royal Museum for Fine Arts in Antwerp, which houses a considerable collection of works by Peter Paul Rubens, the Groeningemuseum in Bruges, which exhibits Flemish Primitives, the Musée des Beaux-Arts Tournai which contains important works of important 19th century French painters like Manet, Monet, Seurat and others, the Museum of Fine Arts, Ghent (MSK) which focuses on Flemish Art (Southern Netherlands) but also has several European - especially French - paintings and sculptures and the Museum Aan de Stroom (MAS), Antwerp, which is the biggest museum in Belgium.

There are also numerous smaller museums, often supported by the state, focused on individual artists, with museums devoted to Magritte, Wiertz and Meunier amongst many others.

Belgium also has numerous galleries devoted to collections of non-indigenous art, including Oriental, Classical and Congolese painting, sculpture and other visual art.

== See also ==
- Cinema of Belgium
