= David Zwirner Gallery =

Contemporary art gallery

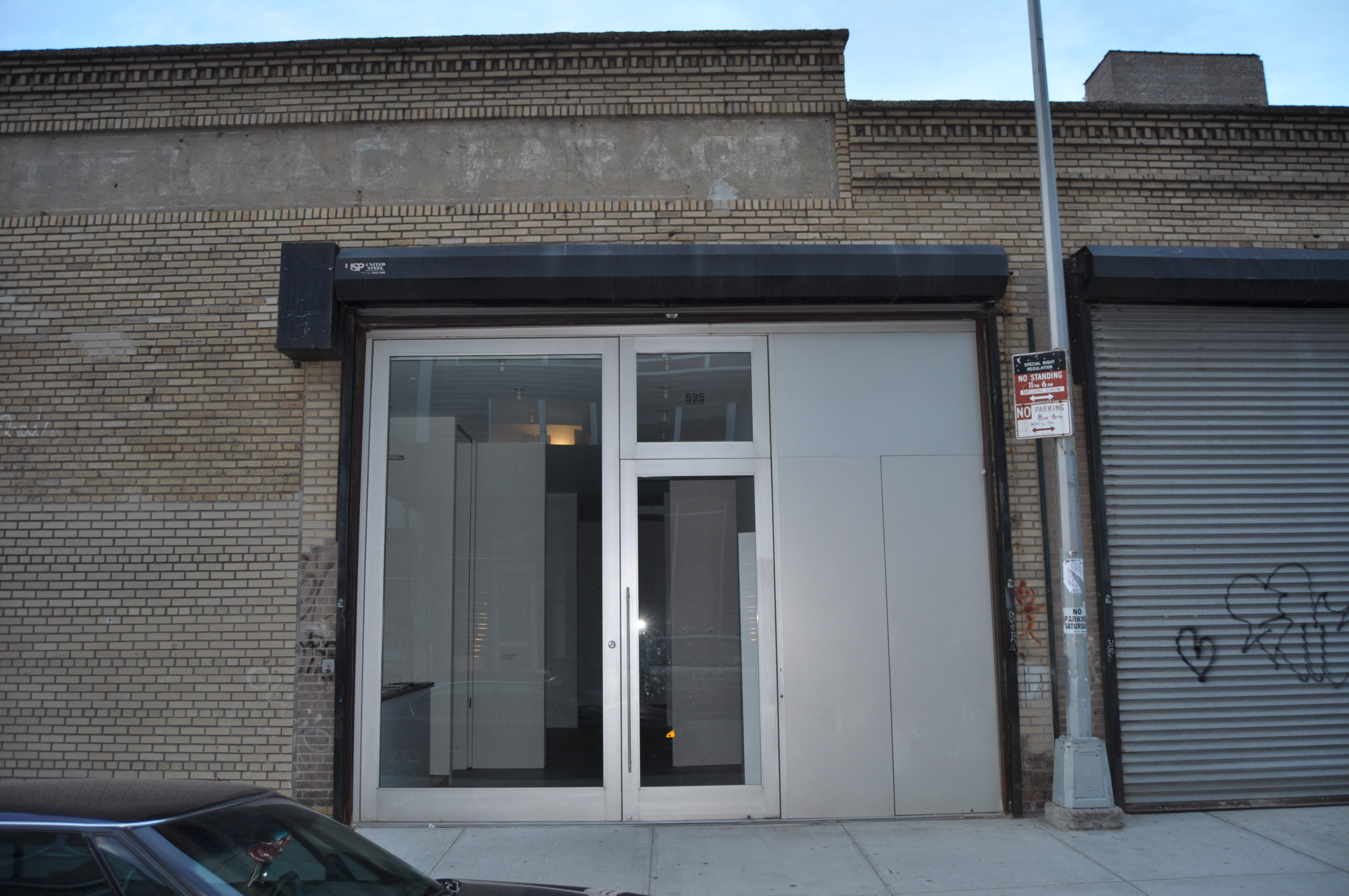
- Formation: 1993
- Type: Art gallery
- Locations: 525 & 533 West 19th Street, New York; 537 West 20th Street, New York; 52 Walker Street, New York; 612 & 616 North Western Avenue, Los Angeles; 24 Grafton Street, London; 108 Rue Vieille du Temple, Paris; 5–6/F, H Queen's, 80 Queen's Road Central, Central, Hong Kong
- Coordinates: 40°44′44.89″N 74°0′25.26″W
- Website: www.davidzwirner.com

David Zwirner Gallery is an American contemporary art gallery owned by David Zwirner. It has three gallery spaces in New York City and one each in Los Angeles, London, Hong Kong, and Paris.

== History ==
The Zwirner Gallery opened in 1993 on the ground floor of 43 Greene Street in SoHo in New York City with a one-man show of the Austrian sculptor Franz West.

In 2002 it moved to 525 West 19th Street in the Chelsea neighborhood of New York. In 2012 it opened a 930 m^{2} (10,000 sq ft) London branch in Grafton Street, in Mayfair, and built a large new space, designed by Annabelle Selldorf, at 537 West 20th Street, Chelsea, New York.

In September 2017 it opened an Upper East Side space in a 1907 townhouse off Madison Avenue, redesigned by Selldorf. A 930 m^{2} (10,000 sq ft) space at the H Queen's building in Hong Kong was also designed by Selldorf. That space closed in July 2026 upon the completion of renovations at 525 W. 19th Street.

In 2019 the gallery opened an 800 m^{2} (8,600 sq ft) outpost in the Marais district of Paris, its first in continental Europe.

The gallery opened 52 Walker, an offshoot exhibition space in New York's Tribeca neighborhood in 2021. 52 Walker was developed by curator Ebony L. Haynes, a director at the gallery who was hired in 2020. Her concept for a new program with the gallery included all-black staff hosting rotating exhibitions in a kunsthalle style, which Zwirner said inspired him to put her in charge of a new separate, autonomous exhibition space.

In 2023 it opened a 1,300 m^{2} (15,000 sq ft) branch in the Melrose Hill neighborhood of Los Angeles, California.

According to The New York Times in 2018, the gallery reports annual revenue of $500 million. Given the overall size of its operations, it is often compared to Gagosian Gallery and Hauser & Wirth.
