= Skip Arnold =

American contemporary artist

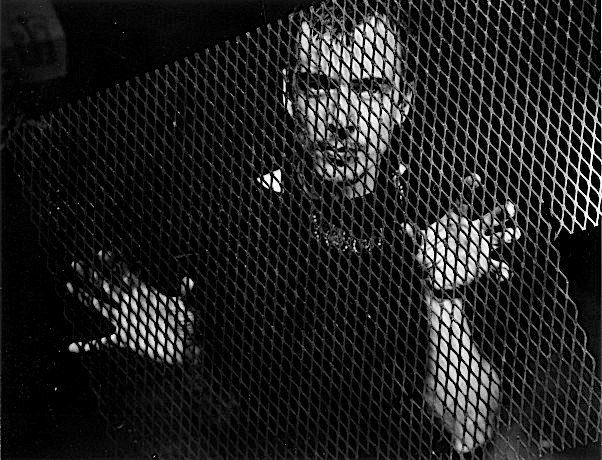
- Skip Arnold (photograph by Christopher Flach)
- Born: July 12, 1957 (age 68); Binghamton, New York, U.S.
- Education: University of California, Los Angeles; State University College at Buffalo
- Known for: Performance art Video art
- Notable work: Closet Corner (1987); A Sculpture in a Fountain (1988); Hood Ornament (1992); On Display (1993)
- Awards: John Simon Guggenheim Memorial Foundation Fellowship, 1995; National Endowment for the Arts, Visual Arts Fellowship Grant, 1993; Art Matters Inc., Fellowship for Performance, 1992

Skip Arnold (born July 12, 1957) is an American contemporary artist who lives and works in Paris, France.

== Life ==
Arnold was born in Binghamton, New York in 1957. He studied art at State University College at Buffalo in New York, receiving a BFA in 1980; and subsequently received a MFA in art and film from University of California, Los Angeles in 1984 (working under Chris Burden, Charles Ray, and Shirley Clarke. He lived and worked in Los Angeles from 1980 until 2017. From 1997 to 2017 he taught studio arts at Art Center College of Design, Pasadena. He has had solo exhibitions at Kunsthalle Wien, Vienna; the University of Houston; the Laguna Art Museum, Laguna Beach; and Exit Art, New York, among others. He has participated in group exhibitions at the Orange County Museum of Art, Newport Beach, CA; the Getty Museum, Los Angeles; Human Resources, Los Angeles, CA; MoMA PS1, Long Island City, NY; the Los Angeles County Museum of Art; ICALA, the Louisiana Museum of Art, Humblebæk, Denmark; and Secession, Vienna; and he has received awards and grants from the John Simon Guggenheim Memorial Foundation, the National Endowment for the Arts, and Art Matters, among others.

== Work ==
Arnold is best known for performance art actions in which he seeks to become an object named in the title of each work. For example, by loosely approximating the shape or style of a given object – usually but not always a sculptural artefact or architectural feature – Arnold has sought to resemble: a scarecrow in Scare Crow (Conklin Forks, New York, 1986), a closet in Closet Corner (Los Angeles, 1987), a sculpture in a fountain in A Sculpture in a Fountain (Los Angeles, 1988), a hood ornament in Hood Ornament (Sun Valley, California, 1992), a gargoyle in Gargoyle (Los Angeles, 1992), a statue in Statue (Los Angeles, 1993), an appendage (to a telephone pole) in Appendage (Los Angeles, 1993), part of a marquee in Marquee or the façade of a building in Façade (Geneva, 1996), or is shipped as freight from Austria to Germany in Freight (Linz to Cologne, 1993). Such works are not simply pranks: they suggest a structural difficulty in the process of a person appearing to become a thing, or a body becoming a sculpture.

Arnold also makes video art works, including performances for camera, and short playful pieces that resemble skits, pranks or TV advertisements. Representative video works include Punch (1984), a video-sculpture that shows a 15-second loop of Arnold being punched hard in the gut and falling through the frames of two stacked monitors; the Activities Made for TV series (1983-1992) that involve him undertaking simple actions such as barking at a concealed dog in Antagination (1976), rolling his head along Saint Patrick's Wall in Roll (1986), or eating an olive in an X-ray machine in Skip Eats an Olive (1984); and the more recent Whipping series (2017), in which Arnold spins in circles with outstretched arms, and has edited the video such that his body resembles a ceiling fan.

Other works involved Arnold undertaking durational tasks in public, such as navigating the Bermuda Triangle in B. T. Exploration (1996), funded by a prestigious Guggenheim Fellowship; being installed underneath a sheet of glass at the entrance to the Basel Art Fair such that visitors had to walk over him to enter the event (Gruezi, 2002); being installed wrapped in plastic in a public square in Slovakia (An Occurrence at Nove Zámky, 2002); or taking eight-hour showers daily for four days in a hotel room during the Gramercy International Art Fair (Shower, 1997).

Arnold also engages in long-term project-based works, for example Truffle Hunt (1998), a collaboration with artists Jason Rhoades and Hans Weigand. It was originally conceived for Rhoades’s International Museum Project About Leaving and Arriving (I.M.P.A.L.A.), and involved Arnold, Rhoades, and Weigand journeying to Italy via Switzerland in search of truffles; in its exhibited form at ICALA in 2018 (January 28-April 8), it included maps of their journey to different locations in the countryside, Polaroids, video clips, and related ephemera, as well as one of the truffles smuggled back to Los Angeles by the artists, installed on a turntable.

In a widely reproduced manifesto, first published in 1993, Arnold has stated:

The emphasis is on space and how/what my body does or can do. The work ranges from being extremely physical to extremely passive.
To explore the relationships between self, place, and particular time.
To explore fundamental gestures and concepts.
My interest is the image and nothing else.
I work in media that are evanescent, transient, consumed in passing, not collected.
What is common to all my work is "Skip." Skip is the artwork. The act of doing, my actions, my choices.

His works are often comedic or slapstick in tone, or may appear violent or reckless. His work resembles the work of fellow performance and multimedia artists associated with Los Angeles including Paul McCarthy, Mike Kelley, Kim Jones, Eleanor Antin, Bruce Nauman, Bas Jan Ader, or Chris Burden, as well as the often-humorous work of some Conceptual artists such as Jeffrey Vallance and John Baldessari. His work has been shown alongside many such artists, including in the major video art retrospective California Video: Artists and Histories at the J. Paul Getty Museum in 2008.
