= Adriana Corral =

American sculptor

- Born: 1983 (age 42–43); El Paso, Texas
- Education: The University of Texas at Austin
- Known for: Installation, performance, sculpture
- Awards: The Joan Mitchell Foundation Emerging Artist Grant, The MacDowell Colony Grant, and The National Association of Latino Arts and Culture Grant
- Website: adrianacorral.com

Adriana Corral (born 1983) is an American artist born in El Paso, Texas, who focuses on installation, performance, and sculpture. Her artwork often emphasizes themes of memory, contemporary human rights violations, and under-examined historical narratives. Corral completed her B.F.A. at the University of Texas at El Paso in 2008 and her M.F.A. at the University of Texas at Austin in 2013. Her work has been exhibited at the Betty Moody Gallery, Houston, Boulder Museum of Contemporary Art, Mexic-Arte Museum in Austin, Texas, Blue Star Contemporary in San Antonio, Texas, the McNay Art Museum, and Massachusetts Museum of Contemporary Art. She has received a series of awards recognizing her work including The Joan Mitchell Foundation Emerging Artist Grant, The MacDowell Colony Grant, and The National Association of Latino Arts and Culture Grant.

== Early life and education ==
Adriana Corral was born in El Paso, Texas in 1983. In her 2016 presentation for U.S. Latinx Arts Futures Symposium, Corral spoke about her early interest in art, specifically the Spanish artist Francisco Goya's The Third of May 1808. According to Corral, at an early age, this piece "awakened an awareness of the vicious realities of injustices." Corral's own work often focuses on the experiences of individuals who have been ignored in mainstream histories, like the victims of femicides in Ciudad Juárez and braceros who were mistreated on U.S. soil during the mid-twentieth century.

Corral's early years were also influenced by her access to her family's medical practice. In 4x4: Artist Q+A, a video series produced by Walley Films, Corral said, "I've had a deep love for medicine and for the arts as well, and I feel that they are really interlaced." At an early age, her aunt encouraged her to pursue medicine as a tangible way to help people. Corral concluded that the arts, too, could help people and established a path toward a career in the arts.

Corral earned a Bachelor of Fine Arts from The University of Texas at El Paso in 2008 and her Master of Fine Arts from University of Texas at Austin in 2013. Today, Corral's artwork often takes up themes related to heath, such as the inhumane use of cyanide-based insecticides on guest workers entering the country to participate in the Bracero program. Corral identifies artist Teresita Fernández as a key influence on her work.

== Career ==
=== Residencies and awards ===
Corral's artwork has been recognized regionally, nationally, and internationally. She received the Roy Crane Award for Outstanding Creative Achievement in the Visual Arts in 2013, the MacDowell Colony Grant (2014), the National Association of Latino Arts and Culture Grant in 2014, the Joan Mitchell Foundation Emerging Artist Grant in 2015 and the Joan Mitchell Foundation Artist-in-Residence in 2018, the Künstlerhaus Bethanien Residency in Berlin in 2016, International Artist-in-Residence at Artpace in 2016, and the Artadia Award in 2019. Corral was invited to speak at the Ford Foundation's 2016 U.S. Latinx Arts Futures Symposium. Corral was a 2017 fellow at Black Cube, a Nomadic Art Museum, during which time she produced and installed Unearthed: Desenterrado (on view March 9–June 9, 2018).

=== Exhibitions ===
Corral's 2020 solo exhibition Line as Human/Línea como concepto humano was held at the Betty Moody Gallery in Houston, Texas. The title of the show was inspired by a text written in the 1960s by the artist Gego. Corral's Unearthed: Desenterrado was exhibited at the Staniar Gallery at Washington and Lee University and the Boulder Museum of Art, Boulder, Colorado. Corral's Sous Rature: Under Erasure was exhibited in 2016 at Artpace in San Antonio, Texas. Her first major solo exhibition, Voces de las Perdidas: Voices of the Lost was held at Mexic-Arte Museum in Austin in 2011.

In 2024, her work was featured in Xican-a.o.x. Body, a comprehensive exhibition on the contributions of Chicano artists to contemporary culture at the Pérez Art Museum Miami, Florida.

Corral's work has been exhibited in a variety of group exhibitions including the Pérez Art Museum Miami, New Orleans Museum of Art, Los Angeles Contemporary Exhibitions, Krannert Art Museum, Three Walls Gallery, Chicago, Illinois, University of Arizona Museum of Art, Blue Star Contemporary, and the McNay Art Museum.

== Artwork ==
=== Work focused on femicides in Ciudad Juárez (2010-2017) ===
While completing her M.F.A at the University of Texas at Austin, Corral began to create work about the victims of femicides in Ciudad Juárez. Femicides are classified as gender-based murders, which often involve sexual assault. Perpetrators are rarely apprehended or punished and therefore the exact number of victims is difficult to calculate. In Voces de las Perdidas (Voices of the lost) (2010), Corral produced a site-specific installation in which she hung hundreds of ceramic body bag tags that she created from soil collected at the crime site of Campo Algodonero in Cd. Juarez. On each tag, she wrote the names of individual victims in an effort to acknowledge their identities. Though the bodies of many women were abandoned at this site, the remains of eight women were identified (Esmeralda Herrera Monreal, Laura Berenice Ramos Monárrez, Claudia Ivette González, María de los Ángeles Acosta Ramírez, Mayra Juliana Reyes Solís, Merlín Elizabeth Rodríguez Sáenz, and María Rocina Galicia) and named as a part of the landmark case presented to the Inter-American Court of Human Rights. In her 2011 performance piece Quebrar el Silencio (Break the Silence), Corral smashed four hundred and fifty ceramic body bag tags, symbolizing the impossibility of fully reclaiming the voices of the victims of femicide.

Corral pursued notions of silence surrounding the murders of women in several other bodies of work produced between 2010 and 2017, including Campo Algodón, Ciudad Juarez, 21 de Febrero del 2007 (2011), Per Legem Terrae (2014), Impunidad, Circulo Vicioso (2015) Sous Rature, 'Under Erasure' (2016), and The Trace of a Living Document (2017).

=== Unearthed: Desenterrado (2018) ===
Corral's monumental flag Unearthed: Desenterrado was installed along the U.S./Mexico border at the Rio Vista Farm in Socorro, Texas, which is the site of a former Bracero program processing center. An all-cotton white flag flew on a 60-foot-high flag pole over the site for three months, which is the life expectancy of cotton flags. An American bald eagle and a Mexican golden eagle (designed by Corral's collaborator Vincent Valdez) are embroidered on opposite sides of the flag, symbolizing the fraught bi-national Bracero Agreement (1942), the largest foreign guest worker program ever established at that time. In her artist statement, Corral states that the work commemorates the Mexican men who worked on U.S. farms and built its railroads, while also acknowledging human rights violations against the workers. At processing centers like Rio Vista, braceros were doused in dangerous chemicals including cyanide-based chemicals and kerosene as part of a delousing process meant to stop the spread of smallpox. Corral contends, "Framing the process as 'cleasing' justified the use of pesticides through science and medicine." Corral collaborated with a number of scholars to create the piece, including historians David Dorado Romo, Yolanda Chávez Leyva, and Sehila Mota Casper.

Subject to the Texas sun and wind, the flag slowly deteriorated over time. The exhibition was curated by Cortney Lane Stell for Black Cube a Nomadic Art Museum. In her essay for the Staniar Gallery catalogue Adriana Corral's Unearthed: Desenterrado, Stell notes that the cotton references the fields around the Rio Vista Farm, where cotton was grown and harvested by braceros. According to Stell, the unravelling of the flag was a "metaphor for both the fragility of the human body and the transience of memory, referencing the harsh treatment of braceros at Rio Vista Farm and their forgotten history." After its original installation in Socorro, Texas, Unearthed: Desenterrado was exhibited at the Staniar Gallery at Washington and Lee University and the Boulder Museum of Art, Boulder, Colorado.

=== Requiem (2016-2018) ===
Part of the Massachusetts Museum of Contemporary Art exhibition Suffering from Realness, Requiem consists of a monumental bronze representation of a dying golden eagle. The piece was a site-specific collaboration with the artist Vincent Valdez. According to Denise Markonish, who curated Suffering from Realness, "A requiem is a mass for the souls of the dead, and here Corral and Valdez have used it to take stock of American History, beginning by asking 243 Americans (a number marking the age of the American Republic in 2019) to each submit a date of personal or historical significance. These dates were burned by Corral, and the ash was used by Valdez to patina a bronze sculpture of an American bald eagle in distress. Each of the collected dates was then laboriously cut and carved directly into the sheetrock wall by Corral, literally scarring the museum with American history, creating both an urn and a time capsule." Each of the 243 participants also submitted explanatory texts, which were all exhibited in a key alongside the wall. Together, the texts combined to create a people's history of the United States. Other dates with significance to the artists are also included in the key. For example, "242. April 4, 2019: Requiem completed, a three-year project."

The bronze eagle and 243 dates were exhibited alongside Valdez's The Beginning is Near, Part II: Dream Baby Dream (2018). When the exhibition opened, Valdez and Corral organized a performance in which pall bearers processed Requiem to its installation site while a mariachi band (with Valdez on trumpet) accompanied the procession.

=== Eyes of the Skin, Lehmann Maupin (2022) ===
Corrals's work was included in Eyes of the Skin, a group exhibition mounted between June 9 – August 12, 2022 at Lehmann Maupin. The exhibition was curated by New York City-based artist Teresita Fernández, who was represented by Lehmann Maupin at the time. According to the exhibition website, the show was aimed toward "pushing back against the dominance of the eye and the biased hierarchies of visual art history." Instead, the exhibition was intended to focus on "the role of the body as the locus of perception" and emphasized "the importance of indigenous, intuitive, and somatic knowledge as a primary source for understanding our world." The gallery produced a "microsite" to provide additional information and to archive the exhibition. About Corral's work, the site reveals that her work entitled A Pamplisest (2022) on view (a series of six panels, ink, lithographic crayon, pen, and NARA documents transferred onto gesso board panels), reveals the "political targeting of Mexican immigrants as contagious carriers for disease and the subsequent creation of an atmosphere of racialized paranoia in California, Texas, and the Southwest—a sentiment that public officials capitalized on to implement harsher border-control policies." In this group show, Corral's work was exhibited alongside works by Francheska Alcántara, Carolina Caycedo, David Antonio Cruz, Kira Dominguez Hultgren, Leslie Martinez, Glendalys Medina, and Jeffrey Meris, and Esteban Ramón Pérez.
