= Anindita Dutta =

Indian-born, US-based artist (born 1973)

- Born: April 20, 1973 (age 53); Purnia, Bihar, India
- Citizenship: India
- Education: Ranchi University (Bachelor of Arts, 1994); Visva-Bharati University (Bachelor of Arts, 1999); Purdue University (Master of Arts, 2003); University of Iowa (Master of Fine Arts, 2005); Skowhegan School of Painting and Sculpture
- Known for: Performance art, sculptures, installations
- Website: aninditadutta.com

Anindita Dutta (born April 20, 1973) is an Indian sculptor, installation, and performance artist, based in New Haven, Connecticut, United States. She primarily works with wet clay, incorporating repurposed materials such as clothing and textiles, to explore themes of gender, fragility, mortality, and impermanence.

== Early life and education ==
Anindita Dutta was born on April 20, 1973, in Purnia, Bihar, in northern India near the India–Nepal border. Growing up in a region where clay was a ubiquitous part of the environment, she developed an early affinity for the material, which later became a central element of her artistic practice.

Dutta pursued her initial education in India, earning a Bachelor of Arts (Honours) degree in history in 1994 from Ranchi University, located in Ranchi, Jharkhand. She then completed a Bachelor of Fine Arts degree in sculpture and art history in 1999 at Visva-Bharati University, located in Shantiniketan, West Bengal, an institution known for its emphasis on holistic and culturally rooted artistic training.

Dutta’s academic journey continued in the United States, where she earned a Master of Arts degree in sculpture and ceramics in 2003 from Purdue University, located in West Lafayette, Indiana. This was followed by a Master of Fine Arts degree in sculpture in 2005 from the University of Iowa, located in Iowa City, Iowa. That same year, she attended the Skowhegan School of Painting and Sculpture, located in Madison, Maine, further honing her interdisciplinary approach.

== Career ==
Dutta’s career is marked by her innovative use of wet clay, a medium she describes as "direct" and "universal", allowing her to express emotions and ideas with immediacy. Her performances, often involving her own body or collaborators covered in clay, blur the boundaries between human and material, exploring life, death, and transformation.

She has participated in numerous artist residencies, including the Fukuoka Asian Art Museum (Japan, 2010), NXTHVN (New Haven, Connecticut, U.S.), KHOJ Kolkata International Workshop (India, 2006), Art Omi International Art Center (2006), and Sackler Foundation, Brazil (2006), which have shaped her global perspective.

Her work is held in collections including the Arthur M. Sackler Museum of Art and Archaeology at Peking University (Beijing, China) and the Fukuoka Asian Art Museum (Fukuoka, Japan).

Dutta's exhibitions span continents, with notable solo and group shows in New York, Beijing, New Delhi, and Fukuoka. Her 2014 exhibition MAYA at the Arthur M. Sackler Museum and her performance Everything Ends and Everything Matters at the India Art Fair (2014) earned critical acclaim for their emotional depth and monumental scale.

== Selected works ==
Dutta's work includes sculptures, installations, and performances, with wet clay as a recurring medium. Her notable works include:

- The Shadows of Duality (2025) – a solo exhibition at the Sylvia Wald and Po Kim Gallery, New York, featuring sculptures made from repurposed materials such as shoes, handbags, and fabric. The exhibition explored memory, femininity, and contradiction
- Limitation (2015) – a performance and digital print series, capturing Dutta's meditative engagement with clay, exhibited at Latitude 28, New Delhi
- Hourglass (2014) – a massive clay installation, acquired by the Arthur M. Sackler Museum of Art and Archaeology at Peking University; measuring 84 feet in length, it explores themes of life and death and was featured in the 6th Beijing International Art Biennale (2015)
- MAYA (Illusion) (2014) – an exhibition featuring two large-scale clay sculptures, one permanent (Hourglass) and one temporary, performed live at the Arthur M. Sackler Museum; the temporary work, involving clay-covered clothes and a bicycle, embodied the transient nature of life
- Knitting Memories (2013) – a performance documented in Indiana, U.S., using clay and textiles to explore memory and loss
- The Exit (2009) – a fiberglass and hand-stitched fabric sculpture, reflecting Dutta’s use of repurposed materials to address human experiences

== Exhibitions ==
=== Selected solo exhibitions ===
- Shadows of Duality, solo show (2025) at The Sylvia Wald and Po Kim Gallery, New York
- Everything Ends and Everything Matters (2015), Latitude 28, New Delhi, India

=== Selected group exhibitions ===
- The Now: Materiality (2025), Pen + Brush Gallery, New York City, New York, U.S.
- 2024 Art + Politics, AICON Gallery, New York
- 2023 RECLAMATION, NXTHVN culmination at Sean Kelly Gallery, New York
- MAYA (2014), Arthur M. Sackler Museum of Art and Archaeology, Beijing, China
- Dhaka Art Summit 2014, Latitude 28, Dhaka, Bangladesh
- All About Fukuoka (2010), Fukuoka Asian Art Museum, Fukuoka, Japan
