= Random Institute =

- Established: 2007
- Founder: Sandino Scheidegger; Luca Müller
- Purpose: New Exhibition Formats
- Location(s): Müllerstrasse 57; Zürich, Switzerland
- Website: randominstitute.org

Random Institute is a non-profit art institution based in Zürich, Switzerland, that is devoted to researching new exhibition formats. Since 2007 they have produced over 70 exhibitions, events, publications and field research in Europe, Asia, North America, Africa and the Atlantic Ocean. New exhibition formats included works by established artists such as Richard Long, James Lee Byars, Cory Arcangel, Zilvinas Kempinas, Guido van der Werve, Bethan Huws, Eva and Franco Mattes, Carey Young, Julian Charrière, Federico Herrero, as well as many emerging artists.

For the art center Despacio (San José, Costa Rica) Random Institute has since 2015 directed various exhibitions, including with works by artists such as Allora & Calzadilla, Luis Camnitzer, Alfredo Jaar, Regina José Galindo, Teresa Margolles, Rivane Neuenschwander and Liliana Porter. Solo exhibitions were organized for artists such as Aníbal López, Julian Charrière, Florence Jung and many more.

Random Institute founded 2019 the non-profit organisation Social Income.

== History ==
Random Institute was founded in January 2007 by Sandino Scheidegger and Luca Müller. The organization's goal is to research new exhibition formats and support artistic initiatives that explores notions of exhibition-making as a form of artistic practice.

For the same reason, the organization co-founded 2013 the contemporary art center Réunion in Zürich and Kunsthalle Tropical in Iceland, which has been the site of numerous expositions initiated by Random Institute. From 2016 until 2019 Random Institute has been collaborating and programming the non-profit arts center Despacio in San José, Costa Rica.

== Lectures and talks ==
Random Institute has given various lectures and talks at institutions, amongst others, at the Zurich University of the Arts, School of Visual Arts NYC, F+F School for Art and Media Design Zurich or Universidad San Francisco de Quito; and presented uncommon exhibition models at art fairs such as ARCO (Lisbon) or during the Art Basel Talks at ArteBA (Buenos Aires).

== Financial transparency ==
Furthermore, Random Institute sought to promote financial transparency among not-for-profit arts organizations by publishing records of its financial transactions online between 2014 and 2017.

== Curatorial activities (selection) ==
A non-exhaustive list of curatorial initiatives by Random Institute:

- All The Lights We Cannot See (2016) in Pyongyang, North Korea
- Consider Yourself Invited (2015) at the Belluard Festival, Fribourg
- One-Night Stand (2015) at the zurich moves! Festival by Tanzhaus Zürich.
- Don't Talk to Strangers (2014/15) took place in New York and Zürich (co-curated with Nicola Ruffo)
- Things May Get Out of hand (2014) with Florence Jung in Paris. During the opening 11 visitors got kidnapped.
- James Lee Byars (2014) Solo show of James Lee Byars at Réunion, Zürich. (co-curated with Andreas Wagner) The exhibition takes up a legend of Byars' 1978 exhibition at the Kunsthalle Bern.
- First Day of Good Weather – Latin American Art (2016) group show with artists such as Allora & Calzadilla, Luis Camnitzer, Alfredo Jaar, Regina José Galindo, Aníbal López, Teresa Margolles, Rivane Neuenschwander and Liliana Porter at Sies + Höke, Düsseldorf.

== Publishing activities (selection) ==
A non-exhaustive list of different publications by Random Institute:

- Disappearing Museums; publication about non-functional architecture by Random Institute, 2018.
- The Pyongyang Times; edited by Anna Hugo & Sandino Scheidegger, published by Mark Pezinger Verlag Press, 2016.
- Don’t Talk to Strangers; edited by Sandino Scheidegger & Nicola Ruffo, published by Kodoji Press, 2015. ISBN 978-3-03747-040-4
- Four Illustrated Stories; edited by Alejandro Cesarco & Christoph Schifferli, published by Random Institute and Kunstverein, Zürich 2015
- Without the Viewer; edited by Sandino Scheidegger, published by Distressed Securities & Books Ltd., Bermuda 2010
- Sometimes Attention Should Be Paid to the Absence of Everything; edited by Sandino Scheidegger & illustrated by Johanna Schaible, ISBN 978-3-03303-867-7
