= Vincent Valdez =

American artist (born 1977)

- Born: 1977 (age 48–49); San Antonio, Texas
- Education: Rhode Island School of Design
- Known for: Painting, drawing
- Awards: The Joan Mitchell Foundation Artist in Residency, Blue Star Contemporary Berlin Residency/Kunstlerhaus Bethanien, Houston Artadia Award, Studio Fellow at NXTHVN
- Website: https://www.vincentvaldezstudio.com/

Vincent Valdez (born 1977) is an American artist. Primarily focused on painting, drawing, and printmaking, his artwork is representational and frequently engages in portraiture. His art emphasizes themes of social justice, memory, and under-examined historical narratives.

Valdez completed a Bachelor of Fine Arts at the Rhode Island School of Design in 2000. He lives and works in Houston, Texas, and spends considerable time in Los Angeles. Valdez is represented by the David Shelton Gallery (Houston) and Matthew Brown Gallery (Los Angeles). His work has been exhibited at the Museum of Fine Arts, Houston, Ford Foundation, Los Angeles County Museum of Art, Smithsonian American Art Museum, The National Portrait Gallery (United States), Blanton Museum of Art, Parsons School of Design, Clark Art Institute, and the Fundacion Osde Buenos Aires.

In 2024, he had a mid-career survey exhibition titled "Vincent Valdez: Just a Dream..." at the Contemporary Art Museum, Houston and MASSMoCA in North Adams. He received a MacArthur Fellowship in 2026.

== Early life and education ==
=== Early years ===
Valdez was born in the South Side of San Antonio, Texas in 1977. Valdez's interests in art emerged at an early age. He regarded himself as an outsider, and his work has been preserved since he was three. At age nine, he took up mural painting under the mentorship of Alex Rubio, another young San Antonio artist. Under Rubio's direction, Valdez worked on a series of murals; the first was located at the former site of the Esperanza Peace and Justice Center in San Antonio. Later, Rubio and Valdez worked side-by-side to complete murals under the auspices of the Community Cultural Arts program.

=== Education and early work ===
After graduating from Burbank High School, Valdez enrolled in art school in Florida, but shortly thereafter transferred to the Rhode Island School of Design (RISD) on a full scholarship. He completed his B.F.A. there in 2000. He had his first solo exhibition at the Guadalupe Cultural Arts Center's Theater Gallery in San Antonio in his last year at RISD. During Valdez's junior year at RISD, an elderly self-surrogate in his painting Remembering (1999) reflects his experience of "missing home," which contributed to his developing Chicano consciousness. His senior project at RISD culminated in his iconic piece Kill the Pachuco Bastard! (2000), which was influenced by the beginning of the film American Me (1992, dir. Edward James Olmos). The painting depicts the 1943 Zoot Suit riots, when sailors, servicemen, and other authorities in Los Angeles attacked Mexican Americans and tore off their Zoot Suits.

Acquired by entertainer and arts collector and advocate Cheech Marin, the piece was exhibited as part of Cheech's Chicano Visions: American Painters on the Verge, which traveled to twelve venues from 2001 to 2007, including San Antonio Museum of Art (SAMA), the National Hispanic Cultural Center in Albuquerque, the Indiana State Museum, Museum of Contemporary Art, La Jolla, and the De Young Museum in San Francisco. In a review of the SAMA exhibition, it was deemed "the show's edgiest work," one in which "rapacious sailors... violate every Chicano body and cultural emblem with unremitting barbarity. The painting is remarkable for: the dynamic expressiveness and superb characterizations of its varied protagonists, the lurid lighting effects, the complex space (including a tile floor that 'rolls' like waves on an ocean) and the undeniable mastery that makes it possible to pack such dense (and meaningful) iconographic details into a compelling, clearly legible narrative." The painting was showcased in "Cheech Collects," the inaugural permanent collection exhibition of The Cheech Marin Center for Chicano Art, Culture & Industry in Riverside, Ca, where a reviewer called it an exhibition highlight.

His three versions of I Lost Her to El Diablo (2001–2004) reflect an interest in Texas folklore (in the form of the "Devil at the Dance" tale), as well as deepening treatments of psychology and atmosphere in the culminating painting. Valdez continues the "Devil at the Dance" theme in a Day of the Dead context in A Dance with Death (2000), in which "the cold beauty" of the female protagonist is influenced by John Singer Sargent's Madame X, and El Diablo at the Dance (c. 2002) described as "an early masterpiece" by the artist."

== Career ==
=== Residencies and awards ===
Valdez held residencies at Skowhegan School of Painting and Sculpture (2005), The Vermont Studio Center (2011), the Blue Star Contemporary Berlin Residency/Kunstlerhaus Bethanien (2014), and The Joan Mitchell Foundation Artist in Residency (2018). He is a 2015 recipient of The Joan Mitchell Foundation Grant for Painters and Sculptors. In 2015, he earned The Texas Commission on the Arts State Artist Award. Artadia named Valdez and his collaborator Adriana Corral as the 2019 Houston Award Winners.

Valdez was a 2020 Studio Fellow at NXTHVN, an organization in New Haven, CT founded by Titus Kaphar, Jason Price, and Jonathan Brand, NXTHVN fellowships are designed to foster "intergenerational mentorship, cross-sector collaboration, and local engagement [to] accelerate the careers of the next generation and foster retention of professional art talent." During his fellowship, Valdez exhibited his work in the group show NXTHVN: Un/Common Proximity at James Cohan Gallery in New York, NY with Allana Clarke, Alisa Sikelianos-Carter, Daniel T. Gaitor-Lomack, Jeffrey Meris, Esteban Ramón Pérez, and Ilana Savdie. Un/Common Proximity was curated by 2020-2021 NXTHVN Curatorial Fellow, Claire Kim.

In 2022, Valdez was a finalist and one of seven prizewinners for the Sixth Triennial Outwin Boochever Portrait Competition; he received one of four commendations. He was a 2022 recipient of the Mellon and Ford Foundation's Latinx Artist Fellowship. He received the Arion Press' initial King Residency in 2023, and in 2025, he became one of the ACLU of Texas' 2025-2026 Artists-in-Residence. Pablo José Ramírez judged "Just a Dream" as the #2 exhibition of 2025 in Artforum. The Alamo Colleges District selected Valdez to be its inaugural Artist-in-Residence for 2025–2026. In 2026 he was awarded a MacArthur Fellows Program "Genius Grant."

=== Exhibitions ===
Valdez has shown his work in a number of solo exhibitions throughout the United States, including venues Mass MoCA, The University of Texas Austin's Blanton Museum of Art, The University of Houston's Blaffer Art Museum, Artpace in San Antonio, The David Winton Bell Gallery at Brown University, Washington and Lee University's Staniar Gallery, The McNay Art Museum, San Antonio, The Mesa Contemporary Arts Center, The Snite Museum of Art at Notre Dame University, the University of Texas A&M, Laredo, the Richard E. Peeler Art Center at DePaul University, and the Dallas Contemporary.

Valdez has shown his work in a number of group exhibitions at venues including The Los Angeles County Museum of Art, The National Portrait Gallery, Washington, DC, Vincent Price Art Museum, Los Angeles, California, The Minnesota Museum of Art, St. Paul, Minnesota, The Phoenix Art Museum, Phoenix, Arizona, Crystal Bridges Museum of American Art, North Carolina Museum of Art, The Albuquerque Museum of Art, The National Museum of Mexican Art, Chicago, The Frye Art Museum, Seattle, and the Parsons School of Design, Paris, France.

=== Permanent collections ===
Valdez's work is included in the following permanent collections: Modern Art Museum of Fort Worth Permanent Collection, The Ford Foundation Permanent Collection, The Blanton Museum of Art Permanent Collection, The Museum of Fine Arts Houston Permanent Collection, The Bell Gallery/Brown University Permanent Collection, The Linda Pace Foundation Permanent Collection, ArtPace Permanent Collection, The Arkansas Drawing Center Permanent Collection, The McNay Museum of Art Permanent Collection, The National Museum of Mexican Art Permanent Collection, The Frye Art Museum Permanent Collection, The Raclin Murphy Museum of Art Permanent Collection, The University of Houston Public Art Collection, The Museum of Texas Tech University Public Art Collection, The San Antonio Museum of Art Permanent Collection, and The Cheech Marin Center for Chicano Art, Culture & Industry.

== Artwork ==
=== Made Men, 2003 ===
The Made Men series was first exhibited in San Antonio. It was featured with The Strangest Fruit series at Brown University's David Winton Bell Gallery (2013). It also appeared in his "Just A Dream" exhibition in 2024–25. The series consists of four large pastels, which represent three masculine archetypes, a boxer, a soldier, and a martyr, men who are used and discarded by society. The fourth man, a street kid, seeks to escape their stereotypic roles and achieve liberation. The series was partly inspired by Bob Dylan's song "I Shall be Released."

=== Expulsion From the Great City, 2002 ===
Expulsion features a monumental modern-day Adam and Eve, who are stripped nude and forced from a great metropolis visible in the background. Valdez regards the pastel as part of the "Made Men" series.

=== Stations, 2004 ===
At 26, Valdez was the youngest artist to be awarded a solo exhibition at the McNay Art Museum in San Antonio, Texas. Stations emphasizes the physical dangers of the sport as it guides the viewer through one exhausting night in the life of a boxer. The series title, as well as the imagery, connects it to the passion of Christ in the form of the Stations of the Cross. The themes are intertwined, and together they narrate the story of the "underdog."

Stations was exhibited at the McNay Art Museum in 2004 and The Mesa Contemporary Arts Center, Mesa, AZ in 2010, and selections appear in "Just a Dream..."

=== El Chavez Ravine, 2009 ===
El Chavez Ravine represents a collaborative effort between Valdez and the musician Ryland Peter "Ry" Cooder, who conceived of the project. Cooder had Duke's So. Cal construct a 1953 Chevy Good Humor ice cream truck out of old parts. He enlisted Valdez to paint the historical narrative of the locale over the entire surface of the truck. The painting elucidates the story of Los Angeles's historically Mexican community, Chavez Ravine. Deemed the "worst slum in the city," the land was seized from Chavez Ravine homeowners using eminent domain and funds from the Housing Act of 1949. Though the neighborhood was demolished to make way for the Elysian Park Heights public housing project, the new high rise housing complex was never constructed, due to the Red Scare, which led to opposition to public housing. Instead the land was sold to Brooklyn Dodgers owner Walter O'Malley for the construction of Dodger Stadium. Valdez's painting illustrates the inhumane treatment of Chavez Ravine residents and also showcases their resistance against the seizure of their land. One side of the truck illustrates the idealized community, the other side shows forcible displacement. The roof depicts a monstrous-looking bulldozer flinging bodies and cars in the air. On the hood, a baseball game is taking place while, on the left, displaced residents inhabit the ruins of their partially destroyed houses. Valdez and Cooder are depicted (from behind) in the center of the hood as observers.

Cooder's 2005 album, Chávez Ravine also recognizes the Chavez Ravine residents. In "3rd Base, Dodger Stadium," the fourteenth track on the album, Cooder's lyrics memorialize the community's historical link to the Chavez Ravine neighborhood: "I work here nights, parking cars, underneath the moon and stars / The same ones that we all knew back in 1952 / And if you want to know where a local boy like me is coming from: "3rd base, Dodger Stadium." Valdez's El Chavez Ravine painting wraps around the kind of ice cream truck that circulated in all areas of the city, including the Chavez Ravine neighborhood in 1953. Valdez discussed the piece: "This became an epic project for me, not only because of the time I invested into it, but because it is the only lowrider that I know of that is painted by hand with a brush and artist oil paints. Most importantly, I also felt like somewhat of an archeologist digging up a lost history that isn't in the textbooks."

El Chavez Ravine was exhibited at The San Antonio Museum of Art in 2009 and it is in "Just a Dream."

=== Excerpts for John, 2011–2012 ===
Excerpts for John is a series of monochromatic paintings that illustrate a U.S. military funeral procession. The paintings are complemented with a film showing a casket draped in an American flag ethereally floating through San Antonio neighborhoods. As the title suggests, the series is dedicated to Valdez's friend, John. Valdez said, "This suite of paintings pays homage to my lifelong friend, 2nd Lt. John R. Holt Jr., (1978–2009) who survived a tour of duty in Iraq as a combat medic, but lost a battle with post-traumatic stress disorder in 2009. The varied backgrounds remain anonymous to the viewer, but depict the neighborhood that John and I grew up in."

Excerpts for John was exhibited at the McNay Art Museum in San Antonio, Texas in 2011. Selections from the series were exhibited at the Smithsonian National Portrait Gallery as part of the 2017 exhibition The Face of Battle: Americans at War 9/11-Present. A selection of Excerpts for John was also exhibited as part of the Los Angeles County Museum of Art Pacific Standard Time LA/LA 2017 exhibition Home—So Different, So Appealing. It is also in "Just a Dream."

=== The Strangest Fruit, 2013 ===
The Strangest Fruit series consists of about a dozen paintings that feature Mexican and Mexican American men dressed in contemporary clothing and suspended from invisible nooses. The title of the series was inspired by Billie Holiday's famous 1939 song "Strange Fruit", which was adapted from Abel Meeropol's anti-lynching poem written in 1936. The Strangest Fruit series evokes a little known history of the lynching of Mexicans and Mexican Americans in the United States. Historians William Carrigan and Clive Webb have documented 547 cases of extralegal executions of people of Mexican origin or descent in states like Texas, California, and New Mexico, but suspect that the actual number of victims is considerably higher. In Valdez's series, each man is juxtaposed against a white background meant to symbolize forgotten histories and erased narratives of racialized violence against Mexicans and Mexican Americans. Juan Cartagena, the President and General Counsel of LatinoJustice PRLDEF notes that Valdez's The Strangest Fruit series "expertly juxtaposes the infamous symbol of state-sponsored/state ignored violence—here the visualized but invisible noose—with the bodies of young Latino men in modern attire." In his artist statement, Valdez enumerates these modern day threats as mass incarceration, the for-profit prison industry, the criminalization of poverty, biased justice systems, racial profiling, and mass deportation.

The Strangest Fruit series was exhibited at Brown University's David Winton Bell Gallery (2013), Artpace in San Antonio (2014), and Washington and Lee University's Staniar Gallery (2014). Selections from the series were exhibited as part of Crystal Bridges Museum of American Art's 2014 State of the Art exhibition, as well as in "Just a Dream." According to the artist, the paintings allude not only to the lynching nooses, but also to ongoing oppression, which he calls the "invisible noose." The suspension of these bodies between heaven and earth is also meant to be ambiguous—their position could refer to transcendence and release as well as their death by lynching.

=== The Beginning is Near, Part I: The City, 2015–2016 ===
The City I is a 30-foot-long black and white painting featuring fourteen hooded members of the Ku Klux Klan. The artwork was sparked by Philip Guston's City Limits (1969, Museum of Modern Art), which he saw in 2015 exhibition at the Blanton Museum of Art. He recalls: "Immediately I asked myself, how many more generations of American artists will need to tackle subjects like the Klan?" Valdez's painting was also influenced by Gil Scott-Heron's song The Klan, from his 1980 Real Eyes album. The City I is dedicated to Guston and Scott-Heron, bearing the inscription "To PG and GSH" in the lower right. When he was a young artist, Valdez accidentally came face-to-face with a KKK Grand Wizard in front of the Alamo, and this experience had been percolating in the back of his mind for a long time.

An expansive and glowing city stretching out behind the figures provides the title for Valdez's painting. Near center, a hooded toddler wearing baby Nikes points out at the viewer, a reference to James Montgomery Flagg's famous World War I era recruitment poster. It features a pointing Uncle Sam, with the title "I Want You for the U.S. Army." This poster is depicted in Kill The Pachuco Bastards!. On the convergence of Klan imagery and contemporary details such as beer cans, an iPhone, and a modern Chevrolet, Valdez said, "There's a shift happening. Two worlds are being pulled apart, or pulled together. You, as a viewer, are stuck in between. You have to decide who you are, where you are, and how you got there." Valdez also wanted to emphasize that these contemporary klansmen are urban, educated, and affluent, because the klan is not limited to impoverished rural areas.

In March 2016, New York Times writer Lawrence Downes featured Valdez's The City I in an editorial piece. Dowes wrote, "Mr. Valdez was not planning to be prophetic when he began the painting last November. He is not a polemical artist, or a literal-minded one, though his paintings are striking for their attention to emotion, storytelling and the revealing detail. He could not have known how much the Ku Klux Klan, and white supremacy, would overtake the 2016 presidential campaign." The City received widespread coverage throughout Texas when it was first exhibited at the David Shelton Gallery in Houston, TX as part of the solo exhibition The Beginning is Near (Part I).

The paintings were acquired by The Blanton Museum of Art at the University of Texas, Austin and were on view beginning July 17, 2018. The Blanton Museum produced extensive programming to support the exhibition. The opening of the exhibition was covered in the New York Times, The Guardian, and Artnet News. On the evening of the opening, the Blanton Museum of Art hosted a conversation with Valdez and journalist Maria Hinojosa, anchor and executive producer of Latino USA on National Public Radio. In a February 2020 Artnet News piece identifying Valdez as one of four breakout artists from the Los Angeles Art Fairs, the author referenced the controversy surrounding The City I, which the author defines as a "sensationalistically misread painting." The Artnet News author goes on to note that, "Valdez has already been widely embraced by significant museums and art nonprofits, with more honors to come."

The painting is featured prominently in both venues of "Just a Dream." At MASS MoCA, it was placed near the entrance to the museum. Denise Markonish, co-curater of this exhibition, said the placement was "strategic," because "Vincent is unflinching," and "We, as a museum, should be too."

=== The Beginning is Near, Part II: Dream Baby Dream, 2018 ===
In 2019, Valdez exhibited Dream Baby Dream (2018) at MASS MoCA as part of the exhibition Suffering from Realness curated by Denise Markonish. Twelve mostly grayscale oil on paper paintings (42 x 72 inches) focus on the multi-ethnic cast of individuals who attended Muhammad Ali's funeral shortly after his death on June 3, 2016. Each person exhibits varying degrees of grief at the loss of the American icon. In the MASS MoCA exhibition catalog, Markonish notes that each figure is "silent, hesitant, and even uncertain about their willingness to speak." Markonish continues, "This potential muteness serves as an apt metaphor for our troubled times." About the series, Valdez said, "This work reminds me on a daily basis that we are bound by similar patterns of history, experiences, and struggles for survival. Filtering the present through the past presents me with the difficult and private examination of my own tangled history--as a Mexican American in twenty-first-century America. I don't presume that painting can change the world. But, I stand firm in my belief that the artist can still provide critical moments of silence and clarity in times of immense distortion and chaos."

The series is structured as a grid, based The Brady Bunch television show, whose lack of diversity did not match his familial experience. He has, in the words of one commenter, thus "replaced a non-diverse past with a diverse present, one that hopefully points to a diverse future."

Dream Baby Dream was first exhibited at the David Shelton Gallery in Houston in September 2017. At MASS MoCA in 2019, Dream Baby Dream was exhibited alongside Valdez's Requiem (2016–19), a collaborative piece created with Adriana Corral. Valdez and Corral organized a performance to mark the opening of Requiem. The artists processed Requiem, a monumental bronze representation of a dying golden eagle, alongside pall bearers, who carried the weight of the sculpture. A mariachi band accompanied the procession that was inspired by a New Orleans funeral; Valdez played the trumpet. Other artists who participated in Suffering from Realness include Aziz+Cucher, Cassils, Joey Fauerso, Jeffrey Gibson, Hayv Kahraman, Titus Kaphar, Roberto Longo, Christoper Mir, MPA, Wengechi Mutu, Allison Schulnik, Keith Sklar, and Robert Taplin.

Dream, Baby, Dream also appears in "Just a Dream..."

=== People of the Sun, 2018 ===
People of the Sun / El Gente de la Sol (the Santanas), to give the work its full title, depicts the artist's grandparents in front of a clothesline. This photorealist work took three years to complete. Valdez told the New York Times: "It's one of the very, very few paintings that I am content with," He added: "It speaks about the labor and the toil and the determination of creating that better life and situation in America, so that your offspring have a better way forward."

=== So Long, Mary Ann, 2019 ===
Mary Ann is the name of the tattooed man's mother, who died when he was a child. He commemorated her by tattooing her name several times. When considering painting this man, Valdez heard the song "So Long, Marianne" by Leonard Cohen. The two tales of "lost love" are combined in this painting, with the unnamed man's experience of loss as important as Cohen's. A glimmer in the man's eye reflects a cross. So Long, Mary Ann is featured in "Just a Dream..." In Houston, it was located at the entrance to the exhibition.

=== Eaten, 2018–19 ===
Eaten is an installation in which a fat, mutant pig has eaten part of a suit-wearing man from a bygone era. He has also bitten a book. The pig's eyes are those of J. Edgar Hoover, who was the director of the FBI. The slick hair is from Robert S. McNamara, the Secretary of Defense who oversaw the Vietnam War. Its facial skin is based on Steve Bannon, who was an advisor to President Donald S. Trump during his first term. To the artist, these are all villains of sorts, in a work with ambiguous and multiple meanings. Eaten is featured in "Just a Dream...," and a detail of it illustrates the cover of the exhibition catalog.

=== It Was a Very Good Year (Nineteen Eighty-Seven/Eighty-Eight), 2024 ===
It Was a Very Good Year premiered in the Ordinary People: Photorealism and the Work of Art since 1968 exhibition at The Museum of Contemporary Art (MOCA) in Los Angeles in 2024–25. It consists of two monumental paintings. At MOCA, the two paintings were exhibited back-to-back in a separate room. Nineteen Eighty-Seven, features Michael Jordan making his famous 1987 slam-dunk, while Nineteen Eighty-Eight depicts Lieutenant Colonel Oliver North, the public face of the Iran-Contra scandal, in an image that combines his congressional testimony with his office. As one reviewer put it, "the entertainment-industrial complex meets the military-industrial complex." It Was a Very Good Year is featured in Just a Dream's MASS MoCA venue.

=== Supreme, 2022–present ===
Valdez began Supreme on the very day that the Supreme Court overturned Roe v. Wade in 2022. Roe had guaranteed the right to abortion since 1973. The unfinished painting depicts the Supreme Court, along with a monumental statue of Justice, whose head is decapitated. Whereas Justice's blindfold traditionally symbolizes impartiality, here it has been compared to that of an executed prisoner. The presence of John Gast's painting American Progress (1872), a symbol of Manifest Destiny, refers to regressive policies from the past. Supreme, the only unfinished painting Valdez has exhibited, is featured in "Just a Dream..."

=== Documentaries about Valdez's work ===
- 2020: American Masters, In the Making: The Beginning is Near, Filmmaker Ray Santisteban, PBS
- 2013: Vincent Valdez: Excerpts for John, Walley Films
- 2009: A behind the scenes look at the making of at Vincent Valdez "El Chávez Ravine"
- 2009: Vincent Valdez: The Art of Boxing by Ray Santisteban
- 2009: Vincent Valdez: El Chávez Ravine – Research & Painting

=== Oral histories with Valdez ===
- 2005: University of Notre Dame ILS Oral History Project
- 2020: Archives of American Art Pandemic Oral History Project
