= Alex Rubio (artist) =

American mural artist (born 1968)

Alex Rubio (born 1968), who currently uses the name Rubio Rubio, is a San Antonio based muralist, painter, and printmaker. He is also a teacher and youth mentor.

He grew up in the Mirasol housing project on the West Side of the city. Rubio was raised by Guy Rubio, a single mother who worked in a tamale factory, and subsequently as a social worker. She told him: “When there is no work in the fields, in the factories, or in the offices, you will always have work because of your hands.”

== Career ==
When he was 13, Rubio began work with a tattoo artist, and he soon went into the tattoo business independently. Accepting barter as well as cash, he had five bicycles at one time.

Nicknamed El Diablito (the little devil) Rubio painted graffiti-inspired murals in various housing projects. He was engaged by Community Cultural Arts (CCA) to paint walls at the Mirasol Housing project, where he lived. CCA taught him how to paint with brushes. When Rubio was 16, he was put on staff as a CCA designer. Rubio mentored a young Vincent Valdez (b. 1977), who became his muralist partner. The director of a community cultural arts organization hired Rubio to do murals in 1987.

In 1989, Rubio, who was then 20 years old, was commissioned to do a painting for the San Fernando Cathedral in San Antonio. The result was a (13 x 10-foot) painting called the Virgin of Guadalupe, in which the artist developed his "signature style, with curvilinear lines." The artist described it as "a natural way of me making marks on a large canvas."

Rubio has studied at the San Antonio Art Institute and the University of Texas at San Antonio (UTSA). He subsequently studied printmaking with the late Sam Coronado.

Rubio has pursued a dual path as a fine artist and as a teacher for various non-profit organizations. These include: "artist-in-residence, curator and instructor at Guadalupe Cultural Arts Center, as the mural coordinator for San Anto Cultural Arts, as an instructor at the Bexar County Detention Center and as an artist-in-residence at Artpace" and "artist-in-residence and mentor at Blue Star Contemporary’s MOSAIC Student Artist Program." The latter is a program for high school students.

Zoe Palacios, one of Rubio's mentees in the Blue Star MOSAIC program, was the lead artist who designed Compass Rose, a public artwork situated near San Antonio's Cathedral inaugurated in 2014. At that time, banker Tom Frost III, formerly Blue Star's board chair, lauded Rubio: “Alex is magic. The way he merges his painting background with the art of mosaic tile takes the art form to a new level. The way he attracts young people to the program. We are very proud.” Rubio mentored MOSAIC students who completed a “Dream Peace” mural at the Coleman Underpass bridge in San Antonio in 2016.

According to one writer, for Rubio, "historic preservation of his Latino culture once meant documenting the everyday scenes of his neighborhood through painting. Now he also sees it as mentoring the youth on how to express themselves through their art, and in turn perpetuating the dialogue of the Latino experience."

Rubio calls San Antonio "the most important place in the world," and he hopes his work will lead others "to find their own connections to community and culture.”

Rubio was a victim of a drive-by shooting on Christmas Eve, 1986, at the Veramendi housing project. He later made a drawing of this event in 1994. He connected this personal tragedy to the sighting of the Lechuza, the owl woman of Mexican and Chicano folklore. Though the Lechuza is typically regarded as an evil creature to be regarded with fear, Rubio grew up with a more positive view of her. Rubio learned from his mother that while the Lechuza is ominous, it also serves a unique, positive function. She taught Rubio that the Lechuza must be regarded with respect because it serves as a messenger of danger. Rubio says he did not believe in the Lechuza until the fateful night he saw one. Rubio says he now realizes that she was trying to warn him to stay home. But he instead went out to party, and, as a consequence, Rubio nearly died from a gunshot that lodged near his heart (the basis of his 1994 drawing). The artist believes that failing to heed the Lechuza's warning almost cost him his life. This experience turned him into an ardent believer.

Rubio's large-scale painting of the Lechuza (2001) is rendered with bright colors in his curvilinear style. It traveled widely in the Chicano Visions: Painters on the Verge exhibition. Rubio also traveled from venue to venue with the exhibition. This is how he learned that belief in the Lechuza is widespread in Mexican and Chicano communities. Rubio's Lechuza is in the collection of the Cheech Marin Center for Art and Culture in Riverside, CA.

As a former tattoo artist, one who has also worked in prisons and who has a keen appreciation of tattoos, Rubio often depicts tattooed people. In his painting Street Preacher (1995), his tattooed subject is engaged in "'an almost desperate preaching,' as if he could redeem his own life by redeeming others."

In his large-scale The Four Horsemen (2006), an acrylic on eight canvases, Rubio "de-horses" and decapitates the foursome. He presents them as "martyrs for evil," and thus "transforms biblical personages into metaphors for all that ails the world."

Rubio was the recipient of a Joan Mitchell Foundation Painters & Sculptors Grant in 2007. In that year, he was also an international artist in residence at Artpace in San Antonio.

His 2008 installation at Artpace in San Antonio, done in collaboration with other artists, was called "the standout in the most recent round of Artpace residents and not just because of his powerful and signature use of color.... Rubio’s tire shop completely transformed the gallery and upon entering, I felt I had left Artpace."

Several of Rubio's works were included in the San Antonio Museum of Art's Psychedelic: Optical and Visionary Art Since the 1960s exhibition in 2010. Rubio's Four Horsemen were exhibited at SAMA in an independent exhibition at the same time.

In 2015, Rubio and his students in the MOSAIC program completed Yanaguana on four large canvases, as the first of several murals for the Art Wall, for the Yanaguana Garden at Hemisfair Park.

Rubio has participated in various art-related public service activities, including a panel called “How to Collect“ at Blue Star in 2016.

One of Rubio's recent public works is “Aqua,” situated in the San Pedro Creek Culture Park in downtown San Antonio. Rubio recorded a video treating this project in 2018. The Architect's Newspaper referred to the park as "San Antonio's Latino High Line" in 2018.

As part of the City of San Antonio's virtual Day of the Dead parade, Rubio painted a large skull in 2020 for annual display during Day of the Dead. He said he hoped his bright colors and curvilinear design will serve to “lighten up that dark heavy stigma that death instills in people,” and inspire them to “enjoy life and also, in a way, enjoy the afterlife.”

In 2021 Rubio painted a mural of a masked man, the first work in a series of artworks that are part of the City of San Antonio's COVID-19 prevention awareness campaign.

In 2025 Rubio was selected to publicly paint a mural during Luminaria, an annual San Antonio art festival.

== Works ==
The Virgin of Guadalupe, 1989, oil on canvas

Drive-By Shooting, 1994, graphite on paper

Street Preacher, 1996, acrylic on paper

El Torcido, 1996, oil on canvas

La Lechuza, 2001, oil on wood

One, 2004, acrylic on canvas

The Four Horsemen, 2006, acrylic on eight canvases

Pura Raspa, 2007, acrylic on canvas

Yanaguana, 2015, acrylic on four canvases

== Solo Exhibitions ==
2016 Rubio: Collections, Ellen Noel Art Museum, Odessa, TX

2013 Rubio, Islander Gallery, University of Texas, A&M Corpus Christi, TX

2010 A New Journey, G-Gallery, Houston, TX

2009 Painting, Ave. 50 Studio, Los Angeles, CA

2008 EXODUS, Blue Star Contemporary, Project Space, San Antonio, TX

2006 Four Horsemen, The McNay Museum of Art, San Antonio, TX

== Group Exhibitions ==
2022 Cheech Collects, Cheech Marin Center for Chicano Art & Culture, Riverside, CA

2019 The Day of the Dead in Art, Centro de Artes, San Antonio, TX

2018 Los Tejanos, Selections from the Cheech Marin Collection, The Art Museum of South Texas, Corpus Christi, TX

2014 Chicana/o Biennial 5, M.A.C.L.A, San Jose, CA

2013 Abstract Experiment, Cummings Art Center at Connecticut College, New London, CT

2012 Estampas de la Raza, McNay Museum of Art, San Antonio, TX

2011 Contemporary Drawing, McNay Museum of Art, San Antonio, TX

2010 Psychedelic, San Antonio Museum of Art, San Antonio, TX

2008 EXODUS, McKinney Avenue Contemporary, Dallas, TX

2008, San Anto, Pecan Campus Library Art Gallery at South Texas College, McAllen, TX

2008 CONSAFOS, National Museum of Mexican Art, Chicago, IL

2007 San Anto: Pride of the Southside—En El Mero Hueso, Museo Alameda, San Antonio, TX

2007 El Carreton, ArtPace Foundation, San Antonio, TX

2006 Black White (& Grey) The Gallery At The University of Texas at Arlington, Arlington, TX

2005 Contemporary Wall Painting, University of Texas, San Antonio, TX

2005 Blue Star 20, Blue Star Contemporary, Main Gallery, San Antonio, TX

2004 Arte Caliente: Selections from the Joe A. Diaz Collection. South Texas Institute for the Arts, Corpus Christi, TX

2004 Martinez, Hernandez, Rubio, y Sanchez: Chicano Arte de San Anto,Patricia Correa Gallery, Santa Monica, CA

2003 El Luchador, Blue Star Contemporary, Gallery 4, San Antonio, TX

2003 S.A.L.A. West S.A. meets East L.A., Guadalupe Cultural Arts Center, San Antonio, TX, Self Help Graphics, Los Angeles, CA

2002 Contemporary Drawing in Texas, McNay Museum of Art, San Antonio, TX

2002 Chicano Visions, Smithsonian Institution, Washington DC

2001 Chicano Visions: Painters on the Verge, San Antonio Museum of Art, San Antonio, TX

2001 Chicano Works on Paper, Blue Star Contemporary, San Antonio, TX

1998 El Papel del Papel, Universidad de Puerto Rico, San Juan, Puerto Rico

1996 Latin American Book Art, Mexic-Arte Museum, Austin, TX

1995 Drawings, McKinney Avenue Contemporary, Dallas, TX

1995 10+1, Blue Star Contemporary, Main Gallery, San Antonio, TX

1995 Social Responsibility Through Art, San Antonio Museum of Art, San Antonio, TX

1995 Artists and Texas Communities, Mexic-Arte Museum, Austin, TX

1994 Alex Rubio & Vincent Valdez, Guadalupe Cultural Arts Center, San Antonio, TX

== Public Collections ==
Blanton Museum of Art, Austin, TX

Cheech Marin Center for Arts and Culture, Riverside, CA

Fort Wayne Museum of Art, Fort Wayne, IN

Mexic Arte Museum, Austin, TX

National Hispanic Cultural Center, Albuquerque, NM

National Museum of Mexican Art, Chicago, IL

McNay Art Museum, San Antonio, TX

San Antonio Museum of Art, San Antonio, TX

Smithsonian American Art Museum, Washington, D.C.

UTSA Libraries Art Collection, San Antonio, TX

== Awards ==
2011 Vermont Studio Center, Residency, Vermont.

2007 Joan Mitchell Foundation, Artist Grant. New York, NY

2007 Art Pace Residency Grant, Artpace Foundation. San Antonio, TX

2002 S.A.L.A. Residency Grant, Guadalupe Cultural Arts Center. San Antonio, TX, and Self Help Graphics Center, Los Angeles CA.

1998-1999 Primer Paso Residency Grant, Guadalupe Cultural Arts Center. San Antonio, TX

1997 London Residency Grant, Artpace Foundation. San Antonio, TX 1992-1996

1997 Artist in Residence Program, Texas Commission on the Arts,

1997 Bexar County Detention Center (I.C.A.P.), San Antonio, TX

== Books and Catalogs ==
Banks, Melissa Richardson and Cheech Marin. Los Tejanos: Chicano Art from the Cheech Marin Collection. (2018). CauseConnect.

Cordova, Ruben C. (2004). ¡Arte Caliente! Selections from the Joe A. Diaz Collection. Corpus Christi, TX: South Texas Institute for the Arts, pp. 58–60. ISBN 1-888581-03-4

Cordova, Ruben Charles. (2019). The Day of the Dead in Art. San Antonio: Centro de Artes San Antonio, pp. 26–27, 31. https://www.sa.gov/files/assets/main/v/2/arts/documents/the-day-of-the-dead-in-art-ruben-c.-cordova.pdf

Cuba, Nan, and Riley Robinson. (2008). Art at Our Doorstep: San Antonio Writers + Artists. San Antonio: Trinity University Press, p. 19. ISBN 1595340394

Guadalupe Cultural Arts Center (San Antonio, Tex). (1998). The Role of Paper = El Papel Del Papel: A Traveling Exhibition Organized by the Guadalupe Cultural Arts Center in San Antonio, Texas. San Antonio, Tex., New Dimension Press. ISBN 3421043639

Keller, Gary D., Mary Erickson, Kaytie Johnson, Joaquín Alvarado, Arturo J. Aldama, and Craig Smith. 2002. Contemporary Chicana and Chicano Art : Artists, Works, Culture, and Education. Tempe, Arizona: Bilingual Press/Editorial Bilingüe, p. 246-47, 263.

Marin, Cheech, Max Benavidez, Constance Cortez, and Terecita Romo. (2002). Chicano Visions : American Painters on the Verge. Boston: Little, Brown and Co, pp. 118–19. ISBN 0821228064

Fred Preston, Fred, and Carmen Tafolla. (2022). PARTE DEL PUEBLO: The Outdoor Public Art of San Antonio. Schiffer Books.

Rubin, David S., Robert C. Morgan, Daniel Pinchbeck, San Antonio Museum of Art, University of Rochester Memorial Art Gallery, and Telfair Museum of Art. (2010). Psychedelic: Optical and Visionary Art since the 1960s. San Antonio, TX, Cambridge, Mass.: San Antonio Museum of Art; in association with the MIT Press, pp. 29, 43, 89. ISBN 9780262014045
