= NXTHVN =

- Founders: Titus Kaphar and Jason Price
- Location: 169 Henry Street; New Haven, CT 06511
- Website: https://www.nxthvn.com

NXTHVN (pronounced "Next Haven") is a nonprofit arts organization located at 169 Henry Street in the Dixwell neighborhood of New Haven, Connecticut. Founded in 2018 by artist Titus Kaphar and private equity professional Jason Price, NXTHVN provides mentorship and resources for emerging artists and curators. The 40,000-square-foot facility, housed in two repurposed factory buildings, contains 19 artist studios, a gallery, co-working spaces, and a planned black box theater. NXTHVN organizes public exhibitions, events, and a paid apprenticeship program for New Haven high school students.

== History ==
NXTHVN was established to provide mentorship and career support for early-career artists and curators, particularly artists of color, addressing gaps in traditional art education. Titus Kaphar, a Yale School of Art graduate and 2018 MacArthur Fellow, aimed to create a space that combines artistic development with community revitalization. Kaphar, known for paintings that critique historical narratives, partnered with Jason Price, a financial consultant with expertise in business strategy, to develop NXTHVN's innovative model. Jonathan Brand, a Canadian artist, was also a co-founder, though Kaphar and Price are the primary leaders.

The facility, designed by architect Deborah Berke of TenBerke, opened in 2019 in two former manufacturing plants in Dixwell, a historically African American neighborhood with a rich jazz heritage but economic challenges due to deindustrialization. The buildings, previously used for ice cream and laboratory equipment production, were reimagined as a multi-use arts hub. In 2020, Gagosian, Kaphar's representing gallery, endowed NXTHVN's apprenticeship program and supported professional development initiatives, including virtual studio visits.

== Programs ==
NXTHVN's core programs include:

- Fellowship Program: Annually, NXTHVN selects up to seven studio fellows and two curatorial fellows for a 10-month residency (August to May). Studio fellows receive a $35,000 stipend, 24-hour access to private studios (500–824 square feet), and subsidized housing. Curatorial fellows receive a $45,000 stipend, office space, and access to a resource library. The program includes professional development workshops, critiques by visiting artists, and mentorship. Fellows are paired with high school apprentices for mutual learning. The residency culminates in a group exhibition at a prominent gallery, often in New York.
- Apprenticeship Program: New Haven high school students, primarily from African American and Latinx communities, participate in paid apprenticeships, working one-on-one with fellows to gain hands-on arts experience. Funded by Gagosian, the program fosters career exposure and community ties.
- Public Programming: NXTHVN hosts exhibitions, performances, and community events, such as the 2019 exhibition Countermythologies. During the COVID-19 pandemic, the facility served as a pop-up vaccine clinic, reinforcing its community role.
- Business Incubator: Co-working spaces and business incubation offices support local entrepreneurs, promoting cultural and economic growth in Dixwell.

The facility includes 19 artist studios, a 3D printing lab, a gallery, and event spaces, with a black box theater under development.

== Notable Artists and Curators ==
NXTHVN's fellowship program, running since 2019, has supported diverse emerging artists and curators. Below are selected fellows from various cohorts:

=== Studio Fellows ===
- Anindita Dutta (Cohort 04, 2022–2023): An Indian sculptor and performance artist based in New York, Dutta works with wet clay and repurposed clothing to explore gender, fragility, and impermanence. Her work Sex, Sexuality and Society – France (2021) was featured in Reclamation at Sean Kelly Gallery.
- Alexandria Smith (Cohort 01, 2019–2020): A painter and mixed-media artist, Smith joined Gagosian's roster post-fellowship and exhibited widely, known for her layered, narrative-driven works.
- Ilana Savdie (Cohort 02, 2020–2021): A painter whose abstract works were showcased in a 2023 Whitney Museum solo exhibition.
- John Guzman (Cohort 03, 2021–2022): A San Antonio-based painter, Guzman's large-scale oil paintings exploring the human form were featured in Undercurrents at Sean Kelly Gallery (2022).
- Allana Clarke (Cohort 02, 2020–2021): A performance and sculpture artist addressing Black identity, featured in Un/Common Proximity at James Cohan Gallery.
- Felipe Baeza (Cohort 01, 2019–2020): A multimedia artist exploring migration and identity, exhibited at major venues post-fellowship.
- Kenturah Davis (Cohort 01, 2019–2020): Known for her text-based drawings and portraits, Davis gained recognition in national exhibitions.
- Vaughn Spann (Cohort 01, 2019–2020): A painter whose abstract works have been shown internationally.
- Layo Bright (Cohort 03, 2021–2022): A Nigerian-born artist based in Brooklyn, Bright's textiles and mixed-media works on migration were featured in Undercurrents.
- Donald Guevara (Cohort 04, 2022–2023): A multimedia artist whose work was included in Reclamation at Sean Kelly Gallery.
- Kwamé Azure Gomez (Cohort 06, 2024–2025): An interdisciplinary painter whose work Travelin' light (Dream variations) (2022) was exhibited at NXTHVN.

=== Curatorial Fellows ===
- Claire Kim (Cohort 02, 2020–2021): A curator, Kim organized Un/Common Proximity at James Cohan Gallery and co-curated Material Intimacies (2020) at NXTHVN.
- Marissa Del Toro (Cohort 03, 2021–2022): A New York-based curator, Del Toro focuses on Latin American and U.S. contemporary art. She co-curated Undercurrents at Sean Kelly Gallery and Let Them Roam Freely at NXTHVN.
- Jamillah Hinson (Cohort 03, 2021–2022): A curator, Hinson focuses on Black cultural traditions and co-curated Undercurrents and Let Them Roam Freely.
- Cornelia Stokes (Cohort 04, 2022–2023): A Syracuse-based curator, Stokes co-curated Reclamation at Sean Kelly Gallery, addressing Black diaspora arts.
- Kiara Cristina Ventura (Cohort 04, 2022–2023): A Dominican-American curator, Ventura co-curated Reclamation and runs Processa, a platform for marginalized artists.
- Marquita Flowers (Cohort 05, 2023–2024): A Bronx-based curator, Flowers co-curated Double Down at The Campus, addressing Black art practices.
- Clare Patrick (Cohort 05, 2023–2024): A South African curator based in Cape Town, Patrick co-curated Double Down and serves as art director for No! Wahala Magazine.
- Rigoberto Luna (Cohort 06, 2024–2025): A San Antonio-based curator, Luna curated Soy de Tejas: A Statewide Survey of Latinx Art.

== Exhibitions ==
NXTHVN's gallery hosts four exhibitions annually, often featuring fellows' work. Key exhibitions include:

- Counter mythologies (2019): Curated by Nico Wheadon, this inaugural show explored archival memory, featuring Cohort 01 fellows like Alexandria Smith.
- Un/Common Proximity (2021): A group show at James Cohan Gallery, New York, showcasing Cohort 02 fellows Allana Clarke, Ilana Savdie, and others, addressing pandemic and racial justice themes.
- Undercurrents (2022): Held at Sean Kelly Gallery, this Cohort 03 exhibition featured Layo Bright, John Guzman, and others, curated by Marissa Del Toro and Jamillah Hinson, exploring materiality and memory.
- Reclamation (2023): A Cohort 04 show at Sean Kelly Gallery, featuring Anindita Dutta, Donald Guevara, and others, curated by Cornelia Stokes and Kiara Cristina Ventura, examining Western consumption and beauty.
- Double Down (2024): Presented at The Campus, upstate New York, this Cohort 05 exhibition included Adrian Armstrong, Jamaal Peterman, and others, curated by Marquita Flowers and Clare Patrick.
- Deserve What You Dream (2024): A group show at NXTHVN's gallery featuring Cohort 06 fellows like Kwamé Azure Gomez.
