= Hugo McCloud =

American (born 1980)

- Born: 1980 (age 45–46); Palo Alto, California
- Occupation: Visual artist

Hugo McCloud (born 1980) is an American visual artist born in Palo Alto, California. He is inspired by urban landscapes and using unconventional, mostly industrial and discarded, materials to create his pieces, such as: black tar, bitumen, aluminum sheeting, oxidized steel plates, and plastic bags. He fuses these materials with conventional pigment and woodblock printing techniques. McCloud gets his references from photographs of people in developing countries. Using these photographs his work relates on topics like economy of labor, geopolitics, and environmental issues. His works states what reversing the negative impact of society's carbon footprint could look like.

== Early life ==
McCloud was raised by artistic parents. His mother, Irene Forster, a landscape designer, sold fountains in her interior design store. His father, James McCloud, a sculptor, was largely absent. McCloud dropped out of Tuskegee University and started working at his mother’s business, later establishing his own fabrication shop, designing and manufacturing furniture.

== Career ==
McCloud moved to New York in 2009 and moved to Mexico in 2020 to live between Mexico and the United States.

He is a designer and fabricator who did not go to a traditional art school. He did a residency in the Philippines on how to make stamps and carving blocks. He had the option to send in his designs and have a manufacturer make them in this process, but McCloud wanted to partake in the manual labor and the repetition of the stamp and carving blocks process rather than just have someone else make it from his designs.

Hugo McCloud currently lives and works in Brooklyn, New York, and Tulum, Mexico. His early work used unconventional materials like roofing metal as a canvas, and was inspired by images the artist would find on Instagram. He has explained that when looking at these images, he is “drawn to [them] either because of the composition or colors or subject matter.” Using these materials, McCloud's more abstract works still connect to conversations about social class and cultural reflections of his experiences. His latest work was inspired by his experience moving to Mexico in 2018; utilizing single-use plastic bags, McCloud depicts scenes of workers and the homeless.

== Major works ==
=== Tulum (2014) ===
This piece is made on tar paper and resembles the qualities of a painterly work, when in reality it contains very little paint material. This piece is part of a series started in 2012 when McCloud was residing in New York.

=== Burdened (2020) ===
Burdened is the exhibition at the Sean Kelly Gallery in New York where Hugo McCloud debut and got recognized for his pieces made out of plastic bags. He was inspired by his trip to Mumbai, where he saw all the colorful plastic bags stacked together to travel around the world, collect plastic bags, and to talk to people to know about their experiences.

=== The day before friday the 12th (2020) ===
This piece was part of his series of paintings that were made with colorful plastic bags. It is based on a photograph of refugees from Libya in a canoe that is filled with bodies crossing the Mediterranean.

=== the burden of man: waiting to breathe (2021) ===
This piece “is directly responding to the pandemic and other current issues happening simultaneously such as migration; the oxygen tanks are relating to the shortages in many impoverished areas,” McCloud says. It is a large painting that has oxygen tanks all across the lower half of the piece. Overlaid and mostly on the upper part of the piece are palm trees and a map. The map is of migration paths, referencing the conflicts about the incomplete border wall between Mexico and the United States.

== Solo exhibitions ==
- 2015 Fondazione 107, Turin, Italy
- 2015 The Arts Club, London, England
- 2018 Sean Kelly Gallery, New York
- 2021 Aldrich Contemporary Art Museum, Ridgefield, Connecticut
- 2021 Sean Kelly Gallery, New York
- 2015 The Arts Club, London, England
- 2018 Sean Kelly Gallery, New York
- 2021 Aldrich Contemporary Art Museum, Ridgefield, Connecticut
- 2021 Sean Kelly Gallery, New York

== Group exhibitions ==
- 2015 Studio Museum in Harlem, New Work
- 2020 The Drawing Center, New York
- 2015 Sean Kelly Gallery, New York
- 2021 Brooklyn Museum, Brooklyn, New York
- 2021 Nasher Museum of Art, New York

== Commissions ==
On April 9, 2026, the Obama Foundation announced that it had commissioned McCloud to create a work for the Obama Presidential Center. McCloud’s work Hidden Reflection is a painting that “traces significant locations in President Obama’s life, imbuing the power of place with biographical meaning.”

== Collections ==
- National Museum of African American History and Culture in Washington, D.C.
- North Carolina Museum of Art
- Detroit Institute of Arts
- Margulies collection at the Warehouse
- Nasher Museum of Art at Duke University
- Brooklyn Museum
- The Mott Warsh Collection
- The Joyner/Giuffrida Collection
