= Esteban Ramón Pérez =

American artist (born 1989)

- Born: 1989 (age 36–37); Los Angeles, California, U.S.
- Education: Yale University School of Art; California Institute of the Arts
- Known for: Multimedia painting, sculpture
- Awards: Los Angeles Artadia Award, NXTHVN Studio Fellowship
- Website: https://estebanramonperez.com/

Esteban Ramón Pérez (born 1989) is an American artist who produces multi-media paintings and sculptures. His sociopolitical artwork often emphasizes subjective memory, spirituality, and fragmented history. Pérez earned a BFA from the California Institute of the Arts in 2017 and an MFA in painting and printmaking from the Yale School of Art, New Haven, Connecticut, in 2019. Pérez's work has been exhibited in numerous group exhibitions, including shows at Artspace, New Haven, Connecticut; Eastern Connecticut State University Art Gallery, Windham, Connecticut; Transmitter Gallery, Brooklyn; James Cohan Gallery, New York; Gamma Galería, Guadalajara, Mexico; Calderón, New York; the Arlington Arts Center, Virginia; Charles Moffett, New York; and Lehmann Maupin, New York. Solo exhibitions include Staniar Gallery, Lexington, Virginia. Pérez was selected for the NXTHVN Fellowship Program and is a 2022 recipient of the Artadia Award. He lives and works in Los Angeles, California.

== Early life and education ==
Esteban Ramón Pérez was born in Los Angeles, California and spent time working in his father's upholstery shop throughout his early years. The experience informed Pérez's aesthetic vision and he eventually incorporated scrap materials from the upholstery shop including leather, velvet, feathers, and agave fiber into his multimedia works. Pérez's father exerted an important influence on his artistic formation, exposing Pérez to a variety of materials, creative skills, and techniques. Pérez's father also introduced him to Lowrider culture and Rasquachismo, two aesthetics that would impact Pérez's later artwork. Public art played a role in Pérez's early artistic formation. He recalls that he grew up in a community that was filled with murals depicting scenes of "ranching, Mexican folklore, and Pre-Colombian and Catholic iconography." Pérez links his artwork to his early artistic and personal formation, saying "my work has always been about social politics to some extent. I'm the son of immigrants, I am first generation Chicano, and my parents are both from Mexico.”

=== Education ===
Pérez earned his BFA in Art at CalArts, Valencia, CA in 2017. His undergraduate work was included in a group show Inland: BFA Work From Art Center, CalArts, And UCLA at Chan Gallery in Pomona, California in 2015. Pérez mounted three exhibitions of his work at CalArts: Udon Of Tina (2016), Old Memories (2016), and Somewhere In Aztlan (2017). In using the word Aztlán, Somewhere In Aztlan appears to be the first public installation that directly references Pérez's Chicano heritage.

In 2019, Pérez went on to earn his MFA in Painting and Printmaking at Yale School of Art. Pérez exhibited these early pieces in a series of installations at Yale: Ni de Alla (2018), Words Cannot Express (2018), Ni De Aquí (2018). Like the earlier exhibition Somewhere In Aztlan, the titles of Ni De Aquí and Ni de Alla (Spanish phrases that together translate into English as "neither from here, nor from there") seem to reference Pérez's Chicano identity, invoking concepts of liminal or borderland identities written about extensively by Chicana theorist Gloria E. Anzaldúa. Pérez's MFA thesis work was exhibited as Again, Always (2019) in Yale University's Green Hall Gallery. Throughout his time at Yale, Pérez's MFA work was also exhibited in a variety of group shows including Fantasies and Fallacies: 35 Mexican and Chicanx Artists under 35 (2017) at the Consulado General de Mexico in Los Angeles, Perverse Furniture (2019) at Artspace, New Haven, Contextual Proportions (2109) at the Jenkins Johnson Projects in Brooklyn, New York, andYale Painting & Printmaking MFA 2019 at New Release Gallery.

== Career ==
=== Residencies and awards ===
Pérez received a NXTHVN Fellowship Program in 2020. Founded by Titus Kaphar, Jason Price, and Jonathan Brand, NXTHVN fellowships are designed to foster "intergenerational mentorship, cross-sector collaboration, and local engagement [to] accelerate the careers of the next generation and foster retention of professional art talent." During his fellowship, Pérez exhibited his work in the group show NXTHVN: Un/Common Proximity at James Cohan Gallery in New York, NY with Allana Clarke, Alisa Sikelianos-Carter, Daniel T. Gaitor-Lomack, Jeffrey Meris, Ilana Savdie, and Vincent Valdez. Un/Common Proximity was curated by 2020-2021 NXTHVN Curatorial Fellow, Claire Kim. Pérez is a 2022 recipient of the Artadia Award. Pérez was among three Los Angeles-based artists who received the Artadia Award that year.

=== Permanent collections ===
- DNA (Bad Blood), 2019, Pérez Art Museum Miami (PAMM), Miami, Florida

== Artwork and exhibitions ==
=== Exhibitions ===
Pérez's work has been exhibited in numerous group exhibitions in the United States and Mexico since receiving his MFA in 2019. Group exhibitions include Artspace, New Haven, Connecticut; Eastern Connecticut State University Art Gallery, Windham, Connecticut; Transmitter Gallery, Brooklyn; James Cohan Gallery, New York; Gamma Galería, Guadalajara, Mexico; Calderón, New York; the Arlington Arts Center, Virginia; Charles Moffett, New York; and Lehmann Maupin, New York. Solo exhibitions include Staniar Gallery at Washington and Lee University in Lexington, Virginia.

Curated by Eva Mayhabal Davis, Patchwork was on view at Transmitter Gallery in Brooklyn, New York from January 9 – February 14, 2021. Patchwork highlighted works that "deal with the process and legacy of assembling fragmented histories ... and suggest that processing patchworks of history is a stepping stone for a radically imagined future."

Part of a two-person show with Jaime Muñoz, Pérez's work was exhibited in the Manhattan gallery Calderón's inaugural exhibition. Opened during the 2020 COVID-19 pandemic, Calderón Gallery founders Nicole Calderón and Mike Ruiz sought to create a NYC gallery that recognized the "relative absence of Latin American and diasporic artists from the canon.” Calderón and Ruiz opened their space in Manhattan's Seaport district with the pledge to support the careers of Latinx creators and secure their position in art history.

Pérez's work was exhibited in the traveling group show The Future is LATINX, which debuted at Eastern Connecticut State University's Art Gallery. Exhibition Coordinator Yulia Tikhonova noted that the exhibition was intended to "draw attention to the rich cultural production of our Latino population as we continue on our path to becoming a 'minority white' nation [...] This community will dramatically change our politics, media, education, and cultural landscape. This is the future our exhibition anticipates." The Future is LATINX was on view at the Eastern Connecticut State University Art Gallery in Windham, Connecticut from October 8 - December 2, 2020. The exhibition traveled to Clark University's Schiltkamp Gallery under the title Latin + American from March 15 – May 9, 2021 and Three Rivers Community College in Norwich, Connecticut from August 30 – October 1, 2021.

Pérez's work was included in In Spite of Modernism: Contemporary Art, Abstract Legacies, and Identity featured works meant to "challenge abstract styles narrowly associated with Modernism [and] confront the Modern movement's exclusions of race, gender, and sexuality, and offer a more inclusive interpretation of the history and artistic styles that gave Western Modern artists global recognition." In Spite of Modernism: Contemporary Art, Abstract Legacies, and Identity was curated by Haley Clouser, who was at the time an independent curator and Curatorial Fellow at DeCordova Sculpture Park and Museum.

Pérez's work was included in Eyes of the Skin, an exhibition mounted between June 9 – August 12, 2022 at Lehmann Maupin. The exhibition was curated by New York City-based artist Teresita Fernández, who was represented by Lehmann Maupin at the time. The exhibition emphasized "the importance of indigenous, intuitive, and somatic knowledge as a primary source for understanding our world." His work has also been featured in the collections display at Pérez Art Museum Miami, Florida.
