= Sylvia Wald =

American visual artist (1915–2011)

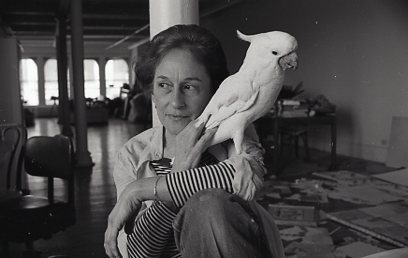
- Born: October 30, 1915; Philadelphia, Pennsylvania
- Died: March 24, 2011 (aged 95); New York, NY
- Education: Moore Institute
- Known for: Printmaker, Sculptor
- Notable work: Dark Wings (1953/54), Spirit's Constellation (1952), Between Dimensions (1950),
- Style: Social Realism, Abstract Expressionism
- Spouse: Po Kim
- Website: waldandkimgallery.org

Sylvia Wald (/wɔːld/; October 30, 1915 – March 24, 2011) was an American visual artist. Born in Philadelphia and educated at Moore Institute of Art, she began as a painter in the style of the American social realist school, before turning to Abstract Expressionism through her pioneering work in silk screening and sculptural collage. She has been noted for her "wide range of expression, diversity of media and technical excellence."

== Biography ==
After graduation from Moore Institute, Wald worked as an elementary school art teacher in conjunction with the Works Project Administration (WPA). Her early work reflects this social engagement. Working in the "social realist" tradition, she specialized in scenes of proletariat American life, which she then contributed to populist and Marxist journals of the period, including The New Masses. Wald moved to New York City in the late 1930s.

Her work was included in the 1940 MoMA show American Color Prints Under $10 The show was organized as a vehicle for bringing affordable fine art prints to the general public. She was also included in the 1947 and 1951 Dallas Museum of Fine Arts exhibitions of the National Serigraph Society.

During the forties and fifties, with Abstract Expressionism rising to dominate the New York art scene, Wald's work became increasingly abstract. Eventually she would come to be seen as a pioneer of the movement, especially for her innovations in silk screening, a technique she adopted in 1941 after observing Harry Gottlieb in Louisville, Kentucky, while on assignment with her first husband, a medical practitioner. Instead of ink, the standard material, she used oil paints. She brought the "action painting" method, popularized by Jackson Pollock among others, to textile work, large-scale pieces 5–6 feet square. She continued to make her prints without the assistance of a professional printer or printmaking studio, stating that "I never felt that my particular style was suitable for making prints with a printer."

From the sixties onward, Wald became increasingly interested in sculpture, especially collage and assemblage. She often worked with paper, which she treated with the same sense of experimental abandon as she had previously brought to silk screening—dying, folding, twisting, ripping the material in search of new possibilities of expression.

After the death of her first husband in 1963, and her mother several years later, her sculptural work became even more experimental through the incorporation of more diverse materials, including wire, string, bamboo, and plaster.

She married the artist Po Kim, with whom she established The Sylvia Wald and Po Kim Art Gallery, a non-profit art foundation still located at their former in New York City residence.

Her work is featured in numerous collections, including: Metropolitan Museum of Art, Museum of Modern Art, The Brooklyn Museum, Brooklyn, The Whitney Museum of American Art, The Solomon R.Guggenheim Museum, in New York, Philadelphia Museum of Art, Philadelphia, Pennsylvania, National Gallery of Art, Washington D.C, Worcester Art Museum, Worcester, and Rose Art Museum, Brandeis University, Waltham, Massachusetts, Grunewald Collection Museum, U.C.L.A., Los Angeles, Bibliothèque Nationale, Paris, France, Victoria and Albert Museum, London, England.
