= Glendalys Medina =

Glendalys Medina's practice focuses on transcending the symbolic systems of language and image by investigating the role they play in forming identity. Medina is currently a professor at SVA’s MFA Fine Arts program and lives and works in New York.

== Early life and education ==
Medina is an interdisciplinary artist and received an MFA and BFA from Hunter College and studied at the Slade School of Fine Art under to tutelage of Phyllida Barlow and Eva Rothschild.

== Career ==
Medina's work has been presented at such notable venues as Artpace, PAMM, where her work is featured in the permanent collection, Participant Inc., Performa 19, Artists Space, The Bronx Museum of Art, El Museo del Barrio, The Museum of Contemporary Art in Vigo, Spain, Smack Mellon and The Studio Museum in Harlem among others. Medina was a recipient of a Pollock-Krasner grant, Jerome Hill Foundation Fellowship (2019), a residency at Yaddo (2014, 2018), the Rome Prize in Visual Arts (2013), a New York Foundation for the Arts Fellowship in Interdisciplinary Art (2012), and the Bronx Museum of the Arts AIM residency (2010).
