= Po Kim =

Korean-American visual artist

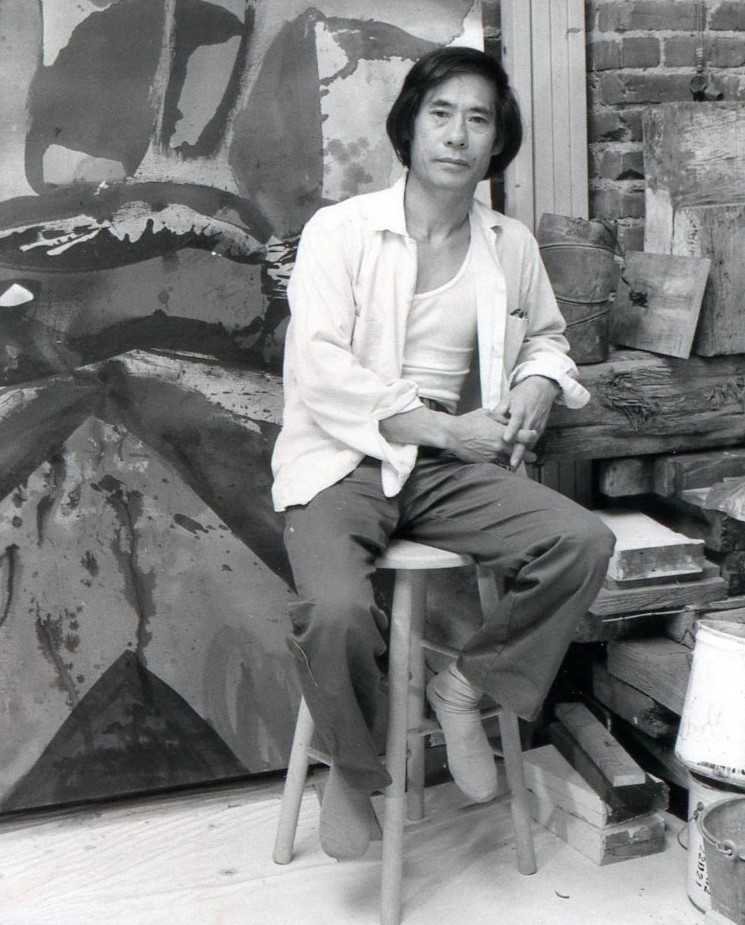
- Born: Kim Po-hyun; 1917; Changnyeong-eup (창녕면), Korea
- Died: February 7, 2014 (aged 96–97); New York, NY
- Known for: Artist, art teacher
- Style: Abstract Expressionism, Neo-Expressionism
- Spouse: Sylvia Wald

Korean name
- Hangul: 김보현
- Hanja: 金寶鉉
- RR: Gim Bohyeon
- MR: Kim Pohyŏn
- Website: www.waldandkimgallery.org

Po Kim (1917 – February 7, 2014) was a Korean-American visual artist. Born in Changnyeong, Korea, Kim was among the first of a generation of Korean artists who moved to the United States in the 1950s and is one of the earliest-known Korean artists to permanently work and reside in New York City. Having received both Western and Eastern artistic training, he developed his own unique fusion of both traditions and continuously explored various styles throughout his career, from Abstract Expressionism in the 1950s, to realist still-life drawings in the 1970s and large-scale Neo-Expressionistic figurative and allegorical works from the 1980s onward. Shortly after his death a critic called him "artist who found great inspiration in his identities as a Korean, an American, and a New Yorker," and said, "Po Kim’s artistic career was characterized by an ever-evolving style, and an eagerness to seek out new areas of inspiration."

== Early life ==
Po was born in 1917 in the south-east corner of the Korean peninsula. (Note: His birthplace was Changnyeong-eup, a town in the south-eastern part of the Korean peninsula. He grew up there and in the city of Daegu.) Shortly after his birth his father died of flu causing the family to descend into poverty. (Note: A brother and a sister subsequently died of lung disease.) Because his mother disapproved of his early interest in art, Kim painted in secret. Late in life he said his early passion persisted as he grew up and resulted in a commitment to make art whether or not it received critical recognition or sales.

At nineteen he left home to study in Tokyo. Over the next seven or eight years he studied at the Pacific Arts School as well as the Meiji University Law School and the Imperial Commercial School. (Note: Korea had been annexed by Japan in 1910 and until 1945 was ruled as an imperial possession. Kim graduated from a school referred to as the Imperial Commercial School in 1941. This school was probably the Tokyo Higher Commercial School. He was admitted to the Law School of Meiji University in 1942. This school provided both undergraduate and graduate education and it was probably the former which admitted him.)

In 1946 he returned to Korea and established the Department of Fine Arts at Chosun University, where he served as chairman and professor until 1955. During the political confrontations prior to the Korean War he was subjected to imprisonment and torture by both left-wing rebels and government forces. Due to his political neutrality, he suffered torture, arrest and surveillance committed by both political sides of the Korean War. In 1955 he was invited to a fellowship at the University of Illinois at Urbana-Champaign, which he accepted, afterwards moving to New York in 1957 and eventually becoming a US citizen. He did not return to Korea for more than 30 years.

== Career in New York City ==
Arriving in New York during the height of the Abstract Expressionist movement, Kim immersed himself in the period's dynamic avant-garde environment, interacting with many of the New York School artists active in Downtown Manhattan at the time. Within this circle he met his future wife, the artist Sylvia Wald. Together with the artist Lenore Tawney, they purchased a house at 37 East 4th Street, which they renovated with artist studios and gallery. In 1978, Kim and Wald purchased the building at 417 Lafayette Street, where they lived and worked until their deaths. They established the Sylvia Wald and Po Kim Art Gallery, a non-profit art foundation, which is still located there today.

Po Kim, Untitled, 1958, oil on linen, 60 x 72 inches

Kim's first work was in the then-dominant Abstract Expressionist style. His paintings, in the words of one critic, were "suffused with the aesthetic of his Korean heritage." The untitled painting of 1958, shown here to the left, is an example of this work.

Po Kim, Abstract 412, 1961-62, oil on paper, 18.5 x 24 inches

During the 1960s his paintings showed some influence from the Color Field artists of the time. Kim's Abstract 412 of 1961-62, at right, is an example of his work in the 1960s.

Po Kim, Pear, 1975-77, colored pencil on paper, 13. 5 x 12.5 inches

In the 1970s he made realistic still life drawings that were said to be "remarkable for their technical proficiency, and the sense of Zen-like concentration that [he] brought to bear on their creation." Pear of 1975-77, shown to the left, is an example of these still lifes.

Po Kim, Daydream in Studio II, 1981, oil on canvas, 78 x 60 inches

Thereafter he worked out an abstract-realist synthesis in a manner referred to as "expressionist figuration." These large canvases show animals, humans, and nature containing "mysterious alternative realities." Daydream in Studio II, at right, shows this late style.

Po Kim in his studio, 2011

The photo of the artist at left shows him working on a large canvas near the end of his life. In 2013 a critic noted that Kim's "journey, in a sense, recapitulated all of the artist's experience with forms, images, techniques, and conceptual approaches."

Works from Kim's six-decade career have been featured in numerous solo and group exhibitions in distinguished institutions throughout South Korea, Europe, and the U.S. His works are also held in national and international collections, including the Solomon R. Guggenheim Museum, the Art Institute of Chicago, National Museum of Contemporary Art in South Korea, Seoul Art Center, and the Gwangju Museum of Art in South Korea. In 2000, Chosun University awarded Kim an honorary Doctor of Letters degree in honor of his life accomplishments and contributions to the artistic community. In 2002, the Chosun University Art Museum in Gwangju established the Po Kim and Sylvia Wald Art Museum to house their permanent collection of more than 300 works by Kim.

== Critical notice ==
Critical notice of Kim's paintings increased gradually during his career and expanded dramatically after his death. In his work he was seen to have gradually come to terms with the tragedies of his life in Korea and, in the end, to have achieved a peaceful resolution of early traumas. He was also seen to have merged the Japanese training and Korean cultural influences with distinctly American expressionist technique. In 2012 he gave an interview in which he recapitulated his artistic career, concluding by stating, "Painting is my life. There is nothing else."
