= Carolina Caycedo =

American artist

Carolina Caycedo (born 1978, in London, United Kingdom) is a multimedia artist based in Los Angeles.

Born to Colombian parents, Caycedo's art practice is based on environmental research focusing on the future of shared resources, environmental justice, energy transition and cultural biodiversity. Through contributing to community-based construction of environmental and historical memory, Caycedo seeks the ways of preventing violence against humans and nature.

Her work has been shown in museums around the world, including in a number of international biennales, such as the 2024 Artes Mundi 10 in Wales, the 2019 Chicago Architecture Biennial, 2018 Hammer Museum “Made in L.A.” biennial, 2016 São Paulo Art Biennial, 2010 Pontevedra Biennial, 2009 Havana Biennial, 2009 San Juan Poligraphic Triennial, 2006 Whitney Biennial, and 2003 Venice Biennale.

== Education ==
Caycedo received a Master of Fine Arts (MFA) from the University of Southern California in 2012, and a Bachelor of Fine Arts (BFA) from the University of the Andes in Bogotá, Colombia in 1999.

== Selected awards ==
Caycedo was an artist in residence at the DAAD Artists-in-Berlin Program in 2012. She was awarded the “Five Initiative” from the Vincent Price Art Museum, in Monterey Park, California, and The Huntington Library, in San Marino, California, United States. This award focuses on the expansion of Huntington Library's art collections, with the aim that awarded artists create new works around the theme of identity. Caycedo also won the 2015 Creative Capital Visual Arts Award. In 2021 she was awarded a Latinx Artist Fellowship. In 2023 United States Artists Fellowship,and Soros Arts Fellowship. In 2023-2024 she was the artist in residence at the Getty Research Institute. Caycedo is the 2025-2026 artist in residency at Para La Naturaleza, the former Land Conservation Trust of Puerto Rico.

== Selected works ==
Caycedo's work is included in several collections at major art museums including the Whitney Museum of American Art and Los Angeles County Museum of Art. Her work is also included in Defining Line, an AR public art exhibition curated by Nancy Baker Cahill and Debra Scacco.

=== To Drive Away Whiteness/Para alejar la blancura ===
To Drive Away Whiteness/Para alejar la blancura (2017) was a multi-media sculpture shown at Hammer Museum, Los Angeles as a part of 2018 “Made in L.A.” biennial.

=== Be Dammed ===
Caycedo's project Be Dammed (since 2012) is a body of video, artist book, and installation works that focus on Colombian communities residing around the Magdalena River in Colombia that are being affected by extractivist industries such as the construction of dams and the privatization of the river.

By 2014, 200,000 Colombian residents had been displaced under of the resource extraction projects along with the river, and privatization of the land, and Caycedo has been researched on the aftermath of the relocation to create this artwork. In 2019, she showed a performance piece, Beyond Control at the Museo de Arte Moderno de Medellín, Colombia. The performance, choreographed in collaboration with Rebeca Hernandez, sought to visualize the relations between dams and how humans manage bodies of water.

=== Cosmotarrayas ===
Caycedo’s Cosmotarrayas (2016) is an offshoot of her project longest ongoing project Be Dammed. Cosmotarraya is a series of hanging sculptures made from handmade fishnets and other found objects. They were collected during her field research while she was at the Magdalena River interviewing people affected by the privatization of waters and the building of dams. The fishing nets would be dyed and assembled with the various objects in her Los Angeles studio. She dyed them 3 specific colors: black, red, and brown. These colors are supposed to reference the coloration of toxic mudflow created by the failure of the building of the Fundão tailings dam at the Germano iron ore mine of the Samarco Mariana Mining Complex near Minas Gerais, Brazil in 2015.

Caycedo used the fishnets to symbolize an object that is the complete opposite of what a dam is. Caycedo told the New York Times, “The dam is corporate-made, impenetrable, unmovable It cuts the body of the river in two. It cuts the flow of the ecosystem. On the other side you have the fishing net, which is man-made, small-scale, porous, flexible, malleable. It lets the water through but catches the sustenance.” The fishnets are also a symbol of the livelihoods displaced by dam building and water privatization.

=== Serpent River Book ===
Serpent River Book (2017) is part of Caroline Caycedo's ongoing artistic project Be Dammed (2010). Serpen River Book is a 72-page artist book combines Caycedo's illustrations and texts related to rivers with materials such as images, maps, poems, lyrics, and satellite photos, creating a collage reminiscent of the winding shape of a river. The content of the book is collected from Caycedo's work in communities in Colombia, Brazil, and Mexico affected by the industrialization and privatization of river systems. The book explores the impact of river privatization and industrialization on rivers and the surrounding communities.

=== How to obtain a British passport ===
How to obtain a British passport (2003) is a video work based on both the real and fiction-based acting of Caycedo and her Colombian friend, performing a civil marriage ceremony.

=== Daytoday ===
Daytoday (2002–09) was Caycedo's individual project, in which she stayed metropolitan cities such as New York, London, and Vienna without having any money or no essential goods. She lived day-to-day by offering people basic skills, such as haircuts or Spanish lessons, as an exchange for food or a place to stay for a night.

=== Apariciones/Apparitions ===
Apariciones/Apparitions is a video work that debuted at The Huntington Library as part of the institution's contemporary arts initiative called "/five." The nine-and-a-half-minute video features ghost-like dancers inhabiting The Huntington's collection.

=== The Collapse of a Model ===
The Collapse of a Model consists of two massive photomontages made of composite satellite imagery of three major dam sites. The piece suggests a hopeful nod toward the end of the capitalist model of resource extraction.

== Exhibitions ==
Her work has been exhibited at Marron Atrium of the Museum of Modern Art (MoMA) in New York (2023); Institute of Contemporary Art (ICA) in Boston, Massachusetts (2020); the Orange County Museum of Art in Santa Ana, California (2019); the Muzeum Sztuki in Lodz, Poland (2019); the United Nations Economic Commission for Europe (UNECE) in Astana, Kazakhstan (2018); the New Museum of Contemporary Art (NUMU) in Guatemala (2017); Clockshop in Los Angeles, California (2015); the Instituto de Visión in Bogotá, Colombia (2014); daadgalerie in Berlin, Germany (2013); and the Galerie du Jour in Paris, France (2013).

Caycedo has participated in group exhibitions at the Ulrich Museum of Art, Wichita, Kansas (In the Wake, 2019); Chicago Architecture Biennial in Chicago, Illinois (2019); the Museo de Arte São Paulo in Brazil (2019); the Hamburger Bahnhof in Berlin, Germany (2018); the Hammer Museum in Los Angeles, California (2018); the Whitney Museum of American Art in New York City, New York (2018); the Seoul Museum of Art in Seoul, Korea (2017); the Los Angeles County Museum of Art (LACMA) in Los Angeles, California (2017); Les Recontres d'Arles in Arles, France (2017); and the KW Institute for Contemporary Art in Berlin, Germany (2014).
