= Social Income =

Nonprofit organization

- Founded: 2019; 7 years ago
- Type: non-profit organization
- Purpose: Alleviating extreme poverty through cash transfers
- Region served: Freetown, Sierra Leone
- Founding Director: Sandino Scheidegger
- Employees: Approx 15
- Website: socialincome.org

Social Income is a nonprofit organization based in Switzerland that provides unconditional cash transfers via mobile phone to people living in multidimensional poverty in West Africa. Since 2020, Social Income has been running an open-ended universal basic income program in Sierra Leone.

== History ==
Social Income was established in December 2019 and became operational in March 2020, coinciding with the onset of the COVID-19 crisis. While individual donors, pledging 1% of their income, provide the majority of financial donations, operational costs are also supported by corporate contributions, prize money such as the Lean Innovation Award, and support from the Swiss Agency for Development and Cooperation in the framework of the Humanitarian Innovation Exchange and Accelerator.

== Operations ==
=== COVID-19 support ===
Social Income initiated over 2,000 payments to individuals adversely affected by the economic repercussions of COVID-19 restrictions. As the pandemic began to impact West African nations, leading to border closures, the project was concurrently launched to address the emerging needs. Recipients of the program are guaranteed support for a duration of three years.

=== Basic income experiment ===
In March 2020, Social Income launched an open-ended experiment to test a universal basic income (UBI) in Sierra Leone. The instalments are paid out unconditional. The country was selected for this experiment due to its significant poverty levels, with 59.2 percent of the population living in poverty. Social Income differs from other universal basic income projects like GiveDirectly in that it operates as an open-source initiative.
