= National Association of Latino Arts and Cultures =

US non-profit organization

The National Association of Latino Arts and Cultures
- Formation: 1989
- Founder: Multiple (Pedro Rodriguez, etc..)
- Type: Arts
- Purpose: Promotion of Latino Arts and Cultures
- Headquarters: Texas
- Leader: Maria López De León
- Website: Official website

The National Association of Latino Arts and Cultures (NALAC) is a San Antonio, Texas-based, non-profit organization dedicated to Latino art and culture. It is the United States' primary arts organization dedicated towards the promotion of Latino art and artists in the United States and Latin America. It supports 900 artists and art-based organizations. Since its founding in 1989, NALAC has provided over 2.3 million dollars in grant money in support of over 185,000 Latino artists and art based organizations throughout the region.

== History ==
NALAC was founded in 1989 when a group of Latino artists of various disciplines, came together to advocate nationally for Latino art. Initially NALAC provided Latino artists with a network of support, but found itself struggling and without clear direction.

NALAC's board of directors appointed long-time volunteer María López De León as executive director in 2002. Maria served on the National Council of the Arts under president Barack Obama. Maria utilized her network within the art world to raise money and create NALAC's first grant program - NALAC Fund for the Arts. The Fund allowed individual projects to be brought to life, but only provided funding for single projects and most artists had trouble marketing themselves or their work.

== Leadership Institute ==
In the early 1990s, NALAC began to develop the "Leadership Institute". The Institute selects promising artists and teaches them how to network and develop business and administration skills. Additionally, they help to cultivate their artistic skills and network with other artists. The Leadership Institute was facilitated by teachers such as Actor/Director Rosalba Rolon, Maribel Alvarez and Abel Lopez and helped develop the career of artist Lia Uribe, among others.

== Transnational Cultural Remittances Grant Program ==
Created in 2008 and supported by the National Endowment for the Arts, The Ford Foundation and The Andrew Mellon Foundation, it was a way for both individuals and community groups to utilize art for cultural exchange between the United States, Mexico and Central America.

== Documentary ==
Visiones, produced by Galan productions and NALAC, is a six-part documentary series that takes audiences on a trip across the United States, displaying the creative talent of Latino artists from all walks of life. The documentary was presented on PBS and went on to win the Imagen award. The series, along with its accompanying education curriculum, is a tool created to expose student to Latino arts and culture; it has been distributed to more than 35,000 schools.
