= Julian Charrière =

French-Swiss conceptual artist

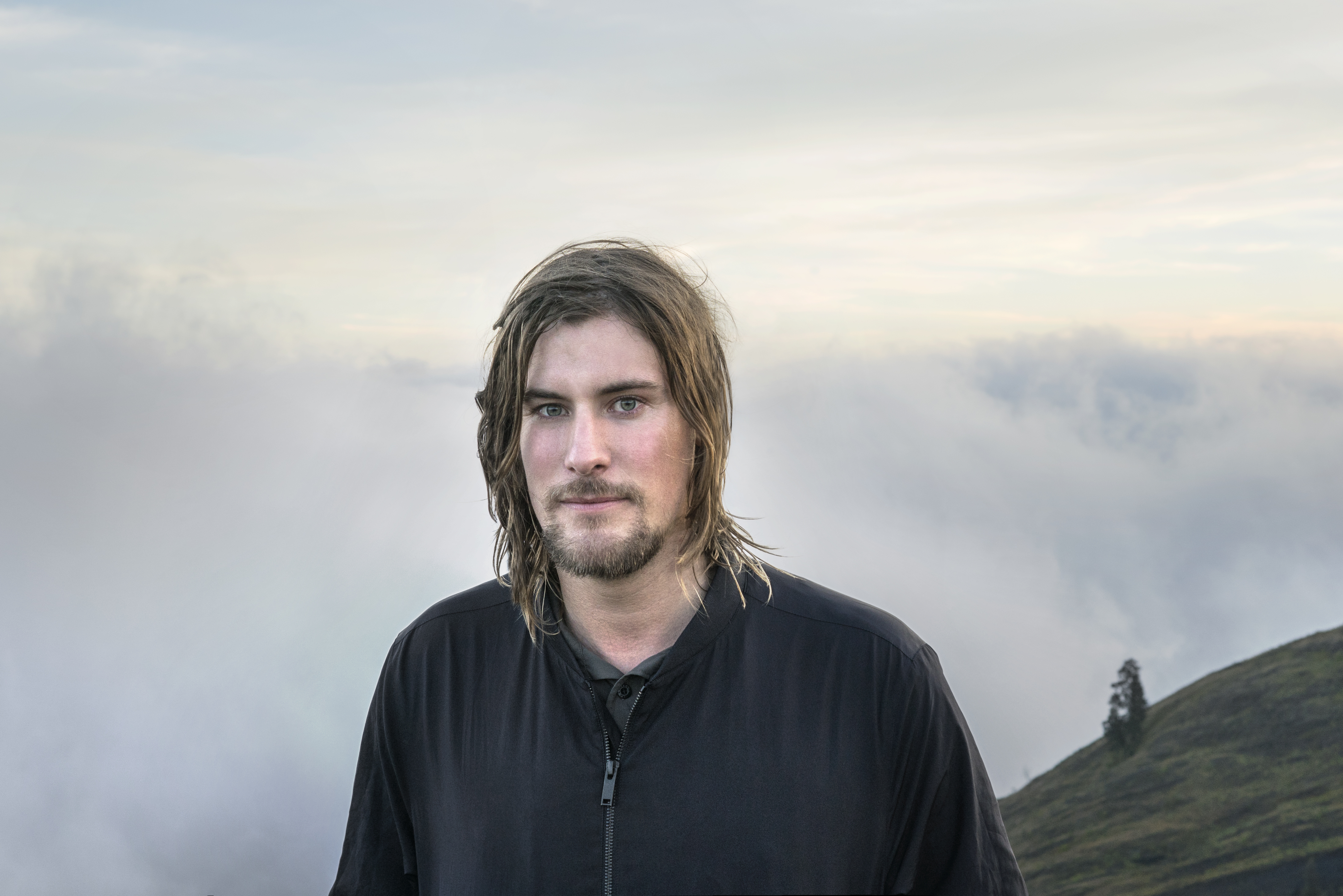
- Charrière in 2017
- Born: 1987 (age 38–39); Morges, Switzerland
- Education: École cantonale d'art du Valais, Valais, Switzerland; Berlin University of Arts, Berlin, Germany
- Website: julian-charriere.net

Julian Charrière (born 1987) is a French-Swiss conceptual artist, currently living and working in Berlin. He uses several artistic approaches including photography, performance, sculpture, and video, to address concepts relating to time and human's relationship to the natural world.

== Early life and education ==
Charrière was born in Morges, Switzerland, to a Swiss father and French mother. He studied art at the École cantonale d'art du Valais in Switzerland before moving to Berlin to finish his degree at the Universität der Künste where he graduated in 2013 from Olafur Eliasson's Institute of Spatial Experiments.

== Career ==
Charrière's research-driven practice fuses art, science, and anthropology, highlighting the tensions inherent in our modern world. Inspired by land artists such as Robert Smithson as well as writers like author J. G. Ballard and philosophers Dehlia Hannah and Timothy Morton, his work contributes to a discussion of social and environmental implications of the advancements which have pushed society forward. These ideas link Charrière to the 19th century Romantic era during which human's place within the world was reexamined as a response to the industrial revolution and humanist philosophy. Throughout his body of work, Charrière experiments with nonconventional materials and methods for the symbolic significance that they carry. Time is often utilised as a motif in his artworks, as they are intended to be created and exist within their own timeline while commenting on their place within the broader human timescale.

Charrière is interested in the concept of fossils as physical markers of time and, more specifically, what artifacts will be left behind to shape future generations' interpretations of his era. Charrière has crafted a "geo-archaeology of the future." Geological specimens being the only form of documentation of Earth's early eons, the artist reinterpreted this idea to create the series Metamorphism wherein electronic waste is melted together with artificial lava and transformed into natural-looking rocks, essentially returning the technological devices to the raw materials from which they are made. This project is one of several sculptural series by Charrière using natural and human-made materials, which provides a physical commentary on the increasingly digitalized world.

Much of his work has been the result of various expeditions around the world, focusing on locations impacted by humanity. Such locations visited by Charrière include the Semipalatinsk Test Site, a former USSR nuclear test site, and its American equivalent, the Bikini Atoll in the Marshall Islands. As a result of these two journeys, Charrière created a series of photographs documenting the desolate remnants of the sites developed from analog film exposed to nuclear materials, giving the invisible force of radioactivity a visible presence within the images. In addition, Julian Charrière also co-wrote with Nadim Samman – with whom he traveled – As We Used to Float, straddling the genres of travelog and critical essay. Described as: "toggling between a personal account of a sea journey, above and below water, and a critical investigation of postcolonial geography, As We Used to Float develops broader reflections on place and subjectivity".

Charrière has received several awards. He was awarded the Kiefer Hablitzel Award during the Swiss Art Awards in 2013 and 2015. In 2016, Charrière received the Kaiserring Stipendium für Junge Kunst, which resulted in a solo exhibition at the Mönchehaus Museum Goslar in Germany. In 2018 the artist received the Prix Mobilière which honors young artists addressing particularly socially relevant issues and make up new collective perspectives with their positions; as well as the GASAG Kunstpreis, awarded every two years to outstanding artistic positions at the intersection of art, science, and technology. In 2021, he was nominated for the Prix-Marcel-Duchamp, as well as for the Hans-Purrmann-Prize and the Prix de la Fondation Choi pour l'art contemporain. In 2021 Charrière was invited by the artists-in-labs KAUST-Swiss Residency Exchange for a three-month Artist Residency in Saudi Arabia.

In addition to working as a solo artist, Charrière has collaborated with other artists, being a member of the Berlin-based artist collective, Das Numen. The collective has exhibited across Europe and has received several awards. In 2012, Charrière collaborated with the artist Julius von Bismarck on the site-specific performance piece Some Pigeons Are More Equal Than Others for the 13th Venice Architecture Biennale. The two have continued to work together, producing several exhibitions in tandem with one another.

The artist became the subject of international news in March 2017 when Berlin police were called to his studio after the testing of his new piece commenting on peaceful scientific development and the dangers of climate change entitled The Purchase of the South Pole. The three-meter long air cannon was originally meant to shoot coconuts from the Bikini Atoll as a part of the first Antarctic Biennale. Because of its seizure, the artwork never made it to Antarctica and currently remains in the custody of the German authorities.

In the course of his invitation to the Antarctic Biennial 2017, the artist developed a new body of work in which he intensively explored the polar regions and their mode of representation in the collective visual memory of the 21st century. This resulted in his most extensive film work at that point, Towards No Earthly Pole, which formed a focal point in the artist's three solo exhibitions of the same name (MASI Lugano, 2019, Aargauer Kunsthaus, 2020, Dallas Museum of Art, 2021). The exhibitions became a journey through the cosmos of the artist, while offering an exploration of the impact of human activity on nature. Charrière uses the two opposing elements of ice and fire to symbolize change and transformation and the contrast between them defines the exhibitions and guides through them. His curiosity and interest in understanding the environment lead him to areas that are global flashpoints for our past, present, and future. A publication is dedicated to the film work Towards No Earthly Pole and places it in a context throughout essays written by leading scholars from the disciplines of philosophy, film research, and art history including Francesca Benini, Amanda Boetzkes, Katherine Brodbeck, Dehlia Hannah, Scott MacKenzie & Anna Westerstahl Stenport, Shane McCorristine, Nadim Samman and Katrin Weilenmann as well as a conversation between the artist and Prof. Dr. Konrad Steffen, Professor of Climate and Cryosphere at ETH Zurich and EPFL.

In 2021, Charrière participated in the Leister Expedition Around North Greenland 2021, a Swiss-Danish expedition. Its primary purpose was to conduct research into climate change in the Arctic. During the expedition, the team landed on a 300-meter-long islet, created by mud and soil, believed to be Oodaaq island, only later to realize they actually had just discovered the northernmost island of Greenland's coast. Charrière, the only artist invited to take part in the expedition covered the discovery.

== Art market ==
Charrière has been represented by Sean Kelly Gallery since 2017, and by Galerie Perrotin since September 2023.

== Controversy ==
In early 2023, the French fashion brand Zadig & Voltaire was criticized for a promotional Instagram video featuring a flaming fountain after social media users said it bore a striking resemblance to Charrière's video work And Beneath It All Flows Liquid Fire (2019).

== Selected exhibitions ==
Solo exhibitions

- Horizons, Dittrich & Schlechtriem, Berlin, Germany, 2011
- On The Sidewalk, I Have Forgotten The Dinosauria Dittrich & Schlechtriem, Berlin, Germany, 2013
- We are all Astronauts, Centre Culturel Suisse, Paris, 2014
- Clockwork, (in collaboration with Julius von Bismark) Oben, Vienna, Austria, 2014
- Die Welt ist mittelgross, Kunstverein Arnsberg, Germany, 2014
- Future Fossil Spaces, Musée cantonal des Beaux-arts de Lausanne, Lausanne, Switzerland, 2014
- Somewhere, Rudolph-Scharpf-Galerie, Wilhelm-Hack-Museum, Ludwigshafen, Germany, 2014
- Polygon, Galerie Bugada & Cargnel, Paris, France, 2015
- Freeze, Memory, Sean Kelly Gallery, New York, 2016
- Into the Hollow, Dittrich & Schlechtriem, Berlin, Germany, 2016
- For They That Sow the Wind, Parasol unit foundation for contemporary art, London, England, 2016
- Julian Charrière, Mönchehaus Museum Goslar, Goslar, Germany, 2016
- First Light, Galerie Tschudi, Zuoz, Switzerland, 2016
- Pitch Drop, Sies + Höke Galerie, Düsseldorf, Germany, 2016
- Desert Now, (in collaboration with Julius von Bismarck and Felix Kiessling) Steve Turner Gallery, Los Angeles, USA, 2016
- Objects In Mirror Might Be Closer Than They Appear, (in collaboration with Julius von Bismarck) Villa Bernasconi, Grand-Lancy, Switzerland, 2016
- Siempre cuenta cuántos cuentos cuentas, Despacio, San José, Costa Rica, 2016
- Das Numen – Meatus, Dittrich & Schlechtriem, Berlin, Germany, 2017
- Ever Since We Crawled Out, Galerie Tschudi, Zuoz, Germany, 2017
- Julius von Bismarck und Julian Charrière. I'm Afraid I Must Ask You to Leave, with Julius von Bismarck, Kunstpalais Erlangen, Erlangen, Germany, 2018
- An Invitation to Disappear, Ben Brown Fine Arts, Hong Kong, China, 2018
- GASAG Kunstpreis 2018: Julian Charrière. As We Used to Float, Berlinische Galerie, Berlin, Germany, 2018
- An Invitation to Disappear | Giétro 2018 – 1818, Dam of Mauvoisin, Musée de Bagnes, Le Châble, Switzerland, 2018
- An Invitation to Disappear, Kunsthalle Mainz, Mainz, Germany, 2018
- Twin Earth, with Marguerite Humeau, SALTS, Basel, Switzerland, 2019
- All We Ever Wanted Was Everything and Everywhere, MAMbo, Bologna, Italy, 2019
- Silent World, Dittrich & Schlechtriem, Berlin, Germany, 2019
- Julian Charrière + Julius von Bismarck: I Am Afraid I Must Ask You to Leave, with Julius von Bismarck, Sies + Höke, Düsseldorf, Germany, 2019
- Towards No Earthly Pole, MASI Lugano, Lugano, Switzerland, 2019
- Towards No Earthly Pole, Sean Kelly Gallery, New York City, USA, 2020
- Thickens, pools, flows, rushes, slows, Sies + Höke, Düsseldorf, Germany, 2020
- Towards No Earthly Pole, Aargauer Kunsthaus, Aarau, Switzerland, 2020
- Towards No Earthly Pole, Dallas Museum of Art, 2021
- Soothsayers, DITTRICH & SCHLECHTRIEM, Berlin, Germany, 2021

Group exhibitions

- Berlin 2000 – Playing among the Ruins, Museum of Contemporary Art Tokyo, Tokyo, Japan, 2011
- Über Lebens Kunst, Haus der Kulturen der Welt, Berlin, Germany, 2011
- Without Destination, Reykjavik Art Museum, Reykjavik, Iceland, 2011
- Common Ground, 13th International Architecture Exhibition – La Biennale di Venezia, Venice, Italy, 2012
- Des Présents Inachevés, Les Modules du Palais de Tokyo at 12th Art Biennale de Lyon, Lyon, France, 2013
- move, – align – avid / Vom Schwarm als Prinzip and Phäenomen, Kunstverein Harburger Bahnhof, Hamburg, Germany, 2013
- Kochi-Muziris Biennale, Fort Kochi, Kerala, India, 2014
- Festival of Future Nows, Neue Nationalgalerie, Berlin, Germany, 2014
- One Place Next to Another, Winzavod Center for Contemporary Art, Moscow, Russia, 2014
- The Future of Memory, Kunsthalle Wien, Vienna, Austria, 2015
- Rare Earth, Thyssen-Bornemisza Art Contemporary, Vienna, Austria, 2015
- The Forces Behind The Forms, Galerie Taxispalais, Innsbruck, Austria, 2015
- The Forces Behind The Forms, Kunstmuseum Thun, Thun, Switzerland, 2016
- The Forces Behind The Forms, Kunstmuseen Krefeld, Museen Haus Lange and Haus Esters, Krefeld, Germany, 2016
- Nuit blanche, Villa Médicis, Rome, Italy, 2016
- Zeitgeist – Art Da Nova Berlim, Centro Cultural Banco do Brasil, Rio de Janeiro, Brazil, 2016
- +ultra. gestaltung schafft wissen, Martin-Gropius-Bau, Berlin, Germany, 2016
- Deep Inside, 5th Moscow International Biennale for Young Art, Moscow, Russia, 2016
- Hybrid Modus. Hybrid Modus New positions in bio-, living- and digital sculpture, Skulptur Bredelar 2016, Bredelar, Netherlands, 2016
- The End of the World, Centro per l'Arte Contemporanea Luigi Pecci, Prato, Italy, 2016
- Interractions n°4, Les Abattoirs, FRAC Midi-Pyrénées, Toulouse, France, 2016
- No One Belongs Here More Than You, Despacio, San José, Costa Rica, 2016
- The Antarctic Biennale, Antarctica, 2017
- Viva Arte Viva, 57th Venice Biennale, Venice, Italy, 2017
- Le Rêve des formes, Palais de Tokyo, Paris, France, 2017
- Produktion. Made in Germany Drei, Sprengel Museum, Hanover, Germany, 2017
- Tidalectics, TBA21-Augarten, Vienna, Austria, 2017
- De Nature en Sculpture, Villa Datris, Foundation pour la sculpture contemporaine, L'Isle sur la Sorgue, France, 2017
- Biotopia, Kunsthalle Mainz, Mainz, Germany, 2017
- Entangle / Physics and the Artistic Imagination, Bildmuseet, Umeå University, Sweden, 2018–2019
- Beobachtung, Dittrich & Schlechtriem, Berlin, Germany, 2017
- 57th International Art Exhibition: Viva Arte Viva, La Biennale di Venezia, Arsenale, Venice, Italy, 2017
- Notes on our Equilibrium, CAB Art Center, Brussels, Belgium, 2017
- Post-Nature, A Museum as an Ecosystem, Taipei Biennial, Taipei Fine Arts Museum, Taipei, Taiwan, 2018
- Entangle/Physics and the Artistic Imagination, Bildmuseet Umea, Sweden, 2018
- Adapt to Survive: Notes from the Future, Concrete, Dubai, United Arab Emirates, 2018
- Wildnis, Schirn Kunsthalle Frankfurt, Frankfurt, Germany, 2018
- Paradise, Wesport Arts Center, Wesport, USA, 2018
- Everything Was Forever, Until It Was No More – 1st Riga Biennial, Former Faculty of Biology of the University of Latvia, Riga, Latvia, 2018
- Adapt to Survive: Notes from the Future, Hayward Gallery's HENI Project Space, Southbank Centre, London, UK, 2018
- WATER, Queensland Art Gallery of Modern Art, Queensland, Australia, 2019
- El cuarto mundo – 14 Bienal de Artes Mediales de Santiago, Museu de Arte Contemporaneo, Santiago, Chile, 2019
- Nowness Experiments: The Mesh, K11 Art Foundation, Shanghai, China, 2019
- Gaïa, que deviens-tu?, Maison Guerlain, Paris, France, 2019
- The Drowned World, Ontario Place Cinesphere; Toronto Biennial of Art, Toronto, Canada, 2019
- Tomorrow is the Question, ARoS Aarhus Kunstmuseum, Aarhus, Denmark, 2019
- Art Basel 'With or Without People', Hong Kong Convention and Exhibition Centre, Wan Chai, China, 2019
- La Fabrique du Vivant, Centre Pompidou, Paris, France, 2019
- Bon Voyage! Reisen in der Kunst der Gegenwart, Ludwig Forum, Aachen, Germany, 2020
- Potential Worlds 2: Eco-Fiction, Migros Museum für Gegenwartskunst, Zurich, Switzerland, 2020
- Tiger in Space, Contemporary Art Museum of Estonia, Tallinn, Estonia, 2020
- STUDIO BERLIN, Berghain, Berlin, Germany, 2020
- Critical Zones, ZKM – Zentrum für Kunst und Medien, Karlsruhe, Germany, 2020
- La collection, Musée Cantonal des Beaux-Arts Lausanne, Lausanne, Switzerland, 2020
- (Un)endliche Ressourcen, Städtische Galerie Karlsruhe, Karlsruhe, Germany, 2020
- Of Roots and Clouds, Sapporo International Art Festival, Sapporo, Japan, 2020
- Angespannte Zustände, Staatsgalerie Stuttgart, Stuttgart, Germany, 2021
- Tonlagen, Hellerau European Centre of The Arts, Dresden, Germany, 2021
- Schweizer Skulpturen nach 1945, Aargauer Kunsthaus, Aarau, Switzerland, 2021
- Hans-Purrmann-Preis, Kulturhof Flachsgasse, Speyer, Germany 2021
- Biocenosis, Art of Change 21, Parc Chanot, Marseille, France 2021
- 5. Sammlungspräsentation, Philara Collection, Düsseldorf, Germany 2021
- Inventing Nature. Pflanzen in der Kunst, Staatliche Kunsthalle Karlsruhe, Karlsruhe, Germany 2021
- Scratching the Surface, Hamburger Bahnhof, Berlin, Germany 2021
- Climate Care – Reimagining Shared Planetary Futures, Vienna Biennial, MAK, Vienna, Austria 2021
- ISOLATION – Tree Analysis, Spiegelarche, Roldisleben, Germany, 2021
- How Will We Live Together? – The 17th International Architecture Exhibition, Venice, Italy
- Guangzhou Image Triennial 2021, Guangdong Museum of Art, Guangdong Province, China 2021
- Im Wald, Kunsthaus Grenchen, Grenchen, Switzerland 2021
- Prix Marcel Duchamp, Centre Pompidou, Paris, France 2021
