= Blue Star Contemporary =

Non-profit contemporary art institution located in San Antonio, Texas, U.S.

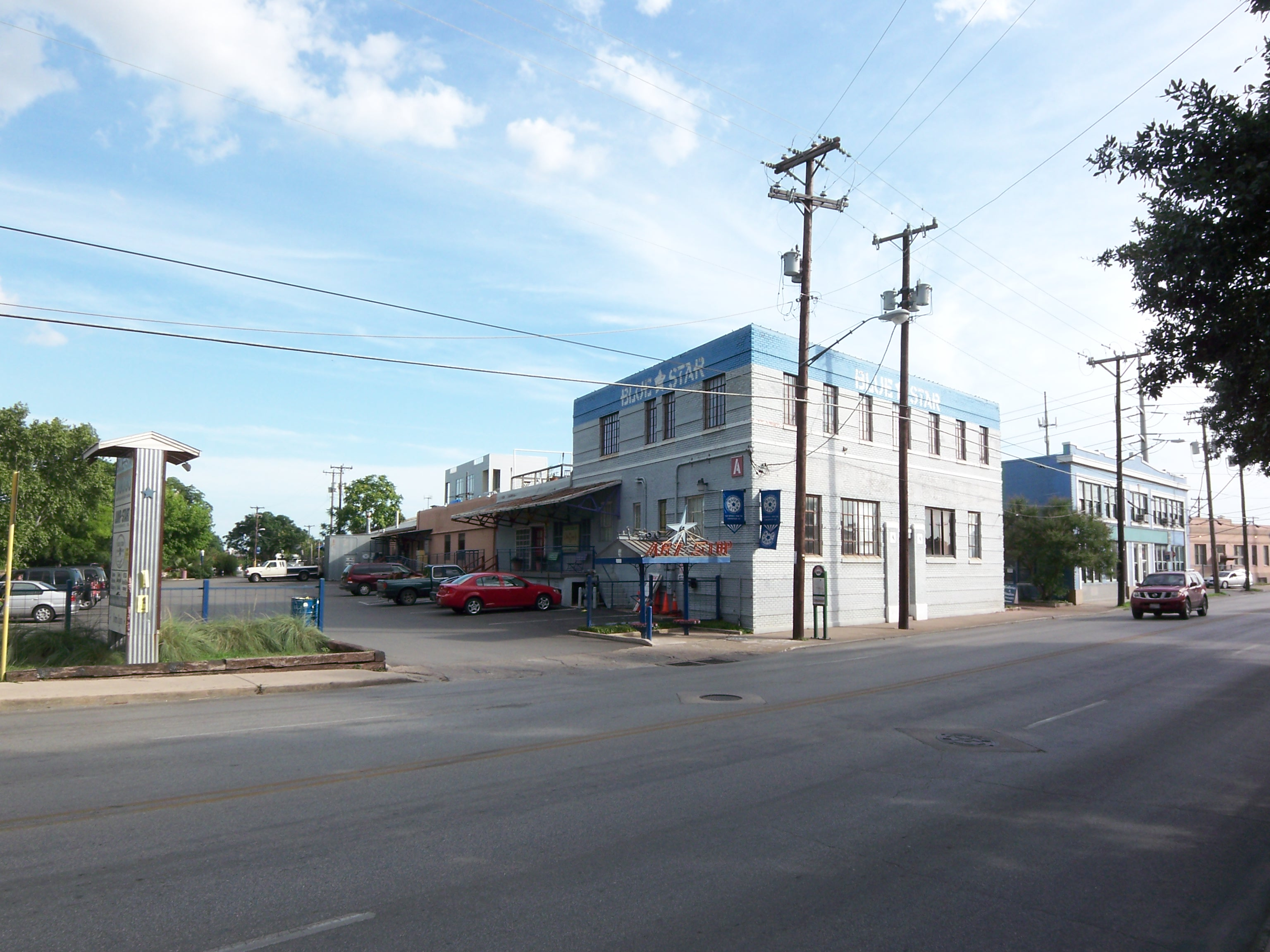
- Entrance to Blue Star Complex
- Established: 1986
- Location: 116 Blue Star San Antonio, Texas, U.S.
- Coordinates: 29.409692°N 98.495682°W
- Type: Contemporary Art
- Director: Mary Heathcott
- Website: www.bluestarart.org

Blue Star Contemporary, a non-profit, non-collectiong contemporary art institution that has utilized multiple names since its inception, changed its name to Contemporary at Blue Star in 2022. It is situated in a former warehouse that is part of a complex of former warehouses located in San Antonio, Texas, known as the Blue Star Art Complex. It is currently observing its 40th anniversary of staging exhibitions in the same building, which is divided into four galleries. The organization was established by a group of artists in 1986 after three local art galleries closed and the director of the San Antonio Museum of Art (SAMA) fired its contemporary art curator and cancelled an exhibition of 25 local artists that was to be called “San Antonio Contemporary.” According to ArtNexus, Blue Star's establishment "arose from the need to provide a platform for the work and ideas of local contemporary artists."

Local artists worked with local businessmen to raise $40,000 to bring the art space to fruition.

The first Blue Star Exhibition featuring the work of 27 local contemporary artists in the former Blue Star Ice and Cold Storage warehouse. This first exhibition, which, according to the San Antonio Express-News, had "modest" expectations, drew over three thousand visitors. In 2019, Glasstire referred to Blue Star as "an incubator for contemporary art," noting that it hosted "more than 20 exhibitions annually."

The complex of warehouses was originally created as part of a rail transportation hub, owned by the San Antonio Belt and Terminal Railway Company. The relative survival of this warehouse complex was recognized by the National Register of Historic Places in 1993. Developers Hap Veltman and Bernard Lifshutz, who continue to own the property, bought the land with the warehouses in 1985.

Blue Star had been run by volunteers until 1988, when the first professional staff members were hired. The current Executive Director is Mary Heathcott, who assumed the position in 2014. The space closed for five months for renovations in 2016 in preparation for its 30th anniversary.

Heathcott contrasts Blue Star to Artpace, another non-profit art space in San Antonio that was her previous employer: "this arts complex is a destination. There is more general attendance and opportunity to meet and talk with the public."

== Background ==
Contemporary at Blue Star is housed in a renovated warehouse in the Blue Star Arts Complex, a mixed-use development containing lofts, apartments, galleries, artist studios, retail stores, and restaurants. It is a part of the King Williams Cultural Arts District in the Southtown neighborhood and is located along the San Antonio River Walk.

The Blue Star Art Complex (including Contemporary at Blue Star) is at the center of San Antonio's First Friday Art Walk, an event that takes place on the first Friday of each month. It began in 1994, at the initiative of artist-run studios within the complex. It grew with the participation of artists and the Southtown Alliance Group, and it is said to be the oldest monthly art event in San Antonio. First Friday has been called "a lifeline and central hub for working artists," and, additionally, it has been written that "Many creative types are able to learn the business ropes by selling their art through the guidance of the First Friday community and Blue Star Arts Collective." It was described in MySA (a sister publication of the San Antonio Express-News) in 2025 as "a major cultural event located in the South Alamo corridor."

Contemporary at Blue Star is credited as being a revitalizing force for the arts district and surrounding neighborhoods. Contemporary Art Month (CAM), San Antonio's month-long celebration of local contemporary art, which originally took place in July, started in 1986 at what is now called Contemporary at Blue Star.

While the Contemporary at Blue Star remains in its original building, a number of artist-run spaces located in other warehouses closed as more commercial developments took place within the complex as a whole, as noted by MySA in 2013. The San Antonio Current also raised the commercialism issue in 2013: "there has long been confusion whether the project that began with a renegade art show 28 years ago would find its final allegiance with art or more prosaic commerce." At that time, then director Bill FitzGibbons said that "the Blue Star Contemporary Art Museum [as it was then known] is definitely recognized as the catalyst for making the area a cool, hip art district, and has helped significantly the adjacent real estate prices.”

== Programs ==
In 2016, programs included Creative Classrooms, a free six-week program that brings artists to school classrooms for weekly lessons, the MOSAIC Student Artist Program, a free after-school program for students interested in learning about the arts, and the Berlin Residency Program, a three-month residency at the Künstlerhaus Bethanien granted to four artists from Bexar County annually. Contemporary at Blue Star partnered with BiblioTech, Bexar County's digital library, to open a reading room in the museum's Arts Education Lab in 2016.

== Off-site art exhibitions ==
Art in the Garden is an ongoing partnership between Contemporary at Blue Star and the San Antonio Botanical Garden. Each year, an artist is selected and commissioned to create a site-specific work in the garden.

Blue Star Contemporary has also partnered with the City of San Antonio's Department of Arts and Culture's Public Art San Antonio division (PASA) to commission Plexus c18 at the San Antonio International Airport.
