= Mexic-Arte Museum =

Art museum in Austin, Texas

Coordinates: 30.2669°N 97.7429°W

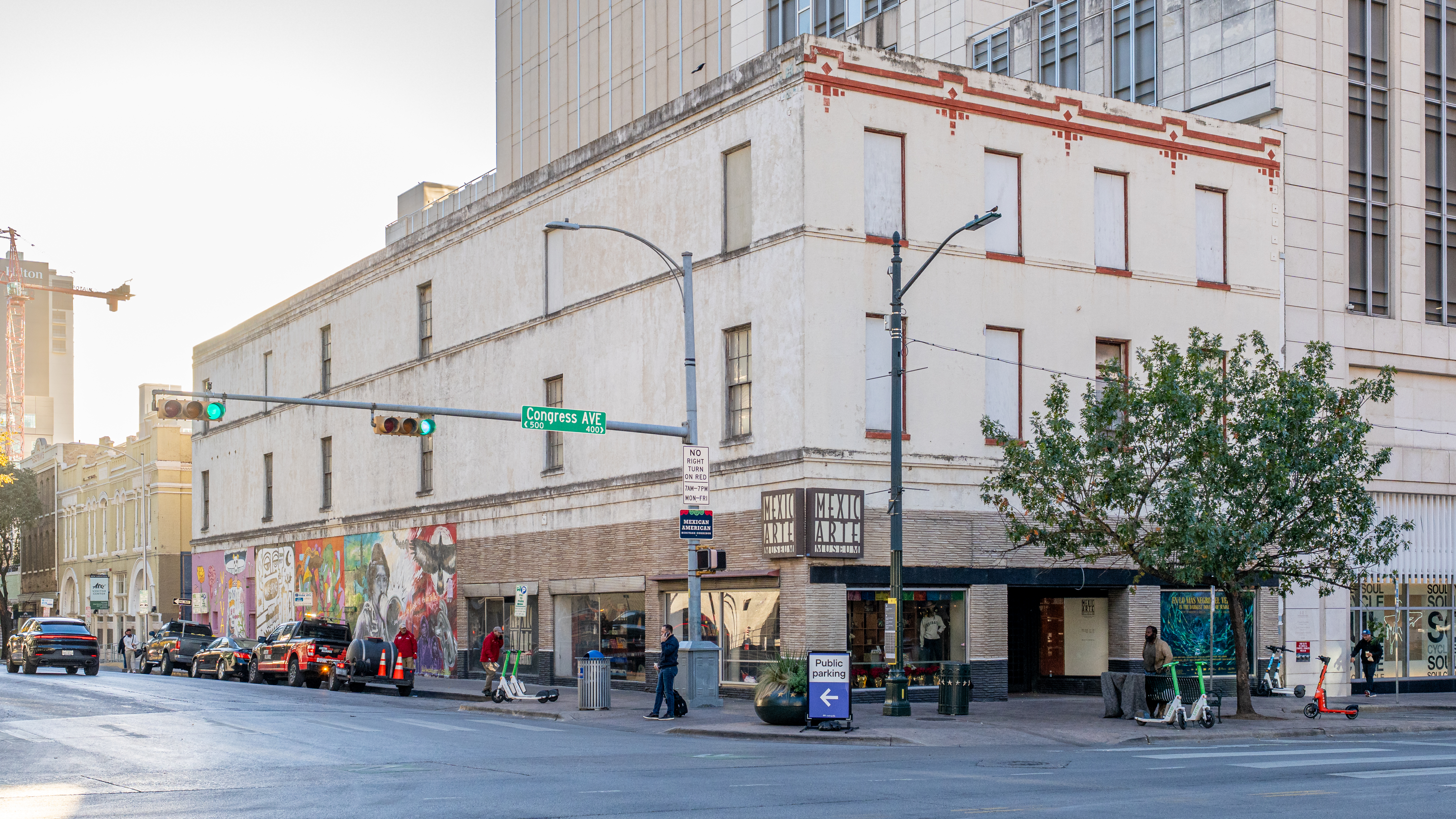
- Established: 1983
- Location: Austin, Texas
- Type: Fine arts museum
- Website: Mexic-Arte Museum official site

Mexic-Arte Museum is a fine arts museum in Austin, Texas. The Mission of the organization is to enrich and educate the community through the presentation and promotion of traditional and contemporary Mexican, and Latino art and culture.

Founded in 1983 and incorporated in 1984 by Sam Coronado and Sylvia Orozco, Mexic-Arte Museum is the Official Mexican American Fine Art Museum of Texas as per the 78th Texas legislature in 2003. Artist Pio Pulido was also a co-founder of Mexic-Arte Museum alongside Sylvia Orozco and Sam Coronado. In 1988, the museum relocated to its current location on Congress Avenue in Austin.

In 2016, the Screen It! program was one of twelve awardees of the National Arts & Humanities Youth Program Awards.
