= Sean Kelly Gallery =

Art gallery in New York City

Coordinates: 40.756251°N 73.998191°W

Sean Kelly Gallery, founded in 1991 in New York City by British-born Sean Kelly, represents established and mid-career artists, particularly with work based in installation and performance.

Owner Sean Kelly began in the British museum world by curating shows by sculptors such as Richard Deacon and Anthony Gormley early in their career. He opened a place in SoHo, Manhattan, in 1995, with artists such as Marina Abramović, Joseph Kosuth, James Casebere and Robert Mapplethorpe.

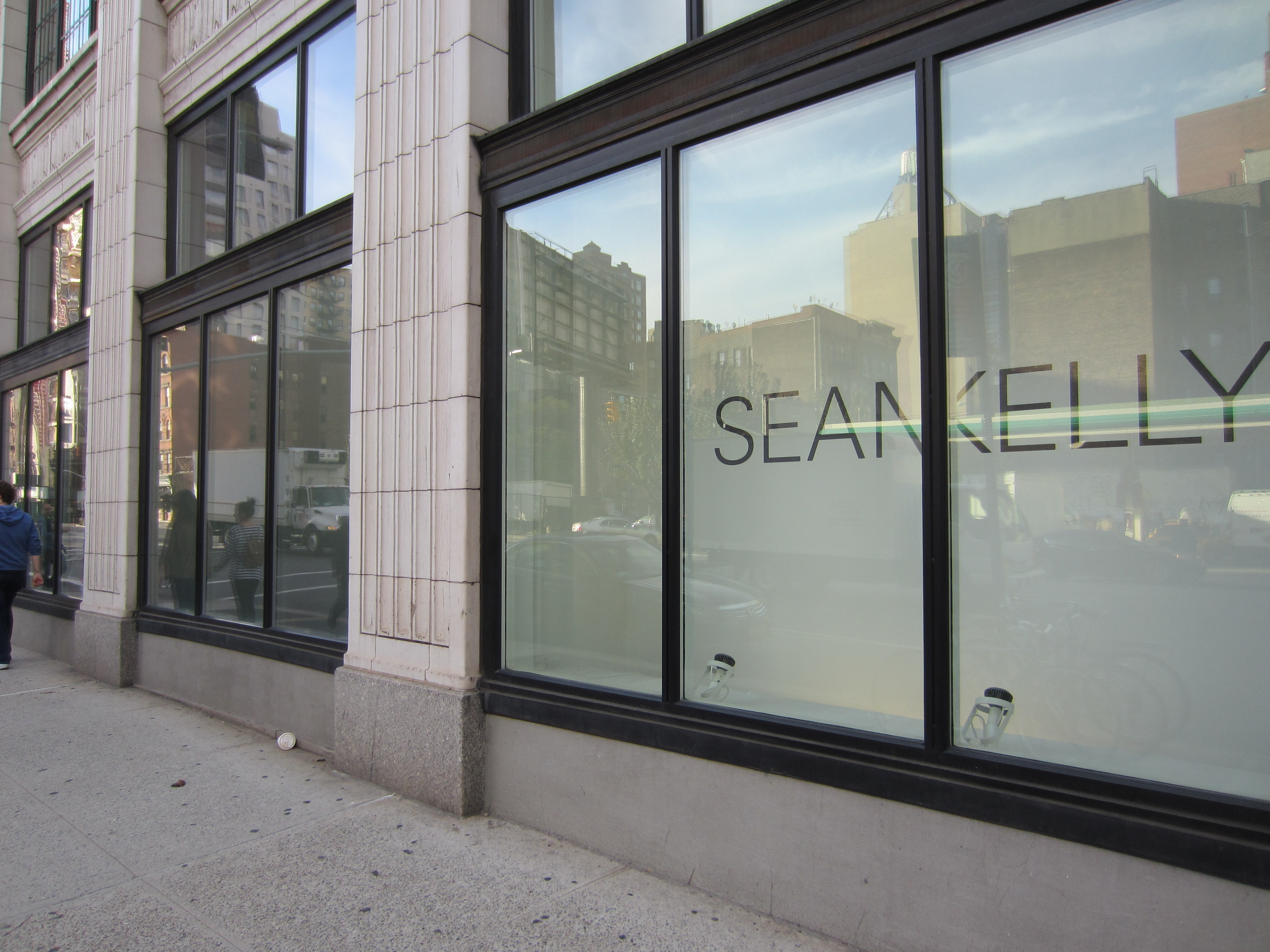
Outside the Sean Kelly Gallery

== History ==
The gallery was founded in 1991 and operated privately in SoHo, New York, until 1995. The original list of artists represented included Marina Abramović, Joseph Kosuth, James Casebere, Robert Mapplethorpe and Julião Sarmento, who are still represented by the gallery. In 1995, the gallery relocated to a street-level space in SoHo.

In 2001, Sean Kelly Gallery moved to 29th Street in the Chelsea gallery district. In 2012, it moved to a 22,000 sq ft (2,000 m^{2}) space in the new Hudson Yards neighborhood. The two story gallery was designed by architect Toshiko Mori.

In 2018, Sean Kelly Gallery launched an initiative called Collect Wisely, an advertisement- and event-driven campaign aimed at reinvigorating the collectors’ interest in actual art, including ads placed in various publications (including the New York Times) featuring phrases like “Will history remember you as an investor or a collector?” and a billboard near the gallery on 10th Avenue carrying the slogan “Connoisseurship is not a dirty word.” Another element of Collect Wisely was a series of invite-only salons held at the gallery, where people from a variety of backgrounds — collectors, but also writers, musicians and scientists — gathered for dinner and to discuss art’s emotional, rather than monetary, value. Also, Kelly launched the Collect Wisely podcast, in which he talks one-to-one with collectors like Pamela Joyner and J. Tomilson Hill about the essential values of art, their reasons for collecting and their cultural passions.

Also in 2018, the gallery opened a project space in Taipei.

In 2022, Sean Kelly Gallery opened its Los Angeles location at 1357 North Highland Avenue in Hollywood, expanding its exhibition program to the West Coast.

== Artists ==
Artists represented by the gallery include:

- Marina Abramović
- Dawoud Bey (since 2019)
- Los Carpinteros
- James Casebere
- Julian Charrière
- David Claerbout
- Jose Dávila
- Awol Erizku (since 2022)
- Leandro Erlich
- Iran do Espírito Santo
- Antony Gormley
- Laurent Grasso
- Johan Grimonprez
- Candida Höfer
- Rebecca Horn
- Tehching Hsieh
- Donna Huanca
- Callum Innes
- Idris Khan
- Joseph Kosuth
- Liu Wei
- Peter Liversidge
- Kris Martin (since 2019)
- Anthony McCall
- Hugo McCloud (since 2015)
- Landon Metz
- Mariko Mori
- Sam Moyer (since 2016)
- Shahzia Sikander (since 2017)
- Alec Soth
- Sun Xun
- Frank Thiel
- Janaina Tschäpe
- James White
- Kehinde Wiley

In addition, the gallery manages various artist estates, including:

- Ilse D'Hollander
- Poul Kjærholm
- Julião Sarmento
