= Zeno X =

Coordinates: 51°12′33.08″N 4°23′36.4″E

Zeno X is an art gallery founded in 1981 by Frank Demaegd and Eliane Breynaert, with a focus on mainly figurative painting within the contemporary art in Antwerp, Belgium.

== Artists ==
Artists represented by the gallery include:

- Michaël Borremans, painter and filmmaker
- Dirk Braeckman, photographer
- N. Dash
- Raoul De Keyser
- Stan Douglas, installation and video artist
- Marlene Dumas
- Yun-Fei Ji
- Mark Manders, installation - sculptor
- Martin Margiela
- Jockum Nordström
- Jenny Scobel, painter
- Luc Tuymans (since 1990)
- Patrick Van Caeckenbergh
- Anne-Mie Van Kerckhoven, multi-media artist
- Jack Whitten

On 2 July 2023 it was announced that the gallery will close
