= Villa Park (disambiguation) =

Villa Park is an association football stadium in Birmingham, England.

Villa Park may also refer to:

- Villa Park, California, a small city in Orange County
- Villa Park, Illinois, a suburb of Chicago in DuPage County
  - Villa Park station
- Villa Park, Denver, a neighborhood of Denver, Colorado
- Villa Park, Trenton, New Jersey, a neighborhood of Trenton, New Jersey
- Villa Park, Monmouth County, New Jersey, an unincorporated community in Spring Lake Heights
- Villapark, a neighborhood of Maastricht, Netherlands
