= Jan van Steffeswert =

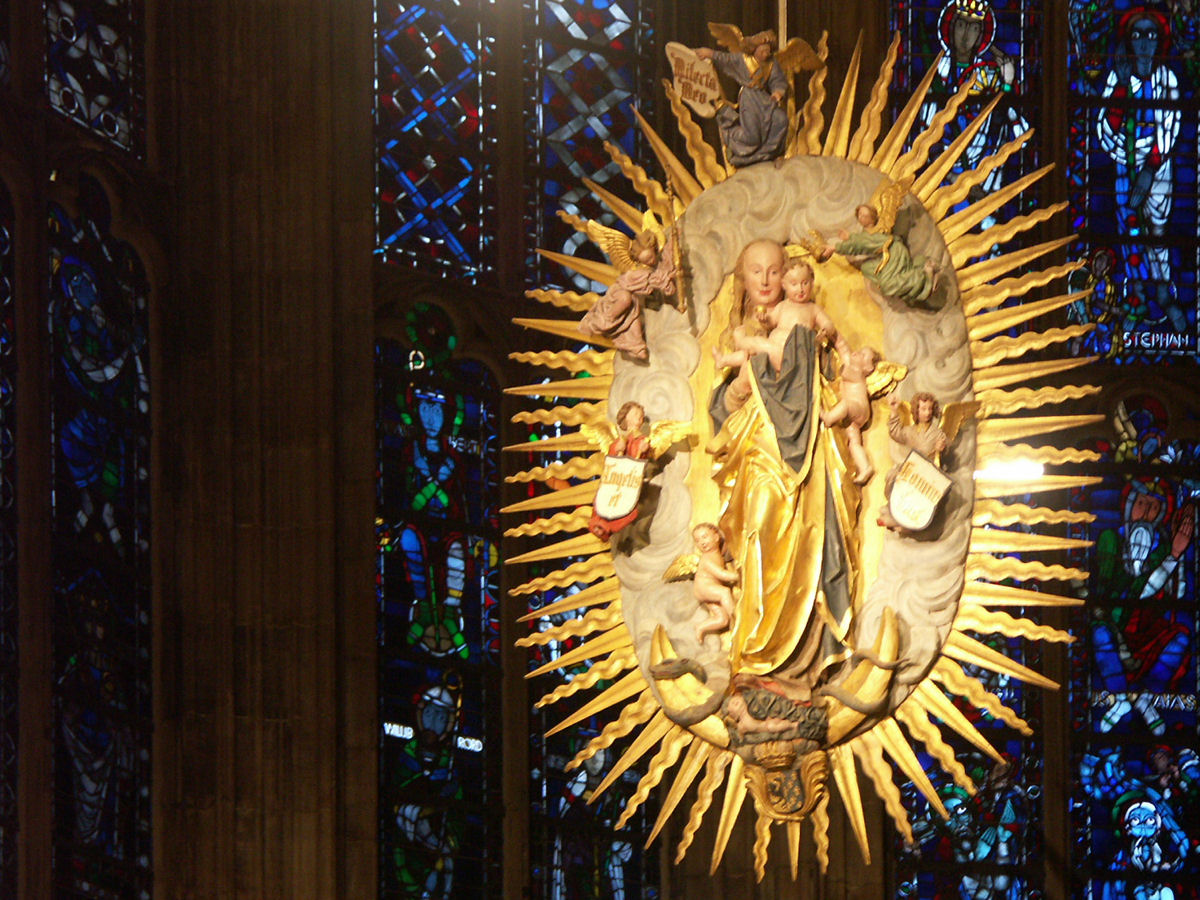
Jan van Steffeswert's Marianum in Aachen Cathedral

Jan van Steffeswert or alternatively Jan van Steffenswert or Jan van Stevensweert (c. 1460 – c. 1531) was an Early Netherlandish sculptor and wood carver based in Maastricht. Contrary to the customs of the time, he signed at least some of the works he produced, using variously Jan Bieldesnider, Jan van Weerd or Jan van Steffeswert. To date, fourteen works have been positively identified as his.

== Works ==
- Seated unidentified bishop – Bonnefantenmuseum, Maastricht, Netherlands.
- Saint Catherine of Alexandria – British Museum, London, England
- Iohannes in disco (head of Saint John the Baptist) – Curtius Museum, Liège, Belgium
- Marianum (German: Strahlenkranzmadonna) – Aachen Cathedral, Germany
- Saint Mary – Sint-Martinuskerk in Beek, Netherlands
- Saint Barbara – Sint-Martinuskerk, Born, Netherlands
- Saint Cecilia – St Matthiaskerk, Maastricht, Netherlands
- Saint Crispinianus – Church of Sint-Pieter beneden, Villapark, Maastricht, Netherlands
- Saint Hubertus – originally in the parish church of Erpekom, Peer, Belgium, now displayed in open air museum Bokrijk, Belgium
- Saint Joseph – Sint-Nicolaaskerk, Heythuysen, Netherlands
- The Virgin and Child with St. Anne – Bonnefantenmuseum, Maastricht, Netherlands.

== Gallery ==
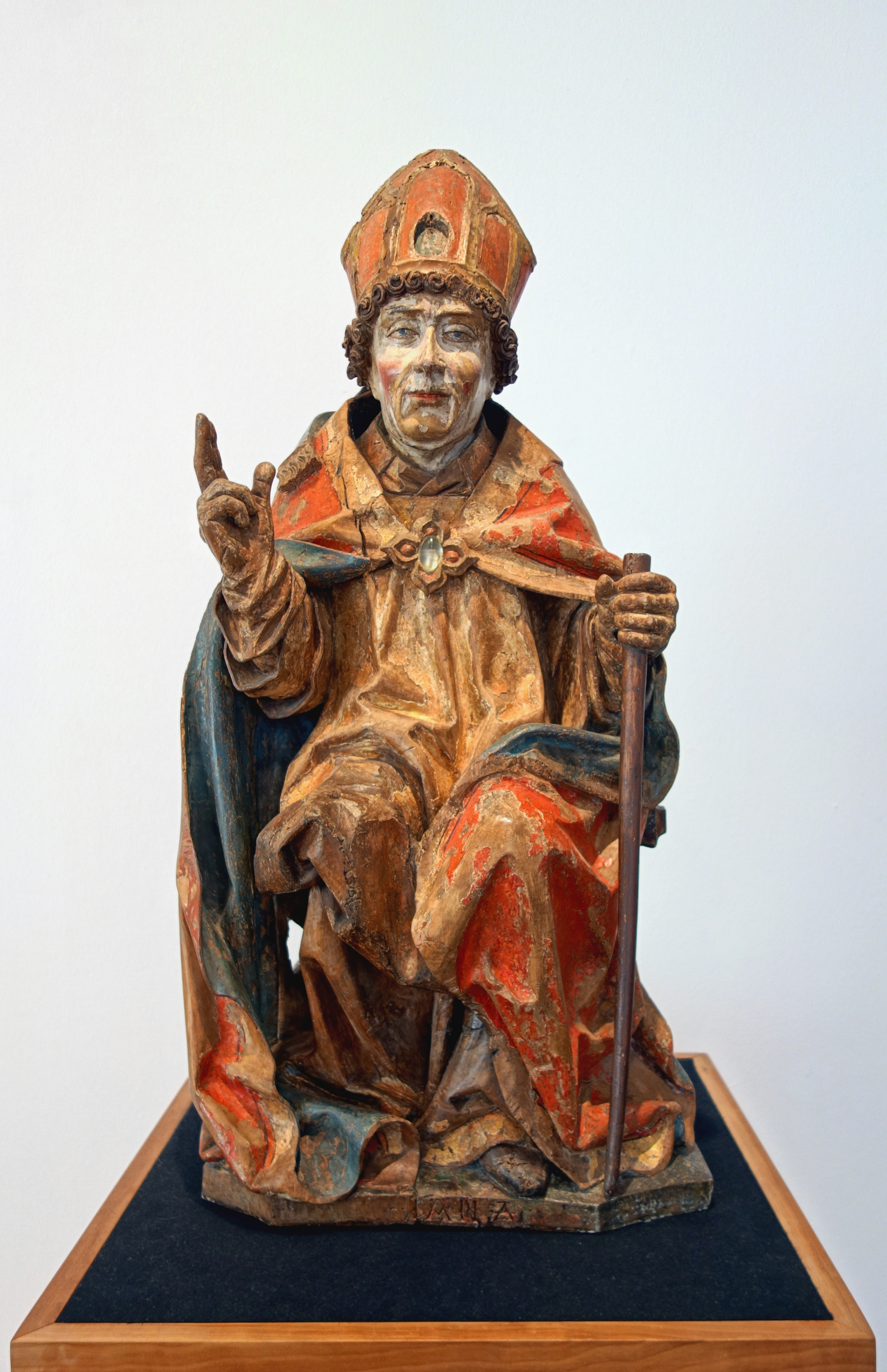
Bishop Sitting at Bonnefantenmuseum, Maastricht

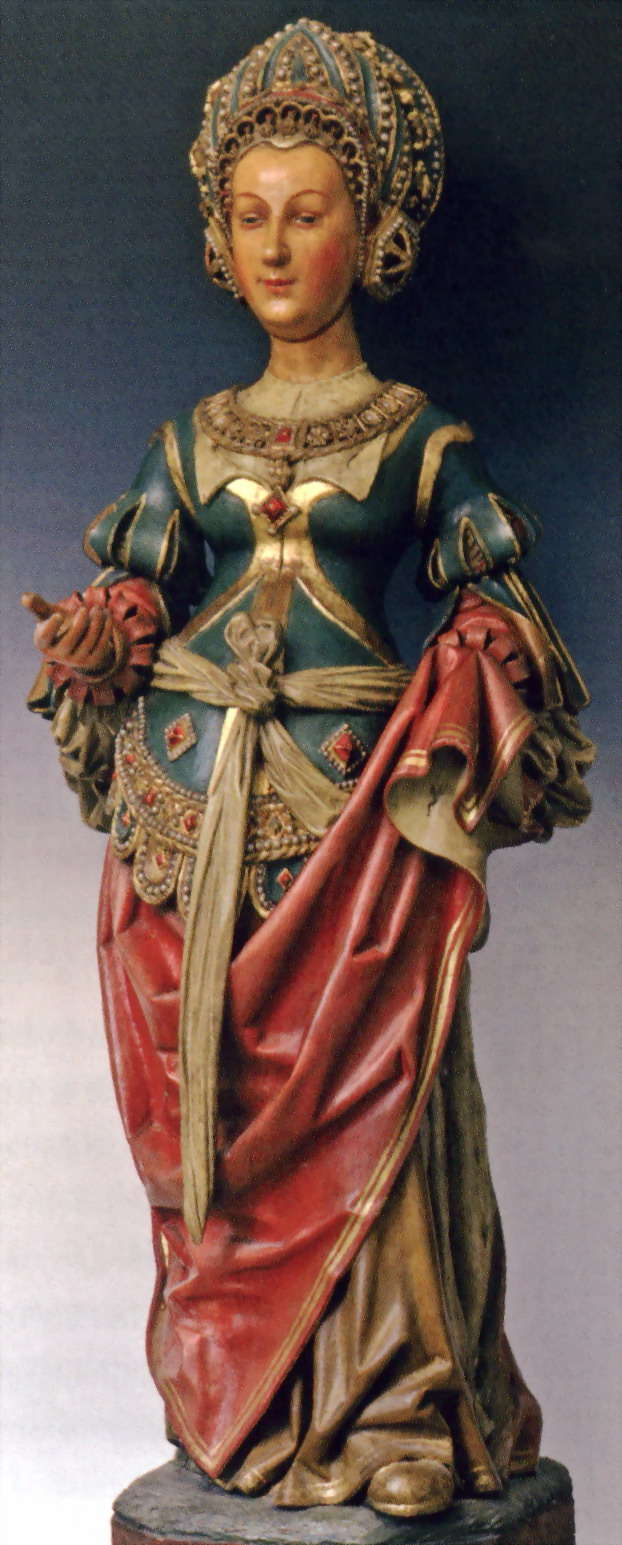
Saint Cecilia at St Matthiaskerk, Maastricht

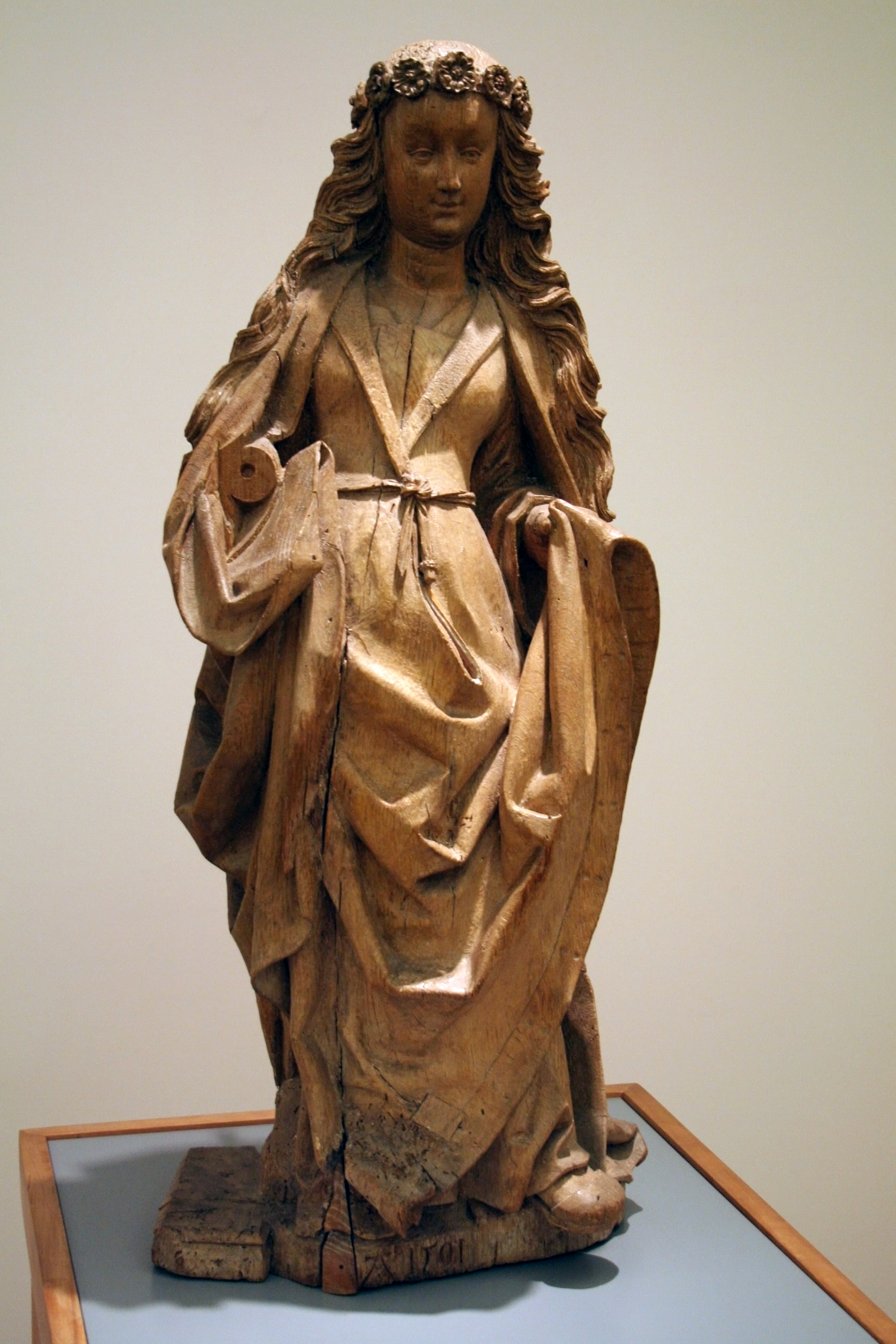
Saint (not identified)

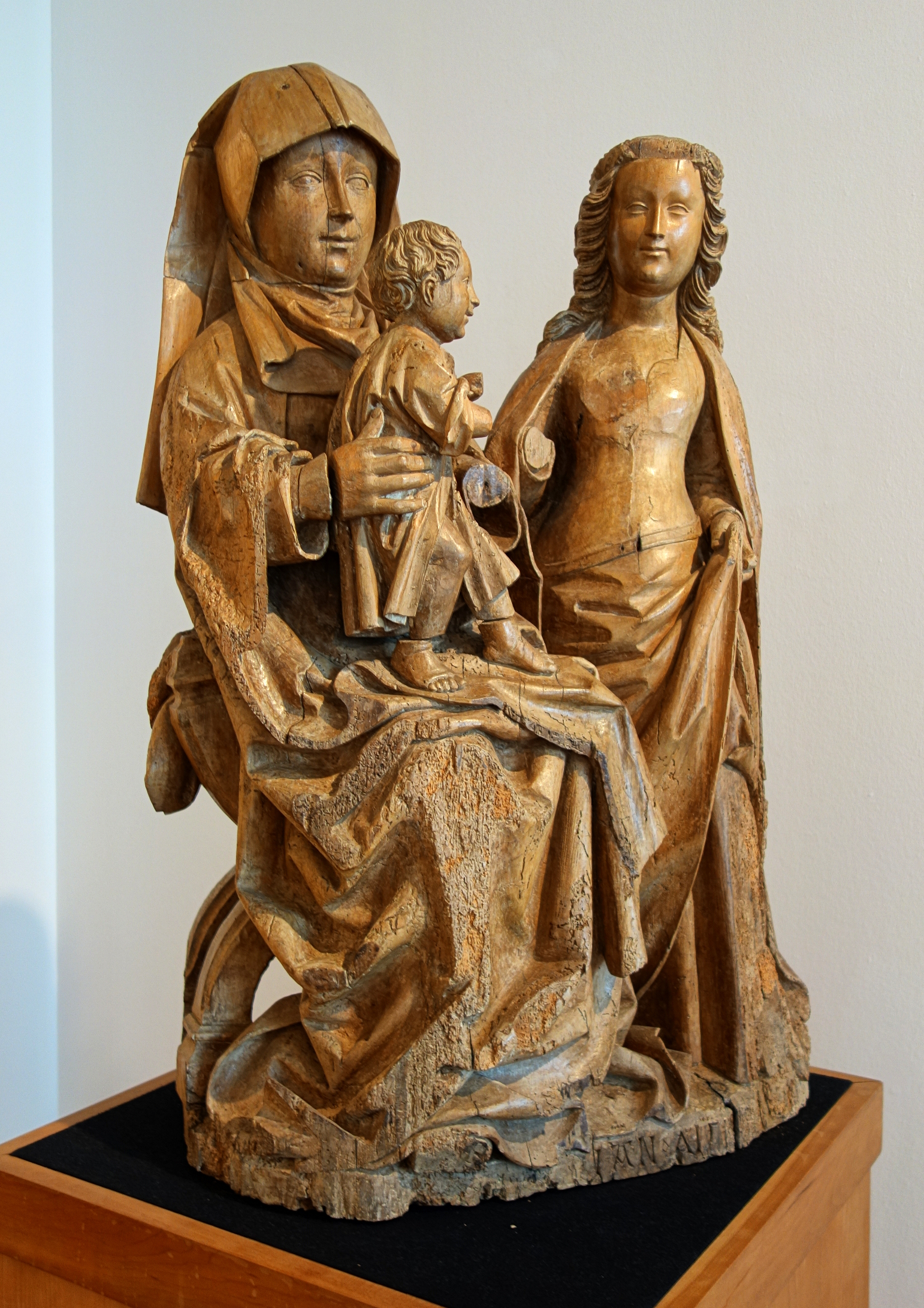
The Virgin and Child with St. Anne at Bonnefantenmuseum

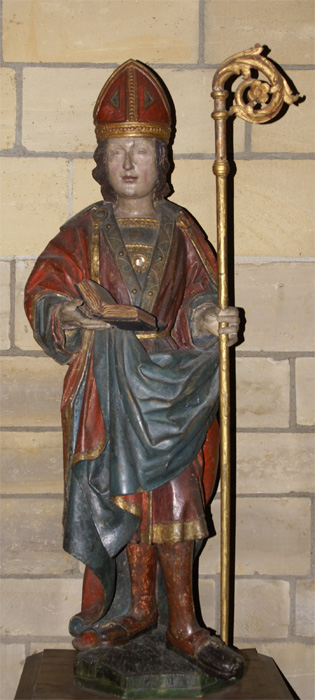
St. Crispinianus at Church of Sint-Pieter beneden, Maastricht

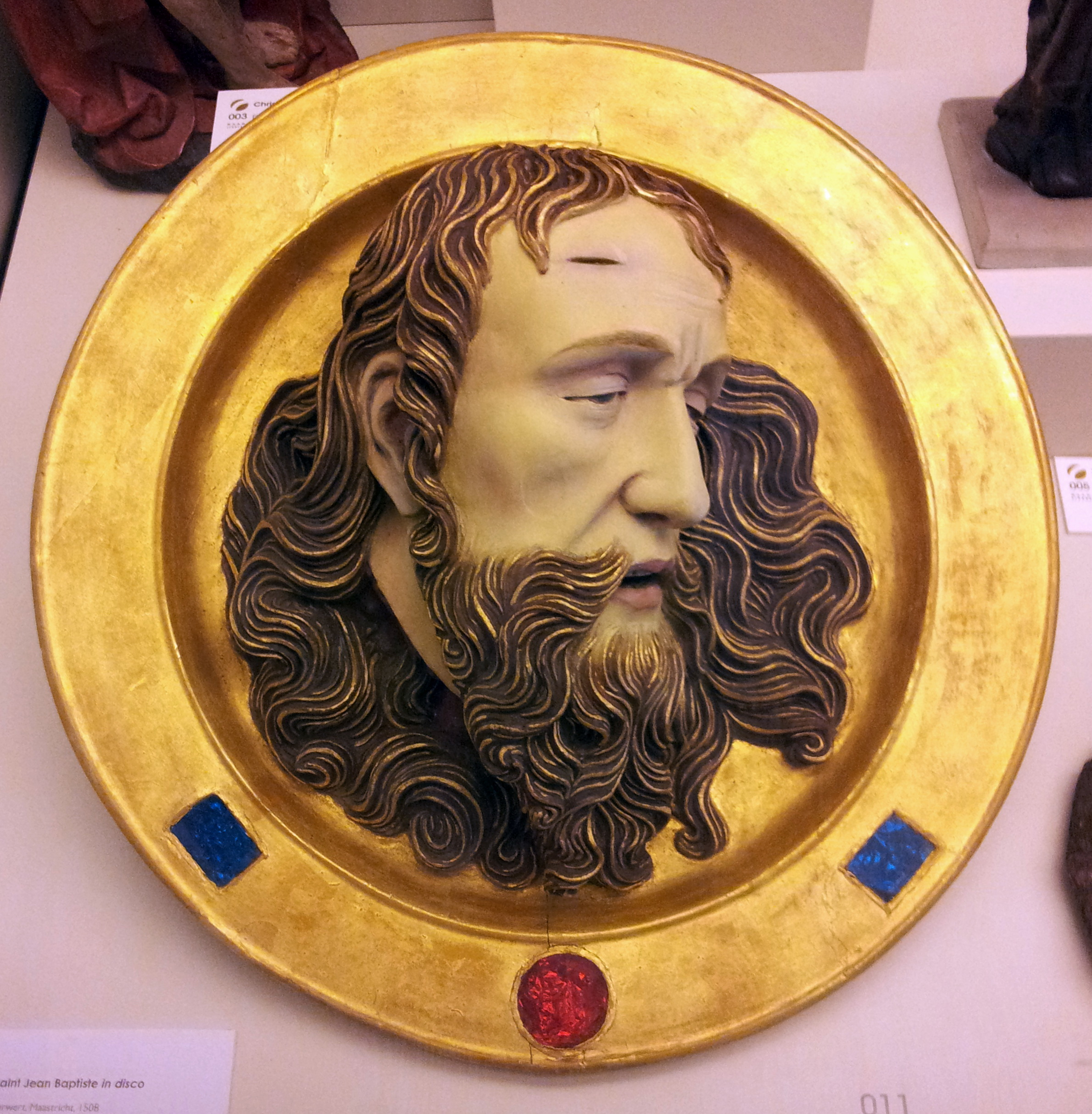
Johannes in discus, Curtius Museum, Liège

== Bibliography ==
- P. te Poel, Jan Van Steffeswert, Snoeck-Ducaji & Zoon, February 2001 ISBN 978-9053493359
