= Liza Lou =

American visual artist (born 1969)

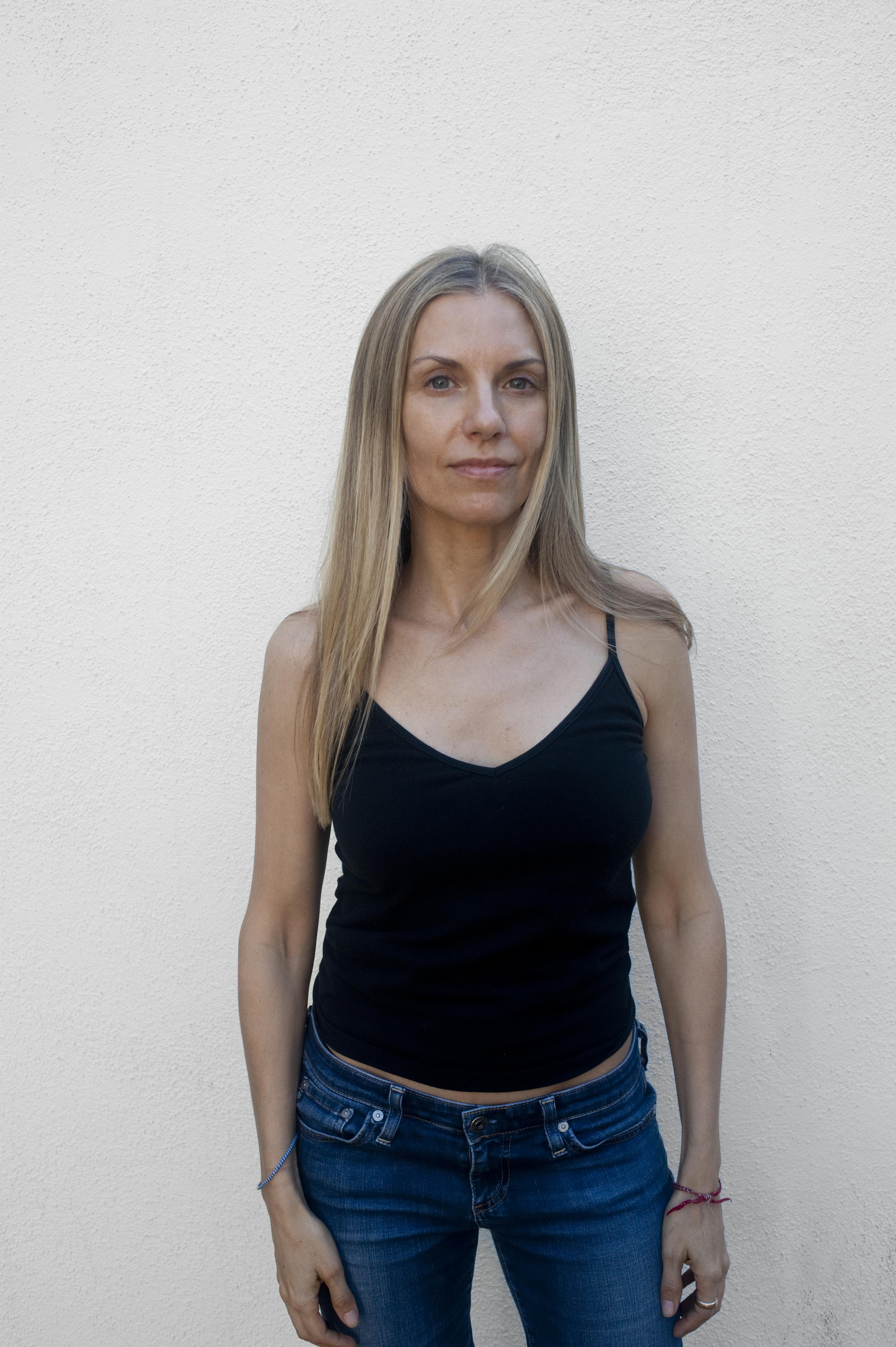
- Born: New York City, New York, U.S.
- Education: San Francisco Art Institute
- Notable work: Kitchen; Backyard; Continuous Mile; The Clouds
- Movement: sculpture, feminist art
- Awards: MacArthur Fellows Program; 2002; Anonymous Was A Woman Award; 2013
- Website: lizalou.com

Liza Lou (born 1969) is an American visual artist. She is best known for producing large scale sculpture using glass beads. Lou ran a studio in Durban, South Africa from 2005 to 2014. She currently has a nomadic practice, working mostly outdoors in the Mojave Desert in southern California. Lou's work is grounded in domestic craft and intersects with the larger social economy.

== Early life and education ==
Liza Lou was born in New York City, and raised in Los Angeles. Lou attended the San Francisco Art Institute in San Francisco, California, but dropped out in 1989 when it became evident her professors did not take her work with beads seriously.

== Career ==
=== Early career (1989-1996) ===
Lou came to prominence with the 168-square-foot (15.6 m^{2}) work Kitchen (1991–1996), a to-scale and fully equipped replica of a kitchen covered in beads. The work took five years to complete and was followed with Back Yard (1996–1999), for which Lou enlisted the help of volunteers to recreate grass in a 525-square-foot (48.8 m^{2}) model of a backyard.

Lou's career has subversively pushed the glass bead as a medium in art making from early representational works to more abstract works which evolved out of her time collaborating with skilled bead artisians in South Africa.

=== Durban, South Africa (2005–2014) ===
Lou's practice evolved from themes of labor and craft to include community. Her expansive practice formed out of necessity as many hands were needed to continue to weave and sew large scale beaded sculptures and installations. In 2005, Lou established a studio in Durban, South Africa, a complement to her studio in Los Angeles. Lou reached out to an organization called Aid to Artisans with an idea that her bead practice could provide income in high crises communities. Their dialog resulted in Lou's moving to Durban to work with a collective of Zulu women. At the time, Durban was the epicenter of the HIV epidemic and unemployment was as high as 70% in the townships. In Durban, Lou created many sculptures and paintings working "elbow-to-elbow" with 50 highly skilled South African Zulu beadworkers. Lou has said that working in Africa imparted to her the importance of how an artwork is made, in that the making cannot be separated from the meaning of the work.

Lou's work came to embrace process over concept as evidenced by her 2016 installation, The Waves. This work showcased a thousand white beaded dishcloth sized squares revealing marks from the hands that made them, as well as woven beads that are cracked, streaked, and stained. Lou credits the women from her Durban studio with expanding her sense of beauty. "I am touched by the beauty and grace of the women I have been privileged to work with, and by their joy and laughter."

=== Southern California (2014–present) ===
Lou returned to Los Angeles in 2014 but continued to run her Durban studio, commissioning woven panels and canvas that would be incorporated into her installations. Lou's current practice often finds her working outdoors in the solitude of the Mojave desert. Lou is revealing more of her own hand in newer works by incorporating painted gestural mark making. “[Solitude] has given me the opportunity to explore my own gesture in ways that I haven’t done in many many years.” Lou's solitary practice embodies a challenge to stay present and grounded in the silent labor of her work.

However, when the 2020 Pandemic required isolation and social distancing, Lou found enforced solitude onerous. She took to Instagram to invite the public to join her a in communal project called Apartogether, in which she prompted artists and the public to gather together materials and old clothes to piece together a quilt or more symbolically a "comfort blanket." She hosted artist talks and "sew-in" sessions via zoom to engage participants.

Her 2021 body of work "Desire Lines" features beaded sculptures that are monochromatic, echoing the Joshua Tree desert landscape where she often works "en plein air."

== Awards ==
Lou won the John D. and Catherine T. MacArthur Foundation Fellowship in 2002 and the Anonymous Was a Woman Artist Award in 2013.

== Notable works ==
=== Kitchen 1991-1996 ===
Lou single-handedly created this career launching installation throughout the first decade of her 20's. Kitchen is a 168-square-foot mosaiced fully furnished kitchen with millions of shimmering glass beads. The installation took her five years "and a few pair of tweezers" to complete. Components such as cereal flakes were fashioned with paper mache then coated with glue and glass beads. Kitchen is a statement on the invisible yet powerful value of women's labor. Kitchen questioned the ideas of 'women's work' just as the studded material challenged the distinction between 'serious; male art and women's arts and crafts.' The work was first shown in part as Kitchenette in 1994 at the California State University, Fullerton art gallery. Following a promising opening, Lou sent postcards of the installed work to American curators she admired. in 1995, Lou successfully captured the attention of Marcia Tucker, founder of the New Museum. Kitchen was first exhibited in its entirety at the New Museum in a 1996 group exhibition called "A Labor of Love." The experimental group show included 50 artists whose practice embraced labor-intensive process or craft in unique ways. Tucker assured Lou that her curatorial intention was not to reinforce stereotypes but to challenge "cherished hierarchies" by exhibiting work that pushed the boundaries of what makes a work "art." Kitchen continues to inspire conversations about craft, art, and feminism. Making Knowing: Craft in Art, 1950–2019, a group show at the Whitney Museum, displayed Kitchen after ten years in storage in another group show designed to bring awareness to the artists employing craft in their practice. The exhibition is organized by Jennie Goldstein, Assistant Curator, and Elisabeth Sherman, Assistant Curator, with Ambika Trasi, Curatorial Assistant. They state, "by highlighting marginalized modes of artistic production, these artists challenge the power structures that determine artistic value." After viewing the exhibition Garage Magazine journalist Sophie Kemp wrote that "Kitchen is a deeply campy and seductive piece of feminist art." Kitchen is in the permanent collection of the Whitney Museum of American Art in New York City.

=== Backyard 1996-1999 ===
Backyard is a 528 square foot installation of a garden featuring 250,000 blades of grass. Each 'blade' of grass is a wire strung with beads. This threading process would have taken Lou 40 years to complete the installation thus prompting Lou to break her solitary practice by inviting volunteers from the public to help. What struck Lou about the collaborative process is that everyone's threaded wire appeared slightly different even though they had the same materials and prompt. Backyard is in the permanent collection of the Fondation Cartier pour l'Art Contemporain, Paris.

=== Continuous Mile, 2006-2008 ===
In 2006, Lou started creating one of her most notable works, Continuous Mile, with help of a team of Zulu women. Continuous Mile is composed of more than 4.5 million black beads, sewn into ropes which are then coiled into a cylindrical shape. The theme of this work is "work," or process. As Lou states, "The idea was to employ as many people as possible, using the slowest possible technique in order to engage a community, and to build homes in the process of making an art work." This work was acquired by the Corning Museum of Glass in 2014.

=== The Clouds, 2015-2018 ===
For three years Lou collaborated with her Durban Studio artisans in South Africa to stitch together 600 hand sewn beaded cloths. The final installation consists of a 100 foot long canvas artwork titled “The Cloud.” This work originally debuted at the 21st Biennale of Sydney in 2018. Lou first incorporates oil paints into her practice with this work stating, "it's the first time I've made work where I've really shown my gesture." The Cloud also showcases a new technique in which Lou hammers the woven beaded cloths to reveal an underlying framework of frayed threads unraveling from their previous grid. This technique reveals the dedicated labor required to produce a seemingly perfect hand sewn beaded cloth. Lou describes this method as evolving out of exploring the question, 'what can the beads do, that paint can't do.' The Clouds is notable in that it pushes the boundaries between painting and sculpture.

== Solo exhibitions ==
- 1994: Kitchenette, California State University Art Gallery, Fullerton, CA
- 1995: Socks and Underwear, Franklin Furnace, New York, NY
- 1996: Liza Lou, John Natsoulas Gallery, Davis, CA
- 1996: Liza Lou, Center for Creative Studies, Detroit, MI
- 1996: Liza Lou, Capp Street Projects, San Francisco, CA
- 1996: Forty-two American Presidents, Quint Gallery, San Diego, CA
- 1996: Kitchen, Minneapolis Institute of Arts, Minneapolis, MN
- 1997: American Presidents 1-42, Quint Gallery, San Diego, CA
- 1997: American Presidents 1-42, California Center for the Arts Museum, Escondido, CA
- 1997: American Presidents 1-42, Hudson River Museum of Westchester, Yonkers, NY
- 1998: Most Admired Disorder, Haines Gallery, San Francisco, CA
- 1998: Portrait Gallery, P.P.O.W., New York, NY
- 1998: Backyard, Fundació Joan Miró, Espai 13, Barcelona, Spain
- 1998: Kitchen and Backyard, Santa Monica Museum of Art, Santa Monica, CA
- 1998: Liza Lou, Kemper Museum of Contemporary Art, Kansas City, MO
- 1998: Portrait Gallery, Aspen Art Museum, Aspen, CO
- 1998: Liza Lou, Bass Museum of Art, Miami, FL
- 1999: Kitchen, University of Wyoming Art Museum, Laramie, WY
- 1999: American Presidents 1-42, Contemporary Arts Center of Virginia, Virginia Beach, VA
- 1999: Kitchen, Contemporary Art Center, Cincinnati, OH
- 1999: American Glamorama, Grand Central Terminal, Vanderbilt Hall, New York, NY
- 2000: Liza Lou, Akron Art Museum, Akron, OH
- 2000: American Presidents 1-43, Renwick Gallery, Smithsonian Institution of American Art, Washington, D.C.
- 2001: Trailer, Southeastern Contemporary Art Center, Winston-Salem, NC
- 2001: Liza Lou II, Bass Museum of Art, Miami, FL
- 2002: Leaves of Glass, Henie Onstad Kunstsenter, Oslo, Norway
- 2002: Liza Lou, Museum Kunst Palast, Düsseldorf, Germany
- 2002: Testimony, Deitch Projects, New York, NY
- 2004: The Damned, Galerie Thaddaeus Ropac, Paris, France
- 2006: Liza Lou, White Cube, London, UK
- 2008: Maximum Security, Lever House, New York, NY
- 2008: Liza Lou, L&M Arts, New York, NY
- 2010: American Idol, Galerie Thaddaeus Ropac, Paris
- 2010: Liza Lou Drawings, Galerie Thaddaeus Ropac, Paris
- 2011: Liza Lou, L&M Arts, Los Angeles, LA
- 2011: Liza Lou: Let the Light In, SCAD Museum of Art, Savannah, GA
- 2012: Liza Lou, White Cube, London, UK
- 2013: Color Field, Museum of Contemporary Art San Diego, San Diego, CA
- 2014: Canvas, Goodman Gallery, Johannesburg, South Africa
- 2014: ixube, Galerie Thaddaeus Ropac, Paris, France
- 2014: Solid/Divide, White Cube, Bermondsey, London, England
- 2015: Liza Lou, Wichita Art Museum, Wichita, KS
- 2015: Color Field and Solid Grey, Neuberger Museum of Art, Westchester, New York, NY
- 2016: Liza Lou, The Waves Galerie Thaddaeus Ropac, Salzburg, Austria
- 2017: ingxube Lehmann Maupin Gallery, Hong Kong, China
- 2018: Classification and Nomenclature of Clouds Lehmann Maupin, New York, NY
- 2019: The River and the Raft, Lehmann Maupin, London, UK
- 2021: Both Sides, Now, Lehmann Maupin, Palm Beach, FL
- 2021: Desire Lines, Lehmann Maupin, London, UK
