= Shirazeh Houshiary =

Iranian installation artist and sculptor

Shirazeh Houshiary RA
- Born: January 15, 1955 (age 71); Shiraz, Iran
- Education: Chelsea School of Art
- Occupations: Sculptor, installation artist, painter
- Website: www.shirazehhoushiary.com

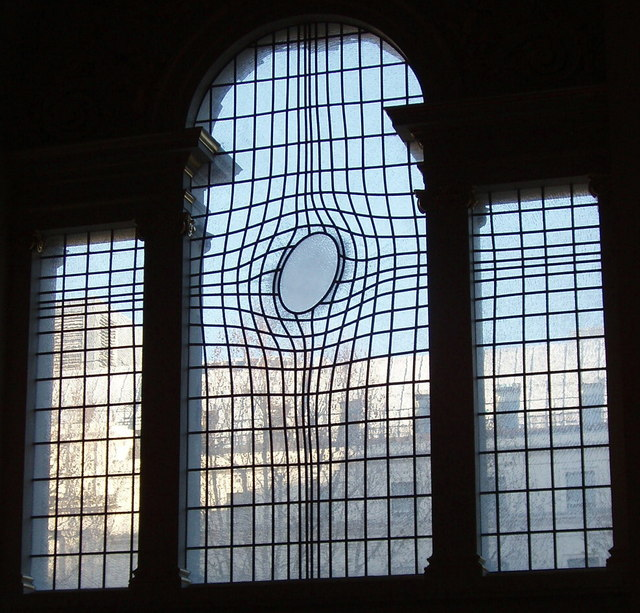
New East Window of St Martin-in-the-Fields (2008) by Shirazeh Houshiary

Shirazeh Houshiary RA (Persian: شیرازه هوشیاری; born 15 January 1955) is an Iranian-born English sculptor, installation artist, and painter. She lives and works in London.

== Life and work ==
Shirazeh Houshiary was born on 15 January 1955 in Shiraz, Iran. She left her native country of Iran in 1973. Houshiary attended Chelsea School of Art in London, from 1976 to 1979. She was a Cardiff College of Art junior fellow, from 1979 to 1980.

Houshiary was identified with other young sculptors of her generation such as Richard Deacon and Anish Kapoor, but her work was distinct from theirs in the strong Persian influence which it displayed, though sharing with Kapoor a spiritual concern. Her ideology draws on Sufi mystical doctrine and Jalal ad-Din Muhammad Rumi, a Persian mystic and poet from the 13th century.

She was a nominee for the 1994 Turner Prize. In 2008, the St Martin-in-the-Fields Church in London unveiled a commission by Shirazeh Houshiary and Pip Horne for the East Window.

In 2005, Creative Time commissioned Houshiary and Pip Horne for their Creative Time Art on the Plaza series where the monumental Breath tower was exhibited in New York City. Her work was also included in Feri Daftari's exhibition Without Boundary: Seventeen Ways of Looking at the Museum of Modern Art in 2006 and the 17th Biennale of Sydney in 2010.

In 2005 (Veil), 2008 (Shroud), 2011 (Dust), and 2019 (A Cup and a Rose) Houshiary worked with animator Mark Hatchard of Hotbox Studios to create animations for gallery installations at the Lehmann Maupin Gallery in New York and the Lisson Gallery in London.

Houshiary's work is included in numerous public and private collections including the Museum of Modern Art (MoMA), the Metropolitan Museum of Art, Solomon R. Guggenheim Museum, and the Tate.

== Exhibitions ==
=== Solo exhibitions ===
Select solo exhibitions:

- Shirazeh Houshiary, Lisson Gallery, London (1984)
- Shirazeh Houshiary, Museum of Modern Art, Oxford & Centre d'Art Contemporain, Geneve (1988)
- Dancing Around My Ghost, Camden Arts Centre, London (1988)
- Turning Around the Centre, University Gallery, University of Massachusetts, Amherst (1993)
- Conversation with Shirazeh Houshiary and Stella Santacatterina, published on the occasion of an exhibition held at the Lisson Gallery, London, (reprinted from Third Text, no. 27) (1994)
- Isthmus: Shirazeh Houshiary (Grenoble: Magasin-Centre National d'Art Contemporain de Grenoble; London: the British Council) (1995)

=== Group exhibitions ===
Select group exhibitions:

- New Art at the Tate Gallery, Tate Gallery, London (1983)
- The Sculpture Show, Hayward and Serpentine Galleries, London (1983)
- The British Art Show, Art Council Touring Exhibition (1984)
- The British Show, Art Gallery of New South Wales, Sydney (1985)
- Magiciens de la Terre, Centre Georges Pompidou, Paris (1989)
- In Site: New British Sculpture, Museet for Samtidskunst, Oslo (1993)
- Recent British Sculpture, City Museum and Art Gallery, Derby (1993)
- The Turner Prize, Tate Gallery, London (1994)
- Sculptors' Drawings Presented by the Weltkunst Foundation (1994)
- Contemporary British Art in Print, Scottish National Gallery, Edinburgh (1995)

== See also ==
- List of Iranian women artists
