= David Maupin =

American gallery director

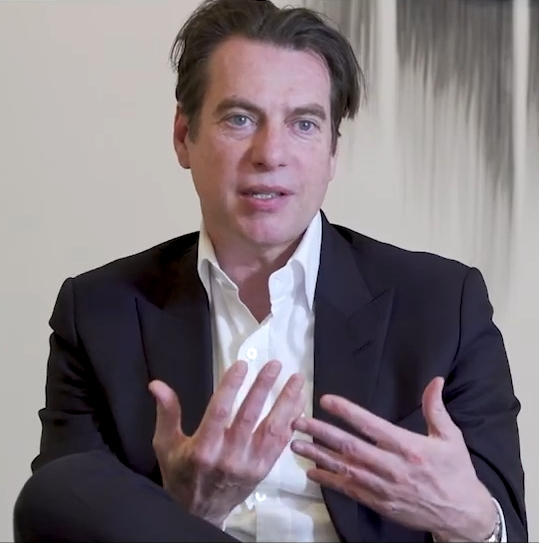
Maupin in 2018

David Maupin is an American art dealer.

With Rachel Lehmann, he opened the Lehmann Maupin gallery in SoHo, Manhattan, in October 1996. Before opening Lehmann Maupin, Maupin was the director of Metro Pictures.

== Early life and education ==
Born in California, Maupin studied art history at the University of California, Berkeley, and the University of Pennsylvania. He studied in Florence during his university year abroad and completed an internship at the Peggy Guggenheim Collection in Venice.

== Lehmann Maupin gallery ==
=== History ===
Lehmann Maupin gallery has organized and curated exhibitions for international contemporary artists working in all media. The gallery has given a number of artists their first one-person exhibitions in New York City, including Kutluğ Ataman, Tracey Emin, Anya Gallaccio, Shirazeh Houshiary, Do-Ho Suh, and Adriana Varejão. In addition, the gallery has exposed emerging talents, such as Suling Wang, Teresita Fernández, and the Japanese artist Mr., through exhibitions at the gallery and participation in select art fairs.

The gallery's first raw, plywood-panelled space in Chelsea was designed by Rem Koolhaas in 1996. It was a 3,500-square-foot (330 m^{2}) storefront gallery located at 39 Greene Street (near Grand Street). In September 2002 the gallery moved to a bigger space, also located in Chelsea. A second New York gallery at 201 Chrystie Street opened in November 2007. In 2013, Koolhaas designed a 105-square-metre (1,130 sq ft) gallery space in the historic Pedder Building in Hong Kong. The inaugural exhibition featured Korean artist Lee Bul.

Ahead of the inaugural Art Basel Hong Kong in 2013, Maupin joined the fair's selection committee.

Lehmann Maupin launched its first Seoul outpost in the city's Sogyeok-dong neighbourhood in 2017, making it one of the first international galleries to establish a permanent space in South Korea. After four years, the gallery moved to a larger gallery in the Hannam-dong area.

Lehmann Maupin's current three-story gallery space, designed by Peter Marino, opened in Chelsea in September 2018. Shortly after, the gallery inaugurated its nearly 2,000 square feet (190 square metres) black box space for film screenings.

In 2019, Lehmann Maupin launched operations London before opening a 730 square feet (68 square metres) space in the South Kensington district in 2020.

In addition, the gallery has had seasonal spaces in Aspen, Beijing, Palm Beach (2020), Taipei (2021) and Milan (2024).

=== Artists ===
Lehmann Maupin represents numerous living artists, including:

- Hernan Bas
- Loriel Beltrán (since 2023)
- McArthur Binion
- Dominic Chambers (since 2021)
- Billy Childish
- Mary Corse
- Mandy El-Sayegh (since 2019)
- Tracey Emin
- Gilbert & George
- Todd Gray
- Shirazeh Houshiary
- Kim Yun Shin
- Catherine Opie (since 2015)
- Tony Oursler
- Helen Pashgian (since 2019)
- Lari Pittman (since 2019)
- Alex Prager
- David Salle
- Sung Neung Kyung (since 2023)
- Do Ho Suh
- Patrick Van Caeckenbergh (since 2014)
- Cecilia Vicuña
- Nari Ward
- Billie Zangewa (since 2020)
- Anna Park (since 2025)

In addition, the gallery manages various artist estates, including:

- Ashley Bickerton
- Heidi Bucher

Artists with whom the gallery has worked in the past include:

- Lee Bul (–2025)

== Personal life ==
Maupin's partner is Stefano Tonchi, the editor-in-chief of the magazine W; they met in 1987 when Maupin was studying in Florence. The couple has twin daughters. Since 2011, the family has been residing at Osborne Apartments, in a space designed by Annabelle Selldorf. They also maintain a weekend house in Bridgehampton.
