= The Virgin and Child with St. Anne (van Steffeswert) =

Sculpture by Jan van Steffeswert

Coordinates: 50.8428°N 5.7025°E

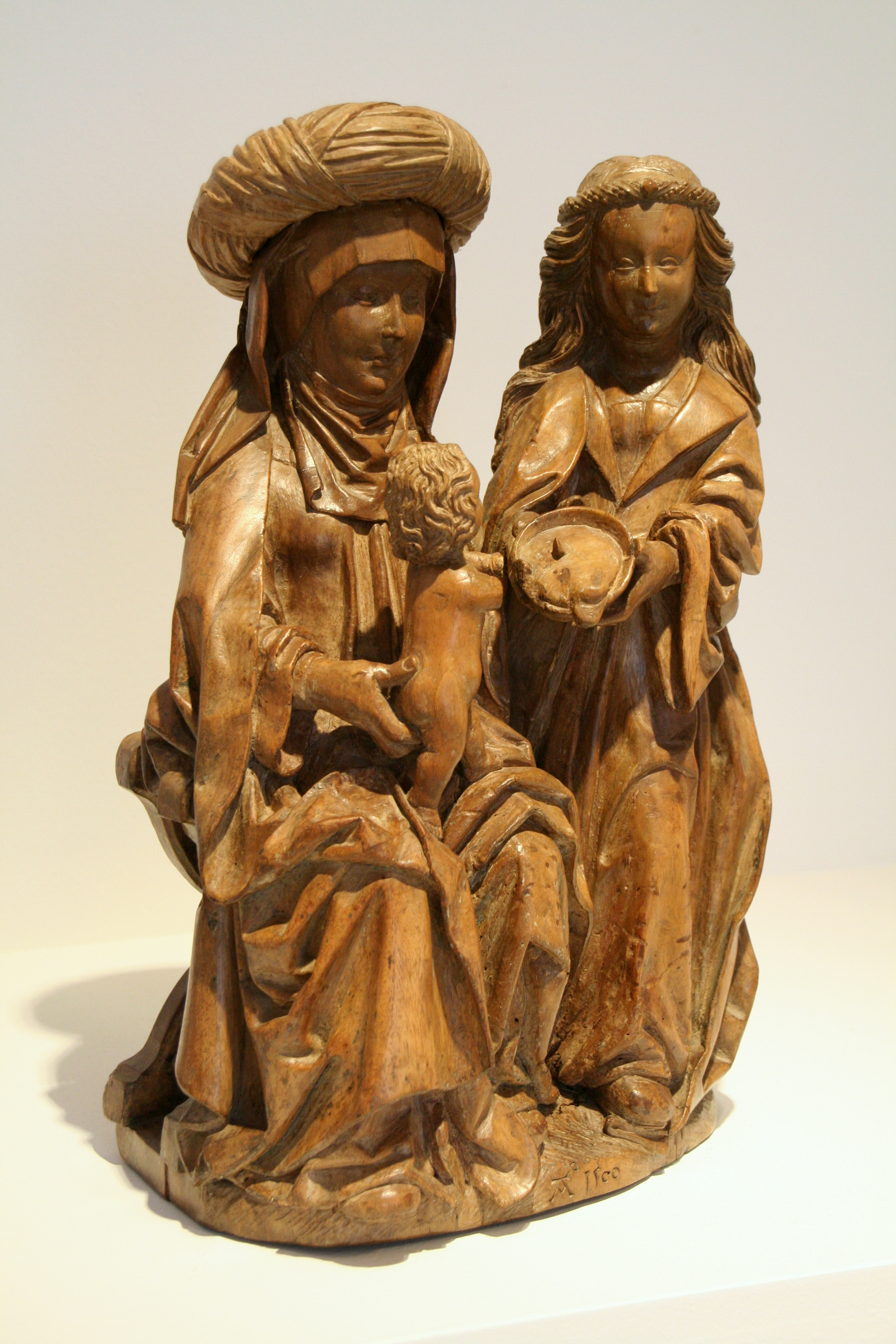
- Artist: Jan van Steffeswert (attr.)
- Year: 1500
- Medium: Juglans regia (walnut)
- Subject: The Virgin and Child with St. Anne
- Dimensions: 44.2 cm (17.4 in)
- Location: Bonnefantenmuseum; Maastricht

The Virgin and Child with St. Anne (Dutch: Sint Anna te Drieën) by Jan van Steffeswert refers to two wooden sculptures in the Bonnefantenmuseum in Maastricht, the Netherlands. One is unsigned and dated 1500, the other one is signed and dated but difficult to decipher (1511?). Jan van Steffeswert (ca. 1460–1530) was a woodcarver from the Netherlands who worked in Maastricht in the late 15th and early 16th century.

== Unsigned sculpture ==
Depictions of Christ Child with his mother and grandmother were popular in the late Middle Ages. The scene frequently shows Mary and Christ reading. In the unsigned sculpture in the Bonnefantenmuseum, the child is shown grasping a bowl of porridge. Due to the relatively small size and the emphasis on domesticity, it has been suggested that the sculpture had been commissioned for a home rather than a church. The Bonnefantenmuseum acquired it in 1993 from the parish church of Saint Martin in Eijsden, close to Maastricht.

The sculpture is dated 1500 but unsigned. According to Van Steffeswert expert Peter te Poel it bears all the characteristics of the Maastricht master sculptor. In 2016, the sculpture was selected as one of the ten most influential artworks from the Netherlands in the project Europeana 280.

== Signed sculpture ==
Van Steffesweert was one of the first woodcarvers in the Meuse region to sign his work, although not all his work is signed and the signatures vary ("IAN", "IAN VAN STEFFESWERT", "IAN VAN WEERD", "IAN BIELDESNIDER", etc). There are to date (2020) fourteen works signed by him, of which there are five in the Bonnefantemuseum. The signed sculpture of the Virgin and Child with St. Anne was acquired in 2005 from the parish church of Our Lady in Pey-Echt. It bears the name IAN and the date 151[1?] (last digit illegible). It is almost double the size (86.2 cm) of the unsigned version. In this sculpture, Mary's lower right arm is missing, so it is unclear what she was holding. In a very similar version of the sculpture in the church of Saint Gertrude in Tüddern, Germany (signed and dated 1513), she is holding a flower.
