= Nari Ward =

American artist

- Born: 1963 (age 62–63); St. Andrew, Jamaica
- Alma mater: Brooklyn College (MFA)
- Awards: Rome Prize (2012); Vilcek Prize (2017)
- Website: www.nariwardstudio.com

Nari Ward (born 1963 in St. Andrew, Jamaica) is a Jamaican-American artist based in New York City. He is a Distinguished Professor Emeritus at Hunter College. His work is often composed of found objects from his neighborhood, and "address issues related to consumer culture, poverty, and race". His awards include the Vilcek Prize in Fine Arts in 2017, and the Rome Prize in 2012.

== Early life and education ==
Ward was born in 1963 in St. Andrew, Jamaica and moved to the United States at age 12. By then, his talent for drawing was apparent, but according to Ward, his parents "didn’t know any artists or grow up around artists, so the artist was always the crazy guy on the outside and always broke," so he first studied advertising before changing his focus to his own art. He completed a BA from Hunter College, CUNY in 1991 and a MFA from Brooklyn College, CUNY in 1992. In 2011, he became a citizen of the United States.

== Career ==
Ward has shown in a wide variety of solo and group exhibitions. Ward was included in the 1995 and 2006 Whitney Biennials in New York and Documenta XI in Kassel (2003), and his works have been exhibited at the Institute of Contemporary Art, Boston, the New Museum of Contemporary Art in New York, the Walker Art Center in Minneapolis, and the Museum of Contemporary Art in Detroit. His solo exhibitions include Episodes at the Isabella Stewart Gardner Museum in Boston, The Refinery X: A Small Twist of Fate at the Palazzo delle Papesse-Centro Arte Contemporanea in Siena, Italy, Sun Splashed at the Pérez Art Museum Miami, and Rites of Way at the Walker Art Center in Minneapolis.

In 2011, he had a solo exhibition at the Massachusetts Museum of Contemporary Art entitled Nari Ward: Sub Mirage Lignum. His installation filled all of the museum's second floor and investigated transformative spaces that straddle the division between leisure and work. In the previous year he exhibited in a solo exhibition at Lehmann Maupin Gallery and was part of Contemplating the Void: Interventions in the Guggenheim Rotunda curated by Nancy Spector and held at the Guggenheim Museum. Other exhibitions include Prospect.1, New Orleans (2009); Whitney Biennial at the Whitney Museum of American Art, New York (2006); Documenta XI, Kassel, Germany (2002); a solo exhibition entitled Nari Ward's Rites-of-Way in the Minneapolis Sculpture Garden, Walker Art Center, Minneapolis, MN; a solo exhibition entitled Episodes at the Isabella Stewart Gardner Museum in Boston (2002); and a solo exhibition entitled The Refinery X: A small twist of fate at the Palazzo delle Papesse-Centro Arte Contemporanea in Siena, Italy (2006).

His work Homeland Sweet Homeland (2012) is included in the permanent collection of Pérez Art Museum Miami, where Ward had a major mid-career retrospective in 2015. The exhibition Nari Ward: Sun Splashed commented on citizenship, migration, racial and national identity through objects and installations. The show traveled to the Institute of Contemporary Art/Boston later on.

In 2022, his sculpture Peacekeeper was acquired by the Baltimore Museum of Art.

Nari Ward is represented by Lehman Maupin, New York.

== Installations ==
=== Amazing Grace, 1993 ===
Amazing Grace was first exhibited in a former firehouse in Harlem and then in 2013 at the New Museum in an exhibition titled "NYC 1993: Experimental Jet Set, Trash, and No Star." According to a review in Time Out, the exhibit "resembles a kind of post-apocalyptic landscape of discarded baby strollers and fire hoses, all culled from the surrounding neighborhood by the artist"; according to The New York Times, "Mr. Ward found all the abandoned strollers for this work on the streets of Harlem in the early 1990s, at the height of the AIDS crisis and a drug epidemic that disproportionately affected residents there." The exhibition is designed as a "room-size installation of baby strollers arranged so that you walk around them on a carpet of fire hoses, in a space lit like a church or mausoleum", according to The New York Times, while Time Out describes the exhibit as "evok[ing] the social cost" of "indifference" to landlord neglect that caused fires in minority neighborhoods and "characteristic of Ward's ongoing examination of race and its relationship to the urban environment."

The exhibition includes a rendition of "Amazing Grace" sung by gospel singer Mahalia Jackson playing on repeat. Kirsten Swenson writes in ARTnews that the strollers in the work "were arranged in the shape of a ship’s hull, in reference to the origin of the hymn, which was written by John Newton, an eighteenth-century British slave trader, after his conversion to Christianity during a storm at sea." As told to the Vilcek Foundation, "As a hymn about a slave trader begging for forgiveness and promising to change while caught in a storm at sea, the recording resonated with Nari, and allowed for a more hopeful interpretation of the installation."

Jeffrey Deitch assisted with the sale of the exhibition to Greek collector Dakis Joannou, and it was later shown in 2004 in Athens and then Vienna in 2007.

=== Hunger Cradle, 1996 ===
In 1996, Ward participated in the artist-run exhibition 3 Legged Race, organised in an abandoned firehouse in Harlem with two friends, the artists Janine Antoni and Marcel Odenbach. His installation Hunger Cradle "filled a floor with complex webs of rope, tubing, wire, and yarn, holding in suspension objects found on-site, including a crib, books, piano keys, and various tools", according to Kirsten Swenson of ARTnews. When the work was exhibited in the retrospective exhibition We the People in 2019, Gothamist described it as "impossibly busy spider-web thick with trapped relics taken from an derelict Harlem firehouse."

=== Mango Tourist, 2011 ===
To create Mango Tourist, Ward "collected thousands of leftover electrical components and combined them with materials and themes evocative of other economic development projects", according to George Fishman of the Miami Herald. Mango Tourist is described by the Carnegie Corporation of New York as a work "in which gigantic snowmen made of yellow foam, discarded electrical parts, and mango seeds conjure the images of America as the magical place that Ward envisioned as a kid growing up in Jamaica," and by the Philadelphia Inquirer as "his gaggle of eight seared-foam, capacitor-bedecked, mango-seed-studded, 10-foot-tall figures [...], a wry reflection on the shared lives of the Berkshire hills and sunburned Jamaica." In a 2011 interview with ARTnews, Ward discusses his use of snowmen in his work, stating, "Also: the label they always give me is 'the artist from Jamaica.' I’ve been living in New York most of my life, but when I go to Europe they're always calling me 'the Jamaican artist who lives in New York.' I'm like, 'Wait a second. I'm a New Yorker!' I like the idea of messing with expectations: 'Snowmen! He's from the Caribbean, isn’t he?'"

=== Breathing Directions, 2015 ===
In 2015, Ward exhibited the installation Breathing Directions at the Lehmann Maupin gallery. A review by The New York Times notes, "African-American history is embedded everywhere. The colored patterns in the floor installation are derived from 19th-century African-American quilts. Perforations cut into the wall sculptures refer to the breathing holes found in the floorboards of churches that sheltered escaped slaves." A review for Hyperallergic describes the inclusion of "symbols, which Ward encountered in a church in Savannah, Georgia, were created by punching holes in the floorboards, which enabled the escaped slaves once concealed beneath them to breathe – though not to breathe easy", when the series was exhibited at the Kemper Museum of Contemporary Art in 2018.

In a 2019 interview with Artspace, Ward describes a visit to the First African Baptist Church in Savannah, Georgia that was part of the Underground Railroad, and how the floors included holes in the pattern of the Kongo cosmogram prayer symbol, that were used to allow air into the hidden spaces beneath where escaped slaves would hide; in the interview, Nair said, "I was really intrigued by the fact that these holes represented a history that was preserved yet hidden in plain sight. I wanted to use the pattern and figure out how it could relate to the present moment." According to Kirsten Swenson of ARTnews, "Police violence victim Eric Garner's haunting 2014 cry, "I can't breathe," is also evoked by the panels."

=== Sun Splashed, 2015-2017 ===
This traveling retrospective exhibition included The Happy Smilers: Duty Free Shopping (1996), after it had been in storage since its original installation, and was described as "a kind of time capsule, its everyday materials preserving obscure narratives of racial politics from the age before social media" by Kirsten Swenson of ARTnews, as well as Mango Tourist, We The People, and Afro Chase. The exhibition also included Radha LiquorsouL, a work where Ward used "an old neon liquor store sign upside down, lights up only the letters that spell "soul," and festoons it with fake flowers, shoe tips, and shoelaces", which "reads like a roadside memorial, and weighs alcohol as a killer against alcohol as a spirit and sacramental offering," according to Cate McQuaid of the Boston Globe.

=== Nari Ward: G.O.A.T., again, 2017 ===
In 2017, Ward created an exhibition in Socrates Sculpture Park in Long Island City, Queens, featuring concrete goats. The sculptures include rebar "jutting from the backs" of the goats, which according to Michael B. Farrell of the CS Monitor, "In one sense, it's morbid", but according to Ward, is reminiscent of exposed rebar in buildings in Jamaica and other countries that allows further building development, and "When I see the rebar sticking out the roof, I always think about it as optimistic possibilities for the next generation."

=== Nari Ward: We The People, 2019 ===
In 2019, a traveling installation opened at The New Museum, featuring "Amazing Grace" (1993), "Hunger Cradle" (1996), and "We the People" (2011), as well as smaller works such as "Trophy" (1993), Savior" (1996), "Den" (1999), "Glory" (2004), and "Spellbound" (2015). A 2020 review by The Denver Post of the retrospective installation while it was at the Museum of Contemporary Art Denver states "Ward's work has consistently examined the Black experience in America, specifically through the lens of physicality, of actual lives lived, and in that way it connects inescapably to the BLM moment, which itself is rooted in physicality, namely the death of Minneapolis resident George Floyd, who died while in the custody of police officers on 25 May."

== Honors and awards ==
Ward is the recipient of numerous awards including the American Academy of Arts and Letters' Willard L. Metcalf Award (1998), Pollock Krasner Foundation grant (1996), The National Endowment for the Arts (1994), and the John Simon Guggenheim Fellowship (1992). He has also participated in the Studio Museum in Harlem's Artist-in-Residence program Ward has received commissions from the United Nations and the World Health Organization, and Awards from the American Academy of Arts and Letters, the National Endowment for the Arts, New York Foundation for the Arts, John Simon Guggenheim Foundation, and the Pollock Krasner Foundation. The Carnegie Corporation of New York honored Ward with 2019 Great Immigrant Award.

== Publications ==
- Nawi, Diana. (2015). Nari Ward: Sun Splash. exhibition catalog. New York: Prestel Publishing.
- Gioni, Massimiliano. (2019). Nari Ward: We the People. exhibition catalog. New York: Phaidon Press.
