= Bonnefantenmuseum =

Art museum Maastricht, Netherlands

Bonnefanten Museum
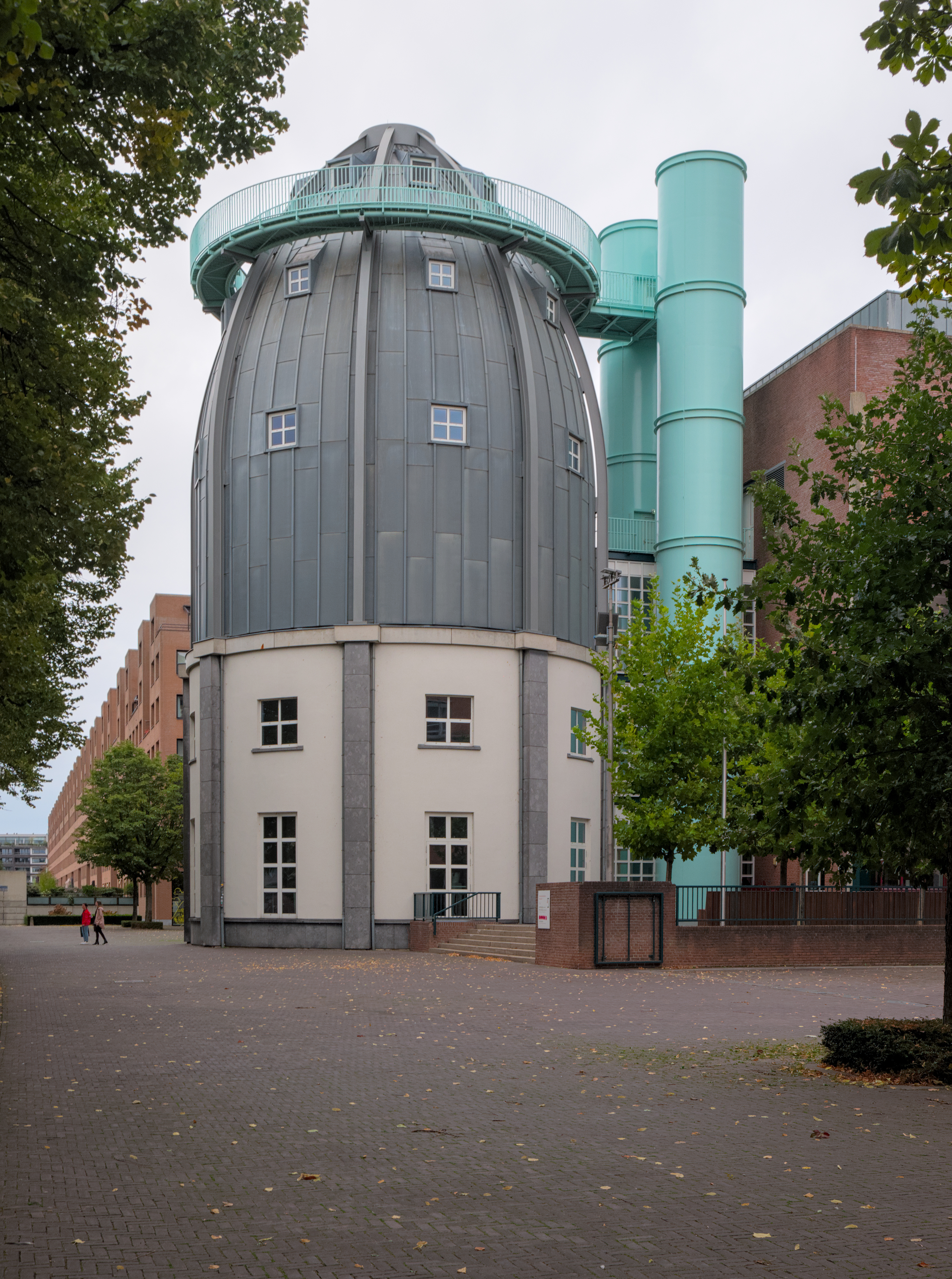
- Interactive fullscreen map
- Established: 1884
- Location: Avenue Céramique 250, Maastricht, Netherlands
- Coordinates: 50°50′33″N 5°42′07″E
- Director: Stijn Huijts
- Website: www.bonnefanten.nl

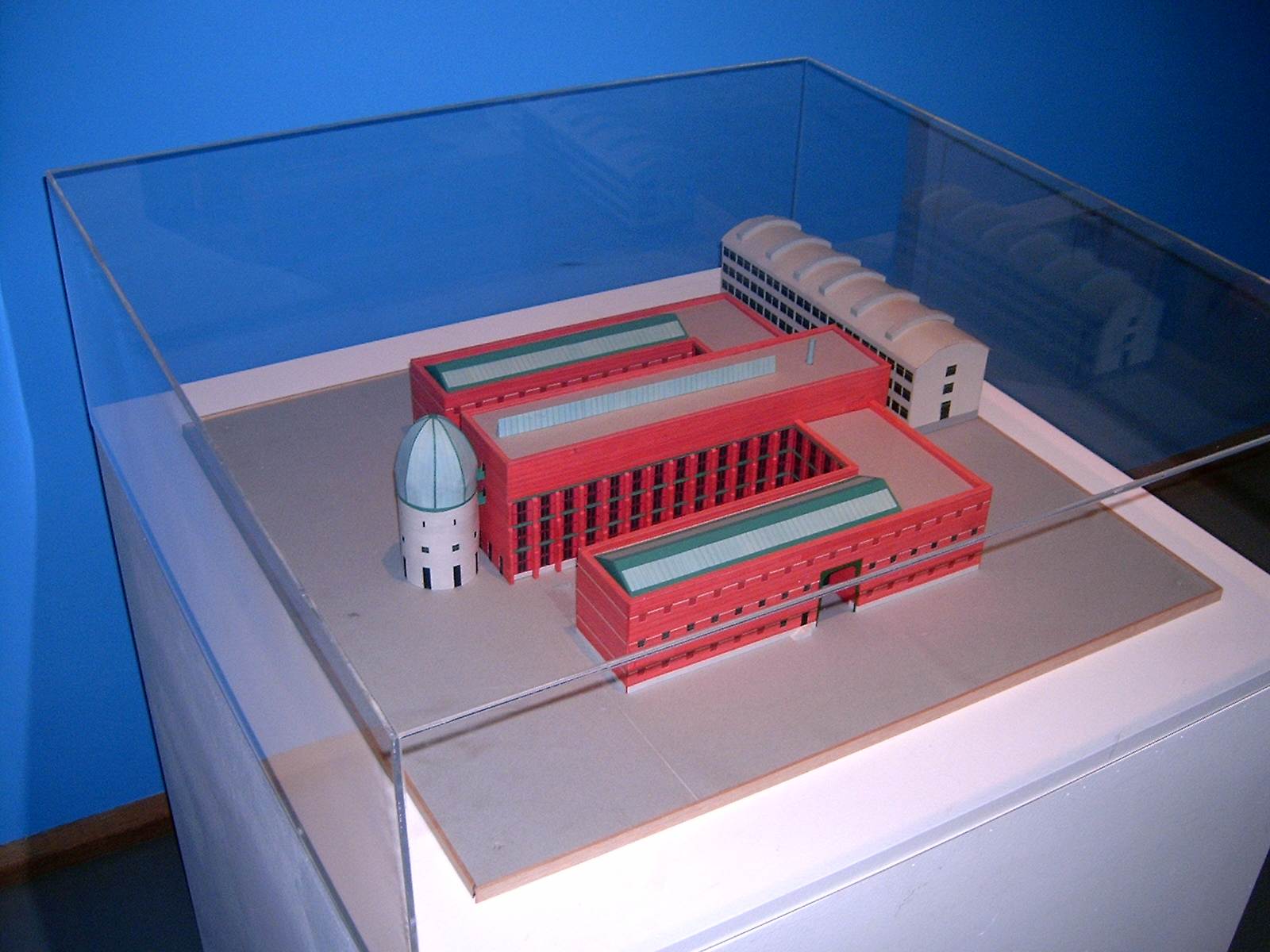
Maquette of Bonnefantenmuseum

The Bonnefanten Museum is a museum of historic, modern and contemporary art in Maastricht, Netherlands.

== History ==
The museum was founded in 1884 as the historical and archaeological museum for the Dutch province of Limburg. The name Bonnefanten Museum is derived from the French 'bons enfants' ('good children'), the popular name of a former convent that housed the museum from 1951 until 1978.

In 1995, the museum moved to its present location, a former industrial site named 'Céramique'. The new building was designed by Italian architect Aldo Rossi. With its rocket-shaped cupola overlooking the river Maas, it is one of Maastricht's most prominent modern buildings.

Since 1999, the museum has become exclusively an art museum. The historical and archaeological collections were housed elsewhere, partially at the Limburg Museum in Venlo. The museum is largely funded by the province of Limburg.

In 2009, the museum celebrated its 125th anniversary with the exhibition Exile on Main Street, celebrating modern and contemporary American art. Stijn Huijts has been director since 2012.

== Collection ==
The combination of historic art and contemporary art under one roof gives the Bonnefanten Museum a distinctive character. The department of old masters is located on the first floor and displays highlights of early Italian, Flemish and Dutch painting. Exhibited on the same floor is the museum's extensive collection of medieval sculpture. The contemporary art collection is usually exhibited on the second floor and focuses on American Minimalism, Italian Arte Povera and Concept Art. The second and third floors are also used for temporary exhibitions.

=== Historic Art ===
The collection of historic paintings and sculptures of the Bonnefanten Museum consists of four main sections:

- Wooden sculptures dating from the 13th to the 16th century, notably by Jan van Steffeswert (e.g. The Virgin and Child with St. Anne) and the Master of Elsloo);
- The Neutelings Collection of medieval art, consisting of artefacts made of wood, bronze, marble, alabaster and ivory from the Southern Netherlands, France, England and the German Lower Rhine region;
- Italian paintings from the 14th and 15th centuries: Giovanni del Biondo, Domenico di Michelino, Jacopo del Casentino, Sano di Pietro, Pietro Nelli;
- Flemish and Dutch paintings from the 16th and 17th centuries: Colijn de Coter, Jan Mandyn, Jan Provost, Roelandt Savery, Pieter Coecke van Aelst, Pieter Aertsen, Pieter Brueghel the Younger, David Teniers II, Peter Paul Rubens, Jacob Jordaens, Hendrik van Steenwijk II, Gérard de Lairesse, Wallerant Vaillant, Melchior d'Hondecoeter, Jan van Goyen and Cornelis de Bryer.

=== Contemporary art ===
Since Alexander van Grevenstein became director in 1986, the Bonnefanten Museum has focused mainly on contemporary art. The main focus of the permanent collection is on:

- Conceptual art: Jan Dibbets, Marcel Broodthaers, Joseph Beuys, Bruce Nauman, Gilbert and George, Ai Weiwei;
- Minimal Art: Sol LeWitt, Robert Ryman, Robert Mangold, Richard Serra;
- Arte Povera: Luciano Fabro, Mario Merz, Jannis Kounellis;
- Neo-expressionism: Neo Rauch, Peter Doig, Gary Hume, Grayson Perry, Luc Tuymans, Marlene Dumas.

The collection also features video art and room-size installations by younger artists: Atelier Van Lieshout, Francis Alÿs, David Claerbout, Patrick Van Caeckenbergh, Roman Signer, Franz West, Pawel Althamer.

In 2011, a deal was negotiated between the collectors Jo and Marlies Eyck and the province of Limburg. The result was that the Eyck collection of postwar art and the castle of Wijlre and its grounds, are now part of the museum.

== Visitor numbers ==
All figures are from museum year reports.

Year	Number	Notes
2023	c.154,000	
2022	c.110,000	
2021	c.67,000	The museum was partial closed due to coronavirus measures
2020	unstated	The museum was partial closed due to coronavirus measures
2019	c.147,000	
2018	c.129,000	
2017	c.114,000	
2016	c.133,000	

== Governance ==
The current director is Stijn Huijts. He replaced Alexander van Grevenstein, who became director in 1986. As of 2023, there are 53 permanent staff at the museum. The budget, in 2023, was around €9.9m, of which €6.5m was received in funding from the province of Limburg.

== Gallery ==
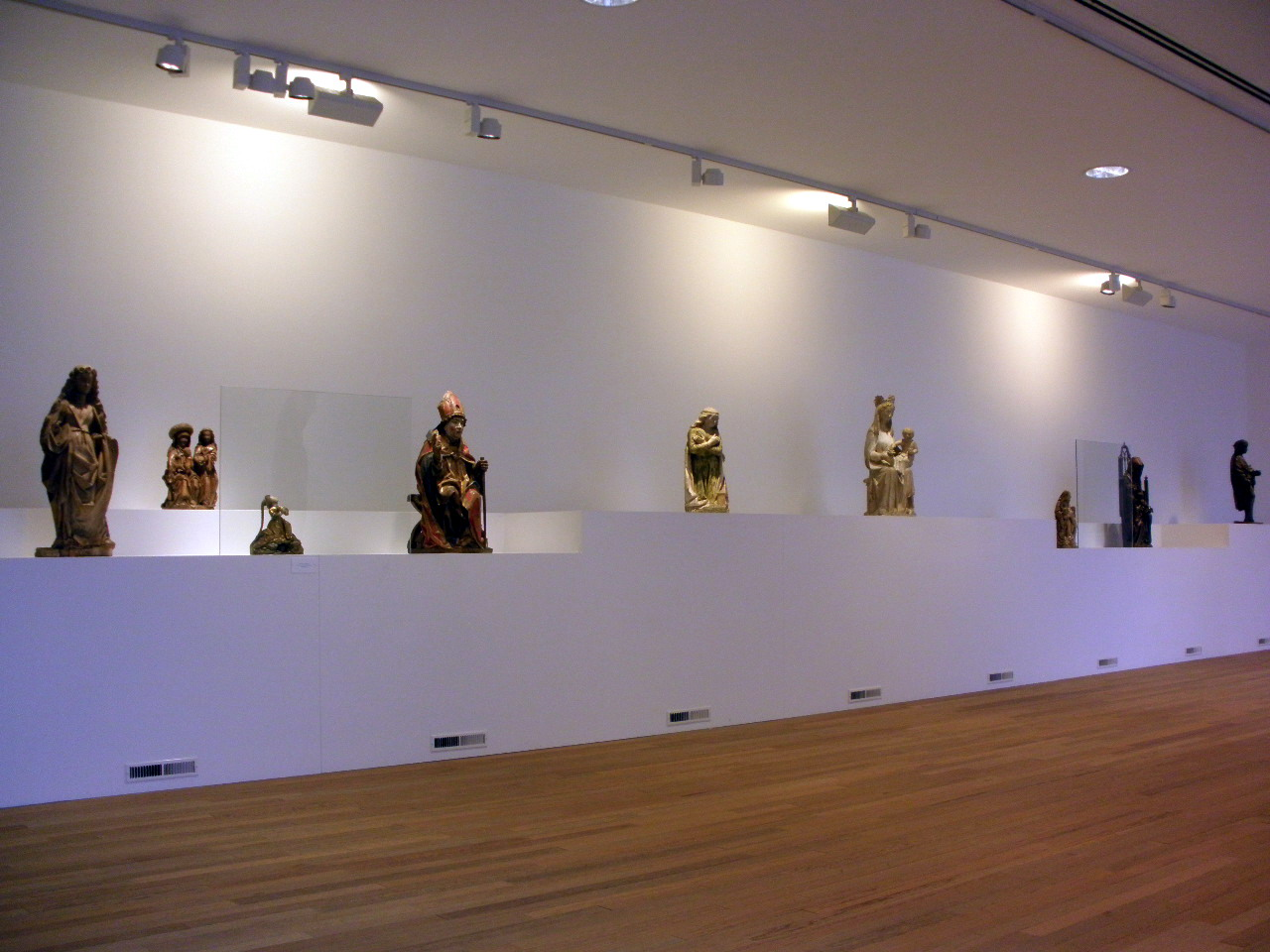
Overview of semi-permanent exhibition of medieval wood sculptures

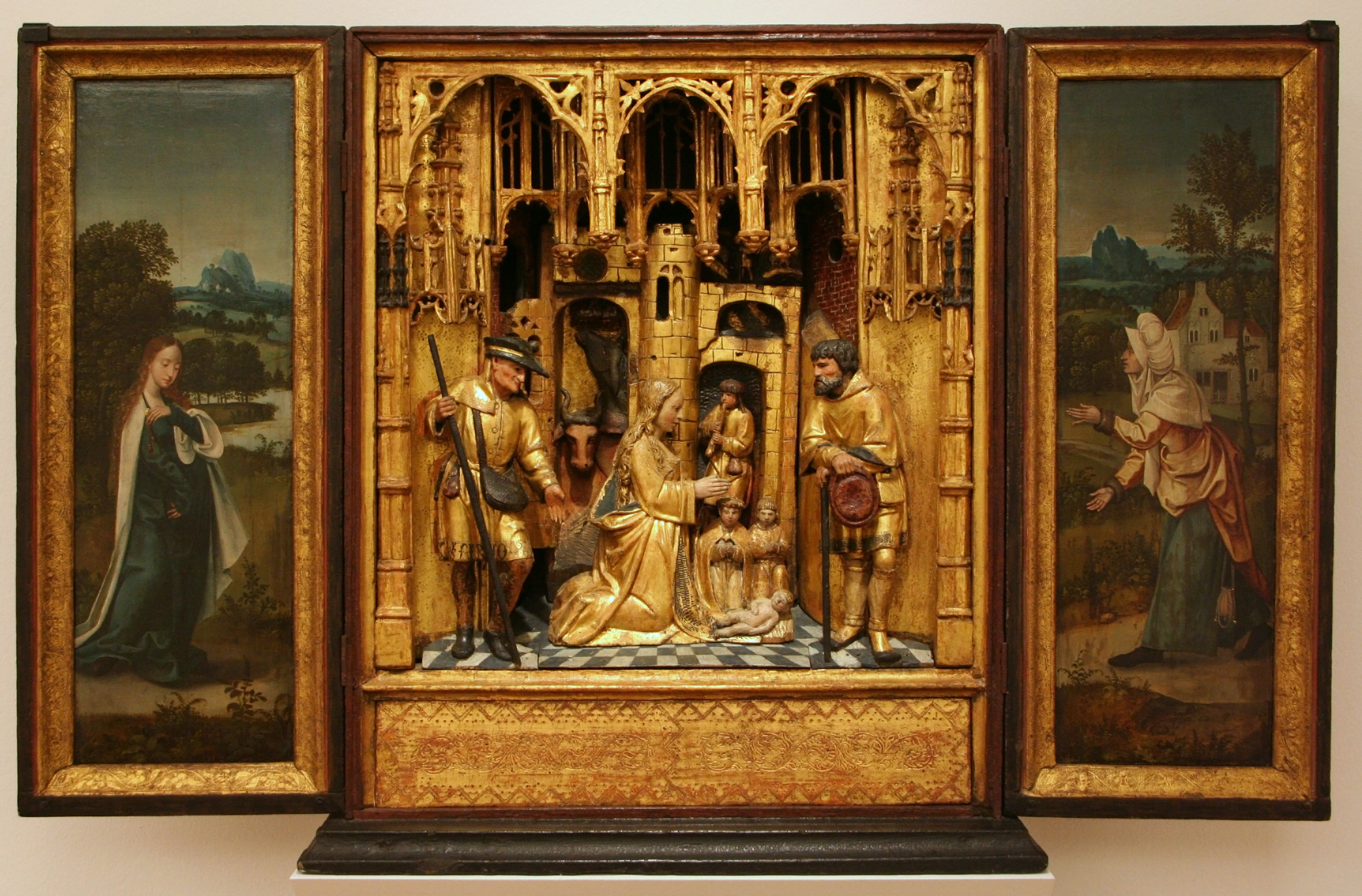
Triptych. Antwerp (?), 1518.

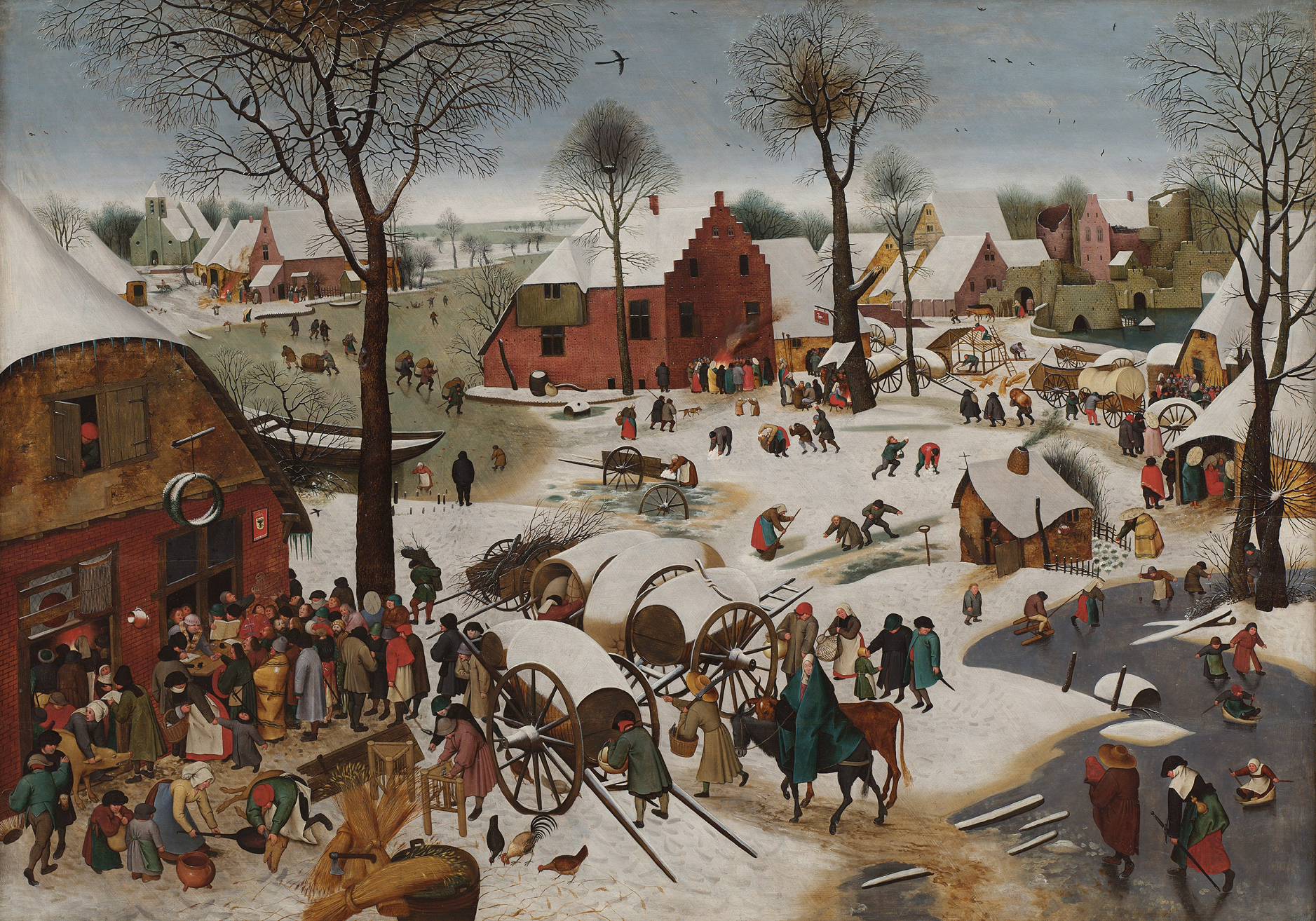
Census in Bethlehem (c. 1605–1610), Pieter Brueghel the Younger

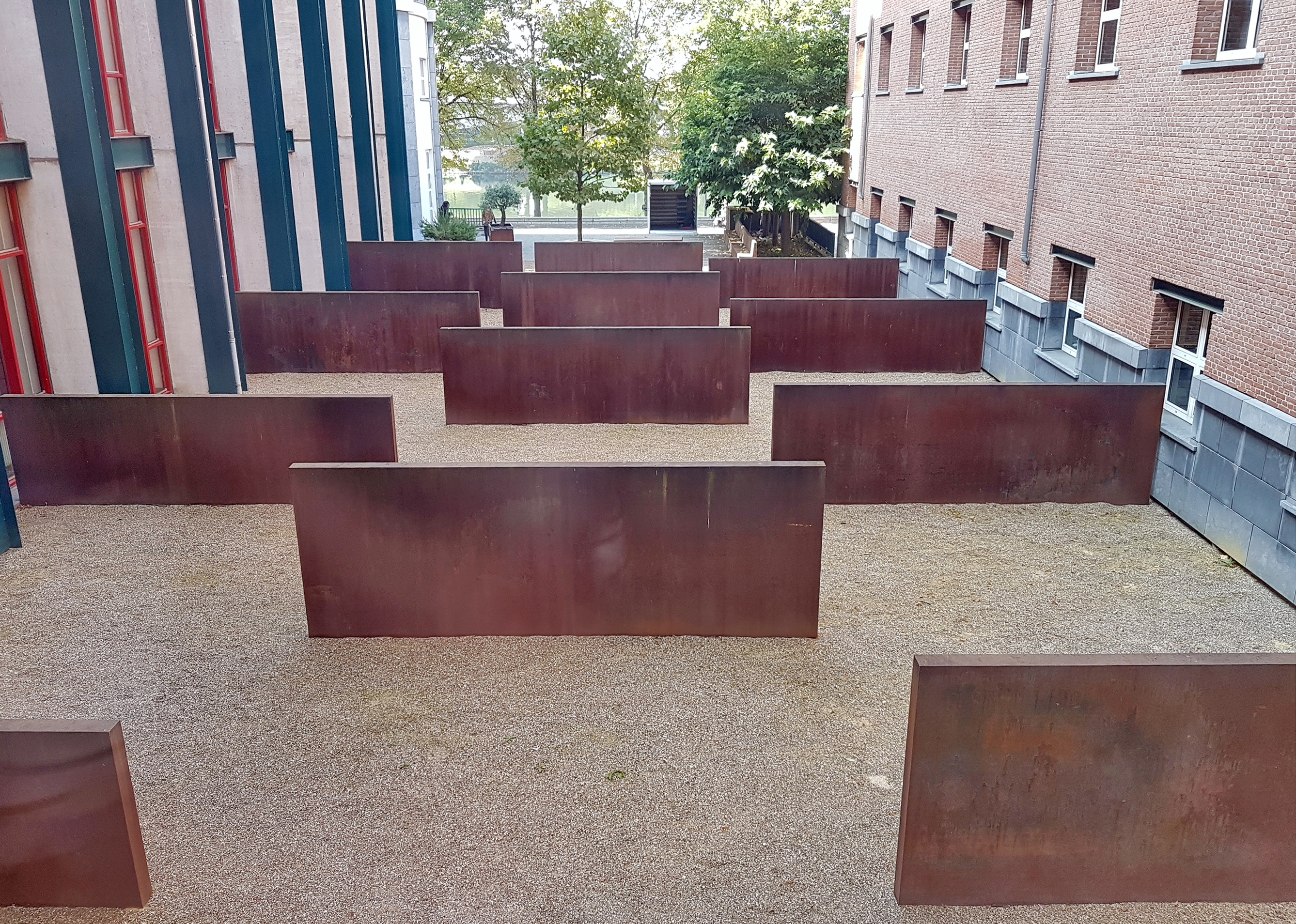
The Hours of the Day (2020), Richard Serra

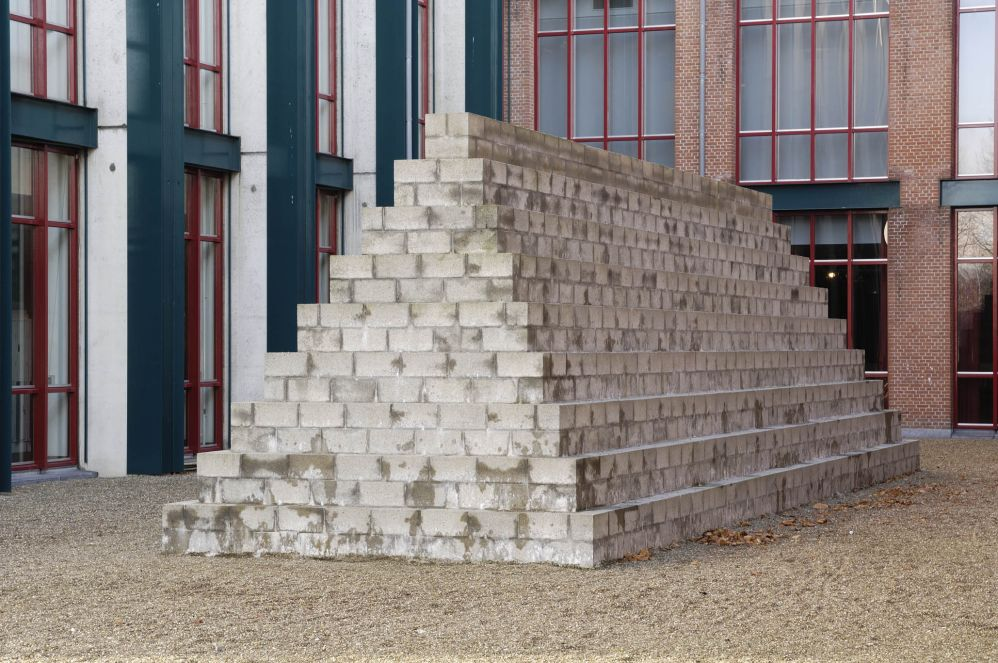
Long Pyramid (1994), Sol LeWitt
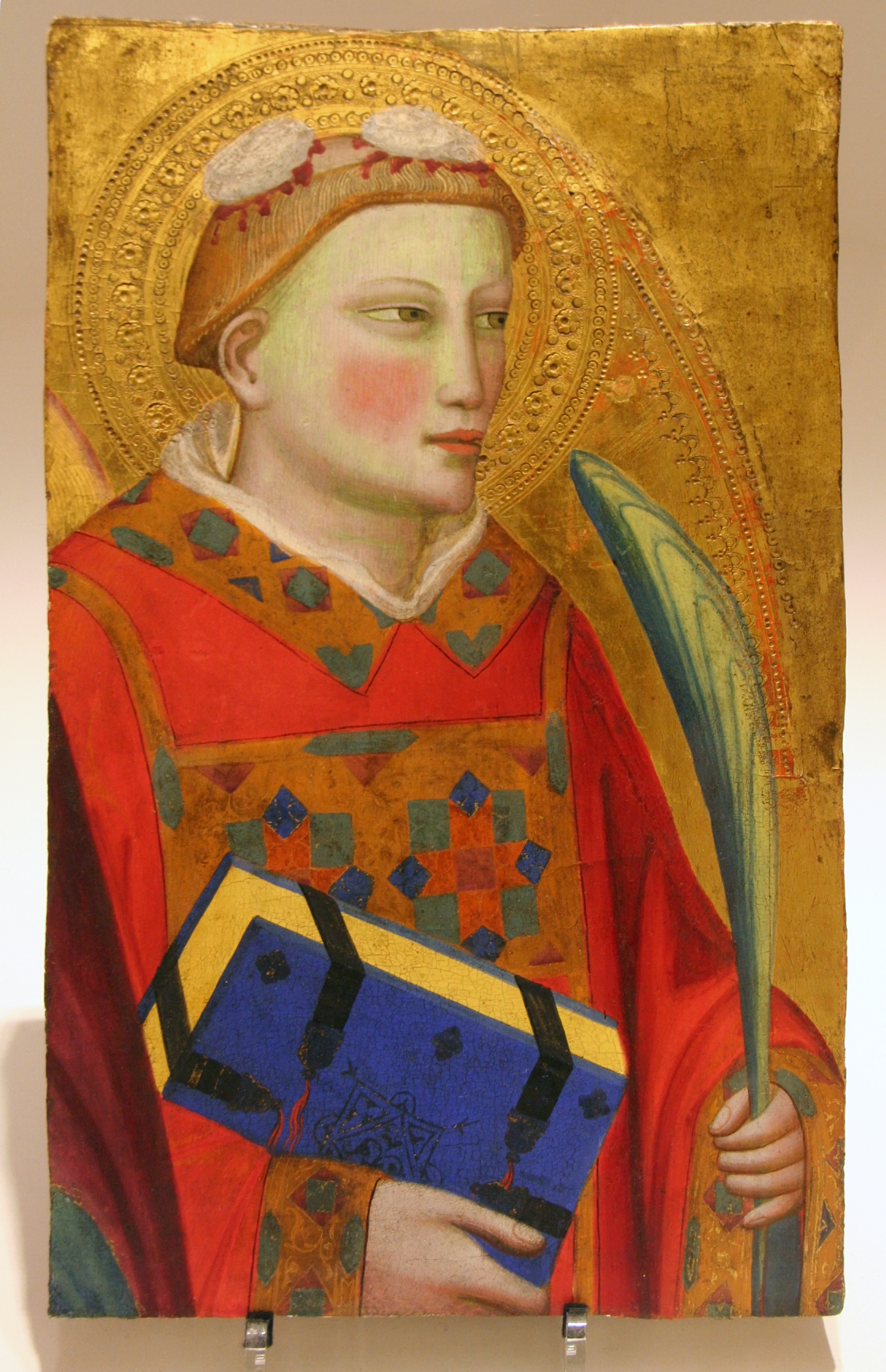
Saint Stephen (before 1399), Giovanni del Biondo

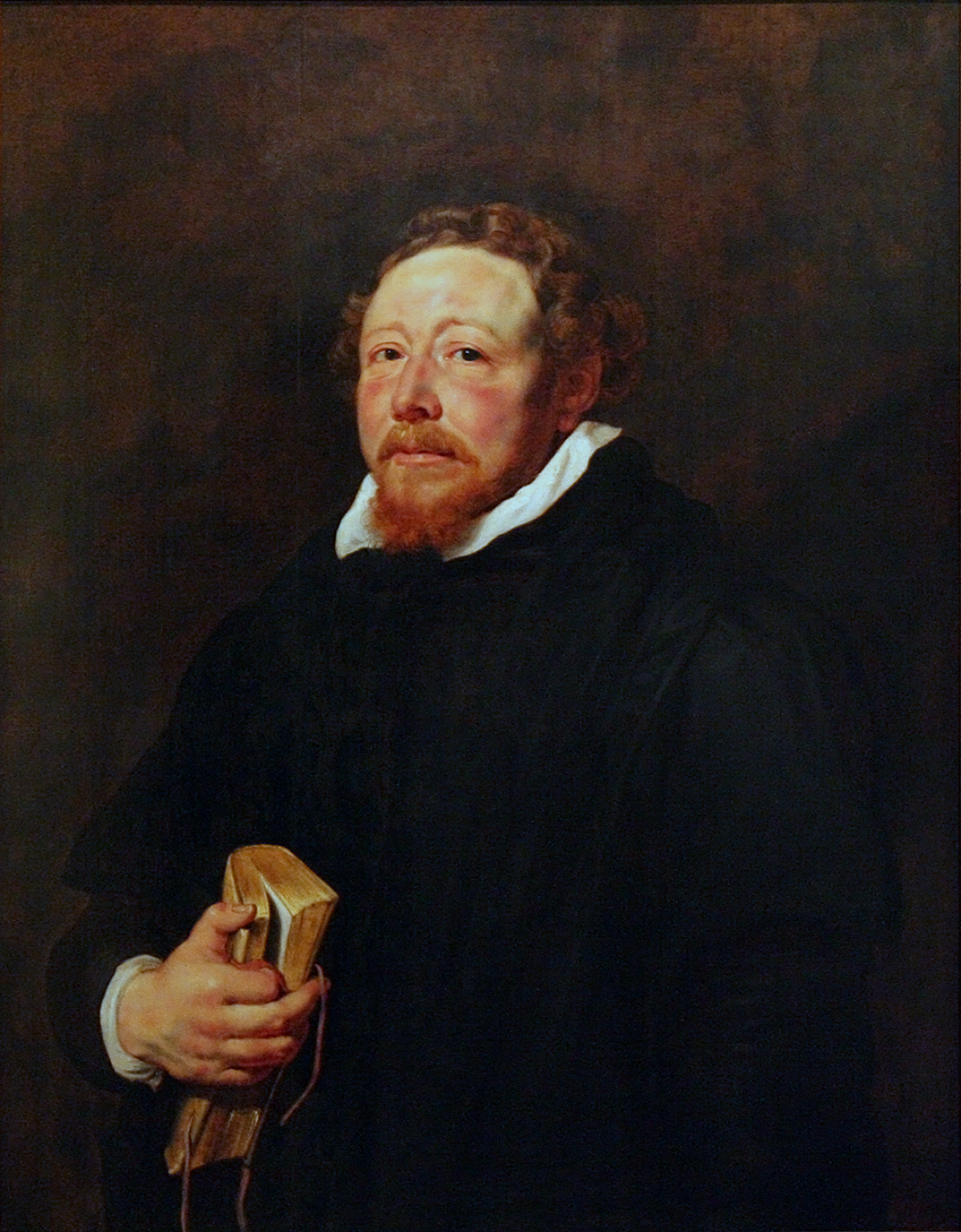
Portrait of Father Jan Neyen (1607), Peter Paul Rubens

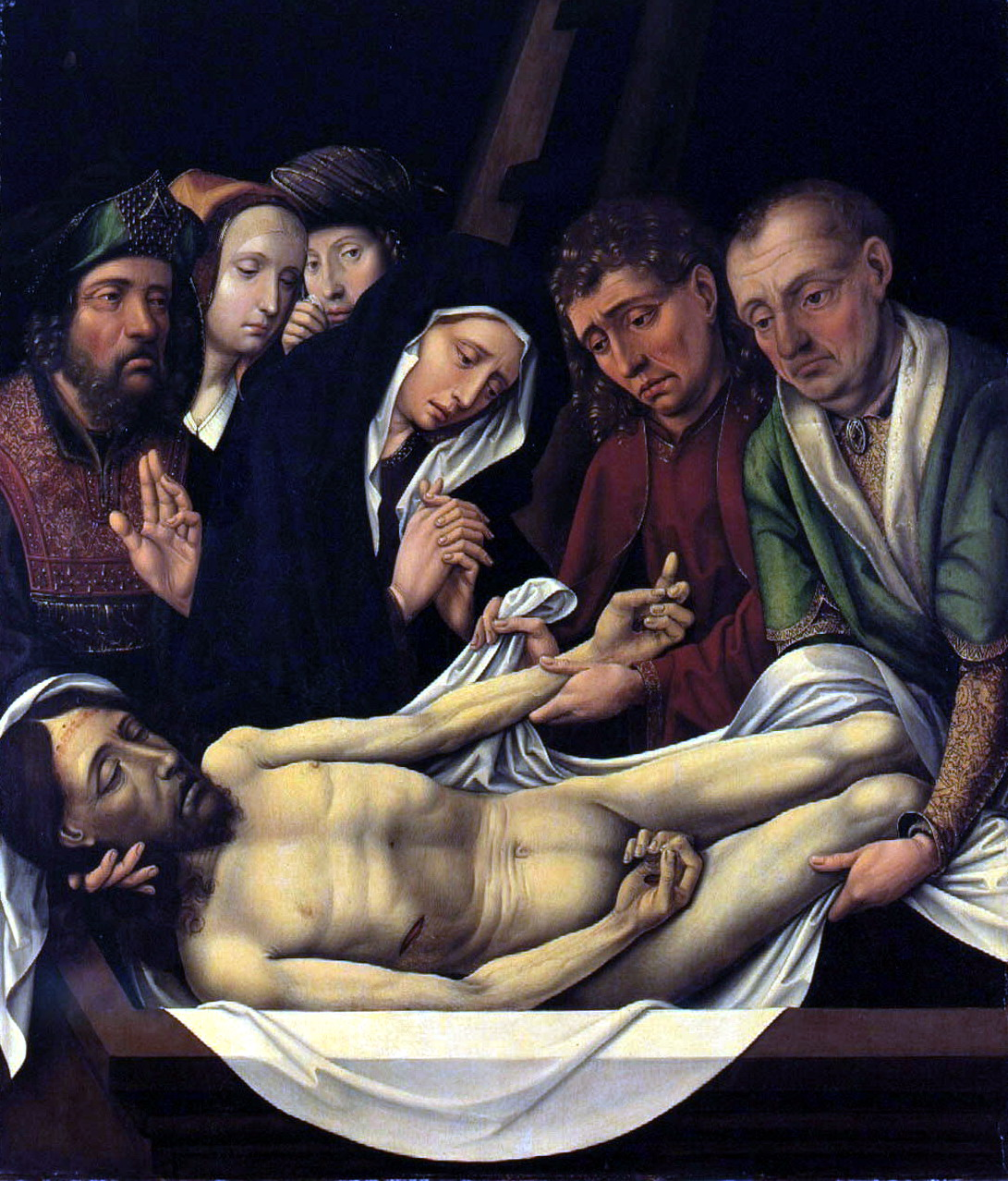
Entombment (±1505), Colijn de Coter

== See also ==
- Google Arts & Culture

== Bibliography, references and notes ==
- Szénássy, I.L. (ed.), Bonnefantenmuseum. Het gebouw. Het museum. De verzamelingen. Maastricht, 1984
- Szénássy, I.L. (ed.), Kunst in het Bonnefantenmuseum. Maastricht, 1984
- Szénássy, I.L. (ed.), Oudheden in het Bonnefantenmuseum. Maastricht, 1984
- Poel, P. te, Bonnefantenmuseum. Collectie Middeleeuws Houtsnijwerk. Maastricht, 2007
- Poel, P. te, Bonnefantenmuseum. Collectie Neutelings. Maastricht, 2007
- Quik, T., Bonnefantenmuseum. De geschiedenis. Maastricht, 2007
- Timmers, J.J.M., Catalogus van schilderijen en beeldhouwwerken. Maastricht, 1958
- Wegen, R. van, and T. Quik (ed.), Bonnefantenmuseum Maastricht. Maastricht, 1995
