= Jenny Scobel =

American painter (born 1955)

- Born: 1955 (age 70–71); Orrville, Ohio
- Known for: Painting
- Website: jennyscobel.com

Jenny Scobel (born 1955) is an American painter who lives and works in New York City. She makes paintings of women and children weaving a sense of innocence with foreboding or darkness. Her works, compared to Romaine Brooks, have been auctioned at Christie's and Sotheby's.

== Early and personal life ==
Jenny Scobel was born in Orrville, Ohio and grew up in Mentor, Ohio. At Cleveland Institute of Art, Scobel received her Bachelor of Fine Arts. She received her Master of Fine Arts from Pratt Institute.

She lives and works in Brooklyn, New York.

== Paintings ==
Scobel makes portraits or figurative paintings of children and women that blend a scene of innocent-like faces with images that suggest an underlying dark or disturbing story. The subtle mixed messages creates a "disarming perspective" and "present a mature approach to creating complex and disarming works. Family tree of a young girl in the foreground, hands in her pockets and a disturbing background of a tree and running blood is one example. She often works in wax and graphite. Journalist Kristin Capp likened her work to that of Romaine Brooks.

Raphael Rubinstein of Art In America said "Scobel is an artist whose attention to detail reaches manic (and sublime) proportions. She poses her subjects - in this show, pensive young women - against wallpaper per whose intricate motifs would exhaust a less patient artist. These backgrounds often seem to reveal the subjects' thoughts, as if the women had dreamed the allegorical scenes into existence."

She gives lectures, such as the April 7, 2010 engagement at the School of Art at Illinois State. Kerry James Marshall is her favorite artist.

== Works ==
A few of Scobel's works are:

- Untitled man, 1993, oil on panel
- One Rose, 1995, Rita Krauss Fine Art
- Blue veil, 2003-2004, graphite, wax and watercolor on masonite. Sold at Sotheby's in 2009
- Words fell, 2005, graphite, wax and watercolor on gessoed board. Sold at Christie's, London, 2013
- All that before, 2006, Zeno X Gallery, Antwerp
- Among friends, 2006, Zeno X Gallery, Antwerp
- Just the same, 2006, graphite, wax and watercolor on gessoed board
- Jenny Scobel, 2006 (exhibition catalog)
- Untitled girl, 2006, etching and drypoint
- Day at a time, 2009, Zeno X Gallery, Antwerp
- Family tree, 2012, Zeno X Gallery, Antwerp
- What the last man took, 2013

Her works are in the public collections at Hudson Valley for Contemporary Art, New York and the Rubell Family Collection in Miami, Florida.

== Exhibitions ==
=== Solo exhibitions ===
Scobel's work has been exhibited since about 1985. She has had solo shows at:

- Galerie der Stadt Backnang in Backnang, Germany in 2006
- Michel Soskine, Madrid in 2010
- Kendall School of Design in Grand Rapids, Michigan
- Thomas Erben Gallery in New York City.
- "Unsolved Mysteries" at Molloy College, Rockville Centre, New York in 1999.
- Zeno X in Antwerp, Belgium

=== Group exhibitions ===
Her work has been exhibited with other artists in London, New York, and Chicago. In 2004, Scobel participated in the exhibition "Sagt holde Frauen: 15 zeitgenössische Kunstlerinnen und das Medium Zeichnung" at the Fridericianum in Kassel, Germany
