= Patrick Van Caeckenbergh =

Belgian artist

Patrick Van Caeckenbergh (born 1960) is a Belgian artist. Born in Aalst, East Flanders, he now lives and works in Gentbrugge, Belgium.

== Work ==
Patrick Van Caeckenbergh has secluded himself from the outside world and as a hermit critically studies the world and his own life. He creates illusive collages and bizarre sculptures of figures and phenomena within an imaginary and fabulous realm. He starts with ordinary, everyday things and creates some sort of magical assemblages by restructuring and reorganizing them. More than being an artist or a philosopher, Van Caeckenbergh is a tinkerer: he manipulates, mends and experiments with his material. Instead of being created in a mechanical and technical fashion, his work comes into being within a dynamic, natural process, characterized by coincidence and obscurity.

== Exhibitions ==
Van Caeckenbergh had a solo-exhibition "Stil Geluk. Een keuze uit het werk 1980-2001" in the Bonnefantenmuseum in Maastricht in 2002. His work was included in many group exhibitions, such as the Taipei Biennial (2014); the 5th Biennale of Lyon (2000); "Acracadabra" in the Tate Gallery in London (1999); "Manifesta 1" in Rotterdam (1996); "Hors - Limites. L'art et la vie 1952-1994" in Centre Georges Pompidou, Paris (1994); and La Biennale di Venezia (1993). In 2005, the Musée des Beaux-arts de Nîmes (Carré d'Art) organised a solo-exhibition. In 2006, Van Caeckenbergh's maquettes were on view at Zeno X Gallery, Antwerp and in 2007, an exhibition was held in La Maison Rouge, Paris.

== De Pantoloog (danke Schön) ==
In the Museum Voor Schone Kunsten in Ghent Van Caeckenbergh created his installation titled 'De Pantoloog (danke Schön)' with a selection of his own work. The work of Patrick Van Caeckenbergh was installed amid the permanent collection as part of the rehanging of the galleries in 2017. It will be on display until 2022. The artist donated "The Cigar Box" - his workplace along with its contents - as one of his most important works to the museum.

== Art market ==
Van Caeckenbergh has been represented by Zeno X in Antwerp since 1987 and Lehmann Maupin in New York since 2014.
