= Sung Neung Kyung =

South Korean artist (born 1944)

Sung Neung Kyung (Korean: 성능경; born 1944) is a South Korean contemporary artist best known for his performance art created during the authoritarian period under president Park Chung Hee. This period was marked by extreme censorship and violent suppression. The extreme political conditions of this period facilitated the emergence of a distinct culture of performance art mainly centered around The Korean Avant-Garde Association (AG) and the Space and Time Group (ST), founded by Lee Kun-Yong, a close collaborator of Sung. Sung’s work is characterized by the dissection of ubiquitous parts of daily life and an exploration of the symbolism of routines. He continues to make art prolifically and was featured in a major 2023 exhibition of Korean Avant-Garde art at the Guggenheim Museum (originally shown at the National Museum of Modern and Contemporary Art in Seoul) titled Only the Young: Experimental Art in Korea, 1960s -1970s

== Early life and career ==
Sung Neung Kyung was born in Yesan County, Chūseinan Province, Korea, Empire of Japan (now in South Korea) in 1944. His early life was dominated by the shadow of the 1950–1953 Korean War. His older cousin, Sung Chan Kyung, left his studies at Seoul National University and returned to Yesan right before the onset of the war. While Sung Chan Kyung was living with Sung Neung Kyung’s family he shared the poetry, classical music, literature, and knowledge of art he had acquired at university. This relationship was pivotal to Sung Neung Kyung’s artistic development and inspired him to be an artist at the age of seven.

Sung studied art in school starting in 1963. Later on, he completed mandatory military service from 1970-73. This period of Korean history was shaped by the presidency of Park Chung Hee, who was in power from 1963-79. Park’s administration prioritized the modernization of South Korea and creating a cultural identity for the nation that was compatible with the administration’s aspirations as a global industrial power while simultaneously being distinct from the nation’s colonial past. During his administration the press was heavily censored, activists were kidnapped and tortured, and the cultural products of South Korea became tightly regulated.

The Park administration heavily promoted western inspired oil paintings showing scenes of Korean industry and patriotism. Artists making other types of work were heavily censored and monitored. Sung Neung Kyung and many of his peers had to carefully consider the implications of their practices, understanding that the government would retaliate against any criticism.

In reaction to the authoritarian conditions of the 1960s and 70s in South Korea, a distinct performance art movement took shape to which Sung was a key player. The movement was wide-ranging, but two of the best known artist groups were The Korean Avant-Garde Association (AG) and the Space and Time Group (ST). ST was organized by Lee Kun-yong, a close collaborator of Sung Neung Kyung. These groups used routinized actions to call attention to the restrictive conditions imposed by the government. Their performances were often called “events” or “happenings.” Sung Neung Kyung also coined the term “modules” to describe his individual smaller performances.

== Notable works ==
=== Smoking (1976) ===
These factors shaped the artistic practice of Sung Neung Kyung and his peers, whose work investigated themes of individuality, freedom, expression, and daily movement. In Smoking (1976), Sung uses the act of smoking a cigarette (one of the few vices allowed by the Park government) to represent latent potential for rebellion in daily acts. Photographs of the performance show the ash on the tip of the cigarette accumulating and tilting more precariously as the performance progresses.

=== Apple (1976) ===
Apple is another performance work that dissects a commonplace act and turns it into a study of control. In Apple, which is documented across seventeen photographs, Sung eats an apple. As the shape of the fruit changes in his hands, the artist outlines what remains of the apple after each bite in blue pen. The frame is tight and controlled and establishes a sense of intensity to the scene. The narrowness of the frame establishes the relationship between the artist and the apple as the sole focus of the images, referencing the rareness of acts of autonomy amidst authoritarian conditions. A photograph of Apple was selected as the cover image for the exhibition catalogue for “Only The Young,” the massive retrospective of Korean avant-garde art at the Guggenheim Museum in 2023.

=== Newspaper (1974-ongoing) ===
In 1974 Sung Neung Kyung produced Newspaper: From June, 1, 1974 On, his first foray into using newspaper as a primary material. His Newspaper works involve laying out a page from a newspaper, reading out headlines and blocks of text, then using a razor blade to carefully cut out the blocks of text that have been read. What remains after the initial performance is only the negative space in the newspaper and the images and advertisements. This practice formed out of Sung’s fear of censorship and punishment. In the early period of the Newspaper series, Sung recounts being approached by a reporter from Kyunghyang Shinmun looking to write about his work and emphatically declining, feeling certain that he would be arrested and tortured if his work became widely publicized.

Sung used The Dong-A Ilbo, a popular newspaper that was censored by the government at the time, in his early Newspaper performances. This choice of newspaper allowed him to use the performances to criticize government censorship under the guise of examining the materiality of journalism.

Since the 1970s, Sung has continued the Newspaper series but adapted it to contemporary issues and increased the scale of his performances which are no longer closely scrutinized by law enforcement. Recent iterations of Newspaper have incorporated up to 100 people reading newspapers in their own languages while acting out the same subtraction of text with razor blades.
