= N. Dash =

American artist

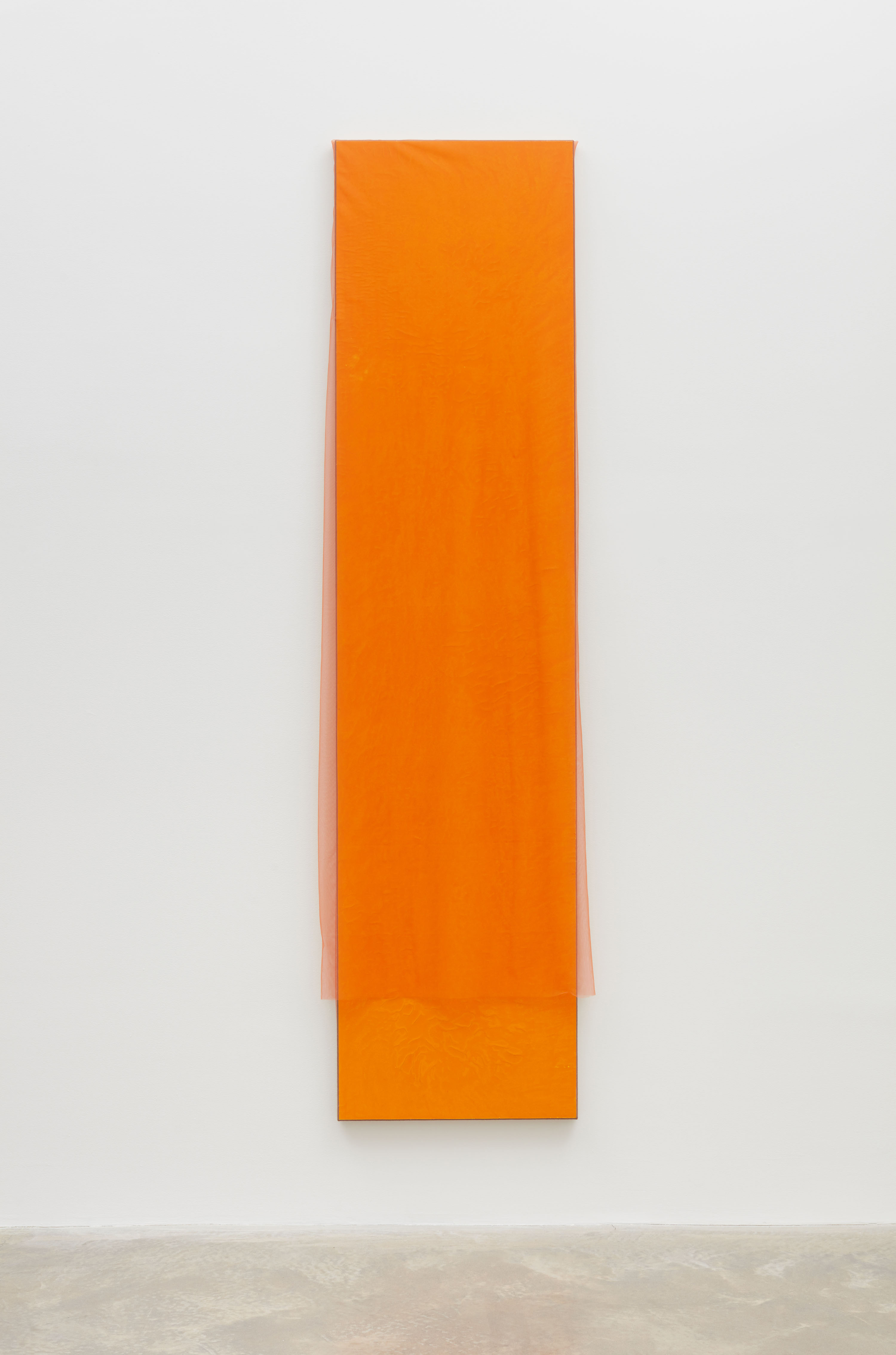
N. Dash, Untitled, 2019, earth, acrylic, agricultural netting, jute, 90 x 22"/ 228.6 x 55.88cm

N. Dash is an American artist who works primarily in painting. Dash lives and works in New York. Born in 1980 in Miami, Dash studied at New York University (B.A. 2003), before earning a Master's in Fine Art from Columbia University (M.FA. 2010).

== Exhibitions ==
In 2023-2024, the artist has presented N. Dash: and water, a solo exhibition at SITE Santa Fe, NM. In the same years, the artist was also included in WORLD FRAMED Contemporary Drawing Art of the Schering Stiftung Collection at the Kupferstichkabinett at Staatliche Museen zu Berlin, Berlin, Germany, and in the group exhibition This is Us at Z33 House of Contemporary Art, Design and Architecture, Hasselt, Belgium. In 2022, the artist presented earth, a solo exhibition at Stedelijk Museum voor Actuele Kunst (S.M.A.K.), Ghent, Belgium. In 2019, the work was the subject of exhibitions at The Aldrich Contemporary Art Museum in Ridgefield, CT and the Museum of Contemporary Art Santa Barbara, CA. In 2015, Dash presented a solo exhibition at the Hammer Museum in L.A. Additional solo institutional exhibitions include: Fondazione Giuliani, Rome and White Flag Projects, St. Louis as well as solo presentations at Zeno X Gallery, Antwerp; Casey Kaplan, New York; and Galerie Mehdi-Chouakri, Berlin. Dash's work has been included in numerous group exhibitions at institutions including the San Francisco Museum of Modern Art; the Dallas Museum of Art; Sammlung Goetz, Munich; American University Museum, Washington D.C.; Fowler Museum at UCLA, Los Angeles; the Jewish Museum, New York; Birmingham Museum of Art, Alabama; MAXXI Museum, Rome; Palazzo Strozzi, Florence, as well as the Flag Art Foundation, New York.

N. Dash is the subject of a comprehensive monograph published by Gregory R. Miller and Hatje Cantz Verlag which includes major works from 2011 to 2021, and essays by Suzanne Hudson, Ajay Kurian, Ross Simonini, Michael Taussig and a poem by John Giorno, which explore Dash's work in art historical, anthropological, and environmental contexts.

== Selected Public Collections ==
- Margulies Collection, Miami, FLA
- Blanton Museum of Art, Austin, TX
- Dallas Museum of Art,
- FRAC des Pays de la Loire, France
- Frac Normandie Rouen, France
- Goetz Collection, Munich, Germany
- Hammer Museum, Los Angeles, CA
- Kadist, Paris, France and San Francisco, CA
- Kupferstichkabinett, Berlin, Germany
- Museum of Modern Art, New York, NY
- Nelson-Atkins Museum of Art, Kansas City, MO
- S.M.A.K., Ghent, Belgium
- San Francisco Museum of Modern Art, San Francisco, CA
- Solomon R. Guggenheim Museum, New York, NY
- UC Berkeley Art Museum and Pacific Film Archive, Berkeley, CA
- Whitney Museum of American Art, New York, NY
- Buffalo AKG Art Museum, Buffalo, NY
- Baltimore Museum of Art, Baltimore, MD

== Publications ==
- N. Dash. Texts by John Giorno, Suzanne Hudson, Ajay Kurian, Ross Simonini, and Michael Taussig. Published by Gregory R. Miller & Co., New York, 2022. ISBN 9781941366363
