= Villapark =

Coordinates: 50.8378°N 5.6916°E

- neighbourhood
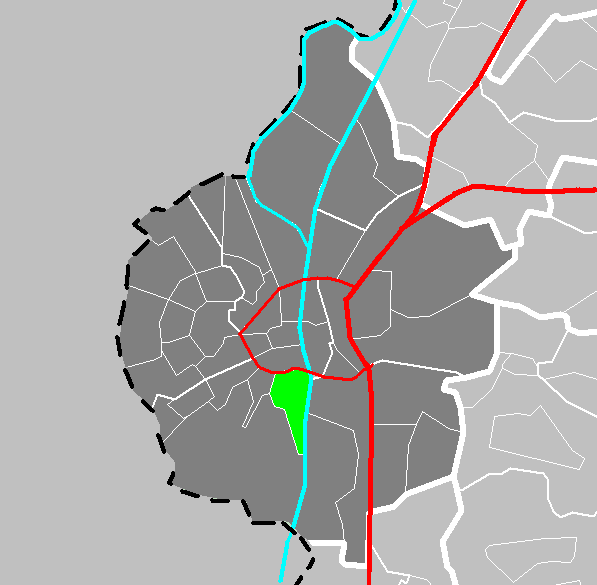
- Location of Villapark in Maastricht
- Municipality: Maastricht
- Province: Limburg
- Country: Netherlands

Area
  - Total: 100 ha (250 acres)

Population
  - Total: 3.070
  - Density: 3.1/km^{2} (8.0/sq mi)

Villapark is a neighbourhood of Maastricht, Netherlands, located in the city's southwestern part. It is a relatively affluent neighbourhood.

== Notable features ==
- Sint Petrus Church (also called Sint-Pieter beneden), in Neo-Romanesque style

== Trivia ==
- In common parlance, the neighbourhoods of Jekerdal, Villapark and Sint Pieter are all perceived as constituting Sint Pieter.

== Impressions ==
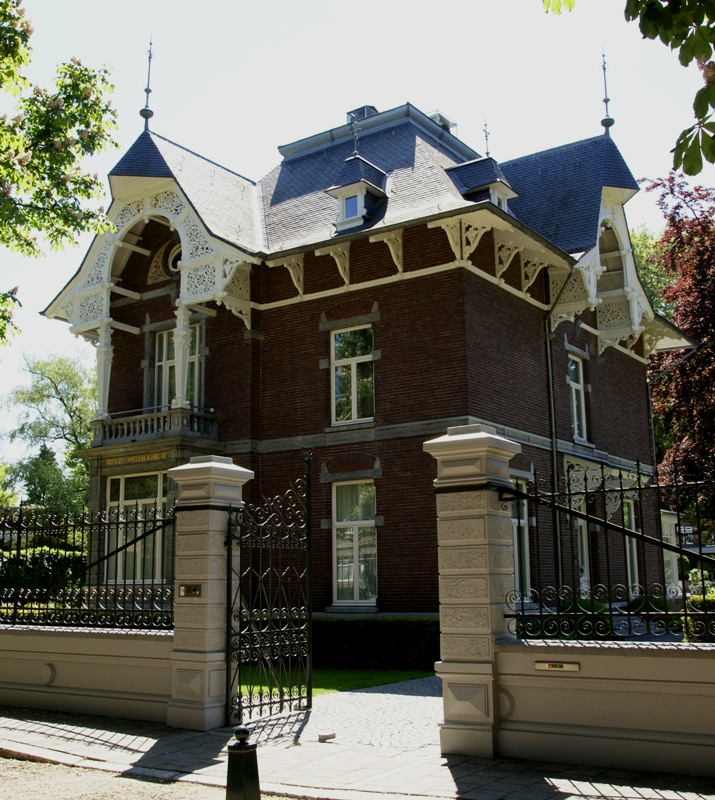
Villa Wilhelmina, national monument 506661

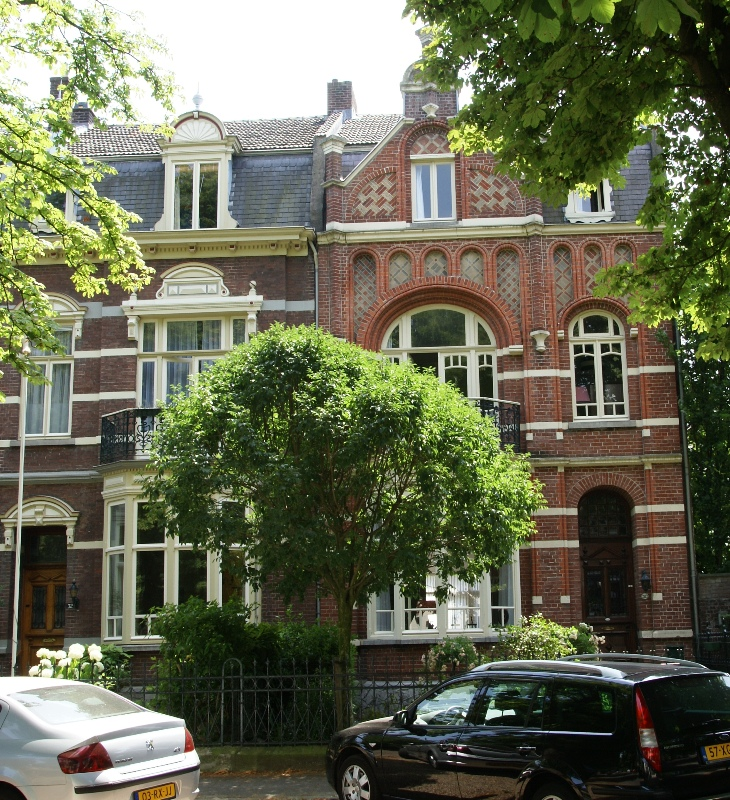
National monument 506714

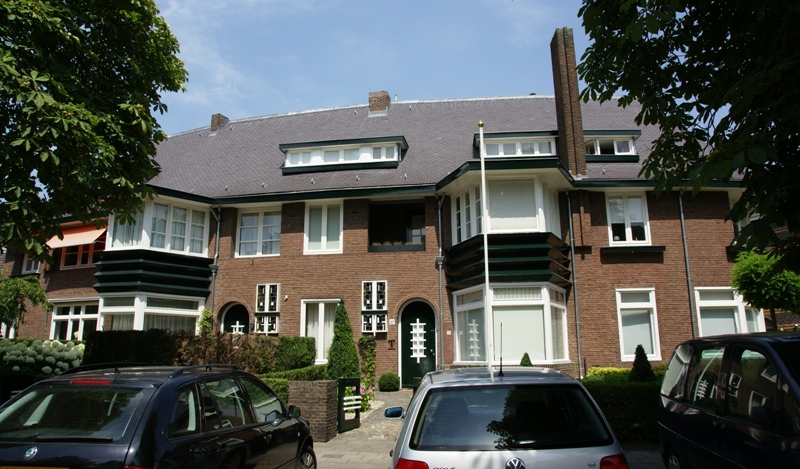
National monument 506662

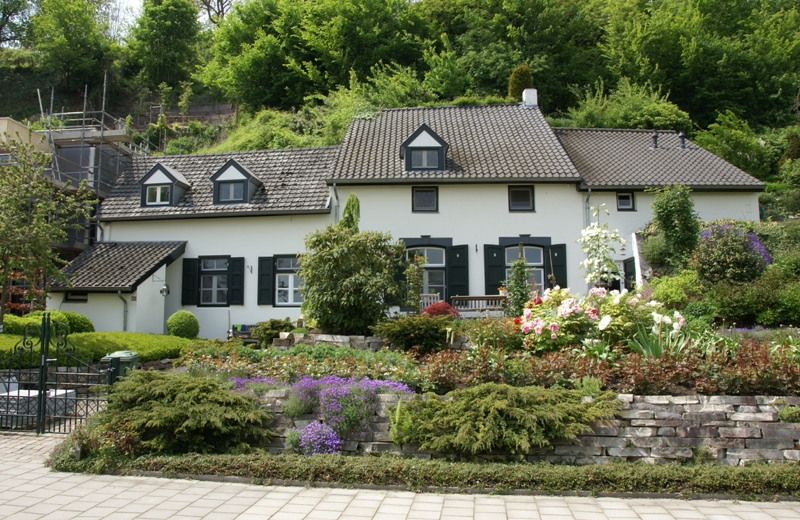
National monument 27972

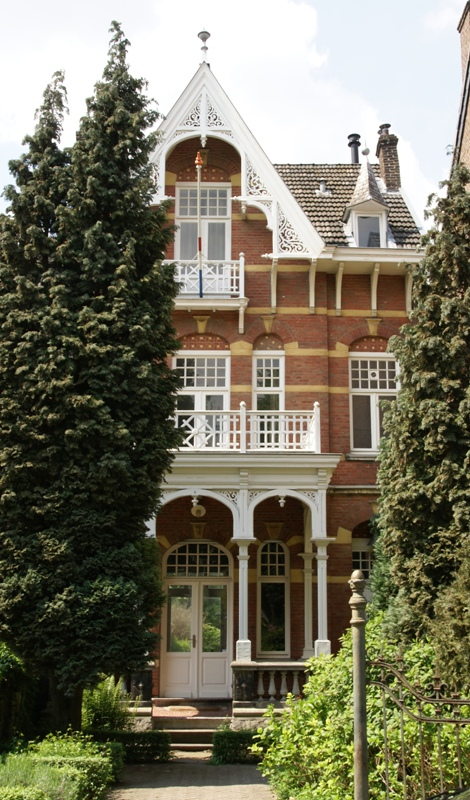
National monument 506653
