= Massimiliano Gioni =

Italian art curator

- Born: December 6, 1973 (age 52); Busto Arsizio, Italy
- Education: Universita di Bologna
- Occupations: Toby Devan Lewis Director of the New Museum (from August 2026); Artistic Director of the Nicola Trussardi Foundation; Artistic Director of the Beatrice Trussardi Foundation
- Spouse: Cecilia Alemani (m. 2010)

Massimiliano Gioni (born 1973) is an Italian curator and contemporary art critic based in New York City. He has served as artistic director at the New Museum since 2014, and in July 2026 was named the museum's next director, effective August 2026. He is the artistic director of the Nicola Trussardi Foundation in Milan as well as the artistic director of the Beatrice Trussardi Foundation. Gioni was the curator of the 55th Venice Biennale in 2013.

== Early life and education ==
Massimiliano Gioni was born in Busto Arsizio, Italy, in 1973, the youngest of three siblings. At 15 he won a full scholarship from the United World Colleges and moved to complete his high school studies at the Pearson College UWC in Vancouver Island, Canada.

He graduated in Disciplines of the Arts, Music, and Cinema from the Faculty of Literature and Philosophy at the University of Bologna, Italy.

In interviews, Gioni has stated that he first came into contact with contemporary art at the age of 13, after reading Lucy Lippard's book, Pop Art.

== Career ==
Working as a translator and editor while at university, in 1996 Gioni founded Trax, one of the first Italian digital art and culture magazines, which published writings by, among others, Tracey Emin, Gilbert and George, W.J. Mitchell, Hans Ulrich Obrist, Chris Ofili, Matthew Slotover, Rirkrit Tiravanija, Kara Walker, David Foster Wallace, and Edmund White.

=== Flash Art, 1997–2003 ===
In 1997, Gioni joined the contemporary art magazine Flash Art, initially working in the Milan office. In 2000, he was appointed as the American editor of the magazine, leaving the publication in 2003.

In 1997, Gioni met Italian artist Maurizio Cattelan whilst interviewing him for Flash Art, striking up a friendship with the older artist. Cattelan asked Gioni to act as his doppelgänger for press interviews on television and radio, and even some lectures, wherein Gioni would pretend to be Cattelan. In 2017, Gioni once again appeared as a stand-in for the artist during interviews in the documentary Maurizio Cattelan: Be Right Back. The film premiered at the Tribeca Festival, and played in theaters in 2017.

In 2002, Gioni, Cattelan and curator Ali Subotnick founded The Wrong Gallery, billed as "the smallest exhibition space in New York". The Wrong Gallery had an exhibition space of approximately one metre square, which could be seen through a locked single glass door. It later went on show at the Tate Modern in London, UK, in 2005.

Gioni's first major curatorial project was the "La Zona" section of the Venice Biennale in 2003, which was directed by Francesco Bonami, with whom Gioni had previously worked and collaborated.

Since 2002, Gioni has been directing the Nicola Trussardi Foundation, which he transformed into a nomadic museum that organizes exhibitions by contemporary artists in forgotten buildings, public monuments and abandoned palazzos in the city of Milan. Its first commissioned project, 'Short Cut', by artist duo Elmgreen & Dragset, opened in Milan in May 2003. On the occasion of the International Expo in Milan, in 2015, with the Nicola Trussardi Foundation, Gioni curated "The Great Mother" at Palazzo Reale. And in 2017 he organized "The Restless Earth" at Triennale di Milano. During his tenure as artistic director, he has curated projects by Allora and Calzadilla, Paweł Althamer, Darren Almond, John Bock, Maurizio Cattelan, Martin Creed, Tacita Dean, Jeremy Deller, Elmgreen and Dragset, Urs Fischer, Fischli and Weiss, Cyprien Gaillard, Ragnar Kjartansson, Sarah Lucas, Ibrahim Mahama, Paola Pivi, Pipilotti Rist, Anri Sala, and Tino Sehgal.

=== New Museum, 2006–present ===
In 2006, Gioni joined the New Museum, New York as Director of Special Exhibitions, before being as appointed as the Edlis Neeson Artistic Director in 2014. In July 2026, following an international search, the New Museum announced Gioni's appointment as its next director, with the title of Toby Devan Lewis Director, effective August 1, 2026. He succeeds Lisa Phillips, who led the museum from 1999 and announced her retirement in 2025, becoming only the third director in the institution's history after founder Marcia Tucker and Phillips.

In 2021, Gioni joined the Beatrice Trussardi Foundation as artistic director, expanding his nomadic museum approach with art installations in unexpected locations internationally.

=== Exhibitions ===
Gioni has curated numerous international exhibitions and biennials including the 55th Venice Biennale (2013), the 8th Gwangju Biennale (2010), the first New Museum Triennial (co-curated with Lauren Cornell and Laura Hoptman in 2009), the 4th Berlin Biennale (co-curated with Maurizio Cattelan and Ali Subotnick in 2006) and Manifesta 5 (co-curated with Marta Kuzma in 2004).

At the New Museum Massimiliano Gioni has curated solo exhibitions by Ed Atkins, John Akomfrah, Paweł Althamer, Lynda Benglis, Paul Chan, Sarah Charlesworth, Roberto Cuoghi, Tacita Dean, Nicole Eisenman, Urs Fischer, Hans Haacke, Camille Henrot, Carsten Höller, Kahlil Joseph, Ragnar Kjartansson, Klara Liden, Sarah Lucas, Goshka Macuga, Gustav Metzger, Marta Minujin, Albert Oehlen, Chris Ofili, Carol Rama, Pipilotti Rist, Peter Saul, Jim Shaw, Anri Sala, Apichatpong Weerasethakul, Lynette Yiadom-Boakye, and Nari Ward, among others.

Gioni's group shows – which include "After Nature", "Ghosts in the Machine", "Here and Elsewhere", "NYC 1993: Experimental Jet Set, Trash and No Star", "Ostalgia", and "The Keeper" – have become signature initiatives of the New Museum program. Writing about 'Ostalgia' in 2021, art critic Jerry Saltz described Gioni as "master of his own form of large-scale exhibition as narrative, time machine, pleasurable pedagogy, historical potboiler come to life, and insight."

For the 55th Venice Biennale, Gioni curated the exhibition around the theme "Il Palazzo Enciclopedico" (The Encyclopedic Palace). The title was an homage to late outsider artist Marino Auriti's attempt to build an edifice containing all human knowledge. The exhibition brought together the work of professional artists showcased along the creations of amateurs, outsiders, and dilettantes. Among the many exhibits, it featured a presentation of Carl Gustav Jung's illuminated manuscript “The Red Book”.

Since 2015, he has organized the presentations of the Tony and Elham Salame Collection at the Aishti Foundation in Beirut, where he has curated three exhibitions, titled respectively “New Skin” (2015), "Good Dreams, Bad Dreams: American Mythologies" (2016), and "The Trick Brain" (2017) along with Urs Fischer's major solo exhibition in the Middle East: "The Lyrical and the Prosaic" (2019).

In 2017, he curated the exhibition "Giuseppe Penone: Matrice", produced by Fendi at the Palazzo della Civiltà Italiana in Rome. Gioni was also part of the commission of the Ministry of Cultural Heritage and Activities and Tourism that selected Giuseppe Penone's "Leaves of Stone" to be the first contemporary artwork to be permanently installed in the historic center of the city of Rome.

In 2018, in London at The Store X Gioni organized "Strange Days – Memories of the Future", an exhibition-anthology of video works originally presented at the New Museum.

In 2019, Gioni curated "The Warmth of Other Suns. Stories of Global Displacement", a collaboration between the New Museum and the Phillips Collection in Washington, D.C., and at Museo Jumex in Mexico City he curated "Appearance Stripped Bare: Desire and the Object in the Work of Marcel Duchamp and Jeff Koons, Even", the first exhibition to bring into dialogue the works of Marcel Duchamp and Jeff Koons – the show attracted more than 440,240 visitors, making it the most well-attended show in the museum's history and one of the most visited exhibitions of contemporary art in Mexico.

In 2021, Gioni served as part of the curatorial advisory group – composed of Naomi Beckwith, Glenn Ligon and Mark Nash – which supervised the posthumous realization of Okwui Enwezor's exhibition "Grief and Grievance: Art and Mourning in America", which had been originally conceived by Enwezor for the New Museum.

In June 2021, he organized "The Greek Gift", a small collective exhibition for the Dakis Ioannou, Deste Foundation's Slaughterhouse in Hydra, Greece.

In July 2021, he curated the inaugural installation for the Beatrice Trussardi Foundation by Polish sculptor Paweł Althamer. The installation, titled "Franciszek", saw a sculpture of St. Francis installed within a 17th-century mountain hut in the Engadin, Switzerland, made by the artist using found materials from the local area. It was accompanied by a 'real-time movie' performance created by the artist, and performed by actors and participating locals.

In September 2021, he curated George Condo's "The Picture Gallery" at the Long Museum in Shanghai, the artist's first major exhibition in Asia.

Also in 2021, Gioni curated Jeff Koons's major solo exhibition "Lost in America" at the Qatar Museum's Al Riwaq gallery in Doha.

== Other work ==
Gioni has contributed to many publications and magazines including Artforum, Flash Art (for which he served as US editor from 1999 to 2003), Frieze, Parkett, Tate Etc., among others. He directed the independent art magazines The Wrong Times and Charley alongside Maurizio Cattelan and Ali Subotnick. He is the commissioning editor of "2000 Words", a series of monographic books published by the Dakis Joannou Collection and Deste Foundation, with which he has frequently collaborated, curating numerous exhibitions and special projects in Athens.

Gioni has served as a juror for the Absolut Art Award, BMW Art Journey, Hugo Boss Prize, Mario Merz Prize, Edvard Munch Art Award, Future Generation Art Prize, Preis der Nationalgalerie-Hamburger Bahnhof, Kurt Schwitters Prize, and Vilcek Prize. In 2014, he was part of the selection committee that chose Giuseppe Penone, Nedko Solakov and Liam Gillick as the winners of the European Central Bank’s international competition for site-specific artworks at its headquarters in Frankfurt. In 2025, he was a member of the advisory panel that chose Lina Ghotmeh as architect of the Qatari Pavilion at the Venice Biennale.

== Personal life ==
Gioni is married to Cecilia Alemani, a curator and artistic director of the High Line in New York City. The couple has one son together and reside in the East Village, Manhattan, New York City.
