= Nicola Trussardi Foundation =

Non-profit art promotion institution

The Nicola Trussardi Foundation is a non-profit institution for the promotion of contemporary art and culture. Created in 1996, the Nicola Trussardi Foundation ran its own exhibiting space in Piazza della Scala in Milan.

From autumn 2003, under the direction of President, Beatrice Trussardi and with Artistic Director, Massimiliano Gioni, the Foundation changed strategy, becoming an agency for the production and the diffusion of contemporary art in a wide variety of contexts and channels. In order to explore new modes of presenting contemporary art, it started organizing contemporary art events and exhibitions in public spaces in the city of Milan.

The Foundation normally organises two major exhibitions a year as well as a series of publications, insertions in magazines and mail projects. Its declared mission is to invest all its resources and knowledge to produce culture's events and to make the most innovative research of contemporary artists available to everyone.

== Chronology of exhibitions 2003–2016 ==
- Short Cut by Elmgreen and Dragset from May 7 to June 4, 2003 – Ottagono, Galleria Vittorio Emanuele, Milan
- If I Had You by Darren Almond from November 4 to November 23, 2003 – Palazzo della Ragione, Milan
- Untitled by Maurizio Cattelan from May 5 to June 6, 2004 – Piazza XXIV Maggio, Milan
- Meechfieber by John Bock from November 9 to December 2004 – Sala Reale, Central Station, Milan
- Jet Set Lady by Urs Fischer from May 3 to June 1, 2005 – Istituto dei Ciechi, Via Vivaio 7, Milan
- Long Sorrow by Anri Sala from November 15 to December 18, 2005 – Circolo Filologico Milanese, Via Clerici 10, Milan
- I Like Things by Martin Creed from May 16 to June 18, 2006 – Palazzo dell'Arengario, Piazza del Duomo, Milan
- My Religion Is Kindness. Thank You, See You in the Future by Paola Pivi from November 14 to December 10, 2006 – Old Warehouse, Porta Genova Station, Via Valenza 2, Milan
- One of Many by Pawel Althamer from May 7 to June 5, 2007 – Palazzina Appiani, Sports Arena, Viale Byron 2, Milan
- Altri fiori e altre domande by Peter Fischli & David Weiss from January 30 to March 16, 2008, Palazzo Litta, Corso Magenta 24, Milan
- Tino Sehgal from November 11 to December 14, 2008, Villa Reale, Modern Art Gallery, Via Palestro 16, Milan
- Still Life – Nature morte by Tacita Dean from May 12 to June 21, 2009 – Palazzo Dugnani, Via Manin 2, Milan
- Pig Island by Paul McCarthy from May 20 to July 4, 2010 – Palazzo Citterio, Via Brera 14, Milan
- Parasimpatico by Pipilotti Rist from November 9 to December 18, 2011 – Cinema Manzoni, Via Alessandro Manzoni 42, Milan
- Rubble and Revelation by Cyprien Gaillard from November 13 to December 16, 2012 – Caserma XXIV Maggio, Via Vincenzo Monti 59, Milan
- Fault Line by Jennifer Allora & Guillermo Calzadilla from October 22 to November 24, 2013 – Palazzo Cusani, Via Brera 13–15, Milan
- Wheatfield by Agnes Denes from March to July, 2015 – Porta Nuova district, Milan
- The Great Mother from August 26 to November 15, 2016 – Palazzo Reale, Milan
- The Restless Earth, from April 28 to August 20, 2017 – Palazzo della Triennale, Milan
- Jeremy Deller: Sacrilege, from April 12 to April 15, 2018, CityLife Park, Milan
- Ibrahim Mahama: A Friend, from April 2 to April 14, 2019, Caselli Daziari di Porta Venezia, Milan

== Bibliography ==
- Panorama Milano, edited by Massimiliano Gioni, Fondazione Nicola Trussardi, Milan, 2003
- I Nuovi Mostri, edited by Massimiliano Gioni, Fondazione Nicola Trussardi, Milan, 2004
- What Good is the Moon? edited by Massimiliano Gioni, essays by Daniel Birnbaum, Stefano Boeri, Flavio Del Monte, Tacita Dean, Hans Ulrich Obrist, Michele Robecchi, Barbara Roncari, Tiziano Scarpa, Roberta Tenconi, Beatrice Trussardi and Catherine Wood, Hatje Cantz, Olstfildern, 2010
- The Great Mother, edited by Massimiliano Gioni and Roberta Tenconi, forewords by Giuliano Pisapia, Filippo Del Corno, Domenico Piraina and Beatrice Trussardi, Skira, Milan, 2015
