= Trussardi (disambiguation) =

Trussardi is an Italian fashion house, founded in 1911.

Trussardi may also refer to:

- Trussardi (surname)

== See also ==
- Nicola Trussardi Foundation, a non-profit institution for the promotion of contemporary art and culture
- Tusari
