= Šejla Kamerić =

Bosnian photographer

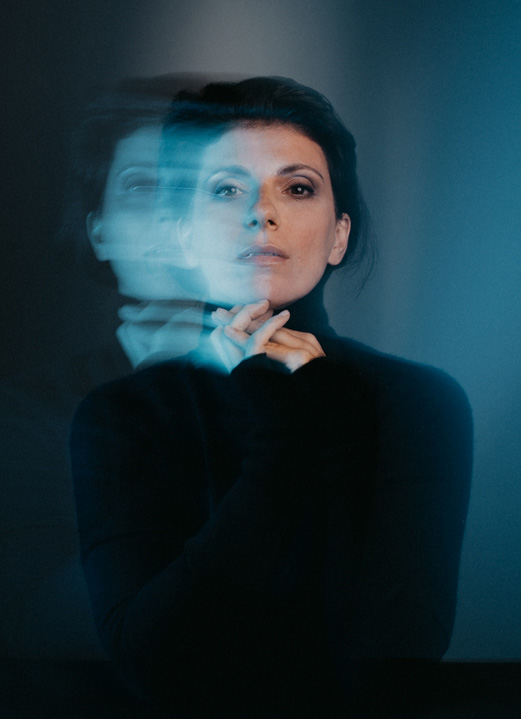
- Born: 1976 (age 49–50); Sarajevo, SR Bosnia and Herzegovina, SFR Yugoslavia
- Education: Academy of Fine Arts Sarajevo, Bosnia and Herzegovina
- Notable work: EU/Other, 2000; Basics, 2001; Bosnian Girl, 2003; Sorrow, 2005; 30 Years After, 2006; What Do I Know, 2007; Gluck, 2010; 1395 Days Without Red, 2011; Ab uno disce omnes, 2015; Embarazada, 2015; Thursday, 2015; Keep Away From Fire, 2018; We Come With a Bow, 2019; Behind The Scenes I, 2019; Behind The Scenes II, 2019
- Awards: DAAD Artists-in-Berlin Program Fellowship, 2007; The ECF Routes Princess Margriet Award for Cultural Diversity, 2011.

Šejla Kamerić (born 1976) is a Bosnian visual artist.

== Early life and education ==
Šejla Kamerić was born in Sarajevo, Bosnia and Herzegovina. As a child she lived in Dubai, where her father worked for several years as a volleyball coach. Her family returned to Sarajevo in the wake of the Yugoslav wars. When the war in Bosnia and Herzegovina started, Šejla Kamerić was 16 years old and had begun a career as a model for local and international fashion magazines and brands. She continued her modeling career during the early years of the war. During the Siege of Sarajevo, she graduated from the High School for Applied Arts, and enrolled in the Academy of Fine Arts Sarajevo, graduating from the Graphic Design department after the war. Between 1994 and 1997, she worked with the design group Trio, a group of young artists who designed a series of postcards Greetings from Sarajevo (1993) in attempt to draw international attention to the situation in the besieged Sarajevo. In 1997, she started to exhibit regularly in Sarajevo and internationally. During this period and until 2000, she was the art director of the advertising agency Fabrika. Since 2003 she was a member of the European Cultural Parliament. She was awarded with DAAD Artists-in-Berlin Program Fellowship in 2007 and continued to live and work in Berlin as a freelance artist. In 2011, Kamerić received The ECF Routes Princess Margriet Award for Cultural Diversity. Today she lives and works between Sarajevo and Berlin.

== Artistic practice ==
Šejla Kamerić works with various media such as film, photography, objects and drawings. Her own memories are a frequent element of her work. Based on her own experiences, memories, and dreams, her work describes global spaces of displacement and discrimination, insisting that the delicate and the sublime are not pushed aside by catastrophe or hardship. Rather, they exist simultaneously, revealing a complex, psychogeographic landscape and the tenacity of the human spirit.

Dunja Blažević in the catalogue of the exhibition “In the Gorges of the Balkans”, Fridericianum Museum, Kassel, Germany, 2003 wrote:

"What makes Šejla and the entire group of “war generation” artists essentially different from other members of their generation is the meaning inherent in their works, as opposed to the materials they use. Furthermore, in pursuing her work without worrying about what art really is or isn't, she proves herself a member of that generation born in the age of mass-media, in which the main references are the media and the reality around them, and not the history of art."

== Exhibitions and screenings ==
In 1997, Kamerić exhibited her work for the first time at the annual exhibition organized by SCCA - Sarajevo Center for Contemporary Art and curated by its director and renown art historian Dunja Blažević. In the following years, Kamerić worked closely with Blažević and continued to collaborate with SCCA. In this period Kamerić started to exhibit internationally. In 2000, she was invited to Manifesta III (entitled Borderline Syndrom) in Ljubljana, Slovenia. For this occasion, she made the installation EU/Others which received international acclaim and later became part of the TATE Modern collection.

Since then Kamerić has done numerous installations and interventions in public space: Closing The Border (2002); Bosnian Girl (2003); Pink Line vs. Green Line (2006); Ab uno disce omnes (2015), BFF (2015); SUMMERISNOTOVER (2014–2020).

Kamerić’s works have been on view in solo exhibitions at prestige art institutions such as Portkus in Frankfurt am Maine (2004); Galerie im Taxispalais in Innsbruck (2008); mumok in Vienna, Röda Sten Centre for Contemporary Art and Culture in Gothenburg, Wip: Konsthall in Stockholm and Centre Pompidou in Paris (2010); Museum of Contemporary Art in Zagreb, Camera Austria in Graz, ArtAngel in London and MACBA, Barcelona (2011); MG+MSUM - Museum of Contemporary Art in Ljubljana, Museum of Contemporary Art in Belgrade, Kunsthaus Graz, Sharjah Art foundation - Sharjah Art Museum and CAC Contemporary Art Centre in Vilnius (2012).

2015 was marked by two extensive solo exhibitions, at ARTER Space for Art, Istanbul and the National Gallery of Kosovo, Pristina. In the same year, Kamerić’s highly ambitious project Ab uno disce omnes, commissioned by Wellcome Collection, was shown in London as part of the exhibition Forensics: The anatomy of crime.

Her first short film What Do I Know premiered in the Corto Cortissimo section of the Venice International Film Festival in 2007 and has been screened since in more than 40 international film festivals. The film was awarded with Best Short Film at the 5th Zagreb Film Festival in 2007 and Best Fiction Film at International Adana Film Festival in 2008. A collaborative film project 1395 Days Without Red, done with Anri Sala and Ari Benjamin Meyers and produced by ArtAngel premiered at the Manchester International Festival in 2011. In the same year the film has been screened at the 17th Sarajevo Film Festival; MACBA, Barcelona and MSU - Museum of Contemporary Art, Zagreb. In 2015, Kamerić collaborated with Thai film director Anocha Suwichakornpong on a short film Thursday which premiered at the 44th International Film Festival Rotterdam 2015.

Kamerić has participated in numerous group exhibitions: The Real, The Desperate, The Absolute, Forum Stadtpark, Steirischer Herbst Festival, Graz, (2001); One Hundred Years of Contemporary Art of Bosnia and Herzegovina, National Gallery of Bosnia and Herzegovina, Sarajevo (2001); Prague Biennale; The Gorges of the Balkans, Kunsthalle Fridericianum, Kassel (2003); Passage d'Europe, Musée d'Art Moderne, Saint-Etienne (2004); Taboo / Tirana Biennale (2005); 15th Biennale of Sydney (2006); Tales of Time and Space, 1st Folkestone Triennial, Folkestone, (2008); Baltic Biennial of Contemporary Art, Szczecinie (2009); Gender Check: Femininity and Masculinity in the Art of Eastern Europe, mumok in Vienna and Zachęta National Gallery of Art, Warszaw (2010); Gwangju Biennale (2012); Tokyo Metropolitan Museum of Photography (2013); Hannah Ryggen Triennale, National Museum of Decorative Arts and Design, Trondheim (2016); The Restless Earth, Nicola Trussardi Foundation and La Triennale di Milano (2017); The Warmth of Other Suns: Stories of Global Displacement, The Phillips Collection in partnership with the New museum, Washington, D.C.; 2nd Coventry Biennial of Contemporary Art, Coventry; 4th Berliner Herbstsalon, Maxim Gorki Theater, Berlin (2019). In 2024, Kamerić participated in the 60th Venice Biennale with CEASE (Ars Aevi pavilion), and had a solo exhibition, Present Tense, at Cukrarna, Ljubljana.

== Works and films ==
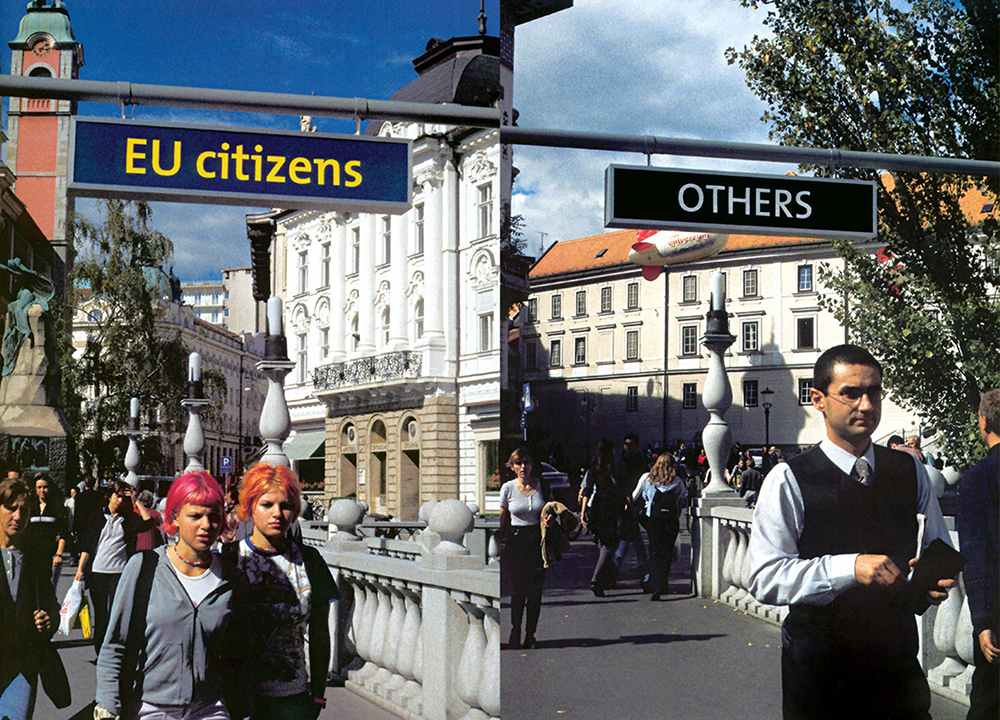
Public space intervention EU-Others (2000) for Manifesta III, at Tromostovje (Triple Bridge), in Ljubljana, Slovenia 2000

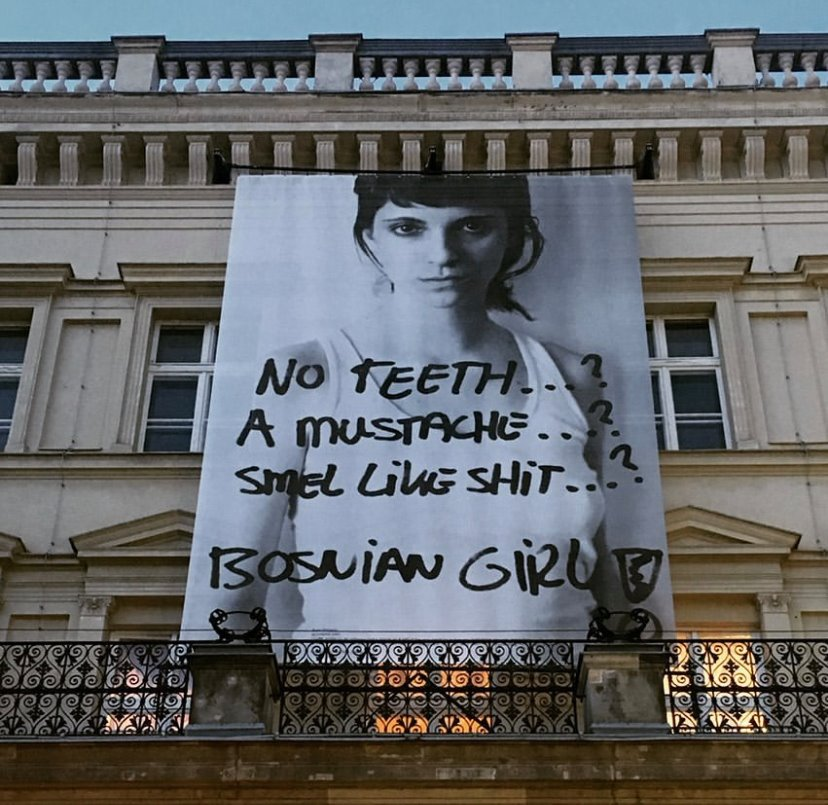
Bosnian Girl, 2003. Installation View for 4th Herbst Salon Berlin, at Maxim Gorki Theater, Berlin, 2019

- 1999 Zauzeto/Occupied
- 2000 EU/Others
- 2001 Basics
- 2002 Closing the Border
- 2002 Dream House
- 2003 Bosnian Girl
- 2004 FREI
- 2004 Imagine
- 2004 Untitled/Daydreaming
- 2005 Pink Line vs Green Line
- 2005 Sorrow
- 2006 30 Years After
- 2006 Pink Line vs. Green Line
- 2008 I Remember I Forgot
- 2009 If I Sleep It Will Be Double
- 2010 - 2012 Hooked
- 2011 - 2012 Red Carpet
- 2012 Ballot Box
- 2012 Measure
- 2013 June Is June Everywhere
- 2013 - 2019 Fragile Sense of Hope (Xglass)
- 2014 SUMMERISNOTOVER
- 2014 Missing
- 2015 Ab uno disce omnes
- 2015 BFF
- 2015 Embarazada
- 2015 Liberty
- 2017 Maze
- 2018 Keep Away From Fire
- 2019 We Come With A Bow
- 2019 Behind the Scenes I

=== Films ===
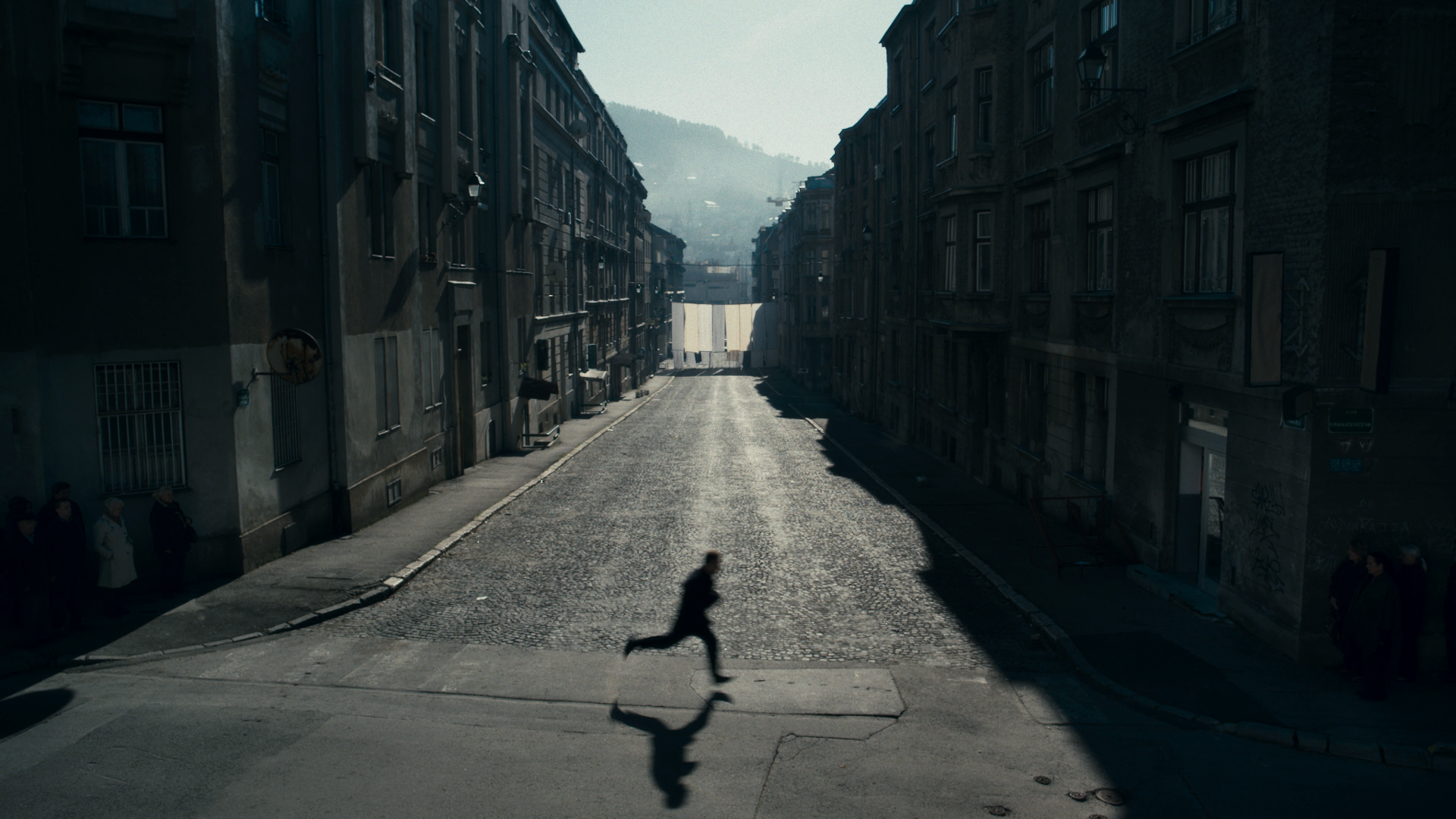
1395 Days without Red, still from 2011 movie of Šejla Kamerić and Anri Sala

- 2007 What do I know
- 2010 Glück
- 2011 1395 Days Without Red (in collaboration with Anri Sala and Ari Benjamin Meyer)
- 2013 Apollo - The First War Cinema (in collaboration with Almir Palata and Mark Casans)
- 2013 Shifts
- 2015 Thursday (in collaboration with Anocha Suwichakornpong)

=== Exhibitions ===
- Šejla Kamerić EX–YOU, 2026, Fotografiska Tallinn

== Awards ==
- 2004 ONFURI Award, National Art Gallery in Tirana
- 2004 Sloboda/Freedom Award, International Peace Center (Sarajevo Winter Festival) in Sarajevo
- 2005 Special Award, 46th October Salon in Belgrade (in collaboration with Uroš Đurić for work Parallel Life)
- 2007 Best Short Film Award at the 5th Zagreb Film Festival
- 2007 Best Fiction Film Award at the 15th International Adana Film Festival
- 2007 DAAD-Berlin Artist Residency Fellowship
- 2011 The ECF Routes Princess Margriet Award for Cultural Diversity

== Collections ==
Šejla Kamerić's works have been included in numerous collection worldwide, such as TATE Modern, London; Musée d'Art Moderne de la Ville, Paris; MACBA – Barcelona Museum of Contemporary Art; Museum Boijmans Van Beuningen, Rotterdam; Museum of Contemporary Art, Zagreb; Kontakt. The Art Collection of Erste Group and ERSTE Foundation, Vienna; Art Collection Telekom, Bonn; Vehbi Koç Foundation Contemporary Art Collection (2007+), Istanbul, permanent exhibition at the Memorial Center Potočari, Srebrenica and others.
