= Trussardi (surname) =

Trussardi is a surname. Notable people with the surname include:

- Beatrice Trussardi (born 1971), Italian businesswoman
- Luigi Trussardi (1938–2010), French jazz bassist
- Nicola Trussardi (1942–1999), Italian fashion designer and entrepreneur
