= Beatrice Trussardi =

Italian businesswoman (born 1971)

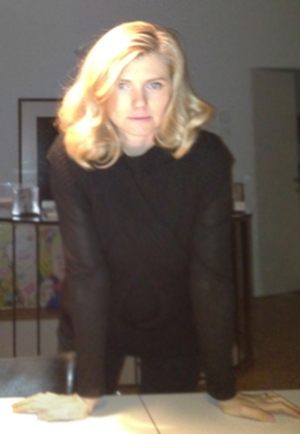
- Beatrice Trussardi
- Born: November 22, 1971 (age 54); Milan, Italy
- Education: New York University, Harvard University
- Occupations: President of the Beatrice Trussardi Foundation; President of Fondazione Nicola Trussardi
- Spouse: Federico Roveda

Beatrice Trussardi (born November 22, 1971) is an Italian businesswoman and Founder and President of the Beatrice Trussardi Foundation. Since 1999 she has been President of the Fondazione Nicola Trussardi. Since 2009 she has been on the executive committee of Aspen Institute Italy and President of the Friends of Aspen.

== Early life and education ==
Beatrice Trussardi was born in Milan in 1971 to Nicola Trussardi and Maria Luisa Gavazzeni, as the eldest of four siblings. She earned her degree in Art Business & Administration at New York University, going on to work with the Guggenheim Museum, the Metropolitan Museum of Art and the Museum of Modern Art. While employed in 2007, she enrolled in the Global Leadership and Public Policy for the 21st Century program at the John F. Kennedy School of Government at Harvard University.

== Career ==
=== Fondazione Nicola Trussardi ===
In 1999, Trussardi was appointed as President of the Fondazione Nicola Trussardi, founded by her father in 1996 to promote contemporary art and culture. In 2003, she directed the foundation's move from its exhibition space in Palazzo Marino alla Scala to develop a new itinerant model focused on exhibitions produced for public spaces, historical monuments, forgotten buildings and other symbolic, rarely accessible spaces in the city of Milan. As part of this redevelopment, Palazzo Litta, Palazzo Dugnani and Palazzo Citterio were partially restored and reopened to house major exhibitions and site-specific projects by artists such as Paul McCarthy, Tino Sehgal, Fischli & Weiss, Anri Sala, Pipilotti Rist and Maurizio Cattelan.

=== The Beatrice Trussardi Foundation ===
In 2021, Trussardi launched the Beatrice Trussardi Foundation, a nomadic art foundation, with artistic director Massimiliano Gioni. The non-profit organisation produces and exhibits site-specific art installations in international locations. The inaugural project "Franciszek" by Paweł Althamer opened in Sils-Maria, Switzerland, in July 2021. Issues such as climate change, identity and gender inequalities, human rights, innovation, and talent empowerment all sit at the core of its programme and research.

=== Trussardi Group ===
Since 1999, Trussardi has also held various positions within the family business. In 2003 she became president and CEO of Trussardi Group, occupying this position until 2014. She was replaced as president by her mother, Maria Luisa Trussardi, and as CEO by her brother Tomaso Trussardi.

=== Other activities ===
In 2005, she was one of 237 leaders selected by the World Economic Forum in 69 member countries to be part of its Young Global Leaders group. In 2007, she joined the Women's Leadership Board at the John F. Kennedy School of Government, a body founded at Harvard University to promote gender equality in society and politics. In 2009, she became President of the Friends of Aspen at Aspen Institute Italia, whose aim is to analyze and discuss important economic, social and cultural issues that are fundamental to development.

In 2012, the Italian Ministry of Cultural Heritage and Activities appointed her to the Board of Directors of MAXXI - Museo Nazionale delle Arti del XXI Secolo in Rome. In 2013, at the Invitation of the Italian Ministry of Foreign Affairs, she joined the International Board of the Women in Diplomacy Committee. In 2014, she joined the Board of Directors of Comitato Fondazioni Italiane Arte Contemporanea.

Trussardi sits on the executive committee of Associazione Volta and is a founding member of the Global Shapers Advisory Board in Milan. From 2018 to 2019, she worked for YOOX.com, part of YOOX NET-A-PORTER GROUP, as curator of the Design+Art area. Trussardi also sat on the Advisory Council of the Tent Partnership for Refugees. She is a member of the Italy-USA Foundation. As of September 2020, she is a member of the Italian Aspen Institute.

== Personal life ==
Trussardi is married to Federico Roveda and is the mother of two children.

== Awards and honors ==
- 2003: Premio ICE: Impresa & Cultura
- 2003: National Italian American Foundation Award
- 2003: Premio Marisa Bellisario
- 2004: Montblanc Arts Patronage Award
- 2010: Commendatore of the Order of Merit of the Italian Republic.
- 2012: Premio Piazza Mercanti – Milan Chamber of Commerce).
- 2016: America Award – Fondazione Italia-USA
- 2017: Premio Tecnovisionarie per l'Innovazione Artistica.
- 2019: 100 Most Successful Italian Women – Forbes Italia
