= Bosnian Girl =

2023 artwork by Šejla Kamerić

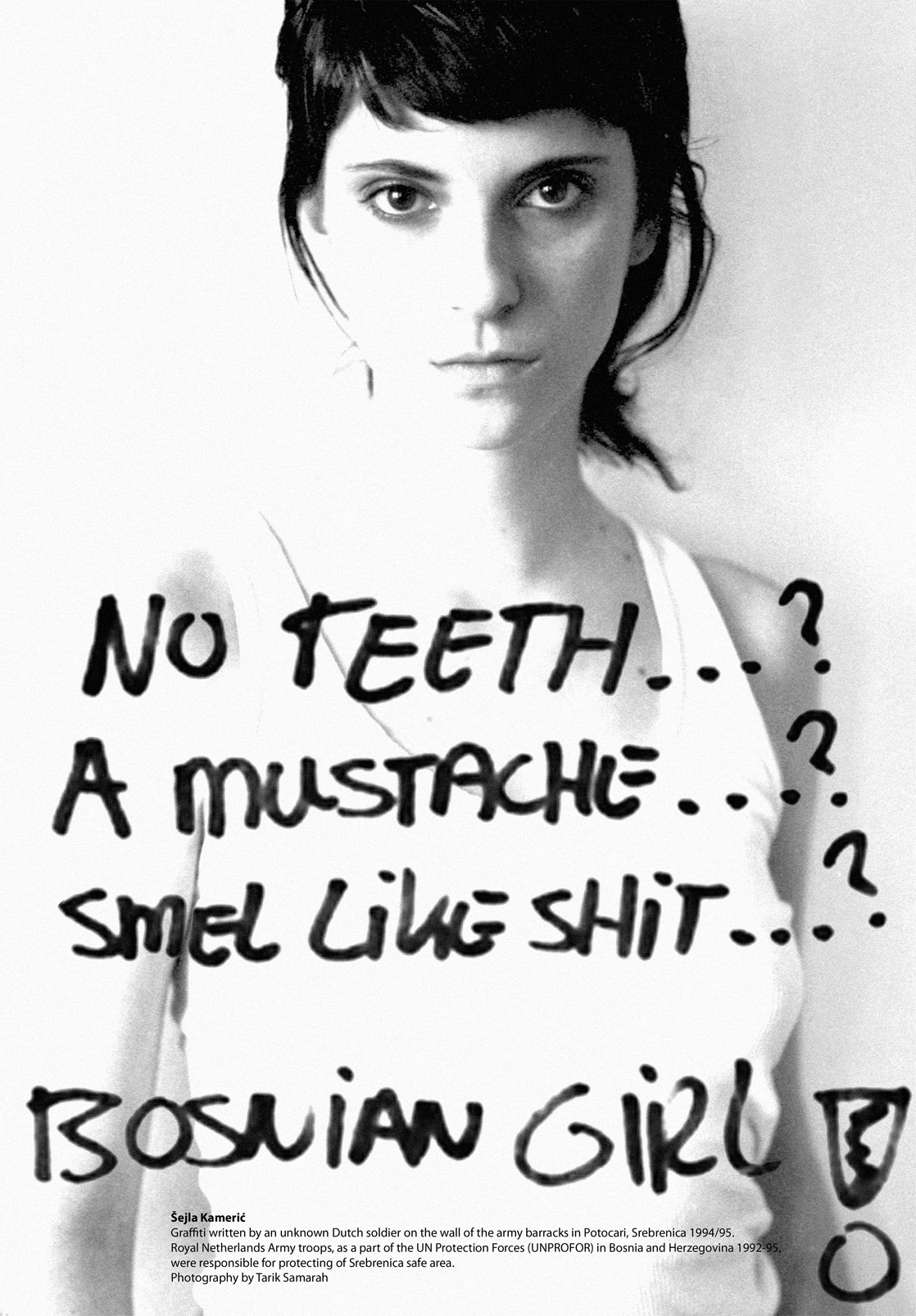
- Artist: Šejla Kamerić
- Year: 2003
- Medium: Postcards; posters; billboards

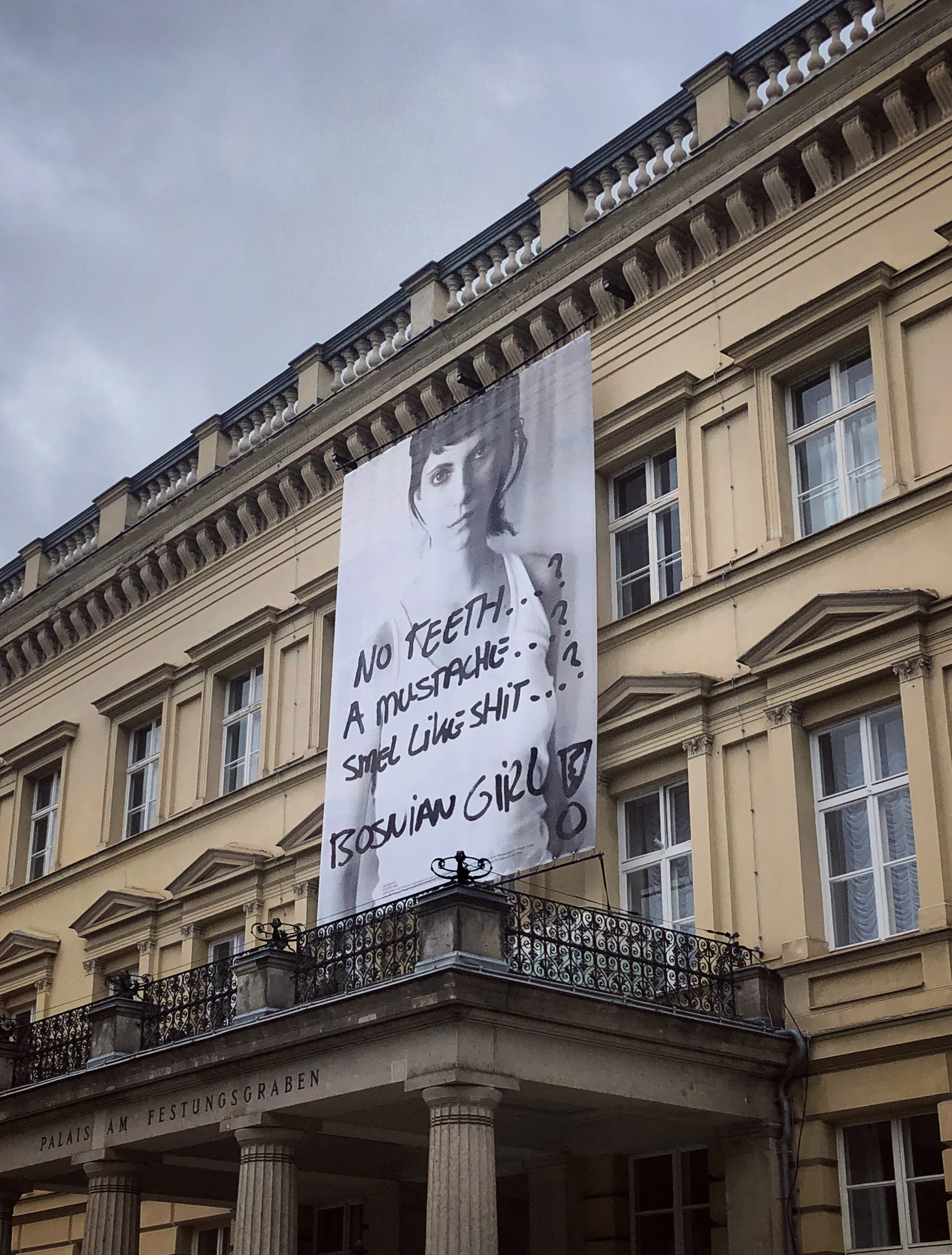
Šejla Kamerić, Bosnian Girl (2003), exhibition view at 4. Berliner Herbstsalon at Maxim Gorki Theatre, October–November 2019.

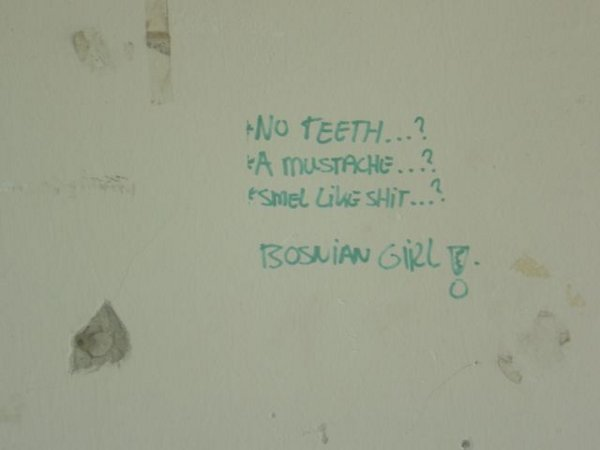
Original graffiti from Srebrenica

Bosnian Girl is a discriminator artwork by a visual artist Šejla Kamerić that started in 2003 as a public project consisting of postcards, posters, billboards, that is exhibited either as an intervention into public space or as a black and white photograph in various dimensions. It was done in collaboration with photographer Tarik Samarah. The title of the project is derived from an inscription in a bunker left by Dutchbat troops, reading "No teeth...? A mustache...? Smel [sic] like shit...? Bosnian girl!" during the Srebrenica massacre.

== Description and analysis ==
It is part of the multiple permanent exhibitions and museum collections, including in the Memorial Centre Potočari, Srebrenica, Bosnia and Herzegovina.

== Selected exhibitions ==
- 2003 The Gorges of the Balkans, curated by Rene Block, 30.08. – 23.11.2003, Kunsthalle Fridericianum, Kassel, Germany.
- 2003 Balkan Konzulat: Sarajevo, curated by Lejla Hodžić, October – November 2003, Rotor Gallery, Graz, Austria.
- 2004 Others and Dreams, solo show, 18.09.–24.10.2004, Portikus Frankfurt am Main, Germany.
- 2005 Another Expo – Beyond the Nation-States, curated by Shinya Watanabe, June 2005, Gallery Level1, Kitakyushu, Japan.
- 2005 Another Expo – Beyond the Nation-States, curated by Shinya Watanabe, September 2005, Gallery White Box, New York, USA.
- 2007 L‘enfer, C‘est les Autres / ‘Hell is… other people’, 22.07. – 09.09.2007, curated by Nathalie Zonnenberg, Stedelijk Museum Bureau Amsterdam, the Netherlands.
- 2008 Šejla Kamerić, 22.11.2008 – 25.01.2009, Galerie im Taxispalais, Innsbruck, Austria.
- 2008 Cutting Realities: Gender Strategies in Art, curated by Walter Seidl, 23.09.-29.11.2008, Austrian Cultural Forum, New York, USA.
- 2009 Gender Check – Femininity and Masculinity in the Art of Eastern Europe, curated by Bojana Pejić, 13.11.2009 – 14.11.2010, Museum of Modern Art (MUMOK), Vienna, Austria.
- 2009 Windows upon Oceans – 8. Baltic Biennial of Contemporary Art, Muzeum Narodowe w Szczecinie, Szczecin, Poland.
- 2010 A Pair of Left Shoes, curated by Tihomir Milovac, 16.04. –27.05.2010, Museum of Contemporary Art Zagreb, Croatia.
- 2010 No More Drama, Röda Sten Centre for Contemporary Art and Culture, Göteborg, Sweden.
- 2011 1395 Days without Red, Museum of contemporary art Belgrade, Serbia.
- 2012 9th Gwangju Biennale: Round Table, Artistic Co-directors: Sunjung Kim, Mami Kataoka, Carol Yinghua Lu, Nancy Adajania, Wassan AI-Khudhairi, Alia Swastika, 7 September – 11 November 2012, Various venues, Gwangju, South Korea.
- 2012 Šejla Kamerić – 1395 Days without Red, 30.11.2012 – 20.01.2013, CAC Contemporary Art Centre, Vilnius, Lithuania.
- 2013 Public Diary, 5th Yebisu International Festival for Art and Alternative Visions, curated by Keiko Okamura, 08. – 28.02. 2013, Tokyo Metropolitan Museum of Photography, Tokyo, Japan.
- 2014 Memory Lane – Contemporary Art Scene from Bosnia and Herzegovina, curated by Pierre Courtin, 07.06. – 26.07. 2014, Galerie du Jour-agnés b., Paris, France.
- 2015 Remember Lidice, curated by Rene Block, 12.09.2015 – 13.02.2016, Edition Block, Berlin, Germany.
- 2015 Autonomy of Self. Rejecting violence with the lens in former Ottoman territories, curated by Joy Stacy, 11.09. – 31.10.2015, P21 Gallery, London, UK.
- 2015 30 Years After, curated by Erzen Shkololli, 04.05. – 04.06.2015, National Gallery of Kosovo, Prishtina, Kosovo.
- 2015 When the Heart Goes Bing Bam Boom, curated by, curated by Başak Doğa Temür, 11.12. 2015 – 28.02.2016, Arter – Space for Art, Vehbi Koç Foundation, Istanbul
- 2018 I Really Really Really Really Really, curated by Peter Tomaž Dobrila, 09.11. – 01.12.2018, ACE Kibla, Maribor.

== Collections ==
- TATE Modern Collection, London
- Kontakt. The Art Collection of Erste Group and ERSTE Foundation, Vienna
- Art Collection Telekom, Bonn
- Vehbi Koç Foundation Contemporary Art Collection (2007+), Istanbul
- Haubrok Collection, Fahrbereitschaft, Berlin
- Memorial Center Potočari, Srebrenica

== Selected bibliography ==
- TOMAŠOVIĆ, Joško. "Šejla Kamerić" in: Andre/Others, Sørlandets Kunstmuseum, 2005, pp. 42–45.
- HODŽIĆ, Lejla. "Balkan Konsulat. Sarajevo", in: Balkan Konsulat (ed. Makovec, Margarethe and Lederer, Anton), <rotor> and Revolver, Graz-Frankfurt am Main 2006, pp. 96–111.
- BLAŽEVIĆ, Dunja. "Šejla Kamerić", in: Vodič kroz izložbu Kontakt Beograd …dela iz kolekcije Erste Bank Grupe, Muzej savremene umetnosti Beograd (20.01.-1.03.2007), (ed. Seidl, Walter and Stellwag-Carion, Cornelia), Kontakt. Umetnička kolekcija Erste Bank Grupe, 2007.
- BLOCK, Rene and BABIS, Marius (ed.). Die Balkan-Trilogie/The Balkan Trilogy, Kunsthalle Fridericianum, Kassel 2007.
- HELMS, Elissa. “East and West Kiss. Gender, Orientalism, and Balkanism in Muslim-Majority Bosnia-Herzegovina”, in: Slavic Review, vol. 67, no. 1., 2008, pp. 88–119
- HUGHS, Jeffrey and TURKOVIC, Dana (ed.). Odavde (from here), Otuda (from there), Webster University, St. Louis 2008
- MEREWETHER, Charles. "Unerledigte Angelegenheiten: Dream House and Bosnian Girl/Unifinshed Business: Dream House and Bosnian Girl" in: Portikus 2004-2007. Book of a Sleeping Village, Frankfurt am Main – Cologne 2008, pp. 109–119.
- SEIDL, Walter (ed.). Cutting Realities. Gender Strategies in Art. Works from Kontakt. The Art Collection of Erste Bank Group, Vienna 2008.
- ĐORĐEVIĆ, Tamara. “Postkolonijalne studije i Balkanizam: Bosnian Girl”, 2009
- NEUMAYR, Agnes. “Šejla Kamerić: Die Kunst vermag est, Vorurteile Aufzubrechen un das Bewusstsein der Menschen zu verandern”, in: Politik der Gefühle: Susanne K. Langer und Hannah Arendt, Innsbruck University Press, Innsburck 2009, pp. 354–369.
- PEJIĆ, Bojana (ed.). Gender Check: Femininity and Masculinity in the Art of Eastern Europe, Moderne Kunst Stiftung Ludiwg Wien, Vienna 2009
- MUKA, Edi. Šejla Kamerić, (ed.) Meral Agish, Galerie Tanja Wagner, Berlin 2011
- GRŽINIĆ, Marina. “Europe: Gender, Class, Race.”, in: The Scholar & Feminist Online, 10. 3. 2012
- HELMS, Elissa. “Bosnian Girl’: Nationalism and Innocence through Images of Women”, in: Retracting Images: Visual Culture After Yugoslavia (ed. Šuber, Danilo and Karamanić, Slobodan), 2012, pp. 193 – 222
- HOŠIĆ, Irfan. Iz/van konteksta. Ogledi i kritike iz umjetnosti, arhitekture i mode, Connectum Sarajevo, 2013
- HOYOS, Nathalie and SCHUMAHER Rainald (ed.). "Fragile Sense of Hope", Berlin 2014.
- BALIÇ, İlkay (ed.). Šejla Kamerić. When The Heart Goes Bing Bam Boom, ARTER, Istanbul 2015
- BLACKWOOD, Jonathan. Introduction to Contemporary Art in BiH, 2010.
- ĐELILOVIĆ, Asim. Muzej u Egzilu. Bosna i Hercegovina u modernom dobu (drugo dopunjeno izdajanje), Sarajevo 2015.
- MUKA, Edi (text). Šejla Kamerić. 30 Year After, National Gallery of Kosovo, Prishtina 2015.
- BUDEN, Boris. "Šejla Kamerić, Bosnian Girl, 2003", in: Kontakt (ed. Eiblmyr, Silvia, Ševčik, Jiří, Schöllhammer, Georg, Stipančić, Branka And Szymczyk, Adam), Vienna 2017, pp. 215–217.
- GOSLING, Lucinda, ROBINSON Hilary, TOBIN Amy (ed.). The Art of Feminism: Images that Shaped the Fight for Equality, 1857–2017, Chronicle Books LLC, San Francisco, 2018.
- ČVORO, Uroš. Transitional Aesthetics: Contemporary Art at the Edge of Europe, Bloomsbury Academic, 2018
