= Camille Henrot =

French artist

- Born: 21 June 1978 (age 48); Paris, France
- Education: École Nationale Supérieure des Arts Décoratifs
- Notable work: Grosse Fatigue (2013)
- Movement: Contemporary art
- Awards: Silver Lion (2013)

Camille Henrot (French pronunciation: [kamij ɑ̃ʁo]; born 21 June 1978) is a French artist who lives and works in Paris and New York City.

== Early life and education ==
Henrot was born in 1978 in Paris, France. She attended the École nationale supérieure des Arts Décoratifs where she studied film animation and soon after helped assist Pierre Huyghe who worked in advertising and making music videos.

== Work ==
Henrot’s work includes film, sculpture, drawing, painting, and installation.

=== Grosse Fatigue (2013) ===
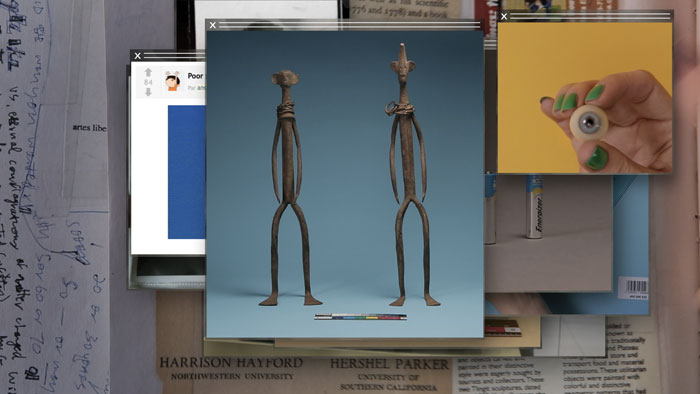
Grosse Fatigue, video still. Camille Henrot

Grosse Fatigue is a 13-minute color video that includes videos of screens, bodies, computer desktop, and computer windows. Henrot created Grosse Fatigue during her 2013 fellowship at the Smithsonian Institution in Washington D.C. The video makes use of themes such as insanity, madness, euphoria, and information overload.

With Grosse Fatigue, Henrot set herself the challenge of telling the story of the universe's creation. The text that provides the audio component of the work was written in collaboration with Jacob Bromberg, performed by artist Akwetey Orraca-Tetteh, and accompanied with music composed by Joakim.

The work was presented during the 2013 Venice Biennale, upon the invitation of curator Massimiliano Gioni. There, she received a Silver Lion for a Promising Young Artist.

The work was named by Frieze as No.19 of "The 25 Best Works of the 21st Century".

=== The Pale Fox (2014) ===
In 2014 the Chisenhale Gallery in London, in partnership with Kunsthal Charlottenborg, Copenhagen, Bétonsalon – Centre for art and research, Paris and Westfälischer Kunstverein, Münster, commissioned The Pale Fox, an exhibition comprising an architectural display system, found objects, drawing, bronze and ceramic sculpture and digital images. The project purports to articulate our desire to make sense of the world through the objects that surround us. A catalogue of the show, entitled Elephant Child, was published in 2016 by Inventory Press and Koenig Books.

=== "Bad Dad & Beyond" series (2015) ===
In 2015, Camille began a series of works that ponder the nature of authority figures. This series involved watercolors, interactive sculptures, and a zoetrope. For an exhibition at Metro Pictures, Henrot created a number of 3D printed telephones that connect to surrealist hotlines.

=== Saturday ===
Saturday is a 20-minute 3-D film that immerses the viewer into the religious practices of the Seventh-day Adventists, using footage of baptisms in the United States, Tonga, and Tahiti as a metaphor for resurrection and spiritual change. The work was part of the exhibit "Days Are Dogs" at the Palais de Tokyo in Paris in 2017.

=== Monday ===
This exhibition was held at Fondazione Memmo a museum in Rome, and is inspired by the first day of the week, Monday. It is made up of various bronze sculptures that are somewhere in between the figurative and abstract which depict the feelings some may experience during this day of the week.

=== Egyptomania ===
This slideshow shows pictures of objects related to Ancient Egyptian Art that were found on sale in 2009 on eBay. This slideshow attempts to answer the many unanswered questions about why this civilization is so influential through this compilation of images that create a mental fantasy Ancient Egypt. The associations between these objects was either symbolic or formal and included similarities in product or repetition of symbols such as pyramids and mummies which ties back to many perceptions people have with this culture.

=== Endangered Species ===
Endangered Species is a set of sculptures made up of car engine hoses from cars with wild animal names such as Ford, Mustang and Opel Tigra. These car productions have stopped and relate back to the idea of what is destined to disappear and this idea of ecological threat shifting into the automobile industry, therefore inspiring Henrot to use some shapes from Bambara masks from Mali for her sculptures.

=== Sphinx ===
This collection of drawings is made up of oil pastel on standard A4 paper which are exhibited on a metal board held up by magnets. They are an experiment of what happens to a form when it is repeated by hand to the point of exhaustion? Henrot repeats this drawing of a Sphinx onto dozens of sheets of paper until it almost becomes like a structured abstract pattern instead of a drawing. This brings up the question of where is the borderline between repeated decorative and narrative which might cause an object to have no meaning and simply becomes a decorative pattern.

=== Public commissions ===
In 2016 Henrot created the piece Ma Montagne (My Mountain) as a New patrons commission, at Pailherols, Cantal, France. In September 2026, Henrot was commissioned by the Public Art Fund to have a collection of 12 dog statues of varying material (concrete, cut stone, bronze) installed and displayed in Central Park.

== Exhibitions ==
Henrot has had solo exhibitions at the Baltimore Museum of Art (BMA), the Kunsthal Charlottenborg, the Musée des Beaux-Arts de Bordeaux, the Musée d'art contemporain de Montréal, the New Museum, and the New Orleans Museum of Art (NOMA).

== Honors and awards ==
In 2010 Henrot was nominated for the Marcel Duchamp prize. She won the Silver Lion Award at the Venice Biennale in 2013 for Grosse Fatigue. In 2014, she was a finalist for the Hugo Boss Prize. In 2014, she was a finalist for the Absolut Art Award. The same year she won the Nam June Paik Award. In 2015 she was awarded the Edvard Munch prize. Henrot was promoted to the rank of Officer of the Ordre des Arts et des Lettres (Order of Arts and Letters) on 23 March 2017.

== Other activities ==
In 2023, Henrot signed an open letter in support of the appointment of curator Mohamed Almusibli as director of Kunsthalle Basel.

== Art market ==
Henrot is represented by Hauser & Wirth and Galerie Kamel Mennour. She previously worked with Metro Pictures and Johann König (until 2022).
