= Patty Chang =

American film director

- Born: February 3, 1972 (age 54); San Leandro, California, U.S.
- Education: University of California, San Diego
- Occupations: Performance artist, film director

Patty Chang (born February 3, 1972, in San Leandro, California) is an American performance artist and film director living and working in Los Angeles, California. Originally trained as a painter, Chang received her Bachelor of Arts at the University of California, San Diego. It wasn't until she moved to New York that she became involved with performance art.

She has staged solo shows nationally and internationally, including at Jack Tilton Gallery, New York (1999), Museo National de Reina Sofia, Madrid (2000), the Hammer Museum, Los Angeles, Museum of Contemporary Art, Chicago, and the New Museum, New York (all 2005), Flotsam Jetsam with longtime collaborator David Kelley at the Museum of Modern Art, New York (2014), the Queens Museum (2017-18), the Museum of Fine Arts in Boston (2020), and Pioneer Works in Brooklyn (2021).

== Education, teaching, and awards ==
External videos
- "In Love" with Patty Chang, Video by Nicolas Jenkins

Patty Chang received a Bachelor of Arts at the University of California, San Diego in 1994, and studied abroad at L’Accademia Di Belle Arti in Venice, Italy, in 1993. She has held teaching positions at the Skowhegan School of Painting and Sculpture in Skowhegan, Maine, and her work has been recognized by cultural organizations, such as with a 2003 Rockefeller Foundation Award. Chang was a 2008 finalist for the Hugo Boss Prize and a Guna S. Mundheim Fellow in the Visual Arts at the American Academy in Berlin in Germany for fall 2008. In 2012, she received the Creative Capital Award in Visual Arts, and in 2014, she was a John Simon Guggenheim Memorial Foundation Guggenheim Fellow in Creative Arts—Fine Arts. Also, she received a grant program Anonymous Was A Woman Award (AWAW EAG) in 2018.

== Work ==
Chang's performative works deal with themes of gender, language and empathy, and she was described as "one of our most consistently exciting young artists" by The New York Times in 2005. Originally trained as a painter, she is primarily known for her short films, videos and performance art. Chang has participated in films as body dubbing which allows studios to remake films with more international casts.

Chang often plays a central role in her own work, testing the acceptable boundaries of taste and endurance. Some of her work contains scatological elements, while others critique perceptions of female sexual roles. Chang often denounces the problems that she observes in contemporary society by staging her own body in intensely difficult situations, documenting her actions through video and photography. She began to take a more "behind the scenes" role and became "perhaps the least visible she has ever been in her own work” in her 2005 exhibition Shangri-La based on the fictional location in James Hilton's 1933 novel Lost Horizon. More recent work, especially "Invocation for The Wandering Lake" (2015–16), draws connections between landscape and the body. Many aspects of Chang's work connect back to her Asian culture such as her interest in Shangri-La as well as her criticism of Asian female stereotypes in her work Contortion (2000). Milk Debt, her solo exhibition at Pioneer Works in Brooklyn drew on collective anxiety and featured a running script, read by women pumping their breast milk in Hong Kong, Santa Monica, Los Angeles, and the US-Mexico border.

In addition she has staged solo shows in major cities, including Patty Chang at Jack Tilton Gallery, New York (1999), Ven conmigo, nada contigo. Fuente. Melones. Afeitada. at Museo National de Reina Sofia, Madrid, Spain (2000), Patty Chang: Shangri-La at the Museum of Contemporary Art, Chicago and the New Museum, New York (2005), Flotsam Jetsam with longtime collaborator David Kelley at the Museum of Modern Art, New York (2014), and her most extensive exhibition to date, Patty Chang: The Wandering Lake, 2009-2017, at the Queens Museum, in New York City (2017-18). Her show The Wandering Lake also showed in Los Angeles. Chang exhibited at the Museum of Fine Arts in Boston where she was a part of Read My Lips that was up until May 2020.

== Filmography ==
Title	Release year
Gong Li with the Wind	1996
Paradice	1996
Melons (At a Loss)	1998
Shaved (At A Loss)	1998
Fountain	1999
Contorsion	2000
Losing Ground	2000
Hand to Mouth	2000
Eels	2001
In Love	2001
Shangri-La	2005
Condensation of Birds	2006
Flotsam Jetsam	2007
The Product Love – Die Ware Liebe	2009
Rather to Potentialities	2009
Route 3	2011
Current	2012
Invocation for a Wandering Lake, Part 1	2014
Spiritual Myopia	2015
Configurations	2017
Milk Debt (still)	2020
Milk Debt	2021

== Selected exhibitions ==
Year	Exhibition	Location
2005	Patty Chang	Hammer Museum in Los Angeles
2006	The 1st at Moderna: Patty Chang	Moderna Museet
2008	New Directors/New FIlms Festival	The Museum of Modern Art
2014	Flotsam Jetsam / Patty Chang and David Kelley	The Museum of Modern Art
2018	Patty Chang: The Wandering Lake, 2009–2017	Queens Museum, New York
2020	Patty Chang: Ven conmigo, nada contigo. Fuente. Melones. Afeitada	Museo Nacional Centro de Arte Reina Sofía
2020-2021	Patty Chang: Milk Debt	18th Street Arts Center
