= Gallery 11/07/95 =

- Established: 12 July 2012
- Location: Sarajevo, Bosnia and Herzegovina
- Type: Art gallery
- Collection size: 10,000
- Director: Tarik Samarah
- Curator: Anela Hakalović
- Website: galerija110795.ba

The Gallery 11/07/95 is a memorial art gallery located in Sarajevo, Bosnia and Herzegovina. It is a public institution dedicated to preserving the memory of the Srebrenica genocide. It was established on 12 July 2012 by a team headed by Bosnian photographer Tarik Samarah in cooperation with the governments of the Sarajevo Canton and the Republic of Turkey. The gallery is housed in an Austro-Hungarian building overlooking the Sacred Heart Cathedral.

The gallery's showpiece is a permanent exhibition that provides documentary and archive material from the town of Srebrenica before, during and after the genocide. Through a wide range of multimedia content that includes photographic images, maps, audio and video material, the gallery offers documentary and artistic interpretations of the events that took place in the town during the month of July 1995. It was a finalist for the European Museum of the Year Award in both 2016 and 2017.

As stated by the gallery's management, its aim is "to be a strong and decisive voice against all forms of violence in the world. Srebrenica is a symbol – not only of the war in Bosnia and Herzegovina, but also of the suffering of innocent people and the indifference of others." The concept of the project is "a museum-gallery hybrid", that blends artistic and documentary forms by using various audio-visual mediums.

Apart from its permanent exhibition, the gallery also organizes numerous short-term exhibitions and has hosted works by various international artists, photographers and photojournalists such as Narciso Contreras, Ron Haviv, Luc Delahaye, Manuel Rivera-Ortiz, Michelangelo Pistoletto and others.
