= Marta Kuzma =

American art curator, theorist, and educator (born 1964)

- Born: June 21, 1964 (age 62); New Jersey
- Education: Barnard College (BA); Middlesex University (MA)
- Known for: Dean of Yale School of Art

Marta Kuzma (born June 21, 1964) is a curator, art theorist, and educator. In 2016, she became Dean of the Yale School of Art and is the first woman to serve in that role since the school was founded in 1869.

== Early life and education ==
Kuzma was born in New Jersey on June 21, 1964. She holds a B.A. in Art History and Political Economics from Barnard College and an M.A. in Aesthetics and Art Theory from the Centre for Research in Modern European Philosophy at Middlesex University, London.

== Academic career ==
Kuzma was previously the vice chancellor and rector of the Stockholm Royal Institute of Art since 2014. Prior to her tenure at the Royal Institute of Art, Kuzma also served eight years as director of the Office for Contemporary Art Norway. In this role, she curated OCA's contribution to the Venice Biennial with the projects "The Collectors: Elmgreen & Dragset" (2009), "The State of Things" (2011), and "Beware of the Holy Whore: Munch and the Dilemma of Emancipation" (2013). She was also the founding director of the Soros Center for Contemporary Art in Kyiv, Ukraine, the artistic director of the Washington Project for the Arts, in Washington, D.C., and was head of international exhibitions program at International Center of Photography in New York. In 2004, she co-curated Manifesta 5 with Massimiliano Gioni in San Sebastian, Spain and in 2012 and she was a curator for Documenta (13). In 2026, Kuzma was a member of the International Jury of the 61st International Art Exhibition of La Biennale di Venezia.
