= John Bock =

German artist

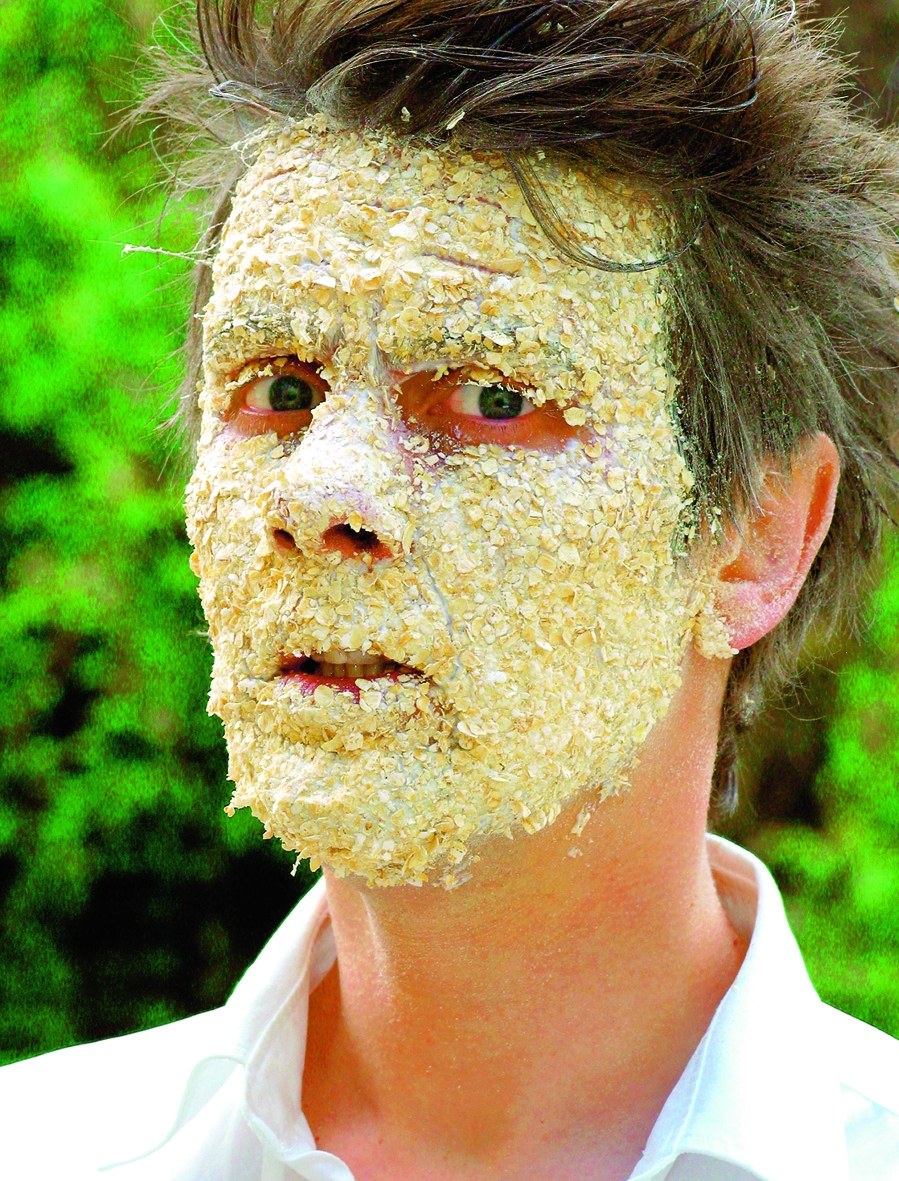
- Bock in 2004
- Born: 1965 (age 60–61); Schenefeld, Steinburg, Germany
- Occupation: Artist

John Bock (born 1965 in Schenefeld, Germany) is a German artist. He studied in Hamburg, Germany and lives and works in Berlin.

== Work ==
Bock is a multi-media artist primarily known for his performances. Since 1991, he creates environments hand crafted from found materials which function as symbolic settings for his "lectures." More recently there has been an increased production of film and video work.

In his "lectures", Bock acts on "stages" built from tables, cupboards or multi-level wood constructions. The objects are handmade or re-modeled accessories of the lecture, made out of clothing, electrical equipment such as hoovers and mixers, or "plastic diagrams" that illustrate his mathematical explanations. After the lecture, they are left on the stage which thus forms a "theatrical collage". The "lectures" are structured by different scenes in which Bock sometimes works with (non-professional) actors; frequently he plays pop songs or classical pieces from a record player. The lecture is mostly recorded on video. The film is then integrated in the installation, documenting the lecture throughout the exhibition.

Bock has been professor for sculpture at the Academy of Fine Arts of Karlsruhe since 2004.

== Exhibitions ==
Bock participated in numerous international exhibitions, among others the Venice Biennial (1999 and 2005) and the documenta 11 in Kassel (2002). He has also had solo exhibitions in a number of international institutions including MoMA and the New Museum in New York, Kunst-Werke Institute for Contemporary Art in Berlin, Kunsthalle in Basel, Secession, Wien, and the Institute of Contemporary Arts in London.

He has participated in various group shows including Martian Museum of Terrestrial Art, Barbican Centre, London, and "Laughing in a Foreign Language", The Hayward Gallery, London, both in 2008. John Bock: Maltreated Frigate, a monograph of his work, was published by Walther Koenig Ltd, 2007.

Bock is represented by Galerie Klosterfelde, Berlin, Anton Kern Gallery, New York, and Regen Projects, Los Angeles.

=== Selected exhibitions ===
Source:

=== Germany ===
City	Venue	Type	Collection/Installation	Year(s)
Berlin	Staatsoper unter den Linden	Individual	John Bock’s Medusa im Tam Tam Club	2006
Berlin	Deutsche Guggenheim		Kunst und Papier auf dem Laufsteg [Art and paper on the catwalk]	1998
Berlin	Element		Am Tüddelband der Liebeselastizität	1997
Berlin	Gagosian Gallery	Collective	The Addiction	2005
Berlin	Haus der Kulturen der Welt	Individual	The greased bendsteering in the luggage gets tangled up with the white shirt (German: Die abgeschmierte Knicklenkung im Gepäck verheddert sich im weissen Hemd)	2009
Berlin	Haus am Waldsee	Collective	Anstoss Berlin, Kunst Macht Welt	2006
Berlin	Klosterfelde Edition		Das Gängelband der Kunstwohlfahrt	1997
Berlin	Klosterfelde Gallery	Individual	ArtemisiaSogJod – Meechwimper Lummerig	2000
Berlin	Klosterfelde Gallery	Individual	John Bock: Lütte mit Rucola, Klosterfelde	2006
Berlin	Klosterfelde Gallery	Individual	OHR-WALACHEI	2011
Berlin	Kraftwerk Berlin	Individual	Paramoderne = Rokokkogobrot	1999
Berlin	KW Institute for Contemporary Art	Collective	Berlin Biennal	1999
Berlin	Schinkel Pavillon			2011
Berlin	Sprüth Magers	Individual	1 = 2 + Kleinodtod	2000
Berlin	Temporäre Kunsthalle	Individual	FischGrätenMelkStand	2010
Berlin		Collective	Berlin Biennale (LiquiditätsAuraAromaPortfolio)	1998
Bonn	Bonner Kunstverein	Individual	Im Dilemma der ExistoEntropie	2001
Bonn	Kunstmuseum Bonn	Collective	Zeitwenden – Rückblick & Audblick	1999
Bonn	Kunst- und Ausstellungshalle der Bundesrepublik Deutschland	Individual	Im Modder der Summenmutation	2013
Bremen	Gesellschaft für Aktuelle Kunst	Individual		2000
Cologne	Austellungsraum Schnitt			1999
Frankfurt			Die Dreckschleuder	1996
Freiburg im Breisgau	Kunstverein Freiburg		Koppel op Kop. ars viva 1999-2000	1999
Freiburg im Breisgau	Museum für Neue Kunst	Collective	Works from the Boros Collection	2004
Hamburg	Das Trojanische Schiff		Der Fremde in der 4. Etag	1995
Hamburg	Friedensallee 12		Das Kunstwerk des 21. Jahrhunderts	1995
Hamburg	Friedensallee 12		Komparativer Kunstfähigkeitsvorteil	1993
Hamburg	Golden Pudel Club		Mord und Robotermalerei	1992
Hamburg	Hamburger Bahnhof Museum für Gegenwartskunst	Individual	PestKOP im black rebel motorcycle club	2005
Hamburg	Helga Maria Klosterfelde		Meechfieber im Paradoxonmodderkarton	1998
Hamburg	Klosterfelde Gallery	Individual	Ma’am prosciutto crudo	2001
Hamburg	Kunsthaus Hamburg		Kunstkarton	1994
Hamburg	Kunstverein in Hamburg	Individual	Der Pappenheimer	2013
Hamburg	KX. Kunst auf Kampnagel		Rasputin ist Mütterchen	1997
Hamburg	University of Fine Arts of Hamburg		4 x Rezipientenmodelle	1993
Hamburg	University of Fine Arts of Hamburg		Das Feld	1995
Hamburg	University of Fine Arts of Hamburg		Der kleine Rezipient und der grosse Rezipient	1993
Hamburg	University of Fine Arts of Hamburg		Die dynamische Nacht des Titerus	1996
Hamburg	University of Fine Arts of Hamburg		Die Kunstwohlfahrtsmaschine	1993
Hamburg	University of Fine Arts of Hamburg		Die molekulare Heimsuchung des Herrn 0,47	1997
Hamburg	University of Fine Arts of Hamburg		Elephant	1993
Hamburg	University of Fine Arts of Hamburg		Gribbohm	1996
Hamburg	University of Fine Arts of Hamburg		Haschkeks	1993
Hamburg	University of Fine Arts of Hamburg		Heilung Nr. 4	1994
Hamburg	University of Fine Arts of Hamburg		Jackson - Action	1992
Hamburg	University of Fine Arts of Hamburg		Kunst – Mädchen – Erfolg – Tod	1992
Hamburg	University of Fine Arts of Hamburg		Paul Eluard Gesichtskorrektur	1992
Hamburg	University of Fine Arts of Hamburg		Wie werde ich breühmt?	1992
Hamburg	Westwerk		Törtchen der Leidenschaft	1994
Hanover	Expo 2000	Collective	Captain Sheriff Schippert Dröge	2000
Hanover	Kunstverein Hanover		home and away	1999
Hanover	Sprengel Museum	Individual	Dionysische Monologicus – Gelüste eines Schwachomate	2000-2001
Heidelberg	Heidelberger Kunstverein	Collective	Artists as Collectors	2007
Karlsruhe	Laurids & Mattheus		BommelbabyfaceNelson	1998
Leverkusen	Morsbroich Museum	Collective	Freestyle: Werke aus der Sammlung Boros	2001
Munich	Haus der Kunst	Collective	“Aller Anfang ist Merz – von Kurt Schwitters bis heute”	2001
Munich	Neuer Marstall	Individual	Rasputin ist Mütterchel	1999
Wolfsburg	Kunstmuseum Wolfsburg	Collective	German Open : Gegenwartskunst in Deutschland	1999

==== Europe ====
Country	City	Venue	Type	Collection/Installation	Year(s)
Austria	Bregenz			Quasi-ich-isoquantenschar-Kammer	1999
Austria	Graz	Grazer Stadtraum	Collective	RE_public	2000
Austria	Graz	Steirischer Herbst		Von der Kunst bis zum Warten + drinnen Jungtiere	1999
Austria	Innsbruck	Kunstraum Innsbruck	Collective	Soufflé, eine Massenausstellung	2007
Austria	Linz	OK Center for Contemporary Art Austria	Individual	Ma’am prosciutto crud	2000
Austria	Mönchengladbach	Abteiberg Museum		Regardez le Diskjockey Long John Silver “El Niño”	1998
Austria	Offenbach am Main	Klingspor Museum		Silageproppen verstopft den Streptopenfluss im Love-Time-Mluiplikator	1998
Austria	Schwaz	Galerie der Stadt Schwaz		$1.000.000 Knödel Kisses, pfüti	1999
Austria	Vienna			MienGribbohmWien	1998
Austria	Vienna	Charim Galerie	Collective	SoonSonicShySONSupernovaSide UP	1999
Austria	Vienna	Museum moderner Kunst Stiftung Ludwig Wien	Collective	Zeitwenden - Rückblick und Ausblick	2000
Belgium	Antwerp	Der heilige Anwalt in Antwerpen		Lokaal 05	1996
Belgium	Antwerp	Stella Lohaus Gallery	Individual	A-Buba	2005
Belgium	Antwerp	Stella Lohaus Gallery		Yes Sir No Sir	1999
Belgium	Ghent	Stedelijk Museum voor Actuele Kunst	Collective	Memme muss schlafen opening exhibition of S.M.A.K.	1999
Belgium	Maastricht			Der Onkel im Koffer	1996
Denmark	Aarhus	ARoS Aarhus Kunstmuseum			1999
Denmark	Copenhagen	Jacob Fabricius	Collective	"New Settlements"	2000-2001
England	London	Barbican Centre	Individual	Curve-Vehicle incl. π-Man-(.), The Curve	2010
England	London	Barbican Centre	Collective	Martian Museum of Terrestrial Art	2008
England	London	Hayward Gallery	Collective	Laughing in a Foreign Language	2008
England	London	Institute of Contemporary Arts	Individual	Klutterkammer	2004
England	London	Program	Collective	Rough Diamond	2005
England	London	RCA Galleries	Individual	MEECHbuildings – “playing among the ruins”	
England	London	Sadie Coles HQ	Individual	John Bock	2007
England	London	Sadie Coles HQ	Individual	John Bock	2001
France	Lyon		Collective	8th Biennale d'art contemporain de Lyon	2005
France	Marseille	FRAC Provence-Alpes-Côte d’Azur	Individual	John Bock	2005
France	Paris	Fondation Cartier pour l'Art Contemporain	Collective	Dionysiac	2005
Greece	Athens	Eleni Koroneou Gallery	Individual	No Time No Screws	2009
Greece	Athens	Eleni Koroneou Gallery	Collective	The Harder You Look	2007
Greece	Athens	Eleni Koroneou Gallery			2001
Greece	Athens	Eleni Koroneou Gallery	Individual	Regardez le Diskjockey Long John Silver	1999
Greece	Athens	Technopolis		Nai Aristoteles Ochi – Nichtsabsolut	1999
Greece	Athens	Mikrokosmos Cinema	Individual	Film Retrospective	2008
Iceland	Reykjavík	Kling og Bang	Individual	Skipholt	2005
Iceland	Reykjavík	Reykjavik Art Museum	Collective	Reykjavík Arts Festival	2005
Ireland	Cork	Lewis Glucksman Gallery	Collective	Beyond the Country	2007
Italy	Milan	Gió Marconi Gallery	Individual	Inside Beyond	2008
Italy	Milan	Gió Marconi Gallery	Individual	John Bock	2003
Italy	Milan	Gió Marconi Gallery		opt. APE trouvé Moving 50 Diagram	1999
Italy	Milan	Nicola Trussardi Foundation	Individual	John Bock	2004
Italy	Milan	Padiglione d'Arte Contemporanea	Collective	LA FORMA DEL MONDO/LA FINE DEL MONDO	2000
Italy	Siena	Palazzo Piccolomini	Individual	MultiplexQuasiSiena – “le repubbliche dell’ arte germania”	2001
Italy	Siena	Centro d’Arte Contemporanea			2001
Italy	Venice		Collective	International Art Exhibition of La Biennale di Venezia	2013
Italy	Venice		Collective	Venice Biennale	2005
Italy	Venice		Collective	48th Venice Biennale	1999
Luxembourg	Casino Luxembourg			Existo – Tour 99 “ars viva – Gernzgänge”	1999
Netherlands	Amsterdam	Netherlands Media Art Institute	Collective	(......) – Surrogat	2006
Scotland	Edinburgh	Fruitmarket Gallery	Collective	Dada's Boys	2006
Spain	Málaga	Centro de Arte Contemporáneo de Málaga	Individual	Nöle	2010
Spain	San Sebastián	European Biennial of Contemporary Art	Collective	Manifesta 5	2004
Sweden	Malmö	Malmö Konsthall	Collective	The Hamsterwheel	2008
Switzerland	Basel	Klosterfelde		MolkeMeMindVehikle	1999
Switzerland	Basel	Kunsthalle Basel	Individual	Lombardi Bängli	1999

=== Americas ===
Country	City	Venue	Type	Collection/Installation	Year(s)
Mexico	Mexico City	Jumex Foundation		Lost-Egg in the Desert	2011
United States	Los Angeles		Collective	The High Desert Test Sites (Palms)	2007
United States	Los Angeles	REDCAT	Individual	Palms	2008
United States	Los Angeles	Regen Projects	Individual	John Bock	2007
United States	Los Angeles	Regen Projects	Individual	Lichterloh / roh	2011
United States	Miami	The Moore Loft		Zero Hero	2006
United States	New York City	Anton Kern Gallery		Bendix Harms Lebenslieben	2008
United States	New York City	Anton Kern Gallery	Individual	John Bock	2010
United States	New York City	Anton Kern Gallery	Individual	John Bock – Mit Schisslaveng	2006
United States	New York City	Anton Kern Gallery		Maybe-Me-Be-Microworld	1999
United States	New York City	Barneys, Madison Avenue	Collective	Into the Quasi-Me-Hill	2012
United States	New York City	Gagosian Gallery	Collective	Fit to Print: printed media in recent collage	2007
United States	New York City	Solomon R. Guggenheim Foundation	Collective	Hugo Boss Prize	2006
United States	New York City	Museum of Modern Art	Individual	Multiple Quasi-Maybe-Me-Be-Updown (fashion show)	2000
United States	New York City	PS1		MolkeMeHindVehikel “Children of Berlin”	1999
United States	New York City	Nyehaus		Abnormal	2005
United States	New York City	Zwirner & Wirth	Collective	Girls on Film	2005
United States	New York City	Water Mill	The Watermill Center	Lecker Puste (Delicious Breath)	2012

=== Asia + Oceania ===
Country	City	Venue	Type	Collection/Installation	Year(s)
New Zealand	Auckland			Pizza Kiwi Nazionale	2000
South Korea	Seoul	Insa Art Space			2008

== Lectures ==
- 2000: Four Lectures, Museum of Modern Art, New York
  - “Aller Anfang ist Merz – von Kurt Schwitters bis heute”, Sprengel Museum, Hannover, Germany, 6 June
  - Gribbohm meets Mini-Max society, (lecture 4, MoMA N.Y.C.)
  - thread waxing space, “death race”, Brooklyn, Dec.
- 2009: Lecture / Fashion Show The greased bendsteering in the luggage gets tangled up with the white shirt (in German: Die abgeschmierte Knicklenkung im Gepäck verheddert sich im weissen Hemd) at HKW, Haus der Kulturen der Welt, Berlin, Germany

== See also ==
- Robecchi, Michele, "John Bock: A Man in Space", Flash Art, January–February, 2005, p. 92-95.
- Galloway, David, "Spray the Ketchup, Fling the Lettuce", ARTnews, May, 2006
- Coulson, Amanda, "John Bock", Frieze, Issue 111, November–December, 2007
- O'Reilly, Sally, "John Bock: Hide and Seek", Art Review, 2007, p. 52-59.
- Millard, Coline, "John Bock", Modern Painters, July 15, 2010
- Smith, Roberta, "Art in Review: John Bock", The New York Times, April 2, 2010
- Tsitsovitis, Yannis, "John Bock's Unorthodox Machines", Under/Current Magazine Vol. 6, 2011, p. 144-149.
