= Nicola Trussardi =

Italian fashion entrepreneur (1942–1999)

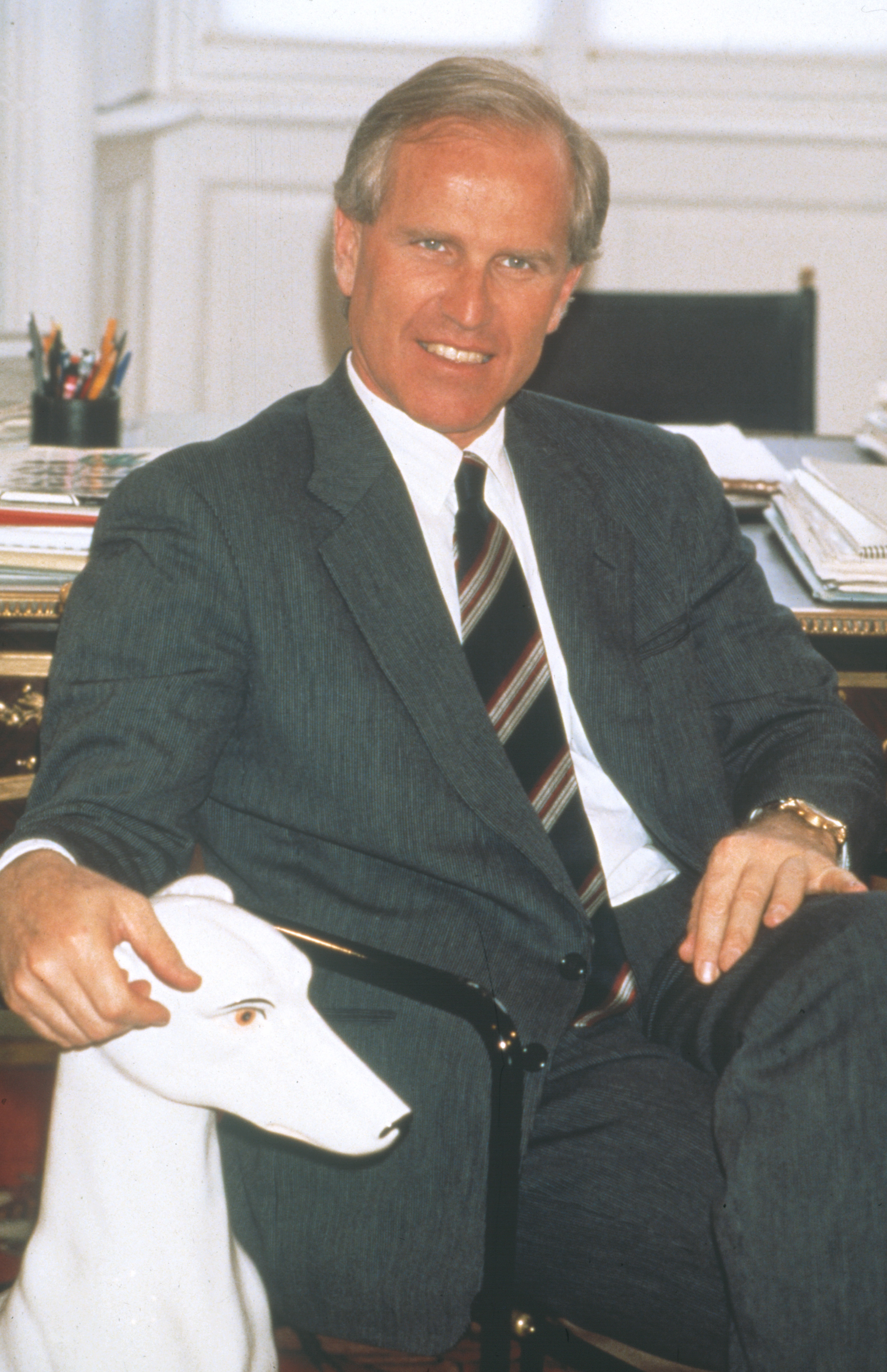
- Born: 17 June 1942; Bergamo, Italy
- Died: 14 April 1999 (aged 56); Milan, Italy
- Education: BA Commerce and Economics
- Alma mater: Catholic University of Milan
- Occupation: Fashion designer
- Years active: 1970–1999
- Known for: Expanding the Trussardi fashion line internationally
- Spouse: Marialuisa Trussardi

Nicola Trussardi (17 June 1942 – 14 April 1999) was an Italian fashion designer and entrepreneur. He took over the Trussardi fashion line in 1970 and built the small glove-maker into an international brand. He also led the restoration of the Marino alla Scala in Milan. The Nicola Trussardi Foundation was named in his honor.

== Early life ==
Trussardi was born in Bergamo, Lombardy. In 1968 Trussardi graduated from the Catholic University of Milan in Commerce and Economics.

== Career ==
In 1970, he started working in his family's glove-making business, which was founded in 1910 by his grandfather Dante Trussardi, following the death of his older brother. Near the end of the 1970s he took the business over entirely after the death of his father. Trussardi turned it into a major company that helped contribute to the popularity of the made-in-Italy label throughout the world. He expanded Trussardi's product line beyond gloves to include luxury accessories, and in 1973 he created Trussardi's spiky greyhound logo. A few years later, Trussardi launched a line of leather jackets, the first step toward a ready-to-wear line which, by the 1980s, encompassed womenswear, menswear, sportswear and children's wear. In 1985 the once small family business was now worth $182 million, and he had opened about 120 stores and franchises around the world, with Trussardi owning ten of them himself. Trussardi personally took on some of the special projects the company was hired to do, such as designing airplane and helicopter interiors.

In 1988, Trussardi outfitted the Italian athletes competing in the 1988 Olympic Games in Seoul, South Korea. Then in 1989, Trussardi used his collection to protest both the deforestation of the world's rainforests, and the use of real animal fur by his contemporaries. He used exclusively faux-fur, and included letters of protest against deforestation in the entrance bags given to the attendees of that year's fashion shows. Throughout his career, Trussardi spent time promoting the marketing phrase "Made in Italy" and Italian fashion in general. By the time of Trussardi's death in 1999, his business was worth about $480 million. He was also a costume designer for play productions staged in both Europe and the United States.

Trussardi also designed costumes for the stage, including a November 1985 production at Teatro Valle, Rome, of “Bestia da Stile” by Pier Paolo Pasolini, a September 1986 production at Verona Arena, Verona, of “Macbeth” by Giuseppe Verdi, and a September 1987 International Ballet Gala at the Piazza dei Miracoli, Pisa.

== Marino alla Scala ==
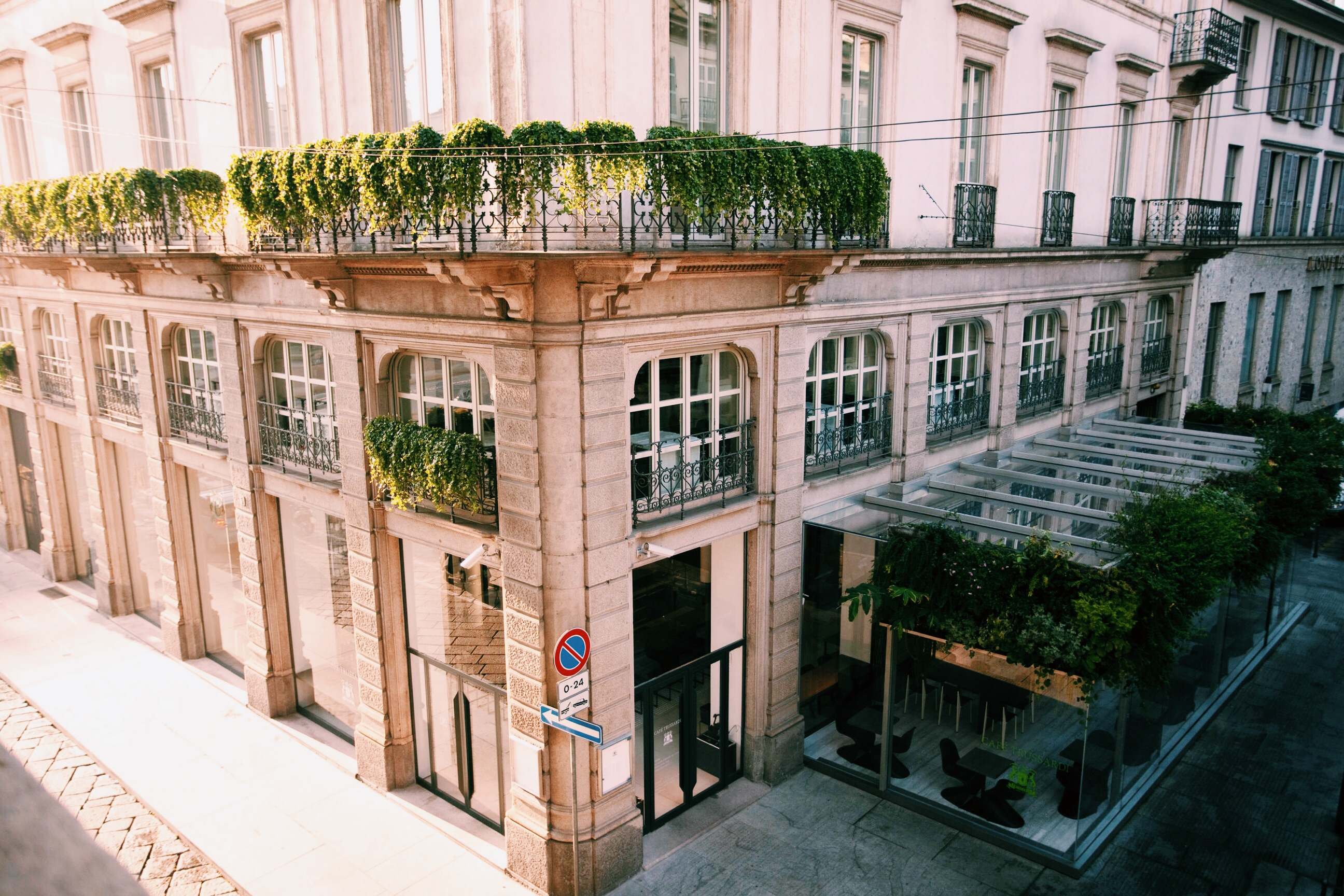
Marino alla Scala in Milan.

In 1996 Trussardi restored the Marino alla Scala, located beside the La Scala opera house in Milan, which now contains several different establishments, including a Trussardi boutique and showroom. He originally purchased the building in 1989, and spent about $67 million over seven years to have the complex completed. During the construction, the municipal government attempted to extort money from Trussardi through major fines and slow bureaucratic responses. The property was originally built in 1876, and was restored by Dutch artists Ben Van Os and Rainer Van Brummelen in the neo-mannerist style. The first exhibition to be held in the gallery was a series of 105 sketches by Pablo Picasso.

== Initiatives ==
Trussardi has undertaken many other initiatives, including the creation of the Palatrussardi in Milan, which has hosted a number of pop and rock concerts, including that of Frank Sinatra, Liza Minnelli, and Sammy Davis Jr. Other projects included a specially fitted-out Mini, produced by Innocenti. The Nicola Trussardi Foundation is a non-profit institution for the promotion of contemporary art and culture under the direction of president Beatrice Trussardi. Since 2003 the Foundation has decided to concentrate its resources on the realization of contemporary art events in the public spaces of the city of Milano. In 2009 the foundation sponsored an art exhibition at the Venice Biennale curated by Daniel Birnbaum, featuring a sound installation by Roberto Cuoghi. It celebrated its tenth anniversary at the Venice Biennale as well in 2013.

Trussardi himself also advocated for an area of Milan to be demarcated the "Citta della Moda", where all Milanese designers would have boutiques and which would house all future fashion shows for the city's fashion companies and labels. The project was abandoned after Trussardi's death, and several Milanese designers have since constructed their own private showcase spaces.

== Personal life ==
Trussardi was a supporter of the arts in Milan, and a collector of fine sculpture. Trussardi owned a villa on the island of Elba, where he frequently entertained. Trussardi had four children, two daughters and two sons with his wife Marialuisa, who worked alongside Nicola his whole professional life as the company's creative director. His hobbies included racing speed boats and flying his Citation II aircraft as a licensed amateur pilot.

Trussardi was killed when he lost control of his Mercedes-Benz on Tangenziale Est of Milan and hit a lamp post in the early hours of 13 April 1999. He died the following day in Milan.

== Filmography ==
Costume designer (partial)

- Demons: The Nightmare Is Back (1986)

Actor

- Prêt-à-Porter (1994)
