= Hugo Boss Prize =

The Hugo Boss Prize
- Awarded for: Outstanding achievement in contemporary art
- Sponsored by: Hugo Boss
- Country: United States
- Presented by: Solomon R. Guggenheim Foundation
- First award: 1996
- Final award: 2020
- Website: www.guggenheim.org/hugo-boss-prize

The Hugo Boss Prize was an award given every other year to an artist (or group of artists) working in any medium, anywhere in the world. Upon its establishment in 1996, it distinguished itself from other art awards because it has no restrictions on nationality or age. The prize was administered by the Solomon R. Guggenheim Foundation and sponsored by the Hugo Boss clothing company, which since 1995 has been sponsoring various exhibitions and activities at the Solomon R. Guggenheim Museum. It included a cash award of US$100,000 and a tetrahedral trophy.

A jury of five to six curators, critics, and scholars was responsible for the selection of the artists. They nominated six or seven artists for the shortlist; several months later, they chose the winner of the prize. In the prize's early years, most nominated artists were little known. In 1996 and 1998, the nominated artists exhibited their work at the now-defunct Guggenheim Soho, where a space on the second floor was named the Hugo Boss Gallery in 1996; since 2000, only the winning artist has shown his or her work. The Guggenheim Foundation discontinued the prize in 2022.

== History of the Prize ==
1996 The first Hugo Boss Prize was awarded to Matthew Barney, an American filmmaker and sculptor. The other nominees were:

- Laurie Anderson (United States)
- Janine Antoni (United States)
- Cai Guo-Qiang (PRC)
- Stan Douglas (Canada)
- Yasumasa Morimura (Japan)

1998 Douglas Gordon, a Scottish video artist, won the second Hugo Boss prize. The other nominees were:

- Huang Yong Ping (PRC/France)
- William Kentridge (South Africa)
- Lee Bul (South Korea)
- Pipilotti Rist (Switzerland)
- Lorna Simpson (United States)

2000 The third Hugo Boss Prize went to Marjetica Potrč, a Slovenian artist, architect and urban theorist working in sculpture and photography. The other nominees were:

- Vito Acconci (United States)
- Maurizio Cattelan (Italy)
- Michael Elmgreen and Ingar Dragset (Denmark and Norway)
- Tom Friedman (United States)
- Barry Le Va (United States)
- Tunga (Brazil)

2002 Pierre Huyghe, a French artist who works in multiple media, won the fourth Hugo Boss Prize. The other nominees were:

- Francis Alÿs (Mexico)
- Ólafur Elíasson (Denmark)
- Hachiya Kazuhiko (Japan)
- Koo Jeong-A (South Korea)
- Anri Sala (Albania)

2004 The fifth Hugo Boss Prize was awarded to Rirkrit Tiravanija, a Thai artist born in Buenos Aires who now works in New York, Berlin and Bangkok. The other nominees were:

- Franz Ackermann (Germany)
- Rivane Neuenschwander (Brazil)
- Jeroen de Rijke and Willem de Rooij (The Netherlands)
- Simon Starling (United Kingdom)
- Yang Fudong (China)

2006 The sixth Hugo Boss Prize was awarded to the British artist Tacita Dean. The other nominees were:

- Jennifer Allora and Guillermo Calzadilla (US and Puerto Rico)
- John Bock (Germany)
- Damián Ortega (Mexico)
- Aïda Ruilova (US)
- Tino Sehgal (Germany)

2008

The seventh Hugo Boss Prize was awarded to Palestinian Emily Jacir. The other nominees were:

- Christoph Büchel (Iceland)
- Patty Chang (United States)
- Sam Durant (United States)
- Joachim Koester (Denmark)
- Roman Signer (Switzerland)

2010

The eighth Hugo Boss Prize was awarded to the German artist Hans-Peter Feldmann who chose to pin the prize money to the walls of the Guggenheim. The other nominees were:

- Cao Fei (PRC)
- Roman Ondák (Slovakia)
- Walid Raad (Lebanon/United States)
- Natascha Sadr Haghighian (Iraq/Germany)
- Apichatpong Weerasethakul (Thailand)

2012

The ninth Hugo Boss Prize was awarded to the Vietnamese artist Danh Vo. The other nominees were:

- Trisha Donnelly (United States)
- Rashid Johnson (United States)
- Qiu Zhijie (PRC)
- Monika Sosnowska (Poland)
- Tris Vonna-Michell (Great Britain)

2014

The tenth Hugo Boss Prize was awarded to the American artist Paul Chan. Other nominated artists were:

- Sheela Gowda (India)
- Camille Henrot (France)
- Hassan Khan (Egypt)
- Steve McQueen (Great Britain)
- Charline von Heyl (Germany)

In March 2014, nominee Steve McQueen withdrew his name from consideration for the Hugo Boss Prize because of the demands of promoting his Oscar-winning movie 12 Years A Slave.

2016

The eleventh Hugo Boss prize was awarded to the South Korean conceptual artist Anicka Yi. The other nominees were:

- Tania Bruguera (Cuba)
- Mark Leckey (Great Britain)
- Ralph Lemon (United States)
- Laura Owens (United States)
- Wael Shawky (Egypt)

2018

The twelfth Hugo Boss Prize was awarded to Simone Leigh, an American interdisciplinary multimedia artist. The other nominees were:

- Bouchra Khalili (Morocco)
- Teresa Margolles (Mexico)
- Emeka Ogboh (Nigeria)
- Frances Stark (United States)
- Wu Tsang (United States)

2020

The thirteenth Hugo Boss Prize was awarded to Deana Lawson, an American photographer. The other nominees were:

- Nairy Baghramian (Iran)
- Kevin Beasley (United States)
- Elias Sime (Ethiopia)
- Cecilia Vicuña (Chile)
- Adrián Villar Rojas (Argentina)
