= Tarik Samarah =

Bosnian photographer (born 1965)

Tarik Samarah is a Bosnian photographer who works in artistic and documentary photography. Samarah was born in 1965 in Zagreb to Bosnian and Sudanese parents. He spent years compiling the project "Srebrenica - genocide at the heart of Europe". He has widely exhibited his works most notably at the Holocaust Museum in Washington DC and United Nations building in New York. He is also renowned for his billboard campaign in Republic of Serbia. The campaign exhibited the images of Srebrenica massacre on large commercial billboards in the cities across Serbia as a method of raising awareness about event that took place during the Srebrenica Genocide.

== Biography ==
Tarik Samarah (photographer and founder of the Memorial Gallery 11/07/95) was born in Zagreb, spent his childhood in Ljubuski and for the last thirty years he lives and works in Sarajevo. His interests mainly reside in the field of artistic and documentary photography, and his most significant professional success is deemed to be the Srebrenica – genocide in the heart of Europe project – a series of black-and-white photographs documenting the aftermath of Srebrenica genocide.

His photographs have been exhibited in many renowned art galleries, museums and public places in the world, both independently and in collective exhibitions such as: U.S. Holocaust Museum in Washington D.C, UN Headquarters – New York, Galerie du jour – Paris, Dutch Parliament in the Hague, Memorial Center Westerbork, Pordenone Arte Contemporanea – Italy, travelling exhibition of Anne Frank Museum – Rabat, Cape Town, Illinois Holocaust Museum & Education Center, Skokie – Chicago, Norwegian Center for the Study of the Holocaust & Religious Minorities – Oslo, The Plaine de Plainpalais – Geneva, Westminster Abbey – London and many others.

Samarah is author of two publications of his photographs; the second one – monography “Srebrenica” had been published in two editions in Bosnian-English and Catalan-English languages. Samarah’s photographs also went around the world on the covers of various scientific and research books and publications. Samarah is the awarded author. Award of the International Peace Center “Freedom”, GRAND-PRIX Award for the Applied Art for 2005, Award of the Book Fair Ljubljana are some of the recognitions that he has received for his work and dedication.

Today, his photographs form the permanent exhibit in Memorial Gallery 11/07/95 located in Sarajevo, a gallery that represents the final goal and summation of Samarah’s work on the topic.

== Exhibitions ==
- „11 July“, Memorial Center Potočari (2003)
- „Srebrenica“, Parliament Kingdom of the Netherlands (2005)
- „Abondened in Srebrenica: 10 years later“, Holocaust Museum Washington (2005)
- "Ten Years Later: commemorative art, exhibitions, art installations, screening of the movies and presentation", UN headquarters New York (2005)
- “8372 didn't arrived”, Museum Mimara, Zagreb (2006)
- “My Enemies: Nationalism and Xhenophobia”, Vivisect fest, Novi Sad (2006)
- „Srebrenica", Memorial Center Camp Westerbork, Holandija (2007)
- „Our Story“, Galerie du jour, Paris (2009)
- „Srebrenica“, War Photo Limited, Dubrovnik (2012)
- “Aftermath Project – Changing Cultural Landscape – Tendencies of engaged post-Yugoslav contemporary photography” (joined exhibition) (PARCO Pordenone Arte Contemporanea - Italy, Spazi Espositivi via Bertossi), Pordenone, Italy, Gallery Klovićevi dvori, Zagreb, Hrvatska; Kulturni centar Beograda- Podroom and Gallery Remont, Republic of Srbija, Belgrade (2013)
