= Tacita Dean =

British artist (born 1965)

Tacita Dean CBE, RA
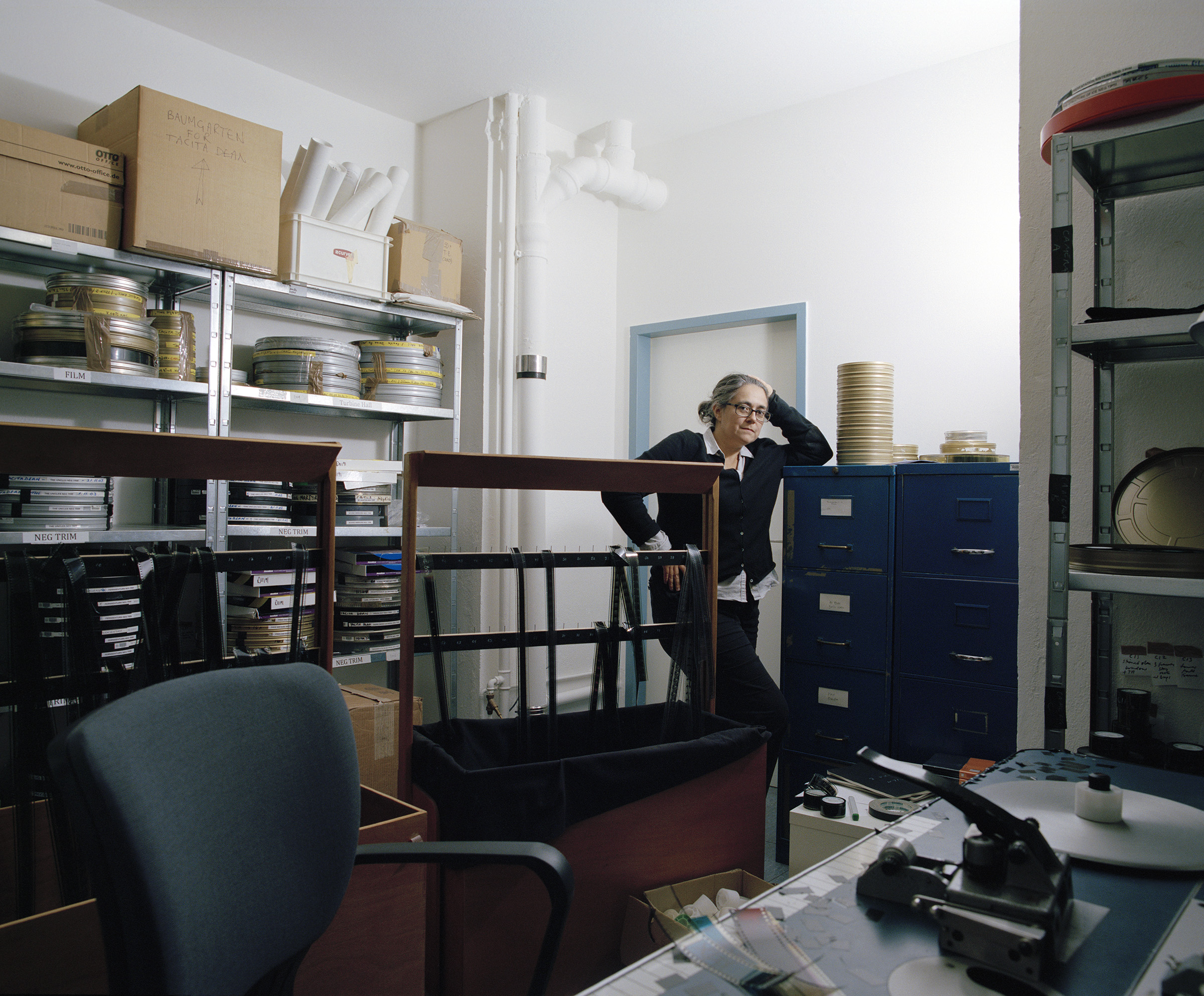
- Tacita Dean photographed by Oliver Mark, Berlin 2012
- Born: Tacita Charlotte Dean; 1965 (age 60–61); Canterbury, Kent, England
- Education: Falmouth University; Slade School of Fine Art
- Known for: Conceptual art, installation art

Tacita Charlotte Dean CBE, RA (born 1965) is a British visual artist who works primarily in film. She was a nominee for the Turner Prize in 1998, won the Hugo Boss Prize in 2006, and was elected to the Royal Academy of Arts in 2008. She lives and works in Berlin, Germany, and Los Angeles, California.

== Early life and education ==
Dean was born in Canterbury, Kent. Her mother is named Jenefer and her father was Joseph Dean, a lawyer who studied classics at Merton College, Oxford. She has a sister named Antigone and a brother, the architect Ptolemy Dean. Her grandfather was Basil Dean, the founder of Ealing Studios.

Dean was educated at Kent College, Canterbury. After a foundation year in Canterbury, she studied at Falmouth University, graduating in 1988. From 1990 to 1992, Dean studied for a master's degree at the Slade School of Fine Art.

== Career ==
In 1995, Dean was included in General Release: Young British Artists held at the XLVI Venice Biennale. She is one of the "key names", along with Jake and Dinos Chapman, Gary Hume, Sam Taylor-Wood, Fiona Banner and Douglas Gordon, of the Young British Artists (YBAs). Her work actually had little in common with the prominent YBAs, Damien Hirst and Tracey Emin.

In 1997, Dean moved to London. That same year she began to exhibit splices of magnetic tape cut the length required to document the duration of the sound indicated, such as a raven's cry. In 2001 she was given a solo show entitled Tacita Dean: Recent films and Other Works at Tate Britain. For the season 2004/2005 in the Vienna State Opera Dean designed the large scale picture (176 sqm) "Play as Cast" as part of the exhibition series Safety Curtain, conceived by museum in progress.

In 2000, Dean relocated to Berlin, where she has since been living in the city's Charlottenburg district and maintaining a studio in Westend. She was an artist in residence at the Getty Research Institute in 2014 and at the Menil Collection in 2024.

Dean is a founding member of savefilm.org and campaigns to save the medium of film. Dean has also been instrumental in saving the archive and home of filmmaker Derek Jarman. She met Jarman by chance on a train and it changed her perspective working in film.

== Work ==
=== Film ===
Dean is best known for her work in 16 mm film, although she utilises a variety of media including drawing, photography and sound. Her films often employ long takes and steady camera angles to create a contemplative atmosphere. She has also published several pieces of her own writing, which she refers to as 'asides,' which complement her visual work. Since the mid-1990s her films have not included commentary, but are instead accompanied by often understated optical sound tracks.

The sea was a persistent theme in Dean's work, especially during the 1990s. During that decade, she explored the maritime misadventures of Donald Crowhurst, an amateur English sailor whose ambition to enter a race to solo circumnavigate the globe ended in deception, existential crisis and, eventually, tragedy. Dean has made a number of films and blackboard drawings relating to the Crowhurst story, exploiting the metaphorical richness of such motifs as the ocean, lighthouses and shipwrecks. Re-turning to her attraction with the sea, Amadeus (swell consopio) was made for the Folkestone Triennial (three-year art show) in 2008.

In 1997, Dean made an audio work based on her futile effort to find the submerged artwork Spiral Jetty by Robert Smithson in the Great Salt Lake of Utah.

Sound Mirrors (1999) takes its name from the tracking devices built during the 1920s and 1930s and planted in the Kent countryside to detect incoming German aircraft.

In 2000, Dean was awarded a one-year German Academic Exchange Service (DAAD) scholarship to Berlin, where she moved that year with her partner, artist Mathew Hale. She devoted attention to the architecture and cultural history of Germany, making films of such iconic structure as the Palast der Republik. Fernsehturm, is a 44-minute film set in the revolving cafe of the East Berlin television tower, completed in 1969 on Alexanderplatz. Other projects have concerned important figures in post-war German cultural history, such as W. G. Sebald and Joseph Beuys.

Recent films are about artists and thinkers of the last fifty years and feature Mario Merz, Merce Cunningham, Leo Steinberg, Julie Mehretu, Claes Oldenburg, and Cy Twombly. For example, Craneway Event (2008) is a film about Cunningham working on something with his dancers over three afternoons on site.

In 2006, Dean shot Kodak, a movie in a Kodak factory in eastern France – the last one in Europe to produce 16-mm film stock. A few weeks after she visited, it closed for good.

In 2013, Dean exhibited JG, a 26-minute 35 mm film in colour and black and white at the Frith Street Gallery in London. The film returns to Dean's fascination with the famous land artwork Spiral Jetty by Robert Smithson and her friendship with the science-fiction writer J. G. Ballard. During the film, the viewer also hears excerpts from the writings and correspondence of Ballard as well as of Smithson, all read by actor Jim Broadbent.

=== Photography and painting ===
In 2001 Dean published Floh ("flea" in German), a book in two parts that used found photographs from the flea markets of Europe and America. Dean said of Floh: "I do not want to give these images explanations: descriptions by the finder about how and where they were found, or guesses as to what stories they might or might not tell. I want them to keep the silence of the fleamarket; the silence they had when I found them; the silence of the lost object." Similarly, in 2002 Dean created Czech Photos (1991–2002), a series of over 326 unedited photographs presented in a box for intimate engagement. The black and white photographs show a city in the moments before radical change, already somehow out of date the second they were taken. Washington Cathedral (2002) is a series of more than 130 found postcards from the first half of the last century showing various imagined versions of the cathedral in Washington, D.C. before it was completed. Palindrome is a newspaper project celebrating the palindromic date 20.02 2002, which was inspired by numbers painted by Marcel Broodthaers on a beam in his studio. In 2005, Dean began work on a series of found postcards of trees, which she transformed by painting out all the background detail with white gouache.

=== Work on Cy Twombly ===
In 2007, Dean met Cy Twombly briefly in Rome, and she eventually gave lectures, contributed to the catalog of his 2008 Tate Modern exhibition, and wrote about his 1975 oil pastel and collage on paper, Pan. Her installation GAETA (fifty photographs plus one) was made in 2008 in Twombly's house and studio in the Italian town of Gaeta; the images were first published as a photo essay in the catalog for Twombly's 2009 exhibition at Mumok in Vienna. She made a short 2011 film about the artist, "Edwin Parker" (Twombly's given name). In 2021, her show "Sigh Sigh Sigh" in Rome featured a series of works relating to Twombly.

=== Commissions ===
Dean has undertaken commissions for London's former Millennium Dome, the Sadler's Wells Theatre, and for Cork, Ireland, as part of that city's European City of Culture celebrations. She has also completed residencies at the Sundance Institute, the Wexner Center for the Arts, Columbus, U.S., and the Deutscher Akademischer Austauschdienst, Berlin

In 2011, Dean was the 12th artist commissioned by the Unilever Series to create a unique artwork for the Turbine Hall of the Tate Modern. The result, FILM, was an 11-minute silent film shot on 35 mm film that was projected onto a 13-meter screen and sought "not only to invigorate debate about the threat film is under but also to stand as a testament to the distinctive qualities of this unique medium."

== Recognition ==
Following her 1996 film Disappearance at Sea, Dean was nominated for the Turner Prize in 1998. She has since been awarded the Aachen Art Prize (2002), Hugo Boss Prize (2006), and the Kurt Schwitters Prize (2009), among others. In 2011, Blake Gopnik listed Dean among "The 10 Most Important Artists of Today".

She was appointed Officer of the Order of the British Empire (OBE) in the 2013 New Year Honours for services to British art overseas.

Dean was the recipient of the 2019 TenTen artist commission, and the 2019 Cherry Kearton Medal and Award.

== Personal life ==
Dean is married to artist Matthew Hale. They have a son.

== Exhibitions ==
Tacita Dean: Blind Folly. October 11, 2024 through August 19, 2025. The Menil Collection, Houston, Texas

== Filmography ==
- The Story of Beard, 1992
- The Martyrdom of St Agatha (in several parts), 1994
- Girl Stowaway, 1994
- How to Put a Boat in a Bottle, 1995
- A Bag of Air, 1995
- Disappearance at Sea, 1996
- Delft Hydraulics, 1996
- Foley Artist, 1996
- Disappearance at Sea II, 1997
- The Structure of Ice, 1997
- Gellért, 1998
- Bubble House, 1999
- Sound Mirrors, 1999
- From Columbus, Ohio, to the Partially Buried Woodshed, 1999
- Banewl, 1999
- Teignmouth Electron, 2000
- Totality, 2000
- Fernsehturm, 2001
- The Green Ray, 2001
- Baobab, 2002
- Ztrata, 2002
- Section Cinema (Homage to Marcel Broodthaers), 2002
- Diamond Ring, 2002
- Mario Merz, 2002
- Boots, 2003
- Pie, 2003
- Palast, 2004
- The Uncles, 2004
- Presentation Sisters, 2005
- Kodak, 2006
- Noir et Blanc, 2006
- Human Treasure, 2006
- Michael Hamburger, 2007
- Darmstädter Werkblock, 2007
- Amadeus, 2008
- Merce Cunningham performs STILLNESS (in three movements) to John Cage's composition 4'33" with Trevor Carlson, New York City, 28 April 2007 (six performances; six films), 2008
- Prisoner Pair, 2008
- Still Life, 2009
- Day for Night, 2009
- Craneway Event, 2009
- Manhattan Mouse Museum, 2011
- FILM, 2011
- JG, 2013
- His Picture in Little, 2017
- Antigone, 2018
- Paradise, The Dante Project, 2021

== See also ==
- Ptolemy Dean
