= Paola Pivi =

Italian artist

- Born: 1971 (age 54–55); Milan, Italy
- Website: paolapivi.com

Paola Pivi (born 1971) is an Italian multimedia artist.

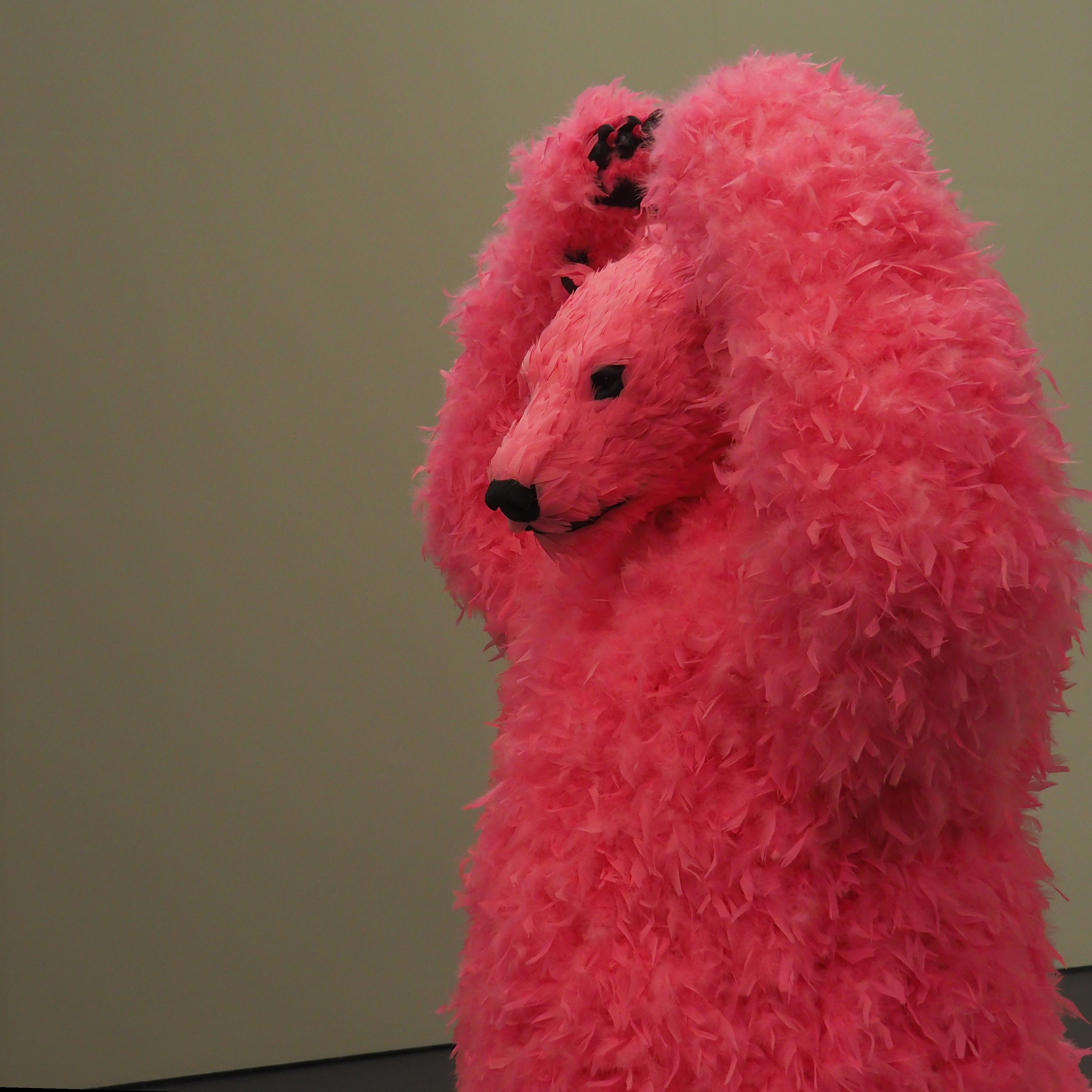
Paola Pivi’s feathered polar bear as part of the exhibition "We are animals" at Kunsthal in Rotterdam, 2021

== Works ==
She has worked in artistic media including photography, sculpture and installation. Some of her works contain performance elements, at times involving live animals and people. In 1999, she received the Golden Lion Award at the Venice Biennale. Examples of her work are in public collections including those of the Centre Pompidou in Paris and MAXXI in Rome.

In November 2025, Paola Pivi opened a major solo exhibition I don't like it, I love it at the Art Gallery of Western Australia (AGWA).
