= Anri Sala =

Albanian contemporary artist

- Anri Sala at MACBA Barcelona
- Born: Anri Sala; 1974 (age 51–52); Tirana, Albania

Anri Sala (born 1974) is an Albanian contemporary artist whose primary medium is video.

== Life and career ==
Sala studied art at the Albanian Academy of Arts from 1992 to 1996. He also studied video at the Ecole Nationale des Arts Décoratifs, Paris and film direction in Le Fresnoy-Studio National des Arts Contemporains, Tourcoing. He lives and works in Paris.

Sala's video installation Dammi i colori ("Give me the colors") was on display at Tate Modern in London. The installation reflects on the transformation of Tirana in 2003 by means of colors. The installation includes a conversation with Tirana's mayor, Edi Rama, a personal friend of the artist's and the force behind this transformation. Sala will participate in ROUNDTABLE: The 9th Gwangju Biennale (2012).

Answer Me (2008) was filmed in a Buckminster Fuller-inspired geodesic dome in Berlin, a former NSA surveillance tower, which was constructed on the Teufelsberg (Devil's Mountain).

He represented France at the Venice Biennale in 2013.

Sala presented Le Clash (2010), Tlatelolco Clash (2011) and Doldrum (2014) as a mixed installation in Gemeentemuseum Den Haag, and in November 2014 he won the Vincent Award.

He is in a relationship with Rosario, Princess of Preslav.

== Short films ==
1999

- Quelle histoire? (Mirage Illimité), Paris
- Nocturnes (Le Fresnoy), Tourcoing. Selected at the Rencontres cinématographiques, Tourcoing (1999); selected at the Short Film Festival, Clermont Ferrand (2000)

1998

- Intervista - finding the words (Ideale Audience, ENSAD), Paris. Best Film Award, Estavar Video Festival, Estavar. Best Documentary Film Award, Entrevues Festival, Belfort. Best Short Film Award, Amascultura Festival, Portugal. Best Documentary Film Award, International Documentary Film Festival, Santiago de Compostela, Spain (1999). Best Documentary Film Award, Filmfest 2000, Tirana

== Recognition and awards ==
- Vincent Award (2014)
- Absolut Art Award (2011)
- Young Artist Prize at the 49th Venice Biennale (2001)
- Prix Gilles Dusein, Paris (2000)
- Best Documentary Film Award from the Filmfest in Tirana (2000)
- International Film Festival in Santiago de Compostela (1999).
- Hugo Boss Prize (2002)

== Public collections ==
Anri Sala's work is included in public collections such as Art Institute of Chicago, Chicago, USA; Centre Pompidou, Paris, France; Dallas Museum of Art, Dallas, USA; LACMA, Los Angeles, USA; Museo de Arte Contemporáneo de Barcelona, Spain; MoMA, New York, USA; Pinault Collection, Paris, France; Tate, London, UK; Walker Art Center, Minneapolis, USA; among others.

== Essential bibliography ==
- Mark Godfrey, "1000 words: Anri Sala", Artforum, New York, April (2015)
- Christine Macel, "Anri Sala - Ravel Ravel Unravel", Venice Biennale (2013)
- Christopher Mooney, "Anri Sala", Art Review, London, Summer (2013)
- Michael Fried, Joshua Simon, "Anri Sala", Serpentine Gallery, London (2011)
- Hans Ulrich Obrist, Mark Godfrey, Liam Gillick, "Anri Sala", Phaidon, London (2006)
- Lynne Cooke, Mark Godfrey, Jan Verwoert, "Anri Sala", Parkett, Zurich (2005)
- Massimiliano Gioni, Michele Robecchi, "Anri Sala: Unfinished Histories", Flash Art, Milan, no. 219, July–September (2001)
- Laurence Bosse, Hans Ulrich Obrist, "Anri Sala: When the Night Calls", Musée d'Art Moderne de la Ville de Paris (1999)

== See also ==
- Albanian art
- Modern Albanian art
