= Tino Sehgal =

German/Indian artist (b.1976)

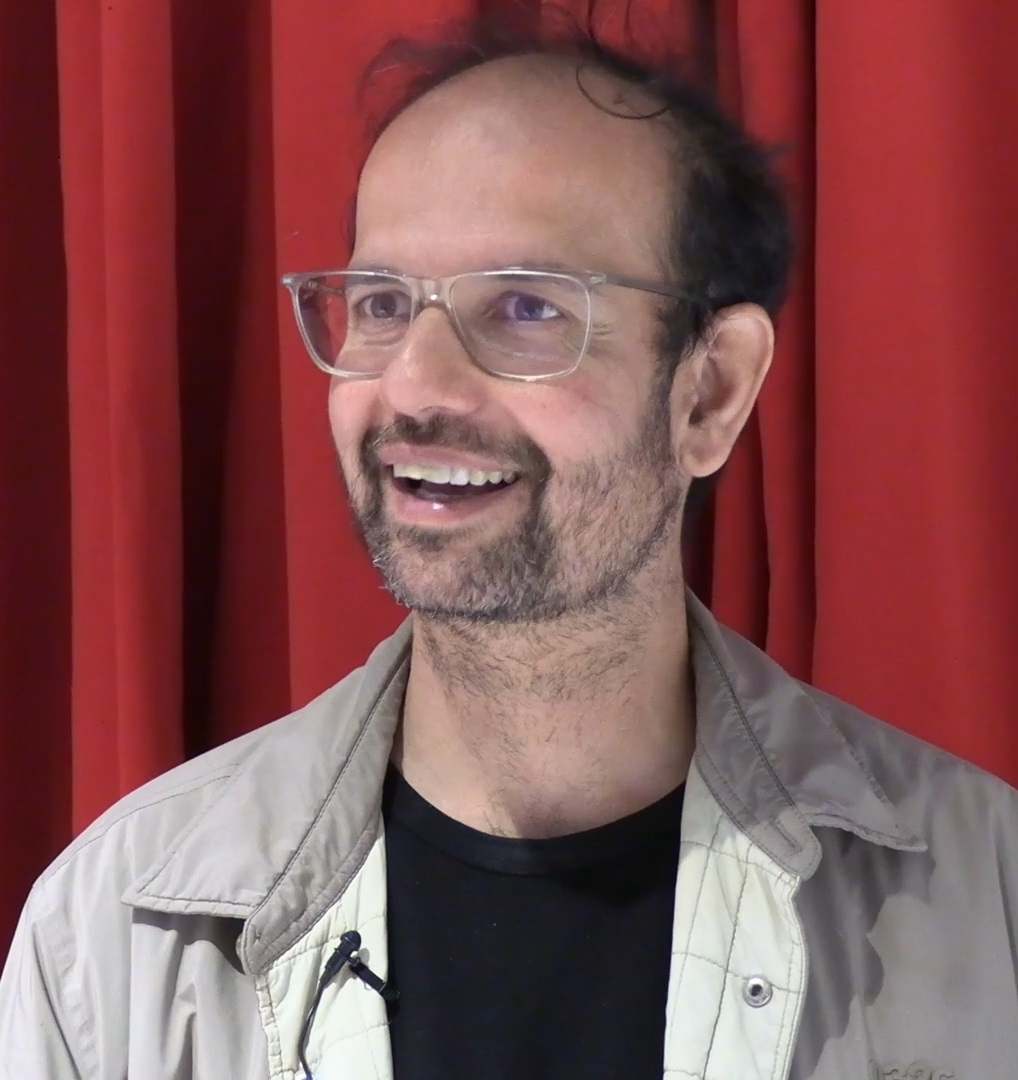
- Tino Sehgal: This Entry, Manchester International Festival 2023
- Born: 1976 (age 49–50); London, England
- Occupation: Artist

Tino Sehgal (/ˈsɛhɡəl/; German: [ˈzeːgaːl]; born 1976) is an artist of German and Indian descent, based in Berlin, who describes his work as "constructed situations". He is also thought of as a choreographer who makes dance for the museum setting.

== Personal life ==
Sehgal was born in London and raised in Düsseldorf, Paris, and a town close to Stuttgart. His father was born in British India, and was a member of the Punjabi Sehgal family, but "had to flee from what is today Pakistan when he was a child"; his mother was "a German native and homemaker."

He studied political economy and dance at Humboldt University, Berlin and Folkwang University of the Arts, Essen. He danced in the work of French experimental choreographers Jérôme Bel and Xavier Le Roy. In 1999, Sehgal worked with the dance collective Les Ballets C. de la B. in Ghent, Belgium, and developed a piece entitled Twenty Minutes for the Twentieth Century, a 55-minute series of movements performed naked in twenty different dance styles, from Vaslav Nijinsky to George Balanchine to Merce Cunningham, and so forth.

He lives in Berlin with his two sons.

== Career ==
The artist describes his works as 'constructed situations'. His materials are situations animated through references to art history and the participation of interpreters who use voice, reenactment, language, movement, dramaturgy and interaction to shape the experiences of visitors. He resists the production of physical objects in an extension of the logics of western conceptual art and as a part of his commitment to an ecological politics of production. Sehgal's pieces are regularly staged in museums or galleries, and continuously executed by trained individuals he refers to as “interpreters” for the entire duration of a show. The artwork is the constructed situation which arises between the audience and the interpreters of the piece.

=== Untitled (2000) ===
Untitled (2000) or also called Twenty Minutes for the Twentieth Century, is one of his earliest works. A solo for a naked male dancer, initially performed by Sehgal himself and later by Frank Willens, Andrew Hardwidge and Boris Charmatz. In the piece fragments of 20 dance styles are performed in a parkour through a history of 20th century western dance practice. The piece and its reception cemented Sehgal's interest in the exhibition framework by appropriating the idea of the historical retrospective in the context of the theatre.

=== This is good (2001) ===
For This is good (2001) a museum worker waves their arms and hops from one leg to the other, then states the title of the piece.

=== Kiss (2002) ===
First shown in France, Kiss was exhibited and acquired by Toronto's Art Gallery of Ontario, the first museum in North America to present the artist's work. The Museum of Contemporary Art, Chicago, was the first American museum to acquire Kiss. An edition of four, the Museum of Modern Art, New York, acquired the final edition of Kiss. Best considered a sculptural work, Kiss is constituted by two dancers who move together slowly through a series of postures reenacting images of kisses from classic works of art history; the work appropriates the different amorous poses in Auguste Rodin's The Kiss (1889), Constantin Brâncuși's The Kiss (1908), Gustav Klimt's The Kiss (1907–08), Jeff Koons and La Cicciolina's Made in Heaven (1990–91) and various Gustave Courbet paintings from the 1860s, one after the other.

=== This objective of that object (2004) ===
For This objective of that object (2004), the visitor is confronted by five people who remain with their backs to the visitors. The five chant, "The objective of this work is to become the object of a discussion," and if the visitor does not respond, they slowly sink to the ground. If the visitor says something, they begin a discussion.

=== This is So Contemporary (2005) ===
In this work, performers dance in a happy, emphatic way around visitors entering the exhibition space, singing, "Oh, this is so contemporary, contemporary, contemporary. Oh, this is so contemporary, contemporary, contemporary." The melody and style of dance left some of the museum visitors cheerful and dancing, themselves.

=== This occupation (2005) ===
In this work, two performers roam a gallery space, seeming to be members of the public. At random intervals, the performers will individually approach a visitor and make a prolonged, indiscernible vocalization whilst engaging in continuous, direct eye contact with them. If their chosen visitor attempts to avoid them, the performer will follow them for the duration of their vocalization, attempting to maintain eye contact. At the end of the vocalization, the performer states the name, date and artist of the work and resumes their 'unassuming' role as a member of the public. If the performer's targeted visitor engages in conversation with them, the performer will discuss their life, revealing that they have previously experienced homelessness.

The work is described as one that "bears witness to today’s hard times and sketches an empathic portrait of a fragile human being" and "a story of malaise, a different look at our economic system and the world of work, in which a person describes his life on the fringes of society: a piece about how time is employed and transformed".

The work was installed for a period of time in 2024 at MONA in Hobart, Tasmania, Australia.

=== This you (2006) ===
In 2018, the Hirshhorn Museum acquired This You (2006), a piece of performance art featuring a solo female singer performing outdoors, the performers themselves choose songs based on the mood they perceive the visitor to be in.

=== This situation (2007) ===
For This situation (2007), Sehgal engaged the participation of a group of intellectuals. They occupied an otherwise empty gallery space and interacted with each other and the audience through discussions of a set of memorised quotes while moving in slow motion between different positions and postures from art history in a games-like form established by the artist.

=== This Success/This Failure (2007) ===
In This Success/This Failure (2007) young children attempt to play without using objects and sometimes draw visitors into their games.

=== This progress (2010) ===
Exhibited at the Guggenheim Museum, New York, the artist empties Frank Lloyd Wright's famed spiral gallery of all art work. The museum visitor is met at the base of the spiral by a child, who asks a small group what they think progress is. As they begin their ascent up the spiral ramp the visitors continue their conversation until they are met by a high school student who picks up the conversation and asks further non-sequitur questions. Further still, they are met by a young adult and lastly an older adult who finishes their ascent to the upper-most point in the Guggenheim.

=== This variation (2012) ===
For documenta XIII (2012) Sehgal orchestrated This variation, an immersive piece, developed with a group of dancers and the composer Ari Benjamin Meyers. The work places viewers in a nearly dark gallery among the performers who dance and sing a cappella arrangements and improvisations of electronic music, using a score created by Sehgal to create an evolving dramaturgy and "an electrifying aural-spatial experience of pure, unencumbered imagination in action".

=== These associations (2012) ===
In 2012, Sehgal was the 13th artist commissioned by the Tate Modern for its annual Unilever series. The first “live” work in the vast space, These associations consists solely of encounters between around 70 storytellers and visitors to the gallery.

=== ¥ with Tino Seghal (2021) ===
Tino Seghal and Ye published a conversation with mention of a planned art piece called "The Funeral Rehearsal of Kanye West".

== Exhibitions ==
Sehgal is the youngest artist to have represented Germany at the Venice Biennale (in 2005, together with Thomas Scheibitz). Sehgal had solo exhibitions at a number of important venues including Centro Botín, Santander, Spain (2023 - 2024); Auckland Art Gallery, Auckland, New Zealand (2022); the Stedelijk Museum, Amsterdam (2015); Museum für Moderne Kunst, Frankfurt (2007); the Institute of Contemporary Arts, London (2007, 2006, 2005); Kunsthaus Bregenz, Austria (2006), Kunstverein Hamburg (2006), Serralves Foundation, Porto (2005); Van Abbemuseum, Eindhoven and Musée des Beaux-Arts, Nantes (2004).

Sehgal refuses to publish catalogues for his exhibitions.

== Collections ==
On the sale of his work, Sehgal stipulates that there is no written set of instructions, no written receipt, no catalogue, no pictures and no perceivable meaning. The conversation that constitutes a Tino Sehgal sale consists of his talking to the buyer (usually a representative from a museum) before a notary and witnesses, generally with about five legal stipulations of the purchase: that the work be installed only by someone whom Sehgal himself has authorized via training and prior collaboration; that the people enacting the piece be paid an agreed-upon minimum; that the work be shown over a minimum period of six weeks (in order to avoid allegations of ephemerality); that the piece not be photographed; and that if the buyer resells the concept, he does so with this same oral contract. As of 2010, the "constructed situations" sold in editions of four to six (with Sehgal retaining an additional “artist’s proof”) at prices between $85,000 and $145,000 apiece.

Sehgal's This Progress (2010) was the first live work to be acquired by the Solomon R. Guggenheim Museum.

== Awards ==
- 2004 – Bâloise Prize, Art Basel
- 2006 – Shortlisted, Hugo Boss Prize
- 2007 – Shortlisted, Preis der Nationalgalerie für Junge Kunst
- 2009 – Zurich Art Prize
- 2013 – Finalist, Turner Prize (for his “This Variation” and “These Associations” exhibitions)
- 2013 – Golden Lion for the best artist in the International Exhibition Il Palazzo Enciclopedico (The Encyclopedic Palace) in Venice Biennale 2013 (Central Pavilion, Giardini)

== See also ==
- Debord, Guy (1957). Report on the Construction of Situations.
