= Kunsthall Trondheim =

Norwegian art gallery

- Established: 2013
- Location: Kongens gate 2, 7011 Trondheim, Norway
- Coordinates: 63.4304°N 10.4003°E
- Type: Kunsthalle
- Director: Adam Kleinman
- Website: www.kunsthalltrondheim.no

Kunsthall Trondheim (KT) is a contemporary art institution in Trondheim, Norway. Located in a former firehall, KT opened in October 2016. Between 2013 and 2016, the Kunsthall was run as a preliminary project in a temporary space by former Director Helena Holmberg. Stefanie Hessler was Director from 2019 until 2022; Adam Kleinman has been the Director since 2023. The facility offers exhibitions and public programs.

== Exhibitions ==
=== 2013 ===
- Straight Line (Stevens-Duke) Tomislav Gotovac
- Redwood, Hemvist og Kraftverk; Italics og Inverse Night Sky Lotta Lotass, Peter Thörneby
- Self Fashion Show Tibor Hajas
- Music While We Work Hong-Kai Wang
- The Broken Orchestra Live in Trondheim Hong-Kai Wang
- N.P. 1977 Neša Paripović

=== 2014 ===
- Freedom of Expression Dan Perjovschi
- Present Stability Silje Figenschou Thoresen
- Vannskille – Watershed, Divide Simen Engen Larsen
- Silphium Lina Selander
- On the Edge, Breaking Into Business Alex Villar
- Library of The Evil Spirit Ulla West

=== 2015 ===
- Meshes of the Afternoon Meriç Algün Ringborg, Maya Deren, Marianne Heske, Alevtina Kakhidsze, Lada Nakonechna, Karianne Stensland – a satellite venue of Kyiv Biennale 2015: The School of Kyiv.
- Objects That Don't Fit Together, Words That Suddenly Change Meaning Wenche Gulbransen
- Summer Thoughts Sven Augustijnen
- The Music Box Jonas Dahlberg

=== 2016 ===
- this is a political (painting) A K Dolven, Alexandra Pirici, Claire Fontaine, Kajsa Dahlberg, VALIE EXPORT

=== 2017 ===
- Notes From Underground Lisa Tan
- A New We Amanda Ackerman & Dan Richert, Arendse Krabbe, Asbjørn Skou, FRAUD (Fran Gallardo & Audrey Samson), Honey Biba Beckerlee, Karin Bolender, Kathy High, Oskar Jakobsen, Rachel Mayeri, Rosemary Lee, Ursula Biemann, a rawlings
- noe beveger seg sakte i en annen retning Carola Grahn, Iver Jåks, Ragna Misvær Grønstad, Silje Figenschou Thoresen, Sissel M. Bergh, niilas helander
- On Coexistence Marjetica Potrč
- A Series of Gestures Aimée Zito Lema
- Andrei's Maria Ingela Johansson
- Continents and I am Naked Nástio Mosquito

=== 2018 ===
- Strømmer av følelser, kropper av malm Anja Örn, Bodil Furu, David Blandy, Eline McGeorge, Fanny Carinasdotter, Hanna Ljungh, Ignas Krunglevičius, Joshua Portway, Karianne Stensland, Lawrence Lek, Lise Autogena, Liv Bugge, Louis Henderson, Marianne Heier, Rikke Luther, Sean Dockray, Tomas Örn
- What Fades in the Sun Lotte Konow Lund
- The Reading Adelita Husni-Bey – originally presented at the Italian Pavilion, 57th Venice Biennale.
- Works on Books Ane Mette Hol, Aron Kullander-Östling, Daniel Eatock, Esther Maria Bjørneboe, Fraser Muggeridge, Hans Petter Blad, John Morgan, Jonathan Monk, Kim Hiorthøy, Lenka Clayton, Michael Dumontier, Michael Marriott, Miriam Myrstad, Monica Aasprong, OK-RM, Åbäke
- Spirit Labour Adrian Heathfield, Hugo Glendinning
- Local Land Oddvar I.N. Darén
- Furniture Isn't Just Furniture & Freedom Requires Free People Ane Hjort Guttu

=== 2019 ===
- A beast, a god, and a line Ampannee Satoh, Anand Patwardhan, Anida Yoeu Ali, Apichatpong Weerasethakul, Celestine Fadul, Chai Siris, Chandrakanth Chitara, Charles Lim, Christy Chow, Cian Dayrit, Daniel Boyd, Dilara Begum Jolly, Etan Pavavalung, Garima Gupta, Gauri Gill, Huang Rui, Ines Doujak, Jaffa Lam, Jakrawal Nilthamrong, Jimmy Ong, Jiun-Yang Li, Joydeb Roaja, Jrai Dew Collective, Jöel Andrianomearisoa, Lantian Xie, Lavanya Mani, Malala Andrialavidrazana, Manish Nai, Ming Wong, Moelyono, Nabil Ahmed, Nguyen Trinh Thi, Nontawat Numbenchapol, Norberto Roldan, Paul Pfeiffer, Raja Umbu, Rajesh Vangad, Rashid Choudhury, Sarah Naqvi, Sarat Mala Chakma, Sawangwongse Yawnghwe, Sheela Gowda, Sheelasha Rajbhandari, Simon Soon, Simryn Gill, Su Yu Hsien, Taloi Havini, Than Sok, Thao Nguyen Phan, Trevor Yeung, Trương Công Tùng, Tuguldur Yondonjamts, Zamthingla Ruivah – curated by Cosmin Costinaș, and organised by Para Site, Hong Kong; Dhaka Art Summit, Dhaka; and the Museum of Modern Art, Warsaw.
- Wonderland Pia Arke, curated by Katrine Elise Pedersen.
- CONFERENCE Anna Daniel
- Partiturutstilling Mats Gustavsson
- mind moves with matter, body blends into space Ann Iren Buan, Brit Dyrnes, Francesca Woodman, Thora Dolven Balke, Tibor Hajas, Éva Mag
- Sowing Somankidi Coura. A Generative Archive Bouba Touré, Kaddu Yaraax, Raphaël Grisey, Sidney Sokhona, curated by Carl Martin Faurby.
- Francine (was a machine) Marte Aas

=== 2020 ===
- Into the World Dea Trier Mørch
- Who Wants to Live Forever? Oreet Ashery, Solveig Bergene, Gideonsson/Londré, Jessica Harvey, Moa Israelsson, Britta Marakatt-Labba, Mercedes Mühleisen, Adrian Piper, Tabita Rezaire, The Deep Field Project (Diann Bauer, Jol Thoms, Neal White), and Anton Vidokle
- NO NO NSE NSE Jenna Sutela
- Making of Earths Geocinema (Asia Bazdyrieva, Solveig Suess)

=== 2021 ===
- Songs for Dying Korakrit Arunanondchai
- Nets of Hyphae Diana Policarpo
- Distance Sverre Bjertnæs
- How did you feel when you come out of the wilderness Frida Orupabo
- Sex Ecologies, group exhibition

=== 2022 ===
- Unweaving the binary code – Hannah Ryggen Triennale, group exhibition
- Hidden Waves Christina Kubisch
- A threshold-game of proximity, cluster and heat Susanne M. Winterling
- Capture Metahaven
- Kunna Guanna Concha Carolina Caycedo, Elin Már Øyen Vister, Sissel M. Bergh

=== 2023 ===
- Panteha Abareshi INVALID PLEASURES
- Sissel Blystad Topography
- A Body of Memory (from neurons to the sea), group exhibition
- Attention After Technology, group exhibition

=== 2024 ===
- Tongues of Fire Anna-Kaisa Ant-Wuorinen, John Gerrard, Noémie Goudal, Lungiswa Gqunta, Agnieszka Kurant, Ana Mendieta, Tuda Muda, Tuan Andrew Nguyen, Gala Porras-Kim, The Atlas Group in collaboration with Walid Raad, Hannah Ryggen, Sin Wai Kin, and Thu Van Tran
- Emilija Škarnulytė The Goddess Helix
- Acid Rhythms, group exhibition
- Emilie Louise Gossiaux Kinship
- Teen Creators Vol. 1, group exhibition

=== 2025 ===
- Sin Wai Kin Man's World
- Liv Bugge Umbilical Fire
- Acid Prints Håkon Bleken, Odd Harrong, Ramon Isern, Per Kleiva, Ilse Claesson, and Axel Salto
- Teen Creators Vol. 2, group exhibition
- Polina Mihajlovna Chernitskaya Future Fragments: Dowry Beyond the Material
- Yuliya Antonova Body Framed
- Hidden Mothers, group exhibition
- Yijue Zeng Mum's Conversation
- American Artist The Monophobic Response
- Shape the Echo, Literary group exhibition with over 100 authors influenced by Octavia E. Butler
- Madeleine Andersson 10K VIRGIN BRAINS
- Céline Mathieu Lån
- Hanne Lippard All the same bright
- Teen Creators Vol. 3

=== 2026 ===
- Pilvi Takala Breaking Ranks
