= Adam Kleinman =

American curator and writer

Adam Kleinman is an American curator and writer who has served as the director and chief curator of Kunsthall Trondheim since 2023.

== Career ==
In 2004, Kleinman curated the "Arrivals" program as part of the exhibition Terminal 5, at John F. Kennedy International Airport.

In 2009, he became the curator of the Lower Manhattan Cultural Council, and led to the development and programming of LentSpace, a temporary public art park that occupied a disused block in Downtown Manhattan. A review in The New York Times described the inaugural installation of sculptures as a "...[play] on the conventions of city park design or on the idea of what deserves to be classified as public art."

From 2007-2008 Kleinman participated in the Whitney Independent Study Program.

In 2012, Kleinman acted as Agent for Public Programming at dOCUMENTA (13).

From 2013, Kleinman was editor-in-chief and adjunct curator at Witte de With Center for Contemporary Art. He has also served as the regional curator for North America at Kadist.

== Teaching and residencies ==
In 2012, Kleinman participated in the International Visitor Programme run by the Office of Contemporary Art Norway.

In 2013, Kleinman was a Robert Lehman Visiting Artist at the Cooper Union.

In 2016, Kleinman was a fellow at the Banff International Curatorial Institute.

== Exhibitions and writings ==
Artists centered in Kleinman's work include Pierre Huyghe, Britta Marakatt-Labba, Emilie Louise Gossiaux, American Artist, Gala Porras-Kim, Emilija Škarnulytė, Hannah Ryggen, Walid Raad, Rossella Biscotti, Trevor Paglen, John Gerrard,Sin Wai Kin, Andros Zins-Browne and Jérôme Bel. Kleinman has also interviewed the physicists Karen Barad and Anton Zeilinger.

Recurring themes addressed by his exhibitions and articles include the history of computing, surveillance, the affordances of technology, relations of art and politics, as well as natural disasters and other forms of nonhuman agency.

His curated exhibitions have garnered multiple best-of-year recognitions, including "Gala Porras-Kim: Precipitation for an Arid Landscape", "Emilie Louise Gossiaux: Kinship", and Sin Wai Kin's "Man's World".

In 2022, he went on assignment for Artforum to cover the cultural response to the Russo-Ukrainian War from Kyiv.
