= Defne Ayas =

Turkish curator

- Born: 1976 (age 49–50); Lunen
- Occupations: Curator, Museum Director, former Supervisory Board member of Stedelijk Museum; Rijksakademie; Protocinema; The New Centre for Research & Practice
- Known for: Name change to Witte de With; Minds Rising Spirits Tuning - 13th Gwangju Biennale, Kunsthalle for Music, Art in the Age of Asymmetric Warfare, WdWReview, Mindaugas Triennial

Defne Ayas (born 1976) is a curator, lecturer, educator, and editor in the field of contemporary art and its institutions. She is born in Germany, grew up in Istanbul, and is now based in Eindhoven. Since September 2025 she is director of the Van Abbemuseum in Eindhoven.

Ayas directed, cofounded, curated, and advised several art institutes, initiatives, and exhibition platforms across the globe, including in the United States, Netherlands, China and Hong Kong, South Korea, Russia, Lithuania, and Italy. Exploring art's role within social and political processes, Ayas is best known for conceiving inventive exhibition and biennale formats within diverse geographies, in each instance composing interdisciplinary frameworks that provide historical anchoring and engagement with local conditions. Working between Berlin and New York since 2018, she currently serves as Senior Program Advisor and Curator at Large at Performa. Until June 2021, Ayas was the artistic director of the 2021 Gwangju Biennale, together with Natasha Ginwala.

Defne Ayas was the director of the Witte de With Center for Contemporary Art in Rotterdam (2012-2017). Towards the end of her tenure in 2017, she announced that the institution had to change its name to dissociate itself from its namesake, the Dutch naval officer Witte Corneliszoon de With. The institution's decision to change its name was immediately politicized, causing controversy in the Netherlands. The decision for a name change was triggered by an Open Letter to Witte de With published on 14 June 2017 by Egbert Alejandro Martina, Ramona Sno, Hodan Warsame, Patricia Schor, Amal Alhaag, and Maria Guggenbichler, and the debates that followed.

== Education ==
Ayas holds a B.A. in Foreign Affairs from the University of Virginia (1999) and an MPS from the Interactive Telecommunications Program at New York University (2003).

Ayas completed the De Appel Curatorial Training Programme in Amsterdam in 2005, where she unearthed an untapped history of the building of De Appel. Ayas invited artist Michael Blum to re-stage the Dutch looting institution and former Jewish bank named Lippmann, Rosenthal &Co., bequeathing a potent story back into the Dutch contemporary discourse.

== Career ==
Ayas has been a curator of Performa, the biennial of visual art performance in New York founded by RoseLee Goldberg, since its inception in 2005. At Performa, Ayas organized numerous projects and programs with an international roster of acclaimed artists, architects, and writers while overseeing the biennial's architecture, writing, and print programs and its consortium relations. She remains a Curator-at-Large (as of 2018). At Performa's edition in 2023, Ayas recently presented Protest and Performance: A Way of Life (with Kathy Noble), which included performances by Gregg Bordowitz and Pamela Sneed, Rana Hamadeh, and Göksu Kunak. She also co-organized Sonic Tonic Assembly with AGF, Tony Cokes, HxH, and Lamin Fofana a.o. (with Paul O'neill and publics). Before joining Performa, she worked as the Public Programs Coordinator at the New Museum of Contemporary Art, New York, especially for artists' presentations and critical debates on contemporary art and new media. (2003-2005)

As announced by the Gwangju Biennale Foundation, Ayas and Natasha Ginwala served as the artistic directors of the 13th edition of the Gwangju Biennale in 2020. The curatorial duo announced their plans around the exhibition concept of Minds Rising, Spirits Tuning, which emphasized the dialectical space between communal and artificial intelligence shaped by feminist, queer, and Indigenous knowledge. The edition included three publications, including a Feminism(s) reader titled Stronger Than Bone and an online publishing platform, Minds Rising. Additionally, a series of online public programs were organized, including Rising to the Surface: Practicing Solidarity Futures, Augmented Minds and the Incomputable, and a procession titled Through the Gates. The exhibitions featured 40 new commissions by artists such as Korakrit Arunanondchai, Yin-Ju Chen, Vaginal Davis, Patricia Domínguez, Cian Dayrit, John Gerrard, Trajal Harrell, Lynn Hershman Leeson, Gözde İlkin, Sangdon Kim, Liliane Lijn, Candice Lin, Emo de Medeiros, Ana María Millán, Kira Nova, Ana Prvacki, Fernando Palma Rodríguez, Outi Pieski, Angelo Plessas, Gala Porras-Kim, Judy Radul, Sahej Rahal, Jacolby Satterwhite, Alexandra Sukhareva, Sissel Tolaas, Cecilia Vicuña, and Shen Xin, as well as choreographers such as eightOS, Nasa4nasa, and Cecilia Bengolea. The exhibition had to be postponed due to the COVID-19 pandemic until April 2021.

At Witte de With (2012-2017), Ayas oversaw a diverse exhibition and publication program devoted to established and emerging visual artists, writers, and filmmakers from across the globe. With her tenure starting, she commissioned and curated long-term research projects, solo and group exhibitions and ambitious live performance programs, including Kunsthalle for Music by Ari Benjamin Meyers (2017-2018), The Music of Ramon Raquello and his Orchestra by Eric Baudelaire (2017), Öğüt & Macuga by Ahmet Öğüt and Goshka Macuga (2017), The Ten Murders of Josephine by Rana Hamadeh (2017), As If It Were by Bik Van der Pol(2016), Relational Stalinism -The Musical by Michael Portnoy (2016), three-part Art in the Age of...series (with focus on energy and raw materials, asymmetric warfare and planetary computation) (2015), Bit Rot by Douglas Coupland (2015), Character is Fate by Willem de Rooij (2015), Moderation(s) by artist Heman Chong (with Spring, Hong Kong, 2012-2014); Dai Hanzhi: 5000 Artists (curated by Marianne Brouwer, with UCCA, Beijing, 2014); The Humans – a theatrical play by writer and artist Alexandre Singh – and its monthly summits Causeries (2012-2013); the open archive and collection Tulkus 1880 to 2018 by artist Paola Pivi (with Castello di Rivoli and Arthub Asia, 2013-2018), Blueprints by Qiu Zhijie (2012) as well as the award-winning exhibition The Temptation of AA Bronson (2013).

Ayas worked on several biennial projects such as artistic director of 2020 Gwangju Biennale, together with Natasha Ginwala, curator of Respiro by Sarkis, at the Pavilion of Turkey in the 56th International Art Exhibition, Venice Biennale; co-curator the 6th Moscow Biennale ACTING IN A CENTER IN A CITY IN THE HEART OF THE ISLAND OF EURASIA (with Nicolaus Schafhausen and Bart de Baere); curator of the 11th Baltic Triennale (with Benjamin Cook, LUX, in collaboration with artists Ieva Misevičiūtė and Michael Portnoy); co-curator of the Istanbul and Bandung city pavilions as part of the Intercity Project of the 9th Shanghai Biennale. Ayas also served as a curatorial advisor to the 8th Shanghai Biennale (China) and publication advisor to the 8th Gwangju Biennale (South Korea) in 2010.

Ayas co-founded several independent initiatives, including Arthub Asia – an Asia-wide active research and production initiative (with Davide Quadrio) (2007-2012), producing exhibitions and live productions, including operas and performances, and symposia, within the context of China and the rest of Asia, including RMB City by Cao Fei, an opera-drama created with avatar-actors, based on the “model dramas” (Yang Ban Xi) of Cultural Revolution period, presented in Turin in 2009.

Ayas is the founding co-curator (with the late Neery Melkonian) of the Blind Dates Project – an artistic platform dedicated to tackling what remains of the peoples, places, and cultures of the Ottoman Empire (1299-1923).

Ayas was also a curator at the large Spring Workshop (Hong Kong, a non-profit arts space committed to an international cross-disciplinary program of artist and curatorial residencies, exhibitions, music, and talks. (2013-2017). She consulted on residencies at Spring Workshop, including collaborations with artists such as Wu Tsang, Qiu Zhijie, Christodoulos Panayiotou, and Heman Chong, among others, working alongside Founder Mimi Brown.

Ayas served on many juries, including the 2024 Schering Stiftung Award for Artistic Research, the 2019 Venice Biennale International Jury,[21] Prince Claus Awards, the Jury for DAAD Artists-in-Berlin Program, and The Eliasson Global Leadership Prize of the Tällberg Foundation. Ayas was a member of the jury that awarded the Golden Lion for Best National Participation to Lithuania's pavilion for "Sun & Sea (Marina)" at the 58th International Art Exhibition of La Biennale di Venezia in 2019. The jury, chaired by Stephanie Rosenthal, included Ayas alongside Cristiana Collu, Sunjung Kim, and Hamza Walker. Ayas is currently a board member of Stedelijk Museum Amsterdam, the Rijksakademie (Amsterdam), Tällberg Foundation, The New Centre for Research & Practice, Collectorspace (Istanbul), Sabanci Museum (Istanbul), and Protocinema (Istanbul).

When the Istanbul Biennial’s advisory board unanimously chose Ayas as curator for the event's 2024 edition, the Istanbul Foundation for Culture and Arts (İKSV) rejected the board's recommendation and instead appointed Iwona Blazwick; at the time of her selection, Blazwick was a serving member of the advisory panel tasked with choosing a curator for the biennial. Responding to public criticism, Blazwick stepped down in early 2024.

== Publications ==
Ayas is a publisher, editor, and contributor to several books, including:

- Stronger Than Bone (2021) by Defne Ayas, Natasha Ginwala and Jill Winder
- Minds Rising, Spirits Tuning(2021) by Defne Ayas and Natasha Ginwala
- Blessing and Transgressing: A Live Institute (2018) by Defne Ayas
- Wdw Review Vol.1.1: Arts, Culture, and Journalism in Revolt (2017) by Defne Ayas and Adam Kleinman
- Wdw Review Vol.1: Arts, Culture, and Journalism in Revolt (2017) by Defne Ayas and Adam Kleinman
- How to Gather: Acting Relations, Mapping Positions (2017) by Defne Ayas and Bart De Baere
- Were It As If (2017) by Defne Ayas and Bik Van Der Pol
- Causeries (2016) by Alexandre Singh
- Unicorns in a Blueprint (2016) by Qiu Zhijie
- Art in the Age of... (2015)
- Bit Rot (2015) by Douglas Coupland
- Character Is Fate (2015) Piet Mondrian’s Horoscope (Willem de Rooij)
- Respiro by Sarkis (2015)
- End Note(s): Moderation(s) 2012-2014 (2015)
- Erik van Lieshout: Home South (2015)
- Performa 13 (2015)
- The Crime Was Almost Perfect (2014)
- Performa 11: Staging Ideas (2013)
- Performa 09: (2011)
- The Making of Meeting (2013)
- Füsun Onur (2013)
- Performa (2007)

Ayas launched Witte de With's experimental online publishing platform WdWReview in 2013, with global editorial desks in Moscow, Istanbul, Delhi/Calcutta, Shanghai, Cairo, and Athens, together with writer and curator Adam Kleinman, the Chief Editor of the journal. In addition, Ayas has published in art magazines and journals such as Mousse, Extra Extra Magazine, Yishu Journal, and Creative Time Reports.

== Teaching/lectures ==
Ayas was an adjunct professor of Contemporary Art and New Media at NYU Shanghai. (2005-2012) Her research focused on the formation of the local art ecology, with focus on politics and history of cultural exchanges and collective artistic endeavors. Ayas continues to be a regular guest teacher at various universities such as SVA Curatorial Studies; University of Hawaii; Art Institute at the FHNW Academy of Art and Design, Basel; UDK Berlin; a guest lecturers at museums such as Tate Modern and the Metropolitan Museum and at art fairs including Art Basel, Frieze, and Artissima.
