= Eastern Bloc (art centre) =

Eastern Bloc is an artist-run centre based in Montreal, Quebec, Canada, dedicated to digital art. The centre was founded by Eliane Ellbogen and Sandor Poloskei in 2007. Its programming includes meeting with artists (Salon : Data), new media art laboratories, residencies, and the annual Sight and Sound festival.

== Sight and Sound Festival ==
Sight and Sound is an international festival presenting digital art performances and installations as well as conferences on this subject. In line with the centre mandate, it gives an important place to emerging artists.

In 2015, the festival theme was HyperLocal. It included the work of Daniel Jolliffe.

In 2014, the festival was centred around the theme of black market and clandestineness, presenting artists such Nicolas Maigret, Steve Bates, Erin Sexton and Melissa F. Clarke.

In 2012, the festival was concerned with symmetrical systems.

== Residencies ==
Eastern Bloc hosts artist residencies (for local and international artists). The program promulgates critical engagement, with a focus on DIY and open source culture as well as the political discourse surrounding contemporary digital culture.

Past artists in residence include:

2015-2016:

- Yolanda Duarte
- Lucas Paris

2014-2015:

- Sofian Audry, Samuel St-Aubin, Stephen Kelly
- Santiago Leal
- Audrey Samson

2013-2014:

- Sahar Kubba
- Erin Gee
- Jordan Loeppky-Kolesnik
- Jan Reimer and Max Stein

2012-2013:

- Collectif Termostat
- Fiona Annis
- Tyson Parks
- Kelly Jaclynn Andres

== See also ==
- Canadian artist-run centres
- New Media art festivals
