= Daniel Jolliffe =

Canadian media artist (1964–2021)

Daniel Logan Jolliffe
- Jolliffe in 2015
- Born: June 5, 1964; Ontario, Canada
- Died: October 30, 2021 (aged 57); Montreal, Canada
- Education: Ohio State University; University of Victoria
- Known for: New media artist, installation artist
- Movement: Art and technology

Daniel Jolliffe (June 5, 1964 – October 30, 2021) was a Canadian media artist and art professor who created works of art, design, and performance projects using technologies such as Global Positioning Systems (GPS). His interactive kinetic work and public art has been exhibited in the United States, Canada and abroad.

== Life and work ==
Jolliffe received an MFA degree from Ohio State University and a BA in Philosophy from the University of Victoria. His interactive sculpture, One Free Minute, was performed across America and the DIY version (instructions to 'Throw Your Voice', published in Make magazine in 2005) was included in Design Life Now, the National Design Triennial curated by Ellen Lupton and exhibited at the Cooper-Hewitt National Design Museum in 2006. Jolliffe exhibited with artists including Jocelyn Robert, Thecla Schiphorst, Garnet Hertz, Ken Gregory and others and wrote about the work of Diana Burgoyne and Diane Landry.

Jolliffe's electronic machine sculptures and installations generate novelty, displaying strategic systems between humans and communities of machines. His artworks have been compared to Gordon Pask and others who have worked with computational intelligence and complex systems. The novelty generated in Jolliffe's work arises from "new relationships that are constantly formed, broken and reformed. The novelty is systemic."

Jolliffe was connected to the new media art scene internationally, exhibiting his work at Eastern Bloc (art centre) in Canada, ZKM in Germany, and attending festivals and conferences such as ISEA, WRO in Poland, and FILE Electronic Language International Festival in Brazil. His art was chosen for the WRO Media Art Biennale in Poland 2015, and in 2019 his project Control Panels was exhibited at Currents 826 on Canyon Road, Santa Fe, New Mexico.

Jolliffe died in Montreal on October 30, 2021. A file on his work can be found in the National Gallery of Canada Library and Archives - Canadian Museum of Contemporary Photography.

=== Nearest Costco, Monument or Satellite ===
Daniel Jolliffe, Nearest Costco, Monument or Satellite, 2015.

Jolliffe's 2014-15 kinetic installation, Nearest Costco, Monument or Satellite, deployed networked technology to humorously explore a contemporary sense of place. The work involved a grouping of sculptures built in fourteen road cases each of which was outfitted with a telescoping mast with a pointing arrow at its terminus. Using locative technologies, when interacted with, these units point to the nearest orbiting GPS satellite, Costco store and local monument. Jolliffe described the work as a "kind of elaborate joke, but it's a serious one." The work was exhibited in Montreal, ISEA Vancouver, at the Museum of Nantes in France. The work is a type of machine performance, that produces "choreographed poetic movement" of an array of arrows to convey both information and materiality.

=== Room for Walking ===
Jolliffe and collaborator, Thecla Schiphorst created Room for Walking in 1999 using interactive technologies that mimic human sight and speech, kinesthetics, and spatial awareness to investigate the meanings of communication. Jolliffe's part in the collaboration involved a small wagon-like vehicle that operated like a computer mouse to control a projection of a topographical satellite image. The work was described in the Regina Leader-Post newspaper as technological "new nature" where territory can be investigated through traces of the body.

=== Control Panels ===
Jolliffe's 2019 work, Control Panels dealt with the confluence of human perception and knowledge making. The installation incorporated an array of custom-built control panels fitted with dials, buttons and switches of uncertain purpose. Jolliffe states that: "Control Panels is a set of non-functional interfaces...designed to be very attractive to the viewer; you really want to touch them and turn the dials. This is the crux of the work: to show how attractive technological interfaces draw you in and make you lose track of who you are and your emotions." The work highlights absurdity within technology especially when real human emotions are part of the interface.

=== Shift ===
Jolliffe's interactive work, Shift, from 1997, deployed two small technological objects, a bowl and a small platform on wheels. Participants step onto the platform, and are able to transmit their movements through a radio system hidden within the platform, to the bowl across the room, thus controlling its movement.

== Public art ==
Jolliffe's interactive public "speech sculpture", One Free Minute, was exhibited at La Biennale de Montréal in 2009, after being presented in 2006 at the World Urban Festival. The premise of the piece is the question, "What would you say given one free minute of anonymous public speech?" The artist found that many people carefully considered the content of their one-minute speech in a public space.

== Collections ==
Jolliffe's work Perfect View (2016), is held in the permanent collection of Zebrastraat Vaste Kunstcollectie, Stichting Liedts-Messen, Ghent, Belgium.
