= Nolan Oswald Dennis =

South African artist

Nolan Oswald Dennis (born 1988) is a South African artist working between science, technology, and political history.

== Biography ==
Nolan Oswald Dennis was born in Lusaka, Zambia to South African parents in exile during Apartheid. He grew up in Midrand, South Africa.

=== Education ===
Dennis completed a B.Arch at the School of Architecture and Planning at Wits University in Johannesburg, and a MSc in Art Culture and Technology at Massachusetts Institute of Technology in Cambridge.

=== Work ===
A 2025 review for ArtReview described Dennis as working in "a incisive and excisional ‘para-disciplinary’ practice, which traverses sculpture, film, diagrams and other less readily categorised media.. summon[ing] and strategis[ing] with Black and Indigenous African forces". He has presented his work at Zeitz MOCAA, Kunstinstituut Melly; the Liverpool Biennial, Shanghai Biennial, Gasworks Gallery, and the Swiss Institute NY.

=== Collaborations ===
Dennis works collaboratively with Bogosi Sekhukhuni and Tabita Rezaire as NTU

== Notable Exhibitions ==
- ubuntu: un réve lucid, Palais de Tokyo, Paris, 2021
- Liverpool Biennial, Liverpool, 2023
- UNDERSTUDIES, Zeitz MOCAA, Cape Town, 2024
- overturns, Swiss Institute, New York, 2025

== Awards and honours ==
Awards include the FNB Art prize (2016) and the Videobrazil Jury prize (2023). He was on the shortlist of the 2023 Future Generations Art prize (2024)
