= Stefanie Hessler =

German art curator and art writer

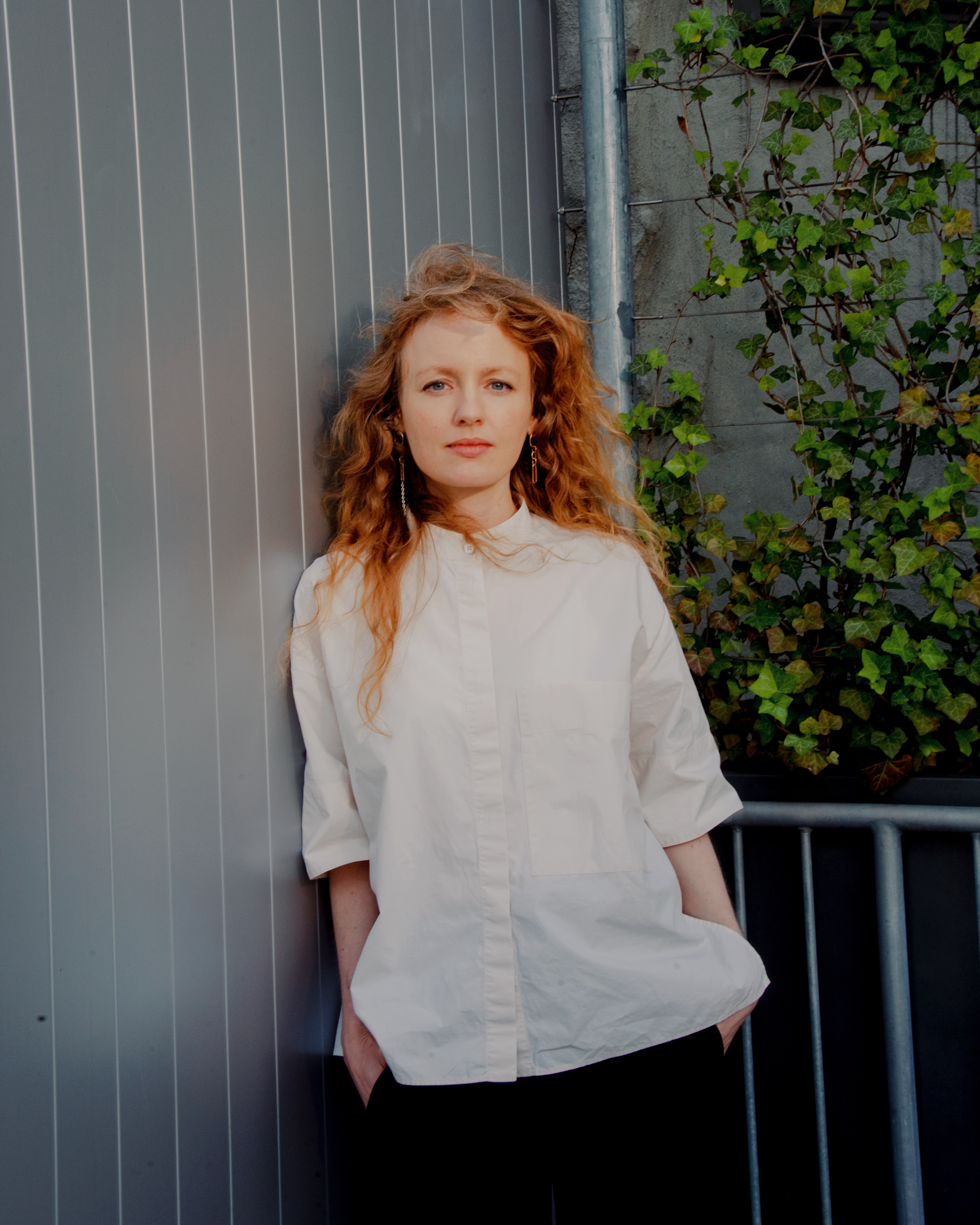
- Born: 1987 (age 38–39); Germany
- Occupation: Curator

Stefanie Hessler is a German-born contemporary art curator, an art writer, and the current director of Swiss Institute in New York. From 2019 to 2022 she was the director of Kunsthall Trondheim in Trondheim, Norway.

== Biography ==
Hessler studied art theory in Germany and at Stockholm University where she received her MA in art curation in 2011. She earned her PhD from the University of Westminster in London with the thesis "Toward a Curatorial Praxis of Planetarity."

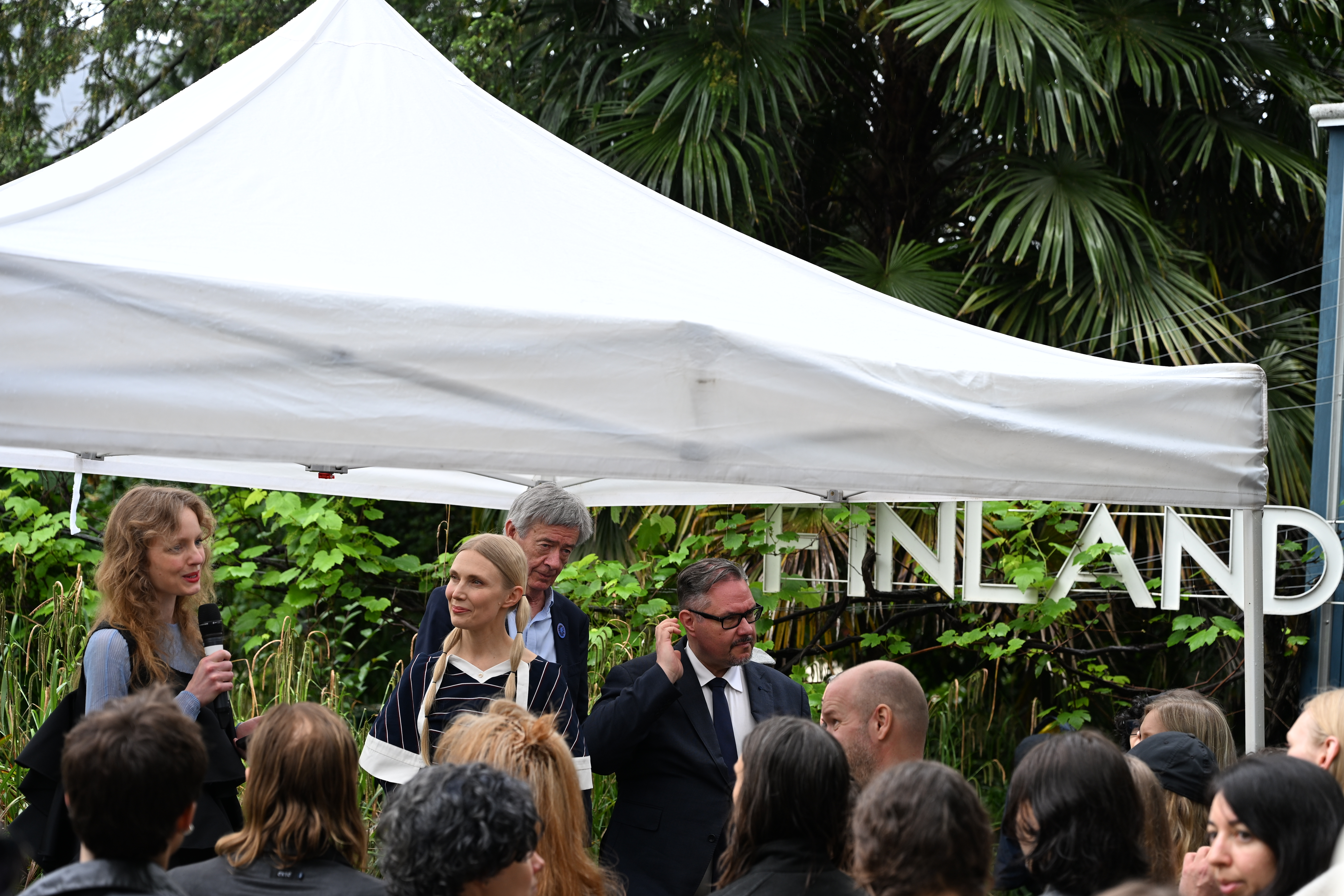
Stefanie Hessler, Jenna Sutela, opening of the finnish pavilon

She co-founded the experimental performance space "Andquestionmark" along with artist Carsten Höller in Stockholm, Sweden, in 2013. Hessler was a curator for the TBA21–Academy in London, UK, between 2016 and 2019, and was the director of Kunsthall Trondheim from 2019 to 2022.

=== Exhibitions ===
Hessler has curated art exhibitions with a focus on interdisciplinary research, technology, ecology, intersectional and queer feminism, sensory experience, and focused among others on the topic of ocean ecology.

Hessler was named among ArtReview's Power100 and among Apollo's 40 und 40 in the category "Thinkers."

She is the curator of the Pavilion of Finland at the 61st Venice Biennale Arte in 2026, presenting the work of the artist Jenna Sutela.

She is a curator of the 2026 Counterpublic Triennial in St. Louis, Missouri.

Hessler is the curator of Parcours, the public art sector of Art Basel.

At Swiss Institute, she introduced operational initiatives to address climate change. She also curated the long-term exhibition "Spora" (2023), inviting artists to intervene in the physical building and processes of the institution through environmental institutional and infrastructural critique. She curated the New York-wide exhibition "Energies" (2024), which the art critic John Vincler called "one of the boldest curatorial feats" in recent memory, with contributions by among others Otobong Nkanga, Cannupa Hanska Luger, Liu Chuang, Gordon Matta-Clark.

In 2021 she was project co-leader for the transdisciplinary research project and exhibition "Sex Ecologies" exploring the intersections of gender, sexuality, and nature as well as pleasure, affect, and the powers of the erotic in human and more-than-human worlds. She edited the eponymous compendium published by The MIT Press, Kunsthall Trondheim and The Seed Box with new essays by Mel Y. Chen, Jack Halberstam, Astrida Neimanis, and others. The exhibition included artists Jes Fan, Anne Duk Hee Jordan, Okwui Okpokwasili, Margrethe Pettersen, Alberta Whittle, and others.

In 2021 she was chief curator of the 17th MOMENTA biennale in Montreal, Canada. The biennale was titled "Sensing Nature." It centred indigenous and non humanist notions of nature and attended "to how contemporary and emerging non-white, Indigenous, queer and crip artists, collectives and communities feel nature and/or are felt by it in return."

In 2020 she co-curated the exhibition “Down to Earth” at the Gropius Bau in Berlin.

In 2019 Hessler curated the exhibition and performance "Moving Off The Land II" by Joan Jonas at Ocean Space in Venice, and the exhibition "More-than-humans" by Dominique Gonzalez-Foerster and Tomás Saraceno at the Thyssen-Bornemisza Museum in Madrid, Spain.

In 2018 she curated an exhibition on the artist Juan Downey at the Royal Institute of Art in Stockholm, the exhibition "Prospecting Ocean" with artist Armin Linke at the Institute of Marine Sciences in Venice, Italy, which was commissioned by TBA21–Academy and in partnership with Istituto di Scienze Marine (CNR-ISMAR), as well as a performance by Joan Jonas at the Tate Modern's Turbine Hall entitled "Moving Off The Land". The same year she was one of three curators for the 6th edition of the Athens Biennale, and she curated the symposium "Practices of Attention" for the São Paulo Biennale on the politics of attention.

In 2017 Hessler curated the exhibition "Sugar and Speed" at the Museum of Modern Art in Recife, Brazil and the project "Fishing for Islands" with Chus Martínez at the Hamburger Bahnhof in Berlin, Germany.

In 2015 she co-curated the 8th MOMENTUM biennale in Moss, Norway.

Hessler has worked with artists such as Christine Sun Kim, Florian Hecker, Jenna Sutela, Joan Jonas, Tomás Saraceno, Dominique Gonzalez-Foerster, Frida Orupabo, Isabel Lewis, Adrian Piper, Sissel Tolaas, Tabita Rezaire.

=== Teaching ===
Hessler was a guest professor in art theory at the Royal Institute of Art in Stockholm between 2017 and 2019. She is currently visiting research scholar at the University of Westminster in London.

=== Writing ===
Hessler is the author of Prospecting Ocean published by MIT Press that explores ocean extraction through artistic research. Bruno Latour wrote a foreword to the book. Hessler is also the editor of the book Tidalectics: Imagining An Oceanic Worldview through Art and Science, also published by MIT Press, which is a collection of essays, research, and art projects.

Hessler is a writer of arts criticism and contributes to publications such as Art Review Art Agenda and Mousse Magazine.
