= Frida Orupabo =

Norwegian artist (born 1986)

Frida Orupabo (born 1986) is a Norwegian artist who makes work about identity, sexuality, race and belonging, using collage and video installation made from visual material found online. She is also a trained sociologist. Orupabo's mother is Norwegian and her father is Nigerian. She has had solo exhibitions at Fotomuseum Winterthur in Switzerland and at Astrup Fearnley Museum of Modern Art in Oslo, and her work was shown in the 58th Venice Biennale. She has an Honorary Fellowship from the Royal Photographic Society in the UK.

== Early life and education ==
Orupabo was born and grew up in Sarpsborg, Norway. She has a White Norwegian mother and a Black Nigerian father. She obtained a bachelor's degree in development studies then a master's degree in sociology from the University of Oslo.

== Work ==
She was shortlisted for the Deutsche Börse Photography Foundation Prize in 2023. The work—about identity, sexuality, race and belonging—was described by Sean O'Hagan in The Guardian as "sculptural photographic collages [. . . ] strange, hybrid creations [. . . ] Her raw material is sourced from the digital sphere – images found on social media, eBay and old colonial archives. Printed, cut out and then layered in segments, her collages have a distinctly old-fashioned, hands-on feel, but her mainly female figures are loaded with meaning, both personal and cultural."

== Awards ==
- 2023: Honorary Fellowship, Royal Photographic Society, Bristol, UK

== Personal life ==
She lives in Oslo, Norway.

== Publications ==
- Monograph. Kunsthall Trondheim / Sternberg, 2021. Edited by Stefanie Hessler. ISBN 978-3-95679-623-4. With essays by Hessler, Lola Olufemi, and Legacy Russell. Published on the occasion of an exhibition at Kunsthall Trondheim.
- Hours After. Stevenson Gallery, 2021. Exhibition catalogue.
- On Lies, Secrets and Silence. Bonniers Konsthall / Astrup Fearnley Museum of Modern Art / Skira, 2024. Edited by Yuvinka Medina and Owen Martin. ISBN 9788857253107. Exhibition catalogue.

== Exhibitions ==
=== Solo exhibitions ===
- Frida Orupabo: "How did you feel when you come out of the wilderness", Kunsthall Trondheim, Trondheim, Norway, September–November 2021
- I have seen a million pictures of my face and still I have no idea, Fotomuseum Winterthur, Winterthur, Switzerland, February–May 2022
- On Lies, Secrets and Silence, Bonniers Konsthall, Stockholm, August–November 2024; Astrup Fearnley Museum of Modern Art, Oslo, February–April 2025
- Spectrum International Prize for Photography, Sprengel Museum, Hanover, Germany, April–July 2025

=== Group exhibitions or exhibitions as part of festivals ===
- Central Pavilion / Arsenale, 58th Venice Biennale, Venice, Italy, 2019
- Infinite Identities – Photography in the Age of Sharing, Huis Marseille, Museum for Photography, Amsterdam, November 2020 – August 2021. With Farah Al Qasimi, Coco Capitán, Myriam Boulos, Martine Gutierrez, Santi Palacios, Thomas Lohr and Nick Sethi.
- How Fast Shall We Sing, La Mécanique générale, LUMA Arles, as part of Rencontres d'Arles, Arles, France, 2022
- Deutsche Börse Photography Foundation Prize, The Photographers' Gallery, London, 2023. With Bieke Depoorter, Samuel Fosso, and Arthur Jafa.

== Collections ==
Orupabo's work is held in the following permanent collection:

- Studio Museum in Harlem, New York
