= Kajsa Dahlberg =

Swedish artist

Kajsa Dahlberg, born 1973 in Gothenburg, is a Swedish artist. She graduated from Malmö Art Academy in 2003, lives and works in Berlin. Dahlberg works with video, text and sound, which investigates how storytelling is created and conveyed in relation to censorship, political representation, history and identity.

In 2007, she had a separate exhibition at Index in Stockholm. Her works have been shown at biennials and group exhibitions around the world, including the first Athens Biennale 2007, the third Prague Biennial 2007, The Royal College of Art in London 2007, Momentum Nordic Biennial for Contemporary in Moss 2006, Sala Rekalde in Bilbao 2006, and the Moderna Museet in Stockholm 2004. In 2008 Dahlberg went to the Whitney Museum of American Art Independent Study program in New York. Dahlberg has work in the permanent collection of Moderna Museet in Stockholm, Sweden.
