= Rossella Biscotti =

Italian visual artist

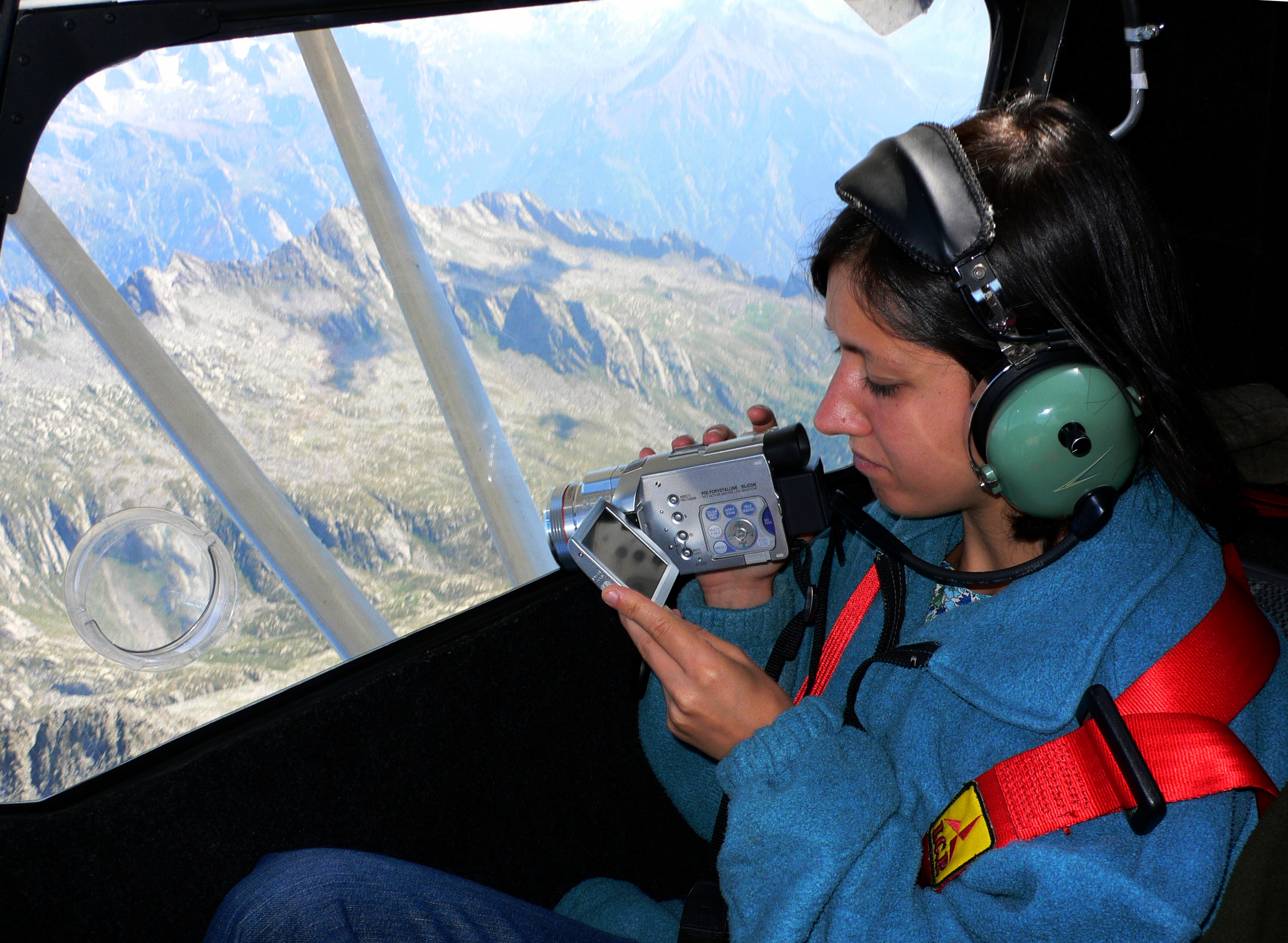
- Born: Rossella Biscotti; 11 December 1978 (age 47); Molfetta, Italy
- Education: Accademia di Belle Arti di Napoli (IT), Rijksakademie van Beeldende Kunsten Amsterdam (NL), Advance Course in Visual Art Fondazione A. Ratti Como (IT)
- Occupation: Artist
- Years active: 2003 - ongoing
- Known for: Visual arts
- Notable work: The Sun Shines in Kiev, 2006 The Heads in Question, 2009-2015 The Trial, 2010–2013 Title One: The Task of the Community, 2012 I dreamt that you changed into a cat… gatto… ha ha ha, 2013 The Prison of Santo Stefano, 2013 Clara, 2016 The City, 2018 Rubber Works, 2019-2022 The Journey, 2021-ongoing

Rossella Biscotti (born 1978) is an artist whose practice cuts across sculpture, performance, sound works, and filmmaking.

She explores and reconstructs social and political moments from recent times through the subjectivity and experiences of individuals often in opposition to violent institutionalised systems. Stemming from extended research processes, conceptual excavations, personal encounters, interdisciplinary collaborations, and the subtle interrogation of sites and stories, her works encapsulate meticulous stratifications of materials and meanings.

She has taken part in major international exhibitions as After Rain, Diriyah Contemporary Art Biennale, Diriyah-Riyadh (SA) curated by Ute Meta Bauer; Dhaka Art Summit (2020), Contour Biennale (2017), Sonsbeek 23th (2016), 55th Venice Biennale and 13th Istanbul Biennale (2013), dOCUMENTA 13 and Manifesta 9 (2012). Her work has been presented in solo exhibitions at Kunstinstituut Melly (2019), Kunsthaus Baselland and daadgalerie (2018), V–A–C Foundation at the Gulag History Museum in Moscow (2016), Museion Bolzano (2015), Wiels, Sculpture Center New York, and Secession (2013). Biscotti has received several international awards.

== Early life and education ==
She graduated from the Accademia di Belle Arti in Naples in 2002, she attended the Rijksakademie van Beeldende Kunsten in Amsterdam in 2010–2011. Back in 2000 she was selected for the Advanced Course in Visual Art at the Fondazione Antonio Ratti in Como. The visiting professor was Ilya Kabakov.

== Career ==
She focuses on social and political events which sometimes have happened in the distant past and become the starting point for the investigation of individual or collective identity and memory.

Her methodology is based on a meticulous preliminary research into archival materials such as found documents, audio recordings or newspapers documenting stories and events which have been forgotten by history. She uses archive materials to underline the loss of information, the ambiguity of reconstructions and their possible uses as well. Biscotti is interested in the potentiality of new narrations when they start circulating again through her artworks.

With Le Teste in Oggetto (The Heads in Question, 2009) the artist analyzes the relations between art and power, raising questions about the status of contemporary artists and their degree of intellectual and conceptual autonomy. The sculpture consists of the heads of King Victor Emmanuel III of Italy and Benito Mussolini, which were found by the artist in the storerooms of the Palazzo degli Uffici in the EUR district in Rome. The sculptures were created for the Esposizione universale (1942) which never took place because of Italy's involvement in World War II. Biscotti decided to appropriate them and exposed them to the public for the first time. Doing so, the artist radically reversed their original meaning: rather than celebratory monuments, they became the focus of reflection and discussion.

In her work Il Processo (The Trial, 2010–12) she focuses on the April 7th trial (1983–84), against the members of Autonomia Operaia. The trial was held in the Aula Bunker in Rome, a high-security courthouse, which hosted the most important trials of the period known as Anni di Piombo (Years of Lead). She created an installation composed by concrete sculptures made from casts of the architectural features of the courtroom, taken before their demolition. The installation is accompanied by a six-hour audio edited recording of the April 7 trial. Defendants in the court case included the philosophers Antonio Negri and Paolo Virno, and other intellectuals accused of being ideologically and morally responsible for Italian terrorism developed in the late 1970s. Il Processo won the MAXXI prize in 2010, promoted by MAXXI – Museo nazionale delle arti del XXI secolo in Rome.

The human condition and circumstances in detention are the focus of I dreamt that you changed into a cat...gatto...ha ha ha (2013). Rossella Biscotti developed her research in the women's prison on Giudecca island at the Venetian lagoon. This prison is not like a traditional one where inmates are locked and unproductive; on the contrary, the prisoners spend their time working outside the prison. As all prison cells are open, Biscotti was given the opportunity to meet every prisoner by creating a dream workshop, called ‘oneiric laboratory’. Using the workshop as a platform to communicate with the prisoners, Biscotti analyzed the institution and the way the inmates figure in it. She processed her research in a sculpture made of compost, which was the result of work that has been done by inmates in the kitchen, cleaning, the growing of vegetables and consumption. The work was presented during the 55th Venice Biennale in 2013.

== Exhibitions ==
Her work has been exhibited widely throughout Italy and abroad, in major museums and galleries.

=== Solo exhibitions ===
- 2024 Title One, I dreamt, Clara and other stories, Castello di Rivoli Museo d’Arte Contemporanea, Rivoli - Torino (IT)
- 2023 Cable City Dance Cable City Sea, Fabra i Coats, Barcelona (ES)
- 2022 Trees on Land, mor charpentier, Paris (FR)
- 2021 Clara and Other Specimens, Stadtgalerie Zwergelgartenpavillon, Salzburg (AT)
- 2019 new work, Witte de With (now Kunstinstituut Melly), Rotterdam (NL)
- 2019 The City, daadgalerie, Berlin (DE)
- 2019 Three Works and a Script, Blitz, Valletta (MT)
- 2019 Clara and Other Specimens, Curated by Lorenzo Benedetti, Fondazione Antonio Ratti, Villa Sucota, Como (IT)
- 2018 A shirt, blue pants, blue jeans, a towel, Kunst-Station Sankt Peter, Köln (DE)
- 2018 Rossella Biscotti: The City, Kunsthaus Baselland (CH)
- 2018 The Standing Wave, Steirische Herbst, Graz (AT)
- 2017 Crude Oil, Wilfried Lentz Rotterdam (NL)
- 2017 Premio Acacia, Museo del Novecento, Milano (IT)
- 2016 The Trial, V-A-C Foundation at GULAG History State Museum, Moscow (RU)
- 2016 Rossella Biscotti & Kevin van Braak, Škuc Gallery, Ljubljana (SI)
- 2015 The future can only be for ghosts, Museion, Bolzano (IT).
- 2014 10 x 10, Mies van der Rohe Stipend, Museum Haus Esters, Krefeld (DE).
- 2014 The Undercover Man, Sculpture Center, Long Island City, New York (US).
- 2014 For the Mnemonist, S., Wiels, Brussels (BE).
- 2013 The Trial, e-flux, New York (US).
- 2013 The Side Room, Wiener Secession, Vienna (AT).
- 2012 Title One: The tasks of the Community, CAC, Vilnius (LT).
- 2012 L'Isola, De Vleeshal, Middelburg (NL).
- 2012 This is a special blackout edition!, Kadist Art Foundation, Paris (FR)
- 2011 The Prison of Santo Stefano, Rijksakademie Open, Rijksakademie van Beeldende Kunsten, Amsterdam (NL)
- 2010 Il Processo (The Trial), RijksakademieOpen, Rijksakademie van Beeldende Kunsten, Amsterdam (NL).
- 2010 168 sections of a human brain, Galleria Civica di Trento (IT).
- 2010 The sun shines in Kiev, Adelaide festival (AU)
- 2009 A short story about memory, pentothal and dreams, Kunstlerhaus Bethanien, Berlin (DE).
- 2009 After four rotations of A, B and C will make one revolution (with Kevin van Braak), Samsa, Berlin (DE).
- 2009 Le Teste in Oggetto, Nomas Foundation, Rome (IT).
- 2008 The Undercover Man, Wilfried Lentz, Rotterdam (NL)
- 2008 You Have to Be Focused, Prometeo Gallery, Lucca (IT).
- 2008 New Crossroads (with Kevin van Braak), Galleria Studio la Citta’, Verona (IT).
- 2008 Everything is somehow related with..., Piccolo Museion - Cubo Garutti, Bolzano (IT)
- 2008 The Sun Shines in Kiev, Italian Academy at Columbia University, New York (US).
- 2006 The Sun Shines in Kiev, Tent, Rotterdam (NL)
- 2005 L’Italia è una repubblica democratica fondata sul lavoro, Galerie Paolo Boselli, Brussels (BE)
- 2002 Rossella Biscotti, Galleria T293, Naples (IT)

=== Selected group exhibitions ===
- 2024 After Rain, Diriyah Contemporary Art Biennale, Diriyah-Riyadh (SA) curated by Ute Meta Bauer
- 2023 The Other. Re-Imagine the Future, Kunsthaus Graz (AT)
- 2023 Indigo Waves and Other Stories, Gropius Bau, Berlin (DE) curated by Bonaventure Soh Bejeng Ndikung and Natasha Ginwala
- 2023 The weather is uncertain tonight, as is my soul, University Gallery Angewandte, Heiligenkreuzerhof Schönlaterngasse, Vienna (AT)
- 2023 Style Congo. Heritage & Heresy, CIVA, Brussels (BE) curated by Sammy Baloji, Silvia Franceschini and Nikolaus Hirsch, Estelle Lecaille
- 2022 Clara and crawly creatures, Rijksmuseum, Amsterdam (NL)
- 2022 The future behind us, Villa Arson, Nice (FR)
- 2021 Beaufort 21, Triennale de Beaufort, Belgian coast (BE) curated by Heidi Ballet
- 2021 Dream City - Festival d'Art dans la Cité, L'ArtRue, Tunis, Tunisia (TN)
- 2021 15th Bienal de Cuenca, Cuenca (EC) curated by Blanca de la Torre
- 2020 Eroded Landscape, Musée de Rochechouart (FR)
- 2020 Dhaka Art Summit, Dhaka (BD)
- 2017 Contour Biënnale #8, Polyphonic Worlds: Justice as Medium, Mechelen (BE) curated by Natasha Ginwala
- 2016 SONSBEEK'16: transACTION, Arnhem (NL) curated by ruangrupa
- 2016 16a Quadriennale d’arte, Palazzo delle Esposizioni, Rome (IT)
- 2013 55th Venice Biennale, The Encyclopedic Palace, Venice (IT)
- 2013 13th Istanbul Biennial, Mom, am I Barbarian?, Istanbul (TR)
- 2012 Manifesta 9, Genk (BE)
- 2012 dOCUMENTA 13, Kassel (DE)
- 2012 Higher Atlas, 4th Marrakech Biennale (MA)

=== Awards ===
In 2022 she won the Premio Nazionale Arti Visive Gallarate, MAGA, Gallarate. She was artist in residence at L’art Rue, Tunis in 2022, at NTU CCA, Singapore in 2020 and at DAAD Artists-in-Berlin Program, Berlin in 2018. She won the ACACIA prize for Contemporary Art, Museo del Novecento, Milano (IT) in 2017 and the 16esima Quadriennale di Roma prize, Rome (IT) in 2016. In 2013 she was recipient of the Mies van der Rohe Stipend. In 2010 she won the Premio Michelangelo at Post Monument, XIV International Sculpture Biennale of Carrara (IT), and the Premio Italia Arte Contemporanea 2010. In 2009 she won the Premio Fondazione Ettore Fico, Artissima Art Fair, Turin (IT), the 2nd Prize Prix de Rome, Amsterdam (NL) and the Emerging Talents Award, Strozzina Foundation, Florence (IT). In 2008 she was recipient of 1st Prize Golden Cow at Gstaadfilm Festival, Gstaad (CH). In 2007 she was awarded with the 1st Prize The City of Geneva Grand Prize at the 12th Biennial of Moving Images, at the Centre pour l’image contemporaine, Geneva (CH). In 2006 she won the Premio NY promoted by Italian Ministry of Foreign Affairs in collaboration with the Italian Academy and the Columbia University in New York (US).
