= Rana Hamadeh =

Performance and visual artist from Lebanon

- Born: Lebanon
- Education: 2005 BA The Lebanese University, Faculty of Fine Arts; 2009 MFA, Dutch Art Institute/ArtEZ

Rana Hamadeh (born 1983) is an artist from Lebanon based in the Netherlands. Her interdisciplinary projects span theatrical performances, sound, text and cartographic works, among others, allowing for a discursive approach to subject matter.

== Artwork ==
Many of her works question the authority of historical voice, creating visibility around erased or unrecorded voices. As part of her artistic practice she has embraced the role of scientist, historian or archivist as a means of replicating the authority that those systems relay. In 2017, her opera project The Ten Murders of Josephine used the space of Witte de With Center for Contemporary Art to spatially stage this Libretto. This exhibition allowed for the staged work to remain unfixed as the additions of the movement of staff and visitors as well as the creation of new objects in space coalesced towards its final production. The next iteration of the work premiered at the Theater Rotterdam in December 2017. With the libretto, Hamadeh returns to an artistic methodology, namely through emotion and poetry, to "explore(s) the workings of testimonial utterance as a means to rethink legal subject hood and to disrupt with that the centrality of citizenship."

== Critical reception ==
Her work has been reviewed in Frieze, Mousse Magazine, Wall Street International, and Ibraaz, among others.

Stephanie Bailey of Ibraz described Hamadeh's 2013 work, Alien Encounters, as "stories, conversations, historical documents and other objects and artifacts – meteorite pieces from various parts of the world, for instance, or various coal scrip tokens used in the American South, as well as a plantation token used in Guatemala – that worked together to produce a networked constellation of meaning and association, united by the themes of hygiene, immunization and quarantine throughout history".

The Institute of Modern Art in Brisbane said of Sleepwalkers, the last chapter of Alien Encounters, "The work’s abstract and non-linear script, its dissonant audio track, and the constant shifting of its characters re-choreographs the power-relations between the persistent image of the female monster, the figure of the state, and colonial violence."

Jesi Khadivi of Frieze, reviewing The Ten Murders of Josephine commented, "For nearly a decade, the Lebanon-born artist’s research- and performance-based practice has questioned the infrastructures of justice, militarism, histories of sanitation and theatre." Khadavi describes the performance as consisting of "a 40-minute sound- and text-based opera, which loops through the building’s dim, violet-lit second floor", noting "processes of translation and reordering articulate a shifting hierarchy of voices. However, such references are layered, distorted and coded beyond comprehension."

Carolina Rito of Mousse Magazine said that Alien Encounters and The Ten Murders of Josephine were focused on "mechanisms of the law and how these mechanisms inform and institutionalize the legal subject". Rito commented that with the "tensions between sound/silence, voice/speech, and legality/illegality" in Hamadeh's work "both polarities inform one another, or, better said, imply and implicate one another".

Wall Street International's review of Ramadeh's The Ten Murders of Josephine described it as "coalescing multiple strands of theoretical research in the largest project in her career to date; one that genuinely engenders new modalities of readership and spectatorship, and tests performative dynamics of exhibition making."

== Selected exhibitions ==
- 2021 secession, Wien
- 2017 Witte de With Center for Contemporary Art in Rotterdam, Sursock Museum, Beirut, Lebanon
- 2016 Institute of Modern Art, Brisbane, The Showroom, London
- 2015 Nottingham Contemporary, Western Front, Vancouver, TPW, Toronto, Moscow Bienniale
- 2014 The New Museum, CCA Wattis Institute, San Francisco, EVA International, Limerick, Liverpool Biennial
- 2013 Lisson Gallery, London, Beirut, Cairo, Witte de With, Rotterdam
- 2011 Van Abbemuseum, Eindhoven
- 2010 Beirut Art Center, Beirut

== Awards ==
In 2017 she received the Prix de Rome, the most generous award for artists in Netherlands. She received a Günther-Peill-Stiftung Fellowship Award (2014–16) and has been in residence at We Are Primary (Nottingham, UK), Flat Time House (London, UK), Townhouse Gallery (Cairo, Egypt) and Bains Connective (Brussels, Belgium).
