= Christodoulos Panayiotou =

Cypriot artist

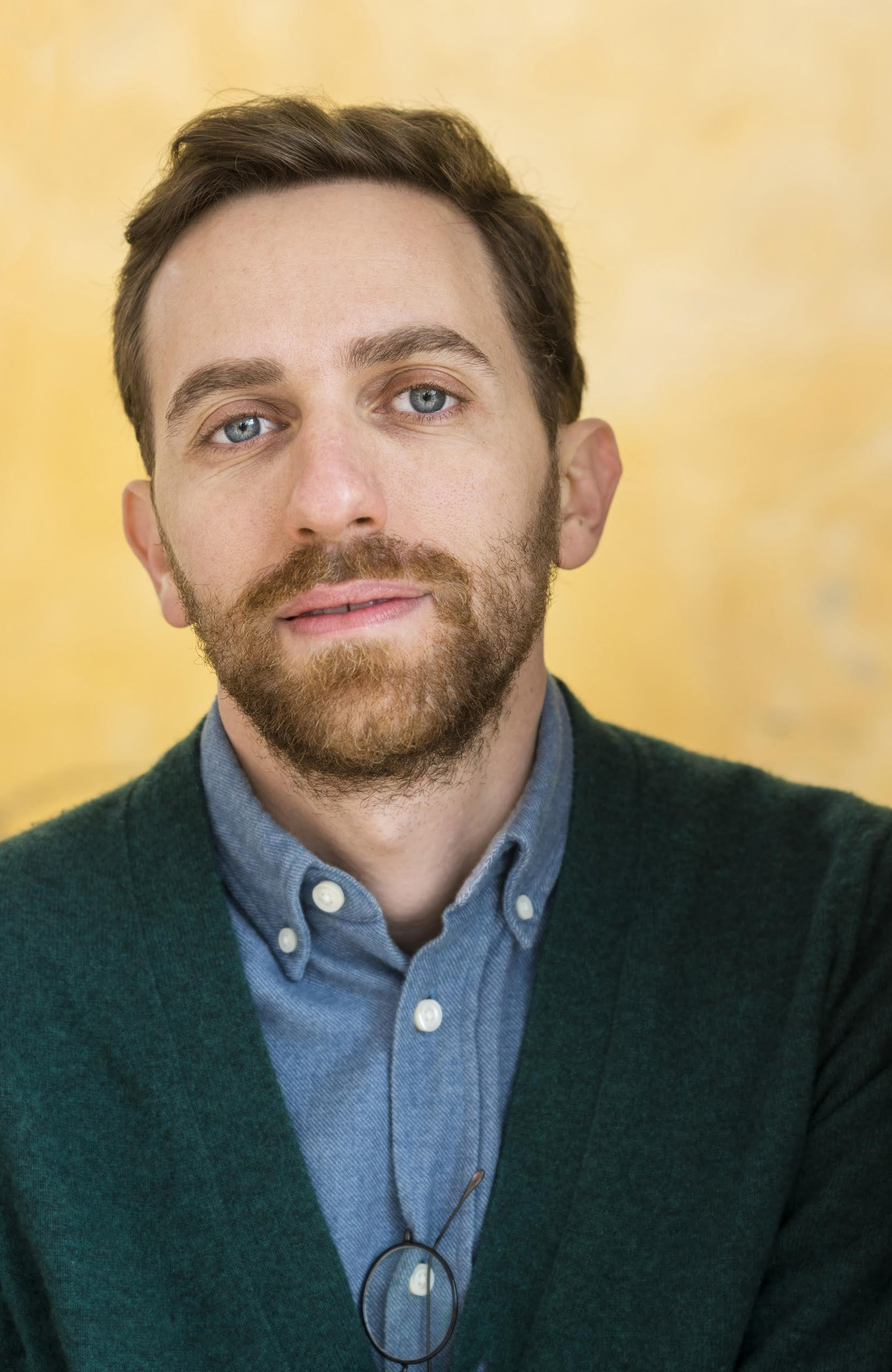
- Born: 1978 (age 47–48); Limassol, Cyprus

Christodoulos Panayiotou (born 1978) is a Cypriot artist. Panayiotou's work spans a wide range of media, including sculpture, painting, installation, performance, photography, and video, and focuses on uncovering hidden narratives in the visual and material records of history and time. Drawing from his training in dance and the performing arts, as well as his studies in history and theatre anthropology, the artist’s work often involves the re-contextualisation of found materials and performance-based interventions.

== Early life ==
Panayiotou was born in 1978 in Limassol, Cyprus.

== Works ==
=== Wonder Land, Never Land, I Land ===
Wonder Land (2008), Never Land (2008) and I Land (2010) form a trilogy of 35mm slide projections that are the product of extensive archival research into the past of the artist’s home country, Cyprus.

Wonder Land comprises eighty photographs from the Limassol carnival taken between 1975 and 2008 and stored in the city’s municipal archives. Through this selection of images, often depicting locals dressed up as Disney characters, the artist explores how the long-established purist narrative of tradition typically used to describe the annual celebration is being increasingly affected by processes of Westernisation and Americanisation. Commenting on Wonder Land, Panayiotou has stated:

“The Limassol carnival parade is a revelation of everything we would like to be, of everything we know we cannot be, and of everything we cannot afford to accept that we are.”

Never Land is a three-channel projection comprising images from the archives of the island's largest daily newspaper, Phileleftheros. The material is from throughout the 1990s, a decade of transition and transformation for Cyprus, as it engaged with the prospect of entering into the European Union. The work functions on the basis of idiosyncratic, personal associations between the images projected in each channel.

In I Land, the final instalment of the trilogy, Panayiotou examines the representation of the first president of Cyprus, Archbishop Makarios III, through photographs taken by the Press and Information Office (PIO) in Nicosia during his seventeen-year presidency. The PIO is a government department that deals with the distribution of official information to the media and the public. Among official photographs of the president kept in the archive, Panayiotou came across seemingly trivial snapshots taken by PIO photographers in the course of their duties. By juxtaposing these images, he uncovers a parallel storyline, told through the eyes of PIO photographers, which both accompanies and challenges the official narrative.

=== Icons ===
In his 2012 exhibition Tenuto at Rodeo, Istanbul, Panayiotou introduced a series of gold-gilded monochrome paintings. The works were produced by infiltrating a pre-existing commercial circuit of production of religious icons, commissioning an iconographer to deploy the customary Byzantine techniques. Bringing forward the golden background as the sole element in the painting, the artist abstracted any form of representation associated with Orthodox iconography. As such, the works take as their point of departure the commodification and commercialisation of Byzantine iconography and plays into iconoclastic historical impulses—a recurring war on icons.

Since the exhibition, gold-gilded monochrome paintings have become central to Panayiotou’s practice in numerous variations. These variants involve processes of abstractification, as well as the reintroduction of formalistic elements (such as the foreground) and geometric shapes (such as the outline of the halo). From 2019 onwards, the series has expanded to include traditional silversmithing and gilding techniques used in the creation of revetments—metal covers that conceal and protect religious icons.

=== Mosaics ===
In the Cyprus Pavilion of the 56th Venice Biennale, Panayiotou showed three mosaic works composed of ancient tesserae. These small fragments were kept in the Archaeological Museum in Nicosia, and, with the collaboration of the Cypriot Department of Antiquities, Panayiotou borrowed them as material for the composition of his wall mosaics. Following the Biennale, the mosaics were taken back to the museum, where the conservation department dismantled them, reverting them to their original state of unidentified tesserae.

Mauvaise Herbes is a series of mosaic works which are the outcome of the artist’s long-standing engagement with the archaeological site of Kourion in Cyprus, which houses the remains of an ancient city-state renowned for its mosaics. In common archaeological practice, some findings are re-buried after they have been excavated and documented for preservation purposes. For this work, Panayiotou documented the mauvaises herbes, or weeds, that grow on the surface of these in-filled archaeological digs, and rendered them on a 1:1 scale as a contemporary mosaic, adopting the same tessellation techniques used to create the antiquities buried beneath them.

=== Pulp paintings ===
In this series of paintings, the artist replaces common paper pulp with pulp made from shredded demonetised banknotes – discarded Euro banknotes, misprinted US dollar bills and obsolete Deutschmark notes. The pulp from the different denominations has been composed and combined into sheets of paper, as separate colour fields or mixtures, using the technique of pulp painting. The notes retain nothing of their original form other than their pigments. By restoring value to devalued matter, the series forms part of Panayiotou’s greater investigations into the notion of value exchange.

=== The Price of Copper ===
The Price of Copper is a series of improvised fountains consisting of a raw sheet of copper sourced from the Skouriotissa copper mines in Xeros, Cyprus. The title of the work is borrowed from Bertolt Brecht’s parable, ‘Der Messingkauf’ (‘Buying Brass’), which tells the story of a client who wishes to buy a trumpet, but is only interested in the metal from which is it made. From this parable, Panayiotou extracted a protocol for a sculpture that addresses the distinction between material value and the added value of goods. The object becomes a fountain, and therefore a sculpture, only when the water is running. As soon as the water stops, the piece turns back into a mere sheet of copper.

=== Theatrical backdrops ===
Folded theatrical backdrops have been an ongoing subject in Panayiotou’s practice since 2007. The act of concealing an image that was made to be displayed on stage involves an abandonment of narrative, evoking feelings of disenchantment and disillusionment towards theatrical traditions.

Some of the backdrops, such as Act I: The Departure, Act II: The Island, Act III: The Glorious Return and Soliloquy: The Sea, involve pre-existing works that were appropriated and renamed to allow for new narrative potentials to arise. Others, such as Nowhere, The Parting Discourse and The End, were produced by the artist, and presented as the sole element in a staged performance. At the Venice Biennale in 2015, for example, The Parting Discourse, a backdrop depicting a horizon, was used in a performance of the same name, intended as an inauguration ceremony for the Cyprus Pavilion. It appeared on stage, slowly descending and collapsing onto itself before being folded and carried to be displayed, like the others, as a concealed image.

=== Restoration paintings ===
For his 2019 solo exhibition, LUX S.1003 334, at the Musée d’Orsay, Panayiotou produced a series of three works, each titled Painting, for which he worked closely with the restoration department of the museum. For these works, pieces of cotton wool used during the restoration and cleaning of the surfaces of the canvases in the collection of the Musée d’Orsay were collected, and the varnish, layers of paint, grime and other undesirable matter were extracted. The extracted material was then used as paint to cover new canvases exhibited alongside the other works in the show.

== Dying on Stage ==
Dying on Stage is an ongoing and ever-growing lecture-performance by Panayiotou that explores the hierarchical order of literal, metaphorical and symbolic deaths on stage, with reflections on the concept of tragic irony being the point of departure. The radical paradigm of death serves here as a narrative to investigate the complex relationship between the actor, the character and the spectator.

Originally, new chapters of Dying on Stage were only presented to friends on the artist’s birthday, however, following an invitation to present it publicly at Serpentine Galleries' Park Nights and in Stromboli, Italy by Fiorucci Art Trust, different versions have been performed in numerous festivals and institutions over the past decade, amongst which are: Festival d’Automne, Paris, France; Festival La Bâtie, Geneva, Switzerland; Kunstenfestivaldesarts, Brussels, Belgium; PERFORMA 15, New York, US; Centre National de la Dance (C ND), Paris, France (on invitation by Jerôme Bel); Onassis Cultural Centre, Athens, Greece; Atelier des Ballets de Monte Carlo at the Nouveau Musée National de Monaco, Monaco; Centre Pompidou, Paris, France; Phenomenon, Anafi, Greece; Sharjah Biennial 13 Act II, STATION, Beirut, Lebanon; Cabaret Voltaire, Zürich, Switzerland; and Conway Hall, London, UK, presented by Camden Arts Centre in collaboration with Serpentine Galleries.

In February–April 2023, Panayiotou toured Dying on Stage, with performances taking place in Switzerland at Théâtre Le Pommier, Neuchâtel, and in France at Festival Parallèle, Mucem, Marseille; le Théâtre de la Vignette, Université Paul-Valéry 3, Montpellier; Malraux. scène nationale Chambéry Savoie, D.A.M.E Festival, Malraux, Chambéry; Ccn (Centre Choréographique National) de Caen en Normandie, Caen; Festival Conversations, Cndc (Centre national de danse contemporaine) Angers, Angers; and Centre national de la dance (CN D) in collaboration with Palais de Tokyo (in the context of EXPOSÉ·ES), Pantin.

Panayiotou continues to add a new chapter to Dying on Stage every year on his birthday. The performance material currently spans over twenty hours, with different versions of between two-to-six hours performed to the public.

== Parallel activities ==
=== The Island Club ===
In 2018, Panayiotou initiated The Island Club, a non-profit exhibition space that hosts exhibitions by local and international artists, as well as film screenings, performances, and readings. The space has featured exhibitions by Pierre Leguillon, Apostolos Georgiou, Eileen Myles, Eric Baudelaire, Koula Savvidou, Jumana Manna, Kara Walker, Thraki Rossidou Jones, Constantin Brancusi, Farah Al Qasimi and Pratchaya Phinthong, among others.

Initially, The Island Club was hosted on the ground floor of the artist’s studio, located in Agora Anexartisias — a shopping arcade built in 1991 in the commercial centre of Limassol. In March 2021, The Island Club moved to a new space inside the arcade in close proximity to the studio.

=== Writing ===
Panayiotou has written several texts, primarily in the form of letters that follow the tradition of epistolary essays. Letters by Panayiotou have been used as press releases in the context of exhibitions; these include January, February, May, June, July, August, September, October, December (Rodeo, Piraeus), I write, erase, rewrite, erase again, and then a poppy blooms (Centre of Contemporary Art Kitakyushu), and False Form (Rodeo, London). Some letters were published in books and catalogues, such as Two Days After Forever: A reader on the Choreography of Time (a book produced to accompany the artist’s exhibition at the 56th Venice Biennale), Letters from Japan, Imeldific by Giovanna Silva, and Neither Nor: The challenge to the Labyrinth (published for the Italian Pavilion at the 58th Venice Biennale).

Panayiotou has been an advisor at the Rijksakademie van beeldende kunsten since 2016.

== Recognition ==
In 2005, Panayiotou was awarded the 4th DESTE Prize from the DESTE Foundation for Contemporary Arts in Athens. In 2011, he received the Future of Europe Prize from the Museum of Contemporary Art in Leipzig. In 2015, The Takis and Louki Nemitsas Foundation awarded him with the Nemitsas Prize in Visual Arts – an annual award dedicated to Cypriot scientists and artists who, through their research and work, bring honour to Cyprus on an international level.

== Exhibitions ==
Panayiotou has exhibited his work in various museums and major exhibition spaces around the world. In 2012, he took part in the thirteenth edition of the quinquennial contemporary art exhibition documenta, with the works The Sea and Independence Street. In 2015, he represented Cyprus at the 56th Venice Biennale with the exhibition Two Days After Forever. In 2019, he collaborated on the conception of the Emma Kunz - Visionary Drawings exhibition at the Serpentine Galleries. To accompany Kunz's works, he created new stone benches from the healing rock AION A which acted as scopic devices from which visitors could contemplate the drawings. In the same year, the artist’s solo shows at the Camden Arts Centre and the Musée d’Orsay received praise in the New York Times article titled 'Best Art of 2019'.

=== Solo exhibitions ===
- One Year, LUMA Arles, Arles, France (2023–ongoing)
- The Portrait of Christopher Atkins, CCCOD (Le Centre de création contemporaine Olivier-Debré), Tours, France (2021)
- LUX S.1003 334, Musée d’Orsay, Paris, France (2019)
- Act II: The Island, Camden Arts Centre, London, UK (2019)
- Mármol Rosa, Casa Luis Barragán, Mexico City, Mexico (2017)
- “I write, erase, rewrite, erase again, and then a poppy blooms”, Centre for Contemporary Art, Kitakyushu, Kitakyushu, Japan (2017)
- Pragmática Contra o Luxo, Lumiar Cité, Lisbon, Portugal (2016)
- Two Days After Forever, The Cyprus Pavilion, 56th Venice Biennale, Venice, Italy (2015)
- Stories from the lives of my friends, Point Centre for Contemporary Art, Nicosia, Cyprus (2015)
- Days and Ages, Moderna Museet, Stockholm, Sweden (2013)
- And, Casino Luxembourg, Luxembourg (2013)
- In the light of day, fireflies are like any other insect, Centre for Contemporary Art, Kitakyushu, Kitakyushu, Japan (2013)
- One Thousand and One Days, Contemporary Art Museum St. Louis, St. Louis, Missouri, USA (2012)
- Christodoulos Panayiotou I: The Price of Copper & II: To Bring Back the World to the World, CAC Brétigny, Brétigny Sur Orge, France (2012)
- Christodoulos Panayiotou, Museum of Contemporary Art Leipzig, Leipzig, Germany (2011)
- Christodoulos Panayiotou, Kunsthalle Zürich, Zürich, Switzerland (2010)

=== Group exhibitions ===
- Between the Sun and the Moon, Lahore Biennale 02, Lahore, Pakistan (2020)
- Le Grand Monnayage, 8th Melle Biennale, Melle, France (2018)
- Stories of Almost Everyone, Hammer Museum, Los Angeles, USA (2018)
- Floating Worlds, 14th Biennale de Lyon, Lyon, France (2017)
- Tamawuj, Sharjah Biennial 13, Sharjah, UAE (2017)
- Cher(e)s Ami(e)s, Centre Pompidou, Paris, France (2016)
- Soleil Politique: The Museum Between Light and Shadow, Museion, Bolzano, Italy (2014)
- Sacre 101: An Exhibition based on the Right of Spring, Migros Museum, Zürich, Switzerland (2014)
- Berlin Biennale 8, Berlin, Germany (2014)
- When Attitudes Become Form Become Attitudes, CCA Wattis Institute for Contemporary Arts, San Francisco, California, USA (2012)
- dOCUMENTA (13), Kassel, Germany (2012)
- The Unexpected Guest, 7th Liverpool Biennial, Liverpool, UK (2012)
- You Are Not Alone, Joan Miro Foundation, Barcelona, Spain (2011)
- The End of Money, Witte de With, Rotterdam, The Netherlands (2011)
- Scene Shifts, Bonniers Konsthall, Stockholm, Sweden (2010)
- Live Cinema/In the Round, Philadelphia Museum of Art, Philadelphia, Pennsylvania, USA (2010)
- Home Works Forum 5, Ashkal Alwan, Beirut, Lebanon (2010)
- The Columns Held Us Up, Artists Space, New York City, New York, USA (2009)
- Convention, Museum of Contemporary Art North Miami, Miami, USA (2009)
