= Thecla Schiphorst =

Canadian media artist and academic (born 1955)

- Born: 1955 (age 69–70)
- Known for: electronic artist, installation artist
- Notable work: Bodymaps, Artifacts of Touch

Thecla Schiphorst (born 1955) is a Canadian digital media artist and academic.

== Work ==
Schiphorst was a founding developer of the dance and choreography software LifeForms, alongside Tom Calvert. Using LifeForms, she collaborated over a long period with the American dancer and choreographer Merce Cunningham.

She is also known for her interactive work Bodymaps: Artifacts of Touch, which near-field and touch sensors to allow the viewer to control a video image of the human form by touching the image.

== Academic career ==
Schiphorst is the Associate Director and an Associate Professor of the School of Interactive Arts and Technology at Simon Fraser University.

== Awards ==
In 1998, Schiphorst was a recipient of the Petro–Canada Award in New Media, administered by the Canada Council.
