= Sarah Naqvi =

Indian textile artist

- Born: Sarah Naqvi; 1996 (age 29–30); Aligarh, Uttar Pradesh, India
- Education: St. Xavier's College, Mumbai

Sarah Naqvi (born 1996) is an Indian contemporary textile artist, who is enrolled in the De Ateliers residency program in Amsterdam, Netherlands. Their work has received international recognition and has been described as subversive. Naqvi's art addresses topics such as gender, sexuality, race, religion, etc., while advocating for various social and feminist causes, including that of body positivity and opposition to menstruation stigma.

Naqvi's embroideries have been featured in various national and international art studios and exhibitions, including two solo exhibitions called Bashaoor (2018) at Clark House in Mumbai, Maharashtra and Sharam o Haya (2019) at Âme Nue in Hamburg, Germany. They also have a large presence on social media platforms, where their work has received widespread praise.

== Early life and education ==
Born in Aligarh, Uttar Pradesh, and raised in suburban Mumbai, Naqvi is an alumna of St. Xavier's College, Mumbai, and a graduate of the National Institute of Design, Ahmedabad. She received "The Phenomenal SHE" award in 2019, jointly granted by the Indian National Bar Association and the National Institute of Design.
