= Myriam Boulos =

Lebanese documentary photographer (born 1992)

- Born: 1992 (age 33–34); Beirut, Lebanon
- Occupations: Documentary photographer and artist
- Known for: Photography

Myriam Boulos (ميريم بولس; born 1992) is a Lebanese documentary photographer and artist. Her work has been published in Vogue, Time, and Vanity Fair, among other publications. She has also participated in numerous international artistic exhibitions.

== Early life and education ==
Boulos was born in 1992 in Beirut, Lebanon. She is a graduate of the Lebanese Academy of Fine Arts with a master's in photography in 2015.

== Artistic career ==
Among Boulos' well-known series are Tenderness (2018–2021), Dead End (2019), Douce Virilite (2017), Sunday, and Nightshift (2015). She has taken part in both national and international exhibitions, such as at Photomed, Beirut Art Fair, Mashreq to Maghreb (Germany), Berlin PhotoWeek (Germany), and Les Jeux de la Francophonie (Cote d'Ivoire), as well as other collective exhibitions in Paris; Amsterdam; Washington, D.C.; San Francisco; New York; Berlin; Ulm; and Italy. In 2019 and 2020, her work was exhibited at the Arab World Institute and Middle East Institute.

Her photographs have featured in numerous national and international news and culture publications, such as Vogue, Time, Les Inrocks, and Vanity Fair. She is well-known for contributing to international reporting on the 2019 protests in Lebanon and 2020 port blast in Beirut, especially for Time Magazine. Her work was included in Time's list of Best Portraits of 2020.

She is currently part of The Gemini Collective, alongside illustrator Michele Standjofski (1960, Beirut) and psychologist Laura-Joy Boulos (1989, Beirut). In addition to photography, Boulos collaborates on and is a co-founder of the Beirut-based bilingual feminist magazine Al Hayya.

=== Awards ===
Boulos was the recipient of the Byblos Bank Award for Photography (Purple Lens Award) in 2014. Her first solo exhibition took place in 2015. She also became a nominee with Magnum Photos in late 2021.

== Exhibitions ==
=== Solo exhibitions ===
- Dead End." 2019, Institut Francais du Liban, Beirut

=== Group exhibitions ===
- 'IT’S LEBANON’S ANARCHY THAT BOTHERS YOU'. 2020, Galerie Charraudeau, Paris, France.
- Lebanon Then and Now: Photography from 2006 to 2020. July 13, 2020 – October 6, 2020, MEI Art Gallery, San Francisco, CA.
- Close Enough: New Perspectives from 12 Women Photographers of Magnum. September 29, 2022–January 9, 2023, International Center of Photography, New York, New York.
