= Malala Andrialavidrazana =

Malagasy visual artist (born 1971)

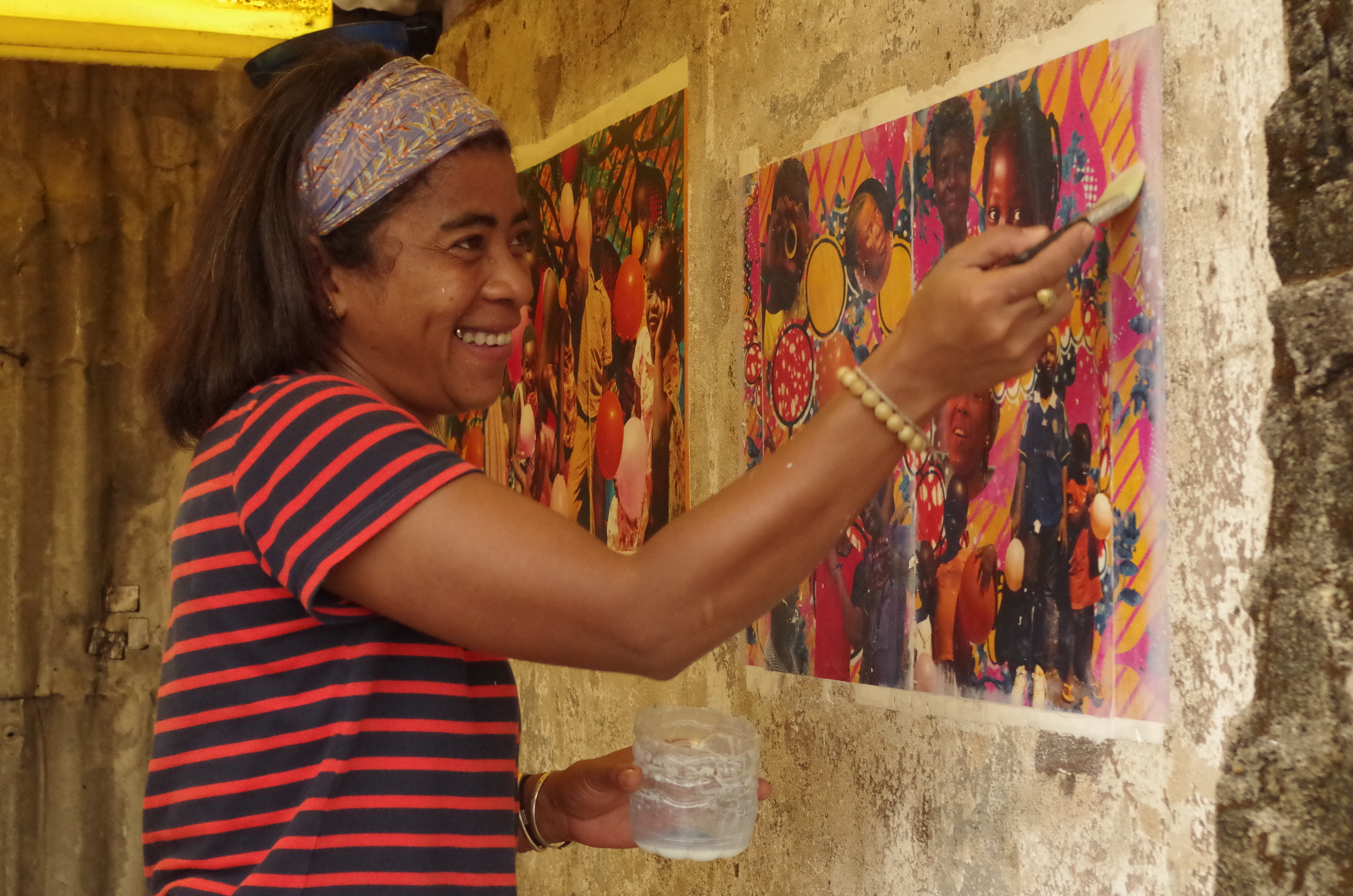
- Andrialavidrazana in 2013
- Born: 1971; Antananarivo, Madagascar
- Known for: Photography, photomontage, collage
- Website: andrialavidrazana.com

Malala Andrialavidrazana (born 1971) is an artist and photographer from Madagascar, who lives in Paris. She has worked and exhibited internationally, and had two books of her photography published.

== Biography ==
Andrialavidrazana moved to Paris in the early 1980s, and graduated from École nationale supérieure d'architecture de Paris-La Villette in 1996. After graduating, she started working in the Parisian art scene, taking a range of jobs, including directing art galleries.

Some ten-year later, she began a career as an artist by extending her graduate investigation of Madagascan burial architecture to cities throughout the Global South, including Auckland, Buenos Aires, Guangzhou, and Santiago. Her resulting d’Outre-Monde series, reflecting on funereal traditions and urban architecture, and showing "funerary customs at the boundaries of nature and culture," was awarded the Prix HSBC pour la Photographie in 2004. It was published in book form by Actes Sud. In 2005, the series appeared in the Bamako Biennale, this being the first of what would be many exhibitions in Africa.

In 2011, she shot the photographic series Ny Any Aminay in Madagascar. For this series, the she was invited into the homes of several families to take pictures of their interiors.

She was sponsored by the Institut Français and the National Arts Council of South Africa through the France-South Africa Seasons 2012 & 2013 programme for a project entitled Echoes (from Indian Ocean), exploring the homes of families from India, Réunion, and South Africa. A book of this series was published by Kehrer Verlag in 2013.

Andrialavidrazana's show at the Caroline Smulders gallery in 2019 featured digitally collaged and over-painted works that take maps and bank notes as a starting point to revisit the visual heritage of the colonial period. Her Figures 1842, Specie degli animali (2018) was sold during the preview of Art Paris for €17,000.

== Books ==
- d’Outre-Monde (2004) ISBN 2-7427-4955-1 – a photographic study of funeral customs around the world, with photographs taken during an expedition to South America, Asia and Oceania in 2003.ISBN 978-2742749553
- Echoes (from Indian Ocean) (2013) ISBN 978-3-86828-454-6

== Selected exhibitions ==
- 9th Lagos Photo Festival (Nigeria, 2018)
- Fondation Clément in Le François (Martinique, 2018)
- 1:54 African Art Fair (UK, 2017)
- Le Muséum d’Histoire Naturelle (France, 2016)
- Fondation Donwahi (Ivory Coast, 2016)
- Bamako Encounters (Mali, 2005/2015)
- Théâtre National de Chaillot (France, 2015)
- New Church Museum (South Africa, 2014)
- La Maison Rouge (France, 2014)
- SUD Triennial (Cameroon, 2013)
- Gulbenkian Foundation (Portugal/France, 2013)
- SAVVY (Germany, 2013)
- Focus Mumbai (India, 2013)
- Biennale Bénin (Benin, 2012)
- KZNSA - KwaZulu Natal Society of Arts (South Africa, 2012)
- Tiwani (UK, 2012)
- DIPE (China, 2011)
- Baudoin Lebon, (Paris, 2010)
- Pan African Festival (Algiers, 2009)
- UCCA (China, 2008)
- Centrale Electrique (Belgium, 2007)
- Rencontres d’Arles (France, 2007)
- Herzliya Museum (Israel, 2007)
- Force de l’art (France, 2006)
- Baudoin Lebon, (Paris, 2004)
