= Emilie Louise Gossiaux =

American artist

- Born: 1989 (age 36–37); Metairie, Louisiana, U.S.
- Education: Cooper Union; Yale University
- Website: emiliegossiaux.com

Emilie Louise Gossiaux (born 1989) is an American multidisciplinary artist who lives and works in New York City. They create drawings, ceramics, and installations.

Gossiaux's work engages with themes of interdependence and the entanglements of humans and animals, in conversation with the scholarship of Donna Haraway and recent work in disability studies. A 2022 Brooklyn Rail review of their exhibition Significant Otherness described Gossiaux's sculptures and drawings as "...shot through with the radical intimacy that accompanies recognition of our mutual enmeshment." They have been recognized with numerous awards. In 2023, Gossiaux and Georgina Kleege held a public conversation on their work. Institutions where their work has been shown include the Whitney Museum, MoMA PS1, the Queens Museum, SculptureCenter, Kunsthall Trondheim, and the Museum Für Moderne Kunst, Frankfurt.

== Life ==
Gossiaux was born in Metairie, Louisiana, near New Orleans, and raised in the nearby suburb of Terrytown. They became interested in art at a young age, but in high school they preferred printmaking and etching to drawing. They began losing their hearing at age of five, which worsened as they grew older. In May 2010, Gossiaux underwent an operation to receive a cochlear implant.

In October 2010, Gossiaux was hit by a truck while riding their bicycle in Brooklyn, resulting in cardiac arrest, a stroke, and multiple fractures in their head, pelvis and leg. Initially unresponsive at Bellevue Hospital, medical staff told their parents they would most likely not recover. However, Gossiaux became responsive over a month after the accident, and was transferred to the NYU Langone Medical Center’s Rusk Institute of Rehabilitation Medicine. The crash left them blind. The story of their recovery was profiled in a 2011 Radiolab episode which has been recognized for its storytelling and emotional impact. Gossiaux's description of being in a coma had an impact on Ira Glass. In 2016, during their recovery, they were profiled on the Today show.

Gossiaux went on to graduate from Cooper Union in 2014 with a BFA, and began attending graduate school at Yale University in 2017, where they graduated with an MFA in sculpture in 2019.

To adapt to losing their sight, they received 11 months of rehabilitation training at BLIND Incorporated in Minneapolis. During their training, they began working with clay as a medium.

They consider themselves to be a disability rights activist.

== Work ==
Many of Gossiaux's sculptures and drawings feature their guide dog London, with whom they have "an interdependent relationship that crisscrosses between maternal, spousal, emotional, and practical." In an Art in America interview, Gossiaux describes their drawings as "giving [London, their dog] a kind of agency, and in daily life, she gives me agency too." Since 2020, Gossiaux has not made any art depicting humans besides themself and their partner, Kirby.

In an interview with The Paris Review, Gossiaux calls their process of drawing a "tactile experience". They keep a ballpoint pen pressed against the paper and are able to feel the impression left behind by the pen. Gossiaux has described the imagery in their work as "mainly from touch memories, for example, the feeling of London's tongue on my hand, or the feeling of her claws on my foot".

Gossiaux was a recipient of the Jerome Foundation Fellowship for Emerging Artists at the Queens Museum for the 2022-2023 year. They were a 2024 recipient of the Joan Mitchell Fellowship.

=== Exhibitions ===
Gossiaux's previous solo shows include After Image at False Flag Gallery (2018) and Memory of a Body at Mother Gallery Beacon (2020).

In 2020, Gossiaux's work was included in the exhibition In Practice: Total Disbelief at SculptureCenter.

In 2021, Gossiaux's sculpture piece Dancing with London (2021) was included in the exhibition Crip Time at the Museum für Moderne Kunst in Frankfurt, Germany.

In 2023, Gossiaux received their first institutional solo-show at the Queens Museum, titled Other-Worlding. That same year, they contributed several ceramic pieces to Finnegan Shannon’s exhibition "Don’t Mind if I Do" at the Museum of Contemporary Art Cleveland.

In 2024, Gossiaux had their first European solo-show, titled Kinship, at Kunsthall Trondheim.

In 2026, Gossiaux was included in the Whitney Biennial.
