= Tabita Rezaire =

Guyanese and Danish artist, therapist and yoga teacher

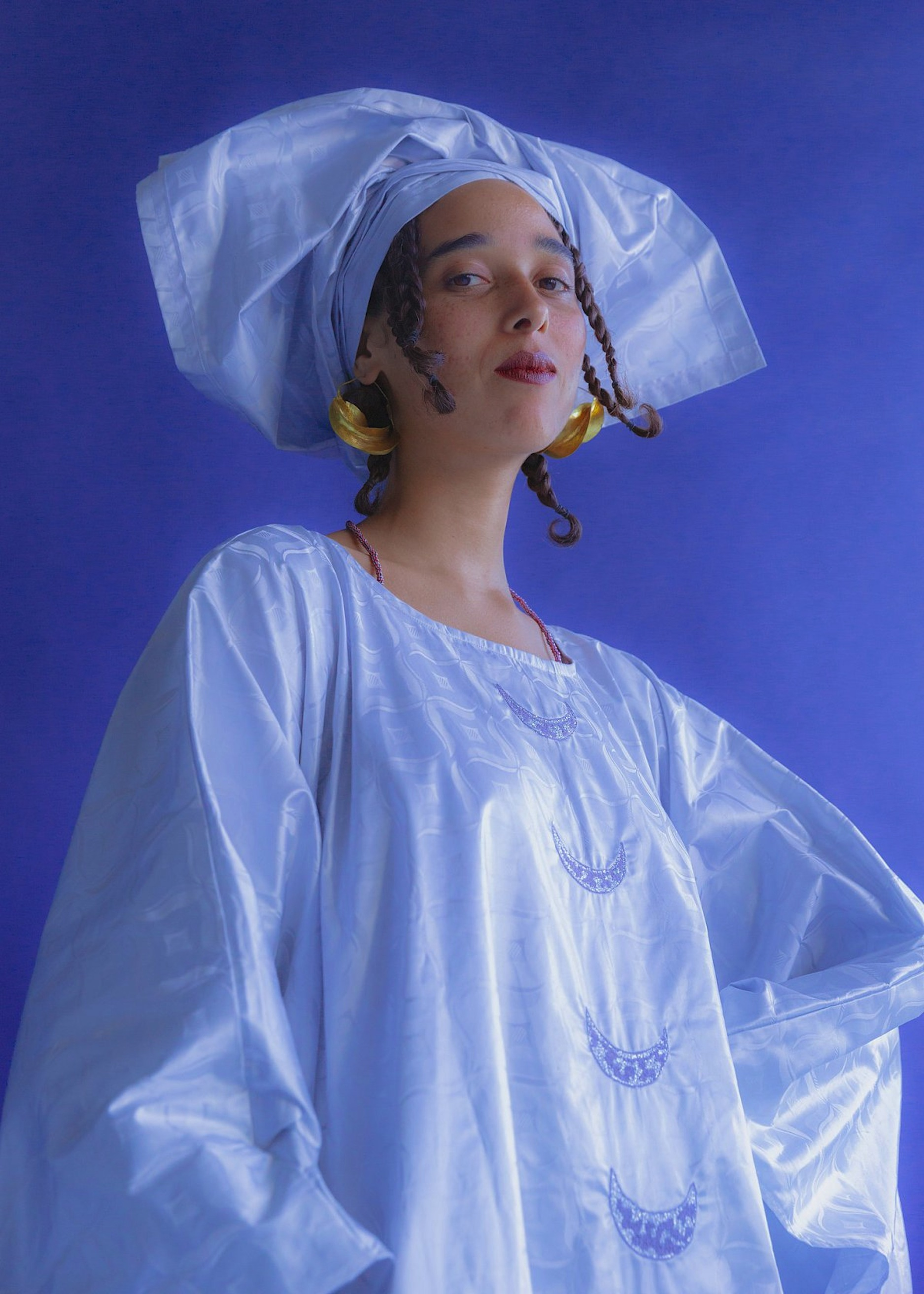
- Occupations: Artist, Yoga Teacher, Therapist
- Writing career
- Period: 2015–present
- Website: tabitarezaire.com

Tabita Rezaire (born 1989, France) is a French new media artist of French Guianese and Danish descent, "health-tech-political" therapist, and "kemetic" and kundalini yoga teacher. She has presented her work at the Goodman Gallery in Johannesburg, Arebyte Gallery, London, the Athens Bienniale, MAXXI, Rome, and Artspace, Sydney. Her book is Conscience u.terre.ine. (2022)

== Biography ==
Tabita Rezaire grew up in Paris and studied economics there for her BA, at Paris Dauphine University, doing her final year at Copenhagen Business School in Denmark. She travelled to London, to study fashion and ended up doing a master's degree in research in artist moving Image at the Central Saint Martins College of Art and Design. She then lived in Paris, Mozambique, and Johannesburg from 2014 through at least 2018.

In 2017, she was welcomed in residence by MeetFactory in Prague, where she began working with sound. She trained in the use of gongs. As of 2021, she is based in Cayenne, French Guiana.

== Work ==
Rezaire produces videos and digital works in which she frequently includes herself. The body is considered a technology in her work. Many of her works deal with concepts of race, intersectional politics and Afro-feminism.

Rezaire's video work Afro Cyber Resistance (2014) denounces the Western-centric nature of the Internet, and the form of white supremacism that is exercised through network control. It describes the Internet, like the world around it, as "exploitative, discriminatory, classist, patriarchal, racist, homophobic, coercive and manipulative". Rezaire viewed it a "a pamphlet and a call for the decolonisation of the internet."

Her first solo exhibition, Exotic Trade, was held in 2017 at the Goodman Gallery in Johannesburg. In it she showed Sugar Walls Teardown, Hoetep Blessings (both, 2016) and the Inner Fire series (2016–17), which included videos, an installation, and digitally produced self-portraits. She described the experience:

It was a beautiful experience to be given space and the means to exhibit a body of work that had animated me for years. It was very healing for myself: These works were transformational for me. In the process, I realised how disconnected I was from my body. It was hard to accept as I'm very sensual, tactile and confident in my sexuality, always dancing and moving. Yet, I discovered that I was completely disconnected from my body—I didn't know where my emotions were. I could tell stories of my hurts, but when asked, "So where do you feel this?" I didn't know. My work was also a journey of reestablishing a connection, a conversation, and also compassion with what is stored in the body, using the body as the technology that it is—to ultimately merge myself with the divine within me.

Rezaire's work has been exhibited extensively including at Arebyte Gallery, London, 2019; Athens Bienniale, 2018; MAXXI, Rome; and Artspace, Sydney. In 2026, Rezaire was one of 111 artists invited by the late curator Koyo Kouoh to be a part of the 61st edition of the Venice Biennale.

=== Other works ===
- Peaceful Warrior, 2015
- Sugar Walls Teardom, 2016
- Deep Down Tidal, 2017
- Premium Connect, 2017

== Collaborations ==
She works with Alicia Mersy in the artists duo Malaxa, based in Johannesburg and Tel Aviv. She is also a founding member of SENEB as well as the Johannesburg-based collective NTU, with Bogosi Sekhukhuni and Nolan Oswald Dennis. The latter group presented African plants that allowed viewers access to one's ancestors at Auto Italia in London. NTU also hosts an online platform with one access station in Seoul.

== See also ==
- Afrofuturism
- Cyberfeminism
