= Ulla West =

Swedish artist

Ulla West (born 1954 in Trollhättan) is a Swedish artist who lives and works in Stockholm.

West lived in Trollhättan until 1973, when she moved to Gothenburg to study North Germanic languages and literary studies. She later studied at Konstfack in Stockholm. She also spent parts of her childhood in Krokom.

In 2009, she was invited to show in the exhibition "Irreverent, Contemporary Nordic Crafts Art" in San Francisco at Yerba Buena Center for the Arts, YBCA. She participated in exhibitions at Hallwylska Palatset 2009 and the exhibition Cut my legs off and call me shorty! at Tensta Konsthall in 2009.

== Publications ==
- Om en robot (About a robot), Mormor Publishers, Stockholm (2008)
