= Sin Wai Kin =

Canadian visual artist

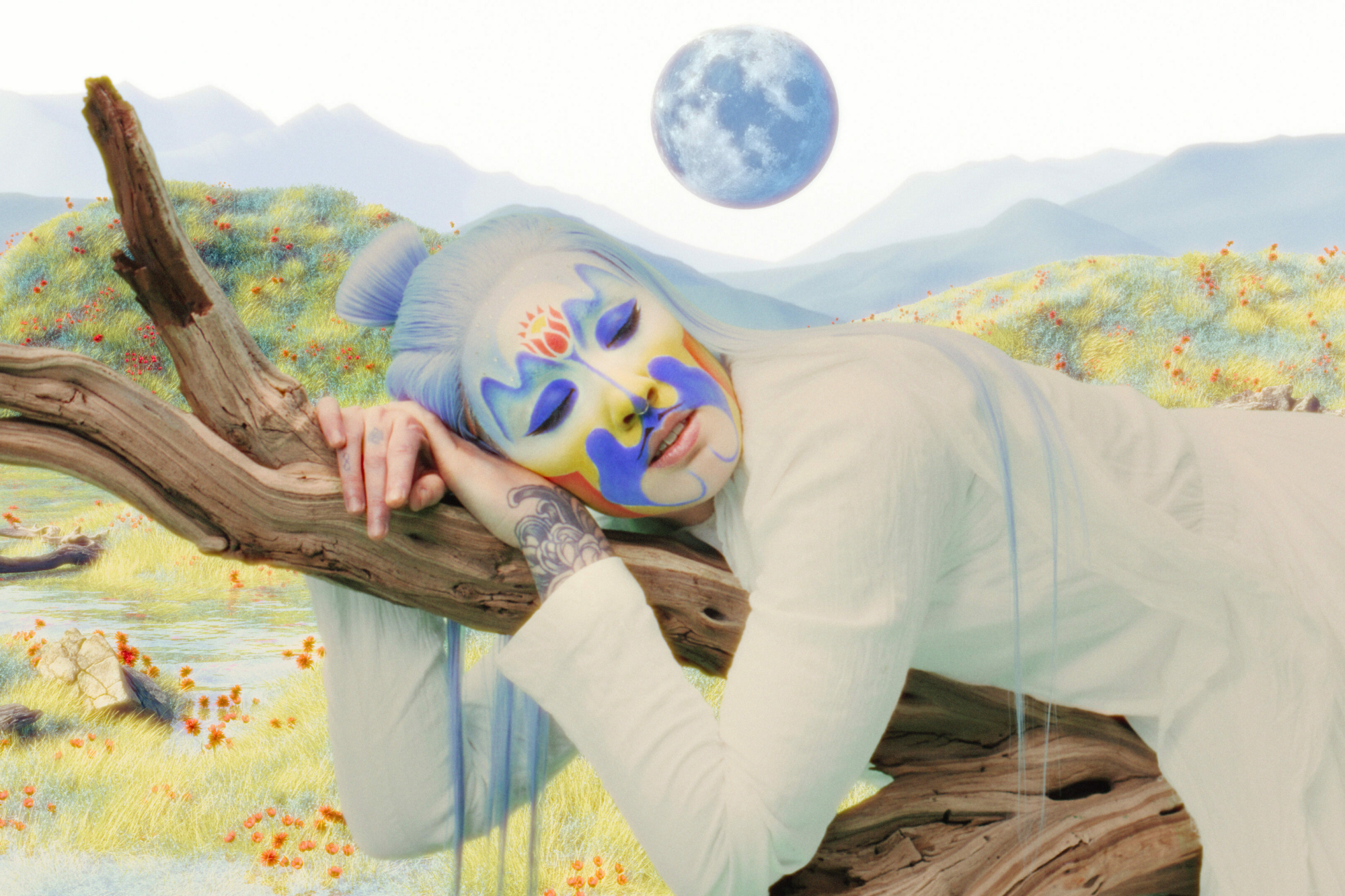
Sin Wai Kin, The Universe (2023)

Sin Wai Kin (Chinese 單慧乾) is a multimedia artist, filmmaker, writer, and performer based in London. Their works include “A Dream of Wholeness in Parts”, “Dreaming the End”, “The Breaking Story”, “The Time of Our Lives”, “The Fortress”, “It’s Always You”, and “Portraits”. They are known for their immersive use of fantasy and speculative fiction to create worlds and characters that reflect on language, reality, time, identity, and duality.

They were nominated for the Turner Prize, the Film London Jarman Award, received the Baloise Art Prize, and screened their work at the BFI London Film Festival. Born in 1991 in Toronto, Sin studied Drawing at Camberwell College of Arts and Print at The Royal College of Art.
