= Audrey Samson =

Canadian multidisciplinary artist

Audrey Samson is a Canadian multidisciplinary artist and researcher whose work points to the materiality of data and its consequences. She is largely known for her exploration of erasure as a means of knowledge production through digital data funerals.

Samson studied Media Design at the Piet Zwart Institute, where she obtained a MFA in 2007.

Together with Sabrina Basten, she co-founded Roger10-4. Their work was featured in Arte, NRK, and Motherboard. She has been an active member of the networked performance group aether9, and the feminist tech network Genderchangers. Samson is also known by the pseudonym ideacritik, and is part of the duo FRAUD, where she collaborates with the artist Fran Gallardo.

Samson's Dust2Seed project was proposed to memorialise a deceased person by encoding their personal data as DNA that would be synthesised and grafted into the DNA of a seedling, so a tree would grow embodying the deceased person's data.

== Interviews ==
- Museums Journal Interview
- 'Digital Data Funerals' in Behind The Smart World.
- 'When I go' in This is not a piece of me. Interview by Lisa Matzi. (print)
- 'Hackin' some coils into wearables'.
