= Hannah Ryggen =

Norwegian artist (1894–1970)

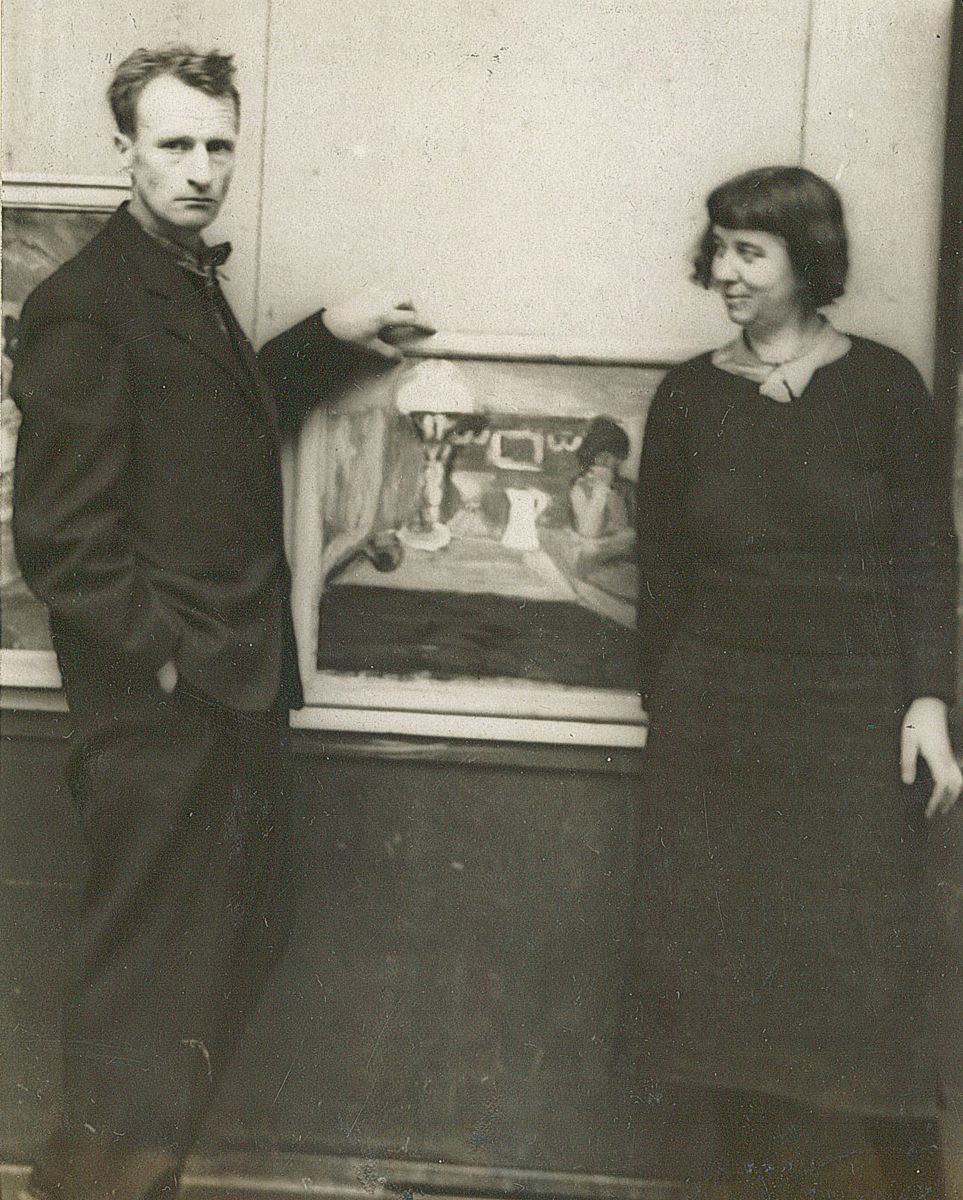
- Hannah Ryggen (right) and Hans Ryggen about 1935-1940
- Born: Hannah Jönsson; 21 March 1894; Malmö, Sweden
- Died: 2 February 1970 (aged 75); Trondheim, Norway
- Occupation: Textile artist
- Spouse: Hans Ryggen
- Children: Mona Ryggen-Granholm (1924–2005)

Hannah Ryggen (nee Jönsson; 21 March 1894 – 2 February 1970) was a Swedish-born Norwegian textile artist. Self-trained, she worked on a standing loom constructed by her husband, the painter Hans Ryggen. She lived on a farm on a Norwegian Fjord and dyed her yarn with local plants.

== Career ==
Hannah Ryggen was a pacifist who subscribed to Scandinavian feminist and leftist journals, and was active in the Norwegian Communist Party and international workers' movements. She paid close attention to the rise of fascism in Europe, and made work in direct response to it.

According to curator Marta Kuzma, although Ryggen "shared and affinity with Käthe Kollwitz, who also selected as her narrative the social, spiritual, and political disorder of her time, Ryggen bypassed Kollwitz's tendency to draft allegorical figures (such as Black Anna) and instead identified historical individuals who forged, installed, and enabled the totalitarian regime in those years – Mussolini, Hitler, Göring, Quisling, Churchill, and the Norwegian writer Knut Hamsun."

Her 1935 tapestry 'Etiopia' (Ethiopia) was triggered by Mussolini's invasion of the African country. It was shown at the Norwegian Pavilion at the Paris World's Fair in 1937, next to Pablo Picasso's Guernica (1937) at the Spanish Pavilion. Etiopia was also shown in 1939 at the New York World's Fair, but there was a cloth covering the part of the scene with a spear piercing through Mussolini's head.

In 1936 she wove one tapestry called 'Hitlerteppet' (The Hitler Carpet), with two decapitated figures kneeling before a hovering cross, and one called 'Drømmedød' (Death of Dreams) depicting prisoners and murderous Nazis in a concentration camp.

Ryggen created about one hundred large tapestries in her lifetime. Following the formal traditions of 17th and 18th century Norwegian folk textile arts, her works combine figurative and abstract elements.

Her 'Henders bruk' from 1949 was the first textile artwork acquired by the National Gallery of Norway.

Twenty eight of her works were shown in a solo show at the Moderna Museet in Stockholm in 1962, and she was the first female Norwegian artist to be represented at the Venice Biennale, in 1964. In 2012 a selection of her woven works were included in dOCUMENTA (13) in Kassel.

== Exhibitions ==
- Moderna Museet, Stockholm (1962)
- Venice Biennial (1964)
- Kunsthall Oslo (2011)
- documenta (13) (2012)
- Nasjonalgalleriet. "Hannah Ryggen. Verden i veven" (2015)
- Modern Art Oxford Hannah Ryggen: Woven Histories (2017)
- Schirn Kunsthalle Frankfurt (2019)

== Works ==
- "Petter Dass" (1940)

== Collections ==
- County Museum of Gävleborg, Gävle, Sweden
- National Museum, Oslo, Norway
- National Museum of Decorative Arts and Design, Trondheim, Norway

== Literature ==
- Marit Paasche. Hannah Ryggen - en fri (2016)
- Marit Paasche (Editor), Esther Schlicht (Editor). Hannah Ryggen: Woven Manifestos Prestel Publishing (2019) ISBN 9783791359267
- Marit Paasche. Hannah Ryggen: Threads of Defiance University of Chicago Press (2019) ISBN 022667469X

== Other sources ==
- Næss, Inga Elisabeth. "Hannah Ryggen". In Helle, Knut. Norsk biografisk leksikon (in Norwegian). Oslo: Kunnskapsforlaget. Retrieved 18 October 2014.
- Opstad, Jan-Lauritz. "Hannah Ryggen". In Godal, Anne Marit. Store norske leksikon (in Norwegian). Oslo: Norsk nettleksikon. Retrieved 18 October 2014.
- Paasche, Marit. "Hannah Ryggen and the Fabric of Society". In 'MacGuffin Magazine', 1 December 2020
