= Athens Biennale =

Exhibition of international contemporary art

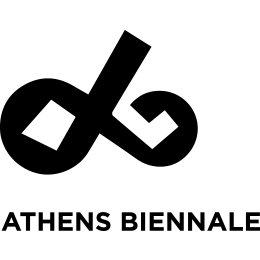
Logo

The Athens Biennale (abbr. AB) is an international cultural event held every two years at various locations in Athens, consisting of a large-scale exhibition and a diverse programme of side events, such as performances, workshops, lectures etc. It is one of the largest international art events of contemporary culture in Greece and it has been acknowledged as one of the most significant and innovative cultural initiatives in Europe by the European Cultural Foundation (2015 ECF Princess Margriet Award for Culture).

It is organised by the Athens Biennial Non-Profit Organization, which was co-founded by Xenia Kalpaktsoglou, Poka-Yio, and Augustine Zenakos in November 2005 and was also co-directed by them until 2011. Xenia Kalpaktsoglou and Poka-Yio served as co-directors until 2016 and from then until today it is directed by Poka-Yio.

The Athens Biennale functions as an observatory of collective issues and as a platform for the designation of the contemporary culture of the Athenian metropolis within an international network of large-scale periodic contemporary art events. Each edition is defined by a different concept and curatorial team, tapping out the political zeitgeist and highlighting contemporary issues relating both to the international and the local sociocultural context. Since the 1st edition “Destroy Athens” to the latest “ANTI”, AB promotes experimental formats and various curatorial approaches and connects the local artistic production with the international art scene of contemporary art.

The Athens Biennale has contributed to the establishment of Athens as a major cultural destination for contemporary art, on a par with the biggest capitals of Europe. Up to now, it has presented six editions under which over 800 artists and theorists, international and Greek, have participated, and more than 127 new art productions have been commissioned or premiered. AB has attracted more than 315.000 visitors from Greece and abroad, including thousands of art professionals and international journalists.

== Editions ==
- AB1: DESTROY ATHENS (2007)
- AB2: HEAVEN (2009)
- AB3: MONODROME (2011)
- AB4: AGORA (2013)
- AB5to6: OMONOIA (June 2015 – February 2017)
- AB6: ANTI (2018)
- AB7: ECLIPSE (Spring 2021)

== European Biennial Network ==
The Athens Biennale founded the European Biennial Network (EBN) in 2007, a collaborative structure aiming to promote dialogue, interaction and collaboration between contemporary art Biennials in Europe. EBN intends to use the knowledge, experience and wealth of information accumulated by organisers of large-scale periodic art events in order to support the communication and mobility of artists and art professionals.

== 2015 Princess Margriet Award for Culture ==
In 2015, the Athens Biennale has been chosen by the ECF (European Cultural Foundation) for the Princess Margriet Award for Culture for its work building on the public sphere, creating sorely needed open space for artistic imagination, as well as for its cultural contribution in creating a democratic Europe.

As the European Cultural Foundation refers:

“Athens Biennale has re-imagined the model of the biennale as a space for cultural debate and grassroots organising in contemporary Greece. It has reinvented the art biennale as a structure that enables new forms of solidarity between local and international cultural communities and wider civic engagement. The most recent biennale in 2013 was organised in the format of an Agora, which in ancient times referred to a gathering space that had overlapping social, business and political uses. The biennale took an innovative collective curatorial approach that breaks radically from a consumer-oriented model of exhibition-making. Faced with severe funding cuts, the Athens Biennale proves the power of self-organisation and building common ground through culture.”

== AB1: DESTROY ATHENS (2007) ==
The first edition of the Athens Biennale, titled “Destroy Athens”, was presented in 2007. The exhibition was curated by XYZ (the curatorial alias of Xenia Kalpaktsoglou, Poka-Yio and Augustine Zenakos) and it took place in Technopolis, City of Athens, from September 10 to December 2, 2007, with the participation of a total of 110 artists. Twenty-five new works of art were produced by the 1st Athens Biennale, while several works had their world or European premieres in Athens. Moreover, a series of parallel exhibitions, screenings and live events took place in the surrounding area of the main exhibition venue.

Within the framework of the 1st Athens Biennale, a few additional activities were also held prior to the exhibition, such as the international conference “Prayer for (Passive?) Resistance”, which took place in the Old Parliament of Athens on February 17 & 18, 2007, as well as two online projects: artwave radio, an artist-run online radio station that provided a live audio arena for original audio art projects, interviews, talks and sound recordings created specifically to be broadcast, and a. the Athens contemporary art review, a monthly bilingual online magazine with theoretical essays, exhibition reviews, interviews and book reviews.

DESTROY ATHENS was an attempt to challenge the ways in which identities and behaviors are determined through stereotypical descriptions. The notion of Athens – as the archetypal city that has become emblematic in terms of stereotypes – was used as a metaphor for this feeling of extra-determination or entrapment that the stereotype inflicts upon the personal sense of identity and social behavior. DESTROY ATHENS aimed to function as a progression through various themes, where elements contradict, collide or cancel-out each other constantly. Successive realizations and disillusionments make up a fragmented acknowledgement of a dead-end, a kind of world, a dystopic environment of conceptual Waste Lands.

“DESTROY ATHENS tells a story. A story about ruptures and dead ends, which emerges from a completely empirical observation: we, each one of us, the subject of every action and every conscience is built through the eyes of others. What is important is that it is not being constructed by others — it is all an internal affair: the subject builds its own self, but its building material is the perception of others. And this fact is the precondition of any recognition, collectivity, connection, participation, sense of community. This precondition is a necessity, but at the same time that the subject feels it, lives it and depends on it, it will never accept it: we never want to be what we are; we claim the right not to be what we are. Rupture is constantly lurking in the possibility of claiming refusal: at every instant, we are entitled to deny the precondition of collectivity and abolish any connection or relationship. The story is divided in six chapters or “days” after the Six Days of Creation.” –XYZ [Excerpt from the curatorial text]

== AB2: HEAVEN (2009) ==
The second edition of the Athens Biennale, titled “Heaven”, was conceived as a multifaceted contemporary art festival that extended along the coastline of Athens. It was held in open and closed spaces along the Athenian coastline of Palaio Faliro, including the coastline promenade and the surrounding park along with the Floisvos building, from June 15 to October 4, 2009. The main venue was the Olympic properties building in Plateia Nerou, used for the first time since 2004.

XYZ (Xenia Kalpaktsoglou, Poka-Yio, Augustine Zenakos), the founders and artistic directors of the Athens Biennale, invited an eclectic group of art professionals to contemplate the subject of HEAVEN. The multiple visual art and performative interventions in the public spaces were curated by choreographer and stage director Dimitris Papaioannou and visual artist Zafos Xagoraris, while a series of exhibitions, installations, public interventions and projects were curated by Chus Martínez, chief curator of MACBA (Barcelona) at the time, and independent curators Cay Sophie Rabinowitz, Nadja Argyropoulou, Christopher Marinos and Diana Baldon. A rich programme of screenings, performances and music events/concerts complemented the exhibitions lasting through the summer.

HEAVEN as a wide topic touched upon notions such as lost innocence, nature and ecology, utopias and ideal communities. From that premise, a dialogue began which reflected upon the theme itself as well as the methodology surrounding large-scale periodical exhibitions. The six exhibitions of the 2nd Athens Biennale took the form of autonomous approaches to that broad subject which nevertheless communicated creatively and claimed a degree of narrative cohesion.

“They say a human body becomes lighter by twenty-one grams, once it has ceased living. This is how much a soul weighs. Although no science would confirm this, and although not all people believe that God ever breathed on Adam, most of them probably feel at one point or another that there must somehow be an ‘essence’ of life, something more than a mere body, something that encapsulates all that we are.

This therefore then becomes a metaphor for the intangible, that which is there and makes something be more than a sum of its parts, but can never be isolated, never separated as an ingredient. Thus ‘soul’ is what we have left when everything else is gone, ‘soul’ is what can carry us through seemingly insurmountable difficulty, ‘soul’ is what makes music more than a string of disparate sounds, a performance more than an articulation of actions. Far more than a religious notion, ‘soul’ may represent our belief in everything that matters, everything that deserves to continue.”

–XYZ [Notes on the Exhibition Concept]

== AB3: MONODROME (2011) ==
The third edition of the Athens Biennale, titled “Monodrome”, was curated by renowned curator and art theorist Nicolas Bourriaud and the curatorial duo X&Y (Xenia Kalpatsoglou and Poka-Yio). It took place in various venues around Athens from October 23 to December 11, 2011. The largest part of the exhibition as well as a diverse programme of live events, performances, workshops and lectures were hosted in Diplareios School. The exhibition was also hosted in a complex of venues and museums at Eleftherias Park (Park of Liberty), including the Arts Centre and the Eleftherios Venizelos Museum, focal sites of Modern Greek history.

The 3rd Athens Biennale 2011 MONODROME was considered the final part of a trilogy which started with DESTROY ATHENS 2007 and continued with HEAVEN 2009. It was drawn upon the life and work of Walter Benjamin and inspired by his book by the same title (One-Way Street, 1928). MONODROME is a narrative broadcasting from historical venues in the centre of Athens and articulating an imaginary dialogue between The Little Prince and Walter Benjamin. As the intellectual retreats defeated in the face of the escalated distress, the Little Prince keeps questioning this condition with the disarming innocence and the plainspoken boldness of a child.

MONODROME was being realized despite the Crisis that affects Greece heavily. Produced in a state of emergency, and through the synergy of all participants and a large group of volunteers, MONODROME assembled the diverse pieces of an exploratory puzzle, addressing the “here and now”. At the same time the exhibition attempted to question historical narratives that have functioned as dictums of the Greek sociopolitical and aesthetic identity and resulted in the country's perennial suspension between a ‘before’ (tradition) and an ‘after’ (modernization). Being usually perceived and promoted as an emblematic city, Athens today is the epicentre of the Greek upheaval, a place of massive demonstrations and public discussions.

The 3rd Athens Biennale consisted of three intertwined modes: the MONODROME exhibition & projects, the MONODROME Debate, an ongoing body of lectures, interviews, discussions and performative presentations that took place at the auditorium of Diplareios School, and the MONODROME online Channel, an online platform that was transmitting (a) the ongoing documentation of the MONODROME exhibitions and time based events and (b) the MONODROME Debate programme. Furthermore, a series of exhibitions and events organized by cultural institutions, museums and galleries in Athens were included in MONODROME Parallel Events.

== AB4: AGORA (2013) ==
The fourth edition of the Athens Biennale, titled “Agora”, was held from October 28 to December 11, 2013 at the former Athens Stock Exchange. AB4 was curated, produced and realized by a nameless and ephemeral group of artists, curators, theorists and practitioners in the creative industries. AGORA was thus a collective experiment, the result of a process of fermentation between professionals from different backgrounds. What mattered most to those who participated in such an experiment is a shared sense of responsibility and an urge to co-produce meaning.

Given that 2011 was the year of protesting and dreaming dangerously, 2013 prompted us to think responsively and come up with useful ideas and suggestions. At a time when the financial crisis in Greece and elsewhere was reaching a highpoint, the 4th Athens Biennale had to respond to this bleak situation through a pertinent question: Now what? While MONODROME attempted to reflect upon Modern Greek history and the origins of the crisis, AGORA set out to explore creative alternatives to a state of bankruptcy.

Pondering this turning point, AB4 put into play the collaborative process in producing an exhibition. Titled AGORA, it reflected on the way a biennale has to operate under the current socio-economic circumstances. Using the empty building of the former Athens Stock Exchange as its main venue, AB4 proposed AGORA not only as a place of exchange and interaction, but also as an ideal setting for critique. Contrary to an idealised image of the ancient agora, this new AGORA pointed to a radical re-orientation in thinking – one that entails judgment, ruptures and conflict.

AGORA drew on the notions of the assembly and the assemblage. Conceived both as a living organism and an exquisite corpse, it was formulated through a succession of objects, collaborative events, performances, roundtable discussions, film screenings, workshops and educational programs. In AGORA works and theses evoked that which was urgently needed at this particular moment: an engaged subjectivity, an unearthing of timely attitudes, a reevaluation of artistic strategies, a deconstruction of mystifying narratives.

== AB5to6: OMONOIA (2015 - 2017) ==
The fifth edition of the Athens Biennale, symbolically titled “Omonoia” (concord), launched its activities in June 2015 and run for almost two years, until February 2017, around the iconic central square of Athens, Omonoia, using the historic Bagkeion Hotel as its base. AB5to6 also expanded across the broader area of Omonoia through collaborations with cultural institutions, independent art spaces, professionals and small-scale enterprises, such as the National Theatre of Greece, Unit of Innovation and Entrepreneurship (IEU) of the Athens School of Fine Arts (ASFA), Exile Room, BIOS – Romantso etc.

In 2015, the Athens Biennale – constantly intuitive towards the institution of biennales – revised its identity by extending its duration to two years. Bridging the past to the present and the future and by building on its successful previous edition, AB5 arose both as a reaction to the current political and social conditions and as a need to activate the public through art and contemporary theoretical viewpoints.

Unlike traditional Biennial formats, Massimiliano Mollona's role of Programme Director combined theory, curating and process-based urban interventions. In view of the critical historical juncture, the 5th Athens Biennale focused on burning issues such as the emergence of alternative economies, the performative in the political and the establishment of institutions that redefine the systems structures and its pre-existing models, while highlighting the current views of contemporary art. Functioning as an institutional space where the realm of the political is reframed through the lenses of art, OMONOIA hosted various cultural and activist groups that dealt with issues of co-production, self-organisation and urban commoning. These meetings, laboratories and discussions were the experimental “engines” of the Athens Biennale, hosting two international conferences, numerous talks, performances, public interventions and works of art.

== AB6: ANTI (2018) ==
=== Prelude: Waiting for the Barbarians ===
Fall 2018 marked a decade of crisis in which Athens has been an incubator of revolt, opposition, reaction and regression. On 5 April 2017, the Athens Biennale declared a strategic postponing of AB6 in a year of “Active Waiting”, which was intended as a playful exercise on the political imagination of large-scale periodic exhibitions and functioned as a prelude to ANTI. The Athens Biennale office relocated to Bagkeion Hotel and organised a series of performative pre-Biennale events, such as Klassenfahrt and Documena, under the title “Waiting for the Barbarians”. It was curated by Heart & Sword Division, a group of artists, curators and theorists including FYTA, Kostis Stafylakis, Nayia Yiakoumaki and Poka-Yio.

Will there ever be any “Learning from Athens”? What do words such as “education”, “freedom”, “queer”, “north”, “south”, “indigenous” signify in contemporary cultural debates? Are we witnessing the coming of the Barbarians, or the taming of the Barbarian? AB6 Prelude: Waiting for the Barbarians reflected on such questions.

=== ANTI ===
The sixth edition of the Athens Biennale, titled “ANTI”, was curated by Stefanie Hessler, Poka-Yio, and Kostis Stafylakis, inhabiting four iconic neighboring venues in the area surrounding the Old Parliament at Syntagma Square. It was held from October 26 to December 9, 2018, offering a six-week-long unique experience of contemporary art in which more than 100 Greek and international artists and collectives activated the different aspects of ANTI through their contributions. The 6th Athens Biennale presented over 200 works, including 27 works that premiered at AB6, as well as a multi-layered program with close to 100 events.

ANTI's main venue was the TTT building, an iconic Athenian building that since the 1930s has served as the central offices of the Hellenic Telecommunications Organization. The building, work of the architect Anastasios Metaxas, with its Kafkaesque, administrative architecture and interior design, is a symbol of the transition from analog to digital communication. AB6 was also hosted at the former Esperia Palace hotel, once a busy hub of the political, business and cultural scene of Athens until 2010, when its operation suddenly stopped, and Benakeios Library, a historical landmark owned by the Hellenic Parliament, closed since 2004, as well as the former building of TSMEDE, owned by the public insurance organisation.

ANTI presented a distinct, idiosyncratic and uneasy screenshot of our political, social and cultural momentum, highlighting how opposition inhabits both power and resistance, reactionary and progressive outcries, and attitudes that demand new alternatives in the realms mostly shaping our lives today. ANTI was joyful, indulging, and comforting at times, unsettling, ominous, and dystopian at others. An exhibition about our times.

The 6th Athens Biennale dealt with the impact of technology on our lives, work, and relationships; pointed out gendered and racialized injustices; raised questions of self-determination; thematized data-collection processes and surveillance; and scrutinized the seduction of fake news and our obsessions with our own image in the myriad of technological interfaces that surpass our reality today.

ANTI confronted and examined scenarios of trans-human enhancement, cults of wellness as well as bodily and spiritual transformation. The artistic devices that constituted AB6 – from the gym to the KINO, from the online forum to the spa, from the office to the political front – revealed the dangers of today's neo-reactionary politics, asking what might motivate reactionary emotions and fantasies and how to change the current structures of pleasure. By inviting artists and other cultural producers to inhabit situations and devices mimicking, distorting, twisting, or amplifying contemporary life-theaters, ANTI was the departure point for numerous instead-ofs.
