= Gala Porras-Kim =

Colombian interdisciplinary artist (born 1984)

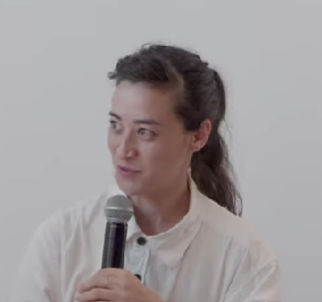
- Born: Bogotá, Colombia
- Education: University of California, Los Angeles (BA, MA); California Institute of the Arts (MFA)
- Known for: Sculpture; drawing
- Awards: Artadia Award; Creative Capital Award; Tiffany Foundation Award; MacArthur Fellowship

Gala Porras-Kim (born 1984) is a Colombian-Korean-American contemporary interdisciplinary artist who lives and works in Los Angeles and London. Her work deals with the fields of linguistics, history, and conservation, often engaging in institutional critique.

Porras-Kim's work is in the collections of Los Angeles County Museum of Art; Museum of Modern Art, Whitney Museum of American Art, both in New York; Hammer Museum, Los Angeles; Dallas Museum of Art; Brooklyn Museum; Fonds régional d'art contemporain des Pays de la Loire, Carquefou, France; Pérez Art Museum Miami; and Seoul Museum of Art.

== Early life and education ==
Gala Porras-Kim is the daughter of academics. Her father, a literature professor from Colombia, met her mother, who is South Korean, while she was studying literature in Bogotá. As a child, Porras-Kim was often brought by her parents to museums, archives, and research sites. She earned a BA (2007) and an MA (2012) from the University of California, Los Angeles, along with an MFA from the California Institute of the Arts in 2009.

== Artwork ==
Porras-Kim's research-based practice spans drawing, sculpture, and installation. Through research and art-making, she often questions the role of museums and heritage institutions in defining and assigning meaning to cultural artefacts. She is especially interested in why and how the definitions of art and objects change when they enter different spaces, as well as how objects have the potential to change the spaces they inhabit. Much of her work deals with time, and the way the perception of objects changes over time, while considering the original sacred function of cultural artefacts and how they are represented in the present.

Porras-Kim uses a social and political context that influences the representation of language and history to create art objects through the learning process. Her work titled National Treasures was exhibited at Leeum Museum of Art in 2023.

== Career highlights ==
As a visiting scholar at the Peabody Museum of Archaeology and Ethnology at Harvard University, Porras-Kim researched objects from archeological sites in Mexico. Her work as artist-in-residence at the Getty Center investigated "social and political contexts that influence how language and history intersect with art." In March 2022, Porras-Kim was featured on the cover of Artforum for her work at Amant gallery in New York. In June 2026, Porras-Kim was the UCLA International Institute commencement speaker.

== Awards ==
Porras-Kim is a recipient of Gold Prize (2023), Art Matters Foundation Grant (2019), Artadia Los Angeles Award (2017), Joan Mitchell Foundation Emerging Artist Grant (2016), Louis Comfort Tiffany Foundation Award (2015), Creative Capital Grant (2015), California Community Foundation Fellowship for Visual Artists (2013), the MacArthur Foundation Fellowship (2025).

Gala Porras-Kim received the 2015 Creative Capital Award in Visual Arts to develop The Mute Object and Ancient Stories of Today, a project that interprets artifacts containing undeciphered writing systems, creating an object-based ethnography that reflects on indigenous rights and the production of meaning.

== Selected exhibitions ==
=== Solo exhibitions ===
- Museum of Contemporary Art Denver (2024)
- Pitzer College Art Galleries (2024)
- National Museum of Modern and Contemporary Art, Korea (2023)
- Leeum Museum of Art, Seoul (2023)
- Museo Universitario de Arte Contemporáneo, Mexico City (2023)
- Gasworks, London (2022)

=== Group exhibitions ===
- Whitney Museum of American Art, New York (2019, 2017)
