= Kunstinstituut Melly =

Art gallery in Rotterdam NL, opened 1990

Coordinates: 51.9154°N 4.4771°E

- The centre in Rotterdam
- Former name: Witte de With Center for Contemporary Art
- Established: 1990
- Location: 50 Witte de Withstraat, 3012 BR; Rotterdam the Netherlands
- Type: Art House
- Director: Gabi Ngcobo
- Curators: Jessy Koeiman, Rosa De Graaf
- Website: kunstinstituutmelly.nl

Kunstinstituut Melly is a contemporary art house located in a former school building on Witte de Withstraat, in Rotterdam, the Netherlands. It was founded in 1990 and originally named after the street it was located on. It presents curated exhibitions, symposiums, live events, educational programs, and has a separate art literature publishing arm.

In 2017, the Witte de With Center for Contemporary Art, as it was known, announced it would change its name in order to distance itself from its de facto namesake, the Dutch naval admiral Witte de With, and recognise the negative impacts of colonialism. Its new name, Kunstinstituut Melly, was announced in 2020, and references a sculpture by Canadian artist Ken Lum displayed on the exterior wall of the building entitled Melly Shum Hates Her Job (1989).

== History ==
The art house was formerly known as the Witte de With Center for Contemporary Art and was established in 1990 as a center for contemporary art with a mission of curating and exhibiting international art exhibitions. It is based in a former school building, which it shared with the TENT gallery.

Chris Dercon was the first director from 1990 to 1996. He was followed by Bartomeu Marí (1996–2001), Catherine David (2002–2004), Hans Maarten van den Brink (2004–2006) and Nicolaus Schafhausen (2006–2011). Defne Ayas was appointed director in 2012, and was succeeded by Sofía Hernández Chong Cuy in 2018, and Gabi Ngcobo in 2024.

== Name change ==
On 17 September 2017, the center announced it would be changing its title because it was named after Witte de With, a Dutch naval officer who had worked for the Dutch East India Company and the Dutch West India Company and therefore was associated with colonialism. Then director Defne Ayas commented, "We were named after our location in 1990, the street in which we are situated is named after. Naming art institutions after locations in a bid to affirm neutrality was a trend in those days." The problem with the name was highlighted by critic Egbert Alejandro Martina during preparatory meetings for the exhibition Cinema Olanda: Platform, which ran alongside the Dutch pavilion at the Venice Biennale. An open letter from Martina and others stated, "Witte de With has 'failed' to come to terms with its own internal contradictions, and has yet to reckon with the historical figure it symbolically embodies."

In response, the center titled its next exhibition Witte de With; What's in a name?. The ongoing debate became a national controversy. By January 2020, questions were being asked in the mainstream media about why the center had not changed its name. In June 2020, as part of the George Floyd protests in the Netherlands, activists vandalized symbols of colonialism in Rotterdam. These included the Piet Hein statue in Delfshaven, the Pim Fortuyn memorial and the Witte de With Center, where they left handprints in red paint. In response, the center immediately took down its name board from the building, and director Sofia Hernandez Chong Cuy announced that there would be a consultation period and then a new name would be announced on January 27, 2021. The centre produced a timeline to record the process.

== Selected exhibitions ==
In 2009 a year-long program at Witte de With was structured as a series of group shows, presentations, performances, screenings and debates including participations by Dineo Seshee Bopape, D.O.R., Simon Denny, Yngve Holen, Mark Leckey, Patrizio di Massimo, Lili Reynaud-Dewar, and Jeremy Shaw.

Douglas Coupland held an exhibition called Bit Rot at the center in 2016.

In 2019, the center hosted a solo show by Firelei Báez about the Haitian Revolution.
