= Carolyn Christov-Bakargiev =

Art historian, critic and curator (born 1957)

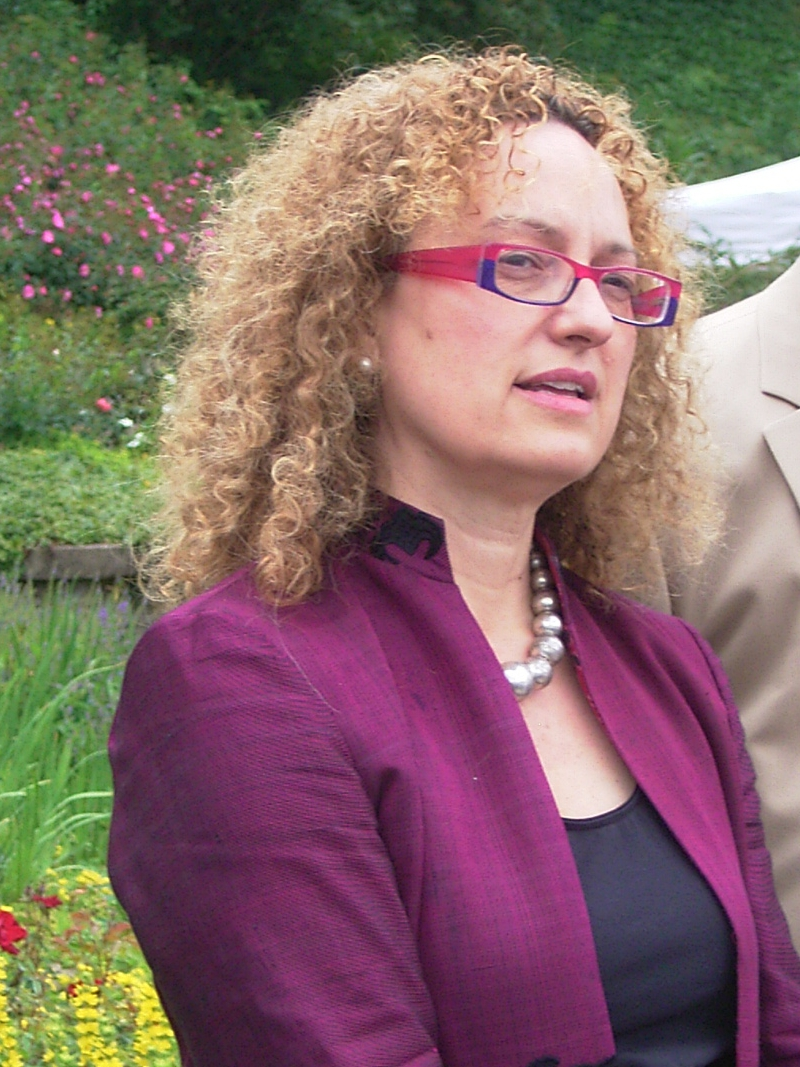
Carolyn Christov-Bakargiev 2012

Carolyn Christov-Bakargiev (born December 2, 1957) is an Italian-American writer, art historian, and exhibition maker who served as the Director of Castello di Rivoli Museo d'Arte Contemporanea in Turin in 2009 and from 2016 to 2023. She was also the founding Director of Fondazione Francesco Federico Cerruti from 2017 to 2023. She was Edith Kreeger Wolf Distinguished Visiting professor in Art Theory and Practice at Northwestern University (2013–2019). She is the recipient of the 2019 Audrey Irmas Award for Curatorial Excellence. She is currently Honorary Guest Professor at FHNW University of Applied Sciences and Arts Northwestern, Switzerland. She has lectured widely at art and educational institutions and Universities for the Arts, including the Goethe University, Frankfurt; Harvard University, Cambridge; MIT, Boston; Jawaharlal Nehru University, New Delhi; Cooper Union, New York; The Courtauld Institute of Art, London; Monash University, Melbourne; Di Tella University, Buenos Aires; Northwestern University, Chicago, and UNITO, Università di Torino, Turin.

Named 2012's most powerful person in the art world by ArtReview's Power 100 listings, Christov-Bakargiev was artistic director of dOCUMENTA (13) which opened in Kassel on June 9, 2012, holding workshops, seminars and exhibitions in Alexandria, Egypt; Kabul, Afghanistan; and Banff, Canada.

== Family and early life ==
Christov-Bakargiev was born in 1957, in Ridgewood, New Jersey, to an Italian mother and a Bulgarian father. She has dual Italian and American citizenship, although she lives and works mostly in Italy. She speaks fluent English, French, Italian, and German.

She completed her high school education in Washington D.C. and subsequently graduated in Literature and Philosophy at the University of Pisa, in 1981. Her degree thesis focused on the relationship between contemporary poetry and painting.

== Art criticism ==
Christov-Bakargiev began her career in the artistic field by writing for The Reporter and the Il Sole 24 Ore newspaper. She wrote about the work of international artists for publications.

== Curating ==
=== Early beginnings ===
After graduation Christov-Bakargiev moved to Rome. From 1987 onwards she worked as an independent curator, organizing several exhibitions including Molteplici Culture, Rome (1992) which included more than fifty artists and curators including Liam Gillick, Dominique Gonzalez-Foerster, Damien Hirst and David Hammons; and The Quick Sound of Things, a tribute to John Cage, exhibition co-curated with Alanna Heiss, Angela Vettese and Ludovico Pratesi for the 1993 Venice Biennale. For Antwerp '93: European Capital of Culture curated with Iwona Blazwick and Yves Aupetitallot the international anthological exhibition On taking a normal situation and retranslating it into overlapping and multiple readings of conditions past and present at the Museum of Contemporary Art, Antwerp (1993). In 1996, she curated the first anthological exhibition on the Italian post-war artist Roberto Burri in Rome (Palazzo delle Esposizioni), Brussels (Palais des Beaux Arts) and Munich (Lenbachhaus).

In 1997, Christov-Bakargiev organized Citta'-Natura, a collective exhibition of international artists including Lucio Fontana, Yves Klein, Lawrence Weiner, Giovanni Anselmo, Mario Merz, Marisa Merz, Luca Vitone, Jannis Kounellis, Willie Doherty, Gary Hill and Mark Dion; the exhibition was presented in Rome in museums and public spaces, from the Palazzo delle Esposizioni through the Civic Museum of Zoology to the Botanical Garden. Subsequently, she co-curated with Laurence Bossé and Hans Ulrich Obrist, La Ville, le Jardin, la Memoire and the spaces of the Villa Medici in Rome (1998–2000), a three-year project that included new commissions by more than one hundred artists including Janet Cardiff, Olafur Eliasson, Annette Messager, Christian Boltanski, Bracha L. Ettinger and Cai Guo-Qiang.

=== P.S.1 Contemporary Art Center, 1999–2001 ===
From 1999 to 2001, Christov-Bakargiev worked as Chief Curator at the P.S.1 Contemporary Art Center in New York. There, in the spring of 2000, she promoted and co-curated the first edition of Greater New York, a collaboration with the Museum of Modern Art.

Subsequently, Christov-Bakargiev curated a documentary exhibition on international art of the 1980s, entitled Around 1984: A Look at Art in the Eighties (2000) and organized the second group exhibition of young artists entitled Some New Minds: Julia Loktev, Omer Fast, James Yamada, John Pilson, Christophe Girardet (December 2000), and solo exhibitions of Georges Adeagbo, Massimo Bartolini, Santiago Sierra and Carla Accardi, as well as the first anthological exhibition in the United States on the work of Luigi Ontani (2001). In the winter of 2001, she curated the first retrospective on the Janet Cardiff exhibition, and the group show Animations with Pierre Huyghe and Angus Fairhurst to Oladele Bamgboye and Damián Ortega, among others. At P.S.1, she also organized a series of experimental projects dedicated to emerging young artists in the New York area and around the world, including Nedko Solakov and Michael Rakowitz.

=== Castello di Rivoli, 2002–2023 ===
Christov-Bakargiev was appointed Chief Curator of the Castello di Rivoli Museum of Contemporary Art in January 2002. Her first project at the Castello di Rivoli is Matrix.2 by Francis Alÿs, in May 2002. In 2003, she curated the collective exhibition The Moderns / I moderni che explores modernist perspectives in the works of young artists from around the world. In 2004, for the Castello di Rivoli she curated a traveling exhibition with works by William Kentridge at the beginning of 2004, also presented at the K20 in Düsseldorf, at the MCA Museum of Contemporary Art in Sydney, at the Museum of Contemporary Art in Montreal, and at the Johannesburg Art Gallery. She followed with a solo exhibition of Pierre Huyghe in spring 2004. In autumn 2004 she curated an anthological exhibition of the American artist Franz Kline, followed in 2004/2005 by Faces in the Crowd, co-curated with Iwona Blazwick.

In 2006, Christov-Bakargiev co-curated with Ida Gianelli and Judith Blackall the Arte Povera exhibition at the MCA Museum of Contemporary Art in Sydney. She co-treats Pantagruel syndrome. T1 TorinoTriennaleTremusei, the first Triennale di Torino, a project that inaugurated in November 2005 with the aim of exploring the conceptual gigantism and fragility of our gargantuan world, through two solo exhibitions by Takashi Murakami and Doris Salcedo, but also a group exhibition in entire city of works by 75 young artists from all over the world, including Tamy Ben-Tor, Fernando Bryce, Sebastián Díaz Morales, Jin Kurashige, Araya Radsjamroensook and Apichatpong Weerasethakul.

In 2008, Christov-Bakargiev was the artistic director of the 16th Biennale of Sydney. Entitled Revolutions – Forms That Turn, the biennial spans major Australian art institutions, including the Art Gallery of New South Wales, the Museum of Contemporary Art Australia, Artspace, the Sydney Opera House and Cockatoo Island and is conceived as a constellation of artworks that explore the impulse to revolt and all those forms embedded in the etymology of the word "revolution", such as the relationship and gap between revolutionary art and art for revolution from the first avant-gardes to today

In 2012, Christov-Bakargiev was the artistic director of documenta's 13th edition, dOCUMENTA (13), in Kassel, Germany, but which also included a series of workshops, seminars, and exhibitions in Alexandria, Kabul, and Banff. The show presented new commissions from over 150 artists and other participants, including Janet Cardiff and George Bures Miller, William Kentridge, Manon de Boer, Tino Sehgal, Wael Shawky, Walid Raad, Etel Adnan, Mariam Ghani and Goshka Macuga. dOCUMENTA (13) also included an editorial project entitled 100 Notes - 100 Thoughts which was composed of facsimiles of existing notebooks, commissioned essays, collaborations and conversations. To launch her edition of Documenta, she issued a dog-themed calendar, Dogumenta, presumably to advertise her ‘‘anti-anthropomorphic'' perspective.

In 2015, Christov-Bakargiev curated the 14th Istanbul Saltwater Biennial titled Saltwater: A Theory of Formsche brings together new commissions and existing artworks made by more than eighty participants using over twenty-five venues across the Bosphorus with works by artists such as William Kentridge, Lawrence Weiner, Bracha L. Ettinger, Walid Raad, Wael Shawky, Ed Atkins, Aslı Çavuşoğlu, Cevdet Erek and others.

In 2017, Christov-Bakargiev facilitated the museum's acquisition of the $570 million collection of Federico Cerruti, which includes several important works by Giorgio de Chirico.

In addition to her work at Castello di Rivoli, Christov-Bakargiev also served as director of the Galleria Civica d'Arte Moderna e Contemporanea in Turin from 2016 to 2018; both museums later merged during her tenure when she curated Colori. Towards the end of her tenure, she was only responsible for the Castello di Rivoli.

During the COVID-19 pandemic in Italy, Christov-Bakargiev temporarily used the Castello di Rivoli as a vaccination site.

In 2022, Christov-Bakargiev helped curate A Cielo Aperto (Open Sky), four artworks by Olafur Eliasson, Otobong Nkanga, Susan Philipsz and Michelangelo Pistoletto erected throughout Cuneo, in Piedmont, to celebrate the 30th anniversary of the non-profit Fondazione CRC.

== Juries ==
Christov-Bakargiev was part of the juries that selected Francis Upritchard for the Walters Prize in 2006; Helen Marten for the Hepworth Prize for Sculpture in 2016; Cally Spooner for the Artissima art fair's Illy Present Future Prize in 2017; Nima Nabavi for the Bulgari Contemporary Art Award in 2022; Senga Nengudi (2023), Otobong Nkanga (2024) and Petrit Halilaj for the Nasher Prize; Anna Boghiguian for the Wolfgang Hahn Prize in 2024; and Shu Lea Cheang for the LG Guggenheim Award in 2024.

Since 2021, Christov-Bakargiev has been serving on the selection committee for The Future Is Unwritten artist response fund.

== Lectures ==
Interested in the relationship between historical avant-gardes and contemporary art, Christov-Bakargiev has written extensively on the Arte Povera movement and art for magazines and catalogues. Her book Arte Povera was published by Phaidon Press, London, in 1999. She also published the first monograph on the work of the South African artist William Kentridge, which accompanied the first traveling Kentridge retrospective between 1998 and 1999 at Palais des Beaux Arts, Brussels; Serpentine Gallery, London; MACBA, Barcelona, and the first monograph by Canadian artist Janet Cardiff at PS1 Contemporary Art Center, New York, 2001, as well as a monograph on the work of Pierre Huyghe (Skira, Milan, and Castello di Rivoli, 2004) and Franz Kline (Skira, Milan, and Castello di Rivoli, 2004). For dOCUMENTA (13), she wrote several theses and commissioned over 100 essays for the three-volume catalog and publication series with Hatje Cantz "100 Gedanken / 100 Notizen (100 Notes / 100 Thoughts)". She published the catalog "Saltwater: A Theory of Thought Forms" for the 14th Istanbul Biennial (IKSV, 2015).

In 2013, Christov-Bakargiev was Menschel Visiting professor in art at the Cooper Union, New York and Pernod Ricard Visiting professor in philosophy of art and nature-culture at Goethe University Frankfurt. In 2015, she was a Getty Visiting Scholar. In 2014, she was awarded the Leverhulme Professorship by the University of Leeds. In 2018, she was Professor of the Shanghai Curators Lab program at the Shanghai Academy of Art.

== Other activities ==
- Flash Art, Member of the Advisory Board

== Recognition ==
- 2018 – Audrey Irmas Award for Curatorial Excellence

== Selected publications ==
- Willie Doherty. In the dark, projected works (Im Dunkeln, projizierte Arbeiten), Kunsthalle Bern, 1996, ISBN 3-85780-108-5
- William Kentridge, Palais des Beaux-Arts, Brüssel, 1998, ISBN 90-74816-09-6
- Arte Povera (Themes and Movements), Phaidon Press, London, 1998, ISBN 978-0714834139
- Janet Cardiff, a survey of works (including collaborations with George Bures Miller), P.S. 1 Contemporary Art Center, Long Island City, 2001, ISBN 0-9704428-3-1
- The Moderns, Skira, Milan, 2003, ISBN 978-88-8491-544-3
- Pierre Huyghe, Skira, Milan, 2004, ISBN 978-88-8491-573-3
- with David Anfam: Franz Kline (1910–1962), Skira, Milan, 2004, ISBN 978-88-8491-866-6
- Revolutions – Forms That Turn, Biennale of Sydney, Thames and Hudson, 2008 ISBN 978-0500976845
- Thomas Ruff, Castello di Rivoli Museo d'Arte Contemporanea, Skira, Milan, Castello di Rivoli Museo d'Arte Contemporanea, 2009 ISBN 9788857201863
- Documenta 13: Catalog I/3, II/3, III/3, The Book of Books, Kassel, Hatje Cantz, 2012, ISBN 978-3775729512
- 14th Istanbul Biennial Saltwater Catalogue, Istanbul, IKSV Yayinlari, 2015, ISBN 978-6055275259
- Hito Steyerl: The City of Broken Windows, Castello di Rivoli Museo d'Arte Contemporanea, Skira, Milan, Castello di Rivoli Museo d'Arte Contemporanea, 2019, ISBN 9788857240299
- "Foreword", in Carolee Thea, On Curating II, D.A.P. Publications, New York, 2019 ISBN 9781938922909
- with Hans Ulrich Obrist and Eungie Joo: Adrián Villar Rojas, Phaidon, London, 2020, ISBN 978-07-1487-501-9
