= Kristina Buch =

German artist and academic (born 1983)

- Born: 1983 (age 42–43); Meerbusch, Germany
- Education: Imperial College London; Royal College of Art; Kunstakademie Düsseldorf
- Known for: Installation, sculpture, video, public art, drawing, text and sound
- Notable work: The Lover at Documenta 13 (2012); Some at times cast light. (2014–15)
- Awards: Young European Artist Award (2012); Großer Hans-Purrmann-Preis der Stadt Speyer (2019)

Kristina Buch (born 1983) is a German artist and academic. Her work includes installation, sculpture, video, public art, drawing and works with text and sound. Before training as an artist, she studied biology and theology. Some of her projects involve living organisms, municipal procedures or the public. She took part in Documenta 13 in 2012 and in the 14th Istanbul Biennial in 2015. Since 2022 she has taught sculpture at the Staatliche Akademie der Bildenden Künste Karlsruhe, where she was appointed professor of sculpture in 2023.

Her contribution to Documenta 13, The Lover, was a garden of local plants and butterflies tended over the hundred days of the exhibition. For Some at times cast light. (2014–15) Buch got the city of Bochum to name a square after a fictitious woman the artist invented. Since 2019 she has worked with the electronic composer Robert Logan on spoken-word and sound pieces. She received the Young European Artist Award of Trieste Contemporanea in 2012 and the Großer Hans-Purrmann-Preis der Stadt Speyer in 2019. A monograph on her work, Between Horizons, edited by Chus Martínez, was published by Hatje Cantz in 2026.

== Early life and education ==
Buch was born in 1983 in Meerbusch, near Düsseldorf. She studied biology at Imperial College London (BSc, 2003–2006) and, by correspondence, several semesters of Protestant theology at the Marc Bloch University in Strasbourg. She completed an MA in sculpture at the Royal College of Art, London, in 2009. Her graduation installation, Bevor das Ich gefaltet war (Before the I was folded), incorporated a clay object worked by a group of chimpanzees at Whipsnade Zoo and was reported in the London press. From 2009 to 2013 she studied at the Kunstakademie Düsseldorf, where she was awarded the title of Meisterschülerin (a distinction conferred by German art academies on selected graduates) under Rosemarie Trockel. She completed an MSc in biology at the University of Düsseldorf. In 2020 she became a PhD fellow of the German Academic Scholarship Foundation at the Department of Plant Sciences, University of Cambridge.

== Academic career ==
From 2013 to 2015 Buch was assistant professor with Carolyn Christov-Bakargiev at the Goethe University Frankfurt. In 2015–16 she was visiting lecturer in the Schering Stiftung's "Next Society" programme at the Institut Kunst of the Basel Academy of Art and Design. She was a research associate at the Institute for Art and Art Theory of the University of Cologne in 2019. She was a supervisor at Queens' College, Cambridge in 2020–21. From 2021 to 2023 she was professor at the Umeå Academy of Fine Arts in Sweden, where she co-coordinated the MFA programme. She has taught sculpture at the Staatliche Akademie der Bildenden Künste Karlsruhe since the winter semester 2022/23 and was appointed professor in 2023.

== Work ==
Buch works across media. Several of her projects are continued by plants, insects, public bodies or visitors after she has set their conditions. Her works fall into several groups.

=== Life-gestures ===
Buch uses the term "life-gesture" for situations that unfold over time and depend on other living beings. Her contribution to Documenta 13 in Kassel, The Lover (2012), was a garden of about 100 m² raised on exposed scaffolding to eye level on Friedrichsplatz, a square rebuilt on rubble from the Second World War. It held some 3,000 plants of 180 native species and about 3,000 butterflies of 40 native species, which Buch hatched in bookshelves converted into hatching cages in her flat and carried to the garden each morning over the 100 days of the exhibition; a vitrine of the empty chrysalises was shown in the documenta Halle. Buch, then 29, was the youngest participant in the exhibition.

Two Monks and a Rabbit (or A Cosmic Hunger Based on and Dedicated to a Carrot) (2013), at the Emily Harvey Foundation in New York, was a game played by Buch and the artist Anna K.E. across a black field edged with neon tape, using pieces of carrot as tokens and rules that were never fixed; a rabbit joined the game. In "One of the things that baffles me about you is that you remain unmurdered." (2012–16) Buch lived with a chicken for more than 900 days. She had proposed to cook the bird into a soup and serve it to guests at the closing of an exhibition; when the gallery refused and asked her to use a shop-bought chicken instead, she declined and went on living with the bird until the work was completed. Part of the documentation was published as a co-authored page in the Süddeutsche Zeitung on 5–6 December 2015, and the publication itself became part of the work: the head of the Feuilleton cut the work's title during the print run, so that the first 100,000 of the 600,000 copies carry it and the remaining 500,000 do not. The censored and uncensored newspaper pages and the ensuing email exchange were incorporated into the piece alongside a 24-minute video.

A photographic series, Other horizons (2009–ongoing), records animals in zoo enclosures and the painted backdrops built for them.

=== Public space and municipal procedure ===
A second group of works operates through public and municipal procedures. For Some at times cast light. (Manche werfen, gießen, betonieren, verteilen manchmal Licht.) (2014–15), commissioned for the festival This is not Detroit by Urbane Künste Ruhr and the Schauspielhaus Bochum, the artist had a square in the city of Bochum named Grete-Penelope-Mars-Platz, after a woman she invented, by a formal decision of the municipal council; the city maps were officially redrafted, an official street sign was put up, a bronze bust on a stone plinth was installed, and the artist increased the firefly population of the adjoining park. The city's own portrait of "Grete-Penelope Mars" records that she never lived.

It's normal that reality happens. (these games will fall apart) (2016), commissioned by BAU and Merano Arte for a public park in Merano, is the visible remainder of a white marble sculpture whose main body is buried in the lawn: lines of local marble laid into the grass in the pattern of an abstract playing field, with no instructions and no rules. OH, BOY! (conjugation of a stick) (2017), produced for Urban Lights Ruhr in Marl, is a structure of steel, concrete, white tiles and stained glass that reads from a distance as a plain wall; it opens at one end into a tiled space too narrow for an adult to enter, while the other end bends into a curve, and its roof of church-window and screen-printed glass casts coloured shadows on the tiles below. Buch takes the title from the passage in Exodus in which the staff of Moses becomes a snake and then a staff again. Playing above the snake line (2018), commissioned by the Bundeskunsthalle in Bonn for The Playground Project – Outdoor, is a walk-on field 75 metres long in EPDM, the surfacing used for sports grounds, marked with white game lines; at its far end the field turns upward and continues up a wall, on which a dartboard expanded to the scale of a rose window is hung.

=== Interventions in museums ===
For later, Goliath. And then started humming (2013–17), intarsias cast in edible sugar and resembling paintings by Kazimir Malevich and Barnett Newman were placed unannounced in museum collections of modern painting and left to be licked away by visitors, so that only their labels remained. It was presented in the permanent collection of the Museo de Arte Latinoamericano de Buenos Aires (MALBA) in 2017. untitled (holes) (2014) at the Kölnischer Kunstverein was a one-off, unrecorded concert based on 120 sheets of a fragmented score by the artist's grandfather, in which the holes left by erasures were treated as part of the notation.

=== Language, spoken word and sound ===
Language, spoken word and sound form a further strand. For the 14th Istanbul Biennial, Saltwater: A Theory of Thought Forms (2015), curated by Carolyn Christov-Bakargiev, Buch made the two-channel video and sound work Such prophecies we write on banana skins. (triangulation of criminal grace), shown in a garage in Beyoğlu, in which the inverted triangle of the Solomon R. Guggenheim Museum and the upright triangle of Mount Everest stand side by side before both are destroyed, the sequence following frame by frame the closing explosion of the film Zabriskie Point. The work followed a research trip through eastern Turkey to the ruined city of Ani on the Armenian border.

EXECUTION SEMANTICS for a necessary criminal (2016), her exhibition at the Kunsthalle Bremerhaven, began a series in which words and sentences are cut and their severed heads repeated and displaced into a new pattern; for the Kunsthalle's cloakroom the fragments were woven into a Jacquard curtain some nine metres wide. You can't walk unless the word runs. (2019), a ten-channel video and sound installation shown at the Gesellschaft für Aktuelle Kunst (GAK) in Bremen in 2020, shows mouths in close-up producing glossolalia. The same exhibition included That down payment. You forgot? Lost it? (no bills) (2020), eight Jacquard-woven flags depicting tongues and hung from the ceiling, each carrying an image on one face and its negative on the other.

Since 2019 Buch has collaborated with the British-Hungarian electronic composer Robert Logan on Protolexicon, an online audio archive of sounds and proto-languages from across the kingdoms of life, assembled together with scientific and cultural research groups. In July 2020 the GAK presented their online performance series Proto-Lexicon, with spoken-word video pieces including Rivers will follow, A war of words and Like Jonah, so is this generation now emerging from the whale; the series is ongoing. In 2021 Buch and Logan were jointly awarded the Berlin Fellowship of the Akademie der Künste. A selection of their spoken-word compositions is issued on the audio CD accompanying her 2026 monograph.

=== Drawing, intarsia and screenprint ===
Alongside her larger projects Buch makes clay drawings, sketches and small paintings on paper and on wooden panels. During the pandemic, while living outside Cambridge in the Fens, she began A TABLE FULL OF STRANGERS (the end of cosmic loneliness) (2020–ongoing), a series of pencil drawings of native animals, each drawn from the moment in which the animal's gaze met hers; 86 had been made by 2021, and a group of them was shown at Lunds konsthall in 2021–22.

Buch has worked in wood since at least 2015, among other things in the small panel Notes on discerning winds (2015) and the wooden intarsia Bailout (disambiguation)—a table for my friends and enemies (2015). In her intarsias segments of wood are laid into a continuous surface, which she then colours with a pigment wash. Later works in the medium include Necessary and sufficient stoma. (2019), Historians, prophets and other species (notes on event horizons) (2025) and Life—Comma—(notes on orthography) (2025).

In Taxonomies (1) (2020) Buch burned drawings into wood with light. From late 2022 she began translating small sketches into larger screenprints on wooden panels, many of them diptychs in which a single element is shifted between the two panels. Works in this group include The prophet and the liar (2022), the diptych Laying stones into air (2023) and Exercises for the future present (2024).

== Selected works ==
- Bevor das Ich gefaltet war (Before the I was folded) (2009) – fan, plastic bag, transport crate and unfired clay worked by chimpanzees at Whipsnade Zoo; Royal College of Art, London
- The Lover (2012) – scaffold structure, soil, plants and butterflies over 100 days; Documenta 13, Kassel
- "One of the things that baffles me about you is that you remain unmurdered." (2012–16) – life-gesture of more than 900 days; HD video, newspaper pages and email exchange
- later, Goliath. And then started humming (2013–17) – edible candy intarsias placed unannounced in museum collections
- untitled (holes) (2014) – one-off, unrecorded concert by the musician Iko Birk from a fragmentary 120-sheet score by the artist's grandfather; Kölnischer Kunstverein, Cologne
- Some at times cast light. (2014–15) – redrafted city map, street sign, bronze bust and fireflies for a square the artist had named by decision of the city council; Bochum
- Such prophecies we write on banana skins. (triangulation of criminal grace) (2015) – two-channel HD video installation with soundscape, 3 min 27 s, loop; 14th Istanbul Biennial
- EXECUTION SEMANTICS for a necessary criminal (2016) – installation with Jacquard-woven curtain, video and text; Kunsthalle Bremerhaven
- It's normal that reality happens. (these games will fall apart) (2016) – partly buried white marble sculpture, its visible lines forming a game field in a public park; Merano
- OH, BOY! (conjugation of a stick) (2017) – steel, concrete, stained glass, tiles and bronze hooks, 350 × 464 × 45 cm; Urban Lights Ruhr, Marl
- Playing above the snake line (2018) – EPDM playing field, 75 × 6 × 5.5 m; Bundeskunsthalle, Bonn
- You can't walk unless the word runs. (2019) – ten-channel HD video and sound installation; GAK Bremen
- Rivers will follow and A war of words (2020) – spoken-word video pieces with sound by Robert Logan
- A TABLE FULL OF STRANGERS (the end of cosmic loneliness) (2020–ongoing) – series of pencil drawings of animals; Lunds konsthall

== Exhibitions ==
=== Solo exhibitions ===
Solo exhibitions
Year	Title	Venue	Ref.
2009	Come dear art, come.	Hockney Gallery, Royal College of Art, London	
2013	Two Monks and a Rabbit	Emily Harvey Foundation, New York	
2013	Sole Marie Sits	Temporary Gallery, Cologne	
2014	untitled (holes)	Kölnischer Kunstverein, Cologne	
2016	EXECUTION SEMANTICS for a necessary criminal	Kunsthalle Bremerhaven	
2017	later, Goliath. And then started humming (intervention in the permanent collection)	Museo de Arte Latinoamericano de Buenos Aires (MALBA)	
2020	You can't walk unless the word runs.	Gesellschaft für Aktuelle Kunst (GAK), Bremen	

=== Selected group exhibitions ===
- 2012 – Documenta 13, Kassel
- 2014 – Outside, Index – The Swedish Contemporary Art Foundation, Stockholm
- 2014 – This is not Detroit, Urbane Künste Ruhr / Schauspielhaus Bochum
- 2015 – 14th Istanbul Biennial, Saltwater: A Theory of Thought Forms
- 2015–16 – Regionale 16, Kunsthalle Basel
- 2016 – The Animal Mirror, International Studio & Curatorial Program (ISCP), New York
- 2016 – Art & Nature, BAU, Merano
- 2017 – Urban Lights Ruhr, Marl
- 2018 – Welcome to the Jungle, Kunsthalle Düsseldorf
- 2018 – The Playground Project – Outdoor, Bundeskunsthalle, Bonn
- 2021 – Look at this, Pinakothek der Moderne, Munich
- 2021–22 – In the Pupil of the Panther, Lunds konsthall, Lund
- 2024 – The Breath of a House Is the Sound of Voices Within, Akademie der Künste, Berlin (with Robert Logan)

== Awards and fellowships ==
- 2012 – Young European Artist Award, Trieste Contemporanea
- 2015–16 – Bremerhaven Stipendium
- 2019 – Großer Hans-Purrmann-Preis der Stadt Speyer
- 2019 – shortlisted for the Einstein Fellowship of the Einstein Forum and the Wittenstein Foundation
- 2020 – PhD scholarship, Studienstiftung des deutschen Volkes
- 2021 – Berlin Fellowship, Akademie der Künste, Berlin (with Robert Logan)

== Collections ==
Buch's work is held in the following public collections:

- Bayerische Staatsgemäldesammlungen (Pinakothek der Moderne), Munich
- Museum Kunstpalast, Düsseldorf (Stadtsparkasse Düsseldorf collection)
- Borusan Contemporary, Istanbul
- Art collection of the German Federal Ministry for the Environment, Berlin

== Publications ==
=== Monograph ===
- Chus Martínez (ed.): Kristina Buch: Between Horizons. Texts by Chus Martínez, Aimee Walleston, Ben Quash and Kristina Buch; conversation between Carolyn Christov-Bakargiev and Kristina Buch; audio CD of spoken-word compositions by Kristina Buch and Robert Logan. Berlin: Hatje Cantz, 2026. 304 pp. ISBN 978-3-7757-6188-8.

=== Writings by Buch ===
- "The cradle and the table (A liturgy of return)". In Lisa Mazza and Simone Mair (eds.), The Taste of Future Landscapes. London: Dent-de-Leone / BAU – Institute for Contemporary Art and Ecology, 2025, pp. 48–49.
- "Like Jonah, so is this generation now emerging from the whale". In Chus Martínez (ed.), The Wild Book of Inventions. Berlin: Sternberg Press, 2020, pp. 250–257. ISBN 978-3-95679-249-6.
- "Carte Blanche". MOFF, no. 16, April 2018, pp. 82–93.

=== Catalogues and book chapters featuring the work ===
- Großer Hans-Purrmann-Preis der Stadt Speyer 2019: Kristina Buch. Speyer: Stadt Speyer / Hans-Purrmann-Stiftung, 2019 (catalogue on Buch).
- Nike Dreyer: Tiere in der Kunst: Eine Ästhetik des Lebendigen. Munich: Edition Metzel, 2020, pp. 279–297 (chapter).
- Nike Dreyer: "Begegnungen mit Kunst und Schmetterlingen: The Lover von Kristina Buch". In Alexandra Böhm and Jessica Ullrich (eds.), Animal Encounters: Kontakt, Interaktion und Relationalität. Stuttgart: J. B. Metzler, 2019, pp. 207–222 (chapter).
- Gregor Jansen, Anna Lena Seiser and Jasmina Merz (eds.): Welcome to the Jungle. Vienna: Verlag für moderne Kunst, 2018, pp. 15–23, 172–182 (sections of an exhibition catalogue). ISBN 978-3-903269-31-6.
- Helga Meister and Beat Wismer (eds.): Neue Düsseldorfer Kunstszene in 70 Porträts. Cologne: Wienand, 2016, pp. 36–42 (section). ISBN 978-3-86832-371-9.
- T. J. Demos: Decolonizing Nature: Contemporary Art and the Politics of Ecology. Berlin: Sternberg Press, 2016, pp. 230, 241 (passages).
- Carolyn Christov-Bakargiev (ed.): dOCUMENTA (13): Das Begleitbuch / The Guidebook. Catalog 3/3. Ostfildern: Hatje Cantz, 2012, pp. 50–51 (section). ISBN 978-3-7757-2954-3.

== Reception ==
In 2012 Aimee Walleston wrote an article on The Lover for Art in America. In the same year T. J. Demos listed the work among the gardens of Documenta 13, and he returned to the exhibition's ecological works in his 2016 book Decolonizing Nature. Nike Dreyer devoted a chapter to The Lover in a 2019 volume on animal encounters in art. Reviewing later, Goliath. And then started humming in 2013, Kay Heymer in Monopol read the licked-away sugar paintings as an iconoclasm that the artist hands over to the public. Alice Hattrick, writing in The White Review in 2014, described untitled (holes), The Lover and Some at times cast light. as works made out of gaps and erasure. Kirsty Bell, in Frieze, described the Istanbul video as a work "inspired by the destruction of churches in Eastern Anatolia". Stefanie Hessler, reviewing the Bremerhaven exhibition for Mousse in 2016, approached the cut and rewoven words from the premise that meaning is a construct.
