= Chiara Fumai =

Italian performance artist (1978–2017)

- Born: 1978; Rome, Italy
- Died: 16 August 2017 (aged 39); Bari, Italy
- Other name: Nico Fumai
- Occupation: performance artist
- Known for: performance art

Chiara Fumai (1978–2017) was an Italian performance artist.

== Life and career ==
Born in Rome, Fumai graduated in architecture from Polytechnic University of Milan, and had her breakout in 2013, winning Furla Prize with a performance based on a work by Valerie Solanas. She took part in documenta (13) and held performances at MAXXI, Galerie nationale du Jeu de Paume and Fondazione Bevilacqua La Masa, among other places. In 2016 she won the Premio New York.

Fumai in her performance practice centered her artistic focus on the role of women. Her approach involved a combination of deconstruction methods, exploration of freak shows, engagement with metaphysics, transvestism, and DJ sets. This analysis was conducted through an anarcho-feminist lens, also in relation to the art system. She also exhibited under the pseudonym Nico Fumai, a fictitious character inspired by her father. In 2019 her works were exhibited in the Italian Pavilion on the occasion of the 58th International Art Exhibition of the Venice Biennale. Her work was the subject of a solo show at the Centre d’Art Contemporain Genève in 2020.

== Death and commemoration ==
Chiara Fumai committed suicide on 16 August 2017, at the age of 39.

Her archives are held in the Castello di Rivoli in Turin. In 2023, the gardens of Piazza Eroi del Mare in Bari have been named after the artist.
