= Documenta (13) =

2012 art exhibition in Kassel, Germany

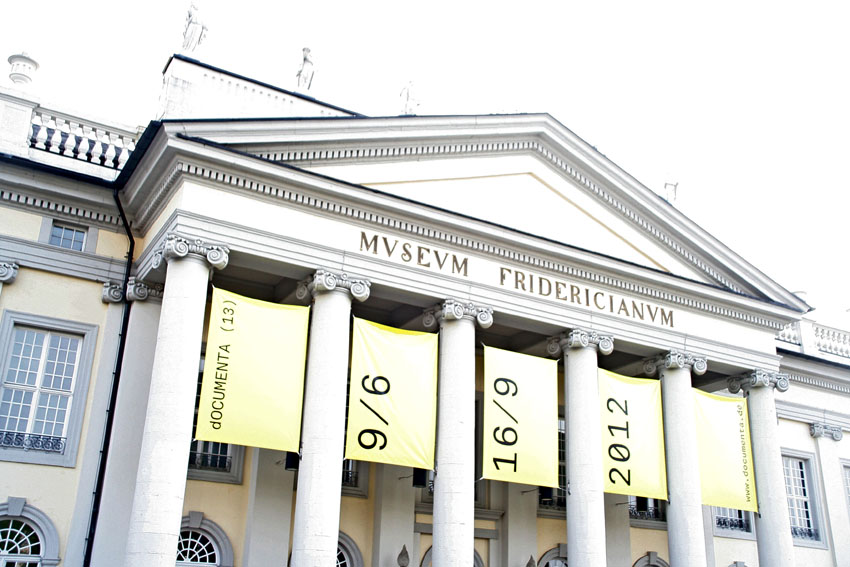
Kassel d13

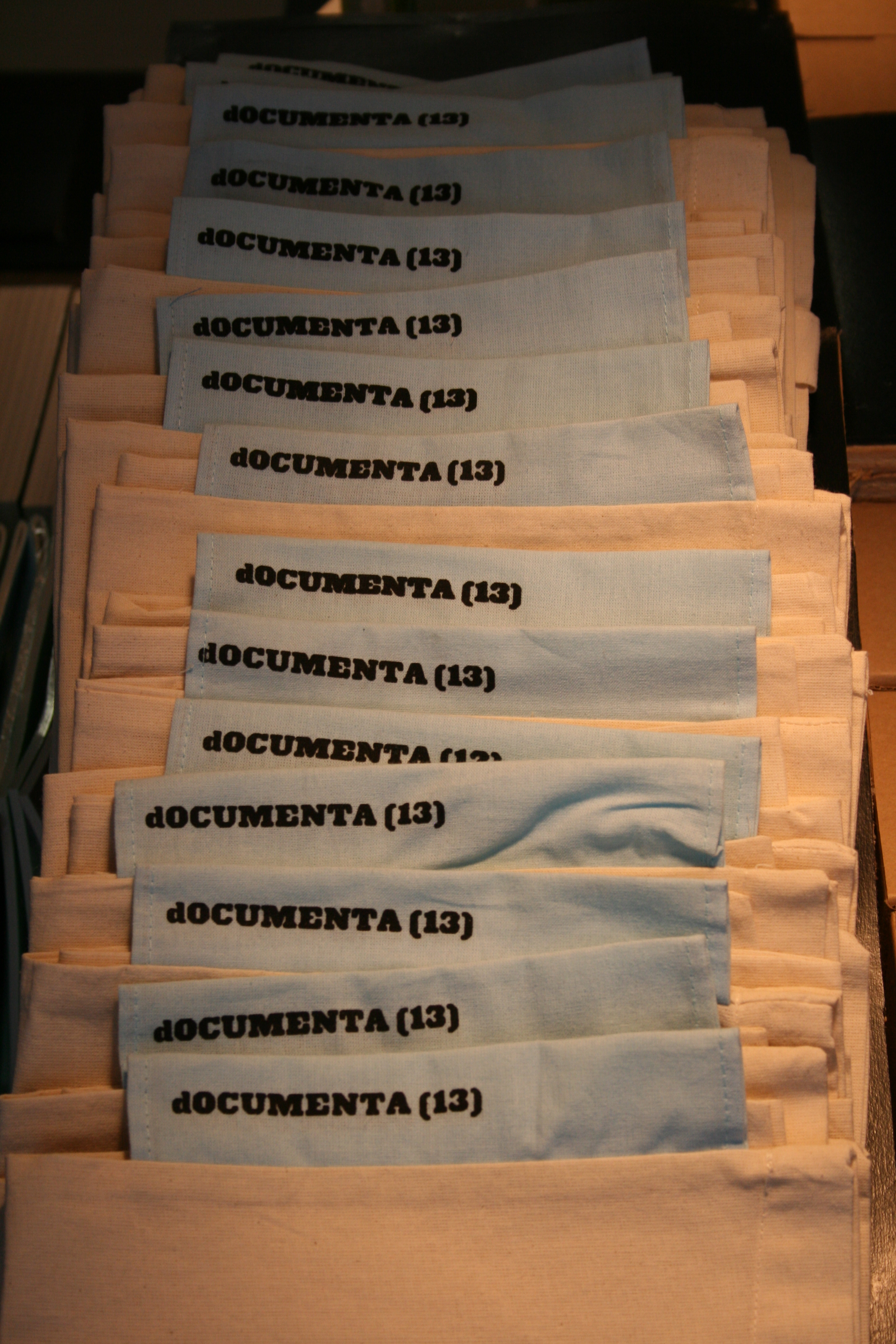
dOCUMENTA (13)

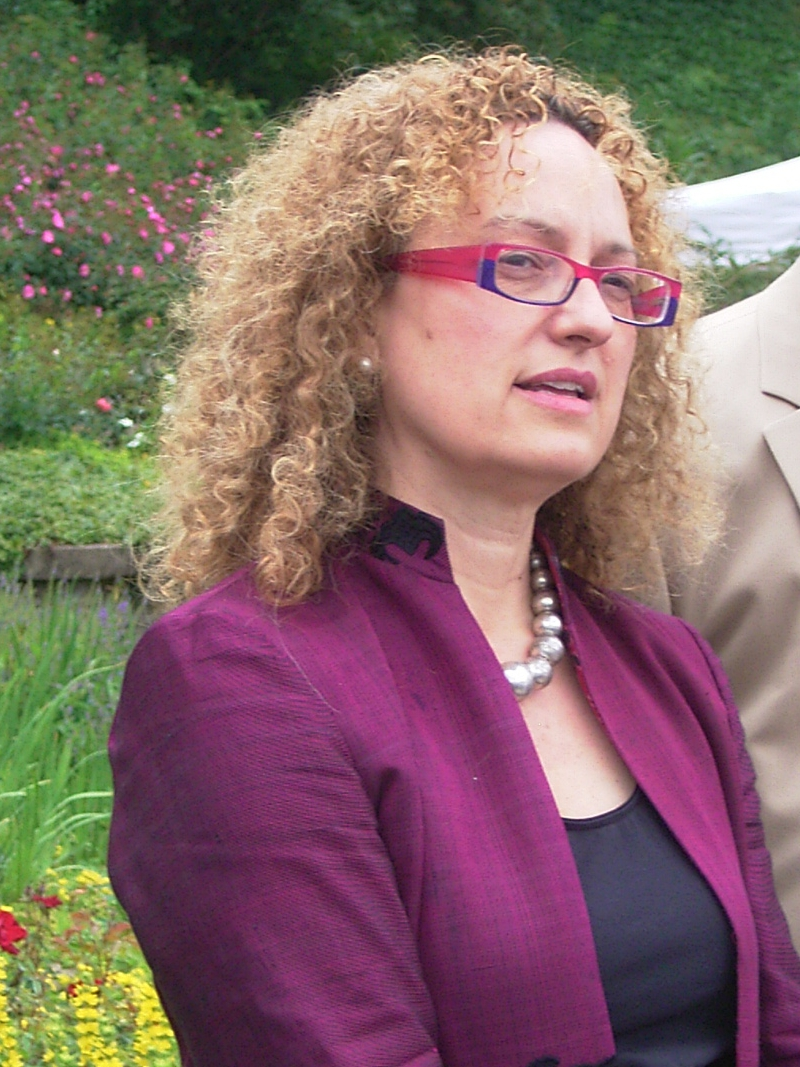
Carolyn Christov-Bakargiev 2010

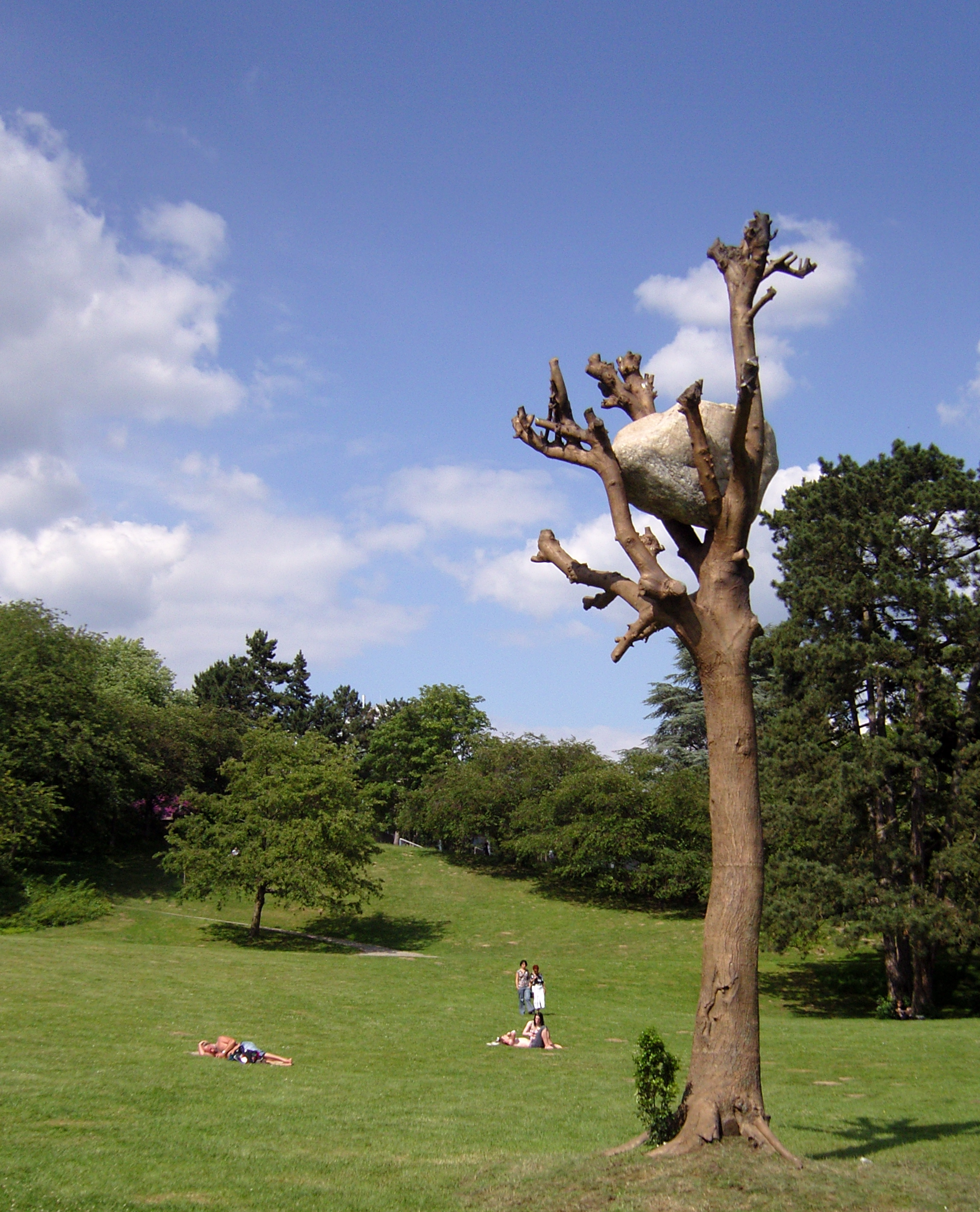
Penone Kassel d13

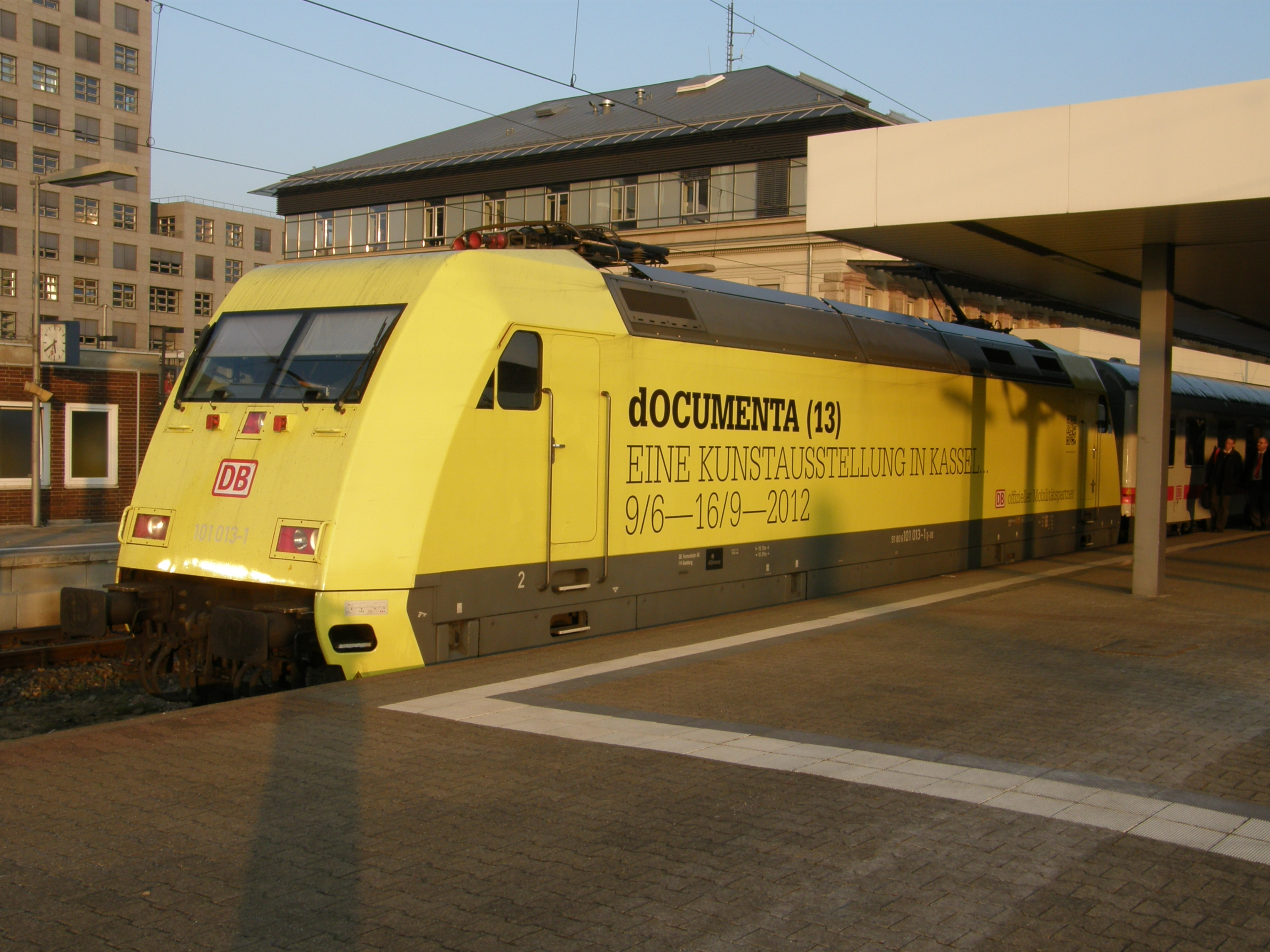
train

Documenta 13 (stylised as dOCUMENTA (13)) was the thirteenth edition of the German contemporary art exhibition Documenta. It took place between 9 June until 16 September 2012 in Kassel, Germany. The exhibition was held under the theme "collapse and recovery". Exhibits could be seen in several venues in the city, among others in the Fridericianum museum, in the Orangerie and in the Karlsaue, a large urban park.

Its artistic director was the curator Carolyn Christov-Bakargiev who was chief curator of the Castello di Rivoli - Museo d'Arte Contemporanea in Turin and, in 2008, also head of the Biennale of Sydney.

The exhibition's welcoming of Occupy Wall Street protesters has been framed as a "watershed" moment in the decline of that movement.

== Participants ==
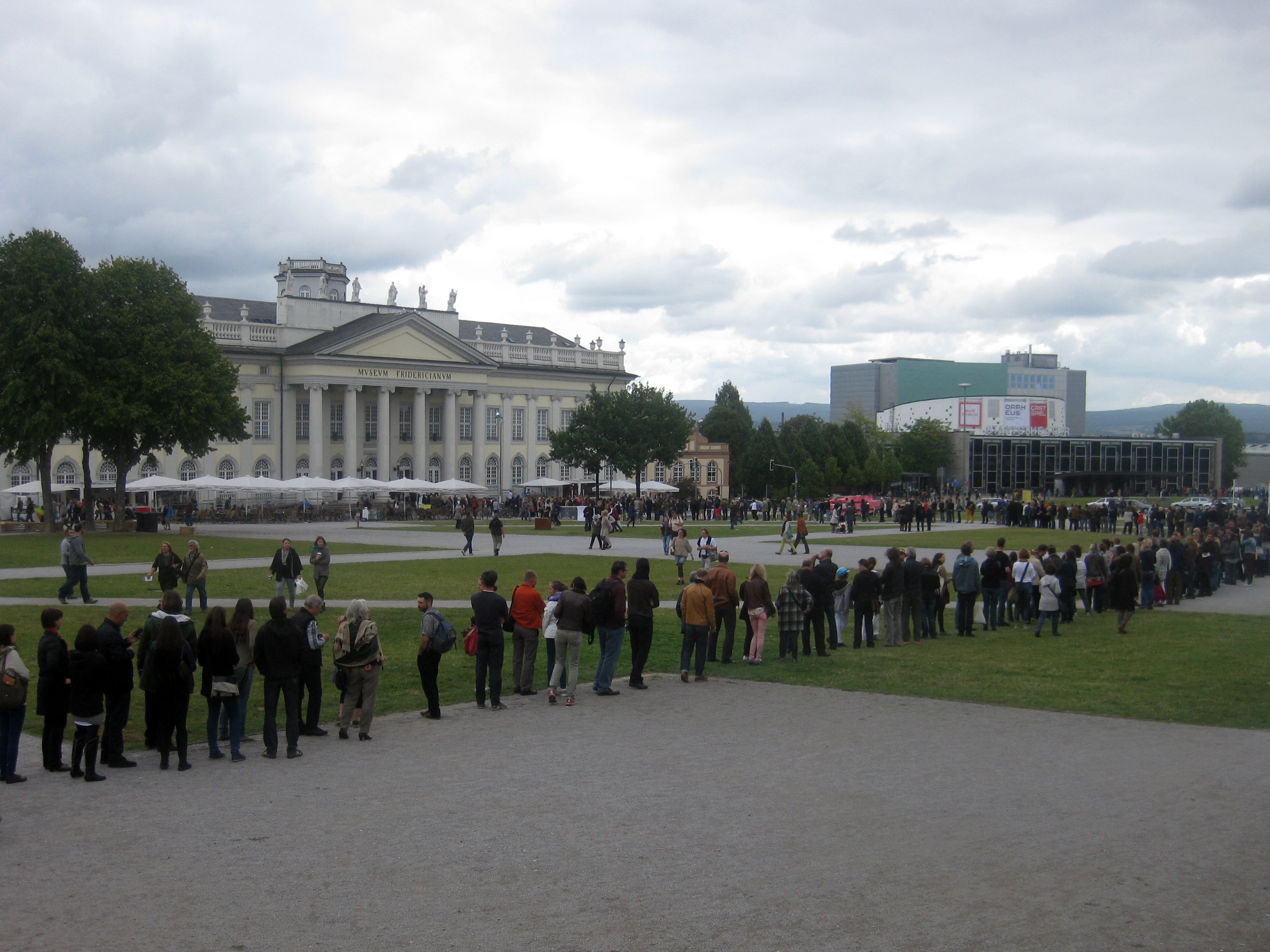
The Museum Fridericianum during the exhibition

- A Lida Abdul, Bani Abidi, Etel Adnan, Korbinian Aigner, Vyacheslav Akhunov, Barmak Akram, Khadim Ali, Jennifer Allora & Guillermo Calzadilla, Maria Thereza Alves, Francis Alÿs, Ayreen Anastas, AND AND AND, Ida Applebroog, Mohammad Yusuf Asefi, Doug Ashford, Tarek Atoui, Kader Attia
- B Alexandra Bachzetsis, Nanni Balestrini, Amy Balkin, Judith Barry, Gianfranco Baruchello, Ahmed Basiony, Thomas Bayrle, Jérôme Bel, Gordon Bennett, Rossella Biscotti, Manon de Boer, Alighiero Boetti, Anna Boghiguian, Carol Bove, Kristina Buch, Andrea Büttner, Gerard Byrne
- C CAMP (founded 2007 from Shaina Anand, Sanjay Bhangar and Ashok Sukumaran), Janet Cardiff and George Bures Miller, Emily Carr, Mariana Castillo Deball, Paul Chan, Kudzanai Chiurai, Constant, Daniel Gustav Cramer, Critical Art Ensemble, Abraham Cruzvillegas, István Csákány, Attila Csörgő, Antoni Cumella
- D Salvador Dalí, Marie Darrieussecq, Tacita Dean, Mark Dion, Thea Djordjadze, Willie Doherty, Trisha Donnelly, Sam Durant, Jimmie Durham
- E Haris Epaminonda, Cevdet Erek
- F Guillermo Faivovich & Nicolás Goldberg, Matias Faldbakken, Geoffrey Farmer, Omer Fast, Lara Favaretto, Ceal Floyer, Llyn Foulkes, Abul Qasem Foushanji, Chiara Fumai
- G Rene Gabri, Ryan Gander, Dora García, Mario García Torres, Theaster Gates, Jeanno Gaussi, Mariam Ghani, Simryn Gill, Édouard Glissant, Julio González, Tue Greenfort
- H Zainab Haidary, Fiona Margaret Hall, Tamara Henderson, Susan Hiller, Horst Hoheisel, Judith Hopf, Khaled Hourani mit Amjad Ghannam and Rashid Masharawi, Pierre Huyghe
- I Sanja Iveković
- J Toril Johannessen, Joan Jonas, Brian Jungen and Duane Linklater
- K Rudolf Kaesbach, Robin Kahn & National Union of Sahrawi Women, Masood Kamandy, Amar Kanwar, William Kentridge, Hassan Khan, Erkki Kurenniemi
- L Horacio Larraín Barros, Dinh Q. Lê (in collaboration with Vũ Giáng Hương, Quang Tho, Huynh Phuong Dong, Nguyen Thu, Truong Hieu, Phan Oanh, Nguyen Toan Thi, Duong Anh, Minh Phuong, Kim Tien, Quach Phong, Nguyen Thanh Chau), Gabriel Lester, David Link, Maria Loboda, Mark Lombardi, Aníbal López, Renata Lucas, Marcos Lutyens und Raimundas Malašauskas, featuring Sissel Tolaas
- M Goshka Macuga, Anna Maria Maiolino, Catherine Malabou, Nalini Malani, Man Ray, Maria Martins, Francesco Matarrese, Fabio Mauri, Julie Mehretu, John Menick, Christoph Menke, Gustav Metzger, Lee Miller, Aman Mojadidi, Moon Kyungwon & Jeon Joonho, Gareth Moore, Giorgio Morandi, Rabih Mroué, Zanele Muholi, Christian Philipp Müller
- N Arne Nordheim, M. A. Numminen
- O Objects damaged during the Lebanese Civil War (1975–1990), Shinro Ohtake, Rahraw Omarzad, Roman Ondák, Füsun Onur, The Otolith Group
- P Christodoulos Panayiotou, Giuseppe Penone, Claire Pentecost, Hetti Perkins, Susan Philipsz, Pratchaya Phinthong, Sopheap Pich, Lea Porsager, Michael Portnoy, Margaret Preston, Seth Price, Ana Prvacki
- R Walid Raad, Michael Rakowitz, Araya Rasdjarmrearnsook, Doreen Reid Nakamarra, Pedro Reyes, Gunnar Richter, Stuart Ringholt, Ruth Robbins und Red Vaughan Tremmel, Juana Marta Rodas und Julia Isídrez, Paul Ryan, Hannah Ryggen
- S Natascha Sadr Haghighian, Anri Sala, Charlotte Salomon, Issa Samb, Ines Schaber, Tino Sehgal, Ashkan Sepahvand, Albert Serra, Tejal Shah, Wael Shawky, Zolaykha Sherzad, Nedko Solakow, Song Dong, Tamás St. Turba, Alexandra Sukhareva, Imre Szeman
- T Mika Taanila, Mohsen Taasha, Alexander Tarakhovsky, Javier Téllez, Aase Texmon Rygh, Warwick Thornton, Time/Bank (e-flux: Julieta Aranda & Anton Vidokle), Warlimpirrnga Tjapaltjarri, Rosemarie Trockel
- V Rattana Vandy, Vann Nath, Adrián Villar Rojas, Jeronimo Voss
- W Jessica Warboys, Lori Waxman, Clemens von Wedemeyer, Apichatpong Weerasethakul in collaboration with Chaisiri Jiwarangsan, Lawrence Weiner
- Y Yan Lei, Haegue Yang
- Z Akram Zaatri, Zalmaiï, Anton Zeilinger, Konrad Zuse
