= Élisabeth Lebovici =

French art historian, journalist and art critic

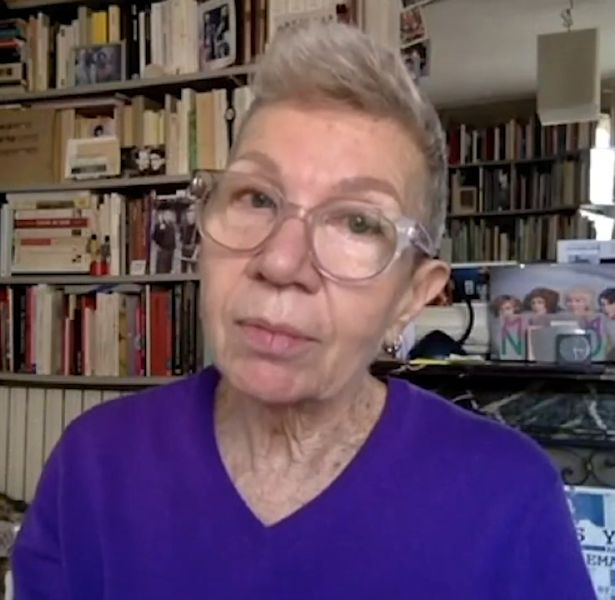
Élisabeth Lebovici

Élisabeth Lebovici (born 1953) is a French art historian, journalist, and art critic.

== Biography ==
Élisabeth Lebovici completed her studies in Paris and New York, where she was enrolled in the Independent Study Program at the Whitney Museum of American Art. In 1983, she defended her thesis L'Argent dans le discours des artistes américains, 1980-81 [Money in the discourse of American artists, 1980-81] at the Université Paris X.

In 1991, she joined the staff of the French newspaper Libération, where she worked until 2006. She was previously editor-in-chef of the magazine Beaux Arts and contributed as well to the journal art press. Since 2006 she coorganizes the seminar "Something You Should Know: artistes et producteurs" at the School for Advanced Studies in the Social Sciences in Paris.

She is particularly interested in studying genders and sexualities, and is engaged in examining the relationships between feminism, queer theory, art history, and contemporary art. Her essay on Marie Antoinette's breast ball as a camp object was published in Tobias Kaspar's 2012 catalogue Bodies in the Backdrop.

Lebovici was an advisor for Exposé·es at the Palais de Tokyo in 2023 an exhibit based on her book Ce que le sida m’a fait - Art et activisme à la fin du XXe siècle (What AIDS did to me: Art and activism at the end of the 20th century, 2017).

Élisabeth Lebovici is the author of numerous monographic studies on contemporary artists and teaches at the School for Advanced Studies in the Social Sciences. She is also an advocate for LGBT rights.

== Bibliography ==
- Ruggieri: 150 ans de feux d'artifice, with Patrick Braco, éditions Denoël, 1989.
- Annette Messager: Faire Parade, éditions Paris Musées (MAMVP), 1995, (ISBN 978-2879002279).
- Claude Cahun photographe, with François Leperlier, éditions Paris Musées et Jean-Michel Place, 1995.
- Zoe Leonard, éditions du Centre national de la photographie, 1998, (ISBN 978-2867541193).
- L'Intime, editor, éditions de l'École nationale supérieure des Beaux-Arts, 1998, (ISBN 978-2840560630).
- Philippe Thomas, with Corinne Diserens, Daniel Soutif, Jean-Philippe Antoine, and Patricia Falguières, Musée d'art contemporain de Barcelone et Le Magasin, 2000–2001.
- If on a Winter's Night... Roni Horn, with Urs Stahel, éditions Steidl Verlag, 2005, (ISBN 978-3882439113).
- Valérie Mréjen, monograph, éditions Léo Scheer, coll. Pointligneplan, 2005, (ISBN 978-2-915280-71-5).
- Georges Tony Stoll, with Dominique Baqué, éditions du Regard, 2006, (ISBN 2-84105-190-0).
- Femmes artistes/Artistes femmes: Paris, de 1880 à nos jours, with Catherine Gonnard, éditions Hazan, 2007, (ISBN 978-2754102063).
- Louise Bourgeois, with Marie-Laure Bernadac and Frances Morris, Tate Publishing (ISBN 978-1854376879), 2007; and with Jonas Storsve, Centre Pompidou, 2008, (ISBN 978-2844263551).
- Zoe Leonard: photographs, with Urs Stahel, Svetlana Alpers, and Zoe Leonard, Steidl Verlag, 2008 (ISBN 978-3865214942).
- Olga Kisseleva: Mondes croisés, éditions Archibook, 2008 (ISBN 978-2915639834).
- À Roni Horn, with Éric Mézil, éditions de la collection Lambert & Éditions Phébus, 2009, (ISBN 978-2752904270).
- Martin Szekely, éditions JPR|Ringier, 2010, (ISBN 978-3037640982).
- Nancy Spero, œuvres sur papier 1926-2009, with Jonas Storsve, éditions Gallimard/Centre Pompidou, 2010, (ISBN 978-2070130894).
- Brigit Jürgenssen, with Gabriele Schor and Heike Eipeldauer, Bank Austria Forum Sammlung/Prestel Verlag, 2010 (ISBN 978-3791351032).
- Mark Morrisroe: « in the Darkroom », with Beatrix Ruf, Thomas Seelig... JRP/Ringier, 2010, (ISBN 978-3037641217).
- Tacita Dean, the Friar's Doodle, with Lynne Cooke, Abadia de Santo Domingo de Silos/Madrid, Museo Nacional Centro de Arte Reina Sofía, Actar, 2010, (ISBN 978-8480264150).
- General Idea, Trouble dans le genre, with Frédéric Bonnet, Paris-Musées and JRP/RIngier, 2011, (ISBN 978-2759601479).
- Looking For Rosa Barba, in Rosa Barba. White is an Image, ed. Chiara Parisi and Andrea Villiani, Hatje Cantz, 2011, p. 230-235, (ISBN 978-3-7757-3019-8).
- Ce que le sida m’a fait - Art et activisme à la fin du XXe siècle, JRP|Editions 2017, (ISBN 978-3-03764-499-7).
- Katharina Grosse, in Katharina Grosse: Wunderbild, ed. Adam Budak, Verlag der Buchhandlung Walther Konig, 2018, p. 230-235, (ISBN 978-3-9609-8435-1).
- Conversation with Lili Reynaud-Dewar, in Lili Reynaud-Dewar, ed. Michele Robecchi, Phaidon, 2019, p. 230-235, (ISBN 978-0-7148-7337-4).
