= 2008 Turner Prize =

British prize for contemporary art

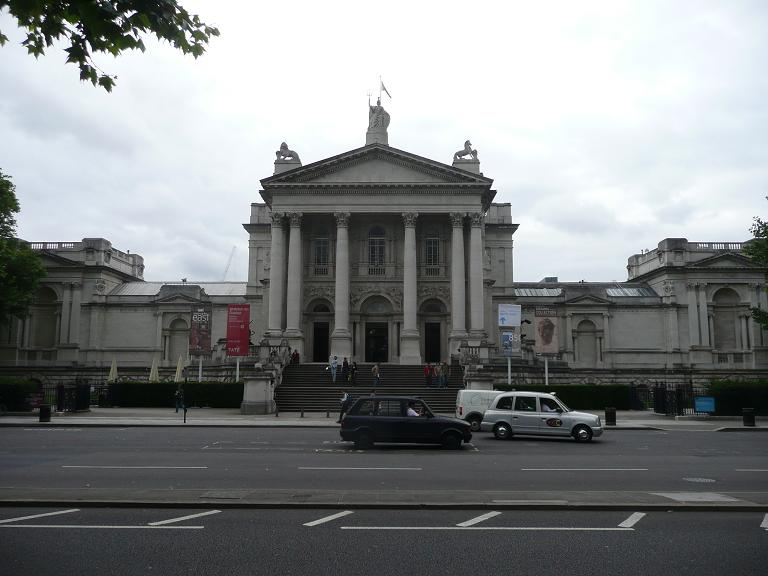
The 2008 Turner Prize nominees' exhibition was at Tate Britain, London

The 2008 Turner Prize was awarded on 1 December 2008 to Mark Leckey. The £25,000 Turner Prize is awarded by the Tate to one of four nominees and is based on their work in the previous year. The other three 2008 nominees were Runa Islam, Goshka Macuga and Cathy Wilkes; for the first time since 1998, there were three female nominees. The chairman of the jury was Stephen Deuchar, director of Tate Britain. The artwork shown by the nominees at the invitational exhibition was generally unpopular with critics.

Nicholas Serota made a short speech before the award was presented by Nick Cave. Leckey had not prepared an acceptance speech. In an interview with Channel 4 News directly following the announcement, Leckey said, "The critics like middlebrow art. I don't make middlebrow art. Sod them. If you are working as an artist nowadays, the worse place to be, in terms of critics, is Britain."

== Exhibition ==
An exhibition of work by the nominees was shown at Tate Britain from 30 September 2008 to 18 January 2009. The curator was Carolyn Kerr.

The Turner Prize is awarded for a show by the artist in the previous year. When nominees are told of their nomination, they then prepare exhibits for the Turner Prize exhibition, often at short notice. As such, the Turner Prize exhibition may not feature the works for which the artist was initially nominated by the judges. However, it tends to be the basis on which public and press judge the artist's worthiness for nomination.

== Nominees ==
There were four nominees for the prize:

- Runa Islam - nominated for her solo exhibition Centre of Gravity at the Bergen Kunsthall, Bergen and National Museum of Art, Oslo and the presentation of her work at the Venice Biennale 2007.
  - Bangladesh born, aged 37, trained both at the Rijksakademie in Amsterdam and the Royal College of Art.
- Mark Leckey - nominated for solo exhibitions Industrial Light & Magic at Le Consortium, Dijon and Resident at the Kölnischer Kunstverein, Cologne.
  - from London, aged 44, currently a film studies professor in Germany at the Städelschule in Frankfurt.
- Goshka Macuga - nominated for the solo exhibition Objects in Relation, Art Now at Tate Britain and her contribution to the 5th Berlin Biennial for Contemporary Art.
  - Polish, age 41, describes herself as a "cultural anthropologist".
- Cathy Wilkes - nominated for her solo exhibition at Milton Keynes Gallery.
  - from Glasgow, aged 42.

It was the first time since 1998 that three of the four nominees had been women.

Stephen Deuchar, who chaired the jury, said: "The prize is not there to award the most competent artist at work today, but to draw attention to what the jury considers new developments."

== Works and press coverage ==
=== Runa Islam ===
Runa Islam's exhibited works were three films:

- First Day of Spring
  - A film shot in Dhaka, Bangladesh where Islam was born. It shows a group of rickshaw drivers taking a rest beside a deserted avenue on the first day of spring.
- Cinematography
  - A film shot using a mechanically controlled camera programmed, in its movement, to spell out the word 'CINEMATOGRAPHY'. The footage is of a film apparatus workshop used by JC Harry Harrison (a motion-control pioneer) in New Zealand involved in the making of The Lord of the Rings. The camera moves around the location filming hardware and shelving to the sound of motor noises.
- Be The First To see What You see As You see It
  - A film showing a dreamlike sequence of a well dressed woman approaching items of crockery placed on plinths and then gently pushing the crockery off onto the floor.

Artist's comment:

- First Day of Spring
  - "I allowed the rickshaw pullers you see to take 'center stage', to counter the marginal roles they play within the socio-economic climate."
- Cinematography
  - "I found in my notebook the sentence 'writing with the camera' and this inspired me. The word 'cinematography' is basically 'writing with movement', or better, 'to record in movement', just as photography is 'writing in light'. I wanted to write the word itself with the camera, to realize a sort of tattoo on a landscape where the starting and ending point coincide."
- Be The First To see What You see As You see It
  - The meaning [is] not prescribed (as with almost all of my works)[...] I think my work allows you to use different prisms through which to read it."

The critics said:

- (Regarding Cinematography) "without the intervention of the curator it is virtually impossible for the viewer to figure out what we are supposed to find that's interesting. This art is academic because it was made not to communicate but to be explained. It exists solely to give lecturers and gallery guides a reason to get up in the morning." "[Watching Cinematography] is torture" - The Telegraph
- "analyses the language of cinema [...] so slowly and minutely that you start to want to scream. - The Times
- "The three [films] here are slow, repetitious, and self-referential in their focus on the tediously obvious." - Financial Times
- "the Turner can still keep some dignity this year, so long as Runa Islam wins." - Jonathan Jones's blog in The Guardian
- "her work is steeped in film theory and very skilfully edited. But it made me think of better film-artists who ought to have won." - The Observer

=== Mark Leckey ===
Mark Leckey's exhibited works were:

- Industrial Light & Magic
- Felix gets Broadcasted
- Made in 'Eaven
- Cinema-in-the-Round
  - A 40-minute lecture delivered by Leckey wearing evening dress, in which he explains why he finds some aspects of contemporary art effective and covers such subjects as cats, James Cameron's Titanic, images and objects.

The critics said:

- (Regarding Cinema-in-the-Round) "it was gratifying to see that even members of the live audience were talking and getting up to leave." - The Daily Telegraph
- "comes closest to capturing the chaotic flux of the contemporary - or at least he was the artist who most succeeded in making me feel old." - The Times
- "Mark Leckey, must win if only because here at last were glimmers of wit ... with energy and a colourful response to a visually overloaded world." - Financial Times
- "Diverting in small doses, on a large scale it is exposed as minor art." - The Guardian

=== Goshka Macuga ===
Goshka Macuga's exhibited works were:

- Deutsches Volk—Deutsche Arbeit
  - A glass and steel construction in a limited spiral shape.
- House der Frau 1
- House der Frau 2
- Different Sky (Rain)

Macuga's works incorporated photographs by surrealist Paul Nash and drawings by his mistress Eileen Agar. There were also sculptures utilising work by Mies van der Rohe and Lilly Reich made in glass and steel.

The critics said:

- "sterile work" - The Daily Telegraph
- "rather beautiful...oddly moving" - The Guardian
- "She has delved into the Tate archives to produce a counter-history of surrealism and modern design with devastatingly dull consequences." - Jonathan Jones in The Guardian
- "[Her work] has the theatricality of a bike-rack outside an office window ... as visually intriguing as an airport lobby." - The Times
- "dowdy, obscure and over-formal" - Financial Times
- "cold, colourless and short-lived" - The Observer

=== Cathy Wilkes ===
Cathy Wilkes' exhibited work was:

- I Give You All My Money
  - Two female mannequins in a scene somewhat like a supermarket checkout. One mannequin sits naked on a lavatory with items dangling from her head: a nurse's cap, rusty horseshoes, a deflated balloon, charred bits of wood. The other's head is enclosed in a bird cage. The scene is covered with detritus: unwashed bowls and spoons with porridge and salad dried on. The everyday items are from the artist's own home, as are the leftovers. Wilkes says of her work that it "apprehends an end point in our understanding of things as they are—a point at which words become insufficient, and the naming of objects is disconnected from our experience of them."

The critics said:

- "Wilkes is using a surrealistic vocabulary that was out of date in 1940, [and] her take on feminism is one that ... Betty Friedan would have recognised 40 years ago." - The Daily Telegraph
- "Wilkes' art is a poke in the eye, a sort of curse. She goes on and on doing the same thing, and her insistence is telling and painful." - The Guardian
- "I can't believe that what looks like so-so student work made it onto the shortlist." - Jonathan Jones in The Guardian
- "a sinister Tracey Emin spinning strangely fetishistic, idiosyncratic tales." - The Times
- "[a] feeble piece" - Financial Times
- "[I]t is too busy hammering its point home with all the didacticism of a fifth-form project" - The Observer

== Critics' reception of the exhibition as a whole ==
Coverage was mostly negative. Richard Dorment wrote in The Daily Telegraph: "The shortlist for this year's Turner Prize is so wilfully opaque it's irrelevant." In his opinion the artists selected exemplified "Euro-art, a term I've made up to describe a certain kind of technically competent, bland, and ultimately empty art made specifically for international biennales." Similarly, Jonathan Jones wrote in The Guardian that the show "reflect[ed] a mentality only too dominant in art magazines and curating right now—a rather overthought, overtalked, pseudo-intellectual culture." In The Times, Rachel Campbell-Johnston wrote, "I can't help thinking that this show will prove ... like the returns desk of Ikea on a Monday morning. Lots of frustrated people will be left staring at a pile of inscrutable junk." In the Financial Times, Jackie Wullschlager wrote, "Don’t go. Don’t even think about going. This year’s Turner Prize exhibition is without competition the worst in the history of the award.... a killer mix of self-indulgence and academicism." Laura Cumming in The Observer agreed, "If ever you were thinking of giving the Turner Prize a miss then 2008 is the ideal year." saying that "[i]t is not that the art is wilfully bad ... it is just that it is almost entirely inactive." In contrast, Adrian Searle wrote in The Guardian: "[T]here's a depth and complexity [in the Turner exhibition] that, it would be nice to think, might overtake the usual chat about winners and losers."

Outside the exhibition, the Stuckists art group handed out leaflets with the message "The Turner Prize is Crap", to protest the lack of figurative painting.
