= Anna Boghiguian =

Egyptian contemporary artist

- Born: 1946 (age 79–80); Cairo, Egypt
- Education: The American University in Cairo; Concordia University

Anna Boghiguian (born 1946) is an Egyptian contemporary artist. One of Egypt's foremost contemporary artists, her work investigates various historical events in a political context, such as the history of the cotton trade, the salt trade and the life of Egyptian Greek poet Constantine P. Cavafy. Her work frequently takes the form of vast installations composed of painted figures that are arranged to fill rooms.

== Early life and education ==
Anna Boghiguian was born in Cairo, Egypt, in 1946 and has Armenian roots. She studied political and social science at the American University in Cairo, Egypt and holds a BFA in fine arts and music from Concordia University in Montreal, Canada. She is a traveling artist and has constantly moved between different cities across the globe.

== Career ==
After a showing at the 2012 edition of Documenta, Boghiguian won the Golden Lion for her Armenian Pavilion at the 2015 Venice Biennale.

In 2017, she had solo exhibitions at Castello di Rivoli and Index—The Swedish Contemporary Art Foundation, Stockholm. She has been nominated for the 8th edition of the Artes Mundi award, one of the largest contemporary art prize in the UK.

In 2023, Boghiguian was awarded the Wolfgang Hahn Prize, granted by the Museum Ludwig.

Boghiguian was the subject of a solo show at the Power Plant in Toronto in October 2023.

== Works ==
Her works have been part of several international group exhibitions, including:

- Guggenheim, Abu Dhabi
- The Art Institute of Chicago
- Documenta 13, Kassel (2012)
- New Museum, New York (2014)
- São Paulo Biennial (2014)
- Van Abbemuseum, Eindhoven (2015)
- The Armenian Pavilion at the Venice Biennial (2015)
- Istanbul Biennial (2015)
- Centro dos de Mayo, Madrid (2016)
- MoMA (2017)
- Castello di Rivoli Museo d’Arte Contemporanea, Torino (2019)

Solo exhibitions:

- Van Abbemuseum, Eindhoven
- Carré d'Art (2016)
- Index – The Swedish Contemporary Art Foundation (2017)
- Museum der Moderne Salzburg (2018)
- New Museum (2018)
- Tate St. Ives (2019)
- SMAK (2020)
