= James Richards (artist) =

British artist (born 1983)

James Richards (born 1983) is a Welsh artist who lives in Berlin and London. Born in Cardiff, he studied Fine Art at Chelsea College of Art & Design, London.

In May 2014, Richards was nominated for the Turner Prize for Rosebud, a 13-minute black and white video that includes video clips and photographs taken from erotic books in a Tokyo library, all of which have had the genitalia scratched out to comply with censorship laws. In 2013, Rosebud was included in the 55th Venice Biennale, Il Palazzo Enciclopedico (The Encyclopedic Palace), curated by Massimiliano Gioni. In 2017, he was featured in the Whitney Biennial, and represented Wales at the 56th Venice Biennale.

He has been the subject of solo exhibitions at institutions including the Institute of Contemporary Arts, London; Castello di Rivoli, Turin; Haus Mödrath, Kerpen; and Secession, Vienna (with Leslie Thornton).

In April 2023, Richards was announced as a winner of the Preis der Nationalgalerie 2024. He previously received the 2014 Ars Viva Prize and the 2012 Jarman Award.
