= Lili Reynaud-Dewar =

French installation and performance artist

Lili Reynaud-Dewar (born 1975 in La Rochelle) is a French installation and performance artist. She currently lives and works in Grenoble and Geneva. Her work has been exhibited in many international surveys, including the 5th Berlin Biennale (2008), the 3rd Paris Triennale (2012), the 12th Lyon Biennale (2013), the 5th Marrakech Biennial (2014), the 56th Venice Biennial (2015), the 31st Ljubljana Biennial of Graphic Arts (2015) and the 11th Gwangju Biennale (2016). Her practice includes film, installation, performance, text and sculpture, and is mainly concerned with the "boundaries of biography".

== Life and work ==
Reynaud-Dewar studied ballet with Colette Milner at the Conservatoire de La Rochelle, then Public Law at the University of Paris I Panthéon Sorbonne. In 2001, she enrolled for a Master in Fine Arts at the Glasgow School of Arts. During the years immediately after her MA, she mostly devoted herself to writing about art in various magazines and artist's monographs and producing sculptural installations which functioned as sets for her performances.

Her first performance in 2005, at the Centre d'art Mira Phalaina in Montreuil involved her Glasgow friend Mary Knox. Knox was reading a text by Reynaud-Dewar which described the life of rasta icon and maroon leader Queen Mother Nanny of the Maroons. Since then, she works with her friends, family (her mother Mireille Rias is in many of her shows and performances including Interpretation at Kunsthalle Basel) and her students. In 2009, she turned to film and performance as her primary mediums, using them as commentary on racial issues like for example with Black Mariah (2009) and Cleda's Chairs (2010). In 2011, she initiated in her studio her dance video series which she keeps producing to this day and which see her, painted in various colors from black to red, white or silver, dancing naked alone in the various spaces where her work is made or exhibited. She has investigated the boundaries of biography, and has developed her work around various historical figures of transgression such as Josephine Baker, Cosey Fanni Tutti, Sun Ra, Jean Genet and Guillaume Dustan. She dedicated her Venice Biennial piece "Small Modest Bad Blood Opera" to the conflict that opposed Guillaume Dustan to Act Up at the end of the 1990s.

In 2009, she co-founded, with Dorothée Dupuis and Valérie Chartrain, the art and entertainment feminist publication Petunia.

In 2021, she benefited from an artist residency at Cité internationale des arts, in Paris.

In 2015, she published a collection of her writings "My Epidemic, texts on my work and the work of other artists" with Paraguay Press. She has been a professor at Haute École d'Art et de Design in Geneva since 2010, her seminar which she held for a long time from her hotel room at Hotel Adriatica in Geneva is entitled Teaching as Teenagers and is mostly based on readings by queer and feminist writers. With her students from Head Geneva, she has made a horror comedy in Marfa, TX, entitled "Beyond the Land of Minimal Possessions" and which deals with the gentrification brought by art institutions. She is part of the group Wages For Wages Against, a campaign launched by Ramaya Tegegne, that promotes fees for artists as well as a less discriminating art world, in Switzerland and elsewhere. She has initiated the project Maladie d'Amour in her studio in Grenoble in 2015. Maladie d'Amour is a social and emotional experiment that brings a small group of young people around one-night long exhibitions featuring Lili Reynaud-Dewar's artist friends such as Thomas le Lann, Marina Faust, Ian Wooldridge, Helene Cayet, Matthis Collins, Bonny Poon, and Hugo Scibetta.

In 2021, she won the 21st edition of the Marcel Duchamp Prize.

Lili Reynaud-Dewar is represented by Clearing Gallery in Brussels and New York, and Emanuel Layr in Vienna and Rome.

== Solo exhibitions ==
- 2005: Eggnogs & Flips, Public, Paris (collaborative project with Fiona Jardine).
- 2008: Explorations in French Psychedelia, CAPC musée d'art contemporain de Bordeaux, Bordeaux.
- 2008: LOVE = U.F.O, Fonds régional d'art contemporain d'Aquitaine (Frac), Bordeaux.
- 2010: Antiteater, Fonds régional d'art contemporain de Champagne-Ardenne, Reims.
- 2010: Interpretation, Kunsthalle Basel.
- 2011: Black Mariah, Centre d'art contemporain du parc Saint-Léger
- 2011: En réalité le sphinx est-il une annexe du monument ou le monument une annexe du sphinx ?, Centre Culturel Bellegarde, Toulouse.
- 2011: Fours Walls Speaking of Revolt, Media and Beauty, Tramway, Glasgow (performance).
- 2011: Cleda's Chairs, Kunstverein Bielefeld, Bielefeld.
- 2012: Fours Walls Speaking of Revolt, Media and Beauty, Serpentine Cinema, London (performance).
- 2012: Ceci est ma maison / This is my place, Le Magasin - Centre National d'Art Contemporain, Grenoble.
- 2013: Enseigner comme des adolescents - Teaching as teenagers, Le Consortium, Dijon.
- 2014: Live Through That ?!!, Outpost, Norwich.
- 2014: Live Through That ?!!, Index - The Swedish Contemporary Art Foundation, Stockholm.
- 2014: Live Through That ?!!, New Museum, New York.
- 2016: I Sing The Body Electric, Clearing, New York
- 2016: I Sing The Body Electric, Contemporary Art Museum St. Louis, Saint Louis, Missouri
- 2016: Teeth Gums Machines Future Society, Kunstverein in Hamburg, Germany.
- 2016: Teeth Gums Machines Future Society, New Settings, Théâtre Nanterre-Amandiers, Nanterre (performance)
- 2017: Teeth Gums Machines Future Society, Vleeshal Middelburg, Middleburg, The Netherlands
- 2017: Teeth Gums Machines Future Society, Museion, Bolzano
- 2017: Beyond the Land of Minimal Possessions, Artpace, San Antonio, Texas, USA.
- 2018: My Epidemic, A Body as Public as A Book Can Be, Asakusa, Tokyo.
- 2018: Oops, I think I may have lost my lighter somewhere on the ground. Could someone come down here and help me find it ?, KUB Billboards, Kunsthaus Bregenz, Austria.
- 2018: Teeth Gums Machines Future Society, Monash University Museum of Art, Melbourne, Australia.

== Selected bibliography ==
- Reynaud-Dewar, Lili, Élisabeth Lebovici, Diedrich Diederichsen, Monika Szewczyk, Lili Reynaud-Dewar, Phaidon, London, 2019
- Reynaud-Dewar, Lili, Teeth, Gums, Machines, Future, Society, Hatje Cantz, Berlin, 2018.
- Reynaud-Dewar, Lili, My Epidemic: Texts about My Work and the Work of Other Artists, Paraguay Press, Paris, 2015.
- Reynaud-Dewar, Lili, Live Through That ?!, New Museum, New York, 2015
- Reynaud-Dewar, Lili, Ceci est ma maison, This is my place, Magasin, Grenoble, 2014
- Reynaud-Dewar, Lili, Lili Reynaud Dewar: Interpretation, Paraguay Press, Paris; Kunsthalle Basel, Bâle, 2013.
- Reynaud-Dewar, Lili, Perav Prod: Marque Déposée/Registered Trademark, Michel Baverey, Paris, 2003.
