= Goshka Macuga =

Polish contemporary artist

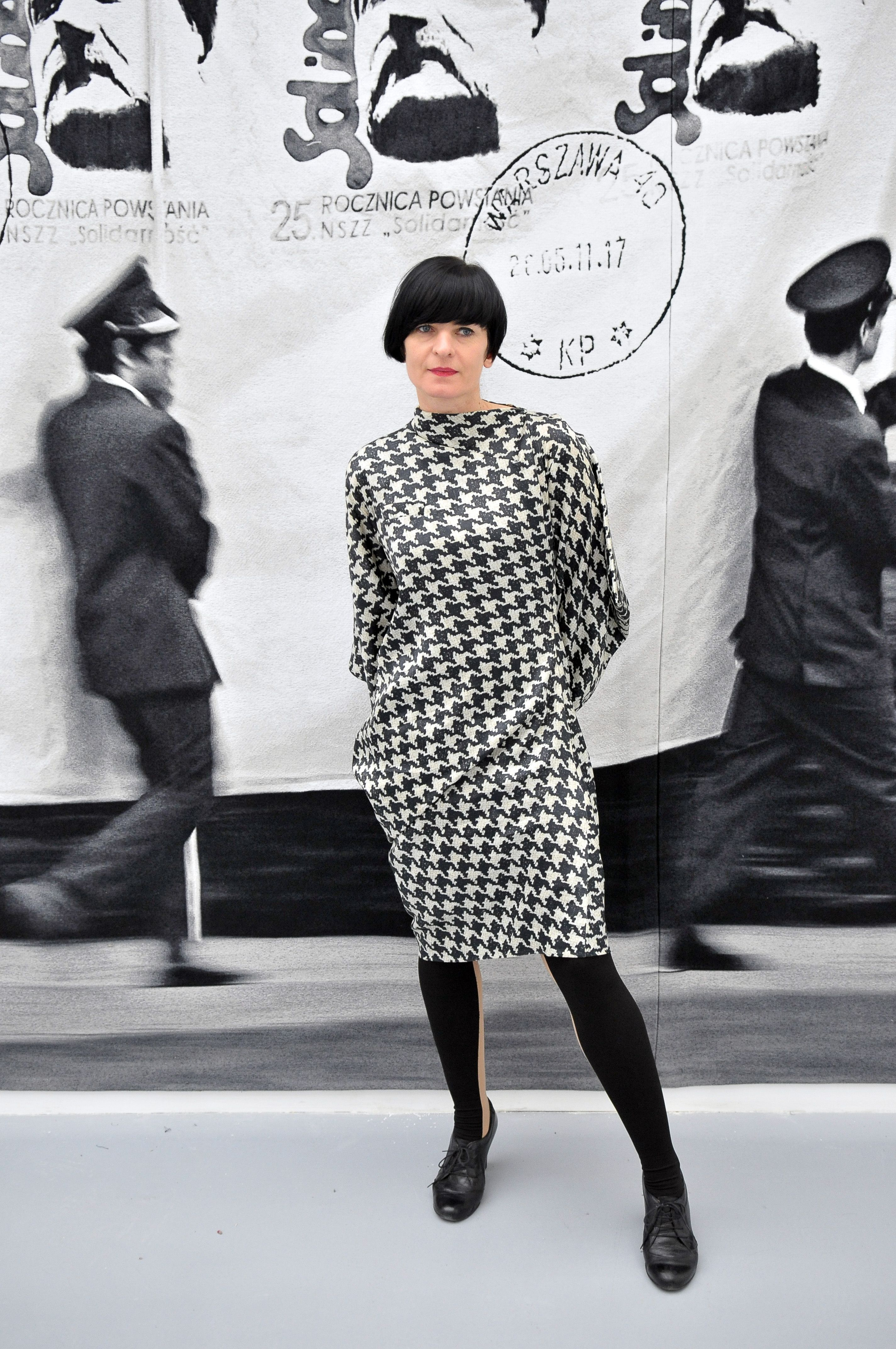
Goshka Macuga

Goshka Macuga (Note: In Polish her first name would be spelled Gośka, a common diminutive form of Małgorzata, equivalent to the English "Margaret".) RA (Polish: [ˈgɔɕka maˈtsuga]; born 1967 in Warsaw, Poland as Małgorzata Macuga) is an artist based in London. She was one of the four nominees for the 2008 Turner Prize.

== Early life and education ==
Macuga was born in Poland. She is a graduate of Central St. Martins College of Art and Design and Goldsmiths, University of London.

== Work ==
Macuga works across mediums from Jacquard woven tapestries to sculptures and robotics. Macuga is known for taking on the role of a curator and archivist within her practice, as her installations often incorporate other artists’ work alongside a variety of disparate objects. Macuga's work is commonly made for the specific institution in which it will be shown, her place-based installations involve many months worth of historical research and have been considered rich storytelling devices.

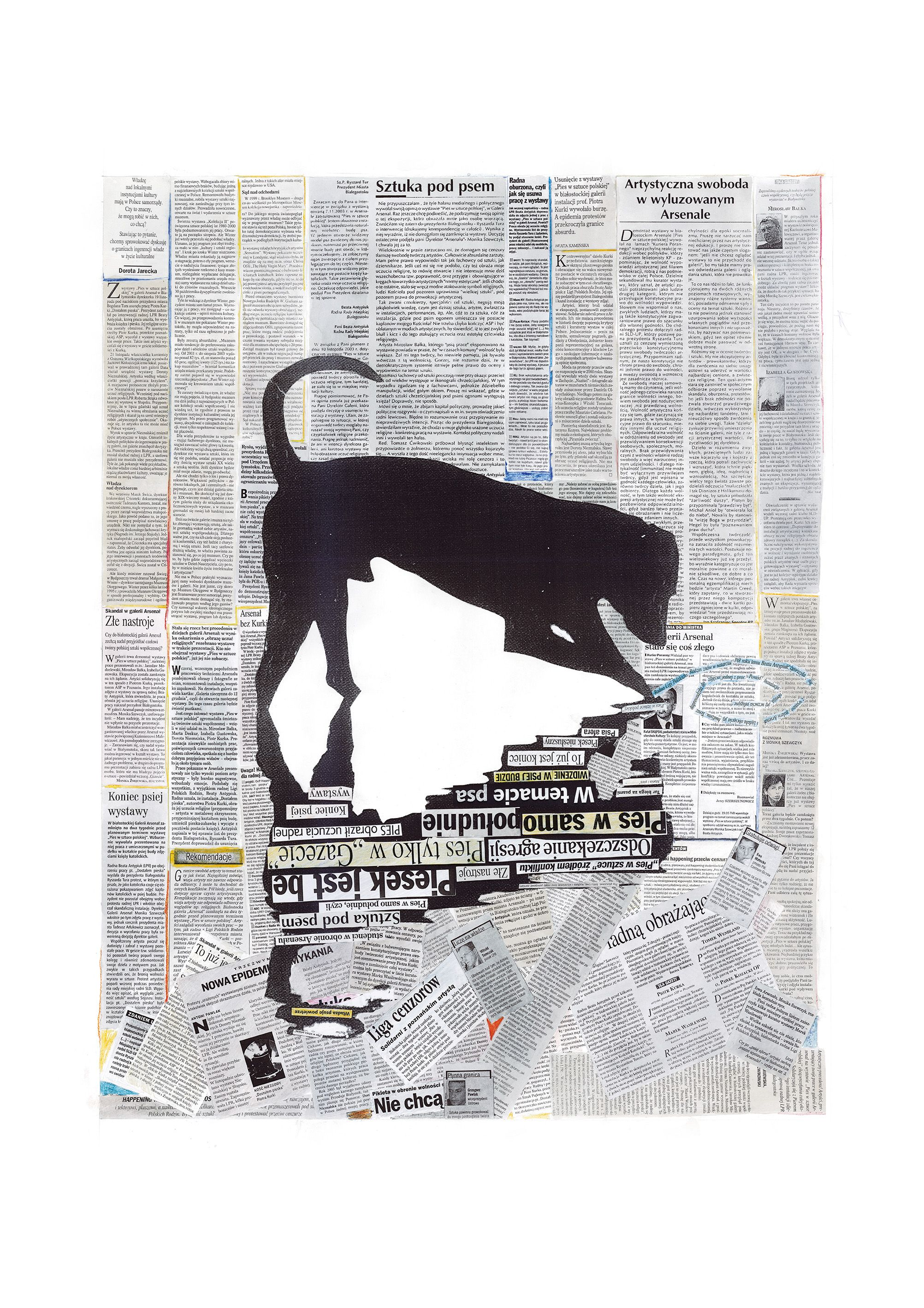
Goshka Macuga, Pies

In 2009 Macuga had an exhibition at the newly re-opened Whitechapel Gallery in London wherein she incorporated a 1955 tapestry version of Picasso’s 1937 antiwar painting Guernica into a year-long installation about the 1930s-era controversy generated by the original painting. After 24 years on display just outside the Security Council at the Headquarters of the United Nations, the tapestry commissioned by Nelson Rockefeller was removed and loaned to Whitechapel for Macuga's installation. Along with the borrowed tapestry, Macuga made a bronze cubist sculpture of Colin Powell, a documentary film, sourced a handwoven Middle Eastern rug, and installed a conference table. As part of the installation, Macuga invited groups to hold meetings in the space free of charge.

While in residence at the Walker Art Center in 2010-11, Macuga produced work for her first solo show in the United States that would investigate the cultural and political context of the Walker Art Center itself. Culminating in the exhibition, It Broke From Within, Macuga investigated the history of the shaping of the Walker Art Center as an institution through its archives. The exhibition explored the political orientation, community theory, lumber, financial history, and serendipity of clerical errors concerning the Walker. Macuga designed enormous woven tapestries of photographs taken in Minnesota's oldest pine forests and used the textile as a backdrop for select pieces from the Walker's permanent collection, including works from Marcel Duchamp and Joseph Beuys.

In 2012 Macuga created two large photorealistic tapestries for dOCUMENTA (13), one was displayed in Kassel, Germany and its counterpart in Kabul, Afghanistan. The two-part work called Of what is, that it is; of what is not, that it is not is to be exhibited simultaneously but never together in the same place. Part 1 depicts a diverse crowd of Afghans and Westerners in front of Darul Aman Palace outside of Kabul, Afghanistan. Part 2, originally exhibited in Kabul, shows a photoshopped collage of an art-world crowd and protesters gathering outside of the Orangerie in Kassel. Macuga's composition technique of collaging together historical photographs and subsequently having the image woven into a unified textile allows her to 'illuminate the elusive relationship between historic documentation and truth'.

In 2018, Macuga was commissioned by Norway’s parliament in Oslo to create a 3D tapestry containing political overtones and references to humans’ destruction of the environment.

== Other activities ==
In October 2024, fashion brand Miu Miu featured Macuga’s installation Salt Looks Like Sugar in its spring/summer 2025 showcase at Palais d'Iéna during Paris Fashion Week, including actors Willem Dafoe and Hilary Swank as models. Also sponsored by Miu Miu, Macuga worked with curator Elvira Dyangani Ose on conceiving Tales & Tellers, a five-day event re-enacting the fashion brand's series of short films, as part of Art Basel Paris's public program at Palais d'Iéna.

== Recognition ==
In December 2023, Macuga was elected to the Royal Academy of Arts in London.

== Exhibitions (selection) ==
2011

- Untitled, Zachęta National Gallery of Art, Warsaw
- It Broke from Within, Walker Art Center, Minneapolis

2012

- Exhibit, A, Museum of Contemporary Art, Chicago
- Kate MacGarry, London
- Untitled, Andrew Kreps Gallery, New YorkShowroom, Galerie Rüdiger Schöttle, Munich
- dOCUMENTA (13), Fridericianum, Kassel and Queen's Palace, Bagh-e Babur, Kabul

=== 2013 ===
- Non-Consensual Act (in Progress), Index – The Swedish Contemporary Art Foundation, Stockholm
- Sexuality of Atoms, Andrew Kreps Gallery, New York

2014

- Goshka Macuga Tapestries, Lunds konsthall, Lund
- 8th Berlin Biennale, Dahlem Museums, Berlin

2016

- Time as Fabric, New Museum, New York
- To the Son of Man Who Ate the Scroll, Fondazione Prada, Milan

== See also ==
- List of Turner Prize winners and nominees
