= John Menick =

American artist (born 1976)

- Born: 1976 (age 49–50)
- Education: Cooper Union (BFA)
- Occupations: Artist; writer
- Website: johnmenick.com

John Menick (born 1976) is an American artist and writer working primarily in the moving image, fiction, and essay form.

== Education ==
Menick received his BFA from the Cooper Union for the Advancement of Science and Art.

== Work ==
Menick's work focuses primarily on the history and circulation of images. His experimental videos and audio works have been exhibited and screened at documenta (13); MoMA PS1; Palais de Tokyo; the International Film Festival, Rotterdam; Wattis Institute for Contemporary Arts; Witte de With Center for Contemporary Art; among other venues. His short fiction as well as his writings on cinema, politics, and technology have been published in Mousse Magazine, N+1, BOMB, Spike Art Quarterly, Frieze, Art in America, and Witte de With Review. In 2012, as part of documenta (13), he published his first collection of fiction and essays, A Report on the City. His videos are included in the collection of the Kadist Art Foundation, as well as the collection of Isabelle and Jean-Conrad Lemaître. He has been a visiting professor of film and video at the Cooper Union.
