= Masood Kamandy =

Masood Kamandy (born 1981) is an American contemporary artist. Kamandy participated in dOCUMENTA (13) in Kassel, Germany, where he presented an installation stemming from his work with students in the photography department at Kabul University, which he helped establish in 2002.

== Professional life and education ==
Kamandy received his Bachelor of Fine Arts from the School of Visual Arts and his Master of Fine Arts from the University of California, Los Angeles (UCLA). He currently lives and works in Los Angeles.

He helped found the first photography department at the University of Kabul (2002–05) and was invited to participate in dOCUMENTA (13), as well as group exhibitions at the UCLA New Wight Gallery, Los Angeles (2011), and the Control Room, Los Angeles (2011). Kamandy was included in the American Photography Annual (2010, 2008) and is an Art Director's Club "Young Gun" (2006).

Kamandy is an instructor in the Digital Media area of Pasadena City College.
