= Martí Manen =

Catalan art curator (born 1976)

- Born: 1976 (age 48–49); Barcelona
- Occupation: Curator
- Known for: Director, Index Foundation

Martí Manen (born 1976, in Barcelona) is a curator and art writer currently living in Stockholm. Since 2018 he has been the director of Index - The Swedish Contemporary Art Foundation.

He cofounded A*Desk, one of Barcelona's independent structure for art critics. Since then, he has curated exhibitions for institutions as well as for independent spaces.

He has curated projects for Museo de Historia Natural (Mexico City), Aara (Bangkok), Sala Rekalde (Bilbao), Konsthall C (Stockholm), Ca2M (Madrid), Miró Foundation (Barcelona).

In 2015 he was the curator of the Spanish Pavilion at the 56th Venice Biennale.

In 2018 he was appointed director of Index Foundation.

In 2019 he was the curator of the 10th MOMENTUM biennale in Moss, Norway.

== Publications ==
- Salir de la exposición (Consonni)
- Contarlo todo sin saber cómo (Ca2M)
- When Lines Are Time (Fundació Miró)
