= Runa Islam =

Bangladeshi-born British filmmaker

- Born: 10 December 1970 (age 55); Dhaka, East Bengal
- Education: Royal College of Art

Runa Islam (Bengali: রুনা ইসলাম; born 10 December 1970) is a Bangladeshi-born British visual artist and filmmaker based in London. She was a nominee for the 2008 Turner Prize. She is principally known for her film works.

== Early life ==
Islam was born in Dhaka, Pakistan (now Bangladesh) and moved to London aged three. She attended the Rijksakademie van Beeldende Kunsten, Amsterdam, from 1997 to 1998.

In 1999, Islam exhibited at EASTinternational which was selected by Peter Doig and Roy Arden. She completed a M.Phil at the Royal College of Art, London, in 2004.

== Career ==
Islam has been inspired by European auteurs such as Jean-Luc Godard.

In 2005, she participated in the Venice Biennale. Islam's 2006 16mm film installation Conditional Probability was the result of a residency at North Westminster Community School, in the final year before its closure. It was first exhibited at the Serpentine Gallery and was said to "imbue even the most mundane dusty corner with a little visual magic". The other artists included in the project to document the life of the school before it closed were Christian Boltanski, Faisal Abdu'allah and the architect Yona Friedman.

In 2010, the Museum of Contemporary Art, Sydney (MCA) presented Runa Islam's first solo exhibition in Australia. Works included Magical Consciousness (2010), co-commissioned by the MCA and the Musée d'art contemporain de Montréal (MACM) and Scale (1/16 Inch = 1 Foot) featuring the now demolished Trinity Square (Gateshead) multi-storey car park.

Islam says, "I feel I've got a lot to say with film. The camera can go to impossible places. It can re-articulate time. Films from other epochs allow you to go back in time. But so much of contemporary life is also envisioned through film and TV. We remember people we've never met because we've seen them on a screen."

The Museum of Modern Art held an exhibit of Islam's work in 2011, Project 95: Runa Islam, featuring films by Islam. The San Francisco Museum of Modern Art featured a solo show of Islam's work from December 2016 through April 2017, Runa Islam, Verso.

== Awards and nominations ==
In 2008, Islam was nominated for the 2008 Turner Prize.

== See also ==
- British Bangladeshi
- List of British Bangladeshis
