= King Victor and King Charles =

1842 play by Robert Browning

- Author: Robert Browning
- Language: English
- Genre: Drama
- Publisher: Edward Moxon
- Publication date: 1842
- Publication place: United Kingdom
- Media type: Print

King Victor and King Charles was the second play written by Robert Browning for the stage. He completed it in 1839 for William Macready, who had staged Strafford two years before, but Macready rejected it as unsuitable and it was never performed. It was published in 1842 as the second number of Bells and Pomegranates.

The subject of the play is the strange incident in 1730–32 in the Kingdom of Sardinia in which the elderly king, Victor Amadeus II, first abdicated in favour of his son Charles Emmanuel III, and then after months of ever-increasing complaints unexpectedly demanded to be restored. He was imprisoned until his death a year later. Browning's treatment is based on 18th century sources which cast Victor as deliberately deceptive, but he goes further to create a secret history in which Charles is exonerated from all charges of cruelty.

The play is in four acts and has only four main characters: Victor, Charles, Charles's wife Polyxena, and the minister D'Ormea. Charles suffers from an inferiority complex. He has always been regarded as the dull son, forced into the role of heir after the death of his abler brother. The theme is the anxious and misguided loyalty of Charles to his father and his refusal to believe that he could have been deceived. Despite his disappointment, his virtuous behaviour finally leads to a reconciliation.

== Plot ==
The setting is the Castle of Rivoli. There are no scene changes.

The Duchy of Savoy, comprising Savoy proper and Piedmont (today in France and Italy respectively), has been united for three centuries. Over the past decades of Victor Amadeus's rule, the House of Savoy has prospered. It has successfully defended itself against its powerful enemies during the War of the Spanish Succession, after which a treaty permitted the acquisition of Sicily in 1713. Sicily was exchanged for Sardinia in 1720. Victor, the duke turned king, has solidified his power and is now one of the most absolute monarchs in Europe.

=== 1730 ===
==== Part I ====
Polyxena is helping Charles to rehearse state speeches when they are visited briefly by the disdainful D'Ormea. Charles believes that he has been summoned to the palace to be disinherited in favour of an illegitimate son. Polyxena suggests that the King's mistress, Marchioness Sebastian, may have influenced Victor in that direction after he was widowed in 1728.

==== Part II ====
Victor soliloquises while carrying the regalia. Having foolishly made secret, incompatible deals with Austria and with Spain, he fears that a reconciliation between the two great powers will lead to the revealment of the deception, and justify the annexation of his kingdom. Nothing short of a change in ruler will extricate Sardinia from this situation, he believes. However, he has little faith in Charles, and expects to take power back from his weak son as soon as a renegotiation is complete and the coast is clear.

When Charles enters, Victor is startled by his tone of accusation, and wonders if D'Ormea (who expects to be made scapegoat) has told him anything. Victor places the crown on Charles's head and announces an intention to abdicate. He will take the name Count Tende and spend his retirement in Chambéry, 150 km away in the extreme northwest of Savoy. Charles is somewhat angry when he learns that Victor has secretly married his old mistress, but the guilt over his earlier suspicion is so great that he refuses even to consider the possibility that his father has ulterior motives for stepping down. When the baffled Polyxena suggests that all may not be as it seems, he turns away from her.

=== 1731 ===
==== Part I ====
Nearly a full year has passed. The royal pair take the waters at Evian; but Polyxena returns home, as she thinks, a day ahead, and is greeted at the palace by D'Ormea, who informs her that Victor is returning to Turin, probably to take back the crown. Charles arrives back just minutes after her, before they have time to decide on a course of action. The king believes he has foiled the rumours, and cleared his father's name, by making a formal treaty with Austria and Spain; he sent word of this to Chambéry from Evian. He still refuses to believe that his father wants to depose him; Polyxena's insistence during the past few months has alienated him from her. At first he will not even look at D'Ormea's documentary evidence, and he is dismissive of it when he reads it.

Victor enters the palace alone, and is surprised by his son while wandering about his old chamber. At first the old man is tactful, but gradually his indignation over his son's failure to adhere to his policies causes him to demand openly the return of his crown.

Polyxena and D'Ormea enter and remonstrate with him, having overheard. Victor quickly dissembles, modifying the end of his rant to make it appear that he had been complaining about his allowance and living quarters.

==== Part II ====
Word comes to D'Ormea that Victor has approached several people for help in regaining his crown. Deeply worried, D'Ormea resorts to deception. He summons Charles to tell him that his kingdom is in imminent danger of being invaded by France, as a result of demands made by the old king for French intervention in his dispute. Victor, he claims, plans to ride thither within the hour. D'Ormea presents Charles with a list of people whose movements should be watched, and a shorter list of those to be arrested. He is alarmed when Charles, calling his bluff, orders all on both lists to be arrested—including Victor. But Charles has an entirely different plan in mind. Polyxena, guessing that his resolve to continue as monarch is wavering, tries to persuade him that his duty is to defy his father, keep his crown, and accept the burden of the world's adverse judgment as a form of self-sacrifice.

Victor is seized and brought to the palace. He is defiant, but when Charles places the crown on his head he is devastated by the filial piety the gesture represents. Fully reconciled with his son, Victor takes his old seat and passes away.

== Reaction ==
Macready wrote in his diary, in the entry for 5 September 1839: "Read Browning's play on Victor, King of Sardinia—it turned out to be a great mistake. I called Browning into my room and most explicitly told him so." Arthur Symons described it as "the least interesting and valuable of Browning's plays, the thinnest in structure, the dryest in substance." Browning himself called it a "very indifferent substitute" for another play he had hoped to publish.

It was once generally accepted as historical fact that the abdication had been a ruse. However, modern historians believe that Victor sincerely intended to retire and that his subsequent behaviour was the result of a stroke, and attendant mental illness, possibly prompted by distress over the prison-like environment at Chambéry. Another former explanation, the supposed ambition and scheming of his mistress-turned-wife, was probably a cover story put out by authorities to divert blame and halt further speculation.
