= Combal.Zero =

Restaurant in Rivoli, Italy

Combal.Zero was an Italian restaurant in Rivoli, Italy, by chef Davide Scabin. The restaurant first opened in 1994 as Combal and was renamed to Combal.Zero in 2000 when it moved to the Castle of Rivoli. It occupied a wing of the castle, which dates back to before the 11th century.

== Recognition ==
Combal.Zero was consistently listed among the 100 best restaurants in the world. The restaurant earned 2 Michelin Guide stars but lost one star in 2015 and later lost all its stars in 2021, acknowledging a closure that initially was meant to be until further notice and later became permanent. The restaurant was well known for its innovative, experimental cuisine and in particular the "Cyber Egg". Restaurant magazine lauded its "hyper-creative, conceptual tasting menu".

Combal.Zero was voted 28th best in the world in 2011, having risen from the 46th place in 2007. In the 2015 rankings it fell back to 65th place. In 2018, Combal.Zero was ranked 59th on the list.
