= Federico Cerruti =

Italian art collector

Federico Cerruti

Federico Cerruti (1 January 1922 – 15 July 2015) was an Italian art collector whose collection was described by Artribune as one of the best in Europe. He told his retainers to arrange his funeral before his death became public in order to avoid the "useless gossiping and socialising crowd" attending.

== Early life ==
Federico Cerruti was born in Genoa on 1 January 1922. His family were bookbinders who moved to Turin, where the firm prospered despite its factory being destroyed by bombing during the Second World War. In 1943, Cerruti narrowly escaped death when a ship he should have been on, the battleship Roma, was sunk by German aircraft. He had a sister, Andreina Anna Cerruti, with whom he shared a love for art. She died in Turin on 18 January 2022, at the age of 98.

== Career ==
Cerruti was brought up with a strong work ethic. He studied accountancy and expanded the family business of Legatoria Industriale Torinese to one of the largest bookbinders in Italy. The firm had the contract to bind the telephone directories of Italy. He lived above the office, and only slept at the villa he had built for him, once in 50 years.

== Art collection ==
Cerruti's collection was described by Artribune as one of the best in Europe. It ranged from the Medieval period to works of the 20th Century. The first work he acquired was a drawing by the Russian Expressionist artist Wassily Kandinsky. He also owned ten works by modern Italian Metaphysical and Surrealist artist Giorgio de Chirico, which hung in the dining room of his villa. In the main bedroom were late Medieval and early Renaissance paintings by Paolo Veneziano, Sassetta, and Bergognone. Cerruti often allowed his works to be shown at exhibitions, and small groups of art lovers were allowed to view his collection.

Appropriately, Cerruti also collected books in fine bindings. He owned the Atlas Maior by Joan Blaeu in 12 volumes and an edition of À la recherche du temps perdu in an Art Deco design by Pierre Legrain.

== Death ==
Cerruti died on 15 July 2015. He never married and left no descendants. He was interred with an ivory crucifix and photographs of his mother and Padre Pio.

== Legacy ==
Around 2013, Cerruti created the Fondazione FC in which he vested his collection and villa, as well as a capital sum. According to the terms of his will, Cerutti's extraordinary collection is now managed by the nearby contemporary museum Castle of Rivoli, and, after 4 May 2019, open to the public.
