= Rivoli Castle =

Castle in Rivoly, Metropolitan City of Turin, Italy

Coordinates: 45°04′12″N 7°30′37″E

- Castello di Rivoli
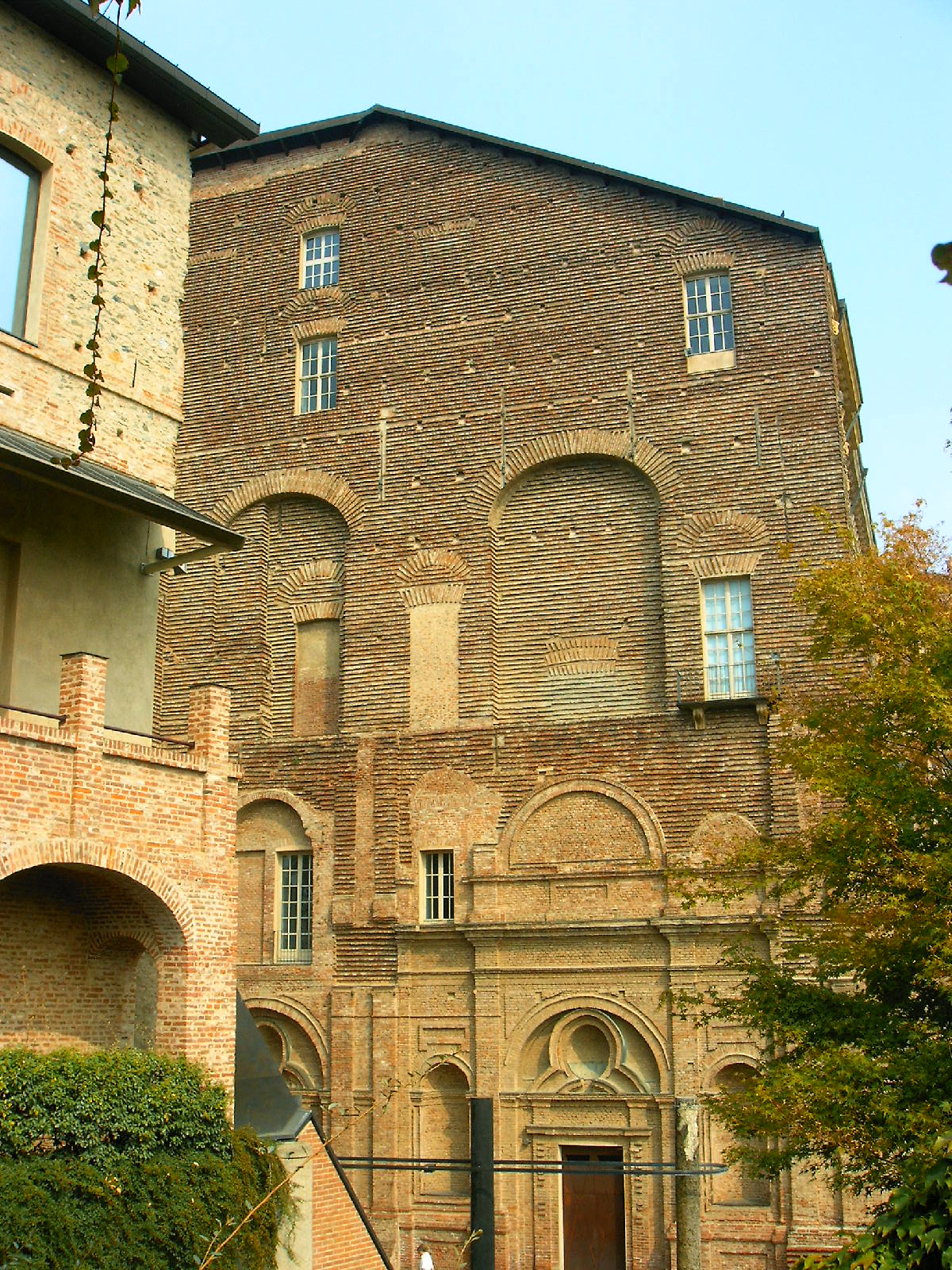
- The castle's unfinished façade

General information
- Location: Rivoli

UNESCO World Heritage Site
- Criteria: (i)(ii)(iv)(v)
- Reference: 823bis
- Inscription: 1997 (21st Session)

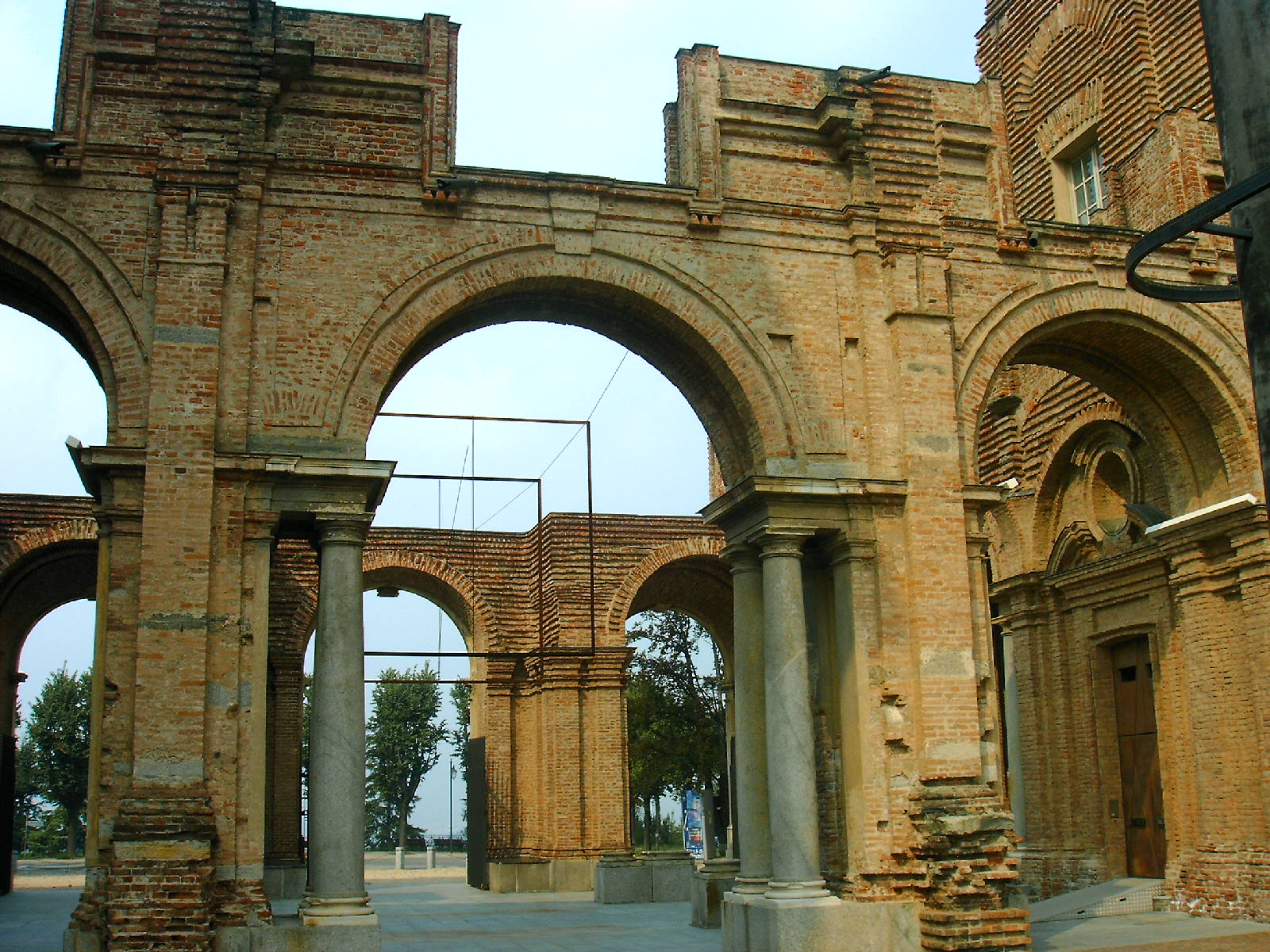
Remains of the connection between Juvarra's section and the Manica Lunga.

The Rivoli Castle is a former Residence of the Royal House of Savoy in Rivoli (Metropolitan City of Turin, Italy). It is currently home to the Castello di Rivoli – Museo d'Arte Contemporanea, the museum of contemporary art of Turin.

In 1997, it was placed on the UNESCO World Heritage Site list along with 13 other residences of the House of Savoy.

== History ==
The castle was probably built in the 9th–10th centuries. Its existence is mentioned for the first time in 1159, in a diploma by Emperor Frederick Barbarossa that ceded the Rivolese territories to the bishops of Turin.

The House of Savoy acquired Rivoli in the 11th century. Soon afterwards, a feud began with the bishops, which in 1184 resulted in damage to the castle. In 1273 King Edward I of England visited, returning from crusade to England, he was met by the Count of Savoy's messengers before travelling on to Susa and the Mont Cenis on the way to visit Count Philip I at Saint-Georges-d'Espéranche. In 1330 Amadeus VI of Savoy allowed the Consiglio dei Principi, which is the senior administrative council of the countryside, to occupy it. The castle was the first place of public veneration of the Shroud of Turin.

The castle then experienced a period of decline. In 1559, the Treaty of Cateau-Cambrésis forbade Emmanuel Philibert, Duke of Savoy from residing in Turin until he had a male child. He therefore resided in the Castle of Rivoli, having it restored by architect Ascanio Vitozzi. In 1562 his heir Charles Emmanuel I was born, and he returned to Turin. Works on Vitozzi's designs were brought on until 1644 under Carlo and Amedeo di Castellamonte, with the construction of the so-called Manica Lunga, intended to house the Savoy Gallery, the sole 17th-century part of the edifice still visible today. Numerous works of art were stolen by French troops in the following years.

At the beginning of the 18th century, the castle and the Manica Lunga were set on fire and sacked by the French, due to the War of the Spanish Succession. After the siege of 1706, Victor Amadeus II regained possession of the territories and ordered the restructuring of the damage suffered, first entrusting the work to Michelangelo Garove, who enlarged the "Manica Lunga", then, after his death, to Antonio Bertola. The latter followed the construction sites for another three years, until Filippo Juvarra intervened in 1716; the famous architect in fact had a grandiose project in mind, but the works were not completed. Only the extensions of the two eastern symmetrical wings were finished, but an unfinished façade was left. In 1730, Victor Amadeus II lived his madness here: despite having abdicated in favor of his son, he refused to let go of business and tried to oust Charles Emmanuel III of Sardinia, who, in concert with his minister, Carlo Vincenzo Ferrero d'Ormea, decided to lock up his father in the residence in Rivoli. For that occasion, the building was modified again: gratings were added to the windows and the access to the Manica Lunga was closed. Then in 1794, some alterations were carried out by Carlo Randoni, for at least partial use of the residence.

=== 19th century and onward ===
Victor Amadeus II commissioned a new façade from Filippo Juvarra, which also went unfinished. After his abdication and failed attempt to regain power from his son Charles Emmanuel III, Victor Amadeus lived here as a prisoner with his morganatic spouse the Marchesa di Spigno. After his death, the castle remained mostly abandoned, until in 1863, when the comune of Rivoli turned it into barracks. Twenty years later a section was used as library.

The edifice was heavily damaged during World War II, and remained in a substantial state of abandon until 1979, when new works of restoration were begun. In 1984 the castle was reopened as the home of the Museo d'Arte Contemporanea, the first contemporary art museum in Italy. In 2000, the castle also became home to a Michelin-starred restaurant when chef Davide Scabin moved his restaurant Combal there, renaming it Combal.Zero.

== Renovation projects ==
The first post-World War II renovation works were carried out under the Turin architect Andrea Bruno. Unfortunately, the initiative was not completed, available funding being enough only repair of structural damage. In 1967, Bruno proceeded to break down the decaying parts of the atrium, built at the beginning of 900 AD.

=== Exhibitions ===
Since its launch, Castello di Rivoli has presented an ongoing programme within its Baroque architecture and offsite, including solo shows, special commissions as well as group exhibitions featuring important Italian and International contemporary artists of the 20th and 21st centuries, such as: aaajiao, Carla Accardi, Franz Ackermann, Francis Alÿs, Carl Andre, Karel Appel, Stefano Arienti, Ed Atkins, Yuri Ancarani, Giovanni Anselmo, Francis Bacon, Bernd & Hilla Becher, Vanessa Beecroft, Anna Boghiguian, Candice Breitz, Sophie Calle, Pier Paolo Calzolari, Janet Cardiff, Maurizio Cattelan, Gianni Colombo, Claudia Comte, Anton Corbijn, Enzo Cucchi, Merce Cunningham, Roberto Cuoghi, Thomas Demand, Raymond Depardon, Jan Dibbets, Patrizio Di Massimo, Marlene Dumas, Olafur Eliasson, Max Ernst, Bruna Esposito, Luciano Fabro, Lara Favaretto, Teresita Fernández, Lucio Fontana, Yang Fudong, Anna Gaskell, Frank O. Gehry, Mario Giacomelli, Alberto Giacometti, Gilbert & George, Nan Goldin, Dan Graham, Andreas Gursky, Keith Haring, Mona Hatoum, Susan Hiller, Roni Horn, Pierre Huyghe, Anne Imhof, Arata Isozaki, Francesco Jodice, Joan Jonas, On Kawara, William Kentridge, Martin Kippenberger, Per Kirkeby, Franz Kline, Joseph Kosuth, Jannis Kounellis, James Lee Byars, Nalini Malani, Piero Manzoni, John McCracken, Ana Mendieta, Bertrand Lavier, Renato Leotta, Richard Long, Mario Merz, Joan Mirò, Carlo Mollino, Bruce Nauman, Shirin Neshat, Max Neuhaus, Pedro Neves Marques, Helmut Newton, Claes Oldenburg, Uriel Orlow, Giulio Paolini, Philippe Parreno, Giuseppe Penone, Elizabeth Peyton, Paola Pivi, Arnulf Rainer, Michael Rakowitz, Robin Rhode, James Richards, Thomas Ruff, Anri Sala, Doris Salcedo, David Salle, Thomas Schütte, Marinella Senatore, Wael Shawky, Cally Spooner, Hannah Starkey, Haim Steinbach, Hito Steyerl, Keiichi Tahara, Alessandra Tesi, Armando Testa, Wolfgang Tillmans, Grazia Toderi, Coosje van Bruggen, Paloma Varga Weisz, Emilio Vedova, Jan Vercruysse, Francesco Vezzoli, Andy Warhol, Lawrence Weiner, Andro Wekua, Joel-Peter Witkin, and Gilberto Zorio, amongst others.

=== Permanent Collection ===
The Permanent Collection documents crucial moments in the development of contemporary art in Italy and abroad, from the mid-1960s to the present. It sits at the heart of the Museum activities and includes large permanent installations produced specially for the rooms of the historic royal residence. It comprises some of the most significant Arte Povera works by artists such as Giovanni Anselmo, Alighiero Boetti, Mario Merz, Marisa Merz, Michelangelo Pistoletto; seminal pieces by contemporary Italian artists such as Maurizio Cattelan; as well as important works from the Transavanguardia, Land Art, and artworks reflecting the latest contemporary international expressions.

In 2021, the Arte Povera sculptor Giuseppe Penone donated more than 200 works on paper to the Castle of Rivoli – including autographed work notes, handwritten reflections, design sketches, architectural renderings and photographs linked to major pieces – as well as a version of Svolgere la propria pelle – finestra ("To Unravel One's Skin – Window", 1970-2019) originally presented at the Fridericianum in Kassel in 1972.

=== Cerruti Collection ===
In 2017, the Castle of Rivoli announced the acquisition of the Cerruti art collection, estimated to be valued at $570 million. Among the works collected by Federico Cerruti are paintings by Francis Bacon, Giorgio de Chirico, René Magritte, Amedeo Modigliani, Pablo Picasso, Pierre-Auguste Renoir, Wassily Kandinsky, and Andy Warhol.

Furthermore, Villa Cerruti plays an important role within the complex of the Castle of Rivoli thanks also to its "green" element. As far as the castle itself is concerned, only a small part of the ancient existing garden is still present, namely the nymphaeum. This is an artificial cave constructed at the end of the 16th century on the hillside, lined with bricks, supplied by an underground water cistern and covered with spontaneous vegetation. Through an accurate restoration, this site is nowadays open to visitors who are entertained by water games and music. In addition to this small green area, Villa Cerruti intervenes with its peculiar and rather significant garden. In fact, it presents a place for monastic meditation, an agricultural area with a henhouse and a vegetable garden, a play area with a bowling alley, a panoramic view on the Alps and the wood. The most intimate place of the entire property can be found in the wood and it consists of a dog cemetery, in which Cerruti used to bury his pets. The nymphaeum together with the garden of Villa Cerruti provide the Castle of Rivoli with a green lung. This means that the nymphaeum and the garden act as a green space or area that contributes to the overall environment of the Castle of Rivoli.

=== Library ===
The Castle of Rivoli's library has been open to the public since 1999 and specialises in 20th and 21st-century art and theory, with a focus on artists featured in the museum's collections. It includes about 44,000 books and periodicals divided into the following categories: contemporary art, photography, architecture, design and advertising from 1960 to the present day. It also houses an accessible video library with over 900 videos. Since 2009, the Castle of Rivoli Library has been part of the Cobis Coordinamento delle Biblioteche Speciali e Specialistiche di Torino, a local network of specialist libraries.

=== Directors and Board ===
Chairmen

- Giovanni Ferrero (1984–1987)
- Antonio Maria Marocco (1987–1988)
- Marco Rivetti (1988–1994)
- Clara Palmas (1994–1999)
- Cesare Annibaldi (1999–2009)
- Giovanni Minoli (2009–2015)
- Daniela Formento (2015–2017)
- Alberto Tazzetti (2017–2019)
- Fiorenzo Alfieri (2019–2020)
- Francesca Lavazza (2021–present)

Directors

- Rudi Fuchs and Johannes Gachnang (1984–1991)
- Ida Giannelli (1991–2008)
- Carolyn Christov-Bakargiev (2009)
- Andrea Bellini and Beatrice Merz (2010–2014)
- Carolyn Christov-Bakargiev (2015–2024)
- Francesco Manacorda (from 2024)

Current board of directors

- Gianluca Ferrero (Vice-President and Member)
- Maria Sabrina Fichera (Member)
- Marco Chiriotti (Board Secretary)
- Alessandro Cian (Board Secretary)
- Elvira Pozzo (Board of Auditors)
- Laura Schiavone (Board of Auditors)
- Luigi Scalise (Board of Auditors substitute)

Current Advisory Committee

- Lara Favaretto
- Peter Galison
- Joan Jonas
- William Kentridge
- Chus Martinez
- Giuseppe Penone

== Popular culture ==
The palace is the setting for the play King Victor and King Charles by Robert Browning.
