= Center for Curatorial Studies, Bard College =

Exhibition and research center

Coordinates: 42°1′12.6″N 73°54′51.0″W

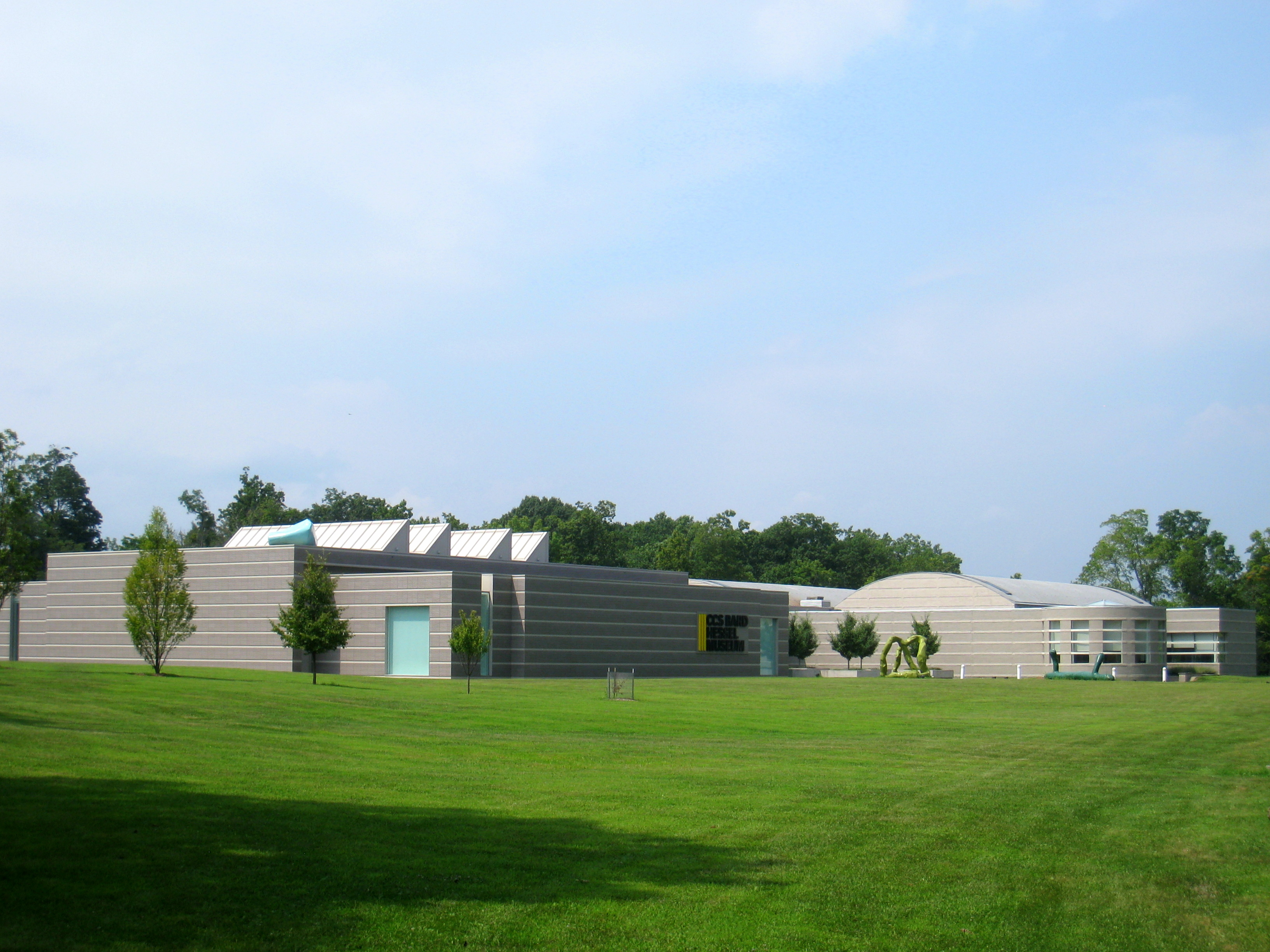
Bard College in Annandale-on-Hudson, New York

Founded in 1990, the Center for Curatorial Studies, Bard College (CCS Bard) is an exhibition and research center dedicated to the study of art and exhibition practices from the 1960s to the present. The Center initiated its graduate program in 1994 and is one of the oldest institutions in curatorial pedagogy, offering a two-year graduate-degree program in curating. Hundreds of curators, writers, critics, artists, and scholars taught seminars and lectured in practicums. The Center alumni/ae include more than 200 individuals working in contemporary art field in the U.S. and internationally.

== History ==
The CCS graduate program is one of eight graduate programs at Bard College in Annandale-on-Hudson, New York. Since its inception in 1994, the graduate program has awarded M.A. degrees to more than 300 students.

The Center's original 38,000-square-foot (3,500 m^{2}) facility, designed by architect Jim Goettsch and design consultant Nada Andric, was completed in December 1991. Expanded in 2006, the Center now features the Hessel Museum of Art, a 17,000-square-foot (1,600 m^{2}) exhibition space dedicated to the Marieluise Hessel Collection of over 1,700 works of contemporary art. The building also includes a library, classrooms, and a student lounge where CCS graduate students can meet informally about exhibitions and class projects.

== Library and Archives ==
Serving as the director of the Library and Archives, Ann Butler has been instrumental in building the Library & Archives at the CCS Bard. The Library consists of over 30,000 volumes focusing on post-1960s contemporary art and curatorial practices. The collection contains international exhibition catalogues, artists' monographs, and international art journals and periodicals. The Special Collections feature historic artist-produced periodicals, a collection of limited edition, signed, and out of print exhibition catalogues, a media collection, and a collection of artists' books. The Archives comprise the institutional archives of CCS Bard and the Hessel Museum of Art, the archives of select galleries, artist-run spaces, the personal papers of select curators and artists, as well as a collection of artist files for artists represented in the Hessel Museum Collection.

== Directors ==
The current executive director Tom Eccles joined CCS Bard in 2005, built the Hessel Museum of Art, and organized the inaugural exhibition of the Marieluise Hessel Collection, entitled Wrestle (2006). In an interview with Althea Viafora-Kress, Eccles states, "We have two central issues that we deal with: one is that we're at Bard. We're not in the center of the city, so people have to have a reason to come here. And the second is that we're a school. So we try things that might not be able to be done in other places."

Vasif Kortun was the first director of the Museum of the Center for Curatorial Studies (1994–97). Directors of the Graduate Program have included Associate Professor of Philosophy and Art History Norton Batkin (1991–2008), curators Maria Lind (2008–2010), Johanna Burton (2010–2012), Paul O'Neill (2013–2017), and Lauren Cornell (2017–ongoing).

Cornell is the first person to be both director of the graduate program and also the chief curator of the Hessel Museum of Art. Her position includes curriculum and faculty development, directing research initiatives, and overseeing artist- and curator-in-residence programs. In 2016, Cornell co-curated Invisible Adversaries with Tom Eccles in 2016. This exhibition was the 10th anniversary exhibition of the Hessel Collection.

== Notable alumni ==
Some notable alumni of the Center are:

- Cecilia Alemani
- Cecilia Brunson
- Dan Byers
- Pip Day
- Anne Ellegood
- Candice Hopkins
- C. Davida Ingram
- Ruba Katrib
- Inés Katzenstein
- Chus Martínez
- Laura Mott
- Gabi Ngcobo
- Victoria Noorthoorn
- Carina Plath
- Tomáš Pospiszyl
- Ben Portis
- Laurel Ptak
- Yasmil Raymond
