= Joanna Piotrowska =

Polish photographer (born 1985)

- Born: 1985; Warsaw, Poland
- Known for: Photography
- Website: joannapiotrowska.com

Joanna Piotrowska (born 1985) is a Polish artist based in London. She examines the human condition through performative acts and the construction of multiple ‘social landscapes’ using photography, performance and film. Family archives, self-defence manuals and psychotherapeutic methods are used as reference points as Piotrowska explores the complex roles which play out in everyday performance. Her psychologically charged photographs probe human behaviour and the dynamics of familial relations, exploring intimacy, violence, control, and self-protection. The artist reveals moments of care as well as hierarchies of power, anxieties, and imposed conventions that play out in the domestic sphere.

Her work has been exhibited at Le BAL, Paris (2023), Tate Britain (2019), Kunsthalle Basel (2019) and MoMA, New York (2018). She was also included in the 59th Venice Biennale (2022), The 16th Lyon Biennale (2022) and the 10th Berlin Biennale (2018).

== Education ==
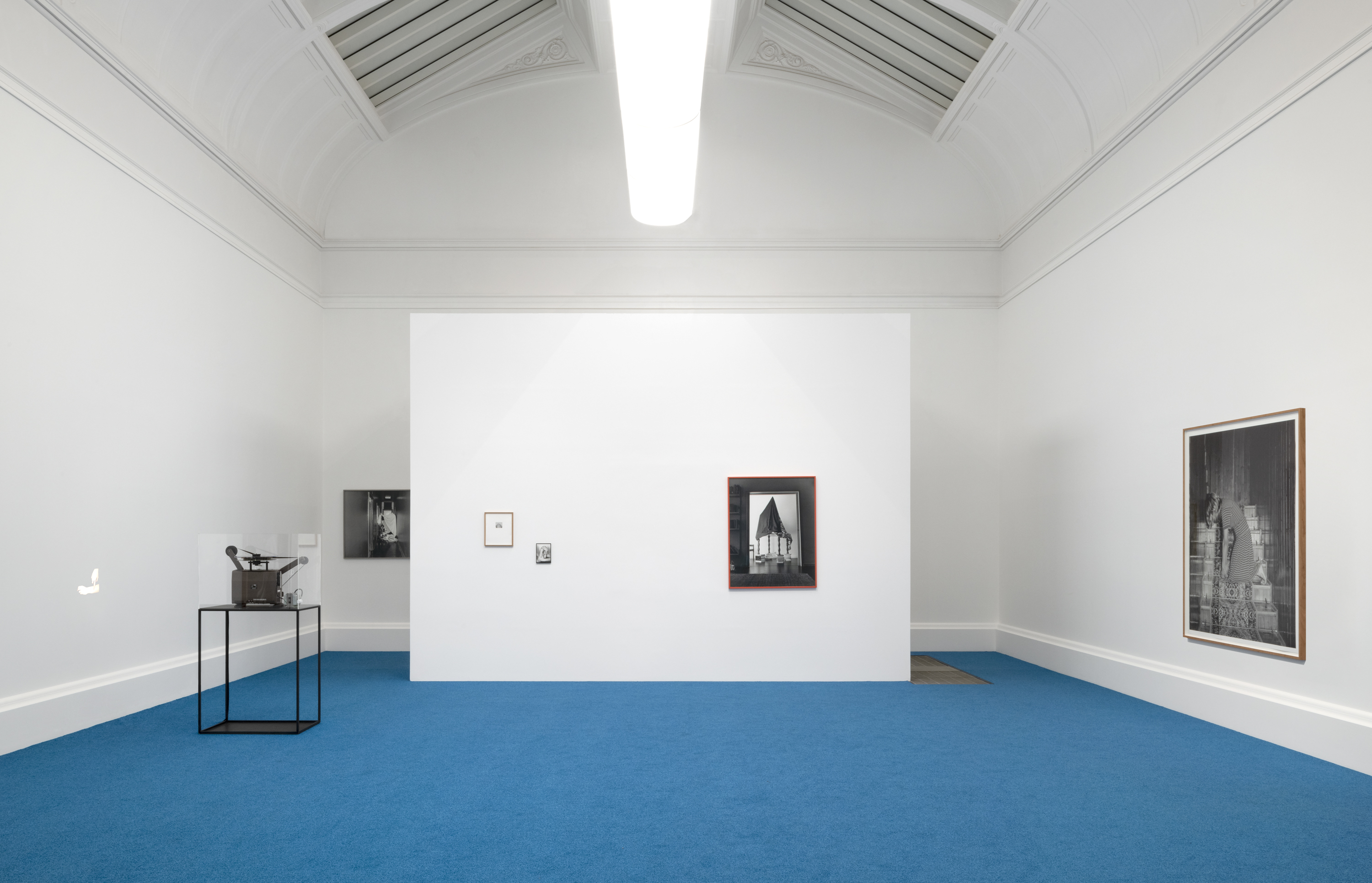
Installation view, Art Now. Joanna Piotrowska: All Our False Devices (2019)

Piotrowska earned an MFA from the Royal College of Art, London, in 2013.

== Career ==
Piotrowska's 2014 series "FROWST" is a series of staged family portraits. The photos were published in a book by the same name, which won the First Book Award in 2014.

After winning one of the three Jerwood/Photoworks Awards in 2015, Piotrowska focused on photographing teenage girls in self-defense poses. She shot the series in Poland, finding subjects through friends and casting agencies that worked with aspiring actresses.

In 2016, she began her "Frantic" series, in which she asked adults to construct homemade forts from their personal belongings. She traveled to Lisbon and Rio de Janeiro, photographing her subjects in their homes.

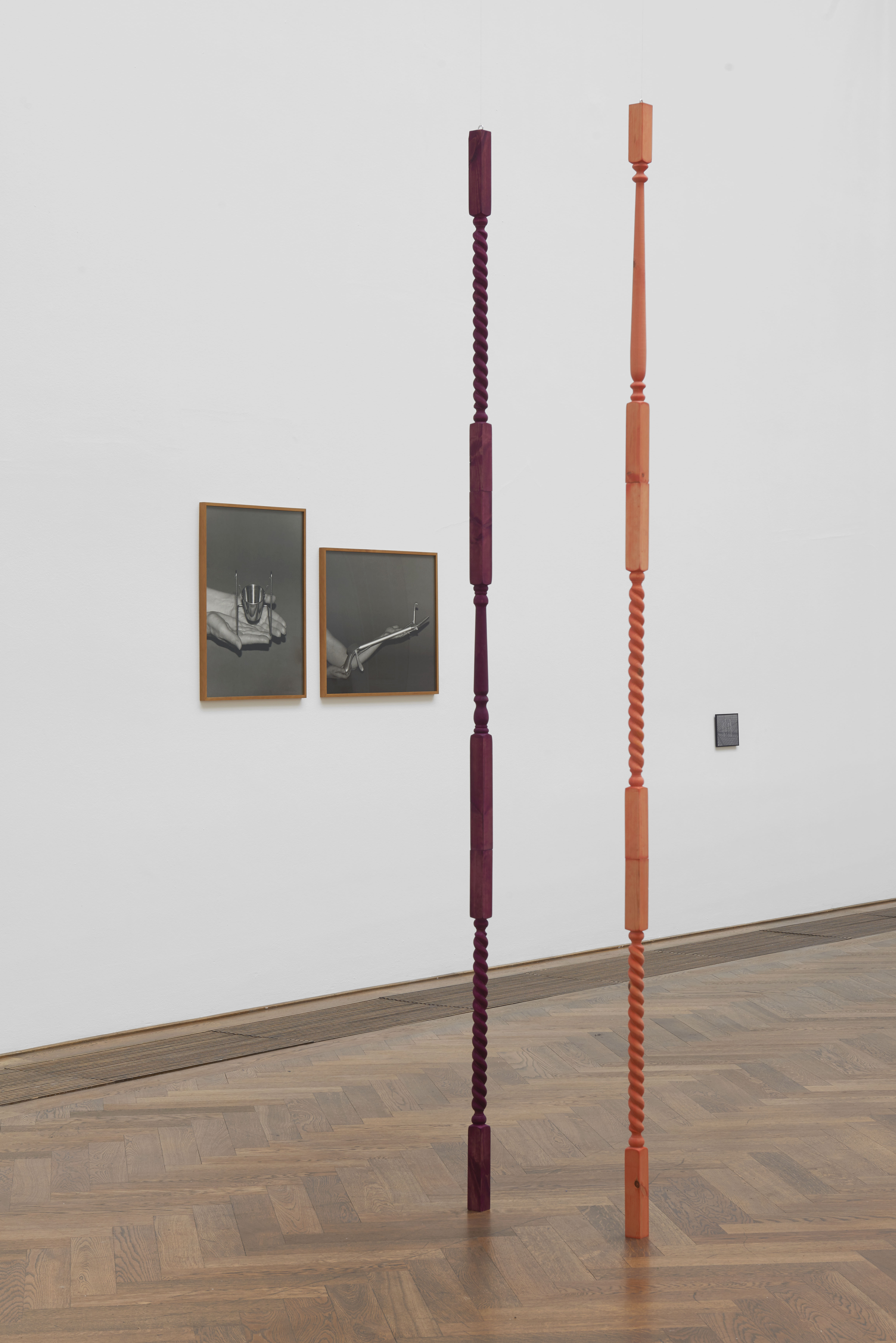
Installation View, Joanna Piotrowska: Stable Vices, Kunsthalle Basel (2019).

== Exhibitions ==
- Being: New Photography 2018, Museum of Modern Art, New York City, 2018. Curated by Lucy Gallun.
- 10th Berlin Biennale for Contemporary Art, KW Institute for Contemporary Art, Berlin, 2018. Curated by Gabi Ngcobo.
- Art Now: Joanna Piotrowska – All Our False Devices, Tate Britain, London, 2019. Curated by Sofia Karamani and Zuzana Flaskov.
- Joanna Piotrowska: Stable Vices, Kunsthalle Basel, Basel, Switzerland, 2019/20. Curated by Elena Filipovic.
- Joanna Piotrowska: FROWST, Zachęta National Gallery of Art, Warsaw, Poland, 2020. Curated by Magdalena Komornicka.
- Our Red Sky, Göteborgs Konsthall, Göteborg, Sweden. 2020/21.
- Joanna Piotrowska: Sleeping Throat, Bitter Thirst, Kestner Gesellschaft, Hannover, Germany, 2022. Curated by Adam Budak and Robert Knoke
- 16th Lyon Biennale of Contemporary Art: Manifesto of Fragility, Lyon, France, 2022.
- 59th Venice Biennale of Art: The Milk of Dreams, Venice, Italy, 2022. Curated by Ceclia Alemani.
- Joanna Piotrowska: Entre Nous, Le BaL, Paris, France, 2023. Curated by Diane Dufour and Julie Héraut.

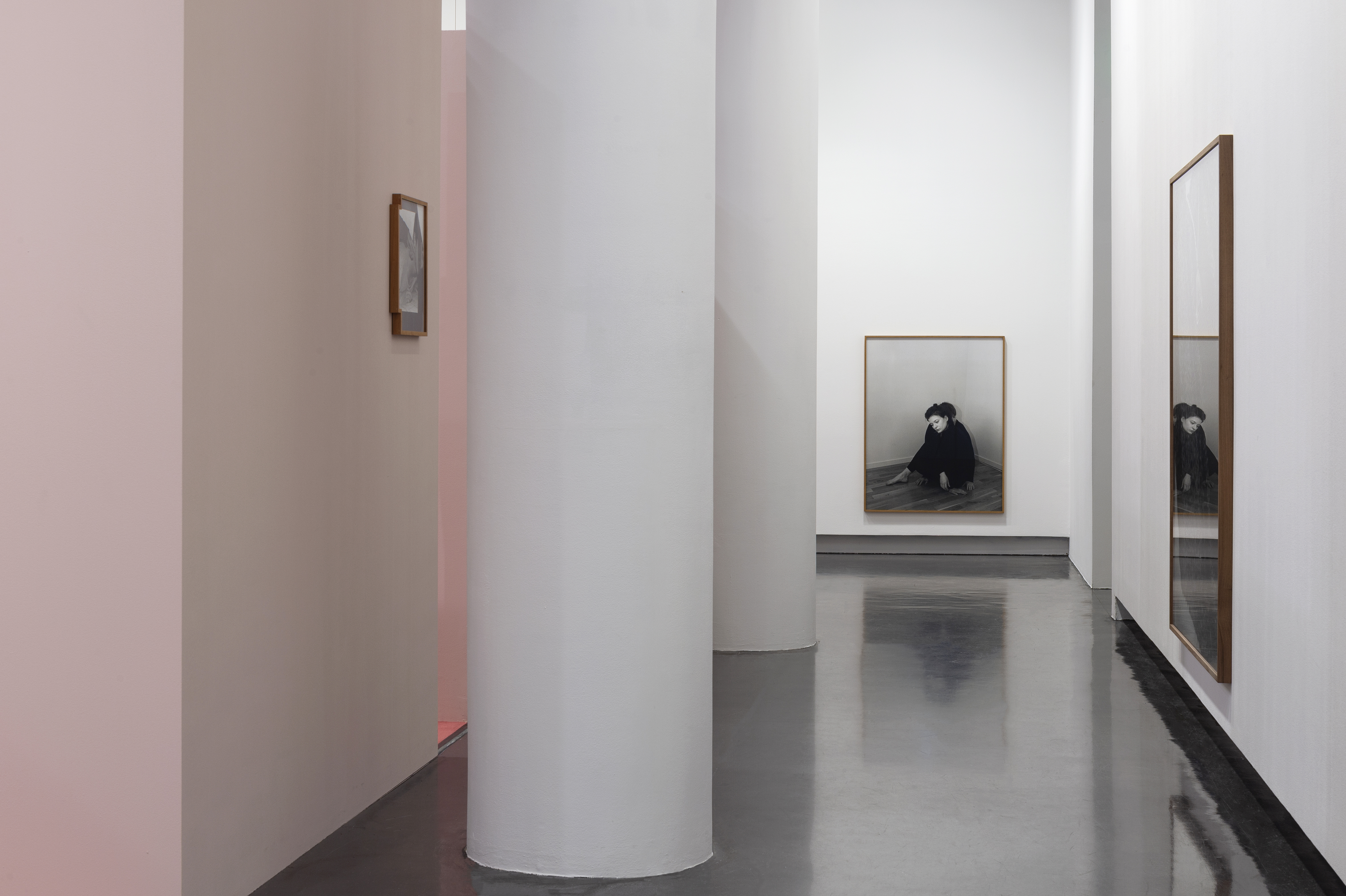
Installation Views, Joanna Piotrowska: Entre Nous, Le Bal, Paris (2023)

== Publications ==
- Joanna Piotrowska: FROWST, London: Mack, 2014, 48 p., ISBN 978-1-910164-10-5
- Joanna Piotrowska: Frantic, with texts by Sara De Chiara, Anouchka Grose, Pier Paolo Tamburelli. Milan: Humboldt Books, 2017. 108p. ISBN 9788899385354
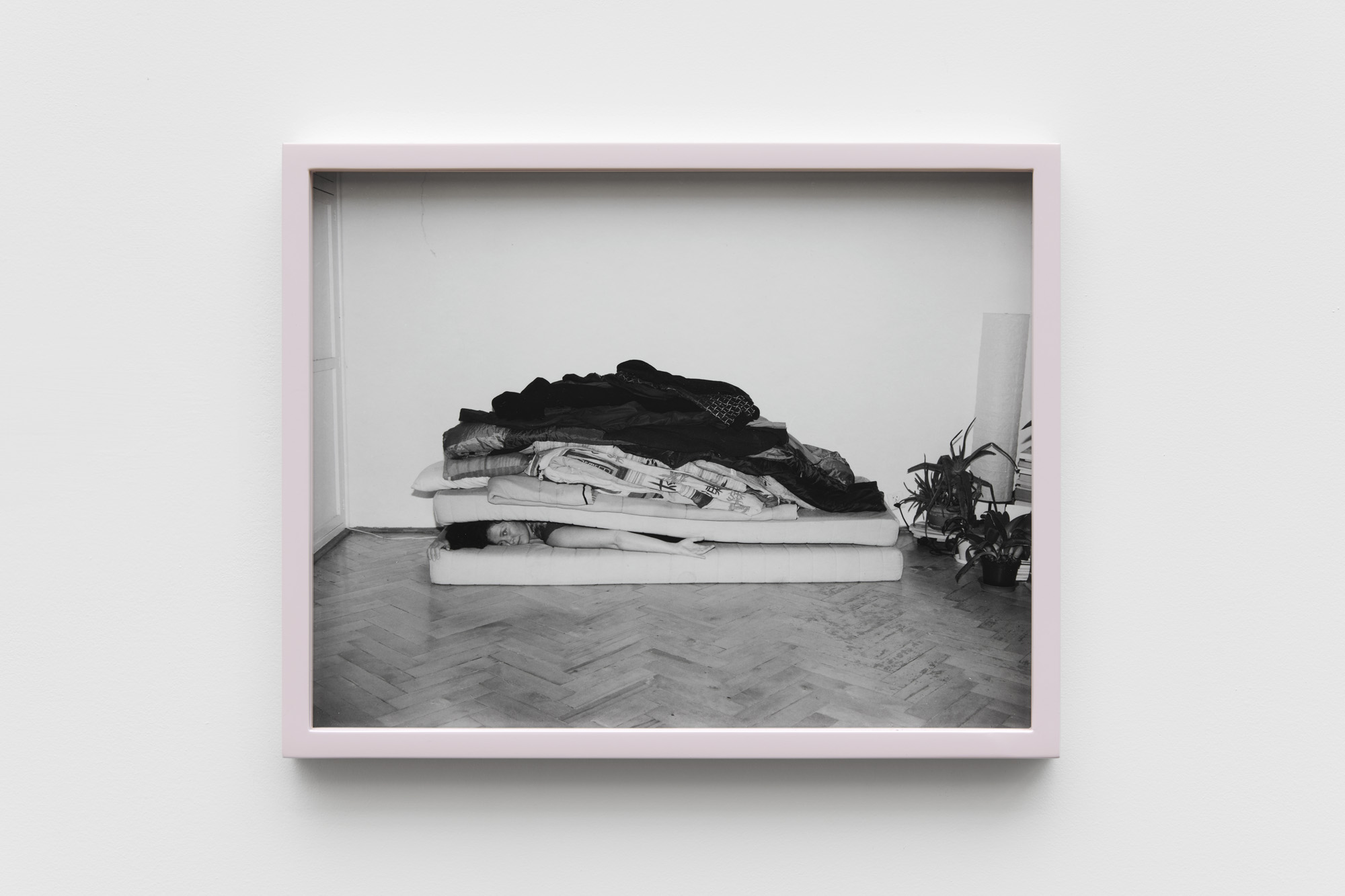
- Joanna Piotrowska, Untitled, 2017. Silver gelatine hand print, 21 x 27cm.
  Joanna Piotrowska: Stable Vices, with essays from Sara De Chiara, Joanna Bednarek and Dorota Masłowska, London: Mack, 2021, 176 p., ISBN 978-1-912339-39-6

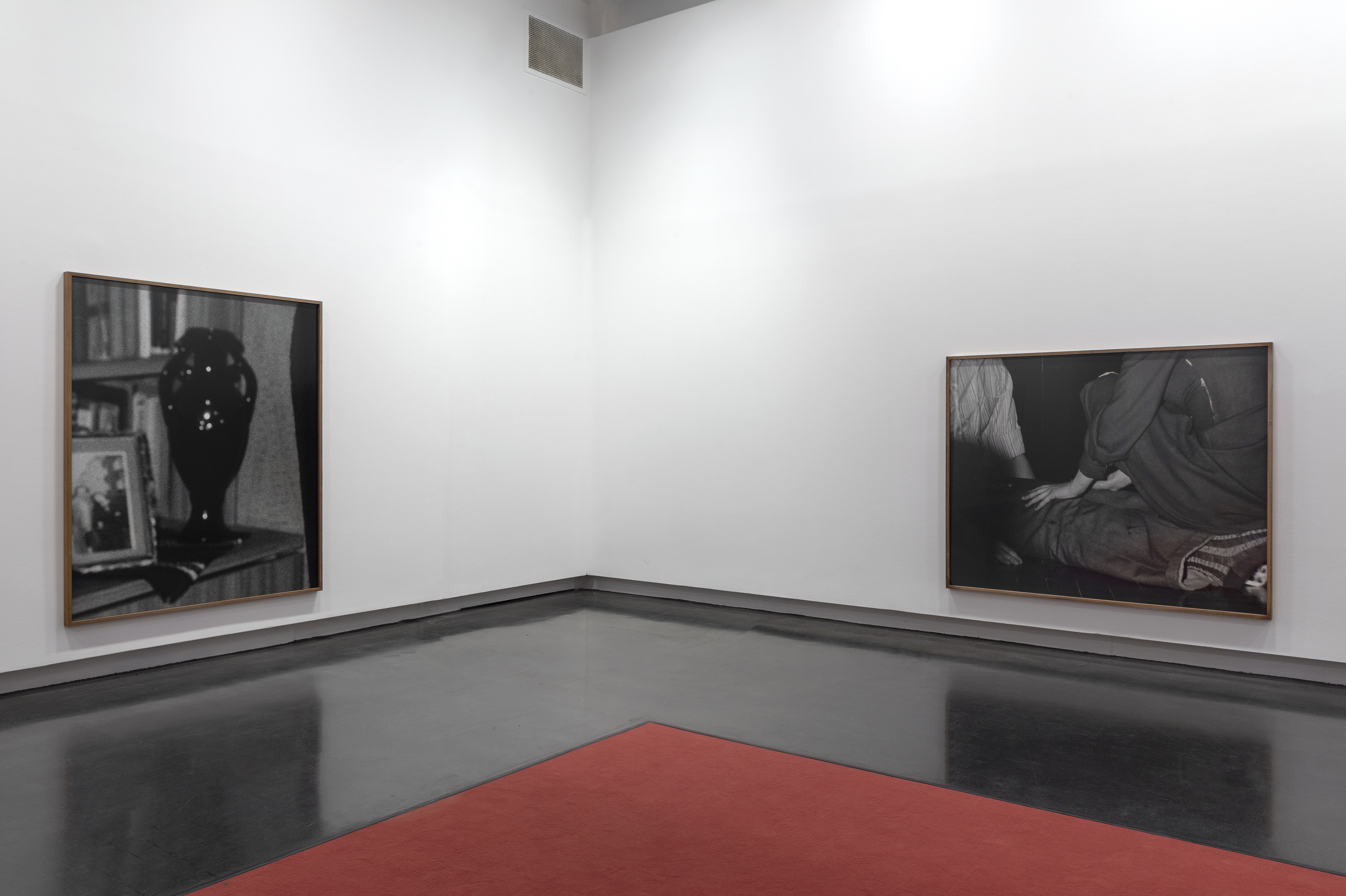
Installation Views, Joanna Piotrowska: Entre Nous, Le Bal, Paris (2023)
