= Berlin Biennale =

Art exhibition

The Berlin Biennale (full name: Berlin Biennale für zeitgenössische Kunst, Berlin Biennale for Contemporary Art) is a contemporary art exhibition, which has been held at various locations in Berlin, Germany, every two to three years since 1998. The curator or curators choose the artists who will participate. After the event became established, annual themes were introduced. The Biennale is now underwritten by the German government through the Kulturstiftung des Bundes (Federal Culture Foundation) and is the second most important contemporary arts event in the country, after documenta. The Berlin Biennale was co-founded on 26 March 1996 by Klaus Biesenbach and a group of collectors as well as patrons of art. Biesenbach is also the founding director of KW Institute for Contemporary Art and currently serves as Director of MoMA PS1 and Chief Curator at Large at MoMA.

== Chronology ==
=== 1st Berlin Biennale ===
The first exhibition ran from 30 September to 30 December 1998 and was curated by Klaus Biesenbach, Hans-Ulrich Obrist and Nancy Spector. It took place in the Kunst-Werke Institute for Contemporary Art in Berlin-Mitte, at the Akademie der Künste in Pariser Platz and at the Postfuhramt (a former government post office) in Oranienburger Straße. More than 70 artists took part, including several unknowns who would later become famous, such as Franz Ackermann, Jonathan Meese, Thomas Demand and Olafur Eliasson. The show was interdisciplinary to reflect the context of contemporary art. During the opening week, the Thai artist Rirkrit Tiravanija catered a banquet for 1,000 guests in the post office gymnasium, and a three-night combination symposium and festival, Congress 3000, took place in the House of World Cultures.

=== 2nd Berlin Biennale ===
The Second Berlin Biennale ran from 20 April to 20 June 2001 and included works by approximately 50 artists (deliberately fewer than at the first) from more than 30 countries, several of them very young. It was curated by Saskia Bos, who adopted the theme of "connectedness, contribution and commitment" and sought to reject commercially oriented art while fostering engagement with the public in order to "exhibit a utopian sociability in art". Works were again exhibited at the Kunst-Werke Institute for Contemporary Art and the postal centre in Oranienburger Straße as well as under the elevated S-Bahn at Jannowitzbrücke and the Allianz Building, known as the Treptowers.

Since 2004, the Kunst-Werke Institute for Contemporary Art, which was founded by Klaus Biesenbach in the early 1990s, has been responsible for the Berlin Biennale.

=== 3rd Berlin Biennale ===
The Third Berlin Biennale took place from 14 February to 18 April 2004 and was directed by Ute Meta Bauer, who chose five themes, or "hubs," titled Migration, Urban Conditions, Sonic Landscapes, Modes and Scenes, and Other Cinema, in order to focus on artistic conversation and on the specific circumstances of post-Cold War Berlin. The Kunst-Werke Institute for Contemporary Art was again used as a site; additional sites included the Martin Gropius Bau and, for the exhibition of 35 cinematic works, the cinema Kino Arsenal at Potsdamer Platz. There were several collaborations with various Berlin cultural institutions, a partnership with the Friends of the Deutsche Kinemathek, and a weekly special radio broadcast, reboot.fm. The event ended with a three-day multi-media Performance Jam on the final weekend. The Artforum reviewer pointed to the lack of new work and the extra year's delay since the second Berlin Biennale as signs of a need for better funding and referred to some of the collaborations as "strained aesthetic ententes." A 2008 retrospective in Berliner Zeitung judged Bauer as having been "unable to decide between aesthetic statement and didacticism."

=== 4th Berlin Biennale ===
The Fourth Berlin Biennale ran from 25 March to 5 June 2006, curated by Maurizio Cattelan, Massimiliano Gioni, and Ali Subotnick, known collectively as the Wrong Gallery after a project they did in New York. Titled Von Mäusen und Menschen (Of Mice and Men) and conceived of as an extended narrative or life cycle, the Fourth Berlin Biennale featured works by Mircea Cantor, Bruce Nauman, Ján Mančuška, and Thomas Schütte, among others. The 2006 Berlin Biennale was recognized as a "project of peak cultural importance" and received both federal funding and other assistance. In The New York Times, Roberta Smith called it "a kind of rebus about the arc and tumult of life." The Berliner Zeitung retrospective contrasted John Steinbeck's theme in his novel of that name, the American dream, with the exhibition's, "the trauma of the 20th century." The organizers opened a special gallery, the Gagosian Gallery, and presented some works there six months in advance. In Berlin itself, the Biennale used 11 or 12 venues, including the Old Garrison Cemetery and the Hall of Mirrors in the Ballhaus Mitte, most of them along Auguststraße. This Biennale was "a giant success" and drew 85,000 visitors. However, one critic judged it to have sacrificed the human to economic considerations and preferred the opposition of the Third Biennale.

=== 5th Berlin Biennale ===
The Fifth Berlin Biennale was curated by Adam Szymczyk and Elena Filipovic and took place from 5 April to 15 June 2008. It was titled When Things Cast No Shadow. By day, 50 artists representing four generations showed works, many of them site-specific, at four locations including the Neue Nationalgalerie and the Schinkel pavilion behind the Kronprinzenpalais. A parallel night-time segment titled Mes nuits sonts plus belles que vos jours (My nights are more beautiful than your days; the title of a 1989 "erotic thriller" by Andrzej Żuławski) involved more than 100 artists in 63 presentations all over the city of more extemporaneous and less finished works. This Biennale drew on the history of the city, but was also seen by one critic as the "coming of age" of an exhibition which up to then had featured "trendy trash art" and been more of a tourist-oriented evocation of the city than it had been at the end of the 1990s.

=== 6th Berlin Biennale ===
The Sixth Berlin Biennale ran from 11 June to 8 August 2010 and was headed by Kathrin Rhomberg. It was preceded by Project Artists Beyond, sponsored by the European Commission, which sought to showcase the process of artistic creation through exhibits in public places. This began in January and involved seven artists in Amsterdam, Istanbul, Pristina, Copenhagen, Vienna, and Paris in addition to Berlin. This Biennale was named was draußen wartet (what is waiting out there) and the guiding question was "Glauben Sie an die Wirklichkeit?" (Do you believe in reality?). More than 40 artists were featured. Rhomberg chose sites in parts of the city inhabited by large numbers of migrants and invited the New York art critic Michael Fried to mount an exhibition on the drawings of the 19th-century artist Adolph Menzel in association with the Alte Nationalgalerie and the Museum of Prints and Drawings. During the first week of the exhibition, La monnaie vivante / The Living Currency / Die lebende Münze was presented by the Hebbel am Ufer theatre and the Centre d’art contemporain de Brétigny, with choreography by Pierre Bal-Blanc. According to Der Spiegel, this Biennale was forgettable and the attendance figures were not even published.

=== 7th Berlin Biennale ===
The Seventh Berlin Biennale took place from 27 April to 1 July 2012 and was curated by Artur Żmijewski with art historian Joanna Warsza and the Voina art collective. The emphasis was on political relevance: 320 trees from the environs of the Auschwitz concentration camp were transplanted to various Berlin locations; the organizers created a newspaper in advance of the opening, P/Act for Art: Berlin Biennale Zeitung, in which they published invited opinions from cultural figures on the state of cultural policy in Berlin; members of the Occupy movement were invited to occupy the Kunst-Werke Institute; and one weekend there was a forum in the round organized by Jonas Staal for representatives of organizations on terrorist watch lists. One exhibit, the Peace Wall by Nada Prlja of Macedonia, was a black barrier 12 metres (39 ft) wide by 5 metres (16 ft) high blocking Friedrichstraße at the point roughly 200 metres (220 yd) south of Checkpoint Charlie, where tourist attractions and expensive shops give way to a largely immigrant and poor neighborhood of Kreuzberg. It was taken down early after public protest. This Biennale broke the attendance record but was not well received by critics, with some saying that there was not enough art and that there was more relevance in the works on show at commercial venues in Berlin Gallery Weekend, which fell on the Biennale's opening weekend.

=== 8th Berlin Biennale ===
The Eighth Berlin Biennale took place from 29 May to 3 August 2014 and was curated by Juan A. Gaitán. Locations were the Haus am Waldsee, the Dahlem museums of the Berlin State Museums, the Kunst-Werke Institute for Contemporary Art, and Crash Pad c/o Kunstwerke.

=== 9th Berlin Biennale ===
The Ninth Berlin Biennale took place from to 4 June to 18 September 2016 and was curated by the New York art collective DIS. The theme was The Present in Drag and the locations were the Academy of Arts, the European School of Management and Technology, the Kunst-Werke Institute for Contemporary Art, the Feuerle Collection, and a sightseeing boat. Some reviewers criticized it as "slick" and "shallow".

The 9th Berlin Biennale stirred some controversy among critics and audiences. James Farago, of The Guardian, wrote a scathing review, describing the art event as "an ultra-slick, ultra-sarcastic biennial, replete with ads, avatars, custom security guard uniforms, a manic social media presence disposed to hashtags like #BiennaleGlam, and a woman lip syncing to Trap Queen".

Other critics lauded the Biennale; in the September 2016 Issue of Artforum, British artist Hannah Black wrote that “…They [DIS] have been greeted, just like the modernist avant-gardes were in their time, with accusations of bad politics and even worse taste. Perhaps these critics haven’t noticed: The world is a ruin, but we go on living in it…”

Piero Bisello concluded that "Regardless of what we thought Berlin Biennale 2016 would be, we can now claim it is for us a milestone in art history, whether by that history we mean the last centuries, the last years, the last days, the last hours, the last fashion seasons".

Tess Edmonson wrote For Art Agenda that "As a whole, the biennial articulates the sense that disengaging from networks of capital and power is neither effective nor interesting nor possible, instead performing its own complicity".

One year later art historian Susanne von Falkenhausen commented on the controversial nature of the 9th Biennale: "Finding myself confronted with such a unified front of fantasies, rhetorics, pretensions and desires for authenticity in 2017, I confess that I revised my reaction to DIS’s 2016 Berlin Biennale 9, 'The Present in Drag'. That exhibition rigorously, to the point of cynicism, followed the web 2.0 world of digital prosumer reality and the moral ambiguity of its promises and aesthetics. In my view, it catered to a young, white, middle-class audience, but now it strikes me as more realistic than what we are seeing today: an outsourcing to the (post-)colonial other of the political, guilt, spiritual desire and collectivity that plague the Western-Northern self."

=== 10th Berlin Biennale ===
The 10th Berlin Biennale for Contemporary Art took place from 9 June to 9 September 2018, and was curated by Gabi Ngcobo and her team of Nomaduma Rosa Masilela, Serubiri Moses, Thiago de Paula Souza and Yvette Mutumba. Titled We don’t need another hero, the 10th Berlin Biennale for Contemporary Art is a conversation with artists and contributors who think and act beyond art as they confront the incessant anxieties perpetuated by a willful disregard for complex subjectivities.

From 9 June to 9 September 2018, it presented works by:

Agnieszka Brzeżańska, Ana Mendieta, Basir Mahmood, Belkis Ayón, Cinthia Marcelle, Dineo Seshee Bopape, Elsa M’bala, Emma Wolukau-Wanambwa, Fabiana Faleiros, Firelei Báez, Gabisile Nkosi, Grada Kilomba, Heba Y. Amin, Herman Mbamba, Joanna Piotrowska, Johanna Unzueta, Julia Phillips, Keleketla! Library, Las Nietas de Nonó, Liz Johnson Artur, Lorena Gutiérrez Camejo, Lubaina Himid, Luke Willis Thompson, Lydia Hamann & Kaj Osteroth, Lynette Yiadom-Boakye, Mario Pfeifer, Mildred Thompson, Mimi Cherono Ng'ok, Minia Biabiany, Moshekwa Langa, Natasha A. Kelly, Okwui Okpokwasili, Oscar Murillo, Özlem Altın, Patricia Belli, Portia Zvavahera, Sam Samiee, Sara Haq, Simone Leigh, Sinethemba Twalo and Jabu Arnell, Sondra Perry, Tessa Mars, Thierry Oussou, Tony Cokes, Tony Cruz Pabón and Zuleikha Chaudhari.

=== 11th Berlin Biennale ===
The 11th Berlin Biennale is curated by María Berríos, Renata Cervetto, Lisette Lagnado, and Agustín Pérez Rubio.

=== 12th Berlin Biennale ===
The 12th Berlin Biennale took place from June 11 to September 18, 2022 and was curated by the artist-curator Kader Attia. With approximately 100 artists included across various venues and exhibitions, the 12th Berlin Biennale centred around ideas of repair. Here, Attia looks back at over two decades of engagement with decolonial theory and practice to determine ways to care for the now.
