= Dalila Puzzovio =

Argentine artist (born 1943)

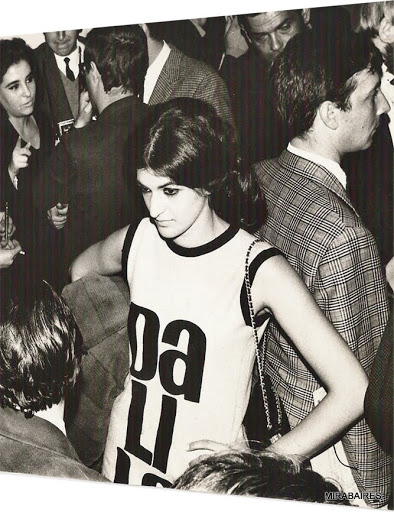
- Dalila Puzzovio (ca. 1965)
- Born: 1943 (age 82–83); Buenos Aires, Argentina
- Occupations: Visual artist Fashion designer
- Years active: 1961– present

Dalila Puzzovio (born 1 January 1943) is an Argentine visual artist and fashion designer active during the 1960s. Puzzovio works in the art forms of pop, happening, and conceptual art. Her artistic creativity is credited by Graciela Melgarejo as having paved the way for subsequent Argentine artists and greatly influenced the work they produced.

"The day we went to the Di Tella award ceremony, I got out of the taxi wearing platform shoes, a satin miniskirt, and a monkey-fur jacket, and two policemen didn't know whether to grab me or what; they looked at me with such fear that they let me pass by, they just weren't up for it."

—

== Biography ==
With the encouragement of her parents, Puzzovio's career was able to develop at the early age of 12. Although there is no documentation of formal education, her artistic vocation developed under the mentorship of two artists: surrealist Juan Batlle Planas and conceptual artist Jaime Davidovich. She studied under their wing up until 1961, when she exhibited her paintings for the first time in Galeria Lirolay in her hometown of Buenos Aires. Two years later, she showcased her second exhibition, Cascaras, which she developed and French artist Germaine Derbecq curated. In 1964, she was in a selected group of around 30 artists to participate in the New Art of Argentina, or "New Art of Argentina", held by the Walker Art Center in Minneapolis in conjunction with the Instituto Torcuato Di Tella in Buenos Aires.

Like many pop artists of the time, such as Delia Cancela and Eduardo Costa, Puzzovio blended her interest in art with fashion. Her work in this category led to the creation of Dalila Doble Plataforma (Dalila Double Platform). Until 1985, she focused on developing herself as a fashion designer by making costumes for film and theater and working directly in the fashion industry.

Since the 1980s, Puzzovio has experimented with an array of artistic categories. During the 1980s and 1990s, her artistic advice was used to create several interior and architectural designs. Until the beginning of the 1990s, she also contributed to popular magazines such as Vogue, where she completed tasks as a writer, editor, and illustrator. From 1998 to present day, her artwork primarily consists of digital photographic collages, among the most notable is her work Hibridos (Hybrids).

She currently works and resides in Buenos Aires, Argentina.

== Artworks ==
=== Collaborative works ===
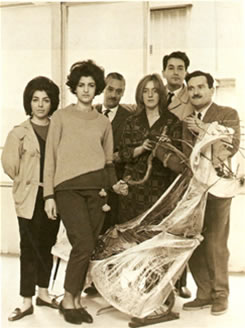
Dalila Puzzovio in 1962 with her piece La Novia Abandonada

In 1963, she worked alongside Germaine Derbecq to create her second exhibition Cascaras (Shells). These "cascaras astrales", or astral shells, resembled empty bodies and were made of discarded orthopedic casts and other objects. According to the artist, these sculptures held the vibrations of the body it once held. Continuing with the use of casts as her primary medium, Puzzovio created Coronas para los habitantes no humanos from 1964 to 1998. This work, as described by Eduardo Squirru is illustrative of mortality and death; the color white representing the frailty of the human bone and the black representing the soul's darkness.

In the 1960s, there was a surge of pop artists in Argentina, among them Puzzovio, Edgardo Gimenez, and Puzzovios' husband Carlos "Charlie" Squirru, whom she had met in 1962. During 1965, this artistic trio worked together on the design for a poster panel located on the corner of Viamonte and Florida Streets in Buenos Aires that read "¿Por qué son tan geniales?". The panel was constructed by painters from Meca publicity agency and posed the question "Why are we such geniuses" in bold, black letters. Under the question was the name of the three artists as well as a large portrait of the three artists holding items that defined their artwork: Puzzovio held empty orthopedic casts, Gimenez held industrial materials, and Squirru held a blood transfusion bag. The billboard was meant to resemble a movie advertisement and was overlooked by Argentine passersby and commuters. Inés Katzenstein wrote that it was in this self-deprecating manner that the artists publicly acknowledged the commentary of their judges and spread awareness on their names and artwork to the general public.

=== Individual projects ===
From 1966 to 1967, Puzzovio created Autoretrato, which was a form of self portraiture that was made by artisan film painters on a 223 x 365.5 x 100 canvas. The painting illustrated the tanned body of an international model Verushka, who laid on the sand with a bikini embedded with rich jewels. The face of the model, however, was replaced with that of Dalila Puzzovio, who happened to resemble the model. According to Maria Jose Herrera, rather than revealing an accurate representation of Puzzovio's physical appearance, this ideal self portrait illustrates an identity that the artist relates to; in this case, the artist identifies with the sexual body of a woman that complies with fashion standards. It was this painting that granted Puzzovio her first Premio Nacional Di Tella, an artistic award given in Argentina.

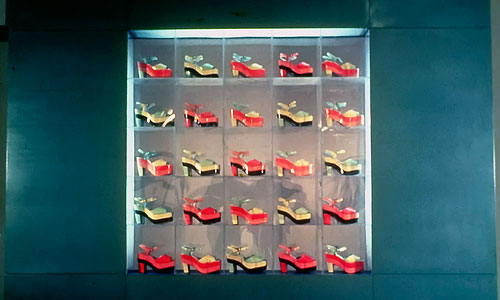
Dalila Puzzovio. Doble Plataforma, 1967.

By 1967, Puzzovio had created Dalila doble Plataforma; in this fusion of art and fashion, she created a total of 40 women's platform shoes. Puzzovio aimed to analyze how women became empowered through wearable accessories that added vibrancy and height to their physique; she predicted that women would not only feel empowered but would be able to transcend from the 1960s all the way to the 2000s. The platform shoes were evenly spread out in a glass display made up of distinct cubicles, each containing a lonesome pair. At first, their exhibition was exclusive to art galleries, such as the Centro de Arte Visuales del Instituto Di Tella, but they were eventually put on display behind the shopping windows of traditional shoe stores such as Grimoldi. Puzzovio reduplicated this object and offered it to these shoe stores for commercial use, ultimately producing a massive artwork that extended from the Di Tella to the commercial streets of Argentina. The following year, her artwork was honored through the Premio Nacional de Di Tella, which would make her a second-time winner of such award. She additionally used this artwork as the basis of El Deslumbre, an installation and performance that was showcased at arteBA, Buenos Aires' annual contemporary art fair, in 2011. This exhibition recreated the environment and atmosphere of shoe stores that originally carried her "arty-shoes". The general public that visited contributed to the mobilization of the artwork by trying on pairs of shoes and modeling them in a catwalk that was installed specifically for the event.

== Collections ==
Her work is currently conserved by both private and public collectors, among those are the Centro de Arte Visuales del Instituto Di Tella in Buenos Aires and the Museo de Arte Moderna de Buenos Aires.

== Costumes for film and theater ==
- 1966 - Wardrobe for the concert "Help Valentino", with Antonio Gasalla and Carlos Perciavalle
- 1968 - Costumes for Mrs. Libertad Leblanc for the film "Psexoanalisis" directed by Héctor Olivera
- 1969 - Costumes for Mrs. Malvina Pastorino, "Pepsi", Comic Theater, Buenos Aires
- 1971 - Costumes and set design for Miguel A.'s musical comedy Rondano "La Vera Historia de Salomé", General San Martín Theater, Buenos Aires
- 1975 - Costume for the musical comedy performed by Tato Bores "Hello Tato", Teatro Estrellas, Buenos Aires
- 1977-78 - Costumes for the television show "Con sabor a Pinky", Buenos Aires
- 1981 - Costumes for the María Creuza show, Hotel Bauen, Buenos Aires
