= Connie Butler =

American curator

Cornelia H. Butler
- Born: February 1, 1963 (age 63)
- Other name: Connie Butler
- Education: Scripps College
- Occupations: museum curator, author, art historian
- Awards: Women's Caucus for Art Lifetime Achievement Award (2007)

Cornelia H. Butler (born 1 February 1963) is an American museum curator, author, and art historian. Since 2023, Butler is the Director of MoMA PS1. From 2013 to 2023, she was the Chief Curator at the Hammer Museum in Los Angeles.

== Early life and education ==
A California native, Butler is a 1980 graduate of Marlborough School, and a 1984 graduate of Scripps College.

== Career ==
From 2006 to 2013, Butler served as the Robert Lehman Foundation Chief Curator of Drawings at the Museum of Modern Art in New York City. Prior to that, she was a curator at the Museum of Contemporary Art, Los Angeles (MOCA), from 1996 to 2006. Butler also held curatorial positions at the Neuberger Museum of Art in Purchase, New York; Artists Space in New York City; and the Des Moines Arts Center. She was hired as curator of drawings for MoMA in October 2005, when she was still working on developing her WACK! project for MOCA.

Her multimedia exhibition WACK! Art and the Feminist Revolution dealt with international feminist art of the 1970s. The exhibit was shown at The Geffen Contemporary at the Museum of Contemporary Art in Los Angeles in the summer of 2007. When curating WACK!, reviewer Carolyn Stuart noted that Butler included works by 124 women artists, and several male collaborators, and also included several works of art "with little or no obvious feminist content", or works not described as feminist by their creators. She co-published a book about the exhibition in 2007. She was interviewed for the film !Women Art Revolution.

She co-authored the book From Conceptualism to Feminism: Lucy Lippard's Numbers Shows 1969–74, which was published in 2013. In July 2013, she began overseeing the entirety of Hammer Museum's curatorial department, including "developing and organizing exhibitions, building the Hammer Contemporary Collection, and overseeing the Hammer's artist residency program and artist council." In May 2014 at MoMA, she co-curated the first major Lygia Clark retrospective to be held in the US. Working for the Hammer Museum in Los Angeles as chief curator, in April 2016 she secured a donation of street photography by Daido Moriyama, the world's largest collection. In 2019, she curated an exhibit on Lari Pittman. In 2020, she was developing an exhibition on feminism called Witch Hunt. The release was pushed back to February 2021.

== Other activities ==
- Mike Kelley Foundation, Member of the Board

== Recognition ==
- 2020: Audrey Irmas Award for Curatorial Excellence, presented by CCS Bard (The Center for Curatorial Studies at Bard College)

== Exhibitions ==
- 2015: with Jamillah James, Mark Bradford: Scorched Earth, Hammer Museum, Los Angeles, California
- 2014: with Michael Ned Holte, Made in L.A. 2014, Hammer Museum, Los Angeles, California
- 2014: with Luis Pérez-Oramas, Lygia Clark: The Abandonment of Art, 1948-1988, Museum of Modern Art (MoMA), New York City, New York
- 2012 to 2013: Alina Szapocznikow: Sculpture Undone, 1955–1972, Museum of Modern Art (MoMA), New York City, New York
- 2010 to 2011: with Catherine de Zegher, On Line: Drawing Through the Twentieth Century, Museum of Modern Art (MoMA), New York City, New York
- 2010: with Klaus Biesenbach and Neville Wakefield, Greater New York, MoMA P.S. 1, Long Island, New York
- 2009: Paul Sietsema, Museum of Modern Art (MoMA), New York City, New York
- 2007: WACK! Art and the Feminist Revolution, Geffen Contemporary at the Museum of Contemporary Art, Los Angeles, California

== Publications ==
=== Books and exhibition catalogues ===
- Bradford, Mark, and Cornelia H. Butler. Scorched Earth: Mark Bradford. Los Angeles: Hammer Museum, 2015.
- Butler, Cornelia H., Michael Ned Holte, and Judy Fiskin. Made in L.A. 2014. Los Angeles: Hammer Museum, 2014.
- Butler, Cornelia H., Luis Pérez Oramas, Antonio Sergio Bessa, and Lygia Clark. Lygia Clark: The Abandonment of Art, 1948-1988. New York: The Museum of Modern Art, 2014.
- Butler, Cornelia H., Pip Day, and Peter Plagens. From Conceptualism to Feminism: Lucy Lippard's Numbers Shows, 1969-74. London: Afterall Books, 2012.
- Butler, Cornelia and Alexandra Schwartz, eds. Modern Women: Women Artists at the Museum of Modern Art. New York: The Museum of Modern Art, 2010.
- Butler, Cornelia H., and M. Catherine de Zegher. On Line: Drawing Through the Twentieth Century. New York: Museum of Modern Art, 2010.
- Butler, Cornelia, Bruce Hainley, Nancy Grubb, and Paul Sietsema. Figure 3: Paul Sietsema. New York, NY: Museum of Modern Art, 2009.
- Butler, Cornelia H., and Lisa Gabrielle Mark. WACK!: Art and the Feminist Revolution. Los Angeles: Museum of Contemporary Art, 2007.
- Rowell, Margit, and Cornelia H. Butler. Cotton Puffs, Q-Tips, Smoke and Mirrors: The Drawings of Ed Ruscha. New York: Whitney Museum of American Art, 2004.
- De Kooning, Willem, Cornelia H. Butler, and Paul Schimmel. Willem De Kooning: Tracing the Figure. Los Angeles: Museum of Contemporary Art, 2002.
- Butler, Cornelia H., Weng Choy Lee, and Francis Pound. Flight Patterns: Laurence Aberhart ... Et Al. Los Angeles: Museum of Contemporary Art, 2000.
- Butler, Cornelia H. Afterimage: Drawing Through Process. Los Angeles: Museum of Contemporary Art, 1999.
- Butler, Cornelia H., and Jessica Bronson. Jessica Bronson. Los Angeles: The Museum of Contemporary Arts, 1998.
- Butler, Cornelia H. The Power of Suggestion: Narrative and Notation in Contemporary Drawing. Los Angeles: Museum of Contemporary Art, 1996.
- Butler, Cornelia H., and Lucinda H. Gedeon. Inspired by Nature. Purchase, N.Y.: Neuberger Museum of Art, 1994.
- Butler, Cornelia H. Iowa Artists 1988. Des Moines, Iowa: The center, 1988.

=== Articles ===
- McCornack, Julia, and Connie Butler. "From Painting to Therapeutic Practice: Conversation about Lygia Clark: The Abandonment of Art, 1948-1988." X-Tra: Contemporary Art Quarterly 17, no. 1 (Fall 2014): 4-21.
- Butler, Connie. "This Is Art--These People Are Artists: Pacific Standard Time, Conceptual Art, and Other Momentous Events from a Local Point of View." Art Journal 71, no. 1 (Spring 2012): 38–57.
- Butler, Connie. "That's Guy de Cointet." Artforum International 45, no. 10 (Summer 2007): 418–421.
- Butler, Connie. "Flight patterns." Art Journal 60, no. 2 (Summer 2001): 9–12.
- Butler, Connie. "West of everything." Parkett no. 57 (January 3, 1999): 189–201.
- Butler, Connie. "Rita McBride." Journal of Contemporary Art 7, (March 1995): 82–89.
- Butler, Connie. "Queer space." Art & Text 49 (September 1994): 83–84.
