= Nada Prlja =

Macedonian artist

- Born: 1971; Sarajevo
- Alma mater: Royal College of Art
- Occupation: Artist
- Employer: Istituto Marangoni London; School of Art
- Family: Branko Prlja
- Website: https://nadaprlja.com/

Nada Prlja (Macedonian: Нада Прља; born 1971) is a Macedonian artist.

Nada Prlja was born in 1971 in Sarajevo, then part of the Socialist Federal Republic of Yugoslavia. Her brother is the writer Branko Prlja. Her mother's family were bourgeoisie who lost their property to nationalization, while her father's family were partisans. Her maternal grandmother was the painter Nada Korda; though she died before Prlja was born, her work was an early artistic influence. After her parents' divorce, she and her mother relocated to Skjope. Nada Prlja attended the National High School of Fine Art and the Academy of Fine Arts in Skopje.

Prlja earned a MPhil from the Royal College of Arts in London and taught at a number of schools in London, including the Istituto Marangoni London and the School of Art, Architecture and Design at London Metropolitan University.

Her Peace Wall was part of the 7th Berlin Biennial in 2012. It was a black barrier 12 metres (39 ft) wide by 5 metres (16 ft) high blocking Friedrichstraße at the point roughly 200 metres (220 yd) south of Checkpoint Charlie, where tourist attractions and expensive shops give way to a largely immigrant and poor neighborhood of Kreuzberg. Intended to highlight poverty and neighborhood displacement, instead it drew criticism and even vandalism from many the Kreuzberg neighborhood who thought it was ugly and disrupted traffic and business. It was disassembled several weeks early.

Her project Department for Conservation and Restoration is a series of plasterboard reinterpretations of the celebrated murals by Borko Lazeski that were destroyed when the Central Hall of the Telecommunication Center in Skopje burned in 2013.

She represented North Macedonia at the 58th Venice Biennale in 2019 with an exhibition called Subversion to Red.
