= Yasmil Raymond =

- Education: School of the Art Institute, Chicago
- Known for: American and European contemporary art
- Awards: Best Monographic Museum Show Nationally, 2008

Yasmil Raymond is an American visual art curator who has been serving as the rector of the Städelschule in Frankfurt since 2020.

== Education ==
Raymond received a Bachelor of Fine Arts from The School of the Art Institute of Chicago and Master of Arts from the Center for Curatorial Studies, Bard College. In 2004, she won the Monique Beudert Curatorial Award given by the Center for Curatorial Studies at Bard College.

== Career ==
From 1999-2002, Raymond worked in the education department of the Museum of Contemporary Art, Chicago. She worked at the Walker Art Center for five years starting in 2004, where she was first hired as a curatorial fellow, and later became an Associate Curator to the Visual Art department.

In 2009, Raymond joined the Dia Art Foundation as curator. While there, she primarily focused on American and European art with a special emphasis in contemporary art. Raymond was briefly a curator-in-residence at the Jerusalem Center for the Visual Arts in 2010, and was hired as an associate curator at the Museum of Modern Art in the department of Painting and Sculpture in 2015.

In 2020, Raymond was appointed the new rector of Städelschule in Frankfurt and the director of Portikus. In 2024, she was part of the selection committee that chose Naomi Beckwith as the artistic director of Documenta Sixteen.

== Exhibitions ==
In September 2017, an exhibition of the Puerto Rican duo Allora & Calzadilla's work curated by Raymond opens at Dia. As an associate curator at the Walker Art Center, in collaboration with Philippe Vergne, Raymond arranged an award winning exhibition of the work of Kara Walker which traveled on to the Hammer Museum in Los Angeles. The exhibition titled Kara Walker: My Complement, My Enemy, My Oppressor, My Love was awarded the 2008 Best Monographic Museum Show Nationally from the International Association of Art Critics. With Doryun Chong, Raymond curated a group exhibition titled Brave New Worlds in 2007.

While associate curator at the Dia Art Foundation, Raymond has exhibited work by Thomas Hirschhorn, Jean-Luc Moulène, Yvonne Rainer, Ian Wilson, Robert Whitman, Koo Jeong A, Franz Erhard Walther, Tomás Saraceno, Tino Sehgal, and Trisha Brown.
