= Chus Martínez =

Spanish curator, art historian, and writer

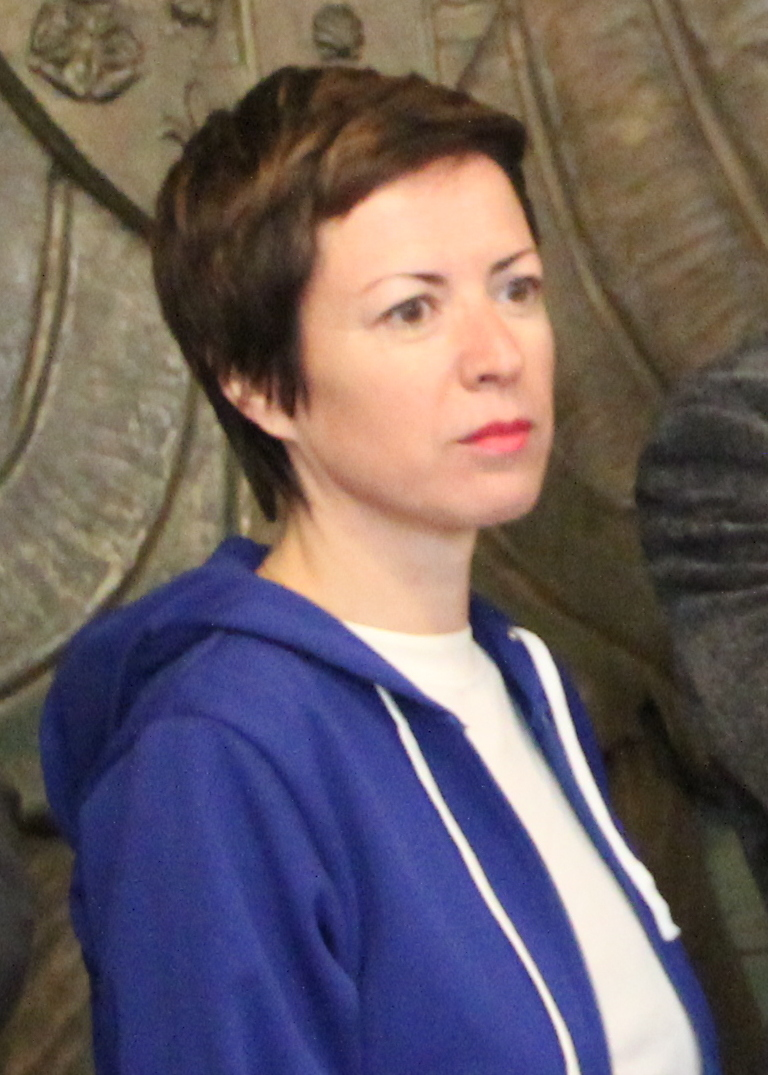
Martínez in 2015

Chus Martínez (born 1972) is a Spanish curator, art historian, and writer. She is currently the director of the Art Institute at the FHNW Academy of Art and Design, Basel, where she also runs the Institute’s exhibition space Der Tank. Additionally, Martínez is the artistic director of Ocean Space, Venice, a space spearheaded by TBA21–Academy that promotes ocean literacy, research, and advocacy through the arts. In 2017, Martínez was curator of KölnSkulptur #9. She sits on the advisory boards of numerous international art institutions, including Castello di Rivoli, Turin; De Appel, Amsterdam; Deutsches Historisches Museum, Berlin; and Museum der Moderne, Salzburg.

== Career ==
Martínez was chief curator at El Museo del Barrio, New York, from 2012–2014. Prior to that she was the head of the department of artistic direction and a member of the core agent group for DOCUMENTA(13), for which she edited, with Bettina Funcke, the series “100 Notes–100 Thoughts.” Formerly, as chief curator at the Barcelona Museum of Contemporary Art (MACBA) (2008–2010), director of the Frankfurter Kunstverein (2005–2008), and artistic director at Sala Rekalde, in Bilbao (2002–2005), Martínez has organized numerous exhibitions and publications with contemporary artists. In 2005, she commissioned the Cyprus Pavilion at the 51st Venice Biennale, with artists Panayiotis Michael and Konstantia Sofokleous, and in 2015, Martínez curated the Catalan proposal to the 56th Venice Biennale, with artist Albert Serra. Martínez has also served as curatorial advisor for the 2015 Istanbul Biennial, the 29th São Paulo Art Biennial in 2010, and for the 2008 Carnegie International.

== Education ==
Martínez studied art history and philosophy at the Autonomous University of Barcelona, continuing her studies at the University of Tübingen and at the Free University of Berlin. In 1995, she worked at the Hamburger Bahnhof, in Berlin. Following this, she attended Columbia University and the Center for Curatorial Studies, at Bard College, New York, where she completed her masters.

== Exhibitions ==
=== Sala Rekalde ===
- 2004: David Lamelas, "Space/Time/Fiction"
- 2005: "The Invisible Insurrection of a Million Minds: Twenty Proposals for Imagining the Future" with Lars Bang Larsen and Carles Guerra
- 2005: Sharon Lockhart, "Pine Flat"

=== Frankfurter Kunstverein ===
- 2006: "Ist das Leben nicht schön? Chapter 1: Esra Ersen"
- 2006: "Ist das Leben nicht schön? Chapter 2: Wilhelm Sasnal"
- 2007: "Pensée Sauvage? On Freedom"
- 2008: "The Great Game to Come"
- 2008: "Ibon Aranberri: Disorder"

=== Reina Sofia ===
- 2008: Deimantas Narkevičius, "The Unanimous Life"

=== MACBA ===
- 2009: Thomas Bayrle, "I've a feeling we're not in Kansas anymore"
- 2009: "The Malady of Writing: A Project on Text and Speculative Imagination"
- 2009: "Ray Johnson: PLEASE ADD TO & RETURN"
- 2010: "Are you ready for TV?"
- 2011: The Otolith Group, "Thoughtform"
- 2011: Natascha Sadr Haghighian, "Before/After"

=== Malba ===
- 2015: "The Metabolic Age"

=== Kunsthaus Hamburg ===
- 2016: "Undisturbed Solitude"

=== Kunsthalle Basel ===
- 2016: "Every Contact Leaves a Trace" (presented concurrently at Kasko Basel)

=== Museo Thyssen-Bornemisza ===
- 2018: "John Akomfrah: Purple"
- 2019: "Amar Kanwar"

=== Der TANK ===
- 2015: "Fabian Marti: G.I.F.T."
- 2016: Julieta Aranda, "The Organ: As the Ground Becomes Exposed"
- 2018: "Eduardo Navarro: Into Ourselves"

== Writing ==
- The Octopus in Love
- The Complex Answer
- I Want to Be Your Lover, Not Just Be Your Friend: Learning to Escape the Politics of Prediction
- The Wild Book of Inventions (forthcoming, Sternberg Press)

== Other activities ==
- Flash Art, Member of the Advisory Board
