= Juan Batlle Planas =

Argentine painter

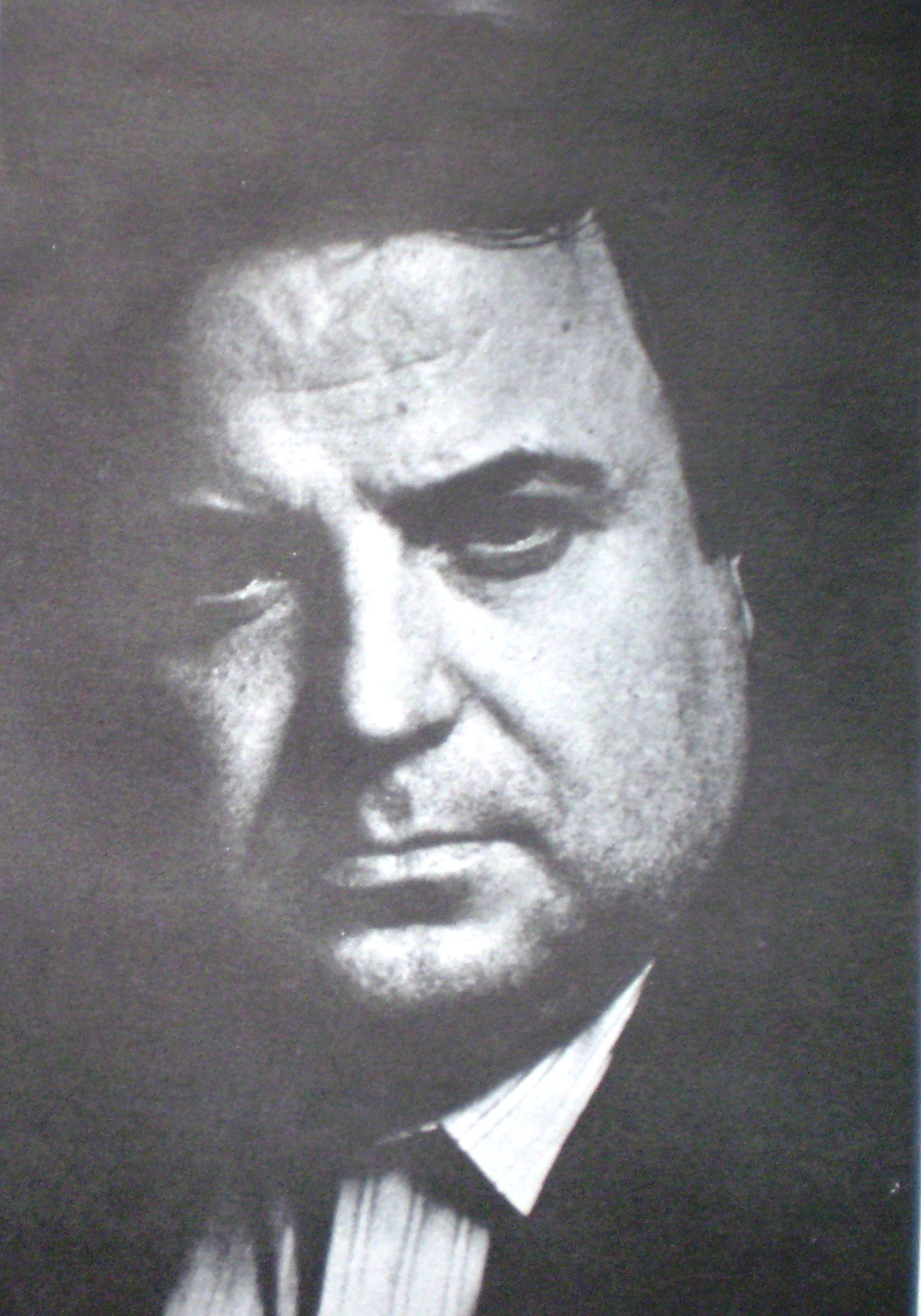
Juan Batlle Planas

Juan Batlle Planas (3 March 1911 in Torroella de Montgrí, Girona, Spain – 8 October 1966 in Buenos Aires, Argentina) was an Argentine painter of Spanish origin belonging to the surrealist school, orienting in later years to romanticism. Many of his works, while obscure, were sombre in feeling, influenced by social unrest and economic and political problems in Argentina. In 1960 he was awarded the Premio Palanza de la Academia Nacional de Bellas Artes de Argentina. Batlle Planas was an influence on numerous Latin American painters, including Roberto Aizenberg. Fashion designer Dalila Puzzovio studied under him.
