= Matilde Herrera =

Argentine journalist, writer, and poet

- Born: 1931; Buenos Aires, Argentina
- Died: 1990 (aged 58–59)
- Occupations: Writer, journalist, poet
- Spouses: Rafael Beláustegui; Roberto Aizenberg
- Children: 3

Matilde Herrera (1931–1990) was an Argentine journalist, writer, and poet. She was a prominent militant against the self-styled National Reorganization Process that took over the country between 1976 and 1983. She was one of the Grandmothers of the Plaza de Mayo, for whom she personally contributed to the recovery of two children who had been illegally adopted.

== Biography ==
Matilde Herrera married Rafael Beláustegui, with whom she had two children. They later divorced, and she remarried, this time to the artist Roberto Aizenberg. She started working as a journalist in 1962, and carried on this work until her death. During the time of state terrorism in Argentina, her three children, José, Valeria, and Martín, and their respective spouses – militants of the People's Revolutionary Army – were kidnapped by the Armed Forces. Valeria and Martín's partner Cristina were pregnant at the time. Herrera did not lose Tania (the first daughter of Valeria and Pepe who was around one year old) and Antonio (the son of José and Electra); these children were left at police stations and hospitals after the abduction of their parents.

In 1977, Herrera went into exile in Paris with her husband, where she founded the Commission of Relatives of the Disappeared, together with Claudia Lareu, Diana Cruces, and other militants. In 1981 they moved to Tarquinia, Italy, and returned to Argentina in 1983, once the military dictatorship ended. Herrera died seven years later, in 1990, of cancer.

== Tributes ==
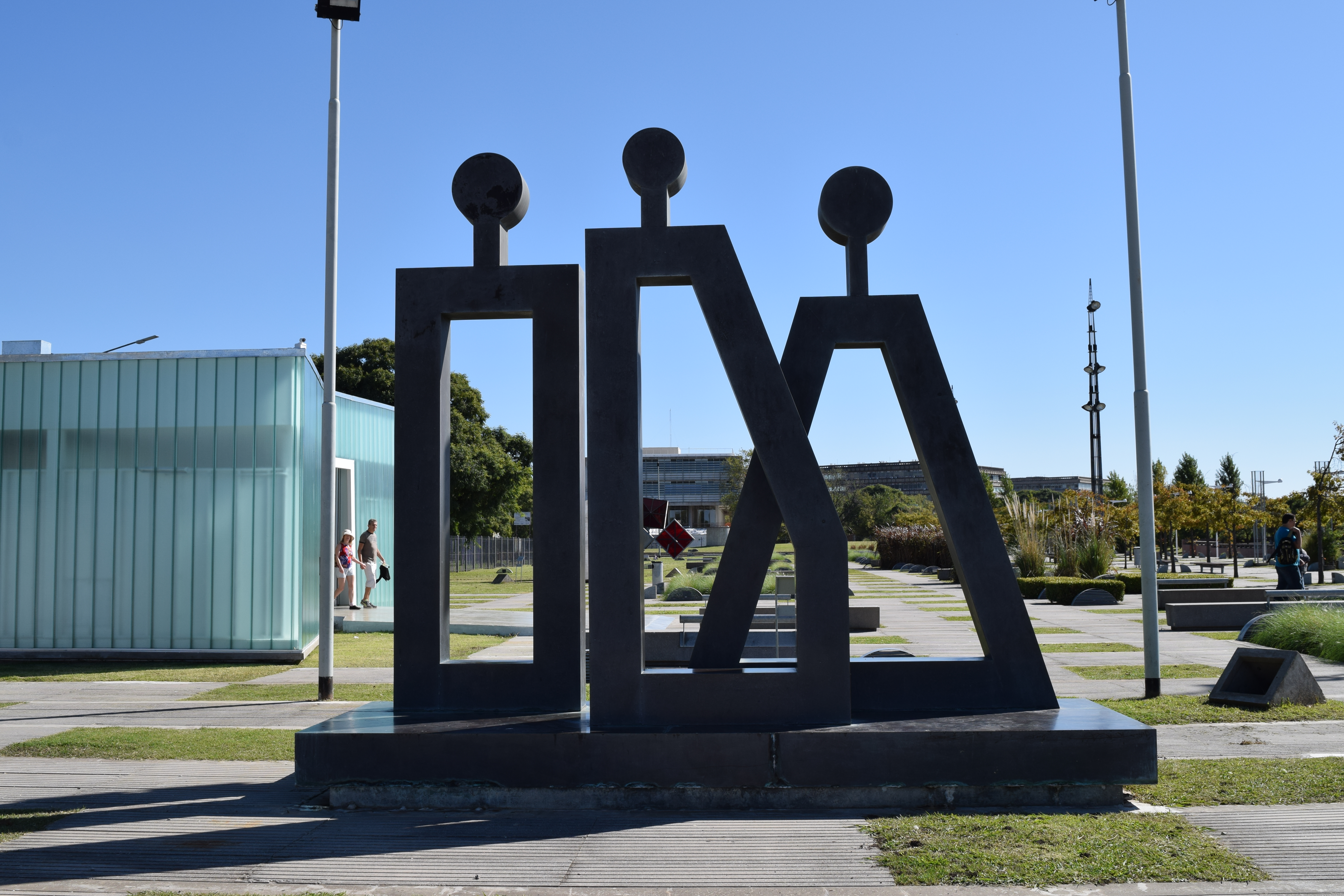
Sin título by Roberto Aizenberg

Herrera was honored in 2002 by the Legislature of the City of Buenos Aires, along with 17 other outstanding Argentine women of the 20th century, including Eva Perón and Alicia Moreau de Justo. The selections were made by the Commission for Women, Children, Adolescents, and Youth.

In an official act carried out on 24 March 2010, the actress Florencia Peña read Herrera's poem "Seremos libres" (We Will Be Free) at the Navy Petty-Officers School of Mechanics, one of the main clandestine detention centers during the military dictatorship.

In the Remembrance Park of Buenos Aires, there stands a statue (Sin título; Untitled) by Roberto Aizenberg in honor of Herrera's three disappeared children: José, Valeria, and Martín. In the sculpture, the contours of three geometric figures without faces are shown, representing all the young people disappeared during the military dictatorship.

== Works ==
- Vos también lloraste. Ed. Libros de tierra firme, Bs. As., 1986, 62 pp. With prologue by Horacio Verbitsky
- José (1987). Reissued Lulu.com, 2009, 447 pp. ISBN 0557041244, 9780557041244
- Identidad, despojo y restitución. Bs. As., 1990. As co-author with Ernesto Tenembaum
