= Gabi Ngcobo =

South African curator, artist and educator

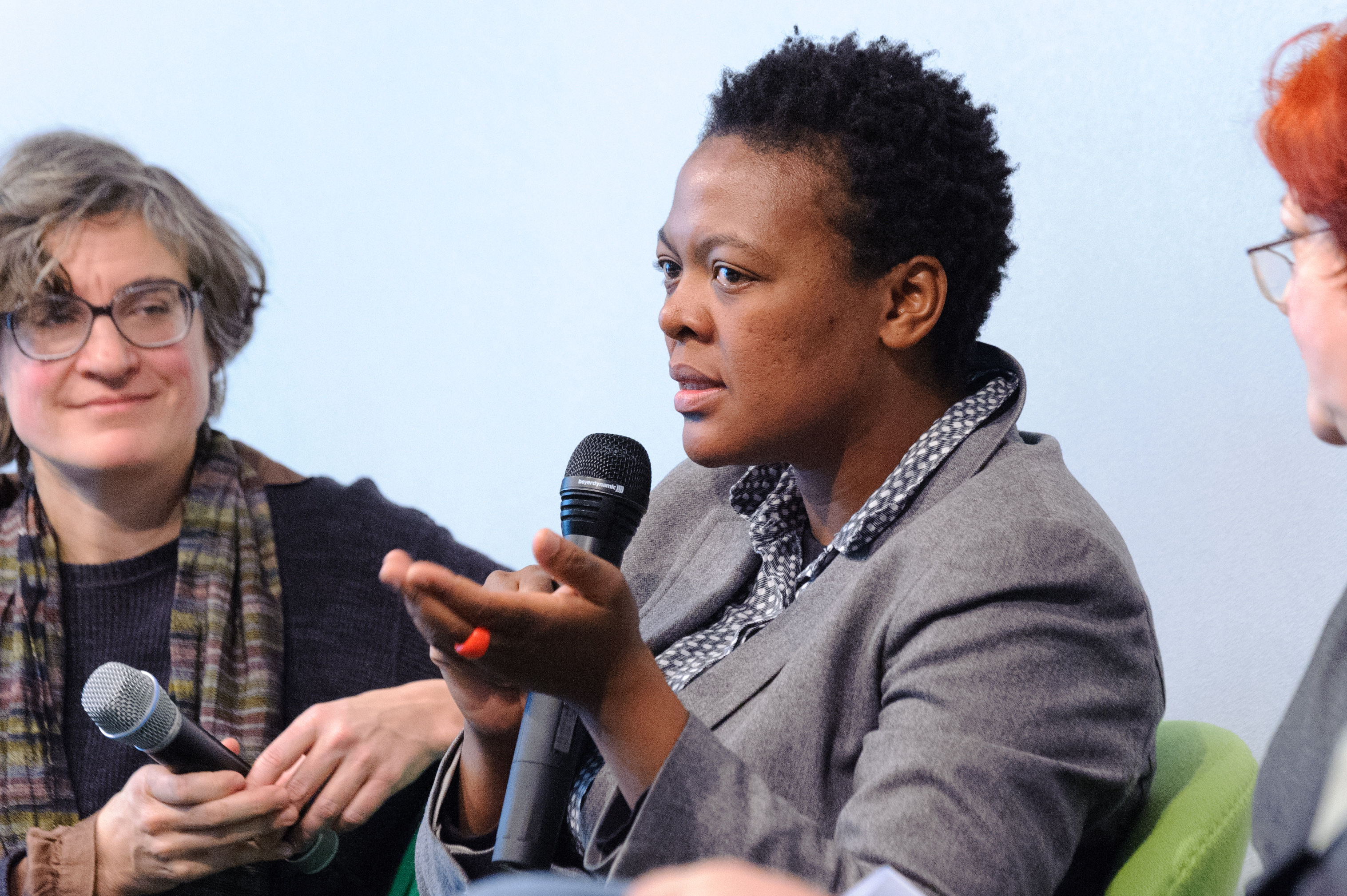
- Ngcobo in 2012
- Born: Umlazi, Durban, South Africa
- Citizenship: South African
- Education: Art History (Bachelor's degree), Curatorial Studies (Master's degree)
- Alma mater: University of Durban-Westville, Bard College

Gabi Ngcobo is a South African curator, artist and educator. Currently she is the Curatorial Director at the Javett Art Centre at the University of Pretoria (Javett-UP).

== Early life and education ==
Gabi Ngcobo was born in Umlazi, a district of Durban belonging to today's province KwaZulu-Natal.

Ngcobo studied Art History at the University of Durban-Westville. After completing her BA degree, she has worked at the Iziko South African National Gallery and the Cape Africa Platform in Cape Town, where she co-curated the Cape 07 Biennale in 2007 together with Jonathan Garnham. In 2010, she completed a Master in Curatorial Studies at the Center for Curatorial Studies at Bard College in New York.

== Career ==
Since the early 2000s, Ngcobo has been involved in collaborative, artistic and educational projects. Together with Dineo Seshee Bopape and Sinethemba Twalo she was the founder of NGO - Nothing Gets Organised. NGO focuses on process and self-organisation that take place outside of predefined structures and contexts. In 2010, she established, along with other artists, curators, and writers, the Center for Historical Reenactments (CHR). The CHR responds and questions how historical legacies impact and resonate within contemporary art. The CHR was team-led with Kemang Wa-Lehulere and Donna Kukama, among others, and was part of the 11th Biennale de Lyon.

Between 2011 and 2020, Ngcobo was a lecturer at the Wits University School of Arts, in Johannesburg. During that time, she was a co-curator of the 32nd São Paulo Biennial in 2016, which was presented at the Ciccillo Matarazzo Pavilion in São Paulo. In 2018, she curated the 10th Berlin Biennale for Contemporary Art in Berlin together with Nomaduma Rosa Masilela, Serubiri Moses, Thiago de Paula Souza and Yvette Mutumba. With Dr. Yvette Mutumba she also co-curated the exhibition A Labour of Love in 2015 as part of her residency at the Weltkulturen Museum in Frankfurt am Main.

In 2018, Ngcobo was part of the selection committee that nominated Ruangrupa as artistic director of Documenta fifteen. Ngcobo was a member of the jury that selected Emilija Škarnulytė as recipient of the Future Generation Art Prize in 2019.

Since 2021, Ngcobo has been the Curatorial Director at the Javett Art Centre at the University of Pretoria (Javett-UP).

== Other activities ==
- Javett Foundation, Member of the Board of Trustees (since 2020)
- Horizn Studios, Member of the Art Program Board (since 2018)
- Zeitz Museum of Contemporary Art Africa, Member of the Curatorial Advisory Group (since 2018)

== Publications ==
- Gabi Ngcobo, Yvette Mutumba (ed.), A LABOUR OF LOVE. exhibition catalogue, Weltkulturen Museum, German and English, Kerber Art Verlag, ISBN 978-3-7356-0140-7.
- Gabi Ngcobo, Don't panic, English, Jacana Media, 2012, ISBN 978-1-9201-9637-0.
