= Philippe Vergne =

Philippe Vergne (born 1966) is a French curator who has been serving as director of the Serralves Contemporary Art Museum since 2019.

From 2014 to 2019, Vergne was director of the Museum of Contemporary Art, Los Angeles (MOCA). He was the director of the Dia Art Foundation, New York from 2008 to 2014 and the deputy director and Chief Curator of the Walker Art Center, Minneapolis, from 2005 to 2008.

== Early life and education ==
Vergne was born in Troyes, France in 1966. He received a BA in law from Panthéon-Assas University, Paris, in 1988, a BA in archeology and the history of modern art from Paris-Sorbonne University, Paris, where he also got a MA in 1991 and a MAS in 1992.

== Career ==
Vergne became director of the newly created Mac (Musée d’Art Contemporain, Marseille) in 1994 until 1997.

Vergne then was hired by the Walker Art Center as a senior curator from 1997 to 2005. Francois Pinault then hired him to head the François Pinault Foundation for Contemporary Art in Paris, but resigned the next year when the foundation decided to open its first space at the Palazzo Grassi in Venice instead. He came back to the Walker in 2005 as a deputy director and was the co-curator with Chrissie Iles of the Whitney Biennial in 2006. In collaboration with Yasmil Raymond at the Walker, Vergne arranged an award winning exhibition of the work of Kara Walker which traveled on to the Hammer Museum in Los Angeles. The exhibition titled Kara Walker: My Complement, My Enemy, My Oppressor, My Love was awarded the 2008 Best Monographic Museum Show Nationally from the International Association of Art Critics. He was also responsible for the Walker’s acquisitions of works by popular living artists, including Doug Aitken, David Hammons, Thomas Hirschhorn, Pierre Huyghe and Luc Tuymans.

From 2008 to 2014, Vergne was the director of the Dia Art Foundation, New York City.

The Museum of Contemporary Art, Los Angeles appointed him director in January 2014. In March 2018, Vergne fired Chief Curator Helen Molesworth. The New York Times reported that Vergne's action "became an embarrassment for the museum. Known for her acclaimed shows of Kerry James Marshall and Anna Maria Maiolino (and for not supporting an upcoming show of Mark Grotjahn, a board favorite), Ms. Molesworth was fired suddenly, for reasons that were never made clear, with the media spreading the news of her departure before a short official museum statement was made. Mr. Vergne never issued a public statement on the decision." In May 2018, it was announced that Vergne's MoCA contract was not renewed, and he departed the role in March 2019. Before his departure, and despite the controversy surrounding it, by February 2019 Vergne had already been hired as director of the Serralves Museum in Porto, Portugal.

== Honours ==
- Chevalier of the Legion of Honour in 2014
- Chevalier of the Ordre des Arts et des Lettres in 2004
