= Dineo Seshee Bopape =

South African multimedia artist

- Born: 1981 (age 44–45); Polokwane, South Africa
- Occupation: Contemporary visual artist
- Years active: 2003 -- present
- Awards: winner of the 2008 MTN New Contemporaries, 2010 Columbia University Toby Fund Awards, the 2017 Sharjah Biennial Prize, and the winner of the Future Generation Art Prize 2017.
- Website: seshee.blogspot.com

Dineo Seshee Bopape is a South African multimedia artist. Using experimental video montages, sound, found objects, photographs and dense sculptural installations, her artwork "engages with powerful socio-political notions of memory, narration and representation." Among other venues, Bopape's work has been shown at the New Museum, the Institute of Contemporary Art, Philadelphia, and the 12th Biennale de Lyon. Solo exhibitions of her work have been mounted at Mart House Gallery, Amsterdam; Kwazulu Natal Society of Arts, Durban; and Palais de Tokyo. Her work in the collection of the Tate.

== Early life and education ==
Bopape was born in Polokwane, South Africa, in 1981. She studied painting and sculpture at the Durban Institute of Technology, and graduated from De Ateliers in Amsterdam in 2007. In 2010 she completed an MFA at Columbia University in New York.

== Notable Installations and Exhibitions ==
In 2011, Bopape had a solo exhibition, the eclipse will not be visible to the naked eye. Her work was also featured in the Geography of Somewhere exhibition at the Stevenson Gallery in Johannesburg, South Africa that same year.

Her piece but that is not the important part of the story, which first premiered at the Lyon Biennial in 2013, was featured in the 2014 exhibition Ruffneck Constructivists at the Institute of Contemporary Art in Philadelphia, which was curated by Bopape's former teacher and mentor Kara Walker. The installation work was made up of wooden beams draped in white fabric, electrical cables, screens, rear-view mirrors, a small fan, and sound recordings. The piece would then be set on fire, on which the artist says "It really started as me wanting to burn the memory of another work, an un-solvable riddle. That’s why it started with the burning, with wanting to make a new work."

In 2017, her piece Lerole: Footnotes (the struggle of memory against forgetting) was installed at the Leopold Museum in Vienna. It was then re-installed at the Witte de With Center for Contemporary Art in Rotterdam, Netherlands in October of that year, and Sfeir-Semler Gallery in Beirut, Lebanon in 2018. The work is composed of clay bricks stacked at various heights around the exhibition space alongside sound recordings of the quetzal bird calls and moving water.

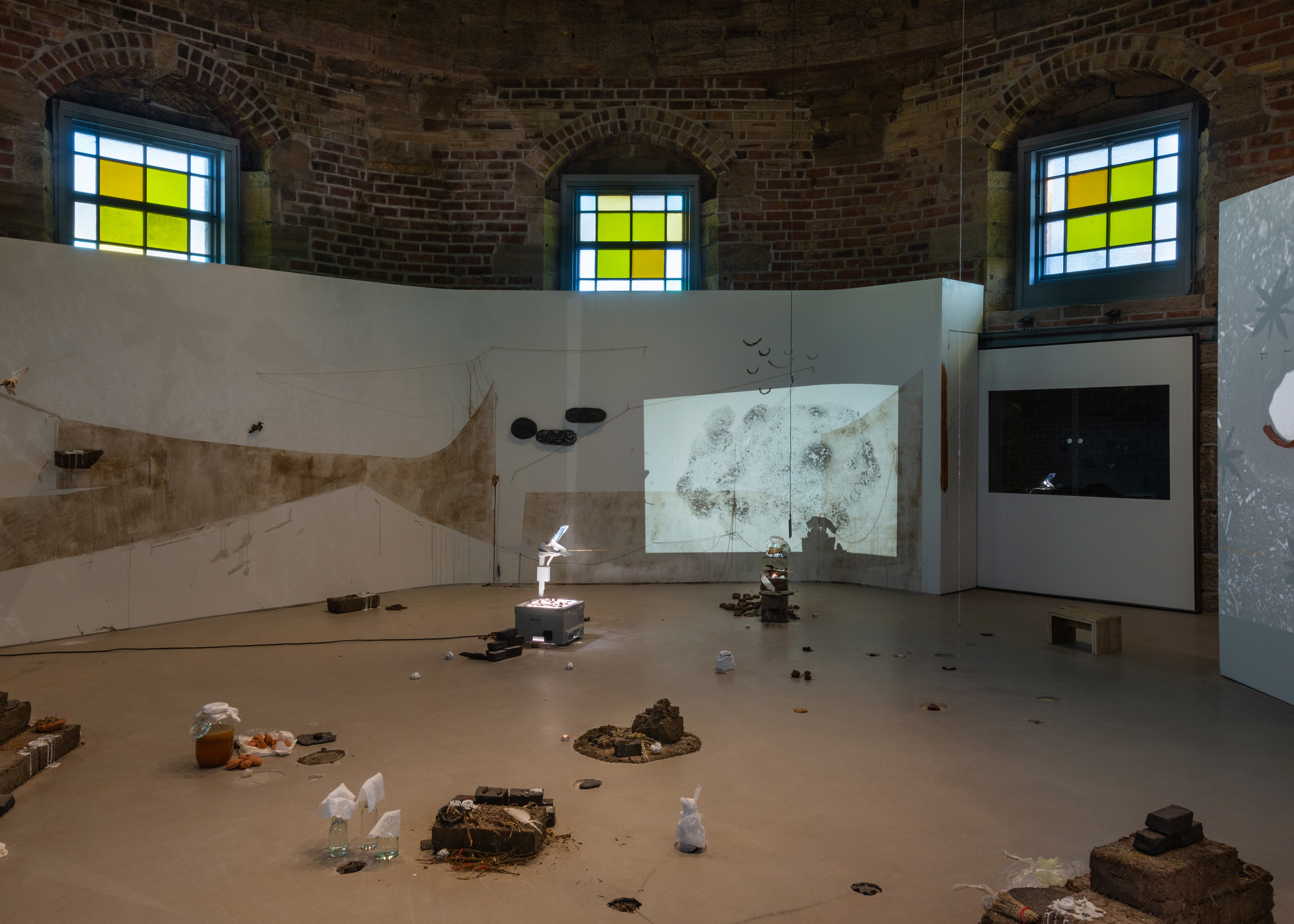
Installation view of When Spirituality Was a Baby at Collective, 2018.

In 2018 she was part of the 10th Berlin Biennale, curated by Gabi Ngcobo and a curatorial team that includes Nomaduma Rosa Masilela, Serubiri Moses, Thiago de Paula Souza and Yvette Mutumba. Her installation, entitled Untitled (Of Occult Instability) [Feelings], 2016–18 was located in the lower level of the KW Institute for Contemporary Art. Set among debris, and made specially for the biennale, the work was bathed in orange light and includes among its videos a film about a white man raping a black woman and clips of legendary artist Nina Simone’s mental breakdown on stage.

When Collective, a new gallery in the City Observatory in Edinburgh, United Kingdom opened in November 2018, Bopape was commissioned to create a new work. Her piece When Spirituality Was a Baby was made of soil and timber.

== Recognition and awards ==
Bopape was the winner of the 2008 MTN New Contemporaries Award, the recipient of a 2010 Columbia University Toby Fund Awards, the 2017 Sharjah Biennial Prize, and the winner of the Future Generation Art Prize 2017.
