= Inés Katzenstein =

Argentine curator, art historian and art critic

- Born: Argentina
- Occupations: Curator; Art historian Art critic
- Years active: 2000-present

Inés Katzenstein is an Argentine curator, art historian, and art critic who specializes in Latin American art.

== Early life and education ==
Katzenstein was born in Argentina.

Katzenstein has a B.A. in communications from the University of Buenos Aires. In 2001, Katzenstein received an M.A. in curatorial studies from the Center for Curatorial Studies at Bard College.

== Career ==
In 2000, Katzenstein got a position at the Museum of Modern Art, where she began as an assistant to the editor-in-chief of Listen, Here, Now! Argentine Art in the 1960s, part of MoMA's International Program Primary Documents publication series, and the first one to focus on Latin American art. She later became an editor of the publication.

From 2004 to 2008, Katzenstein worked as a curator at the Malba-Fundación Costantini, where her focus was on contemporary Argentine art.

In 2007, Katzenstein was the curator of the Argentine Pavilion exhibition at the Venice Biennale, which featured paintings by the artist Guillermo Kuitca.

In 2008, Katzenstein founded the Department of Art at the Universidad Torcuato Di Tella (UTDT).

In 2018, Katzenstein became the director of the newly formed Patricia Phelps de Cisneros Research Institute for the Study of Art from Latin America as well as the Curator of Latin American Art at the Museum of Modern Art.

== Selected exhibitions ==
- 2003: Liliana Porter: Photography and Fiction, Centro Cultural Recoleta (Buenos Aires)
- 2005: David Lamelas, Alien, Foreigner, Ètranger, Aüslander, Museo Rufino (Tamayo, Mexico)
- 2007: Guillermo Kuitca, si yo fuera el invierno mismo, 52nd Venice Biennale (Venice, Italy) – curator of the Argentina Pavilion
- 2007: Zona Franca, projects by Leopoldo Estol and M7red, Mercosur Biennial – co-curator
- 2010: Di Tella, an Episode in the History of TV, Espacio Fundación Telefónica (Buenos Aires) – co-curator
- 2013: Aquella mañana fue como si recuperara si no la felicidad, sí la energía, una energía que se parecía mucho al humor, un humor que se parecía mucho a la memoria, Parque de la Memoria (Buenos Aires)
- 2018: Sur Moderno: Journeys of Abstraction—The Patricia Phelps de Cisneros Gift, Museum of Modern Art (New York) – co-curator

== Selected works and publications ==
- Katzenstein, Inés (1997). Leandro Erlich: Inner City. New York, NY: Consulate General of Argentina. OCLC 951405773.
- Katzenstein, Inés (October 2002). "Fabián Marcaccio. La actualidad de la pintura política". Arte en Colombia (in Spanish). 92. Colombia: 58–62. OCLC 926282635.
- Porter, Liliana; Katzenstein, Inés (edición y selección de textos) (2003). Liliana Porter: Fotografía y ficción (Exhibition catalog) (in Spanish). Buenos Aires, Argentina: Centro Cultural Recoleta y Malba-Colección Costantini. ISBN 978-9-872-10880-9. OCLC 55006947. – 18 de noviembre de 2003 al 29 de febrero de 2004, Centro Cultural Recoleta, Junín 1930, Buenos Aires
- Katzenstein, Inés (2004). "Introduction". In Katzenstein, Inés (ed.). Listen, Here, Now!: Argentine Art of the 1960s: Writings of the Avant-Garde. New York, NY: Museum of Modern Art. pp. 9–13. ISBN 978-0-870-70366-9. OCLC 56447030.
- Katzenstein, Inés (2004). "Section 5: The Object Redefined. Reality Rush: Shifts of Form, 1965-1968". In Zelevansky, Lynn (ed.). Beyond Geometry: Experiments in Form, 1940s-70s (Exhibition catalog). Los Angeles, CA: Los Angeles County Museum of Art. pp. 189–. ISBN 9780262240475. OCLC 222491139. – Published in conjunction with the exhibition organized by and held at the Los Angeles County Museum of Art, Los Angeles, June 13-Oct. 3 2004; Miami Art Museum, Florida, Nov. 18, 2004-May 1, 2005
- Katzenstein, Inés (curaduria) (2006). Andy Warhol motion pictures, cuadros en movimiento (Exhibition catalog) (in Spanish). Buenos Aires: Malba Coleccion Costantini. ISBN 9789871271009. OCLC 951404200. – Catalog of an exhibition held at Museo de Arte Latinoamericano, Buenos Aires, Sept. 23-Nov. 21, 2005
- Katzenstein, Inés (textos de); Pacheco, Marcelo E.; Sato, Amalia (2006). Pombo (in Spanish and English). Buenos Aires: Adriana Hidalgo Editora. ISBN 978-9-871-15654-2. OCLC 137316869.
- Kuitca, Guillermo; Katzenstein, Inés (curated by) (2007). Guillermo Kuitca: si yo fuera el invierno mismo (Exhibition catalog) (in Spanish, Italian, and English). Buenos Aires: Fundación ArteBA. ISBN 978-9-872-18224-3. OCLC 294998307. – Representacion Argentina, 52. Esposizione internazionale d'arte, La biennale di Venezia. Catalogue of an exhibition held during the 52nd BIennale di Venezia from 6 Jun. to 23 Sept. 2007
- Katzenstein, Inés (curaduría de) (2007). Vida en movimiento: Joaquim Pedro de Andrade (in Spanish). Buenos Aires: Malba: Fundación Eduardo F. Costantini. ISBN 978-9-871-27108-5. OCLC 231715816. – Accompanies a retrospective exhibition organized by the 9th Buenos Aires Festival Internacional de Cine Independiente, April 13-June 11, 2007
- Medina, Cuauhtémoc; Araujo, Marcelo Mattos; Katzenstein, Inés; Oles, James; Lerner, Adam; Muñoz, Oscar; Quijano, Rodrigo; Sibaja, Ruth (2008). "Reactivando el canon local: el nuevo coleccionismo de los museos públicos en América Latina; Hacia el salón del siglo XXI: más allá del centro de exhibición" (Conference publication). Auditorio arteBA08. Arte global, arte latinoamericano: Nuevas estrategias (in Spanish and English). Buenos Aires, Argentina: ArteBA Fundación. pp. 114–156, 157–231. ISBN 978-9-872-18226-7. OCLC 641508911. – Auditorio arteBA'08, 29 de mayo al 1o. de junio de 2008
- Katzenstein, Inés (2010). "Leap Backwards into the Future: Paul Ramirez Jonas, 2004". In Le Feuvre, Lisa (ed.). Failure: Documents of Contemporary Art. London: Whitechapel Gallery. ISBN 978-0-262-51477-4. OCLC 540644017.
- Katzenstein, Inés (Summer 2010). "Inés Katzenstein". Artforum. 48 (10).
- Katzenstein, Inés (2011). "Avatars of art in the Argentina of the 1990s". In Davila-Villa, Ursula (ed.). Recovering Beauty: The 1990s in Buenos Aires. Austin, Texas: Blanton Museum of Art at the University of Texas at Austin. pp. 33–44. ISBN 978-0-981-57385-4. OCLC 694827562.
- Cippolini, Rafael (curated by); Katzenstein, Inés (curated by) (2011). Televisión: El Di Tella y un episodio en la historia de la TV (Exhibition catalog) (in Spanish). Buenos Aires: Espacio Fundación Telefónica. ISBN 978-9-872-32815-3. OCLC 809028723. – Catalogue of an exhibition held at Espacio Fundación Telefónica (Buenos Aires), 22 Oct. - 18 Dec. 2010
- Saraceno, Tomás; Katzenstein, Inés; Malone, Meredith; Marjanović, Igor; Weaire, Denis (2012). Malone, Meredith; Marjanović, Igor (eds.). Tomas Saraceno: Cloud-Specific (Exhibition catalog). St. Louis, MO: Mildred Lane Kemper Art Museum. ISBN 978-0-936-31635-2. OCLC 760972995. – Catalog of an exhibition held at the Sam Fox School of Design & Visual Arts at Washington University in St. Louis, September 9, 2011 – January 9, 2012
- Katzenstein, Inés (January 2001). "Good Business is the Best Art: Twenty Years of the Artist in the Marketplace". Review: Literature and Arts of the Americas. 34 (63): 84. doi:10.1080/08905760108594681. ISSN 0890-5762. OCLC 4901561191. S2CID 142815780.
- Porter, Liliana; Katzenstein, Inés; Volk, Gregory (Introduction by) (2013). Liliana Porter in conversation with / en conversación con Inés Katzenstein (in English and Spanish). New York, NY/Caracas, Venezuela: Fundación Cisneros/Colección Patricia Phelps de Cisneros. ISBN 978-0-982-35447-6. OCLC 934834918. Wikidata ()
- Katzenstein, Inés (2015). Marcelo Pombo, un artista del pueblo (in Spanish). Ciudad Autónoma de Buenos Aires: Fundación Amalia Lacroze de Fortabat. ISBN 978-9-874-54646-3. OCLC 965755639.
- Katzenstein, Inés; Iglesias, Claudio (2017). ¿Es el arte un misterio o un ministerio? El arte contemporáneo frente a los desafíos del profesionalismo (in Spanish and English). Buenos Aires: Siglo Veintiuno editores: Universidad Torcuato di Tella. ISBN 9789876297301. OCLC 994153859.
