= Pip Day =

Curator and writer

Pip Day is a Canadian/Irish/British curator and writer. She was the Director/Curator of the SBC Gallery of Contemporary Art in Montreal from 2012 to 2019.

Day obtained a master's degree in Curatorial Studies at the Center for Curatorial Studies, Bard College and a BA in Art History from the University of Toronto.

She is a contributing editor to Cabinet Magazine and has written for catalogues and journals such as Art Review, Curare and Photography Quarterly. Day contributed an essay to the catalogue From Conceptualism to Feminism: Lucy Lippard’s Numbers Shows 1969–74 where she wrote on artists' initiatives in Argentina and their influence on Lippard's developing political consciousness.

Day established the research collective El Instituto which is currently headquartered in Mexico City. Since 2011, El Instituto has been operating as a non-for-profit organization exploring the invisible nature of politics concerning, "the overlap between art, culture, activism and human rights theory and practice, both locally and internationally". The project which features exhibitions, workshops, conferences and other various events is sponsored by the US Embassy, and The Andy Warhol Foundation for the Visual Arts.
