= Bart Cassiman =

Belgian art critic

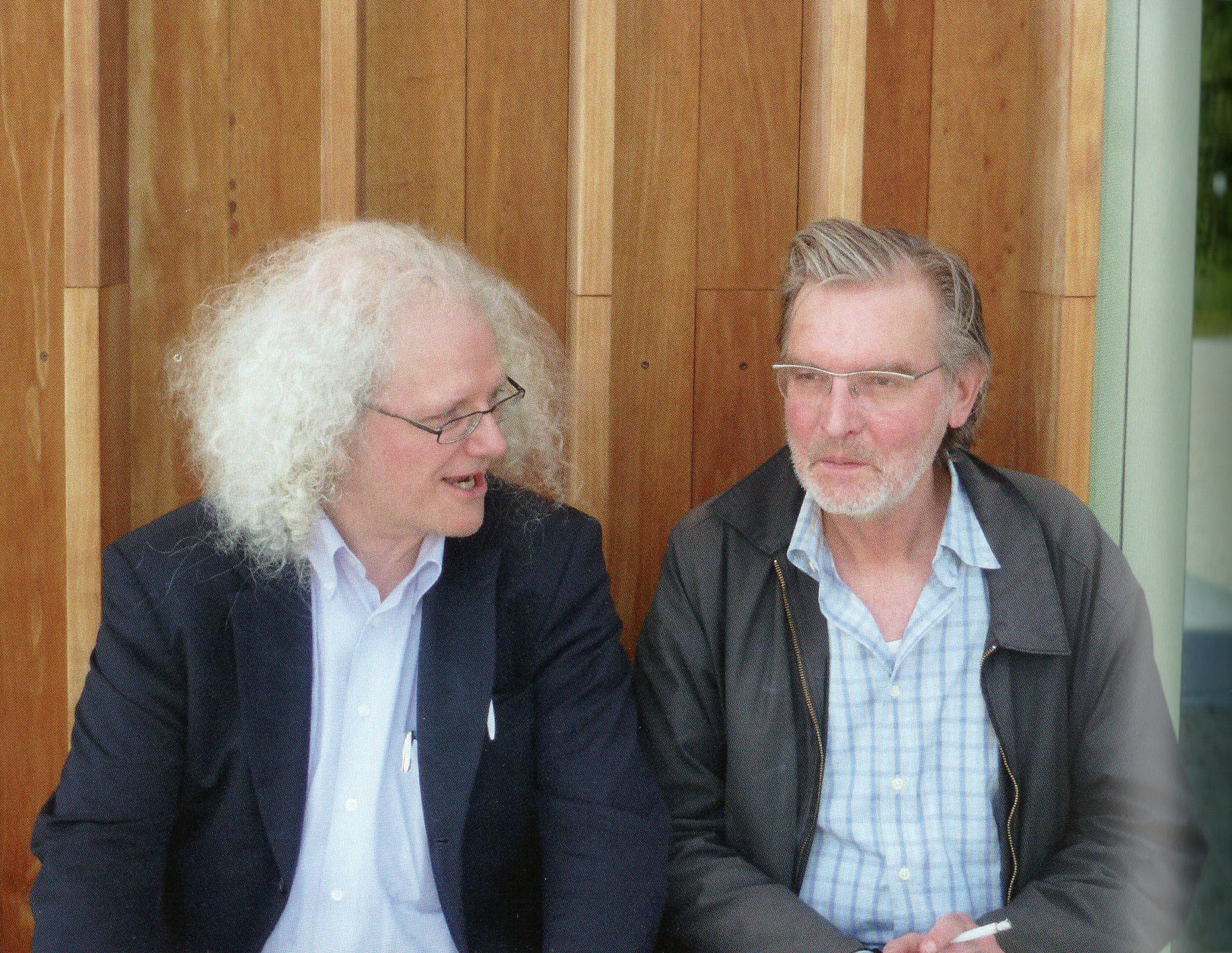
Bart Cassiman (left) meeting with the sculptor Thomas Schütte, after many years, at the Skulpturenhalle in Neus (2017)

Bart Cassiman (born 1961) is a Belgian international freelance curator, editor, art critic and historian. He studied press and communication sciences at the Ghent University (1979-1984).

== Early career ==
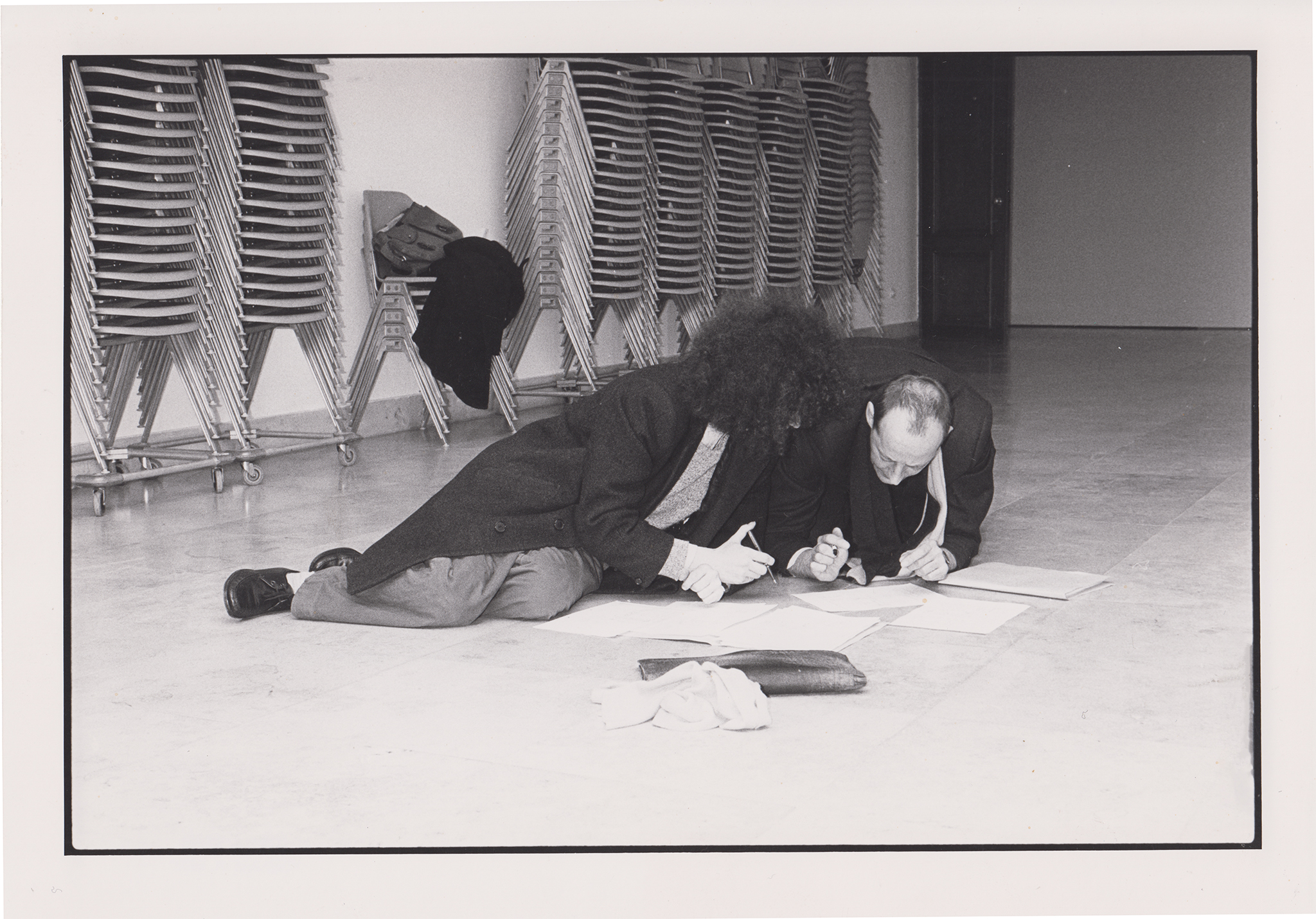
Kasper König in conversation with Bart Cassiman. (1986)

He was the project-leader of the exhibition Initiatief 86 which took place in the St. Pieters Abbey and the Museum of Contemporary Art of Ghent in 1986. This was an exhibition on Belgian art for which Kasper König, Jan Hoet, Jean-Hubert Martin and Gosse Oosterhof made the selection. The exhibition included a.o. works by Chantal Akerman, Guillaume Bijl, Jacques Charlier, Luc Deleu, Lili Dujourie, Jef Geys, René Heyvaert, Raoul De Keyser, Marie-Jo Lafontaine, Panamarenko, Guy Rombouts, Walter Swennen, Narcisse Tordoir, Jan Vercruysse and Didier Vermeiren,...

From September 1986 until the end of 1988, Bart Cassiman was curator for Contemporary Art at the Palais des Beaux-Arts (BOZAR) in Brussels where he organized (in collaboration with the director Jan Debbaut) several exhibitions of contemporary art (Didier Vermeiren, Narcisse Tordoir, Art & Language, Jan Vercruysse, Luciano Fabro, Per Kirkeby...)

== Curatorial practice ==
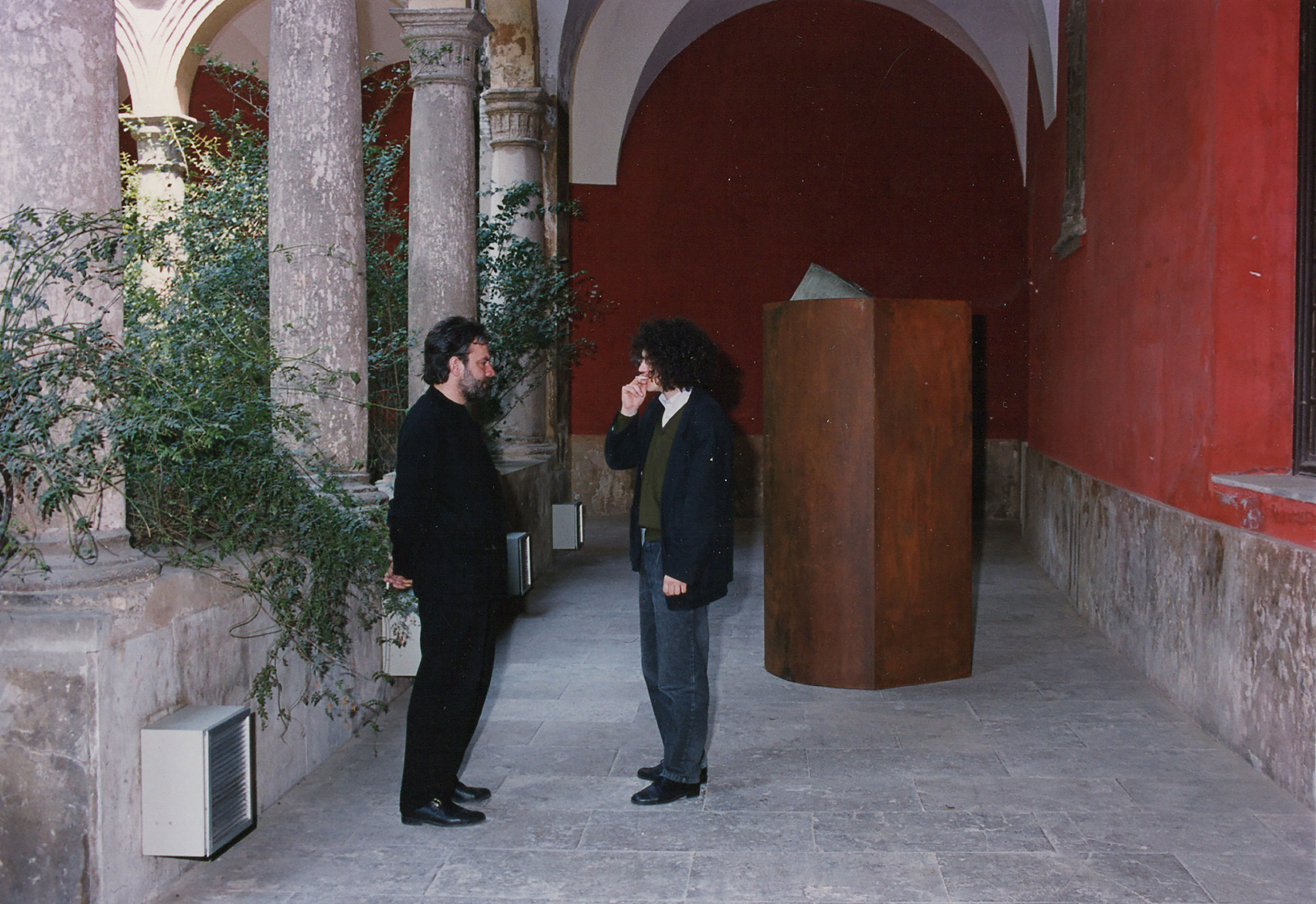
Thierry de Cordier & Bart Cassiman next to a sculpture by Cristina Iglesias, Espacio Mental, IVAM, Valencia (1991)

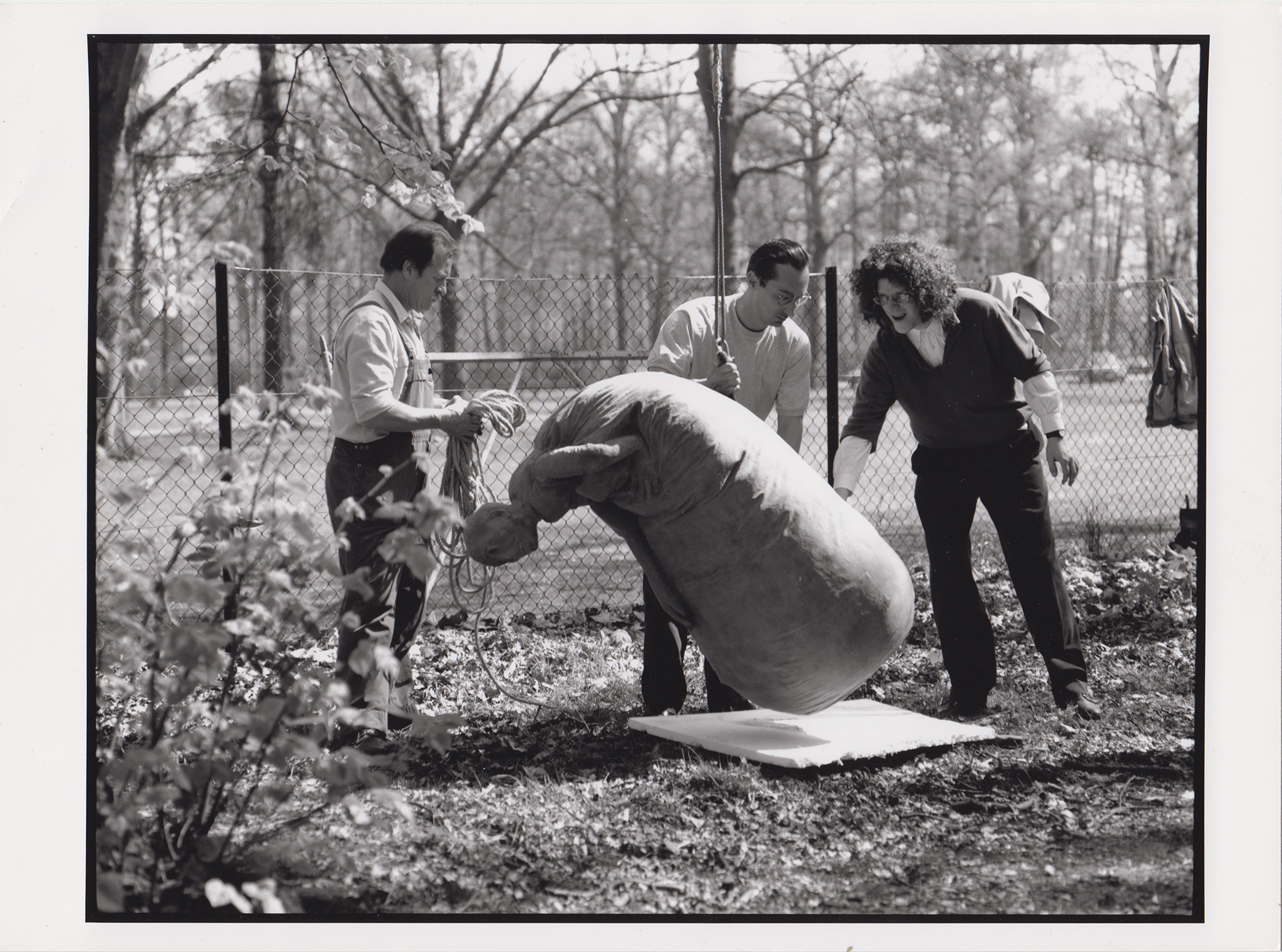
Juan Muñoz & Bart Cassiman during the installation of 'Two Figures for Middelheim' (1993)

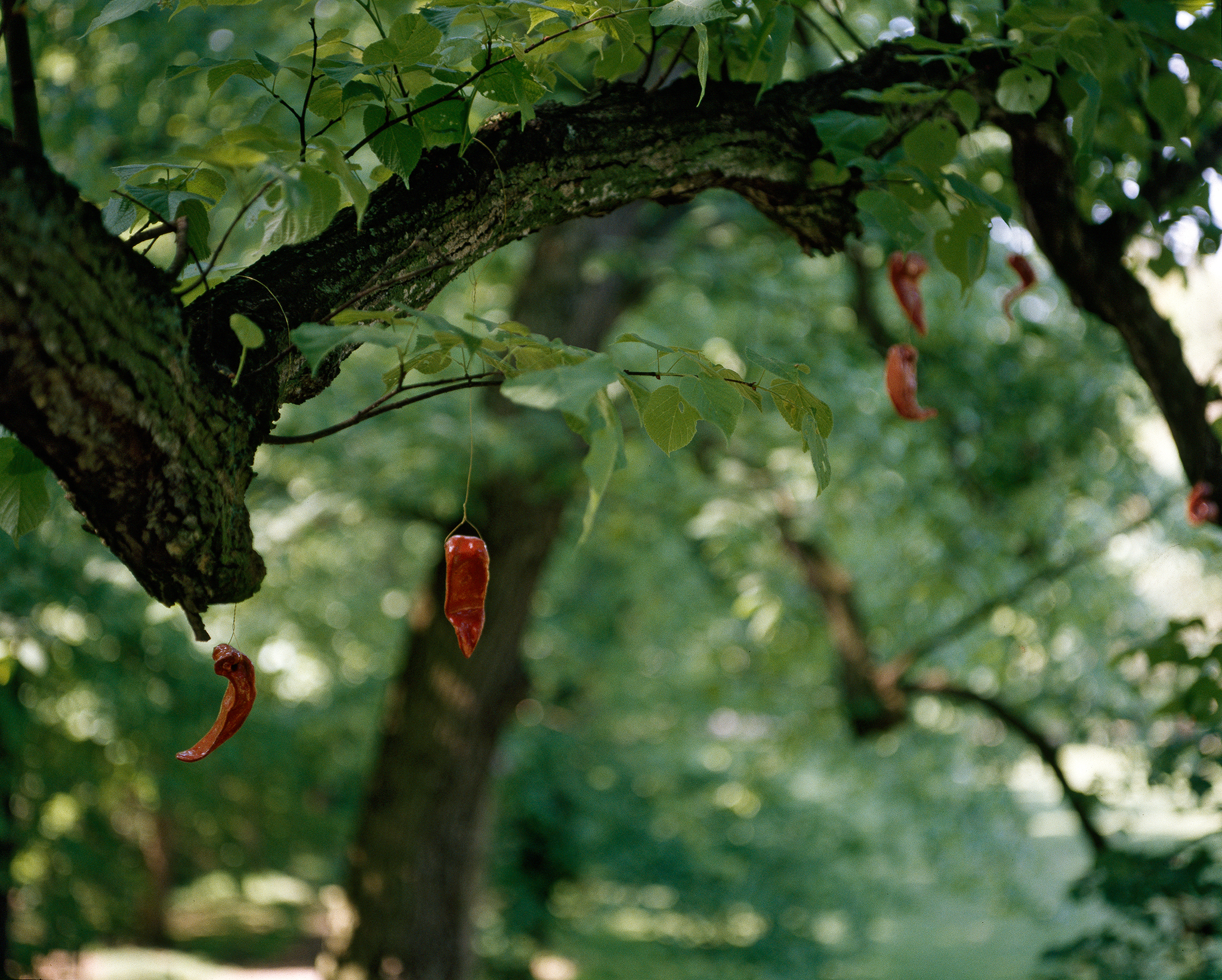
Thomas Schütte, 'Thousand Tongues' - New Sculptures, Middelheim Museum, Antwerp (1993)

As a free-lance curator he organized several exhibitions between 1989 and 1991. Amongst others:

- Rombouts and Tordoir, Douglas Hyde Gallery, Dublin, 1989.
- Noli me tangere - with Lili Dujourie and Cristina Iglesias, Locus Solus - Genova, Italy, 1990.
- De Pictura - an exhibition on motive and alibi in the painting of Herbert Brandl, Helmut Dorner, John Murphy, Mitja Tušek, Narcisse Tordoir and Walter Swennen - Bruges La Morte, Bruges, 1990.
- The solo exhibitions of Lili Dujourie, Kunstverein, Bonn, 1989; Le Magasin, Grenoble, 1990.

Espacio Mental with René Daniëls, Thierry De Cordier, Isa Genzken, Cristina Iglesias, Thomas Schütte and Jan Vercruysse at Valencia, IVAM-El Carme in 1991 was his first major group show. The exhibition contained about 80 artworks, was complex and layered so that the different interrelations between the artworks became almost endless.

Bart Cassiman was the project-leader of the section Contemporary Visual Art of Antwerp 93, European Capital of Culture. For this temporary organization he realized three major projects which differed in terms of intent and content.

For the Middelheim Museum he invited ten artists (Per Kirkeby, Richard Deacon, Panamarenko, Thomas Schütte, Juan Muñoz, Matt Mullican, Bernd Lohaus, Harald Klingelhöller, Didier Vermeiren, Isa Genzken) to make a work, which was bought by Antwerp 93 for the permanent collection. They were placed on Middelheim Low, which became by doing so the section of contemporary art of the museum. A section invented by Cassiman and realized with the support of Bob Cools (The Mayor), Eric Antonis (the intendant of Antwerp 93) and Hans Nieuwdorp (the director of the Art Historical Museums of the City of Antwerp). This project became known as New Sculptures.

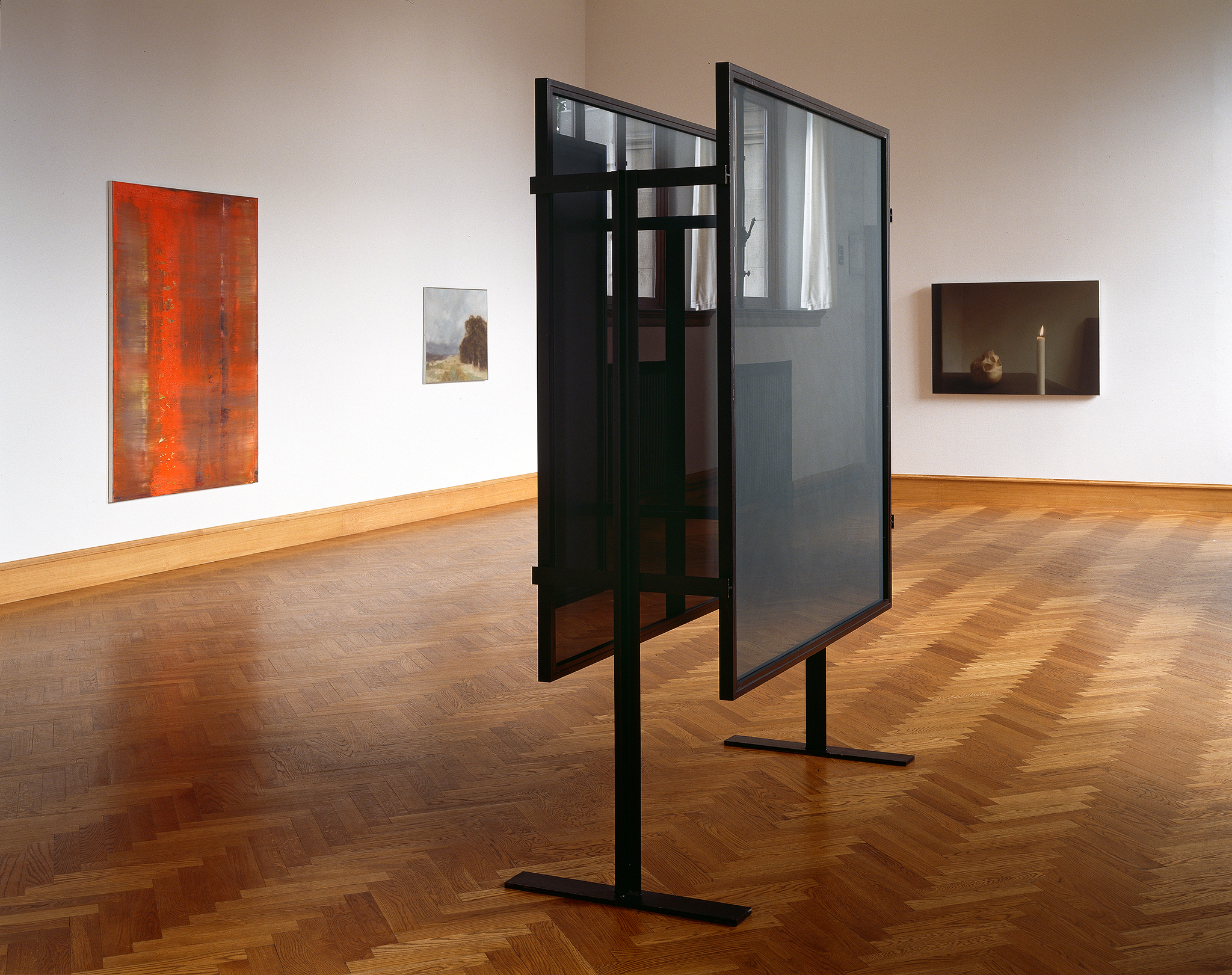
Gerhard Richter - The Sublime Void, Royal Museum of Fine Arts, Antwerp (1993)

For the first time, the Royal Museum of Fine Arts hosted contemporary artists who gave form to entwining of remembrance and imagination in the creative process. This project (exhibition and book), The Sublime Void (on the memory of the imagination), included the artists Jean-Marc Bustamante, Jan Vercruysse, Rachel Whiteread, Juan Muñoz, Niek Kemps, John Murphy, Mitja Tušek, Gerhard Richter, Michelangelo Pistoletto, Luc Tuymans, Robert Gober, Cristina Iglesias, Harald Klingelhöller, Didier Vermeiren, Thomas Schütte, Ettore Spalletti, Luciano Fabro, Jeff Wall, Jannis Kounellis, René Daniels, Franz West, Fortuyn/O’Brien, James Welling, Lili Dujourie and Thierry De Cordier. The accompanying publication contains texts, essays, poems etc. by a.o. Adorno, Augustinus, Baudelaire, Benjamin, Blanchot, Borges, Broch, Canetti, Handke, Hölderlin, Kafka, Kristeva, Musil, Michelangelo, Nietzsche, Pascal, Proust, Rilke, Valery, Wenders, Wordsworth...It has been rewarded with the Gouden penning van Plantijn-Moretus, an award for the best book published in 1993.

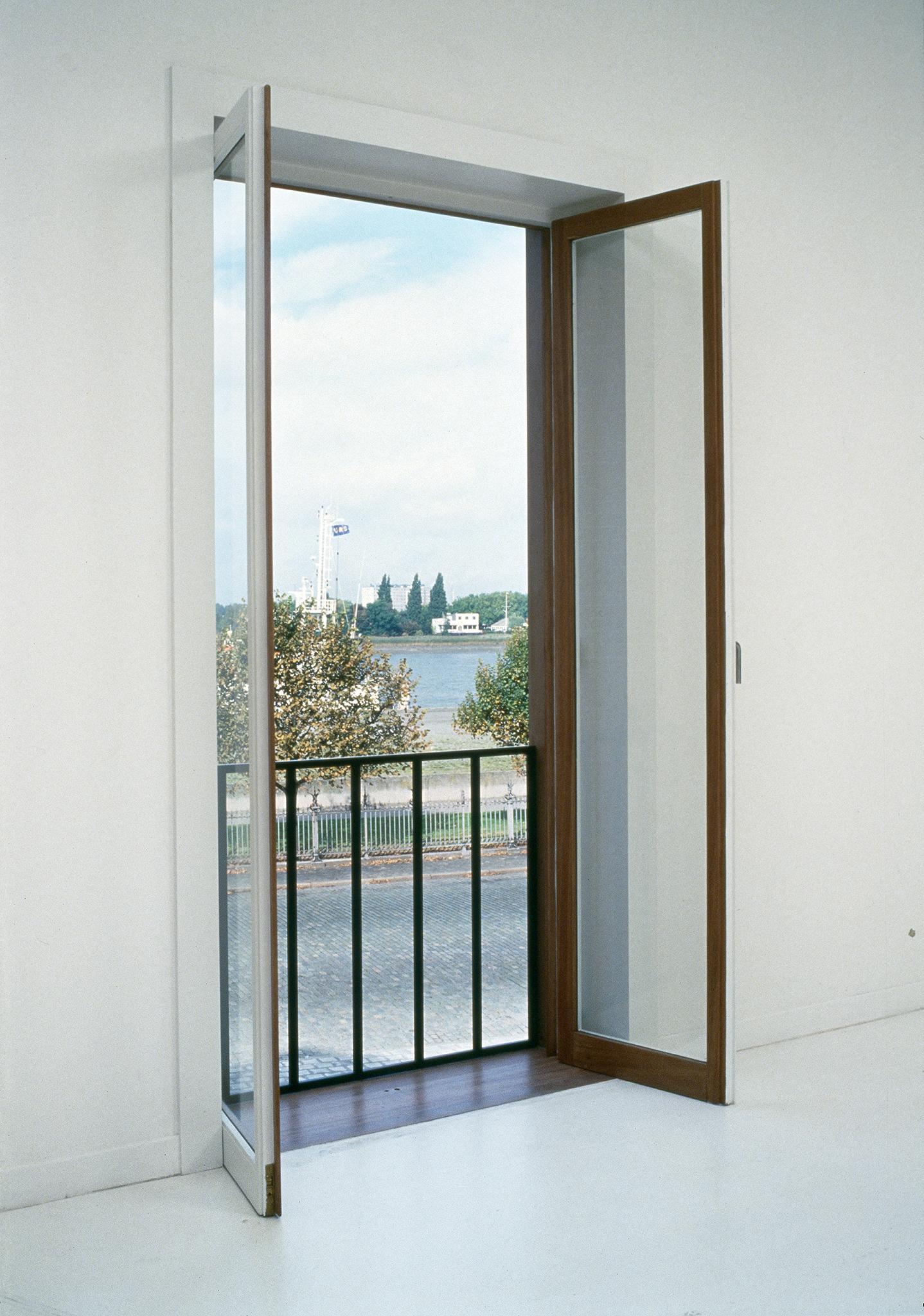
Maria Eichhorn, 'French Window' - On taking a normal situation..., MuHKA, Antwerp (1993)

For the third project, he invited after conscientiously research and several workshops three colleagues-curators (Iwona Blazwick, Yves Aupetitallot and Carolyn-Christov Bakargiev) to make an exhibition with artists from different cultural backgrounds to produce a new work in the extended M HKA. The for a long time underestimated exhibition On taking a normal situation and translating it into overlapping and multiple readings of conditions past and present which included at that time a few well-known artists (such as Jimmy Durham, Mark Dion, Eugenio Dittborn, Judith Barry and Renée Green) in combination with a lot of artists who were at the beginning of their public life and have since then co-determined the international discourse for years (Maria Eichhorn, Zarina Bhimji, Ann Veronica Janssens, Andrea Fraser,...)

From 1994 until 1998 he was member of the advisory-committee of the Middelheim Museum, Antwerp.

Bart Cassiman was part of the Jury of the Mies van der Rohe Stipendium Krefeld (1990-1995) and of the program-commission of the Appel Foundation, Amsterdam (1989-1993).

In 1995 he realized an exhibition with Dora García, Dianne Hagen, Gert Verhoeven, Lisa May Post, Anne-Marie Schneider and Stephen Wilks, at Galerie Nelson, Paris. In the same year he co-ordinated the project Arte Habitable with Alicia Framis. He wrote the essay for the catalogue which he edited too.

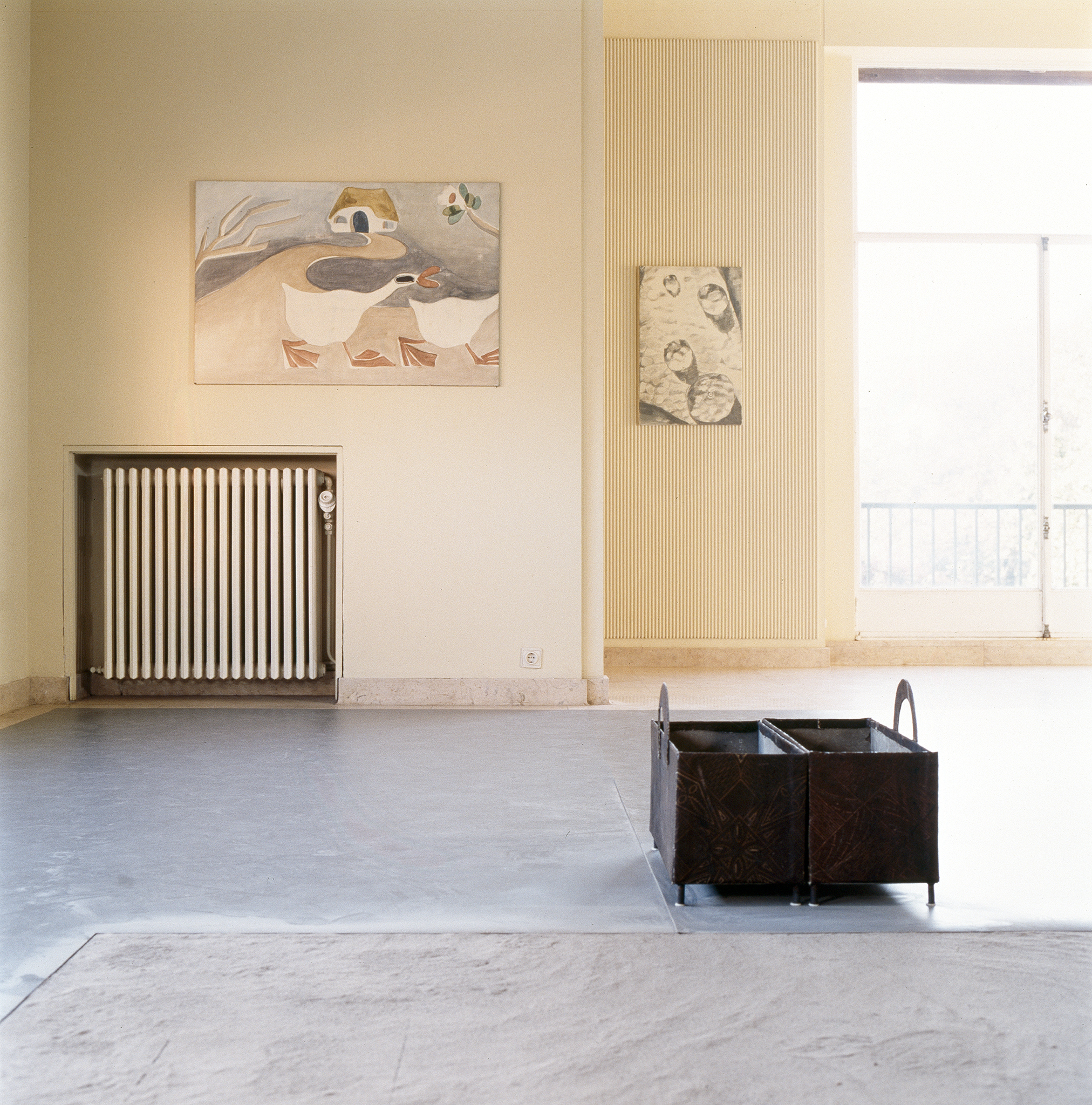
Privacy: Tuymans – Balka, Serralves, Porto (1998)

In 1997 Bart Cassiman curated the exhibition and edited the publication Green Easter (with Dianne Hagen, Carla Klein, Aglaia Konrad, Peter Rogiers, Stephen Wilks and Robert Suermondt) at the Museum Dhondt-Dhaenens, Deurle. He wrote a substantial essay on the work of Lili Dujourie and edited the catalogue and curated the show at Lisson Gallery, London.

At the Rijksakademie in Amsterdam he curated the Open Studio’s 1997. This project included more than 50 young artists, such as Carlos Amorales, Emmanuelle Antille, Lise Baggesen, Maura Biava, Franck Bragigand, Jeroen Eisinga, Meshac Gaba, Winneke Gartz, Mark Hosking, Runa Islam, Saskia Janssen, Moshekwa Langa, Fang Lijun, Xavier Noiret-Thomé, Els Opsomer, Ebru Özseçen, Anne Van der Plas, De Rijke/De Rooij, Emmanuel Ropers, Dierk Schmidt, Tim Stoner, Tomoko Take, Fiona Tan, Hermann Terrier, Claire Todd, Vera Weisgerber, Edwin Zwakman,...

At the end of 1997 he organized also two exhibitions with the Belgian painter Jan Van Imschoot. In Hasselt (Provinciaal Museum) he curated his first painting overview. In Amsterdam (Artbook) he curated an exhibition on drawings.

In 1998 he organized his - until today - last exhibition: Privacy: Tuymans – Balka for Serralves, Porto.

In 2000 he was responsible for the Flemish selection for the Milano Europa 2000 project. The selected artists were: Marie José Burki, Jan Van Imschoot and Gert Verhoeven.

== Art critic ==
Bart Cassiman is also active as a freelance art-critic, having written essays for catalogues on a.o. René Daniëls, Raoul De Keyser, Harald Klingelhöller, Lili Dujourie, Cristina Iglesias, Jan Vercruysse, Thierry De Cordier, Paul Robbrecht, Walter Swennen, Narcisse Tordoir, Juan Muñoz, Thomas Schütte, Isa Genzken, Alicia Framis, Robert Suermondt, Aglaia Konrad, Carla Klein,... and several articles for national and international newspapers and art-magazines (De Standaard, De Morgen, Knack (magazine), Kunst & Museumjournaal, Meta, Artefactum, Kunst Nu, Metropolis M and Flash Art), about art policy and specific subjects related to art.

In 1989 he edited the first small monography De architectuur en het beeld (The Architecture and the Image) on the work of the architects Paul Robbrecht / Hilde Daem. In 1995 he did the same on the work of Thierry De Cordier with a text of Stefan Hertmans.

In 1996/1997 he is a member of the staff of editors of DWB (Dietsche Warande en Belfort), an important magazine on literature. For this he edited in collaboration with Peter Verhelst a special number (DWB 6/97) on Juan Muñoz.

== Teaching ==
On the level of education, Bart Cassiman has been, besides for almost a decade (1989 – 1998) professor at the Rijksakademie, Amsterdam, a guest-lecturer at the Appel Foundation in Amsterdam and Le Magasin in Grenoble (for the curator training which is organized by those institutes), at Sotheby's London (educational studies for future artworld professionals) and at P.A.R.T.S., the institute for dance founded by Anne Teresa De Keersmaeker of Rosas.

Since 1985 he participated at many lectures, symposiums and workshops on the subject of contemporary art, organised by different museums, art institutions and galleries. Amongst others in Geneva he participated at the symposium La possibilité de l’art. Où commence, où finit l’art dans le monde de l’art contemporain (25-26 February 1989, Centre d’art contemporain) and in Stuttgart at A new spirit in curating (25-26 January 1992, Künstlerhaus). He was a member of the study group which prepared the symposium Writing about art (1991, Van Abbe Museum, Eindhoven). At the occasion of the publication Art, gallery, exhibition. The gallery as a vehicle for art, edited by gallery Andriesse and De Balie, Amsterdam, he took part in the symposiums organized in Amsterdam (7 September 1996), Rotterdam (8 September 1996) and Antwerp (8 October 1996). In Brussels (25-26 October 1996) he participated at the colloquium Art et commande publics, organized by Encore Bruxelles.

== The Absent Museum ==
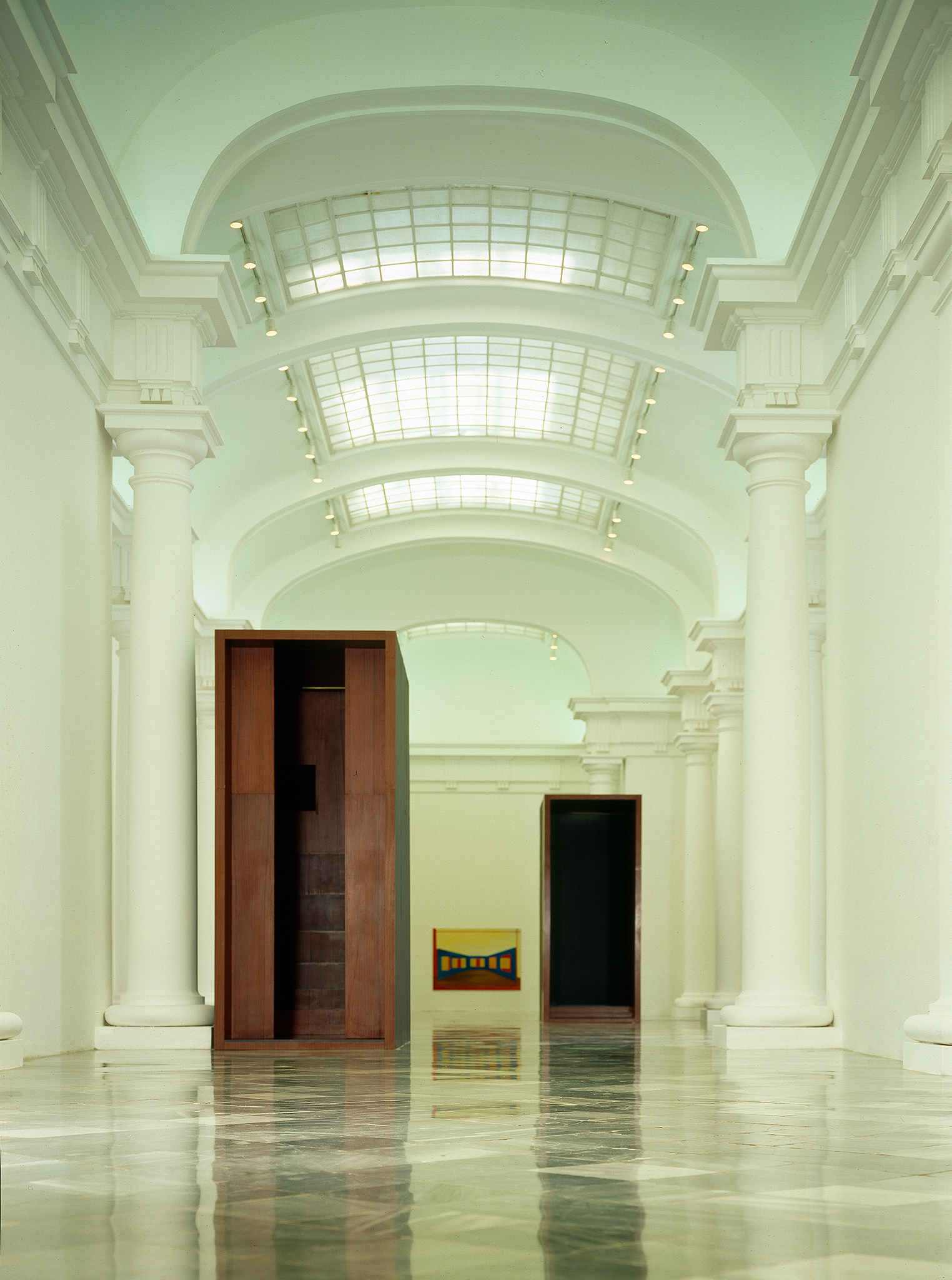
Jan Vercruysse & René Daniëls - installation view: Espacio Mental, IVAM, Valencia (1991)

From 1989 until 2000 he was responsible for the BACOB bank collection of contemporary art. The collection contained at the end about 180 works of around 40 different international artists, a.o. Stan Douglas, Franz West, Herbert Brandl, Lili Dujourie, Cristina Iglesias, Thomas Schütte, Harald Klingelhöller, Allan McCollum, Narcisse Tordoir, Helmut Dorner, Luc Tuymans, Jan Fabre, Bazilebustamante, Jean-Marc Bustamante, Thierry De Cordier, James Welling, Juan Muñoz, Jan Vercruysse, Mitja Tušek, Gert Verhoeven, Stephen Wilks, Dianne Hagen, Jan Van Imschoot, Robert Suermondt, Carla Klein, Niek Kemps, Alicia Framis, Isa Genzken, Ebru Özseçen, Gregor Schneider, Valerie Mannaerts, Bjarne Melgaard, Mike Kelley, Carlos Amorales, Miroslav Balka.

Due to a severe illness Bart Cassiman was forced to stop all his professional activities at the end of the nineties. Without any doubt one can say that he was one of the most active and energized persons of the artworld between the mid-eighties and the end of the nineties. With colleagues such as Saskia Bos, Ulrich Loock, Julian Heynen, Dennis Zacharopoulos and a few others he was responsible for the visualization of a generation by making exhibitions and writing texts and convincing many museums and collectors to buy their works.

The bank for which he collected more than a decade bought as a result of his engagement and advise the well-known Vanderborght building in the heart of Brussels, at the end of the nineties. Everything was prepared to open the first private (corporate) museum on this scale in Western Europe. The opening was planned for the spring of 2002. But because the engine of this whole operation fell silent the project died a quiet dead. Big parts of the collection were sold and so stays the capital of Europe deprived of an urgently needed Museum of Contemporary Art...
