= Willy van Sompel =

Belgian painter (born 1948)

Willy Van Sompel (born 20 October 1948 in Ghent) is a Belgian painter. In the 1970s he worked as a writer and in the theatre. The screenplay he wrote for the feature film Het einde van de reis (1981) was awarded by the Ministry of Dutch Culture. At the end of that decade, as a self-taught artist, he turned to painting. From 1981 he designed sets for theatre productions by Arne Sierens.

He painted recognisable clichéd images: sinking ocean liners, flower still lifes, waterfalls. He surrounded them with decorative patterns, glitter and tinsel. Art historian Lieven Van den Abeele placed this work within postmodernism in 1986. From 1987 his focus shifted to ornament itself, and he made multiples and objects in sandblasted glass.

In 1985 Van Sompel received two distinctions: the prize of the Ghent Art Salon and the Prijs Pierre Crowet, one of the prizes within the Prize for Young Belgian Painting. A year later he was one of the organisers of Antichambre, the exhibition staged during the Ghent art summer opposite Chambres d'Amis and Initiatief 86. His work is held in the collections of the S.M.A.K. in Ghent and the Stedelijk Museum Amsterdam. He later withdrew from art.

== Career ==
=== Writing, theatre and film ===
Van Sompel's award-winning screenplay formed the basis for Het einde van de reis ("The End of the Journey"), the last feature film produced in Flanders in 1980. Director Peter Simons released it in January 1981 at the Brussels Festival, with Chris Lomme as a forty-year-old woman who fears losing her daughters.

=== Turn to painting ===
From 1979 Van Sompel began to paint. He started with large canvases of sinking ships in bright colours; according to him these ocean liners stood for the knowledge and power of the West. In March 1983 the Paul Dewever gallery in Wakken showed his work alongside ceramics by Della Calberson. Critic Hugo Brutin wrote in Arts Antiques Auctions that the work was marked by the new wild painting and was supple and powerful in execution. Galerie Swart in Amsterdam, which in those years focused on postmodern art, also showed work by Van Sompel and by Wim Delvoye.

=== Two prizes in 1985 ===
In 1985 Ghent city council revived the tradition of the Ghent Art Salon (Gents Kunstsalon), dormant since 1946. Each artist from Greater Ghent could submit up to three paintings, and more than three hundred entries were received. The jury — Lieven Daenens, Robert Hoozee, Jan Hoet, Rita Van De Capelle and Paul Vlaeminck — unanimously chose the work Van Sompel had entered under the motto Nooit meer modern ("Never modern again"): a vase of golden flowers against a pink background. All entries were on view until 28 April, with the public able to award a prize of its own.

A few weeks later he also became a laureate of the Prijs Pierre Crowet. That prize was awarded for the first time that year within the competition of the Prize for Young Belgian Painting, whose rules had been broadened to all disciplines, roughly doubling the number of entries to about five hundred. The Prize for Young Belgian Painting itself went to Marin Kasimir and the Emile Langui Prize to the photographer Stephen Sack. The work of the laureates and of 53 other selected artists was on view until 7 April at the Palace of Fine Arts in Brussels.

=== Antichambre and the 1986 art summer ===
In the summer of 1986 two large events dominated Ghent: Chambres d'Amis, curated by Jan Hoet, and Initiatief 86 at St Peter's Abbey. Work by Van Sompel was selected for Initiatief 86 by Jean-Hubert Martin. His dissatisfaction with the approach of that exhibition, which he associated with modernist ideals, became an important motive for a counter-initiative.

Together with Piet Vanrobaeys, Jan van Opstal, Luk van Haegenborgh and Bartel Joris Edmund, he set up Antichambre in the former Alsberge-Van Oost textile factory on the Drongensesteenweg. The exhibition opened on 14 June 1986, a week before the official events, and ran until 1 August. Any artist who wished to take part was given space on the 22-hectare site, and the number of participants grew from 130 to about 200. There were no subsidies or sponsorship, so the artists bore the costs of the works and the catalogue themselves.

That same summer a painted flower still life by Van Sompel hung in the Groninger Museum's summer display, which under the title Figuratie, Decoratie, Ornament brought together work by New York and Berlin artists. In December 1986 an exhibition at Galerie Swart in Amsterdam followed. A review in Algemeen Dagblad wrote that he opposed the notion of the avant-garde and the idea that art, through a series of innovations, would arrive at a single true work of art, and described his orange frames with rosette patterns and his scenes of spurting glitter.

=== Film and theatre ===
In 1987 Van Sompel made the short film Van utopie naar chaos ("From Utopia to Chaos") with Eugène van den Bosch and Hens van Rooij, about his own work. The 25-minute film was shown at the Netherlands Film Festival that year; Van Sompel co-wrote the screenplay and provided the music.

For the comic space opera De liefde voor de drie manen ("The Love for the Three Moons"), loosely after Carlo Gozzi's L'amore delle tre melarance, he designed the set; Arne Sierens wrote the libretto and directed, and Johan De Smet composed the music. The production premiered on 16 April 1988 at De Vooruit in Ghent. The following year came Je pleure des bananes, an opera by Sierens and De Smet after Sierens' play De reis naar het donkere kontinent, directed by Sam Bogaerts. He then made the sets for Sierens' song cycle Ambetango, performed in various line-ups between 1991 and 1993, and for Kaïet Kaïet (1992).

=== Exhibitions in 1988 ===
In the spring of 1988, work from the period 1981 to 1987 was on view at the Beursschouwburg in Brussels. Around the same time, Galerie de Fiets in Delft showed work by ten Belgian artists, including Narcisse Tordoir, Guillaume Bijl, Guy Rombouts, Van Sompel and Jan Vercruysse. In the autumn the Salon de Montrouge near Paris devoted a separate exhibition to contemporary Belgian artists, with, besides Van Sompel, Bijl, Jacques Charlier, Jacques Lizène, Rombouts and Walter Swennen.

=== Ornament, multiples and glass ===
Between 1987 and 1989 his work shifted from painting to ornament itself. According to art historian Marek Wieczorek, Van Sompel made repetition his subject rather than avoiding it. In Paratopy (1989) he covered two walls of a gallery with printed, hand-coloured formica trays, on which computer graphics depicted the interior of that same gallery. Reflections of a Banal Utopia (1989) is a round tray on which dance steps are printed over the face of God the Father from the Ghent Altarpiece by Jan van Eyck. In The Lying Truths (1988), convex mirrors in gold frames are printed on raw silk, with the motto Honi soit qui mal y pense on the frame. In 1989 the Richard Foncke Gallery in Ghent showed his work under the title De beschaafde antropofaag ("The Civilised Anthropophagus").

From 1990 he worked in sandblasted glass. This series includes the empty display cases Custos Morum (1990) and a set of glass columns in which he wanted to sandblast, alphabetically, the signatures of all Belgian artists, more than three thousand of them. These columns were shown in 1991 at Galerie Richard Foncke in Ghent. According to NRC Handelsblad, he used them to comment ironically on the decline of artistic integrity and on the power of a handful of exhibition-makers. A year earlier, at the same gallery, he had taken part in You're right to laugh, an exhibition of ironic sculptures and installations with, among others, Georg Herold and René Heyvaert.

=== Later years ===
At the end of 1991, work by Van Sompel was included in Kunst in Vlaanderen, NU, a selection from the acquisitions the Flemish Community had made over ten years, at the Museum of Contemporary Art in Antwerp. In September 1993 the Flemish Cultural Centre De Brakke Grond in Amsterdam opened its season with paintings by him.

In 1994 he made Opgeruimd staat netjes, a computer print on canvas. In the visitor booklet for the exhibition Re-figuratie (Museumcultuur Strombeek/Gent, 2013), where that work hung together with Nooit meer modern III, it was described as an ironic and programmatic farewell to painting. The same text states that Van Sompel had turned his back on art years earlier and lives abroad.

== Work ==
In the 1980s Van Sompel worked on a large scale, mostly in acrylic. His motifs were clichés: sinking ships, flowers, mountain peaks, princesses and waterfalls. He painted them in bright colours and surrounded them with decorative patterns of glitter and tinsel. For a series of monumental canvases he first painted a ground referring to wallpaper or oilcloth, and set banal objects on it. He worked with spray can, stencils and airbrush, and assembled existing objects into the painting.

In a 1986 article in the magazine Artefactum, art historian Lieven Van den Abeele wrote that Van Sompel's paintings lie at the interface between the false sentiment of kitschy back-kitchen culture and art. He linked the work to features Ihab Hassan attributed to postmodernism: the artist's self-reflection on the creative process, ironic and parodic forms, the use of fragments rather than closed wholes, and an anarchic rather than hierarchical character.

In the survey Painting in Flanders after 1980, Marc Ruyters places him alongside his fellow townsman Philippe Vandenberg: where Vandenberg painted sombrely, Van Sompel's work looked cheerful and full of kitsch, yet beneath the layer of flowers and mountain peaks lay the same existential rebelliousness and artistic anarchism. In Fragmenten van kunst in België (1990), Van den Abeele groups his paintings with those of Franky DC and Walter Swennen as work in which the impulsive touch gives way to images from a legible, popular iconography with ambiguous and ironising overtones. In the same issue Dirk Pültau writes of the ship paintings that the massive character of the hull is a farce, and that the fairground colours and golden tendrils draped across the canvas flatten that effect again.

== Works in public collections ==
- S.M.A.K., Ghent: Nooit meer modern III (1985), acrylic on canvas, 160 × 200 cm, acquired in 1985.
- Stedelijk Museum Amsterdam: De onomkeerbaarheid (1986), 167 × 197 cm, object number 1987.1.0170.
- Groninger Museum: Tegenstroom, acrylic on canvas, object number 1987.0507.
- Collection of the Flemish Community, shown at the M HKA in Kunst in Vlaanderen, NU (1991).

== Awards ==
- 1985: Prize of the Ghent Art Salon
- 1985: Prijs Pierre Crowet, within the Prize for Young Belgian Painting

== Filmography ==
- Het einde van de reis (1981), screenplay; directed by Peter Simons
- Van utopie naar chaos (1987), direction, screenplay and music, with Eugène van den Bosch and Hens van Rooij

== Scenography ==
- Slaapkameratleet (1981), after Courteline, adaptation and direction by Arne Sierens, Theater Vertikaal, Ghent
- De liefde voor de drie manen (1988), opera by Arne Sierens and Johan De Smet, De Sluipende Armoede
- Je pleure des bananes (1989), opera by Arne Sierens and Johan De Smet, directed by Sam Bogaerts
- Ambetango (1991, 1992 and 1993), song cycle by Arne Sierens
- Kaïet Kaïet (1992), by Arne Sierens and Paul Carpentier, Eva Bal Speeltheater
