= Xavier Hufkens =

Belgian art dealer and gallery

Xavier Hufkens Gallery
- Formation: 1987
- Headquarters: Brussels St-Georges (6 rue St-Georges) Rivoli (107 rue St-Georges) Van Eyck (44 rue Van Eyck)
- Website: https://www.xavierhufkens.com

Xavier Hufkens Gallery is a contemporary art gallery founded by Belgian art dealer Xavier Hufkens (born 1965). The gallery has three locations in Brussels and represents an international roster of some forty emerging, mid-career, and established artists, as well as a number of estates.

== Development ==
=== 1980s ===
The origins of the gallery date back to 1987, when Xavier Hufkens opened his first gallery on the Parvis de Saint-Gilles in Brussels. Hufkens has stated that his desire to run an art gallery can be traced to his teenage years. During the late 1980s, Franz Erhard Walther showed with Hufkens, as did British sculptor Antony Gormley, whom the gallery continues to represent.

=== 1990s ===
The gallery relocated to a town house in the Brussels district of Ixelles in 1992. Now home to a number of established and upcoming art galleries, the area was almost exclusively residential in the early 1990s. The move was not an obvious one at the time: the Belgian art world still revolved around Antwerp, while the Brussels galleries tended to be based in the up-and-coming districts around the canals or along the fashionable Antoine Dansaertstraat. Belgian architects Paul Robbrecht and Hilde Daem (Robbrecht & Daem), working in partnership with Marie-José Van Hee (MJoseVanHee Architecten), were responsible for the conversion of the house into an art gallery. Landscape architect Jacques Wirtz designed the garden, which is often used to display sculpture. Félix Gonzalez-Torres (1957–1996) held his first exhibition in Europe with Xavier Hufkens in 1991. Four years later, Louise Bourgeois (1911–2010) showed with the gallery – an exhibition that would lead to a fifteen-year collaboration. The estate is still affiliated with the gallery. The gallery's long-standing relationship with Belgian artist Thierry De Cordier also dates back to the 1990s.

Hufkens expanded the gallery further by annexing the adjacent property in 1997. This expanded exhibition programme coincided with the additional representation of a number of established artists from Belgium and abroad, including Richard Artschwager, Roni Horn, and Jan Vercruysse.

== Recent history ==
=== 2000s ===
A number of new artists joined the gallery after the turn of the millennium, including Sterling Ruby, David Altmejd and Daniel Buren. This period of the gallery's history is also defined by a number of landmark exhibitions. In 2000, Xavier Hufkens presented Robert Ryman's first solo exhibition in Belgium since the 1970s. George Condo had his first solo exhibition in Belgium with the gallery in 2006.

=== 2010s ===
As a response to a growing desire for greater flexibility in terms of programming, Xavier Hufkens opened a new 300 sq. metre space in 2013 at 107 rue St-Georges. Based in a commercial shopping centre dating back to the mid-1970s, the space was converted into a gallery by Swiss architect Harry Gugger. A partner of Herzog and De Meuron until 2009, Gugger was one of the architects responsible for the conversion of Tate Modern, London. The gallery works actively with museums and public institutions, particularly in the field of exhibitions. The gallery continued to expand its roster with artists such as Tracey Emin, Paul McCarthy, Walter Swennen, Sherrie Levine, Nicolas Party, Zhang Enli and the Estate of Alice Neel.

=== 2020s ===
In the summer of 2020, Xavier Hufkens temporarily closed the gallery at 6 rue St-Georges for renovations, which coincided with the opening of its third location, designed by Bernard Dubois and located on rue Van Eyck in Brussels. The original architects of the 6 rue St-Georges site, Robbrecht & Daem, were invited to restore and expand the gallery. In March 2022, the gallery announced the new building will open with an exhibition by American artist Christopher Wool. In recent years, artists of multiple generations have joined the gallery’s roster, such as Lynda Benglis, Huma Bhabha, McArthur Binion, Joe Bradley and Sayre Gomez.
