= Project for Sky-Writing (planche nᵒ1) =

Coordinates: 51.2111°N 4.3897°E

Project for Sky-Writing (planche n°1)
- Artist: Robert Filliou
- Year: 1971
- Type: photograph silkscreen
- Dimensions: 69 cm × 96.5 cm (27 in × 38.0 in)

Project for Sky-Writing (planche n°1) is a photograph by artist Robert Filliou from 1971

== Description ==
The photograph is silkscreen printed on paper and has dimensions of 69 x 96.5 cm.

The print is part of the collection of the Museum of Modern Art in Antwerp, Belgium.

== Analysis ==
Robert Filliou was involved in the Fluxus movement. and Dada. In 1971, this work was part of a series of prints exhibited at the Museum of Modern Art.
