= Niek Kemps =

Dutch visual artist

Niek Kemps (born 1952, in Nijmegen) is a Dutch visual artist and lives and works in Amsterdam and Wenduine, Belgium.

== Museums ==
Work of Niek Kemps is represented in the collection of the following museums:

- Stedelijk Van Abbemuseum in Eindhoven
- Stedelijk Museum in Amsterdam
- Museum Boijmans Van Beuningen in Rotterdam
- Rijksmuseum Kröller-Müller in Otterlo
- Stedelijk Museum in Roermond
- Museum van Hedendaagse Kunst (Muhka) in Antwerp, Belgium
- Stedelijk Museum voor Actuele Kunst (SMAK) in Ghent, Belgium

== Exhibitions (selection) ==
- 'The 80's: A Topology', Museo Serralves, Porto, Portugal (2006)
- 'Nederland niet Nederland', Van Abbemuseum, Eindhoven (2004)
- Münsterland Sculpture Biennal, Münsterland (2003)
- 'Ville, le Jardin, la Mémoire', Villa de Medici, Rome, Italy (2000)
- 'L'Ombra degli dei', Mito Greco e arte contemporanea, Palermo, Italy (1998)
- 'Big eyes, small window', Tramway, Glasgow (1996)
- 'Loosely Coupled System', Foksal Galleria, Warschau (1996)
- The Corcoran Museum of Art, Washington D.C. (1995)
- Biennal of Venice, Italy (1993)
- World Expo in Sevilla, Spain (1992)
- 'Opac', Caixa de Pensions, Barcelona, Spain (1991)
- 'TweeTwoDeux', Musee d'Art Moderne, Saint-Étienne, France (1988)
- 'TweeTwoDeux', Museum Boijmans Van Beuningen, Rotterdam (1988)
- Documenta 8, Kassel, Germany (1987)
- 'Chambres d'amis', Stedelijk Museum voor Actuele Kunst (SMAK) in Ghent, Belgium (1986)
- Sonsbeek '86, International Sculpture Show, Arnhem (1986)
- 'Don't forget it', Stedelijk Museum voor Actuele Kunst (SMAK) in Ghent, Belgium (1984)
- 'Groene Wouden', Rijksmuseum Kröller-Müller, Otterlo (1983)

== Public space ==
- Nationaal Dachau Monument in the Amsterdamse Bos
- Rijksmonument Het Sieraad in Amsterdam
- Ruitenstraat in Dordrecht

== Corporate collections ==
- Schiphol Airport
- Achmea Kunstcollectie
- Kunstcollectie KPN
- TNT Post Kunstcollectie
- Academisch Ziekenhuis Maastricht
- Ministerie van Verkeer en Waterstaat, Maastricht

== See also ==
- Lijst van Nederlandse beeldhouwers
