= Robert Filliou =

French artist (1926–1987)

- Born: 17 January 1926; Sauve, France
- Died: 2 December 1987 (aged 61); Les Eyzies, France
- Occupation: Fluxus artist

Robert Filliou (17 January 1926 – 2 December 1987) was a French artist associated with Fluxus, who produced works as a filmmaker, action poet, sculptor, and happenings maestro.

== Life ==
In 1943, Filliou became a member of the French Communist Party. After the war in 1947, he travelled to the United States where he worked as a laborer for Coca-Cola in Los Angeles while gaining a master's degree in economics. In 1951, he took dual French-American nationality and worked as a United Nations adviser and was sent to Korea for three years where he met his first wife Joanna. In 1955, his son Bruce was born. He lived in Egypt, Spain, Denmark, Canada, and France. Filliou met his second wife, Marianne Staffels, in Denmark.

Filliou died on 2 December 1987 in a monastery in Les Eyzies, France.

== Career ==
In 1960, Filliou designed his first visual work, Le Collage de l'immortelle mort du monde (Collage of the Immortal Death of the World), a transcription of a random theater play comparable to a chessboard where individual experiences are expressed.

Filliou first proposed "Art's Birthday" in 1963. He suggested that 1,000,000 years ago, there was no art. But one day, on January 17 to be precise, Art was born. Filliou says it happened when someone dropped a dry sponge into a bucket of water. He also proposed a public holiday to celebrate the presence of art in our lives. Art's Birthday was first publicly celebrated in 1973 in Aachen (i.e., Aix-la-Chapelle), Germany and at the same time in Paris, France.

In 1971, Filliou created la République géniale (the Republic of Genius) where people enter its territory to develop their genius rather than their talent and research is no longer the privileged domain of the person who knows, but of the person who does not know.

In his work Le Petit Robert Filliou, Filliou defined the principles of Poetic Economics and its scale of values. This work served as the script for a Super 8 film that he made in 1972 with Bob Guiny.

In 1973 Robert Filliou performed with Jannis Kounellis, Wolf Vostell, Allan Kaprow, and Mario Merz in Berlin at the ADA - Aktionen der Avantgarde.

In 1974, Filliou produced Recherche sur l'origine, a work made of cloth 90 meters long and 3 meters high where spectators could walk around inside.

Video works by Filliou include: 14 Songs and 1 Riddle (1977, document of a performance), And So on, End So Soon: Done 3 times (1977), Porta Filliou (1977), Telepathic Music Nø7 - The Principle of Equivalence Carried to a Series of 5 (1977), Teaching and Learning as Performings Arts, Part 2, Video (1979). Filliou also produced video works at Vehicule in Montréal, and an obscure work done in the basement of the Pompidou. A large number of editions and multiples were as important to Filliou as the 'unique' works. In 1970 Filliou produced his 'multi-book' called Teaching and Learning as Performing Arts, it covers a great amount of the artist’s radical ideas on participatory art making and teaching.

Filliou worked together with artists such as Emmett Williams and George Brecht. In 1982, Filliou received the first Schwitters prize of the city of Hanover.

Among the many artists who cherished Robert Filliou's work was Maurizio Nannucci, who actually published him as editor and owner of an avant-garde publishing house.

In 1977, Filliou moved to Canada and continued to work with video. Later, with his wife Marianne Staffels, Filliou withdrew for 3 years 3 months and 3 days to a Buddhist center near Les Eyzies, France.

Underscoring Filliou's work is an interest in what defines and constitutes an artwork. A trained political scientist, Filliou was greatly inspired by the work of the feminist and utopian communist philosopher Charles Fourier, especially his concept of 'attractive passions' that championed the concept of work as pleasure. Play and joy occupy crucial roles for Filliou, who believed art making was part of a permanent, universal and endless process deeply embedded everyday life.

== Works ==
This is an incomplete list of video works that were produced in Canada (Arton's in Calgary and the Western Front in Vancouver)

- Porta Filliou (1977) (Arton's)
- 14 Songs and 1 Riddle (1977) (a performance at the Western Front with the Four Horsemen and other poets)
- And So on, End So Soon : Done 3 times (1977) (Western Front)
- Telepathic Music Nø7 - The Principle of Equivalence Carried to a Series of 5 (1977) (Western Front)
- Teaching and Learning as Performings Arts, Part 2, Video University (1979) (Western Front)
- Project for Sky-Writing (planche n°1)
