= Sayre Gomez =

American artist (born 1982)

- Born: 1982 (age 43–44); Chicago, Illinois, U.S.
- Education: California Institute of the Arts, School of the Art Institute of Chicago
- Known for: Artist, painting, sculpture, video

Sayre Gomez (born 1982) is a contemporary American artist who lives and works in Los Angeles.

== Early life and career ==
Sayre Gomez was born in Chicago, Illinois in 1982. He holds a BFA from the School of the Art Institute of Chicago and an MFA from the California Institute of the Arts.

== Work ==
Gomez works across mediums, including painting, sculpture, and video, to address themes of perception and representation. His works often deploy a range of painting techniques drawn omnivorously from Hollywood set painting, commercial sign painting, automotive airbrushing, and other traditions. The city of Los Angeles serves as a frequent setting and subject, given homage through references to roadside signage, car culture, fantastical sunsets, and other aspects of Angeleno visual culture. Recurring metaphors such as windows, doors, gates, and walls are often used in Gomez's work as part of an investigation into the role of context in the distribution and legibility of images in the 21st century.

== Exhibitions ==
Gomez has exhibited at major institutions including the MOCA LA, the Museum of Contemporary Art Chicago; Museum Tinguely, the Institute of Contemporary Art (Miami),Mumok, and Sifang Art Museum. Gomez has also exhibited at galleries including François Ghebaly, Los Angeles and Xavier Hufkens, Brussels. In 2023, he exhibited in a group exhibition at Gallery Common, Tokyo, curated by artist and musician Amadour that also featured Devendra Banhart. His solo show Precious Moments at David Kordansky Gallery in Los Angeles in 2026, displayed a more-than-eight-foot-tall scale model of downtown Los Angeles’s graffiti-covered Oceanwide Plaza towers.

== Publications ==
Sayre Gomez: Enterprise. Published in conjunction with the exhibition Enterprise at Sifang Art Museum, Nanjing from 10 November 2022 to 9 April 2023. Published by Xavier Hufkens, Brussels, 2023, 144 pages, softcover, English and Mandarin

Sayre Gomez: Halloween City. Published in conjunction with the exhibition: Sayre Gomez, Halloween City at Francois Ghebaly Gallery, 2022.

Sayre Gomez: WORLD. Edited by Galerie Nagel Draxler, with texts by Giampaolo Bianconi, CAWD, Maurin Dietrich, Rita Gonzalez. Verlag der Buchhandlung Walther und Franz König, 2021.

Sayre Gomez: Déjà Vu. Published in conjunction with the exhibition, Sayre Gomez, Déjà Vu, by Francois Ghebaly Gallery, 2018.
