= Guillaume Bijl =

Belgian artist (1946–2025)

Guillaume Bijl (19 March 1946 – 14 June 2025) was a Belgian conceptual and an installation artist. He lived and worked in Antwerp.

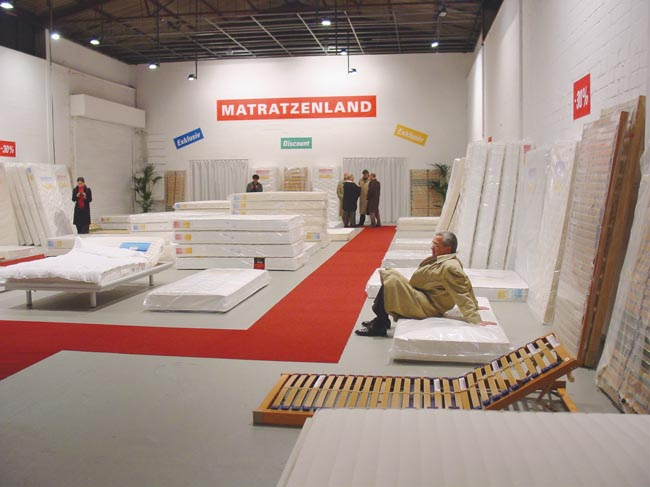
Mattressdiscount installation, 2002, Kunsthalle, Münster

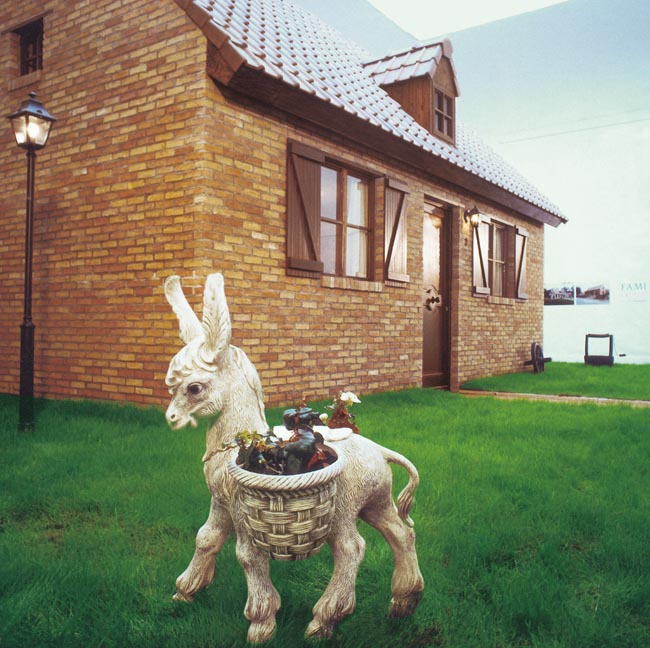
"Fami-Home" installation, 1988, Venice Biennale, Belgium Pavilion

== Background ==
Bijl was born in 1946 to a working-class family in Antwerp. The artist's father worked at the local docks and his mother worked for the Bell Telephone Company. A self-taught artist, Bijl came to art as an outsider initially making paintings during the 1960s. During this time, he mimicked numerous artistic movements such as Impressionism, Expressionism, Surrealism, abstract movements and more. During a period of self-guided studies in economics, Bijl worked at a bank in Brussels. Shortly thereafter his parents sent him to a local vocational trade school in the hopes of gaining professional skills. For nearly a decade, Bijl worked part-time in the art section of a bookstore in Antwerp. In the late 1960s, he studied theater and film at the Royal Institute for Theatre, Cinema, and Sound in Brussels before dropping out after only a year. Bijl only then devoted himself to art-making full-time in his mid-30s.

Bijl died on 14 June 2025, at the age of 79.

== Work ==
Bijl's early work, a series of projects on paper, combined his myriad background experiences and aimed to engage a wider audience citing a need to be nearer to the public. The series, Project-notities [Project Notes] (1969–1975), includes drawings and written proposals for museum installations, theatrical pieces, performance projects, and experiments in 16mm film. In the late 1970s Bijl began creating Transformation Installations, meticulous imitations of everyday realities inside the walls of galleries and museums. Bijl's first installation was a driving school, set in a gallery in Antwerp in 1979, accompanied by a manifesto calling for the abolition of art centres, and replacing them with 'socially useful institutions'. This installation was followed in the eighties by a billiards room, a casino, a laundromat, a centre for professional training, a psychiatric hospital, a fallout shelter, a show of fictitious American artists, a conference for a new political party and a rural Belgian model house. A more recent show was at the Berlin's Center for Opinions in Music and Art. Bijl has been reviewed by The New York Times. He divided his work into four categories: 'Transformation Installations', 'Situation Installations', 'Compositions Trouvées' and 'Sorrys'.

== Solo exhibitions ==
Bijl is represented by At the Gallery/modern and contemporary art (Antwerp), Galerie Nagel Draxler (Cologne/Berlin), Guy Pieters Gallery (Knokke-Heist, Belgium) and André Simoens Gallery (Knokke, Belgium). Below is a selection of Solo exhibitions:

- 2021: Royal Academy of Antwerp, Belgium
- 2018: Musée Félicien Rops, Namur, Belgium
- 2014: Art Cologne, Germany
- 2013: Centre d’art Contemporain, Montélimar
- 2012: Cultuurcentrum Mechelen
- 2012: Etablisssement d’en face, Brussels
- 2011: Arnolfini
- 2008: SMAK
- 2001: Städtische Galerie Nordhorn
- 1998: Kunsthalle Reklinghausen
- 1998: Neue Galerie Graz
- 1997: Musée d'art contemporain de Montréal
- 1996: Kunstverein Hannover
- 1996: Muhka
- 1994: Middelheim Open Air Sculpture Museum
- 1993: Wiener Secession
- 1990: Witte de With Center for Contemporary Art
- 1989: New Museum
- 1989: Le Magasin
- 1988: Venice Biennale, Belgium Pavilion
- 1988: Kunstverein Kassel
- 1986: Kunstverein Keulen
- 1985: Stedelijk Museum
- 1984: SMAK
- 1984: Art Basel
- 1979: Galerij Z, Antwerp

== Group exhibitions ==
Guillaume Bijl's work has been featured in significant groupshows and biennials, including the Documenta IX (1992), Skulptur Projekte Münster (2007), Busan Biennale (2006), Scape Biennale (2008), Lyon Biennale (2011), Istanbul Biennale (2013) and MANIFESTA 11 (2016).

== Public collections ==
Bijl's piece titled Behandlingen (1975–1979) resides in the collection at the Museum of Contemporary Art, Antwerp. The artist has work collected at Centre Pompidou and Musée Nationale d'Art Moderne in Paris, the Stedelijk Museum voor Actuele Kunst (S.M.A.K.) in Ghent, MUMOK in Vienna, the Goldberg Collection in New York, and more.
