= Action poetry =

Action poetry is a form of poetry that is fierce, unpredictable, and full of energy. It is meant to be read aloud with emphasis and feelings to exhibit the true emotions of the poems. This form of poetry can be found in murals, books, and poetic competitions or recitals such as poetry slam.

== Forms ==
=== Murals ===
Action poetry can be exhibited through murals. Whole poems or poem excerpts are painted on walls often with associating artworks. And example is The Art Alley Mural Project, which is a project by Arts Etobicoke that has painted a specially commissioned poem by the City of Toronto's Poet Laureate on a 1000 square foot wall in an alley in the city of Toronto. This mural is only one of a series of murals participating in the Urban Canvas project throughout Toronto, celebrating the 60th anniversary of the Universal Declaration of Human Rights.

=== Poetry slam ===
Poetry slam is another form of action poetry in which a competition is held where competitors would read or recite original works, while being judged by selected members of an audience.

=== Written form ===
Books that showcase different written works of action poetry are also available. One of these books is Action Poetry: Literary Tribes For The Internet Age by Levi Asher, Jamelah Earle, and Caryn Thurman.

Literary Kicks is a website dedicated to action poetry in which users would post original work. Users can comment on, respond to, or add to works posted:

"Once a bright eyed
young fool obsessed
with the sky,

Once a
punk kid,
with stars in
his eyes,

Now who is he?

The stars are fading
into sorrowful
lights that only see
the misery and woe
of the world
while the heart weeps."

So Much Gone
by: Poetpunk

== Quote ==
"All poetry is a call to action."
