= Alicia Framis =

Spanish artist

- Alicia Framis
- Born: Barcelona, Spain
- Education: Barcelona University (BFA), École nationale supérieure des Beaux-Arts (BFA), Institut d’Hautes Etudes (MFA), Rijksakademie van Beeldende Kunsten (MFA)
- Known for: relational aesthetics, performance art, social practice art
- Website: aliciaframis.com

Alicia Framis a Spanish-Dutch multidisciplinary artist who lives and works in Amsterdam, Netherlands. Her practice explores technology, intimacy, loneliness, gender, and new forms of coexistence. She develops platforms for creative social interaction, often through interdisciplinary collaboration with other artists and specialists across various fields. Her work is project based and focuses on different aspects of human existence within contemporary urban society. Framis often starts out from actual social dilemmas to develop novel settings and proposed solutions. Framis studied with the French minimalist artist Daniel Buren and the American conceptual artist Dan Graham and her work can be located within the lineages of relational aesthetics, performance art, and social practice art. She represented the Netherlands in the Dutch Pavilion at the 50th Venice Biennale (2003). She founded and directed an MA program at the Sandberg Instituut in Amsterdam, Netherlands and is a lecturer at Nebrija University in Madrid, Spain. In 2019, Alicia Framis was awarded with the Lucas Artists Visual Arts Fellowship 2019-2022 in California.

Framis's work has been presented widely at museums, galleries, and public spaces throughout the world. Her works are included in numerous permanent collections, including those of Hirshhorn Museum in Washington (US), Stedelijk Museum Amsterdam (Netherlands), MUSAC Castilla y Léon (Spain), Museum voor Moderne Kunst Arnhem (Netherlands), FRAC Lorraine (France), Ullens Center for Contemporary Art Beijing (China), El Museo del Barrio New York (US), Philadelphia Museum (US), Migros Museum für Gegenwartskunst (Switzerland), Museum Boijmans van Beuningen (Netherlands), The National Museum of Modern Art Kyoto (Japan), Rabo Art Collection (Netherlands), Sanders Collection (Netherlands), and VandenBroek Foundation (Netherlands), among others.

She represented the Netherlands for the Dutch Pavilion at the 50th Venice Biennale (2003), Moscow Biennale (2009), the 2nd Berlin Biennale (2001), Performa 09 New York, and Manifesta 2 Luxemburg (1998), and has appeared as one of Creative Time's public art projects in New York (2015). Most recently she has been invited to participate at the Bangkok Biennale (2022).

== Early life and education ==
Alicia Framis received her first BFA from Barcelona University and a second from the École nationale supérieure des Beaux-Arts in Paris. She has also received two MFA degrees: one from Institut d’Hautes Etudes, Paris and another from Rijksakademie van beeldende Kunsten, Amsterdam. Framis has taught architecture at Delft University of Technology, and fine art at both Sandberg Instituut and ArtEZ Institute of the Arts.

== Work ==
=== The Hybrid Couple ===
Framis became the first woman to marry an AI hologram on 9 November 2024 in a ceremony at the Depot of Museum Boijmans Van Beuningen in Rotterdam, attended by around 300 people. The Hybrid Couple is her ongoing life and art project centered on her relationship with Ailex Sibouwlingen, an AI hologram and metahuman whom she presents as her husband and artistic collaborator. The art project extends her long-standing interest in care, companionship and urban loneliness, by investigating the practical and ethical dimensions of human–AI relationships, asking whether artificial intelligence, holograms, avatars and robots can become companions and help people have new forms of love, care and emotional presence while having the potential to support people with disabilities, trauma, or other challenges. Framis has described The Hybrid Couple as a continuation of her work about technology and care, emotion, and loneliness.

=== Social architecture ===
Key social projects include Loneliness in the City (1999-2000), which travelled to six different international cities and invited artists, architects, designers, and the general public to a portable pavilion where the aim of inventing strategies against the epidemic of urban loneliness was explored, Welcome to Guantanamo Museum (2008), a multifaceted project involving drawings, scale models, and floor plans of a proposed memorial for the infamous U.S. detention camp, and Billboardhouse (2000-2009), an open-side cube made of three billboards that costs almost nothing to make and serves as a shelter for homeless individuals.

=== Fashion and demonstrations ===
In 2003 Framis released her project anti_dog, a collection of designs made with a special fabric, Twaron, that is fire-, bullet-, and dog bite-proof. The anti_dog collection protects women against aggressive behaviour and was inspired by stories of dark complexioned women having attack dogs released at them during the night in Berlin neighborhoods populated by white supremacists.

Her project Not For Sale (2008) uses photos of children with the intention of raising awareness of child slavery worldwide.

For 100 Ways to Wear a Flag (2007-2008), Framis invited sixteen designers to produce a garment inspired by the Chinese flag. This highlighted the explosion of the garment export industry in modern China, while also questioning how the associations of nationhood could both empower and burden the wearer.

Continuing with her decades-long exploration of topics that deal with gender inequality, Framis presented two new demonstrations in 2018. Lifedress employs elements of technology, activism and performance, while addressing sexual harassment and violence towards women. The work consists of dresses made out of airbag fabric from cars: a high tech material made in Japan with a high resistance to impacts and fire. Each dress is made to protect against a different form of (sexual) harassment, and designed to change form when intimidation occurs. The work can be seen as a social comment on gender patterns in our society nowadays, and aims to discuss a serious topic through a surrealistic act. For the work Is My Body Public? Framis uses garments to explore the borders of that which is private and that which is public, and wishes to focus attention on the issue of women's control over their own bodies. Each of the 16 dresses is embroidered with the sentence "Is My Body Public?" in 16 different languages. While the aesthetics of the dresses resemble that of lingerie, a material usually associated with the private realm, with moments of intimacy inside the home environment, they are at the same time used actively in performance demonstrations, where the viewer is confronted with the women's message and asked to reflect upon this.

=== Wishing ===
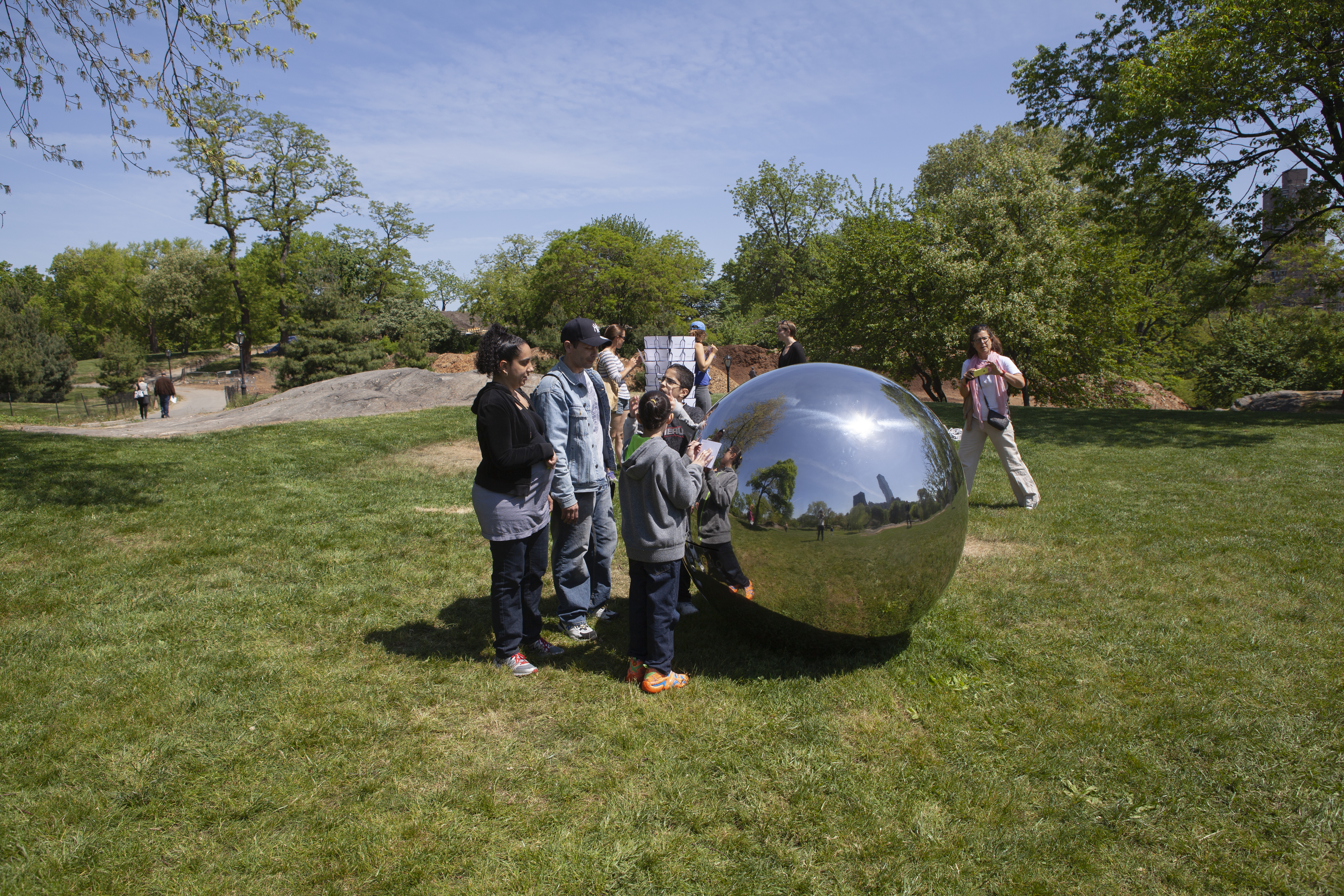
Cartas al Cielo by Alicia Framis, in Central Park New York during “Drifting in Daylight” organized by Creative Time, May 2015

The belief that humans can achieve a more fulfilling future is a key component of Framis's work, and is shown through projects that deal with the delicate act of wishing. Her piece Wishing Wall (1998-2001) traveled around Netherlands, Italy, Switzerland, and Germany, and collected a total of 1,563 wishes. The first Wishing Wall was made for the Serre di Rapolano, Italy. Framis decided to make holes in the wall because the building was from the Mussolini era and the townspeople were slightly ashamed of it. The act of making holes in the wall became a performance for Framis, and these holes were later filled in with rolled up wishes that visitors had written on slips of paper in invisible ink. This interactive piece was later shown by Jan Hoet and Nicolas Bourriaud, the curator recognized as coining the term "relational aesthetics."

Framis's sculpture Cartas al Cielo (2012), a stainless steel sphere 5 feet in diameter, was created to act as a postbox where one can send letters to the members of our lives who are no longer physically with us. The word "cielo" has a double meaning in the artist's original language of Spanish: it can mean both "sky" and "heaven." Cartas al Cielo is an interactive work where visitors may pen letters to anyone who now lacks an earthbound address. This poetic gesture lets people focus on their desires, dreams, and the immaterial word that coincides with our physical, human one.

=== Notable projects ===
Framis's most notable projects include anti_dog (2002–2003), Walking Monument (1997), Loneliness in the City (1999–2000), Lost Astronaut (2010), Dreamkeeper (1997), Walking Ceiling (2018), Forbidden Books (2017), and Secret Strike Rabobank (2004).

== Exhibitions ==
Framis's notable solo exhibitions include at presentations at Sala Alcalá 31, Madrid (2018), Stedelijk Museum Amsterdam (2017), MUSAC, Castilla y Léon (2014), Museum voor Moderne Kunst Arnhem (2013), La Frac Haute-Normandie, Rouen (2012), Ullens Center for Contemporary Art, Beijing (2010), Centre Pompidou, Paris (2010), El Museo del Barrio, New York (2004) and Palais de Tokyo, Paris (2002), among others.

== Recognition ==
=== Prizes and awards ===
In 1997, Framis won the prestigious Prix de Rome award for Art in Public Space; her piece “Walking Monument,” exhibited in Dam Square, Amsterdam was awarded first prize. In 2000, Framis won Prix Lleida Contemporary Art in Spain. In 2011 her piece Screaming Room was awarded Best Practice by Het Nieuwe Instituut, Rotterdam.

=== Galleries ===
Framis is represented by Barbara Gross Galerie in Munich, Germany, Galeria Juana de Aizpuru in Madrid, Spain and Upstream Gallery in Amsterdam, the Netherlands. She has formerly been represented by Galerie Micheline Szwajcer in Brussels, Belgium, among others.
