= Jan Van Imschoot =

Jan Van Imschoot (born 1963) is a Belgian contemporary artist whose works are collected by various international museums.

He is represented by major galleries including Galerie Daniel Templon in Paris and Brussels, Switzerland and Los Angeles.

He is a laureate of several awards in contemporary art. He studied at the Stedelijk Secundair Kunstinstituut Gent (Municipal Secondary Art Institute of Ghent) and the Koninklijke Academie voor Schone Kunsten (Royal Academy of Fine Arts). He significantly contributed to the discovery of the now very popular Flemish painter Michaël Borremans.
