= Edwin Zwakman =

Dutch visual artist & photographer (born 1969)

Edwin Zwakman (born 18 October 1969, The Hague) is a visual artist from the Netherlands whose works explore the interaction between reality and photography. He does this with staged photography, either in his studio or in public space. Works in the studio include a long-running series of pictures showing scale models of Dutch landscapes and interiors. And this landscape is itself a construct. By reconstructing it from memory, the artist reflects on the mentality of its makers and the way their world is represented in images. Works in public space concern themselves with iconic images from sites and events, often using fictitious United Nation operations to illustrate the workings of images in the media.

Edwin Zwakman studied in Rotterdam, Amsterdam and Frankfurt and exhibited in the Stedelijk Museum, Amsterdam, the European Museum for Photography, Paris, the Museum of Modern Art Kyoto, Taipei/Venice Biennials, as well as in London, Luzern, Vienna, Moscow, São Paulo, Budapest, Porto, San Sebastian, Jerusalem, Brussels, San Francisco and New York among others. He has had solo exhibitions in the Van Abbe Museum, Eindhoven, the Huis Marseille Museum for Photography, Amsterdam, and Ludwig Forum, Germany. He currently has a fellowship at the University of Derby, UK, where he also teaches photography.

== Monographs ==
Dennis Adams, Edwin Zwakman, New York City (Spencer Brownstone Gallery) 1997

Jan Debbaut, Kate Bush, Jaap Guldemond, Façades. Rotterdam (Stedelijk Van Abbemuseum/NAi Publishers) 1999

Liesbeth Melis, Jessica Powis, Marianne Brouwer, Tom van Gestel, Het Gat. Een kunstwerk van Edwin Zwakman. Amsterdam (SKOR) 2005
