= Luc Deleu =

Belgian architect, urbanist and artist

Luc Deleu is a Belgian architect, urbanist and artist born in 1944 in Duffel.

== Career ==
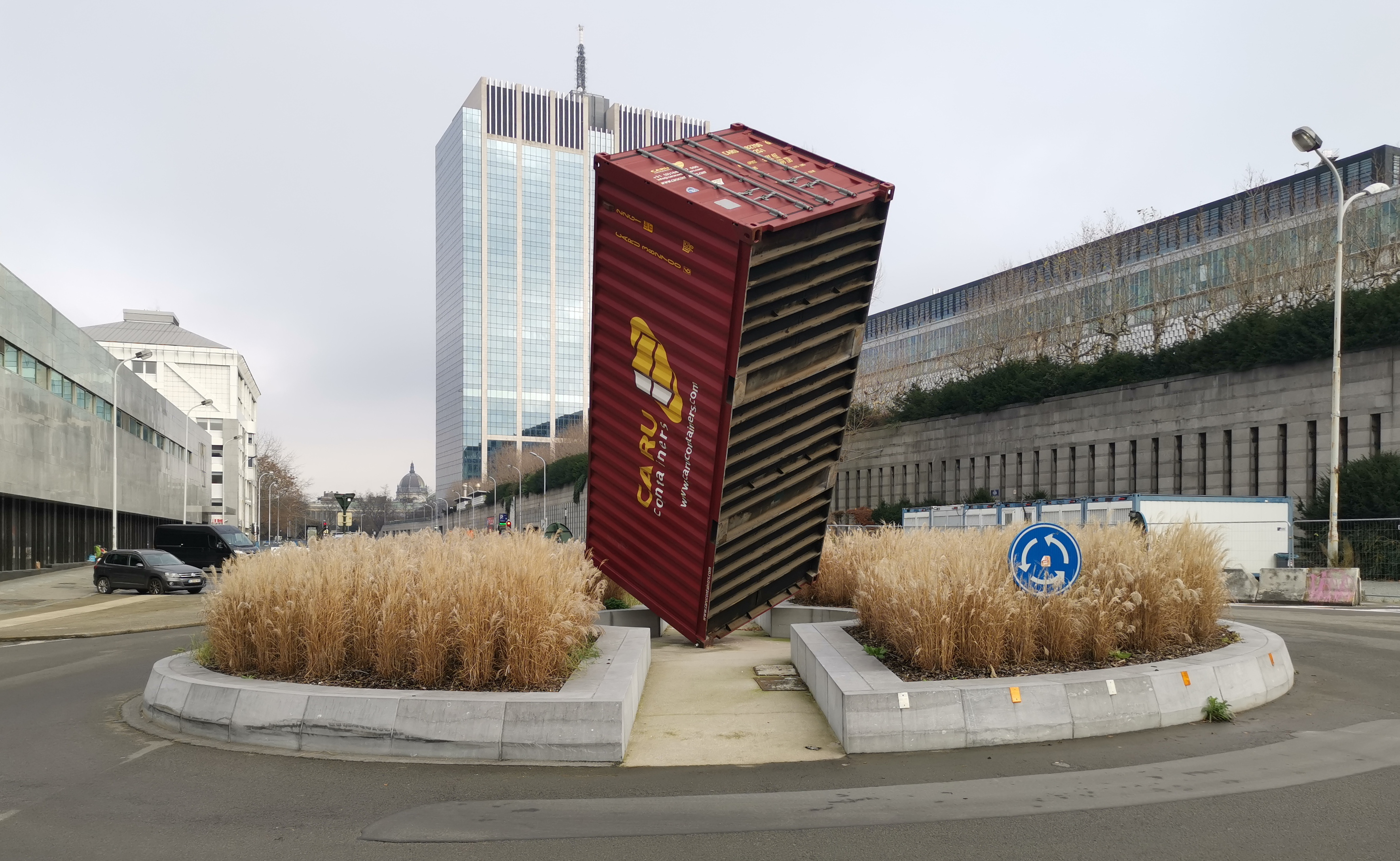
"The Container" artwork in Brussels

Luc Deleu is a Belgian architect and urban planner residing in Antwerp. In 1969, he completed his architectural degree, creating T.O.P. office in 1970 to question the role of architecture and urbanism in the modern age. His utopian projects put emphasis on mobility instead of the immobility of real estate, focusing on using urban space in a more efficient and intensive manner. In 1980, he created the Orban Planning Manifesto, which for the first time, places emphasis on the responsibilities of architecture and building on a global scale.

Notable projects include: Proposal to use existing rockets to fire (nuclear) waste at the sun (1975), School of Perspective and the Station Europa Centraal (1988-1989), VIP City (1999-2004). In 2006, a new work called Urban Space insists on increasing population density without trying to define functions. From 1999 to 2002, the Petuel tunnel in Munich was equipped with extraction units. Deleu presented a steel chimney as a multifunctional structure (antenna installations).

Since 2000, the work of Luc Deleu is more and more exhibited in contemporary art context.
