= Moshekwa Langa =

South African contemporary artist

- Born: 1975 (age 50–51); Bakenberg, South Africa
- Education: Rijksakademie van Beeldende Kunsten
- Occupation: Visual arrtist

Moshekwa Langa (born 1975) is a South African visual artist whose work includes painting, drawing, sculpture, performance, video, and photography.

== Biography ==
Moshekwa Langa was born in Bakenburg, Limpopo, South Africa in 1975. He began studying art history around the age of 15, which made him want to become an artist. Some time after high school, he came to view making art as an opportunity to become part of an "ongoing story." He studied at the Rijksakademie van Beeldende Kunsten (the State Academy of Fine Arts) in Amsterdam. As of 2021, Langa was based in Amsterdam and had work on permanent exhibition at MoMA, The Art Institute of Chicago, and the Tate Modern, among others.

== Career ==
Langa has said about his work, "If I had to explain what I do to someone, I would say I make kind of dreamscapes…I try to record aspects of waking and sleeping time." One critic said his work "has interrogated land and public and personal politics through the mapping of territory and cultural environments." Langa's work has also been described as "poetic" and deals with a variety of psychological themes, such as the "elusiveness of meaning." Langa's extensive practice is frequently philosophical in nature, and he has stated belonging, longing, desire, and separation as some themes he has explored.

Langa's 1995 installation ("empty, ripped-open, creosote-smeared detergent bags hung on a line like flayed skins") was shown again in 2003 at Brandeis' Rose Gallery and was noted for the interest it caused in Johannesburg and Europe surrounding its undefined meanings. Langa works largely with abstraction and frequently with language/writings and collage. Other notable projects include his November-December 2021 multi-media installation titled The Sweets of Sin, at Andrew Kreps in Tribeca, which featured paintings, as well as (on the floor of the gallery) a scramble of de-contextualized, yet familiar objects of leisure or waiting, such as records, burnt logs, and coffee table books. He also recently had a residency at the Cite Internationale des Arts in Paris. During the 1990's he was frequently shown around the world in what is now described as the golden age of biennales.

== Exhibitions ==
=== Solo exhibitions ===
- 2013: Counterpoints, Krannert Art Museum, University of Illinois, Champaign, Illinois
- 2017: Fugitive, Stevenson Gallery, Johannesburg, South Africa
- 2018: Relatives, Blain Southern Gallery, London
- 2019: Tropic of Capricorn, Stevenson Gallery, Cape Town, South Africa

=== Group exhibitions ===
- 1999: Generation Z, Museum of Modern Art, New York City
- 2002: The Short Century: Independence and Liberation Movements in Africa, 1945–1994, Museum of Modern Art, New York City
- 2003: How Latitudes Become Forms: Art in a Global Age, Walker Art Center, Minneapolis, Minnesota
- 2011: Impressions from South Africa, 1965 to Now, Museum of Modern Art, New York City
