= René Daniëls =

Dutch artist (born 1950)

René Daniëls (sometimes written as René Daniels) (born 23 May 1950 in Eindhoven) is a Dutch artist.

Daniels is considered one of the most eminent Dutch painters of his generation. In his work he links art and its rich history to literature and everyday life, following in the footsteps of, amongst others, Marcel Duchamp and René Magritte. Ambiguity and double meanings play an important role in what he calls "visual poetry".

He has exhibited regularly at home and abroad, until in 1987 at the age of 37, he was affected by a brain haemorrhage. All materials in his studio were housed in the Stichting René Daniëls and documented and preserved by the Van Abbemuseum. Since 2006, Daniels lives in his native city of Eindhoven and began to paint and draw again.

== Biography ==
=== Education ===
- 1972–1976 Koninklijke Akademie voor Kunst en Vormgeving, ’s-Hertogenbosch

=== Lectureships ===
- 1980 AKI, Enschede
- 1982–1986 Academie voor Beeldende Vorming, Tilburg
- 1983–1987 Ateliers '63, Haarlem
- 1987 Jan van Eyck Academie, Maastricht

=== Prizes ===
- 1988 Sandbergprijs voor Schilderkunst
- 1998 Commissarispenning, Provincie Noord-Brabant 1992 David Roëll Prijs
- 2007 Oeuvreprijs Fonds BKVB

== Exhibitions ==
=== Solo and duo exhibitions ===
- 1977 Hans Biezen/René Daniëls. Fotos und Zeichnungen, Stadt-Sparkasse, Düsseldorf.
- 1978 René Daniëls schilderijen, Joop Stolk grafiek, Galerie Helen van der Meij, Amsterdam.
- 1978 René Daniëls. Schilderijen, gouaches en tekeningen, Stedelijk Van Abbemuseum, Eindhoven.
- 1979 René Daniëls. Schilderijen en aquarellen, Galerie Helen van der Meij, Amsterdam
- 1981 Werk van René Daniëls en werk van Lili Dujouri, Vereniging Aktuele Kunst: Gewad, Ghent
- 1982 René Daniëls, John van ’t Slot', '121' Art Gallery, Antwerp
- 1982 René Daniëls. ’Nieuw werk', Galerie Helen van der Meij, Amsterdam
- 1983 René Daniëls. Schilderijen, Galerie Helen van der Meij/Paul Andriesse, Amsterdam
- 1983 Daniëls/Dieleman. Tekeningen, Stedelijk Museum Amsterdam
- 1984 Een zaal boven de Pacific, Kunstcentrum Marktzeventien, Enschede
- 1984 René Daniëls. Schilderijen, Galerie Paul Andriesse, Amsterdam
- 1984 Meanwhile, Metro Pictures, New York
- 1985 Acht schilderijen over ondergronds verzet, Galerie Paul Andriesse, Amsterdam
- 1985 Innodiging voor Mooie Tentoonstellingen/Trio Eenzaamheid, Galerie Paul Andriesse, Amsterdam
- 1985 René Daniëls, Metro Pictures, New York
- 1986 René Daniëls, Galerie Joost Declerq, Ghent
- 1986 René Daniëls, Produzentengalerie, Hamburg
- 1986 René Daniëls. Schilderijen en tekeningen 1976–1986, Stedelijk Van Abbemuseum, Eindhoven
- 1987 René Daniëls. Kades-Kaden, Kunsthalle Bern
- 1987 René Daniëls. A’dam E’ven, Galerie Paul Andriesse, Amsterdam
- 1987 René Daniëls, Galerie Rudolf Zwirner, Keulen
- 1990 René Daniëls. Lentebloesem, Maison de la culture et de la communication, Saint-Etienne; Museum Boymans-van Beuningen, Rotterdam
- 1992 Kleine presentatie René Daniëls, Stedelijk Van Abbemuseum, Eindhoven
- 1993 René Daniëls, The Arts Club of Chicago, Chicago
- 1993 René Daniëls, Raum Aktueller Kunst, Wenen
- 1993 De Aankoop I. René Daniëls, Bonnefantenmuseum, Maastricht
- 1993 René Daniëls/Shirley Wiitasalo, Art Gallery of York University, Toronto, Ontario; Illingworth Kerr Gallery, Alberta College of Art, Calgary, Alberta; Mackenzie Art Gallery, Regina, Saskatchewan
- 1994 René Daniëls, Institut Néerlandais, Paris
- 1994 René Daniëls/Shirley Wiitasalo, Museum Haus Lange, Krefeld
- 1995 René Daniëls, Stedelijk Van Abbemuseum, Eindhoven
- 1998 René Daniëls. The Most Contemporary Picture Show, Stedelijk Van Abbemuseum, Eindhoven; Kunstmuseum Wolfsburg, Wolfsburg; Kunsthalle Basel, Basel
- 1999 René Daniëls, Stedelijk Museum Amsterdam
- 1999 René Daniëls. The Most Contemporary Picture Show, Museu Serralves – Museu de Arte Contemporânea, Porto
- 2000 René Daniëls: Paintings and Drawings, 22 April 2000 – 3 June 2000, Metro Pictures, New York. The show features works from the late 1970s through the 1980s which are on loan from the René Daniëls Foundation and various European museums.
- 2004 Nederland Niet Nederland, Van Abbemuseum, Eindhoven
- 2006 René Daniëls, Domaine de Kerguéhennec – Centre d’Art Contemporain, Bignan
- 2006 René Daniëls, Bonnefantenmuseum, Maastricht
- 2007 René Daniëls. Tekeningen en schilderijen 1977–1987, Stichting De Pont, Tilburg
- 2010 René Daniëls: Paintings on Unknown Languages, 23 September 2010 – 28 November 2010, Camden Arts Centre, London. This exhibition brings together a significant number of paintings and drawings by the Dutch artist René Daniëls, focusing on his work between 1980 and 1987.
- 2011-2012 René Daniëls. An exhibition is always part of a greater whole, Palacio de Velázquez, Parque del Retiro, October 20, 2011 – March 26, 2012. Organized by Museo Reina Sofía and Van Abbemuseum Eindhoven. The show presents a broad selection of works dated from the 1970s to 1987: paintings, graphics, some of his earliest pieces, characterised by their expressionist brushstrokes, and the arboreal cartographies and diagrams of his Lentebloesem series. Furthermore, the exhibition also includes various materials and documents (notebooks, sketches, annotations from the artist's archives.
- 2012 René Daniëls – Een tentoonstelling is ook altijd een deel van een groter geheel, 12 May 2012 – 23 September 2012, Van Abbemuseum Eindhoven. Organized by Museo Reina Sofía and Van Abbemuseum Eindhoven (see below).
- 2018 René Daniëls: Fragmenten uit een onvoltooide roman, 7 September 2018 – 6 January 2019, Wiels Brussels. Organized by Wiels and MAMCO, Genève.

== Collections ==
- Van Abbemuseum in Eindhoven (overview of works)
- De Pont Museum of Contemporary Art in Tilburg (overview of works)
- Bonnefantenmuseum in Maastricht
- Kunstmuseum Wolfsburg in Wolfsburg
- Tate Gallery in London
- Gemeentemuseum Helmond (overview of works)

== Descriptions of individual works ==
=== Paintings ===
Mexikaan (Mexican, 1977)

- Bilske, Maria and Sanger, Alice (May 2006 / October 2008). Mexican. Tate, London.

==== Hollandse Nieuwe (New Dutch Herring, 1982) ====
- Bilske, Maria and Sanger, Alice (May 2006 / October 2008). New Dutch Herring. Tate, London.

Terugkeer van de performance (Return of the performance, 1987)

- René Daniëls. Return of the performance. Description accompanying the small exhibition Plug In #31, Van Abbemuseum, Eindhoven.
