= Thierry De Cordier =

Belgian-Spanish visual artist

Thierry De Cordier (born 1954) is a Belgian contemporary visual artist.

His work includes drawing, painting, sculpture, installation and poetry; examples are held in the Stedelijk Museum voor Actuele Kunst, the Centre Georges Pompidou and the Hirshhorn Museum and Sculpture Garden.
