= Arts Etobicoke =

Non-profit arts council in Toronto, Ontario, Canada

- Formation: 1973
- Type: not-for-profit arts council
- Location(s): 4893A Dundas Street West; Toronto, Ontario; M9A 1B2
- Website: artsetobicoke.com

Arts Etobicoke was founded in 1973 in Toronto, Ontario, Canada (formerly in the city of Etobicoke). They are an incorporated not-for-profit arts council governed by a volunteer Board of Directors from business, the arts and the community. They serve thousands of students in their arts education programs, a membership of 50 arts organizations, 200 individual members, 60 individual artists and clients in an Art Rental program, hundreds of artists through their arts programming and exhibitions, 22 scholarship recipients, the general public and numerous project partners.

== About ==
Arts Etobicoke endeavors to engage the people of Etobicoke with the arts and artists in their own community. They provide programs and services to increase accessibility of the arts, involve diverse audiences, create broad awareness of artists through advocacy and develop partnerships to sustain local arts activities. To achieve this goal, they provide programs and services designed to increase the accessibility of the arts for residents of Etobicoke, reach and involve special and diverse audiences, create broad community awareness of local arts organizations and artists and develop partnerships and networks to foster and sustain local arts activities.

Operating funding for Arts Etobicoke comes from the City of Toronto and the Ontario Arts Council. This funding accounts for approximately 25% of their total income. The balance is raised through program revenues, memberships, foundations, corporate sponsorships, donations and fundraising events. Arts Etobicoke relies on a team of dedicated volunteers to promote events, help with fundraising, and assist with programs. Their current executive director is Menon Dwarka.

=== Programs ===
==== Smart StART Student Art Show ====
The "Smart Start Student Art Show" at Sherway Gardens is a non-juried art show displaying works of students from Grades 9 to 12 from the Toronto District School Board and Toronto District Catholic School Board. The Smart Start Student Art Show gives them an opportunity to present their artwork in a public forum, particularly in a high-traffic venue such as Sherway Gardens, where thousands of people can view their works. The program was established in 1996.

==== Urban Noise ====
A joint venture with Expect Theatre creates a platform for children/youth to speak out against violence in their communities. Established in 2006, the project includes a free Youth Training Program and Festival that promotes leadership, unity and social change in the culturally diverse communities of Rexdale/Jamestown, located in North Etobicoke. The workshops include DJing, break dancing, singing and song writing, etc. These workshops encourage youth to identify and examine the issues that directly affect them in a supportive environment through various artistic mediums. It also solicits the attention of the general public to take notice of the neighbourhoods that are suffering from racial tension, poverty, gender inequality and lack of resources - all of which can become a potential source for violence.

==== Art Alley ====
Art Alley is a project that was designed to bring poetry to Islington Village. A specially commissioned poem by Dionne Brand (City of Toronto's Poet Laureate) has been painted on the 1000-square-foot wall in the alley immediately east of their storefront office.

==== Art on The Move ====
is a three-year mobile community arts initiative in partnership with Lakeshore Arts. The project will transform 13 vehicles into moving canvasses of art.

=== Scholarships ===
The Presidents' Legacy Scholarship Fund, launched in 1999, was established as an endowment fund with the Ontario Arts Foundation to provide financial assistance to young people from West Toronto wishing to pursue their education in the arts. Scholarships are awarded to students attending designated arts education institutions. As of 2011, approximately 75 young people received scholarships and awards from the program to such institutions as; OCAD; Royal Conservatory of Music; Kingsway Conservatory of Music; Humber College; Etobicoke School of the Arts; North Albion C.I.; Sean Boutillier Academy of Dance; and Richview C.I.
