= Jan Vercruysse =

Belgian contemporary visual artist (1948–2018)

- Born: October 3, 1948; Ostend, Belgium
- Died: February 27, 2018 (aged 69); Bruges, Belgium
- Occupation: Artist
- Years active: 1974–2018
- Parents: Irène De Ketelaere; Pierre Marie Joseph Vercruysse

Jan Vercruysse (3 October 1948 – 27 February 2018) was a Belgian contemporary visual artist, sculptor and photographer.

== Life and work ==
Vercruysse was born in Ostend and died in Bruges, both Flemish municipalities in Belgium. Prior to becoming a visual artist and photographer in 1974, Vercruysse studied law and had been a poet.

As a sculptor, his work featured industrial materials such as corten steel, bronze, iron and glass.

He has also previously lived and worked in Italy and Spain. Vercruysse represented his country Belgium at the Venice Biennale in 1993, where he exhibited a selection of his work.

Vercruysse's work is part of many important European and American museum collections and is referred to as one of Belgium's most influential artists. He is represented by Xavier Hufkens Gallery in Brussels as well as Vistamare and Tucci Russo in Italy.

== Awards and recognition ==
Flemish Culture Prize for the Visual Arts (2001)

== Museum exhibitions ==
A selection of exhibitions of work produced by Vercruysse include:

- Works 1975-2009, M - Museum Leuven, Belgium (2009)
- Salto Prolungato, Museum Dhondt-Dhaenens, Deurle, Belgium (2001)
- Portretten van de Kunstenaar – Portraits de l’Artiste, Centre for Fine Arts, Brussels, Belgium (1999)
- Portretten van de Kunstenaar – Portraits of the Artist, Van Abbemuseum, Eindhoven, Netherlands (1998)
- The Villas, Haus Lange – Haus Esters, Krefelder Museen, Krefeld, Germany (1995)
- The Power Plant, Toronto, Ontario, Canada (1993)
- Padiglione di Belgio, Venice Biennale, Venice, Italy (1993)
- Tombeaux, Museo d’Arte Contemporanea, Castle of Rivoli, Rivoli, Italy (1992)
- Van Abbemuseum, Eindhoven, Netherlands (1992)
- Kunsthalle Bern, Bern, Switzerland (1989)
- Palais des Beaux-Arts de Lille, Brussels, Belgium (1988)
- ARC, City of Paris Museum of Modern Art, Paris, France (1986)
