= Walter Swennen =

Belgian painter (1946–2025)

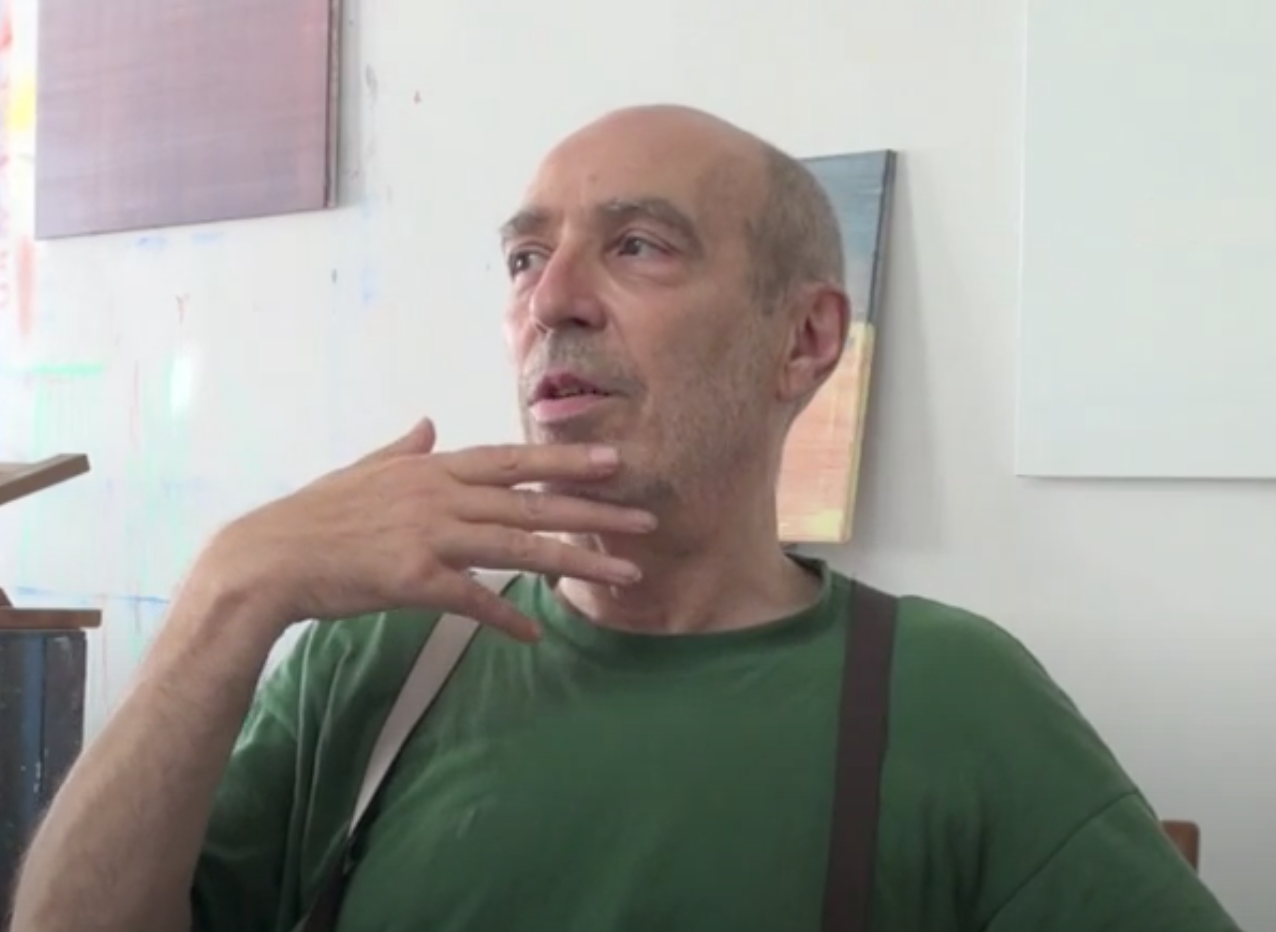
- Born: 27 February 1946; Brussels, Belgium
- Died: 14 August 2025 (aged 79)
- Known for: Artist

Walter Swennen (27 February 1946 – 14 August 2025) was a Belgian visual artist who lived and worked in Brussels.

== Work ==
Originally trained as a printmaker, Swennen's early career revolved around poetry, philosophy, and artistic happenings. In the early 1980s, he shifted to painting as his primary means of expression.

Swennen explored and challenged the associative qualities of language, legibility, subjectivity and symbolic meaning, giving his work a personal semiotic quality. Central to his practice was his belief in the total autonomy of the artwork. His work can be construed as having been an ongoing exploration into the nature and problems of painting (its potential and limitations), the fundamental question of what to paint (subject matter), and how (technique). Swennen saw each canvas as an exercise in painting, a place where 'the artist simultaneously moves, thinks, and acts'. His works are akin to thought processes given material form.

He created without one signature style, and employed his background in philosophy, poetry, and psychoanalysis to render his works. His paintings are devoid of frameworks and perspectival elements, uncoupled from reality and conventional associations. To Swennen, painting was both object and subject: a material entity unto itself in which the 'how' determines the 'what'. His paintings are not necessarily 'about' anything, but if his paintings had a meaning, it would be, in the words of the writer Hans Theys, 'in a material sense, not in the form of a code that needs to be deciphered.'

== Life and career ==
=== Early years and education ===
Swennen was born in Forest, Brussels on 27 February 1946, the second of six children.

Swennen started painting classes at the age of fourteen while attending the Saint-Louis College in Brussels. After high school, he enrolled as a philosophy student at the Saint-Louis University, Brussels but quit after one year and moved on to the engraving department of the Académie Royale des Beaux-Arts. In 1967, he became a candidate in Psychology at the Université catholique de Louvain (UCL). Swennen received his degree in Psychology in 1973.

=== Poetry and happenings ===
Swennen began writing poetry and giving live readings around 1965, after his having discovered of the poetry of the Beat Generation. He befriended Marcel Broodthaers, who organised artistic happenings and to whom Swennen dedicated the poem "Ballade Pop" (1965). Reading Tristan Tzara's 'Dada Manifesto' prompted Swennen into a three-year period of ephemeral actions and collaborations: he participated in Au pied de la lettre, a happening centered on the pitfalls of poetic communication, organised and hosted by Broodthaers.

While studying Psychology at the Université Catholique de Louvain, Swennen organised several politically charged happenings off-campus, and also formed the short-lived Groupe Accuse. In 1977, he became a professor of Psychoanalysis at the École de Recherche Graphique (ERG).

=== Painting ===
Swennen shifted to painting in the early 1980s. In 1981, he was selected for the national award show for young painters at the Centre for Fine Arts, Brussels. That same year, Gallery Patrick Verelst gave him his first solo exhibition, followed in 1982 by two group shows focused on contemporary painting in Belgium: La Magie de l’image/De Magie van het beeld, at the Centre for Fine Arts, Brussels, and Le Désir pictural/Het Picturaal verlangen, at Galerie Isy Brachot in Brussels. The work Swennen exhibited combined action painting with a simplified multiplicity of languages, which embraced chance when choosing subject matter.

In 1984, Swennen moved to Antwerp and the following years are marked by a number of exhibitions: a gallery exhibition at Micheline Szwajcer (1984); the Vereniging voor het Museum van Hedendaagse Kunst, Ghent (1984) and his first solo presentation at a public institution, the Centre for Fine Arts, Brussels (1986). Over the course of the following five years, The Flemish Community actively started to acquire his work.

When Swennen was 40, he wrote '... succeed in painting whatever; that is the ideal. (…) The key: premeditation is always an aggravating circumstance.' This idea comes from the psychoanalyst Jacques Lacan, who replaced Freud's 'ground-rule', whereby patients were requested to share with their analyst 'whatever they thought of', with an invitation 'to say anything, without fear of stupidity'. Swennen makes paintings that remain 'unimaginable' until they actually exist. This idea provided him with a way of creating work that was wholly conceived from the point of view of the maker (as opposed to that of the spectator), freed from the so-called necessity to express, share or demonstrate something.

In 1988, the Vlaamse Radio- en Televisieomroeporganisatie produced a documentary on Swennen, directed by Karel Schoetens. At 45 years old, Swennen was the only painter among a younger generation of artists to be selected for the group show Artisti (della Fiandra)/ Artists (from Flanders) (1990) organised at the Palazzo Sagredo in the off-programme of the 44th Venice Biennale.

In 1990, Swennen explained to MuHKA's director Bart De Baere that he had been struggling with the concepts of figuration and abstraction for some time, but had reached the conclusion that it was a false problem 'because a painting is always an image of a painting. No matter what it depicts, it is always about a painting.'

That same year, Swennen received his second solo exhibition in a public institution at the Palais des Beaux-Arts de Charleroi (1991), curated by Laurent Busine. Reviews summarised his work as "post-Pop art" and credited his timely impulse to simplify painting with an occasional and all-over gridded structure, either painted or ready-made.

Gallery shows followed at Nicole Klagsbrun Gallery, New York (1992); Galerie Micheline Szwajcer (1995); and Galerie Nadja Vilenne (1996); as well as Swennen's first retrospective at the MuHKA, Antwerp (1994). This was the first solo exhibition dedicated to a painter since the museum opened in 1987. In 2003, the Flemish Community awarded Swennen the annual artist prize.

For La Belgique visionnaire/Visionair België – C'est arrivé près de chez nous (2005) at the Centre for Fine Arts, Brussels, curated by Harald Szeemann before he died, Swennen contributed a painting depicting a skull and a funnel— the conventional headpiece of a fool—is integrated into an almost self-deprecating narrative which alludes to Belgium's distinctly split personality.

Swennen started a collaboration with Nicolas Krupp gallery in Basel in 2006 and was awarded the prize for the best national exhibition by the Brussels Foundation for the Arts for his solo show at Galerie Nadja Vilenne in Liège (2007). A string of gallery exhibitions took place, followed by the solo exhibition How to Paint a Horse, at De Garage, Mechelen and CC Strombeek, Grimbergen. It was not a retrospective, but a wide-ranging selection of paintings, accompanied by a publication with an extensive list of his paintings made to date.

Swennen's second solo show (2009) at Nicolas Krupp's gallery elicited attention from the international art press, and raised the question of why Swennen's work had not yet received international attention, especially given that, in hindsight, "his untailored style of neo-Expressionism seems closer to the New York artists of that time than that to their European counterparts." (Quinn Latimer)

=== Later years ===
In 2010, Swennen moved back to Brussels from Antwerp. The Kunstverein Freiburg organised his first institutional solo (2011) show outside the Benelux, followed by Continuer (2013), Culturgest in Lisbon. Through a selection of paintings from the last sixteen years, curator Miguel Wandschneider sought to emphasise Swennen's "ever keener awareness of the specific problems of painting". A comprehensive list of works from the early 1980s up to the present was established on the occasion of his retrospective So Far So Good (2013) at WIELS. Other international solo exhibitions followed, including Ein perfektes Alibi, Kunstverein für die Rheinlande und Westfalen, Düsseldorf (2015); White Columns, New York, NY, USA (2017) and La pittura farà da sé, La Triennale di Milano, Milan (2018). In 2021, the Kunstmuseum Bonn held a retrospective of his work. The exhibition traveled to Kunstmuseum Den Haag and Kunst Museum Winterthur.

In 2017, Violaine de Villers made a documentary on Swennen, titled La langue rouge (The Crimson Tongue).

In 2020, Swennen was given an Ultima award for visual arts from the Flemish Community, but donated the prize money to the political party Workers' Party of Belgium.

Swennen died on 14 August 2025, at the age of 79.

=== Selected exhibitions ===
Swennen has been the focus of several retrospectives at various international institutions, including La pittura farà da sé, La Triennale di Milano, Milan (2018); White Columns, New York, NY, USA (2017); Ein perfektes Alibi, Kunstverein für die Rheinlande und Westfalen, Düsseldorf (2015); So Far So Good, WIELS, Brussels (2013–14); Continuer, Culturgest Lisbon (2013); Garibaldi Slept Here, Kunstverein Freiburg (2012); How To Paint A Horse, Cultuurcentrum Strombeek; De Garage, Mechelen (2008); MuHKA, Antwerp, Belgium (1994) and Schilderijen, Kunsthal, Rotterdam, The Netherlands (1994) and Centre for Fine Arts, Brussels, Belgium (1986).

=== Public collections ===
Swennen's work is held in numerous public collections, including the Royal Museums of Fine Arts of Belgium, Brussels, Belgium; MuHKA, Antwerp, Belgium; M-Museum, Leuven, Belgium; MAC’s, Grand-Hornu, Belgium; Mu.ZEE, Ostend, Belgium; Museum of Ixelles, Brussels, Belgium; Beaux-Arts Mons, Mons, Belgium; KANAL - Centre Pompidou, Brussels, Belgium; Centre National des Arts Plastiques, Paris, France; Collection Ministry of Foreign Affairs, Belgium; Collection Ministry of Foreign Affairs, Portugal; Collection of the Flemish Community, Belgium; Collection of the Hainaut Province, Belgium; FRAC Auvergne, Clermont-Ferrand, France; FRAC Bretagne, Rennes, France; and FRAC Languedoc-Roussillon, Montpellier, France.

=== Selected artist's writings and publications ===
- Theys, Hans (2021). Walter Swennen - Too Many Words. Xavier Hufkens. ISBN 978-9491245275.
- Theys, Hans; Nicomède, Francis (2016). Hic Haec Hoc. Xavier Hufkens. ISBN 978-949-12451-69.
- Theys, Hans (2016). Ne Quid Nemis. Zonder Titel. ISBN 978-9090-298-98-6.
- Verschaffel, Bert (2015). Walter Swennen - Works on Paper. Xavier Hufkens. ISBN 9789491245107.
- Swennen, Walter; Pirenne, Raphaël; Snauwaert, Dirk (2013). Walter Swennen - So Far So Good (1 ed.). SIC. ISBN 978-2930667065.
- Swennen, Walter (2012). Walter Swennen, L’Antre de la Belle K, photographies de Daniel Dutrieux, edition of 500 copies, published by L’Usine à stars-Galerie Nadja Vilenne, Liège.
- Swennen, Walter (2011). I am Afraid I Told a Lie, offset printing on folded map, edition of 100 copies, published by Gevaert Editions, Brussels
- Fuchs, Rudi; Swennen, Walter (2008). Lambrecht, Luk; Leemans, Koen (eds.). Walter Swennen: How to Paint a Horse (in Belgian Dutch). Cultuurcentrum Mechelen. ISBN 9789077193204.
- Theys, Hans (2007). Congé annuel, Liège: L'usine à stars.
- Florizoone, Jan (2005). "Walter Swennen - PIF". Collection Memento 1. Art by Walter Swennen. La Lettre Volée. ISBN 9782873172251.
- Theys, Hans (1994). How to write about Walter Swennen? (Academic tergiversations). Antwerp: M HKA.
