= Jan Hoet =

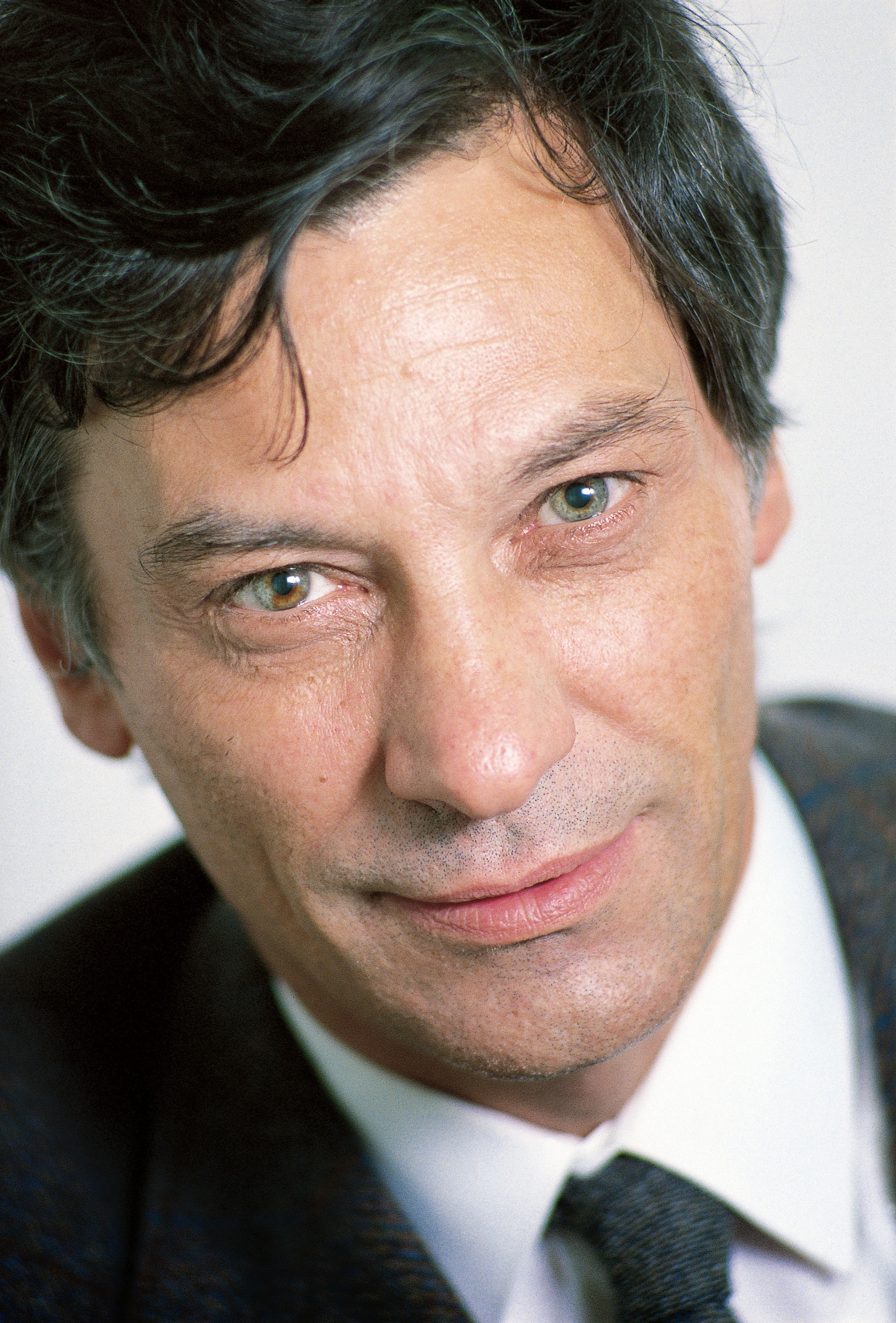
Jan Hoet (1989)

Knight Jan Hoet (Dutch pronunciation: [jɑn ˈɦut]; 23 June 1936 – 27 February 2014) was the Belgian founder of SMAK (Stedelijk Museum voor Actuele Kunst or Municipal Museum for Contemporary Art) in Ghent, Belgium.

== Biography ==
Jan Hoet was born in Leuven, Belgium. Throughout his career, he was often referred to in the press as a former boxer (he pursued the sport in college) and several times expressed an admiration for Mike Tyson. In the late 1960s and early 1970s he and photographer Rony Heirman made some comics together.

His international reputation was first established by "Chambres d'Amis," an innovative exhibition he organized in Ghent in 1986. In that show, about 50 American and European artists were invited to create works for 50 private homes in Ghent, which were then opened to the public for several weeks. Subsequently, he managed several important exhibitions all over the world.

Hoet curated Documenta IX in Kassel in 1992, presenting several hundred works by 190 artists from nearly 40 countries. Subsequently, he managed several important exhibitions all over the world.

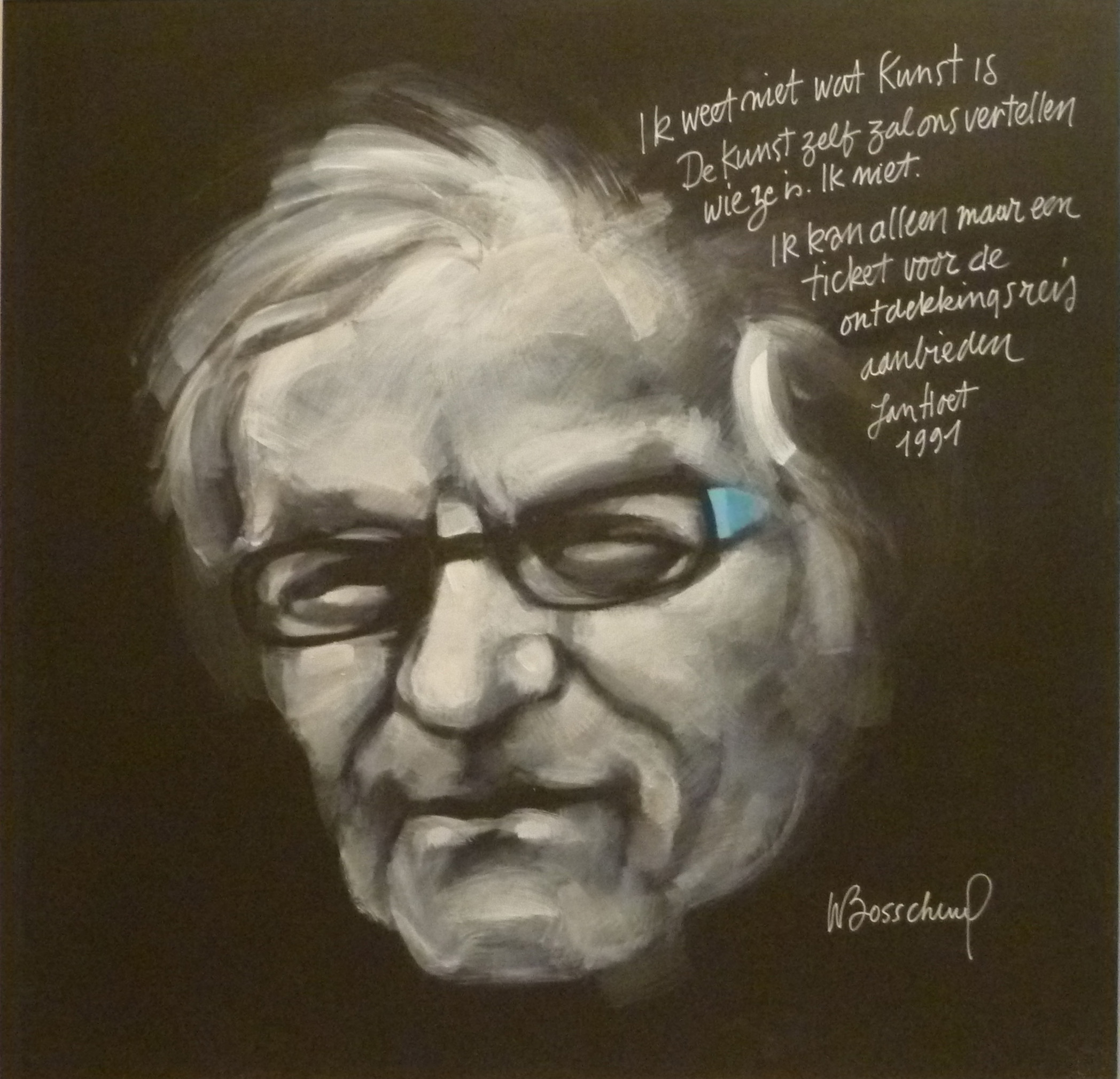
Jan Hoet by the Belgian painter Willy Bosschem

Hoet served as the curator of the SMAK from 1975 until his retirement in 2003. As part of the 2000 "Over the Edges" exhibition in Ghent, he let artist Jan Fabre drape columns of a university auditorium in slabs of ham. After retiring, in 2003, he became artistic director for the museum MARTa Herford in Herford (Germany) and collaborated with architect Frank Gehry on its design. The inaugural show in 2005 called “My Private Heroes” was an eclectic mix of works by artists including Marina Abramović, Chris Burden, Gavin Turk, Jean-Michel Basquiat and Joseph Beuys as well as history paintings, ephemera and a yellow jersey worn by a Tour de France winner.

On 17 June 2012 Jan Hoet collapsed at the airport in Hamburg. On 23 June 2012, while being repatriated to Ghent, Hoet suffered from hypercapnia and he was being held in a coma at the hospital of Soltau. Hoet was repatriated to Ghent. In January 2014 Hoet suffered a second heart attack. He died in a hospital in Ghent on 27 February 2014 and was buried in the Cemetery of Campo Santo.

== Recognition ==
In 1992, a Belgian magazine named Hoet one of the 10 sexiest people in Belgium. At the news of his death, the Belgian prime minister Elio Di Rupo tweeted that the Belgian art world “loses a father”. "He was invaluable," painter Luc Tuymans said of Hoet, who bought his first work and was instrumental in making Tuymans a global name in contemporary painting.

== Bibliography ==
- "Your Own Soul: Ingrid Mwangi" by Ingrid Mwangi, Jan Hoet, and Gislind Nabakowski (Hardcover - 1 September 2003)
- "Flemish and Dutch Painting: From Van Gogh, Ensor, Magritte, Mondrian to Contemporary Artists" by Rudi Fuchs and Jan Hoet (Hardcover - 15 June 1997)
- "Bjarne Melgaard: Black Low" by Bjarne Melgaard, Jan Hoet, and Ann Demester (Hardcover - 2 March 2003)
- "Positions In Art (Reihe Cantz)" by Chris Burden, Kiki Smith, James Turrell, and Jan Hoet (Paperback - 2 July 1995)
