= Museum of Contemporary Art, Antwerp =

M HKA
- Museum van Hedendaagse Kunst Antwerpen
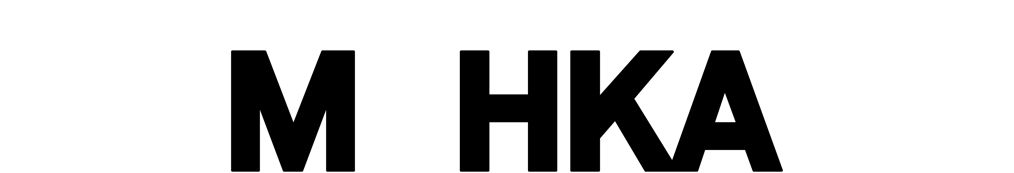

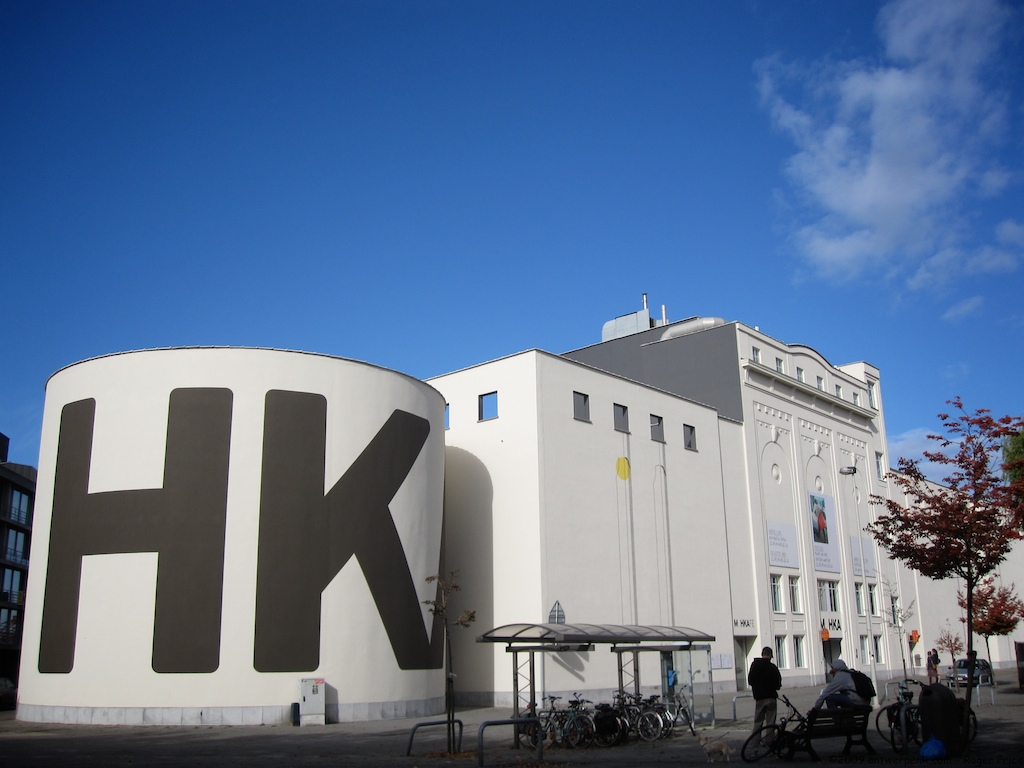
- Museum of Contemporary Art, Antwerp.

- Location of M HKA in Antwerp
- Established: 20 September 1985
- Location: Leuvenstraat 32 2000 Antwerpen, Belgium
- Coordinates: 51.211111°N 4.389722°E
- Type: Art museum
- Collections: Contemporary Art
- Collection size: 2.039 (2012)
- Visitors: 147 000 (2017)
- Director: Bart de Baere
- Website: http://www.muhka.be/

The Museum of Contemporary Art in Antwerp (Dutch: Museum van Hedendaagse Kunst, commonly abbreviated as M HKA, previously MuHKA) is the contemporary art museum of the city of Antwerp, Belgium. Its current director is Bart de Baere.

== Overview ==
The museum holds a permanent collection of contemporary art from Belgian and international artists, an arthouse cinema and an extensive library of books on contemporary art.

== History ==
The Museum of Contemporary Art was founded in 1982 by the Flemish Community. M HKA's first director was Flor Bex until 1992. In 2002, Bart de Baere took position. The architect responsible for the creation of the museum from an old grain storage space (1987) was Michel Grandsard who also designed the extension of the museum (1997). Current exhibition curators are Nav Haq, Liliane Dewachter, Anne-Claire Schmitz and Joanna Zielińska. From 2003 until 2011 Dieter Roelstraete was a curator at the Antwerp Museum of Contemporary Art (MuHKA).

=== Closure of the Museum ===
In October 2025, the Flemish government announced plans to dissolve the Museum of Contemporary Art Antwerp and transfer its collection to the Stedelijk Museum voor Actuele Kunst (S.M.A.K.) in Ghent. The decision forms part of a broader reform of Flanders’ museum network, which aims to reorganize public collections and centralize the region’s contemporary art holdings. The government justified the move by citing the need for a clearer institutional structure, concerns about the financial viability of a proposed €130 million new building for M HKA, and an internal evaluation that reportedly raised questions about the museum’s mission and performance. Under the proposal, M HKA would lose its status as a state museum and continue to operate as an art centre focused on exhibitions and residencies rather than maintaining its own collection. The plan has provoked significant criticism from museum professionals and members of the Belgian art community, who argue that it undermines Antwerp’s cultural heritage and was made without sufficient consultation.

The plan has provoked significant criticism from museum professionals and members of the Belgian art community such as Luc Tuymans and Anish Kapoor, who argue that it undermines Antwerp’s cultural heritage and was made without sufficient consultation.

== Solo exhibitions (selection) ==
- 2019: Soleil Politique Marcel Broodthaers
- 2019: The Perfect Kiss James Lee Byars
- 2019: AM-BIG-YOU-US LEGSICON Laure Prouvost
- 2018: AMVK Anne-Mie Van Kerckhoven
- 2018: Names Jef Geys
- 2017: Greetings from the Eurasian Joseph Beuys
- 2017: Romulus Peter Wächtler
- 2016: The Secret of Permanent Creation Robert Filliou
- 2015: Bruises and Lustre Otobong Nkanga
- 2015: The Shape of the words Fabrice Hyber
- 2013: Jos de Gruyter & Harald Thys Optimundus
- 2012: A Matter of Life and Death and Singing Jimmie Durham
- 1999: Nursing Care, in Melancholy Stupor Anne-Mie Van Kerckhoven
