= Stedelijk Museum voor Actuele Kunst =

Museum in Ghent, Belgium

Coordinates: 51°02′18″N 3°43′22″E

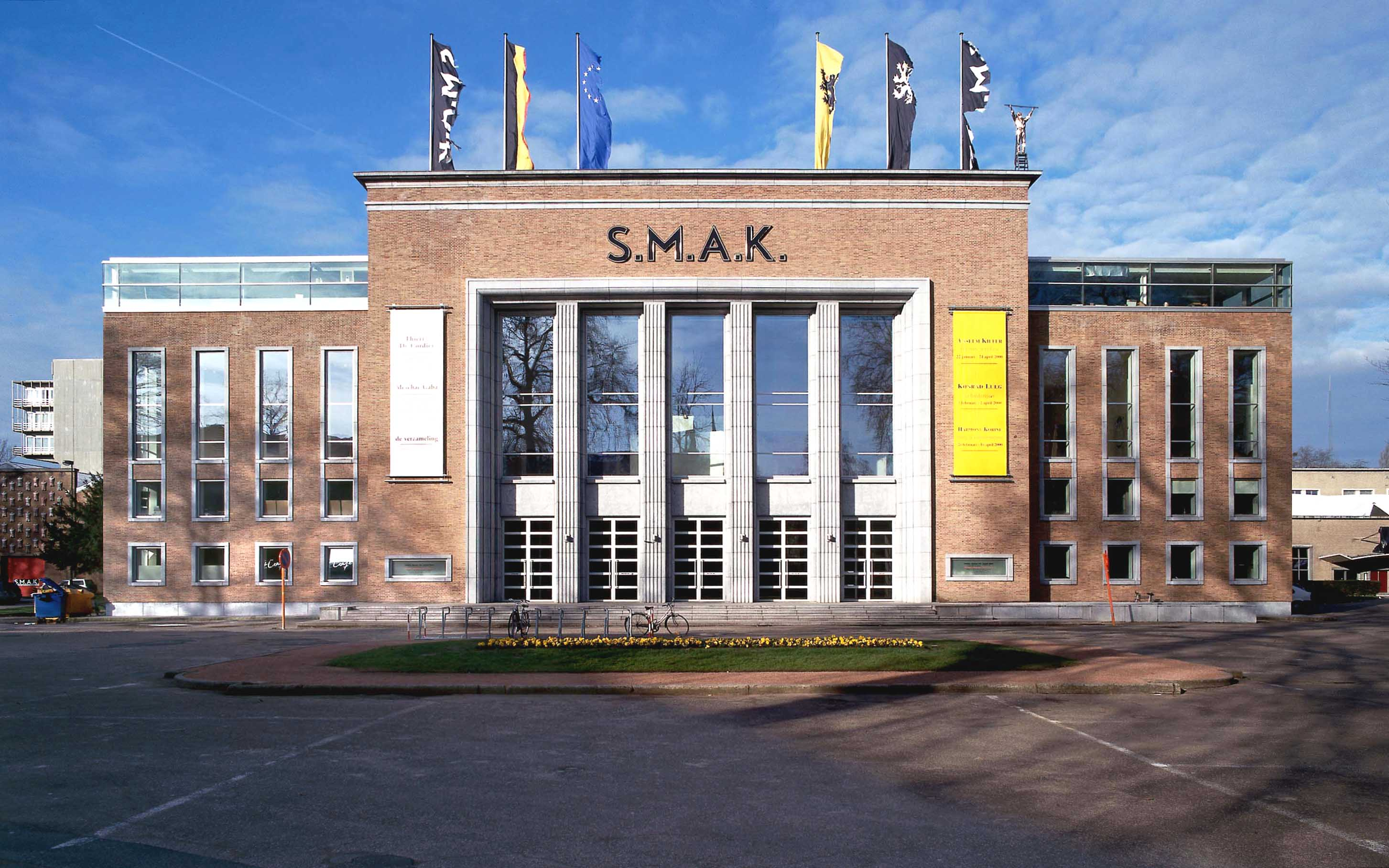
The S.M.A.K. building

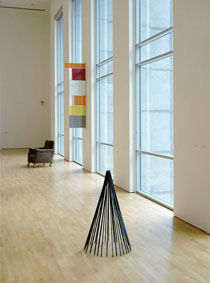
Jürgen Partenheimer, La robe des choses, S.M.A.K, 2002

The Stedelijk Museum voor Actuele Kunst (commonly abbreviated as S.M.A.K., translated as City Museum for Contemporary Art) is a relatively new museum located in Ghent, Belgium, and is renowned both for its permanent collection (Art & Language, Karel Appel, Francis Bacon, Panamarenko, Andy Warhol, etc.) and for its provocative exhibitions.

== History ==
The new museum opened to the public on 7 May 1999. The collection concentrates on international developments in art after 1945, and was based upon works collected by the Contemporary Art Museum Association (created on 8 November 1957 at the instigation of Karel Geirlandt) and the Museum voor Hedendaagse Kunst (set up in 1975 as the first Belgian museum devoted to contemporary art, housed in the Museum of Fine Arts, with Jan Hoet appointed as director).

After Jan Hoet retired from the museum on 1 December 2003, Peter Doroshenko was in charge. After a trial period of one year, he was dismissed. The dismissal of Doroshenko caused much commotion. Artists and curators, headed by Luc Tuymans, feared for the future and independence of the museum. A petition was handed to the Chairman of the Board of Directors; culture vassals Sas Van Rouveroij. The dismissal was not reversed, but there were some changes in the organizational structure of the museum. Thus, Jan Hoet gave up his seat on the board of directors.

Current directors are Philippe Van Cauteren (art director) and Philippe Vandenweghe (business director).

== See also ==
- Museum of Fine Arts, Ghent
