= Hans-Ulrich Obrist bibliography =

This is a bibliography for Hans-Ulrich Obrist (born 1968), a Swiss art curator, critic and historian of art.

== Works ==
=== Books ===
2024

- Hans Ulrich Obrist, Conversations in Chile: Hans Ulrich Obrist Interviews. D21 Editores/KMEC Books.

2023

- Hans Ulrich Obrist, Remember to Dream! London, HENI publishing, 2023.

2015

- Shumon Basar, Douglas Coupland, Hans Ulrich Obrist, The Age of Earthquakes: A Guide to the Extreme Present. London: Penguin, 2015; New York: Blue Rider Press, 2015; Frankfurt Am Main: Eichborn, 2015.
- Hans Ulrich Obrist Ever Louise in Alex Van Gelder, Mumbling Beauty Louise Bourgeois. New York: Thames & Hudson, 2015.

2014

- Hans Ulrich Obrist, Ways of Curating. New York: Faber & Faber, 2014.
- Hans Ulrich Obrist, "Think Like Clouds". New York: Badlands Unlimited, 2014.

2013

- Hans Ulrich Obrist and Sarah Morris, An Open System Meets an Open System: Sarah Morris and Hans Ulrich Obrist in Conversation. New York: Springer Wien, 2013.
- Hans Ulrich Obrist (ed. by Lionel Bovier), A Brief History of New Music. Zürich & Dijon: JRP|Ringier & Les presses du réel, 2013.

2012

- Hans Ulrich Obrist, The Conversation Series, Number 22— Jeff Koons. Köln: Verlag der Buchhandlung Walther Konig, 2012.

2011

- Hans Ulrich Obrist, Everything You Always Wanted to Know About Curating But Were Afraid to Ask. Designed Zak Kyes, Zak Group. London: Sternberg Press, 2007.
- Catherine Bernard, Hans Ulrich Obrist, Slavoj Zizek, et al., Johan Grimonprez: It's a Poor Sort of Memory that Only Works Backwards. Ed. Benoit Detalle. Ostfildern-Ruit: Hatje Cantz, 2011.
- Monir Shahroudy Farmanfarmaian: Cosmic Geometry Edited by Hans Ulrich Obrist and Karen Marta. Bologna: Damiani Editore & The Third Line, 2011.
- Project Japan: Metabolism Talks by Rem Koolhaas, Hans Ulrich Obrist, Kayoko Ota, James Westcott; published by Taschen; 2011

2010

- Diedrich Diederichsen, Hans Ulrich Obrist, and Angela Rosenberg, Bettina Pousttchi: Echo Berlin. Köln: Verlag der Buchhandlung Walther König, 2010.
- Hans Ulrich Obrist, What Good is the Moon? The Exhibitions of Fondazione Nicola Trussardi. Ed. Massimiliano Gioni. Ostfildern-Ruit: Hatje Cantz Verlag, 2010.
- Hans Ulrich Obrist, Cerith Wyn Evans: Every One's Gone to the Movies Now We're Alone at Last. London: White Cube, 2010.
- Hans Ulrich Obrist, Contraband: Taryn Simon. Göttingen and New York: Steidl & Gagosian Gallery, 2010.
- Hans Ulrich Obrist, Dontstopdontstopdontstopdontstop. Milan: Postmedia Books, 2010.
- Gilbert and George Art Titles 1969-2010. Ed. Hans Ulrich Obrist and Inigo Philbrick. Köln: Verlag der Buchhandlung Walther König, 2010.
- Hans Ulrich Obrist, Hans Ulrich Obrist: Interviews, Volume 2. Ed. Charles Arsène-Henry, Shumon Basar, and Karen Marta. Milan and New York: Charta, 2010.
- Hans Ulrich Obrist and Hans-Peter Feldmann, Interview. Köln: Verlag der Buchhandlung Walther König, 2010.
- Gerhard Richter, Obrist-O’Brist. Köln: Verlag der Buchhandlung Walther König, 2010.
- Subodh Gupta and Hans Ulrich Obrist, Subodh Gupta: Common Man. Ed. Sara Harrison and Michaela Unterdorfer. Zurich: Hauser & Wirth with JPR Ringier, 2010.
- Hans Ulrich Obrist, The Conversation Series, Number 5—Rosmarie Trockel. Köln: Verlag der Buchhandlung Walther Konig, 2010.
- Hans Ulrich Obrist, The Conversation Series, Number 6—Wolfgang Tillmans. Köln: Verlag der Buchhandlung Walther Konig, 2010.
- Hans Ulrich Obrist, The Morning Line: Mathew Ritchie Aranda/ Lasch Arup Agu. Thyssen-Bornemisza Art Contemporary. Köln: Verlag der Buchhandlung Walther König, 2010.

2009

- Style and Scale, or: Do You Have Anxiety? A Conversation with Ken Adam, Katharina Fritsch and Hans Ulrich Obrist. Ed. Bice Curiger, et al. Wien: Springer, 2009.
- Gerhard Richter, Gerhard Richter—Text: Writings, Interviews and Letters 1961-2007. Ed. Dietmar Elger and Hans Ulrich Obrist. London: Thames & Hudson, 2009.
- Serpentine Gallery Manifesto Marathon, Curated by Julia Peyton-Jones, Hans Ulrich Obrist & Nicola Lees. Ed. Nicola Lees. Designed Zak Kyes, Zak Group. Köln: Verlag der Buchhandlung Walther König, 2009.
- Hans Ulrich Obrist and Ellsworth Kelly, Thumbing Through the Folder: A Dialogue. Köln: Verlag der Buchhandlung Walther König, 2009.
- "Hans Ulrich Obrist: A Conversation with Anri and Evis Sala", in Calling All the Stations. Ed. Michele Robecchi and Gazmend Ejupi, Galeria e Arteve, Prishtina, Kosovo, 2009.
- Thomas Demand und die Nationalgalerie: Gespräch über die Ausstellung mit/A Conversation About the Exhibition with Hans Ulrich Obrist, Berlin 2009. Ed. Hans Ulrich Obrist. Köln: Verlag der Buchhandlung Walther König, 2009.
- Susan Hefuna: Pars Pro Toto II. Ed. Hans Ulrich Obrist. Heidelberg: Kehrer Verlag Heidelberg, 2009.
- Hans Ulrich Obrist, The Conversation Series, Number 15—Enzo Mari. Köln: Verlag der Buchhandlung Walther Konig, 2009.
- Hans Ulrich Obrist, The Conversation Series, Number 16—Gustav Metzger. Köln: Verlag der Buchhandlung Walther Konig, 2009.
- Hans Ulrich Obrist, The Conversation Series, Number 17—Yoko Ono. Köln: Verlag der Buchhandlung Walther Konig, 2009.
- Hans Ulrich Obrist, The Conversation Series, Number 18— John Baldessari. Köln: Verlag der Buchhandlung Walther Konig, 2009.
- Hans Ulrich Obrist, The Conversation Series, Number 19— Christian Boltanski. Köln: Verlag der Buchhandlung Walther Konig, 2009.
- Hans Ulrich Obrist, The Conversation Series, Number 21— Cedric Price. Köln: Verlag der Buchhandlung Walther Konig, 2009.
- Ways Beyond Art—Ai Weiwei. Ed. Elena Ochoa Foster and Hans Ulrich Obrist. Madrid and London: Ivory Press, 2009.
- Maria Lassnig: The Pen is the Sister of the Brush. Diaries 1943-1997. Ed. Hans Ulrich Obrist. Göttingen and Zürich: Steidl, Hauser and Wirth, 2009.

2008

- Formulas For Now. Ed. Hans Ulrich Obrist. London: Thames and Hudson, 2008.
- Susan Hefuna: Pars Pro Toto. Ed. Hans Ulrich Obrist. Heidelberg: Kehrer Verlag Heidelberg, 2008.
- Damien Hirst: Beyond Belief. Ed. Hans Ulrich Obrist, et al. London: Other Criteria, 2008.
- Hans Ulrich Obrist, A Brief History of Curating. Zurich: JRP|Ringier, 2008.
- Hans Ulrich Obrist, The Conversation Series, Number 11—Nancy Spero. Köln: Verlag der Buchhandlung Walther König, 2008.
- Hans Ulrich Obrist, The Conversation Series, Number 12—Dominique Gonzales-Foester. Köln: Verlag der Buchhandlung Walther Konig, 2008.
- Hans Ulrich Obrist, The Conversation Series, Number 13—Olafur Eliasson. Köln: Verlag der Buchhandlung Walther König, 2008.
- Hans Ulrich Obrist, The Conversation Series, Number 14—Philippe Parreno. Köln: Verlag der Buchhandlung Walther Konig, 2008.

2007

- Hans Ulrich Obrist, et al. Curating Subjects. Ed. Paul O'Neill. London: Open Editions, 2007.
- The Future Will Be… Ed. Hans Ulrich Obrist. Designed M/M (Paris). Paris: Onestar Press, 2007.
- Merz World: Processing the Complicated Order. Ed. Hans Ulrich Obrist and Adrian Notz. Zurich: JRP|Ringier, 2007.
- Serpentine Gallery 24-hour Interview Marathon. Ed. Rem Koolhaas, Hans Ulrich Obrist, and Julia Peyton-Jones. London: Trolley, 2007.
- Louise Bourgeois. Ed. Lionel Bovier and Hans Ulrich Obrist. Zurich: JRP|Ringier, 2007.
- Thomas Bayrle: 40 Years of Chinese Rock 'n' Roll. Ed. Hans Ulrich Obrist, Daniel Birnbaum, and Udo Kittelmann. Zurich: Buchhandlung Walther Konig, 2007.
- Totalstadt - Beijing Case: High-speed Urbanization in China. Ed. Hans Ulrich Obrist, Yung Ho Change and Hao Hanru. Zurich: Buchhandlung Walther Konig, 2007.
- Hans Ulrich Obrist, The Conversation Series, Number 4—Rem Koolhaas. Köln: Verlag der Buchhandlung Walther Konig, 2007.
- Hans Ulrich Obrist, The Conversation Series, Number 6—Wolfgang Tillmans. Köln: Verlag der Buchhandlung Walther Konig, 2007.
- Hans Ulrich Obrist, The Conversation Series, Number 7—Yona Friedman. Köln: Verlag der Buchhandlung Walther Konig, 2007.
- Hans Ulrich Obrist, The Conversation Series, Number 8—Zaha Hadid. Köln: Verlag der Buchhandlung Walther Konig, 2007.
- Hans Ulrich Obrist, The Conversation Series, Number 9—Gilbert and George. Köln: Verlag der Buchhandlung Walther Konig, 2007.
- Hans Ulrich Obrist, The Conversation Series, Number 10—Thomas Demand. Köln: Verlag der Buchhandlung Walther Konig, 2007.
- Hans Ulrich Obrist, dontstopdontstopdontstopdontstop. French ed. Trans. Aude Tincelin. Dijon and Zurich: Les presses du reel and JRP|Ringier, 2007.
- 00s—The History of the Decade That Has Not Yet Been Named. Ed. Hans Ulrich Obrist and Stephanie Moisdon. Zurich: JRP|Ringier, 2007.
- A Brief History of Curating Dijon and Zurich: Les presses du réel and JRP|Ringier, 2007.

2006

- Hans Ulrich Obrist, dontstopdontstopdontstopdontstop. New York: Sternberg Press, 2006.
- Mathew Barney: Drawing Restraint: 1987-2002, v. 1. Ed. Francis McKee and Hans Ulrich Obrist. Köln: Verlag der Buchhandlung Walther Konig, 2006.
- Anri Sala. Ed. Hans Ulrich Obrist, Mark Godfrey, and Liam Gillick. London: Phaidon Press, 2006.
- Louise Coysh, Lars Bang Larsen, Hans Ulrich Obrist, Andrea Philips and Emily Pringle, Dis-assembly—Faisal Abdu'allah, Christian Boltanski, Yona Friedman, Runa Islam: A Serpentine Gallery Project with North Westminster Community School. Ed. Sally Tallant. London: Serpentine Gallery, 2006.
- In the Darkest Hour There May Be Light: Works from Damien Hirst's Murderme Collection. Ed. Damien Hirst, Hans Ulrich Obrist, and Harland Miller. London: Serpentine Gallery, 2006.
- Bruce Arnold, Mel Gooding, and Hans Ulrich Obrist, Barry Flanagan: Sculpture 1965-2005. Ed. Enrique Juncosa. Dublin: Irish Museum of Modern Art, 2006.
- Hans Ulrich Obrist, The Goose Lake Trail (southern route) —A Road Conversation between Olafur Eliasson and Hans Ulrich Obrist. Köln: Verlag der Buchhandlung Walther Konig, 2006.
- The air is blue: Insights on art and architecture: Luis Barragan Revisited. Ed. Hans Ulrich Obrist and Pedro Reyes. Mexico City and New York: Trilce and D.A.P., 2006.
- Hans Ulrich Obrist, The Conversation Series, Number 1—Robert Crumb. Köln: Verlag der Buchhandlung Walther Konig, 2006.
- Hans Ulrich Obrist, The Conversation Series, Number 2—John Chamberlain. Köln: Verlag der Buchhandlung Walther König, 2006.
- Hans Ulrich Obrist, The Conversation Series, Number 3—Konrad Klapheck/Hans-Peter Feldmann. Köln: Verlag der Buchhandlung Walther Konig, 2006.

2005

- Mark Manders. Ed. Hans Ulrich Obrist, Rachel Thomas, and Marta Kuzma. Dublin: Irish Museum of Modern Art, 2005.
- Uncertain States of America: American Art in the 3rd Millennium. Ed. Daniel Birnbaum, Gunnar B. Kvaran, and Hans Ulrich Obrist. Oslo: Astrup Fearney Museum of Modern Art, 2005.
- Hans Ulrich Obrist, Smithson Time. Peter Smithson & Hans Ulrich Obrist: A Dialogue. Köln: Verlag der Buchhandlung Walther König, 2005.

2004

- do it. Ed. Hans Ulrich Obrist. New York and Frankfurt: e-flux and Revolver, 2004.

2003

- Hans Ulrich Obrist: Interviews. Charta/Fondazione Pitti Immagine Discovery, 2003.
- Anri Sala, A Thousand Windows – The World of the Insane. Ed. Hans Ulrich Obrist. Köln: Verlag der Buchhandlung Walther König, 2003.
- Hans Ulrich Obrist: Interviews, Volume 1. Ed. Thomas Boutoux. Milan and New York: Fondazione Pitti Immagine Discovery and Charta, 2003.
- Hans Ulrich Obrist, Layout: Philip Johnson in Conversation with Rem Koolhaas and Hans Ulrich Obrist. Cologne: Verlag der Buchhandlung Walther König, 2003.

2002

- Interarchive: Archival Practices and Sites in the Contemporary Art Field. Ed. Beatrice von Bismarck, Hans-Peter Feldmann, Hans Ulrich Obrist, Diethelm Stoller, and Ulf Wuggenig. Lüneburg and Köln: Verlag der Buchhandlung Walther König, 2002.
- Bridge the Gap? Ed. Akiko Miyake and Hans Ulrich Obrist. Kitakyushu and Köln: Center for Contemporary Art Kitakyushu and Verlag der Buchhandlung Walther König, 2002.

2001

- Douglas Gordon, Punishment Exercise in Gothic. Ed. Hans Ulrich Obrist. Köln: Oktagon, 2001.
- Tirana Biennale 1, Galeria Kombetare e Arteve, Tirana, and Giancarlo Politi Editore, Milan, 2001.
- do it hazlo. Ed. Pamela Echeverría and Hans Ulrich Obrist. San Ángel: Museo de arte Carrillo Gil, 2001.
- Laboratorium. Ed. Hans Ulrich Obrist and Barbara Vanderlinden. Köln: DuMont, 2001.

2000

- Weltwissen Wissenwelt: Das globale Netz von Text und Bild. Ed. Christa Maar, Hans Ulrich Obrist and Ernst Pöppel. Cologne: DuMont Verlag, 2000.

1999

- Sogni/Dreams. Ed. Hans Ulrich Obrist and Francesco Bonami. Torino: Fondazione Sandretto Re Rebaudengo Per l'Arte, 1999.

1998

- Carsten Höller, Carsten Höller's Spiele Buch. Ed. Hans Ulrich Obrist. Köln: Oktagon, 1998.
- John Baldessari, Zorro. Ed. Hans Ulrich Obrist. Köln: Oktagon, 1998.
- Louise Bourgeois, Destruction of the Father, Reconstruction of the Mother: Writings and Interviews 1923-1997. Ed. Marie-Laure Bernadac and Hans Ulrich Obrist. London: Violette Editions, 1998.

1997

- Leon Golub, Leon Golub: Do Paintings Bite? Selected Texts 1948-1996. Ed. Hans Ulrich Obrist. Ostfildern: Cantz Verlag, 1997.
- The Words of Gilbert & George, with Portraits of the Artists from 1968 to 1997. Ed. Hans Ulrich Obrist and Robert Violette. London: Violette Editions, 1997.
- Nobuyoshi Araki, Polaroid. Ed. Hans Ulrich Obrist. Köln: Oktagon Verlag, 1997.
- Unbuilt Roads, 107 Unrealised Projects. Ed. Hans Ulrich Obrist and Guy Tortosa. Münster: Hatje-Cantz, 1997.
- Hans Ulrich Obrist, "Coffee Break Talk." Let's Talk About Art. Ed. Nobuo Nakamura and Akiko Miyake. Kitakyushu and Kyoto: CCA Kitakyushu and Korinsha Press, 1997.

1996

- Gilbert & George, Oh, the Grand old Duke of York. Ed. Hans Ulrich Obrist. Köln: Oktagon Verlag, 1996.
- Gerhard Richter, 100 Bilder. Ed. Hans Ulrich Obrist. Ostfildern: Cantz Verlag, 1996.
- Hans Ulrich Obrist, Delta X: Der Kurator als Katalysator. Regensburg: Lindinger & Schmid Verlag, 1996.
- do it. Thai Version, Bangkok. Organized by Hans Ulrich Obrist. Ed. Sursai Kusolwong et al. Bangkok: Alliance Française de Bangkok and Bangkok University, 1996.

1995

- Christian Boltanski, Les Vacances à Berck-Plage (Aout 1975). Ed. Hans Ulrich Obrist. Stuttgart: Oktagon Verlag, 1995. *Annette Messager, Nos Témoignages. Ed. Hans Ulrich Obrist. Stuttgart: Oktagon Verlag, 1995.
- Peter Fischli and David Weiss, Bericht über den künstlerischen Schmuck im Neubau der Börse Zürich. Ed. Hans Ulrich Obrist. Stuttgart: Oktagon Verlag, 1995.
- Gabriel Orozco, Triunfo de la libertad No. 18 Tlalpan, C.P. 14000. Ed. Hans Ulrich Obrist. Stuttgart: Oktagon Verlag, 1995.
- Gerhard Richter, The Daily Practice of Painting: Writings and Interviews 1962-1993. Ed. Hans Ulrich Obrist. Trans. David Britt. London: Anthony D'Offay, Gallery, 1995.
- Do It. (9-language version: German, English, Arabic, Chinese, Spanish, French, Japanese, Portuguese, and Russian.) Ed. Hans Ulrich Obrist. Paris: Association Française d'Action Artistique, Ministère des Affaires Éstrangères, 1995.

1994

- Bertrand Lavier, Argo. Ed. Hans Ulrich Obrist. Ostfildern: Cantz Verlag, 1994.
- Cloaca Maxima. Ed. Hans Ulrich Obrist. Ostfildern: Cantz Verlag, 1994.

1993

- Gerhard Richter, Gerhard Richter, Text: Schriften und Interviews. Ed. Hans Ulrich Obrist. Frankfurt and Leipzig: Insel Verlag, 1993.
- Paul-Armand Gette, Nymphaeum. Ed. Hans Ulrich Obrist. Köln: Oktagon Verlag, 1993.
- World Soup Küchenausstellung 1991. Ed. Hans Ulrich Obrist. München and Stuttgart: Oktagon Verlag, 1993.
- Paris-Hamburg-Frankfurt: Neue Kunst in Hamburg, 1993. Ed. and Int. Kasper König and Hans Ulrich Obrist. Hamburg: Kunstverein Hamburg, 1993.
- Biefer / Zgraggen, Prophecies. Ed. Hans Ulrich Obrist. Zürich and Venice: Sammlung Hauser & Wirth and Aperto 93/Biennale of Venice, 1993.

1992

- Gerhard Richter, Sils. Ed. Hans Ulrich Obrist. Stuttgart: Oktagon Verlag, 1992.

=== Interviews and articles in other publications ===
2014

- The Relative Obscurity Of The Writings Of Édouard Glissant, in: What Should We Be Worried About? Real Scenarios That Keep Scientists Up at Night. Ed. by John Brockman. Harper Perennial, New York 2014, pp. 214–217. Also on Edge.

2011

- Thomas Bayrle and Hans Ulrich Obrist, "A conversation with Alexander Kluge", Atlántica Issue #50, Spring/Summer 2011.
- Contributor to: Dr. Ekaterina Rietz-Rakul and Steve Schepens, Berlin Contemporary Art. Berlin: Grebennikov Verlag GmbH, 2011.
- Stuart Corner and Hans Ulrich Obrist interview with William Leavitt, "Cutaway View", Mousse Issue #27, February–March 2011.
- "Hans Ulrich Obrist in Conversation with Tehching Hsieh", Modern Weekly China Issue #642, April 2011.
- "Interview with Dara Birnbaum" in Karen Kelly, Barbara Schroder and Giel Vandecaveye, Dara Birnbaum: The Dark Matter of Media Light. London: Prestel Publishing, 2011.
- "Interview with Raja and Shadia Alem", The Black Arch, Ministry of Culture and Information, Kingdom of Saudi Arabia, 2011.
- "Interview with Yu Youhan", Leap Issue #07, 2011.
- Contributor to Juliet Art Magazine No. 150, December 2010-January 2011.
- "NO TRUST, NO CITY, Hans Ulrich Obrist interviews Benjamin Foster-Baldenius, Markus Bader, Matthias Rick and Jan Liesegang", Futura Magazine, March–April 2011.
- "Why Ai Blogged", excerpt from Hans Ulrich Obrist, Ai Weiwei Speaks, The Sunday Times, May 29, 2011. Issue #07, 2011.

2010

- "John Latham: Canvas Events", featuring the artist in conversation with Hans Ulrich Obrist and Barbara Steveni. London: Ridinghouse, 2010.
- "Exhibition Prosthetics: In Conversation with Joseph Grigely and Zak Kyes" in Joseph Grigely, "Exhibition Prosthetics." Designed Zak Group. London: Bedford Press, 2010.
- "An interview with Emily Wardill", Map magazine Issue #23, Autumn 2010.
- "Biennale Manifesto", Log Issue #20, Fall 2010.
- "Architecture with a Big ’A’: Interview with Hans Ulrich Obrist" in Markus Miessen, The Nightmare of Participation. Berlin: Sternberg Press, 2010.
- "Breaking Away From Painting: An interview with Enrico Castellani", Mousse Issue #24, Summer 2010.
- "Close Encounters: The quest for urban wellbeing: Alain de Botton in conversation with Hans Ulrich Obrist, A Swiss-UK dialogue", Urban Sustainability: A Contradiction in terms?, Embassy of Switzerland, 2010.
- "Future will be hurricane, Hans Ulrich Obrist im Gesprach mit Michael M. Toss", Woodstock of Political Thinking, Theater der Zeit, 2010.
- "Hans Ulrich Obrist in conversation with Hamles Hovsepian", RES Art World / World Art Issue #6, November 2010.
- "Independent Muse: Hans Ulich Obrist interviews Tilda Swinton", Numéro Issue #117, October 2010.
- Interview with Andrea Branzi, "Design Miami 2010", Tabloid No. 17, November 2010.
- "John Maeda: An Interview by Hans Ulrich Obrist", Klat Issue #3, Summer 2010.
- "Kenneth Anger talks to Cerith Wyn Evans and Hans Ulrich Obrist", Tank Vol. 6, Issue #3, 2010.
- "Kunst im 21. Jahrhundert & Manifest & Brigitte Ulmer in conversation with Hans Ulrich Obrist", Das kulturmagazin Du n. 807, June 2010.
- "Louvre is my Studio, Street is my Museum: Braco Dimitrijevic in conversation with Hans Ulrich Obrist", Flash Art Vol. XLIII, No. 275, November–December 2010.
- "Mor(t)al Landscape: Hans Ulrich Obrist interviews Patrizio di Massimo", Kaleidoscope Issue #6, April–May 2010.
- "No Deacessioning No Cry", Marktplatz Museum: Sollen Museen Kunst verkaufen dürfen Ed. Dirk Boll. Rufer & Rub, 2010.
- "Nothing in our Hands, Nothing in our Pockets: Hans Ulrich Obrist in conversation with Claude Parent", Abitare Issue #20, 2010.
- Contributor to Antony Gormley, One and Other. London: Jonathan Cape, 2010.
- "Other Art: Louise Bourgeois", AnOther Magazine Issue #19, Autumn-Winter 2010.
- "Tavares Strachan The Final Frontier", Now: Art of the 21st Century. New York: Phillips de Pury Company, March 2010.
- "The Chinese Thinking: Hans Ulrich Obrist in conversation with Ou Ning, Rem Koolhaas & Jiang Jun", Life Special edition #53, 2010.
- "The Mother of All Lists – An Incomplete A-Z of the Internet", Hedonist's Guide to Art. Ed. Laura K. Jones. London: Filmer Ltd., 2010.
- Contributor to Three attempts for a catalogue raisonne of the work of Alberto Garutti. Ed. Andrea Viliani. Milan: Kaleidoscope Press, 2011.
- "Ways Beyond Objects: An interview with Francesca von Habsburg", Meet Art: Crossing Limits; Vienna Art Week 2010. Wien: Vienna Art Week, 2010.
- Contributor to Who Cares? 16 Essays on Curating in Asia. Ed. Alvaro Rodriguez Fominaya and Michael Lee. Hong Kong: Para / Site Art Space, 2010.

2009

- "Book Machine: Graphic Design for and (in) the future", Zak Kyes in conversation with Hans Ulrich Obrist, Kaleidoscope magazine, Summer 2009.

2007

- "Futures, Cities", Journal of Visual Culture 6.3, December 2007.

2006'

- "Interview with Paul Chan", Contemporary no. 84, September 2006.

2004

- "The Museum of the Future: Art, Architecture, Science, and Technology", Yishu: Journal of Contemporary Chinese Art 3.2, June 2004.

2003

- "Moving Interventions: Curating at Large (Hans Ulrich Obrist in conversation with Vivian Rehberg, with an interlude by Stefano Boeri).", Journal of Visual Culture Vol. 2, No. 2, August 2003.

1998

- Hans Ulrich Obrist, “Introduction,” do it (Ljubljana). Ed. Gregor Podnar. Ljubljana: Galerija Skuc, 1998.

1996

- "Towards a Promenadology and about Peripheries", Robert Walser and the Visual Arts. Ed. Tamara S. Evans. New York: The Graduate School and University Center, The City University of New York, 1996.

=== Exhibition catalogues ===
2011

- Hans Ulrich Obrist, Interview with Günther Uecker. Günther Uecker: The Early Years, L&M Arts, March 2011.
- Hans Ulrich Obrist, Interview with Heinz Mack. Heinz Mack: Licht-Raum-Farbe, Kunst- und Ausstellungshalle der Bundesrepublik Deutschland, March 2011.
- Hans Ulrich Obrist, Interview with Vítor Pomar. Nothing to do nowhere to go, Vítor Pomar, Calouste Gulbenkian Museum, April 2011.
- Hans Ulrich Obrist, Interview with Zaha Hadid. Zaha Hadid: Une Architecture, Institut du Monde Arabe, Editions Hazan, April 2011
- Hans Ulrich Obrist, Multiplications: Christoph Schlingensief in Conversation with Hans Ulrich Obrist. Christoph Schlingensief: Fluxus-oratorio, German Pavilion, La Biennale di Venezia, Sternberg Press, 2011.

2010

- Daniel Birnbaum, Frances Morris, and Hans Ulrich Obrist, Changing perspectives in the Age of Commoditization of Art Object. A publication for the KIAF/10 International Conference, 2010.
- Hans Ulrich Obrist, A Mapping Archipelago Catalogue for Serpentine Map Marathon. Ed. Nicola Lees and Lucia Pietroiusti. Serpentine Gallery, 2010.
- Hans Ulrich Obrist, China Power Station. Pinacoteca Agnelli, Turin, Fondazione Pinacoteca del Lingotto, 2010.
- Hans Ulrich Obrist, Enrico Castelliani. Gallery Seomi, 2010.
- Hans Ulrich Obrist, Heavy Duty & Razor Sharp: Les Rencontres d’Arles Photography 2010. Actes Sud, 2010.
- Hans Ulrich Obrist, Heinz Mack, Lucio Fontana. Ben Brown Fine Arts, 2010.
- Hans Ulrich Obrist, It Has Only Just Begun: Hans Ulrich Obrist in Conversation with Joseph Grigely and Rirkrit Tiravanija. Printed Matter Inc, 2010.
- Hans Ulrich Obrist, People Meet in Architecture. Now Interviews, Wall of Names, by Kazuyo Sejima, 2010.
- Hans Ulrich Obrist, Popeye Forever (French) and Ever Popeye (English) by Jeff Koons. Galerie Jerome de Noirment, 2010.
- Hans Ulrich Obrist, Soulages Catalogue text. Alfred Pacquement et Pierre Encrevé, Editions du Centre Pompidou, 2010.
- Hans Ulrich Obrist, There is No Inside and Outside Anymore. The View is Immersed: Hans Ulrich Obrist in conversation with Michael von Graffenried. Michael von Graffenried Eye on Africa exhibition, Galerie Esther Woerderhoff, Paris, 2010.
- Hans Ulrich Obrist, This is Our Time. Catalogue 51, Michael Stevenson, 2010.

2001

- Mutations Catalogue. Ed. Hans Ulrich Obrist. Bordeaux: Center for architecture Arc En Rêve, 2001

2000

- Mutations: Sonic City. CD. Ed. Hans Ulrich Obrist. Bordeaux: Center for architecture Arc En Rêve, 2000.

1997

- do it. Curated and Intro. Hans Ulrich Obrist. Copenhagen: Copenhagen Contemporary Art Center, 1997.
- do it. Curated and Intro. Hans Ulrich Obrist. New York: Independent Curators Incorporated, 1997.

1996

- do it. Organized by Hans Ulrich Obrist. Serre di Rapolano: Zerynthia Associazione per l'Arte Contemporanea, 1996.

1993

- The Armoire Show. A catalogue in the form of 10 postcards. Ed. Hans Ulrich Obrist. 1993.

=== Exhibitions curated ===
2011

- Hans Ulrich Obrist and Julia Peyton-Jones, Michelangelo Pistoletto, The Mirror of Judgement. Serpentine Gallery, London, July 12 – September 17.
- Hans Ulrich Obrist and Anton Vidolke, Gustav Metzger. e-flux, New York, April 12 – July 30.
- Hans Ulrich Obrist, Samantha Hardingham and Institute of the 21st Century, Wish We Were Here. Architectural Association, London, March 5–26.
- Hans Ulrich Obrist, Julia Peyton-Jones and Sophie O’Brien, Nancy Spero. Serpentine Gallery, London, March 3 – May 2.
- Hans Ulrich Obrist, Julia Peyton-Jones, Gunnar B. Kvaran, and Thierry Raspail, Indian Highway IV. The Museum of Contemporary Art, Lyon, February 24 – July 31.
- Hans Ulrich Obrist and KHOJ International Artists' Association Lodi, KHOJ Marathon. The Garden Restaurant, Lodi Road New Delhi, India, January 22.
- Hans Ulrich Obrist, Nikolaus Hirsch, Städelschule, Portikus and BHF-BANK-Stiftung, Frankfurt Conversations. Frankfurter Positionen, Frankfurt, Germany, September.

2010

- Hans Ulrich Obrist and Julia Peyton-Jones, Phillipe Parreno. Serpentine Gallery, London, November 25 – February 13 (2011).
- Hans Ulrich Obrist, Julia Peyton-Jones and Gunnar B. Kvaran, China Power Station: Chinese Contemporary Art from the Astrup Fearnley Collection. Fondazione Pinacoteca del Lingotto, Turin, November 7 – February 27 (2011).
- Hans Ulrich Obrist and Nadja Argyropoulou, The Marathon Marathon. The Acropolis, Athens, October 31.
- Hans Ulrich Obrist, Julia Peyton Jones, Nicola Lees, Sally Talent and Lucia Pietroiusti, Serpentine Map Marathon. Serpentine Gallery, London, October 16 –17.
- Hans Ulrich Obrist, Julia Peyton-Jones, Daniel Birnbaum and Sophie O’ Brien, Klara Lidén. Serpentine Gallery, London, October 7 – November 7.
- Hans Ulrich Obrist and Julia Peyton-Jones, Anish Kapoor: Turning the World Upside Down. Royal Parks & Serpentine Gallery, London, September 28 – March 13.
- Hans Ulrich Obrist and Institute of the 21st Century, The Now Interviews. Venice Architectural Biennale, August 29 – November 21.
- Hans Ulrich Obrist and Julia Peyton-Jones, Christian Boltanski: Les archives du cœur. Serpentine Gallery, London, July 10 – August 8.
- Hans Ulrich Obrist and Philippe Parreno, Presented by Hans Ulrich and Philippe Parreno: A sub-selection of Heavy Duty and Razor Sharp. Prix Découverte, Les Rencontres d’Arles, Arles, France, July 3 – September 19.
- Hans Ulrich Obrist and Julia Peyton-Jones, Wolfgang Tillmans. Serpentine Gallery, London, June 26 – September 19.
- Hans Ulrich Obrist and Julia Peyton-Jones, Nairy Baghramian and Phyllida Barlow. Serpentine Gallery, London, May 8 – June 13.
- Hans Ulrich Obrist and Julia Peyton-Jones, Richard Hamilton. Serpentine Gallery, London, March 3 – April 25.

2009

- Hans Ulrich Obrist, Julia Peyton-Jones and Sophie O'Brien, in association with Rebecca Morrill, Gustav Metzger Decades: 1959-2009. Serpentine Gallery, London, September 29-November 8, 2009.
- Hans Ulrich Obrist, Serpentine Gallery Poetry Marathon. The Serpentine Gallery, London, October 17 and 18, 2009.
- Hans Ulrich Obrist, Marina Abramović, and Maria Belshaw, Marina Abramović Presents. The Whitworth Art Gallery at the University of Manchester, Manchester, July 3-July 19, 2009.
- Hans Ulrich Obrist and Julia Peyton-Jones, Jeff Koons: Popeye Series. Serpentine Gallery, London, July 2-September 13, 2009.
- Hans Ulrich Obrist and Philippe Parreno, Il Tempo Del Postino. Theater Basel, Basel, June 10–12, 2009.
- Hans Ulrich Obrist, Julia Peyton-Jones, and Kathryn Rattee, Rebecca Warren. Serpentine Gallery, London, March 10-April 19, 2009.

2008

- Hans Ulrich Obrist, Lu Chunsheng: The materialists are all asleep. Red Mansion Foundation, London, 2008.
- Hans Ulrich Obrist, Julia Peyton-Jones, and Richard Prince, Richard Prince: Continuation. Serpentine Gallery, London, 2008.
- Hans Ulrich Obrist, Julia Peyton-Jones, and Gunnar B. Kvaran, China Power Station, Part III. Serpentine Gallery, London, 2008.
- Hans Ulrich Obrist, Julia Peyton-Jones, and Rebecca Morrill, Gerhard Richter—4900 Colours: Version II. Serpentine Gallery. London, 2008.
- Hans Ulrich Obrist, Moscow on the Move. The Garage Center for Contemporary Culture, Moscow, 2008.
- Hans Ulrich Obrist, Julia Peyton-Jones, Gunnar B. Kvaran, Rebecca Morrill and Leila Hasham, Indian Highway. Serpentine Gallery, London, December 10, 2008 – February 22, 2009.
- Hans Ulrich Obrist, Sally Tallant, and Nicola Lees, Serpentine Gallery Manifesto Marathon 2008. Serpentine Gallery, London, October 18–19, 2008.
- Hans Ulrich Obrist, Mizusawa Tsutomu, et al., Yokohama Triennial. Yokohama, September 13-November 30, 2008.
- Hans Ulrich Obrist, Olafur Eliasson, et al., Experiment Marathon Reykjavik. Reykjavik Art Museum, Reykjavik. Event: May 16–18, 2008. Exhibition: May 15 – September 7, 2008.
- Hans Ulrich Obrist, Julia Peyton-Jones, and Beatrix Ruf. Luke Fowler. Kunsthalle Zürich, August 30-November 2, 2008. Travels to Serpentine Gallery, London, May 7-June 14, 2009.
- Hans Ulrich Obrist and Julia Peyton-Jones, in association with Rebecca Morrill, Maria Lassnig. Serpentine Gallery, London, April 25-June 8, 2008.

2007

- Hans Ulrich Obrist, Julia Peyton Jones, Kitty Scott, and Hafthor Yngvason, Hreinn Fridfinnsson. Serpentine Gallery, London, 2007. Travels to Reykjavik Art Museum, Reykjavik, 2007–2008.
- Hans Ulrich Obrist, Julia Peyton-Jones, and Kitty Scott, Matthew Barney: Drawing Restraint, Vol V, 1987-2007. Serpentine Gallery, London, September 2007-November 2007. Travels to Kunsthalle Vienna, 2008.
- Hans Ulrich Obrist, Gunnar B. Kvaran, and Julia Peyton-Jones, China Power Station, Part II. Astrup Fearnley Museum of Modern Art, Oslo, 2007.
- Hans Ulrich Obrist, Everstill. Casa-Museo Federico Garcia Lorca, Granada, Spain, November 11, 2007 – July 20, 2008.
- Hans Ulrich Obrist and Stéphanie Moisdon, Lyon Biennal—The 00s—the history of a decade that has not yet been named. Lyon, September 19- January 6, 2007.
- Hans Ulrich Obrist, Philippe Parreno, Anri Sala, and Rirkrit Tiravanija, Il Tempo del Postino. Manchester International Festival, Manchester, July 12–14, 2007.
- Hans Ulrich Obrist, Julia Peyton-Jones, and Kitty Scott, Paul Chan: The 7 ~~Lights~~. Serpentine Gallery, London, May 15—July 1, 2007.
- Hans Ulrich Obrist, Joseph Backstein, Daniel Birnbaum, Iara Boubnova, Nicolas Bourriaud, Fulya Erdemci, Gunnar B. Kvaran, and Rosa Martínez, 2nd Moscow Biennale. Moscow, March 1- April 1, 2007.

2006

- Hans Ulrich Obrist, Julia Peyton-Jones, and Gunnar B. Kvaran, China Power Station, Part 1. Battersea Power Station, London. A Serpentine Gallery project in collaboration with the Astrup Fearnley Museum of Modern Art, Oslo, October 8 –November 5, 2006.

2005

- Hans Ulrich Obrist, Daniel Birnbaum, and Gunnar B. Kvaran, Uncertain States of America: American Art in the 3rd Millennium. Astrup Fearnley Museum of Modern Art, Oslo, 2005. Travels to Musée d' Art Moderne de la Ville de Paris, Paris; Center for Curatorial Studies, Bard College, Annandale-on-Hudson, NY; Serpentine Gallery, London, and Reykjavik Art Museum, Reykjavik.
- Hans Ulrich Obrist, Doug Aitken: Ultraworld. Musée d’Art moderne de la Ville de Paris and Couvent des Cordeliers, Paris, November 10 - December 31, 2005.
- Hans Ulrich Obrist, Laurence Bossé, Anne Dressen, and Angeline Scherf, I still believe in miracles, Part II. Musée d’Art moderne de la Ville de Paris, Paris, May 19- June 19, 2005.
- Hans Ulrich Obrist, Laurence Bossé, Anne Dressen, and Angeline Scherf, I still believe in miracles, Part I. Musée d’Art moderne de la Ville de Paris, Paris, April 7-May 7, 2005.
- Hans Ulrich Obrist, Joseph Backstein, Daniel Birnbaum, Iara Boubnova, Nicolas Bourriaud, and Rosa Martinez, 1st Moscow Biennale. Former Lenin Museum, Moscow, January 28-February 28, 2005
- Hans Ulrich Obrist, Water Event. Yoko Ono Horizontal Memories. Astrup Fearnley Museum of Modern Art, Oslo, January 22-May 8, 2005.

2004

- Hans Ulrich Obrist, Nanook Cinema in 6eme Biennale de L'Art Africain Contemporain, DAK'ART 2004. Dakar, Senegal, 2004.
- Hans Ulrich Obrist, Philipp Misselwitz, Philipp Oswalt, and Stefan Rethfeld, Fun Palace Berlin, 200X. Palace of the Republic, Berlin, 2004.
- Hans Ulrich Obrist, Molly Nesbit and Rirkrit Tiravanija, Utopia Station München. Haus der Kunst, Munich, 2004.
- Hans Ulrich Obrist, Laurence Bossé, Angeline Scherrf, Anne Dressen, and Vivian Rehberg, Ailleurs, Ici. Musée d’Art moderne de la Ville de Paris and Couvent des Cordeliers, Paris, 2004.
- Hans Ulrich Obrist, Hou Hanru and Guo Xiaoyan, Second Guangzhou Triennial, Guangdong Museum of Art, Guangzhou, November 18, 2004- January 15, 2006.

2003

- Hans Ulrich Obrist, Molly Nesbit, and Rirkrit Tiravanija, Utopia Station. La Biennale di Venezia, Venice, 2003.
- Hans Ulrich Obrist, Anri Sala, et al., Tirana Biennale 2: U-Topos. Tirana, Albania, 2003.
- Hans Ulrich Obrist, Arata Isozaki: Electric Labyrinth. Castello di Rivoli, Torino, 2003.
- Hans Ulrich Obrist, Nelson Herrara Ysla, Vasif Kortun, Young Chul Lee, Gianfranco Maraniello, and Olu Oguibe, Biennale of Ceramics in Contemporary Art. Savona, Vado Ligure, Albisola Superiore, Albissola Marina, and Ligurian Riviera, Italy, 2003.
- Hans Ulrich Obrist and Vivian Rehberg, Camera. Musée d'Art moderne de la Ville de Paris, Paris, February 7-April 20, 2003.
- Hans Ulrich Obrist, Does Art Bite? Work by Leon Golub. Mednarodni Graficni Likovni Center, Ljubljana, January–March, 2003.

2002

- Hans Ulrich Obrist, Lynne Cooke, Chris Dercon, and Robert Fleck, ForwArt 2002. Various locations throughout Brussels, including the BBL Cultural Centre, Place Royale Konigsplein, the Royal Museums of Fine Arts of Belgium, the Royal Library of Belgium, the Palais des Beaux-Arts, and the Palais des Congrès, 2002.
- Hans Ulrich Obrist, Laurence Bossé, and Julia Garimorth, Urgent Painting. Musée d’Art moderne de la Ville de Paris, Paris, 2002.
- Hans Ulrich Obrist, el aire es azul (the air is blue). Casa Museo Luis Barragán, Mexico City, México, November 2, 2002- March 3, 2003.
- Hans Ulrich Obrist, Peter Weibel, Bruno Latour, Peter Galison, Dario Gamboni, Joseph Leo Koerner, and Adam Lowe, Iconoclash. ZKM, Karlsruhe, May 4- August 4, 2002.

2001

- Hans Ulrich Obrist and Laurence Bossé, Traversées (Crossings). Musée d’Art moderne de la Ville de Paris, Paris, 2001.
- Hans Ulrich Obrist and Gregor Podnar, Information – Misinformation. Ljubljana Graphic Biennale, Ljubljana, 2001.
- Hans Ulrich Obrist, Cedric Price: Drawings. Institute for International Visual Art, London, 2001.
- Hans Ulrich Obrist, Mutations: Sonic City, Rumor City. Tokyo Version. TN Probe Tokyo, 2001.
- Hans Ulrich Obrist, DO IT. Museo de arte Carrillo Gil, Mexico City, 14 November 2001 – 10 February 2002.
- Hans Ulrich Obrist and Akiko Miyake, Bridge the Gap, A conference, exhibition, and gathering. Center for Contemporary Art, Kitakyushu, July 24–27, 2001.

2000

- Hans Ulrich Obrist, City Vision/Clip City. An exhibition on large scale electronic billboards. Media_city, Seoul, 2000.
- Hans Ulrich Obrist, Urban Rumours. Fri-Art, Fribourg, 2000.
- Hans Ulrich Obrist, Laurence Bossé and Carolyn Christov-Bakargiev, La Ville, Le Jardin, La Mémoire. Académie de France à Rome, Villa Médicis, 2000.
- Hans Ulrich Obrist, Rem Koolhaas, Stefano Boeri, and Sanford Kwinter, Mutations. Arc en reve, centre d'architecture, Bordeaux, November 24, 2000- March 25, 2003.
- Hans Ulrich Obrist, Suzanne Pagé, Béatrice Parent, et al., Voilà: le monde dans la tete. Musée d'Art moderne de la Ville de Paris, Paris, June 15- October 29, 2000.

1999

- Hans Ulrich Obrist, Laurence Bossé and Carolyn Christov-Bakargiev, La Ville, Le Jardin, La Mémoire. Académie de France à Rome, Villa Médicis, 1999.
- Hans Ulrich Obrist and Laurence Bossé, Nuit Blanche—Nordic Video Tour. Organized by the Nordic Institute for Contemporary Art, Helsinki, 1999.
- Hans Ulrich Obrist, Retrace Your Steps: Remember Tomorrow. Sir John Soane's Museum, London, December 10, 1999- March 25, 2000.
- Hans Ulrich Obrist and Barbara Vanderlinden, Laboratorium. Provinciaal Museum voor Fotografie and different locations in the city of Antwerp, June 27- October 3, 1999.

1998

- Hans Ulrich Obrist, Archipelag TV. A series of one-minute videos produced for Swedish Television as part of the exhibition Archipelag itself a series of approximately 40 exhibitions organized as part of the Cultural Capital of Europe program in Stockholm, 1998.
- Hans Ulrich Obrist, Laurence Bossé, and Carolyn Christov-Bakargiev, La Ville, Le Jardin, La Mémoire. Académie de France à Rome, Villa Médicis, 1998.
- Hans Ulrich Obrist, Kara Walker, Safety Curtain, 1998/99. museum in progress in cooperation with the Vienna State Opera, Vienna, 1998.
- Hans Ulrich Obrist and Laurence Bossé, Nuit Blanche. Musée d’Art moderne de la Ville de Paris, Paris, February 8- May 10, 1998.

1997

- Hans Ulrich Obrist, DO IT. North American tour comprising multiple venues, organized by Independent Curators International, New York, 1997–present.
- Hans Ulrich Obrist and Hou Hanru, Cities on the Move. Secession, Vienna, November 26, 1997- January 18, 1998. Travels to CAPC, Bordeaux, June 5- August 30, 1998; PS 1, New York, October 18, 1998- January 10, 1999; Louisiana Museum of Modern Art, Humlebaek, January 29- April 21, 1999; Hayward Gallery, London, May 13- June 27, 1999; Bangkok with Thomas Nordanstad and Ole Scheeren, October 9–30, 1999; Kiasma Museum Helsinki, November 5- December 19, 1999.
- Hans Ulrich Obrist, Sarat Maharaj, and Gillian Wearing, Beck's New Contemporaries 97. Cornerhouse Manchester, May 31- July 20, 1997, Camden Arts Center, London, August 1- September 21, 1997, cca Glasgow, December 12, 1997- January 31, 1998.
- Hans Ulrich Obrist, Point d’ironie, A serial publication/exhibition edited/curated 1997–present:

Pilot issue: Jonas Mekas (May 1997) 1. Joseph Grigely (June 1997) special issue: Christian Boltanski for James Lee Byars (September 1997) 2. Gilbert & George (October 1997) 3. Douglas Gordon (November 1997) 4. Marlene Streeruwitz (February 1998) 5. Annette Messager (April 1998) 6. Lawrence Weiner (May 1998) 7. Christian Boltanski (July 1998) 8. Itsuko Hasegawa & Dan Graham (September 1998) 9. Gabriel Orozco (December 1998) 10. Claude Lévêque (January 1999) 11. Hans-Peter Feldmann (March 1999) special issue: Martin Parr (April 1999) 12. Harmony Korine (May 1998) 13. Antoinette Ohannessian & Toni Negri (July 1999) 14. Louise Bourgeois (October 1999) special issue 2000: Frédéric Bruly Bouabré (January 2000) 15. Roni Horn (February 2000) 16. Richard Billingham (May 2000) 17. John Giorno & Ugo Rondinone (October 2000) 18. Rosmarie Trockel (December 2000) 19. Cédric Price (February 2001) 20. Ken Lum, hommage à Chen Zhen (March 2001) 21. Raymond Hains (July 2001) 22. Gilbert & George (September 2001) 23. Thomas Hirschhorn (October 2001) 24. Yona Friedman (December 2001) special issue: Navin Rawanchaikul (January 2002) 25. Matthew Barney (June 2002) 26. Christian Boltanski (June 2002) 27. Hanne Darboven (June 2002) 28. Raqs Media Collective (June 2002) 29. Edouard Glissant (November 2002) 30. Claude Closky (June 2003) 31. Yoko Ono (December 2003) 32. Paul-Armand Gette (January 2004) 32. special issue: bis Hors série (January 2004) 33. Philippe Parreno (April 2004) 34. Michel Foucault (September 2004) 35. Yona Friedman (October 2004) Special issue: Nancy Spero (April 2005) 36. Tacita Dean (May 2005) 37. Ed Ruscha (June 2005) 38. Ryan McGuinness (January 2006) 39. Richard Prince (April 2006) 40. Damien Hirst (September 2006) 41. hommage à Raymond Hains (November 2006) 42. Tobias Buche (January 2007) 43. Hreinn Fridfinnsson (August 2007) 44. Hugues Reip & Melanie Counsell (July 2008) 45. Robert Crumb (October 2008) 46. Carlos Cruz-Diez (December 2008) 47. Koo Jeong-A (April 2009) 48. Walid Raad (July 2009) 49. Ryan McGinley (December 2009) Special issue: Stéphane Hessel and Pascal Lemaître (May 2010) 50. Christian Boltanski (September 2010) Special issue: Pierre Reimer (December 2010) 51. Dayanita Singh (December 2010)

1996

- Hans Ulrich Obrist, Peter Kogler. Deutsches Museum Bonn, Bonn, 1996.
- Hans Ulrich Obrist and Stella Rollig, Travelling Eye. museum in progress, Vienna, 1996.
- Hans Ulrich Obrist and Carolyn Christov-Bakargiev, Uccelli / Birds. Zerynthia, Paliano-Rome, 1996.
- Hans Ulrich Obrist, Christian Boltanski. University Lüneburg, Lüneburg, 1996.
- Hans Ulrich Obrist and Laurence Bossé, Life/Live. Musée d’Art moderne de la Ville de Paris, Paris, October 5, 1996 – January 5, 1997. Travels to Centro Cultural de Belém, Lisbon, January 23 –April 21, 1997.
- Hans Ulrich Obrist, Rosa Martínez, Viktor Misiano, Katalin Néray, and Andrew Renton, Manifesta 1. Kunsthall Rotterdam, Natural History Museum, Rotterdam, and 10 other institutions in Rotterdam, June 9- August 19, 1996.
- Hans Ulrich Obrist, Mückenbus: Rosemarie Trockel and Carsten Höller. Deutsches Museum Bonn, Bonn, 1996.

1995

- Hans Ulrich Obrist, Koo Jeong-a, lovely loisir. Apartment exhibition, 86 Crampton Street, London, 1995.
- Hans Ulrich Obrist and Ernst Pöppel, Art & Brain. Akademie zum dritten Jahrtausend, Forschungzentrum Jülich, 1995.
- Hans Ulrich Obrist, Fabrice Hybert. University Lüneburg in collaboration with the Musée d’Art Moderne de la Ville de Paris, Paris, 1995.
- Hans Ulrich Obrist, Take me (I'm yours). Serpentine Gallery, London, March 24-April 30, 1995 and Kunsthalle Nürnberg, July 27-September 17, 1995.

1994

- Hans Ulrich Obrist, Nano Museum. An ongoing series of exhibitions, 1994-1998 (the initial series ceased when Douglas Gordon lost the museum in a bar in Glasgow); resumed 2000–2003; resumed again, 2010.
- Hans Ulrich Obrist, Vital Use. museum in progress and Der Standard, Vienna, 1994.
- Hans Ulrich Obrist, Cloaca Maxima. Museum der Stadtentwässerung, Zürich, June 10 – October 30, 1994.

1993

- Hans Ulrich Obrist, Cieli ad Alta Quota. Airline Project by Alighiero Boetti. museum in progress in conjunction with Austrian Airlines, Vienna, 1993.
- Hans Ulrich Obrist, Hotel Carlton Palace: Chambre 763. Hotel Carlton Palace, Paris, 1993.
- Hans Ulrich Obrist, The Armoire Show. 80th birthday of the Armory Show 1913–1993. Presented as part of Hotel Carlton Palace: Chambre 763. Hotel Carlton Palace, Paris, 1993.
- Hans Ulrich Obrist and Kasper König, Paris-Hamburg-Frankfurt: Neue Kunst in Hamburg. Kunstverein, Hamburg, November 19, 1993- January 9, 1994.
- Hans Ulrich Obrist and Kasper König, The Broken Mirror. Der Zerbrochene Spiegel, Kunsthalle Wien, May 26-July 25, 1993 and Deichtorhallen, Hamburg, October 14, 1993 – January 2, 1994.
- Hans Ulrich Obrist, Migrateurs. A series of exhibitions at the Musée d’Art Moderne de la Ville de Paris, Paris, 1993-2003:

1992

- Hans Ulrich Obrist, Christian Boltanski: Book. Stiftsbibliothek, Monastery Library, St. Gallen, 1992.
- Hans Ulrich Obrist, Hans-Peter Feldmann Retrospective. Musée d’Art Moderne de la Ville de Paris, Paris, 1992.
- Hans Ulrich Obrist, Gerhard Richter: SILS. Nietzsche House, Sils Maria, 1992.
- Hans Ulrich Obrist, Paul-Armand Gette: Furkapas & Glacier du Rhone, Centre Culturel Suisse, Paris, November 13, 1992- January 17, 1993.
- Hans Ulrich Obrist and Laurence Bossé, Qui, Quoi, Où? Un regard sur l’art en Allemagne en 1992. The Musée d’Art Moderne de la Ville de Paris, Paris, October 22, 1992 – January 17, 1993.
- Hans Ulrich Obrist, Bice Curiger and Bernard Marcadé, Oh! cet écho! Centre Culturel Suisse, Paris, September 19 – November 1, 1992.
- Hans Ulrich Obrist, Robert Walser Museum, Part I. Hotel Krone Gais, Appenzell, May 1992.

1991

- Hans Ulrich Obrist, Kitchen Show. Schwalbenstrasse 10, St. Gallen, July–September, 1991.
