= Obrist =

Obrist is a surname. Notable people with the surname include:

- Christian Obrist (born 1980), Italian middle-distance runner
- Christine Egerszegi-Obris (born 1948), Swiss politician
- Dan Obrist (born 1946), American racing driver
- Franz Obrist, Italian luger
- Hans-Ulrich Obrist (born 1968), Swiss curator, critic and historian of art
- Hermann Obrist (1862–1927), German sculptor of the Jugendstil
- Robert Obrist (1958–2025), Swiss politician

See also

- Hans-Ulrich Obrist bibliography, bibliography for Hans-Ulrich Obrist
