= Von hier aus – Zwei Monate neue deutsche Kunst in Düsseldorf =

Coordinates: 51.2634°N 6.7456°E

Von hier aus – Zwei Monate neue deutsche Kunst in Düsseldorf (Up from here – Two months of new German art in Düsseldorf) is the title of an art exhibition from 29 September 1984 to 2 December 1984. It was organised by the city of Düsseldorf and the Gesellschaft für aktuelle Kunst Düsseldorf e.V. and was curated by Kasper König.

The exhibition showed the best of Contemporary German Art and wrote art history. The venue was Hall 13 of the Messe Düsseldorf, designed by the Austrian architect Hermann Czech. The green neon lettering used for the exhibition "Von hier aus" bore the handwriting of Joseph Beuys.

== Participants ==
- Marina Abramović (Video)
- Ina Barfuss
- Georg Baselitz
- Lothar Baumgarten
- Thomas Bayrle
- Bernd and Hilla Becher
- Joseph Beuys
- Bernhard Johannes Blume
- Jürgen Bordanowicz
- George Brecht
- Marcel Broodthaers
- Klaus vom Bruch (Video)
- Werner Büttner
- Holger Bunk
- Walter Dahn
- Hanne Darboven
- Jiří Georg Dokoupil
- Gerald Domenig
- Felix Droese
- Rainer Fetting
- Robert Filliou
- Lili Fischer
- Günther Förg
- Katharina Fritsch
- Nikolaus Gerhart
- Ludwig Gosewitz
- Hans Haacke
- Eva Hesse
- Antonius Höckelmann
- Rebecca Horn
- Thomas Huber
- Jörg Immendorff
- Katja Ka
- Axel Kasseböhmer
- Gerard Kever
- Hubert Kiecol
- Anselm Kiefer
- Martin Kippenberger
- Per Kirkeby
- Astrid Klein
- Arthur Köpcke
- Imi Knoebel
- Thomas Lange
- Silke Leverkühne
- Markus Lüpertz
- Peter Mell
- Gerhard Merz
- Olaf Metzel
- Reinhard Mucha
- Christa Näher
- Group Normal (Peter Angermann, Jan Knap, Milan Kunc)
- Marcel Odenbach (Video)
- Albert Oehlen
- Markus Oehlen
- Nam June Paik
- Blinky Palermo
- A. R. Penck
- Sigmar Polke
- Gerhard Richter
- Dieter Roth
- Reiner Ruthenbeck
- Ulrich Rückriem
- Salomé
- Tomas Schmit
- Thomas Schütte
- Andreas Schulze
- Manfred Stumpf
- Norbert Tadeusz
- Herman de Vries
- Thomas Wachweger
- Andy Warhol

== Literature ==
- Kasper König (publ.) and Karin Thomas (edit.), Ulrich Look and others (texts): von hier aus – Zwei Monate neue deutsche Kunst in Düsseldorf. Exhibition catalogue, DuMont, Cologne 1984, ISBN 3-7701-1650-X (472 pages).
- Ereignis im Niveau von Westkunst und Zeitgeist. In: Art Magazin. 10/1983 (Szeemann planned as head).
- von hier aus Rekord Versuch in Halle 13. In: Art Magazin. 10/1984 (construction report).
- Die Kunst-Landschaft im Container. In: Art Magazin. 11/1984 (22.000 visitors in the first few days).
- Deutsche Kunst – schamlos, nationalistisch und nazihaft? In: Art Magazin. 2/1985 (criticism from a French cultural official).
- Kraftakt mit Deutschkunst. In: Westermanns Monatshefte. 12/1984, S. 108.
- Düsseldorf: "von hier aus" – Zeitgenössische deutsche Kunst. In: PAN – Unsere herrliche Welt., publisher: Burda. 11/1984, p. 80–86.

== Film ==
The exhibition inspired the filmmaker Peter Herrmann to the video film "Von hier aus: neue deutsche Kunst in Düsseldorf", 45 Minutes, Munich, 1984, Artcom. The Film contains interviews with the artists Bernhard Johannes Blume, Tomas Schmit, Joseph Beuys, Jörg Immendorff, Salomé, Dieter Roth and the curator Kasper König.
