= Domenig =

Domenig is a surname. Notable people with the surname include:

- Aya Domenig (born 1972), Japanese filmmaker and anthropologist
- Gerald Domenig (born 1953), Austrian artist
- Günther Domenig (1934–2012), Austrian architect
