= Group Normal =

German Czech group of artists formed in 1979

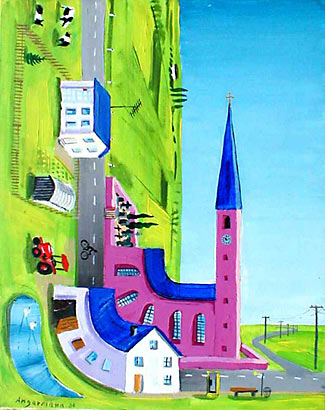
Peter Angermann: 90° village, 1984, Hessisches Landesmuseum Darmstadt

Group Normal is a German Czech group of artists formed in 1979.

It consists of the artists Peter Angermann, Jan Knap, and Milan Kunc, who met in the early 1970s at Kunstakademie Düsseldorf in the classes of Joseph Beuys and Gerhard Richter. They championed the rejection of individualism and, in line with this, created a large number of joint works – paintings that in some cases were done in public. The declared ambition of the three artists was to overcome the predominating and elitist “academic avantgardism” by an art as demystified and accessible as possible.

== Exhibitions ==
- 1980 11e Biennale de Paris, Musee d'Art Moderne
- 1980 The Times Square Show, Colab, New York
- 1980 Apres le Classicisme, Musee d'Art et de l'Industrie, St. Etienne
- 1981 Rundschau Deutschland, Munich
- 1981 Gruppe Normal, Neue Galerie / Sammlung Ludwig, Aachen
- 1984 Von hier aus – Zwei Monate neue deutsche Kunst in Düsseldorf (From here – Two months of new German art in Düsseldorf)
- 1984 Tiefe Blicke, Hessisches Landesmuseums, Darmstadt
- 2005 "Prague Biennale 2, Prague
- 2005 Normal Group, MACI Museo Arte Contemporanea Isernia, Italy
- 2007 Normal Group, Trevi Flash Art Museum, Palazzo Lucarni, Italy
- 2015 The 80s. Figurative Painting in West Germany, Städel Museum, Frankfurt am Main
- 2016 Die Neuen Wilden, Groninger Museum
- 2018 Libres Figurations au FHEL de Landereau
