= Museum in progress =

Austrian art association

museum in progress (mip)
- Founded: 1990
- Founder: Kathrin Messner; Josef Ortner († 2009)
- Type: Art association
- Location: Vienna, Austria
- Website: www.mip.at

museum in progress is a private art association based in Vienna. The non-profit art initiative was created in 1990 by Kathrin Messner and Josef Ortner († 2009) with the aim to develop new presentation forms for contemporary art. The projects are implemented in each case on the basis of co-operation between economy, art and media.

== Exhibition activity ==
The exhibition activity of museum in progress concentrates on media and public spaces. For example, newspapers, magazines, billboards, building fronts, television and internet are used. The works of art exhibited by museum in progress are specifically created for the medium, dependent on the context, and temporary.

This working technique enables museum in progress to overcome the distance between everyday life and places of art as well as to reach a far larger public than traditional museums.

== Projects ==
- Art, Society and Media (1994–1996): Symposium with artists, art critics, philosophers and essayists about art, media and the social reality of the 1990s. Contributions were published in Der Standard. Participants: Jean Baudrillard, Pierre Bourdieu, Gilles Deleuze, Carsten Höller, Kasper König, Otto Mühl, Hans-Ulrich Obrist, Paul Virilio, et al.
- Billboard (1991–2001): The billboards created by artists were shown in each case on approx. 3000 billboards in Vienna for two months. Participating artists: Jeremy Deller, Hans-Peter Feldmann, Felix Gonzalez-Torres, Gerwald Rockenschaub, Rirkrit Tiravanija, Rosemarie Trockel, et al.
- DO IT – TV-Version (1995–1996): The cultural show "10 1/2" of the Austrian broadcast (ORF) weekly presented one to three minute video-clips with "instructions for action", created by international artists. Participants: Leon Golub, Damien Hirst, Ilya Kabakov, Yoko Ono, Michelangelo Pistoletto, Erwin Wurm, et al.
- Portraits of Artists (1992–2001): A discussion series on video with artists, following an artistic concept of Peter Kogler. Participants: Vito Acconci, Georg Baselitz, Günter Brus, Gilbert & George, Jenny Holzer, Hermann Nitsch, Arnulf Rainer, James Rosenquist, Lawrence Weiner, Christopher Wool, Heimo Zobernig, et al. In 2017 some of these conversations were published on DVD by Verlag der Buchhandlung Walther König under the title Artists Talking.
- raising flags (since 2023): The ongoing project raising flags by museum in progress has been realised at various locations since 2023, including virtual exhibition spaces online as well as media spaces in newspapers and magazines. In addition to Vienna, the flag project was presented in Ladakh, Cēsis, Bad Gastein, Paris and Ahungalla. Participating artists: Ghada Amer, Mounir Fatmi, Shilpa Gupta, Wade Guyton, Agnieszka Kurant, Jonathan Monk, Maurizio Nannucci, Laure Prouvost, Erwin Wurm, et al.
- Safety Curtain (since 1998): The exhibition series in the Vienna State Opera transforms the fire wall between stage and auditorium into a temporary showroom for contemporary art. Participating artists: El Anatsui, Tauba Auerbach, John Baldessari, Matthew Barney, Richard Hamilton, David Hockney, Joan Jonas, Anselm Kiefer, Jeff Koons, Maria Lassnig, Cy Twombly, Kara Walker et al.
- Travelling Eye (1995–1996): An exhibition project in the news magazine profil. Participants: John Baldessari, Nan Goldin, Gabriel Orozco, Gerhard Richter, et al.
- With an Open Mind – Tolerance and Diversity (2002): Twelve full-page artistic interventions in the daily papers Der Standard and Süddeutsche Zeitung. Participating artists: Thomas Bayrle, Tacita Dean, Douglas Gordon, Ken Lum, et al.
- Woman/War/Victimage/Resistance (1994–1995): A work in six-parts, which deals with the insufficiently examined Austrian National Socialist past, in particular with the roles of perpetrator and victim. The exhibition series of Nancy Spero was published in Der Standard.

== Bibliography ==
- Daniel Birnbaum, Hans-Ulrich Obrist: Museums on the Move, in: Artforum, summer 2010, pp. 301–306.
- Kim Conaty: museum in progress, in Print/Out, on the occasion of the exhibition from February until May 2012 in Museum of Modern Art, New York, 2012, pp. 70–79.
- Galleria Continua: Speed & Slowness. Deimantas Narkevicius, Michelangelo Pistoletto, Jeff Preiss and museum in progress, Prato: Gli Ori, 2003.
- Alois Herrmann, Kaspar Mühlemann Hartl (Hrsg.): raising flags – Signals of Art in Public Spaces, 2 vol., Cologne: Verlag der Buchhandlung Walther & Franz König, 2025.
- Edelbert Köb (Publisher): KünstlerInnen. 50 Gespräche. 50 Positionen zeitgenössischer internationaler Kunst. Videoportraits und Werke, for the exhibition from 28-09 – 30-11-1997 in Kunsthaus Bregenz, Cologne: Verlag der Buchhandlung Walther König, 1997.
- Margarethe Makovec, Anton Lederer (Ed.): Balkan Konsulat, for the exhibition from October 2002 to November 2003, Frankfurt on the Main: Revolver, 2006.
- Kaspar Mühlemann Hartl, museum in progress; Dominique Meyer, Wiener Staatsoper (Ed.): CURTAIN – VORHANG. A Living Museum Space – The Vienna State Opera Safety Curtain, Vienna: Verlag für moderne Kunst 2017.
- Kaspar Mühlemann Hartl, Alois Herrmann (Hrsg.): Art in public spaces and in media – IN ONE END & OUT THE OTHER [ & THEN AGAIN ], museum in progress, Cologne: Verlag der Buchhandlung Walther und Franz König, 2021.
- museum in progress (Publisher): Modularer Katalog – 10 Jahre museum in progress, 3 vol., Vienna, 2000.
- Gregor Auenhammer: Nicht auf die Größe kommt es an. Großartiges und Unvermutetes aus Österreich. Vienna: Metroverlag, 2013, pp. 56–58.
- Cathrin Pichler, Roman Berka (Publisher): TransAct. Transnational Activities in the Cultural Field. Interventionen zur Lage in Österreich. museum in progress, Edition Transfer, Vienna, New York: Springer, 2010.
- Stella Rollig (Publisher): Reise zu den Quellen, 2 vol., Vienna, 1994.
- Johannes Schlebrügge (Publisher): Safety Curtain 1. Kara Walker, published by museum in progress in co-operation with Vienna State Opera, Vienna: P & S, 2000.
- Johannes Schlebrügge (Publisher): Safety Curtain 2. Christine & Irene Hohenbüchler, published by museum in progress in co-operation with Vienna State Opera, Vienna: P & S, 2001.
- Vienna Chamber of Labour, museum in progress (Ed.): Arbeitswelten / Worlds of Work, Vienna, 2005.
- Vienna Chamber of Labour, Roman Berka (Ed.): Kunst – Arbeit – Gesellschaft, Vienna, 2016, pp. 68–79.
- Tobias Wall: Das unmögliche Museum. Zum Verhältnis von Kunst und Kunstmuseen der Gegenwart, Bielefeld: transcript, 2006, pp. 264–269.
- Vitus H. Weh: museum in progress, in: Museum der Wünsche [Museum of Desires], on the occasion of the exhibition from 10 September 2011 until 8 January 2012 in Museum Moderner Kunst Stiftung Ludwig Wien, Vienna: distanz 2011, pp. 129–132.
- Deborah Wye, Wendy Weitman: Eye on Europe. Prints, Books & Multiples / 1960 to Now, on the occasion of the exhibition from 15 October 2006 until 1 January 2007 in Museum of Modern Art, New York, 2006, pp. 173, 180, 212–213, 280.
