= Peter Angermann =

German painter (born 1945)

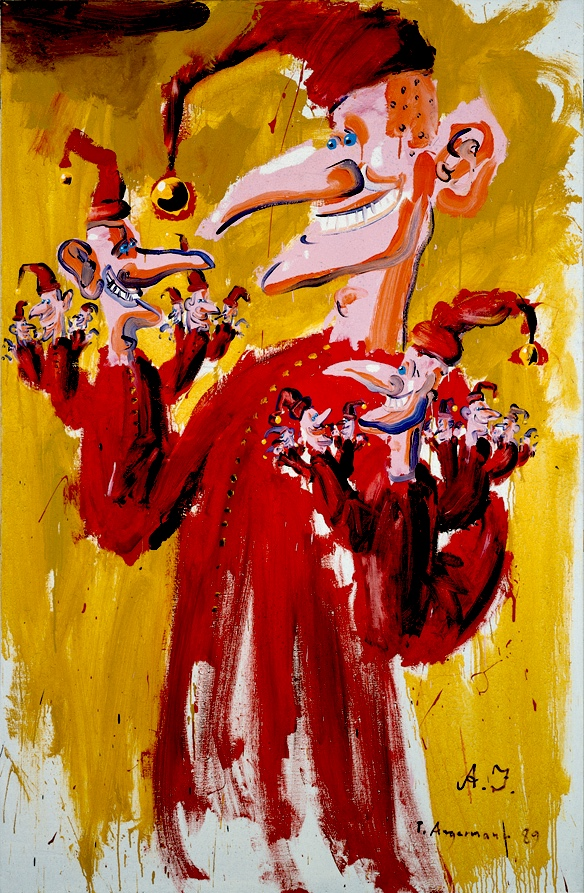
Artificial Intelligence – Nohandsfractal

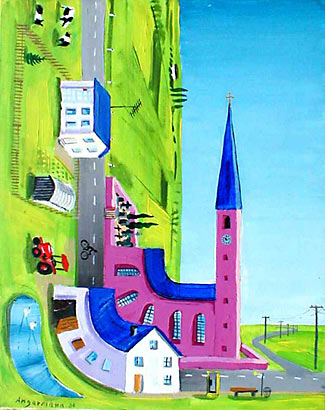
"90°village" Peter Angermann 1984

Peter Angermann (born 1945 in Rehau, Bavaria) is a German painter based in Nuremberg.

== Education and career ==
Initially, from 1966 to 1968, Peter Angermann, who was born in 1945 in Rehau, a small town in Upper Franconia in Bavaria, studied at the Academy of Fine Arts, Nuremberg, Then, in autumn 1968, he was drawn to the class run by Joseph Beuys at the Kunstakademie Düsseldorf. Constantly showered with his teacher's praise, he nevertheless – or perhaps precisely for that reason – became co-founder of the legendary YIUP group, which from 1969 on attracted attention inside the academy, and above all in the Beuys class, through provocative actions that were directed even against Beuys himself. On leaving the academy in 1972, Angermann saw that in artistic terms, he had come away empty-handed; his passion for painting had not exactly been fostered by Beuys. Not until a year later, once he had largely jettisoned Beuys's ideas, did Angermann make a new start in the field of painting. A meeting with his former classmate Milan Kunc proved exceptionally fruitful in this situation. Together they developed a new visual language that was closely oriented to everyday life, while simultaneously being fired by a witty, anarchic impulse. In 1979 Jan Knap joined the two friends, and group NORMAL was born. They championed the rejection of individualism and, in line with this, created a large number of joint works – paintings that in some cases were done in public. By 1981, however, each of the three members had progressed so far in his own artistic development that it was decided to disband the group. Standing now on his own two feet, Peter Angermann has retained the socio-critical impulse from his earlier works – coupled with that provocative and at times absurdist humour that marks many of his paintings to this day. In 1976 he surprised the world with the first of his "bear paintings" and what was to be the beginning of a series that has kept on expanding. In fact, these are paintings of family life, which, while sharpening our eye for the human condition under the strict use of the bear guise, do not baulk at depicting idylls. Ten years later Angermann pulled another surprise out of the hat – at first through the sheer joy of exploring a genre which at that time was frowned on: en plein air painting. In the meantime, this group of works has found a permanent place in his oeuvre and has led him to discover a virtuosity as colourist that also distinguishes his mature, themed works. The two of them – his themed works and his landscapes – alternate without more ado in Angermann's work, and it is this liaison that makes Angermann so unique in today's art scene. Parallel to this, Peter Angermann has also passed his artistic experience on to a new generation of artists, at first through guest professorships at Reykjavík and Kassel, followed from 1996 to 2002 by a professorship at the Städelschule in Frankfurt am Main, and then from 2002 to 2010 at the Academy of Fine Arts, Nuremberg. In 1995, Angermann made his home one hour's car drive away from Nuremberg, in Thurndorf, where, far removed from the turmoil of the art business, he continues to dedicate himself enthusiastically to the medium that holds every possibility of artistic development open to him: painting.

== Exhibitions ==
- 1980 "11. Biennale des Jeunes", Musee d'Art Moderne, Paris
- 1980 "The Times Square Show", Colab, NYC
- 1984 "Von hier aus – Zwei Monate neue deutsche Kunst in Düsseldorf"
- 1986 "Peter Angermann", Living Art Museum, Reykjavik
- 1992 "Peter Angermann: Stehender Verkehr ", Kasseler Kunstverein, Germany
- 1995 "Peter Angermann", Kunsthalle Nürnberg
- 1995 "Salut au Monde", Fries Museum, Leeuwarden
- 2002 "German Landscapes", SA National Gallery in Cape Town
- 2004 "La boite en valise" – Academy of Fine Arts Prague
- 2005 "Group Normal", Prague Biennale 2, Carlin Hall, Prague
- 2005 "Normal Group", MACI Museo Arte Contemporanea Isernia, Italy
- 2007 "Normal Group", Trevi Flash Art Museum, Palazzo Lucarni, Italy
- 2008 "To be a teacher is my greatest work of art" – Kunstmuseum Ahlen, Germany
- 2009 "Joseph Beuys and His Students ", Sakip Sabanci Müzesi, Istanbul
- 2009 "Peter Angermann – Autonomoney", Museen der Stadt Bamberg, Germany
- 2010 "Peter Angermann", Daegu MBC, Gallery M, Korea
- 2013 "Peter Angermann – Licht am Horizont", Museum Haus Lange, Krefeld, Germany
- 2014 "Peter Angermann – Die Lust am Sehen", Neues Museum Nürnberg, Germany
- 2014 "Peter Angermann: Zpátky k umění", Galerie města Plzně
- 2014 "Streetview", GAVU Cheb
- 2014 "Wild Heart: German Neo-Expressionism Since the 1960s", China Art Museum, Shanghai
- 2015 "The 80s, Figurative Painting in West Germany", Städel Museum Frankfurt am Main
- 2018 "Peter Angermann – PleinAir", Nuremberg, Germany
- 2019 "Plein Air Kirchen", Luftmuseum, Amberg
- 2021 "YIUP", Overbeck-Gesellschaft – Kunstverein Lübeck

== Public collections ==
- Städel Museum, Frankfurt am Main
- Germanisches Nationalmuseum
- Bavarian State Picture Collections
- Hessisches Landesmuseum Darmstadt
- Deutsches Historisches Museum
- MACI Museo Arte Contemporanea Isernia
- National Gallery of Iceland, Safn, Reykjavik
- Neues Museum Nürnberg
- MMK Frankfurt am Main
- Centraal Museum, Utrecht
- Groninger Museum
- Trevi Flash Art Museum di Arte Contemporanea
- Glasgow Museums, Glasgow
- Galleria d'Arte Moderna e Contemporanea, San Marino
- Staatliche Kaliningrader Kunstgalerie
- Abteiberg Museum, Mönchengladbach
- Museum Ostwall, Dortmund
- Kunstmuseen Krefeld
- Muzeum moderního umění Olomouc
- Johnson Museum of Art, Ithaca NY
- Luftmuseum, Amberg

== See also ==
- List of German painters

== Sources ==
- Julian Spalding (2010) "The Best Art You've Never Seen". ISBN 978-1-84836-271-0
- Ursula Peters "Vom Ansehen der Tiere" Germanisches Nationalmuseum 2009. ISBN 978-3-936688-38-2
- Landesmuseum für Kunst und Kulturgeschichte Oldenburg "100 Jahre, 100 Bilder" Merlin Verlag 2009 ISBN 978-3-87536-272-5
- Luca Beatrice (2006) "Normal Group" Giancarlo Politi Editore ISBN 88-7816-138-1
- Luca Beatrice (2005) "PragueBiennale2".
- Peter Angermann (2001) "pleinair". Verlag für Moderne Kunst Nürnberg. ISBN 978-3-933096-57-9
- Karl Schawelka "Peter Angermann: Malerei 1973 bis 1995" Verlag für Moderne Kunst Nürnberg. ISBN 3-928342-45-2
- Stephan Schmidt-Wulffen "Tiefe Blicke" DuMont 1985. ISBN 3-7701-1740-9
- Kasper König (1984) "von hier aus" DuMont 1984. ISBN 3-7701-1650-X
