= Manfred Stumpf =

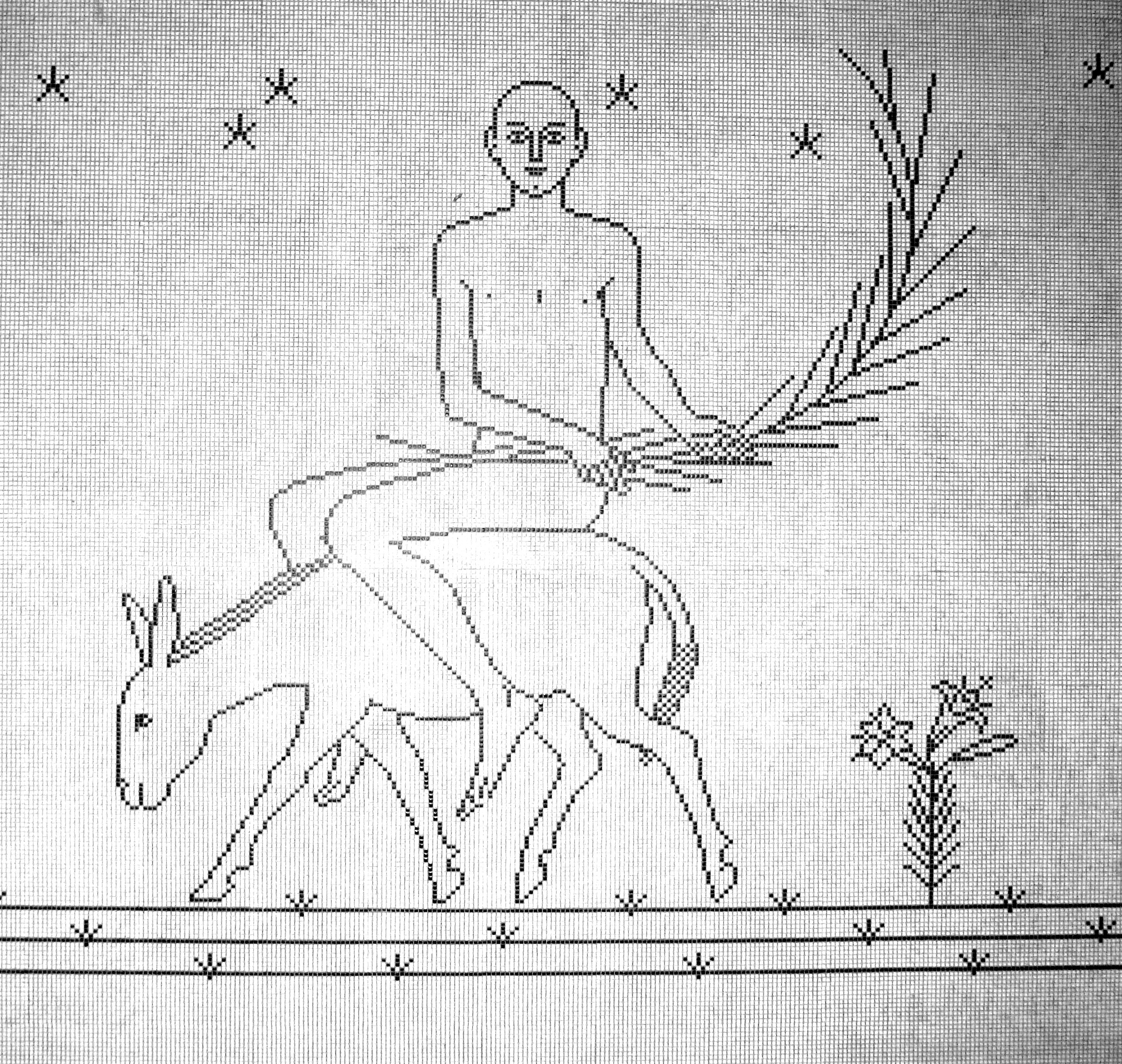
- Mosaic at Habsburgerallee (Underground station), Frankfurt am Main, 2010
- Born: November 25, 1957 (age 68); Alsfeld, West Germany
- Education: Städelschule
- Known for: Sculpture, Drawing
- Notable work: Entry into Jerusalem, 1986
- Movement: Contemporary art
- Awards: Reinhold Kurt-Kunstpreis der Frankfurter Sparkasse, Marielies Hess-Kunstpreis

Manfred Stumpf (born November 25, 1957, in Alsfeld, Hesse) is a German draftsman, conceptual artist, and digital artist. He started to study 1976 with Thomas Bayrle at the Städelschule in Frankfurt am Main, since 1978 with Hans Haake at the Cooper Union in New York, and since 1979 with Bazon Brock at the University of Applied Arts in Vienna, Austria. He currently resides in Romrod in the Vogelsbergkreis and Frankfurt, Germany.

From 1995 until 2024, Stumpf has been professor for figure drawing and conceptual drawing at the faculty of arts and was leading interdisciplinary projects with Prof. Dieter Mankau at the HfG Offenbach.

== Works ==
"Searching for a mandatory, symbolic visual depiction, Stumpf discovered early Christianity and the Byzantine Art. He uses these conventionalized symbols for his art and fills them with actual topics."

Stumpf's developed icon "Entry into Jerusalem" (1986) emerged from there and has been sent—during the project "Contempler"—in a container around the world and is still varied by him until today.

Right from the start, Stumpf used the technical pen Rotring to work on his clear, flawless and filigree A-4-drawings. As to develop new visual depictions, he used a computer later as well—e.g. the screensaver Angeline (1994/96)—and so moved into a "spiritual/virtual" world.

If the drawing isn't proper, you can forget everything else.

(Wenn die Zeichnung nicht stimmt, kannst Du alles andere vergessen)

Manfred Stumpf

In 1987, he dissolved the element of the palm leaf from his icon and transferred it onto wooden objects, covered them with red paint and placed them in his hometown Alsfeld on an acre, near the Autobahn A5 as hieratic signs.

The donkey from "Entry into Jerusalem" lives an independent life as a motif as well, for example on the huge mosaic at the underground station Habsburgerallee in Frankfurt am Main, where he carries a clock, a computer display or an atomic nucleus. The mosaic was created in 1992 and displays 66 donkeys on a ca. 7874-inch wall area.

In 2005, Stumpf created a stained glass window for the Waldhufen church in Winterkasten (Germany), which represents the "Resurrection of Jesus at Easter". The colors of the window "symbolize the transition from the dark to the light in everybodys life."

For the year 2021 Manfred Stumpf plans to present Jesus' parable "A camel is more likely to go through the eye of a needle than for a rich man to enter the Kingdom of God" before the European Central Bank. A steel needle is said to protrude 23 meters above the ECB, in front of which a bronze camel will sit. When viewed from above, the needle should look like an upturned palm tree and thus symbolize the Tree of life or the Kingdom of God, Eternity. The sculpture "Camel and Eye of the Needle" should be walkable and thus experienceable.

There is a long tradition to the usage of the line. We can track it from the Egyptian Hieroglyphs with its clear and sharp outlines to Middle Age Paintings, along drawings of Romanticism, the Pop Art, until today.

== Scholarships ==
- 1991 Stipendium der Agency for Cultural Affairs (Bunkacho), Tokyo
- 1989 Villa Massimo, Rome
- 1985 Stipendium für junge Bildende Künstler, Alsfeld
- 1982 Jahresstipendium der Frankfurter Künstlerhilfe e.V.

== Awards ==
- 1988 Reinhold Kurt-Kunstpreis der Frankfurter Sparkasse
- 2015 Marielies Hess-Kunstpreis

== Exhibitions (selection) ==
- 1983 Galerie ak, Frankfurt am Main
- 1984 Von hier aus, Düsseldorf
- 1985 Galerie Stampa, Basel
- 1986 Schirn Kunsthalle Frankfurt
- 1987 Galerie Acinci, Amsterdam
- 1988 Kunsthalle Düsseldorf
- 1989 Museum of Fine Arts, Boston
- 1990 Galerie Unac, Tokyo
- 1991 Witte de Witt, Rotterdam
- 1992 Yokohama Museum of Art
- 1993 Portikus, Frankfurt am Main
- 1995 Hessisches Landesmuseum Darmstadt
- 1996 Whitney Museum, New York
- 1997 Museum of Contemporary Religious Art, St. Louis
- 1997 Museum für Moderne Kunst (MMK), Frankfurt am Main
- 2000 Dreamcity, Munich
- 2001 Super Rio Projekt, Frankfurt am Main
- 2006 "Der goldene Schritt", Kunsthalle Gießen / Popstei Oberhessen, Gießen / Neuer Kunstverein, Gießen
- 2007 "NAHES IM FERNROHR", together with Laura Baginski, Galerie Sima, Nuremberg
- 2008 "Zeit zum Palmen", Kunstverein Familie Montez, Frankfurt am Main
- 2009 "P(r)ay", Galerie Appel, directed by Brigitte Schäfer, Frankfurt am Main
- 2009 "Die Gegenwart der Linie" Pinakothek der Moderne, Munich
- 2010 "Christusfiguren", 1. Alsfelder Kulturtage
- 2012 "Bricklebrit" – Neuronautik im Techno-Kapitalismus, Galerie La Brique, Frankfurt am Main
- 2013 "Tie-Break" – Manfred Stumpf and Laura Baginski, Main Triangel, Frankfurt am Main
- 2013 "Atom and Eve", mit Michael Höpfel und Bazon Brock, Denkerei, Berlin
- 2013 "Eat me", Evangelische Akademie Frankfurt at the Epiphanias Kirche, Frankfurt am Main
- 2014 "Manfred Stumpf", Galerie Martina Detterer, Frankfurt am Main
- 2015: "Hosianna", Dommuseum Frankfurt am Main
- 2015: "Manfred Stumpf und Paul Onditi", Art Critic And Informative Forum, Art Cabinet, Nairobi, Kenia
- 2018: "einundzwanzig – Ansichten eines Kunstvereins", Neuer Kunstverein Gießen
- 2020: "Ein ganz normaler Herbst, nur anders...", Kunstverein Familie Montez, Frankfurt am Main
- 2022: "Projects #7: Zeichnung / Drawing 1970-2022", Galerie Stampa, Basel

== Collections (selection) ==
- Artothek Nuremberg
- Sammlung Hanck, Düsseldorf
- Deutsche Bank, Frankfurt am Main
- Museum für Moderne Kunst (MMK), Frankfurt am Main
- Museum Folkwang, Essen
- Sammlung zeitgenössischer Kunst der Bundesrepublik Deutschland, Bonn

== See also ==
- Palm Sunday

== Bibliography ==
- Manfred Stumpf, Jean-Christoph Amman (Hrsg.), Museum für Moderne Kunst, Frankfurt am Main, "Sketchbook for the icon 'Entry into Jerusalem'", Cantz Verlag, Ostfildern, 1996, ISBN 3-89322-856-X
- Manfred Stumpf, "OKTOGON", Museum Wiesbaden, Wiesbaden, 1987
- Manfred Stumpf; Thomas Trescher, "Palm", Edition Wilk, Frankfurt am Main, 1987
- Manfred Stumpf, "Manfred Stumpf, Der heilige Kosmonaut, Zeichnungen", Frankfurter Kunstverein, Frankfurt am Main, 1985?
- Manfred Stumpf, "Der heilige Kosmonaut, Zeichnungen", Edition Wilk, Frankfurt am Main, 1984
- Domenig, Krüger, Sanovec, Sommer, Stumpf, "Domenig, Krüger, Sanovec, Sommer, Stumpf: Malerei, Zeichnung, Film", Galerie Ak, Frankfurt am Main, 1983
- Hendricks, Deren, Stumpf, "Zeichnungen von Hendricks, Deren, Stumpf", Museum am Ostwall, Dortmund, 1985

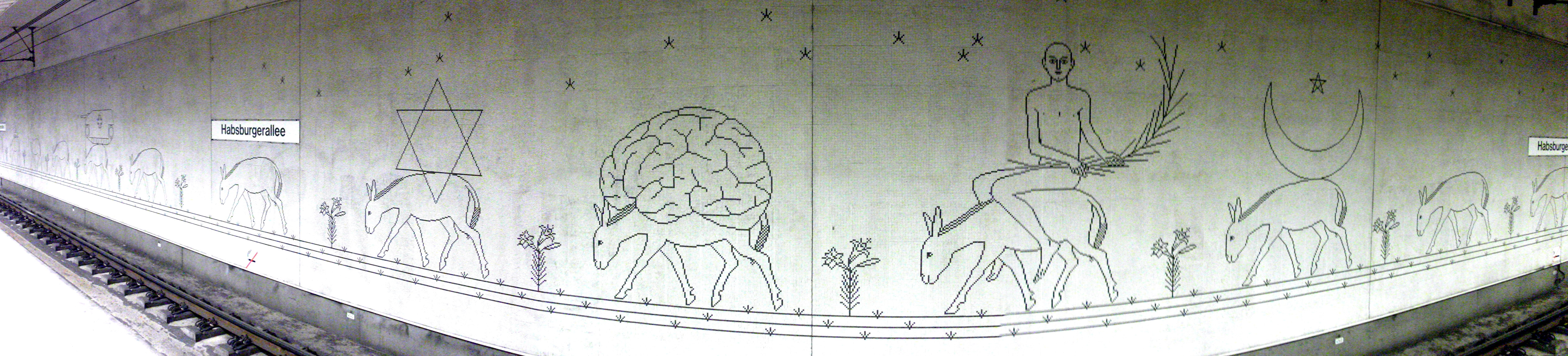
Mosaic at Habsburgerallee (Underground station), Frankfurt am Main, 2010)
