= Gerald Domenig =

Austrian artist

Gerald Domenig (born 1953 in Villach) is an Austrian artist. He lives and works in Frankfurt am Main.

== Life and work ==
Gerald Domenig studied from 1972 to 1973 at the Kunstakademie Düsseldorf under Rolf Sackenheim and from 1974 to 1978 at the Städelschule in Frankfurt am Main under Raimer Jochims, who was already teaching photography at the academy at the time. He taught as a visiting professor at Städelschule and Academy of Fine Arts, Nuremberg.

Gerald Domenig's chosen media are photography - which he recognized in the late 1970s as “poetry and a medium to be taken seriously” -, drawing and writing.

Gerald Domenig's photography is characterized by "formal rigour" and "openness", his subjects are decisively mundane, and he "likes to highlight formal analogies between his pictures". Klaus Görner, curator of the 2015 exhibition at the MMK, emphasizes that his photos are not about the relationship between reality and image, but that they are independent, the “things” that appear in them only have meaning insofar as “they are elements of a game within the image.” “When I make photographs, I want to translate an image hidden in the three-dimensional world, a latent flatness, into a concrete picture,” Domenig says. In 1984, he was part of the group exhibition "Von hier aus - Zwei Monate neue deutsche Kunst in Düsseldorf".

He constantly publishes books, sometimes in very small editions and sometimes they include a written statement that they are “not for sale” (e.g. “Das Schwarzweissfoto eines Weinkorkens”, 2023).

== Exhibitions (Selection) ==
- 2025: DOM, Dommuseum Frankfurt
- 2023: FOTOHOF – with Andrea Witzmann
- 2016: Awåragaude?, Vienna Secession
- 2015: Exhibition Preparations, Museum für Moderne Kunst, MMK1, Frankfurt am Main.
- 1988 „Bclik”, Portikus - with Franz West, curated by Kasper König
- 1982: Galerie am Promenadeplatz, Munich

== Publications (Selection) ==
- Gun, Ritter Verlag, Klagenfurt, 1993, ISBN 3-85415-118-7
- Die gute Naht, Ritter Verlag, Klagenfurt, 1995, ISBN 3-85415-179-9
- Gerald Domenig and Urs Frei, VENEDIG. Urs Frei in San Staë, Verlag der Buchhandlung Walther König, Cologne, ISBN 978-3-88375-320-1
- Nivea und Nivea, Verlag der Buchhandlung Walther König, Cologne , 2008, ISBN 386560479X
- Gerald Domenig and Nicole Van den Plas, Die andere Hälfte, Frankfurt am Main, 2017, ISBN 978-3-943619-52-2.
- I CALL THEM SQUARES, Frankfurt am Main, 2019, KANN-Verlag, ISBN 978-3-943619-79-9.
- MELODROM, edited by Regina Barunke, Verlag der Buchhandlung Walther König, Cologne, 2019, ISBN 978-3-96098-741-3
- 12. NOV / M21 – Gerald Domenig, Nicole van den Plas, Christian Hanussek, KANN-Verlag, Frankfurt am Main, 2020, ISBN 978-3-943619-90-4.
- 20182019. KANN-Verlag, Frankfurt am Main, 2020, ISBN 978-3-943619-86-7
- Das Schwarzweissfoto eines Weinkorkens, includes texts by: Gerald Domenig, Emmanuel Wiemer, Ulf Erdmann Ziegler, Frank Witzel, Andreas Maier, Philipp Mosetter und Carl-Friedrich Thoma. KANN-Verlag, Frankfurt am Main, 2023, ISBN 978-3-949312-67-0
- F-Phil-Joe, FOTOHOF EDITION, Salzburg, 2023, ISBN 978-3-903334-36-6
- GD West, edited by Ines Turian, FOTOHOF EDITION, Salzburg, 2025, ISBN 978-3-903334-97-7
- GD DOM, Verlag der Buchhandlung Walther und Franz König, Cologne, 2025, ISBN 978-3-7533-0883-8

== Awards (Selection) ==
- 2021: Österreichischer Kunstpreis für Künstlerische Fotografie [Austrian State Prize for Artistic Photography]
- 1978: Ars viva

== Literature ==
- Kasper König (Ed.) and Karin Thomas, Ulrich Look and others: von hier aus – Zwei Monate neue deutsche Kunst in Düsseldorf, Exhibition Catalog, DuMont, Cologne, 1984, ISBN 3-7701-1650-X
