= Milan Kunc =

Czech painter and sculptor

- Born: 27 November 1944 (age 81); Prague, Protectorate of Bohemia and Moravia
- Education: Academy of Fine Arts in Prague, Kunstakademie Düsseldorf, European Ceramic Workcentre
- Known for: Painting, sculpture, printmaking, photography, performance, music, ceramic art
- Style: Embarrassing Realism, Ost-Pop
- Website: milan-kunc.com

Signature
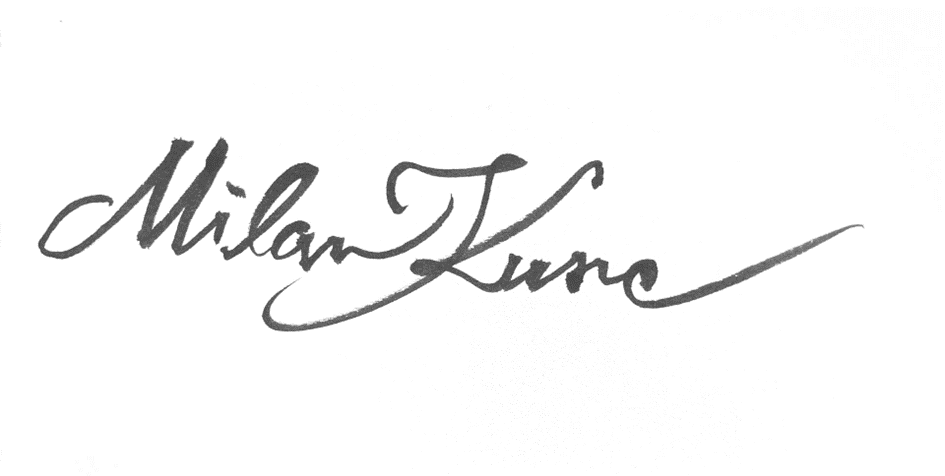

Milan Kunc (born 27 November 1944) is a Czech postmodern painter and sculptor. He is known for "Embarrassing Realism," "Pop Surrealism," and "Ost-Pop," art movements characterized by their critique of society and media through ironic or melodramatic subject matter. In the late 1970s and early 1980s, his work, which often contrasted with the era's mainstream, made him a member of the Neue Wilde.

== Life ==
Kunc was born on 27 November 1944 in Prague. He studied at Prague's Academy of Fine Arts from 1963 to 1967. During the Prague Spring in 1968 and Czechoslovakia's occupation by Warsaw Pact troops, he was serving his mandatory military service, but on the day of the invasion (21 August 1968), he was in a military prison for civil disobedience. That night, he created an oil painting depicting a pair of army boots in reference to the famous painting of old shoes by Vincent van Gogh. In the 1970s, Kunc would process his experiences from this time in his life in a series of paintings, collages, and performance pieces that he called "Embarrassing Realism." He emigrated to West Germany in 1969, became a German citizen, and attended the Kunstakademie Düsseldorf in 1970–1975, where his teachers included Joseph Beuys and Gerhard Richter. Going against the conceptual mainstream at the academy and the leftist leanings of the era's art scene at the time, Kunc instead focused on empathy, irony, sarcasm, color, and experimentation.

In 1973, Kunc made his first trip to New York, where he met fellow Czech artist and former student of Gerhard Richter Jan Knap, with whom Kunc closely collaborated afterwards. This trip, along with a visit to an exhibition by Saul Steinberg, inspired Kunc to begin drawing, a discipline that he has continuously developed over the years. There followed visits to Mexico, Guatemala, and Honduras. Also around this time, he produced his first works of "Embarrassing Realism."

In Düsseldorf in 1979, Kunc joined with Knap and Peter Angermann to found the internationally renowned Group Normal. Some of the group's earliest exhibitions were in 1980 at the Neue Galerie / Sammlung Ludwig, in New York (The Times Square Show), and at the Musée de la Ville as part of the eleventh Biennale de Paris. In 1984, Group Normal was included in the exhibition Von hier aus, organized by curator Kaspar König in Düsseldorf. In the 1980s, Kunc was considered a part of the "Junge Wilde" – the "wild young" artists of the German art scene. During this time, he collaborated with Jörg Immendorff on, among other things, posters, performances, and happenings (art actions) with a socio-critical commentary on the era's lack of environmental awareness – a subject that Kunc has explored throughout his career using his inimitable visual vocabulary. In the mid-1980s, he again visited the United States and South America, this time in the company of Silke Niehaus, whom he described as his "muse."

In 1983, Kunc showed his work at documenta IX in Kassel. In the 1980s and 1990s, he lived and worked in both New York and Cologne, his son Roman was born to him and his then-partner, the artist and museum director Anne Frechen. During this era, he exhibited alongside artists such as George Condo at the Pat Hearn, Sprüth-Magers, Barbara Gladstone, Tony Shafrazi, and Robert Miller galleries. In 1988–1991, he spent time in Rome and Tuscany. Among the works produced during these years is a series of surreal landscapes and mannerist portraits that he exhibited at the Robert Miller Gallery. During his time in Italy, he refined his brushwork, leaving behind his earlier expressionist ductus in favor of a neoclassical and mannerist approach. With this "Lichtmalerei," he broke with the German mainstream and developed his own figurative style of painting.

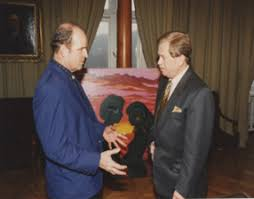
Milan Kunc with Václav Havel in 1992

After the fall of the Iron Curtain in 1989, Kunc moved back to Cologne. In 1992, he accepted an invitation from President Václav Havel to visit Prague. The following year, he showed a comprehensive selection of his work at solo exhibition at the Belvedere, followed by reprise showings in Karlsruhe, at Kunsthal Rotterdam, and at the Malmö Konsthall. In the mid-1990s, Kunc repeatedly produced ceramic sculptures in The Hague. In 2008, he accepted an invitation from the European Ceramic Work Centre in 's-Hertogenbosch.

In 1997 and 1998, Kunc was professor at the Kunstakademie Kassel, after which he returned to Cologne. He married the artist Olga Maler-Kunc in 2003; their daughter Věra was born in 2002. In the first decade of the new millennium, Kunc undertook several study trips to Italy and India. He returned to his hometown of Prague in 2004.

== Artistic periods ==
While still a student at the Kunstakademie Düsseldorf, Kunc developed an artistic style that he called "Embarrassing Realism." He particularly created paintings and collages that took an ironic and provocative view of everyday life and consumer society. In the late 1970s, Kunc was already exploring the globalization of Western consumer icons as well as the double standard in the Eastern Bloc countries regarding consumer behavior in works he described as "Ost-Pop." Actionist performances in Germany (Wuppertal) und the Soviet Union (Moscow) produced heated debate and controversial publications. This artistic style marked the beginning of an experimental period during which Kunc processed his personal experiences from the Cold War, creating objects that brought together consumer society, ideology, East, and West. He created staged photographs and performance pieces on this subject as well.

In 1977 in Düsseldorf, Kunc began to create ceramic sculptures, which he continued in 1995 in The Hague. His intense occupation with subjects related to the environment, media criticism, and the mystical and surreal produced another creative period in which he created more than a hundred ceramic pieces, of which the Louis Vuitton Collection acquired a number of fashionably whimsical objects. An exhibition at the Kunstpalast Düsseldorf (Luxus Keramik) was followed by international showings in New York (Sperone Westwater), Trento (Studio d'Arte Raffaelli), Brno (House of Arts Brno), and Erfurt (Kunsthalle Erfurt). In 2008, Kunc worked at the European Ceramic Work Centre in 's-Hertogenbosch, Netherlands. His works were shown, among other places, at the Sculptures exhibition organized by the Andrea Caratsch Gallery in Zurich and St. Moritz. In 2013, Kunc accepted an invitation to the Korean International Ceramic Biennale in Gyeonggi, South Korea.

After the fall of the Iron Curtain, Kunc was invited by Czechoslovak President Václav Havel to hold a solo exhibition at Queen Anne's Summer Palace near Prague Castle. The exhibition inspired debate on current issues such as intercultural openness, the search for identity, migration, and social and political change. Kunc saw contemporary developments as confirming his ideas from the early 1980s, including the provocative and prophetic visual imagery of his works. In 2015, Kunc was included in the exhibition The 80s: Figurative Painting in West Germany at the Städel Museum in Frankfurt, which was reprised at the Groninger Museum in Groningen, Netherlands.

In 2019, Kunc decorated a BMW i8 on the subject of the pressing environmental issues of our time. Though not an official BMW Art Car, it is exhibited at the BMW Museum and was auctioned to raise funding for The Ocean Cleanup project.

In 2021, Kampus Hybernská in Prague honored Kunc with a solo exhibition titled Beyond the Imagination: Paintings and Sculptures 1968 – 2021, which presented a comprehensive look at his various artistic periods.

Kunc's work can be found in numerous collections, including:

Coca Cola Collection, Verona, Italy; Deutsche Bank Stiftung, Frankfurt, Germany; Groninger Museum, Groningen, Netherlands; Hessisches Landesmuseum Darmstadt, Germany; Museum Würth, Künzelsau, Germany; Kunstmuseum Düsseldorf, Germany; Kunstmuseum Bonn, Germany; Louis Vuitton, Italy / France; Sylvester Stallone, Santa Monica, USA; Stadtmuseum Düsseldorf, Germany; Kunsthalle Mannheim, Germany; Rooseum Malmö, Sweden; MOCA Museum of Contemporary Art, Los Angeles, USA; Museum Boijmans Van Beuningen, Rotterdam, Netherlands; Stedelijk Museum, Amsterdam, Netherlands; Olomouc Museum of Art, Olomouc, Czech Republic; National Gallery Prague, Czech Republic; Fonds Hélène et Édouard Leclerc, Landerneau, France.

== Reception ==
Kunc is considered an anti-conformist artist who rejects conventional aesthetics and ideologies. Especially in his Embarrassing Realism, Kunc's depictions of the insanity of reality reflect the influence of Magritte's "Vache period," Picabia, and Kippenberger, among others. His art is a paradoxical combination of irony and idealism. His unique visual style introduces new accents into figurative art and draws inspiration from Czechoslovak artistic tradition (portraiture, mystical landscapes, Symbolism, Cubism, caricature), which he further develops using his own stylistic approaches, themes, and critique of the current Zeitgeist. Kunc's ironic and provocative take on everyday life and his embarrassing yet resonant interpretation of burning sociopolitical issues can be found throughout his entire career.

Kunc's themes (the environment, feminism, media, social and political double standards) reflect contemporary global challenges. In 1989, ART – Das Kunstmagazin summarized Kunc's work in an article titled "International Success between Kitsch and Art." A selection of other authors' assessments of his work:

[...] there is no better description of the things that the contemporary viewer notices in Milan Kunc's Ost-Pop series (1977–1997): these works predicted developments that have become apparent around the world, meaning the mixing of everyday symbols from East and West. The opening of Eastern Europe's political, economic, and media landscape has produce a strange and aesthetically appealing environment which [...] stages a coming-together of socialist status symbols with the ever-increasing symbols of commercial Western consumer culture.

— Boris Groys

Milan Kunc ties us in a Gordian knot, a contradiction with no dialectical way out. This contradiction is typically represented using the simple, ordinary, ingratiating, made-up, and generalizing tools of kitsch, which cause the contradiction to appear strangely banal, deceptive, and 'homemade' and which is thus only credible for the naive and gullible people. But Milan Kunc contradicts kitsch itself by applying its seeming unambiguity in order to produce ambiguity. He ties his message into inextricable knots, causing kitsch (which is supposed to be easy to consume and comprehend) to suddenly appear very 'difficult.'"

— Donald Kuspit

Kunc's entire art has been forged in reaction to this melting pot of contradictions. compromises and submissiveness: an ontological anti-conformist. He dismisses all aesthetics and ideologies. His paintings in the Embarrassing Realism series, for example, flirt with the crusts of the earth and clearly go beyond not only good taste, but also political correctness, following the example of Magritte's Période Vache or certain works by Picabia or Kippenberger (who admired them). Totally atypical, Kunc is a virtuoso draughtsman and painter, paradoxically imbued with irony and idealism, whose exceptional and singular itinerary [took him] from the tanks of the Red Army to the temples of contemporary Western aesthetics. By the end of the 1970s, he had already taken interest in some of the major themes dominating art today, such as ecology, feminism, the denunciation of media and political formatting, totalitarian individualism and the affluent consumer society. Initially perceived as part of the figuration libre, cultivated painting or new expressionism that dominated the art of the 1980s, Kunc's painting is only now asserting its absolute singularity, making him one of the main precursors of the current revival of figuration."

— Stéphane Corréard and Hervé Loevenbruck, Loeve & Co., Paris

== Gallery ==
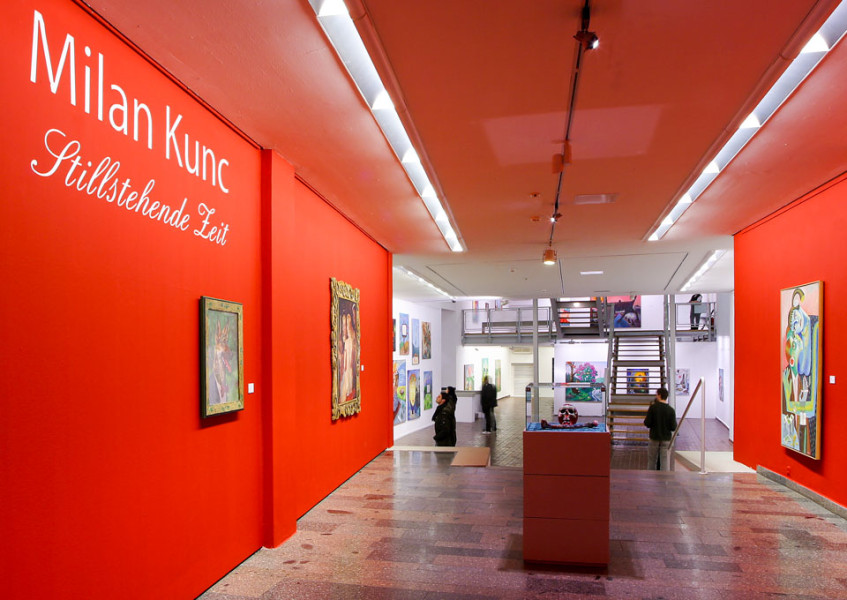
Kunsthalle Erfurt 2007

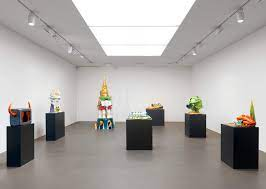
Sculptures, Galerie Andrea Caratsch 2009

== Exhibitions (selection) ==
=== Solo exhibitions ===
- 1980: Galerie 't Venster, Rotterdam
- 1980: Groninger Museum, Groningen
- 1981: Kantor Gallery, Los Angeles
- 1983: Swart Gallery, Amsterdam
- 1984: Von hier aus, Messe Düsseldorf (curator: Kaspar König)
- 1984: Neue Ikonen, Kunstverein für die Rheinlande und Westfalen, Düsseldorf
- 1984: Nieuwe Ikonen, Groninger Museum
- 1985: Galerie Monika Sprüth, Cologne
- 1987: Galerie Monika Sprüth, Cologne
- 1987: Pat Hearn Gallery, New York
- 1989: Robert Miller Gallery, New York
- 1992: Gallery Korridor, Reykjavík
- 1993: Neue Ikonen, OST-POP und Peinlicher Realismus, Belvedere, Prague
- 1993: Malmö Konsthall
- 1993: Kunstverein Karlsruhe
- 1993: Demonstrating New Icons, documenta 9, Kassel
- 1994: Kunsthal Rotterdam
- 2000: Galerie Gian Enzo Sperone, Rome / New York
- 2001: Galleria d’Arte Moderna e Contemporanea della Republica, San Marino
- 2003: Große Kunstausstellung NRW, Museum Kunstpalast, Düsseldorf; Deichtorhallen, Hamburg; David Zwirner, New York
- 2006: Galerie Caesar, Olomouc
- 2006: Olieverven en Tekeningen, Galerie Witteveen, Amsterdam
- 2007: Golden Age, Kunsthalle Erfurt
- 2007: Brno House of Arts, Brno
- 2009: Sculptures, Galerie Andrea Caratsch, Zurich / St. Moritz
- 2010: Amor a Psyche, Muzeum Olomouc
- 2012: Golden Paintings, Galerie Andrea Caratsch, St. Moritz
- 2012: Milan Kunc – Dipinti, Galleria Zonca & Zonca, Mailand
- 2012: Gold, Belvedere Palais, Vienna
- 2013: Korean International Ceramic Biennale, Gyeonggi, South Korea
- 2015: Nieuwe Wilden, Groninger Museum, Groningen (NL)
- 2017: Global Success, Paintings und Sculptures. Fondation Speerstra, Apples (CH)
- 2018: Kunstmesse NOMAD, Plastiken und Bilder, Galerie Andrea Caratsch, St. Moritz
- 2018: BMW Roadster i8 4 Elements, BMW Museum, Munich
- 2019: Vanitas, DOX, Prague
- 2020: From Utopia to Dystopia and Back, Galerie Andrea Caratsch, St. Moritz
- 2021: POP et Surréalistes (with Philippe Mayaux), Loeve&Co. Gallery, Paris
- 2021: Beyond the Imagination: Paintings and Sculptures 1968–2021, Kampus Hybernská, Prague
- 2022: Gallery Sofie Van de Velde, Antwerpen
- 2023: The Hijacking of Europe, Prague House, Brussels
- 2023: 51 ans peinture révolutionnaire indépendant 1972 – 2023, Loeve&Co. Gallery, Paris

=== Group exhibitions ===
- 1975: Peinlicher Realismus, Galeria Art 296, Düsseldorf
- 1976: Nachbarschaft, Kunsthalle, Düsseldorf
- 1977: Luxuskeramik, Ehrenhof, Düsseldorf
- 1978: 10 Jahre nach der Besetzung der Tschechoslowakei, Galerie Arno Kohnen, Düsseldorf (with Jörg Immendorff, Felix Droese, and others)
- 1979: Kunstanschläge I (Group Normal), Galerie Magers, Bonn
- 1980: Mysterium der Geburt, Museum Ludwig Aachen (with Peter Angermann and Jan Knap)
- 1980: The Times Square Show, Group Normal, New York
- 1981: XI. Biennale de Paris, Musée de la Ville
- 1981: Treibhaus, Kunstmuseum Düsseldorf, Düsseldorf
- 1981: Normal, Neue Galerie – Museum Ludwig, Aachen
- 1981: Kunstanschläge II, Galerie Magers, Bonn
- 1982: between 9, Kunsthalle Düsseldorf
- 1982: 10 junge Künstler aus Deutschland, Folkwang Museum, Essen
- 1982: Normal, Galeria Nörballe, Copenhagen
- 1982: Thinking of the Europe, The Living Art Museum, Reykjavik, Iceland
- 1982: Gott oder Geissel – Erotik in der Kunst heute, Kunstverein München
- 1982: La Giovane Pittura in Germania, Galeria d’Arte Moderna, Bologna
- 1983: Intoxication, Monique Knowlton Gallery, New York
- 1983: Der letzte Schrei, Malhaus, Kunstmuseum Düsseldorf
- 1983: Group Show, Pat Hearn Gallery, New York
- 1984: Ansatzpunkte kritischer Kunst heute, Kunstverein Bonn
- 1984: Neue Gesellschaft für bildende Kunst, Berlin
- 1984: Handpainted Dreams, Barbara Gladstone Gallery, New York
- 1984: 7 Maler als Graphiker, Kunstring Folkwang, Essen
- 1984: Von hier aus. Zwei Monate deutsche Kunst in Düsseldorf, Group Normal
- 1985: Photographs of Contemporary Artists, Pace McGill Gallery, New York
- 1985: Rheingold. 40 artisti di Colonia e Düsseldorf, Palazzo delle Belle Arti, Turin
- 1985: Tiefe Blicke, Hessisches Landesmuseum Darmstadt
- 1995: Künstliche Paradiese, Museum Folkwang, Essen; Kunstverein München
- 1985: Work of Paper, Pat Hearn Gallery, New York
- 1986: Kunstmatige Paradijsen, Bonnefantenmuseum Maastricht
- 1986: Kunc, Ontani, Salvo, Galleria Luce, Venice
- 1986: Milan Kunc and Jiří Georg Dukoupil, Edward Totah Gallery, London
- 1986: Kunc, Ontani, Salvo, Schulze, Le Casa d§Arte, Milan
- 1986: Terra Motus, Fondatione Lucio Armelio, Naples
- 1986: What It Is, Tony Shafrazi Gallery, New York
- 1986: Europa / Amerika. Die Geschichte einer künstlerischen Faszination, Museum Ludwig, Cologne
- 1986: Aanwinsten moderne Kunst, Museum Boijmans van Beuningen, Rotterdam
- 1987: Collection Peter Brahms, Fred L. Emerson Gallery, New York
- 1987: Sette artisti dell '87, Monti associatione culturale, Rome
- 1987: drawing – tekenen 87 – design – zeichnen, Museum Boijmans van Beuningen, Rotterdam
- 1988: Dokoupil, Kunc, Pagano, Salvatori, Salvo, Galeria Nuova Pesa, Rome
- 1988: Ritratti di un nome A.B.O. Fortezza, Da Baso, Florence
- 1988: Hommage – Demontage, Provinciaal Museum, Hasselt
- 1988: Eros&Arch., Galerie Torch, Amsterdam
- 1988: Kölner Künstler Photographieren (Sammlung Gundlach), Kölnischer Kunstverein, Cologne
- 1988: Nature Morte, Galerie Magers, Bonn
- 1988: Sammlung Murken, Städtisches Kunstmuseum Bonn
- 1989: Pyramiden, Galerie Jule Kewenig, Frechen / Cologne
- 1989: Natura Morta, La Casa d'Arte, Milano
- 1989: Das konstruierte Bild, Kunstverein München, Munich; Kunsthalle Nürnberg; Badischer Kunstverein Karlsruhe
- 1989: Aarton l'influenza di fumetto nelle artivisive del XX seculo, Palazzo Civitá del Lavoro, Rome
- 1989: Prospect 89, Frankfurter Kunstverein, Schirn Kunsthalle, Frankfurt am Main
- 1989: Collectiva, Galleria Nicola Verlatto, Bologna
- 1990: Peter Angermann, Milan Kunc, Jan Knap, Galeria Temple, Valencia
- 1990: Maximalismus / Maximalisme, Galerie Schulze, Cologne
- 1990: Landscapes, Kunc Salvo Thompson, Milagros Contemporary Art, San Antonio, Texas
- 1990: Europa America: Aspetti degli anni '80, Esedra Arte Contemporanea, Asti
- 1990: Peter Angermann, Jan Knap, Milan Kunc, Galerie Kaess-Weiss, Stuttgart
- 1991: Ambienti, Galleria Credito Valtellinese, Milan
- 1991: Kitsch blir Kunst, Kunstforeningen, Kunstmuseum Herning, Denmark
- 1991: Maximalists: Friedjonsson, Jori, Kunc, Shokof, Vaccari, Bess Cutler Gallery, New York
- 1991: Das Goldene Zeitalter, Württembergischer Kunstverein, Stuttgart
- 1991: Wanderlieder, Stedelijk Museum, Amsterdam
- 1992: Gocart, Bianca Pilat Galleria, Milan
- 1992: 7 artisti in vetta, Studio d'Arte Raffaelli, Trento
- 1992: Ceskoslovenská fotografie v exilu, Galerie Mánes, Prague
- 1993: Gartenzwerge für die IGA, Artlantis, Stuttgart
- 1993: Trevi ex Vero, Palazzo Ubaldi, Trevi
- 1994: Le Cirque, Renée Fotouhi Fine Art, East Hampton, New York
- 1994: Galerie de la Tour, Amsterdam
- 1995: Galerie Apunto, Amsterdam
- 1995: Tony Gragg, Milan Kunc, Carel Visser – ontwerpen in glas, Carin Delcourt van Krimpen, Amsterdam
- 1996: Arch Connelly, Milan Kunc, Artus Pixel, Domenico Zidato, Oeuvres porno-erotiques, Gallery OZ, Paris
- 1996: Artfair, Stelling Gallery, Amsterdam
- 1997: Brandend zaud-heramiek, Museum Beelden aam Zee, The Hague
- 1998: Okruh umělců, Galerie Carini, Barni Bonechi Canella Knap Kunc Salvo, Galerie Caesar, Olomouc
- 1998: Sculpture in ceramica, Franss Hals Museum, Haarlem
- 2000: umění 20. století / art of the 20th century, National Gallery Prague
- 2000: Venti da Nord, Galleria Galicia, Milan
- 2000: Glas, Galerie Uta Klotz, Cologne
- 2000: Il Corridoro, Hafnarhus, Reykjavik
- 2000: Sympozium Dílna, Zámek Mikulov, Mikulov
- 2001: Home Made, Musée internationale des Arts Modestes, Sete
- 2001: Pat Hearn Memorial, Robert Miller Gallery, New York
- 2001: Floating Time 2001 / Tuin der Lusten / Bizar Realisme Museum Het Kruithuis, 's-Hertogenbosch
- 2001: Juliet XX Years, Trieste
- 2002: Cowboys en Kroegtigers, Gemeentenmuseum Helmont
- 2002: Klopfzeichen / Kunst und Kultur der 80er Jahre in Deutschland, Museum der bildenden Künste und zeitgeschichtliches Forum, Leipzig
- 2003: Pictura magistra vitae / il novi simboli della pittura contemporanea Fondazione Cassa di Risparmio in Bologna
- 2003: Dalí und die Magier der Mehrdeutigkeit, Museum Kunstpalast Düsseldorf
- 2003: D'Après. Da Anzinger a Warhol, Gas art Gallery, Turin
- 2003: Bright Lights, Big City, David Zwirner, New York
- 2003: A Clear Vision: Photografische Werke aus der Sammlung F.C. Gundlach, Internationales Haus der Fotografie, Deichtorhallen Hamburg
- 2004: Il Nudo. Fra ideale e Realità, Galleria d'Arte Moderna, Bologna
- 2004: Art Prague, Veletrh sočasného umění, Mánes, Galerie Caesar, Olomouc
- 2004: Trentacinquesimo, Studio d'arte Cannaviello, Milan
- 2004: Begegnungen – das Vertraute im Unbekannten, Galerie Kubus, Hanover
- 2004: Passione di Mela, Palazzo Morenberg, Sarnonico
- 2004: Smile Away the Parties, Gemeentemuseum Helmont
- 2004: Bylo, nebylo... Pohádkové movivi v českém moderním a současném umění, Galerie moderního umění, Hradec Králové
- 2005: Normal Group, Prague Biennale 2, Karlín Hall, Prague
- 2005: Sich selbst bei Laune halten – Kunst der 70er aus der Schenkung Ingrid Oppenheim, Kunstmuseum Bonn
- 2005: Art Prague, Mánes, Prague; Galerie Caesar, Olomouc
- 2005: The Subjective Figure, Robert Miller Gallery, New York
- 2005: Eye to Eye: Photographic Collection of the Groninger Museum, Groningen
- 2005: Horká jehla / Hot Needle: Graphic Works of the 1980s, GHMP, Prague
- 2006: 80 plus 25 equals 2005 (Art from the 80s), Galerie Witteveen, Amsterdam
- 2006: Normal Group, Museo d'Arte Contemporanea, Isernia
- 2006: Art Prague, Mánes, Prague; Galerie Caesar, Olomouc
- 2006: La donna aggetto, Miti e metamorfosi al femminile 1990 – 2005, Castello Sforcesco, Vigevano
- 2015: Neue Wilde. Die 80er. Figurative Malerei in der BRD, Städel Museum, Frankfurt am Main
- 2023: VIVID Gallery, Rotterdam
