= Daniel Birnbaum =

Swedish art curator and critic (born 1963)

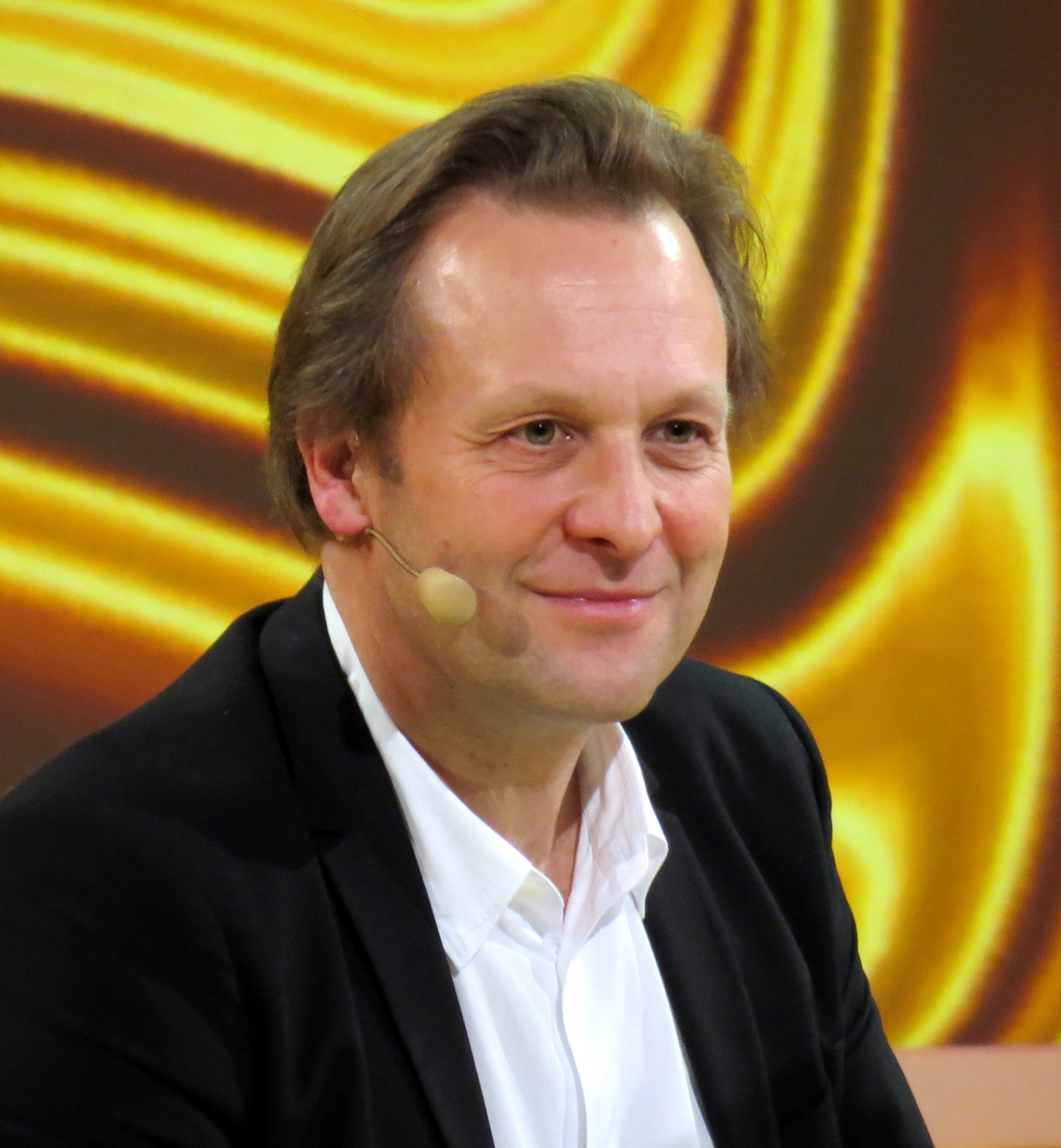
- Daniel Birnbaum in 2017
- Born: 10 July 1963; Stockholm, Sweden
- Occupation: Curator

Daniel Birnbaum is a Swedish art curator and an art critic. Since 2019, he has been director and curator of Acute Art in London, UK.

== Early life and education ==
Birnbaum studied at Stockholm University, Freie Universität Berlin in Germany and Columbia University in New York. In 1998, he completed his doctorate in philosophy at Stockholm University.

== Career ==
=== Early beginnings ===
Birnbaum has been the curator of institutions and exhibitions in many countries, for which he has produced catalogue entries. In 1998, he became director of Sweden's International Artists Studio Program (IASPIS), a position he held until 2000. During that time, he was also a co-curator of the 1st MOMENTUM biennale in Moss, Norway, in 1998, with Lars Bang Larsen and Atle Gerhardsen.

=== Städelschule, 2001–2010 ===
Between 2001 and 2010, Birnbaum held the position of Rector at the Städelschule fine arts academy in Frankfurt am Main in Germany. During that time, he also served as director of Portikus, an exhibition space at the Städelschule since 1987.

In addition to his role at Städelschule, Birnbaum served as a member of the board of the Manifesta biennale in Amsterdam from 2002 to 2009. In 2003, he was co-curator of the international section of the 50th Venice Biennale. From 2004 to 2007, he was associate curator of the Magasin 3 exhibition space in Stockholm. In 2005, he was co-curator of the 1st Moscow Biennale. From 2006 to 2008, he was co-curator of Uncertain States of America with Hans Ulrich Obrist and Gunnar B. Kvaran at CCS Bard College, the Serpentine Gallery, the 2nd Moscow Biennale, the Rudolfinum Galerie, and the Astrup Fearnley Museum, among other locations. In 2007, he was co-curator of Airs de Paris with Christine Macel at the Centre Pompidou. In 2008, he was co-curator of the 3rd Yokohama Triennale with Hu Fang, Akiko Miyake, Hans-Ulrich Obrist, and Beatrix Ruf, and curator of the 2nd Torino Triennale, 50 Moons of Saturn. In 2009, he was the artistic director of the 53rd Venice Biennale.

Birnbaum also served on the juries for the Turner Prize (2008) and the first Future Generation Art Prize (2010).

=== Moderna Museet, 2010–2018 ===
From 2010 to 2018, Birnbaum served as the director of Moderna Museet, the museum of modern art in Stockholm.

In 2015, Birnbaum chaired the jury that awarded the Museum Ludwig's Wolfgang Hahn Prize to Michael Krebber and R. H. Quaytman.

Birnbaum was the co-curator of Hilma af Klint: Painting the Unseen with Emma Enderby at the Serpentine Galleries in 2016 and of Hilma af Klint: Possible Worlds with Jochen Volz at the Pinacoteca in São Paulo in 2018. He has been an adjunct board member of the Hilma Af Klint Foundation since 2017.

=== Later career ===
In 2018, Birnbaum announced that he would leave his post to head up Acute Art, a company with an interest in creating virtual-reality and augmented-reality works in collaboration with artists.

== Publications ==
While in New York in the 1990s, Birnbaum began to write for Artforum and subsequently became a contributing editor. He also published articles in other international art magazines such as frieze.

He has written on artists Olafur Eliasson, Pierre Huyghe, Dominique Gonzalez-Foerster, Wolfgang Tillmans, Cerith Wyn Evans and Paul Chan.

He has produced academic texts and translations on Novalis, Edmund Husserl, Martin Heidegger, Gottlob Frege, Ludwig Wittgenstein, Jacques Derrida, Thomas Bernhard, and Jean-François Lyotard:

- Daniel Birnbaum, The Hospitality of Presence: Problems of Otherness in Husserl's Phenomenology, Stockholm: Almqvist & Wiksell International, 1998, 200 p., ISBN 978-91-22-01803-2. A new edition was published ten years later: Daniel Birnbaum, The Hospitality of Presence: Problems of Otherness in Husserl's Phenomenology, Berlin: Sternberg Press, 2008, 278 p., ISBN 978-1-933128-28-3
- Heike Belzer and Daniel Birnbaum, eds., Kunst Lehren – Teaching Art: Städelschule Frankfurt/Main, Cologne: Verlag der Buchhandlung Walther König, 2007, 376 p., English / German, ISBN 978-3-86560-339-5
- Daniel Birnbaum and Isabelle Graw, eds., Under Pressure: Pictures, Subjects, and the New Spirit of Capitalism, Institut für Kunstkritik series, Berlin: Sternberg Press, 2008, 96 p., ISBN 978-1-933128-27-6
- Daniel Birnbaum and Sven-Olov Wallenstein, Spacing Philosophy: Lyotard and the Idea of the Exhibition, Institut für Kunstkritik series, Berlin: Sternberg Press, 2019, 252 p., ISBN 978-3-95679-388-2

== Bibliography ==
- La Biennale di Venezia - Daniel Birnbaum
- Texts and curated projects by Daniel Birnbaum at museum in progress
