= Kasper König =

German museum director and curator (1943–2024)

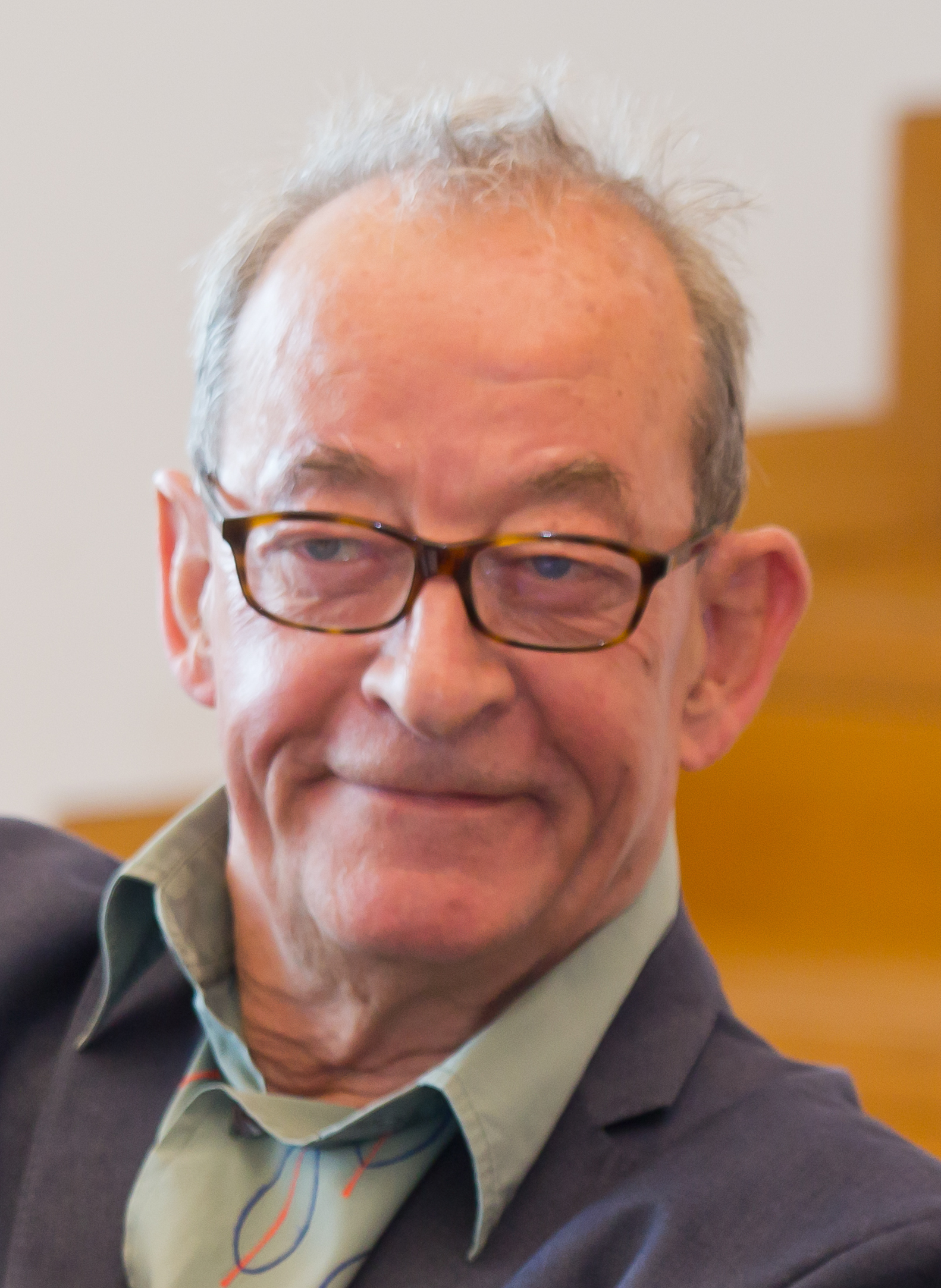
- König in 2012
- Born: Rudolf Hans König; 21 November 1943; Mettingen, Gau Westphalia-North, Germany
- Died: 9 August 2024 (aged 80); Berlin, Germany
- Occupations: Museum director; Curator; Academic teacher
- Organizations: Skulptur Projekte Münster; Städelschule; Museum Ludwig
- Spouses: Ilka Schellenberg; Edda Köchl-König; Barbara Weiss; Heidi Specker
- Children: 4, including Johann
- Website: Official website

Rudolf Hans "Kasper" König (German pronunciation: [ˈʁuː.dɔlf ˈhans ˈkas.pɐ ˈkøː.nɪç]; 21 November 1943 – 9 August 2024) was a German museum director and curator. He curated exhibitions of works by Claes Oldenburg and Andy Warhol in the 1960s, initiated the Skulptur Projekte Münster in the 1970s, founded the Portikus hall and became a professor at the Städelschule in Frankfurt in the 1980s, and was director of the Museum Ludwig in Cologne from 2000 to 2012.

== Early life ==
Rudolf Hans König was born in Mettingen, Germany on 21 November 1943, the youngest of six children.

== Career ==
König worked as a volunteer at the Rudolf Zwirner gallery in Cologne in 1962, focused on pop art and other current art. In 1963 he moved to London where he worked for galleries Annely Juda and Robert Fraser, and also attended lectures in art history at the Courtauld Institute of Art. He was set-up assistant at the Documenta III in 1964, on a recommendation by Arnold Bode.

In 1965, he travelled to New York City, as a courier on behalf of the Robert Fraser Gallery, where he then lived intermittently until 1978. He adopted the given name Kasper in the mid-1960s. He worked on exhibition and publication projects for European museums and as an art dealer. He established contacts with artists including Carl Andre, Richard Artschwager, Hanne Darboven, Dan Graham, On Kawara, Sol LeWitt, Gordon Matta-Clark, Bruce Nauman, Claes Oldenburg and Andy Warhol. He attended lectures in anthropology at the New School in New York City.

König was an assistant to Oldenburg, and he represented Stockholm's Moderna Museet in New York. He curated his first exhibition with works by Oldenburg at the Moderna Museet in 1966. In 1968 he founded a publishing firm together with his brother Walter. In 1969, he curated a major exhibition of works by Warhol in Stockholm.

From 1973 to 1975, König taught as an associate professor at the Nova Scotia College of Art and Design in Halifax, Canada. Also in 1973, he founded a publishing firm there, Press of the Nova Scotia College of Art and Design, publishing a series of art books names Source Materials of the Contemporary Arts. Invited by Klaus Bußmann from Münster, he initiated and directed Skulptur Projekte Münster in 1977, an exhibition of large sculptured in public space in the town, which has been held regularly in a cycle of ten years, and is regarded as one of the most important open-air exhibitions of the world.

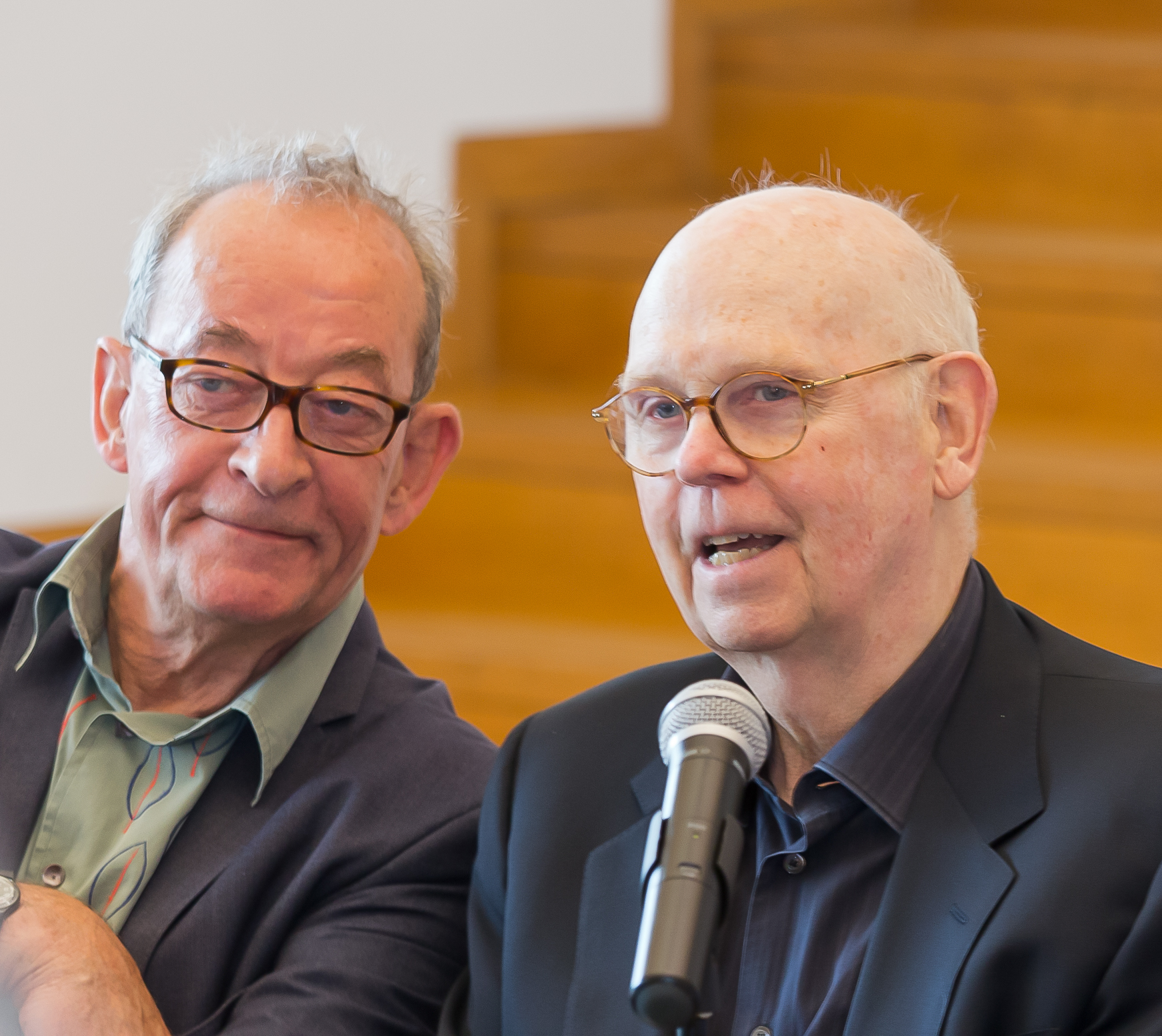
König (l.) and Claes Oldenburg, at Museum Ludwig, 2012

König became professor at the Düsseldorf Art Academy in 1985. He founded Portikus, an exhibition hall for contemporary art in Frankfurt, in 1987. He taught as professor at the Städelschule in Frankfurt from 1988 to 2000, heading it as its rector from 1989. From 2000 to 2012, he was director of the Museum Ludwig in Cologne.

== Personal life ==
König was married to Ilka Schellenberg who was the daughter of Walter Schellenberg. Their son is the New York City-based art gallerist Leo Koenig. He was later married to the actress Edda Köchl-König. Their son Johann König is a Berlin-based art dealer. The marriage ended in divorce. His third wife, Barbara Weiss, a gallerist from Berlin, died in 2016. His fourth wife was Heidi Specker. König lived in New York, Antwerp, Frankfurt, Cologne, and finally in Berlin.

König died in Berlin on 9 August 2024, at the age of 80.

== Legacy ==
Before his death, König donated around 50 works from his art collection to Museum Ludwig, including pieces by Pawel Althamer, Maria Eichhorn, Isa Genzken, Dan Graham, Thomas Hirschhorn, Jenny Holzer, Richard Long and Jeremy Deller. In 2024, shortly after his death, around 400 works sold from König's private holdings – including works by Richard Artschwager, Thomas Bayrle, William Copley, On Kawara and Sigmar Polke – raised around €6 million ($6.5 million) during a series of sales that took place at the headquarters of Van Ham auction house in Cologne. Kawara’s May 7, 1967, the sale’s top lot, went for €1.06 million with fees, setting a record for one of the artist’s date-centered works

== Exhibitions ==
- 1966: Claes Oldenburg, at Moderna Museet in Stockholm
- 1968: Andy Warhol, Stockholm
- 1973: A. R. Penck
- 1974: On Kawara
- 1976: Aspects of Recent Art from Europe, Sperone Westwater Fischer, New York City
- 1976: Donald Judd
- 1976: Michael Asher
- 1981: Westkunst. Zeitgenössische Kunst seit 1939, Rheinhallen Cologne, with Laszlo Glozer
- 1984: von hier aus – Zwei Monate neue deutsche Kunst in Düsseldorf, hall 13 of the Messe Düsseldorf
- 1993: Der zerbrochene Spiegel, Kunsthalle Wien, Deichtorhallen Hamburg, with Hans Ulrich Obrist
- 1993: Gerhard Richter
- 1997: Gregor Schneider
- 1997: Sultan's Pool, Jerusalem Biennale
- 2000: Art program of the Expo 2000 in Hanover
- 2003: Austrian pavilion at the 50th Venice Biennale
- 2014: (as chief curator) Manifesta 10, Saint Petersburg

== Awards ==
- 2000: Award for Curatorial Excellence from the Center for Curatorial Studies, Bard College
- 2005: Honorary doctorate Nova Scotia College of Art and Design in Halifax
- 2009: Lifetime Achievement Award from the Guggenheim Foundation
