= Laboratorium (art exhibition) =

Laboratorium was a contemporary art exhibition curated by Barbara Vanderlinden and Hans Ulrich Obrist at Fotomuseum Antwerp, the Century City building and various other locations in Antwerp, Belgium, from 27 June to 3 October 1999.

The interdisciplinary exhibition staged relations between an urban network of scientists, artists, dancers and writers and questioned the role of the studio and the laboratory as sites of artistic, scientific and knowledge production.

== Background ==
In 1998, preparations started for the 1999 celebrations of the 400th anniversary of Anthony van Dyck's birth. In honour of this event Roomade, the Brussels-based arts organisation founded Barbara Vanderlinden and Antwerpen Open, set out to create a contemporary art program in Antwerp. This was conceived of as a contemporaneous reflection on the role the 'studio' in art and a tribute to the history of famous artist studio's in Antwerp of which van Dyck's and Peter-Paul Rubens are the most prominent examples. It is this city's role in the development of such studios that inspired 'Laboratorium'. The creative aspect of the curatorial role led Barbara Vanderlinden to propose an alternative to the traditional object-oriented art exhibition by creating an exhibition program that took the form of a year long, functioning artist's studio. She fulfilled this aim by setting up a series of exceptional projects that were carried out in defunct office spaces throughout the city of Antwerp. These culminated and merged in 'Laboratorium', a large-scale interdisciplinary exhibition-project "in which the scientific laboratory and the artist's studio were explored on the basis of the various concepts and disciplines". It brought together the work of sixty-six artists and scientists devoted to research and experimentation and was co-curated by Barbara Vanderlinden and Hans Ulrich Obrist.

The preparations for the exhibition started with "a method that is often used for historical exhibitions, but too rarely for contemporary ones" the curators created think tank to develop ideas. This included artists and scientists such as the French sociologist Bruno Latour, the German-Belgian artist Carsten Höller, the American artist Matt Mullican, and the Belgian scientist Luc Steels. The organizer Bruno Verbergt was closely involved with the curators. "The discussion revolved around questions such as the following: How can we attempt to bridge the gap between the specialised vocabulary of science, art and the general interest of the audience, between the expertise of the skilled practitioner and the concerns and preconceptions of the interested audience? What is the meaning of the laboratories? What is the meaning of experiments? When do experiments become public and when does the result of an experiment reach public consensus? Is rendering public what happens inside the laboratory of scientist and the studio of the artist a contradiction in terms? These and other questions were the beginning of an interdisciplinary project starting from the 'workplace' where artists and scientist experiment and work freely."

== Artists exhibiting ==
- Mark Bain
- Lewis Baltz
- Oladélé Bamgboyé
- Thomas Bayrle
- Jef Cornelis
- Anne Daems
- Tacita Dean
- Lionel Estève
- Jan Fabre
- Harun Farocki
- Hans-Peter Feldmann
- Peter Fischli & David Weiss
- Michel François
- Frank O. Gehry
- Liam Gillick
- Joseph Grigely (in collaboration with Amy Vogel, Anne Walsh, Stephen Baker, Robin Morrissey, and Alexandra Trencsèni)
- Carsten Höller
- In situ production
- Henrik Plenge Jakobsen
- Alexander Kluge
- Koo Jeong-a
- Rem Koolhaas
- Laboratoire Agit-Art (in collaboration with Abdoulaye Ba, Jean Michel Bruyére, Djib Diëdhiou, Bara Diokhané, Mamadou Traoré Diop, Pape Omar Diop, Massamba Lam, Magayé Niang, Issa Samb, and El Hadji Sy)
- Xavier Leroy
- Armin Linke
- Adam Lowe
- Ken Lum
- Sarat Maharaj
- Erwan Mahéo
- Kobe Matthys
- Jean-Charles Massera
- Bruce Mau
- Jonas Mekas
- Gustav Metzger
- Jean-Luc Moulène
- Matt Mullican
- Gabriel Orozco
- Panamarenko
- Jason Rhoades
- Martha Rosler
- Rupert Sheldrake
- H. Otto Sibum
- Luc Steels
- Isabelle Stengers
- Meg Stuart
- Rosemarie Trockel
- Francisco J. Varela
- Lawrence Weiner
- David Western
