= Roomade =

Arts organisation from Brussels, Belgium

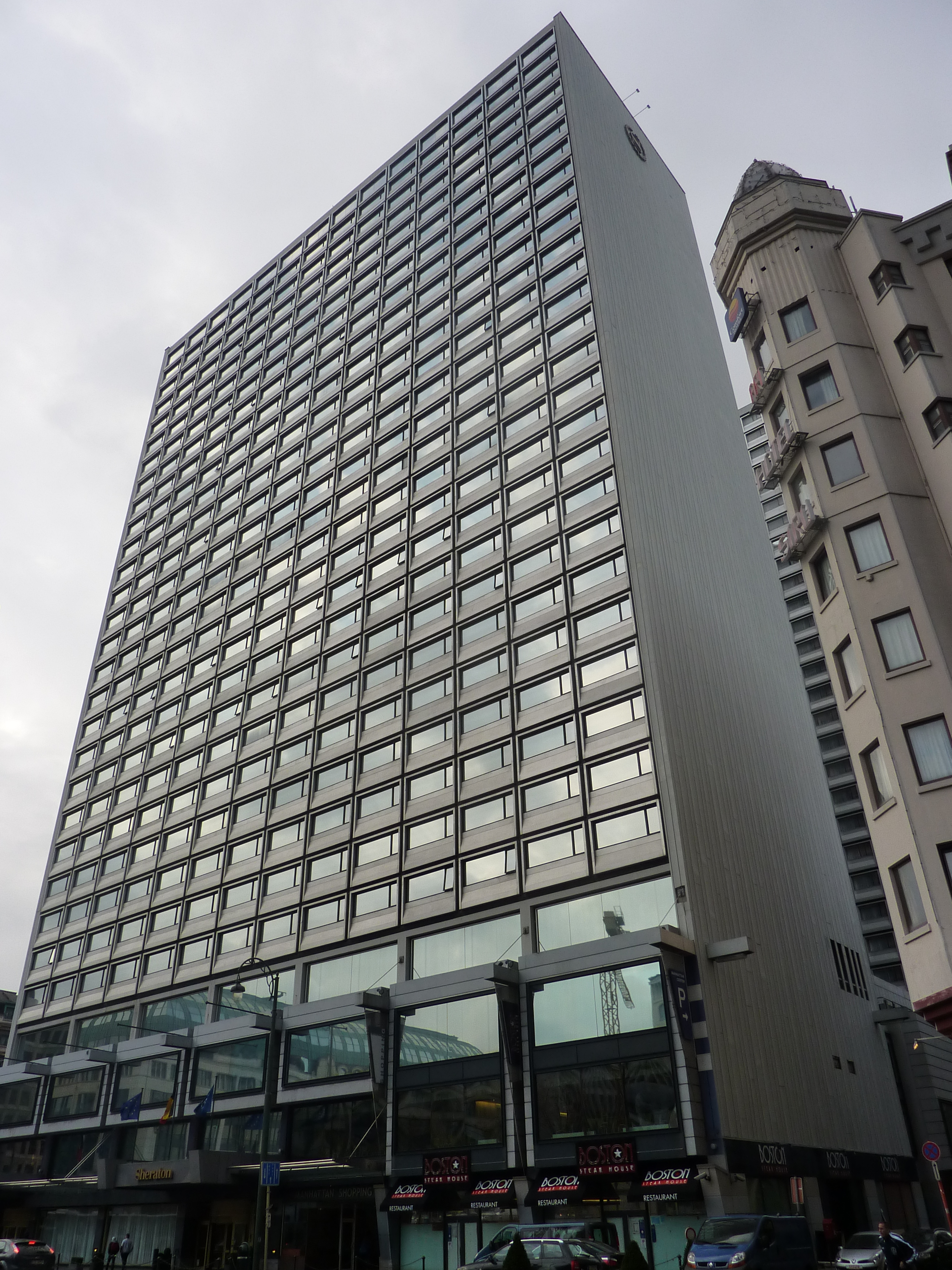
- Roomade, Office Tower Manhattan Center Projects, Manhattan Center, Brussels, 1997
- Formation: 1996
- Founders: Barbara Vanderlinden, Johannes Van Heddegem
- Dissolved: 2006
- Type: Nonprofit Arts organisation
- Registration no.: BE456466855
- Location: Brussels, Belgium
- Fields: Contemporary art
- Artistic director: Barbara Vanderlinden (1996–2006)

Roomade was a Brussels-based arts organization founded in 1996 by Barbara Vanderlinden. Under her direction and curation until 2006, it became known for commissioning and producing a series of groundbreaking exhibition projects and publications.

Roomade distinguished itself by fostering collaborations between artists, philosophers, and other intellectuals on projects that defied traditional commercialization or museum exhibition formats.

== History ==
In the mid-1990s, Brussels lacked several vital functions and spaces for contemporary visual art. Roomade intended to fill this gap and take creative action on this terrain vague.

The idea for Roomade was developed in 1995, primarily by Barbara Vanderlinden (founder). It was supported early on by international artists, such as American artist-curator Fareed Armaly, who came up with its name "Roomade," a contraction of the words "room" and "made," to express the ideas of "making room," and creating hospitable spaces for the encounter and connection between art, the sciences, the city, and the public.

De Witte Raaf, an art newspaper that had its offices there, described Roomade as an organisation "for the production of art projects outside the traditional exhibition circuit, embedded in a specific social situation and intended for a new audience." In 2001, Knack wrote, "The emphasis is always on elements of the artistic or scientific trajectory, which fit less easily within the structures of the current art world. Usually, famous people are invited – such as Matt Mullican, Bruce Mau, Bruno Latour, Chantal Mouffe… – but Roomade always tries to introduce a slight shift in the dominant public image of these figures."

Roomade officially became a non-profit organization in 1996. To solidify its leadership, Vanderlinden assembled a distinguished board of directors. Roomade attracted support from various government bodies. The Flemish Community, the Flemish Community Commission (VGC), the European Commission's Culture 2000 program, the City of Antwerp, and Antwerpen Open VZW all contributed to Roomade's financial foundation.

Initially the organisation rented modest quarters housed in the cloister of the Jesuit fathers in Brussels (Saint-Josse-ten-Noode). In 1999 Roomade moved to a former banana ripening building from the 1950s in the Koopliedenstraat in Brussels where it had offices, a library, an archive, a lecture hall, and a presentation room from 1999 to 2006. The building also housed the offices of the art newspaper De Witte Raaf (The White Raven) and Argos Center for Audiovisual Arts.

In 2006, Roomade's board of directors made a decision to transition the organization's resources towards launching the inaugural Brussels Biennial, marking the end of Roomade as a legal entity.

== Notable projects ==
=== Matt Mullican Under Hypnosis, 1996 ===
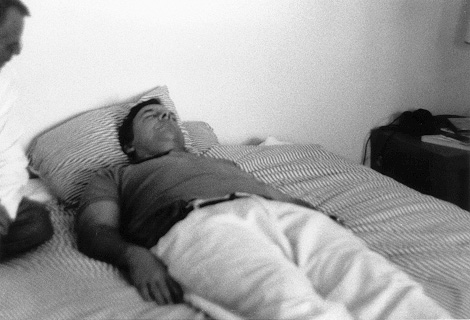
Matt Mullican Under Hypnosis, Roomade (Lunatheater studio), Brussels

Fifteen public performances were staged at different locations in Brussels in 1996 and recorded on video. They were exceptional, in that they were carried out by the artist under hypnosis and had such titles as Making a Drawing as a 4-Year-Old, Looking for a Picture and Entering a Picture or simply Smelling. They were like reconstructions of the artist Matt Mullican's identity, built from memories and images stored in his subconscious to be addressed during the performances, outside censoring consciousness. The curiosity of what happens when critical consciousness is suspended was precisely what Mullican was after in these performances. All performances took place in various private and public locations in Brussels and on Friday 3 May 1997 Mullican performed "Under Hypnosis" in the Zuilenzaal of the Arenberg Institute in Louvain. It was the first time since the late 1970s that Mullican showed his hypnosis performance to an audience.

=== Office Tower Projects series (1996–1999) ===
==== Office Tower Manhattan Center Projects, 1996–1997 ====
This project took place in the Manhattan Tower annex Sheraton Hotel, a major building in the North District of Brussels. On request of Roomade it made a number of its floors available for its exhibition projects. Titled On the Desperate and long neglected need for small events, the project included continuous video projections by Marie José Burki lit up in 4 storefronts on the Bolwerklaan from 7 p.m. until morning. On the windows appeared greatly enlarged bird cages containing a finch, which is constantly bouncing from one perch to the other. On the 12th floor, ten video projections were continuously shown of the performances under hypnosis that Matt Mullican performed in the previous year in Brussels and Louvain on behalf of Roomade. On the 26th floor one could find Agency by Kobe Matthys, a module composed of plasterboards with TV, sound system and some sofas. Participating artists and projects: Marie-José Burki: Exposure / Exposure Daylight (ground floor); Matt Mullican Under Hypnosis (12th floor); Regina Möller: Meinen Arbeitsplatz gibt es noch nicht (My Job Hasn't been invented yet) (20th floor); Kobe Matthys: Agentschap (26th floor).

==== Century Center Project, 1999 ====
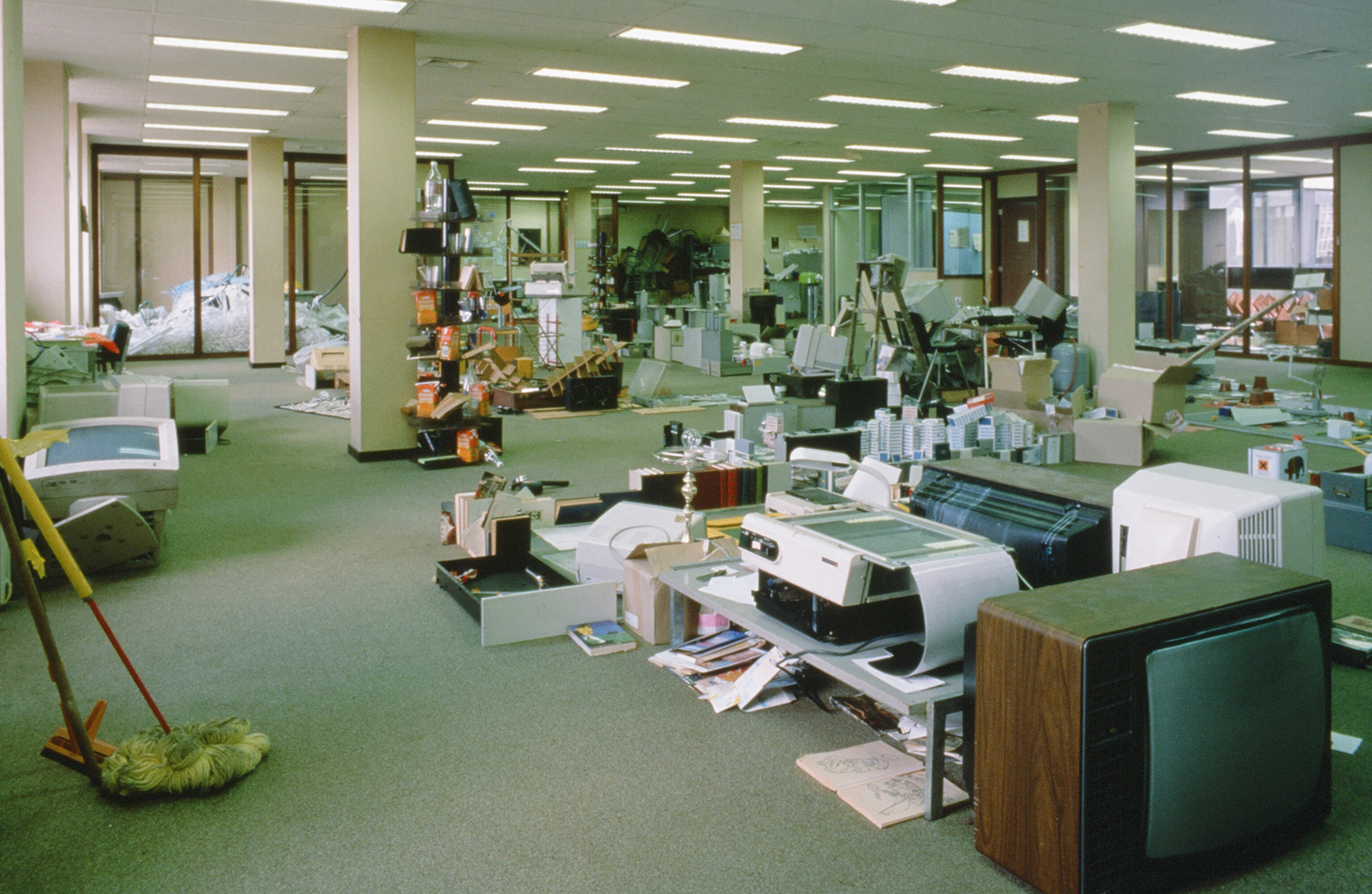
Tomoko Takahashi, Office Work at Century Center, Roomade - Century Center Project, Antwerp, 1999

In 1999, Antwerp Open, an urban culture unit of the City of Antwerp, invited Barbara Vanderlinden from Roomade to conceive the contemporary visual arts section in the context of the Van Dyck year. In addition to the Laboratorium exhibition and the Ambient City project, she started the Century Center Project, a series of exhibitions on vacant office floors of the Century Center, London Tower, De Keyserlei 58–60 in 2018 Antwerp. For a month, the fourth second of the Century Center was the solitary workspace of the Korean Koo Jeong-a. The result was a poetic installation with countless and sometimes almost imperceptible intervention by Koo. The most striking 'things' were put together scale models of a postal, telecommunications and station building. About this project, Luc Lambrecht wrote in the Dutch daily newspaper De Morgen: "For the general public, it remains a problematic exhibition: there is little to see, but with a little fingertip a whole world can open up. It is precisely in the non-artistic nature of this intervention that lies the poetry that clings to the ordinary and neglected detail of everyday life." After a presentation by Koo Jeong-a on the second floor, the exhibition Office Project by Tomoko Takahashi opened on the fourth floor.

=== Ambient City, 1999 ===
Ambient City - Transient RADIO was a month long transient radio in the city of Antwerp. Conceived by Tommi Grönlund, Pettri Nisunen, Iiro Auterinnen, Matti Knaapi and commissioned by Roomade. At night, when passing the KMSK Koninklijke Museum voor Schone Kunsten in Antwerp, a huge sculpture could be seen lighting up on the museum roof. The dancing light captured the cadence of the live broadcast programs of Ambient City, a radio experiment by a number of Finnish artists. Anyone who wanted to listen in to the overcrowded program that ran day and night could simply tune in to frequency Antwerp 93.9.

=== Laboratorium, 1999 ===
The last exhibition that Roomade conceived for the Van Dyck year was the Laboratorium exhibition project of the curators Barbara Vanderlinden and Hans Ulrich Obrist. The purpose of "Laboratorium" was to "identify the limits and the possibilities of the places where culture and knowledge are made", by setting up in the city "networks linking the very specialised works of scientists, artists, dancers and writers." It intended to exhibit the places where science and art are practiced: laboratories and workshops or studios. Since these are production sites, where processes are underway, there could be no question of a ready-made exhibition. Laboratorium did not posit any premise about the relations between art and science. It was based on an encounter between the working processes of artists and scientists in their studios, workshops, and laboratories, which were open to the public for the occasion. The discussions resulted in a network to which the public was connected. Travelled as Laboratorium Archives (in collaboration with Nico Dockx and Kobe Matthys) to Z33, Hasselt, 2002; as Laboratorium (as part of Experiment Marathon Reykjavik, curated by Hans Ulrich Obrist, co-director of Exhibitions and Programs and Director of International Projects, Serpentine Galleries, and artist Olafur Eliasson) to Reykjavik Art Museum, Reykjavik where the archive of the exhibition Laboratorium was presented on a framework by Yona Friedman.

=== Indiscipline, 2000 ===
Indiscipline were eight "presentations" from artists, psychoanalysts, philosophers, theatre makers and others throughout the city of Brussels and at the Center Brussels 2000 and on the website of Roomade. The idea was to challenge the intellectuals to participate in the creative process of exhibition making and to place their intellectual findings into direct publicness. On the other hand, Indiscipline invited the artists to go beyond the language of their respective disciplines. In doing so, the project was "undisciplined" and moved between the structures of theater, happening, exhibitions, workshops and the internet and demonstrated the complexity of culture and cultural production. The project was co-curated by Barbara Vanderlinden and Jens Hoffmann. Participants included Richard Foreman, Suely Rolnik, Chantal Mouffe, Everlyn Nicodemus, Liam Gillick, Boris Groys, Martha Rosler, and Oladélé Ajiboyé Bamgboyé.

=== Carsten Höller: The Boudewijn Experiment, 2000–2001 ===
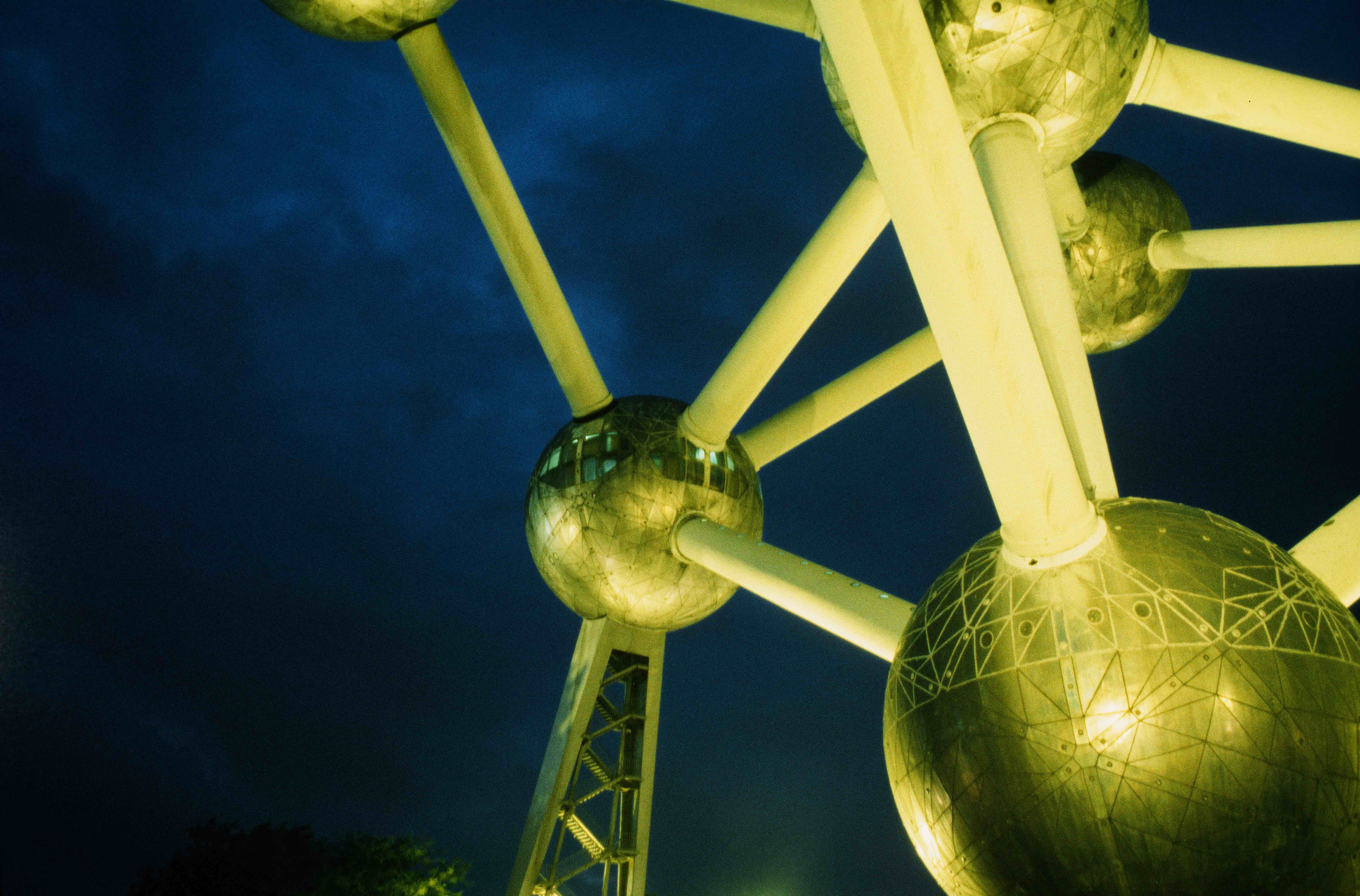
Carsten Höller, The Baudouin Boudewijn Experiment, Roomade - Atomium, Brussels, 2001

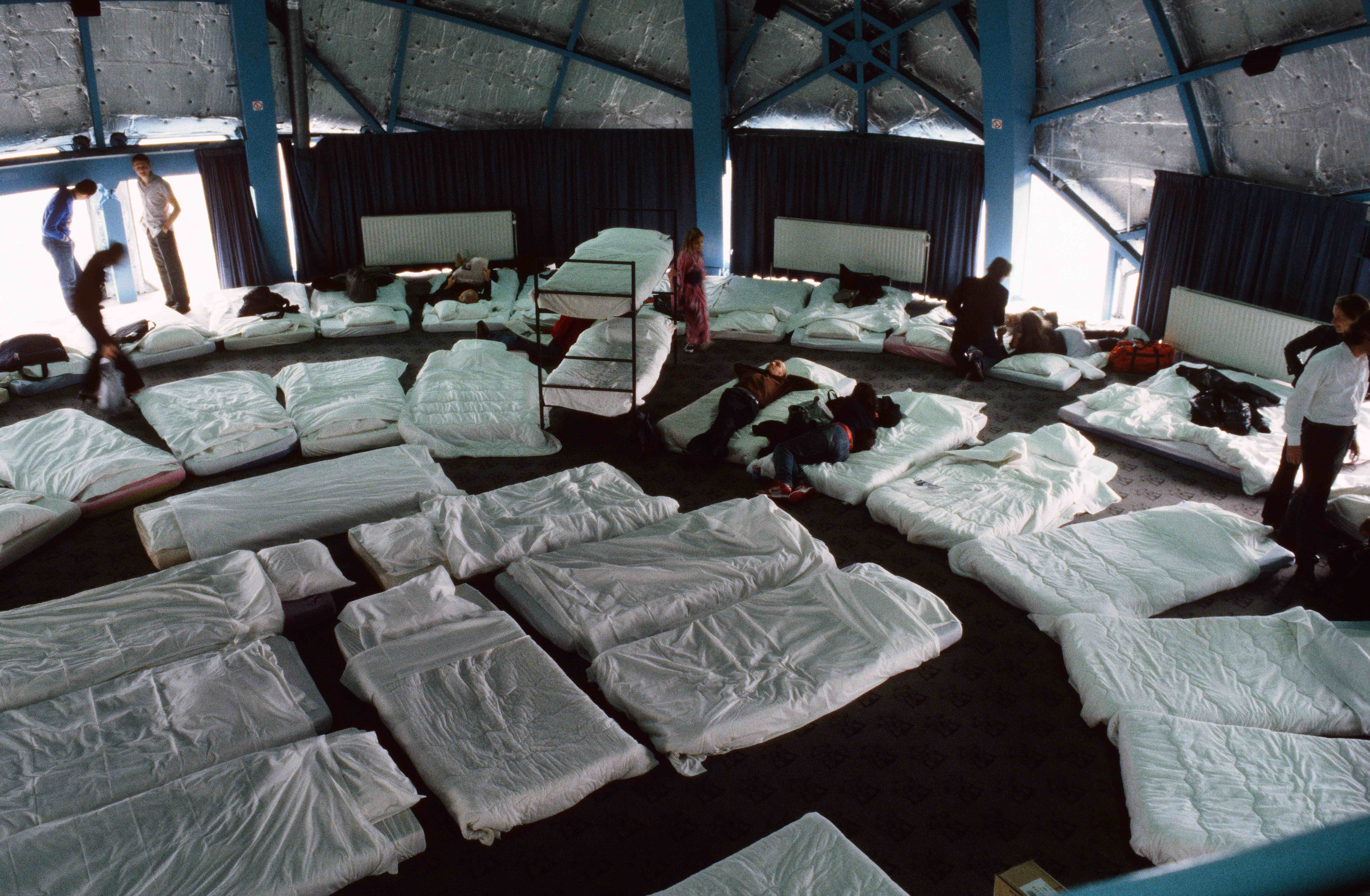
Carsten Höller, The Baudouin Boudewijn Experiment, Roomade - Atomium, Brussels, 2001

The Baudouin/Boudewijn Experiment took place in one of Belgium's most famous architectural landmarks: the Atomium. Built as the Belgian Pavilion for the 1958 World Fair in Brussels, the Atomium imitates the structure of an atom, and is made up of nine spheres connected by tubes. In the Brussels and European Conference Rooms, situated in the central sphere, a space was set up to accommodate 100 people who were invited to spend twenty-four hours in the space, stepping out of their usual, "productive" lives for one day. From 10:00 AM on 27 September until 10:00 AM on 28 September 2001, the space was closed to the outside world. The necessary infrastructure such as furniture, food, sanitary installations and safety measures were provided. Though no particular programme or means of entertainment was suggested, participants were free to bring with them what they wished. Essentially, the experiment was an experience what happens when people are freed from their usual constraints and yet collectively confined to a particular space and time. The Baudouin/Boudewijn Experiment was not documented by means of film or video; the only "recordings" were the memories of the participants, and were disseminated through the stories they told after the event. The experiment was thus completely unscientific, since objectivity was not the aim. Rather, it was a unique opportunity to experience together the possibilities of escape from one's daily routine, to participate in a unique event with an unclear outcome. Those taking part in the experiment were following the example of the late H.M. Baudouin, King of Belgium, who was declared incapable of governing the country for twenty-four hours on 4 April 1990, and thus suspended his royal activities during this period.

== The Manifesta Decade, 2005 ==
In tandem with its contemporary art projects, Roomade undertook a series of critical studies that examine exhibition practices and their histories. The Manifesta Decade, Debates on Contemporary Art Exhibitions and Biennials in Post-Wall Europe (2005; co-published by MIT Press) marked the inauguration of this series.

== Exhibition history (selection) ==
Solo exhibitions

- Gert Verhoeven: Papa m'a + préproduction, Roomade, Brialmontstraat, Brussels, January 31–end date unknown, 1997.
- Matt Mullican Under Hypnosis, various locations in Brussels and Louvain-Leuven, April 28–May 4, 1996. Including Lunatheater (appartement 604), Brussels, April 28, 1996; Nieuwstraat-Rue Neuve, Brussels, May 1, 1996; Plateau Theater, Brussels, May 2, 1996; Arenberg Institute, Louvain-Leuven, May 3, 1996; Lunatheater (appartement 604), Brussels, May 4, 1996.
- Marie-José Burki: Exposure / Exposure Daylight, Grimbergen Airfield, Grimbergen, August 30, 1997.
- Carsten Höller: The Baudouin/Boudewijn Experiment. A Deliberate, Non-Fatalistic, Large-Scale Group Experiment in Deviation, Centrum Brussel 2000 and divers locations in Brussels, October 26–December 3, 2000 (canceled). Restaged at the Atomium, Eeuwfeestlaan, 1020 Brussels, September 27–28, 2001, 24 hours from 10 AM to 10 AM.
- Boris Groys: The Art Judgement Show, ZKM | Zentrum für Kunst und Medientechnologie Karlsruhe, January 10, 2001, and Roomade, April–May, 2001. Traveled as Poglej in presodi / The Art Judgement Show to Mala Galerija, April 11–May 27, 2001; The seventh international art fair Art Moscow, May 15–20, 2003.

Group exhibitions

- Office Tower Manhattan Center Project I: On the Desperate and long neglected need for small events, Office Tower Manhattan Center, Brussels, February 20–March 30, 1997. Participants: Marie-José Burki: Exposure / Exposure Daylight (ground floor); Matt Mullican Under Hypnosis (12th floor); Regina Möller: Meinen Arbeitsplatz gibt es noch nicht (My Job Hasn't been invented yet) (20th floor); Kobe Matthys: Agentschap (26th floor).
- Office Tower Manhattan Center Project II: Inmitten der dingen aber im centrum con nichts, Office Tower Manhattan Center, Brussels, December 12, 1997. Participants: Jan Fabre & Ilya Kabako: Een ontmoeting - Vstrecha; Barbara Vanderlinden and Hans-Ulrich Obrist: Een reflectie over tentoonstellingsplekken (Horizon Club, 30e verdieping); Andreas Slominski: Bird Feed.
- Office Tower Manhattan Center Project III, Office Tower Manhattan Center, Brussels, March 3–May 3, 1998. Participants: Anne Daems; Regina Möller: Meinen Arbeitsplatz gibt es noch nicht (My Job Hasn't been invented yet) (20th floor); Tobias Rehberger: Missing Colors II (26th floor).
- Fascinerende Facetten van Vlaanderen. Twee uur breed of twee uur lang (Fascinating Faces of Flanders, Two Hours Wide or Two Hours Long), Centro Cultural de Bélem, Lissabon, June 20–October 25, 1998. Traveled to KSMS Koninklijk Museum voor Schone Kunsten, Antwerp, December 6, 1998 – January 31, 1999. Participants: Marcel Broodthaers, Jef Cornelis, Anne Daems, Raoul De Keyser, Lili Dujourie, Lionel Estève, Jan Fabre and Ilya Kabakov, Jef Geys, Johan Grimonprez, Ann Veronica Janssen, Aglaia Konrad, Franciska Lambrechts, Martin Margiela, Kobe Matthys, Everlyn Nicodemus, Honoré d'O, Panamarenko, Roger Raveel, Joëlle Teurlinckx, Luc Tuymans, Jan Vercruysse, Gert Verhoeven.
- Ambient City - Transient RADIO, KMSM Koninklijke Museum voor Schone Kunsten, Antwerp, February 25–March 3, 1999.
- Laboratorium, Provinciaal Museum voor Fotografie and the city of Antwerp, June 26–October 3, 1999. Travelled as Laboratorium Archives (in collaboration with Nico Dockx and Kobe Matthys) to Z33, Hasselt, 2002; as Laboratorium Archive (as part of Experiment Marathon Reykjavik, curated by Hans Ulrich Obrist and artist Olafur Eliasson) to Reykjavik Art Museum, Reykjavik, May 15–August 24, 2008. Participants: Bruno Latour; Matt Mullican; Mark Bain; Lewis Baltz; Oladélé Ajiboyé Bamgboyé; Thomas Bayrle; Wiebe E. Bijker; James Lee Byars; Harry M. Collins; Jef Cornelis; Anne Daems; Tacita Dean; Lionel Estève; Jan Fabre; Harun Farocki; Hans-Peter Feldmann; Peter Fischli and David Weiss; Michel François; Peter Galison; Frank O. Gehry; Liam Gillick; Joseph Grigely; Carsten Höller; In situ production; Henrik Plenge Jakobsen; Alexander Kluge; Koo Jeong-a; Rem Koolhaas; Laboratoire Agit-Art; Adam Lowe; Ken Lum; Armin Linke; Sarat Maharaj; Erwan Mahéo; Jean-Charles Massera; Kobe Matthys; Bruce Mau; Jonas Mekas; Gustav Metzger; Jean-Luc Moulène; Matt Mullican; Gabriel Orozco; Panamarenko; Marko Peljhan; Jason Rhoades; Martha Rosler; Xavier Le Roy; Rupert Sheldrake; Luc Steels; Isabelle Stengers; Meg Stuart; Tomoko Takahashi; Rosemarie Trockel; Francisco J. Varela; Lawrence Weiner."
- Spreken is waarnemen, is voorstellen, is leren (To Speak is to Perceive is to Present is to Learn), Roomade, Koopliedenstraat 60–62, Brussels, October 28–November 28, 1999. Participants (selection): Vito Acconci, John Baldessari, Robert Barry, Georg Baselitz, Thomas Bayrle, Dara Birnbaum, Christian Boltanski, Saskia Bos, Günter Brus, Christ Burden, Herbert Brandl, Marianne Brouwer, Chris Burden, Jean-Marc Bustamente, Michael Clegg & Martin Guttmann, Hans-Peter Feldmann, Andrea Fraser, Felix Gonzalez-Torres, Douglas Gorden, Dan Graham, Jan Hoet, Carsten Höller, Max Hollein, Jenny Holzer, Mike Kelly, Kasper König, Jeff Koons, Joseph Kosuth, Maria Lassnig, Bernanrd Marcadé, Paul McCarthy, Christian Philippe Müller, Matt Mullican, Michelangelo Pistoletto, Herman Nitsch, Tony Oursler, Arnuf Rainer, Charles Ray, Stella Rolig, August Ruhs, Jérome Sans, Heim Steinbach, James Turell, Meyer Vaisman, Jan Vercruysse, Lawrence Weiner, Franz West, Denys Zacharopoulos, Slavoj Zizek.
- Indiscipline Centrum Brussel 2000 and divers locations in Brussels, October 26–December 3, 2000. Live streaming to Split and BAK Maastricht. Participants: Richard Foreman, Suely Rolnik, Chantal Mouffe (with Anette Baldauf, Katharina Weigartner, Diedrich Diedrichsen, DeeDee Halleck, Doreen Massey, Everlyn Nicodemus, Janos Kovacs, and Kofi Taha), Liam Gillick, Boris Groys, Martha Rosler, Oladélé Ajiboyé Bamgboyé
