= Mullican =

Mullican is a surname. Notable people with the surname include:

- Lee Mullican (1919–1998), American painter and art teacher
- Matt Mullican (born 1951), American-Venezuelan artist, son of Lee
- Moon Mullican (1909–1967), American country and western singer, songwriter, and pianist
