= Lionel Estève =

French visual artist (born 1967)

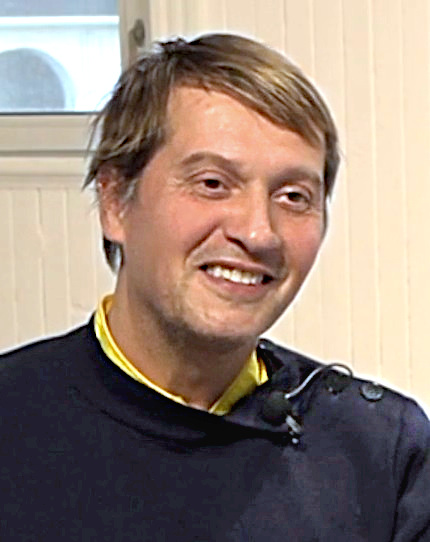
- Estève (2022)
- Born: 30 July 1967 (age 58); Lyon, Auvergne-Rhône-Alpes
- Education: École nationale supérieure des beaux-arts de Lyon; Free University of Brussels
- Known for: Installation, sculpture, drawing
- Awards: SABAM Awards, distinguished in Plastic Arts, 2016

Lionel Estève (born July 30, 1967) is a French sculptor and visual artist recognized for his work using a wide range of materials, often including modest, found, or natural objects, grounded in geometric abstraction and kinetic art. His work is characterized by a poetic and exploratory approach, frequently crossing media and resisting conventional classification. Estève’s sculptures and installations engage with human perception and the relationship between humans and the natural environment, emphasizing materiality, movement, and sensory experience.

Born in Lyon, Estève has lived and worked in Brussels for over thirty years and maintains a secondary studio in southeastern France. His work has been exhibited in galleries including Baronian Xippas in Brussels and Perrotin in Paris. Since the late-1990s, his work has been exhibited widely, most notably at Musée d’Art Moderne de la Ville de Paris, Centre Pompidou in Paris, MOMA PS1 and The Museum of Modern Art in New York.

In 2023, Estève presented a major solo exhibition titled Les Saisons at the Musée des Arts Contemporains de la Fédération Wallonie-Bruxelles – Grand-Hornu (Belgium). For this exhibition, he incorporated materials such as tulle, beads, sequins, plants, river stones, and gold leaf. The exhibition included both new and existing works arranged to evoke a progression from winter to summer, night to day, and dry warmth to wet cold, reflecting his engagement with climate and seasonal change.

In 2020, Estève published his first autobiographical story entitled Mourir. Estève studied at École nationale supérieure des beaux-arts de Lyon and Philologie Romane at the Free University of Brussels. He lives and works in Brussels and Southeastern France.

== Work ==
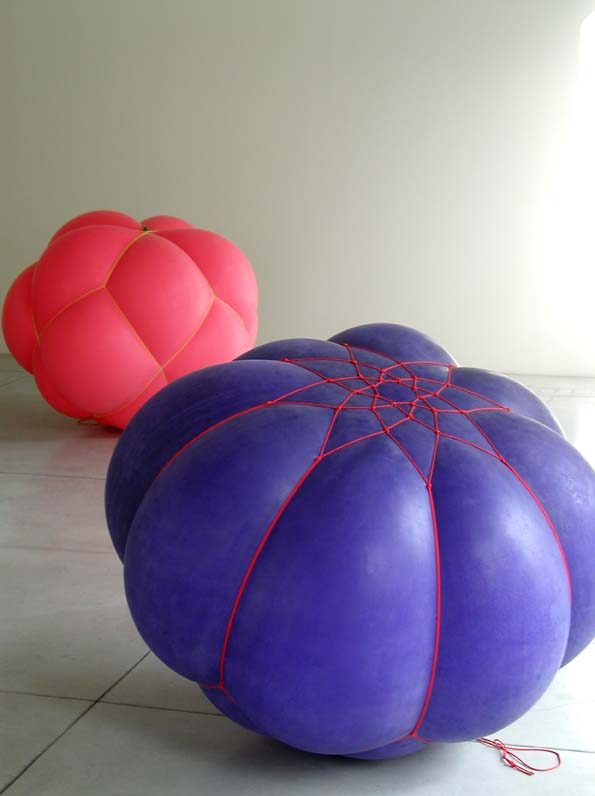
Lionel Estève, Ballon rose, 2004; Ballon blue, 2004 Balls, net, and balloons, approx. 120 cm, each

Estève defines all his work as a sculpture. His work is both figurative and abstract and is generally inspired by motifs found in the natural environment or through the experience of vision and perception. His signature sculptures are playful and show clear affinities with kinetic art and the Zero movement. The elements of movement in the work of Estève unquestionably refers to the work of classics such as Jan Schoonhoven and Walter Leblanc in which the flat surface gives rise to visual illusions and transient effects. In his work, he often emphasizes space through, among other things, mobiles in colored plexiglass or fine mesh in steel wire. His light colorful structures often vibrate and are often sensual. He experiments with various materials and handcrafted techniques to create works that include different forms of art: collages, assemblage (art), sculptures, kinetic art sculptures, and mobile (sculpture).

== Exhibitions ==
=== Solo exhibitions ===
Estève has been the focus of several solo and retrospectives exhibitions at various international institutions, including Lionel Estève: Les Saisons at the Musée des Arts Contemporains de la Fédération Wallonie-Bruxelles – Grand-Hornu (Belgium) in 2023; Lionel Estève: Le ventre de la terre at the Musée du Verre in Charleroi (Marcinelle) in 2017; Lionel Estève: Poussières urbaines et sculptures plates at Espace 251 Nord (La Comète) in Liege in 2016; Lionel Estève; Un nuage sur mes épaules at the Blueproject Foundation in Barcelona in 2015; Lionel Estève; Rétrospective at De La Charge in Brussels in 2015; Lionel Estève; Vivre en pensée at Les Eglises, centre d'art contemporain de la ville de Chelles in Chelles in 2015; Lionel Estève; Teenagers are Always Right at the Château de Vert Mont in Rueil-Malmaison in 2010; Lionel Estève: Lucky Colors at Louis Vuitton in Las Vegas in 2009; Lionel Estève: I can talk to my cat / Thinking what others are thinking at the Centre for Fine Arts, Brussels in 2008; Lionel Estève at the De Vereniging DD, Museum Dhondt-Dhaenens in Deurle in Belgium in 2008; Lionel Estève: Fleurs de Rocailles at the Herzliya Museum of Art in Herzliya (Israel) in 2006; Migrateurs: Lionel Estève, curated by Hans-Ulrich Obrist and directed by Suzanne Pagé et Laurence Bossé at the Musée d’Art Moderne de la Ville de Paris, Paris in 2003.

=== Group exhibitions ===
Estève's work has been included in various group exhibitions in institutions and museums internationally. In 1998, he was invited to show at Centre Culturel de Belem in Lisbon in the exhibition O fascínio das faces da Flandres, 58/98: duas horas de viagem para duas de tamanho. The exhibition traveled to Koninklijk Museum voor Schone Kunsten in Antwerp and included work by, amongst others, Marcel Broodthaers, Jan Vercruysse, and Luc Tuymans. In 1999 he participated in Antwerp in the Laboratorium (art exhibition), curated by Hans-Ulrich Obrist and Barbara Vanderlinden, and in 1999 he participated in the survey exhibition Generation Z, curated by Klaus Biesenbach, Alanna Heiss, and Barbara Vanderlinden at the MoMA PS1 in New York. In 2000, Estève participated in La ville, le jardin, la mémoire, an exhibition curated by Laurence Bossé, Carolyn Christov-Bakargiev, and Hans-Ulrich Obrist at the Villa Medicis in Rome. In 2006–07 his work was presented in New York at The Museum of Modern Art in the survey exhibition An Eye on Europe, an exhibition curated by Deborah Wye. In 2015, Estève and the poet Sandra Lim considered 'life for Adam and Eve after the fall, as a banal reality that begins to crystallize.' The work and poem were published in T, The New York Times Style Magazine.

== Collections ==
- Centre Georges Pompidou, Paris, France
- CNAP Centre national des arts plastiques, National Centre for Visual Arts, Paris, France
- Fonds régional d’art contemporain Bretagne, Rennes, France
- Musée des Arts Décoratifs, Namur, Belgium
- Macedonian Museum of Contemporary Art, Thessaloniki, Greece
- Parlement de la federation Wallonie-Bruxelles, Brussels, Belgium
- Thalielab, La Fondation Thalie, Brussels, Belgium
- Fonds municipal d'art contemporain de la Ville de Paris, Paris, France
- The Museum of Modern Art, New York, US

== Recognition ==
In 2016, Estève received the SABAM Award for his distinguished contribution to the visual arts.

== Personal life ==
Estève was born in Lyon on July 30, 1967. He studied visual art at École nationale supérieure des beaux-arts de Lyon and Roman Philologie at the Free University of Brussels. Since 1997, Estève has been living and working in Brussels and a small village in the Drôme, a department in Southeastern France where his grandfather was born.

== See also ==
- List of French artists
