= Barbara Vanderlinden =

Belgian art historian, curator and director

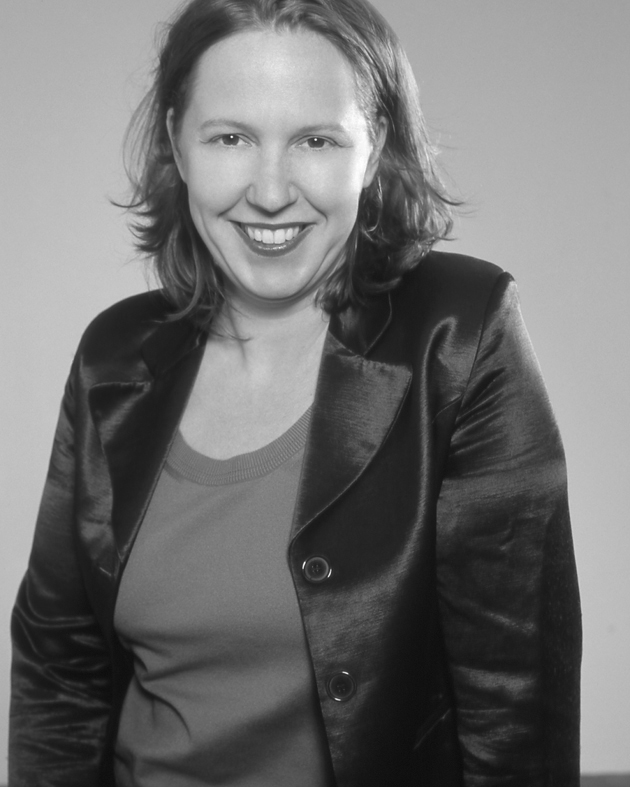
- Vanderlinden in 2004
- Born: Barbara Vanderlinden
- Education: Vrije Universiteit Brussel
- Occupations: Curator, writer, art historian

Barbara Vanderlinden is a curator, writer, and art historian with more than 30 years of international experience. She holds master’s degrees in philosophy and art. Emerging in the 1990s, she was part of a generation of curators who redefined the exhibition as a critical, experimental, and historiographic form. Her work examines how art is narrated, first through exhibitions as discursive formats and more recently through artist monographs as evolving projects. She uses the concept of an artwork's "biography" to trace its creation, circulation, reception, and reinterpretation over time, seeking to rethink approaches to writing, curating, and conceptualizing art history.

== Early life and education ==
Vanderlinden earned a Master's degree in Philosophy from the Vrije Universiteit Brussel and a Master's degree in the Arts from LUCA School of Arts.

== Professional career ==
Vanderlinden began her career in 1991 as adjunct curator for Antwerp, Cultural Capital of Europe 1993, where she contributed to the contemporary art program. Key exhibitions during this period included Sublime Void at the Museum van Hedendaagse Kunst Antwerpen; On Taking a Normal Situation and Retranslating it into Overlapping and Multiple Readings of Conditions Past and Present at the Museum van Hedendaagse Kunst Antwerpen; and New Sculptures for Middelheim at the Middelheimmuseum.

From 1996 to 2006, Vanderlinden was the founding director of Roomade a Brussels-based arts organisation dedicated to contemporary art. During her tenure, the organisation commissioned and produced numerous exhibitions, artworks, and publications, playing a significant role in shaping Brussels’ cultural landscape.

In 1998, building on her work at Roomade, Vanderlinden was appointed director of the contemporary art program at Antwerpen Open Vzw. During this period, she co-curated Laboratorium with Hans-Ulrich Obrist for the Anton Van Dyck Year, an interdisciplinary exhibition that brought together artists, scientists, and writers to explore the intersections between art, science, and knowledge production. The project exemplified her interest in experimental exhibition formats and the rethinking of curatorial practices.

From 2006 to 2009, Vanderlinden served as the founding director of the Brussels Biennial, a contemporary art biennial, and acted as artistic director for its inaugural edition in 2008, further establishing her role in shaping large-scale, international exhibition platforms.

From 2005 to 2009, Vanderlinden held several academic positions internationally. She was the Founding Visiting Professor at the Gwangju Biennale International Curators Course, Associate Professor of Curatorial Studies for the CCS Bard Master of Arts Program in Curatorial Studies in Annandale-on-Hudson, New York, and Professor of Exhibition and Museum Studies (2005–2008) at the San Francisco Art Institute.

Later, she served as Founding Director of the Exhibition Laboratory and Professor of Exhibition Studies at Uniarts Helsinki, University of the Arts Helsinki, where she curated the exhibition Laboratory of Hearing in 2015.

=== Roomade (1995–2006) ===
In 1995, Vanderlinden founded Roomade, a Brussels-based organization that collaborated with artists, philosophers, and intellectuals to develop projects "embedded in specific social situations" and aimed at "new audiences." Emerging in response to Brussels’ lack of experimental spaces for contemporary art in the mid-1990s, Roomade sought to occupy this terrain vague with non-commercial, socially engaged interventions. "embedded in a specific social situation and intended for a new audience."

As founding director (1996–2006), Vanderlinden spearheaded projects such as the Office Tower Manhattan Center Project (1996–1998), staged across vacant floors of a stalled high-rise in Brussels’ North District. A 1997 Knack article described the initiative as addressing "the desperate and long-neglected need for small events," countering the city’s "insane miscalculation of scale."

In its first year, Roomade started with the Office Tower Projects series (1996–1998) on several vacant floors of the Brussels' Manhattan Center: a megalomaniac metropolitan high-rise in the North district of Brussels that got out of hand.

Notable commissions included Matt Mullican Under Hypnosis (1996), Boris Groys: The Art of Judgement Show (2000–2002), and Carsten Höller: The Boudewijn Experiment (2000–2001). Collaborators spanned Belgian and international figures such as Jan Fabre, Ilya Kabakov, Raqs Media Collective, Tobias Rehberger, Ana Torfs, and Kobe Matthys. Roomade also co-produced major exhibitions like Laboratorium (1999, with Hans-Ulrich Obrist) and Indiscipline (2000, with Jens Hoffmann).

In 2006, Roomade's directors dissolved the organization to launch the inaugural Brussels Biennial, marking the culmination of its decade-long mission.

== Board membership and leadership roles ==
From 1998 to 2004, Vanderlinden served as Vice President of the Contemporary Art Advisory Committee of the Ministry of Culture of the Flemish Community, becoming the youngest person and the first woman ever appointed to the role.

In 1997, Vanderlinden served on the artistic committee of the Krasnoyarsk Museum Biennale, an international contemporary art event held in Krasnoyarsk, Russia.

In 1997, Vanderlinden served a member of the Konklave (Conclave), a curatorial initiative organized by the Stiftung für Kunst und Kultur (Foundation for Art and Culture) in Bonn, Germany. The group, comprising 33 international curators and art professionals, advised on the development of the exhibition Zeitwenden, which opened in December 1999.

From 1998 to 2004, Vanderlinden served as a board member of the Manifesta Foundation, the organizer of Manifesta, the European Nomadic Biennial.

From 1999 to 2006, Vanderlinden served on the board of directors of De Appel, an Amsterdam-based contemporary arts centre founded in 1975. She was appointed to the role during the tenure of Saskia Bos, who directed the organization from 1984 to 2006.

== Curatorial work ==
In 1998, she curated the exhibition Fascinating Faces of Flanders 58/98 Two hours wide or two hours long at the Centro Cultural de Bélem during that year's Expo '98 (1998 Lisbon World Exposition), a project about art and society featuring artists from the 15th century to the 20th century, and contemporary period.

In 1999, she was the co-curator of its second Manifesta 2 - European biennial of contemporary art in Luxembourg and was a member of the board of the Manifesta biennale in Amsterdam (2000–2004).

In 1999, she co-curated the exhibition Generation Z at MoMA PS1, an exhibition project exploring the attitudes of emerging artists at the end of the century from around the world. In 2000, she curated an interdisciplinary exhibition and performance program for the Brussels 2000, European Capital of Culture, titled Indiscipline, including the projects Boris Groys: The Art Judgement Show and Carsten Höller: The Boudewijn Experiment (2000–2001).

In 2001, Vanderlinden was appointed co-curator of the 24th Bienal de Sao Pauloalongside Ivo Mesquita, Adriano Pedrosa, Cuauhtémoc Medina, Louise Neri, and Lilian Tone. The edition, titled Núcleo histórico: representações utópicas (Historical Nucleus: Utopian Representations), aimed to critically reassess 20th-century avant-garde movements. However, due to financial and organizational challenges, the biennial was ultimately canceled.

In 2004, she was a co-curator of the Taipei Biennial 2004: Do You Believe In Reality?.

In 2018, she was curator of A 37 90 89: Beyond the Museum (2018–2019) at the Museum for Contemporary Art in Antwerp.

In 2019, she curated the first retrospective exhibition in Italy of Italian artist Mariella Simoni at MAMBo – Museo d’arte Moderna di Bologna (Mariella Simoni. 1975¬2018 ).

== Editorial work ==
Vanderlinden was the editor and co-author of the major source book The Manifesta Decade: Debates on Contemporary Art Exhibitions and Biennials in Post-Wall Europe (MIT Press, 2005) and co-author (with Francesco Bonami and Nancy Spector) of Maurizio Cattelan (Phaidon Press, 2003).

== Educational work ==
From 2005 to 2009, she was Founding Visiting Professor at the Gwangju Biennale International Curators Course, Associate Professor of curatorial studies for the CCS Bard Master of Arts Program in Curatorial Studies in Annandale-on-Hudson, New York, and Professor of Exhibition and Museum Studies (2005–08) at the San Francisco Art Institute.

She served as Founding Director of the Exhibition Laboratory and Professor of exhibition studies at Uniarts Helsinki, University of the Arts Helsinki where she curated the exhibition Laboratory of Hearing (2015).
