= Luchita Hurtado =

Venezuelan-American artist (1920–2020)

- Luchita Hurtado in 1973
- Born: Luisa Amelia Garcia Rodriguez Hurtado; November 28, 1920; Maiquetía, Vargas, Venezuela
- Died: August 13, 2020 (aged 99); Santa Monica, California, U.S.
- Other names: Luchita de Solar, Luchita Paalen
- Occupation: Artist
- Years active: 1940s–2020
- Spouses: Daniel de Solar, Wolfgang Paalen, Lee Mullican
- Children: 4, including Matt Mullican

Luchita Hurtado (Spanish pronunciation: [luˈtʃita wɾˈtaðo]; born Luisa Amelia García Rodriguez Hurtado; November 28, 1920 – August 13, 2020) was a Venezuelan-born American painter based in Santa Monica, California, and Arroyo Seco, New Mexico. Born in Venezuela, she moved to the United States as a child. Although she became involved with art after concentrating on the subject in high school and created art over eight decades, she only received broad recognition for her art towards the end of her life. Her work has strong environmental and feminist themes that bridges many genres, bearing influence from different art movements and cultures.

Hurtado was named as one of Time magazine's 100 Most Influential People of 2019.

== Early and personal life ==
Hurtado was born in Maiquetía, Venezuela, on November 28, 1920. Her mother moved from Venezuela to New York with her two sisters and worked as a seamstress. Hurtado and her older sister joined their mother and aunts in New York shortly afterwards in 1928, while their father stayed in Venezuela. She studied fine art at Washington Irving High School, took classes at the Art Students League, and volunteered at La Prensa, a Spanish-language newspaper where she met her first husband, Chilean journalist Daniel de Solar. The couple married when Luchita was 18 years old, and went on to have two children together. At the invitation of Rafael Trujillo, the then-dictator of the Dominican Republic, Hurtado and de Solar moved to Santo Domingo to start a newspaper. The couple moved back to New York, where they became close with a group of Latin American artists and journalists, such as Rufino Tamayo.

She and de Solar divorced in 1942. She subsequently married Wolfgang Paalen, an artist and collector, after being introduced to him by Isamu Noguchi. Hurtado's son from her first marriage, Pablo, died of polio at age 5.

During this time, her circle of fellow artists expanded. One such connection she made was with Ailes Gilmour, who had roomed with Hurtado and de Solar when they were still married. Gilmour was the half-sister of Isamu Noguchi, so Noguchi and Hurtado became close, often visiting galleries together.

In 1951, Hurtado moved to Los Angeles with fellow artist Lee Mullican who she would then marry that same decade, and remained married until his death in 1998. Together, they had two sons: Matt Mullican, a New York-based artist, and John Mullican, who works as a film director.

Hurtado died on the night of August 13, 2020, at her home in Santa Monica, California. She died of natural causes, just 76 days short of her 100th birthday.

== Art career ==
In 1944, Hurtado made window displays and painted murals for Bloomingdale's. She also began freelance work as an illustrator for Condé Nast and as a muralist for Lord & Taylor in New York. In 1946, she and her second husband Wolfgang Paalen travelled together to Mexico to research pre-Columbian art, and Hurtado took photographs that were later published in 1952 in Cahiers d'art to accompany Paalen's article, « Le plus ancien visage du nouveau monde ».

In the 1970s, Luchita Hurtado founded the feminist group, Los Angeles Council of Women Artists. In 1972, Hurtado participated in a feminist-focused group exhibition, “Invisible/Visible,” at the Long Beach Museum of Art, which was organized by Judy Chicago and Dextra Frankel. Of her work in this exhibition, Frankel described Self Portrait (1971) as "[looking] down and sees herself in a way men never see women". In 1974, she had a solo exhibition at the Woman's Building in Los Angeles. Though Hurtado participated and shared feminist beliefs with many groups, when asked to join a West Coast chapter of the Guerilla Girls, she declined.

Outside of her work for Bloomingdale's, Conde Nast, and the two Los Angeles exhibitions she participated in, Hurtado's work was largely unknown until 2015. Ryan Good, former studio director for Lee Mullican, Hurtado's third husband, was cataloguing his estate when he came across a number of paintings signed "LH". Upon asking Hurtado, he learned that she was the artist behind these works. Good showed these paintings to Paul Soto, founder of Park View Gallery, who then launched her second ever solo exhibition, Luchita Hurtado: Selected Works, 1942–1952, which ran from November 12, 2016 – January 7, 2017. From there, her career erupted. Hurtado's work was included in the Hammer Museum's Made in L.A. exhibition in 2018. She was called the "hot new discovery" of the exhibition by the L.A. Times, and generally received extremely favorable critical reception. Eventually her work caught the attention of Hans Ulrich Obrich, a Swiss art curator and artistic director of the Serpentine Galleries in which she had her first international solo exhibition, titled Luchita Hurtado: I Live I Die I Will Be Reborn. She remained active in the arts until her death, with the Los Angeles County Museum of Art exhibiting a key career survey of hers in February 2020.

Hurtado's work was included in the 2022 exhibition Women Painting Women at the Modern Art Museum of Fort Worth.

== Art imagery and reception ==
Hurtado engaged with different styles and drew elements from 20th-century avantgarde and modernist art movements such as surrealism, abstraction, and magical realism. Hurtado incorporated womb imagery into her work long before feminist art would incorporate the same subject matter during the feminist art movement in the late ’70s. Among her most well-known works is the "I Am" series of the 1960s; self-portraits that Hurtado painted by looking down at her own body, often in closets as it was the only place she could work in between child-rearing and managing the home. According to the New York Times in recent years, the environmental themes in her work became more specific and urgent, as she took up the issue of climate change. Some of her later paintings and works on paper added block-lettered texts, like “Water Air Earth,” “We Are Just a Species, and “Mother Nature,” to her signature images of figures in wide, open-armed stances, who seem to be merging with the trees around them. She had said that when it comes to this planet, she hoped that it is not too late for people to make a difference; even if it is a small one, everything counts. Others, reprising her earlier works' top-down perspective, showed globes emerging like infants from the birth canal.

Of her artworks depicting nude women, Christopher Knight, a Los Angeles Times art critic said of her work, "her drawings' loosely Surrealist forms recall dense pictographs from a variety of cultures, ancient and modern. Among them are prehistoric cave paintings, Northwest and Southwest tribal art, pre-Columbian reliefs, and the abstract paintings and sculptures." Senior Curator at the Hammer Museum from 2009 to 2019 Anne Ellegood said of Hurtado's, "you can imagine how meaningful they were at that time in terms of female artists taking back the ability to represent their own bodies and shifting the so-called male gaze and controlling that gaze." Novelist and critic Yxta Maya Murray, of Artforum, described her works depicting nude women as being "less about the pleasures and trajectories of [the] body than about its suspension in otfherwise throwaway moments." Writing about her work, curator Hans Ulrich Obrist said that, "[Hurtado's] masterly oeuvre offers an extraordinary perspective that focuses attention on the edges of our bodies and the language that we use to bridge the gap between ourselves and others. By coupling intimate gestures of the body with expansive views of the sky and the earth, Luchita maps a visceral connective tissue between us all."

Despite receiving belated recognition for her work, Hurtado did not harbor feelings of resentment towards that fact. In a 2019 interview with fellow artist Andrea Bowers for the magazine Ursula, she said, "I don't feel anger, I really don't. I feel, you know: 'How stupid of them.' Maybe the people who were looking at what I was doing had no eye for the future and, therefore, no eye for the present.".

== Exhibitions ==
- Hauser & Wirth, New York, United States, Luchita Hurtado Together Forever, September 10 - October 31, 2020
- Serpentine Sackler Gallery, London, United Kingdom, I live I die I will be reborn, May 23 - October 20, 2019
- Hammer Museum, Made in L.A. 2018, Jun 3 – September 2, 2018
- Annenberg Community Beach House, Santa Monica (2017)
- Park View Gallery, Los Angeles (2016)
- Night Club Gallery, Chicago, Illinois (2016)
- Carnegie Art Museum, Oxnard, California (1994)
- Grandview Gallery, The Woman's Building, Los Angeles (1974)
- Long Beach Museum of Art, Invisible/Visible: 21 Artists (1972)
- Tally Richards Gallery, Taos, New Mexico (1970)
- Paul Kantor Gallery, Los Angeles (1953)

== Collections ==
Hurtado's work is in the collections of the Los Angeles County Museum of Art the Pérez Art Museum Miami, and the Museum of Modern Art.

== Recognition ==
She was recognized as one of the BBC's 100 women of 2019.
