= Henrik Jakobsen =

Henrik Jakobsen may refer to:

- Henrik Jakobsen (handballer) (born 1992), Norwegian handball player
- Henrik Jakobsen (curler), Danish curler
- Henrik Plenge Jakobsen (born 1967), Danish conceptual artist
