= Issa Samb =

Senegalese painter, sculptor and actor (1945 – 2017)

- Born: 31 December 1945; Dakar, Senegal
- Died: 25 April 2017 (aged 71); Dakar, Senegal
- Other name: Joe Ouakam
- Education: University of Dakar
- Occupations: Visual artist, playwright, poet
- Known for: Painting, sculpture, performance art

Issa Samb, also known as Joe Ouakam (31 December 1945 – 25 April 2017) was a Senegalese painter, sculptor, performance artist, playwright and poet.

== Early life ==
Issa Samb was born on 31 December 1945 in Dakar, Senegal. He graduated from the University of Dakar, where he studied philosophy and law.

== Career ==
Samb took up the pseudonym Joe Ouakam. He did inter-disciplinary work that encompasses sculpture, performance, painting and theatre. His work was considered to draw from both African tradition and the European avant-garde movements such as Dada, Surrealism, Situationism and Fluxus.

Samb was well known for his presence. His involvement in the community made him one of the most well known artists in Dakar. Samb's downtown courtyard studio, often found cluttered with various materials and projects, served as an exhibition of his own. Needless to say that Samb played a crucial role in Dakar's art scene.

Samb was one of the founding members of the seminal Laboratoire Agit'Art in 1973. His work was exhibited at Whitechapel Gallery, London in its ‘Seven Stories of Modern Art in Africa’ exhibition in 1995 and the 2008 the Biennale de l’Art Africain Contemporain, Dak'Art in Dakar. In 2010, a retrospective of his work was held at the National Art Gallery, Dakar. His work was also exhibited at the 2012 documenta in Kassel, Germany. By 2014, InIVA, an art gallery in London, curated 'Issa Samb: From the Ethics of Acting to the Empire without Signs'. The Tunisian director Taïeb Louhichi dedicated a documentary to him in 1994 "Ker Joe Ouakam".

In 2019, the curator Koyo Kouoh selected Samb's La Cour (The Yard) (2013), an evolving live/works space and courtyard installation, as her pick for the most influential work of the decade.

== Death ==
Samb died on 25 April 2017, at 71.
