= Lee Mullican =

American painter, curator, and art teacher

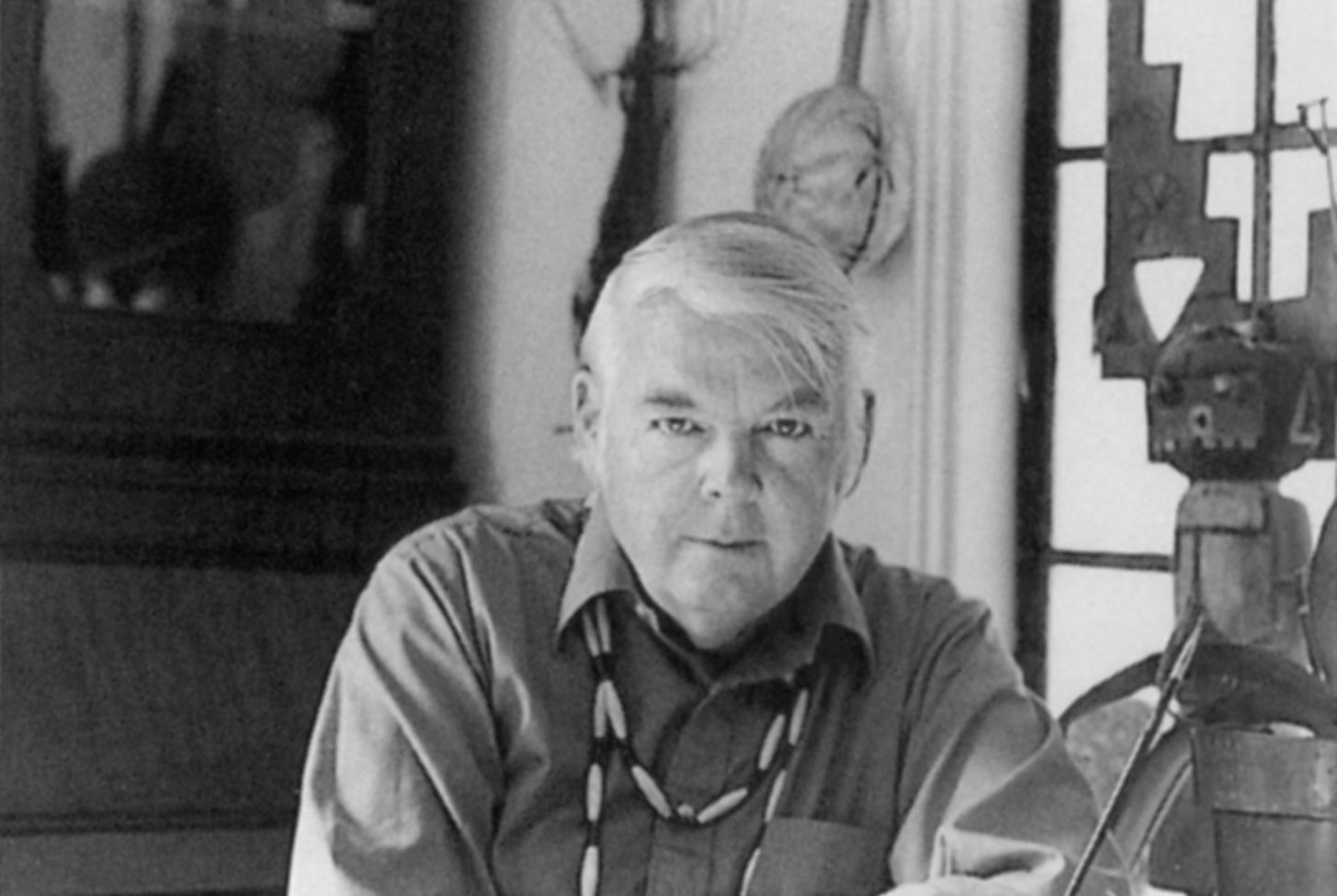
- Lee Mullican (1970) in his Santa Monica residence
- Born: December 2, 1919; Chickasha, Oklahoma, U.S.
- Died: July 7, 1998; Santa Monica, California, U.S.
- Education: Abilene Christian University, Kansas City Art Institute, University of Oklahoma
- Known for: Painting, drawings
- Movement: Dynaton, Surrealism
- Spouse: Luchita Hurtado
- Children: 2, including Matt Mullican

Lee Mullican (December 2, 1919 – July 8, 1998) was an American painter, curator, and art teacher. He was an influential member of the Dynaton Movement, that took its name from a 1951 exhibition at the San Francisco Museum of Modern Art, organized by Grace McCann Morley.

== Early life and education ==
Lee Mullican was born on December 2, 1919, in Chickasha, Oklahoma. He studied at the Abilene Christian University in Texas, the University of Oklahoma, and the Kansas City Art Institute.

During World War II, he was in the United States Army and served in Hawaii.

== Career and late life ==
He moved to San Francisco after the war in 1947. Mullican was part of a 1951 exhibition called "Dynaton" held at the San Francisco Museum of Art. Mullican was a member of the UCLA School of the Arts and Architecture faculty from 1962 to 1990.

His paintings were abstract and have a "rigid" and "linear" quality to them. He applied paint with a printer's knife. Mullicans work was influenced by cosmology, which is also a trait found in other Dynaton artists work.

Mullican married artist Luchita Hurtado and they had two sons. Their son Matt Mullican is an artist; and their son John Mullican is a writer and director. He died on July 8, 1998, in Santa Monica, California. In 2008, his son John Mullican released the documentary film, Finding Lee Mullican.
