= Koo Jeong A =

South Korean visual artist (fl. 21st century)

- Born: 13 March 1967 (age 59); Seoul, South Korea.
- Education: Ecole des Beaux-Arts
- Known for: Visual arts; installation art; Contemporary Art
- Spouse: Hans Ulrich Obrist
- Website: https://www.koojeonga.com

- Koo Jeong A
- Hangul: 구정아
- RR: Gu Jeonga
- MR: Ku Chŏnga

Koo Jeong A is a South-Korean born mixed-media and installation artist.

== Early life and education ==
Koo was born on 13 March 1967.

Koo studied at the Ecole des Beaux-Arts in Paris.

== Work ==
Koo's work has included still and moving images, sound and scent, found objects, the natural environment, and site-specific installation. The New York Times referred to their work as having diverse influences and themes of childhood longing. Art in America called their work "focused", "quiet", and "quirky."

Koo was an artist-in-residence in the Augarten Contemporary, part of the Österreichische Galerie Belvedere in Vienna, in 2002.

== Recognition ==
In 2016, they were named "2016 Artist of the Year" by the Korean Cultural Centre UK.

In 2005 they were awarded the Hermès Korea Missulsang prize.

In 2002, Koo was a finalist for the Hugo Boss Prize at the Solomon R. Guggenheim Museum.

== Personal life ==
Koo is in a relationship with curator, Hans Ulrich Obrist.

== Select exhibitions ==
- Odorama Cities, 60th Venice Biennale, Giardini in Venice, Italy (2024)
- Visibilities: Intrepid Women of Artpace, Artpace, San Antonio, Texas (2020)
- Galerie Eva Presenhuber, New York (2020)
- OooOoO, La Triennale di Milano, Milano (2019)
- Don't look like a line, Pinksummer temporary venue, Hangar Toolbox, Via Egeo, Turin (2017)
- ajeongkoo, Art Sonje Center, Seoul (2017)
- Arrogation, 32nd São Paulo Biennial, São Paulo (2016)
- 'Odorama', Art Night with Institute of Contemporary Arts, London (2016)
- 14th Venice Biennale of Architecture, Swiss Pavilion (2014)
- 10th Gwangju Biennale (2014)
- The Oussser (2014), La Raia Fondazione
- do it 2013, Manchester Art Gallery (2013)
- Koo Jeong-A (2012), Kunsthalle Düsseldorf
- 20 (2012), Pinksummer
- Constellation Congress, Dia:Beacon (2010)
- 53rd Venice Biennale (2009)
- Your Bright Future: 12 Contemporary Artists from Korea (2009), Los Angeles County Museum of Art
- Koo Jeong A, Aspen Art Museum (2007)
- Singular Forms (Sometimes Repeated), Solomon R. Guggenheim Museum (2004)

== Public collections ==
Koo's work may be found in several public institutions, including:

- Solomon R. Guggenheim Museum
- Centre Pompidou
- Tate Modern
- Astrup Fearnley Museum of Modern Art
- RISD Museum
- Louis Vuitton Foundation for Creation
- Musée d'Art Moderne de la Ville de Paris
- Frac fond régional d'art contemporain, Marseille, France
- FNAC (Fonds national d'art contemporain), Paris

== Publications ==
- Constellation Congress: Koo Jeong A. New Haven: Yale University Press (2012). ISBN 978-0-300-18880-6
- Otro: Koo Jeong A. Vassiviere: Le Centre International d'Art et du Paysage (2012). ISBN 978-2-910850-55-5
- 9 Nove/Nine: Koo Jeong A. Lisbon: Fundacao Calouste Gulbenkian (2011). ISBN 978-972-635-237-2
- Oussseux Milan: Silvana Editions (2010). ISBN 8836616909
- Flammariousss: Koo Jeong A & Edouard Glissant Paris: Yvon Lambert (2006).
- Koo Jeong-A : 315 n° 1 Paris: Editions du Centre Pompidou (2004). ISBN 2-84426-239-2
- Frozen With A Smile: Koo Jeong A. Kitayushu: Silvana Editions (2010). ISBN 4-901387-20-0
- The Land of Ousss Dublin: Douglas Hyde Gallery (2002). Ireland ISBN 0907660797
- Koo Jeong A. Paris: Editions des musees de la Ville de Paris (1997). ISBN 2-87900-351-2
- Migrateurs: Koo Jeong A. Paris: ARC Musee d'Art Moderne de la Ville de Paris (1994). ISBN 2-904497-14-5

== See also ==
- Installation art
