= Joseph Grigely =

American visual artist and scholar (born 1956)

- Born: December 16, 1956 (age 69); East Longmeadow, MA
- Education: Saint Anselm College (BA, 1978); University of Oxford (D.Phil, 1984)
- Known for: Conceptual art, archiving practices, textual criticism

Joseph Grigely (born December 16, 1956) is an American visual artist and scholar. His work is primarily conceptual and engages a variety of media forms including sculpture, video, and installations. Grigely was included in two Whitney Biennials (2000, 2014), and is also a Guggenheim Fellow. He lives and works in Chicago, where he is Professor of Visual and Critical Studies at the School of the Art Institute of Chicago.

== Early life and education ==
Grigely grew up in East Longmeadow, Massachusetts. He was deafened at the age of 10 when he fell down a hill while playing "King on the Mountain" with friends. He studied English literature at Saint Anselm College in Goffstown, New Hampshire, where he received a BA magna cum laude in 1978. After a failed attempt at a career as a professional ice hockey player, he continued his studies in literature at Oxford University in England, and received a D.Phil. in 1984.

== Career ==
Grigely's first teaching position, in 1983, was at Gallaudet College, a liberal arts institution devoted to teaching deaf and hard of hearing students. In 1985 he was awarded an Andrew Mellon Postdoctoral Fellowship at Stanford, where he taught in the English department. In 1994 he was appointed as a visiting associate professor of art history at the University of Michigan, Ann Arbor, and in 1995 was granted tenure in UM's School of Art. In 2002 he was appointed Professor of Visual and Critical Studies at the School of the Art Institute of Chicago, a position he still holds. At SAIC he teaches studio and seminar courses in Exhibition Prosthetics; Dissemination; the Hans Ulrich Obrist Archive; and Theorizing Disability.

As an artist, Grigely has participated in over fifty solo shows and 250 group shows since 1994. His exhibitions include the Whitney (2000, 2014), Berlin (2001), and Istanbul (1997) biennials, and solo shows at the Douglas Hyde Gallery, Dublin (2009, 1998); the Whitney Museum of American Art (2001) the Orange County Museum of Art (2007), The Tang Museum, Saratoga (2008), the Museum of Contemporary Art, Chicago (2008) and Kunstverein Hamburg (2016). He has also exhibited at the Centre Georges Pompidou (Paris, 2001, Metz, 2011), Kunstmuseum, Bern (2002), the Guggenheim Museum, New York (2004), the Van Abbemuseum, Eindhoven (2005), and the Musée d'Art Moderne de la Ville de Paris (2000). A survey of Grigely's work was published as Joseph Grigely: St. Cecilia, ed. Ian Berry and Irene Hofmann. Baltimore & Saratoga Springs: The Baltimore Contemporary Museum and the Tang Museum, 2007. In 2004 he was an Artadia Awardee.

== Work ==
=== Scholarship ===
As a scholar, Grigely's work covers a range of topics that include textual criticism; exhibition studies; and body criticism. As a textual critic, his most important work is Textualterity: Art, Theory, and Textual Criticism, which was published in 1995 by the University of Michigan Press. Textualterity examines artworks as dynamic objects and the ways they are made, unmade, and remade as they are disseminated in culture. The book challenges the long-held assumption of the 'ideal' text or ideal state, and replaces it with a consideration that what is ideal in textual studies is what is real.

In exhibition studies, Grigely has published a number of texts in recent years. Among them is the book Exhibition Prosthetics (Bedford Press and Sternberg Press, 2010). "Exhibition Prosthetics" is a descriptive term given to an array of printed media that function to expand the reach of both art and art exhibitions: press releases, catalogues, announcements, and wall labels. A related book by Grigely, based on a series of incremental exhibitions he organized in an atrium setting, is MacLean 705 (Bedford Press, 2015).

In the field of body criticism Grigely's work emphasizes ways the disabled body is an enabled body. His "Postcards to Sophie Calle," originally published in the Swiss periodical Parkett and reprinted several times, is considered a seminal text in disability studies. More recent publications that have dealt with the optical turn in deafness include an essay on the deaf artist James Castle, another on Beethoven, and a critical essay on "Soundscaping" that appeared in Artforum in November 2016.

=== Art ===
As an artist, Grigely has built up a body of work based on two subjects: "Conversations With the Hearing," and archives and archiving practices. The conversations with the hearing consist of notepapers hearing people have written on in the course of conversing with Grigely. These papers are saved and archived and are used as the raw material for creating narrative art: the papers are pinned to the wall in deliberately placed juxtapositions as a way of drawing from the papers both a verbal narrative and a visually abstract one in the form of a grid. Grigely is sometimes considered a proponent of Relational Aesthetics; he was included in Nicolas Bourriaud's show "Contacts" at Kunsthalle Fribourg in 2000 and "Touch: Relational Aesthetics in the 1990s" at the San Francisco Art Institute in 2002.

Grigely's work also explores how archives might be engaged creatively and critically. He has focused on four bodies of archives in recent years:

1. His archive of ordinary conversations, which presently has approximately 85,000 conversation papers.
2. The archive of the late critic Gregory Battcock, which was the basis of Grigely's installation at the 2014 Whitney Biennial, and a book on Battcock's work entitled Oceans of Love: The Uncontainable Gregory Battcock (London, Koenig, 2016).
3. An archive of publications and publication projects of the curator Hans Ulrich Obrist. This project has been in progress for more than two decades, and is described in detail in Grigely's essay "The Obrist Factor" (Berlin, Sternberg Press, 2019). A description of the project, and an ongoing blog by Grigely's students can be found at www.huobrist.org.
4. Archive of trout flies tied by the originators of specific patterns, and fly tying materials used to tie them. This archive focuses primarily on American tiers from the 1920s–1990s, including Art Flick; Edward Hewitt; Walt, Winnie, and Mary Dette; Carrie Stevens; Ed Haas; Ken Abrames; Keith Fulsher; Polly Rosborough; Helen Shaw; Dan Gapen; and Fran Betters.

== Selected recent exhibitions ==
- 2019: "That Which is Not Drawn," Marian Goodman Gallery, London
- 2019: "It's Urgent!" Curated by Hans Ulrich Obrist, Luma Westbau, Zurich
- 2019: "The Extended Mind," Talbot Rice Gallery, Edinburgh
- 2018: "Small Talk," Nogueras Blanchard, Madrid
- 2018: Liverpool Biennial
- 2018: "Second Sight: The Paradox of Vision in Contemporary Art," Bowdoin College Museum of Art
- 2018: "Take Me (I'm Yours)," Villa Medici, Rome
- 2017: "Reiteracíon," García Galería, Madrid
- 2017: "Twenty Years," Air de Paris, Paris
- 2017: "Blueberry Surprise," Park Nights, Serpentine, London
- 2016: "Even if You Can't Hear," Galerie Francesca Pia, Zurich)
- 2016: "D'une Méditerranée, l'autre," Frac Marseille (2016)
- 2015–16: "The Gregory Battcock Archive," Grazer Kunstverein, Graz (2015) and Hamburg Kunstverein, Hamburg (2016) and Marian Goodman Gallery, London (2016)
- 2015: "The Translator's Voice," FRAC Lorraine, traveled to MARCO, Museo de Arte Contemporánea, Vigo, Spain, and SFKM, Sogn og Fjordane Kunstmuseum, Førde, Norway
- 2014: "Whitney Biennial," Whitney Museum of American Art, New York
- 2013: "Le Principe Galápagos," Palais de Tokyo, Paris
- 2013: "Please Come to the Show: Invitations and Event Flyers from the MoMA Library," Museum of Modern Art, New York
- 2012: "Remains," Air de Paris, Paris
- 2011: "Erre," Centre Pompidou, Metz
- 2001: "Information", Joan Miró Foundation, Barcelona, curated by Ferran Barenblit

Grigely's work is in a number of institutional and private collections. Among them are:

- Whitney Museum of American Art
- The Museum of Modern Art, New York
- The Tate Modern, London
- The Stedelijk Museum, Amsterdam
- The Museum of Contemporary Art, Chicago
- Fonds National d'Art Contemporain, France
- Louisiana Museum of Modern Art, Humlebaek
- Galería NoguerasBlanchard

== Awards ==
- 2019: Foundation for Contemporary Arts
- 2009: Warhol Foundation/Creative Capital Grant
- 2008: Creative Capital Foundation Grant
- 2008: Wynn Newhouse Award
- 2008: The Andy Warhol Foundation Arts Writers Grant
- 2005: Guggenheim Fellowship

== Writings ==
- "Stonework," in Ursula. Issue no 4. New York: Hauser & Wirth, 2019.
- Interview with Hans Ulrich Obrist, in Creative Chicago: An Interview Marathon, ed. Alison Cuddy (Chicago: Terra Foundation), 2019. ISBN 9780932171672
- "The Obrist Factor," in An Exhibition Always Hides Another Exhibition: Texts on Hans Ulrich Obrist, ed. April Lamm. Berlin: Sternberg, 2019. ISBN 978-3956792885
- "Conversations with Ellen," in Ellen Cantor, ed. Fatima Hellberg and Jamie Stevens (Kunstlerhaus Stuttgart, Wattis Institute, Sternberg Press), 2018. ISBN 978-3-95679-323-3
- A Visitor's Guide to the Hans Ulrich Obrist Archive. Chicago: The Hans Ulrich Obrist Archive, 2018.
- Blueberry Surprise: A Play For Three Voices. London: The Serpentine, 2017.
- Oceans of Love: The Uncontainable Gregory Battcock, ed. and int. Joseph Grigely. London: Verlag Walther Koenig, 2016. ISBN 9783863359331
- "Joseph Grigely: Soundscaping," Artforum (November 2016).
- "Joseph Grigely on Sanford Friedman's Conversations with Beethoven." Artforum (May 2015).
- MacLean 705, ed. and int. Joseph Grigely. London: The Architectural Association/Bedford Press, 2015. ISBN 1907414487
- Joseph Grigely, Exhibition Prosthetics. London & Berlin: The Bedford Press & The Sternberg Press, 2010. Second edition: London, The Bedford Press, 2011. ISBN 1907414134
- It Has Only Just Begun: Hans Ulrich Obrist in Conversation with Joseph Grigely and Rirkrit Tiravanija. Int. AA Bronson. New York: Printed Matter, 2010.
- Joseph Grigely, "Right at Home: James Castle and the Slow Life Drawing," catalogue essay on the work of James Castle, James Castle, ed. John Hutchinson. Dublin: The Douglas Hyde Gallery, 2010. ISBN 1905397259
- Joseph Grigely, [Imbrie] Dublin: Douglas Hyde Gallery, 2009. ISBN 9781905397242
- Joseph Grigely, "White," Cabinet, (Fall 2007).
- Joseph Grigely: St. Cecilia, ed. Ian Berry and Irene Hofmann. Baltimore & Saratoga Springs: The Baltimore Contemporary Museum and the Tang Museum, 2007. ISBN 0976572346
- Joseph Grigely, Blueberry Surprise. Brussels: Editions Michele Didier, 2006. ISBN 2930439025
- Joseph Grigely, "Postcards to Sophie Calle," Michigan Quarterly Review 37.2 (Spring 1998): 206–233. Reprinted in The Body Aesthetic: From the Body in Fine Arts to Body Modification, ed. Tobin Siebers. Ann Arbor: University of Michigan Press, 2000.
- Joseph Grigely, Conversation Pieces. Kitakyushu: Center for Contemporary Art and Korinsha Press, 1998. ASIN B00JAIP59Y
- Joseph Grigely, Recovering Lost Fictions: Caravaggio's "Musicians." Cambridge, Ma.: MIT List Visual Arts Center, 1997. ASIN B0006R2R8A
- Joseph Grigely, The Pleasure of Conversing. London: Anthony d'Offay Gallery, 1996. French edition, Le Plaisir de la Conversation, translated by Yves Abrioux. Limoges: FRAC-Limousin, 1996.
- Joseph Grigely, Textualterity: Art, Theory, and Textual Criticism. Ann Arbor: U of Michigan Press, 1995. ISBN 0472105795
- Joseph Grigely, Deaf & Dumb: A Tale. New York: White Columns, 1994. ASIN B009LO2TTG

== See also ==
- List of Whitney Biennial Artists
