= Sarat Maharaj =

South African writer (born 1951)

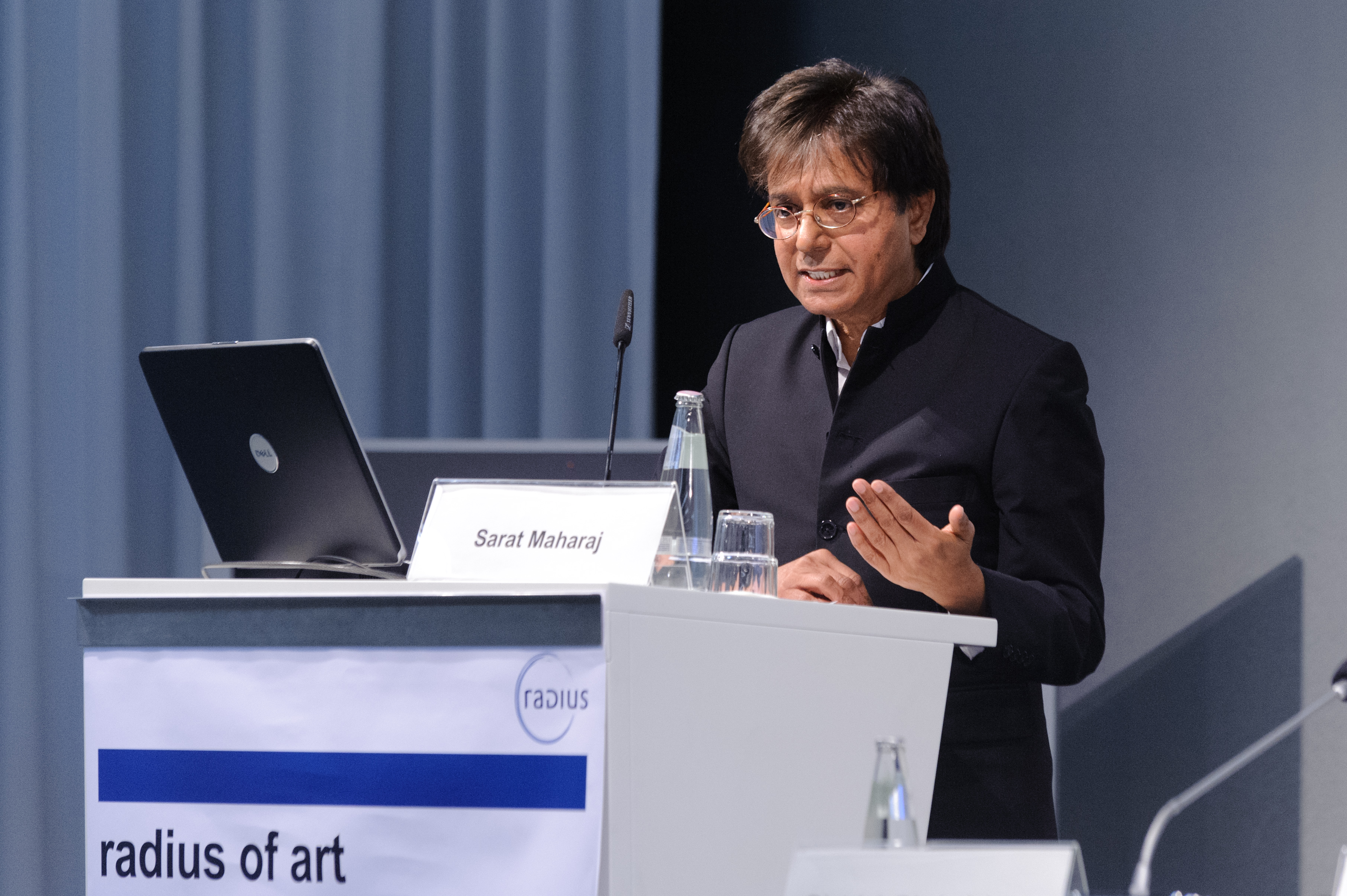
Sarat Maharaj, 2012

Sarat Maharaj (born 1951 in Durban, South Africa) is a writer, researcher, curator, and professor.

Maharaj's family was part of the large group of Indians who migrated to the province of KwaZulu-Natal in the nineteenth century. The grandfather of Maharaj worked in sugar plantations as a contract worker.

As a child, Maharaj witnessed the effects of racial segregation under the Apartheid regime. During his university studies, Maharaj had to travel by ferry to the University College for Indians, located on Salisbury Island off the coast of Durban. These experiences made him sensitive to the violence that was inherently present in classification systems.

Maharaj eventually left South Africa for Britain. In 1980, he began his doctorate at Goldsmiths. His thesis was The Dialectic of Modernism and Mass Culture: Studies in Post War British Art. He is an authority on the work of Richard Hamilton, Marcel Duchamp, and James Joyce. He is a Professor of Visual Arts and Knowledge Systems at the Malmö Art Academy at Lund University in Sweden and was Professor of Art and Art Theory at Goldsmiths College, London from 1980 to 2005.

Maharaj has held visiting professorships and fellowships at several institutions including Jan Van Eyck Academie, Maastricht and Humboldt University, Berlin. His writings, curatorial projects, and presentations have appeared all over the world. Maharaj is also a member of the advisory board of the journal Third Text.

Curatorial projects include:

- co-curator, There is always a cup of tea to sail in: 29th São Paulo Biennale (2010)
- Farewell to Postcolonialism, Towards a Post-Western Modernity, Guangzhou Triennial, Guwangzhou, (2008)
- Knowledge Lab, Haus der Kulturen der Welt, Berlin, (2005)
- co-curator, documenta 11, Kassel, (2002)
- co-curator (with Richard Hamilton and Ecke Bonk), retinal.optical. visual.conceptual . . ., Museum Boijmans Van Beuningen, Rotterdam, 2002

Maharaj lives and works in London and Lund.

== Bibliography ==
=== Selected books ===
- Annotations: Modernity and Difference No. 6 (Art Catalogue) by Stuart Hall and Sarat Maharaj (15 Jun 2001) ISBN 1899846301 ISBN 978-1899846306
- Printed Project 11: Farewell to Post-Colonialism (1 Jun 2009) ISBN 190768302X ISBN 978-1907683022
- Port City: On Mobility and Exchange by Ursula Biemann, Paul Domela, Paul Gilroy and Sarat Maharaj (1 Oct 2007) ISBN 0907738877 ISBN 978-0907738879
- Roy Lichtenstein by Robert Rosenblum and Sarat Maharaj (Feb 1993) ISBN 1854371126 ISBN 978-1854371126
- Richard Hamilton: XLV Biennale di Venezia, British Pavilion, 13 June-10 October 1993 by Richard Hamilton and Sarat Maharaj (Jun 1993) ISBN 086355217X ISBN 978-0863552175

=== Selected articles ===
- Maharaj, Sarat (1991). "The Congo is flooding the acropolis: Art in Britain of the immigrations". Third Text. 5 (15): 77–90. doi:10.1080/09528829108576318. Subject: Art and immigration in Britain.
- Ahamkara. Sarat Maharaj in conversation with Francisco Varela. in: Intellectual Birdhouse, edited by Dombois, Bauer, Mareis, Schwab. London: Koenig Books, pp. 65–86. ISBN 9783863351182
