= Jean-Luc Moulène =

French artist (born 1955)

Jean-Luc Moulène (born 1955) is a French contemporary artist based in Paris, France. Spanning a wide variety of media, such as photography, drawings, and sculptures, Moulène's practice examines the relationship between systems and orders. Moulène has stated that he subscribes to the notion of a 'disjunction,' whereby he follows a principle of discrepancies as a way to "find new dialectical knowledge." His interests include the "symbolic position of the author" and authorship; processes of production, repetition, and accumulation; labor and social space; and the intersection of advanced technology and contemporary material culture, among others. Moulène identifies himself as a "technicien libertaire" (life itself as a technique), who transforms "the process of perception as an aesthetic end in itself to one that incorporates everyday life" in his work.

== Early life and career ==
Moulène began studying art in 1972 at the Académie des Beaux-Arts in Versaille, where he became friends with the artist Michel Journiac. Journiac introduced Moulène to artists in the Art Corporel movement, such as Gina Pane and Hermann Nitsch. He received his both his BA (1978) and MA (1979) at the Université Paris 1 Panthéon-Sorbonne. In 1983, Moulène began Disjonctions/ (1983–99), an early series of sixty photographs that document uneventful street scenes. Yasmil Raymond has noted that the Disjonctions "confers a lack of identity and congruity," resisting the commonality expected of a series. In 1990, Moulène participated in the exhibition De Afstand at the Witte de With Center for Contemporary Art, Rotterdam, alongside Andreas Gursky, Craigie Horsfield, Christopher Williams. This exhibition spurred Moulène's practice to diverge "in terms of his method of production" and shaped his subsequent series.

== Work ==
Moulène's work has been described as a self-reflective process of interrogation that generates variations; distresses order; and produces "certainty through negation." Moulène organizes his works into categories and subcategories, establishing an ontological distinction for himself and indicating his processes of production and the rhetoric of the images. Several philosophers, such as Reza Negarestani and Alain Badiou, have written on Moulène, particularly in relation to abstraction. Negarestani had written that "if abstraction in contemporary art is a part of that self-reflexive history that contributes to the isolation of art from other fields of thought and," "then Moulène's work should be understood as a genuine struggle against this self-inflected sequestration." Disagreeing with Negarestani, Badiou had written that there is a "difference between abstraction as practiced in the sciences and abstraction as it enters into the creation of a work of art," and Moulène's works return "to the self-evidence of an object."

=== Major works and series ===
==== Documents/ (1989– ) ====
Documents/ is a body of work began in 1989 with a distinct first-person narrative. It contains Moulène's repeated visits to a particular site, the systematic compilation of a particular collection of objects, and the acquisition of products manufactured. Corinne Diserens has described the series as a "subversion of the habits and the reading codes" that images induce. By the late 1990s, Moulène simultaneously began work on different series and organized the images into subgroups within the broader category of Documents/. Included in this are:

- Objets de grève (39 Strike Objects) (1999–2000): this is a series of photographs documenting products made by French industrial workers on strike, and sold in the black market to help fund their cause. For instance, "Bleu Gauloises bleues" (2000) shows a Gauloises cigarette with an inscription: "Cigarettes manufactured by the workers in dispute." Furthermore, Moulène's photographs contain a disclaimer, in which he notes that they are not by Moulène but simply "made visible by him." This emphasizes the power struggles in the making of artwork and the post-production, as well as notes the artist's interest in "the social conditions in which the artist and the labourer operate in the contemporary world."
- Produits de Palestine (2004–2005): this is a series of photographs documenting products made in the occupied territories of the Gaza Strip and West Bank and branded as Palestinian. Due to the sanctions, the objects cannot circulate around the world "in the way they now circulate as photographs." Flash Art has remarked that Moulène's work "carry a strange form of tautology at the core of their very existence...While 'not producing' the objects, workers have nonetheless produced them, and so the markers of stoppage must be conveyed by other means."

==== Opus (1995– ) ====
In the mid 1990s, Moulène initiated a parallel project consisting of three-dimensional objects and termed them "Opus." In this series, Moulène explores materials—both manufactured and found, and industrial and organic. These works, including bronze, cement, tobacco, and wood, are each identified with a title as well as the city, month, and year in which they were fabricated. On Moulène's dual practice in photography and three-dimensional object, Nathalie Delbard has written that Moulène modifies "the aesthetic regime each of them belongs to in order to expose its implicit structures." The subsets within "Opus" are influenced by topology, and mathematical structures and theories, with an emphasis on protocol and transformation. Particularly important is knot theory, which Moulène considers as "tools to describe complexity."

==== Bi-Face (2016) ====
In 2016, as a part of the retrospective Jean-Luc Moulène at the Centre Pompidou, Moulène created thirty-two new works, one of which was Bi-Face (2016), a large sculpture in coated and painted hard foam. With no visible joints or cracks, and no signs of making, Bi-Face was presented on the floor. In The Burlington Magazine, Luke Naessens describes the presentation as a "minimalist literalness," which was "very much in the visitor's physical space." He further notes that the work explores the blurring of "material and the imagistic, the sexual and the mechanical, the bodily and the abstract."

More or Less Bone (Formal Topological Optimization) (2018–2019)

In 2019, Moulène had his first institutional exhibition in North America since 2011 at the SculptureCenter. In the exhibition, Moulène premiered More or Less Bone (Formal Topological Optimization), a monumental new work in fiberglass and epoxy paint. For the work, Moulène collaborated with engineers from Aerospace Valley in France with expertise in formal optimization—when the form of an object is defined a process that identifies the "most efficient, least wasteful" solution within a set of variables. Moulène proposed to produce an optimized form connecting a sphere, a spiral staircase, and a knucklebone; he and the engineers then "manipulated the form of this 'object of juncture' to account for a set volume, scale, terrestrial gravity, the material properties of fiberglass, and environment conditions." Mark Bechtel notes that More Or Less Bone is "derived from a mutable relationship that is equivalent in all its variations by topological terms," telegraphing "limitless possibilities while seemingly remaining under absolute control."

== Exhibitions ==
Moulène's works have been exhibited in the Venice Biennial (2019, 2003); the Taipei Biennial (2016 and 2004); the Sharjah Biennial (2010); the First International Biennial of the Image (Laos, 2007); the Sao Paulo Biennial (2002); and Documenta X (1997). Solo exhibitions of Moulène's works have been held at SculptureCenter, New York (2019); Miguel Abreu Gallery (2019, 2017, and 2014); Centre d'art contemporain, Delme (2018); Fondation d'enterprise Hermes, Brussels (2018); Secession, Vienna (2017); Centre Pompidou, Paris (2016–2017); Villa Medici, Rome (2015); Kunstverein Hannover (2014); Dia:Beacon, New York (2012); Carré d'art-Musée d'art contemporain, Nîmes (2009); Culturgest, Lisbon (2007); Musée du Louvre, Paris (2005); and Centre d'Art Contemporain de Genève (2003). Moulène's work has been included in group exhibitions at MoMA PS1 (New York); École Nationale Supérieure des Beaux-Arts de Paris; Centre de la photographie Genève, Miejski Osrodek Sztuki (Gorzów, Poland); S.M.A.K. (Ghent, Belgium); MMOMA (Moscow); Secession (Vienna); Museo Tamayo (Mexico City); Guggenheim Museum Bilbao; Palais de Tokyo (Paris), Punta Della Dogana – Palazzo Grassi (Venice); Witte de With (Rotterdam), ARC / Musée d'Art Moderne de la Ville de Paris; Le Magasin (Grenoble); Yokohama Museum of Art; Triennale de Milano; KW Institute for Contemporary Art (Berlin); Museum Ludwig (Cologne); De Appel (Amsterdam); Landesmuseum Joanneum GmbH Kunsthaus (Graz); Centre Pompidou (Paris); Kunstverein Nürnberg, and elsewhere.

== Monographs ==
- Jean-Luc Moulène Dessins/Drawings 1977–2016 (Dijon: Les Presses Du Reel, 2018)
- Jean-Luc Moulène: Breves, 2017 (Vienna: Secession/Revolver Press, 2017)
- Jean-Luc Moulène (Paris: Centre Pompidou/Editions Dilecta, 2016)
- Jean- Luc Moulène: Documents, 1999-2016 (New York: Sequence Press, 2016)
- 39 Strike Objects: 1999–2000 (New York: Sequence Press, 2016)
- Jean-Luc Moulène: Disjonctions / Opus & Documents / Il Était Une Fois (Vienna: Verlag Für Moderne Kunst, 2014)
- 48 Palestinian Products (Berlin: PhotoCairo3, 2007)
- Opus + One (New Haven: Yale University Press and Dia Art Foundation, 2012)
- Jean-Luc Moulène (Köln: Walther König, 2009)
- Berlin (Gottingene: Steidel, 2000)
- Déposition. Jean-Luc Moulène 1997 (Paris: Paris Musées, 1998)

Other texts on his work include Matter and Form: Self-evidence and Surprise: On Jean-Luc Moulène's Objects by Alain Badiou (Sequence Press, 2019) and Torture Concrete: Jean-Luc Moulène and the Protocol of Abstraction by Reza Negarestani (Sequence Press, 2014).

== Collections ==
Moulène's works are held in the collections of the Museum of Modern Art (New York); Tate (London); Museum of Contemporary Art (Los Angeles); Pinault Collection; Dia Art Foundation (New York); Musée de l'art moderne de la ville de Paris; Kadist Art Foundation (Paris); Musée d'Art Moderne et Contemporain (Strasbourg, France); and Centre National des Arts Plastiques (Paris).
