= Panamarenko =

Belgian sculptor (1940–2019)

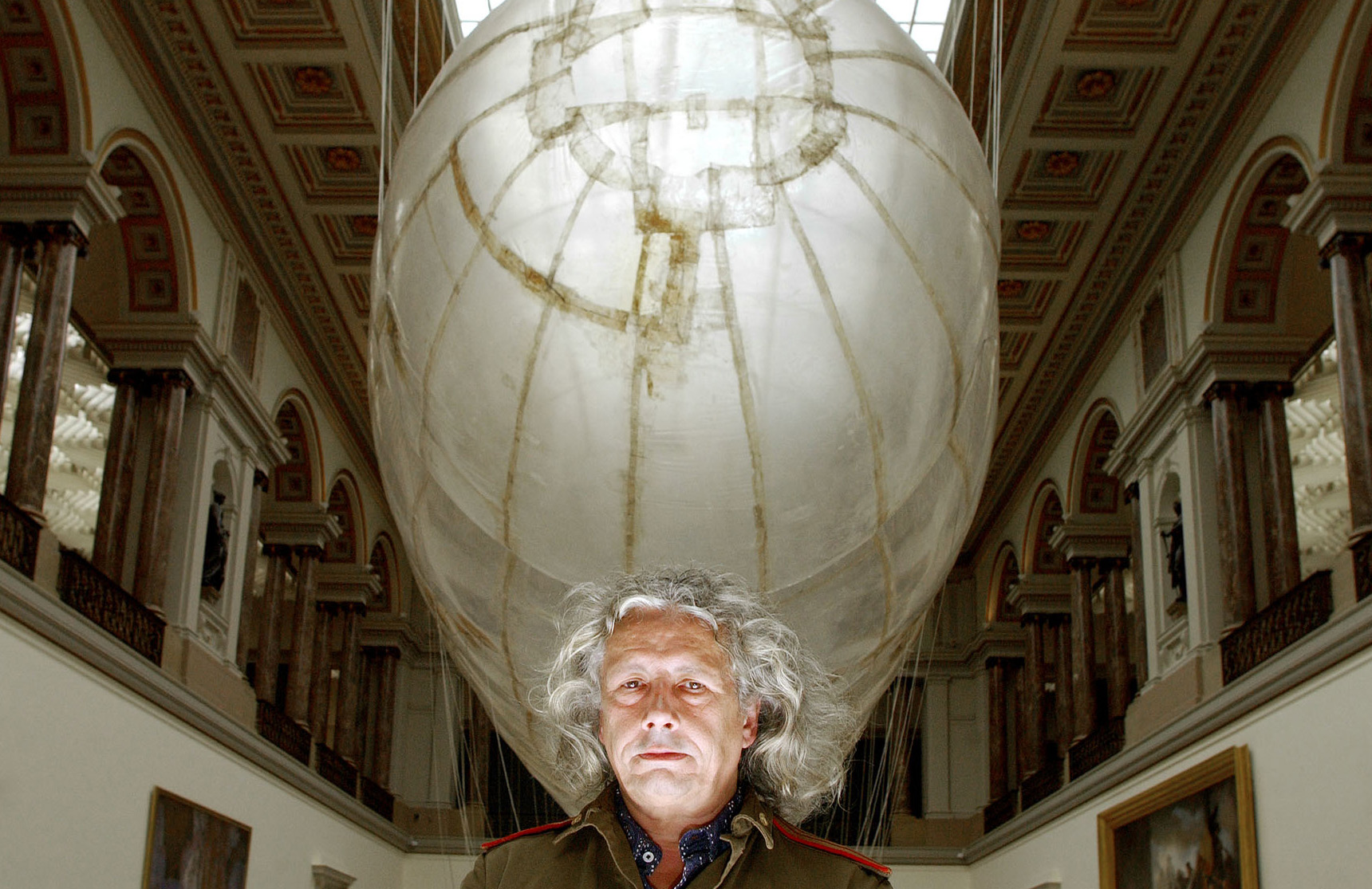
Panamerenko in front of his Aeromodeller (photographer Michiel Hendryckx)

Henri Van Herwegen (5 February 1940 – 14 December 2019), known by the pseudonym Panamarenko, was a prominent assemblagist Belgian sculptor. Famous for his work with aeroplanes as theme; none of which are able nor constructed to actually leave the ground.

== Life and work ==
Panamarenko was born in Antwerp, where he studied at the Royal Academy of Fine Arts from 1955 to 1960. Before 1968, his art was inspired by pop-art, but early on he became interested in aeroplanes and human powered flight. This interest is also reflected in his name, which supposedly is an acronym for "Pan American Airlines and Company". The name Panamarenko may also be influenced by Panteleimon Ponomarenko, a politician-ambassador from the former Soviet Union.

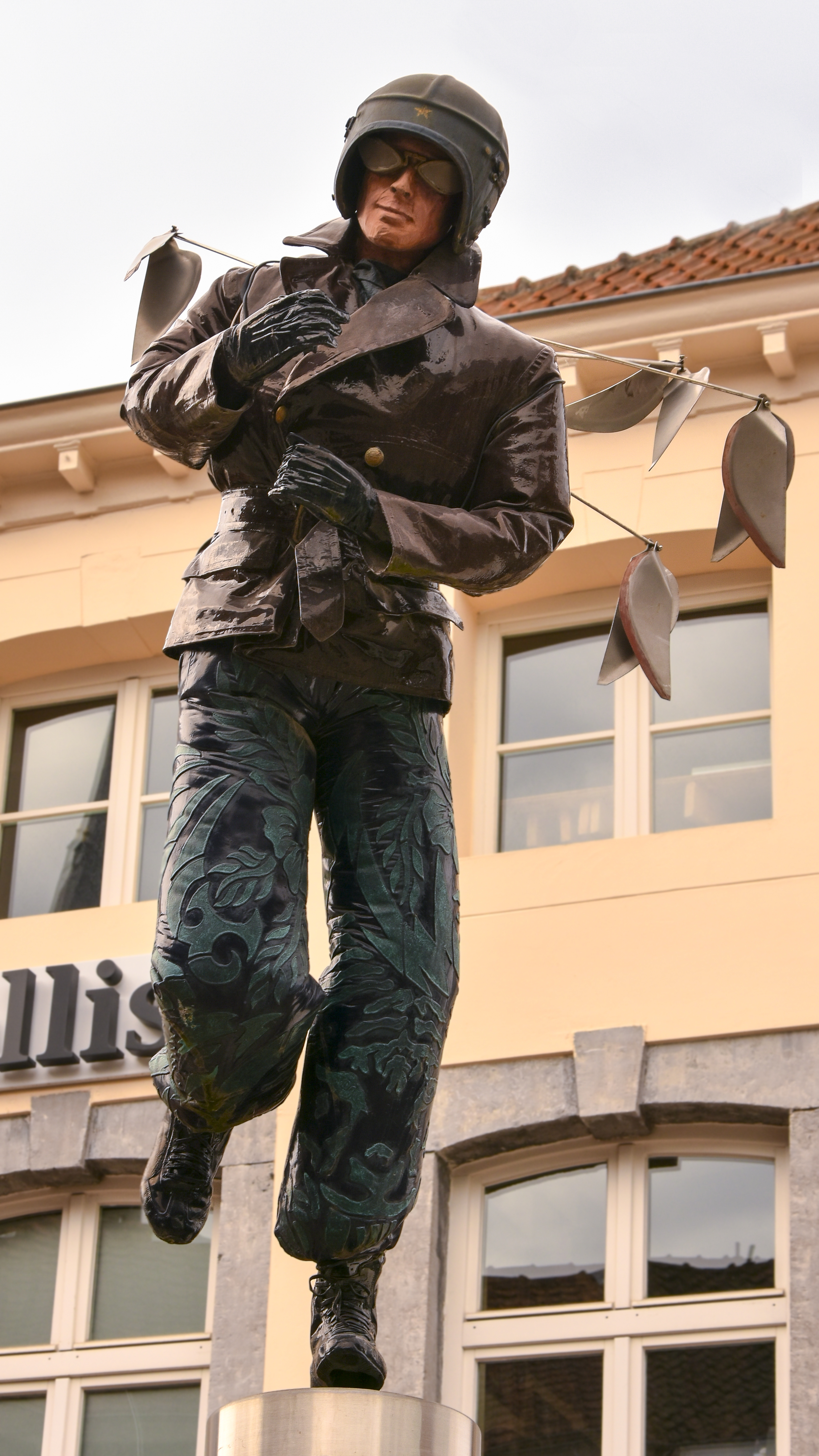
Batopillo (1940) by Panamarenko, located on the Botermarkt in Hasselt

Starting in 1970, he developed his first models of imaginary vehicles, aeroplanes, balloons or helicopters, in original and surprising appearances. Many of his sculptures are modern variants of the myth of Icarus. The question of whether his creations can actually fly is part of their mystery and appeal. His airship The Aeromodeller (1980) was a major exhibit at the MSK and S.M.A.K. Back and forth exhibition at the Museum of Fine Arts, Ghent.

The artists he admired include, amongst others: Joseph Beuys, Marcel Broodthaers, Bruce Nauman and Pablo Picasso.

In 2003, Panamarenko married Eveline Hoorens.

At the opening of a large-scale overview exhibition of his work in Brussels in 2005, Panamarenko announced his retirement as an artist. Following his stated retirement from creating visual art he promoted his own coffee brand PanamaJumbo. On 24 April 2009, VLM Airlines based in Antwerp, Belgium named one of its Fokker 50 aircraft in his honour. Panamarenko received two honorary doctorates: In 2010 at the University of Hasselt and in 2014 at the University of Mons. While retired, Panamarenko created the Waving Crabs, a series of fountains sprayed by crab figures on three stainless-steel half bowl shaped islands situated in the Zegemeer, a large pond at Knokke-Heist. He inaugurated it on 7 October 2011 stating the idea dated from 1975.

In July 2020, a graffiti artwork was made dedicated to him, opposite his former atelier.
