= Hans-Peter Feldmann =

German artist (1941–2023)

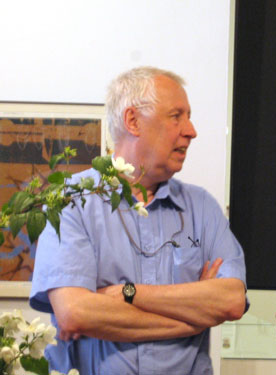
Hans-Peter Feldmann

Hans-Peter Feldmann (17 January 1941 – 24 May 2023) was a German visual artist. Feldmann's approach to art-making was one of collecting, ordering, and re-presenting.

== Biography ==
Feldmann was born on 17 January 1941. In the 1960s, Feldmann studied painting at the University of Arts and Industrial Design Linz in Austria. He began working in 1968, producing the first of the small handmade books that would become a signature part of his work. These modest books, simply entitled Bild (Picture) or Bilder (Pictures), would include one or more reproductions from a certain type - knees of women, shoes, chairs, film stars, and so on - their subjects isolated in their ubiquity and presented without captions. In 1979, Feldmann decided to pull out of the art world in order to just make books and pictures for himself. In 1989, the curator Kasper König persuaded Feldmann to exhibit his work in a gallery again.

Feldmann died on 24 May 2023, at the age of 82.

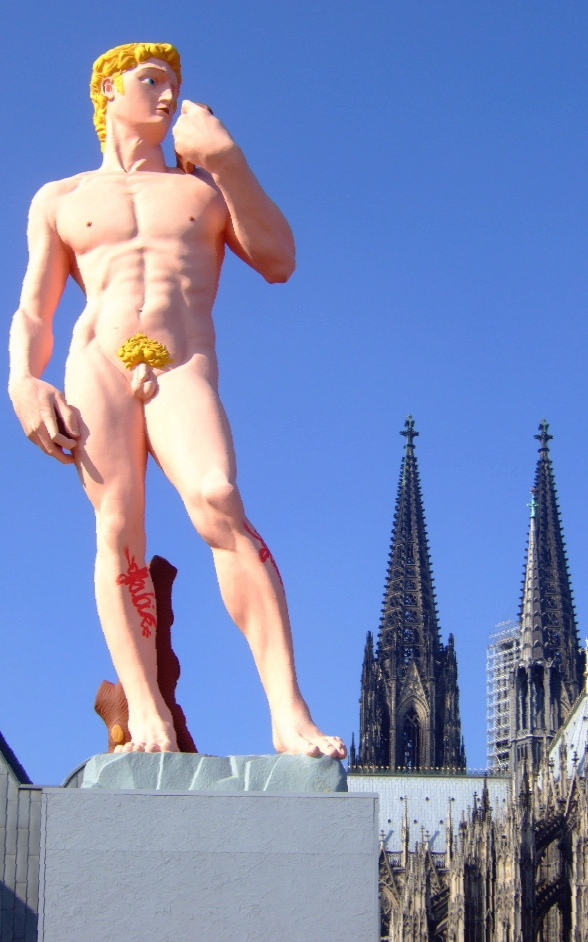
Hans-Peter Feldmann: "David" (2006) in Cologne

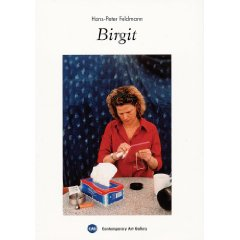
Birgit book cover

== Work ==
Feldmann was a figure in the conceptual art movement and practitioner in the artist book and multiple formats. Feldmann's approach to art-making was one of collecting, ordering, and re-presenting amateur snapshots, print photographic reproductions, toys, and trivial works of art. Feldmann reproduced and recontextualized our reading of them in books, postcards, posters or multiples.

Feldmann made his first series of books between 1968 and 1971. His works from the early 1970s include 70 snapshots depicting All the Clothes of a Woman and four Time Series projects including, for example, a row of 36 pictures of a ship moving along a river. Feldmann's series Photographs Taken From Hotel Room Windows While Traveling clusters 108 nondescript, unframed snapshots of buildings, streets, and parking lots (like other Feldmann projects, this calls to mind Ed Ruscha's photographic catalogs). 11 Left Shoes presents 11 shoes borrowed from "303 Gallery" employees, in a row on the floor. Que Sera has the words of the song of that title handwritten on the wall. Bed With Photograph simulates part of a hotel room with a slept-in bed, a side table, and a framed photograph of a woman in leopard-print pants.

Feldmann's photographic essays might have a more intimate singularity in book form. His book Secret Picturebook (1973) is a thick, densely printed, scholarly tome with little pictures of women's torsos in sexy underwear inserted at intervals. It most pointedly embodies the artist's mischievous relationship to high culture. Another book, “1967-1993 Die Toten” reproduces images from newspapers of all of the lives lost due to the violence and terrorism that permeated that period of contemporary German history.

Feldmann is known for creating installations using everyday images. In 2004–2005, MoMA P.S.1 presented 100 Years, an exhibition consisting of 101 photographic portraits of people aged 8 months to 100 years. In 2008, at the International Center of Photography, he exhibited framed front pages of 100 newspapers printed on 12 September 2001 from cities including New York, Paris, Dubai, Sydney, and Seoul.

== Recognition ==
Feldmann was named winner of the eighth biennial Hugo Boss Prize in 2010. This prize included an exhibition at the Solomon R. Guggenheim Museum, New York, in May 2011.

== Collections ==
Feldmann's work features in prominent private and public collections, such as that of the Fotomuseum Winterthur and the Barcelona Museum of Contemporary Art in Barcelona. In 2012, the artist donated one of his key works, Die Toten (The Dead), to the Berlin State Museums in Berlin.

== Art market ==
Feldmann was represented by Mehdi Chouakri Gallery in Berlin, Simon Lee Gallery in London, Galerie Francesca Pia in Zürich, Galerie Martine Aboucaya in Paris, and the 303 Gallery in New York. He did not limit the number of editions of his works, nor did he sign them.

== Publications (selected) ==
- Eine Stadt. Essen. Ausst.-Kat. Museum Folkwang, Essen 1977
- Hans-Peter Feldmann: Telefonbuch. AQ-Verlag, Dudweiler 1980. ISBN 3-922441-16-5
- Hans-Peter Feldmann: Das Museum im Kopf. Ausst.-Kat. Frankfurt, Düsseldorf. Walther König, Köln 1989. ISBN 3-88375-117-0
- Hans-Peter Feldmann: Eine Firma, Siemens. München 1991
- Hans-Peter Feldmann: Arbeiten. Kunstverein Heinsberg 1991
- Hans-Peter Feldmann: Kunstgeschichten. Paris 1992
- Hans-Peter Feldmann: Portrait. Schirmer/Mosel München 1994
- Hans-Peter Feldmann: Ferien, Secession. Wien 1994
- Hans-Peter Feldmann: Voyeur 1.Aufl. La Fleche 1994
- Hans-Peter Feldmann: Voyeur 2.Aufl. König, Köln 1997
- Hans-Peter Feldmann: Ein Energieunternehmen, EVN. Maria Enzersdorf 1997
- Hans-Peter Feldmann: Die Toten. Düsseldorf 1998
- Hans-Peter Feldmann: Bücher. Ausst.-Kat. Neues Museum Weserburg Bremen 1999 (Serie Sammlung der Künstlerbücher Bd. 23). ISBN 3-928761-44-7
- Hans-Peter Feldmann: Alle Kleider einer Frau. Düsseldorf - Toronto 1999
- Hans-Peter Feldmann, C. Konrad: Die Johanneskirche in Düsseldorf. 1999
- Hans-Peter Feldmann: Graz. Camera Austria 2000
- Hans-Peter Feldmann: Profil ohne Worte. 2 Magazine 2000
- Hans-Peter Feldmann: 100 Jahre. Anlässlich der Ausstellung im Museum Folkwang Essen. Schirmer/Mosel, München 2001. ISBN 3-88814-975-4
- Celine Duval, Hans-Peter Feldmann: cahier d’images. 7 Magazine 2001
- Hans-Peter Feldmann: Bilder / Pictures. 2002
- Helena Tatay: Hans-Peter Feldmann 272 pages, Ausst.-Kat. Centre nationale de la photographie Paris u.a. ISBN 3-9807903-0-4 (Englisch-Deutsch)
- Hans-Peter Feldmann: Vistas desde habitaciones de hotel. Barcelona 2003
- Hans-Peter Feldmann: 1941. Düsseldorf 2003
- Hans-Peter Feldmann: Babel ‘About Beauty’. Berlin 2004
- Hans-Peter Feldmann: Das kleine Mövenbuch. Walther König, Köln 2004
- Hans-Peter Feldmann: Abstrakte Kunst. Salon Verlag 2004
- Hans-Peter Feldmann: Frauen im Gefängnis. Walther König, Köln 2005
- Hans-Peter Feldmann: Paris. Salon Verlag 2005
- Hans-Peter Feldmann: Liebe/Love. Walther König, Köln 2006
- Hans-Peter Feldmann: Die beunruhigenden Musen. Hans-Peter Feldmann in der Antikensammlung der Kunsthalle zu Kiel. Ausst.-Kat. Kunsthalle Kiel, Schleswig-Holsteinischer Kunstverein, Kiel. Walther König, Köln 2006. ISBN 3-86560-080-8
- Hans-Peter Feldmann: Birgit. Contemporary Art Gallery, Vancouver 2006
- Hans-Peter Feldmann: Blau. Walther König, Köln 2006
- Hans-Peter Feldmann: Zeitungsphotos. Walther König, Köln 2006
- Hans-Peter Feldmann: Foto. Galerie Langhans, Praha 2006
- Hans-Peter Feldmann: Voyeur 3.Aufl.. König, Köln 2006
- Hans-Peter Feldmann: Buch / Book # 9. Sprengel Museum Hannover 2007
- Hans-Peter Feldmann: Smoke. Walther König, Köln 2007
- Hans-Peter Feldmann: Album. Walther König, Köln 2008
- Hans-Peter Feldmann: Voyeur 4.Auflage. Walther König, Köln 2009
- Hans-Peter Feldmann: Interview zusammen mit Hans Ulrich Obrist. Walther König, Köln 2009
- Hans-Peter Feldmann: "FRAUEN". MÖREL Books, London 2020 ISBN 978-1907071799
