= Laboratoire Agit'Art =

Art collective in Senegal

Laboratoire Agit'Art was an art collective founded in Dakar, Senegal in 1973 by writer and performer Youssouf John with goal of revitalising artistic production and critique institutional frameworks and the philosophy of Negritude in particular. John soon left for Martinique and the group/workshop was handed on to Issa Samb. Other key members included El Hadj Sy (El Sy), Bouna Medoune Seye, Djibril Diop Mambéty, and Youssoupha Dione.

The group consisting of artists, writers, film-makers, performance artists and musicians. The group was based at Dakar's squatted Village des Arts until the squatted village was evicted by the army ion 23 September 1983

The collective made work in a variety of medium, including paint, found objects, sculpture, performance art and street art. Their exhibitions were organised around satyrical theatrical productions of Leopold Senghor and Aime Cesaire's works. The collective marked a move away from Negritude philosophy of Senghor and Cesaire and towards a more avant-garde critique of both modernism and traditional ideas while still drawing from both.
