= Henrik Plenge Jakobsen =

Danish conceptual artist (born 1967)

- Born: 1967 (age 58–59); Copenhagen, Denmark
- Education: Royal Danish Academy of Art; École nationale supérieure des Beaux-Arts
- Occupation: Artist

Henrik Plenge Jakobsen (born 1967 in Copenhagen, Denmark) is a Danish conceptual artist, who works in a variety of media, from sculpture and installation art to performance art and public intervention.

He has studied at the Royal Danish Academy of Art, Copenhagen, Denmark, from 1987 to 1994, École nationale supérieure des Beaux-Arts and Institut des hautes études en arts plastiques, Paris, France, from 1992 to 1993.

Henrik Plenge Jakobsen lives in Copenhagen.

== Work ==
Plenge Jakobsens project is socio-critical in the sense that he examines and discusses political, economical, cultural and social structures forming the foundation of modern life. Like the Situationists, he is interested in finding a meaningful art form capable of defining a place in the public space, while directly making use of everyday institutions. His project does not seek to cannibalize reality but to incorporate reality into the work itself. His work is radical exactly because it insists on the work's real presence rather than interrogating the foundation of reality. For Plenge Jakobsen, art and reality are not separate spheres that can be temporarily forced together. Existing in the world, art represents one of the realities that constitute life. Henrik Plenge Jakobsens work can be described as a configuration of visual elements in spatial arrangements, often involving an additional element of action or performance. Many of his works combine sculptural elements and objects in a plastic display positioned between sculpture and installation. Differing from the theatrical and systemic, "total" form of classic installation art. Plenge Jakobsens installation stratagems are based on a more unrestrained, flexible arrangement in which the room is merely an arbitrary architectural frame rather than a meaningful collaborator.

== Exhibitions ==
Recent solo exhibitions have included Eggjastokkur (2011) and Liten Skandinavisk Teori (2019) at NoPlace, Oslo; Mainframe at Kunstverein für Die Rheinlande und Westfalen, Düsseldorf in 2010; Manhattan Engineering District, FRAC Pays de la Loire, Carquefou, France in 2007; J’Accuse, South London Gallery, London, England in 2005 and Circus Portikus, Portikus, Frankfurt am Main, Germany in 2003.

Henrik Plenge Jakobsen is represented by Galerie Patricia Dorfmann, Paris, France.
