= Hans Ulrich Obrist =

Swiss art curator, critic and historian

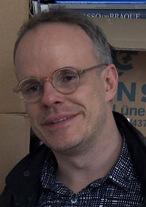
- Obrist in 2010
- Born: 1968 (age 57–58); Weinfelden, Switzerland
- Occupation: Art curator
- Employer: Serpentine Galleries
- Notable work: The Interview Project
- Spouse: Koo Jeong A

Hans Ulrich Obrist (born 1968) is a Swiss art curator, critic, and art historian. He is Artistic Director at the Serpentine Galleries, London. Obrist is the author of The Interview Project, an extensive ongoing project of interviews. He is also co-editor of the Cahiers d'Art review. He lives and works in London.

== Life and work ==
Obrist was born in Weinfelden, Switzerland on May 24, 1968. His father worked in the construction industry and his mother was a teacher. He grew up in the Alps near Lake Constance. His interest in art developed at an early age, “first of all, through the graffiti,” via exposure to street art in Switzerland in the 1980s, particularly the work of Harald Naegeli. His interest in museums began when his parents took him to the library of a monastery at the age of 6. Aged 6, Obrist was struck by a car. In his childhood, Obrist was "building museums curated in my bedroom" by decorating his room with postcards.

From 1985 to 1991, Obrist travelled around Europe to visit artists in their studios. The first artists he visited were Peter Fischli & David Weiss.

Aged 23, when as a student in Politics and Economics in St. Gallen, Switzerland, in 1991, Obrist created an exhibition in the kitchen of his apartment entitled "The Kitchen Show/"World Soup". It featured work by Christian Boltanski and Peter Fischli & David Weiss. Obrist and Hou Hanru co-curated the traveling exhibition Cities on the Move, which ran from 1997 until 1999 and examined the rapid urbanisation in East and Southeast Asia with contemporary art, architecture and film. The exhibition was on display at Secession in Vienna, CAPC musée d’art contemporain in Bordeaux, and the Hayward Gallery in London.

Obrist curated the 2022 exhibition "Worldbuilding: Gaming and Art in the Digital Age" as part of the fifteenth anniversary of the Julia Stoschek "time-based art" Collection in Düsseldorf. It was showcased again at the Centre Pomplidou-Metz in Metz from December 2023 until January 2024.

=== museum in progress, 1993–2000 ===
Obrist curated projects for the art initiative museum in progress in Vienna. These included a museum in progress exhibition with Alighiero Boetti held on board of Austrian Airlines in 1993 (using images from Boetti's “Airplanes” series, both in every in-flight magazine and as a free jigsaw puzzle, given to passengers); Interventions in the daily newspaper Der Standard 1995 with artists like Christian Marclay, Lawrence Weiner; and Travelling Eye in the magazine Profil 1995/1996 with John Baldessari, Nan Goldin, Felix Gonzalez-Torres and Gerhard Richter amongst others.

Obrist has also been a jury member of the art project Safety Curtain, which museum in progress has held at the Vienna State Opera since 1998 with artists including Tauba Auerbach, David Hockney, Joan Jonas, Jeff Koons, Maria Lassnig, Rosemarie Trockel, Cy Twombly and Carrie Mae Weems.

In 1993, Obrist founded the Museum Robert Walser and began to run the "Migrateurs" program at the Musée d'Art Moderne de la Ville de Paris where he was a curator for contemporary art.

In 1996, Obrist co-curated Manifesta 1, the first edition of the roving European biennial of contemporary art.

=== Musée d'Art Moderne de la Ville de Paris, 2000–2006 ===
In 2003, Obrist curated, as part of the Venice Biennale, "Utopia Station"; an interview with Obrist about the project appears in Sarah Thornton's Seven Days in the Art World.

By 2005, The Guardian reported that Obrist had interviewed to succeed Philip Dodd as the director of the Institute of Contemporary Arts in London.

=== Serpentine Galleries, 2006–present ===
In 2006, Serpentine Galleries director Julia Peyton-Jones appointed Obrist as her co-director of exhibitions and programs. Since Peyton-Jones left the organization in 2016, Obrist has worked alongside successive co-directors Yana Peel (2016–2019) and Bettina Korek (since 2019).

In addition to his role at the Serpentine Galleries, Obrist has been the international programs advisor to the Garage Museum of Contemporary Art in Moscow (since 2018) and the artistic adviser to The Shed in New York (since 2018).

While maintaining official curatorial positions, Obrist was also the co-founder of the Brutally Early Club in 2006, a discussion group open to all that met at Starbucks in London, Berlin, New York and Paris at 6:30 a.m. The club was created so that Obrist could fit in conversations with artists before spending the day at his desk. It has since been replaced with the OM3AM Club which meets in the middle of the night at different locations such as 24-hour motorway service stations.

In 2007, Obrist co-curated "Il Tempo del Postino" with Philippe Parreno for the Manchester International Festival. This was also presented at Art Basel in 2009, organised by Fondation Beyeler and Theater Basel.

In 2008, Obrist curated Everstill at the Lorca House in Granada.

In 2013, along with Simon Castets and Luc Saucier, Obrist co-founded the 89plus, an international, multi-platform research project with support from Google, conceived as a mapping of the "digitally native" generation of those born in or after 1989.

Obrist also acted as non-executive artistic co-director and as a senior advisor to LUMA Arles, which was launched in 2013 by Maja Hoffmann.

In 2014, Obrist curated the Swiss Pavilion at the 14th International Architecture Biennale in Venice, where he presented Lucius Burckhardt and Cedric Price - A stroll through a fun palace; the building was designed by architects Herzog & de Meuron, and the program was developed with artists Liam Gillick, Philippe Parreno, Tino Sehgal and Dominique Gonzalez-Foerster.

In 2022, Obrist organised a Jota Mombaça performance staged on San Giacomo in Paludo to kick off the construction of an arts space operated by the Fondazione Sandretto Re Rebaudengo.

=== The Interview project ===
Obrist's interest in interviews was first born during his student years when he read two extensive conversations: the first between Pierre Cabanne and Marcel Duchamp; the second between David Sylvester and Francis Bacon. Obrist said that "These books somehow brought me to art...They were like oxygen, and were the first time that the idea of an interview with an artist as a medium became of interest to me. They also sparked my interest in the idea of sustained conversations—of interviews recorded over a period of time, perhaps over the course of many years; the Bacon/Sylvester interviews took place over three long sessions, for example."

Over the years, Obrist has recorded nearly 2000 hours of interviews, which he refers to as "an endless conversation". He began publishing these interviews in Artforum in 1996 and eleven of these interviews were released as Interviews Volume 1 in 2003. Volume 2 was published in Summer 2010. In these released interviews, a total of 69 artists, architects, writers, film-makers, scientists, philosophers, musicians and performers share their unique experiences and insights.

Obrist has also published a series of books called "The Conversation Series," which features the longer interviews in his archive. To date, 28 books have been published, each containing a lengthy interview with cultural figures including John Baldessari, Zaha Hadid, Dominique Gonzalez-Foerster, Yoko Ono, Robert Crumb and Rem Koolhaas. A number of Obrist's interviews have also appeared in the Berlin culture magazine 032c, including those with artists Elaine Sturtevant and Richard Hamilton, historian Eric Hobsbawm, and structural engineer Cecil Balmond of Arup.

In 2005, Obrist initiated a series of "marathons", a series of public events he conceived in Stuttgart. The first in the Serpentine series, the "Interview Marathon" in 2006, involved interviews with leading figures in contemporary culture over 24 hours, conducted by Obrist and architect Rem Koolhaas. This was followed by the "Experiment Marathon", conceived by Obrist and artist Olafur Eliasson in 2007, which included 50 experiments by speakers across both arts and science, including Peter Cook, Neil Turok, Kim Gordon, Simone Forti, Fia Backstrom and Joseph Grigely. There was also the "Manifesto Marathon" in 2008 and the "Poetry Marathon" in 2009, which consisted of poems read aloud by artists and writers including Gilbert & George, Tracey Emin, Nick Laird, Geoffrey Hill, and James Fenton.

The 2014 "Extinction Marathon: Visions of the Future" linked the humanities and the sciences to discussions of environmental and human impact on the world today. It was programmed with artist Gustav Metzger whose research addresses issues of extinction and climate change. Notable participants included artists Etel Adnan, Ed Atkins, Jesse Darling, Gilbert & George, Katja Novitskova, Yoko Ono, Susan Hiller, Marguerite Humeau, Trevor Paglen, Cornelia Parker amongst notable model and actor Lily Cole and founder of The Whole Earth Catalog and co-founder of The Long Now Foundation Stewart Brand.

In his ongoing Instagram-based project, popularly dubbed "Remember to Dream!" after his related 2023 publication, Obrist posts handwritten notes from artists, writers, designers and other creatives in an effort to revive the art of handwriting in the digital age. Of the project, Obrist has said, "It's so much to do with presence. It's about the presence of the person who writes it [the note]."

=== Curatorial practice ===
Obrist is an advocate and archivist for artists, and has said: "I really do think artists are the most important people on the planet, and if what I do is a utility and helps them, then that makes me happy. I want to be helpful." He is known for his lively pace and emphasis on inclusion in all cultural activities.

Obrist's practice includes an ongoing exploration of the history of art institutions and curatorial practice. In his early 20s he began to research the topic: "At a certain moment, when I started doing my own shows, I felt it would be really interesting to know what is the history of my profession. I realized that there was no book, which was kind of a shock." He has since tried to rectify this gap with exhibitions on curating and a book entitled A Brief History of Curating. This volume, which is part of Obrist's Interviews project (see above) compiles interviews from some of the leading curators of the 20th century. Obrist's collected volume pieces together "a patchwork of fragments," underlining a network of relationships within the art.

In keeping with his desire to explore the world of art and view it as an open system, Obrist has long advocated a participatory model for his activities. One early project, 1993's "do it", is an ongoing project that consists of instructions set out by artists for anyone to follow. In his introduction to the project, Obrist notes that "do it stems from an open exhibition model, and exhibition in progress. Individual instructions can open empty spaces for occupation and invoke possibilities for the interpretations and rephrasing of artworks in a totally free manner. "do it" affects interpretations based on location, and calls for a dovetailing of local structures with the artworks themselves. The diverse cities in which "do it" takes place actively construct the artwork context and endow it with their individual marks or distinctions."

== Other activities ==
Obrist is a contributing editor of 032c magazine, Artforum and Paradis Magazine, among others.

Obrist has lectured internationally at academic and art institutions including European Graduate School in Saas-Fee, University of East Anglia, Southbank Centre, Institute of Historical Research, and Architectural Association.

Obrist was on the juries that selected Cedric Price for the Österreichischer Friedrich Kiesler-Preis für Architektur und Kunst (2002); Loukia Alavanou for the Deste Prize (2007); Nav Haq and Jay Sanders for the Independent Vision Curatorial Award (2012); Rachel Rose for the Frieze Art Award (2015); Otobong Nkanga for the Belgian Art Prize (2017); Cathy Wilkes (2017), Sheela Gowda (2019) and Lubaina Himid (2023) for the Maria Lassnig Prize; Diego Marcon for the MAXXI Bulgari Prize (2018); Sondra Perry for Rolls-Royce’s first-ever Moving-Image Dream Commission (2021); and Nifemi Marcus Bello for the Hublot Design Prize (2022); President of the 19th Venice Biennale of Architecture Jury (2025); among others. As of February 2026 he is working on a catalogue raisonné.

Obrist holds various positions at art organisations, including the following:

- Kino der Kunst Festival, member of the board of trustees (since 2013)
- Flash Art, Member of the Advisory Board
- Museum Berggruen, member of the international council
- Thyssen-Bornemisza Art Contemporary, member of the advisory board
- Ullens Center for Contemporary Art (UCCA), member of the advisory board (2014–2015)
- Locarno Festival, member of the jury (2012)
- Manifesta, member of the supervisory board (1994–2002)

== Awards ==
In 2009 and 2016, Obrist was ranked number one in ArtReview's annual list of the art world's one-hundred most powerful people.

Other honours include:

- 2007 – New York Prize Senior Fellowship for 2007–2008, awarded by the Van Alen Institute
- 2009 – Honorary Fellow of the Royal Institute of British Architects (RIBA)
- 2011 – CCS Bard Award for Curatorial Excellence, awarded by the Center for Curatorial Studies, Bard College
- 2015 – International Folkwang Prize

== Personal life ==
Obrist has lived in a few house museums, like Sir John Soane's house in London and Luis Barragán's house in Mexico City. He also spent a month in a Paris hotel, where he would have different artists install an artwork in his room every day.

Obrist is in a relationship with South Korean artist Koo Jeong A. They share an apartment in London's Kensington district.

In 2025, Obrist published a memoir Life in Progress, commissioned by Éditions du Seuil, and published by Allen Lane (UK).
