= Matt Mullican =

American visual artist

- Born: September 18, 1951 (age 75); Santa Monica, California, U.S.
- Education: California Institute of the Arts
- Occupations: Artist, teacher
- Parents: Lee Mullican (father); Luchita Hurtado (mother)

Matt Mullican (born September 18, 1951) is an American artist and educator. He is the child of artists Lee Mullican and Luchita Hurtado. Mullican lives and works in both Berlin and New York City.

== Early life and education ==
Matt Mullican was born on September 18, 1951, in Santa Monica, California, to parents Lee Mullican and Luchita Hurtado. His mother was Venezuela born. In childhood he lived in Caracas, Venezuela for one year.

Mullican received his BFA degree from California Institute of the Arts (CalArts) in 1974.

== Career ==
Mullican rose to prominence as a member of The Pictures Generation along with such artists as Troy Brauntuch, Jack Goldstein, David Salle, James Welling, Sherrie Levine, Cindy Sherman, Louise Lawler, Richard Prince and Robert Longo. His work is concerned with systems of knowledge, meaning, language, and signification. Mullican also works with the relationship between perception and reality, between the ability to see something and the ability to represent it.

Since the 1970s, Mullican has been known for his performances done while under hypnosis. During these performances, Mullican channels an alter ego known as 'That Person', who displays extreme and erratic behavior. Drawings made by Mullican while hypnotized are frequently exhibited and attributed to 'That Person'.

Mullican's work has been exhibited nationally and internationally since the early 1970s at venues including The Metropolitan Museum of Art, New York, Haus Der Kunst, Munich, Germany, the National Galerie, Berlin, Germany, the Stedelijk Museum, Schiedam, Netherlands, Museum of Contemporary Art, Los Angeles, CA, and The Museum of Modern Art, NY. Mullican's work has been reviewed in Artforum, the Frankfurter Allgemeine Zeitung, The New York Times, and Modern Painters, among others. Mullican has been exhibited in 2017 on the Petit Palais' facade in Paris during the FIAC art fair with his giant piece of art "For Worlds Between Five".

=== Teaching ===
Mullican was a professor at the University of Fine Arts of Hamburg (German: Hochschule für bildende Künste Hamburg) in Hamburg, Germany, from 2009 to 2018. He has also taught and lectured at Columbia University; The School of Visual Arts; the Rijksakademie in Amsterdam; The London Institute; and the Chelsea College of Art and Design.
