= Christine Macel =

French curator (born 1969)

- Born: 1969 (age 55–56); Paris, France
- Occupation: Curator
- Known for: Director of 2017 Venice Biennale

Christine Macel (born 1969) is a French curator. She was the director of the 2017 Venice Biennale while holding the position of chief curator at the Centre Pompidou from 2000–2022. In 2022 she is nominated Director of the Musée des arts décoratifs and Musée Nissim de Camondo. She is now a scientific and artistic advisor for the Musée des Arts Décoratifs, Paris.

== Early life ==
Christine Macel was born in Paris in 1969.

== Career ==
Macel is a contributor to several magazines such as Artforum, Flash Art, Art Press, Parkett and Cahiers du Musée national d'art moderne.

Macel was the chief curator at the Centre Pompidou from 2000–2022, where she started the museum's contemporary art department. She curated shows of Sophie Calle, Gabriel Orozco, Nan Goldin, Philippe Parreno and others.

At the Venice Biennale, Macel curated the French pavilion in 2013 (Anri Sala), and the Belgian pavilion in 2007 (Éric Duyckaerts).

In 2022, Macel was appointed director of the Musée des Arts Décoratifs in Paris.
