= Raffray =

Raffray is a French surname. Notable people with the surname include:

- Achille Raffray (1844–1923), French diplomat, traveller, zoologist, and entomologist
- André Raffray (1925–2010), French graphic artist
