= Antoine Schneck =

French photographer

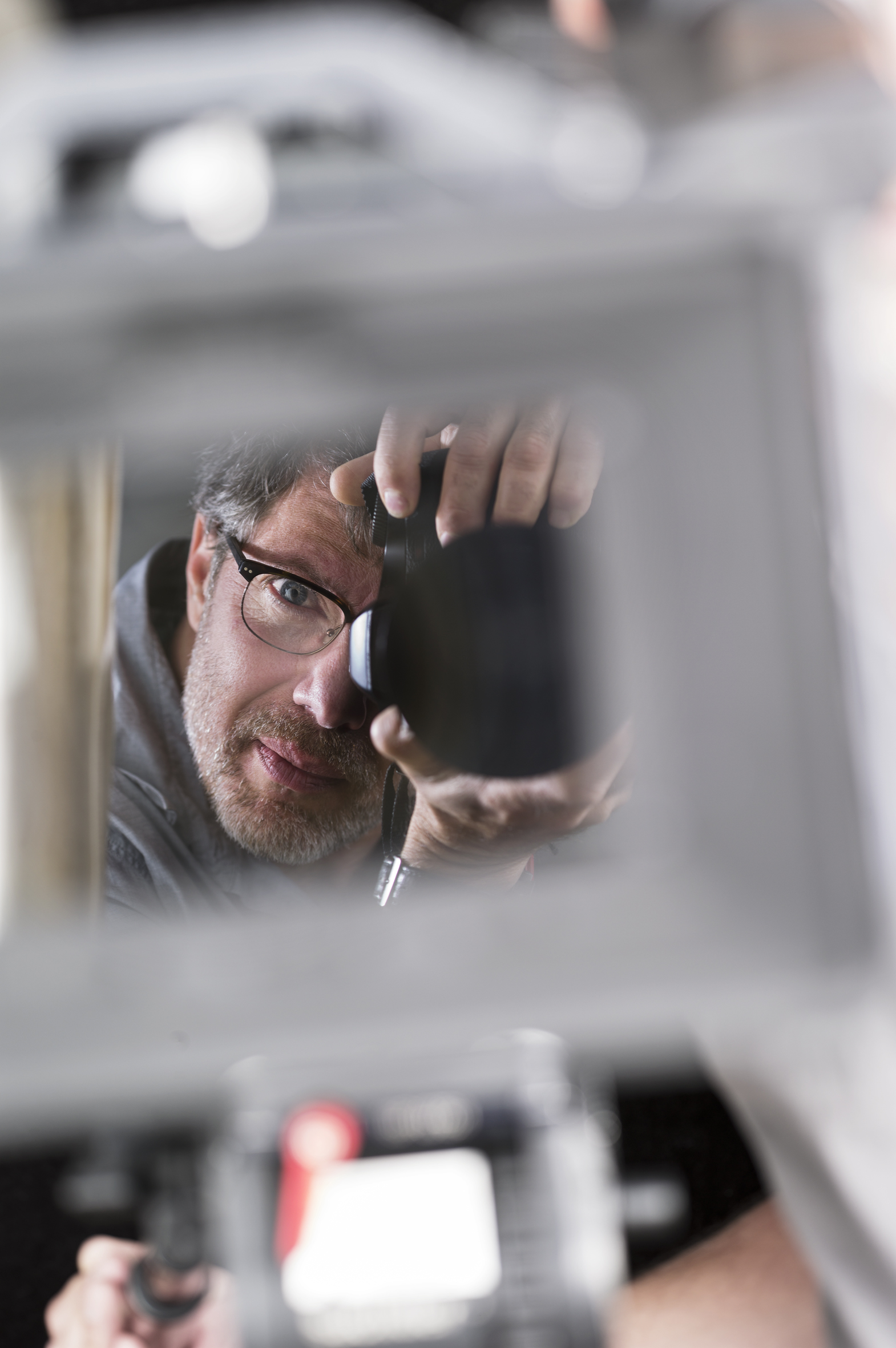
- Antoine Schneck selfportrait 2012
- Born: August 27, 1963 (age 63); Suresnes, France
- Known for: Photography
- Website: antoineschneck.com

Antoine Schneck is a French visual-art photographer born in 1963 in Suresnes, France. He is known in particular for his portraits and still lifes with a black background. A retrospective monograph of his work was published in October 2021 by in fine éditions d'art.

Since 2018 Schneck is also a board member of France's Société des auteurs dans les arts graphiques et plastiques (ADAGP).

== Personal life ==
Schneck's father was a maxillofacial surgeon.

== Exhibitions ==
- 2022
  - Pixelophonie, NFT by Antoine Schneck and Hugues Hervé, Opéra Comique, Paris
- 2021
  - L'Autre, Galerie Berthet-Aittouarès, Paris.
- 2020
  - Le Passeur, Galerie Berthet-Aittouarès, Paris.
- 2019
  - Antoine Schneck dans tous ses états, Galerie Berthet-Aittouarès, Paris.
- 2018
  - Du masque à l'âme, La Confluence, Betton.
  - Du rêve à la réalité, au cœur des montagnes Miao, Couleurs de Chine, DS World, Paris.
- 2017
  - Du masque à l'âme, Le Kiosque, Vannes
  - Young Master Art Prize Exhibition (4th Edition), Gallery 8, London
  - Autophoto, Fondation Cartier pour l'art contemporain, Paris
- 2015
  - Antoine Schneck, Le Carmel, Tarbes.
- 2014 - 2018
  - Soldats inconnus, Salle des Palmes, Arc de Triomphe, Paris.
- 2012 - 2020 (exposition permanente)
  - Leur Chien, Château de Beauregard (Loir-et-Cher)
- 2011
  - L'été 2011 au Sénat, Orangerie du Sénat, Paris.
  - Les Gisants, Basilica of Saint-Denis, Paris.
- 2010
  - Leur chien, Musée de la Chasse et de la Nature, Paris

== Works ==
- Antoine Schneck, foreword by Pierre Wat, published by InFine éditions d'art, 2021.
- Antoine Schneck, du masque à l'âme, foreword to the catalogue of the exhibit by Pierre Wat et Jérôme Clément, Editions galerie Berthet-Aittouarès, 2015.
- Les gisants de Saint-Denis, préface du catalogue de l'exposition par Pierre Pachet, Éditions du Patrimoine, 2011.
- Leur chien, foreword to the catalogue of the exhibit by Claude d’Anthenaise, curator of Musée de la Chasse et de la Nature, 2010.
- Antoine Schneck Photographies, texts by Laurent Boudier and Yaël Pachet, Éditions Galerie Berthet-Aittouarès, 2010.
- La cuisine de la Diaspora, text by Deborah Haccoun, Minerva, 2007.
- Trilogy, Burkina Faso, portrait by Antoine Schneck, Revue Soon, 2007.
- Déco & récup, Éditions Aubanel, 2007.
- Intérieur Parisiens vu par Dora Tauzin, Édition Gap-Japan, 2005.
- Envies de gâteaux, text by Sylvie Girard-Lagorce, Flammarion, 2003.
- Envies de bonbons, text by Sylvie Girard-Lagorce, Flammarion, 2003.
- Jardins de Poitiers, text by Agnès Zamboni, Patrimoine et Médias, 2001.
- Les Tsiganes, text by Hugues Moutouh, collection Dominos, Flammarion, 2000.
- Tsiganes en Roumanie, text by Bernard Houliat, Éditions du Rouergue, 1999.
