= Diana and Her Nymphs Leaving for the Hunt =

Painting by Peter Paul Rubens and Jan Bruegel the Elder

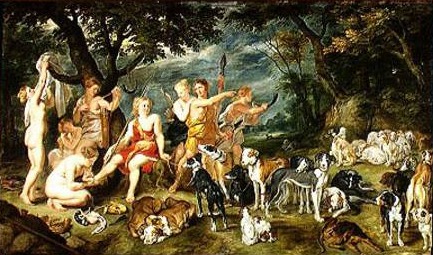
Diana and Her Nymphs Leaving for the Hunt (1623-1624)

Diana and Her Nymphs Leaving for the Hunt is a 1623–1624 oil on panel painting by Peter Paul Rubens (figures) and Jan Brueghel the Elder (landscape and animals). It is now in the Musée de la Chasse et de la Nature in Paris. During his life, Rubens hoped to encourage the painting of classicist hunting scenes.

The figures were painted by Rubens, while the landscape and animals are by Brueghel's hand. The work is made on a panel of 57 x 98 cm and can be viewed in the Musée de la Chasse et de la Nature in Paris.

There has been much discussion about the quality and provenance of the painting. It is not normal for Rubens to sign his work, which is the case in this painting. Brueghel did sign his works. Nor is the painting an example of Rubens' style. It is too gallant and too spacious for that. The brushstrokes are not large and virtuoso, which is characteristic of Rubens. Nevertheless, the painting is an example of a finished combination between Rubens and Brueghel.

Brueghel is known for his beautiful paintings of landscapes, animals and flowers. For the figures he collaborated with other painters, as is the case here. Brueghel often collaborated with Rubens before the latter left for Italy in 1610.
