= Institut des hautes études en arts plastiques =

Post-graduate art school in Paris, France

Coordinates: 48.8568°N 2.3332°E

The Institut des hautes études en arts plastiques (IHEAP) is a post-graduate art school based in Paris for research and experimentation in art.

== History ==
=== IHEAP 1985–1995 ===
In 1985, the City of Paris commissioned Pontus Hultén to design a graduate school for research in contemporary art, similar in spirit to the Bauhaus and Black Mountain College in the U.S., to function as an alternative to the École nationale supérieure des beaux-arts. Hulten conceived of the Institut as a center for contemporary research in artistic creation, with just 20 students, all graduates, each year. The Institute operated from 1988 to 1995.

=== IHEAP 2012 ===
In 2012, the Biennale de Paris open a new Institut des hautes études en arts plastiques (IHEAP), according to its own viewpoints while also reactivating those of earlier institutions. Drawing on the original model, the new IHEAP kept its name, intentions, idea of a simple structure, necessity of transversality and discussion, and its international dimension.

=== Buren Lawsuit ===
In March 2015, the French artist Daniel Buren, one of the professors in the original IHEAP, filed suit in the High Court of Paris against the newer IHEAP organization founded in 2012. In an open letter published on his web site, Buren claimed that the 2012 IHEAP improperly usurped the name and reputation of the original IHEAP.

== Session 2012–2014 ==
Work topics:

- "The Invisual"
- "The Exhibition: A Compromise"
- "A History of Art Through the Dematerialisation of the Art Object"
- "Art Out of Art"
- "The Splendor and Misery of The Art Object"
- "How can The Art Object be a Problem?"
- "What is The Public of Indifference?"
- "Imagine the Cultural Action of the Decades 2020-2050″
- "Parallel Economies of Art"
- "Basic Notions of Disobedience"
- "Horizontal Institution"
- "The Norm of Art"
- "What is The Terminology of Art? New Words for Existing Realities"
- "Introduction of The Notion of Strategy in Art"
- "To Be Thought By Art"
- "To Think Art"

=== Professors and lecturers since 1985 ===
- Abdel Kebir Khatibi, artist
- Afrika, artist
- Giovanni Anselmo, artist
- Jean-Michel Arnold, director of the CNRS
- Michael Asher, artist
- Bernard Baissait, designer
- Robert Barry, artist
- Pr. Étienne-Émile Baulieu, biochemist
- Aurélie Bousquet, artist
- Rose-Marie Barrientos, art historian, critic
- Mikaîl Bode, art critic
- Robert Bordaz, State Councilor, attorney
- Ida Biard, gallery owner
- Patrick Bouchain, builder
- Benjamin Buchloh, art historian
- Daniel Buren, artist
- Germano Celant, art critic
- Jean-François Chevrier, art historian, critic
- Michel Chion, composer, essayist
- Michel Claura, attorney, art critic
- Gilles Clément, landscape
- Bruno Cora, art critic
- Jacqueline Dauriac, artist
- Loïc Depecker, terminologist, linguist
- Pierre Descargues, journalist
- Jean Douchet, cinema critic
- Éric Duyckaerts, artist
- Guillaume du Boisbaudry, philosopher
- Éric Fabre, gallery owner
- Luciano Fabro, artist
- Jean-Baptiste Farkas, operate under Glitch
- Serge Fauchereau, writer, art historian
- Peter Fend, artist
- Dan Graham, artist
- Niki de Saint Phalle, artist
- Jérôme de Noiremont, gallery owner
- Hans Haacke, artist
- Jürgen Harten, museographer
- Danièle Huillet, film director
- Pontus Hulten, museographer
- Ilya Kabakov, artist
- Nelly Kaplan, film director
- Caroline Keppi, artist
- Pr. Dr. David Klatzmann, biologist
- Komar et Melamid, artist
- Jannis Kounellis, artist
- Robert Kramer, film director
- Claes Oldenburg, artist
- Bertrand Lavier, artist
- Jean Le Gac, artist
- Gérard Legrand, cinematic essayist
- Marine Legrand, researcher
- André Éric Létourneau, artist manoevrer
- Jean-François Lyotard, philosopher
- Giulio Macchi, curator
- Philippe Mairesse, operate under Local Access
- Jean-Hubert Martin, museographer
- Francesco Masci, philosopher
- Michael Mc Clure, writer
- Yves Michaud, philosopher
- Ghislain Mollet-Viéville, agent of art
- Pierre Monjaret, artist
- Matt Mullican, artist
- Jean-Louis Maubant, museographer
- Valeri Naoumov, film director
- Michel Nuridsany, journalist, art critic
- Jean Nouvel, architect
- Giuseppe Panza di Biumo, collector
- Renzo Piano, architect
- Huang Yong Ping, artist
- Clovis Prévost, film director
- Anna Ptakowska, gallery owner
- André Raffray, artist
- Jean-Pierre Raynaud, artist
- Roland Recht, museographer
- Hubert Renard, artist
- Denys Riout, art historian
- Paul Robert, runer artist
- Christian Ruby, philosopher
- Raoul Ruiz, film director
- Edward Rusha, artist
- Sarkis, artist
- Jean-Noël Schifano, journalist, writer
- Monique Sicard, researcerh at CNRS
- Thomas Shannon, artist
- Sylvain Soussan, operate under clouds museum
- Pietro Spartà, gallery owner
- Robert Storr, critic, writer
- Jean-Marie Straub, film director
- Harald Szeemann, museographer, curator
- Daniel Templon, gallery owner
- Jean-Claude Terrasson, essayist
- Jean Tinguely, artist
- Andrej Tisma, artist
- Coosje Van Bruggen, artist
- Liliane Viala, artist
- Lawrence Weiner, artist
- Yang Jiechang, artist
- Jean-Claude Zylberstein, attorney

=== Notable alumni ===
- Delphine Coindet, artist
- Dominique Gonzalez-Foerster
- Pierre Huyghe, artist
- Mathieu Mercier, artist
- Philippe Parreno, artist
- Xavier Veilhan, artist
