= Delphine Coindet =

French artist

- Born: 1969; Albertville, France
- Education: École des Beaux-Arts in Nantes, Institut des hautes études en arts plastiques
- Known for: Visual art, installation, scenography
- Website: www.delphine-coindet.net

Delphine Coindet (born 1969 in Albertville) is a French installation artist.

== Education ==
Coindet graduated from the École des Beaux-Arts in Nantes in 1992. She attended in 1993 the post-graduate art school Institut des hautes études en arts plastiques in Paris.

== Career ==
Coindet's practice includes sculpture, installation, text and performance. Her work has been exhibited in international institutions and galleries since the mid nineties, including the Kunsthaus Baselland (Basel), the MUDAC (Neuchâtel), Fri-art (Fribourg), the Villa Medicis (Rome), Art Since the Summer of '69 (New York), SolwayJones (Los Angeles), the Musée d'art moderne de la ville de Paris, the Galerie nationale du Jeu de Paume (Paris), the MAC VAL (Vitry), Galerie Parra & Romero (Madrid), Galerie Anne Mosseri (Zurich), and Galerie Laurent Godin (Paris).

== Collections ==
Her work is included in the collections of the Musée d'art moderne de la ville de Paris, the Centre national des arts plastiques, the Frac des Pays de la Loire, the Frac Centre and the MAC VAL, among others.
