= Laurent Godin =

French curator and art dealer

Laurent Godin (born 1965) is a French curator, author, and contemporary art gallery owner of Galerie Laurent Godin.

== Life and career ==
Godin graduated from the École nationale supérieure des beaux-arts de Lyon in 1990 and subsequently worked for several years alongside gallerist Roger Pailhas, first in Marseille and then in Paris. In 1993, he collaborated with Pontus Hulten to oversee the sculpture park "Future lies ahead" for Taejon Expo'93 in South Korea. From 2000 to 2005, Godin served as the Director of the Contemporary Art Center of the City of Lyon, Le Rectangle, where he organized notable exhibitions by artists such as Wang Du, the Atelier Van Lieshout, Stephan Balkenhol, Anselm Kiefer, and others. In 2005, he curated and organized a large sculpture exhibition in Jinan, China, featuring artists like Daniel Buren, Pierre Huyghe, and Anne Veronica Janssen. Convinced of the essential role of galleries in supporting artists, he founded his own gallery in 2005.

== Galerie Laurent Godin ==
Initially located in The Marais district, Galerie Laurent Godin relocated in 2015 to a 500-square-meter space in the 13th arrondissement of Paris. This new location allowed for a different pace and type of programming and exhibitions, including group exhibitions, solo shows, conversations, screenings, and more. In 2025, the gallery moved from Paris to Arles.

Godin's gallery represents around twenty emerging and established artists, including Scoli Acosta, Sylvie Auvray, Peter Buggenhout, Hsia-Fei Chang, Claude Closky, Delphine Coindet, Delphine Reist, Camila Oliveira Fairclough, Aleksandra Mir, Mika Rottenberg, Henrik Samuelsson, Haim Steinbach, Alan Vega, Wang Du, among others. Their work shares a common goal of contributing to the discussion and evolution of contemporary art, with a particular focus on political and socio-cultural fields.

Galerie Laurent Godin also represents its artists at some of the most important contemporary art fairs in New York, Miami, Mexico, Brussels, Cologne, Paris, and Geneva.

== Publications ==
In addition to his exhibition programs, Laurent Godin has developed a significant publishing activity to accompany them, producing monographs, catalogs, and artists' books.

- Actualités : no comment, 2002 ISBN 978-2-9515553-3-4
- Atelier Van Lieshout : Sportopia, 2003 ISBN 2-951555-34-2
- Aleksandra Mir, The Concorde Collages, 2006 ISBN 978-2-915359206
- Hsia-Fei Chang, 32 portraits, Place du Tertre, Montmartre, 2006 ISBN 9782915359152
- Henrik Samuelsson : 4 paintings, north east south west, 2007 ISBN 978-2-915359-25-1

== Honours ==
Appointed as a Knight in the Order of Arts and Letters (Chevalier des Arts et des Lettres) in October 2010
