= Ari Benjamin Meyers =

American artist and composer (born 1972)

Ari Benjamin Meyers (born 1972 in New York) is an American artist and composer.

Meyers received his training as a composer and conductor at the Juilliard School, Yale University, and Peabody Institute. His practice includes creating musical performances for the stage and exhibition spaces. He has collaborated with artists including Tino Sehgal and Dominique Gonzalez-Foerster (for Performa 09); bands such as Einstürzende Neubauten and Chicks on Speed; and classical ensembles including the Bavarian Radio Symphony Orchestra and the Hong Kong New Music Ensemble.
