= Hsia-Fei Chang =

Taiwanese artist

- Born: 1973 (age 52–53); Taipei, Taiwan
- Other names: Hsia FeiChang
- Education: École des Beaux-Arts in Bordeaux
- Known for: Performance, installation, sculpture, photography
- Website: www.hsia-fei.com

Hsia-Fei Chang (born 1973 in Taipei) is a Taiwanese artist. She currently lives and works in Paris.

== Work ==
Chang's practice includes performance, installation, photography and text, and focuses mainly on identity and stereotypes. She has exhibited internationally in museums and biennials such as The Casino Luxembourg, La Maison Rouge, the Palais de Tokyo, the Fondation d'entreprise Pernod Ricard, the Brooklyn Museum of Art, the Taipei Biennial, the Tirana Biennial, the Something Else OFF Biennial Cairo.

== Collections ==
Her work is present in the permanent collections of the Fonds régional d'art contemporain Occitanie Montpellier and the Centre national des arts plastiques among others.

== Bibliography ==
- Hsia-Fei Chang, La biographie de Sandra, Paris: Onestar Press, 2004
- Hsia-Fei Chang, 32 portraits: Place Du Tertre, Montmartre, Paris: Onestar Press; Paris: Galerie Laurent Godin, 2006. ISBN 978-2915359152
- Sofia Eliza Bouratsis, Mehdi Brit, Enrico Lunghi, Hsia-Fei Chang: goodbye, Marseille: Editions P, 2015. ISBN 978-2917768495
