= Françoise Pétrovitch =

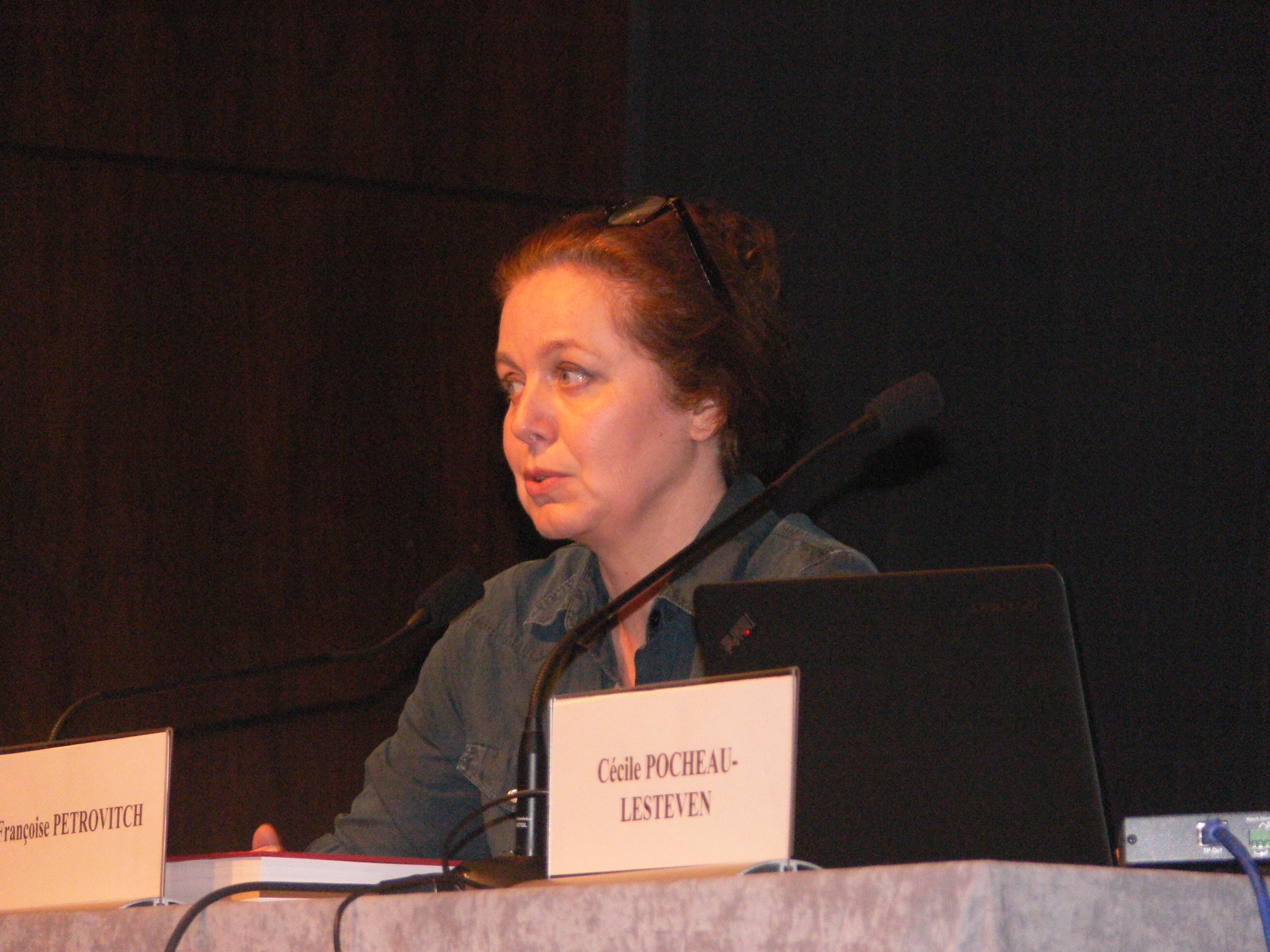
- Françoise Pétrovitch in October 2013
- Born: May 27, 1964 (age 62); Chambéry, France
- Occupations: Painter, printmaker, sculptor, jewelry designer
- Awards: Chevalier of the Legion of Honour (2022)
- Website: francoisepetrovitch.com

Françoise Pétrovitch is a French visual artist born in 1964 in Chambéry. She works with drawing and painting, as well as ceramics and video art.

== Career ==
She is known for her exploration of intimacy and adolescence through drawing and painting. Her works often depict figures—especially children and teenagers—in ink wash or oil on varying formats.

Recurring motifs in her work include anthropomorphic animals and a symbolic bestiary. Many of these figures, crafted in ceramic, are depicted either as disembodied heads (e.g., Fawn, 2004; Stag, 2004), seated figures (e.g., Witness Rabbit, 2013, 2015; The Sentinel, 2015), or partial forms (e.g., Half-Mammoth, 2014).

The bird is another recurring symbol, sometimes depicted lying in a hand or resting on its back. Her series Étendus features human and avian figures in sleeping positions, creating ambiguous, dreamlike imagery.

Her practice often evokes a liminal state between reality and imagination, avoiding linear narrative and instead presenting enigmatic, open-ended scenes.

In addition to visual art, Pétrovitch has worked extensively in publishing. She has authored and illustrated multiple artist books, including Ne bouge pas poupée (with Hervé Plumet) and Radio-Pétrovitch, as well as children’s publications such as Tu t’appelles qui ? and the coloring book Color Me.

She has exhibited widely in France and internationally. In 2008, her work was the subject of a solo exhibition at the Musée d'art moderne et contemporain de Saint-Étienne, followed by a presentation at the Musée de la Chasse et de la Nature in Paris (2011). Further solo shows have taken place at the Musée des beaux-arts de Chambéry (2014) and the LAAC in Dunkirk (2015).

In 2013, she completed a public commission for the Chalcography of the Louvre, producing the etching and aquatint Garçon à la bouée (Boy with Buoy).

In 2015, Pétrovitch was selected to represent France in the group exhibition Organic Matters: Women to Watch at the National Museum of Women in the Arts in Washington, D.C.. In 2016, her work was featured in several solo exhibitions, including at FRAC Provence-Alpes-Côte d’Azur, the Château de Tarascon, and the Espace pour l’Art in Arles.

Her work is held in numerous public collections, including the MNAM–Centre Pompidou, the MAC/VAL, the Musée d'art moderne et contemporain de Saint-Étienne, the National Museum of Women in the Arts, the Leepa-Rattner Museum of Art (Florida), and the regional contemporary art funds FRAC Haute-Normandie and FRAC Alsace.

Pétrovitch teaches at the École Estienne in Paris and is represented by the Semiose Gallery. Her works also feature in private collections, including the Salomon Foundation and the Guerlain Foundation.
