= Musée d'Art Contemporain du Val-de-Marne =

Art museum in Vitry-sur-Seine, France

Coordinates: 48°47′34″N 2°23′14″E

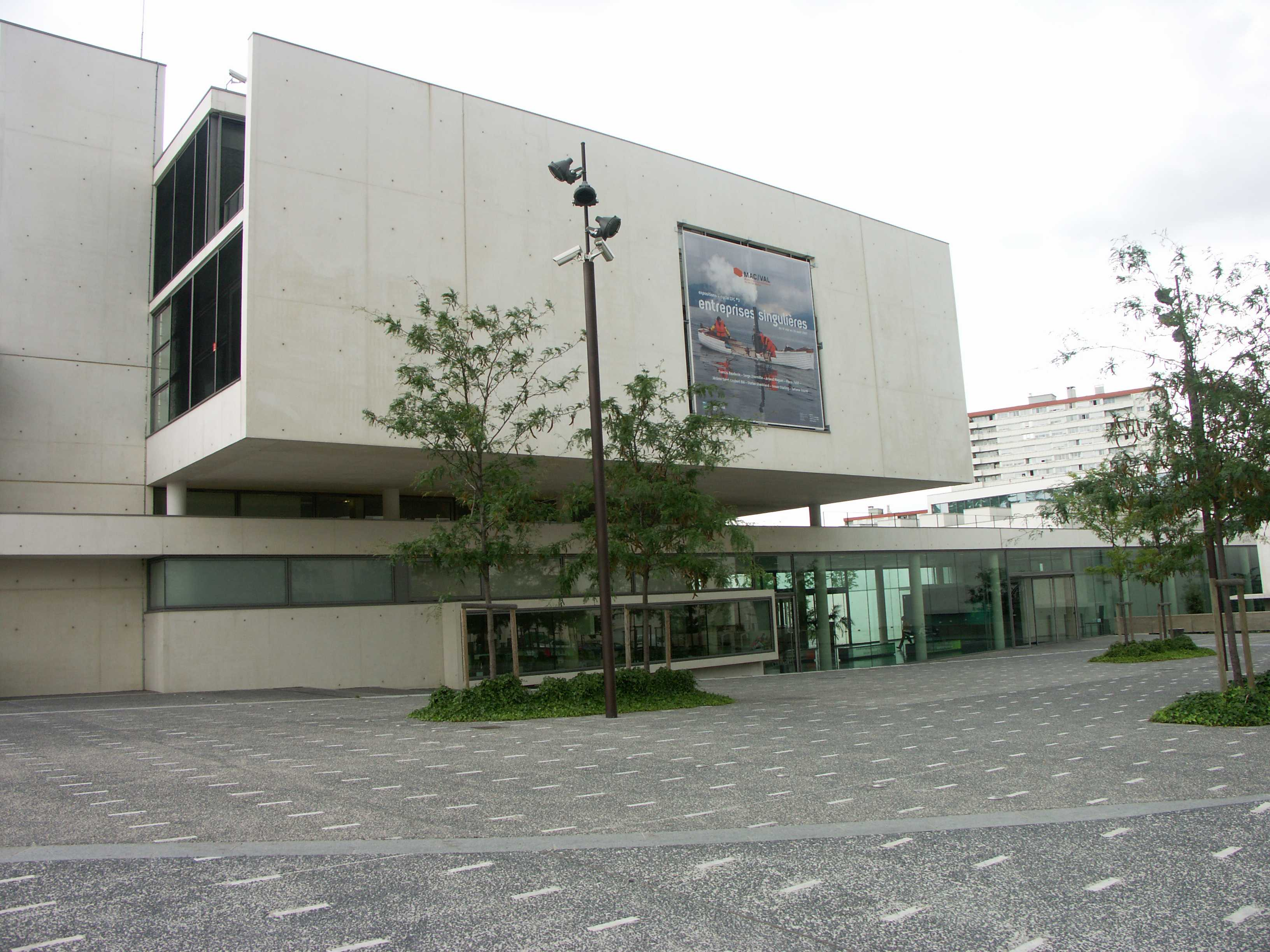
Vitry - Musee d'art contemporain 00

The Musée d'Art Contemporain du Val-de-Marne, nicknamed MAC/VAL, is a museum of contemporary art located in the Place de la Libération in Vitry-sur-Seine, Val-de-Marne, a suburb of Paris, France. It is open daily except Mondays; an admission fee is charged.

The museum opened in 2005, and is dedicated to works of art from the 1950s to the present. Its building, designed by architect Jacques Ripault, encompasses a total of 13,000 m² floor space (including 2600 m² for permanent exhibitions, 1350 m² for temporary shows, 480 m² for its research center, and 700 m² for storerooms and workshops). It also contains an auditorium and cinema of 150 seats, and is set within 10,000 m² of public garden.

Today the museum contains over a thousand works of artists active in France, including Martine Aballéa, Arman, Valérie Belin, Daniel Buren, Claude Closky, Delphine Coindet, Eugène Dodeigne, Erró, Hans Hartung, Pierre Huyghe, Véronique Joumard, Valérie Jouve, Bertrand Lamarche, Julio Le Parc, Annette Messager, François Morellet, Marylène Negro, Orlan, Bruno Perramant, Dominique Petitgand, Françoise Pétrovitch, Philippe Ramette, Judit Reigl, Pierre Soulages, Jean Tinguely, and Jean-Luc Vilmouth.

== See also ==
- List of museums in Paris

== Other references ==
- ParisInfo description
- Paris, Petit Futé, 2007, page 132. ISBN 2-7469-1701-7.
