= Philippe Parreno =

French artist (born 1964)

- Born: 1964 (age 61–62); Oran, Algeria
- Education: Institut des hautes études en arts plastiques, Palais de Tokyo, Paris (1988–1989) École des Beaux-Arts, Grenoble (1983–1988)

Philippe Parreno (born 1964) is a French contemporary artist, living and working in Paris. His works include films, installations, performances, drawings, and text.

Parreno's work centers around both expanding ideas of time and duration through his artworks and distinctive conception of exhibitions as a medium. He began examining unique approaches to both narration and representation in the 1990s, and has been exhibiting internationally since.

== Early life and education ==
Parreno was born in 1964 in Oran, then French Algeria, and grew up in Grenoble, in France. From 1983 to 1988, he studied at the École des Beaux-Arts in Grenoble and at the Institut des hautes études en arts plastiques at the Palais de Tokyo, Paris from 1988 to 1989.

== Work ==
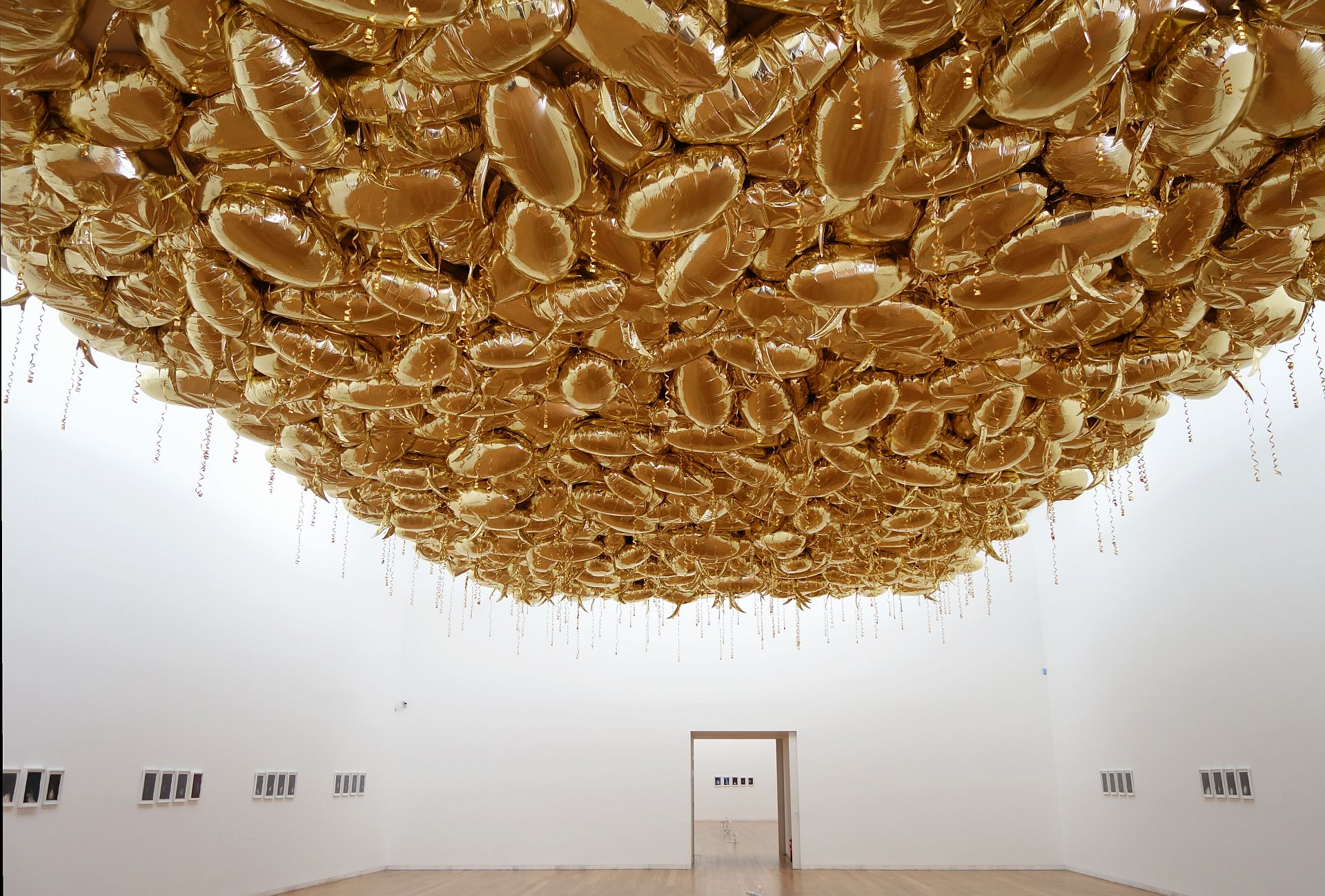
Philippe Parreno at Serralves Museum of Contemporary Art, Porto.

Parreno has exhibited his works since the early 1990s, while also working collaboratively with other artists in various media throughout his career.

Exhibitions and exhibition-making has been a central aspect in his work. For the artist, the exhibition is not a single work of art but a medium that offers endless possibility. Therefore, his exhibitions are mostly site-specific, as Parreno discloses in an interview for ArtReview: "What I generally do is so specific to the place that will hold the exhibition. I don't 'travel' shows. I find it impossible".

The press release from his 2009 show at Kunsthalle Zürich notes that apart from his extended concept of exhibitions, "an outstanding feature of Parreno's work is the transformation of genres, in particular film, into visual art".

=== Collaboration ===
Collaboration is integral to Parreno's work. In June 2006, Universal released a feature-length documentary directed by Parreno and Scottish artist Douglas Gordon entitled Zidane: A 21st Century Portrait, which premiered out of competition at the 2006 Cannes Film Festival. Using 17 cameras, this unique football film follows legendary French midfielder Zinedine Zidane throughout an entire Real Madrid vs Villarreal match in front of 80,000 fans at the Santiago Bernabéu Stadium. Two of the cameras were borrowed from the U.S. army and have the largest zoom available. The film tracks Zidane's every move on and off the ball, in the thick of the action. Subtitles includes the player's thoughts and observations on his playing career. The motion unfolds in a flow accentuated by an emotive original score by Scottish rock band, Mogwai.

In 2007 Parreno directed and co-curated with Hans Ulrich Obrist, a group exhibition, Il Tempo del Postino (Postman Time) for the Manchester International Festival, which then showed at Art Basel, 2009. More than fifteen artists collaborated in this project, including Doug Aitken, Matthew Barney & Jonathan Bepler, Tacita Dean, Trisha Donnelly, Olafur Eliasson, Liam Gillick, Dominique Gonzalez-Foerster, Douglas Gordon, Carsten Höller, Pierre Huyghe, Koo Jeong-A, Philippe Parreno, Anri Sala, Tino Sehgal, Rirkrit Tiravanija, Thomas Demand, and Peter Fischli / David Weiss.

In 2012 Parreno collaborated with artist Liam Gillick on To the Moon via the Beach. Shown at The Amphitheatre in Arles, this was a piece concerning work, production, and change, with the title reflecting its shifting nature and the promise of a journey. On entering the exhibition, visitors encountered an area covered in tons of sand. Over four days, this "beach" area was transformed by sand sculptors into a moonscape, which formed a constantly changing backdrop to a series of 22 artists' projects. The whole process was made visible with equal importance placed upon the production, presentation, and exchange of ideas.

In 2014 Parreno was involved in a unique collaboration with a number of artists and curators, including Tino Sehgal, Liam Gillick, Hans-Ulrich Obrist, Asad Raza, and Pierre Boulez, for which he was also a curator. The exhibition Solaris Chronicles at the LUMA Foundation Arles Campus was presented in two phases and examined, through a series of artistic interventions and projects, the creative vision of architect Frank Gehry. Centred on large-scale models of many of Gehry's seminal works, the constantly shifting mise-en-scène created by the artists formed a bridge between art and architecture, transforming the usual relationship and collaborative processes between the two practices.

In 2019, Parreno, Arca and Nicolas Becker used a generative music technology called Bronze to create a new work which will occupy the lobby of MoMA in New York for two years. 'Echo' is a site-specific work involving sound, light and animated physical objects. Described by the artist as an auto-poetic system, the work will exist in the space, responding to itself and its surroundings endlessly.

== Notable exhibitions and works ==
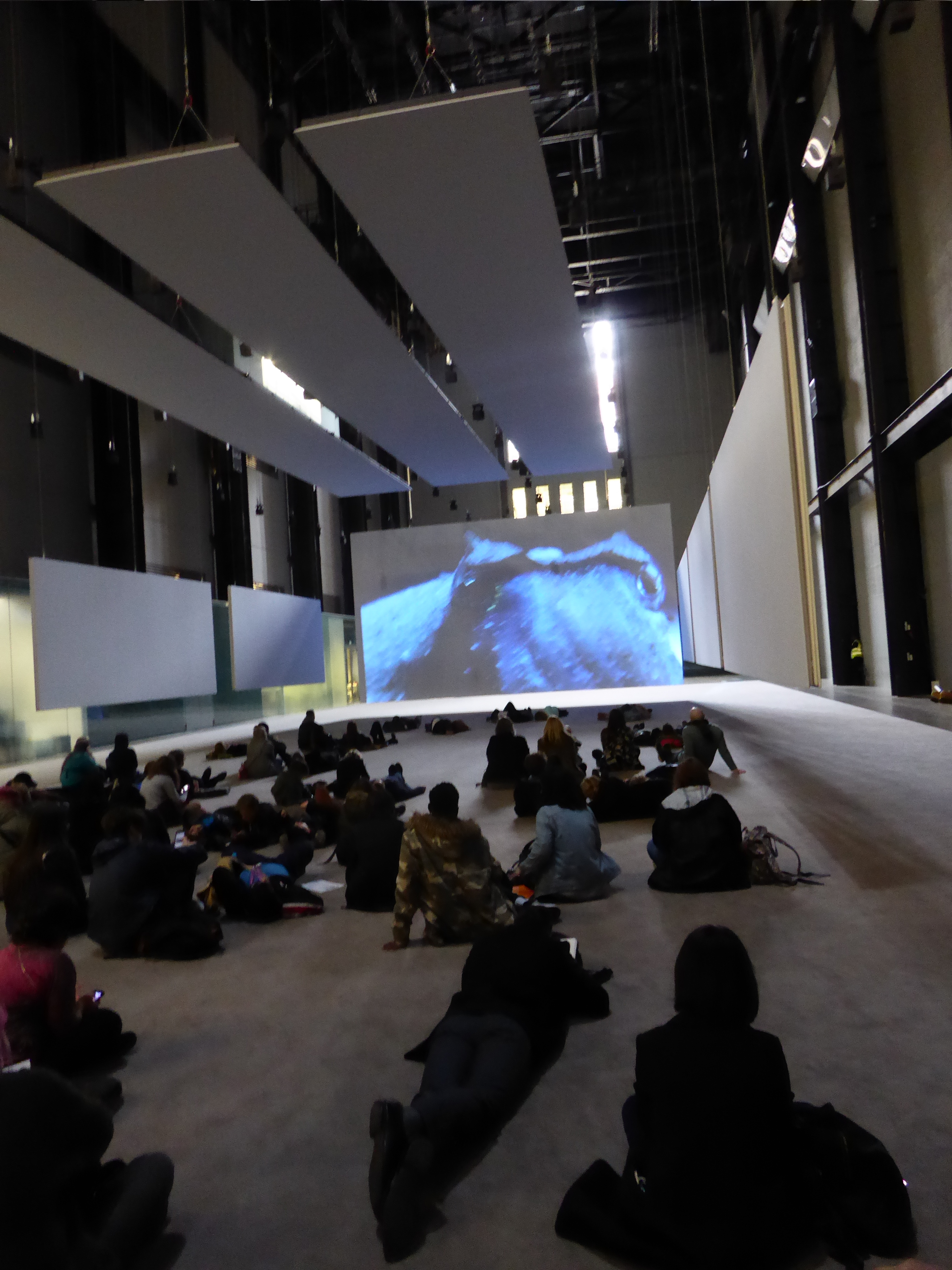
Anywhen. At Turbine Hall, Tate Modern, London 2016.

Parreno has used his specific conception of exhibitions in his 2013 exhibition Anywhere, Anywhere Out Of The World where he radically transformed the monumental space of the Palais de Tokyo in Paris. Parreno turned the building itself into a living constantly evolving organism using sound, image and performance to guide the visitor on a journey through his works, both old and new. The exhibition was orchestrated along the lines of a dramatic composition where the spectral presence of objects, music, lights, and films guide and manipulated the visitor's experience transforming this monologue into a polyphony.

In Dancing around the Bride in 2012 at the Philadelphia Museum of Art curated by Carlos Basualdo in collaboration with Erica F. Battle, Parreno acted as a metteur-en-scène (orchestrator), using the artworks of John Cage, Merce Cunningham, Jasper Johns, Robert Rauschenberg, and Marcel Duchamp to invoke time and motion.

Sound was a key element in the 2013 exhibition, The Bride and The Bachelors, at the Barbican, London. The varied sequence of Parreno's subtle orchestration of live and pre-recorded sound from the works of Cage, Cunningham, Johns, Rauschenberg and Duchamp was arranged in concert with live dance performances, enabling the exhibition to change over time.

During Art Basel, 2012, Parreno presented two major new works at Fondation Beyeler – Marilyn (2012) and C.H.Z. (Continuously Habitable Zones) (2011). Marilyn was subsequently shown at Parreno's first solo exhibition in Russia at the Garage Center for Contemporary Culture, Moscow and at the 55th Venice Biennale at François Pinault's museum, Palazzo Grassi.

H {N)Y P N(Y} OSIS, Parreno's first major U.S. exhibition, ran from June until August 2015 within the monumental interior of Park Avenue Armory's Wade Thompson Drill Hall, New York and transformed the traditional exhibition experience through an interplay of film, sculpture, and the spectral presence of sound and light. Shortly after, in October 2015 until February 2016, Parreno presented Hypothesis, at HangarBicocca in Milan, his first survey exhibition in Italy. The show, curated by Andrea Lissoni, was inhabited by a series of key pieces together with recent works and music according to a mise en scène devised by Parreno.

In October 2016 [until April 2017] Parreno undertook the Hyundai Commission for the Turbine Hall at London's Tate Modern. Entitled Anywhen, it was the second annual Hyundai Commission, a series of site-specific works created for the Turbine Hall by known international artists.

In 2017 from 2 February – 7 May, Parreno exhibited A Time Coloured Space at the Serralves Museum of Contemporary Art in Porto. Taking over the entire museum, it featured some of Parreno's most well-known works, along with new works.

In 2022 Parreno exhibited La Quinta del Sordo (2021) at Museo del Prado in Madrid, next to the room that houses Francisco Goya's 'Black Paintings'. The forty-minute audiovisual work uses advanced technology to recreate the ambience of Goya's house, known as the Quinta del Sordo, based on a 3D computer model Parreno created of the architecture.

In 2024, Parreno was appointed artistic director of the Okayama Art Summit 2025, a large international contemporary art exhibition held every three years in the Japanese city of Okayama.

=== Selected key works ===
- Anywhen (film), 2016
- Li Yan (film), 2016
- The Crowd (film), 2015
- Zidane, a 21st century portrait (2006), in collaboration with artist Douglas Gordon

== Collections ==
His work is included in the collections of many institutions such as the Centre Georges Pompidou, France; 21st Century Museum of Contemporary Art, Kanazawa, Japan; the Museum of Modern Art (MoMA), New York; the Walker Art Center (USA); Musée d'Art Moderne de la Ville de Paris, France; the San Francisco Museum of Modern Art, USA; the Guggenheim Museum New York, USA; Tate Modern, London, and the Pérez Art Museum Miami, Florida.

== Selected solo exhibitions ==
2024

Philippe Parreno: Voices, Haus der Kunst, Munich, Germany.

Philippe Parreno: Places and Spaces, Pola Museum of Art in Hakone, Japan.

VOICES, Leeum Museum of Art, Seoul, South Korea.

2022

Philippe Parreno: La Quinta del Sordo, Museo Nacional del Prado, Madrid, Spain.

2018

Philippe Parreno: La levadura y el anfitrión (The Yeast and The Host), Museo Jumex, Mexico City.

2017

Philippe Parreno: Synchronicity, Rockbund Art Museum, Shanghai.

Philippe Parreno: A Time Coloured Space, Serralves Museum of Contemporary Art, Porto, Portugal.

2016

Philippe Parreno: Thenabouts, ACMI (Australian Centre for the Moving Image), Melbourne, Australia.

Philippe Parreno: Anywhen, the 2016 Hyundai Commission for the Turbine Hall, Tate Modern, London.

2015

Hypothesis, HangarBicocca, Milan, Italy.

H {N} Y P N {Y} OSIS, Park Avenue Armory, New York, USA.

2013

Anywhere, Anywhere Out of the World, Palais de Tokyo, Paris, France.

Philippe Parreno, curated by Hans Ulrich Obrist, The Garage Center for Contemporary Culture, Moscow, Russia.

2012

Philippe Parreno, Fondation Beyeler, Basel, Switzerland.

2010

Philippe Parreno, Serpentine Gallery, London, UK.

Philippe Parreno, CCS Bard, Bard College, Annandale-on-Hudson, USA.

From 5 November Until They Fall Down, Castello di Rivoli, Torino, Italy.

2009

November, Irish Museum of Modern Art, Dublin, Ireland.

May, Kunsthalle Zürich, Zürich, Switzerland.

8 Juin 1968, Centre Pompidou - Musée National d'Art Moderne, Paris, France.
