= Éric Duyckaerts =

Belgian artist (1953–2019)

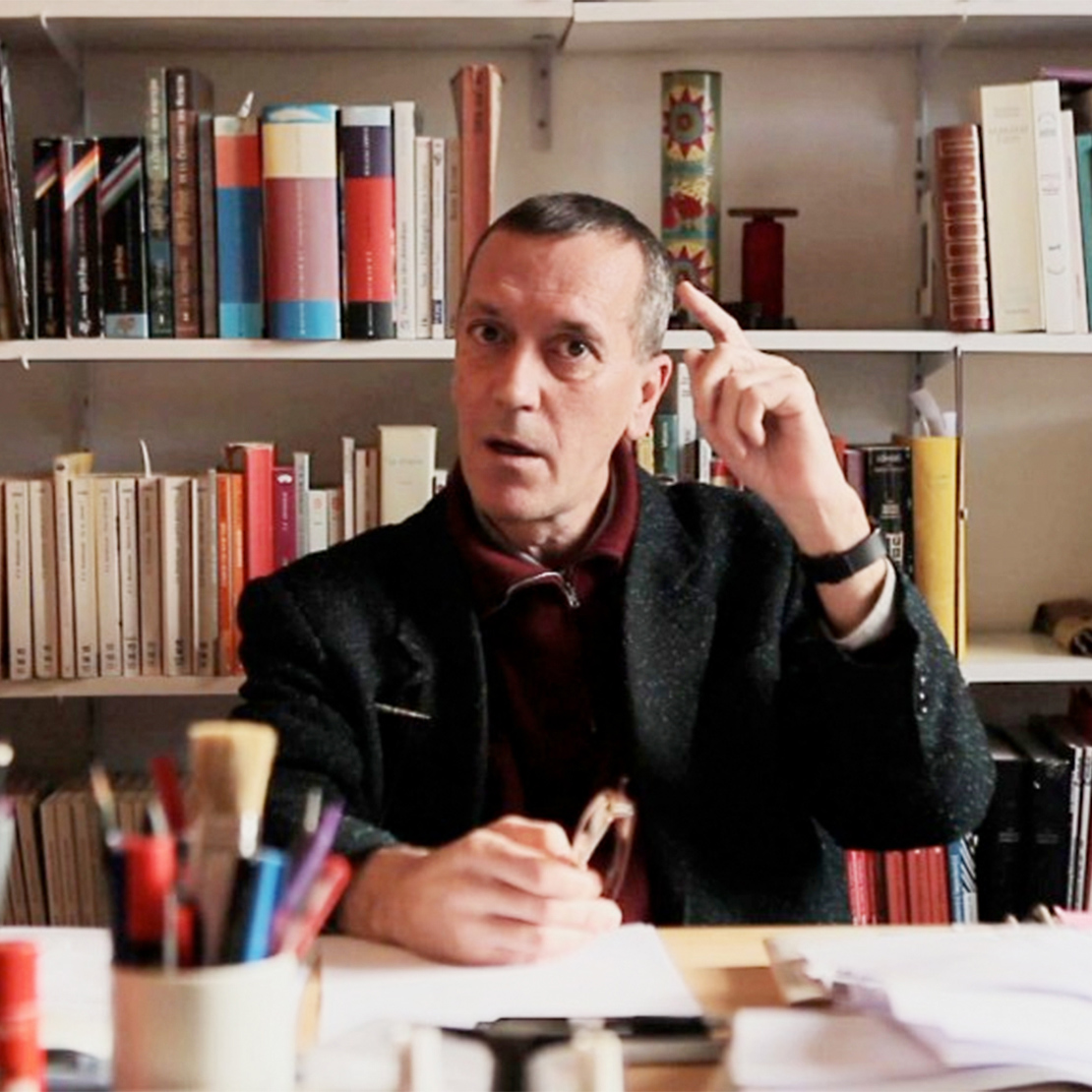
- Born: 4 February 1953; Liège, Belgium
- Died: 25 January 2019 (aged 65)
- Occupation: Artist

Éric Duyckaerts (4 February 1953 – 26 January 2019) was a Belgian artist, specializing in pastels and videography. His practice also includes installations.

His work articulates the plastic arts and exogenous knowledge, such as science, law and mathematical logic.

== Biography ==
After studying law and philosophy, Duyckaerts followed a career in art by enrolling in the Institut des Hautes Études en Arts Plastiques in Paris. He taught art in schools such as the École nationale supérieure d'art de Bourges, École nationale supérieure d'art de Dijon, École supérieure d'Art Pays Basque, the Villa Arson, and the École nationale supérieure d'arts de Paris-Cergy. He co-founded Groupov in 1980 with Michel Delamarre, Jacques Delcuvellerie, Monique Ghysens, Francine Landrain, Jany Pimpaud, and François Sikivie. Since the mid-1980s, Duyckaerts had been working on performances and videos mixed with audio installations.

Éric Duyckaerts died on 25 January 2019.
