= André Raffray =

French graphic artist

André Raffray (18 July 1925 – 6 January 2010) was a French graphic artist.

== Biography ==
Raffray was born on 18 July 1925 at Nonancourt in Normandy. After studying under André Rigal, he earned a living by working from 1953 to 1982 in the entertainment department of Gaumont.

Much of Raffray's work, who was particularly influenced by Marcel Duchamp, consisted in "finishing", "starting over", and reinterpreting the works of artists, like Monet's, Picasso's, etc., that served as an inspiration to him.

Raffray died in Paris on 6 January 2010.
