= Musée de la Chasse et de la Nature =

Hunting museum in Paris, France

Coordinates: 48°51′40″N 2°21′31″E

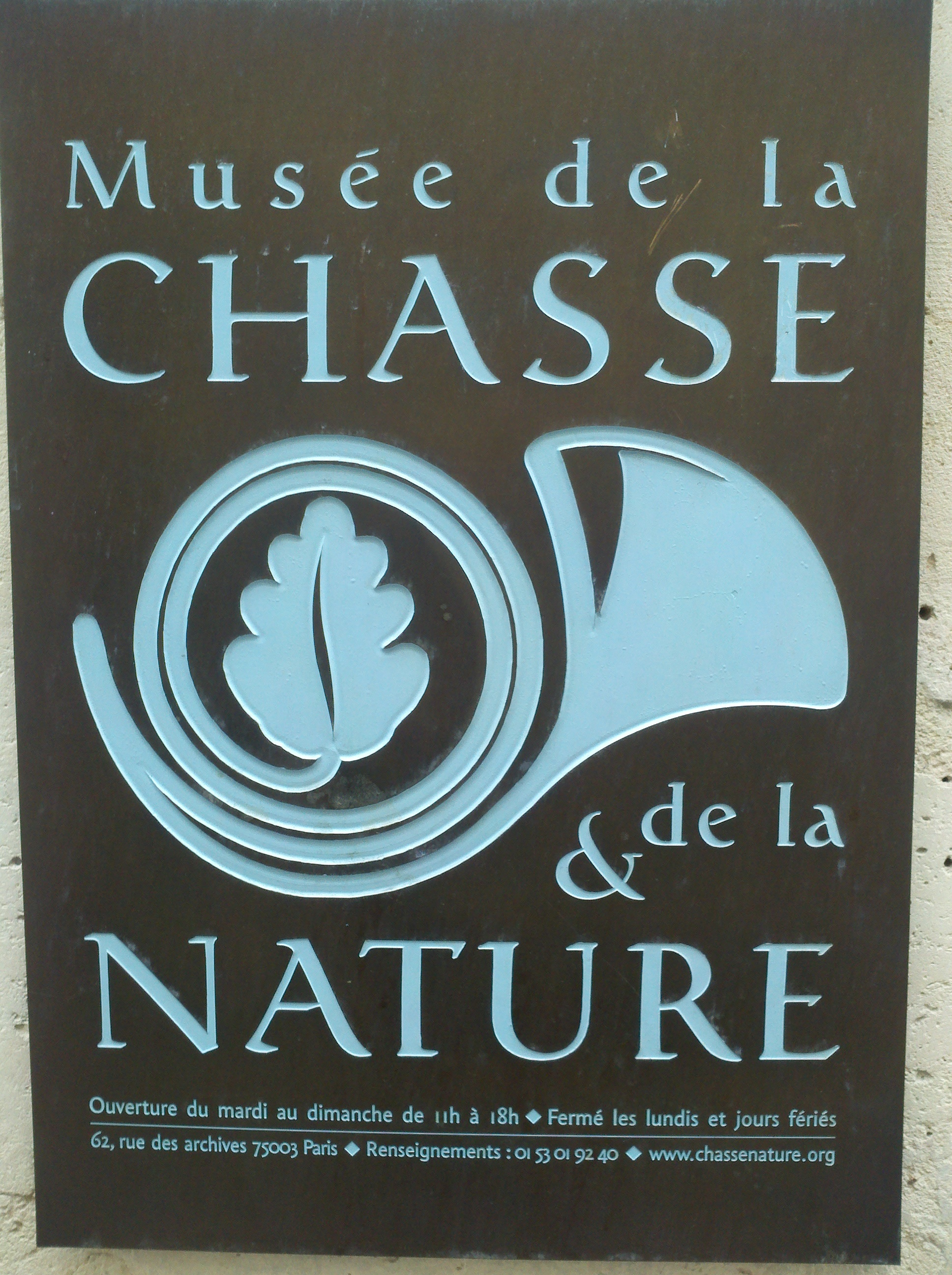
Signage at Musee de la Chasse et de la Nature

The Musée de la Chasse et de la Nature (French pronunciation: [myze də la ʃas e də la natyʁ], Museum of Hunting and Nature) is a private museum of hunting and nature located in the 3rd arrondissement of Paris, France. The museum is served by the Rambuteau Paris Métro station.

Exhibits focus on the relationships between humans and the natural environment through the traditions and practices of hunting. The museum has been characterized by the Smithsonian magazine as “one of the most rewarding and inventive in Paris", and is described in tourist guidebooks and other media as "quirky, astonishing, strange and eclectic".

== Origins ==
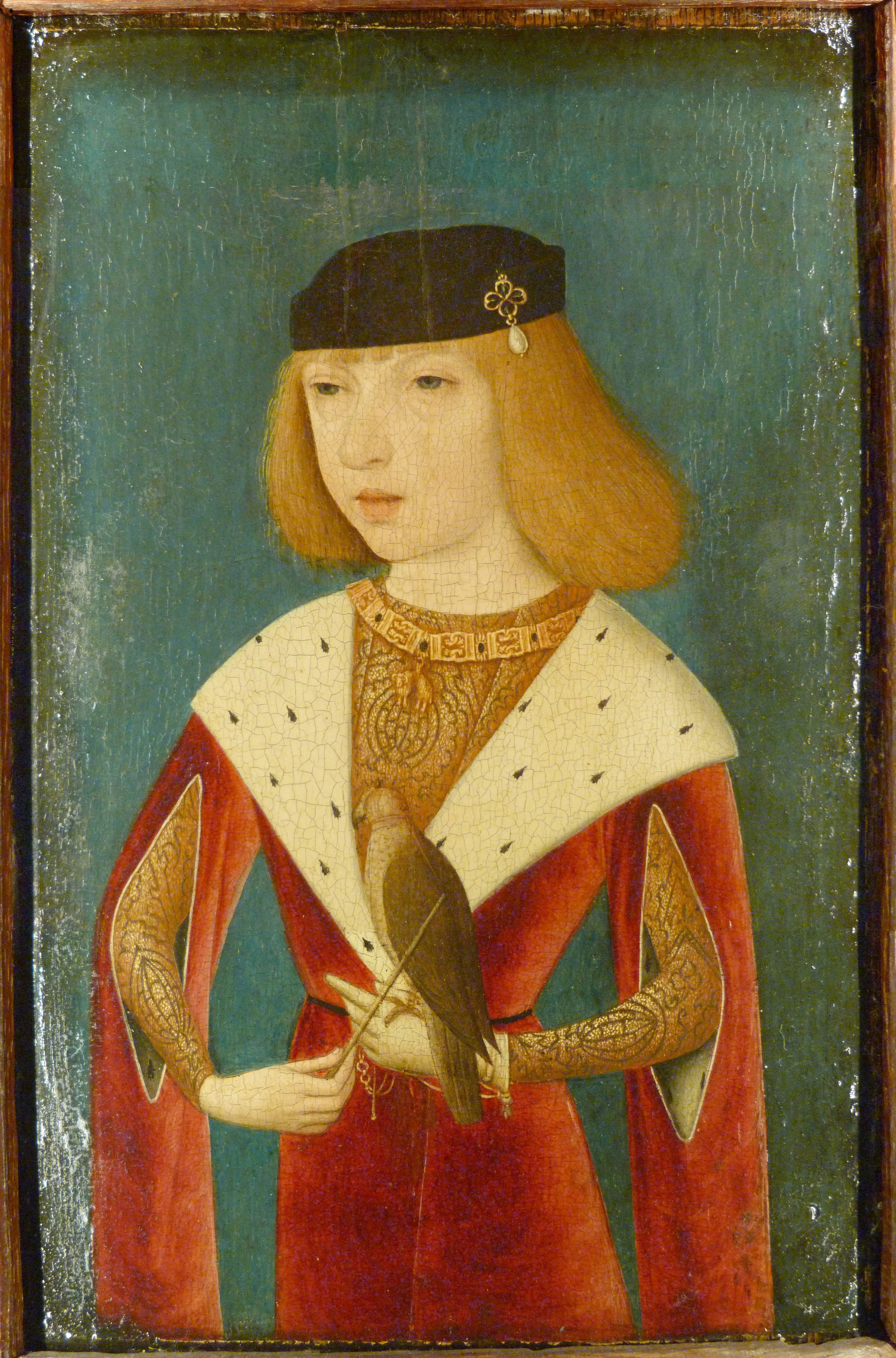
Philip the Handsome (1478-1506), Duke of Burgundy, holding a hooded falcon, displayed in the Falconry Room

The museum was founded in 1964 by wealthy French industrialist rugmaker François Sommer (1904-1973) and his wife Jacqueline, who were avid hunters and conservationists. It is operated by the Fondation de la Maison de la Chasse et de la Nature, which the couple also founded. The museum is housed within the Hôtel de Guénégaud (1651-1655), the only private mansion designed by architect François Mansart that still exists. Since 2002, it is also housed in the Hôtel de Mongelas (1703), as well. It opened in 1967 and was thoroughly renovated in 2007.

== Overview ==
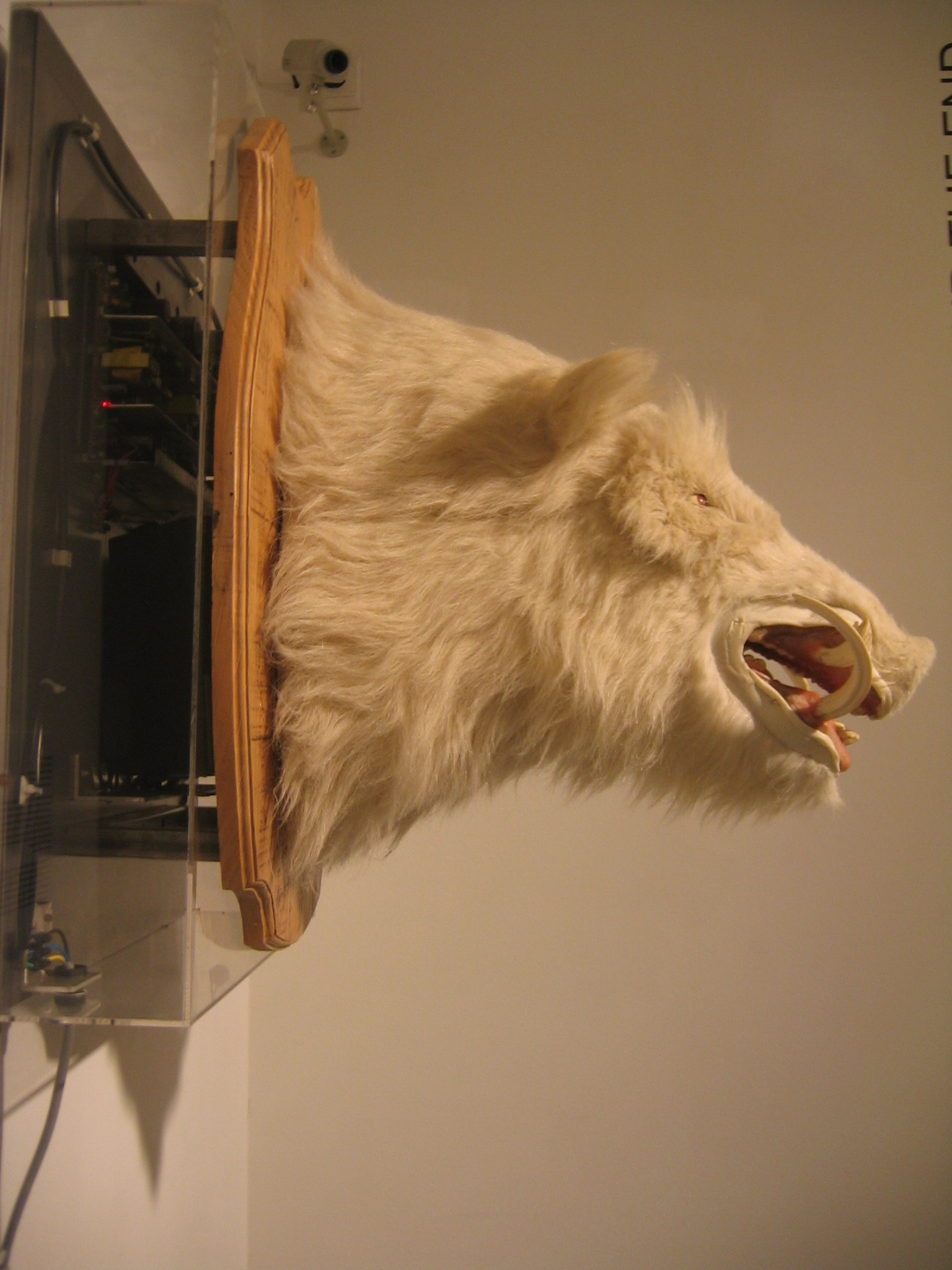
Le Souillot, the talking boar head displayed in the Trophy Room

The museum, housed in the limestone Hôtel de Guénégaud under a 99-year lease, is made up of multiple rooms paneled in wood and outfitted with bronze decorative fixtures designed by Brazilian sculptor Saint Clair Cemin, and made to look like vines, antlers and tree branches. The ceiling of one room has been covered in owl feathers in a work called The Night of Diana by contemporary Belgian artist Jan Fabre. The museum's rooms have names such as Room of the Boar, Salon of the Dogs and Cabinet of the Wolf.

The museum's chief curator is Claude d'Anthenaise.

The collection is partly made up of objects and works that were gathered personally by François and Jacqueline Sommer: their collection totalled nearly three thousand hunting-related objects, including nearly five hundred engravings.

The museum displays ancient and contemporary works together: in the Salon of the Dogs, a collection of gold dog collars throughout the ages is displayed alongside 17th-century portraits of Louis XIV's pets and a small white version of the Scottie dog sculpture Puppy by contemporary American ceramic artist Jeff Koons. It also includes fantastical elements: an alcove dedicated to unicorns contains a small curio cabinet, the 2005 video Unicorn by French video artist Maïder Fortune, work by contemporary artist Jean-Michel Othoniel, and a 1957 sculpture by Janine Janet.

== Collection ==
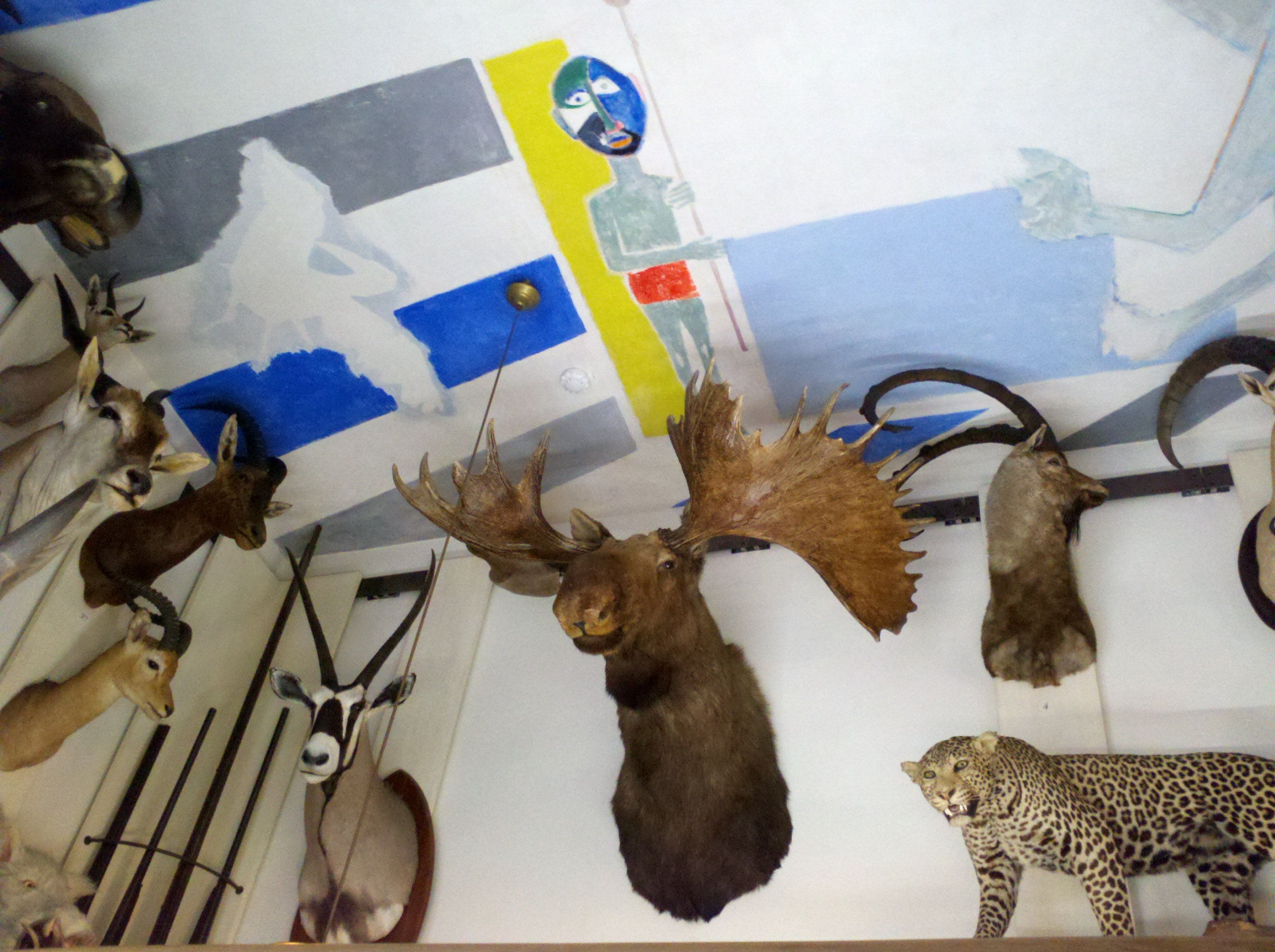
Salle des Trophées

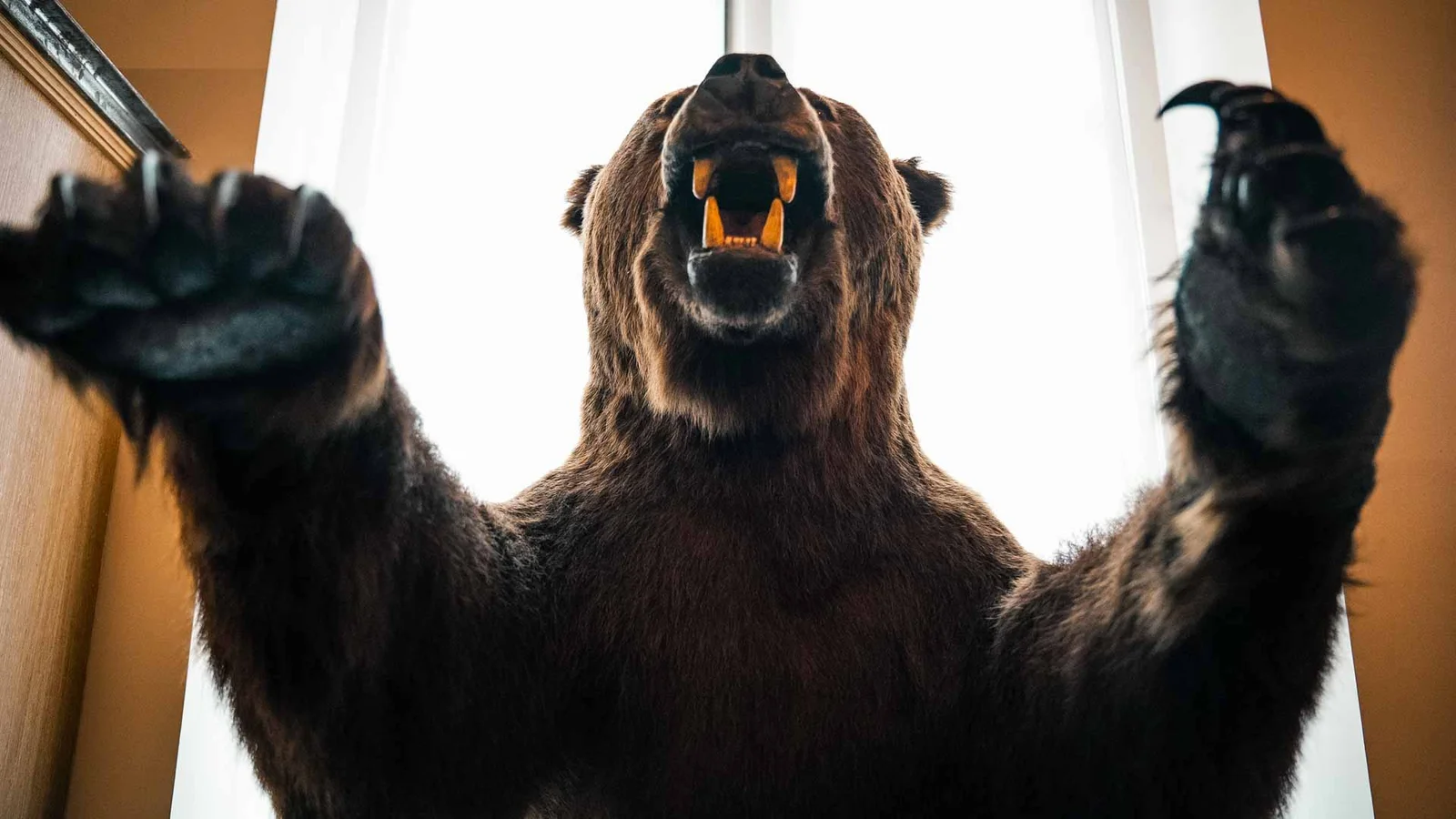
A taxidermied bear on display at the Museum of Hunting and Nature in Paris

The museum is organized around three themes: weapons and other instruments of hunting such as guns and horns; hunting products such as trophies and taxidermied animals; and artistic representations of wildlife and hunting such as paintings, prints, sculptures, tapestries, ceramics and furniture.

- Weapons and hunting accessories

The museum includes an array of weaponry from the 16th through to the 19th centuries, including spears, cross bows, hunting horns, powder flasks and guns. Guns include ones owned by Louis XIII, Marie-Thérèse of Austria, Napoleon Ier, and Napoleon III.

- Hunting products

The museum houses hundreds of trophies and taxidermied animals from Europe, Africa, Asia and America. These include a polar bear, lion, tiger, cheetah, fox, rhinoceros, bison, water buffalo and many birds. In the Room of Trophies, Le Souillot, a wall-mounted animatronic albino boar head by contemporary French artist Nicolas Darrot, speaks to museum visitors in French.

- Paintings and sculptures

The museum includes representations of hunting and nature scenes by historically significant artists such as Flemish Baroque painter Peter Paul Rubens, German Renaissance painter Lucas Cranach the Elder, 17th-century Flemish painter Frans Snyders, official 'painter of the hunt and animals' Alexandre-François Desportes and naturalistic French Rococo painter Jean-Baptiste Oudry, as well as contemporary artists such as Belgian multidisciplinary artist and sculptor Jan Fabre, French glass sculptor Jean-Michel Othoniel and contemporary French watercolour painter Françoise Pétrovitch.

== See also ==
- List of museums in Paris
