= Mary Brooksbank =

Scottish mill worker, socialist, trade unionist and songwriter

- Born: Mary Soutar; 15 December 1897; Aberdeen
- Died: 16 March 1978 (aged 80); Ninewells Hospital, Dundee
- Occupations: Mill worker, songwriter
- Known for: Socialist activism, trade unionism and songwriting

Mary Brooksbank (born Soutar; 15 December 1897 – 16 March 1978) was a Scottish mill worker, socialist, trade unionist and songwriter. She was an active member of the Communist Party of Great Britain between 1920 and 1933, and spent three periods in prison as a result of her agitation. She attended John Maclean's last meetings at the Scottish Labour College.

She is remembered today as a prominent figure in Dundee's labour movement. She founded the Working Women Guild to fight for better health and social services in Dundee, securing a membership of over 300, and was heavily involved in October 1934 with the National Unemployed Workers Movement county march to Forfar, to lobby the County Council; contingents were raised from Dundee, Blairgowrie, Montrose, Ferryden and Arbroath.

== Early life ==
Mary Brooksbank was born in an Aberdeen slum, the oldest of either five or ten children, and came to Dundee when she was eight or nine years old. She began working illegally in Dundee's jute mills as a bobbin shifter by the age of 12, and had her first experience of trade unionism at the age of 14, when the girls at her jute mill successfully marched for a 15% pay rise.

Mary's father, Sandy Soutar (who died in 1953, aged 86), was from St Vigeans, Arbroath, and had been an active trade unionist amongst the dock workers, working with James Connolly. Her mother, Rose Ann Soutar, née Gillan, was a fisher lassie and domestic servant. It is said that the Soutar family was "effectively blacklisted in Dundee because of their trade union activities".

== Political life ==
At 21, Brooksbank rejected Roman Catholicism, became an atheist and was inspired by John McLean to join the Communist Party to fight for women's rights, equality, and the demise of capitalism. She is quoted as saying:

“I have never had any personal ambitions. I have but one: to make my contribution to destroy the capitalist system.”

She was expelled from the Communist Party in 1933 as she was critical of Stalin, and became more sympathetic to Scottish nationalism. John Maclean, whose classes she attended in Glasgow, was a major proponent of an independent "Scottish workers' republic".

She continued to be politically active to the end of her life, in campaigning for better housing and for pensioners' rights.

== Music ==
Family sing-a-longs nurtured Brooksbank's love of music. She sang, played the violin and wrote songs. When money was low, she took the ferry from Dundee to Tayport and sang for money in the street. In the 1960s and 1970s she sang on radio and television.

Most of her songs were about the life of the working-class mill workers of Dundee, mostly women. She called these songs "Mill Songs". They were full of detail and sympathy for the struggle in which these hard-working, poorly paid women were engaged to feed and care for their families.

Her most famous song was "Jute Mill Song" or "Oh Dear Me".:

Jute Mill Song (Mary Brooksbank)

Oh dear me, the mill's gannin' fast
The puir wee shifters canna get a rest
Shiftin' bobbins coorse and fine
They fairly mak' ye work for your ten and nine

Oh dear me, I wish the day was done
Rinnin' up and doon the Pass it is nae fun
Shiftin', piecin', spinnin' warp weft and twine
Tae feed and clad my bairnie affen ten and nine

Oh dear me, the warld is ill divided
Them that works the hardest are the least provided
I maun bide contented, dark days or fine
For there's nae much pleasure livin' affen ten and nine
Repeat 1

You can hear it sung by Brookshanks and later folksingers at the Scots Language Centre: Scotslanguage.com - Work Songs.

Her original notebook of songs and poems is part of the Kinnear Collection held by the archives at the University of Dundee. The same institution also holds a collection of her papers. Ewan MacColl recorded some of her songs.

== Death ==
Brooksbank died at Ninewells Hospital in Dundee on 16 March 1978. A library in Dundee was named in her honour. When the library was closed, the Brooksbank Centre on Pitairlie Road was named after her. A verse from her Jute Mill Song is inscribed in Iona marble on the Scottish Parliament Building's Canongate Wall, which displays quotations from Scottish writers and poets.

== Commemoration ==
A rearrangement of the Jute Mill Song or Oh Dear Me was created by the American artists Brian House and Sue Huang of collaborative Knifeandfork for a performance installation at West Ward Works and Verdant Works in 2016 for the NEoN Digital Arts Festival.

In 2022, to mark the 125th anniversary of her birth, the Abertay Historical Society published a collection of essays celebrating her life and work.

In September 2023, Knights Theatre held a celebration event “Oh Dear Me: The Inspirational Mary Brooksbank” at Dundee Fringe and a creative writing workshop at Verdant Works Museum.
