= Blackness, Dundee =

Area of Dundee, Scotland

Coordinates: 56.459956°N 2.994693°W

Blackness: Scottish Gaelic: Nis Dubh
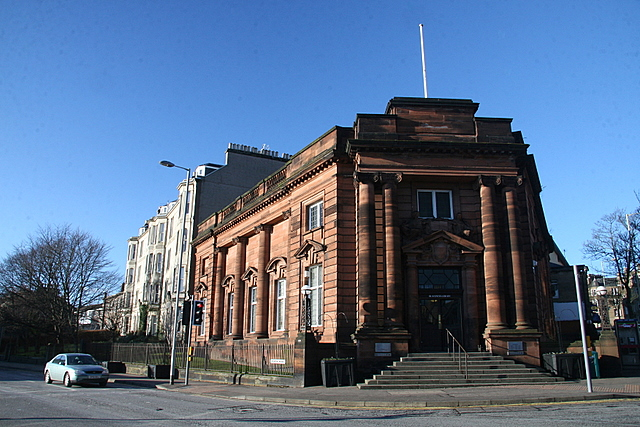
- Blackness Library

- Location within Dundee City council area Location within Scotland
- Population: 2,565
- OS grid reference: NO388302
- Council area: Dundee City
- Lieutenancy area: Dundee
- Country: Scotland
- Sovereign state: United Kingdom
- Post town: DUNDEE
- Postcode district: DD2
- Dialling code: 01382
- Police: Scotland
- Fire: Scottish
- Ambulance: Scottish
- UK Parliament: Dundee West
- Scottish Parliament: Dundee City West

Blackness (Scots pronunciation: [bɫɑkˈnɛs]) is an area of the city of Dundee. Broadly, Blackness is located to the north of the city's West End and is centred on the Blackness Road, where a number of small, local shops are located. The presence of the Scouring Burn (now diverted underground) meant that the area was attractive for industrial development in the late eighteenth and early nineteenth centuries, modern steam powered machinery requiring a substantial water supply. Part of Blackness is a conservation area, noted for its "industrial and social significance ... fine mills [and] narrow cobbled streets". The Verdant Works is in Blackness.

The Brooksbank Centre in Blackness commemorates Mary Brooksbank, local resident, revolutionary and songwriter.
