= Chris Henry =

Chris Henry may refer to:

- Chris Henry (wide receiver) (1983–2009), American football wide receiver
- Chris Henry (running back) (born 1985), American football running back
- Chris Henry (rugby union) (born 1984), Irish rugby union footballer
- Chris Henry (DJ), British DJ and producer
- Chris Henry (museum curator) (born 1962)
- Chris Henry Jr. (born 2007), American football wide receiver
