= Brian House =

American sound artist

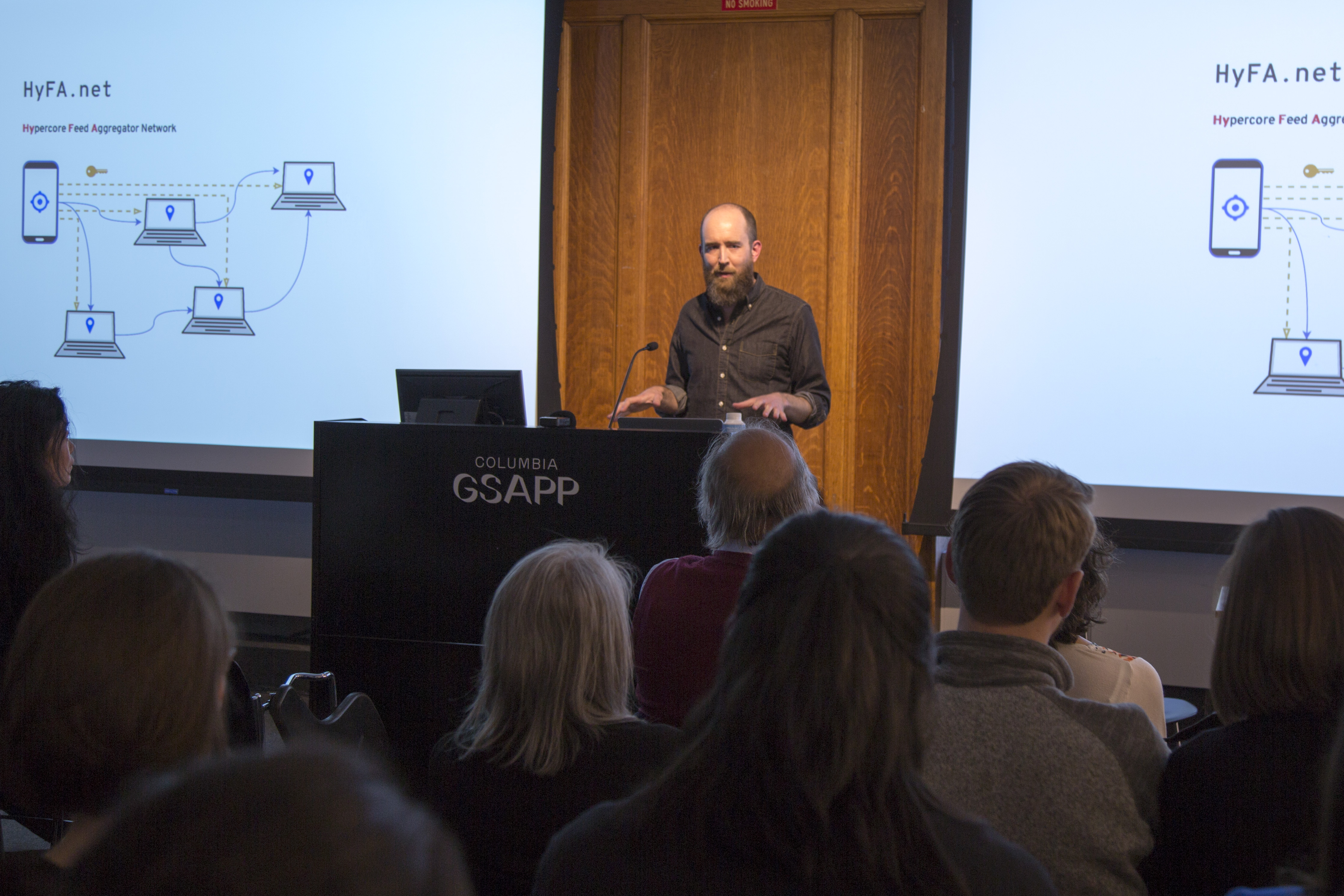
- Brian House speaking at Columbia University in 2019
- Born: Brian House; 1979 (age 46–47); Denver, Colorado
- Education: Columbia University (BA); Chalmers tekniska högskola (MS); Brown University (MA, Ph.D.)
- Known for: New media art, sound art
- Awards: Creative Capital Award (2023); MacDowell Fellowship (2026)
- Website: brianhouse.net

Brian House (born Denver, Colorado) is a new media artist known for projects that utilize sound and data sonification to explore the relationship between nature and technology. His early work also includes key examples of locative media art and the combination of new media with social practice. House has appeared in numerous exhibitions around the world, including at the Museum of Modern Art, the Museum of Contemporary Art, Los Angeles, Ars Electronica and ZKM Center for Art and Media.

== Biography ==
House graduated with a degree in computer science from Columbia University, where he studied at the Computer Music Center. He subsequently received a master's degree from Chalmers tekniska högskola in Gothenburg, Sweden, and was active in the local experimental music scene. House formed the Knifeandfork media art collective in 2004 with classmate Sue Huang and became a member of the psychogeography collective Glowlab on returning to New York City.

Knifeandfork received a 2007 Rhizome commission and were artists-in-residence at the Museum of Contemporary Art in Los Angeles in 2009. House was a resident of Eyebeam Art and Technology Center in 2012 and was concurrently a member of the Research and Development Lab at The New York Times. His work at the Times with personal data was featured in Time magazine.

House earned a PhD at Brown University in 2018, where he studied with Wendy Hui Kyong Chun. As of 2026 he is an assistant professor of art at Amherst College, and is represented by Gallery Nosco in London.

== Selected works ==
=== Everyday Infrasound in an Uncertain World (2025) ===
Everyday Infrasound in an Uncertain World is an album that House released on the German label Gruenrekorder on 7 November 2025. It comprises recordings of atmospheric infrasound, low-frequency sound below about 20 hertz that the human ear cannot detect. House captured the recordings over a 24-hour period near Amherst, Massachusetts, using devices he built and named "macrophones," whose design is based on the infrasound sensor arrays that the Preparatory Commission for the Comprehensive Nuclear-Test-Ban Treaty Organization uses to monitor for distant nuclear tests. He then sped the audio up by a factor of 60, compressing a full day into roughly 24 minutes and raising its pitch by about six octaves to bring it within the range of human hearing, and divided the result into a daytime track and a nighttime track. House has connected the work to climate change, noting that infrasound travels long distances from sources such as storms, ocean currents, wildfires, and receding glaciers. The recording is part of his larger project Macrophones, which received a Creative Capital award in 2023. It was named among Bandcamp Daily's best field recordings of 2025 and was reviewed and profiled in The Wire, Spin, MIT Technology Review, and The Washington Post. Reviewing it in The Wire, Julian Cowley described the album as "a notable document in terms of its conceptual and technological ingenuity."

=== Animas (2016) ===
Animas is a reaction to the 2015 Gold King Mine waste water spill, where three million gallons of contaminated wastewater was released into the Animas River. House made an installation which transforms real-time data from water quality sensors into vibrations that activate metal panels and create an immersive sound environment.

=== Conversnitch (2013) ===
House and Kyle McDonald converted light bulbs in public spaces into microphones that automatically tweeted overheard conversations.

=== Quotidian Record (2012) ===
Quotidian Record is a vinyl record of one year of House's location data translated into music. One rotation of the record is one day. It comments on the physicality of data and the inherent rhythms of everyday life.

=== Joyride (2011) ===
In 2011, House used OpenPaths and Google Street View to track the location of a stolen iPhone and create a re-enactment of the thief's journey.

=== Trying the Hand of God (2009) ===
In 2009, House and Huang (as Knifeandfork) were social practice artists-in-residence at MOCA in Los Angeles where they produced several projects. In Trying the Hand of God, they converted the sculpture plaza into a stadium with astroturf, goalposts and bleachers, and filmed 64 versions of Diego Maradona's famous "Hand of God" goal from the 1986 World Cup. Members of the audience played the role of Maradona.

=== Yellow Arrow (2004) ===
Yellow Arrow was a street art project using stickers and text-messaging that took place simultaneously in 35 countries. It is an important early example of locative media use and mobile phone art and draws concepts from psychogeography.

Yellow Arrow was included in the Design and the Elastic Mind show at MoMA curated by Paola Antonelli.
