= Klaus Biesenbach =

German-American curator and museum director

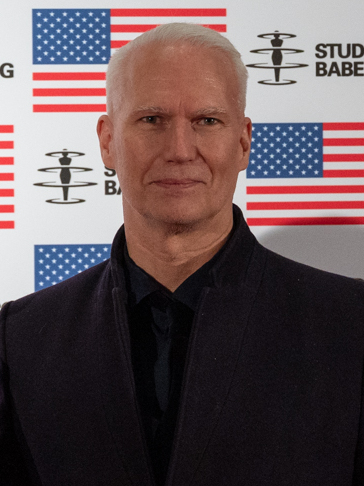
- Biesenbach in 2023
- Born: 1966 (age 59–60); Bergisch Gladbach, West Germany (now Germany)
- Occupations: Curator, museum director
- Employer: Neue Nationalgalerie

Klaus Biesenbach (born 1966) is a German-American curator and museum director. He is the Director of the Neue Nationalgalerie, with Berggruen Museum and Scharf-Gerstenberg Collection, as well as the berlin modern under construction.

Previously, Biesenbach had been serving as the director of The Museum of Contemporary Art, Los Angeles (MOCA), from 2018 to 2021. He is also a former Chief Curator at Large at The Museum of Modern Art in New York City and former director of MoMA PS1. He is also the founding director of Kunst-Werke Institute for Contemporary Art (KW) in Berlin, and the Berlin Biennale.

== Early life and education ==
Biesenbach was born in July 1966 in Bergisch Gladbach, West Germany and grew up in a rural setting in Kürten. After graduating from high school, he completed a year of alternative civilian service and volunteered at a kibbuz in Israel.

From 1987, Biesenbach began studying medicine in Munich, on a scholarship provided by the German Academic Scholarship Foundation. In the summer of 1989, he visited New York for the first time with the idea that he might transfer schools but instead completed an internship at Paper. He moved to Berlin in 1989.

== Career ==
=== Kunst-Werke Institute for Contemporary Art ===
Biesenbach founded Kunst-Werke Institute for Contemporary Art (KW) in Berlin in 1991, as well as the Berlin Biennale in 1996, and remains Founding Director of both entities. Under his artistic and executive directorship, KW and the Berlin Biennale were started as self-inventive initiatives and are now federally and state funded institutions.

=== MoMA, and MOMA PS1 ===
Biesenbach joined MoMA PS1 as a curator in 1996; the museum's director Alanna Heiss had hired him part-time while allowing him to maintain his directorship in Berlin. Working with Heiss, he created the "Warm Up" outdoor summer series of live music and helped found the "Greater New York" exhibition series, which showcases emerging talent in the metropolitan area. After P.S.1 merged with MoMA in 2000, Biesenbach became a liaison between the two.

In 2004, Biesenbach was appointed as a curator in the MoMA's "Department of Film and Media". He was named Chief Curator of MoMA's newly formed Department of Media, in 2006; it was the first new curatorial department since photography, in 1940. By 2009, it was subsequently broadened to the Department of Media and Performance Art to reflect the Museum's increased focus on collecting, preserving, and exhibiting performance art. As Chief Curator of the department, Biesenbach led a range of pioneering initiatives, including the launch of a new performance art exhibition series; an ongoing series of workshops for artists and curators; acquisitions of media and performance art; and the Museum's presentation in 2010 of a major retrospective of the work of Marina Abramović.

In 2012, Biesenbach turned MoMA P.S. 1 into a temporary day shelter for displaced residents after Hurricane Sandy. He drafted an open letter to the then New York City Mayor, Michael R. Bloomberg and fellow New Yorkers that called for help in the Rockaways, where he had purchased a house in early 2012, signed by celebrities including Lady Gaga, Madonna, James Franco, Gwyneth Paltrow and Patti Smith.

In addition to his role at MoMA, Biesenbach served as member of the International Jury at the Venice Biennale (1997) and as co-curator of the Berlin Biennale (1998) and Shanghai Biennale (2002).

=== MOCA ===
In 2018, Biesenbach was appointed director of the Museum of Contemporary Art, Los Angeles.

During his time as director, Biesenbach introduced free admission to the museum with a $10 million gift from Carolyn Clark Powers, founded the first Environmental Council at any American museum and started the Performance Space Wonmi's Warehouse Programs while commissioning Larry Bell's, Bill and Coo and Untitled by Barbara Kruger as public art projects.

As director, Biesenbach diversified the collection and exhibition program by supporting exhibitions with artists like Xu Zhen, Jennifer Packer, Pipilotti Rist, Henry Taylor, Tala Madani, Judy Baca, Annika Yi, Garrett Bradley, Cao Fei, and Simone Forti.

During the COVID-19 pandemic in the United States, Biesenbach pivoted the museum programs online to virtual MOCA where he conducted twenty-five studio visits with international artists that were distributed on the museum's website, social media, and YouTube. In addition, he fundraised with artists' designed facemasks by Yoko Ono, Catherine Opie, Pipilotti Rist, Mark Grotjahn, Barbara Kruger, Hank Willis Thomas, Virgil Abloh, Alex Israel and sold them internationally in collaboration with the Warhol Foundation, the Qatar Museums and the K11 Hongkong.

As part of a 2021 reorganization, Biesenbach was later named artistic director, with a mandate to focus on setting the artistic vision for the museum, overseeing exhibitions and collections. Shortly after, Johanna Burton was appointed as executive director.

=== Neue Nationalgalerie ===
In September 2021, Biesenbach was appointed as new director of both the Neue Nationalgalerie with Berggruen Museum and Scharf-Gerstenberg Collection and the future Museum of the 20th Century.

== Climate activism and anti-materialism ==
Biesenbach is a prominent figure in climate activism within the art world, particularly through his work at major institutions like MOCA in Los Angeles and the Neue Nationalgalerie in Berlin. Biesenbach co-initiated the Environmental Council at MOCA, marking it as the first sustainability-focused group within a U.S. art museum. His activism is rooted in integrating ecological and social issues into the fabric of museum programming, as seen in projects like the ecological festival EXPO 1 and post-Hurricane Sandy art initiatives. His approach underscores the vital role museums play in addressing pressing global challenges, including the climate crisis, by fostering spaces for public engagement and protest.

== Other activities ==
- American Academy in Berlin, Member of the Board of Trustees
- Berlin Biennale, Member of the Advisory Board
- KW Institute for Contemporary Art, Member of the Board

== Recognition ==
Biesenbach is the recipient of the following awards and honorary degrees:

- 2016 – Order of Merit of the Federal Republic of Germany
- 2018 – City of New York Proclamation of Honor for service to New York City
- 2021 – Honorary Doctor of Fine Arts, awarded by the New York Academy of Art

In addition, Biesenbach received the International Association of Art Critics (AICA) award for the exhibitions Marina Abramović: The Artist Is Present, Pipilotti Rist: Pour Your Body Out (7354 Cubic Meters), and Fassbinder: Berlin Alexanderplatz. He also received AICA awards for co-curating the exhibitions Kenneth Anger, 100 Years (version #2, ps1, Nov 2009), and Roth Time: A Dieter Roth Retrospective and 100 Years (version #2 PS1, Nov 2009) at MoMA PS1 and MoMA QNS, as well as Kenneth Anger (2009) at MoMA PS1 and 100 Years (version #2 PS1, Nov 2009) at MoMA PS1 and MoMA QNS, as well as Kenneth Anger (2009) at MoMA PS1.

== Personal life ==
Biesenbach lives in Berlin. He also owns land in Uckermark and Puerto Rico. He has in the past lived with his friend, the artist Andrea Zittel, with whom he shared an apartment at KW in the 1990s and stayed in Joshua Tree in 2020.

== Exhibitions ==
=== Exhibitions organized and co-organized by Biesenbach at KW Institute for Contemporary Art ===
- Peter Moors, Andreas Rost, new works (1991)
- Ankunft: Valie Export, Leiko Ikemura, Christina Kubisch, Christiane Möbus, Maria Vedder, Joan Jonas and Aura Rosenberg (1992)
- Sans Frontieres: an Art in Ruins installation by Glyn Banks and Hannah Vowles with support of DAAD (1992)
- 37 Räume (1992)
- Getrennte Welten – with Nan Goldin and Gundula Schulze-Eldowy (1992)
- KW studios 92/93 with Fritz Balthaus, Alyssa de Lucia, Gero Gries, Ulrike Grossarth, Sabine Hornig, Günther Underburger (1993–1992)
- Milovan Markovic: Privat (1993)
- Sabine Hornig: Ateliereinbau II, co-organized (1993)
- Douglas Gordon: 24-h-Psycho (1993)
- Tony Oursler: White Trash (1993)
- Kunst: Sprache, group exhibition, co-organized (1994)
- Monica Bonvicini: Die Ecken des Lebens oder über eine perspektivische Architektur der Wahrheit (1994)
- Günter Unterburger, presentation of new sculptures (1994)
- Oniscus murarius: Constantino Ciervo, Ottmar Kiefer and Ampelio Zappalorto (1994)
- Tony Oursler: Horror (1994)
- Joseph Kosuth: Berlin Chronicle, a Temporary Media Monument for Walter Benjamin (1994)
- Spiral Jetty – Hotel Palenque, installations by Robert Smithson (1994)
- Inez van Laamsweerde/Judy Fox, sculpture and photography curated with Katrin Becker (1995)
- Christine Hill, first solo exhibition (1995)
- Matthias Hoch: new photography (1995)
- Paul Armand Gette, site specific installation (1995)
- Ulrike Grossarth: Reste vom Mehrwert (1995)
- Jutta Koether: DÉBORDEMENT (1995)
- Bruce Nauman: Changing Light Corridor with Rooms (1995)
- Vito Acconci: The Red Tapes (1995)
- Jürgen Albrecht, first solo exhibition, co-organized (1995)
- Sonnenstunden – Das Bankprojekt, 3 Jahre Vera Bourgeois (1995)
- Hannes Rickli: Kugel (1995)
- Katrin Hoffert, first solo exhibition (1995)
- Christine Borland: From life (1996)
- Bodo Schlack, new paintings (1996)
- Preparation of the 1. berlin biennial for contemporary art (1996)
- Gunda Förster, site-specific illumination of Kunst-Werke (1996)
- Café Bravo, a pavilion designed by Dan Graham for the courtyard of the KW (1998)
- Elke Krystufek: I am your mirror (1999)
- Construction Drawings (1999)
- Dan Graham: Pavilions (1999)
- Woodland: Susanne Gertud Kriemann, co-organized (1999)
- Eija Liisa Ahtila: ME/WE; OKAY; GRAY (1999)
- Joachim Koester: Untitled (La Nuit Americaine) (1999)
- Tony Oursler: Frozen (1999)
- Sommeraccrochage (1999)
- Exhibitions for the Re-Opening of Kunst-Werke (1999)
- Warten (1999)
- Matthew Barney: Cremaster 2 (2000)
- Piotr Uklanski: Die Nazis (2000)
- Lara Schnitger, first German solo exhibition (2000)
- Mick O'Shea, site specific installation (2000)
- Paul Pfeiffer, first European solo exhibition (2000)
- Dinos und Jake Chapman: What the hell I-X (2000)
- Francisco de Goya: Desastres de la Guerra (2000)
- Erik Steinbrecher: Couch Park (2000)
- John Isaacs: A Necessary Change of Heart (2000)
- Sencer Vardarman: Corridors (2000)
- Jordan Crandall: Drive, Track 1 (2000)
- Nic Hess: Dolly II (2000)
- Santiago Sierra, first German solo exhibition (2000)
- Ghada Amer, New Paintings (2000)
- Jonathan Meese, Performance and solo presentation (2000)
- Never Mind the Nineties, a lecture series including Rirkrit Tiravanija, Douglas Gordon, Gabriel Orozco, Christine Borland, Pipilotti Rist, Jake and Dinos Chapman, Angela Bulloch, and Tobias Rehberger; Artclub, co-organized with Katharina Sieverding (2000)
- Ulrike Ottinger, Abbas Kiarostami (2001)
- Abbas Kiarostami, selection of photographs of the Iranian filmmaker (2001)
- Doug Aitken: I am in you, solo exhibition in collaboration with Kunstmuseum Wolfsburg, co-organized (2001)
- Christoph Keller: Encyclopaedia Cinematographica, co-organized (2001)
- Takashi Murakami: Special Mission Project ko2 (2001)
- Henry Darger, Disasters of War (2001)
- Heike Baranowsky, first solo survey of media-based works (2001)
- Jane & Louise Wilson, installation of the British artist duo, co-organized (2002)
- Francis Alÿs - Alejandro González Iñárritu (2002)
- Mexico City: An Exhibition about the Exchange Rates of Bodies and Values (2002)
- Hedi Slimane: Berlin (2003)
- Taryn Simon: The Innocents (2004)
- Fassbinder: Berlin Alexanderplatz (2007)
- Political/Minimal (2008)
- Christoph Schlingensief, co-organized (2013)
- Ryan Trecartin, Site Visit, co-organized (2014)

=== Exhibitions organized and co-organized by Biesenbach at MoMA PS1 ===
- MoMA PS1 opening exhibition co-curated with Alanna Heiss, Michael Tarantino and Kazue Kobata (1997)
- Generation Z, co-organized (1999)
- The Promise of Photography, a selection of the photographic collection of the DZ Bank (1999)
- Children of Berlin (1999–2000)
- Greater New York, ko-organisiert (2000)
- Disasters of War (2000)
- Takashi Murakami: Transformer (2000)
- Special Mission Project ko2: Takashi Murakami (2001)
- Kimsooja (2001)
- Henry Darger, Disasters of War (2001)
- Loop – Alles auf Anfang (2001–2002)
- Single Channel Works from the Collections of Pamela and Richard Kramlich and New Art Trust, organized with Christopher Eamon and Barbara London (2002)
- Mexico City: An Exhibition About the Exchange Rate of Bodies and Values (2002)
- Chris Cunningham (2002)
- First Steps, emerging artists from Japan (2003)
- Taryn Simon: The Innocents (2003)
- Hedi Slimane: Berlin (2003)
- Hard Light, co-organized with Doug Aitken (2004)
- Greater New York, co-organized (2005)
- Johannes Van Der Beek, part of group show "Special Projects" (2005)
- Into Me/Out of Me (2006)
- Abbas Kiarostami: Image Maker (2007)
- Mark Lewis: Northumberland (2007)
- Fassbinder: Berlin Alexanderplatz (2007)
- Kenneth Anger, co-organized with Susanne Pfeffer (2009)
- Michael Joaquin Grey (2009)
- Jonathan Horowitz: And/Or (2009)
- 100 Years (version #2, PS1, Nov. 2009)
- Mickalene Thomas: Le Déjeuner Sur L'herbe: Les Trois Femmes Noires (2010)
- Greater New York, co-organized (2010)
- On-Site 3: Mickalene Thomas (2010)
- Feng Mengbo (2010)
- Laurel Nakadate (2011)
- Francis Alÿs (2011)
- Jeremy Shaw: Best Minds (2011)
- Rania Stephan (2011)
- Ryan Trecartin: Any Ever, co-organized (2011)
- Ferhat Özgür: I Can Sing (2012)
- Max Brand: no solid footing – (trained) duck fighting a crow (2012)
- Kraftwerk – Retrospective 1 2 3 4 5 6 7 8 (2012)
- Cyprien Gaillard: The Crystal World (2013)
- Jeff Elrod: Nobody Sees Like Us (2013)
- Zero Tolerance (2014)
- Francesco Vezzoli: Teatro Romano (2014)
- Rockaway Projekte with Patti Smith, Janet Cardiff, Adrián Villar Rojas in Rockaway Beach (2014)
- Christoph Schlingensief, co-organized (2014)
- Korakrit Arunanondchai (2014)
- Halil Altindere: Wonderland (2015)
- Björk's Stonemilker by Andrew Thomas Huang (2015)
- Wael Shawky: Cabaret Crusades (2015)
- Katharina Grosse: Rockaway!, painted house on the ocean (2016)
- Cao Fei (2016)
- Vito Acconci: Where We Are Now (Who Are We Anyway?) (2016)
- Stanya Kahn: Stand in the Stream (2017)
- Alvaro Barrington (Painting Studio) (2017)
- Michael E Smith (2017)
- Land: Zhang Huan and Li Binyuan (2018)
- Reza Abdoh, co-organized (2018)
- Walter Price: New Paintings (2018)
- Elle Pérez: Diabolo (2018)
- Rockaway! Narcissus Garden by Yayoi Kusama (2018)

=== Exhibitions organized and co-organized by Biesenbach at MoMA ===
- New Works/ New Acquisitions, co-organized with Ann Temkin (2004)
- Take Two. Worlds and Views: Contemporary Art from the Collection, co-organized with Roxana Marcoci (2005)
- Douglas Gordon: Timeline (2006)
- Doug Aitken: Sleepwalkers, co-commissioned with Creative Time (2007)
- Abbas Kiarostami: Image Maker (2007)
- Sigalit Landau: Projects 87 (2008)
- Olafur Eliasson: Take your time. co-curated with Roxana Marcoci, Curator, Department of Photography (2008)
- Pipilotti Rist: Pour Your Body Out (7354 Cubic Meters) (2008)
- Roman Ondák: Performance 4 (2009)
- Tehching Hsieh: Performance 1 (2009)
- William Kentridge: Five Themes, co-organized (2010)
- Marina Abramović: The Artist is Present (2010)
- Andy Warhol: Motion Pictures (2010)
- Francis Alÿs: A Story of Deception (2011)
- Kraftwerk – Retrospective 1 2 3 4 5 6 7 8 (2012)
- Antony and the Johnsons: Swanlights with Symphony Orchestra, commissioned by MoMA and performed at Radio City Music Hall (2012)
- Björk (2015)
- Yoko Ono: One Woman Show, 1960–1971 (2015)
- Nan Goldin: The Ballad of Sexual Dependency (2016)
- Teiji Furuhashi: Lovers, co-organized (2016)
- Xaviera Simmons: The Gold Miner's Mission to Dwell on the Tide Line (Dez 2015 – May 2017)
- Unfinished Conversations: New Work from the Collection, co-organized (2017)
- The Modern Window: Firelei Báez, MoMA (2018–2019)

=== Exhibitions organized and co-organized by Biesenbach at Neue Nationalgalerie ===
- Our Space to Help: Fundraiser at the Neue Nationalgalerie, initiated by Klaus Biesenbach, in collaboration with Anne Imhof and Olafur Eliasson (2022)
- Anne Teresa De Keersmaeker: Rosas. Dark Red (2022)
- Maria Kulikovska: »254«, Performance (2022)
- Barbara Kruger: Bitte lachen / Please cry (2022)
- »Sound in the Garden«, series of concerts initiated by Klaus Biesenbach (2022)
- A Day in Greenery: The Kulturforum Gardens Programme (2022)
- Simone Forti: Huddle (2022)
- Allora & Calzadilla, Stop, Repair, Prepare: Variations on "Ode to Joy" for a Prepared Piano (2022)
- Monica Bonvicini: I do you (2022)
- Isa Genzken: 75/75 (2023)
- »Sound in the Garden«, series of events with MARYAM.fyi, caner tekker: KIRKPINAR, Älice, Wandermüd, Imran Ayata & Bülent Kullukcu with Cavidan Ünal, and Deep Gold Band
- Reference Festival x Neue Nationalgalerie: Transition (2023)
- Perform! with Yoko Ono: Cut Piece, and Göksu Kunak: Venus (2023)
- Ulrich Rückriem: 40 Floor Reliefs (2023-2024)
- Josephine Baker: Icon in Motion (2024)
- Pussy Riot: Rage (2024)
- Lucy Raven (2024)
- Miles Greenberg: Sebastian, Venice Biennale (2024)
- Andy Warhol: Velvet Rage and Beauty (2024)

=== Additional solo and group exhibitions organized and co-organized by Biesenbach ===
- Installation by Kumiko Shimizu, Elisabethkirche, Berlin, co-organized (1991)
- Dialog im Bode Museum mit Isa Genzken, Klaus vom Bruch, Svetlana und Igor Kopystiansky, Strawalde, Staatliche Museen Preussischer Kulturbesitz, Bode-Museum Berlin (1992)
- Christo vor der Verhüllung, Marstall Berlin with Gabriele Muschter (1993)
- Deutschland wird Deutscher, a project throughout Berlin organized in collaboration with Katharina Sieverding and UdK (1993)
- Club Berlin, Venice Biennale (1995)
- Projected Images: Venice Biennale (1995)
- Nach Weimar, Weimar, co-organized (1996)
- Hybrid Workspace bei der Documenta X, Kassel, co-organized (1997)
- 1.Berlin Biennale for contemporary art, co-organized (1998)
- Site Construction with Monica Bonvicini, Thomas Demand, Manfred Pernice, Jonathan Meese, South London Gallery (1998)
- Henry Darger, Disasters of War, Migros Museum, Zurich; Watari-Um, The Watari Museum of Contemporary Art, Tokyo; Magazin 3, Stockholm Konsthall (2001)
- Loop - Alles auf Anfang, Kunsthalle of the Hypo-Kulturstiftung, Munich and Cincinnati (2001– 2002)
- Shanghai Biennale, co-organized (2002)
- First Steps, emerging artists from Japan, Tokyo Convention Center, co-organized (2001)
- The Ten Commandments, a large-scale group show with 63 international artists, Deutsches Hygienemuseum Dresden (2004)
- Francis Alÿs, Martin-Gropius-Bau, Berlin (2004)
- Andy Warhol, Moving Pictures, Museum of Modern Art, Rio de Janeiro, MALBA Buenos Aires (2004/2005)
- Regarding Terror: The Red Army Faction-Exhibition, Berlin and Graz, co-organized (2005)
- 11 Rooms, with Hans Ulrich Obrist at Manchester Art Gallery (2011)
- 12 Rooms, with Hans Ulrich Obrist at Museum Folkwang, Essen (2012)
- 13 Rooms, with Hans Ulrich Obrist at Kaldor Public Art Projects, Sydney (2013)
- 14 Rooms, with Hans Ulrich Obrist at Beyeler Fondation, Basel (2014)
- 15 Rooms, with Hans Ulrich Obrist at Long Museum, Shanghai (2014)
- Procesion Migracion con Papo Colo as an Ecology Procession through the rain forest in Puerto Rico (2016)
- ..com/.cn, K11, Shanghai, traveled to K11, Hong Kong (2017–18)

== Publications ==
=== Selected digital content for MOCA ===
25 Virtual Studio Visits

==== Season 1 ====
- Marina Abramović (June 2020)
- Hank Willis Thomas (June 2020)
- Elizabeth Peyton (May 2020)
- Olafur Eliasson (May 2020)
- Camille Henrot (March 2020)
- Arthur Jafa (May 2020)
- Katharina Grosse (May 2020)
- Marilyn Minter (May 2020)
- Nancy Rubens (May 2020)
- Anicka Yi (April 2020)
- Mark Grotjahn (April 2020)
- Catherine Opie (April 2020)
- Mary Weatherford (April 2020)
- Shirin Neshat (April 2020)
- Korakrit Arunanondchai (April 2020)

==== Season 2 ====
- Sarah Sze (March 2021)
- Doris Salcedo (February 2021)
- Doug Aitken (February 2021)
- William Kentridge (February 2021)
- Simone Forti (January 2021)
- Mickalene Thomas (December 2020)
- Jeff Koons (unreleased) (November 2020)
- Tomás Saraceno (October 2020)
- Huma Bhabha (October 2020)
- Pipilotti Rist (September 2020)

=== Selected publications ===
==== 2024 ====
- Klaus Biesenbach and Bettina Funcke, Andy Warhol: Velvet Rage and Beauty. Berlin: Neue Nationalgalerie. ISBN 978-3-7913-7765-0
- Isa Genzken. 75/75, Berlin: Neue Nationalgalerie.
- Klaus Biesenbach, co-editor, Josephine Baker. Icon in Motion. Berlin: Neue Nationalgalerie.

==== 2021 ====
- Klaus Biesenbach, co-editor, 30 Years KW Berlin: A History, Berlin: Kunst-Werke.

==== 2019 ====
- Klaus Biesenbach and Bettina Funcke, MoMA PS1: A History. New York: Museum of Modern Art. ISBN 978-1-63345-069-1

==== 2015 ====
- Klaus Biesenbach and Christophe Cherix, Yoko Ono: One Woman Show, 1960-1971. New York: Museum of Modern Art. ISBN 9780870709661
- Klaus Biesenbach et al., Björk: Mid-Career Retrospective With New Commissioned Pieces for MoMA. New York: Museum of Modern Art. ISBN 9780870709609

==== 2014 ====
- Klaus Biesenbach et al., 14 Rooms. Ostfildern: Hatje Cantz. ISBN 978-3-7757-3915-3

==== 2013 ====
- Klaus Biesenbach et al., Christoph Schlingensief. London: Koenig Books. ISBN 3863354958

==== 2010 ====
- Klaus Biesenbach, Neville Wakefield and Cornelia Butler: Greater New York 2010. New York: MoMA PS1, 2010. ISBN 978-0-9841776-2-2
- Klaus Biesenbach, Agustin Perez Rubio, Beatrix Ruf and Ugo Rondinone: The Night of Lead: Ugo Rondinone. Edited by Beatrix Ruf, Osterlilden: Hatje Cantz, 2010. ISBN 978-3-7757-9006-2
- Klaus Biesenbach and Mark Godfrey (Ed.): A Story of Deception: Francis Alÿs. New York: The Museum of Modern Art, 2009. ISBN 978-0-87070-790-2

==== 2009 ====
- Klaus Biesenbach (Ed.): The Artist is Present: Marina Abramović. New York: The Museum of Modern Art, 2009. ISBN 978-0-87070-747-6
- Klaus Biesenbach: Henry Darger. München/New York: Prestel, 2009. ISBN 978-3-7913-4210-8
- Klaus Biesenbach, Michael Aupingen, Carolyn Christov-Bakargiev, Cornelia H. Butler, Judith B. Hecker and William Kentridge: Five Themes: William Kentridge. Edited by Mark Rosenthal, San Francisco Museum of Modern Art, 2009. ISBN 978-0-300-15048-3
- Klaus Biesenbach, Kelly Taylor and Jonathan Horowitz: And/Or. Edited by Lionel Bovier, Zürich: JRP Ringer, 2009. ISBN 978-3-03764-018-0
- Klaus Biesennbach (Ed.): Political, Minimal. Nürnberg: Verlag für moderne Kunst, 2009. ISBN 978-3-941185-07-4

==== 2008 ====
- Klaus Biesenbach, Marina Abramović, Chrissie Iles and Kristine Stiles: Marina Abramović. New York: Phaidon, 2008. ISBN 978-0-7148-4802-0
- Klaus Biesenbach, Daniel Birnbaum, Jenny Dirksen, Philipp Fürnkäs, Kaye Geipel and Ulrike Groos: Julia Stoschek Collection Number One: Destroy, she said. Osterfilden: Hatje Cantz, 2008. ISBN 978-3-7757-2231-5

==== 2007 ====
- Klaus Biesenbach, Peter Eleey, Glenn Lowry and Doug Aitken: Sleepwalkers: Doug Aitken. New York: The Museum of Modern Art, 2007. ISBN 978-0-87070-045-3
- Klaus Biesenbach: Rainer Werner Fassbinder: Berlin Alexanderplatz. Berlin: KW Institute for Contemporary Art, 2007. ISBN 978-3-8296-0253-2
- Klaus Biesenbach, Georges Bataille and Susan Sontag: Into Me / Out of Me. Edited by Klaus Biesenbach, Ostfilden: Hatje Cantz 2007. ISBN 978-3-7757-2041-0
- Klaus Biesenbach: In Bildern denken – Kunst, Medien und Ethik: Ist die Kunst den Medien noch gewachsen?. Regensburg: Lindinger + Schmid Kunstprojekte und Verlag, 2007. ISBN 978-3-929970-66-1

==== 2006 ====
- Klaus Biesenbach (Ed.): Timeline: Douglas Gordon. New York: The Museum of Modern Art, 2006. ISBN 978-0-87070-390-4

==== 2005 ====
- Klaus Biesenbach and Alanna Heiss (Ed.): Close-Ups: Katharina Sieverding. Berlin: KW Institute for Contemporary Art, 2005. ISBN 978-3-9804265-5-8
- Klaus Biesenbach, Alanna Heiss and Anthony Huberman (Ed.): Animations. New York: P.S.1 Contemporary Art Center, 2003. ISBN 978-3-9804265-0-3
- Klaus Biesenbach, Mary Lea Bandy and Laurence Kardish (Ed.): Motion Pictures: Andy Warhol. Berlin: KW Institute for Contemporary Art, 2005. ISBN 978-3-9804265-4-1
- Klaus Biesenbach (Ed.): Greater New York 2005. New York: P.S.1 Contemporary Art Center 2005. ISBN 978-0-87070-987-6
- Klaus Biesenbach and Matthew Monahan: Fragile Kingdom: Lara Schniger. Amsterdam: Artimo, 2005. ISBN 978-90-8546-001-5
- Klaus Biesenbach, Vanessa Adler, Ellen Blumenstein and Felix Ensslin (Ed.): Zur Vorstellung des Terror: RAF. Göttingen: Steidl, 2005. ISBN 978-3-86521-102-6

==== 2004 ====
- Klaus Biesenbach (Ed.): Disasters of War: Henry Darger. Berlin: KW Institute for Contemporary Art, 2004. ISBN 978-3-9804265-3-4
- Klaus Biesenbach (Ed.): Die Zehn Gebote. Osterfilden: Hatje Cantz, 2004. ISBN 978-3-7757-1453-2

==== 2003 ====
- Klaus Biesenbach and Alanna Heiss (Ed.): Video Acts. New York: P.S.1 Contemporary Art Center, 2003. ISBN 978-0-9704428-5-7
- Klaus Biesenbach, Alanna Heiss and Anthony Huber (Ed.): Mexico City. New York: P.S.1 Contemporary Art Center, 2003. ISBN 978-0-9704428-4-0

==== 2001 ====
- Klaus Biesenbach (Ed.): Loop - Alles auf Anfang. New York: Klaus Biesenbach for P.S. 1 / MoMA, 2001.
- Klaus Biesenbach (Ed.): KW Magazine #02/01 Special Issue Mediarealities. Berlin: KW Institute for Contemporary Art, 2001.
- Klaus Biesenbach (Ed.): KW Magazine #01/01. Berlin: KW Institute for Contemporary Art, 2001.

==== 1997 ====
- Klaus Biesenbach and Emma Dexter: Chapmanworld. London: ICA London, Berlin: KW Institute for Contemporary Art, 1997.
- Klaus Biesenbach and Ulrike Grossarth: Reste vom Mehrwert: Ulrike Grossarth. Berlin: KW Institute for Contemporary Art, 1997.

==== 1996 ====
- Klaus Biesenbach and Nicolas Schafhausen (Ed.): Nach Weimar. Osterfilden: Hatje Cantz, 1996.

==== 1994 ====
- Klaus Biesenbach, Christine Hill and Barbara Steiner: Christine Hill. Berlin: Eigen+Art/ KW Institute for Contemporary Art, 1995.
- Klaus Biesenbach and Harald Fricke (Ed.): Joseph Kosuth. Berlin Chronicle – A Temporary Media Monument for Walter Benjamin. Berlin: KW Institute for Contemporary Art, 1994.

==== 1992 ====
- Klaus Biesenbach (Ed.): Berlin 37 Räume. Berlin: KW Institute for Contemporary Art, 1992.

=== Selected recent contributions ===
==== 2018 ====
- Klaus Biesenbach, "We Had to Create Something New': Klaus Biesenbach on Inventing the Berlin Biennale," ARTNews, 7 June 2018
- Klaus Biesenbach, "In Puerto Rico, Artists Rebuild and Reach Out," The New York Times, 25 January 2018

==== 2016 ====
- "Klaus Biesenbach Recalls the Founding of KW in Berlin 25 Years Ago, a Moment of 'Radical Change and Freedom'," ARTNews, 25 Nov. 2016

Klaus Biesenbach has also contributed texts to exhibition catalogs as well as edited volumes, and he has published articles in art journals, including Art & Australia, Artforum International, and Flash Art International. He wrote the monthly column "Erdkunde" for the German art magazine Monopol.
