= KW Institute for Contemporary Art =

Contemporary art institution in Berlin, Germany

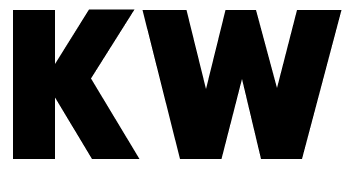

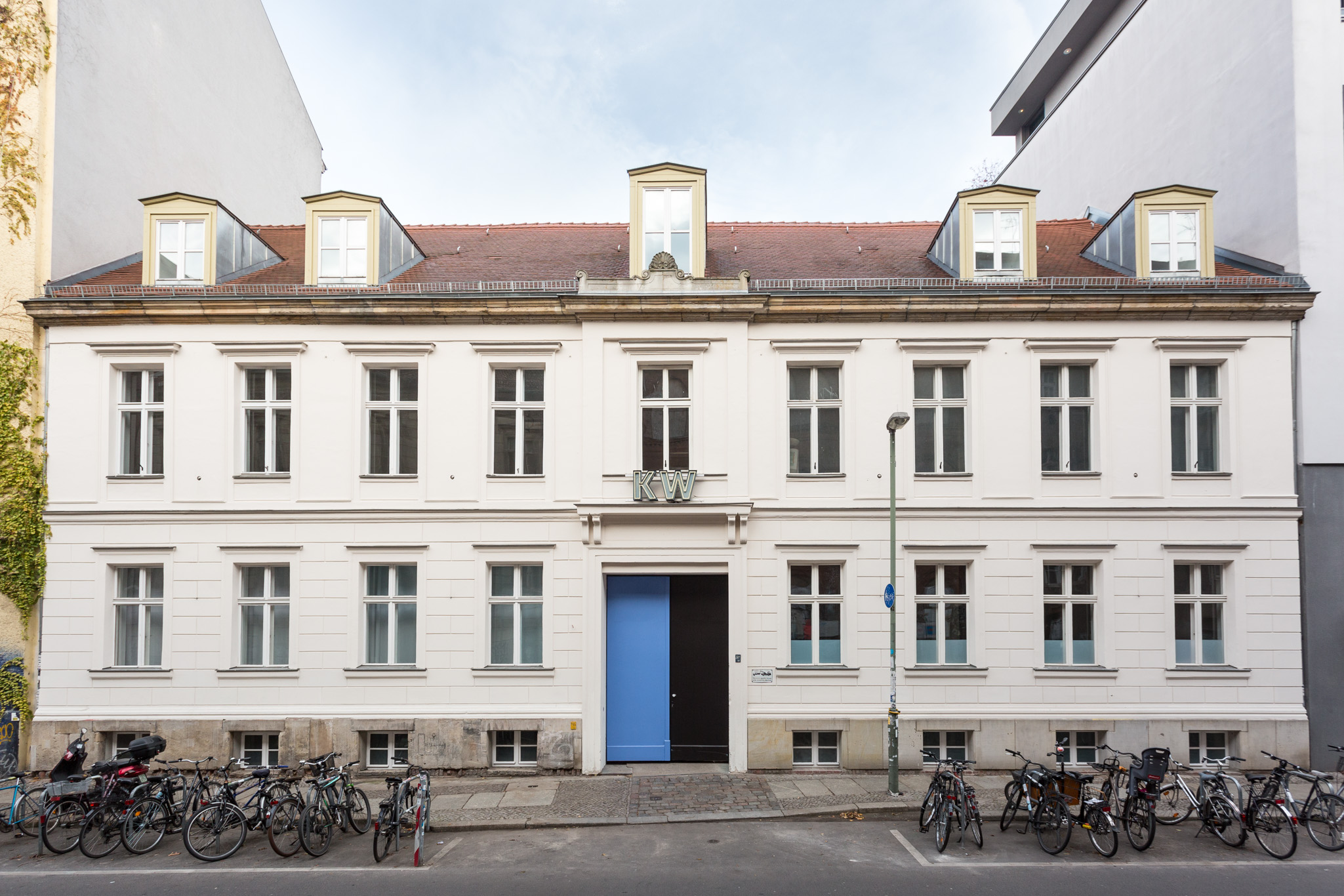
- Established: June 1, 1991
- Location: Berlin-Mitte, Germany

The KW Institute for Contemporary Art (also known as Kunst-Werke) is a contemporary art institution located in Auguststraße 69 in Berlin-Mitte, Germany. Klaus Biesenbach was the founding director of KW; the current director is Emma Enderby.

KW collaborates with other national and international contemporary art venues, such as MoMA PS1 in New York, the Julia Stoschek Collection in Düsseldorf/Berlin, Mophradat in Belgium, and the Schering Stiftung in Berlin.

== History ==
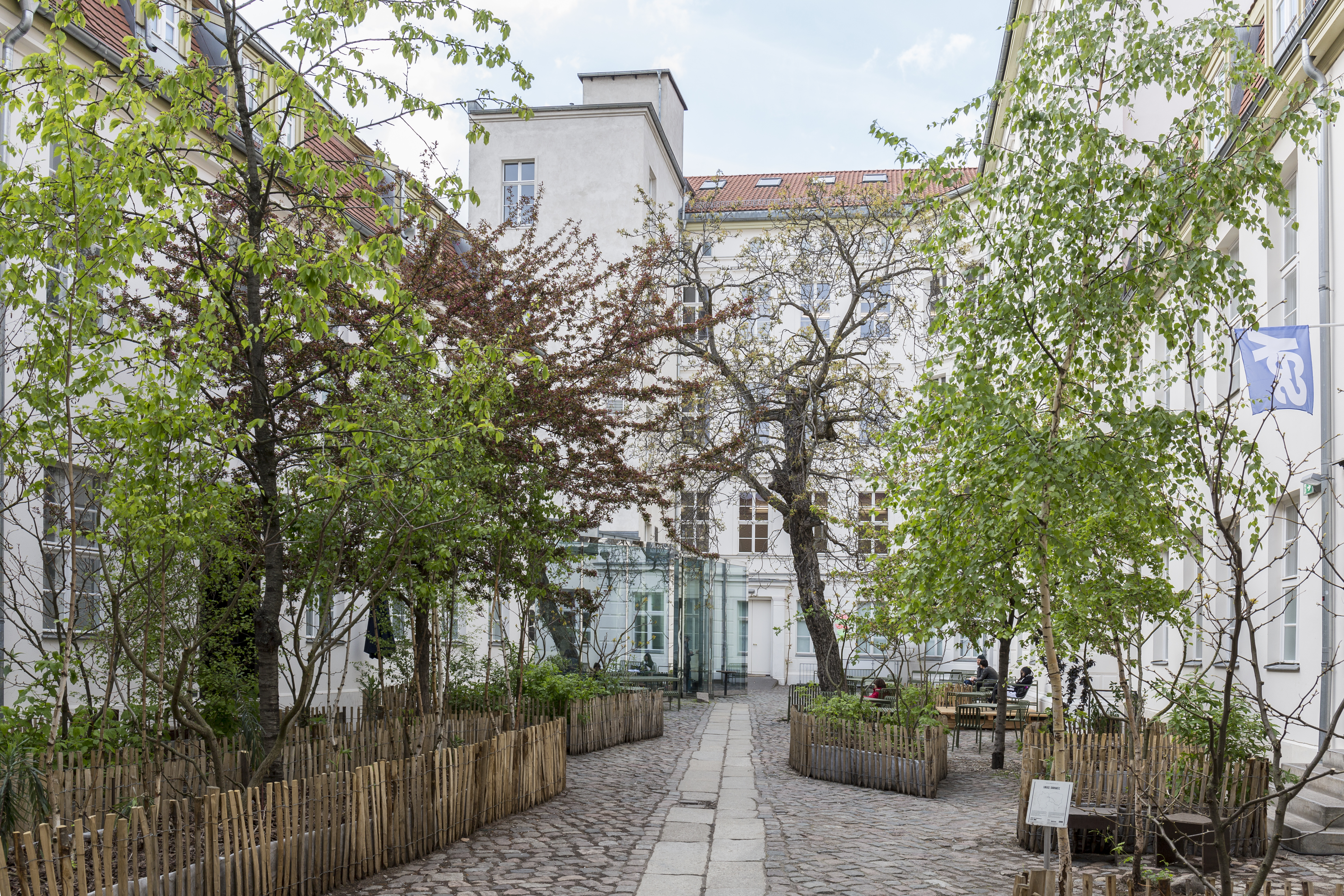
Courtyard KW Institute for Contemporary Art / Foreground: atelier le balto, Archipel, 2017, Courtesy atelier le balto / Background: Dan Graham, Café Bravo, 1999, Photo: Frank Sperling

The institute was founded July 1, 1991, less than two years after the fall of the Berlin Wall, in a derelict Berlin factory that once produced margarine. Its founders were Klaus Biesenbach, thena 25-year old medical student, the Swiss actress Alexandra Binswanger, Clemens Homburger, an architecture student, Philipp von Doering, a student of communications design, and Alfonso Rutigliano, an architecture student.

The Kunst-Werke part of the institute's name is a play on words, referring literally to artworks and metaphorically to the idea of a public utility that produces art.

== Building ==
The institute's building, which it still occupies, is located at Auguststrasse 69, in the Mitte district of Berlin. KW's original buildings included the margarine factory and an additional building at its rear that had produced quartz lamps and spray paint. These were leased to the institute in 1991, for 25 years, by the Wohnungsbaugesellschaft Mitte, a local housing association.

A dispute over the legality of the leases issued by the Wohnungsbaugesellschaft Mitte and a restitution effort related to the ownership of the buildings between the end of World War II and the establishment of the German Democratic Republic developed in the 1990s. In 1995 a fund associated with the Berlin Lottery Foundation purchased the building and leased it to the institute.

A grant from the Berlin Lottery Foundation funded additional renovations between 2016 and 2018.

== Selected exhibitions ==
=== 37 Räume (1992) ===
Exhibition concept of 37 curators at different venues at Scheunenviertel.

Curators: Art in Ruins, Thomas von Arx, Marius Babias, Henning Brandis, Kathrin Becker, Patrizia Bisci, Gunhild Brandler, Wolfgang Max Faust, Peter Funken, Zariamma Harat, Gabriele Horn, Micha Kapinos, Melitta Kliege, Romy Köcher, Maria Kreutzer, John Miller, minimal-club, Bojana Pejic, Jens Petersen, Catsou Roberts, Skúta, Helgason, Aura Rosenberg, Jeannot Simmen, Brigitte Sonnenschein, Beatrice Stammer, Angelika Stepken, Barbara Straka, Julya Theek, Annette Tietenberg, Sabine Vogel, Frank Wagner, Ingrid Wagner-Kantuser, Klara Wallner, Ryszard Wasko, Philipp Weiss, Ingeborg Wiensowski, Wolfgang Winkler, Thomas Wulffen (idea by Klaus Biesenbach).

=== Regarding Terror: The RAF Exhibition (2005) ===
In 2005, an exhibition on the public perception of the terrorist group Red Army Faction (RAF), curated by Ellen Blumenstein, Felix Ensslin, and Klaus Biesenbach, formed in and through the media caused a major controversy in Germany. Relatives of the terrorists' victims laid out their objections in an open letter to German Chancellor Gerhard Schröder. The exhibition was delayed when the political pressure led Biesenbach to withdraw the museum's application for €100,000 ($133,000) worth of state funding.

== Chief curators ==
- 2007–2012: Susanne Pfeffer
- 2013–2017: Ellen Blumenstein
- 2016–2024: Krist Gruijthuijsen
- 2024–present: Emma Enderby
