= Chris Henry (museum curator) =

English/Scottish museum curator

Chris Henry (born 1962) is a museum professional who was Director of Heritage at Surgeons' Hall Museums at the Royal College of Surgeons of Edinburgh.

== Early life and education ==
He was born in Gainsborough, Lincolnshire, England and attended Queen Elizabeth's Grammar School, Gainsborough. He subsequently attended Middlesex University graduating BA (Hons) in History (1993), King's College, London graduating MA in War Studies (1994) and University College, London, graduating MA in Museum Studies (1999).

== Career ==
Henry's career path followed an initial interest in military museology as Curator of Artillery, Royal Armouries Tower of London and Royal Armouries Fort Nelson (1994–99), Head of Collections, Museum of the Royal Regiment of Artillery (2000–2003), then Head of Collections, Museum of Naval Firepower, Gosport Hampshire (2003–2005) where he supervised delivery of Firepower Royal Artillery Museum in Woolwich in 2005 . Moving to Scotland he was Director, Museum of Scottish Lighthouses, Fraserburgh before becoming Head of Collections, Dundee Industrial Heritage, covering RRS Discovery and Verdant Works. He was appointed Director of Heritage, Surgeons Hall Museum. Royal College of Surgeons of Edinburgh in 2010. Here he organised financing and delivery of the £4.5 million Lister Project which transformed the Museum layout and displays. This project was nominated for six different architectural and heritage awards and was Highly Commended in the RICS Awards for 2016. He retired from this post in 2023.

== Exhibitions ==
Henry has curated and delivered over thirty exhibitions in his career, from smaller temporary exhibitions to the completion of the upgrading of the Surgeons’ Hall Museums complex.

== Publications ==
His books and articles on museums and military subjects include:

Museums within a museum, in Medical Museums, Past Present and Future, Alberti S Ed.,(2013) London, Royal College of Surgeons. ISBN 978-1-904096-21-4

Shield of Empire (1998), Leeds, Trustees of the Royal Armories. ISBN 0948092335

British Napoleonic Artillery 1793-1815: Field Artillery v. 1 (New Vanguard) by Chris Henry and Brian Delf (16 Oct 2002) Oxford, Osprey Publishing. ISBN 1841764760

British Napoleonic Artillery 1793-1815: Siege and Coastal Artillery v. 2 by Chris Henry and Brian Delf (2003) Oxford, New Vanguard. ISBN 1841764779

Depth Charge: Royal Naval Mines, Depth Charges and Underwater Weapons 1914-1945, (2005) Barnsley, Pen and Sword. ISBN 1844151743

English Civil War Artillery 1642-51 (2005), Oxford, New Vanguard. ISBN 9781841767666

British Anti-tank Artillery 1939-45 (2004), Oxford, New Vanguard. ISBN 1841766380

The 25-pounder Field Gun 1939-72 (2002), Oxford, New Vanguard. ISBN 1841763500

The Ebro 1938: Death knell of the Republic– (1999), Oxford, Campaign. ISBN 1855327384

Napoleonic Naval Armaments 1792-1815 (2004), Oxford, New Vanguard. ISBN 1841766356

Battle of the Coral Sea (Great Naval Battles) (2003), Washington, US Naval Institute Press. ISBN 1591140331

== Personal life ==
Chris Henry lives in Fife in Scotland with his wife Jane and daughter Charlotte.
