= Royal College of Surgeons of Edinburgh =

Medical Royal College

The Royal College of Surgeons of Edinburgh
- Founded: 1505; 521 years ago
- Founder: King James IV
- Purpose: Surgical education, training and standards
- Coordinates: 55.9468°N 3.1835°W
- Website: www.rcsed.ac.uk

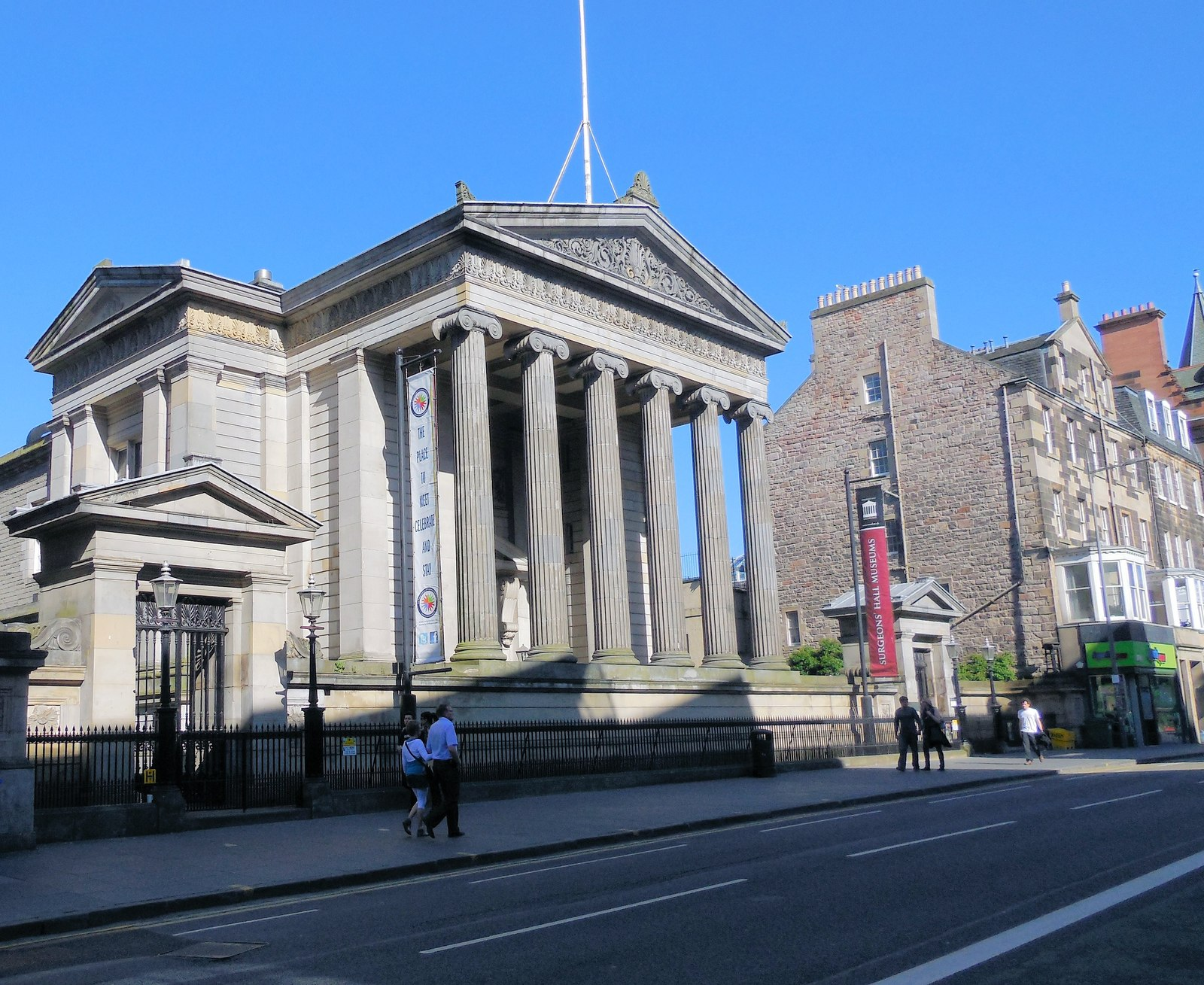
Surgeons Hall

The Royal College of Surgeons of Edinburgh (RCSEd) is a professional organisation of surgeons. The RCSEd has five faculties, covering a broad spectrum of surgical, dental, and other medical and healthcare specialities. Its main campus is located on Nicolson Street, Edinburgh, centred around the Surgeons' Hall. The campus includes Surgeons' Hall Museums, a medical and surgical library, a skills laboratory, a symposium hall, administrative offices and a hotel. A second UK office was opened in Birmingham in 2014 and an international office opened in Kuala Lumpur, Malaysia, in 2018.

It is one of the oldest surgical corporations in the world and traces its origins to 1505 when the Barber Surgeons of Edinburgh were formally incorporated by the then Edinburgh Town Council by the granting of a seal of cause or charter.

RCSEd represents members and fellows across the UK and the world, spanning several disciplines, including surgery, dentistry, perioperative care, pre-hospital care, and remote, rural, and humanitarian healthcare. The majority of its UK members are based in England. Its membership includes those at all career stages from medical students to trainees, consultants, and those who have retired from practice.

The council is the governing body of RCSEd and represents the professional interests of the college membership. As a charitable organisation, the members of the council are also trustees of the college. The council comprises five office-bearers, 15 elected members, one trainee member, and the Dean of the Faculty of Dental Surgery.

== History ==
In 1505, the Edinburgh Incorporation of Barbers and Surgeons was formally incorporated from the earlier craft guild of the city, and this recognition is embodied in the Seal of Cause (or Charter of Privileges), which was granted to the Barber Surgeons by the Town Council of Edinburgh on 1 July 1505. The Seal of Cause conferred various privileges and imposed certain important duties, the most important of these being that every surgical master should have full knowledge of anatomy and surgical procedures and that surgical apprentices should be literate (a very unusual stipulation at that time). At the end of an apprenticeship, the apprentice's knowledge was to be tested, by examination, and the assessment and examination of surgeons remains a core function of the RCSEd to the present day. In 1722 the Barbers formally separated from the Incorporation. In 1778 King George III granted a new charter by which the Incorporation became The Royal College of Surgeons of the City of Edinburgh. In 2005 the RCSEd celebrated its quincentenary, having been in continuous existence for 500 years. The college maintains a continuous list of all its fellows, which is unbroken from 1581 to the present day.

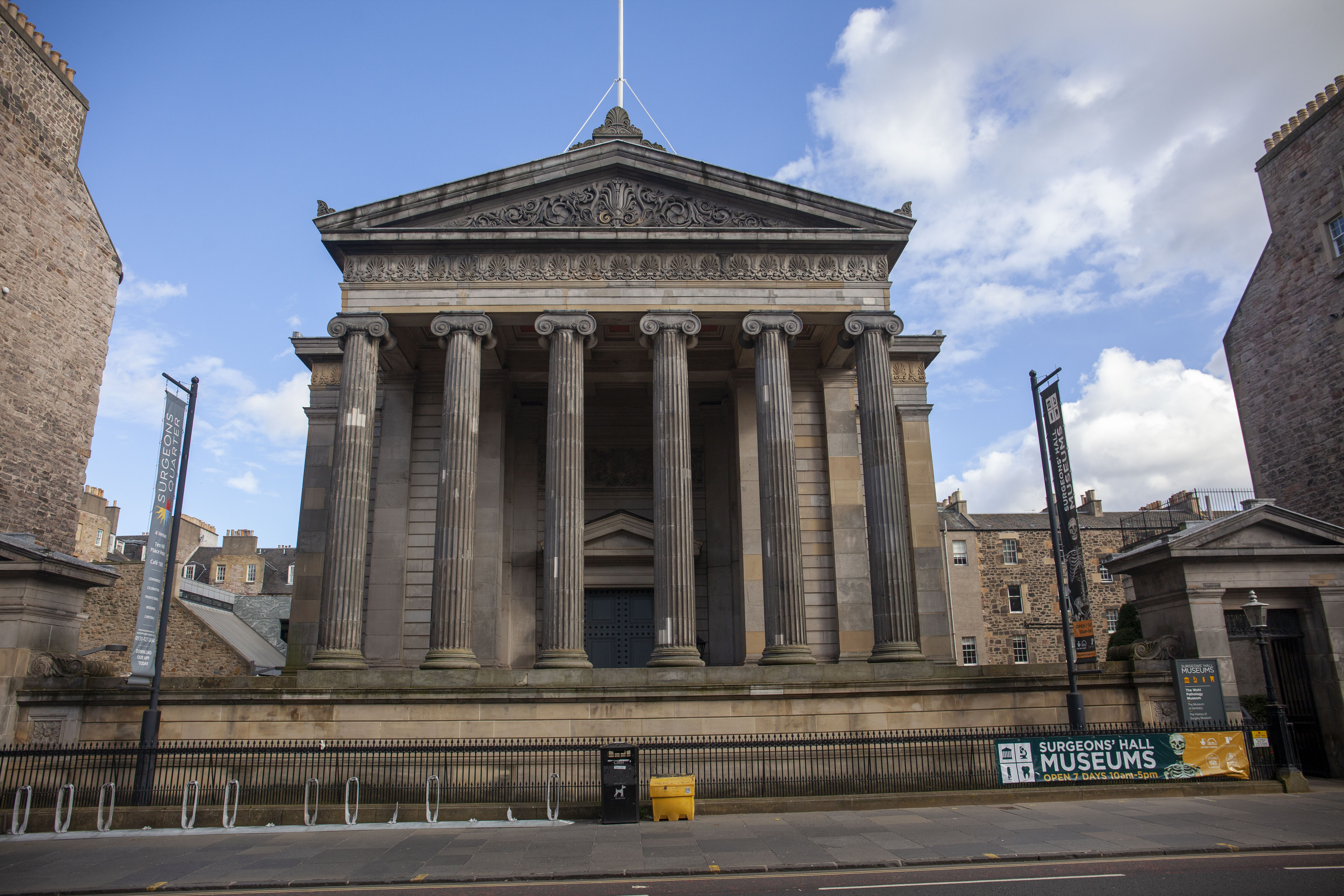
The 1832 Playfair Building, RCSEd, Edinburgh

== Functions ==
RCSEd aims to maintain and improve standards of surgical and dental practice by holding courses and educational programmes, through training and examinations, and by providing continuous professional development for trained surgeons and dentists. Through liaison with external medical bodies it aims to influence healthcare policy across the UK. RCSEd celebrated its quincentenary in 2005 with the opening of a new skills laboratory and conference venue, and the Ten Hill Place Hotel. In April 2014, the RCSEd opened a regional centre in Birmingham to cater for the 80% of its UK membership based in England and Wales and in 2018 opened an international office in Kuala Lumpur, Malaysia.

== Examinations ==
To be admitted as a member of the RCSEd (MRCS), trainee surgeons are required to sit and pass Membership of the Royal College of Surgeons (MRCS) examinations, which are usually taken in the first or second years of surgical training. Since September 2008, the MRCS has become an intercollegiate examination, with a syllabus, format, and content common to all four surgical colleges in the British Isles (the Royal College of Surgeons of Edinburgh, the Royal College of Surgeons of England, the Royal College of Surgeons in Ireland and the Royal College of Physicians and Surgeons of Glasgow). To become a fellow of the college the member must have successfully completed a defined period of higher surgical training, which varies according to speciality and must also have submitted a portfolio of operations performed and witnessed. The fellowship examination is conducted jointly by the four Surgical Royal Colleges (Edinburgh, England, Glasgow & Ireland), administered by the Joint Committee on Intercollegiate Examinations.

The college conducts a number of other examinations, including dental examinations and examinations in immediate medical care.

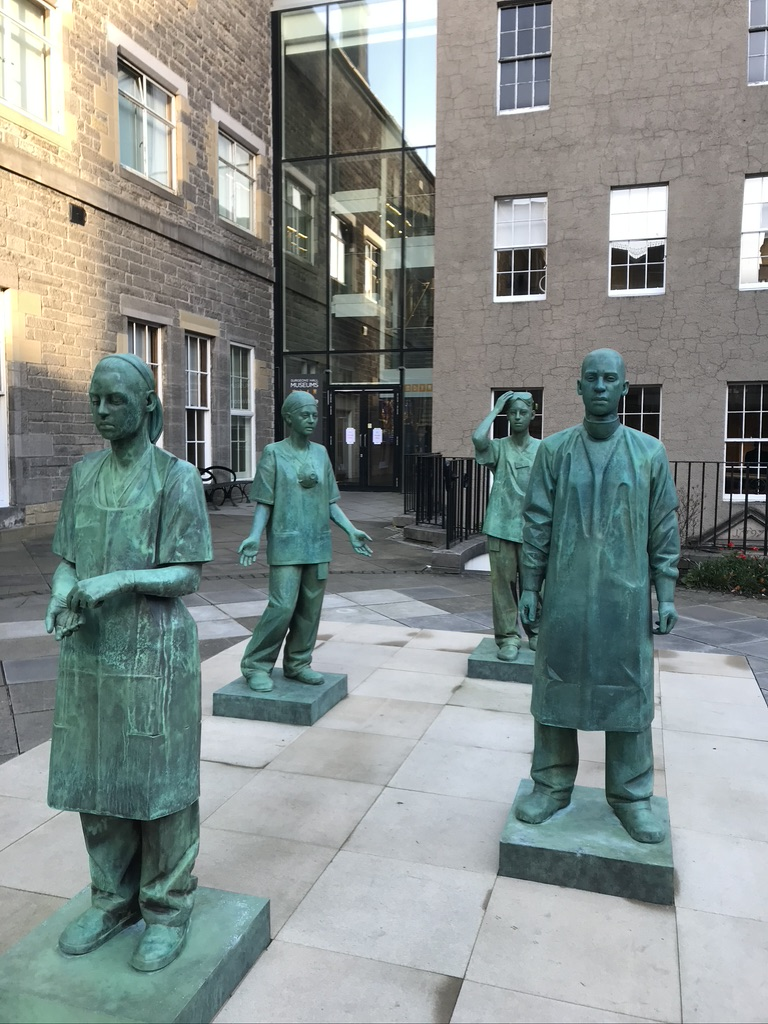
Memorial to healthcare workers at the Royal College of Surgeons of Edinburgh

== Education ==
The RCSEd runs a large range of educational events and courses for professionals ranging from medical students interested in surgery, through to surgical trainees and consultant specialists. Many of these courses are held in the surgical skills laboratory in the Edinburgh campus but other are held around the UK and abroad.

Common courses (as at 2024) include:

- Non-Technical skills for surgeons (NOTSS)

NOTSS aims to provide participants with an understanding and practical experience of the non-technical skills needed for safe patient care. These encompass cognitive and interpersonal skills which enhance individual and team performance in surgery.

- Edinburgh surgery online (ESO)

ESO is run in partnership with the University of Edinburgh. It consists of a series of postgraduate e-learning programmes for surgeons at various stages of their training. The programmes are based on the UK Intercollegiate Surgical Curriculum and allow trainees to select modules relevant to their subspecialty. ESO supports learning for the Fellowship of the Royal College of Surgeons (FRCS) examinations.

  - Training the Trainers: Trainer Development Course
  - Future Surgeons: Key Skills
  - Care of the Critically Ill Surgical Patient (CCrISP)
  - Foundation of Clinical Surgery
  - Dental Non-Technical Skills (DeNTS) Masterclass

== Faculties ==
There are six faculties within the RCSEd.

=== Faculty of Dental Surgery ===
Dentistry has been an important part of the RCSed since 1505, though the speciality remained largely unregulated in Edinburgh until the middle of the 19th century. In 1879, the Diploma of Licentiate in Dental Surgery (LDS) was introduced and recognised for admission to the Dentist's Register. In 1921, the Dentists Act raised standards, and only dentists who had been trained in a dental school could be admitted to the Register and allowed to practise dentistry.^{[} In 1948 the RCSEd introduced the diploma of Fellowship in Dental Surgery (FDSRCSEd) and in 1982, Dental Surgery became a distinct faculty within the College with a remit of education, training and maintenance of standards of professional competence and conduct.^{[}

It is the largest of the College's faculties with almost 7,000 fellows and members worldwide and has its own council. The Dental Faculty's portfolio consists of a wide range of examinations and courses which have been held in 17 countries around the world. These include

  - The Diploma of Membership of the Faculty of Dental Surgery (MFDS)
  - Membership in Advanced General Dental Surgery (MAGDS)
  - Specialty Membership Exams in Endodontics, Periodontics, Prosthodontics, Oral and Maxillofacial Surgery, Implant Dentistry, and Orthodontics (Part A and Part B)
  - Diplomas in Clinical Dental Technology, Orthodontic Therapy, Paediatric Dentistry for Dental Therapists and Special Care Dentistry
  - Tri-Collegiate Specialty Membership Exams in Oral Surgery, Paediatric Dentistry and Special Care Dentistry. The faculty works with its sister Colleges in London and Glasgow to deliver these.

=== Faculty of Pre-Hospital Care ===
Pre-hospital care is a well-established branch of medicine, now practised by a broad range of practitioners including first aiders, paramedics, first responders, voluntary aid workers, nurses and doctors. It also includes individuals interested in pre-hospital care working for multi-agency teams such as police, fire and armed forces.

The faculty's aim is to set and maintain clinical standards for all practitioners in this evolving specialty. The faculty runs the examinations for the Diploma of Immediate Medical Care, which covers pre-hospital care competencies. This examination utilises the Sandpiper Bag designed and provided by Sandpiper Trust.^{[}

=== Faculty of Surgical Trainers ===
The Faculty of Surgical Trainers is open by election to anyone who takes an active interest or involvement in surgical training in the UK and internationally, regardless of college affiliation. The faculty is the first of its kind in the UK and its purpose is to help support and develop surgeons in their role as surgical trainers.

=== Faculty of Dental Trainers ===
The Faculty of Dental Trainers was launched in 2016 by the Faculty of Dental Surgery. The purpose of the faculty is to enhance patient care and safety by promoting the highest standards of training in dentistry and to support trainers in developing their roles. The faculty is open to all dental members and fellows.^{[}

=== Faculty of Remote, Rural and Humanitarian Healthcare ===
The Faculty of Remote and Rural Healthcare was formally launched in November 2018. In 2020 it incorporated humanitarian into its structure becoming the Faculty of Remote, Rural and Humanitarian Healthcare.

The faculty was established in response to the need identified within both industry and the public health arena to define, review and set standards of competence for organisations as well as medical and non-medical personnel delivering healthcare in remote and rural environments. The faculty works with several partner organisations including: UK-MED, MediLink International, BASICS Scotland, the College of Remote and Offshore Medicine and the David Nott Foundation. It awards Membership and Fellowship to eminent individuals in the field of rural and austere medicine.

=== Faculty of Perioperative Care ===
The Faculty of Perioperative Care was established in 2016 in recognition of the evolving and increasingly important role that surgical care practitioners and surgical first assistants play as part of the wider surgical team in delivering safe surgical care to patients. Membership of the faculty is available to all perioperative practitioners such as surgical care practitioners; surgical first assistants and all those with similar titles involved in the delivery of high quality surgical care.

== Independent faculty ==
The Faculty of Sport and Exercise Medicine was launched in 2006 as an intercollegiate faculty of the RCSEd and Royal College of Physicians to develop and promote the medical specialty of Sport and Exercise Medicine. It later became an independent faculty, with its administration based in the RCSEd.The specialty is concerned with the diagnosis, management and prevention of medical conditions and injury in those who participate in physical activity.

== Publications ==
The Surgeon is an academic peer-reviewed journal published jointly by the RCSEd and the RCSI. It publishes clinical and scientific articles in the fields of surgery and dentistry, and related specialities such as healthcare management and education.

Surgeons News is a quarterly magazine published by RCSEd for its membership. It contains comment, opinion, reviews and reports on subjects relevant to its members and fellows.

== Awards and medals ==
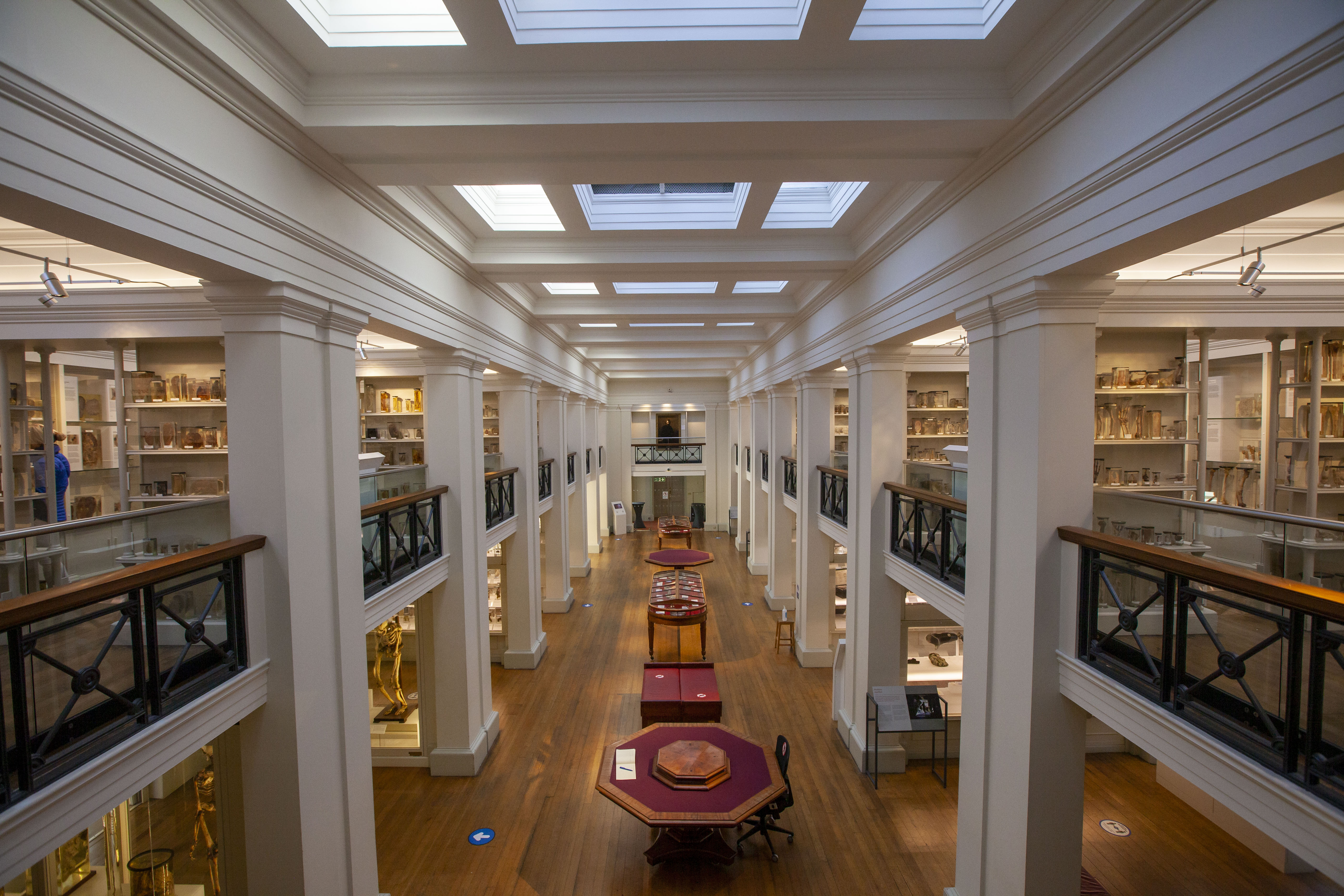
Surgeons' Hall Museums

The RCSEd awards around £1 million of research grants each year, in addition to travelling grants to further career development.

The medals awarded by the RCSEd include:

- Hunter Doig Medal: awarded every second year to a female Fellow or Member of the RCSEd who demonstrates career potential and ambition.
- The Syme Medal: awarded to a fellow or member on the basis of a recently submitted thesis (MD or PhD), or published body of research.
- King James IV professorship: awarded in open competition to surgeons or dentists who have made a significant contribution to the clinical and/or scientific basis of surgery.

== Surgeons Quarter ==
Surgeons Quarter (SQ) is the commercial arm of the RCSEd, which manages all commercial activities held within the RCSEd campus. Any surplus generated from its activities support the core aims of the RCSEd, education, training, assessment and research in surgery. SQ comprises six venues within the campus, the Playfair Building, the Quincentenary Conference Centre, the Symposium Hall, the Prince Philip Building, Ten Hill Place Hotel and Café 1505.

== Surgeons' Hall Museums ==
Surgeons' Hall Museum is open to the public and houses one of the largest collections of pathological artefacts in Britain. The museums date from 1699 and underwent major upgrading in 2015. Previous Conservators of the museums include the surgeons John Goodsir, Harry Goodsir, William Rutherford Sanders, James Bell Pettigrew, David Middleton Greig, and D. E. C. Mekie. Since 2001 the museum has been led by a trained museologist who is styled Director of Heritage, Directors have included Dawn Kemp, Chris Henry and Chanté St Clair Inglis.

== See also ==
- List of presidents of the Royal College of Surgeons of Edinburgh
