= Museum of Contemporary Art, Los Angeles =

The Museum of Contemporary Art, Los Angeles

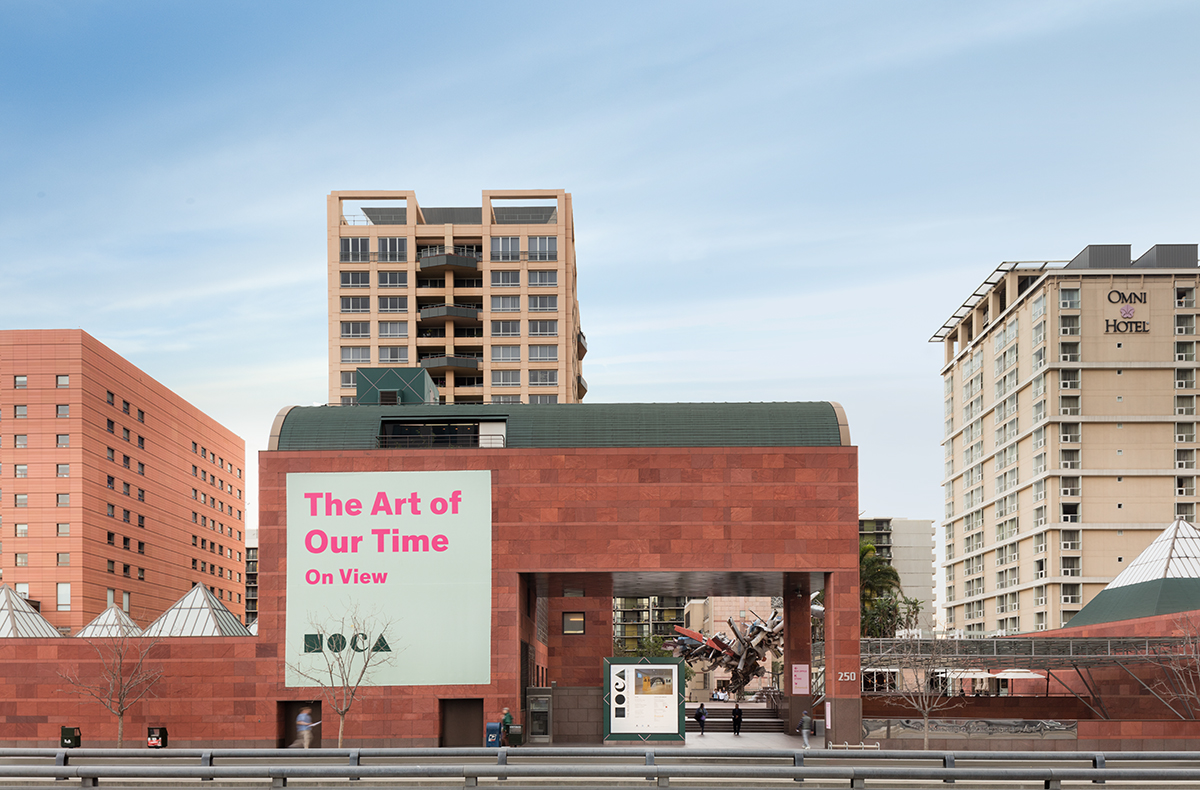
- The Museum of Contemporary Art in Downtown Los Angeles
- Established: 1979
- Location: 250 South Grand Avenue; Los Angeles, California 90012, U.S.
- Coordinates: 34°03′12″N 118°15′03″W
- Type: Art museum
- Director: Jonathan Abbott
- Public transit access: Pershing Square; Civic Center/Grand Park; Grand Avenue Arts/Bunker Hill
- Website: moca.org

The Museum of Contemporary Art, Los Angeles (MOCA) is a contemporary art museum which has two locations in Los Angeles. It was established in 1979 by artists, and has an 8,000 piece collection of what the New York Times called "world-class art," and a $25 million budget.

The main museum is located on Grand Avenue in Downtown Los Angeles, near the Walt Disney Concert Hall. The second location is MOCA's original space, initially intended as a temporary exhibit space while the main facility was built. It is now known as the Geffen Contemporary and is located in the Little Tokyo district of downtown Los Angeles. Between 2000 and 2019, it operated a satellite facility at the Pacific Design Center facility in West Hollywood.

The exhibits consist primarily of American and European contemporary art created after 1940. As of 2026, the collection included nearly 8,000 objects. Since the museum's inception, MOCA's programming has been defined by its multi-disciplinary approach to contemporary art.

== Founding ==
At a 1979 political fundraising event at the Beverly Hills Hotel, Los Angeles Mayor Tom Bradley, Councilman Joel Wachs, and local philanthropist Marcia Simon Weisman were seated at the same table. Throughout the evening, Weisman discussed the city's need for a contemporary art museum. Weisman's brother, Norton Simon, had aided the financially ailing Pasadena Art Museum in 1975. A few weeks later, the Mayor's Museum Advisory Committee was established. The committee, led by William Albert Norris, set about creating a museum from scratch, including locating funds, trustees, directors, curators, a gallery, and most importantly an art collection. Also in 1975, Weisman and five other key local collectors signed an agreement whereby they pledged items from their private collections, worth up to $6 million, "to create a museum of standing and repute."

The project got a boost when Los Angeles redevelopment agency administrators proposed that a new development of about 11 acres in Bunker Hill could comply with a requirement to devote 1.5 percent of its budget for art not by commissioning a few public art pieces, but by using 1.5 percent of the entire project's budget to build an entire museum. The deal worked out called for 100,000 square feet of interior space, a sculpture garden with a budget of $20 million.

In 1976, the fledgling Museum of Contemporary Art was operating out of an office on Boyd Street. The city's most prominent philanthropists and collectors had been assembled into a board of trustees in 1980, and set a goal of raising $10 million for an endowment (to generate 35-50 percent of the annual operating expenses) in their first year; an artists advisory council was involved early on. A working staff was brought together; Richard Koshalek was appointed chief curator; relationships were made with artists and galleries; and negotiations were begun to secure artwork and an exhibition space. Following Weisman's initiative, $1-million contributions from Eli Broad, Max Palevsky, and Atlantic Richfield Co. helped securing the construction of the new museum; Broad became MOCA's founding chairman; Palevsky chaired the architectural search committee. Other founding directors included Michael Ovitz and Robert Irwin. Many of MOCA's initial donors were young and supporting the arts for the first time; a substantial number joined up at the $10,000 "founder" minimum.

== Collection ==
Vanity Fair called the MOCA collection "the most impressive permanent collection of contemporary art in the country." Making up well over 90% of the museum's works, gifts from several major private collectors formed the cornerstones of MOCA's permanent collection of nearly 8,000 works. Much of it has come from board members who donated or bequeathed key works or entire collections, or sold art to the museum at highly favorable terms.

Included within today's permanent collection are works by further influential artists such as Greg Colson, Kim Dingle, Sam Durant, David Hockney, Kenneth Price, John McLaughlin, Robert Motherwell, Raymond Pettibon, James Hayward, and George Segal. As the Los Angeles Times declared, "There isn't a city in America—not New York, not Chicago, not Houston, not San Francisco—where a more impressive museum collection of contemporary art can be seen."

=== Panza Collection ===
Within months of its fall 1983 opening, MOCA was able to turn itself into an instant player in the international art world by striking a deal with one of its board members, Giuseppe Panza, who agreed to sell a group of works for $11 million and stagger the payments over five years, interest-free. The 1984 purchase of parts of the Panza Collection encompasses 80 seminal works of abstract expressionism and pop art by Jean Fautrier, Franz Kline, Roy Lichtenstein, Claes Oldenburg, Robert Rauschenberg, Mark Rothko, and Antoni Tàpies. At the time of the purchase, Panza and his wife turned down many "lucrative cash offers," because they wanted the works to be in a museum, MOCA LA specifically. In 1995, the Panzas donated 70 works - seven each by ten Southern California artists. The Panzas began collecting Los Angeles artists because, "the city always offers new creativity to anyone who approaches it without preconceived notions." Of the donation to the museum, he said "I felt it would be good for MOCA to have some examples of the works my wife and I had acquired. I saw this as a complement to the works from the Panza Collection that MOA has had in its possession for a decade and a half, but in which the art of Los Angeles was not represented." The ten artists in this second donation were Lawrence Carroll, Greg Colson, Jeff Colson, Ron Griffin. Roy Thurston, Mark Lere, Gregory Mahoney. Ross Rudel, Peter Shelton, and Robert Therrien.

=== 1980s ===
In 1985, the museum accepted Michael Heizer's earthwork Double Negative in Nevada desert, donated by Virginia Dwan. A 1986 bequest by television executive Barry Lowen included 67 works of minimalist, post-minimalist and neo-expressionist painting, sculpture, photography and drawing by artists such as Dan Flavin, Ellsworth Kelly, Agnes Martin, Elizabeth Murray, Julian Schnabel, Joel Shapiro, Frank Stella, and Cy Twombly. In 1989, pieces by the Rita and Taft Schreiber collection were donated to the museum, encompassing 18 paintings, sculptures, and drawings by Jackson Pollock, Piet Mondrian, and Arshile Gorky, among others. Hollywood agent Phil Gersh and his wife Beatrice, both founding members, gave 13 important pieces from their collection to the museum the same year, including Pollock's early drip painting Number 3, 1948 and David Smith's 8-foot-tall stainless steel sculpture Cubi III (1961)—as well as works by artists such as Ed Ruscha, Cindy Sherman, and Susan Rothenberg. Finally, the museum's co-founder Marcia Simon Weisman bequeathed 83 works on paper from artists including Willem de Kooning, Barnett Newman, Jasper Johns and California-based painters Richard Diebenkorn and Sam Francis.

=== 1990s ===
In 1991, Hollywood screenwriter Scott Spiegel donated works by Jean-Michel Basquiat, Mark Innerst, Robert Longo, Susan Rothenberg, David Salle, among others. In 2003, the museum received the promise of a gift of 33 pieces from advertising executive Clifford Einstein, chair of MOCA's board of trustees, and his wife, Madeline; the proposed donation included works by Kiki Smith, Nam June Paik, Mark Grotjahn, Sigmar Polke, Mike Kelley, and Lari Pittman. In 2004 the museum received the largest group of artworks donated by a private collector in its 25-year history when E. Blake Byrne, a MOCA trustee and retired television executive, gave 123 paintings, sculptures, drawings, videos and photographs by 78 artists. Over the years, major donations of art collections have come from the Lannan Foundation and through funding from the Ralph M. Parsons Foundation.

=== 2000s ===
During the 2000s, under director Jeremy Strick, MOCA expanded its holdings of installation, video, conceptual art and work by Los Angeles artists. Some 2,000 works were added during Strick's term, expanding the collection by one-third. Major additions in 2001 included large-scale works by Nancy Rubins, Paul McCarthy, Gabriel Orozco and Mona Hatoum, William Kentridge's Medicine Chest, and a gift of 37 photographs by James Welling. In 2003, the museum acquired Ed Ruscha's Chocolate Room, originally created for the 1970 Venice Biennale, including surviving materials, documentation and the exclusive right to reconstruct the installation. The largest addition of the decade was E. Blake Byrne's 2004 gift of 123 works by 78 artists, including John Baldessari, Robert Gober, Mike Kelley, Marlene Dumas, Gordon Matta-Clark, Yayoi Kusama and Felix Gonzalez-Torres; it was then the largest group of artworks donated to MOCA by a private collector. Later acquisitions included joint ownership with the Los Angeles County Museum of Art of Chris Burden's Hell Gate in 2006, Clifford and Madeline Einstein's promised gift of 33 works in 2007, and 50 predominantly Minimalist and Conceptual works received in 2008 through Dorothy and Herbert Vogel's Fifty Works for Fifty States project.

=== 2010s ===
The museum entered financially difficult times in the 2010s, but continued building the collection. In 2011, the museum purchased Elliott Hundley's 2011 work The Lightning Bride with museum funds, called one of the biggest 2011 acquisitions in size and stature by the Los Angeles Times. In 2011, Laurence Rickels, a former professor at UC Santa Barbara donated 122 works, mainly photographs and works on paper from 1993 to 2003. This gift included several Los Angeles artists, including Catherine Opie, John Baldessari, Diana Thater and Richard Hawkins. The Broads donations in the 2010s included works by Bill Jensen.

=== 2020s ===
In 2024, MOCA acquired 97 works by 54 artists. Additions included a five-panel painting by Silke Otto-Knapp, eight sculptures by Gilbert "Magú" Luján, and two paintings by Henry Taylor. The acquisitions also included Honor Titus's painting Victory is Divine and sculpture imagined court 001 (both 2023).

=== Gifts by Artists ===
Los Angeles-based artist Ed Moses made a major gift of his work to the museum in 1995, surveying nearly 40 years of his artistic development. In 2000, MOCA received gifts from artists themselves, including major pieces by sculptor and performance artist Paul McCarthy, video artist Doug Aitken and photographer Andreas Gursky.

== Exhibitions ==
Ever since it opened with an extensive exhibition called The First Show: Painting and Sculpture From Eight Collections, 1940–80, MOCA has been known for thematic-survey exhibitions about postwar art such as A Forest of Signs: Art in the Crisis of Representation (1989), A Minimal Future? Art as Object, 1958–1968 (1994), Reconsidering the Object of Art: 1965–1975 (1995), Hall of Mirrors: Art and Film since 1945 (1996), Out of Actions: Between Performance and the Object, 1949–1979 (1998), WACK! Art and the Feminist Revolution (2007), Art in the Streets (2011), Under the Big Black Sun: California Art 1974–1981 (2011), and Ends of the Earth: Land Art to 1974 (2012). The museum also organized the first major museum retrospectives of the work of Allen Ruppersberg (1985), John Baldessari (1990), Ad Reinhardt (1991), Jeff Wall (1997), Barbara Kruger (1999), and Takashi Murakami (2007). In addition there were also monographic shows like an ambitious installation by Robert Gober in 1997, or a revelatory survey of Sigmar Polke's photographic work in 1995. Since many of those shows traveled to New York and other cities in the U.S., like the show of Robert Rauschenberg combines that opened in Los Angeles in 2006, MOCA became known as "one of the greatest feeder museums in the country". In 2010, the museum canceled a planned retrospective of influential yet under-recognized artist Jack Goldstein to commission artist and director Julian Schnabel to curate a survey of works by actor, writer and artist Dennis Hopper, and in 2012, actor James Franco curated a tribute exhibition to James Dean, two projects that have been widely criticized for their emphasis on pop and celebrity culture. Of all solo shows on view over the period between January 2008 and December 2012, only about 28% were devoted to female artists.

Besides artists' retrospectives and art historical investigations, under chief curator Paul Schimmel, MOCA has mounted various multiartist theme shows on provocative or challenging topics. Helter Skelter: L.A. Art in the 1990s, a 1992 exhibition focused on the dark side of contemporary life as portrayed by artists like Mike Kelley, Paul McCarthy and Chris Burden, involving themes such as alienation, dispossession, and violence. Out of Actions: Between Performance and the Object, 1949–1979, a landmark historical survey presented in 1998, tracked the work of about 150 artists and collectives for whom public performances, in its links to painting, sculpture, dance and theater, and the creative process were far more important than well-crafted objects. Public Offerings, in 2001, explored the phenomenon of youthful creative energy in an overheated art world where stars are created before they leave art school. In ECSTASY: In and About Altered States (2005), some of the artists' works represented altered states of mind that they have experienced under the influence of drugs or hypnosis. WACK! Art and the Feminist Revolution, held in 2007, was the first major retrospective of art and the feminist revolution. MOCA hosted the LA Freewaves biennial festival, which exhibits a wide range of new media until the early 2000s.

In the 2020s, notable exhibitions have included Climate Change by Josh Kline and Monuments. ARTnews awarded the exhibition the 2026 Best Thematic Museum Exhibition Award.

== Locations ==
=== MOCA Grand Avenue ===
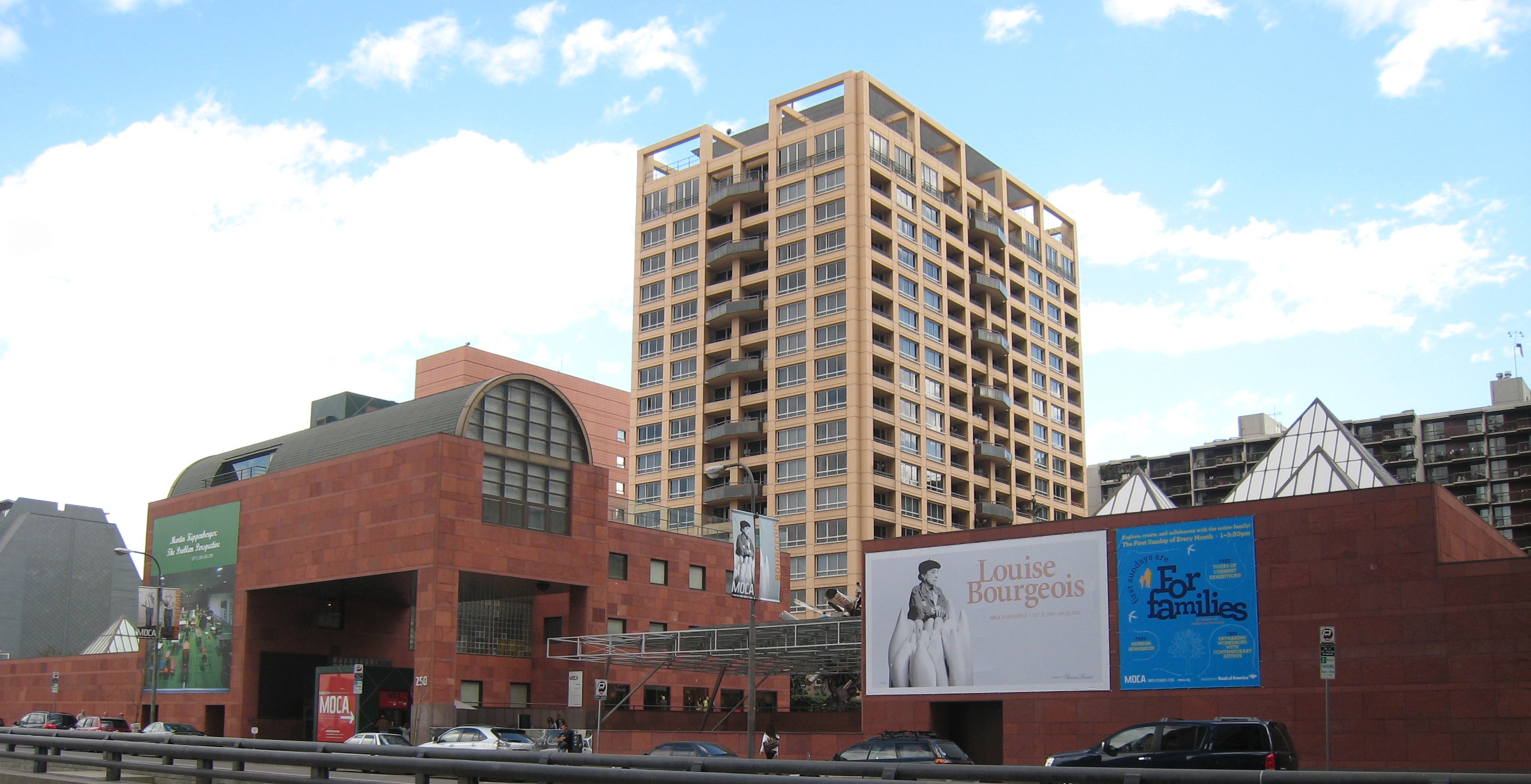
MOCA Grand Avenue

The MOCA Downtown Los Angeles location is home to almost 5,000 artworks created since 1940, including masterpieces by classic contemporary artists, and inspiring new works by emerging and mid-career artists from Southern California and around the world. The MOCA is the only museum in Los Angeles devoted exclusively to contemporary art.

In 1986, the celebrated Japanese architect Arata Isozaki, who had never worked on a project in the United States before, completed the downtown location's sandstone building to international critical and public acclaim, marking a dramatic achievement in the contemporary art world and heralding a new cultural era in Los Angeles. Its chief exhibition spaces are under the courtyard level, lit from above by groups of pyramidal skylights.

The construction and $23 million cost of the MOCA Grand Avenue building was part of a city-brokered deal with the developer of the $1 billion California Plaza redevelopment project on Bunker Hill, Bunker Hill Associates, who received the use of an 11.2-acre (45,000 m^{2}), publicly owned parcel of land. On the grounds that the law said that 1.5% of the construction costs of new buildings had to be spent on fine-arts embellishments, MOCA's board of trustees had struck a deal with the Community Redevelopment Agency to have the project developer build a 100,000-square-foot museum, designed by an architect of the trustees' choice, at no cost to the museum. In return for the free building, the agency required the trustees to raise $10 million for an operations endowment. Original plans had been for the building to open in time for the 1984 Summer Olympics. However, the project broke ground in 1983 and completed the museum, Omni Hotel and the first of two skyscrapers (One California Plaza) by 1986. The second skyscraper (Two California Plaza) was completed in 1992. Nancy Rubins' monumental stainless-steel sculpture "Mark Thompson's Airplane Parts" (2001), purchased by MOCA in honor of founding member Beatrice Gersh in 2002, was installed at the museum's plaza.

The Grand Avenue location is used to display pieces from MOCA's substantial permanent collection, especially artists who did much of their work between 1940 and 1980. There is also an extensive set of rooms used to display temporary exhibits, usually a major retrospective of an important artist, or works connected by a theme.

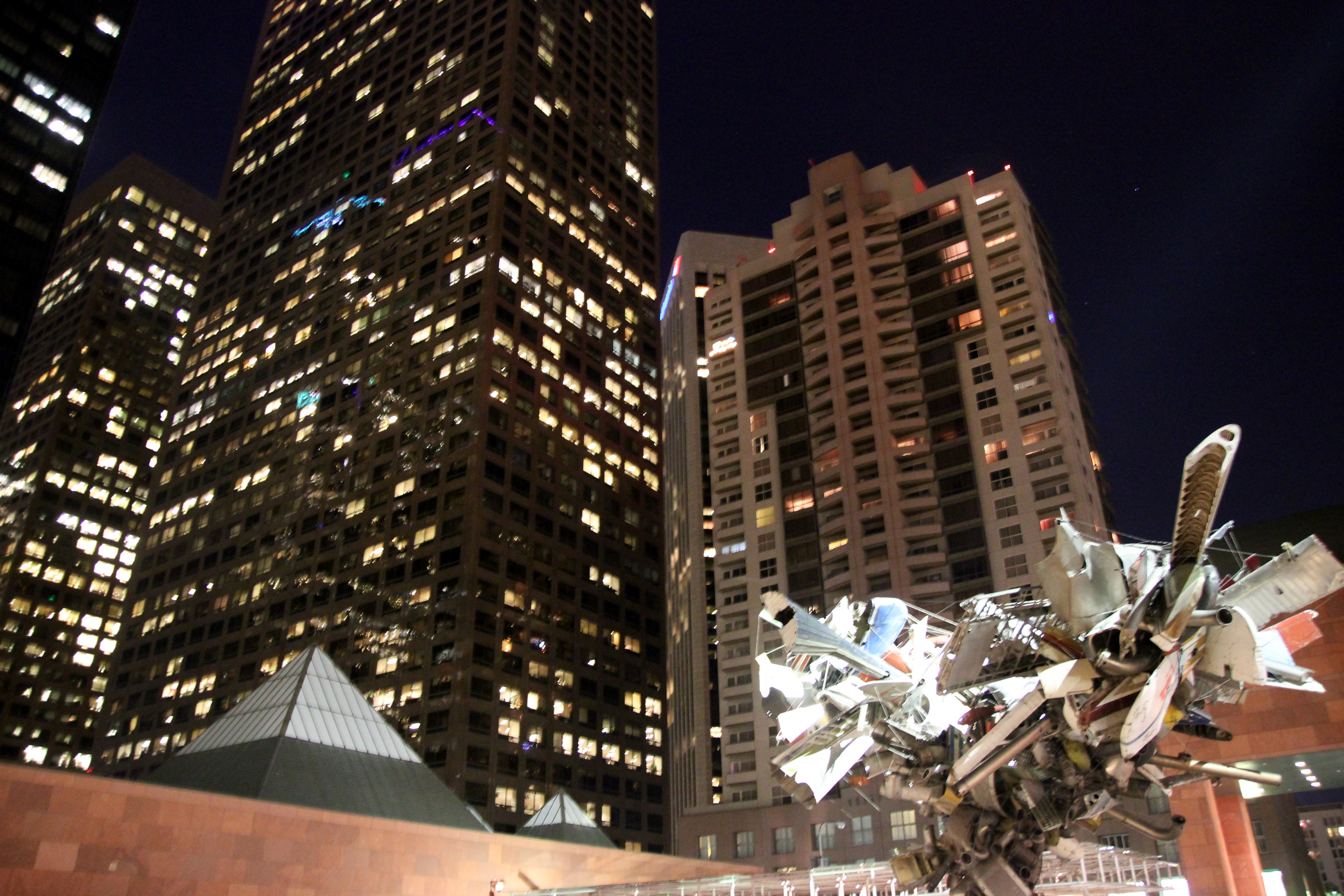
MOCA downtown buildings and Nancy Rubin's Airplane Parts sculpture

=== The Geffen Contemporary at MOCA ===
While the Grand Avenue facility was being planned and under construction, MOCA opened an interim exhibition space called the "Temporary Contemporary" in the fall of 1983. The new space was located at the edge of a warehouse district in which many Los Angeles artists worked at the time. On November 17, 1983, the museum inaugurated the building with a Shinto purification ceremony, a ritual often held at groundbreakings in Little Tokyo, as a symbol of mutual recognition between the Japanese community and the museum. The first public program was a commissioned collaboration, "Available Light" by Lucinda Childs, Frank O. Gehry, and John Adams followed in November 1983 by the inaugural exhibition, "The First Show: Painting and Sculpture from 1940–1980" curated by Julia Brown. The building had been originally constructed in the 1940s as a hardware store for local patrons and subsequently used as a city warehouse and police car garage, the "TC", as it became informally known, is leased from the city for five years for $1 a year.

Southern California architect Frank Gehry led the renovation of the Albert C. Martin, Sr.-designed 1947 Union Hardware buildings. Gehry left the exteriors intact, except for new entrance doors, and built a canopy of chain-link fencing and steel trusses over the closed-off street, to form a partially shaded plaza. There are two large, open gallery spaces, illuminated by industrial wire-glass skylights and a row of clerestory windows along the south wall. The intricate structural network of steel beams and supports has been left exposed, serving as support for the many movable display walls and lending a sculptural effect. A steel crane rail, left over from the building's hardware days, remained in place. The loading docks now serve as the lobby.

The Temporary Contemporary immediately captivated critics and museum patrons alike with its accessibility, informality and lack of pretension. Writing in The New York Times, John Russell referred to it as "a prince among spaces", and William Wilson of the Los Angeles Times wrote that it "instantly had the hospitable aura of a people's museum." The New York Times later wrote that "[m]ore than any event in recent decades, the Temporary (now known as the Geffen Contemporary) changed the cultural face of Los Angeles".

Due to the popularity of the Temporary Contemporary and extraordinary suitability of the building for exhibiting contemporary art, the museum's board requested that the City of Los Angeles extend MOCA's lease on the facility for 50 years, until 2038. That request was granted in early 1986, and in 1996 the city extended the lease even further. Also in 1996, MOCA received a $5-million gift from The David Geffen Foundation in support of the museum's endowment drive, and in recognition of this gift, the Temporary Contemporary was renamed The Geffen Contemporary at MOCA.

In 2019, MOCA received another $5-million gift from Wonmi and Kihong Kwon to transform the Geffen Contemporary with a cross-disciplinary series that will emphasize varied forms of performance but will also include experiential installations, concerts, screenings, readings, conventions and other events. It also will host artist residencies and rehearsals.

The 55,000-square-foot facility gives enormous latitude to artists and encourages experimentation. It is the largest of the MOCA locations and is ideally suited to large-scale sculptural works and conceptual, multi-media or electronic installations. It is typically used to display more recent works, often by lesser-known artists, and works which require a large amount of space. Some of these works are designed specifically for the Geffen Contemporary's space. In 2018, MOCA unveiled a Barbara Kruger mural, Untitled (Questions), on the Geffen exterior facing Temple Street and sponsored by Wonmi and Kihong Kwon.

In 2021, MOCA received one of the inaugural grants from the Frankenthaler Climate Initiative to support its solar energy project at the Geffen Contemporary.

=== MOCA at The Pacific Design Center ===
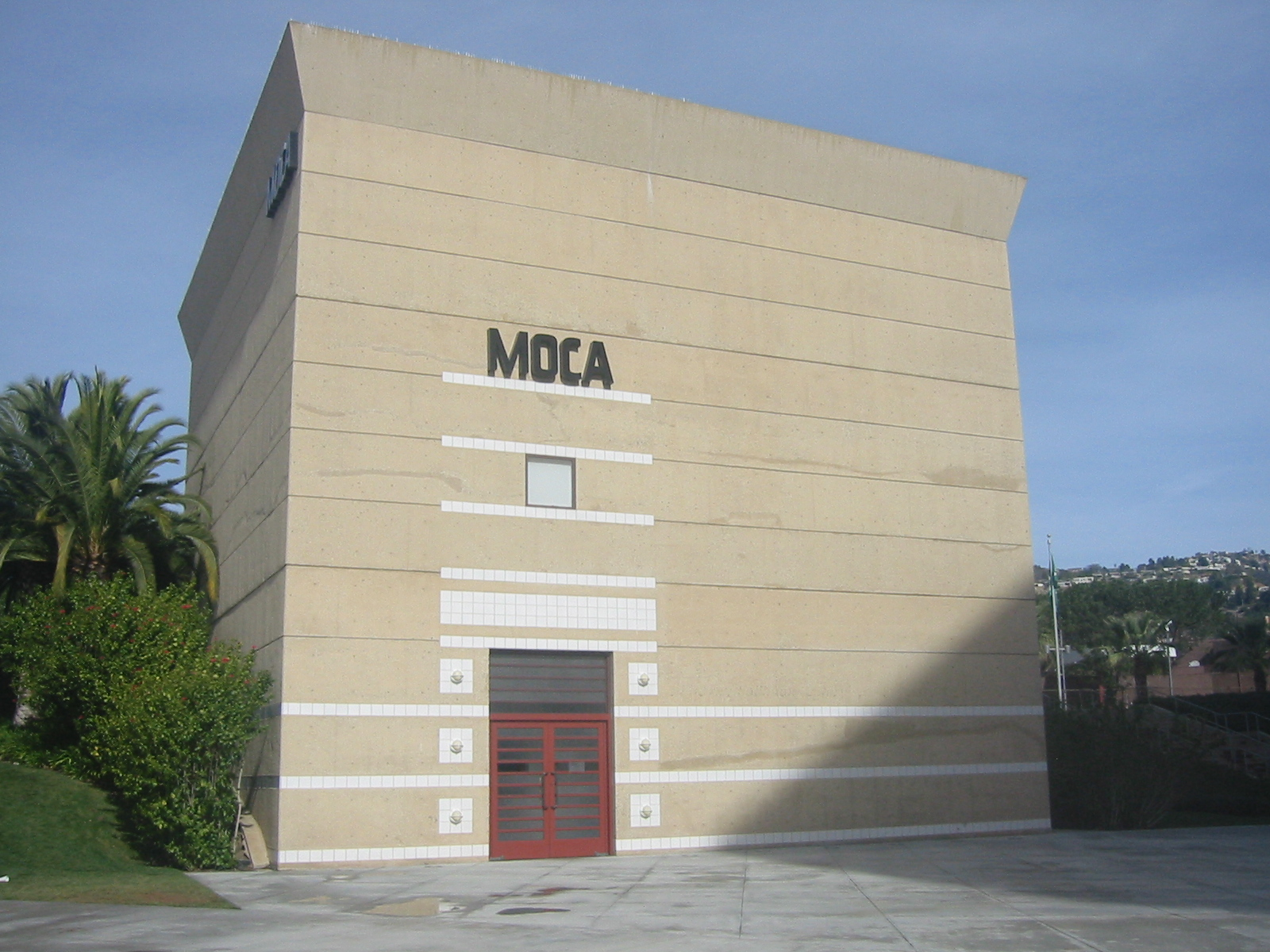
MOCA at the Pacific Design Center

From 2000 until 2019, MOCA maintained a 3,000 sq ft (280 m^{2}) exhibition space at the Pacific Design Center in West Hollywood to present new work by emerging and established artists as well as ancillary programs based upon its major exhibitions and renowned permanent collection. A focus was on design and architecture. The museum exhibited work by Takashi Murakami, Sterling Ruby, Catherine Opie, Kahlil Joseph and William Kentridge there, as well as by designers Rick Owens and Rodarte. MOCA also utilized the 384-seat PDC auditorium for a range of public programs.

== Programs ==
=== Sunday Studio ===
Sunday Studio is a MOCA program combining a gallery tour with hands-on art creation. It began in 2004 as a recurring event on the first Sunday of the month and in 2019, it changed to a quarterly event. Designed and taught by artists, the workshops are process-oriented and they frequently include activities in addition to the gallery tour, such as film, musical performance, or movement.

=== Big Family Day ===
Big Family Day was an annual spring event for all of MOCA's school and community partnership programs. Featuring student docents, entertainment, music, artmaking and a student art exhibition, this event usually attracted over 1,000 participants, including MOCA members, their families, and the community at large. The last Family Day was in 2022.

=== Teens of Contemporary Art (TOCA) ===
Teens of Contemporary Art is an open gathering of high school students interested in learning more about contemporary art with their peers. The group meets each month for exhibition explorations, art workshops, discussions about contemporary art, and events planning. An advisory council of teens identifies the topics and issues addressed at the monthly sessions. All TOCA participants get free admission to the museum.

TOCA events are the second Sunday of every month.

=== MOCA Apprenticeship Program (MAP) ===
Each year, the MOCA Apprenticeship Program (MAP) creates a supportive artistic community for a small, diverse group of high school students.

=== Engagement Party ===
Engagement Party (2008–2012) was a free public program that presented new work by emerging Southern California–based artists working collectively and collaboratively. The program offered artist collectives three-month residencies during which they presented public programs at MOCA Grand Avenue and the Geffen Contemporary at MOCA on the first Thursday of each month from 7 to 10pm. Collectives employed many different mediums, disciplines, and strategies during their residency, resulting in programs that included performances, workshops, screenings, lectures, and many other activities emerging from the group's particular focus.

Participating Artists: Finishing School, Knifeandfork (Brian House and Sue Huang), OJO, Slanguage, My Barbarian, Lucky Dragons, Ryan Heffington + the East Siders, and The League of Imaginary Scientists, Neighborhood Public Radio, The Los Angeles Urban Rangers, Liz Glynn, and CamLab.

== Awards ==
=== Women in the Arts ===
The Women in the Arts event, established in 1994 by the MOCA fundraising arm the MOCA Projects Council, is a benefit for MOCA's educational programs and generally draws more than 600 people from the fields of art, fashion, philanthropy, film and other areas of entertainment. The Award to Distinguished Women in the Arts recognizes women providing leadership and innovation in visual arts, dance, music and literature. Artist Jenny Holzer is one of the main females that has shown her work through textile and expressing her believes in the feminist art movement. Holzer art has changed over the years from making street posters, painted signs, paintings, photographs, to creating T-shirts for Willi Smith, and establishing a trend of LED signs. Holzers has been involved in many events and foundations such as, Dia Art Foundation, Time's Up movement, Social Strategies, Institute of Contemporary Arts, and many more. Holzer designed the bronze plaque, which features one of the artist's truisms: "It is in your self-interest to find a way to be very tender." Past recipients include collector Beatrice Gersh (1994), editor Tina Brown (1997), choreographer Twyla Tharp (1999), actress and director Anjelica Huston (2001), and artists Barbara Kruger (2001), Yoko Ono (2003), Jenny Holzer (2010), Annie Leibovitz (2012) and Marylin Minter (2015).

=== Eric and Wendy Schmidt Environment and Art Prize ===
First established in 2024, the Eric and Wendy Schmidt Environment and Art Prize – including $100,000 to be given directly to the artists, with materials and other supporting costs paid separately – will be awarded every two years until 2028, resulting in four prizes—the inaugural year having two recipients—with exhibitions into 2030. The recipients of the inaugural award were Julian Charrière and Cecilia Vicuña.

== Management ==
=== Director ===
The current director is Jonathan Abbot, who came from a successful career in public media at GBH in September 2026. The previous interim director had been Ann Goldstein, a senior curator at the museum. The museum has had six directors in the 18 years between 2008 and 2026.

In November 2021, Johanna Burton joined MOCA as the executive director, with Klaus Biesenbach shifting to the role of artistic director. Burton is formerly the director of the Wexner Center for the Arts in Columbus, Ohio. Prior to Johanna's arrival, Klaus Bisenbach departed MOCA to serve as director of the Neue Nationalgalerie in Berlin, Germany.

In July 2018, MoMA PS1 curator Klaus Biesenbach, was named as the new director of MOCA, following the abrupt resignation of Philippe Vergne. Vergne, formerly the director of the Dia Art Foundation in New York, began his tenure as MOCA's director in January 2014, and ended it amid a series of controversies, including the firing of chief curator Helen Molesworth.

Before Vergne, Maria Seferian served as interim director from September 2013 to March 2014, while the institution underwent the search for its next director. She has been counsel to the museum since 2008. The New York art dealer and curator Jeffrey Deitch served as director of MOCA from June 1, 2010, through September 1, 2013. On July 24, 2013, he told the board of his decision to leave. Deitch experienced a measure of controversy for his clash with Paul Schimmel, the museum's then-chief curator. The board's firing of Schimmel on June 28, 2012, was met with criticism from the community.

Between 1999 and 2008, Jeremy Strick led the institution. He resigned amid significant financial and legal turmoil. Before that, Richard Koshalek served as director, deputy director and chief curator from 1980 to 1999. Pontus Hultén was founding director between 1980 and 1982.

=== Board of trustees ===
As of May 2026, MOCA's board is headed by philanthropist Carolyn Clark Powers. Other board members are mostly philanthropists with some artists. The current Mayor of Los Angeles and President of the Los Angeles City Council, and the museum director are ex-officio members; their presence on the board is a condition for MOCA's long-term $1 a year lease on the Geffen Contemporary building. In accordance with a policy enacted in 1993, trustees serve three-year, renewable terms and rotate off after six years; they are generally invited to return after one year.

Current artists on the board include Barbara Kruger, Tala Madani, Rodney McMillian, and Christina Quarles. Other notable people currently on the board include tech entrepreneur Sean Parker and producer Jeffrey Sorors, who is President Emeritus (past president).

Previous board members have included Guess co-founder Maurice Marciano, Lilly Tartikoff Karatz, Lillian P. Lovelace, Clifford J. Einstein and David G. Johnson; Dallas Price-Van Breda and Jeffrey Soros, Wallis Annenberg, Gabriel Brener, Steven A. Cohen, Charles L. Conlan II, Kathi B. Cypres, Laurent Degryse, Ariel Emanuel, Susan Gersh, Aileen Getty, Nancy Jane F. Goldston, Laurence Graff, Bruce Karatz, Wonmi Kwon, Daniel S. Loeb, Mary Klaus Martin, Jamie McCourt, Edward J. Minskoff, former Trump Treasury Secretary Steven T. Mnuchin, Hard Rock Cafe Founder Peter Morton, Heather Podesta, Steven F. Roth, Carla Sands, Chara Schreyer, Adam Sender, Sutton Stracke, Cathy Vedovi, Christopher Walker, Orna Amir Wolens.

Artists sitting on MOCA's board have included John Baldessari, Catherine Opie, Mark Grotjahn, Mark Bradford and Lari Pittman. Life trustees include MOCA's founding chairman Eli Broad as well as Betye Monell Burton, Blake Byrne, Lenore S. Greenberg, Audrey Irmas, Frederick M. Nicholas and Thomas E. Unterman.

Despite the addition of wealthy art collectors to the board following the museum's financial troubles that began in 2008, contributions and grants to the museum fell in 2012, and in this same time period, Broad missed two quarters of payments of the money he promised MOCA. All of the artist members of the board—John Baldessari, Barbara Kruger, Catherine Opie and Ed Ruscha—resigned later that year, in response to developments at the museum under the leadership of Jeffrey Deitch, including the termination of senior curator Paul Schimmel.

In 2014, Baldessari, Kruger and Opie resumed their positions on the MOCA board. Also, fellow artists Mark Grotjahn and Mark Bradford were elected to MOCA's board over the course of 2014; Lari Pittman was added in August 2016.

=== Funding ===
Unlike the Los Angeles County Museum of Art, which is partly controlled by the county, MOCA receives minimal government funding and does not have a steady source of funds. For the year ending June 30, 2024, MOCA reported total revenue of $23.6 million and net assets of $213.2 million. It relies on donors to pay about 80% of its expenses. MOCA's budget for the fiscal year 2011 was $14.3 million, the museum's lowest spending since the 1990s. In 2011, the museum reported net assets (basically, a total of all the resources it has on its books, except the value of the art) of $38 million.

In December 2008, during the world financial meltdown, newspapers reported that the museum's endowment, which partly depended on stock investments, had dropped and that museum had fiscal problems Partly in violation of state law, the museum lost $44 million of their $50 million endowment over nine years, Deficits mounted at the rate of $2.8 million a year on average from mid-2000 to mid-2008. Amid speculation that the museum may close its doors, deaccession artworks, and/or merge with another institution, a grassroots, artist-led organization called MOCA Mobilization petitioned for MOCA to remain independent and keep its collection intact.

The Attorney General's office, led at the time by a person to whom Eli Broad had been a campaign contributor, investigated MOCA. In April 2010, an assistant attorney general issued a letter that, according to the Los Angeles times, stated that “'unreasonably enthusiastic expectations' about revenues on the part of the museum's management led MOCA to overspend. Because the museum depends mainly on gifts, that translates to hoped-for big donations that never materialized. Moreover,...the board apparently did not learn of annual deficits until it was too late to act. Instead of reducing spending, MOCA paid some of its bills with money from endowments that donors had earmarked for other purposes...[and] the law requires either that nonprofits get written permission from donors before using restricted endowments in other ways, or that they obtain court orders overriding the restrictions. 'The withdrawals [the AG's office]reviewed did not follow this standard." Ultimately, although the investigation was closed with no disciplinary action (Board members were asked to take a voluntary training in their fiduciary duties and MOCA was required to bring in a consultant to come up with newer and better financial reporting procedures), just the report of the investigation in the Los Angeles Times had an enormous impact – donors fled and the trustees, in the maelstrom, accepted Broad's terms for control of the institution in exchange for his promise to donate money. Broad, MOCA's founding chairman from 1979 to 1984 and life trustee of the museum, offered $30 million in a staggered donation, $15 million as matching donations. An agreement with Broad was tentatively reached on December 18, but another possibility—a merger with the Los Angeles County Museum of Art—had not been ruled out. On December 23, the museum announced that it had accepted Broad's offer and would be making a number of significant changes to its leadership. Director Jeremy Strick resigned, and a new position of chief executive officer was created for Charles E. Young, former chancellor of the University of California, Los Angeles. Broad required compliance with strict financial terms, but did not demand Strick's resignation or Young's appointment as a condition. Hired for a limited term, Young oversaw layoffs and cutbacks in the exhibition schedule that reduced MOCA's budget from more than $24 million to less than the $16 million in 2011. In a departure from past practice, when MOCA would schedule shows before funding had been secured, it has adopted a policy of committing to exhibitions only after at least 80% of its projected budget has been lined up.

The departure of respected curator Paul Schimmel on June 28, 2012, led to an exodus of trustees, committee members and a bombardment of criticism in the community. And because Broad himself defaulted on promised payments to MOCA that expired in 2013 the viability of the institution came into question. In 2012, the Museum of Contemporary Art and the private University of Southern California were in talks about a possible partnership, but as of 2026, this did not come to pass.

In a first for MOCA, a two-day Sotheby's auction of donated works by artists in May 2015 raised $22.5 million for the museum endowment; the sale included works by Mark Grotjahn, Takashi Murakami and Ed Ruscha.

=== Attendance ===
MOCA exhibitions draw roughly 60% of their visitors from the L.A. area; their attendance totaled 236,104 in 2010, up by 89,000 over the previous year.

== See also ==
- Effects of the Great Recession on museums
- Joel Wachs, Los Angeles City Council member honored with Joel Wachs Square near the museum
