= Suspicion Breeds Confidence =

- Origin: Germany
- Genres: Electronic music, Experimental, IDM, glitch, ambient, industrial
- Years active: 1996–present
- Labels: Gruenrekorder
- Members: Tobias Schmitt
- Website: http://www.acrylnimbus.de

Suspicion Breeds Confidence is a German electronic music project of Tobias Schmitt. Tomislav Bucalic and Aidan Mark appear frequently on the recordings and join the live performances. They derive their name from one of the totalitarian slogans from Terry Gilliam's film Brazil.

== Discography ==
=== Albums ===
- 1999: Déjà Vu Of A Duck
- 1999: Eight Reasons For Being Pathetic
- 2001: Nyugodt
- 2001: Phager Incallidus (Exhibitionismus XI)
- 2008: The Fauna And Flora Of The Vatican City

=== Singles ===
- 2004: Schmalz
