= Carolyn Clark Powers =

Carolyn Clark Powers is a Los Angeles philanthropist.

She is currently chair of the Board of Trustees at the Museum of Contemporary Art, Los Angeles.

== Early life ==
Powers was raised in Tulsa, Oklahoma. Her roots trace back to the Dockery Plantation (now called Dockery Farms) in Mississippi., a timber and cotton plantation founded in 1895 that is widely considered to be the birthplace of Delta blues music. Powers helped to establish and serves on the board of the Dockery Farms Foundation.

== Museum of Contemporary Art, Los Angeles ==
In May 2019, Powers, then a board member wrestling with the aftermath of significant financial problems at the museum, pledged a gift of $10 million per year for five years so admission to MOCA could be free. Free admission began in 2020. At the time, Powers said “Charging admission is counterintuitive to art’s ability and purpose to connect, inspire, and heal people.” In 2025, she made another gift to continue the program.

Powers donated to the campaign of Donald J. Trump and the Republican National Committee in 2018, which was noted in the art press as incongruous for a leader of a contemporary art museum in Los Angeles, due to Trump showing little interest in funding the arts.
