= Knifeandfork =

American new media art duo

Knifeandfork is an artist duo formed in 2004 by American artists Brian House and Sue Huang. Knifeandfork projects are concerned with the critical reconfiguration of media structures and contexts. The group is known for their unconventional combination of social practice and new media.

Their projects include Hundekopf (2005), an SMS-based locative media artwork staged on Berlin's Ringbahn, and MOCA Grand Prix (2009), produced during a residency at the Museum of Contemporary Art, Los Angeles.

Knifeandfork work has been shown at the Museum of Contemporary Art, Los Angeles in 2009 under the Engagement Party program, the Beall Center for Art + Technology at the University of California, Irvine, and the Kulturhuset, Stockholm. Knifeandfork received a 2008 commission from Rhizome.
