= Wendy Hui Kyong Chun =

Canadian media professor

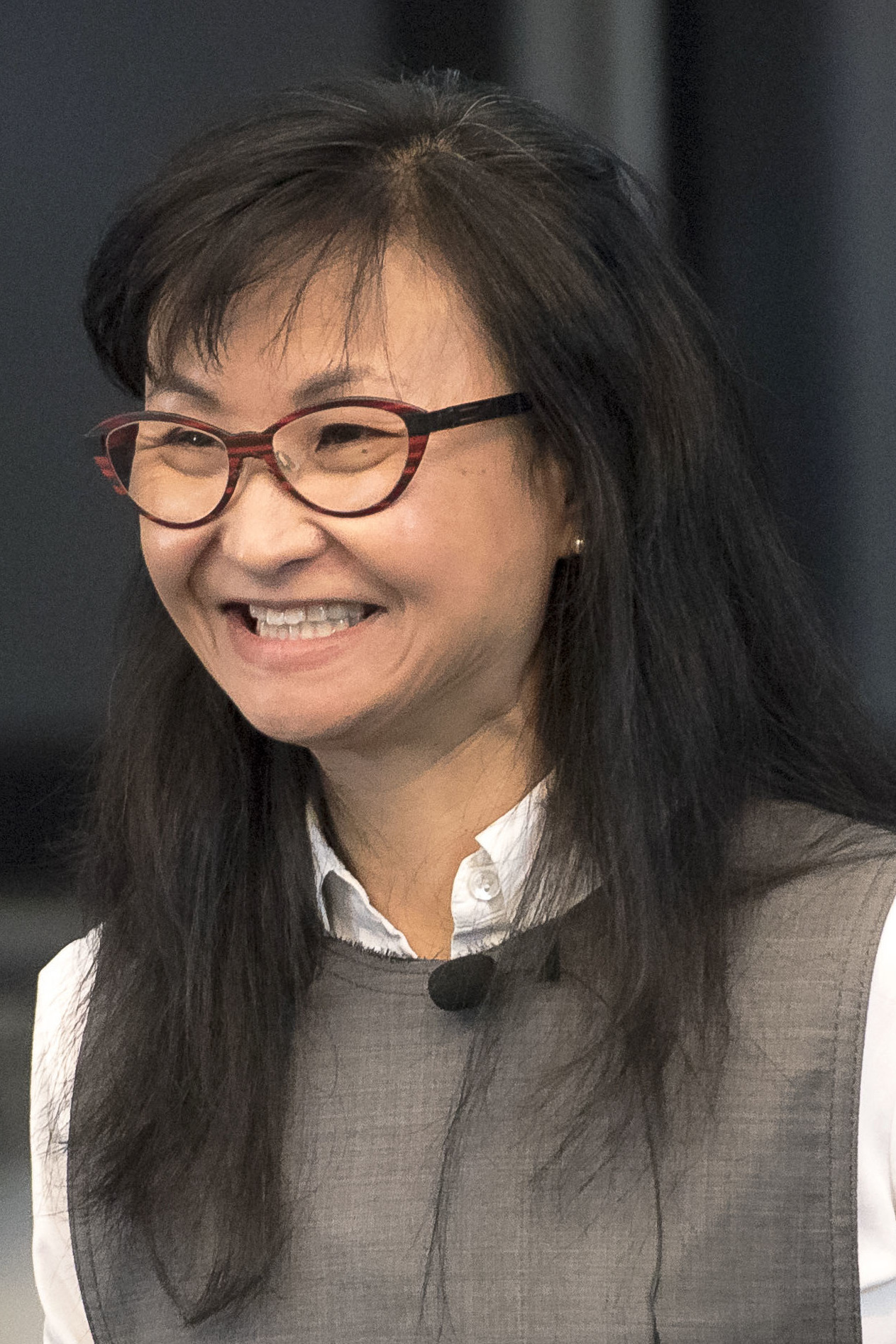
- Chun in 2017
- Born: 1969 (age 56–57)
- Education: University of Waterloo; Princeton University

Wendy Hui Kyong Chun (born 1969) is the Canada 150 Research Chair in New Media in the School of Communication at Simon Fraser University. She is the founding Director of the Digital Democracies Institute at Simon Fraser University, established in 2020. Previously, she was Professor and Chair of Modern Culture and Media at Brown University. Her theoretical and critical approach to digital media draws from her training in both Systems Design Engineering and English Literature.

She is the author of several books, including Discriminating Data: Correlation, Neighborhoods, and the New Politics of Recognition (MIT Press, 2021), as well as a trilogy that includes Updating to Remain the Same: Habitual New Media (MIT Press, 2016), Programmed Visions: Software and Memory (MIT Press, 2011), and Control and Freedom: Power and Paranoia in the Age of Fiber Optics (MIT Press, 2006). She has also written articles and co-edited collections pertaining to the digital media field.

Her research spans the fields of digital media, new media, software studies, comparative media studies, critical race studies, and critical theory. In 2022 she joined the editorial board for the relaunched Software Studies series from MIT Press. She has served on the Canadian Commission on Democratic Expression.

== Career ==
Chun holds a B.S. in Systems Design Engineering and English Literature from the University of Waterloo (1992) and a Ph.D. in English from Princeton University.

She is a Royal Society of Canada Fellow (2022), Guggenheim Fellow (2017), American Academy in Berlin Holtzbrinck Fellow (2017), and ACLS Fellow (2016). She has been a member of the Institute for Advanced Study in Princeton, NJ, a fellow at Harvard's Radcliffe Institute for Advanced Study, and Wriston Fellow at Brown University.

Chun has been the Velux Visiting Professor of Management, Politics, and Philosophy at the Copenhagen Business School (2015–16), the Wayne Morse Chair for Law and Politics at the University of Oregon (2014–15), Leuphana University (Germany, 2013–14), Gerald LeBoff Visiting Scholar at NYU (2014), as well as a visiting professor at the University of St. Gallen (Switzerland, 2014), the Folger Institute (2013), a visiting scholar in the Annenberg School of Communications at the University of Pennsylvania (2018), and a visiting associate professor in Harvard's History of Science Department.

== Work and influence ==
Chun's work has both set and questioned the terms of theory and criticism in new and digital media studies.

In 2004, she co-edited Old Media, New Media: A History and Theory Reader with Thomas Keenan. Chun's introduction to the book is skeptical of the phrase "new media" and the emerging area of study it named, starting in the early 1990s. In the essay "On Software, or the Persistence of Visual Knowledge" in The visual culture reader, Chun links the emergence of software to shifts in labor that replaced the feminized function of the "computer" in science labs with the electronic computer. In the 1940s, early computers such as the ENIAC were largely programmed by women, under the direction of primarily male managers. As programming was professionalized, this work, that had been viewed as clerical, "sought to become an engineering and academic field in its own right". The professionalization of programming grew as successive layers of code distanced programmers from machine language, eventually allowing for software to exist separate from the programmer as a commodity that could travel between machines. Women's work as the first computer programmers was, by contrast, closer to the physical machine, and potentially more difficult.

Chun's first book, Control and Freedom: Power and Paranoia in the Age of Fiber Optics (2006) deconstructs the promises by which the early Internet, "one of the most compromising media to date" (p. 144), was sold as an empowering technology of freedom. Control and Freedom: Power and Paranoia in the Age of Fiber Optics (2006) explores how freedom has become inextricable from control and how this conflation undermines the democratic potential of the Internet. Chun's work uses different approaches to analyze the relationship between control and freedom, those include, the freedom that the internet enables contrasted with the paranoia and control the technology can have over us, the link between software and networks, and societies expectations of technology. The book draws on a wide variety of texts—U.S. Court decisions on cyberporn, hardware specifications, software interfaces, cyberpunk novels—to examine how digital technologies remap forms of social control and produce new experiences of race and sexuality.

Her second book, Programmed Visions: Software and Memory (2011), Chun argues that cycles of obsolescence and renewal (e.g. mobile mobs, Web 3.0, cloud computing) are byproducts of new media's logic of "programmability". The book asks how computers have become organizing metaphors for understanding our neoliberal, networked moment. Seb Franklin notes that through the methodology that Chun developed in Control and Freedom "archives of critical theory and the history of technology meet close analyses of software and hardware rooted in Chun's training as a systems design engineer." This is further refined and extended in Programmed Visions, examining in detail the ways in which software and governmentality are intertwined, both historically and logically.

Casey Gollan writes in a review of Programmed Visions for Rhizome, "'programmability,' the logic of computers, has come to reach beyond screens into both the systems of government and economics and the metaphors we use to make sense of the world. "Without [computers, human and mechanical]," writes Chun, "there would be no government, no corporations, no schools, no global marketplace, or, at the very least, they would be difficult to operate...Computers, understood as networked software and hardware machines, are—or perhaps more precisely set the grounds for—neoliberal governmental technologies...not simply through the problems (population genetics, bioinformatics, nuclear weapons, state welfare, and climate) they make it possible to both pose and solve, but also through their very logos, their embodiment of logic."

In Updating to Remain the Same: Habitual New Media (2016), Chun argues that "our media matter most when they seem not to matter at all". When they are no longer new but habitual, they become automatic and unconscious. Chun speaks of what she refers to as "creepy" instruments of social habituation they are nonetheless also sold as deeply personal, marking the distinction between public and private, memory and storage, individual action and social control. Chun's book moves forward from her other books and proposes a theory regarding habituation. The book deals with notions of new media and how people reorient themselves as new media continues to update. Zara Dinen's review of Chun frames the book into two important sections, the first regarding the imagined potential and the networks that make up the internet and the second section dealing with what Chun refers to as the "YOU's" that make up the internet.

A recent work by Chun proposes the term "net-munity" to discuss the COVID-19 pandemic and the meaning of neighbor and community during times of uncertainty. Through her explanation of "net-munity" she describes the notions of neighborly and social responsibility through the lens of the COVID-19 pandemic and how contact tracing has displayed interesting notions of community and responsibility.

== Selected works ==
- New Media, Old Media: A History and Theory Reader (co-edited with Thomas Keenan, Routledge, 2005)
- Control and Freedom: Power and Paranoia in the Age of Fiber Optics (MIT Press, 2006)
- Programmed Visions: Software and Memory (MIT Press, 2013)
- New Media, Old Media: A History and Theory Reader, 2nd edition (co-edited with Anna Watkins Fisher and Thomas Keenan, Routledge, 2015)
- Updating to Remain the Same: Habitual New Media (MIT Press, 2016)
- Discriminating Data: Correlation, Neighborhoods, and the New Politics of Recognition (MIT Press, 2021)

Chun also co-edited several journal special issues:

- "New Media and American Literature," American Literature (with Tara McPherson and Patrick Jagoda, 2013)
- "Race and/as Technology," Camera Obscura (with Lynne Joyrich, 2009)
