= Gruenrekorder =

German record label for field recording, soundscapes and sound art

- Founded: 2003
- Founder: Lasse-Marc Riek and Roland Etzin
- Genre: Field Recording, Soundscapes, Sound Art
- Country of origin: Germany
- Location: Frankfurt and Hanau
- Official website: gruenrekorder.de

Gruenrekorder is a German record label for field recording, soundscapes and sound art. It was founded in 2003 by the sound artists Lasse-Marc Riek and Roland Etzin in Frankfurt am Main, Germany. The releases are mainly published on CD and Vinyl, but they are also distributed on Tape as well as in digital formats (USB-Card USB flash drives, WAV/MP3/FLAC). Although the focus lies on field recordings and soundscapes, the spectrum of the label also includes compilations and crossover projects up to the genre of New Music.

The label’s work output is not limited to the publication of sounds and music. It expands towards the field of working with and understanding of sound and phonography in general. Roland Etzin and Lasse-Marc Riek also operate as activists and artists in an international network and collaborate with different communities, organisations, scientists, authors and artists in various contexts.

The label is also involved in other projects and cooperations and hosts various events and mediation formats including concerts, workshops and lectures.

Gruenrekorder publishes a free bi-lingual online magazine called "Field notes", which contains essays, interviews and other texts which deal with the phenomenon of sound from scientific, philosophical and ecological perspectives.

In 2009, the Gruenrekorder compilation "Autumn Leaves" won the Qwartz Electronic Music Awards.

== Artists ==
- Rodolphe Alexis (FR)
- Gilles Aubry (CH)
- Andreas Bick (GER)
- Hafdís Bjarnadóttir (IS)
- Daniel Blinkhorn (AUS)
- Angus Carlyle (UK)
- Budhaditya Chattopadhyay (IND)
- Peter Cusack (UK)
- Yannick Dauby (FR)
- Korhan Erel (TR)
- Ernst Karel (US)
- Christina Kubisch (GER)
- Christoph Korn (GER)
- Peter Kutin (A)
- Tom Lawrence (IRL)
- Mark Lorenz Kysela (GER)
- David Michael (US)
- Olivier Nijs (NL)
- Pauline Oliveros (US)
- Andrea Polli (US)
- Cédric Peyronnet (FR)
- Pietro Riparbelli (I)
- David Rothenberg (US)
- Louis Sarno (US)
- Suspicion Breeds Confidence (GER)
- Walter Tilgner (GER)
- Mirko Uhlig (GER)
- Heike Vester (GER)
- Antje Vowinckel (GER)
- Manfred Waffender (GER)
- Eisuke Yanagisawa (JP)
- Achim Zepezauer (GER)
- Annea Lockwood (US / NZ)
- Arturas Bumšteinas (LT)
