= Verdant Works =

Museum in Dundee, Scotland

Coordinates: 56.4617°N 2.9834°W

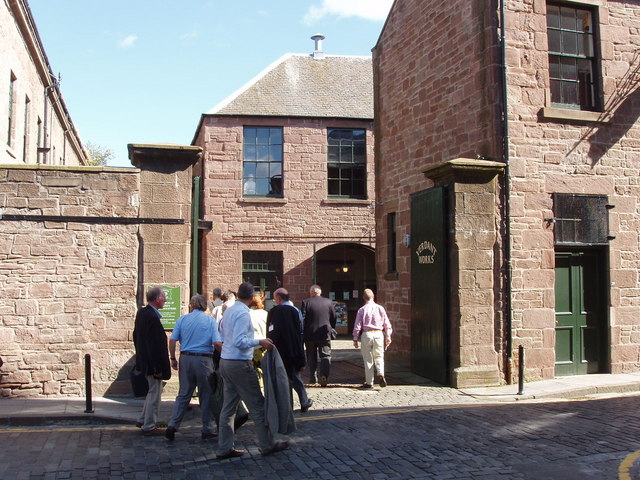
- Entrance to Verdant Works
- Established: 16 September 1996
- Location: West Henderson's Wynd, Blackness, Dundee, Scotland
- Owner: Dundee Heritage Trust
- Website: Verdant Works

Verdant Works, also known as Scotland's Jute Museum, is a former jute mill in the Blackness area of Dundee, Scotland. It was purchased in 1991 by the Dundee Heritage Trust. The trust restored the buildings, which were officially opened by Prince Charles on 16 September 1996, as a museum dedicated to the textile industry, an industry that once dominated the city's economy.

== Building ==
The Verdant Works was given Category A listed building status by Historic Scotland in 1987. This is the highest category for listing in Scotland, denoting a building of national architectural importance. It is a rare surviving example of a courtyard-type mill, with its original building layout and many original features remaining. It is one of a declining number of industrial premises in Dundee and east-central Scotland remaining little-changed from the 19th century.

== History ==
The mill was named Verdant Works because of the nature that surrounded it. It was built in 1833 for the flax spinner and merchant David Lindsay.

The oldest part of Verdant Works is the High Mill. It could hold hundreds of workers at a time. Warehouses, batching areas and offices were added to the site by 1863. In 1884, the Verdant Works had three steam engines which powered 70 power looms with 2,800 spindles. The engines were powered by the Scouring Burn.

== Museum ==
The Verdant Works are the only dedicated jute museum in the United Kingdom. As a museum, the Verdant Works tell the story of Dundee's textile industries, focusing primarily on the jute and linen industries. The production of textiles was the dominant industry in Dundee for many years, directly employing 50,000 people in the city (half the working population) by the end of the 19th century, as well as many more thousands in associated trades such as shipbuilding, transportation, and engineering. At the time Dundee supplied the majority of the world's demand for jute products, meaning it was also of importance for both Scottish and British histories.

The jute collections cover the entire history of the jute industry. It covers topics such as manufacturing, research and development, end products, quality control, textile engineering, the industry's Indian connections, and the lives of the workers. Objects include machinery patterns, jute and flax products, small tools, technical drawings, plans, and quality control and testing equipment.

The archives and photographic records of various mills and their workers have considerable historical research value. As well as the large machinery objects, the collections cover the fields of industrial history, social history, fine art, archives, business papers, photographs, costumes, and numismatics.

Verdant Works is a fully accredited museum and has won numerous awards, both national and international, as well as being a 5-star-rated tourist attraction with VisitScotland. In 2008, the Jute Collection was named as a Recognised Collection of National Significance.

In September 2015, a new section of the museum was opened in the High Mill, after an extensive restoration of this building. The High Mill was built in 1833, and is the oldest part of the complex. The project to conserve the High Mill and convert it into an open gallery was partly funded by the Heritage Lottery Fund.
