= Marwencol =

Marwencol could refer to:

- Marwencol (art installation), a WWII-themed miniature town in Kingston, New York, created by outsider artist Mark Hogancamp
- Marwencol (film), a 2010 documentary film directed by Jeff Malmberg about Hogancamp and his miniature town

== See also ==
- Welcome to Marwen, a 2018 drama film directed by Robert Zemeckis, based on the experiences of Mark Hogancamp
