= 17th Visual Effects Society Awards =

US film and TV awards ceremony in 2019

17th Visual Effects Society Awards

February 5, 2019

Best Visual Effects in a Visual Effects Driven Motion Picture:
Avengers: Infinity War

Best Visual Effects in a Photoreal Episode:
Lost in Space – Danger, Will Robinson

The 17th Visual Effects Society Awards was an awards ceremony held by the Visual Effects Society, honoring the best visual effects in film and television of 2018. Nominations were announced on January 15, 2019, and the ceremony took place on February 5, 2019, hosted by Patton Oswalt.

== Nominees ==
=== Honorary Awards ===
Lifetime Achievement Award:

- Chris Meledandri

VES Visionary Award:

- Jonathan Nolan

VES Award for Creative Excellence

- David Benioff and D. B. Weiss

=== Film ===
Outstanding Visual Effects in a Photoreal Feature	Outstanding Supporting Visual Effects in a Photoreal Feature
Avengers: Infinity War – Daniel DeLeeuw, Jen Underdahl, Kelly Port, Matt Aitken, Dan Sudick: Christopher Robin – Chris Lawrence, Steve Gaub, Michael Eames, Glenn Melenhorst, Chris Corbould; Ready Player One – Roger Guyett, Jennifer Meislohn, Dave Shirk, Matthew Butler, Neil Corbould; Solo: A Star Wars Story – Rob Bredow, Erin Dusseault, Matt Shumway, Patrick Tubach, Dominic Tuohy; Welcome to Marwen – Kevin Baillie, Sandra Scott, Seth Hill, Marc Chu, James Paradis	First Man - Paul Lambert, Kevin Elam, Tristan Myles, Ian Hunter, JD Schwalm: 12 Strong - Roger Nall, Robert Weaver, Mike Meinardus; Bird Box - Marcus Taormina, David Robinson, Mark Bakowski, Sophie Dawes, Mike Meinardus; Bohemian Rhapsody - Paul Norris, Tim Field, May Leung, Andrew Simmonds; Outlaw King - Alex Bicknell, Dan Bethell, Greg O’Connor, Stefano Pepin
Outstanding Visual Effects in an Animated Feature	Outstanding Animated Character in a Photoreal Feature
Spider-Man: Into the Spider-Verse - Joshua Beveridge, Christian Hejnal, Danny Dimian, Bret St. Clair: Dr. Seuss' The Grinch - Pierre Leduc, Janet Healy, Bruno Chauffard, Milo Riccarand; Incredibles 2 - Brad Bird, John Walker, Rick Sayre, Bill Watral; Isle of Dogs - Mark Waring, Jeremy Dawson, Tim Ledbury, Lev Kolobov; Ralph Breaks the Internet - Scott Kersavage, Bradford Simonsen, Ernest J. Petti, Cory Loftis	Avengers: Infinity War - Thanos - Jan Philip Cramer, Darren Hendler, Paul Story, Sidney Kombo-Kintombo: Christopher Robin - Tigger - Arslan Elver, Kayn Garcia, Laurent Laban, Mariano Mendiburu; Jurassic World: Fallen Kingdom - Indoraptor - Jance Rubinchik, Ted Lister, Yannick Gillain, Keith Ribbons; Ready Player One - Art3mis - Dave Shirk, Brian Cantwell, Jung-Seung Hong, Kim Ooi
Outstanding Animated Character in an Animated Feature	Outstanding Created Environment in a Photoreal Feature
Spider-Man: Into the Spider-Verse - Miles Morales - Marcos Kang, Chad Belteau, Humberto Rosa, Julie Bernier Gosselin: Dr. Seuss' The Grinch - The Grinch - David Galante, Francois Boudaille, Olivier Luffin, Yarrow Cheney; Incredibles 2 - Helen Parr - Michal Makarewicz, Ben Porter, Edgar Rodriguez, Kevin Singleton; Ralph Breaks the Internet - Ralphzilla - Dong Joo Byun, Dave K. Komorowski, Justin Sklar, Le Joyce Tong	Ready Player One - Overlook Hotel - Mert Yamak, Stanley Wong, Joana Garrido, Daniel Gagiu: Ant-Man and the Wasp - Journey to the Quantum Realm - Florian Witzel, Harsh Mistri, Yuri Serizawa, Can Yuksel; Aquaman - Atlantis - Quentin Marmier, Aaron Barr, Jeffrey De Guzman, Ziad Shureih; Solo: A Star Wars Story - Vandor Planet - Julian Foddy, Christoph Ammann, Clement Gerard, Pontus Albrecht
Outstanding Created Environment in an Animated Feature	Outstanding Virtual Cinematography in a Photoreal Project
Spider-Man: Into the Spider-Verse - Graphic New York City - Terry Park, Bret St. Clair, Kimberly Liptrap, Dave Morehead: Dr. Seuss' The Grinch - Whoville - Loic Rastout, Ludovic Ramiere, Henri Deruer, Nicolas Brack; Incredibles 2 - Parr House - Christopher M. Burrows, Philip Metschan, Michael Rutter, Joshua West; Ralph Breaks the Internet - Social Media District - Benjamin Min Huang, Jon Kim Krummel II, Gina Warr Lawes, Matthias Lechner	Ready Player One - New York Race - Daniele Bigi, Edmund Kolloen, Mathieu Vig, Jean-Baptiste Noyau: Aquaman - Third Act Battle - Claus Pedersen, Mohammad Rastkar, Cedric Lo, Ryan McCoy; Echo - Time Displacement - Victor Perez, Tomas Tjernberg, Tomas Wall, Marcus Dineen; Jurassic World: Fallen Kingdom - Gyrosphere Escape - Pawl Fulker, Matt Perrin, Oscar Faura, David Vickery; Welcome to Marwen - Town of Marwen - C. Kim Miles, Matthew Ward, Ryan Beagan, Marc Chu
Outstanding Model in a Photoreal or Animated Project	Outstanding Effects Simulations in a Photoreal Feature
Mortal Engines - London - Matthew Sandoval, James Ogle, Nick Keller, Sam Tack: Avengers: Infinity War - Nidavellir Forge Megastructure - Chad Roen, Ryan Rogers, Jeff Tetzlaff, Ming Pan; Incredibles 2 - Underminer Vehicle - Neil Blevins, Philip Metschan, Kevin Singleton; Ready Player One - DeLorean DMC-12 - Giuseppe Laterza, Kim Lindqvist, Mauro Giacomazzo, William Gallyo; Solo: A Star Wars Story - Millennium Falcon - Masa Narita, Steve Walton, David Meny, James Clyne	Avengers: Infinity War - Titan - Gerardo Aguilera, Ashraf Ghoniem, Vasilis Pazionis, Hartwell Durfor: Avengers: Infinity War - Wakanda - Florian Witzel, Adam Lee, Miguel Perez Senent, Francisco Rodriguez; Fantastic Beasts: The Crimes of Grindelwald - Dominik Kirouac, Chloe Ostiguy, Christian Gaumond; Venom - Aharon Bourland, Jordan Walsh, Aleksandar Chalyovski, Federico Frassinelli
Outstanding Effects Simulations in an Animated Feature	Outstanding Compositing in a Photoreal Feature
Spider-Man: Into the Spider-Verse - Ian Farnsworth, Pav Grochola, Simon Corbaux, Brian D. Casper: Dr. Seuss' The Grinch - Snow, Clouds & Smoke - Eric Carme, Nicolas Brice, Milo Riccarand; Incredibles 2 - Paul Kanyuk, Tiffany Erickson Klohn, Vincent Serritella, Matthew Kiyoshi Wong; Ralph Breaks the Internet - Virus Infection & Destruction - Paul Carman, Henrik Fält, Christopher Hendryx, David Hutchins; Smallfoot - Henrik Karlsson, Theo Vandernoot, Martin Furness, Dmitriy Kolesnik	Avengers: Infinity War - Titan - Sabine Laimer, Tim Walker, Tobias Wiesner, Massimo Pasquetti: First Man - Joel Delle-Vergin, Peter Farkas, Miles Lauridsen, Francesco Dell’Anna; Jurassic World: Fallen Kingdom - John Galloway, Enrik Pavdeja, David Nolan, Juan Espigares Enriquez; Welcome to Marwen - Woei Lee, Saul Galbiati, Max Besner, Thai-Son Doan

=== Television ===
Outstanding Visual Effects in a Photoreal Episode	Outstanding Supporting Visual Effects in a Photoreal Episode
Lost in Space – Danger, Will Robinson – Jabbar Raisani, Terron Pratt, Niklas Jacobson, Joao Sita: Altered Carbon – Out of the Past – Everett Burrell, Tony Meagher, Steve Moncur, Christine Lemon, Joel Whist; Krypton - The Phantom Zone – Ian Markiewicz, Jennifer Wessner, Niklas Jacobson, Martin Pelletier; The Terror – Go For Broke – Frank Petzold, Lenka Líkařová, Viktor Muller, Pedro Sabrosa; Westworld – The Passenger – Jay Worth, Elizabeth Castro, Bruce Branit, Joe Wehmeyer, Michael Lantieri	Tom Clancy's Jack Ryan – Pilot – Erik Henry, Matt Robken, Bobo Skipper, Deak Ferrand, Pau Costa: The Alienist – The Boy on the Bridge - Kent Houston, Wendy Garfinkle, Steve Murgatroyd, Drew Jones, Paul Stephenson; The Deuce – We're All Beasts – Jim Rider, Steven Weigle, John Bair, Aaron Raff; The First – Near and Far – Karen Goulekas, Eddie Bonin, Roland Langschwert, Bryan Godwin, Matthew James Kutcher; The Handmaid's Tale – June – Brendan Taylor, Stephen Lebed, Winston Lee, Leo Bovell
Outstanding Visual Effects in a Commercial	Outstanding Animated Character in an Episode or Real-Time Project
John Lewis – The Boy and the Piano – Kamen Markov, Philip Whalley, Anthony Bloor, Andy Steele: Beyond Good and Evil 2 – Maxime Luere, Leon Berelle, Remi Kozyra, Dominique Boidin; McDonald's – #ReindeerReady – Ben Cronin, Josh King, Gez Wright, Suzanne Jandu; U. S. Marine Corps – A Nation's Call – Steve Drew, Nick Fraser, Murray Butler, Greg White, Dave Peterson; Volkswagen – Born Confident – Carsten Keller, Anandi Peiris, Dan Sanders, Fabian Frank	Lost in Space – Humanoid – Chad Shattuck, Paul Zeke, Julia Flanagan, Andrew McCartney: Cycles – Rae – Jose Luis Gomez Diaz, Edward Everett Robbins III, Jorge E. Ruiz Cano, Jose Luis -Weecho- Velasquez; Nightflyers – All That We Have Found – Eris – Peter Giliberti, James Chretien, Ryan Cromie, Cesar Dacol Jr.; Marvel's Spider-Man – Doc Ock – Brian Wyser, Henrique Naspolini, Sophie Brennan, William Salyers
Outstanding Animated Character in a Commercial	Outstanding Created Environment in an Episode, Commercial, or Real-Time Project
Volkswagen – Born Confident – Bam – David Bryan, Chris Welsby, Fabian Frank, Chloe Dawe: McDonald's – Bobbi the Reindeer – Gabriela Ruch Salmeron, Joe Henson, Andrew Butler, Joel Best; Overkill's The Walking Dead – Maya – Jonas Ekman, Goran Milic, Jonas Skoog, Henrik Eklundh; PETA – Best Friend – Lucky – Bernd Nalbach, Emanuel Fuchs, Sebastian Plank, Christian Leitner	Lost in Space – Pilot – Impact Area – Philip Engström, Kenny Vähäkari, Jason Martin, Martin Bergquist: Cycles – The House – Michael R.W. Anderson, Jeff Gipson, Jose Luis Gomez Diaz, Edward Everett Robbins III; The Deuce – 42nd St – John Bair, Vance Miller, Jose Marin, Steve Sullivan; The Handmaid's Tale – June - Fenway Park – Patrick Zentis, Kevin McGeagh, Leo Bovell, Zachary Dembinski; The Man in the High Castle – Reichsmarschall Ceremony – Casi Blume, Michael Eng, Ben McDougal, Sean Myers
Outstanding Effects Simulations in an Episode, Commercial, or Real-Time Project	Outstanding Compositing in a Photoreal Episode
Altered Carbon – Philipp Kratzer, Daniel Fernandez, Xavier Lestourneaud, Andrea Rosa: Lost in Space – Jupiter is Falling – Denys Shchukin, Heribert Raab, Michael Billette, Jaclyn Stauber; Lost in Space – The Get Away – Juri Bryan, Will Elsdale, Hugo Medda, Maxime Marline; The Man in the High Castle – Statue of Liberty Destruction – Saber Jlassi, Igor Zanic, Nick Chamberlain, Chris Parks	Lost in Space – Crash Site Rescue – David Wahlberg, Douglas Roshamn, Sofie Ljunggren, Fredrik Lönn: Altered Carbon – Jean-François Leroux, Reece Sanders, Stephen Bennett, Laraib Atta; The Handmaid's Tale – June – Winston Lee, Gwen Zhang, Xi Luo, Kevin Quatman; Silicon Valley – Artificial Emotional Intelligence – Fiona – Tim Carras, Michael Eng, Shiying Li, Bill Parker
Outstanding Compositing in a Photoreal Commercial	
Apple – Welcome Home – Michael Ralla, Steve Drew, Alejandro Villabon, Peter Timberlake: Apple – Unlock – Morten Vinther, Michael Gregory, Gustavo Bellon, Rodrigo Jimenez; Genesis – G90 Facelift – Neil Alford, Jose Caballero, Joseph Dymond, Greg Spencer; John Lewis – The Boy and the Piano – Kamen Markov, Pratyush Paruchuri, Kalle Kohlstrom, Daniel Benjamin	

=== Other categories ===
Outstanding Visual Effects in a Real-Time Project	Outstanding Visual Effects in a Special Venue Project
Age of Sail – John Kahrs, Kevin Dart, Cassidy Curtis, Theresa Latzko: Cycles – Jeff Gipson, Nicholas Russell, Lauren Nicole Brown, Jorge E. Ruiz Cano; Dr. Grordbort's Invaders – Greg Broadmore, Mhairead Connor, Steve Lambert, Simon Baker; God of War – Maximilian Vaughn Ancar, Corey Teblum, Kevin Huynh, Paolo Surricchio; Marvel's Spider-Man – Grant Hollis, Daniel Wang, Seth Faske, Abdul Bezrati	Childish Gambino's Pharos – Keith Miller, Alejandro Crawford, Thelvin Cabezas, Jeremy Thompson: Beautiful Hunan: Flight of the Phoenix – B. R. Rajeev, Suhit Saha, Arish Fyzee, Unmesh Nimbalkar; DreamWorks Theatre Presents Kung Fu Panda – Marc Scott, Doug Cooper, Michael Losure, Alex Timchenko; Osheaga Music and Arts Festival – Andre Montambeault, Marie-Josee Paradis, Alyson Lamontagne, David Bishop Noriega; Pearl Quest – Eugénie von Tunzelmann, Liz Oliver, Ian Spendloff, Ross Burgess
Outstanding Visual Effects in a Student Project	
Terra Nova – Thomas Battistetti, Mélanie Geley, Mickael Le Mezo, Guillaume Hoarau: Chocolate Man – David Bellenbaum, Aleksandra Todorovic, Jörg Schmidt, Martin Boué; Proxima-b – Denis Krez, Tina Vest, Elias Kremer, Lukas Löffler; Ratatoskr – Meike Müller, Lena-Carolin Lohfink, Anno Schachner, Lisa Schachner	

== Most nominations ==
Nominations	Films/Programs
6	Avengers: Infinity War
6	Lost in Space
5	Incredibles 2
5	Ready Player One
4	Altered Carbon
4	Dr. Seuss' The Grinch
4	Spider-Man: Into the Spider-Verse
3	First Man
3	Jurassic World: Fallen Kingdom
3	Solo: A Star Wars Story
3	Welcome to Marwen

== Most wins ==
Wins	Films/Programs
4	Avengers: Infinity War
4	Lost in Space
4	Spider-Man: Into the Spider-Verse
2	Ready Player One
