= Tod Lippy =

American artist

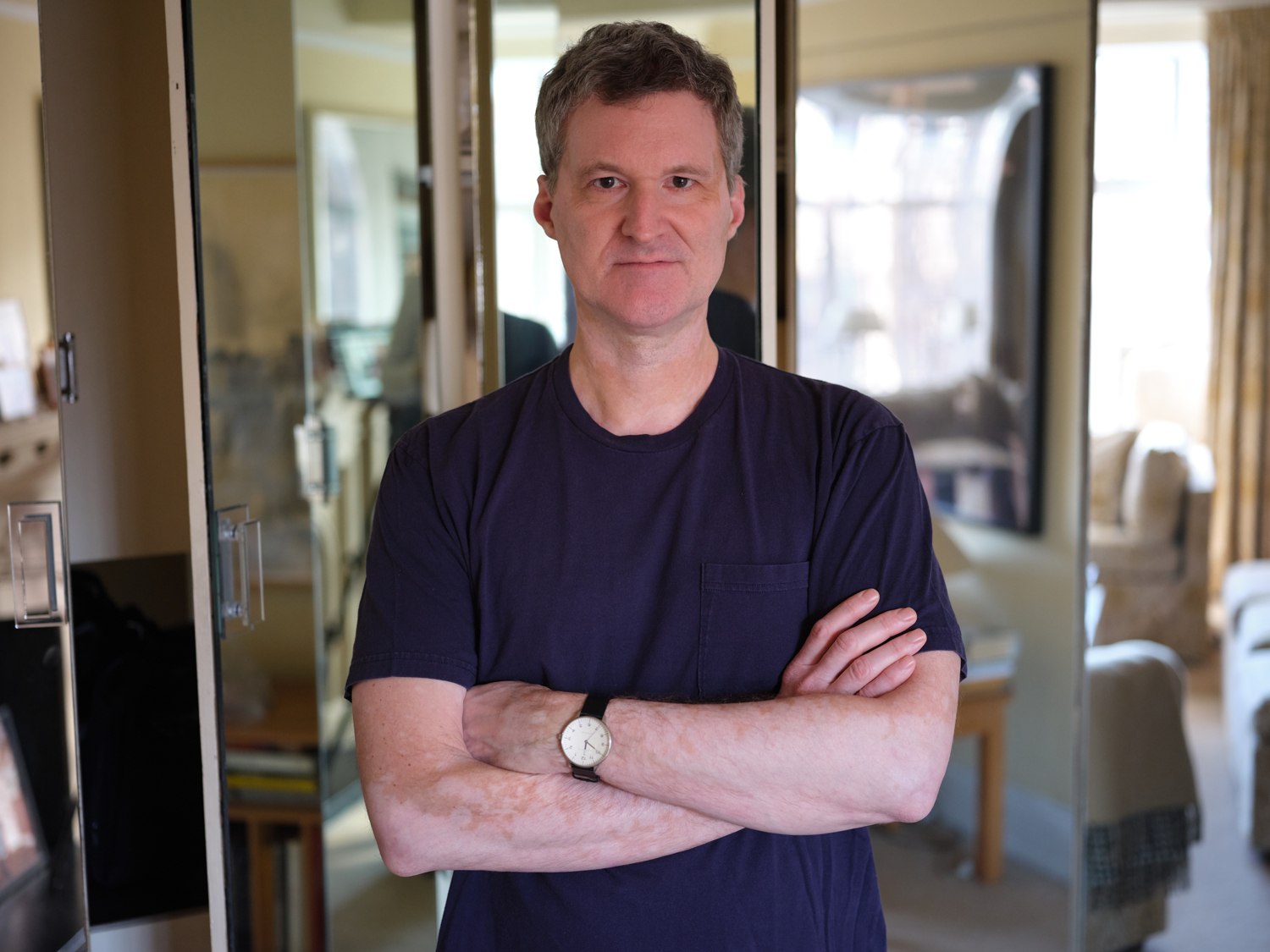
- Born: 1963 (age 62–63)
- Education: Williams College, New York University
- Notable work: Projections 11, Esopus, Modern Artifacts, Here We Are, Yearbook

Tod Lippy (born 1963 in Baltimore, Maryland) is an American artist, designer, writer, editor and musician. Lippy received an M.A. from the Williams College Graduate Program in the History of Art in 1988, and an M.A. in cinema studies from New York University in 1990. He joined the editorial staff at Print magazine in 1991, eventually becoming the magazine's senior editor. Lippy co-founded and edited Scenario: The Magazine of Screenwriting Art (1994–97) and the arts zine publicsfear (1992–93). His 2000 book, Projections 11: New York Film-Makers on Film-Making, was published by Faber & Faber. In 2003, he established the Esopus Foundation Ltd., a 501(c)(3) arts organization.

== Esopus magazine ==
In the summer of 2003, Lippy edited and designed the first issue of Esopus, the main program of the Esopus Foundation, which was declared "a thing of lavish, eccentric beauty, less flipped through than stared at", by David Carr of The New York Times in 2004. Lippy was the publication's editor, designer, publisher, and sole full-time employee until it suspended publication in 2018 after 25 issues. Esopus has been the subject of dedicated exhibitions at de Appel Art Center in Amsterdam (2016), the Nasher Sculpture Center in Dallas (2017), and the Colby College Museum of Art (2024). Lippy's particular approach to the presentation of creative work in an unmediated format has been featured in numerous print and digital features as well as interviews on NPR stations such as KCRW and WNYC. Lippy's influential design work for Esopus has been featured in books such as the Graphis Design Annual, Print Design Annual, Essentials of Visual Communication (Laurence King, 2008), and Art Direction + Editorial Design (Abrams, 2007)—and in exhibitions at venues including the Walker Art Center, Rome's Contemporary Art Museum, and the Casino Luxembourg. He has been invited to participate in a number of panel discussions related to small-press and nonprofit publishing, including the 2009 conference of the American Library Association's Rare Books and Manuscripts Section at the University of Virginia in 2009 and the AIGA "Fresh Dialogue" speakers' series in 2007.

== Teaching and lectures ==
From 1998 to 2002, Lippy was an adjunct faculty member at the School of Visual Arts M.F.A. Design program, where he developed the graduate seminar "The Magazine Workshop". He has since lectured at educational and cultural institutions including the Cooper Union for the Advancement of Science and Art, the Cooper-Hewitt National Design Museum, Nasher Sculpture Center, MTV Networks, Aesop, Bennington College, Rice University, New York University, Colby College, USC's Roski School of Fine Arts, and Yale University. He has been interviewed for a range of journals, radio programs, and books, including Becoming a Graphic Designer (Wiley, 2005); Fresh Dialogue: Making Magazines (Princeton Architectural Press, 2007); and the NPR program From Scratch.

== Design ==
Besides serving as designer of all Esopus issues, subscriber editions, books, and Esopus Foundation collateral material, Lippy also works as a freelance graphic designer. He has designed a number of books for Derek Eller Gallery, including Alyson Shotz (2014), Karl Wirsum: Mr. Whatzit (2017); and Jameson Green (2022), as well as the covers (with Rodrigo Corral) of Louis Menand's The Free World: Art and Thought in the Cold War (Farrar, Straus and Giroux, 2021) and Jason Bitner's Found Polaroids (Quack!Media, 2007). In 2023, he designed Tina Barney: The Beginning (Radius Books), featuring never-before-seen early work by the acclaimed American photographer. Lippy's design work has also extended into musical packaging, including the CD for Composer Alive, and Seth Boustead: Cosmicomics (Access Contemporary Music) as well as all of his own musical releases.

== Other ventures ==
From 2009 to 2012, Lippy served as curator and director of Esopus Space, an alternative exhibition and performance venue in New York City, where he mounted 18 exhibitions and staged 30 events. Lippy also curated the exhibitions "Mark Hogancamp" (2006) and "Don Bachardy: One-Day Stands" (2008; jointly organized with Matthew Higgs) at White Columns in Manhattan; and "Mark Hogancamp: Women of Marwencol" (2014; co-curated with Janet Hicks) and "Golden Years: Photographs by Ed Rosenbaum" (2016) at Pioneer Works in Brooklyn. In 2018, Lippy launched the event series "In Process", for which he interviewed creative people from a range of disciplines about the process behind their work at Soho House. His subjects included photographer Tina Barney, designer Fernando Santangelo, MoMA archivist Michelle Elligott, film producer Alan Elliott, and podcaster/journalist Leon Neyfakh. Lippy's 2000 short narrative film Cookies was shown in 20 film festivals in the U.S. and abroad. Lippy designed, edited, and co-authored (with Michelle Elligott) the book Modern Artifacts (Esopus Books), which was released in June 2020 to critical acclaim. The publication ended up on the "best of the year" lists of The New York Times, the Los Angeles Times, and New York magazine. Lippy edited and designed The Esopus Reader, an anthology of written contributions to Esopus from figures including Karl Ove Knausgaard, Lisa Kudrow, Ann Goldstein, Lonnie Holley, and Christopher Wheeldon that was published by Esopus Books in February 2022. The book was declared both "brilliant and highbrow" in New York magazine's "Approval Matrix" feature upon its release. Lippy's book of in-depth interviews with figures including David O. Russell, Wes Anderson, Frances McDormand, and Spike Lee, Projections 11: New York City Film-makers on New York Film-making, was published by Faber and Faber in 2000.

== Art ==
In 2024, Private, a series of images taken by Lippy of the off-limits areas of contemporary art galleries, was the subject of one-person exhibitions at The Meeting (New York), and The Future Perfect (LA), as well as an evening of screenings and performances at Public Records in Brooklyn. An eponymous book published by Mirrorical Books that same year featured a selection of the photographs along with an afterword written by novelist Ed Park.

In 2025, My Fellow Americans, a series of portraits painted by Lippy of 50 Trump voters, were featured in a pop-up exhibition in March in Los Angeles, and then subsequently presenting by The Meeting (New York) at Independent Art Fair in New York City from May 7 to May 11. In a review of the fair, New York Times art critic Will Heinrich wrote, "Earnest and obsessive, but with more than a whiff of artificial intelligence, 'My Fellow Americans,' as [Lippy] calls the whole project, may be the perfect response to our cultural moment."

Lippy made "All of the Gang," a single-channel video featuring correspondence between Jeffrey Epstein and art world figures, in the winter of 2026. On February 28, he hired an LED billboard truck to display the video throughout the city of Los Angeles, focusing specifically on Frieze Art Fair, other satellite fairs, and areas with contemporary art galleries in West Hollywood, the Melrose Hill district, and Beverly Hills.

== Music ==
In October 2019 Lippy released his first album, Here We Are. Its lead single, "Good Start", was selected by L.A. radio station KCRW as its "Today's Top Tune" on Monday, September 2, 2019. Lippy produced the 10-song album with Kramer, who also mixed and mastered it in the summer of 2019. Lippy's second album, Yearbook, was released on June 25, 2021, to positive reviews. Midterms, a 6-song EP including the singles "Assorted Hits 11," "Happy Ending," and "Adam," was released in the summer of 2022. Closer Than They Appear, an album featuring Lippy's covers of songs by musical acts including Tom Petty and the Heartbreakers, Low, Lucinda Williams, and The Alan Parsons Project, was released on November 4, 2022. The Present, his fourth full-length LP (produced by Bryce Goggin), was released in 2024.

In the summer of 2025, Lippy partnered with UK-based sound artist and composer Owain Kelly for GULFF, a fully remote experimental musical project. A first album is forthcoming in late 2026. "Error," the first single from the LP, was released on February 20, 2026.

=== Albums ===
- Here We Are (2019)
- Yearbook (2021)
- Closer Than They Appear (2022)
- The Present (2024)

=== EPs ===
- Midterms (2022)
- Worst Enemy (2026)

=== Singles ===
- "Good Start" (2019)
- "Remember Your Doctor" (2019)
- "Boy" (2019)
- "Wrap Your Troubles in Dreams" (2020)
- "Names" (2020)
- "Ambitions" (2021)
- "More in Common" (2021)
- "Appian Way" (2021)
- "Life" (2021)
- "Bob" (2022)
- "Assorted Hits 11" (2022)
- "Happy Ending" (2022)
- "Adam" (2022)
- "Time" (2022)
- "Don't Come Around Here No More" (2022)
- "Sand River" (with Daniel Carlson) (2022)
- "Florida Plates" (2024)
- "Perfect" (2024)
- "Today" (2024)
- "Anyway" (2025)
- "The Ache" (2025)

=== Other Releases ===
- “Good Start” Remixed (2021): 4-track cassette with contributions from Sonic Boom, Kramer, Julian Lynch, and Carl Stone
- Assorted Hits 11 (2022): Limited-edition cassingle with B-side ("After School")
- "Florida Plates" Remixed (2024): 4-track cassette with contributions from Dan Konopka, Macau and Nathalie Q, Philip Larsen, and Davide Russo.

== Recognition ==
In August 2018, Lippy was awarded a MacDowell Colony Fellowship, during which he completed a series of drawings related to Esopus that were published in the book Esopus Drawings in the fall of 2018. He was the recipient of Specific Object's "Object of the Year" award (for Esopus) in 2007 and was given an Acker Award in 2018 for his contributions to the downtown NYC avant-garde community.
