= Bettina Pousttchi =

German artist (born 1971)

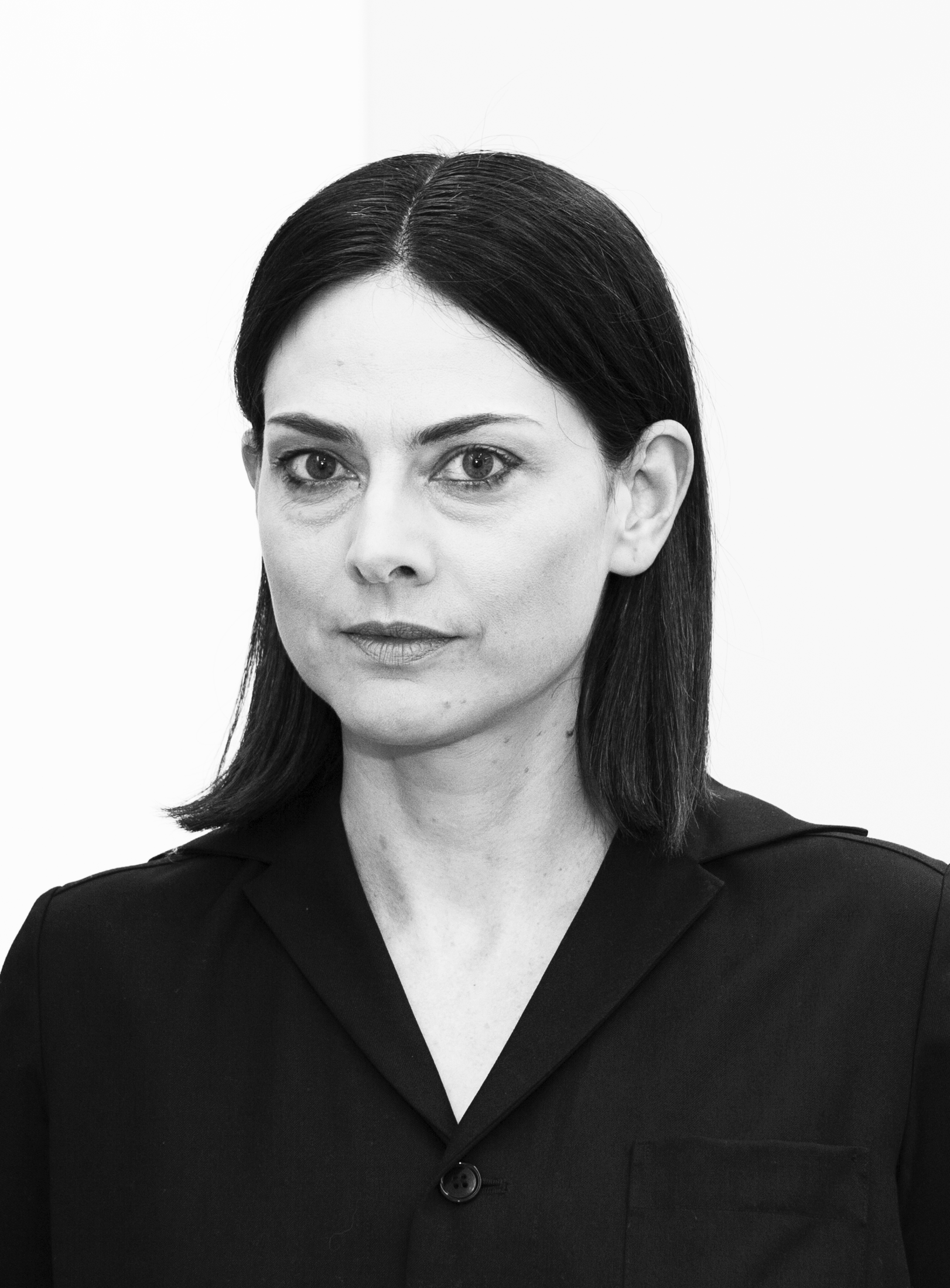
- Bettina Pousttchi 2023
- Born: 1971; Mainz, Germany
- Education: Kunstakademie Düsseldorf, Whitney Independent Study Program New York
- Known for: sculpture, photography, video and site-specific installation
- Notable work: Vertical Highways, World Time Clock
- Website: pousttchi.com

Bettina Pousttchi (born 1971) is a German artist of German-Iranian descent. She currently lives in Berlin. She has worked in sculpture, photography, video and site-specific installation.

== Life ==
Bettina Pousttchi studied at the Kunstakademie Düsseldorf under Rosemarie Trockel and Gerhard Merz (1995–1999). From 1999–2000, she participated in the Independent Studio Program of the Whitney Museum of American Art in New York. She had work in the Venice Biennale in 2003 and again in 2009. In 2014, she received the Kunstpreis der Stadt Wolfsburg. In 2016 she was a fellow at the Villa Aurora in Los Angeles.

== Work ==
=== World Time Clock ===
World Time Clock is the artist's most comprehensive photographic series to date, for which she has been travelling the different time zones of the world in several stages since 2008. In each of the places she photographed public clocks always at the same time: 1:55 pm. Thus arose a work spanning the entire globe which examines the political and social organization of time and space.

In 2016–2017 World Time Clock was shown at the Hirshhorn Museum and Sculpture Garden in a 360-degree presentation. After its initial full circle presentation at the Hirshhorn Museum and Sculpture Garden in Washington DC the series was also presented in Berlin at the Berlinische Galerie, Museum of Modern Art Berlin in 2019/2020 as well as the Aurora Museum in Shanghai in 2023.

=== Sculptures ===
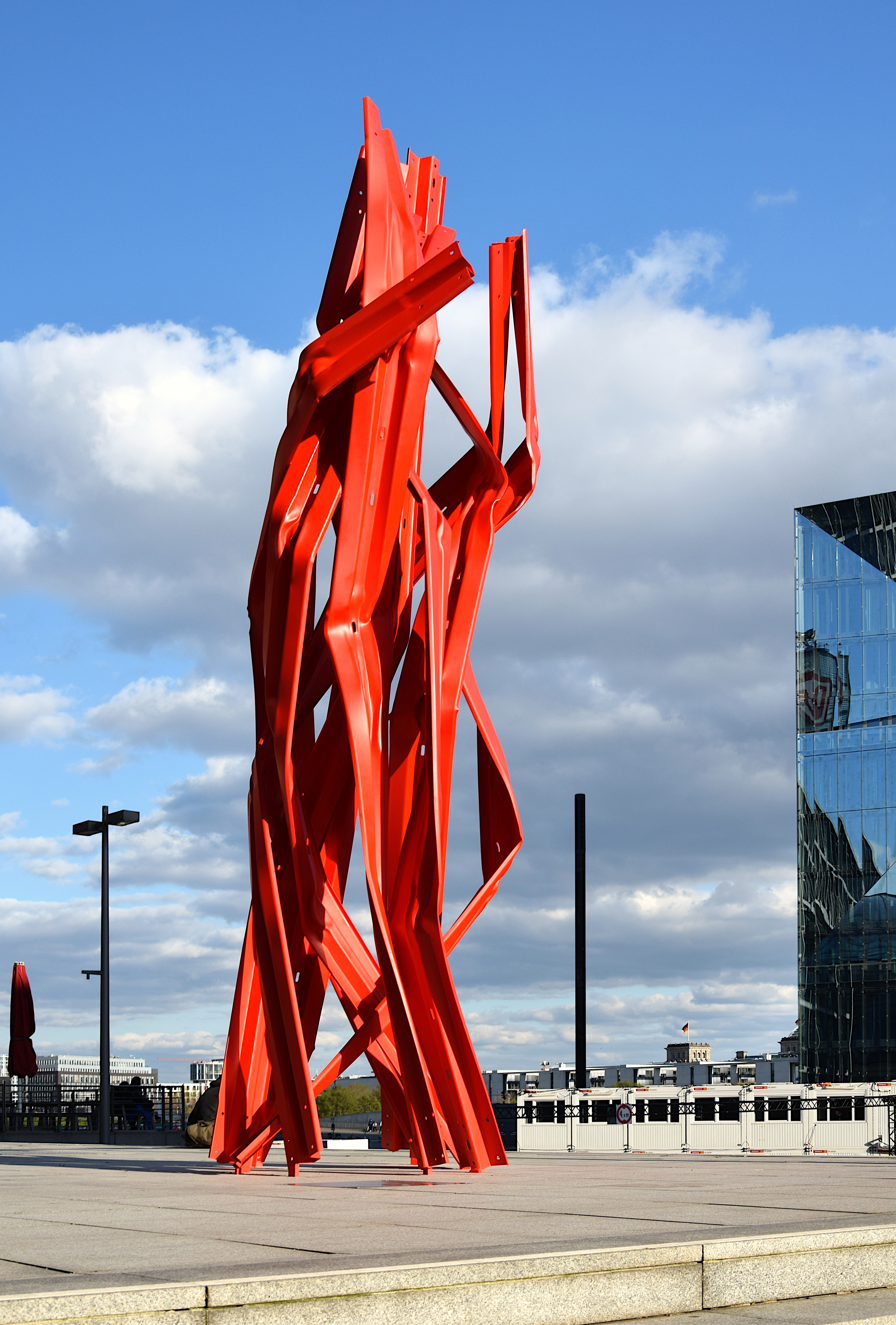
Vertical Highways (2023) at Berlin Hauptbahnhof, Germany

Since 2005 Pousttchi’s sculptural works often use street objects like street bollards, crowd barriers or bike racks as a starting point. She transforms these everyday objects into new sculptural compositions of various colors and surfaces. Her most recent sculptures Vertical Highways are transformations of crash barriers. The vertical alignment and modular use of a prefabricated element change the viewer’s spatial perception and give the work an architectural reference. By applying techniques such as bending or pressing, and reconceiving their coloring, Pousttchi relieves these everyday objects of their regulatory function and detaches them from their context of meaning, turning them into signs of change, fluid structures and dissolving boundaries. The first presentation of this new body of work took place in Berlin at the Berlinische Galerie on the occasion of the artist's survey exhibition In Recent Years in 2019/2020.

Three of these sculptures were presented at the Tuileries Garden in Paris in October 2021, as part of the outdoor exhibition Hors les Murs in front of the Musée du Louvre. Her largest sculpture of this series is a 6-meter-tall (20 ft) public sculpture that is located in front of the Berlin Central Station at Washingtonplatz, one of the most frequented places in Berlin, vis-a-vis the Reichstag.

=== Façades in public space ===
Since 2009, Bettina Pousttchi has been realizing photographic interventions on public buildings, which are related to the urban and historic context of each particular place. Her monumental photo installation Echo on Schlossplatz in Berlin covered the entire exterior façade of the Temporäre Kunsthalle for half a year and related to the urban history of Berlin. Extending nearly 2,000 square meters, the installation consisted of 970 different paper posters, and formed a continuous motif that recalled the Palast der Republik (Palace of the Republic), the building which had just been demolished on that very site.

In 2014, the artist transformed the Nasher Sculpture Center Dallas into a Drive-Thru Museum, referencing the site's history and the architecture of the Renzo Piano building. Her up to now largest photo installation to this point is The City (2014), which covered three sides of the Wolfsburg castle with a 2,150 square meter photographic print. The photomontage shows ten skyscrapers that have been the world's highest buildings, grouping them together into an imaginary single transnational skyline.

On the occasion of her survey exhibition In Recent Years 2019-2020 at Berlinische Galerie, she transformed the entire glass façade of the museum with the photo installation Berlin Window.

Konzerthaus Berlin commissioned the artist 2021 on the occasion of their bicentennial with the work, Amplifier transforming the historical building by Karl Friedrich Schinkel on Gendarmenmarkt. For the Bundeskunsthalle Bonn the artist has realized in 2022/2023 the rooftop installation The Curve, a 37-meter-long (121 ft) participatory sculpture that invited the viewer to use the object.

== Collections ==
Her works are held in various public collections, among them the Hirshhorn Museum and Sculpture Garden and the Phillips Collection in Washington, D.C., the Arts Club of Chicago, the Nasher Sculpture Center in Dallas, Texas, the Berlinische Galerie in Berlin, the Albertina in Vienna, the Von-der-Heydt Museum in Wuppertal, the Kunsthalle Bielefeld, as well as in the collection of the Federal Republic of Germany.

== Collaborations ==
The artist has been realizing artistic collaborations with Rosemarie Trockel and Daniel Buren, she has been part of a film by Lawrence Weiner and she was a member of the Brutally Early Club founded by Hans Ulrich Obrist.

== Grants and awards ==
- 2016: Villa Aurora, Los Angeles
- 2014: Wolfsburg Art Prize, Junge Stadt sieht Junge Kunst
- 2008: TrAIN, Research Center for Transnational Art, Identity and Nation, University of the Arts, London
- 2007: BBAX - Berlin Buenos Aires Art Exchange
- 2005: Provinzial Förderprojekt
- 2000: Kunststiftung NRW

== Exhibitions ==
- Museum Morsbroich, Leverkusen (2001)
- Württembergischer Kunstverein Stuttgart (2003)
- Von der Heydt Museum, Wuppertal (2007)
- Temporäre Kunsthalle Berlin (2009/2010)
- Kunsthalle Basel (2011)
- Schirn Kunsthalle Frankfurt (2012)
- Städtische Galerie Wolfsburg (2014)
- Nasher Sculpture Center, Dallas, Texas (2014)
- The Phillips Collection, Washington D.C. (2016)
- Hirshhorn Museum and Sculpture Garden, Washington D.C (2016/2017)
- The Arts Club of Chicago (2017)
- Kunsthalle Mainz (with Daniel Buren) (2017)
- Kunstmuseum St. Gallen (2018)
- Neues Museum Nürnberg (2018)
- Kunsthalle Tübingen (2019/2020)
- KINDL – Centre of Contemporary Art Berlin (2019/2020)
- Berlinische Galerie, Berlin (2019/2020)
- Konzerthaus Berlin (2021)
- Arp Museum, Remagen (2021/2022)
- Bundeskunsthalle, Bonn (2022/2023)
- Aurora Museum, Shanghai (2023)
- Museum of Contemporary Art, Shanghai (2023)
- Museum Haus Konstruktiv, Zürich (2024)

== Publications and monographs ==
- Bettina Pousttchi: Fluidity, Arp Museum, Distanz Publisher, 2022, de/en, with texts by Petra Spielmann and Jutta Mattern, ISBN 978-3-95476-501-0
- Bettina Pousttchi: In Recent Years, Berlinische Galerie, Museum of Modern Art, Berlin, Koenig Books, London, 2020, de/en, with texts by Thomas Köhler, Jörg Heiser, Jeremy Strick, Melissa Ho, ISBN 978-3-96098-819-9
- Bettina Pousttchi: Metropolitan Life, Museo Nivola, Scheidegger & Spiess, 2018, with an essay by Greg Foster-Rice and a conversation with the artist by Hans Ulrich Obrist and Markus Miessen, ISBN 978-3-85881-826-3
- Bettina Pousttchi: World Time Clock, Hirshhorn Museum and Sculpture Garden Washington D.C.,/ Hatje Cantz, 2017, with texts by Melissa Chiu and Melissa Ho, ISBN 978-3-7757-4359-4
- Bettina Pousttchi: Suspended Mies, The Arts Club of Chicago 2017, with texts by Janine Mileaf and Greg Foster-Rice, ISBN 978-1-891925-48-1
- Bettina Pousttchi: The City, Nasher Sculpture Center Dallas / Städtische Galerie Wolfsburg, Hatje Cantz Publisher 2015, de/en, with texts by Susanne Pfleger, Thomas Köhler, Jeremy Strick, Adam Szymczyk, and a conversation with the artist and Chris Dercon, ISBN 978-3-7757-3908-5
- Bettina Pousttchi: Framework, Schirn Kunsthalle Frankfurt, Verlag der Buchhandlung Walther König Köln, 2012, de/en, with texts by Katharina Dohm, Adam Szymczyk and a conversation with the artist and Nikolaus Hirsch, foreword by Max Hollein, ISBN 978-3-86335-164-9
- Bettina Pousttchi: Echo Berlin, Temporäre Kunsthalle Berlin, Verlag der Buchhandlung Walther König Köln, 2010, de/en, with texts by Tom McCarthy, Diedrich Diederichsen, Markus Miessen, Hans Ulrich Obrist, Bettina Pousttchi, Angela Rosenberg, Esther Ruelfs, ISBN 978-3-86560-833-8
- Bettina Pousttchi: Reality Reset, Von der Heydt Museum Wuppertal, Verlag der Buchhandlung Walther König, Köln, 2008, de/en, with texts by Barry Schwabsky, Jörg Heiser, Matthias Mühling, Petra Löffler, Niels Werber, Uta Grosenick, Jon Wood, Christian Rattemeyer, Mark Gisbourne, Vanessa Joan Müller, ISBN 978-3-86560-374-6
- Bettina Pousttchi: Departure, Verlag der Buchhandlung Walther König, Köln, 2007, de/en, ISBN 3-86560-285-1
- Bettina Pousttchi: Screen Settings, Württembergischer Kunstverein, Hatje Cantz Publisher, Ostfildern-Ruit, 2003, de/en, ISBN 3-7757-9178-7
