= Jeremy Strick =

- Born: Los Angeles, California
- Education: University of California, Santa Cruz, Harvard University
- Spouse: Wendy Strick

Jeremy Strick (born 1955) is an American museum director and former director of the Nasher Sculpture Center and Museum of Contemporary Art, Los Angeles.

== Early life and education ==
Strick attended University of California, Santa Cruz for his undergraduate degree and then Harvard University for his graduate studies in art history.

== Career ==
Strick served as a senior curator at the Art Institute of Chicago early in his career and held curatorial posts at the Saint Louis Art Museum and the National Gallery of Art, Washington, D.C. He was director of the MOCA, Los Angeles from 1999 to 2008. According to the Los Angeles Times, "It was on his watch here that MOCA became known as the best museum of postwar art in the country, if not the world, and a place where sweeping, historic theme shows were almost routine." He was ousted after financial problems were investigated by the California Attorney General including using restricted endowment funds for general operating expenses beginning in 2001 without obtaining consent from the donors or a court order. Strick was the Director of the Nasher Sculpture Center from March 2009 to 2024.

== Personal life ==
Strick met his wife, Wendy at Cowell College during his first day of sophomore year.
