= Erick Swenson =

American sculptor (born 1972)

Erick Lawrence Swenson (born 1972 in Phoenixville, Pennsylvania) is an American figurative sculptor living and working in Dallas, Texas.

== Education ==
He earned a B.F.A. in Studio Art, Painting and Drawing, from the School of Visual Arts, University of North Texas, in 1999.

== Exhibitions ==
I Am What I Isn't by Erick Swenson

Swenson has shown internationally at galleries and museums such as the Hammer Museum in Los Angeles, the Villa Stuck in Munich, and was included in the 2004 Biennial Exhibition of the Whitney Museum of American Art in New York. He held an exhibition in 2012 at the Nasher Sculpture Center, Dallas, running from April 14, the first solo exhibition there by a Dallas artist.

Swenson is known for his urethane resin recreations of creatures in death or distress. I Am What I Isn't, from 2017, is an example of the artist's finely detailed sculptures made entirely from cast urethane resin and acrylic paint. Some of his creatures are displayed in elaborate dioramas. Swenson's scenes often involve fabricated animals like deer, sheep, and apes captured frozen in allegorical moments. Inspired by museum exhibits and model making, Swenson's tableaux conjure the Romanticism of Caspar David Friedrich and the imagery of wintry Bavarian fairy tales.

Swenson is represented by the James Cohan Gallery in New York.

== Public Collections ==
- The Dallas Museum of Art, Dallas, Texas
- Honolulu Museum of Art, Honolulu, Hawaii
- Nasher Sculpture Center, Dallas, Texas
- Maramotti Collection, Reggio Emilia, Italy
- Modern Art Museum of Ft. Worth, Texas
- Museum of Fine Arts, Houston, Texas
- The Saatchi Collection, London
- Sheldon Memorial Art Gallery, University of Nebraska
- Whitney Museum of American Art, New York

== Awards ==
- 1999 The Arch and Anne Giles Kimbrough Fund, The Dallas Museum of Art, Dallas, TX
- 2004 The Joan Mitchell Painters and Sculptors Grant Program Award, The Joan Mitchell Foundation
