= Piero Golia =

Italian conceptual artist (born 1974)

- Born: 1974 (age 51–52); Naples, Italy
- Education: Universitá Ferderico II
- Known for: Conceptual

Piero Golia (born 1974) is a conceptual artist based in Los Angeles.

== Early life ==
Golia was born in Naples, Italy and studied chemical engineering prior to becoming a professional artist. He moved to Los Angeles in 2002.

== Art career ==
In 2008, Golia completed an installation for Site Santa Fe and later that year had his first Los Angeles exhibition where he installed a crushed bus at the LA Art fair. Golia says that he approaches his work intuitively and that the pieces "just happen."

In 2010, Golia installed a large light bulb on the roof of the Standard Hotel (now closed) in Los Angeles that was to be lit announcing when he was in Los Angeles and that would stay dark when he was not.

In 2013, Golia was invited to exhibit in the Italian Pavilion for the 2013 Biennale di Venezia where he exhibited a thirty-six ton cube of concrete mixed with two kilograms of gold sand and invited attendees to mine it. Also exhibited were painted-on vintage Hermès pocket squares.

== Exhibitions ==
Golia is currently represented by Gagosian Gallery and has exhibited worldwide including in the US, Germany, Italy, England, Mexico, France, Belgium, Denmark, and the Netherlands.

Golia exhibited in the Italian Pavilion during the 2013 Venice Biennale.

== Other projects ==
=== The Mountain School ===
In 2005, Golia and the artist Eric Wesley started the Mountain School of Arts, a free underground art school originally based in Los Angeles' Chinatown neighborhood where the curriculum centered on talks and seminars led by visiting artists and curators. Stil running, it is one of the oldest artist-run art schools in California.

=== New Atlantis Enterprises ===
in 2010. Golia formed New Atlantis Enterprises which had offices at the Pacific Design Center with the intent to raise funds for art projects, specifically a wall that was to separate Los Angeles from Orange County and would have taken $24 million to realize.

=== Chalet Hollywood ===
In 2013, Golia opened a creative speakeasy called Chalet, (later restaged as Chalet Dallas at the Nasher Sculpture Center in 2015). Architect Edwin Chan designed the space and Golia filled it with artwork from Mark Grotjahn and a piano said to have been played by Joseph Beuys. At the time Golia said his intent was to make the space "legendary" and a "celebrated tourist guide" attraction and gave out "tickets" in the form of limited edition solid silver coins.

== Awards and recognition ==
- 2013: Winner of a Graham Foundation Award for Art and Architecture.

== Public collections (selection) ==
Golia's work is represented in public collections internationally, including:

Los Angeles County Museum of Art, Los Angeles, CA; Marciano Art Foundation, Los Angeles, CA; Hammer Museum, Los Angeles, CA; Berggruen Institute, Los Angeles, CA; Kadist Foundation, San Francisco, CA; Museo Jumex, Mexico City, Mexico; Museo de Arte Contemporáneo de Castilla y León, León, Spain; Stedelijk Museum Amsterdam, Amsterdam, the Netherlands; Nasher Sculpture Center, Dallas, TX.

== Publications ==
- 15 Years of The Mountain School of Arts. Commentaries by: Andrew Berardini, Nana Bahlmann, Edited by: Ieva Raudsepa, John Pike, Tristan Rogers, Scientific editor: Piero Golia. Pages: 293. Format:8.5 x 11 in / 216 x 279 mm. Year: 2021. ISBN 9780997937145
- Piero Golia: The Painter. Edited by Ines Goldbach, Piero Golia, and Lorenzo Micheli Gigotti. With texts by Ines Goldbach, Piero Golia, Jonathan Monk.. Format: 24×34 cm. Pages: 96. Language: EN/DE. Year: 2017. ISBN 978-88-8056-003-6
- Piero Golia: Desert Interviews or How to Jump Off the Roof and Not Hit the Ground. Edited by Lisa Mark. Texts by John Armleder, Andrew Berardini, Piero Golia, Pierre Huyghe, Richard Jackson, Emilie Renard, Eric Wesley. Paperback, 5.75 x 8.25 in. 100 pgs. Pub Date 1/31/2011. Out of print. ISBN 9783037641064
- Akademie X: Lessons in Art + Life. Abramovic, Marina; Eliasson, Olafur; Graham, Dan; Studio Rags Media Collective. Format: Paperback. Size: 290 x 214 mm (11 3/8 x 8 3/8 in). Pages: 352 pp. Illustrations: 200 illustrations ISBN 0714867365
- Art School: (Propositions for the 21st Century), Publisher : The MIT Press; First THUS Edition (September 11, 2009). Language : English. Paperback : 373 pages. ISBN 0262134934
