= Marwencol (film) =

2010 American documentary film

- Theatrical release poster
- Directed by: Jeff Malmberg
- Produced by: Jeff Malmberg; Tom Putnam; Matt Radecki; Chris Shellen; Kevin W. Walsh
- Starring: Mark Hogancamp
- Edited by: Jeff Malmberg
- Music by: Ash Black Bufflo
- Production company: Open Face
- Distributed by: The Cinema Guild
- Release date: October 8, 2010
- Running time: 83 minutes
- Country: United States
- Language: English
- Budget: $38,000
- Box office: $112,036

Marwencol (also known as Village of the Dolls in the UK) is a 2010 American documentary film that explores the life and work of artist and photographer Mark Hogancamp. It is the debut feature of director Jeff Malmberg, produced through his production company Open Face. It was the inspiration for Welcome to Marwen, a 2018 drama directed by Robert Zemeckis.

== Synopsis ==
On April 8, 2000, Mark Hogancamp was attacked outside of a bar by five men who beat him nearly to death after he drunkenly told them he was a cross-dresser. After nine days in a coma and 40 days in the hospital, Hogancamp was discharged with brain damage that left him little memory of his previous life. Unable to afford therapy, he creates his own by building a 1/6-scale World War II–era Belgian town in his yard and populating it with dolls representing himself, his friends, and even his attackers. He calls that town Marwencol, blending the names Mark, Wendy, and Colleen.

Hogancamp was initially discovered by photographer David Naugle, who documented and shared his story with Esopus magazine.

== Production ==
The film was shot in New York State between 2006 and 2010, using a combination of DVCAM video and Super-8 film formats.

== Reception ==
On review aggregator Rotten Tomatoes, the film holds an approval rating of 98% based on 63 reviews, with an average rating of 8.4/10. The website's critical consensus reads, "Inspiring and fascinating, Marwencol depicts its subject with heartfelt tenderness, raising poignant questions about art and personal tragedy along the way." The site awarded the film its Golden Tomato Award for the best-reviewed documentary of the year. On Metacritic, the film has a weighted average score of 82 out of 100, based on 18 critics, indicating "universal acclaim".

The Los Angeles Times called the film "an exhilarating, utterly unique experience", while the Village Voice said that it's "exactly the sort of mysterious and almost holy experience you hope to get from documentaries and rarely do." The film was in the year-end top-10 lists of the Boston Globe, The Globe and Mail, Slate, New York magazine, The Oregonian, National Public Radio, and many others.

The film was included in Entertainment Weekly's July 6, 2012, article "50 Best Movies You've Never Seen". In the 2012 Slate article and online poll, "The Golden Age of Documentaries: What's the Best Doc of the Last 5 Years?", Marwencol was ranked No. 1 in the poll.

In the 2012 PBS/POV online poll, "The 100 Greatest Documentaries of All Time", Marwencol was ranked No. 91 in the poll.

In the April 22, 2013, New York article, "How Documentary Became the Most Exciting Kind of Filmmaking", Marwencol was among the films in the accompanying list, "The 20 Essential Documentaries of the Century".

In September 2016, Cinema Eye Honors named Marwencol as one of the 20 top nonfiction films of the past decade, based on a poll of 110 key figures in the documentary community.

In October 2019 Paste Magazine included Marwencol in their article, "The 30 Best Documentaries of the 2010s". The film was listed as #23.

== In popular culture ==
In 2013, Robert Zemeckis began work on a dramatization of the story for Universal Studios based on a script by Caroline Thompson. Welcome to Marwen was released in December 2018, starring Steve Carell as Hogancamp.

The ninth episode of the second season of Fox sitcom Raising Hope ("The Men of New Natesville") is an homage to the film.

The Spike Jonze–directed music video for the Beastie Boys song "Don't Play No Game That I Can't Win" was inspired by the film and Hogancamp's world.

The Russian musical group The Saint Petersburg Disco Spin Club released a track in 2011 called "Marwencol".

The American punk rock group Tough Broad released the 2012 song "Marwencol."

== Accolades ==
- Independent Spirit Awards
  - Find Your Audience Award
  - Truer Than Fiction Award
  - Best Documentary (nominated)
- Boston Society of Film Critics
  - Best Documentary
  - Best New Filmmaker
- Toronto Film Critics Association
  - Best Documentary (nominated)
- Detroit Film Critics Society
  - Best Documentary (nominated)
- Dallas-Fort Worth Film Critics Association
  - Best Documentary (nominated)
- International Documentary Association
  - Emerging Documentary Filmmaker Award
- Cinema Eye Honors
  - Outstanding Achievement in a Debut Feature Film
  - Outstanding Achievement in Nonfiction Feature Filmmaking (nominated)
  - Outstanding Achievement in Direction (nominated)
  - Outstanding Achievement in Editing (nominated)
- South by Southwest
  - Grand Jury Award for Best Documentary Film
- Comic-Con Film Festival
  - Best Documentary
  - Judges' Choice Award for Best Overall Film
- Seattle International Film Festival
  - Grand Jury Award for Best Documentary Film
- Hot Docs
  - HBO Emerging Artist Award
- Silverdocs
  - Cinematic Vision Award
- Vienna International Film Festival
  - Audience Award for Best Film
- Woodstock Film Festival
  - Best Documentary Feature
- Whistler Film Festival
  - Best Documentary
- Cleveland International Film Festival
  - Grand Jury Award for Best Documentary Film
- Independent Film Festival of Boston
  - Special Jury Award for Best Documentary Film
- Fantasia Festival
  - Best Documentary
- Belfast Film Festival
  - Maysles Brothers Award - Best Documentary
- Docville
  - Best International Documentary — Docville (Belgium)

== See also ==
- Welcome to Marwencol, Princeton Architectural Press, 2015. (ISBN 978-1616894153)
- List of films with longest production time
- Synecdoche, New York, a 2008 drama film about a theater director who creates a tremendously elaborate stage set, in an attempt to control a version of his own reality
