= Nasher Sculpture Center =

Museum in Dallas, USA

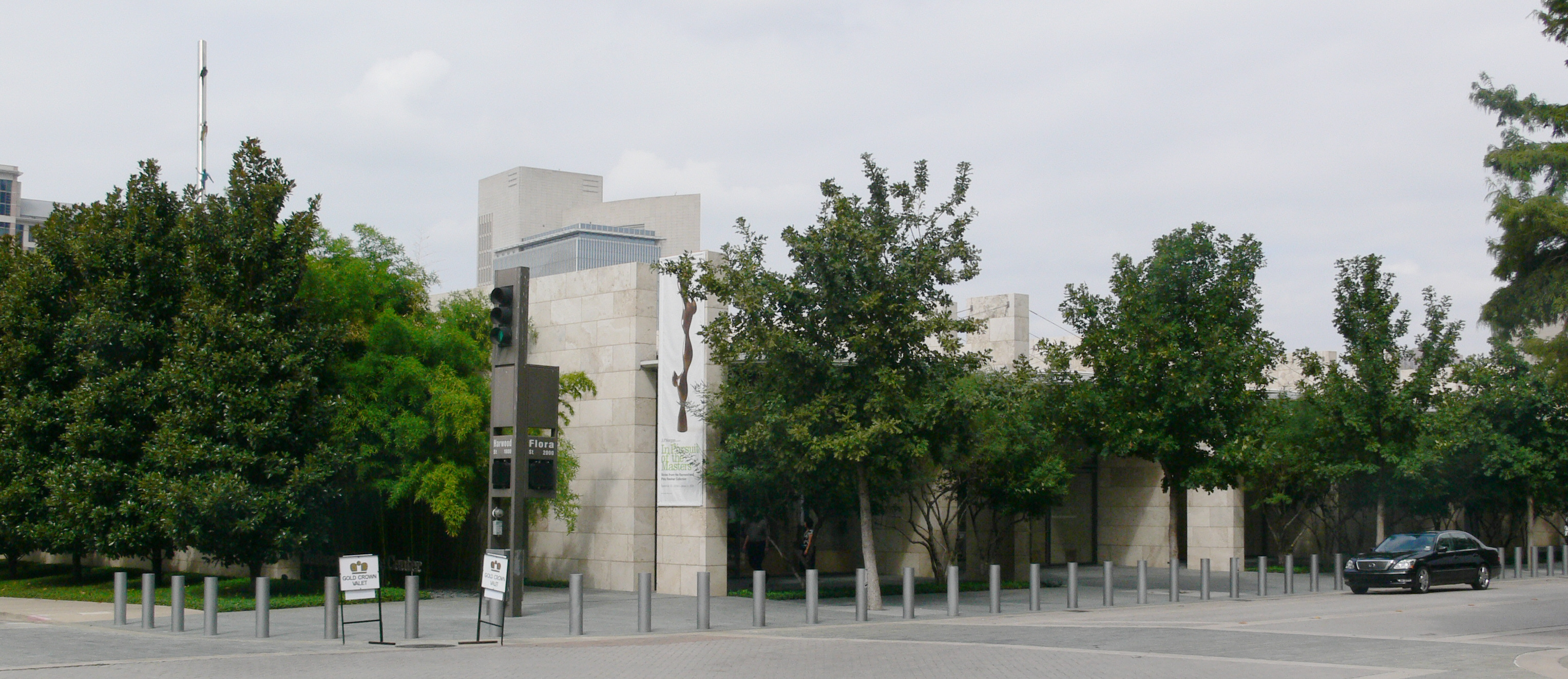
- Established: 2003
- Location: 2001 Flora St, Dallas, Texas
- Coordinates: 32°47′18″N 96°48′01″W
- Type: Art Museum
- Architects: Renzo Piano, Peter Walker
- Public transit access: M-Line: Olive & Flora, St Paul & Woodall Rodgers
- Website: nashersculpturecenter.org

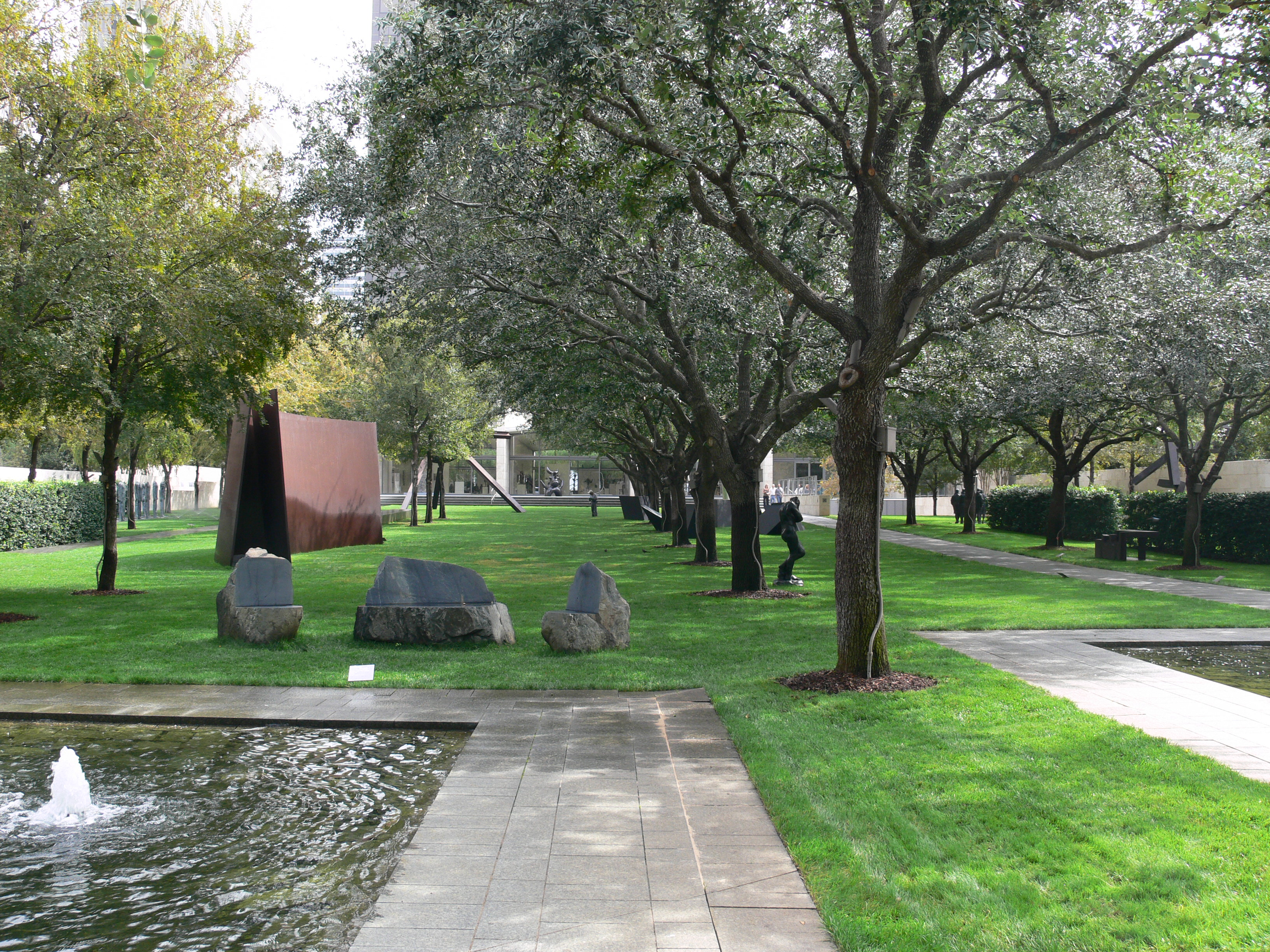
Nasher Sculpture Garden

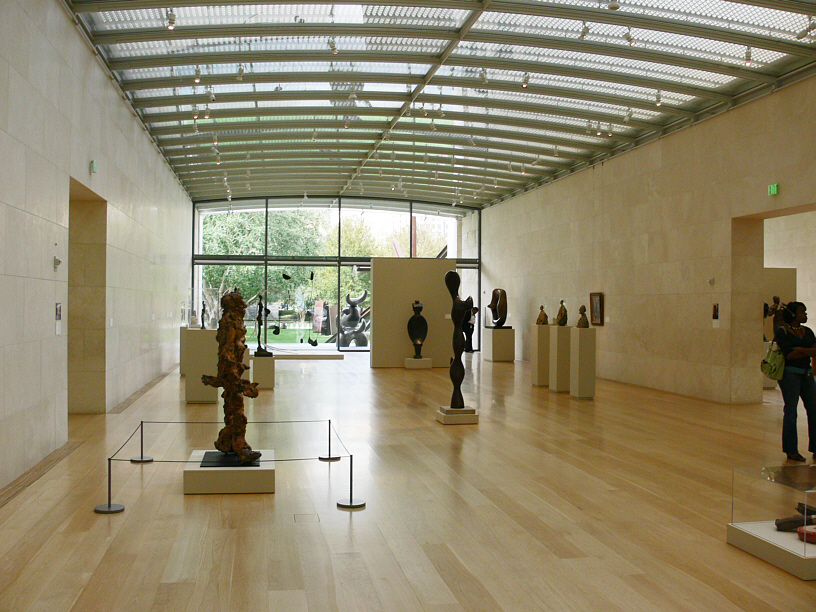
Inside the museum

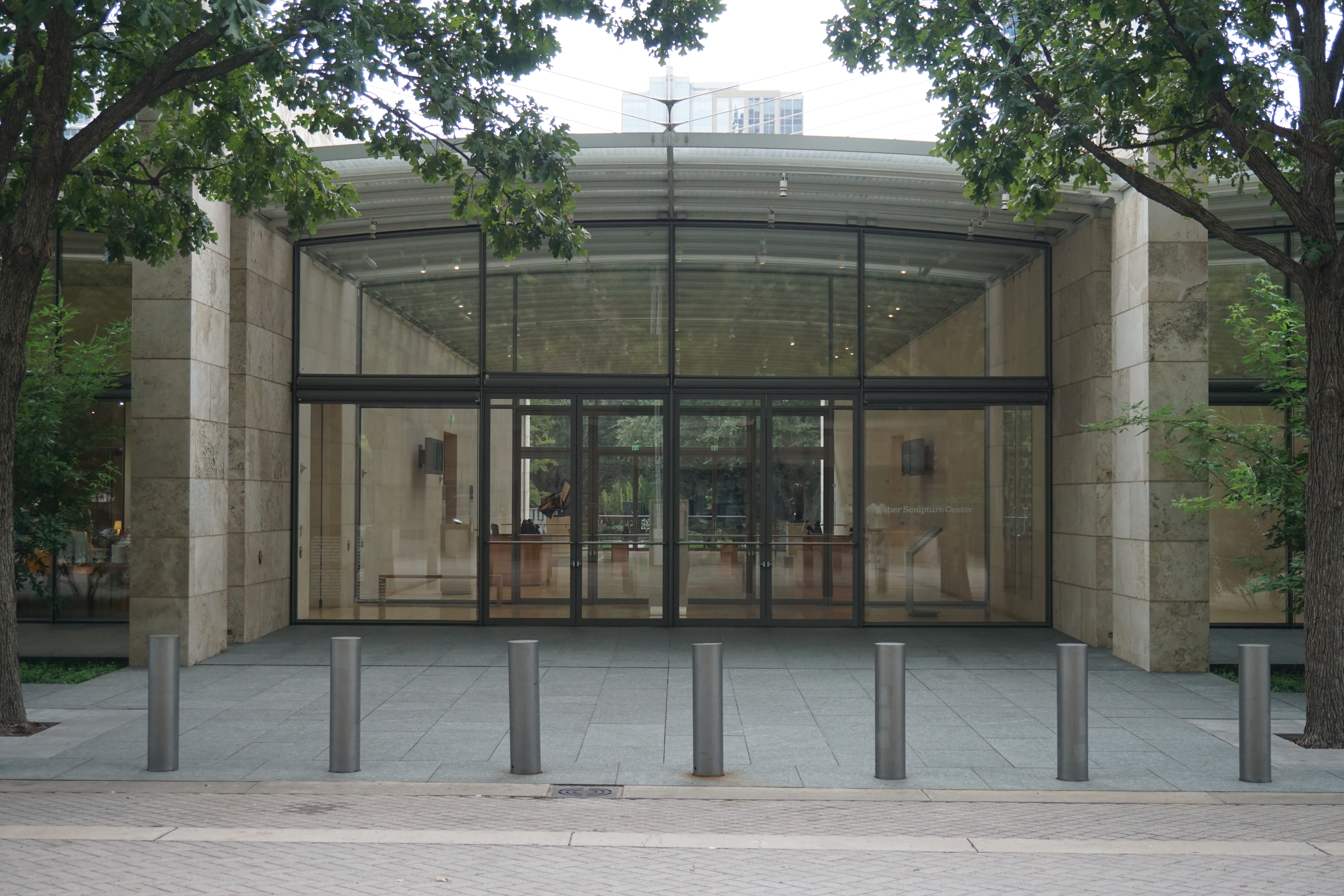
Exterior of the museum

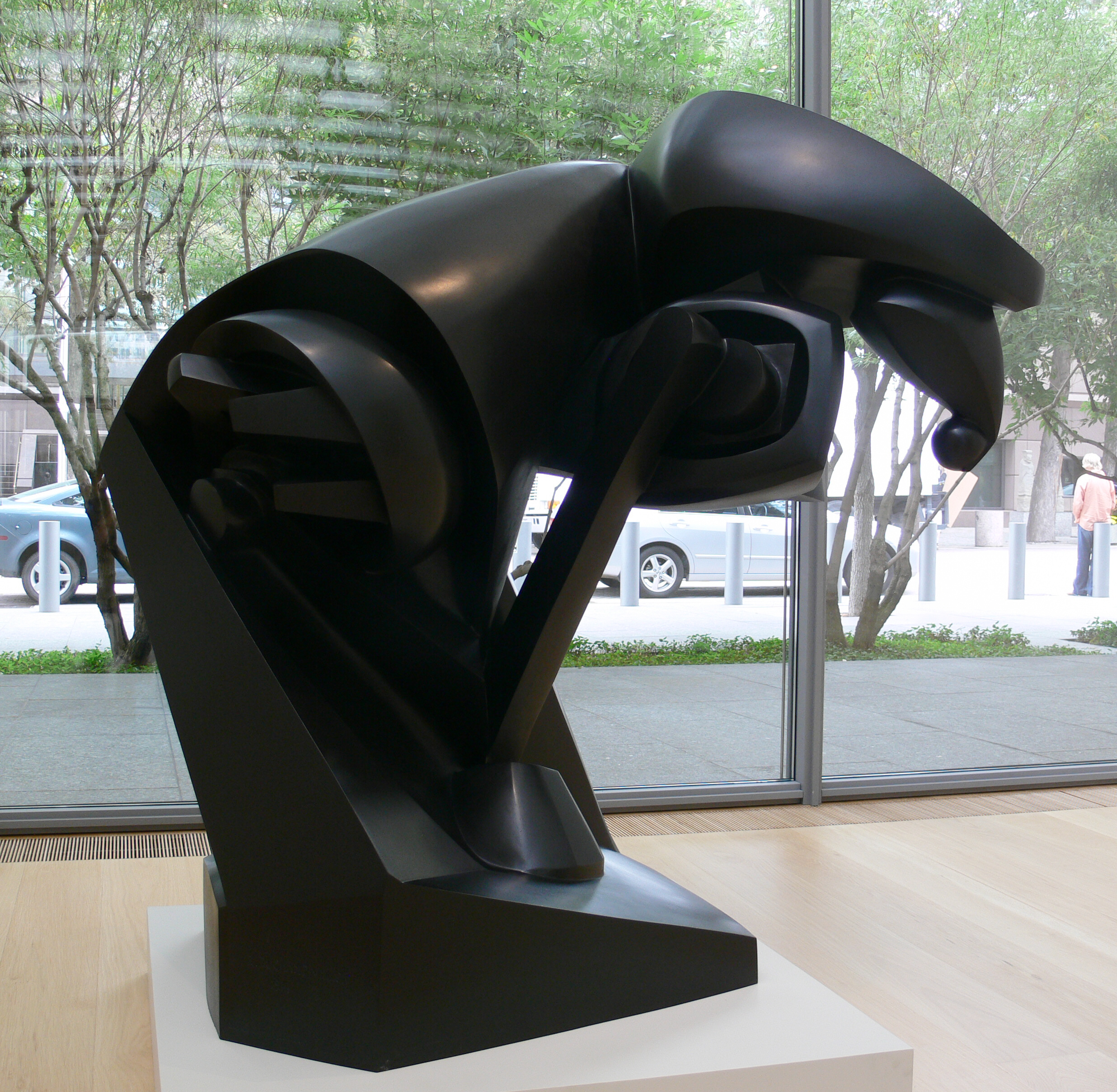
Large Horse by Raymond Duchamp-Villon

Opened in 2003, the Nasher Sculpture Center is a museum in Dallas, Texas, that houses the Patsy and Raymond Nasher collection of modern and contemporary sculpture. It is located on a 2.4-acre (9,700 m^{2}) site adjacent to the Dallas Museum of Art in the Dallas Arts District.

== Founding ==
Patsy and Raymond Nasher began collecting sculpture in the 1950s. Together they formed a comprehensive collection of masterpieces by Harry Bertoia, Constantin Brâncuși, Alexander Calder, Raymond Duchamp-Villon, Paul Gauguin, Willem de Kooning, Mark di Suvero, Alberto Giacometti, Barbara Hepworth, Ellsworth Kelly, Henri Matisse, Joan Miró, Henry Moore, Claes Oldenburg, Pablo Picasso, Auguste Rodin, Richard Serra, and David Smith, among others.

In 1997, Raymond Nasher acquired a plot of land in downtown Dallas across the street from the Dallas Museum of Art and hired architect Renzo Piano to design the Nasher Sculpture Center. The Nasher Foundation funded the entire $70 million cost of designing and constructing the museum, which includes indoor and outdoor galleries. The Sculpture Center opened in 2003 and features a regularly changing exhibition of works from the Raymond and Patsy Nasher Collection. By placing the facility on what was formerly part of the old Caruth family farm of c. 1850, Ray Nasher began the realization of the Arts District in Dallas, which has since been enhanced by the construction of the Winspear Opera House and the Wyly Theater.

== Architecture and garden ==
Renzo Piano, winner of the Pritzker Prize in 1998, is the architect of the Center's 55,000-square-foot (5,100 m^{2}) building; he had been selected after Nasher met him at the opening of the Beyeler Foundation in Basel, Switzerland, in 1997. Piano has designed several critically acclaimed art museums; foremost among them are the Beyeler Museum in Basel, the Menil Collection in Houston, and Georges Pompidou Centre in Paris (in collaboration with Richard Rogers). He has been praised as an architect who has the genius to meld art, architecture, and advanced engineering to create some of the most remarkable museums in the world.

Piano worked in collaboration with landscape architect Peter Walker of PWP Landscape Architecture on the design of the 2-acre (8,100 m^{2}) Garden. Walker has exerted a significant impact on the field of landscape architecture over a four-decade career. The scope of Walker's landscape projects is expansive and varied. It ranges from small gardens to new cities, corporate headquarters and academic campuses to urban plazas.

The building was constructed by The Beck Group, which also served as associate architect.

The facility opened in 2003 in a 55,000-square-foot building on a 2.4-acre site adjacent to the Dallas Museum of Art. Reflective glare of the nearby Museum Tower, constructed in 2012, comes in through the glass roof, putting portions of the collection at risk of damage. Artist James Turrell considered his work Tending (Blue) to be effectively destroyed by the tower's intrusion on its view, and the museum closed the artwork's chamber to the public at his request.

The museum has two levels: the ground level houses four galleries, institute offices, and a boardroom. The garden terraces downward to the auditorium, creating an open-air theater.

== Program ==
The Nasher Sculpture Center features rotating exhibitions drawn from the Nasher Collection as well as special exhibitions in its indoor and outdoor galleries. Among the major exhibitions organized by the Nasher are Matisse: Painter as Sculptor, the first Matisse sculpture retrospective in the U.S. in 20 years; Tony Cragg: Seeing Things, the first major U.S. museum exhibition of the artist in 20 years; and Variable States: Intention, Appearance, and Interpretation in Modern Sculpture, an exhibition and symposium on sculpture conservation organized in conjunction with the Getty. The Nasher Sculpture Center has also presented Jaume Plensa: Genus and Species; Alexander Calder and Contemporary Art: Form, Balance, Joy; and Ken Price Sculpture: A Retrospective.

Monthly events include Target First Saturdays for children and families, Til Midnight featuring Al Fresco dining, twilight strolls, bands and movies, and the NasherSalon series which welcomes distinguished speakers for an evening of discourse on art, architecture, and other cultural topics of interest. The Nasher Sculpture Center also participates in the Block Party Series together with the Dallas Museum of Art, the Crow Museum of Asian Art, and others in the Dallas Arts District.

=== 360 Speaker Series: Artists, Critics, Curators ===
- 2016 Speakers

Ann Veronica Janssens / Piero Golia with Ann Goldstein / Mai-Thu Perret / Martha Thorne / Agents, Advisors, Devils and Apostates: A New Art World, Panel Discussion / Plaster: Medium and Process, Panel Discussion / Kathryn Andrews / Michael Dean / Rachel Rose

- 2015 Speakers

Melvin Edwards / Stories from the French Sculpture Census / Iván Navarro / Jonathan Hammer / Phyllida Barlow with Tyler Green / Philip Beesley / Giuseppe Penone / Alex Israel / Edmund de Waal

- 2014 Speakers

Thomas Heatherwick / Anna-Bella Papp / Sarah Thorton / Tony Tasset / David Bates / Not Vital / Bettina Pousttchi / Mark Grotjahn / Tod Lippy / Liz Glynn

- 2013 Speakers

Mark Dion / Ken Price Sculpture Panel / Heather Cook / Matthew Collings / Nathan Mabry / Liz Larner / Katharina Grosse / Lewis Kachur / Analia Saban / Return to Earth Symposium / Nasher XChange Panel / Make Art with Purpose Panel / Charles Long with Tyler Green

- 2012 Speakers

Elliott Hundley / Tony Feher / Trenton Doyle Hancock / Erick Swenson / Ernesto Neto / Joseph Havel / The Art Guys / Kathryn Andrews / Lawrence Weiner / Catherine Craft / Eva Rothschild

- 2011 Speakers

Charles Renfro / Jessica Holmes/ Alfredo Jaar / A Conversation on Statuesque / Charles Long / Aaron Curry and Thomas Houseago / Annette Lawrence / Heather Rowe / Tony Cragg / Diana Al-Hadid / Lawrence Weschler/ Dore Ashton with Michael Corris

- 2010 Speakers

Michael Craig-Martin/ Adam Silverman and Nader Tehrani / William Jeffett / Allegra Pesenti / Linda Ridgway / Evan Holloway / Rick Lowe / Richard R. Brettell and Joachim Pissarro / Michael Corris / Antony Gormley / Alexander Calder and Contemporary Art Panel

== Exhibitions ==
- "Nic Nicosia; Everyday Surreal" May 16, 2026 - August 16, 2026
- Lynda Benglis: May 21, 2022 - September 18, 2022
- Magali Reus: A Sentence in Soil: May 14, 2022 - October 9, 2022
- Harry Bertoia: Sculpting Mid-Century Modern Life: January 29, 2022 – April 24, 2022
- Carol Bove: Collage Sculptures: October 16, 2021 – January 9, 2022
- Betye Saar: Call and Response: September 25, 2021 – January 2, 2022
- Guerrilla Girls: Takeover: May 12, 2021 – October 25, 2021
- Nasher Mixtape: February 6, 2021 – September 26, 2021
- Barry X Ball: Remaking Sculpture: January 25, 2020 – January 3, 2021
- Elmgreen & Dragset: Sculptures: September 14, 2019 – January 5, 2020
- Sheila Hicks: May 11, 2019 – August 18, 2019
- Sterling Ruby: Sculpture: February 2, 2019 – April 21, 2019
- The Nature of Arp: September 15, 2018 – January 6, 2019
- First Sculpture: Handaxe to Figure Stone: January 27, 2018 – April 28, 2018
- Tom Sachs: Tea Ceremony: September 16, 2017 – January 7, 2018
- Roni Horn: May 20, 2017 – August 20, 2017
- Richard Serra: Prints: January 28, 2017 – April 30, 2017
- Sightings: Michael Dean: October 22, 2016 – February 5, 2017
- Kathryn Andrews: Run for President: September 10, 2016 – January 8, 2017
- Joel Shapiro: May 7, 2016 – August 21, 2016
- Doris Salcedo: Plegaria Muda: February 27, 2016 – April 17, 2016
- Sightings: Mai-Thu Perret: March 12, 2016 – July 17, 2016
- Ann Veronica Janssens: January 23, 2016—April 17, 2016
- Sightings: Alex Israel: October 24, 2015 — January 31, 2016
- Piero Golia: Chalet Dallas: October 3, 2015 — February 7, 2016
- Giuseppe Penone: Being the River, Repeating the Forest: September 19, 2015—January 10, 2016
- Phyllida Barlow tryst: May 30, 2015—August 30, 2015
- Melvin Edwards: Five Decades: January 31, 2015 – May 10, 2015
- Sightings: Anna-Bella Papp: October 24, 2014 – January 18, 2015
- Provocations: The Architecture and Design of Heatherwick Studio: September 13, 2014 – January 4, 2015
- Mark Grotjahn Sculpture: May 31, 2014 – August 17, 2014
- Sightings: Bettina Pousttchi: April 12, 2014 – August 17, 2014
- David Bates: February 9, 2014 – May 11, 2014
- Return to Earth: September 21, 2013 – January 19, 2014
- Katharina Grosse: WUNDERBLOCK: June 1, 2013 – September 1, 2013
- Ken Price: A Retrospective: February 9, 2013 – May 12, 2013
- Rediscoveries: Modes of Making in Modern Sculpture: September 29, 2012 – January 13, 2013
- Sculpture in So Many Words: Text Pieces 1960–1980: September 29, 2012 – January 13, 2013
- Ernesto Neto: Cuddle on the Tightrope: May 12, 2012 – September 9, 2012
- Sightings: Eric Swenson: April 14, 2012 – September 9, 2012
- Sightings: Diana Al-Hadid: October 22, 2011 – January 15, 2012
- Elliot Hundley: The Bacchae: January 28, 2012 – April 22, 2012
- Tony Cragg: Seeing Things: September 10, 2011 – January 8, 2012
- Sightings: Martin Creed: March 26, 2011 – August 21, 2011
- Alexander Calder and Contemporary Art: Form, Balance, Joy: December 11, 2010 – March 6, 2011
- Sightings: Alyson Shotz: October 1, 2010 – January 2, 2011
- Revelation: The Art of James Magee: September 4 – November 28, 2010
- Rachel Whiteread Drawings: May 22 – August 15, 2010
- Jaume Plensa: Genus and Species: January 30 – May 2, 2010
- The Art of Architecture: Foster + Partners: September 26, 2009 – January 10, 2010
- George Segal: Street Scenes: January 24 – April 5, 2009
- In Pursuit of the Masters: Stories from the Raymond and Patsy Nasher Collection: September 20, 2008 – January 4, 2009
- Jacques Lipchitz: A Gift from the Artist's Estate: June 21 – September 7, 2008
- Beyond the Grasp: Sculpture Transcending the Physical: March 15 – August 31, 2008
- Woman: The Art of Gaston Lachaise: November 17, 2007 – February 17, 2008
- Matisse: Painter as Sculptor: January 21 – April 29, 2007
- On Tour with Renzo Piano Building Workshop: Selected Projects: May 13 – August 213, 2006
- The Women of Giacometti: January 14 – April 19, 2006
- David Smith: Drawing + Sculpting: April 16 – July 17, 2005
- Frank Stella: Painting in Three Dimensions: January 8 – April 3, 2005
- Bodies Past and Present: The Figurative Tradition in the Nasher Collection: September 18, 2004 – August 2005
- Variable States: Three Masterworks of Modern Sculpture: September 18, 2004 – January 2, 2005
- Medardo Rosso: Second Impressions: April 3 – June 20, 2004
- Picasso: The Cubist Portraits of Fernande Olivier: February 15 – May 9, 2004
- From Rodin to Calder: Masterworks of Modern Sculpture from the Nasher Collection: October 20, 2003 – August 22, 2004

=== Nasher XChange ===
To celebrate its 10th anniversary, the Nasher Sculpture Center presented Nasher XChange from October 19, 2013, to February 16, 2014. Nasher Sculpture Center Director Jeremy Strick stated that Nasher XChange focused on public art, which engages the people and culture of Dallas. The Nasher XChange exhibition was made possible in part by an award from the National Endowment for the Arts, Art Works, and a grant from the Texas Commission on the Arts.

- Nasher XChange: Moore to the Point: October 19, 2013 – February 16, 2014
- Nasher XChange: CURTAINS: October 19, 2013 – February 16, 2014
- Nasher XChange: Buried House: October 19, 2013 – February 16, 2014
- Nasher XChange: X: October 19, 2013 – February 16, 2014
- Nasher XChange: Fountainhead: October 19, 2013 – February 16, 2014
- Nasher XChange: Trans.lation: October 19, 2013 – February 16, 2014
- Nasher XChange: Black & Blue: Cultural Oasis in the Hills: October 19, 2013 – February 16, 2014
- Nasher XChange: dear sunset: October 19, 2013 – February 16, 2014
- Nasher XChange: Flock in Space: October 19, 2013 – February 16, 2014
- Nasher XChange: Music (Everything I know I learned the day my son was born): October 19, 2013 – February 16, 2014
- Nasher XChange: Through the Eyes of Allison V. Smith: October 19, 2013 – February 16, 2014

== Nasher Prize ==
The Nasher Prize was established in April 2015. The award is dedicated exclusively to a living artist who has proven excellence in contemporary sculpture.

- (2016) – Doris Salcedo

Doris Salcedo was born in 1958 in Bogotá, Colombia, her current residence. Salcedo has created sculptures and installations that transform familiar, everyday objects into moving and powerful testimonies of loss and remembrance.

- (2017) – Pierre Huyghe

Huyghe was born in 1962 in Paris, he lives and works in Chile and New York. Huyghe has profoundly expanded the parameters of sculpture through artworks encompassing a variety of materials and disciplines, bringing music, cinema, and dance into contact with biology and philosophy and incorporating time-based elements as diverse as fog, ice, parades, rituals, automata, computer programs, games, dogs, bees, and microorganisms.

- (2018) – Theaster Gates

Gates was born in 1973 in Chicago, Illinois, where he continues to live and work as a professor at the University of Chicago. His work explores the material aspects of memory, history, and place.

- (2019) – Isa Genzken

Genzken was born in 1948 in Germany. Genzken has continually reinvented the language of sculpture by creating objects inspired by popular culture and historical events that explore the complexities of contemporary realism.

- (2020–2021) – Michael Rakowitz

Rakowitz was born in 1973 in Long Island, New York. He is Iraqi-American and much of his work explores his identity as an American artist of Iraqi Jewish descent. His work explores the complex history between the US and Middle East, as well as cultural heritage and humanitarian crisis.

- (2022) – Nairy Baghramian

Baghramian, born 1971, is an Iranian-born German visual artist. Baghramian takes the creation and presentation of sculpture as her de facto subject yet makes works highlighting the poignant, contradictory, and sometimes humorous circumstances that can suffuse both the artistic process as well as everyday life. Over the past three decades, she has explored elements of sculptural practice and installation to create works that challenge their settings and upend expected modes of presentation as well as the architectural, sociological, political, and historical contexts that inform them.

- (2023) – Senga Nengudi

Nengudi was born in 1943 in Chicago and is known for works exploring the body, as well as for combining sculpture and performance. Nengudi rose to prominence among the Black avant-garde of the 1970s and 80s.

== Key people ==
=== Nasher Sculpture Center Board of Trustees ===
- Mr. David Haemisegger, President
- Mr. Stephen Stamas, Chairman
- Mr. Elliot Cattarulla
- Ms. Nancy Nasher Haemisegger
- Mr. John G. Heimann
- Dr. William Jordan
- Dr. Steven A. Nash
- Ms. Andrea Nasher
- Mr. Jeremy Strick

=== The Director ===
- Jeremy Strick, Director

Jeremy Strick has been the Director of the Nasher Sculpture Center since March 2009. Mr. Strick oversees collections, exhibitions, and operations at the 2.4 acre museum located in the heart of downtown Dallas’ Arts District.

=== Curators ===
- Jed Morse, Chief Curator
- Catherine Craft, Curator
- Leigh Arnold, Assistant Curator

=== Nancy A. Nasher and David J. Haemisegger ===
David J. Haemisegger and Nancy A. Nasher serve on the Board of Directors of the Nasher Sculpture Center, a museum founded in 2003 by Nancy's father, Raymond D. Nasher, which houses the Raymond D. and Patsy R. Nasher Collection of Modern and Contemporary Sculpture. Nancy worked closely with her father on the creation and development of the Sculpture Center. David currently serves as President of the Nasher Sculpture Center, and is on the Finance and Audit Committees. David and Nancy serve on the Nasher Foundation Board.

== See also ==
- List of buildings and structures in Dallas, Texas
