= Esopus (magazine) =

American annual arts magazine

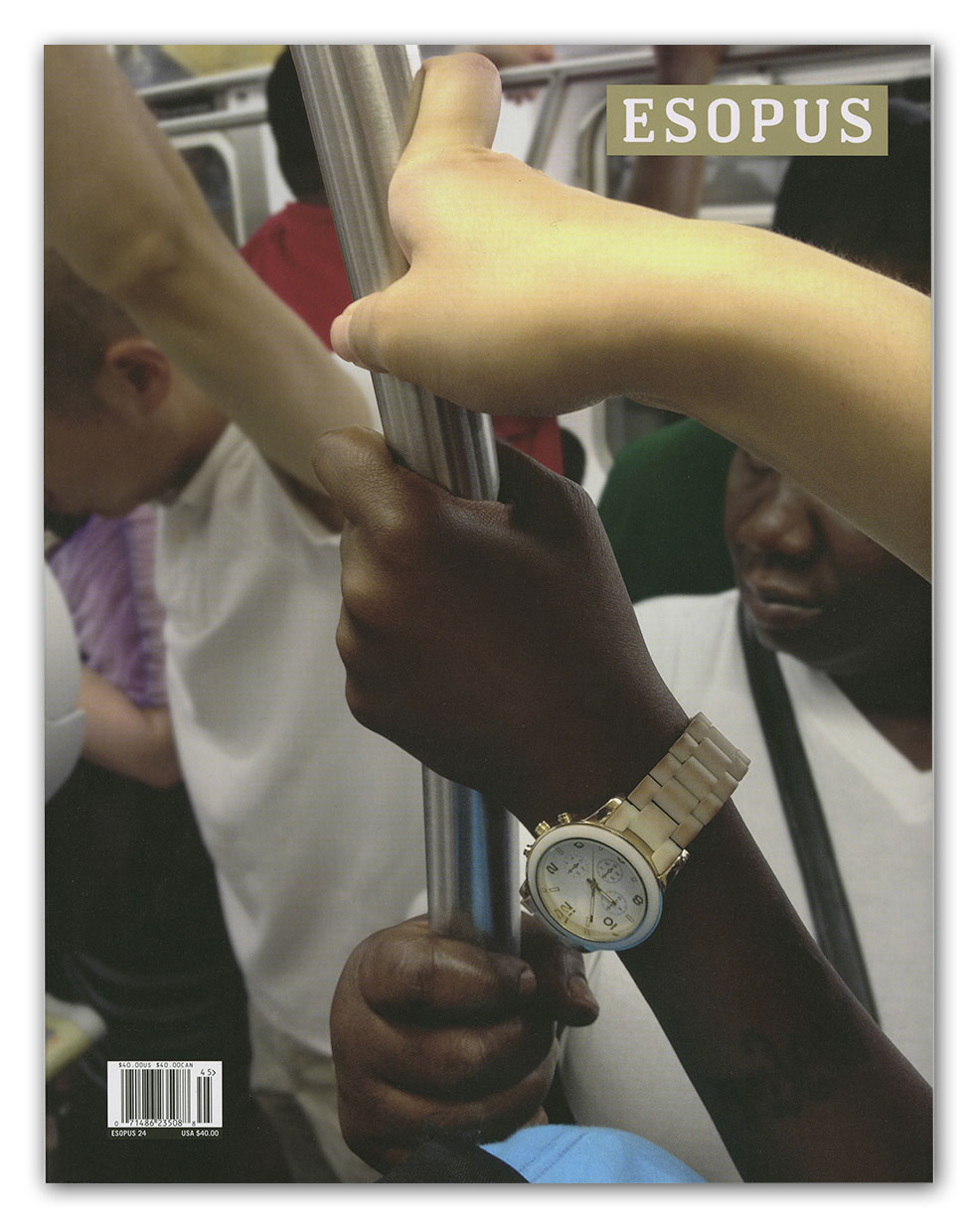
- Cover of Esopus 24
- Frequency: Annual
- Publisher: Esopus Foundation Ltd.
- Founder: Tod Lippy
- Founded: 2003
- Final issue: Fall 2018
- Country: USA
- Based in: Brooklyn, NY
- Language: English
- ISSN: 1545-9306

Esopus was a Brooklyn, New York–based annual arts and culture publication founded by Tod Lippy in 2003 and published by the Esopus Foundation Ltd., a 501(c)(3) non-profit organization. Originally a semiannual publication, it switched to an annual format in 2013. Esopus featured content from a wide variety of creative disciplines, including artists' projects, critical writing, fiction, poetry, visual essays, interviews, and music—all presented in an unmediated format, with minimal editorial framing and no advertising. It ceased publication in Fall 2018.

== Mission and history ==
The primary objective of Esopus was to give artists a noncommercial forum in which to publish their work, while simultaneously offering readers the opportunity to access a wide range of cultural expression. Each issue of Esopus featured six long-form artists' projects, commissioned from well-known figures such as Edward Ruscha, Jenny Holzer, Anish Kapoor, and Mickalene Thomas, as well as from emerging artists. These projects have taken the form of removable posters, booklets, inserts, and pop-up sculptures, and are often printed using specialty inks, varnishes, and paper stocks. Esopus partnered with institutions such as The Museum of Modern Art Archives, the Magnum Photos Archive, and the New York Public Library to present continuing series that reproduce never-before-seen archival materials, often in facsimile. Contents also regularly include essays on process by creative professionals such as Mad Men creator Matthew Weiner, choreographer Christopher Wheeldon, translator Ann Goldstein and cruciverbalist David Quarfoot. Esopus has featured essays by Karl Ove Knausgaard and Francine Prose; scripts by Stephen Adly Guirgis, Christopher Durang, and Hampton Fancher; and fiction by a dozen previously unpublished authors (many of whom, such as Vivien Shotwell and Stuart Nadler, have gone on to publish novels with major houses).

Other contents included portfolios debuting the work of undiscovered artists such as Mark Hogancamp, Alex Masket, and Samuel Varkovitsky; commentary by museum guards about the artworks they oversee; a series called "100 Frames" that features still images from films by Chantal Akerman, Claire Denis, Charles Burnett, David Lynch, and many others; and a CD of new music in every issue commissioned according to a particular theme. Past contributors to Esopus CDs included Jens Lekman, Grizzly Bear, Neko Case, Kimya Dawson, Kate Pierson, Cloud Nothings, Busdriver, and Ryan Adams.

== Esopus Space, events and exhibitions ==
In June 2009, a capacity-building grant from the Andy Warhol Foundation for the Visual Arts enabled the Esopus Foundation to move into a combined office and exhibition space in New York's Greenwich Village called Esopus Space. Over the course of three years, Tod Lippy curated 18 exhibitions and programmed 30 events in the space. Exhibitions included "Ray and Bob Box", "Picturing Marwencol: Photographs by Mark Hogancamp", and "Bryan Nash Gill: What Was Will Be Again"; and events ranged from concerts by Sam Amidon and Nina Nastasia to a screening with the late experimental filmmaker Peter Hutton. Since its founding, Esopus has regularly programmed events with institutional partners such as the New York Public Library, the Museum of the Moving Image, and The Kitchen. Lippy has curated Esopus-related exhibitions at White Columns, including the first public exhibition of the work of Mark Hogancamp, and Pioneer Works .

== Critical reception ==
Esopus was called "a thing of lavish, eccentric beauty, less flipped through than stared at, forcing readers to reconcile their expectations of what a magazine is with the strange artifact in their laps," by The New York Times's David Carr. Design critic and historian Steven Heller claimed Esopus "stands along with Dave Eggers' McSweeney's for its driving cultural significance" on theatlantic.com, and ARTNews editor Andrew Russeth stated, "Once a year, a truly beautiful thing occurs in the bookstores of all 50 United States: new copies of Esopus arrive. Esopus is a freewheeling treasure trove of a book, sumptuously designed and filled with often-elaborate projects by artists, writers, and others, as well as the results of deep dives into tantalizing archives." In the December 2018 issue of Artforum, artist Kerry James Marshall wrote, "Esopus was the best and most extravagant platform for artists’ projects that I knew of. There seemed to be no restrictions on what it was willing to do, and the results were of the highest quality." Esopus received Specific Object's "Publication of the Year" award in 2007, and it was the subject of dedicated exhibitions at de Appel Art Center, Amsterdam, in 2016 and Nasher Sculpture Center in Dallas in 2017..

== Suspension of publication ==
In the fall of 2018, Esopus editor Tod Lippy announced that the Esopus Foundation would be suspending publication of Esopus after 25 issues. The Foundation continues to publish books and limited editions and program free events throughout New York City with longtime institutional partners including the Museum of Modern Art, the Museum of the Moving Image, The Kitchen, and Pioneer Works. Since 2019, it has actively pursued the donation/distribution of all available back issues to underserved public, community, and prison libraries throughout the U.S.

== Esopus Books ==
In 2019, the Esopus Foundation announced the formation of Esopus Books, an imprint focused on publishing artist monographs, art catalogs, and other publications. Its first book was Neil Goldberg: Other People's Prescriptions, which was launched at MoMA PS1 in April 2019. In May 2020, Esopus Books published Modern Artifacts, which featured all 18 installments of the eponymous series that appeared in issues of Esopus from 2006 to 2019. The volume appeared on "best of the year" lists from The New York Times, The Los Angeles Times, The Brooklyn Rail, and New York magazine, whose critic, Jerry Saltz, called the book "Incredible...a new scriptorium of art." The Esopus Reader, a hardback anthology of written contributions to Esopus, appeared in February 2022 to critical acclaim.
