= Welcome to Marwen =

2018 film by Robert Zemeckis

- Theatrical release poster
- Directed by: Robert Zemeckis
- Screenplay by: Robert Zemeckis; Caroline Thompson
- Produced by: Jack Rapke; Steve Starkey; Robert Zemeckis
- Starring: Steve Carell; Leslie Mann; Diane Kruger; Merritt Wever; Janelle Monáe; Eiza González; Gwendoline Christie; Leslie Zemeckis; Siobhan Williams; Neil Jackson
- Cinematography: C. Kim Miles
- Edited by: Jeremiah O'Driscoll
- Music by: Alan Silvestri
- Production companies: Universal Pictures; DreamWorks Pictures; ImageMovers; Perfect World Pictures
- Distributed by: Universal Pictures
- Release date: December 21, 2018 (United States)
- Running time: 116 minutes
- Country: United States
- Language: English
- Budget: $39–50 million
- Box office: $13.1 million

Welcome to Marwen is a 2018 American live-action/animated drama film directed by Robert Zemeckis, who co-wrote the script with Caroline Thompson. It is inspired by Jeff Malmberg's 2010 documentary Marwencol. The film stars Steve Carell, Leslie Mann, Diane Kruger, Merritt Wever, Janelle Monáe, Eiza González, Gwendoline Christie, Leslie Zemeckis, Siobhan Williams and Neil Jackson. It tells the true story of Mark Hogancamp, a man struggling with PTSD who, after being almost fatally physically assaulted, creates a fictional village to ease his trauma.

Welcome to Marwen was released by Universal Pictures on December 21, 2018. It received polarized response from critics who praised the animated segments and performances, particularly Carell's, but criticized the inconsistent tone and screenplay. The film grossed only $13.1 million worldwide, becoming a box-office bomb.

== Plot ==
A World War II Curtiss P-40 warplane piloted by a doll-like figure is hit by enemy fire and forced to ditch. The pilot's shoes are burned in the landing and he finds women's shoes, which he wears instead. The pilot is confronted by doll-like German soldiers, who taunt him for wearing women's shoes. The Germans threaten to emasculate him, but are killed by a group of doll-like women who come to the pilot's rescue and protect him.

It is revealed that the scenario is part of an elaborate fantasy created by Mark Hogancamp, using modified fashion dolls in a model village named Marwen. Mark imagines that the dolls are alive and photographs his fantasies to help him cope with acute memory loss and post-traumatic stress disorder from a brutal attack he suffered some time earlier, when he drunkenly told a group of white supremacists that he was a cross-dresser.

The dolls correspond to people that he knows in real life: himself as "Cap'n Hogie", the pilot; various female friends as his protectors; and his attackers as German Nazi soldiers. The main villain of Marwen Dejah Thoris, a teal-haired Belgian witch, is obsessed with Hogie to the point where she would send any woman who gets too close to him 15,000,000 lightyears into the future with her magic.

Mark finally agrees to appear in court to deliver a victim impact statement after much coaxing from his attorney and friends, but upon seeing his attackers, he imagines them as Nazi soldiers shooting at him, and becomes terrified and flees, causing Judge Martha J. Harter to postpone the hearing.

Mark falls in love with a woman named Nicol who has just moved in across the street, whom he has added to his fantasy. Mark imagines that the doll Nicol is in love with Cap'n Hogie, and that they get married. In real life, Mark proposes marriage to Nicol, who tells him she wishes to remain only friends. Mark is distraught and contemplates suicide.

In his fantasies, Nicol is shot by a Nazi, who in turn is killed by Cap'n Hogie but brought back to life, along with other Nazi soldiers, by Deja Thoris. Cap'n Hogie realizes that Deja Thoris is both a Nazi spy and the personification of Mark's addiction to the pills that he thought were helping him, but were actually hurting him. Hogie saves Mark by vanquishing Dejah 15,000,000 lightyears into the future, never to be seen again. Mark pours the pills down the sink and vows to break his addiction to them.

Mark attends the rescheduled hearing and delivers his statement. That evening he also attends the exhibition of his work and makes a date with his friend Roberta, who is a sales clerk at the hobby store where he is a frequent customer. The film ends with a photograph of the real Mark Hogancamp, who has a successful career as a photographer.

== Cast ==
Most of the cast appears both as characters in the "real world", and as characters in the Marwen world that Mark created, using motion-capture and lending their voice for the animated character.

Actor	Real world character (live-action)	Marwen character (voice and motion-capture)
Steve Carell	Mark Hogancamp, an aspiring artist who was beaten nearly to death by five neo-Nazi perpetrators for expressing his inclination towards wearing and collecting high-heeled shoes, and creates a miniature village called Marwen (later called Marwencol).	Cap'n Hogie, a heroic pilot.
Leslie Mann	Nicol, Mark's new neighbor.	A new addition to the village who starts a romance with Hogie.
Diane Kruger	None, but Dejah's revealed to be the personification of Mark's addiction to the pills he takes.	Deja Thoris, the Belgian Witch of Marwen who curses Hogie and is secretly a Nazi spy.
Merritt Wever	Roberta, a kind friend of Mark who works at the hobby shop where he buys the models and toy figurines he uses to build Marwen.	A member of Hogie's team who uses heavy artillery.
Janelle Monáe	Julie, a social worker who befriends Mark while in rehab.	G.I. Julie, a veteran in Hogie's team.
Eiza González	Carlala, Mark's friend at the bar where he has a part-time job.	A member of Hogie's team who drives their jeep.
Gwendoline Christie	Anna, Mark's Russian caretaker.	A Soviet member of Hogie's team.
Leslie Zemeckis	Suzette, Mark's favorite actress.	A French member of Hogie's team.
Siobhan Williams		Elsa, a French milkmaid whom Hogie saves. He brings her into his team, but she is soon killed by a Nazi.
Neil Jackson	Kurt, Nicol's rough and poorly mannered ex-boyfriend. Kurt mistakenly believes Mark is a neo-Nazi and calls him a "pedophile" after seeing a Nazi soldier doll in the Marwen scene in Mark's front yard.	General Meyer, a member of the Schutzstaffel in Marwen.
Falk Hentschel	Louis, one of the white supremacists who assaulted Mark.	Hauptsturmführer Ludwig Topf, Deja Thoris's henchman in Marwen and a Nazi leader.
Matt O'Leary	Carl, one of the white supremacists who assaulted Mark.	Lt. Benz, a Nazi soldier in Marwen.
Nikolai Witschl	Rudy, one of the white supremacists that assaulted Mark.	Rudolph, a Nazi soldier in Marwen.
Patrick Roccas	Stevie, one of the white supremacists who assaulted Mark.	Stefan, a Nazi soldier in Marwen.
Alexander Lowe	Vern, one of the white supremacists who assaulted Mark.	Werner, a Nazi soldier in Marwen.
Eric Keenleyside	Larry, Mark's friend.	A Marwen Friar.
Stefanie von Pfetten	Wendy, a woman who worked at the bar and found Mark after he had been beaten. Mark named MARWEN by combining the names MARk and WENdy. (Wendy does not appear in the film in the "real world", only referenced.)	Wendy, a woman who once saved Cap'n Hogie, but has been gone from Marwen.
Conrad Coates	Demaryius Johnson, Mark's attorney.	
Veena Sood	Judge Martha J. Harter, the judge who oversees the hearing of the white supremacists who attacked Mark.	

Ulster County Sheriffs portrayed by Fraser Aitcheson, Trevor Jones, Brad Kelly, Jeff Sanca, and Patrick Sabongui.

== Production ==
On April 28, 2017, it was announced that Robert Zemeckis would next direct an untitled drama film that would star Steve Carell. On May 19, 2017, it was reported that Leslie Mann and Janelle Monáe had joined the cast, and on May 23, 2017, Eiza González was also added. In June 2017, Diane Kruger joined the cast to portray a villain, while Gwendoline Christie had also signed on. In July 2017, Merritt Wever and Neil Jackson joined the cast of the film. On August 6, 2017, the studio hired German actor Falk Hentschel to play the role of a villain, Hauptsturmführer Ludwig Topf, a Nazi captain to a squad of SS Storm Troopers who terrify the people of Marwen. On August 21, 2017, the director's wife, Leslie Zemeckis, was cast in the film; she plays an actress in a pornographic film that Hogancamp watches, and her Marwen counterpart.

Principal photography on the film began in Vancouver, British Columbia, Canada, on August 14, 2017, and was completed around October 19, 2017.

In June 2018, the film was officially titled Welcome to Marwen.

The film portrayed Hogancamp's attackers as having been neo-Nazis who were well into their adult years. However, in actuality, Hogancamp's attackers were neither neo-Nazis nor mature; two of the five attackers were teenagers at the time, and the sixteen year old was a Black person.

== Music ==
The film's soundtrack was scored, composed, and conducted by Alan Silvestri.

== Release ==
Theatrical

The film was released in the United States by Universal Pictures on December 21, 2018. The studio spent $60 million on prints and advertising for the film. The original plan was to spend $120 million, but after early test screenings went poorly, costs were cut.

Home media

The film was released on Digital HD on March 26, 2019, followed by a Blu-ray and DVD release on April 9, 2019.

== Reception ==
=== Box office ===
Welcome to Marwen grossed $10.8 million in the United States and Canada, and $2.3 million in other territories, for a worldwide total of $13.1 million, against a production budget of around $39 million.

In the United States and Canada, the film was released alongside Aquaman, Second Act and Bumblebee, and was projected to gross $7–9 million from 1,900 theaters over its five-day opening weekend. After making $909,000 on its first day (including $190,000 from Thursday night previews), three-day weekend estimates were lowered to $3 million. The film went on to debut to $2.4 million for the weekend, finishing ninth and marking the worst opening of Zemeckis' career. It then made $490,000 on Monday and $1.3 million on Christmas Day for an "awful" five-day total gross of $4.1 million. Following its low opening, insiders estimated the film would lose Universal $50–60 million, the second straight week the studio released a film that was a box-office bomb, following Mortal Engines. The film made $2.2 million in its second weekend, dropping 5%.

=== Critical response ===
On review aggregator website Rotten Tomatoes, the film has an approval rating of 33% based on 171 reviews and an average score of 4.90/10. The website's critical consensus reads, "Welcome to Marwen has dazzling effects and a sadly compelling story, but the movie's disjointed feel and clumsy screenplay make this invitation easy to decline." On Metacritic, the film has a weighted average score of 40 out of 100, based on 38 critics, indicating "mixed or average reviews". Audiences polled by CinemaScore gave the film an average grade of "B−" on an A+ to F scale, while those at PostTrak gave it a 57% overall positive score and a 37% "definite recommend".

The film was largely panned, drawing unfavorable comparisons to the documentary original. Writing for IndieWire, David Ehrlich gave the film a "C" and wrote, "In trying to celebrate the healing powers of art, Zemeckis has created a sometimes fun, often morbidly compelling, and always ill-advised testament to the ways in which those healing powers can create problems of their own." Michael Phillips of the Chicago Tribune gave the film 1.5 out of 4 stars and said, "The way Zemeckis shapes these stop-motion animation scenes, they're meant to be exciting, funny, scary, a little of everything. But they whack the movie completely off-kilter. We lose the strange, quiet intimacy of Hogancamp's careful manipulation of this world. The real-life scenes don’t feel like Hogancamp's real life; they feel like a Hollywood falsification of it, despite Carell's and Mann's valiant efforts."

Contrarily, Richard Roeper of The Chicago Sun-Times praised the film, giving it 3.5/4 stars and saying, "Leave it to the innovative and greatly skilled veteran director Robert Zemeckis to deliver a beautiful and endearingly eccentric movie based on the life and the imagination of Mark Hogancamp. And leave it to the chameleon everyman Steve Carell to deliver a subtle, layered, empathetic and memorable portrayal of Mark — both the man and the doll."

Glenn Garner, writing in Out, noted that "Zemeckis’ film surprisingly features a prominent and respectful depiction of Hogancamp's gender expansive dress, making it a potentially valuable form of representation for gender nonconforming viewers. It seems a missed opportunity as that detail was largely omitted from the film's marketing."

=== Accolades ===
Award	Date of ceremony	Category	Recipient(s)	Result	Ref.
Visual Effects Society Awards	February 5, 2019	Outstanding Visual Effects in a Photoreal Feature	Kevin Baillie, Sandra Scott, Seth Hill, Marc Chu, James Paradis	Nominated	
Visual Effects Society Awards	February 5, 2019	Outstanding Virtual Cinematography in a Photoreal Project	C. Kim Miles, Matthew Ward, Ryan Beagan, Marc Chu for "Town of Marwen"	Nominated	
Visual Effects Society Awards	February 5, 2019	Outstanding Compositing in a Photoreal Feature	Woei Lee, Saul Galbiati, Max Besner, Thai-Son Doan	Nominated	
Art Directors Guild Awards	February 2, 2019	Excellence in Production Design for a Contemporary Film	Stefan Dechant	Nominated	
Make-Up Artists and Hair Stylists Guild Awards	January 10, 2019	Best Contemporary Make-Up	Ve Neill and Rosalina Da Silva	Nominated	
Canadian Society of Cinematographers Awards	April 30, 2019	CSC Award for Theatrical Feature Cinematography	C. Kim Miles	Nominated	
Leo Awards	June 4, 2019	Best Cinematography in a Motion Picture	C. Kim Miles	Won	
Leo Awards	June 4, 2019	Best Sound in a Motion Picture	Chris Duesterdiek	Won	
World Soundtrack Awards	August 12, 2019	Film Composer of the Year	Alan Silvestri	Nominated	
