= Mike Meinardus =

Mike Meinardus is a special effects supervisor. He was co-nominated for the Academy Award for Best Visual Effects for Kong: Skull Island.
