= Marwencol (art installation) =

Artwork of a scale model town

Marwencol is a miniature town in Kingston, New York created by the American artist Mark Hogancamp (born c. 1961/1962).

On April 8, 2000, Mark Hogancamp was attacked outside of a bar by five men who beat him nearly to death after he drunkenly told them he was a cross-dresser. After nine days in a coma and 40 days in the hospital, Hogancamp was discharged with brain damage that left him little memory of his previous life. Previously, Hogancamp had served in the United States Navy and had dealt with bouts of alcoholism and a divorce. An avid drawer, he worked as a carpenter designing retail showrooms for a lighting company in the early 1990s that drew war scenes in his spare time; as a result of the damage to the left side of his brain, he lost the ability to draw, although his previous drawings and diary entries helped save him from having no record of his previous life. All five men were convicted, although only three served jail time. Due to his Medicaid running out, he returned home but could not afford psychiatric counseling due to not having coverage for it.

Unable to afford therapy, he created his own memory by building a 1/6-scale World War II-era Belgian town in his yard and populating it with action figures representing himself, his friends, and even his attackers. He called the town "Marwencol", blending his own name with that of a local bartender Wendy and his neighbor Colleen.

Hogancamp was initially discovered by photographer David Naugle, who documented and shared his story with Esopus magazine, whereby his work was shown in White Columns art gallery.

== In media ==
The film Marwencol (also known as Village of the Dolls in the UK) is a 2010 American documentary film that explores Hogancamp's life and work. It is the debut feature of director-editor Jeff Malmberg. It was the inspiration for Welcome to Marwen, a 2018 drama directed by Robert Zemeckis and starring Steve Carell as Hogancamp.

Welcome to Marwencol is a 2015 art book by Hogancamp and Chris Shellen, published by Princeton Architectural Press, that documents Hogancamp's life and work. It was named one of the best books of 2015 by Amazon.com.
