= Giuseppe Panza =

Italian art collector (1923–2010)

Giuseppe Panza di Biumo (23 March 1923 – 24 April 2010) was a collector of modern art. He lived in Milan and Varese, Italy.

== Life and work ==
Giuseppe Panza was born on March 23, 1923, in Milan. His father, Ernesto, was a wine distributor who invested in real estate and in 1940 was given the title of count by King Vittorio Emanuele III. He earned a law degree at the University of Milan in 1948 but never practiced. Instead, he built his career in the family businesses of wine distribution and property.

Panza died on 24 April 2010 in Milan.

== Art collection ==
Along with his wife Rosa Giovanna, Panza began building an art collection in 1956, when he bought a work by Antoni Tàpies. By 1999, the collection had 2,500 works. The collection was described by Panza as having three parts:

- 1) 80 works acquired between 1956 and 1962, all sold to MOCA, LA
- 2) works of Minimal, Conceptual and Environmental art, most of which went to the Guggenheim
- 3) art purchased between 1987 and 1999, described as, "the largest part of the collection, built up during a particularly favorable period.". 70 of these works were given to MOCA LA.

Initially, they focused on European and American painting and sculpture of the mid-1940s through early 1960s, purchasing works by European postwar artists such as Jean Fautrier and Tàpies, and American Abstract Expressionists such as Franz Kline and Mark Rothko. They were also among the first patrons of Pop art, purchasing 11 of Robert Rauschenberg’s “combines” of the mid-1950s, as well as works by Roy Lichtenstein, Claes Oldenburg, and James Rosenquist.

In 1966 the Panzas turned their attention to Minimalist and Conceptual Art. They were among the first to acquire the works of Hanne Darboven, Brice Marden, Robert Morris, Bruce Nauman, Robert Ryman, Richard Serra, James Turrell, Lawrence Weiner, Joseph Kosuth, and many other major artists.

In a 1989 article titled “Una stanza per Panza,” Donald Judd accused Panza of fabricating Judd works from sketches he owned without the artist's permission — let alone participation — and then installing them at his ancestral home at Villa Varese. Other conceptual artists, including Flavin and Nauman, also took issue with some of the pieces that Panza had constructed from sketches.

=== Distribution of the Panza Collection ===
When Panza began disposing of some of his collection in the 1980s, he first tried to do so in his homeland, Italy. After Turin had rejected it on the grounds of its American content, he turned to other international museums. In 1982, plans with Werner Schmalenbach of selling his collection to the Kunstsammlung Nordrhein-Westfalen failed due to cuts in the museum's budget.

Panza then arranged important gift and loan deals that greatly enhanced the collections of several American museums. In 1984, Panza sold 80 abstract Expressionist and pop works to the Museum of Contemporary Art, Los Angeles, whose founding director Pontus Hultén he had known since 1963 and at which he served as a trustee. The works were acquired for $11 million and formed the core of the museum's permanent collection soon after it opened in 1983. In 1994, Panza donated 70 items to MOCA by 10 young, local artists, including major sculptures by internationally known artist Robert Therrien. The MOCA LA donation was, according to Panza, seven works by each of ten artists: Lawrence Carroll, Greg Colson, Jeff Colson, Ron Griffin. Roy Thurston, Mark Lere, Gregory Mahoney. Ross Rudel, Peter Shelton, and Robert Therrien. .

Spearheaded by Guggenheim's then-director Thomas Krens, who had been in discussion with Panza in 1986 during his tenure at Williams College Museum of Art, the Guggenheim, acquired, in a combined gift and purchase arrangement, more than 300 Minimalist sculptures and paintings in 1991 and 1992. Some of them were not purchased as physical objects but as Conceptual sculptures to be constructed from site to site. In order to pay for the $30 million package, Krens initiated a controversial deaccession plan, selling works by the likes of Wassily Kandinsky, Marc Chagall, and Amedeo Modigliani at Sotheby's in May 1990 for $47 million at the height of that art boom.

In 2008, the Hirshhorn Museum and Sculpture Garden made an acquisition of thirty-nine works from the Panza collection including multiple pieces by Joseph Kosuth, Robert Irwin, Robert Barry, Hamish Fulton, and On Kawara, among others. That same year, the Albright-Knox Art Gallery acquired 71 artworks by 15 artists, partly as a gift from the Panza family and through funds from the museum's special endowment for art acquisitions.

In 2010, the San Francisco Museum of Modern Art acquired 25 of the remaining major works of Conceptual and Minimalist art from Panza's collection for an undisclosed price. Part gift from SFMOMA Trustees and part museum purchase, the acquisition included major works by Bruce Nauman, Robert Barry, Joseph Beuys, Hanne Darboven, Douglas Huebler, Joseph Kosuth, and Lawrence Weiner.

About 10 per cent of his 2,500-piece collection remains in the 18th-century Villa Menafoglio Litta Panza at Varese outside Milan, where the Panzas installed an ever-changing show. The building has 50,000 square feet (4,600 m^{2}) of exhibition space and site-specific works by artists including James Turrell, Robert Irwin and Dan Flavin. Other artists shown in Varese include Ruth Ann Fredenthal, Allan Graham, Ford Beckman, and David Simpson. Panza's archive is divided between Lugano, Switzerland, and the Getty Research Institute in Los Angeles.

== Legacy ==
Giuseppe Panza: Memories of a Collector, an autobiographical perspective on Panza's role as a collector was published by Abbeville Press in 2007. At the Venice Biennale in 2011, artist Barry X Ball installed nine marble sculptures depicting Panza's head in different scales and surfaces at Ca' Rezzonico.

== Sources ==
- Giuseppe Panza, Memories of a Collector, Abbeville Press, New York, 2008. ISBN 978-0-7892-0943-6
- Kenneth Baker, Cornelia H. Butler, Rebecca Morse and Giuseppe Panza, Panza: The Legacy of a Collector, Museum of Contemporary Art, Los Angeles, 1999. ISBN 978-0-9143-5773-5
