= California State University, Bakersfield =

Public university in Bakersfield, California, US

- Former names: California State College, Bakersfield (1971–1982)
- Motto: `Runners on the rise!
- Type: Public university
- Established: 1965; 61 years ago
- Parent institution: California State University
- Accreditation: WSCUC
- Endowment: $42.7 million (2024)
- Budget: $178.8 million (2023–24)
- President: Vernon B. Harper Jr.
- Provost: Deborah Thien
- Faculty: 691 (fall 2022)
- Administrative staff: 590 (fall 2022)
- Students: 10,664 (fall 2024)
- Undergraduates: 9,115 (fall 2024)
- Postgraduates: 1,549 (fall 2024)
- Location: Bakersfield, California, United States; 35.350°N 119.104°W
- Campus: 375 acres (152 ha); Large city
- Other campuses: Lancaster
- Newspaper: The Runner
- Colors: Blue and gold
- Nickname: Roadrunners
- Sporting affiliations: NCAA Division I – Big West; MPSF; Pac-12
- Website: csub.edu

California State University, Bakersfield (CSUB, Cal State Bakersfield, or CSU Bakersfield) is a public university in Bakersfield, California, United States. It was established in 1965 as Kern State College and officially in 1968 as California State College Bakersfield on a 375-acre (152 ha) campus, becoming the 20th school in the California State University system. The university offers 39 different bachelor's degree programs, 17 master's degree programs, and a doctoral program in Educational Leadership (Ed.D.).

As of fall 2021, there were more than 11,000 undergraduate and graduate students at either the main campus in Bakersfield or the satellite campus, Antelope Valley Center in Lancaster, California. CSU Bakersfield has more than 59,000 alumni from its four schools: Arts and Humanities; Business and Public Administration; Natural Sciences, Mathematics and Engineering; and Social Sciences and Education. The university is primarily a commuter campus serving the city of Bakersfield. CSU Bakersfield's petroleum geology program is the only one offered by a public university west of the Rockies. The university is a Hispanic-serving institution. Alumni include local, state, and federal politicians, including one former Speaker of the United States House of Representatives.

== History ==
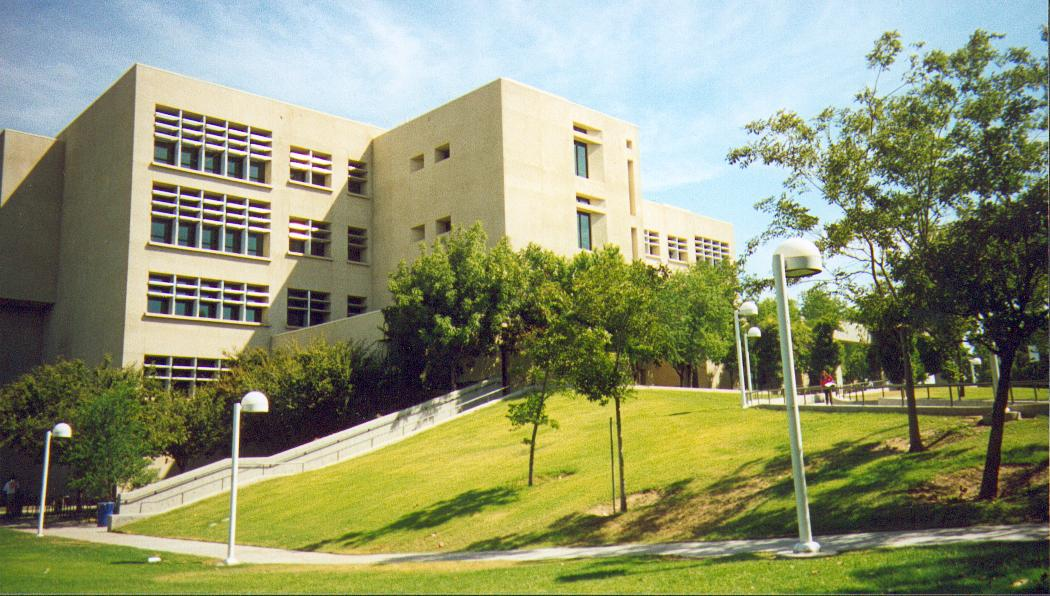
The Walter Stiern Library, CSUB

CSUB owes its founding to the Donahoe Higher Education Act of 1960, which formalized the creation of the CSU system, initially as the "California State Colleges" system. The areas in the southern San Joaquin Valley had been demanding a four-year university since the 1950s. After considering several locations, including nearby Delano and parts of Kings and Tulare County, a steering committee decided on Bakersfield because it was the largest isolated metropolitan area in the United States without a four-year university at that time. Their decision was turned into a bill by Bakersfield's State Senator Walter W. Stiern, ratified by the California State Legislature and signed into law by Governor Pat Brown.

Under these rules, the school was authorized as Kern State College, in 1965, and founded as California State College, Bakersfield in 1968. First classes were held on October 1, 1970. In 1982, the California State College system became the California State University system. The school changed to its present name in 1988, when it was granted university status.

=== Presidents ===
- Paul F. Romberg (1967–1973)
- Jacob P. Frankel (1974–1983)
- Tomás A. Arciniega (1983–2004)
- Horace Mitchell (2004–2018)
- Lynnette Zelezny (2018–2023)
- Vernon B. Harper (2024–present)

== Academics ==
Undergraduate admission statistics
| | Fall 2025 | Fall 2024 | Fall 2023 | Fall 2022 | Fall 2021 |
|---|---|---|---|---|---|
First-time Freshmen
| Applicants | 14,532 | 14,593 | 14,408 | 14,156 | 12,334 |
| Admits | 12,230 | 12,416 | 12,303 | 11,973 | 10,510 |
| Admit rate | 84% | 85% | 85% | 85% | 85% |
| Enrolled | 1,366 | 1,294 | 1,204 | 1,107 | 1,165 |
| Yield rate | 11% | 10% | 10% | 9% | 11% |
Transfers
| Applicants | 4,782 | 4,468 | 4,037 | 4,628 | 5,501 |
| Admits | 3,394 | 3,883 | 3,275 | 4,001 | 3,370 |
| Admit rate | 71% | 87% | 81% | 86% | 61% |
| Enrolled | 1,284 | 1,234 | 971 | 1,129 | 978 |
| Yield rate | 38% | 32% | 30% | 28% | 29% |

Cal State Bakersfield academics are grouped into four schools with the exception of interdisciplinary programs:

- School of Arts and Humanities (A&H)
- School of Business and Public Administration (BPA)
- School of Natural Sciences, Mathematics, and Engineering (NSME)
- School of Social Sciences and Education (SSE)

Together, the four schools offer 39 baccalaureate degrees, 17 master's degrees, and one educational doctorate.

Popular majors for undergraduates in 2018 included Business Administration (Management and Operations) at 19.39%, Liberal Arts and Sciences, General Studies and Humanities at 12.82% and Psychology (General) at 8.53%. While popular majors for graduates were Education (General) at 35.28%, Social Work at 20.56% and Student Counseling and Personnel Services at 9.44%.

On May 24, 2019, at the 49th annual undergraduate commencement ceremony, CSU Bakersfield awarded 2,312 bachelor's degrees, a 28% year-over-year increase and a record for the university. On May 22, 2019, 462 graduate degrees, including the university's first 12 doctoral degrees, were awarded at the annual hooding ceremony.

=== Research ===
The Office of Grants, Research, and Sponsored Programs (GRASP) provides administrative support for student and faculty research. External grant funding grew from 2014/15 to 2016/17, with active awards increasing from 54 to 70 and total funding increasing from $10M to $14.7M.

Institutions that have been established as part of university research include:

- Business Research and Education Center
- California Energy Research Center (CERC)
- California Well Sample Repository
- Center for Economic Education and Research (CEER)
- Center for Environmental Studies
- Kegley Institute of Ethics
- Political Research Center

Cal State Bakersfield conducts scientific research using advanced facilities and technologies. Facilities include the Materials Science Engineering Lab, Sediment Analysis Lab, Computer Mapping and Simulation Lab, Plant Physiology Lab, and Elemental Composition Lab, Wireless Communications Lab, Robotics Lab, Power Systems Lab, VLSI/Circuits Lab, Cognitive Processes Lab, Behavioral Neuroscience Lab, Social Cognition Lab, and more. Researchers on campus have access to advanced equipment including scanning electron microscopy, high resolution CAT scanning, and 2D gel electrophoresis.

Active areas of research include synthesizing polymers from renewable resources and geologic CO_{2} storage.

The California Energy Research Center (CERC) was announced in 2013 to foster collaborations between CSUB students, faculty, and the Kern County energy industries. Dr. Alan Fuchs became director of CERC in 2017. The California Energy Research Center will be housed in the 53,000 square-foot Energy and Engineering Innovation Center after its completion in 2023.

=== Rankings ===
Academic rankings

Master's
- Washington Monthly: 28

Regional
- U.S. News & World Report: 31

National
- Forbes: 295
- WSJ/College Pulse: 401-500

2025–2026 U.S. News & World Report Rankings
| Top Public Regional Schools | 18 |
| Top Performers on Social Mobility | 21 |
| Best Undergraduate Engineering Programs (nationwide, at schools where doctorate not offered) | 60 |
| Nursing | 135 |
| Economics in 2024–2025 | 293–318 |

2024–2025 USNWR Graduate School Rankings
| Program | Ranking |
|---|---|
| Social Work | 172 (tie) |
| Public Affairs Programs | 179 (tie) |

- In 2025, ranked 295th out of the top 500 rated private and public colleges and universities in America by Forbes. Also, ranked 137th among public colleges and 70th in the west by Forbes.
- In 2021, ranked 25th for "Top Public Schools" by U.S. News & World Report in the Regional Universities West category.
- In 2021, ranked 28th for schools in "Top Performers on Social Mobility", by U.S. News & World Report in the Regional Universities West category.
- In 2021, ranked tied for 51 in "Regional Universities West", by U.S. News & World Report.
- In 2021, ranked 25 in Best Bang for the Buck, 68th in Master's University by Washington Monthly.
- In 2020, ranked tied for 92st in "Best Undergraduate Engineering Programs" where doctorates not offered, by U.S. News & World Report.
- In 2020, ranked tied for 221st in Undergraduate Nursing where doctorates not offered, by U.S. News & World Report.
- In 2020, ranked tied for 52nd overall out of 127 schools in "Regional Universities West", by U.S. News & World Report.
- In 2020, ranked tied for 24th out of 66 "Top Public Schools" by U.S. News & World Report in the Regional Universities West category.
- In 2020, ranked tied for 31st out of 124 schools in "Top Performers on Social Mobility", by U.S. News & World Report in the Regional Universities West category.
- In 2020, ranked tied for 91st of 220 schools in "Best Undergraduate Engineering Programs" where doctorates not offered, by U.S. News & World Report.
- In 2020, ranked 9th in the "Best Bang for the Buck Colleges" category out of 215 schools in the U.S. western region by Washington Monthly.
- In 2019, ranked 17th out of 606 "Master's Universities" by Washington Monthly based on its contribution to the public good, as measured by social mobility, research, and promoting public service.
- In 2017, ranked 3rd in the nation for upward mobility by The New York Times.
- In 2014, ranked 20th in the United States by Payscale and CollegeNet's Social Mobility Index college rankings.
- In 2014, ranked 39th in the United States by Time magazine in a list of the top 100 universities.

== Athletics ==
CSU Bakersfield is currently an NCAA Division I school. The Roadrunners began the transition process in 2006 and became a full Division I member in July 2010. Following a period as one of a small number of Division I independents, CSU Bakersfield joined the Western Athletic Conference in July 2013 for most sports. For wrestling, CSUB competes in the Pac-12 conference. CSUB wrestling is the institution's original Division-I sport and has placed 3rd (1996) and 8th (1999) in the NCAA D-I Wrestling Championships. The men's and women's basketball teams compete on campus at the Icardo Center.

On June 1, 2006, CSU Bakersfield president, Dr. Horace Mitchell, formally announced that CSUB would raise $6 million over a five-year period for the additional costs for the athletics program. Part of the additional costs were to start a baseball program and a women's golf program. In September 2011, CSUB accepted an invitation to join the Western Athletic Conference for baseball.

Rudy Carvajal was CSUB's athletic director from 1972 until his retirement on December 31, 2010. In 2005, Carvajal received the prestigious CSU Wang Family Award. Under Carvajal's leadership, CSUB has 30 national championships and received the Sears Directors Cup in 1998. Nearly 60,000 people attend NCAA sporting events at CSU Bakersfield.

On May 17, 2007, CSUB announced that Bill Kernen would be the school's first baseball coach, with the school's first official season beginning in spring of 2009.

On January 8, 2011, Jeff Konya assumed the position of athletic director.

Kenneth "Ziggy" Siegfried was named director of athletics on August 20, 2015.

On November 27, 2017, CSUB president Dr. Horace Mitchell announced that CSUB had accepted an invitation to join the Big West Conference. The Roadrunners will remain a member of the Western Athletic Conference until July 1, 2020, at which point it will begin a full membership in the Big West.

=== Athletic achievements ===
==== National Division II championships ====
- Men's basketball: 1993, 1994, 1997
- Men's swimming and diving: 1986–1993, 1998, 2000–2002, 2004
- Wrestling: 1976, 1977, 1979, 1980–1983, 1987
- Men's soccer: 1997
- Softball: 1988, 1989, 1990
- Women's volleyball: 1989
- Women's tennis: 1977 (AIAW)

== Student life ==
Undergraduate demographics as of Fall 2023
| Race and ethnicity | Total |
|---|---|
| Hispanic | 69% |
| White | 12% |
| Asian | 7% |
| Black | 4% |
| Unknown | 4% |
| Two or more races | 2% |
| Foreign national | 1% |
Economic diversity
| Low-income (Note: The percentage of students who received an income-based federal Pell grant intended for low-income students.) | 62% |
| Affluent (Note: The percentage of students who are a part of the American middle class at the bare minimum.) | 38% |

=== Admissions ===
Institutional Research, Planning and Assessment

In fall of 2013, CSUB enrolled its largest freshman class of over 1,300 students. As of fall 2018 CSU Bakersfield has the largest enrollment percentage of unknown Americans and along with CSU Chico the second largest enrollment percentage of Native Americans in the Cal State system.

=== Clubs and organizations ===
CSU Bakersfield has 120 recognized student clubs and organizations (including seven Greek Organizations: Phi Sigma Sigma, Gamma Phi Beta, Nu Phi Chi, Theta Sigma Chi, Kappa Delta Nu, Delta Zeta Tau, and Kappa Sigma) as of spring 2018. Each year, the top juniors, seniors, and graduate students receive membership invitations to join Alpha Chi through the California Iota chapter of the national honor society. The Associated Students Inc. (ASI) is the recognized student government and is known for having an active role on campus. The Bakersfield campus has a Student Union and a 75,000 sq ft (7,000 m^{2}) Recreation Center.

=== Enrollment and dormitories ===
CSUB is predominantly a commuter school, drawing its student body from a mix of recent high school graduates in the local area and working people returning to school or pursuing a degree part-time. While the majority of students live off-campus, the campus dorms can accommodate up to 324 students, or under 5% of the 2002 enrollment figure of 7,700. Space in the dorms has historically been plentiful, with single-occupancy rooms often available and one entire dorm devoted to faculty offices through the mid-1990s. However, space is now impacted and usually fills up quickly. New dorms opened in 2015.

The six buildings comprising the original (West) dorm complex are each named after locations in J. R. R. Tolkien's The Lord of the Rings novel: Rivendell, Rohan, Entwood, Numenor, Dobry, and Lorien. Dorm facilities include a first floor lounge in each building, a dining commons, a swimming pool, a sand volleyball court, a pond, and a parking lot. CSUB has added a new dorm complex called Student Housing East on the northeast end of campus. The original dormitories have been partially repurposed for use as offices.

== Tradition ==
The CSUB Fight Song and Alma Mater were selected through a structured contest initiated by the student government, Associated Students Inc. (ASI). The winner of the Fight Song Contest was a current music student, Gwendolyn Wilcox, and the winner of the Alma Mater Contest was a CSUB alumnus and current high school music instructor, Bill Ingram.

== Notable alumni ==
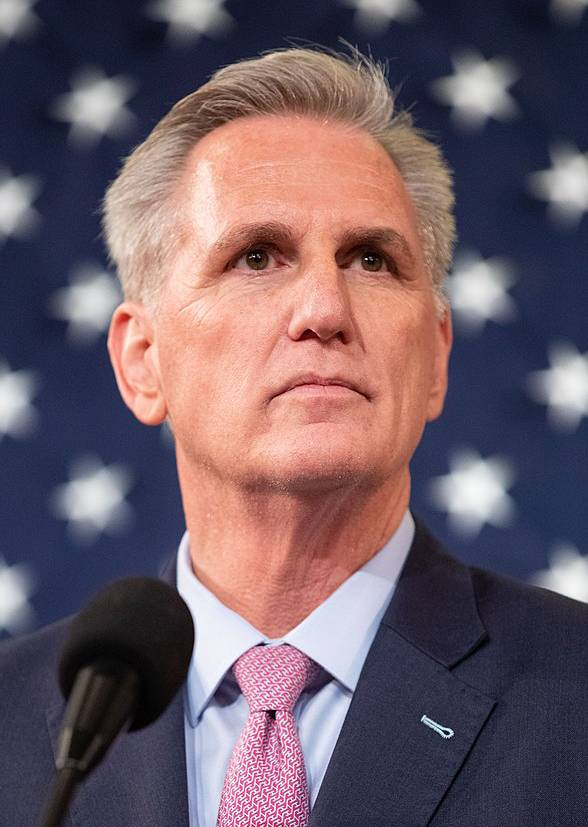
Kevin McCarthy

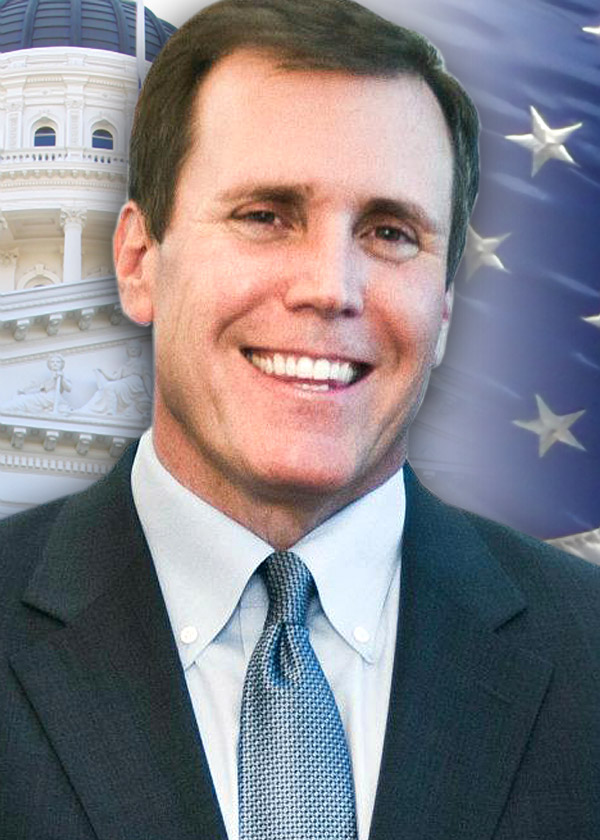
Scott Wilk

- Roy Ashburn, California State Senator – BA in Public Administration, 1983
- John W. Ayers, behavioral epidemiologist – BA, Political Science, 2006
- Vincent Brothers, American mass murderer – MA, Education
- Dushyant Chautala, Indian Politician, Member of Parliament – BS, Business Administration, 2014
- Greg Colson, multimedia artist – BA, Fine Arts 1978
- Jeff Colson, artist, recipient of the Guggenheim Fellowship – BA, Fine Arts 1979
- Austin Davis, Major League Baseball pitcher for the Philadelphia Phillies
- Jeffery Elwell, president of Eastern New Mexico University – BA, English, 1979
- Kathleen O'Neal Gear, archaeologist and author
- Jeremy Gunn, Stanford men's soccer head coach – BS, Business Administration 1993, MBA 1999
- Matt Harris, American screenwriter – BA, English 1991
- Rich Herrera sports radio personality
- Tucker Knight, WWE wrestler
- Brandon Landers, American contemporary artist
- Lyle Martin, first American soccer player to play in the Chinese Super League
- Kevin McCarthy, 55th Speaker of the United States House of Representatives - BS, Marketing, 1989; MBA 1994
- Stephen Neal, New England Patriot, NCAA and world champion wrestler – BS, Physical Education 1999
- Tito Ortiz, mixed martial artist and politician.
- Jennifer L. Thurston, U.S. District Court Judge, Eastern District of California – BS, 1989
- Randy Villegas, U.S. Representative-elect for California's 22nd congressional district
- Scott Wilk California State Senate Minority Leader
- Gyasi Zardes, Major League Soccer player for Columbus Crew SC and member of the United States men's national soccer team
