= Michael Maloney (art dealer) =

American art dealer and appraiser

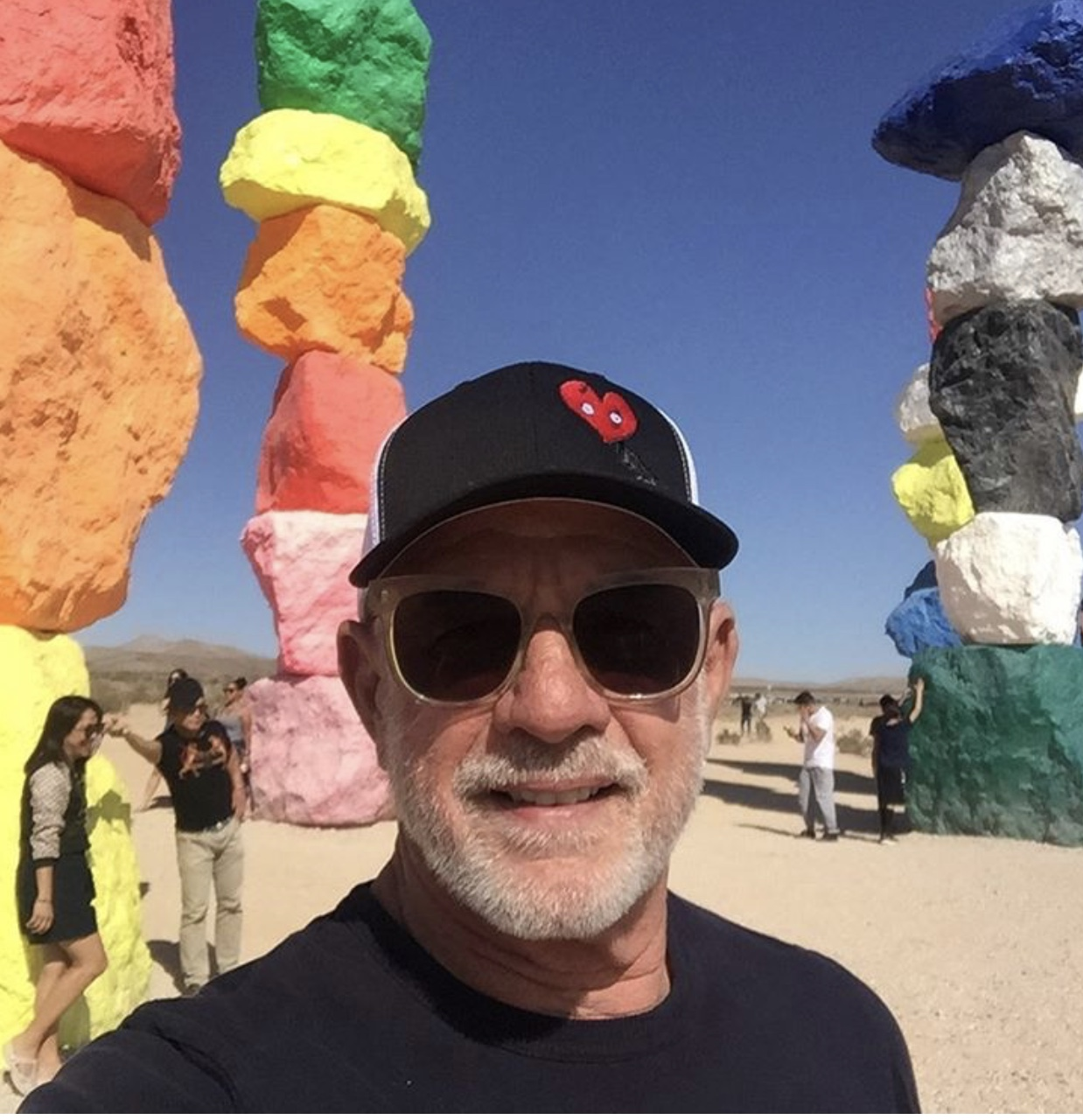
- Born: 1950 (age 75–76); Los Angeles, California, United States
- Education: New York University, ArtCenter College of Design
- Known for: Gallerist, art dealer, art appraisal
- Website: Maloney Art Appraisals

Michael Maloney (born 1950) is an American art dealer, appraiser, and advisor based in Los Angeles, California. He is known for his long-standing contributions to the contemporary art world through his galleries, representation of both emerging and established artists, and work with major art institutions.

== Early life and education ==
Maloney was born in the Silver Lake neighborhood of Los Angeles and raised in Arcadia, California. He studied fine art at the ArtCenter College of Design in Pasadena. After graduation, he moved to the East Coast, where he lived and worked in Boston, Provincetown, and New York City.

== Career ==
Maloney began his art career in 1980 by opening seasonal galleries in Provincetown, Massachusetts. In 1985, he established the Michael Maloney Gallery in Santa Monica, California, which operated until 1990. He later joined the Gagosian Gallery in New York and from 1995 to 2000 served as Director of 20th Century Art at Butterfield & Butterfield (now Bonhams) in California.

In 2005, he founded Maloney Fine Art in Culver City, Los Angeles, which remained active until 2017. Across his career, Maloney opened and operated six gallery spaces—two in Provincetown (1980–1985), two in Santa Monica (1985–1990), and two in Los Angeles (2006–2016).

Since 2017, Maloney has worked independently as a private dealer and appraiser, advising collectors, museums, and institutions throughout the United States.

== Artists and Exhibitions ==
Maloney has exhibited and represented a wide range of artists throughout his career.

=== Established and historical artists ===
John Baldessari, Jean-Michel Basquiat, Mark Bradford, Ford Beckman, James Brown, George Condo, Donald Judd, Keith Haring, Roy Lichtenstein, Agnes Martin, Joan Mitchell, Robert Mapplethorpe, Robert Motherwell, Jorge Pardo, Ed Ruscha, Malick Sidibé, Andy Warhol.

=== Contemporary and emerging artists ===
Jeff Colson, Travis Collinson, Tim Hailand, James Hansen, Roger Herman, Steven Hull, Anthony James, Kim McCarty, Joel Otterson, Claude Simard, George Stoll, John Tottenham, Greta Waller.

His exhibitions have received coverage in publications such as the Los Angeles Times, Art in America, Artillery, LA Weekly, and The Huffington Post.

== Personal life ==
Since returning to California in the mid-1990s, Maloney has been based primarily in Los Angeles. Since 2022, he has divided his time between Los Angeles, and Mérida, the capital of the Mexican state of Yucatán. Maloney first visited the Yucatán Peninsula in 1986, drawn to its archaeological sites and natural landscape, and is currently restoring a historic colonial property in Mérida’s historic center. Several artists he has worked with, including James Brown, Jorge Pardo, and Jeff Colson, have also established studios or residences in the city.

=== Civic Engagement and Philanthropy ===
Maloney has been involved in civic and charitable initiatives throughout his career. He has served on the board of the Mid City Neighborhood Council from 2012 to 2016. He is also a supporter of First Place for Youth and CORE: Southern California Wildfire Relief Efforts. From 2007 to 2017, he collaborated with the founding team of Angel Art, an ongoing annual benefit auction that has raised more than $10 million for Project Angel Food.

A lifelong art collector, Maloney has bought, sold, and collected works by artists he has represented and collaborated with. In 2015 and 2025, he gifted works by Mark Bradford, Ford Beckman, John Sonsini, Helmut Newton, Don Bachardy, and Jeff Colson to the Palm Springs Art Museum. In 2024, he donated works by Mitchell Syrop and Mark Bradford to the Hammer Museum.
