= Jeff Colson =

American artist

Jeff Colson (born 1957) is an American artist.

Colson was born in Santa Ana, California in 1957. He uses diverse materials in painted and sculpted works that reflect both pop and conceptual art. His work often employs trompe l’oeil effects, in which one material creates the effect of a very different material. His work has been exhibited in private and public spaces, and belongs to collections in the United States, Europe, and Mexico. In 2012 he was awarded a John Simon Guggenheim Memorial Foundation fellowship. His brother is artist Greg Colson.

== Solo exhibitions ==
Colson had solo exhibitions at Maloney Fine Art, Los Angeles in 2015 and 2014. In a Los Angeles Times review of former show, Leah Ollman called Colson a "wizard at trompe l’oeil illusion" and "canny subversion," describing his sculpture in wood, resin, paint and urethane, Stacks (2015), as "an absurdist ode to paper"; Catherine Wagley of LA Weekly described his near-life-size wood sculpture of an overflowing garage, Roll Up (2014), as "arresting," "familiar and believable ... with flourishes that are just slightly off." In 2010, 2009, 2004 and 2002, he had solo exhibitions at Ace Gallery, Beverly Hills, CA. Prior to those exhibitions, Colson had three shows at Griffin Contemporary in Venice, California and four shows at Angles Gallery in Santa Monica, CA, among others.

== Group exhibitions ==
Colson's work has been represented in numerous group exhibitions including those at the Pasadena Museum of California Art in 2017, Los Angeles Municipal Gallery (2013), Frederick R. Weisman Collection, Pepperdine University, Malibu, California (2011), Sammlung Rosenkranz, University Witten/Herdecke, Witten, Germany (2002), Leo Castelli Gallery, New York, New York (2000), Museum of Contemporary Art, Los Angeles (1999), The Drawing Center, New York and Hammer Museum, Los Angeles, California (1999), Museum of Modern Art, Rijeka, Yugoslavia (1990), Otis Art Institute/Parson School of Design, Los Angeles, California (1990), Wonzimer Gallery, Los Angeles, California (2020).

== Selected collections ==
Colson's art belongs to the collections of the Los Angeles County Museum of Art, Museum of Contemporary Art, Los Angeles, the Collection of Count Giuseppe Panza di Buomo, the Rosenkranz Foundation (Berlin), and the Laguna Art Museum.

== Awards ==
Colson was awarded a John Simon Guggenheim Foundation Fellowship in 2012 and a City of Los Angeles (C.O.L.A.) Fellowship in 2015.
