= Travis Collinson =

American artist

Travis Collinson (born Sacramento, California) is a visual artist whose paintings take elements from photographs and sketches and reinterpret them at larger scale.

Collinson lives and works in San Francisco, CA. According to critics, his works involve mostly portraiture in an abstract manner and investigate and illustrate complex observations.

In 1998, Collinson attended the Otis School of Art and Design. He received his associate degree in 2001 at Victor Valley Community College (A.A.) and his BFA in 2003 at California State University Fullerton.

== Solo exhibitions ==
- 2016 More Than Your Selfie, New Museum Los Gatos, Los Gatos, CA
- 2015 Contemplating Character, Museum of Fine Arts, St. Petersburg, FL
- 2015 Lightning Strikes, Dolby Chadwick Gallery, San Francisco, CA
- 2015 Knobby Knees: Maloney Fine Art, Los Angeles
- 2015 Narcolepsy in Pink: Dominican University Gallery, San Marco
- 2013 Drawings and Paintings, Maloney Fine Art, Los Angeles, CA
- 2011 Drawings and Paintings, Eli Ridgway Gallery, San Francisco, CA
- 2010 Bookstore Project Space. Baer Ridgway Exhibitions, San Francisco, CA
- 2006 New Works: Backroom at Memphis, Santa Ana, CA

== Group exhibitions ==
- 2016 More Than Your Selfie, New Museum Los Gatos, Los Gatos, CA
- 2014 Look at me: Portraiture from Manet to Present, Leila Heller Gallery, New York, NY
- 2014 Hello Goodbye, Dolby Chadwick Gallery, San Francisco, CA
- 2014 5 Year Anniversary Show, Ever Gold Gallery, San Francisco, CA
- 2014 Good Dog: Art of Man's Best Friend, Turtle Bay Museum, Redding, CA
- 2013 That's What I Figure, Kondos Gallery, Sacramento City College (curated by Renny Pritikin)
- 2013 Summer Group Show: Eli Ridgway Gallery. San Francisco, CA
- 2013 The Illuminated Library: San Francisco State University Gallery, San Francisco, CA (curated by Sharon Bliss)
- 2012 Give Me Head: James Harris Gallery, Seattle, WA
- 2010 New American Painting: West Coast Edition, Exhibition in Print (Juror: Larry Rinder)
- 2010 Hauntology: Berkeley Art Museum / Pacific Film Archive, Berkeley, CA
- 2010 Paper! Awesome!: Baer Ridgway Exhibitions, San Francisco, CA
- 2009 Fresh MOCA Auction: Museum of Contemporary Art, Los Angeles, CA
- 2009 Auction = Stimulus: Laguna Art Museum, Laguna Beach, CA
- 2008 2332: Huntington Beach Art Center: Huntington Beach, CA
- 2008 Indecipherable: COMA Alternative Space, Los Angeles, CA
- 2007 Mind Your P's and D's: I-5 Gallery, Los Angeles, CA
- 2007 Whisper Down the Lane: Swallow Gallery, Silverlake, CA
- 2007 Laguna Art Museum: Auction = Stimulus, Laguna Beach, CA
- 2006 Little Things: Swallow Gallery, Silverlake, CA
- 2006 National Orange Show: San Bernardino, CA
- 2006 Let Me Introduce Myself: The Office, Huntington Beach, CA
- 2004 OOTS guest artist exhibition: OOTS Art Collaborative, Fullerton, CA
- 2004 Second Biennial Orange County, Muckenthaler Cultural Center, Fullerton, CA
- 2003 The Paintings Max Ernst Didn't Make: Black Dragon Kung Fu Society, Los Angeles, CA

== Bibliography ==
- Wood, Eve. “Travis Collinson Drawings and Paintings.” Whitehot Magazine, February 2013
- Baker, Kenneth. “Travis Collinson's emotional distress sucks us in.” San Francisco Chronicle, August 13
- Bowers, Keith. “Abstracted Realism.” SF Weekly, July 13
- Modenessi, Jennifer. “Haunting works at the Berkeley Art Museum” Contra Costa Times, August 2010
- Walsh, Dianella. “2332,” Art Scene, November 2008.
- Chang, Richard. “2332,” Exhibition Catalogue, 2008, P. 10
- Coffey, Justin Edward. “The Arts: ‘Each of These Things is Unlike the Others,” OC Weekly, Number 39, April 21, 2006, P. 36
- Schoenkopf, Rebecca. “the Arts: ‘Mediums’ at Large,” OC Weekly, June 9, 2005

== Curated exhibitions ==
- 2008 Indecipherable: COMA Alternative Space, Los Angeles, CA
- 2006 Impression/Ism, City of Brea Art Gallery, Brea, CA
- 2005 Mediums, City of Brea Art Gallery, Brea, CA
- 2004 Wet Paint Contemporary Painting, City of Brea Art Gallery, Brea, CA

== Public collections ==
- Berkeley Art Museum and Pacific Film Archive
- San Francisco Museum of Modern Art
