= Brandon Landers =

American painter

Brandon D. Landers
- Born: 1985 (age 40–41); South Los Angeles, California, U.S.
- Known for: Painting
- Notable work: The Joys (2019)

Brandon D. Landers (born in 1985) is an American contemporary figurative painter and art educator. His compositions often depict portraits of family and friends as well as imagined and daily scenes of Black life with written text embedded in them.

== Early life and education ==
Brandon Landers was born in 1985 and grew up as an only child in South Central Los Angeles, California. He concentrated in the visual arts at a young age after falling from a tree in 11th grade. As mentioned by The New York Times, Landers couldn't play basketball while recovering from the accident and started drawing as a hobby. Landers also attended a Boys Scouts after school program in Los Angeles.

Landers received a BA from California State University, Bakersfield. In addition of his artistic practice, Landers worked as an art teacher to young children at the local Franklin Elementary School in Bakersfield.

== Work ==
Brandon Landers's portraits of family and friends are an expansive on the Black experience and art history. In the words of the artist: "I hold value to my art. It’s not just something to put on a wall. I’m not just trying to paint because I think it’s cute. I want people to feel joy, beauty, sadness. I want to use it to show our experience as Black people." Landers work has been compared to art historical references such as Romare Bearden, Robert Colescott, Clementine Hunter and Kerry James Marshall.

The solo show Aretha at M+B gallery in Los Angeles was his first institutional exhibition in 2019. He presented a set of large scale canvases and portraits such as the paintings The Joys (2019) and Ways (2018–2019).

His paintings were presented in two different venues for Made in L.A. 2020: a version, both at the Hammer Museum at University of California, Los Angeles, and at the Huntington Library, Art Museum, and Botanical Gardens, California.

Brandon Landers's work is included in the collection of the Pérez Art Museum Miami, Florida.
