= Greg Colson =

American painter

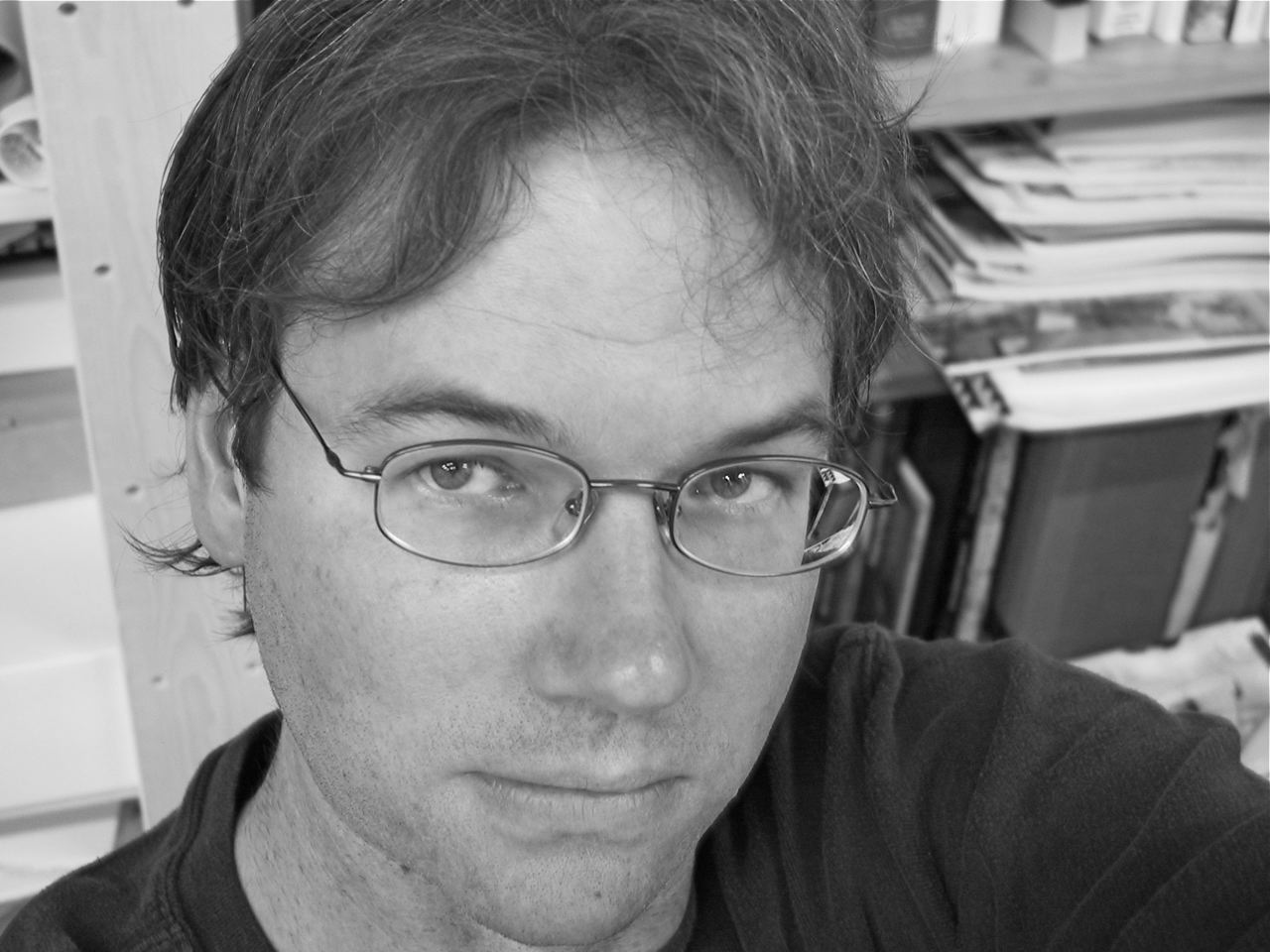
- Born: Greg Colson; April 23, 1956 (age 70); Seattle, Washington, U.S.
- Known for: Painting, sculpture, drawing, printmaking, photography
- Movement: Assemblage, conceptual art, arte povera

Greg Colson (born April 23, 1956) is an American artist known for his works and sculptures using scavenged materials.

== Biography ==
Colson was born in Seattle, Washington and grew up in Bakersfield, California, in the nearby suburb of Oildale with his parents and two brothers Doug and Jeff, who is also an artist. His father Lewis Colson was a social worker but was also a skilled mechanic and inventive with makeshift repairs and adapting materials to new uses – which inspired his son's appreciation of the ordinary and the rejected. The industrial environment of the Bakersfield/Oildale area, and its accompanying attitudes and outlook, also affected Colson – particularly in its contrast to the large urban/cultural centers he would later inhabit as an artist.

He received his BA from California State University Bakersfield where he studied with George Ketterl, Ted Kerzie, Michael Heively, and visiting artists John McCracken, Joe Goode, Ed Ruscha, James Turrell, and Ed Moses. From 1978 to 1980 he attended Claremont Graduate School, studying with Tom Wudl, Michael Brewster, and Roland Reiss and earned his MFA. During the 1980s he apprenticed for artists Vija Celmins, Ruscha, and Wudl. In 1987 he had his first solo exhibition with Angles Gallery. Colson currently works and lives in Venice, California with his wife, writer Dinah Kirgo.

== Works ==
Colson's diagrams and maps speak to the detached, abstract quality of much human analysis, at the same time smuggling social critique into each work. Roberta Smith of The New York Times described Colson's 1990 debut exhibition at Sperone Westwater Gallery: "In nearly all of Mr. Colson's works, the combination of modesty and grandiosity, of mental exactness and physical imprecision adds up to an odd, sad beauty. Elliptical as they are, his pieces often seem to scrutinize the conflict between the active center and deserted margins of industrialized society."

Colson's series of ‘Stick Maps’ of cities such as Cleveland, San Jose, and Baton Rouge are built of found lengths of assorted materials; ski poles, curtain rods, plastic pipe, wood molding – the structure becoming a metaphor for the manifold influences on a city. His constructed ‘Pie Chart’ paintings based on socio-cultural surveys, mock analysis. Colson's 'Elliptical Models' paintings incorporate, the ordinary and the profound and suggest preposterous hierarchies using the formal through-line of the circle. Sharon Mizota, in her Los Angeles Times review of Colson's 2010 exhibition at William Griffin Gallery (now Kayne Griffin Corcoran), characterized these works as "grand and hilarious testaments to the leveling effect of data overload. "One [piece] includes concentric circles depicting ‘5 Steps to Happiness,’ ‘Flea Life Cycle,’ ‘The Cycle of Addiction,’ and for good measure, a flange gasket. The piece levels the distinctions between these wide-ranging phenomena in an absurdly uninformative information graphic." More recently, Colson has designed and created large-scale outdoor sculptures.

== Exhibitions ==
Colson has had solo exhibitions throughout the United States and Europe, including

- Sperone Westwater (New York)
- Patrick Painter Inc. (Los Angeles)
- Galerie Konrad Fischer (Düsseldorf)
- Gian Enzo Sperone (Rome)
- Galleria Cardi (Milan)
- Kunsthalle Lophem (Bruges, Belgium)
- Baldwin Gallery (Aspen)
- Krannert Art Museum (University of Illinois Urbana-Champaign)
- Lannan Museum (Lake Worth, Florida)

Colson's work is in many public collections, including

- Whitney Museum of American Art (New York)
- Metropolitan Museum of Art (New York)
- Museum of Contemporary Art (Los Angeles)
- Hirshhorn Museum and Sculpture Garden (Washington, D.C.)
- Panza Collection (Varese, Italy)
- Sammlung Rosenkranz (Berlin)
- Moderna Museet (Stockholm)

== Selected collections ==
Greg Colson's work is included in collections at the

- Getty Research Institute, Los Angeles
- CA; Hammer Museum, Los Angeles
- CA; Henry Art Gallery, Seattle, WA
- Hirshhorn Museum and Sculpture Garden, Washington, D.C.
- Krannert Art Museum, Urbana-Champaignm Illinois
- Los Angeles County Museum of Art, CA
- Metropolitan Museum of Art, New York, NY
- Moderna Museet, Stockholm, Sweden
- Museum of Contemporary Art, Los Angeles, CA
- Museum of Contemporary Art, San Diego, CA
- Museum of Modern Art, New York, NY
- New York Public Library, New York, NY
- Panza Collection, Lugano, Switzerland
- Sammlung Rosenkranz, Berlin, Germany
- Tsaritsino Museum of Contemporary Art, Moscow, Russia
- UBS Art Collection, Zurich, Switzerland
- Vancouver Art Gallery, British Columbia, Canada
- Whitney Museum of American Art, New York, NY.

== Selected bibliography ==
=== Monographs ===
- Greg Colson, Galleria Cardi, Milan. Essay by Robert Evren, 2001
- Greg Colson, Whale and Star Press. Texts by Pontus Hulten and Peter Wegner, 1999
- Greg Colson, Lannan Museum, Lake Worth, FL. Essay by Bonnie Clearwater, 1988
- Greg Colson: The Architecture of Distraction, Griffin Editions, Los Angeles. Interview with Genevieve Devitt, 2006
- Greg Colson: Krannert Art Museum, University of Illinois. Essay by David Pagel, 1996

=== Selected books and catalogues ===
- American Bricolage, Sperone Westwater, New York. Todd Alden, David Leiber and Tom Sachs, 2000
- Mapping, Museum of Modern Art, New York. Essay by Robert Storr, 1994
- Panza: The Legacy of a Collector, Museum of Contemporary Art, Los Angeles. Texts by Kenneth Baker, Cornelia H. Butler, Rebecca Morse and Giuseppe Panza, 1999
- Giuseppe Panza: Memories of a Collector, Abbeville Press, New York. By Giuseppe Panza, 2007
- Gian Enzo Sperone: Torino, Roma, New York, Hopefulmonster Editore, Turin. Texts by Anna Minola, Maria Cristina Mundici, Francesco Poli, Maria Teresa Roberto, 2000
- Sammlung Rosenkranz im Von der Heydt-Museum, Wuppertal, Germany. Texts by Sabine Fehlemann, Peter Frank, Pontus Hulten, 2002

=== Selected articles ===
- Maartje Den Breejen. "Intentie en Ongeluk-Als het Leven Zelf." Het PAROOL (Amsterdam), September 6, 2002, p. 11
- David Hunt. "Spotlight: Greg Colson." Flash Art, November–December 1998, p. 105
- Ken Johnson. “Greg Colson-review.” The New York Times, February 16, 2001, p. B37
- Melrod, George (September 1994). "Greg Colson at Sperone Westwater". Art in America. 82 (9): 112. Archived from the original on November 29, 2004 – via FindArticles.
- Sharon Mizota. "Art review: Greg Colson at Griffin." Los Angeles Times, January 30, 2010
- Sally O'Reilly. "Greg Colson at Sprovieri." Time Out (London), January 16, 2002, p. 48
- Tibby Rothman. “Beyond the Image – Interview with Greg Colson” Venice Paper, October 2006
- John Russell. “Greg Colson-review.” The New York Times, January 12, 1990, p. C27
- Jerry Saltz. "Greg Colson: Liberating Materials From Materiality." Flash Art, May–June 1990, p. 150
- Roberta Smith. “These Are the Faces to Watch.” The New York Times, January 5, 1990, p. C21
