= Jeffery Elwell =

Jeffery S. Elwell

10th President of Eastern New Mexico University
- In office July 1, 2017 – 2020
- Preceded by: Steven Gamble

Personal details
- Spouse: Edwina Gower
- Children: Preston
- Education: Southern Illinois University Carbondale; University of Southwestern Louisiana; California State University, Bakersfield
- Occupation: Academic
- Website: President Jeffery S. Elwell

Jeffery Elwell is a former President of Eastern New Mexico University (ENMU).

== Early life and college ==
Elwell spent much of his childhood in Southern California, graduating from James Monroe High School in 1975. He graduated from California State University, Bakersfield in 1979, with a B.A. in English. He attended graduate school at Louisiana State University from 1979-80 before attending and graduating from the University of Southwestern Louisiana in 1982 with an M.S. in Communication and Theatre. He earned a Ph.D. in Speech Communication and Theater from Southern Illinois University Carbondale in 1986.

== Academic career ==
After spending time as a faculty member at three small private liberal arts institutions (Virginia Intermont College, Gardner-Webb University, and Aurora University) between 1984 and 1989, he was appointed as associate professor and director of Theatre at Mississippi State University (MSU) in 1989. He served at MSU until 1996, earning both tenure and promotion to full professor. In 1996, he moved to Marshall University as professor and chair of the Department of Theatre and Dance. In 1999, he was appointed as chair of the Department of Theatre Arts and Executive Artistic Director of the Nebraska Repertory Theatre at the University of Nebraska–Lincoln. He served in that role until November 2004 when he became the Founding Dean of the College of Fine Arts and Communication at East Carolina University. He served in that role until 2010 when he was appointed Provost at Auburn University Montgomery. In 2012, Elwell was appointed Dean of the College of Arts and Sciences at the University of Tennessee Chattanooga and served in that role until July 2017, when he was appointed President at ENMU.
