= Anthony James (artist) =

British-American artist (born 1974)

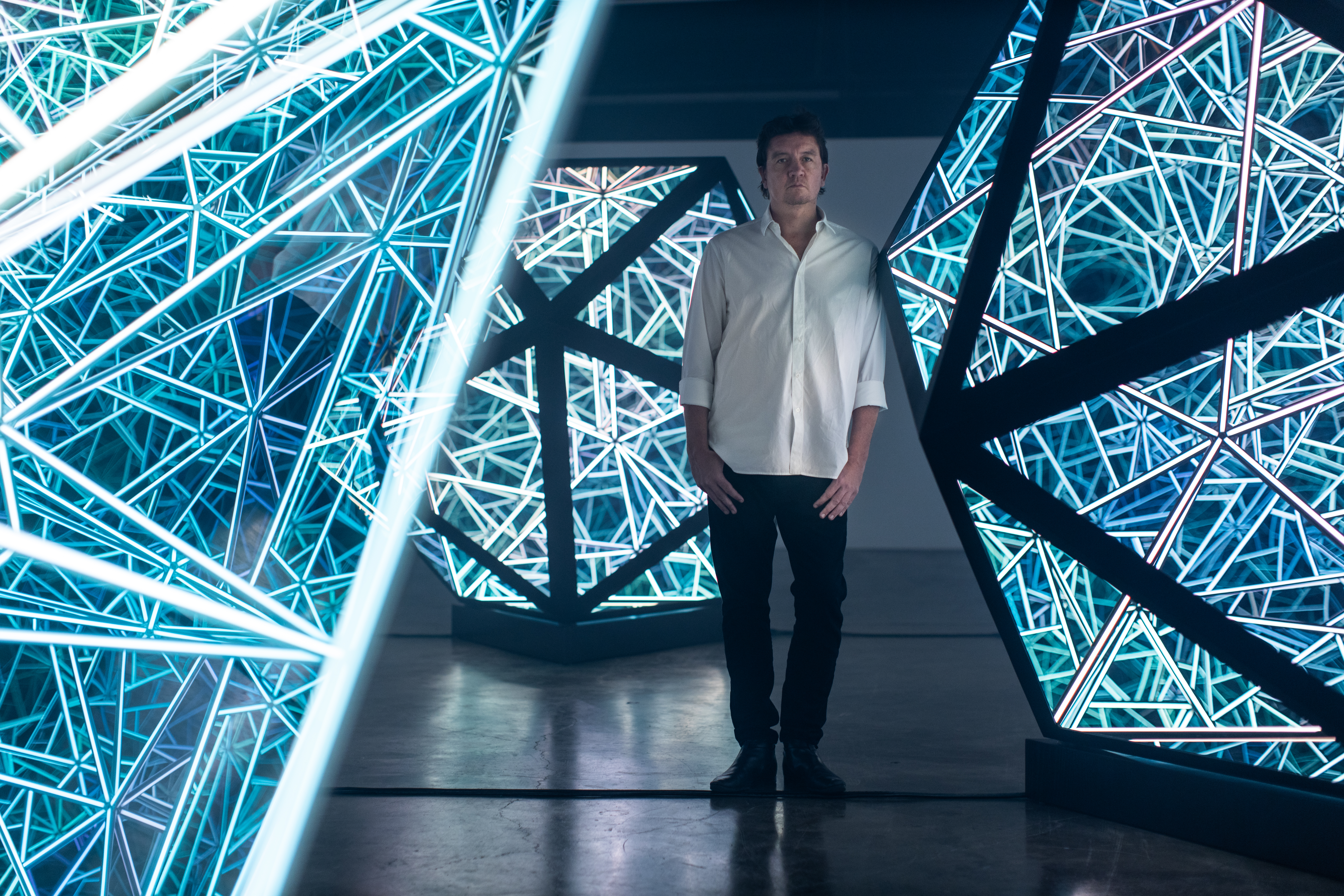
- Anthony James in his Los Angeles studio, 2020
- Born: December 1974 (age 51); England
- Occupation: Artist
- Known for: Sculpture, painting, and experiential Installation art

Anthony James is a British/American artist, based in Los Angeles, known for his monumental and experiential sculptures and installations. His work gestures towards the theatricality of minimalism and formalism. Throughout his work, there is a focus on materiality, alchemy, and a deep respect for light and space.

== Early life ==
Anthony James was born in England in December 1974. He studied in London at Central Saint Martins College of Art and Design from 1994 to 1998, and graduated with a degree in fine art painting.

== Art ==
=== Portals, 2008–present ===
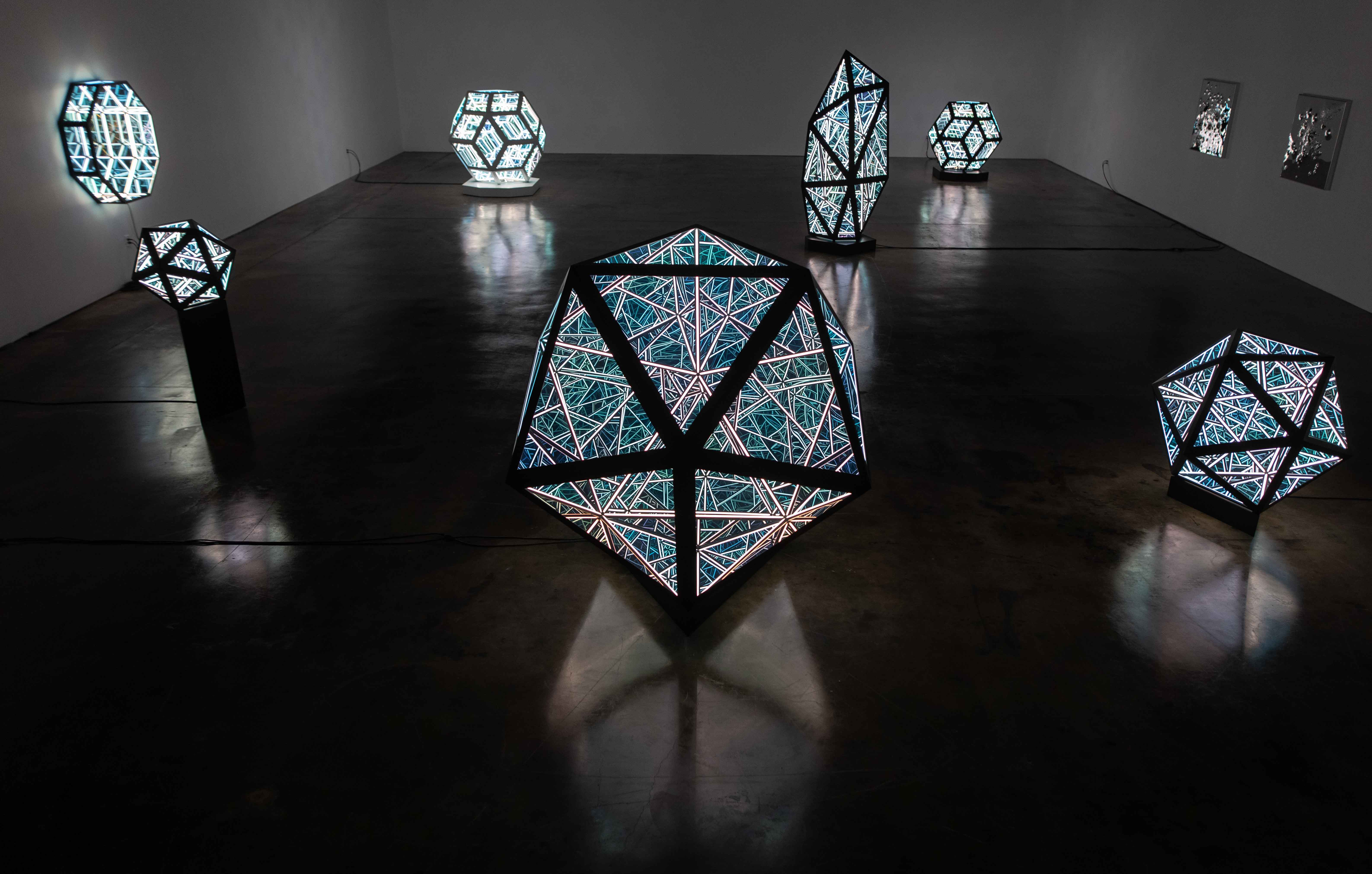
Portals

Each piece in the Portals series is composed of titanium, glass, and LED lights. James was inspired by Greek philosopher Plato's work, "Timaeus", specifically his description of the elements of Earth, Fire, Water and Air and their geometric correspondents. It debuted in 2008, and the collection continues to grow.

=== Repose, 2020 ===
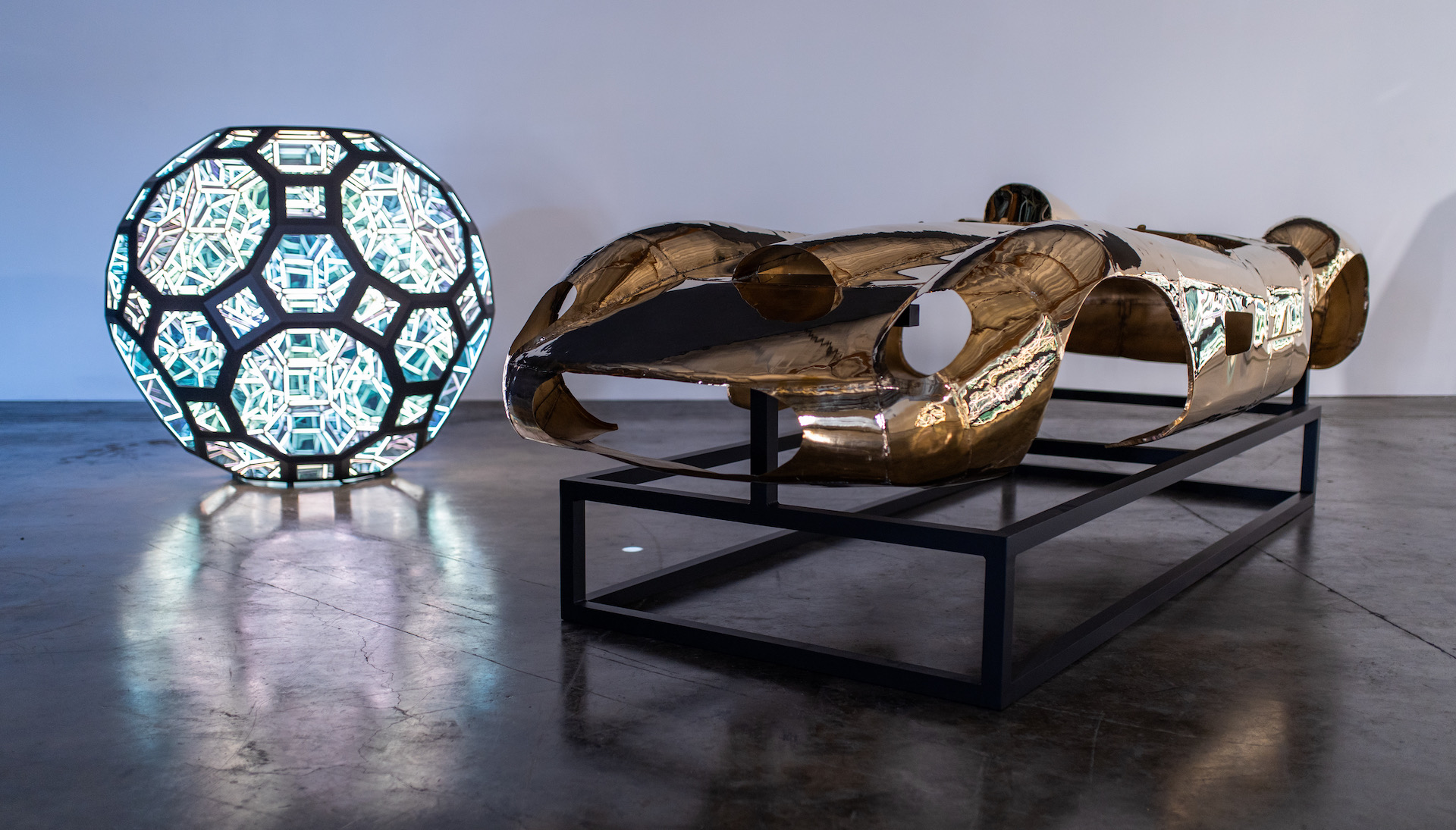
REPOSE, 2020

The Repose series consists of three Ferrari bodies: the 1957 250TR, 1962 250 GTO, and the 1967 P4. The sculptures are presented in archival quality bronze, aluminum, and copper.

=== KΘ (Kalos Thanatos), 2008 ===
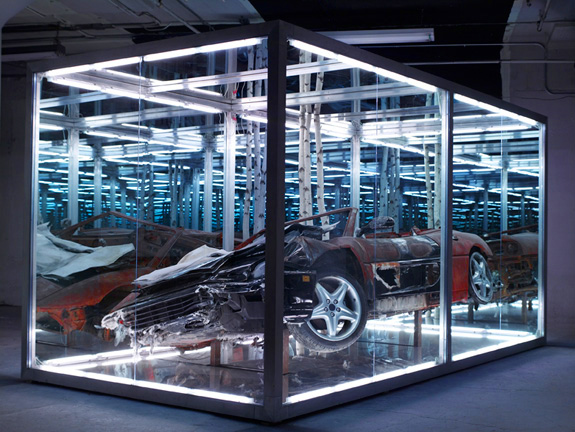
KΘ Kalos Thanatos, 2008

Kalos Thanatos (KΘ), Greek for “beautiful death”, originated when James burned his Ferrari F335 Spyder in a birch forest, which was later placed in a glass box with birch tree trunks. James drew inspiration from the ancient Greeks, who historically made sacrifices to Aphrodite in birch forests.

=== The Birch Series, 2005–present ===
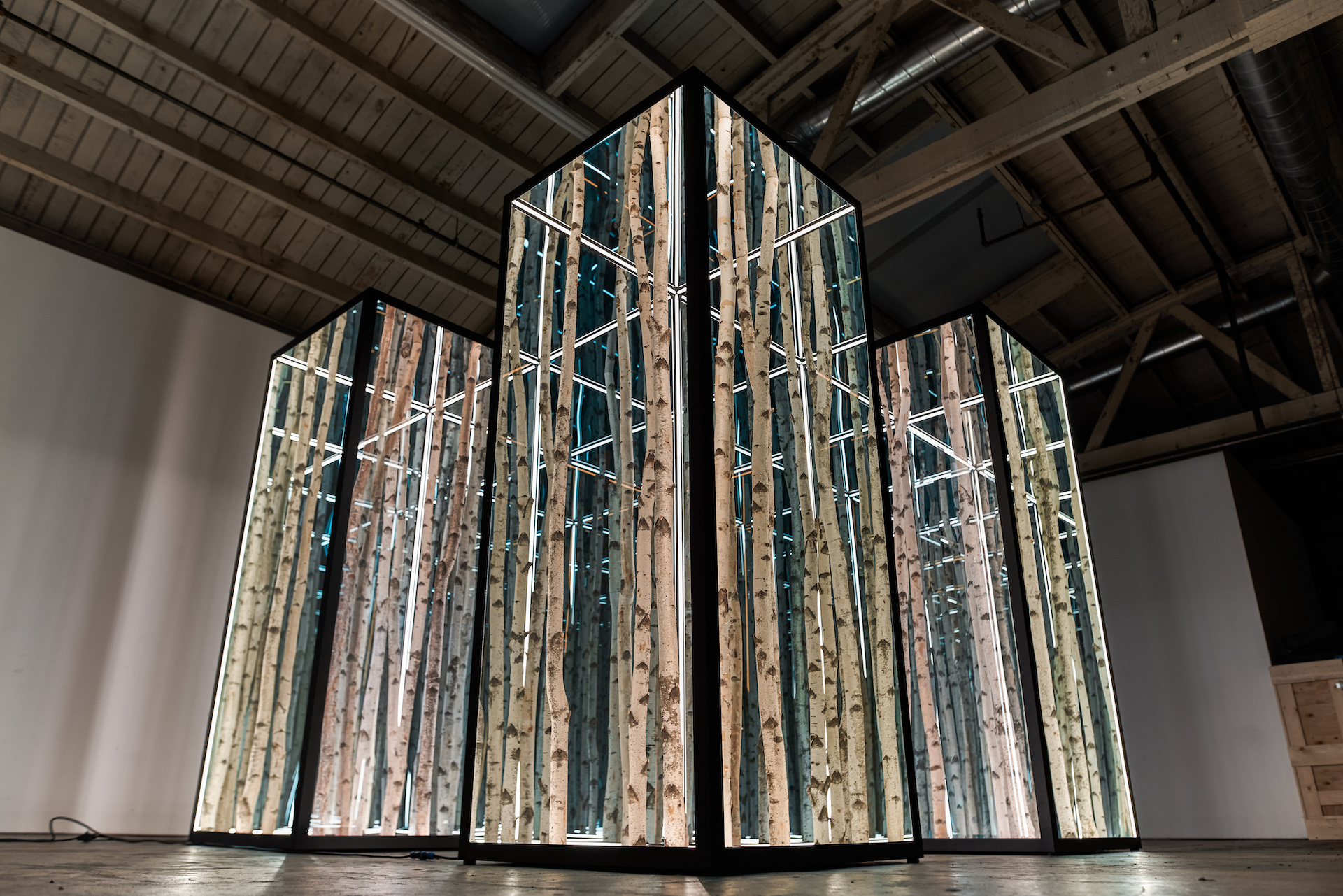
Birch, 2019

The Birch Series originally debuted in New York City in 2005. It consists of several variously sized, vertical light boxes with young birch tree trunks inside. The sculpture series references the containment and simulation of nature. The works have mirrored sides, which give the illusion of an endless birch forest. The pieces are composed of birch trees, metal, glass, and fluorescent lights or LEDs. The birch tree is associated with magical symbolism.

=== Bullet Series, 2011–present ===
The Bullet series is James' attempt to create a "visual demonstration of the universe", inspired by Italian artist Lucio Fontana. The pieces of the series are composed of polished steel which has been shot with a variety of firearms, puncturing the material in random areas with varying intensity. James described this process as "a zen practice".

=== Morphic Fields, 2014 ===
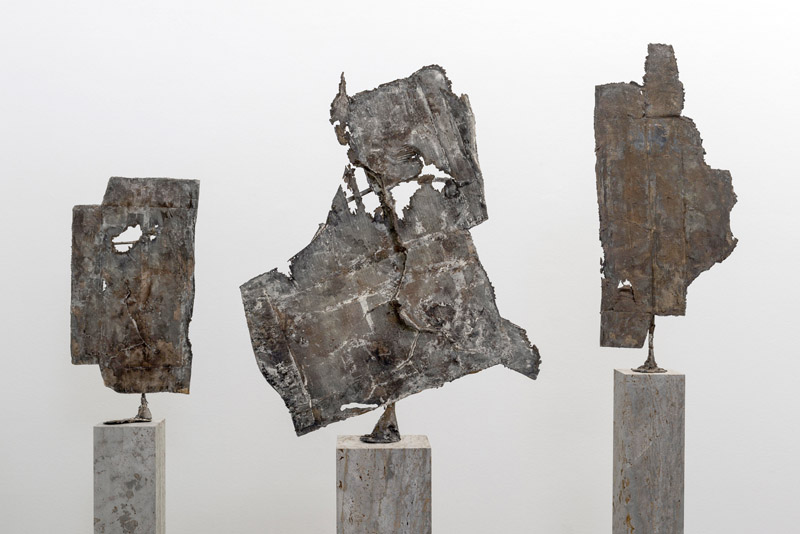
Morphic Fields, 2014 Anthony James

Morphic Fields was an exhibition of bronze and limestone pieces inspired by the scientist Rupert Sheldrake's pseudoscientific theory of morphic resonance: "a process whereby self-organizing systems inherit a memory from previous similar systems." The sculptures are created from found materials.

=== Shields, 2015–present ===
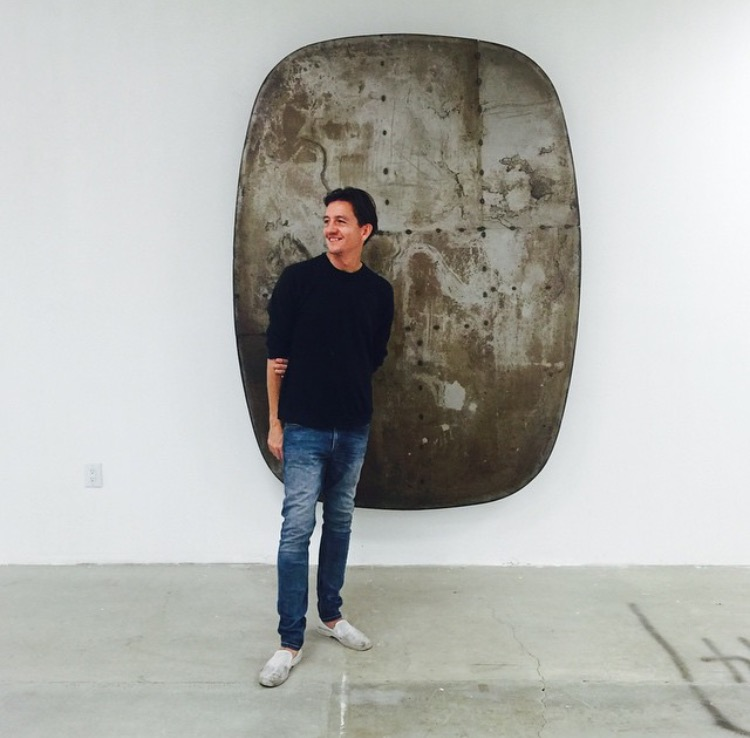
Shield, 2015 Anthony James

Shields is an exhibition of curved disks made of brass, bronze, and steel "scarred with minimalist markings."

=== Rain Paintings, 2018 ===
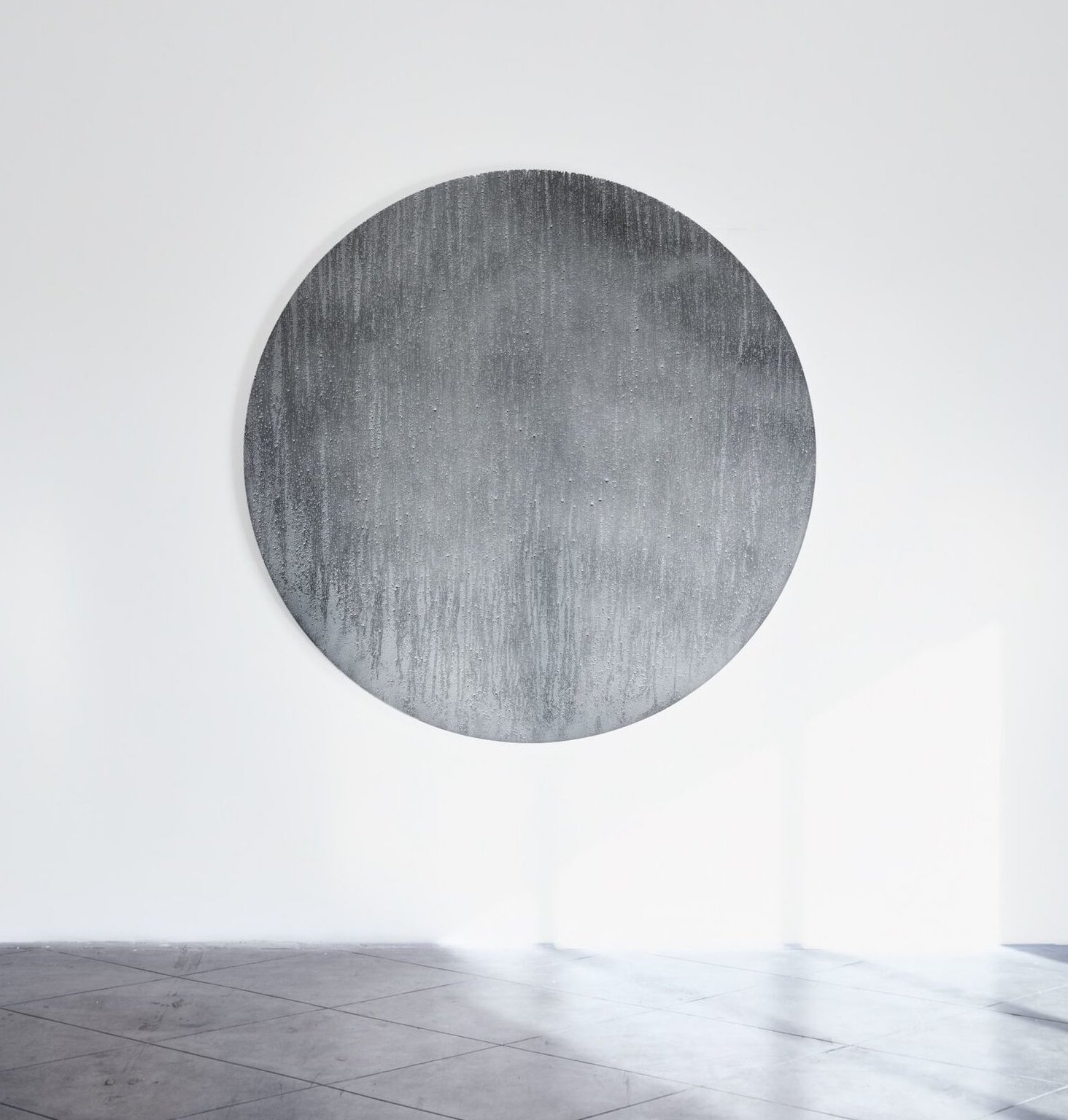
Rain Paintings, 2018 Anthony James

Rain Paintings was a photorealistic series comprising Belgian linen, gesso, and a proprietary acrylic urethane clearcoat.

=== Neons, 2002 ===
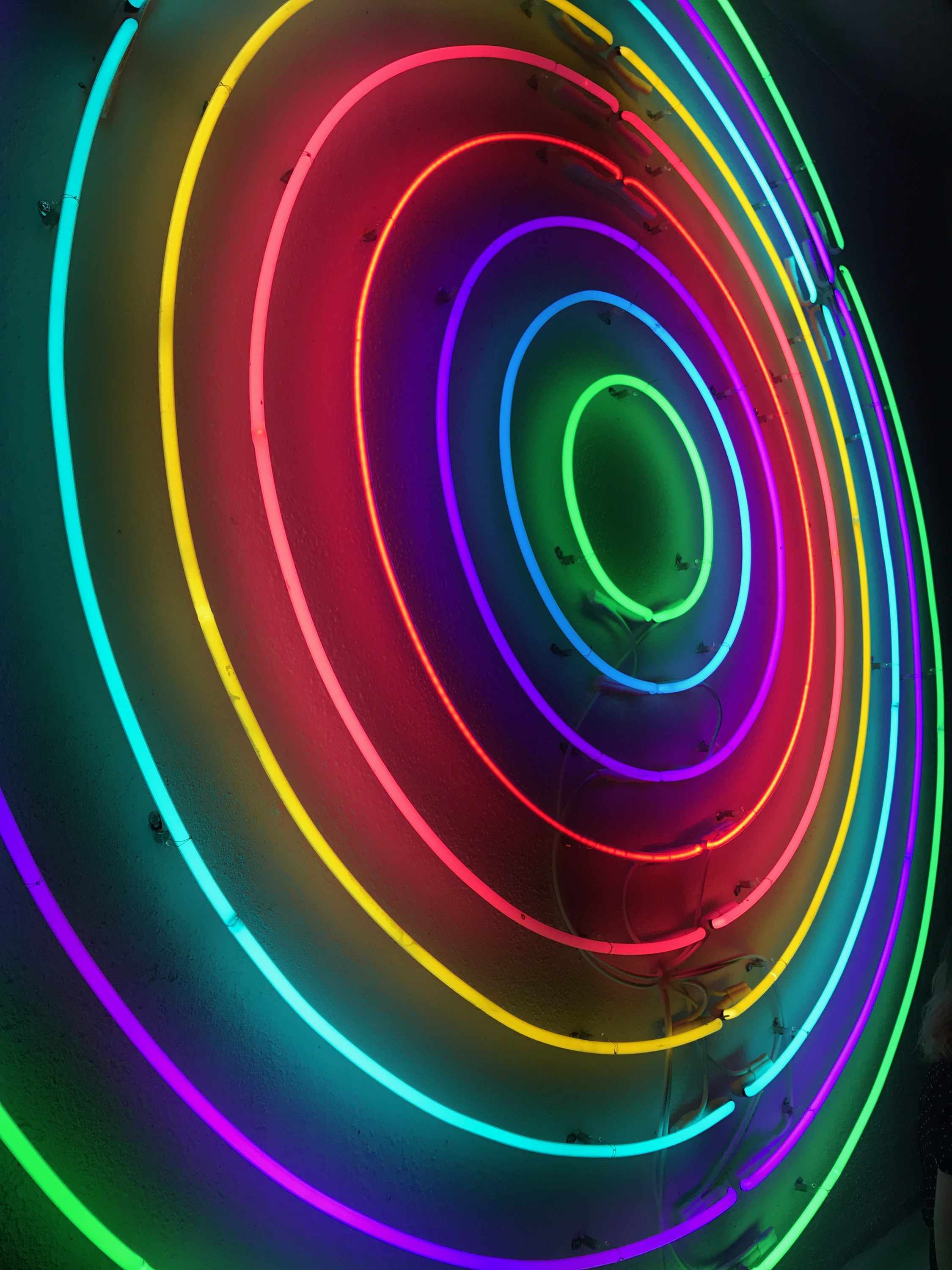
Neon, 2002–present

Neons was a series of colorful rings of neon lights placed in ascending order of diameter size.

== Accomplishments ==
James was selected to participate in the inaugural Mayfair Sculpture Trail, which took place from 1 October through 31 October 2020. The Sculpture Trail had 13 temporary sculptures and 5 permanent fixtures, one of which was James' "Crystal 001". The Sculpture Trail was a part of the 2020 Mayfair Art Week in Mayfair, London, and continues to be held annually.

== Exhibitions ==
Selected solo exhibitions

- 2020: Opera Gallery, London, England
- 2018: Rain Paintings, There-There Gallery, Los Angeles, CA
- 2018: Portals, Melissa Morgan Fine Art, Palm Desert CA
- 2017: Portals, There-There Gallery, Los Angeles, CA
- 2017: Shields, Fort Gansevoor, New York, NY
- 2016: Maloney Fine Art, Los Angeles, CA
- 2014: Morphic Fields, Walter Storms Galeri, Munich, Germany
- 2012: Consciousness And Portraits Of Sacrifice, Brand New Gallery, Milan, Italy
- 2010: ΚΘ, Patrick Painter Gallery, Santa Monica, CA
- 2007: Visionaire Gallery, New York, NY
- 2007: Milk Gallery presented by Gavlak Gallery, New York, NY
- 2007: Gavlak Gallery, West Palm Beach, FL
- 2006: Kantor/Feuer Window, New York City
- 2005: Holasek Wier Gallery, New York City
- 1999: Four, Four, Four Apex Art, New York City

== Publications ==
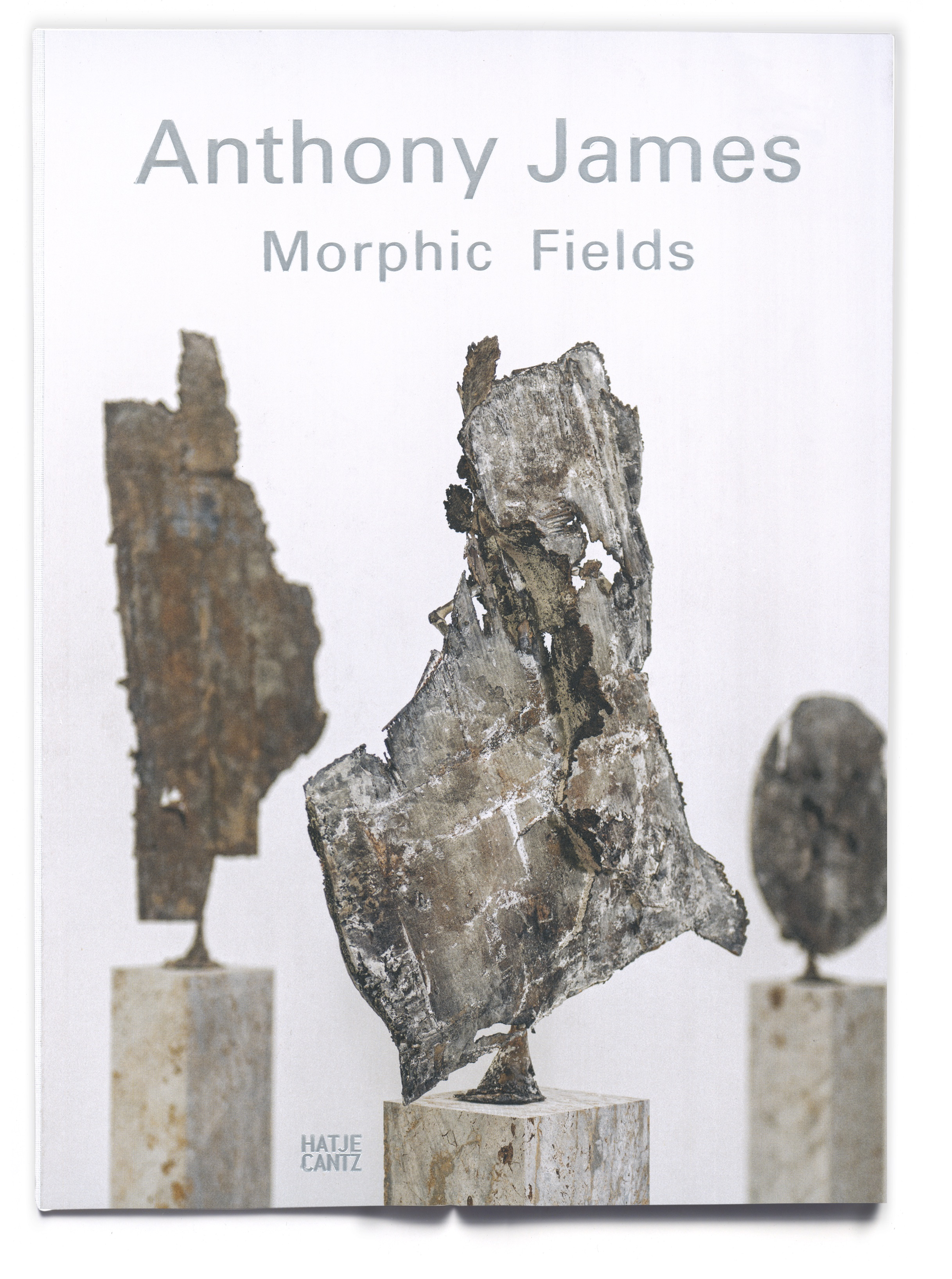
Morphic Fields by: Anthony James

Morphic Fields is the title of a series of 21 amorphous bronze sculptures with limestone bases, which are works created from cardboard boxes dipped in and shaped with wax and subsequently cast in bronze. This first monograph on Anthony James includes writing from fashion and art critic Glenn O'Brien, writer Christian Kracht, and Matthias Mühling, as well as an interview with biologist Rupert Sheldrake, whose pseudoscientific theory of morphic fields inspired the artist's work and the title of this publication. The book was published by Hatje Cantz Verlag.
