= John W. Ayers =

American academic

- Education: Johns Hopkins University
- Known for: Public health informatics
- Scientific career
- Fields: Epidemiology
- Workplaces: University of California, San Diego

John W. Ayers is an adjunct associate professor and epidemiologist at University of California, San Diego, affiliated both with the university's School of Medicine and its Qualcomm Institute. He researches in the field of public health informatics and the use of social media data in detecting behavioral health trends. His public health research expertise is in studying the circulation of information online. Trained in both political science and data science, he has published in medical journals including Journal of the American Medical Association, JAMA Internal Medicine, American Journal of Public Health, and American Journal of Preventive Medicine. His research findings have been featured in national and international media sources, including The New York Times, The Washington Post, Los Angeles Times, Time, and Newsweek.

== Education ==
- California State University, Bakersfield, B.A., 06/06, Political Science
- San Diego State University, M.A., 06/08, Political Science
- Johns Hopkins Bloomberg School of Public Health, Ph.D., 06/11, Behavioral Sciences
- Harvard-MIT Health Sciences & Technology, Fellow, 12/12 Informatics

== Selected publications ==
- Ayers, J. W. (2011). Tracking the rise in popularity of electronic nicotine delivery systems (electronic cigarettes) using search query surveillance. American Journal of Public Health.
- Ayers, J. W. (2013). Seasonality in seeking mental health information on Google. American Journal of Preventive Medicine.
- Ayers, J. W. (2014). Could behavioral medicine lead the web data revolution? Journal of the American Medical Association.
- Ayers, J. W. et al. (2023). “Comparing Physician and Artificial Intelligence Chatbot Responses to Patient Questions Posted to a Public Social Media Forum.” JAMA Internal Medicine (doi:10.1001/jamainternmed.2023.1838).
- Ayers, J. W. et al. (2023). “Evaluating Artificial Intelligence Responses to Public Health Questions.” JAMA Network Open
