= Lynnette Zelezny =

American academic leader and psychologist

Lynnette Zelezny is an American academic leader and psychologist who served as the fifth president of California State University, Bakersfield (CSUB), from 2018 to 2023. She was the first woman to hold the position. As president, she emphasized student access and retention, diversity initiatives, and regional economic engagement. Her leadership was covered by regional news outlets during both her appointment and retirement.

== Early life and education ==
Lynnette Zelezny earned a bachelor's and master's degrees in psychology from Humboldt State University (now California State Polytechnic University, Humboldt). She later earned a Ph.D. in psychology from Claremont Graduate University and an M.B.A. from California State University, Fresno.

== Academic career ==
Zelezny began her academic career as a faculty member in psychology, specializing in environmental and social psychology. Her research focused on attitudes, behavior, and sustainability, particularly the psychological dimensions of environmental concern and social change.

She later transitioned into academic administration, holding leadership positions at California State University, Fresno, where she served in roles including dean of graduate studies and vice provost. In 2014, she was appointed provost and vice president for academic affairs at California State University, Fresno (Fresno State), serving as the university's chief academic officer.

In 2018, Zelezny was appointed the fifth president of California State University, Bakersfield, to succeed Horace Mitchell. During her tenure, she emphasized student access and retention, diversity and inclusion initiatives, and strengthening partnerships between the university and the surrounding community. She announced her retirement at the end of 2023 after six years as president. Zelezny was succeeded by Vice President for Academic Affairs Vernon B. Harper Jr., first in an interim capacity, and later as the sixth CSUB president.
