= Sarkis Zabunyan =

French conceptual artist of Turkish-Armenian descent

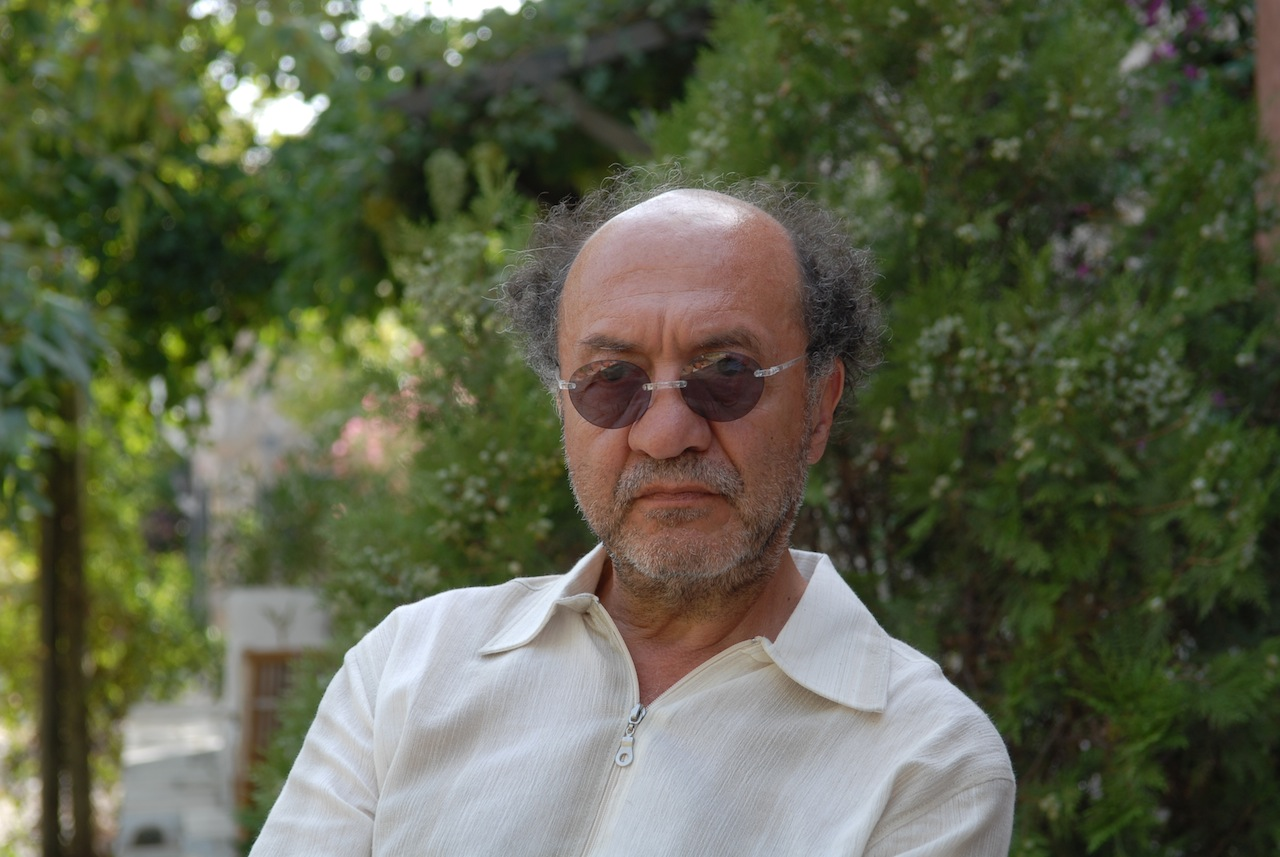
- Sarkis (2006)
- Born: 26 September 1938 (age 88); Istanbul, Turkey
- Occupation: Conceptual artist

Sarkis Zabunyan (Armenian: Սարգիս Զաբունյան), known as Sarkis, (Armenian: Սարգիս; born 26 September 1938) is an Armenian conceptual artist.

== Biography ==
Born in Istanbul in 1938, Sarkis studied French, painting and interior design before moving to Paris in 1964. In 1967, he won the painting prize at the Biennale de Paris and presented his work Connaissez-vous Joseph Beuys ? at the Salon de Mai, in a reference to the man he considered the most important artist of the day. In 1969, he was invited by the critic and curator Harald Szeemann to take part in the now legendary show When Attitudes Become Form. Teaching and the sharing of experience are key concerns of this artist. From 1980 to 1990 he was director of the Art Department at the École des Arts Décoratifs in Strasbourg, and from 1988 to 1995 he ran a seminar at the Institut des Hautes Études en Arts Plastiques created by Pontus Hulten. Since the 1980s, Sarkis has taken part in numerous international exhibitions (including Documenta and the biennials in Venice, Sydney, Istanbul and Moscow) and had his work shown in the world’s leading museums.

In the exhibition Passages at the Pompidou Centre in 2010, works by Sarkis were allowed to dialogue with works by Kasimir Malevich, the wall from André Breton’s studio, and Plight by Joseph Beuys, who is one of Sarkis’s sources of inspiration, along with the Russian filmmaker Andrei Tarkovsky, one of whose films he explored in the Brancusi studio. Passages evoked both the permanent back-and-forth between an artist’s studio and the museum, and Walter Benjamin’s great unfinished work about the arcades of Paris. The exhibition featured a series of recent or specially created works produced by the Pompidou Centre. These works, standing as the artist’s KRIEGSSCHATZ (trophies), comprised found objects, art works and ethnographic objects from different civilizations.

In 2011, the Musée d’Art Moderne et Contemporain in Geneva (MAMCO) devoted an important retrospective to the artist entitled Hôtel Sarkis. The presentation on four floors brought together 200 works created between 1971 and 2011, and explored the artist’s different practices (video and sound installations, watercolours, photographs, films) and thus amplified the resonance of a body of work produced in response to other artists, whether musicians, architects, writers, philosophers, painters, sculptors or filmmakers.

In 2012, Sarkis presented Ballads in the 5000 square metres of the underwater Hangars, at the invitation of the Museum Boijmans van Beuningen and the Port of Rotterdam, as well as Ailleurs, Ici on the estate of Chaumont-sur-Loire, following a commission by the regional council of Centre. He has also taken part in the group show La Triennale – Intense Proximité at the Palais de Tokyo with his Frise des Trésors de Guerre, showed at Néon, who’s afraid of red, yellow and blue? at La Maison Rouge – Fondation Antoine de Galbert, and Istanbul Modern at the Museum Boijmans Van Beuningen.

In 2013, Sarkis took part in the exhibition When Attitudes Become Form, Bern 1969/Venice 2013 at the Prada Foundation as part of the 55th Venice Biennale. He also showed at Passages Croisés en or at the Château d’Angers, and was invited to present his Frise de Guerre at the Museum of Old and New Art (MONA) in Tasmania as part of the exhibition The Red Queen. Sarkis also participated in the exhibition Ici, Ailleurs as part of the Marseille – Provence, European Capital of Culture programme, and the exhibition Modernity? Perspectives from France and Turkey at the Istanbul Modern, and in his solo exhibition titled Sarkis – Cage/Ryoanji Interpretation at the ARTER – Space for Art in Istanbul. In 2014 he exhibited his Ring Portraits at the Huis Marseille Museum voor Fotografie in Amsterdam, and was presented in three places: the CIAC, the MNAC and the Museum of the Romanian Peasant in Bucharest. A solo exhibition devoted to his work appeared at the Musée du Château des Ducs de Wurtemberg in Montbéliard.
