= Peter Shelton =

Peter or Pete Shelton is the name of:

- Peter L. Shelton (1946–2012), American architect
- Peter Shelton (sculptor) (born 1951), American sculptor
- Pete Shelton (musician) in The Outsiders (American band)
- Pete Shelton, fictional character in It Conquered the World
- Peter Shelton, editor of A One Man Show
- Peter Shelton, violinist on S&M (album)
- Peter Shelton, marine biologist and namesake of Uromunna sheltoni

== See also ==
- Peter Shilton (born 1949), English former footballer
- Peter Skelton, cricketer
