= Pontus Hultén =

Swedish art collector and museum director (1924–2006)

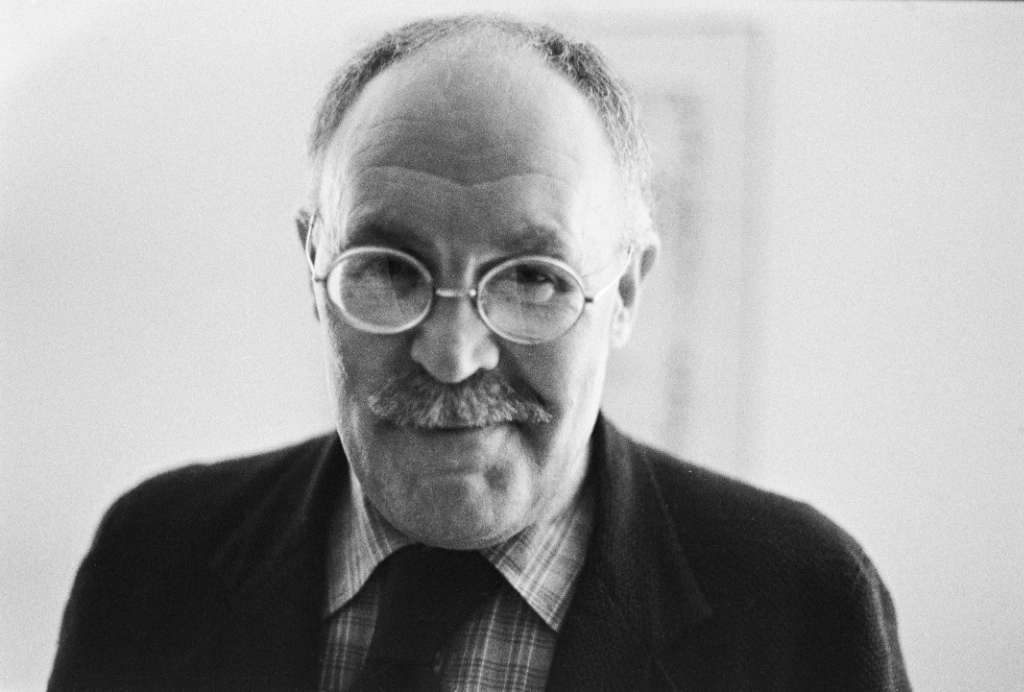
Pontus Hultén.

Karl Gunnar Vougt Pontus Hultén (21 June 1924 – 26 October 2006) was a Swedish art collector and museum director. Pontus Hultén is regarded as one of the most distinguished museum professionals of the twentieth century. He was the pioneering former head of the Museum of Modern Art in Stockholm and in the 1970s he was invited to participate in the creation of the Centre Georges Pompidou in Paris, where he was the first director of the Musée National d'Art Moderne (MNAM) in 1974–1981.

== Biography ==
Pontus Hultén was born in Stockholm; he studied art history at Stockholm University and during the 1950s he was a curator at a small art gallery and also organized film screenings. In 1958, he curated the exhibition Constructivist Design at Galerie Lambert Weyl, Paris.

=== Moderna Museet ===
In 1960, Hultén was named head of the Moderna Museet, shaping the museum into a powerhouse of modern art. Under Hultén, the Moderna Museet was to be one of the most dynamic contemporary art institutions of the 1960s. During his tenure, the museum played a seminal role in bridging the gap between Europe and America, staging numerous exhibitions with works by early modern artists like Vincent van Gogh, modernists Paul Klee, René Magritte, Jackson Pollock and Wassily Kandinsky, and also Swedish artists including Sven Erixson, Bror Hjorth and Sigrid Hjertén.

Hultén organized theme exhibitions including 4 Americans in 1962 with pop artists Robert Rauschenberg and Jasper Johns, and did solo exhibitions with Claes Oldenburg, Andy Warhol and Edward Kienholz. Followed in 1964 by one of the first European surveys of American Pop art. In return, Hultén was invited to curate an exhibition at New York's Museum of Modern Art in 1968: his first historical and Interdisciplinary show, it explored the machine in art, photography, and industrial design.

Following Önskemuseet (The Museum of our Wishes) in the winter of 1963–1964, Hultén persuaded the Swedish government a one-time grant of 5 million kronor to help the museum expand its collection with works by Ernst Ludwig Kirchner, Max Ernst, Joan Miró, Salvador Dalí, Piet Mondrian and Pablo Picasso. The museum won international fame in 1966 with the exhibition SHE – A Cathedral, which consisted of a gigantic sculpture of a reclining woman whose womb was an entrance for visitors who could experience various things inside. The artists behind the work were Niki de Saint Phalle, Jean Tinguely and Pontus Hultén himself. In 1966 he curated the first solo retrospective exhibition for surrealist artist Meret Oppenheim. The 1968 exhibition Andy Warhol, was Andy Warhol's first retrospective ever. According to author and art critic Carl-Johan Malmberg, "[Pontus Hultén] understood what good art was way before others did, and was therefore way ahead of his times."

=== Centre Pompidou ===
In 1973, Hultén left Stockholm to enter one of the most significant periods of his career. As founding director of the new museum of modern art at the Centre Georges Pompidou, which opened in 1977, Hultén organized large-scale shows that examined the making of art's history through the links between artistic capitals: Paris-Berlin, Paris-Moscow, Paris-New York, and Paris-Paris included not only art objects that ranged from Constructivist to Pop, but films, posters, documentation, and reconstructions of exhibition spaces such as Gertrude Stein's salon. Multivalent and interdisciplinary, these shows marked a paradigm shift in exhibition making, entering the collective memory of generations of artists, curators, and critics as few others have.

=== Later career ===
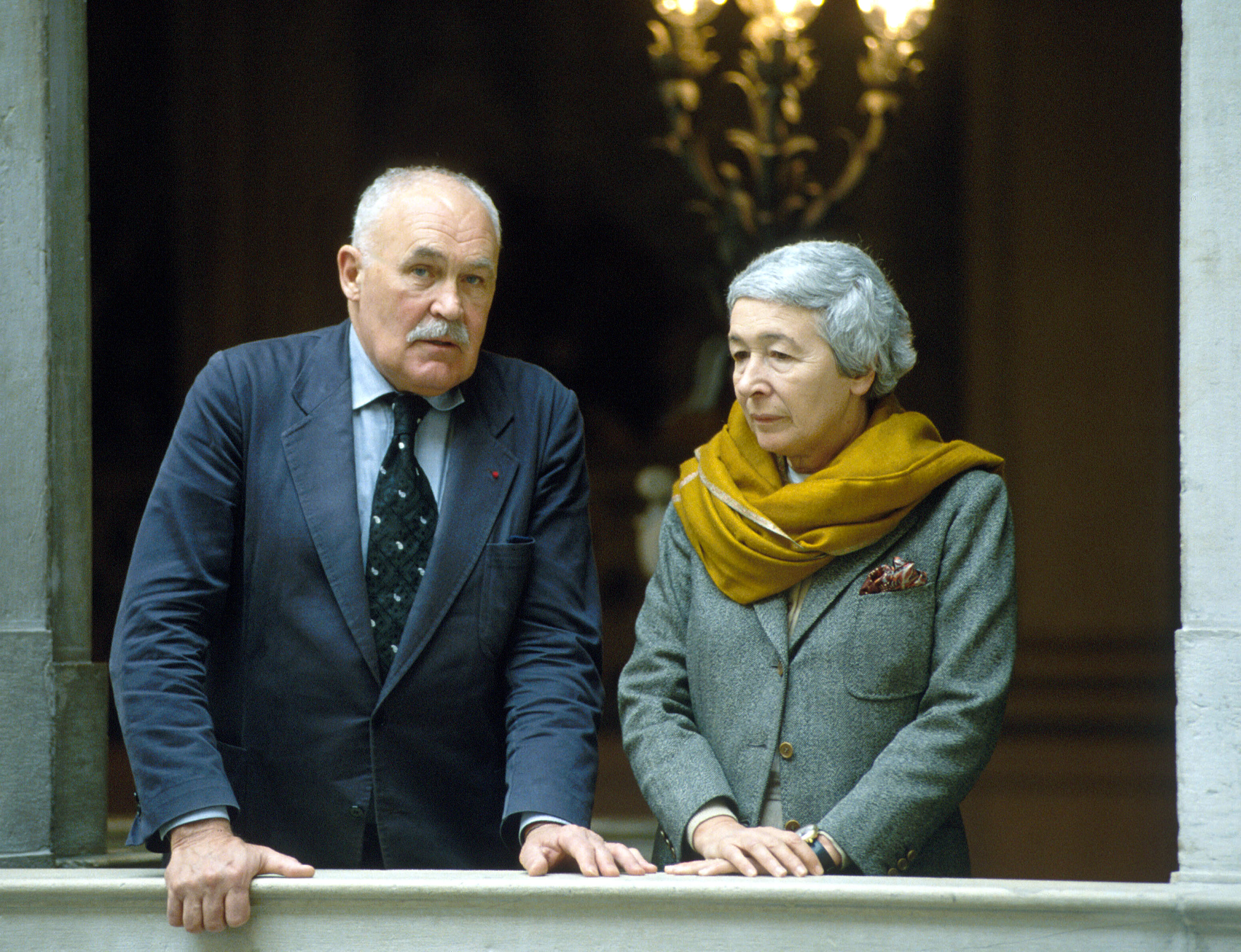
Hulten with Gae Aulenti, who redesigned the fourth floor of the Centre Pompidou (Venice, 1986)

Hultén's career after Centre Pompidou reflected the same commitment to working closely with artists that has caused so many to remember him fondly. Invited by Robert Irwin and Sam Francis to establish the Museum of Contemporary Art (MOCA). Hultén went to Los Angeles in 1980, but, after four years of infrequent exhibitions and much fundraising, returned to Europe. In 1984–1990, he was in charge of Palazzo Grassi in Venice, and in 1985, he founded, along with Daniel Buren, Serge Fauchereau, and Sarkis, the Institut des Hautes Études en Arts Plastiques in Paris, which Hultén described as a cross between the Bauhaus and Black Mountain College. In 1991–1995, Hultén was the artistic director of the Kunst- und Ausstellungshalle der Bundesrepublik Deutschland in Bonn. He later became the director of the Jean Tinguely Museum in Basel, where he curated the inaugural exhibition. Of Pontus Hultén, Niki de Saint Phalle once said, "[he had] the soul of an artist, not of a museum director."

Pontus Hultén is also known for selling exhibition copies of Andy Warhol's boxes. These boxes were copies created around 1990, in the south of Sweden, on the direction of Pontus Hultén which he later sold for millions. Some were also given (donated) to the Swedish Modern Museum. These boxes have recently been "downgraded" by the Andy Warhol Art Authentication Board.

=== Legacy ===
Pontus Hultén defined the museum as an elastic and open space, hosting a plethora of activities within its walls: lectures, film series, concerts, and debates. Hultén always maintained a very special dialogue with artists, establishing lifelong friendships with Sam Francis, Jean Tinguely, Greg Colson and Niki de St. Phalle, whose careers he not only followed but shaped from the start. Hultén devoted his life to art and being an avid art collector, he donated his private collection of 700 works to the Moderna Museet in November 2005. One of his requests was that the donated works should not be hung as part of the collection, but should be accessible to the public in a user-friendly viewing storehouse – a typically Hulténesque solution that would give the public the freedom to browse among the masterpieces as in an art library. After retiring, he lived his last years in Paris and in Stockholm where he died.

== Publications ==
- Evans, Angela Care (2001). "Sutton Hoo and Snape, Vendel and Valsgärde". In Hultén, Pontus & von Plessen, Marie-Louise (eds.). The true story of the Vandals. Museum Vandalorum Publications. Vol. 1. Värnamo: Museum Vandalorum. pp. 48–64. ISSN 1650-5549.
