= Pop Art Festival =

Annual art festival held in Sarajevo, Bosnia & Herzegovina

- Status: active
- Genre: Art festival
- Location: Sarajevo
- Country: Bosnia and Herzegovina
- Years active: 2017 - present

The Pop Art Festival is an annual art festival held in Sarajevo, Bosnia and Herzegovina. It was established in 2017 by the Sarajevo-based cultural association Pogon in cooperation with the Academy of Performing Arts in Sarajevo, the Historical Museum of Bosnia and Herzegovina and the iMTM Institute. It is held in May and lasts for three days.

The festival was founded with the goal of promoting pop cultural and pop artistic expressional forms, as well as promoting Sarajevan urban culture. It runs programmes for design and comic book art, acting and puppetry, painting and statuary and electronic music production. Each programme entails workshops and exhibitions, while the music production programme also hosts a DJ competition.

The festival also showcases student theatre productions from the Academy of Performing Arts, a radio production seminar and organizes an annual exhibition and panel discussion on Hip-hop culture that is held in the Obala Open Scene.
