= Documenta 14 =

2017 art exhibition in Kassel, Germany

logo documenta 14

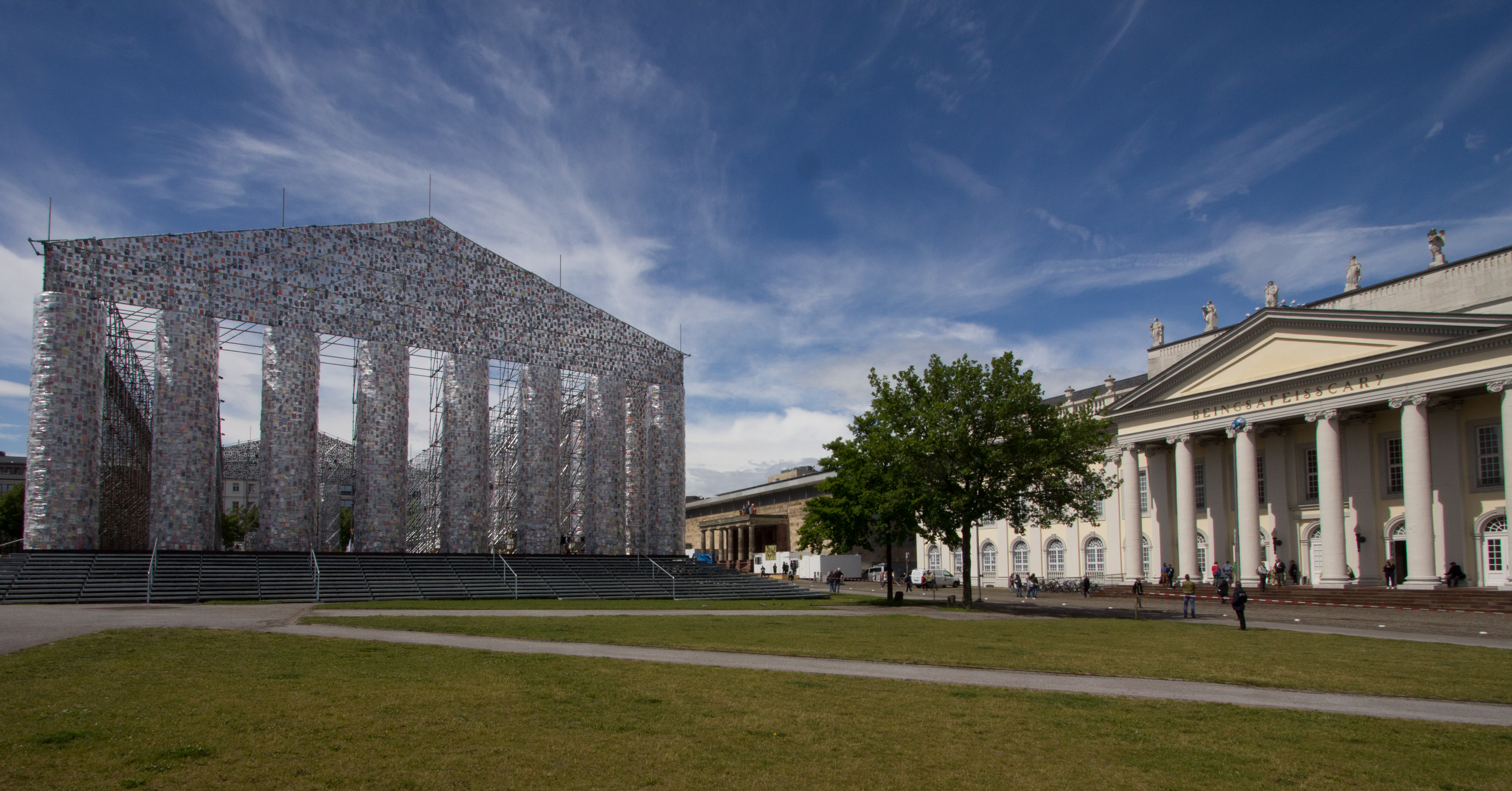
The Parthenon of Books

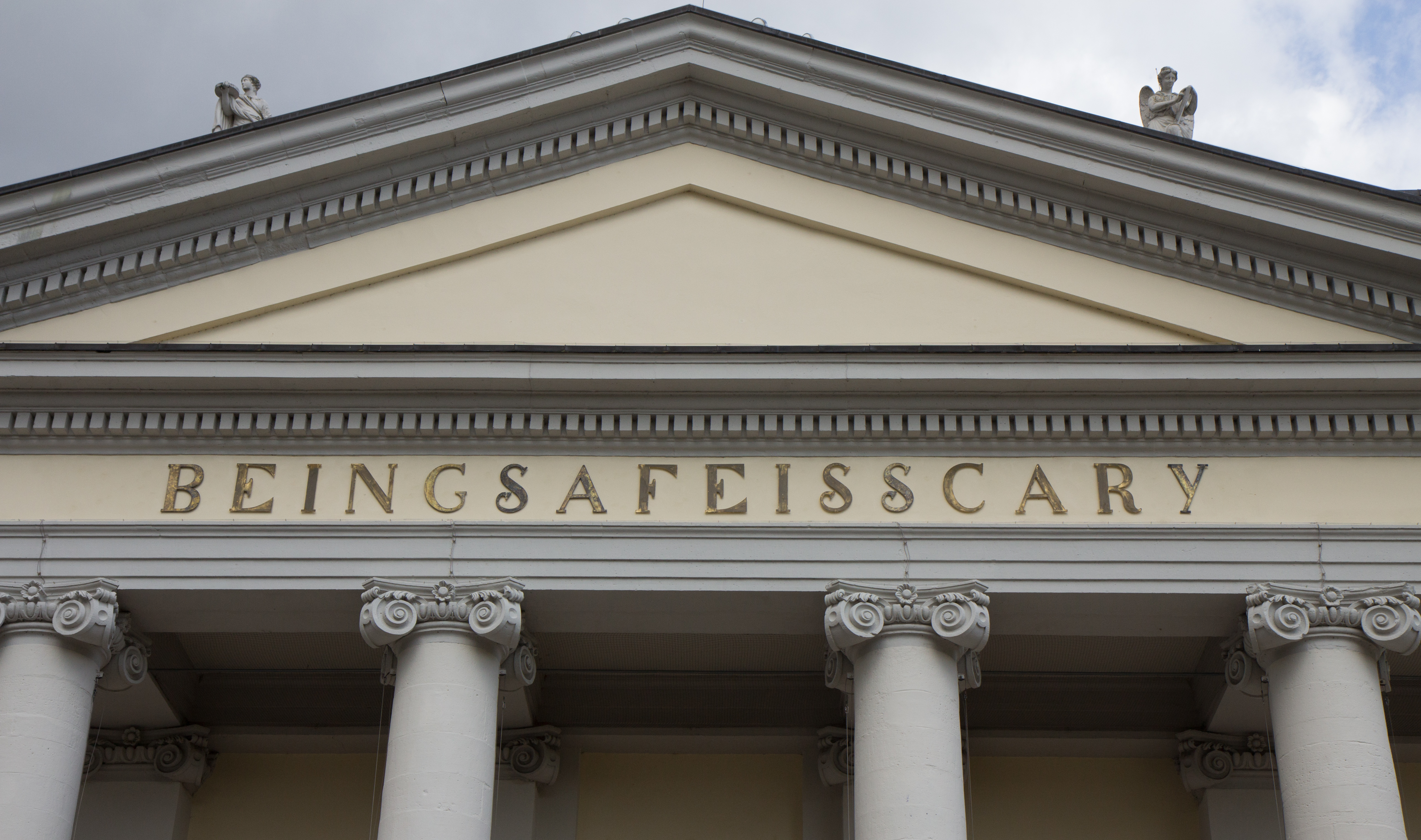
Fridericianum

Documenta 14 was the fourteenth edition of the art exhibition documenta which took place in 2017 in both Kassel, Germany, its traditional home, and Athens, Greece. It was held first in Athens from 8 April to 16 July, and in Kassel from 10 June to 17 September 2017. As part of the concept of the artistic director Adam Szymczyk, the exhibition proceeded in both countries with most featured artists working at both locations.

The documenta is a series of contemporary art exhibitions. It takes place every five years (originally every four years) and lasts 100 days each; It is therefore also referred to as a museum of 100 days. The first documenta was organized in 1955 and went back to the initiative of Arnold Bode. The location of the Documenta is normally Kassel.

== Critics of concept and implementation ==
At the time of documenta, the Athens Biennale took place in parallel in Athens. The program of the biennale, which has been taking place since 2007, was designed as a counter-proposal to the German art show.

Many Greek artists questioned the ability of Germans to explain who they were. The documenta is aimed primarily at foreign tourists and not at the residents of Athens. The Athens artist Poka-Yio said that “this exhibition could just as easily have taken place in Zurich, in Basel or anywhere else”.

== Participants ==
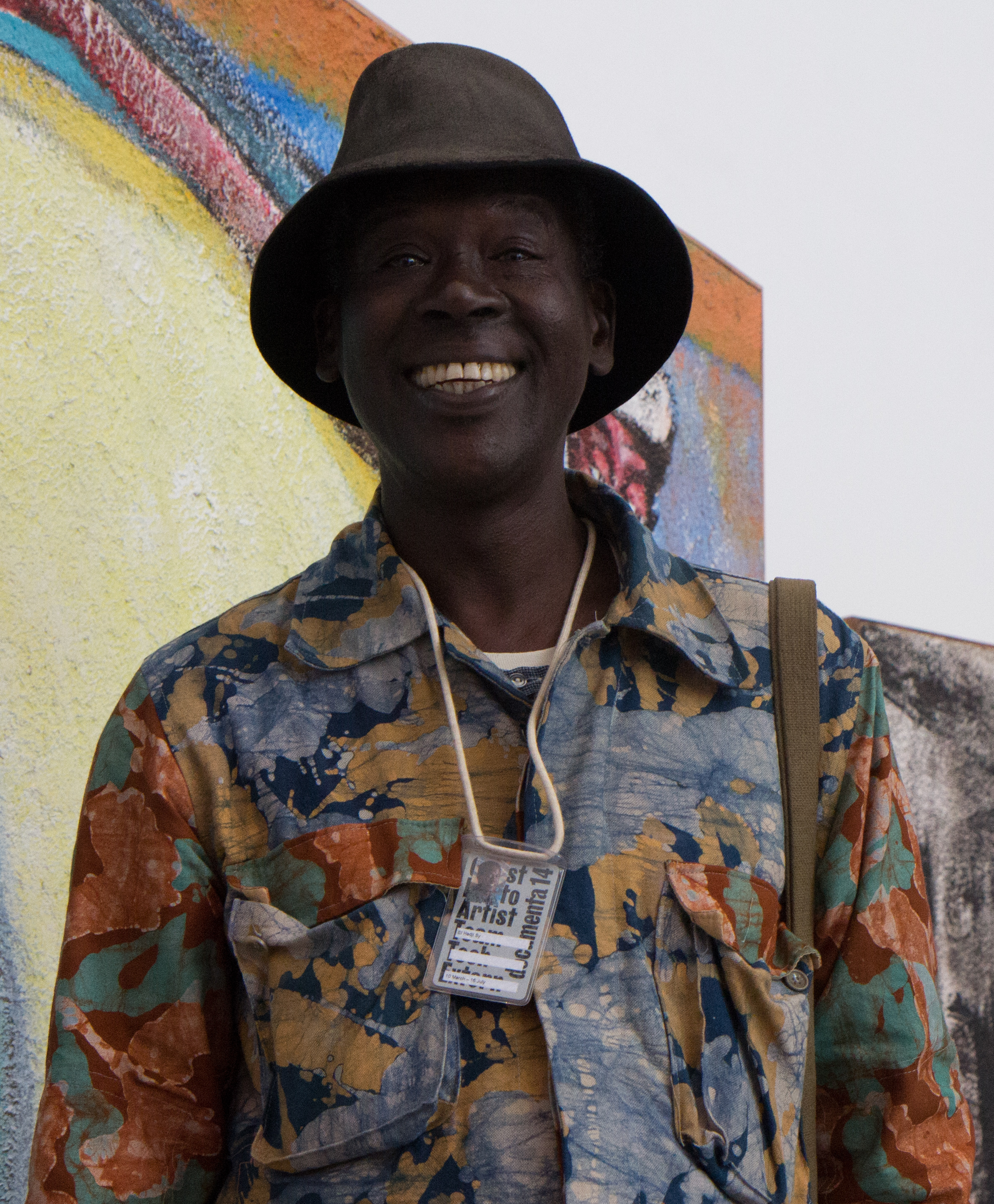
El Hadji Sy

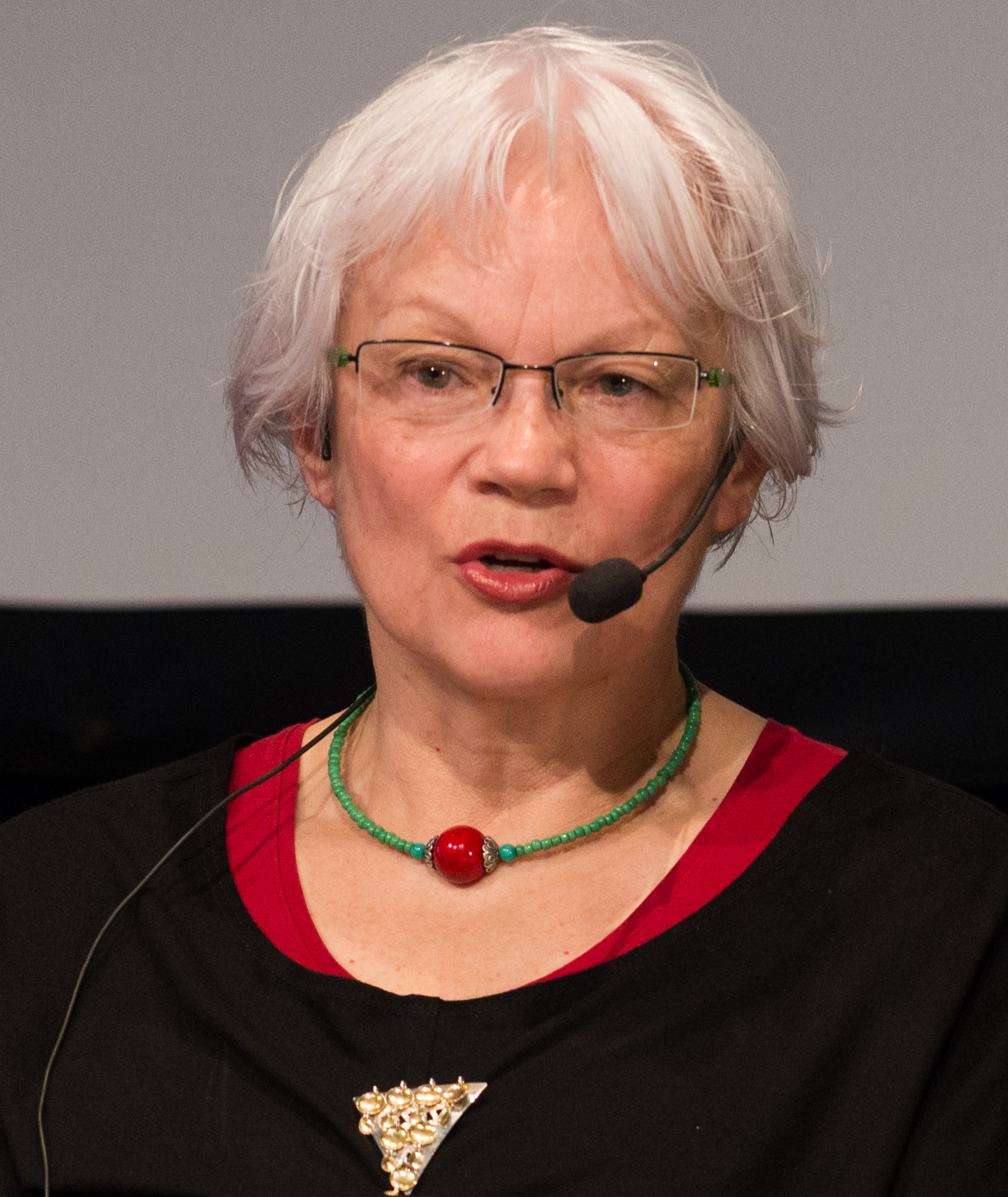
Britta Marakatt-Labba

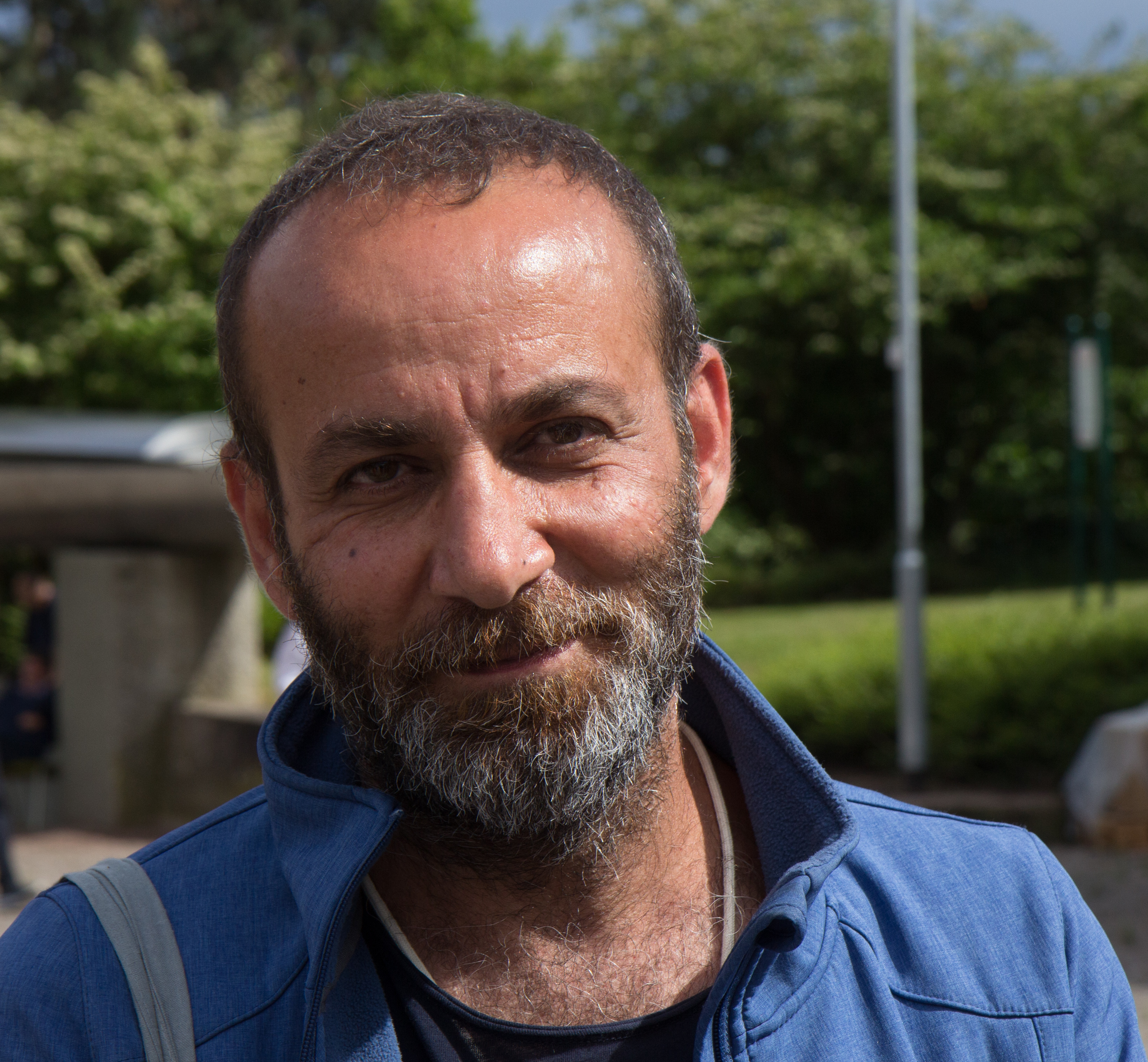
Hiwa K

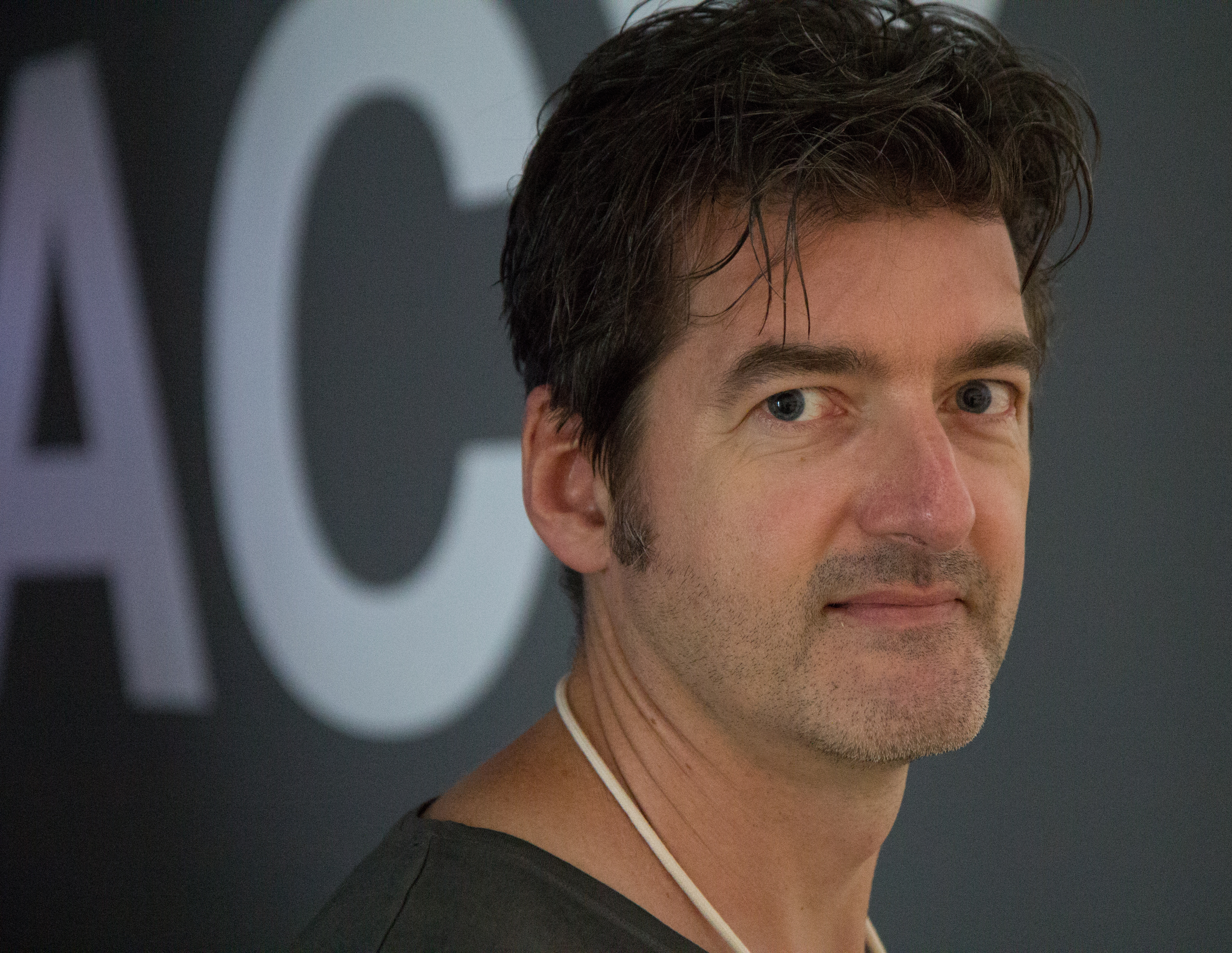
Oliver Ressler

- A Abounaddara, Akinbode Akinbiyi, Nevin Aladağ, Daniel García Andújar, Danai Anesiadou, Andreas Angelidakis, Aristide Antonas, Rasheed Araeen, Michel Auder
- B Alexandra Bachzetsis, Nairy Baghramian, Sammy Baloji, Arben Basha, Rebecca Belmore, Sokol Beqiri, Roger Bernat, Bili Bidjocka, Llambi Blido, Ross Birrell, Nomin Bold, Pavel Brăila, Geta Brătescu
- C Miriam Cahn, María Magdalena Campos Pons and Neil Leonard, Vija Celmins, Banu Cennetoğlu, Panos Charalambous, Nikhil Chopra, Ciudad Abierta, Marie Cool Fabio Balducci
- D Anna Daučíková, Moyra Davey, Agnes Denes, Yael Davids, Manthia Diawara
- E Maria Eichhorn, Hans Eijkelboom, Niño de Elche, Bonita Ely, Theo Eshetu
- F Aboubakar Fofana, Peter Friedl
- G Guillermo Galindo, Regina José Galindo, Israel Galván, Pélagie Gbaguidi, Apostolos Georgiou, Yervant Gianikian and Angela Ricci Lucchi, Gauri Gill, Marina Gioti, Beatriz González, Douglas Gordon
- H Hans Haacke, Hiwa K, Constantinos Hadzinikolaou, Irena Haiduk, Ganesh Haloi, Anna Halprin, Dale Harding, David Harding, Maria Hassabi, Edi Hila, Susan Hiller, Olaf Holzapfel, Gordon Hookey
- I iQhiya Collective, Sanja Iveković
- K Amar Kanwar, Romuald Karmakar, Andreas Ragnar Kassapis, Anton Kats, Bouchra Khalili, Daniel Knorr
- L Katalin Ladik, David Lamelas, Gerhard Lang, Rick Lowe, Alvin Lucier, Gym Lumbera
- M Ibrahim Mahama, Narimane Mari, Hans Ragnar Mathisen/KeviselieMata Aho Collective (with Bridget Reweti, Sarah Hudson, Terri Te Tau, Erena Baker), Mattin with Dafni Krazoudi, Danai Liodaki, Ioannis Sarris and Eleni Zervou, Jonas Mekas, Angela Melitopoulos, Phia Ménard, Lala Meredith-Vula, Gernot Minke, Marta Minujín, Naeem Mohaiemen, Danny Matthys
- N Joar Nango, Mari Narimane, Otobong Nkanga, Kettly Noël, Hasan Nallbani, Rosalind Nashashibi and Nashashibi/Skaer, Negros Tou Moria (Kevin Zans Ansong)
- O Emeka Ogboh, Olu Oguibe, Rainer Oldendorf, Pauline Oliveros, Joaquín Orellana Mejía
- P Christos Papoulias, Véréna Paravel and Lucien Castaing-Taylor, Dan Peterman, Angelo Plessas, Nathan Pohio, William Pope.L, Postcommodity, Prinz Gholam
- Q R. H. Quaytman
- R Oliver Ressler, Pedro G. Romero, Ben Russell, Abel Rodríguez, Tracey Rose, Roee Rosen, Lala Rukh, Arin Rungjang
- S Georgia Sagri, Sámi Artist Group (Britta Marakatt-Labba, Keviselie/Hans Ragnar Mathisen, Synnøve Persen), Khvay Samnang, Máret Ánne Sara, Ashley Hans Scheirl, Marilou Schultz David Schutter, Algirdas Šeškus, Nilima Sheikh, Ahlam Shibli, Zef Shoshi, So Crates, Mounira Al Solh, Annie Sprinkle and Beth Stephens, Eva Stefani, K. G. Subramanyan, Vivian Suter, El Hadji Sy
- T Ariuntugs Tserenpil, Terre Thaemlitz, Kidlat Tahimik
- U Piotr Uklański
- V Cecilia Vicuña, Annie Vigier & Franck Apertet (les gens d’Uterpan), Antonio Vega Macotela
- W Wang Bing, Lois Weinberger, Elisabeth Wild, Stanley Whitney, Ruth Wolf-Rehfeldt, Ulrich Wüst
- X Zafos Xagoraris
- Z Sergio Zevallos, Mary Zygouri, Artur Żmijewski

== Deceased artists or defunct groups whose works were included ==
- A Stephen Antonakos (1926–2013), Arseny Avraamov (1886–1944)
- B Étienne Baudet (c. 1638–1711), Franz Boas (1858–1942), Lorenza Böttner (1959–1994), Lucius Burckhardt (1925–2003) & Annemarie Burckhardt (1930–2012), Abdurrahim Buza (1905–1986)
- C Vlassis Caniaris (1928–2011), Sotir Capo (1934–2012), Cornelius Cardew (1936–1981), Ulises Carrión (1941–1989), Agim Çavdarbasha (1944–1999), Jani Christou (1926–1970), Chryssa (1933–2013), Andre du Colombier (1952–2003)
- D Bia Davou (1932–1996), Ioannis Despotopoulos (1903–1992), Beau Dick (1955–2017), Thomas Dick (1877–1927)
- E Maria Ender (1897–1942)
- F Forough Farrokhzad (1935–1967)
- G Tomislav Gotovac (1937–2010)
- H Nikos Hadjikyriakos-Ghikas (1906–1994), Oskar Hansen (1922–2005), Sedje Hemon (1923–2011)
- K Tshibumba Kanda Matulu (1947–1981 disappeared), Kel Kodheli (1918–2006), Spiro Kristo (1936–2011), KSYME-CMRC (founded 1979)
- L Maria Lai (1919–2013), George Lappas (1950–2016)
- M Ernest Mancoba (1904–2002), Oscar Masotta (1930–1979), Pandi Mele (1939–2015), Benode Behari Mukherjee (1904–1980)
- N Krzysztof Niemczyk (1938–1994)
- P Benjamin Patterson (1934–2016), Ivan Peries (1921–1988), David Perlov (1930–2003), André Pierre (1915–2005), Dimitris Pikionis (1887–1968),
- R Anne Charlotte Robertson (1949–2012), Erna Rosenstein (1913–2004)
- S Scratch Orchestra (1969–1974), Allan Sekula (1951–2013), Foto Stamo (1916–1989), Gani Strazimiri (1915–1993), Władysław Strzemiński (1893–1952), Alina Szapocznikow (1926–1973)
- T Yannis Tsarouchis (1910–1989)
- W Lionel Wendt (1900–1944), Basil Wright (1907–1987), Andrzej Wróblewski (1927–1957)
- X Iannis Xenakis (1922–2001)
- Z Androniqi Zengo Antoniu (1913–2000), Pierre Zucca (1943–1995)

== Participants of the documenta 14 Radio Program ==
- A AGF (Antye Greie-Ripatti), Leo Asemota, Gilles Aubry
- B Younes Baba-Ali, Serge Baghdassarians, Boris Baltschun, Rashad Becker, Gívan Belá, Ylva Bentancor, Caroline Bergvall, Nicholas Bussmann, Black Spirituals, Anna Bromley, Alessandro Bosetti, Halida Boughriet
- C Aslı Çavuşoğlu, Maria Chavez, Michele Ciacciofera, Jace Clayton, Alvin Curran, Charles Curtis, Alberto De Campo
- D drog_A_tek (Paranormale, S.T.M.C, Elektroware, Voltnoi Brege & Quetempo)
- E Theo Eshetu, Tim Etchells
- F Keir Fraser
- G Dani Gal, Christian Galarreta, Sanchayan Ghosh
- H Satch Hoyt, Mwangi Hutter
- I Islands Songs (Nicolas Perret & Silvia Ploner)
- K Felix Kubin
- L Brandon LaBelle, Achim Lengerer
- M Robert Millis, Mobile Radio (Knut Aufermann and Sarah Washington), Marco Montiel-Soto, Nástio Mosquito
- N Olaf Nicolai
- O Emeka Ogboh, Ahmet Öğüt, Aki Onda
- P Postcommodity
- R Anna Raimondo, Marina Rosenfeld
- S Jan-Peter E. R. Sonntag, Soundwalk Collective (Stephan Crasneanscki, Simone Merli & Kamran Sadeghi), Natascha Sadr Haghighian
- T Nasan Tur
- W Hong-Kai Wang, James Webb, Jan St. Werner
- Y Yan Jun, Samson Young

== See also ==
- Exergue – on documenta 14
