= Daučík =

Daučík (masculine), Daučíková (feminine) is a Slovak surname. People with the surname include:

- Ferdinand Daučík (1914–1986), Slovak footballer
- Yanko Daucik (1941–2017), footballer, son of above
- Anna Daučíková
