= James Webb (South African artist) =

South African artist (born 1975)

- Born: June 20, 1975 (age 50); Kimberley, Northern Cape
- Education: University of Cape Town
- Known for: Conceptual art, Sound art, installation art
- Notable work: Prayer, A series of personal questions, There's No Place Called Home, Scream
- Awards: 2008 ABSA L’Atelier Award
- Website: http://www.theotherjameswebb.com/

James Webb (born June 20, 1975 in Kimberley, Northern Cape) is a South African artist best known for his interventions and installations incorporating sound. His sound installations place special emphasis on the sourcing and presentation of the sound clips, as well as the social significance and context of these sounds. Often referred to as a "collector of sounds," Webb is interested in the role that aural events play in our everyday life. The physical presentation of the work, including the installation space and the logistics of speakers, are also deliberate choices for Webb.

Webb received the 2008 ABSA L'Atelier Award and his work is featured in many private and public collections, including the Tate Modern, Art Institute of Chicago, MAXXI, Kadist, Khalid Shoman Foundation, Iziko South African National Gallery, the Johannesburg Art Gallery, and the Nelson Mandela Metropolitan Art Museum.

== Education ==
Webb received his BA in Drama and Comparative Religion at the University of Cape Town in 1996.

== Monographs ==
To date, there are 2 monographs dedicated to the work of James Webb. The first, "Xenagogue," was edited by Anthea Buys, and published by the Hordaland Kunstsenter Press in 2015, for his exhibition of the same name. The second, "...", was edited by Hannah Lewis, and published by blank.

- Xenagogue, edited by Anthea Buys, Hordaland Kunstsenter, 2015 ISBN 978-82-93366-02-7
- ..., edited by Hannah Lewis, blank projects, 2020 ISBN 978-0-620-86816-7

== Catalogues ==
- As yet untitled, edited by Khanya Mashabela, Norval Foundation, 2021 ISBN 978-1-7764005-1-5

== Artworks ==
- 2000 - ongoing: "Prayer"
- 2004 - ongoing: "There's no place called home"
- 2008: "Scream"
- 2010 - ongoing: "There is a light that never goes out"
- 2011: "Telephone Voice"
- 2016 - ongoing: "A series of personal questions"
- 2020: "There is a voice other than the one you are hearing"
- 2020: "This is where I leave you"
- 2021 "Nothing here does not hear you"

== Solo exhibitions ==
2024

- "The Moon Will Not Stay Hidden Forever," Liljevalchs Konsthall, Stockholm, Sweden

2021

- "Nothing here does not hear you," National Arts Festival, Makhanda, South Africa
- "As yet untitled," Norval Sculpture Garden, Norval Foundation, Cape Town, South Africa

2020

- "What Fresh Hell Is This," blank projects, Cape Town, South Africa

2019

- "Choose The Universe," Galerie Imane Farès, Paris, France
- "Three Dreams Of The Sinking World," Pool Space, Johannesburg, South Africa

2018

- "James Webb: Prayer," The Art Institute of Chicago, Chicago, United States of America
- "The dreamer in me meets the dreamer in you," Norrtälje Konsthall, Norrtälje, Sweden
- "It’s Not What It Looks Like," SPACES, Cleveland, United States of America

2016

- "We Listen For The Future," Yorkshire Sculpture Park, Wakefield, United Kingdom
- "Hope Is A Good Swimmer," Galerie Imane Farès, Paris, France
- "Ecstatic Interference," blank projects, Cape Town, South Africa

2015

- "Xenagogue," curated by Anthea Buys, HKS, Bergen, Norway

2014

- "The Two Insomnias," blank projects, Cape Town, South Africa

2013

- "Audiopolis," curated by Francisco López (musician), CentroCentro, Madrid, Spain

2012

- "MMXII," Johannesburg Art Gallery, Johannesburg, South Africa

2010

- "Terms Of Surrender," ABSA Gallery, Johannesburg, South Africa
- "Untitled States," curated by Anna Douglas, mac, Birmingham, United Kingdom
- "Prayer," Djanogly Gallery, Nottingham, United Kingdom
- "One day, all of this will be yours," blank projects, Cape Town, South Africa
- "Aleph," Goethe On Main, Johannesburg, South Africa

2008

- "Prayer," Huddersfield Art Gallery, United Kingdom

2006

- Untitled, blank projects, Cape Town, South Africa

== Group exhibitions ==
2024

- "Between Rivers," Astrup Fearnley Museet, Oslo, Norway
- "Makeshift Memorials, Small Revolutions," Blaffer Art Museum, Houston, Texas, United States of America

2023

- "Goodbye to Love," Marres, Maastricht, The Netherlands
- "You to me, Me to you," A4 Arts Foundation, Cape Town, South Africa
- "The Sound – Sonic Art in Public Spaces," 2nd Monheim Triennale, Monheim am Rhein
- 14th MONA FOMA, curated by Brian Ritchie, Tasmania, Australia
- "À bruit secret," Museum Tinguely, Basel, Switzerland

2022

- "Manifesto of Fragility," 16th Lyon Biennale, Lyon, France
- "The Future Is Behind Us," A4 Arts Foundation, Cape Town, South Africa

2021

- "The Normal," Talbot Rice Gallery, Edinburgh, Scotland

2020

- "AUDIOSPHERE: Social Experimental Audio, Pre- and Post-Internet," Museo Nacional Centro de Arte Reina Sofía, Madrid, Spain

2019

- "Open Borders," Biennial of Curitiba, Museu Oscar Niemeyer, Curitiba, Brazil
- Blickachsen 12, Bad Homburg, Germany
- Sharjah Film Platform, Sharjah Art Foundation, Sharjah, United Arab Emirates

2018

- "African Metropolis," curated by Simon Njami and Elena Motisi, MAXXI, Rome, Italy
- "The Red Hour," 13th Dakar Biennale, curated by Simon Njami, Senegal
- "Common Ground," Yorkshire Sculpture Park, Wakefield, United Kingdom

2017

- "The Lotus in spite of the Swamp," curated by Trevor Schoonmaker for the 4th Prospect triennial of New Orleans
- "Ways of Seeing," curated by Till Fellrath and Sam Bardaouil, Arter, Istanbul, Turkey
- "Ways of Seeing," curated by Till Fellrath and Sam Bardaouil, Boghossian Foundation, Brussels, Belgium
- "Picasso et la maternité," curated by Florence Saragoza, Musée Crozatier, Le Puy-en-Vela, France
- "BECOMING AN APRICOT, An Apple, A Crow, A Tree, A Cockroach, A Glacier, A Plant, A Mushroom, A Shell, A bird, Algae," curated by Jonatan Habib Engqvist, Solvita Krese, Inga Lāce for Survival Kit 9, Riga, Latvia
- "Image Drain," curated by Anthea Buys for the 4th Tallinn Photo Month biennale, Tallinn Art Hall, Estonia
- "Tous, des sang mêles," curated by Frank Lamy and Julie Crenn, Musée d'Art Contemporain du Val-de-Marne, Paris
- "Every Time An Ear Di Soun," curated by Bonaventure Soh Bejeng Ndikung and co-curated by Marcus Gammel, documenta 14 radio
- "Afriques Capitales," curated by Simon Njami, La Villette, Paris
- "Tamawuj," 13th Sharjah Biennial, curated by Christine Tohmé, UAE

2016

- "History Unfolds," curated by Helene Larsson Pousette, Swedish History Museum, Stockholm, Sweden
- "Malmös Leende," curated by Edi Muka, Malmö, Sweden
- Le Voyage à Nantes, Nantes, France
- "A Place In Time," curated by Dr. Helen Pheby, Nirox Foundation, South Africa

2015

- "Between the idea and the experience," 12th Havana Biennial, Havana, Cuba
- "Barriers," curated by Elisabeth Millqvist, Wanås Castle, Hässleholm, Sweden
- "Nous نحن," Galerie Imane Farès, Paris, France, with Ninar Esber

2014

- "Frestas," Trienal of Sorocaba, curated by Josué Mattos, Sorocaba, Brazil
- "New Biennale of Art and Architecture Fittja," curated by Joanna Sandell, Botkyrka Konsthall, Stockholm, Sweden
- "Bleu Brut - Experience Pommery 12," Vranken-Pommery, Reims, France
- "Helicotrema," curated by Blauer Hase, Viafraini, Milano, Italy

2013

- "Imaginary Fact," curated by Brent Meersman, South African Pavilion, 55th Venice Biennale, Italy
- "Between The Lines," curated by Eva Scharrer, Former Tagesspiegel Building, Berlin, Germany
- "No Limit 2," Galerie Imane Farès, Paris, France
- "Let me lose myself," Skogskyrkogården, Stockholm, Sweden

2012

- "Experience Pommery 10," curated by Bernard Blistène and Jean Marie Gallais, Vranken-Pommery, Reims, France
- abc Art Berlin Contemporary, Station Berlin, Berlin, Germany
- Fierce Festival, curated by Laura McDermott and Harun Morrison, various venues, Birmingham, United Kingdom
- "In Other Words: the black market of translation," curated by Elena Agudio, NGBK, Berlin, Germany

2011

- Fierce Festival, Birmingham, United Kingdom
- "Experience Pommery 9," curated by Claire Staebler and Charles Carcopino, Vranken-Pommery, Reims, France
- Répondeur, curated by Rahma Khazam, Palais de Tokyo, Paris, France

2010

- "Sentences On The Banks and other activities," Darat Al-Funun, Amman, Jordan
- "Reflex / Reflexión," Johannesburg Art Gallery, South Africa
- Article Biennale, various venues, Stavanger, Norway
- My World Images, various venues, Copenhagen, Denmark
- "Istanbul, Athens, Marrakech, Palermo, Catania," RISO Museo d’Arte Contemporanea della Sicilia, Palermo
- "In Other Words," Goodman Gallery, Johannesburg, South Africa
- "Twenty," Nirox Foundation, Johannesburg, South Africa
- "Contemporary Artists From South Africa," Stiftelsen 314, Bergen, Norway
- "Ampersand," Daimler Contemporary, Berlin, Germany
- "No Soul For Sale," L'appartement 22 / Tate Modern, London, United Kingdom
- "1910 – 2010," Iziko South African National Gallery, Cape Town, South Africa
- "Printemps des Poétes," Salon de lecture, Musée du quai Branly, Paris

2009

- "Happy House," Kunst im Tunnel, Düsseldorf, Germany
- 3rd Arts In Marrakech Biennale, Marrakech Museum, Morocco
- "L’effacement des traces," Musée d'histoire contemporaine, Paris, France
- Melbourne International Arts Festival, Melbourne, Australia
- CAPE 09, Cape Town’s second biennale of contemporary African Culture, various venues, Cape Town, South Africa
- "This Is Now 2," L’appartement 22, Rabat, Morocco

2008

- "Jozi & The (M)Other City," Michaelis Gallery, Cape Town, South Africa
- "Home Bound," Stiftung Kunst:Raum Sylt Quelle, Sylt, Germany
- "za. Giovane arte dal Sud Africa," Palazzo delle Papesse Centro Arte Contemporanea, Siena, Italy
- "This Is Now 1," Joburg Art Fair, South Africa
- "Light Show," Bank Gallery, Durban, South Africa

2007

- "The History of a Decade that has not yet been Named," 9th Lyon Biennale, curated by Hans Ulrich Obrist and Stephanie Moisdon, Lyon, France
- "Beau Diable," Gallery In The Round, Makanda, South Africa
- "Sakra!," St. Andrä, Graz, Austria
- 3C, Critic’s Choice Exhibition, Association for Visual Arts, Cape Town
- "(In)visible Sounds," Netherlands Media Art Institute, Amsterdam (With Brandon LaBelle)
- "Afterlife," Michael Stevenson Contemporary, Cape Town

2002

- "Phonosynthesizer," US Art Gallery, Stellenbosch, South Africa
