= Gbaguidi =

Gbaguidi is a surname. Notable people with the surname include:

- Daniel Gbaguidi (born 1988), Beninese footballer
- Pélagie Gbaguidi (born 1965), Beninese artist
