= Exergue – on documenta 14 =

2024 Greek documentary film

exergue – on documenta 14
- 2024 film poster
- Directed by: Dimitris Athiridis
- Written by: Adam Szymszyk; Dimitris Athiridis
- Screenplay by: Dimitris Athiridis
- Story by: Dimitris Athiridis
- Produced by: Dimitris Athiridis
- Cinematography: Dimitris Athiridis
- Edited by: Dimitris Athiridis; Vanessa Zeri; Giorgos Kravatis
- Music by: Ted Regklis; Paolo Thorsen-Nagel
- Distributed by: Faliro House Productions; Greek Film Centre
- Release date: 2024
- Running time: 848 minutes
- Country: Greece
- Languages: English; German; Greek

Exergue – on documenta 14 is a 2024 Greek documentary film with a runtime of 848 minutes (14 hours and 8 minutes), making it the second-longest non-experimental film ever made. The documentary was directed by Dimitris Athiridis and had its world premiere in February 2024 at the 74th Berlin International Film Festival. The film centers on Adam Szymczyk, the artistic director of Documenta 14, and his team as they prepared for the contemporary art exhibition, which was held in Kassel and Athens in 2017.

== Plot ==
The film documents Adam Szymczyk, the artistic director of Documenta 14, and his team as they prepared the art exhibition held in Kassel and Athens in 2017. This was the first time the quinquennial art exhibition was split between two locations, a decision that provoked controversy due to logistical challenges and the perceived impact on the exhibition's coherence. The film is divided into 14 chapters, offering a behind-the-scenes view of the institutional art world, examining contemporary art's role in a changing global landscape, and exploring the politics and drama of staging exhibitions.

== Production ==
In 2015, director Dimitris Athiridis began documenting Adam Szymczyk and his team, initially planning a two-hour runtime for the film. During the early editing process, Athyridis informed the film's producer, Christos Konstantakopoulos, that the raw footage he had captured contained significantly more material than could be condensed into the initially planned two-hour runtime.

== Release ==
Upon its release, the film became the longest ever screened at the Berlin International Film Festival, surpassing the previous Berlinale record for the longest film, held by A Lullaby to the Sorrowful Mystery, directed by Filipino filmmaker Lav Diaz, which had a runtime of 485 minutes.

It will have its Australian premiere at the 72nd Sydney Film Festival, where "each screening will take place over three days in 4-5 hour segments with scheduled 15 minute intervals."

== Reception ==
Antoine Thirion of Cinema Scope wrote, "Through its jumbled structure and precision in depicting the curatorial discourse, exergue – on documenta 14 is the opposite of the story of a shipwreck: it is a successful attempt to salvage what demagogy savagely tore down." Alissa Wilkinson of The New York Times described the film as "A formidable survey of the challenges facing the contemporary art world as it wrestles with racism, colonialism, politics and power."
