= Strollology =

Field

Strollology or Promenadology is the science of strolling (German: Spaziergangswissenschaft) as a method in the field of aesthetics and cultural studies with the aim of becoming aware of the conditions of perception of the environment and enhancement of environmental perception itself. Based on traditional methods in cultural studies as well as experimental practices like taking reflective walks and aesthetic interventions. The term and special field of studies was created in the 1980s by the Swiss sociologist Lucius Burckhardt, who, at that time, was a professor at the University of Kassel, as an alternative to the technocratic centrally planned economy.

== Contemporary practice ==
The German artist Gerhard Lang, who studied strollology under Burckhardt at the University of Kassel, has continued the field in artistic practice since the early 1990s. His Mobile Zebra Crossing (1993), a procession with a portable pedestrian crossing through the streets of Kassel, was conceived in honour of Burckhardt as the founder of the discipline; His ongoing Cloud Walks series apply strollological methods to the observation of atmospheric phenomena.

== See also ==
- Psychogeography

== Bibliography ==
- Lucius Burckhardt (19 May 2015). Why is Landscape Beautiful?: The Science of Strollology. Birkhäuser. ISBN 978-3035604078.
