= Abounaddara =

Syrian video art collective

Abounaddara (translated as "the man with glasses") is a Syrian video art collective best known for its documentation of life in Syria. The collective's members are self-taught and anonymous. At the start of the Syrian popular uprising, Abounaddara posted a new short video on Vimeo in April 2011 and distributed it via social media every Friday. Their films are the antithesis of amateur footage from the Syrian civil war, often recorded by a shaky camera, with a poor or completely unnoticed tone of a moment of intense violence or emotional release. They won the 2014 Vera List Center Prize for Art and Politics. The next year, it withdrew from the Venice Biennale after one of its short films did not screen as agreed during the Biennale's Arena opening program. The group also returned its special mention from the Biennale jury. The group exhibited at New York's New Museum in 2014 and removed its videos from the Internet in 2017 after they were used in a show at Milan's La Triennale contemporary art museum.

== History ==
Beginning in 2010 in Damascus, Syria, a volunteer collective of Syrian filmmakers began working on "emergency cinema." They wished to document the life Syrians were forced to endure during the country's civil war. Abounaddara was chosen as the projects name from the first Arabic-language satirical revue, which originated in Cairo, Egypt during the 19th century. In English Abounaddara means "the man with glasses."

The anonymous collective releases one video per week on the internet whose aim is to show individual Syrians on all sides of the war in order to show an immediate image of Syrian society.

== Selected exhibitions ==
- documenta 14, 2017
- New Museum, 2014
