= Edi Hila =

Edi Hila (born 1944) is an Albanian painter. His work often chronicles the social and political transformation of Albania across the communist era, the collapse of the regime, and its aftermath. He has been described as a painter of the "Albanian transition." His work has been included in documenta 14 (2017). He has represented Albania at the Venice Biennale (1999), and his work is held in the collections of the Centre Pompidou and the National Gallery of Arts in Tirana, among others.

== Early life and education ==
Hila was born in Shkodër, Albania, in 1944. He studied painting at the National Academy of Art in Tirana, where he was trained in the socialist-realist idiom.

== Career under the communist regime ==
In the early 1970s, Hila painted Planting of Trees (variously dated 1971 or 1972), a work whose use of colour and departure from the doctrines of socialist realism brought him into conflict with dictator Hoxha regime's cultural authorities. As a result, Hila was banned from working as an artist and sentenced to several years of forced labour at a state-run poultry processing plant, where he worked loading sacks of grain. During this period, he secretly produced a series of drawings documenting the workers' lives, later known as the Poultry series (1974–77).

== Painting since 1990 ==
Following the collapse of the Hoxha regime in the early 1990s, Hila returned to painting, developing a reduced, distinctively flat style to document Albania's social and political transformation. His Comfort series (1997) responded to the 1997 collapse of pyramid investment schemes in the country, while his Boulevard series (2015) presents symmetrically composed, muted renderings of Tirana's architecture and public spaces. Hila has also taught for many years at the National Academy of Art (later the University of Fine Arts) in Tirana, where his students have included the curator Edi Muka.

== Exhibitions ==
Hila took part in the Venice Biennale in 1999, and his work was included in After the Wall at the Moderna Museet, Stockholm (1999), which travelled to the Hamburger Bahnhof, Berlin, and the Ludwig Museum, Budapest. In 2017, he participated in documenta 14 in Athens and Kassel.

In 2017–18, the Museum of Modern Art in Warsaw and the National Gallery of Arts, Tirana, jointly presented Edi Hila: Painter of Transformation, the artist's first retrospective in Albania, accompanied by a monograph published by Sternberg Press. In 2025–26, the Hamburger Kunsthalle and Moderna Museet Malmö jointly presented a suvery exhibition of Hila's work.

His work is held in the collections of the Centre Pompidou, Paris; the Museum of Modern Art, Warsaw; the National Gallery of Arts, Tirana; the Fonds municipal d'art contemporain de la Ville de Paris; and FRAC Pays de la Loire, among others. He is represented by Galerie Mitterrand, Paris.
