= Pélagie Gbaguidi =

Beninese artist

- Born: 1965 (age 60–61); Dakar, Senegal
- Education: l'École des beaux-arts Saint-Luc
- Known for: Multi-media
- Notable work: Le Code Noir; The Missing Link. Dicolonisation Education by Mrs Smiling Stone; Care

Pélagie Gbaguidi (born 1965) is a Beninese multi-media artist who lives and works in Brussels. Gbaguidi self-identifies as a contemporary griot, using her artistic mediums to create pieces related to colonial and post-colonial history, trauma, and the reframing of stories, experiences, and identities which have been overlooked in these historical legacies. Her work is included in the permanent collections of cultural institutions such as the Mémorial ACTe centre in Guadeloupe, Illinois Holocaust Museum & Education Center in Chicago, Casa África in Las Palmas de Gran Canaria, Artothèque of Saint Denis de la Réunion, Mu.ZEE in Belgium, and Kanal - Centre Pompidou in Belgium.

== Biography ==
Gbaguidi was born in Dakar in 1965. She studied art in Liège, Belgium, at l'École des beaux-arts Saint-Luc, and graduated in 1995.

== Work ==
The artist calls herself a contemporary "griot” — traditionally meaning a vessel for West African oral tradition, it is an intermediary between the physical realm and that of the ancestors who uses art and music as their means of translation. A griot questions the individual experience by absorbing the words of the ancients and modeling them into art to be interpreted by their living descendants.

Her art is an anthology of the signs and traces of trauma, and is centered on archiving colonial and postcolonial African history. With her work, she aims to unmask the process of forgetting the most violent hardships of the past. In venturing to unveil these suppressed memories, the abstract ideas she addresses seem to arouse in the artist an urgency to give them form, this need to create liberating images becoming a corpus from which to draw contemporary forms.

Inspired by her residency at the Centre des Arts Contemporains in Nantes, Gbaguidi created a large series of drawings and paintings in 2004 titled Le Code Noir, which references the French code for slavery conduct that was conceived by Louis XIV's court and in use from 1685–1848. The project seeks to confront the violence enacted by these slavery regulations, and 100 drawings from the series were purchased by the Mémorial ACTe centre in Guadeloupe. In 2017, she created The Missing Link. Dicolonisation Education by Mrs Smiling Stone, a large-scale installation commissioned for Documenta 14. The multi-media work focuses on how the history of subjects like slavery, Nazism, and Apartheid are taught, and features objects such as school desks and tables, drawings on transparent paper, photographs, music recordings, and videos. In 2019-2020, she created Care, a fabric-based work that resembles a tent and consists of a colorful embroidered plastic flour sack, tarpaulin, and wooden beams. The work addresses the act of exchange—which is referenced through both the inclusion of common trades materials like burlap sacks and the use of an embroidery technique that she learned from local women in Essaouira, Morocco, during an artist residency there.

== Exhibitions ==
- 2021 - "Congoville", MIDDELHEIM MUSEUM, Antwerp (Belgium) May 2021; CENTRALE for contemporary art, Brussels (Belgium) March, 2021
- 2020 - "Somewhere in the World", FORUM FROHNER, Krems (Austria); "B:11 Berlin Biennale. The Crack Begins Within", Berlin (Germany) 05/09/2020-01/11/2020.
- 2019 - "Décoloniser les corps" in the context of the Festival Désir...Désirs, curated by Pascal Lièvre. Tours (France); "Somewhere in the World", FORUM FROHNER, Krems (Austria); “Généalogies futures depuis l’équateur”, Lubumbashi Biennale, Lubumbashi (Democratic Republic of the Congo).
- 2018 - "Décoloniser les corps", 2e Biennale art nOmad 2018, Limoges / Bourges / Paris / Calais / Brussels / Berlin. Curated by Pascal Lièvre; "Un-masking in the Plural", Dak'ART 13 The Red Hour A New Humanity, Dakar (Senegal); Art Brussels 50 years, Art Fair, Brussels (Belgium); "i am what i am", ici Gallery, curated by Julie Crenn, Paris (France); "Disclosed Traces and Triadic Apparitions", Sulger-Buel Lovell, curated by Mika Hayashi Ebbesen, London (UK).
- 2017 - "The Missing Link. Dicolonisation Education by Mrs Smiling Stone", documenta 14 Learning from Athens, Athens (Greece); "El iris de Lucy”, CAAM, Las Palmas de Gran Canaria (Spain); “HERstory” – Des Archives Féministes (Feminist Archives), Maison des Arts de Malakoff, Paris (France); "Afriques Capitales", La Gare Saint Sauveur, Lille (France); XXIII. Rohkunstbau: Die Schönheit im Anderen | The Beauty of Difference “Naked Writing” Palace of Lieberose (Germany); AKAA 2017 edition, Paris (France)
- 2016 - “El iris de Lucy”, Musac, Castilla y León (Spain); “L’iris de Lucy”, Musée Rouchechouart, (France); “Dakar-Matigny”, Manoir de la ville, Martigny Suisse; “1 :54” Contemporary African Art Fair”, London (United Kingdom); “El Mundo sans le corps”, Solo show Gallery Sulger-Buel-Lovell, London (United Kingdom).
- 2015 - Acquisition of 100 drawings from series Code Noir, Acte Memorial Museum, Guadeloupe (France); “Divine Comedy: Heaven, Hell, Purgatory Revisited by Contemporary African Artists”, National Museum of African Art - Smithsonian Institution, Washington (USA).
- 2014 - “Divine Comedy: Heaven, Hell, Purgatory Revisited by Contemporary African Artists”, MMK Museum für Moderne Kunst, Frankfurt (Germany); “Legitimate Abstractions”, Moroccan Pavilion Dak’Art Biennale de Dakar, Dakar (Senegal).
- 2013 - “Asyl Stadtmuseum”, Stadtmuseum, Munich (Germany); “Traces of Women”, Villa des Arts Casablanca (Morocco); “Serial Attempts” News of the World Gallery, London (United Kingdom).
- 2012 - 1st Casablanca Biennale (Marroco); “Africa Africa”, Centre of Contemporary Art (CAC) Meymac, (France).
- 2011 - “Around the Black Code”, National Orchestra Belgium with B.Giaux A.Lavoisier S.Causanchi, BOZAR, Brussels (Belgium); “As it is, Ancestral Space”, Gallery Mojo, Dubai (United Arab Emirates).
- 2010 - “Show off”, Girot Gallery, fiac off Paris, Paris (France); “Code Noir”, Apex pro e.V Gallery, (solo show) Göttingen (Germany).
- 2009 – "Africaines" 2nd Festival Panafricain, Safex, Alger; “Spot on…”, Ifa Gallery in Berlin and Ifa Gallery Stuttgart (Germany); "Legacy of Absence Collection." ILLINOIS HOLOCAUST MUSEUM AND EDUCATION CENTER, Chicago (United States)
- 2008 - IFAA Museum of Modern Art, Arnhem (Nerthelands); IFAA Afrika Museum Arnhem (Nerthelands); “Écouter et entendre”, Kevin Conru Gallery, Brussels (Belgium); “#2008 DAK’ART Afrique : Mirror?”, Dak’Art Biennale of Dakar (Senegal); “Code Noir” Musical Exhibition, Royal Music Conservatory, Brussels (Belgium); Maison des Arts, Evreux (France).
- 2007 - "Africa plural 3+3", Casa Africa, las Palmas de Gran Canaria (Spain); "Le code Noir", Factory, Krems, Autriche; Black Fine Art Show, Atlanta (USA); "Dockanema", festival du film Mozambique, Maputo, (Mozambique).
- 2006 - National Black Fine Art Show, New York (USA); 2006 Dak’Art Biennale of Contemporary African Art (Senegal); “L’homme est un mystère”, Musée d’art et d’histoire, Saint-Brieuc (France); Museum of Modern Art, Santo Domingo, (Dominican Republic).
- 2005 - National Black Fine Art Show, New York (USA); “Démarcations”, Centre Wallonie Bruxelles, Paris (France).
- 2004 - 2004 Dak’Art Biennale of Contemporary African Art, Dakar (Senegal); “A3” Contemporary Art Night, Saint-Sulpice, Paris; “Nouvelles Impressions: Beauté Afrique”, Le Lieu Unique, Nantes (France); “Sacred Rites/ Profane Rites”, AFAA (French Association of Artistic Action), Bern (Switzerland); “Sacred Rites/ Profane Rites”, AFAA (French Association of Artistic Action), Mexico.
- 2003- “Rites sacrés/ Rites profanes” Ves Rencontres Africaines de la Photographie. Bamako 2003 (Mali); Solo show, Les Alizés Gallery, Brussels (Belgium); “Rhizome”, Espace d'Art Contemporain, Torcy, (France).
- 2001 - OFF - IV Rencontres de la photographie africaine, Bamako (Mali); Museum of Modern and Contemporary Art, Liege (Belgium).

== Publications and conferences ==
2020

- "The irreversible cracks of the Berlin Biennale". [Online Source] OffTheBUS News Portal. 04 September 2020. Source EL PAIS
- Esclavages & Post-esclavages [En ligne], 2 | 2020, mis en ligne le 19 mai 2020, consulté le 08 juillet 2020.

2019

- Lidon, Charlotte. "À la recherche du temps passé: les artistes contemporains de la diaspora africaine et l'art traditionnel du continent". Facettes revue nº5. December 2019. Online source. https://issuu.com/50degresnord/docs/facette5pap

2018

- "Takes Two To Tango". Talk at the Student Conference of Art Education 23-25.11.2018, State Academy of Art and Design Stuttgart (Germany)

https://www.tagung-kunstpaedagogik.de

- "L’Offrande à Hessie", conference and dialogue in the context of the exhibition "Hessie: Œuvres restaurées", Galerie Arnaud Lefebvre, Paris (France).
- "New perspectives on the colonial legacy", Sixth Annual Conference on Cultural Politics of the Friedrich-Ebert-Stiftung, Berlin (Germany).
- Crenn, Julie. Writing of the biography of the artist Pélagie Gbaguidi at the platform AWARE Women Artists. © 2018, Archives of Women Artists, Research and Exhibitions.
- "La Biennale de Dakar : l'art contemporain à l'honneur". BBC News Afrique. May 2018.
- "DAK'ART 2018: La hora Roja (I)". RTVE. May 2018.

2017

- Forbes, Alexander. "15 Documenta Artists with Staying Power". Artsy. June 2017.
- Aubin, Charles. "What’s the Best Work of Art You Saw This Summer? 18 Well-Traveled Experts Weigh In". Artnet News. August 2017.
- "Installation View I documenta 14. Get a first impressions of the works on show at documenta 14 in Kassel". Contemporary And (C&). June 2017.
- Eirene. "Documenta 14 at the Athens Conservatoire". A Place Called Space (Blog). July 2017.
- Gorny, Moritz. "Lieblingskunstwerk "The Missing Link": Bedrohlich und voller Hoffnung". HNA. August 2017.
- Haidu, Rachel. "Documenta 14. From empire to the frog symphony: the exhibit’s 2017 edition splits itself across a fractured Europe." 4Columns. November 2017.
- Various authors. "What’s the Best Work of Art You Saw This Summer? 18 Well-Traveled Experts Weigh In". artnet News. August 2017.
- Beck, Christian. "documenta 14: my top 10 of modern art in 2017". Chris 'Bürger' Beck. August 2017. Online.

http://chrisbeck.de/documenta-14/

- Thorne, Harry. "documenta 14: Athens Conservatoire". Frieze. April 2017.
- Pigeat, Anaël. "ATHÈNES, DOCUMENTA". May 2017.
- Van Beek, Jozefien. "Kunst in tijden van crisis: artistieke hoogmis Documenta 14 opent in Kassel". DeMorgen. June 2017.
- Wilson-Goldie, Kaelen. "BEAUTIFUL STRANGERS". Artforum. June 2017.
- Crow, Kelly. "Where In-the-Know Art Collectors Are Heading". Wall Street Journal. June 2017.
- Wagner, Thomas. "When Elephants fight, it is the frogs that suffer". StylePark Magazine. June 2017.
- Dell, April. "documenta 14 // Confronting a Colonial Consciousness". Berlinartlink. June 2017.
- Stooke, Andrew. "Art Radar has a look at documenta 14 in Kassel". Artradar. July 2017. Online.

http://artradarjournal.com/2017/07/05/documenta-14-learning-from-athens-in-kassel-germany/

- Bonavoglia, Andrea. "documenta 14 a Kassel". Foglie e Parole d'Arte. July 2017.
- The Parliament of Bodies (Kassel): Black Athena Reloaded 2: A Trial of the Code Noir with Colin Dayan, Pélagie Gbaguidi, Tavia Nyong’o, David Scott, and Françoise Vergès. "Pélagie Gbaguidi, Le Code Noir: a forgotten piece of History" June 17, 2017 at 6pm.
- Forbes, Alexander. "15 Documenta Artists with Staying Power". Artsy Magazine. June 2017.
- “If you’re running from history, it will eventually catch up with you”, [interview] C& magazine (special documenta 14), No. 7, June 2017: 19-21. Print.
- Throne, Harry. "documenta 14: Athens Conservatoire". Frieze Magazine. April 2017.
- Lack, Jessica. Why Are We ‘Artists’? 100 World Art Manifestos. England: Penguin Modern Classics, 2017.

2016

- Dakar- Martiggny. Hommage à la Biennale d’art contemporain, Directeur de la publication: Mads Olesen (Martigny: ART-RAY éditions, 2016), pp. 71–73.

2015

- Griffiths, Claire. “Imaging the Present: An Iconography of Slavery in Contemporary African Art” in At the Limits of Memory: Legacies of Slavery in the Francophone World, edited by Nicola Frith & Kate Hodgson. Liverpool: Liverpool University Press, 2015, p. 209-228.;
- Mémorial ACTe. Direction: Thierry L’Étang. L’esclavage et la traite négrière dans la caraïbe et le monde. Guadeloupe: Mémorial Acte Éditions, 2015. pp. 150–151.

2014

- Njami, Simon. The Divine Comedy: Heaven, Hell, Purgatory Revisited by Contemporary African Artists. (Frankfurt: MMK Kerber, 2014). pp. 148–151.

2011

- Ancestral Space Translated Identities. ‘as it is!’ Contemporary African Art Exhibition Series. (Dubai: The Mojo Gallery, 2011), Exhibition Catalogue.

2009

- African Women, Edited by Ameziane Ferhani (Alger: National Museum of Modern and Contemporary Art of Alger, 2009), Exhibition Catalogue. pp. 31–33.;
- Gbaguidi, Pélagie. “The Black Code”, translation by Obi Okigbo and Zoé Whitley in Slavery in Art and Literature: Approaches to Trauma, Memory and Visuality, edited by Brigit Haehnel and Melanie Ulz © Frank& Time, 2009, pp. 111–124;
- Akinbode Akinbiyi und Barbara Barch. DAK’ART. Die 8. Biennale zeitgenössischer afrikanischer Kunst. Who am I? (Stuttgart: Institut für Auslandsbeziehungen Berlin, 2009), Katalog. pp. 34–37.

2008

- L’homme est un mystère 2. Expositions d’art contemporain d’Afrique, ODDCC Côtes d’Armor: Oct. Nov. Dec. 2005. p. 6.
- Dak'Art 2008. Afrique : Miroir ?, catalogue de la 8e Biennale de l'art africain contemporain, 2008. Catalog. pp. 102–103.;
- Dunja Hersak, Écouter et entendre : Pélagie Gbaguidi, Ola-Dele Kuku, Carlos Amorim Lemos, Toma Luntumbue, Hassan Musa, Otobong Nkanga, Aimé Ntakiyica, Mulugeta Tafesse, Galerie Kevin Conru, Bruxelles, 2008, p. 74.

2007

- Frauen Kunst Wissenschar: Körperfarben – Hautdiskurse, Halbjahreszeitschrift Juin, 2007, n° 43 pp. 83–87.;
- Uncomfortable Truths: the Shadow of Slave Trading on Contemporary Art and Design., V&A Museum. 2007, Catalog.

2006

- Dak’Art 2006, 7e Biennale de l’art africain contemporain, 2006, Catalogue. p. 188-189.;
- Annik Blavier. La visite est terminée, (Bruxelles : la trame, 2006), Catalogue de l’exposition.

2005

- The Imaginary Pelagie. Directed by Olga Baillif & Katy N'Diaye, Link Inter-Cultural Journal of Art and Literature, RTBF, 2005.
- Liaison, Revue Inter-culturelle d’Art et de Littérature. 2005, Nº25. pp. 36–41

2004

- Nouvelles impressions. Directeurs de la publication: Patricia Solini et Bevis Martin. (Nantes: Chiffoleau, 2004), Publication pour exposition et résidence. pp. 65–74.;
- Murphy, Maureen. “La biennale de Dakar au coeur des enjeux du marché de l’art en Afrique et en Occident.” Africa e Mediterraneo 47-48 Jan-Fev 2004: 48-53. Print.
- N. Paradoxa, International Feminist Art Journal. (Domestic Politics), Vol. 13, Jan.
- DAK’ART 2004. 6ème Biennale de l’Art Africain Contemporain, Edité par Sylviane Diop (Dakar, Sénegal : Biennale des Arts de Dakar, 2004), Catalogue de l’exposition. pp. 34–35.

2003

- Ves Rencontres de la photographie africaine: Rites sacrés/ Rites profanes. (Bamako: Rencontres de Bamako, 2003), Catalogue de l’exposition. pp. 52–53.

== Residencies ==
- 2018 - Civitella Ranieri Foundation Fellowship
- 2016 – NIROX Foundation, South Africa
- 2013 - Villa Waldberta Munich
- 2012 - IFITRY Morocco
- 2011 - Thamgidi FoundaXon, Netherlands
- 2007 - Factory, Krems, Austria
- 2004 - Lieu Unique, Nantes, France

== Collections ==
- L'Artothèque, île de la Réunion
- Illinois Holocaust Museum & Education Center, Chicago IL, USA
- Casa África, Las Palmas de Gran Canaria, Spain
- Memorial ACTe, Pointe-à-Pitre, Guadeloupe Islands
- Mu.ZEE, Ostende, Belgium
- Kanal - Centre Pompidou, Brussels, Belgium
- Private Collection, Zurich, Switzerland

== Videos ==
- El Mundo Sans le Corps
- The Missing Word
- Divine Comedy
