= Apostolos Georgiou =

Apostolos Georgiou (Thessaloniki, 1952) is a Greek visual artist of the generation of the 80s.

== Biography ==
He was born in 1952 in Thessaloniki where he grown up. He initially studied architecture at the University of Applied Arts in Vienna from 1971 to 1973, but switched to painting, studying at the Florence Academy of Art until 1975. Georgiou's career was marked by a late rise to fame, gaining significant recognition in his 60s. His work is characterized by an anthropocentric approach with geometric and bold lines. After completing his studies, he returned to Greece in 1980 and chose to live in Skopelos, while since 2006 he resides permanently in Athens.

Georgiou has held numerous solo exhibitions in galleries and events, mainly in Thessaloniki and Athens, at the Thessaloniki Port Authority (1993), the Macedonian Museum of Contemporary Art (2007) and the National Museum of Contemporary Art in Athens (2011). His participation in Documenta 14 in 2017, held in Greece, was a notable milestone in his career.

Anthropocentrism is mentioned as the main characteristic of Georgiou's painting. He has also been involved in teaching, contributing to academia in Greece. His works belong to museums, public, as well as private collections, demonstrating his influence and position in the contemporary art scene.
