= Theo Eshetu =

- Born: 1958 (age 67–68); London, England
- Education: University of East London
- Known for: Video art, filmmaking, photography

Theo Eshetu (born 1958) is a British-Ethiopian video artist and filmmaker known for video installations, experimental films, photography, and documentary work. His work frequently explores cultural identity, migration, anthropology, ritual, and the ways in which media and technology shape perception. Eshetu's work has been presented at international exhibitions including the Venice Biennale and documenta, and is held in the collections of institutions including the Museum of Modern Art, the Metropolitan Museum of Art, and the Smithsonian National Museum of African Art.

== Early life and education ==
Eshetu was born in London in 1958 to an Ethiopian father and a Dutch mother. He spent parts of his childhood in Ethiopia, Senegal, the Netherlands, Italy, and the former Yugoslavia as a result of his parents' work. His grandfather, Ethiopian historian and diplomat Tekle-Tsadik Mekouria, gave Eshetu an Instamatic camera during a trip to Pompeii when Eshetu was ten. This contributed to his early interest in photography.

During the 1970s, Eshetu worked as a photographer and encountered artists and musicians including Andy Warhol, the Velvet Underground, and David Bowie. He graduated from North East London Polytechnic with a degree in communication design in 1981. In 1982, he relocated to Rome and began concentrating on media and video art.

== Career ==
Eshetu began working with video in the early 1980s, using the medium to examine his multicultural background and the relationship between television, representation, and personal identity. One of his early installations, Till Death Us Do Part, developed between 1982 and 1987, uses multiple television monitors, video, masks, lights, and a pew. The work was later acquired by the Museum of Modern Art in New York City.

In 1993, Eshetu received first prize at the Berlin Video Festival for Travelling Light, an experimental documentary about dancer and mime artist Lindsay Kemp. His 1999 video installation Brave New World II combined footage including Ethiopian religious ceremonies, Balinese dancers, advertising, and other imagery inside a mirrored structure that reflected both the images and the viewer. The work entered the collection of the Smithsonian National Museum of African Art.

Eshetu's The Return of the Axum Obelisk shows the dismantling in Rome and return to Ethiopia of the ancient Obelisk of Axum, which had been taken to Italy during the Italian occupation of Ethiopia. The work combines footage of the monument's repatriation with imagery relating to the Queen of Sheba and the Ethiopian Kebra Nagast. A version of the work was later acquired by the Metropolitan Museum of Art.

In 2011, Eshetu participated in the 54th Venice Biennale. He was a fellow of the DAAD Artists-in-Berlin Program in 2012, where his video installations were described as combining the formal language of moving images with subjects drawn from anthropology, ritual, symbolism, and myth.

Eshetu presented Atlas Fractured at documenta 14 in Athens and Kassel in 2017. The work developed from footage Eshetu recorded at Ethnological Museum of Berlin and incorporated projected images and portraits in an examination of cultural representation and the museum. In 2019, his work was included in Migrating Worlds: The Art of the Moving Image in Britain at the Yale Center for British Art, an exhibition focused on film and video artists addressing migration, place, identity, and displacement.

In 2026, Eshetu participated in the central exhibition In Minor Keys at the 61st Venice Biennale with Garden of the Broken Hearted, an installation consisting of an olive tree on a rotating stage onto which video of the tree is projected. The installation addressed displacement, loss, memory, and the relationship between the physical object and its mediated image.

== Selected works ==
Eshetu's works include Till Death Us Do Part (1982–1987), Travelling Light (1992), Brave New World II (1999), The Return of the Axum Obelisk (2009), The Slave Ship (2015), Atlas Fractured (2017), and Garden of the Broken Hearted (2026).
