= Akinbode Akinbiyi =

British-Nigerian photographer, author and curator

Akinbode Akinbiyi (born 1946 in Oxford, England) is a British photographer, author and curator of Nigerian background, who has been living in Berlin, Germany, since the 1990s. Due to his participation in exhibitions, festivals, publications and networks, he has become known as one of the internationally renowned representatives of photography in Africa.

== Life and career ==
Akinbiyi grew up in England, where his parents had moved for university studies, and in Lagos, Nigeria. He studied English literature in Ibadan, Lancaster and Heidelberg.

In 1972, he began as a self-taught photographer. Over time, Akinbiyi became one of the internationally recognized photographers of African origin. His main focus is on the rapidly growing and changing megacities of the African continent, such as Lagos, Kinshasa, Cairo, Dakar and Johannesburg. In doing so, he concentrates on the unspectacular everyday life of people, seemingly without subjective interpretation of the objects of his pictures.

Working mainly with an analogue Rolleiflex medium format camera, Akinbiyi's personal style of street photography was described by art curator Bonaventure Soh Bejeng Ndikung:

"Akinbiyi studies social structures, uncovers the hidden, and makes visible the unseen. On the one hand, it is the temporal rhythm of urban and rural lives that is of interest to him and, on the other, the way the architecture and the flow of the city influences those lives."

As author, Akinbiyi has written texts for exhibition catalogues and for the book "Just Ask!" on contemporary African photography, edited by curator Simon Njami. In cooperation with the Goethe-Institut, the German cultural institute in Nigeria, he founded an art centre, which has since developed into a network of African photography schools. Together with Gisela Kayser, he curated the photography exhibitions "Things Fall Apart - Film Stills by Stephen Goldblatt" and "The Respectful Gaze - From the Estate of Nina Fischer-Stephan," which were presented in Lagos, Kampala, Mexico City, Accra, Abidjan and Atlanta. The short documentary Nina Fischer-Stephan's Respectful Gaze by Mallam Mudi Yahaya, who has also written extensive captions for exhibited photographs, explored the nexus of photography, architecture, and urban development, delving into the cultural and political implications of colonial and post-independence images of Africa. The film celebrated its world premiere in 2024 at the African Film Festival in New York.

Akinbiyi's work has been shown at exhibitions and biennials in Frankfurt, Berlin, Dresden, Tokyo, Paris, Philadelphia, Johannesburg and Havana, and has been published in various magazines. In addition, he acted as exhibition curator for the German Institute for Foreign Cultural Relations, including "STADTanSICHTEN Lagos" (2004) and "Spot on... DAK'ART – The 8th Biennial of Contemporary African Art" (2009). For the African Photography Encounters in Mali, he curated the German contribution in 2003. As part of documenta 14 art exhibition in 2017, he exhibited his work titled Passageways, Involuntary Narratives, and the Sound of Crowded Spaces (2015–2017) in Athens, Greece, and Kassel, Germany. In connection with the New Photography 2023 exhibition at the Museum of Modern Art (MOMA), Akinbiyi hosted a so-called "Photo-Wander" (a pun on wonder and wander) in Harlem, where he applied his method of strolling around the city.

Akinbiyi has lived in Berlin since the early 1990s, where he has also exhibited his photographs of the African community and the city's colonial history, and has frequently returned to cities in Africa.

== Main exhibitions ==
- Tales from a Globalizing World (2003–2007) in Brussels, Dhaka, Geneva, Cairo and other locations
- Africa Remix (2004–2007) in Düsseldorf, London, Paris, Tokyo, Stockholm and Johannesburg
- Sea never dry (2005) at the Staatliche Museum für Völkerkunde in Dresden, Germany
- Adama in Wonderland (2013–14), Goethe-Institut Johannesburg
- Three Photographers/Six Cities (2016), Philadelphia Museum of Art).

== Publications as co-author ==
- Kouoh, Koyo (ed.) Lucid Knowledge. Fotografie als Währung – Zu Aktualität, Relevanz und Verbreitung von Bildern. (2022). Berlin: Hatje Cantz Verlag, ISBN 9783775753098 (in German).
- Njami Simon, Sean O'Toole, Akinbode Akinbiyi, Lucienne Bestall, Nicola Brandt, Frédérique Chapuis, John Fleetwood et al. (2019) The Journey. New Positions in African Photography. Bielefeld: Kerber Verlag. ISBN 978-3-73560-682-2.
- Njami, Simon, ed. (2014). Just Ask!. Bielefeld: Kerber Verlag. ISBN 978-3-86678-984-5.

== Awards and recognitions ==
- Goethe Medal, 2016
- Order of Merit of the Federal Republic of Germany, 2021
- Hanna-Höch-Prize of the Berlin Senate, 2024
