= Gerhard Lang (artist) =

Gerhard Lang (born 1963 in Jugenheim an der Bergstraße, Germany) is a German visual artist and performance artist.

== Life and work ==
Gerhard Lang studied at the University of Kassel from 1985 to 1992, where he took classes in graphic design and illustration with Hans Hillmann and Gunter Rambow, experimental photography with Floris M. Neusüss, and strollology with Lucius Burckhardt. He moved to University College London in 1994 and completed his MA at the Slade School of Fine Art in 1996 under Stuart Brisley and Stephen Bann.

Lang was invited to documenta 14 in 2017, where his contribution Transitus was based on a walk he had conducted with Annemarie and Lucius Burckhardt and students of the University of Kassel in 1993. His work has been included in international group exhibitions at the Hayward Gallery in London (Spectacular Bodies, 2000), where he was one of eight contemporary artists shown alongside Bill Viola, Tony Oursler, Marc Quinn and Christine Borland; the 46th Venice Biennale (1995); MoMA PS1 in New York; the Canadian Centre for Architecture in Montreal, where his Mobile Zebra Crossing was shown as part of Actions: What You Can Do With the City (2008); the Frankfurter Kunstverein (Vereinzelt Schauer, 2013); the Museum Sinclair-Haus in Bad Homburg; the Wende Museum in Los Angeles; and the Kunstmuseum Ravensburg, where his work was shown alongside Francis Alÿs, Adrian Piper and Pipilotti Rist in Walk This Way (2024–25).

Lang's work deals with landscape, perception and drawing. Rather than treating landscape as a given natural space, he approaches it as a cultural phenomenon shaped by habits of seeing. A characteristic element of his practice is the link between bodily experience — particularly walking — and the act of drawing; in series such as the Cloud Walks (1993 onwards) and the long-running Visus Signatus drawings he records clouds and other atmospheric phenomena while looking at the sky rather than at the paper. For the project Nubi Tempora (2017) Lang worked from the roof of the German Weather Service (Deutscher Wetterdienst) in Offenbach, pairing his hand-drawn cloud observations with raw meteorological data collected in the building below.

He lives and works in Schloss-Nauses (Otzberg) and London.

== Selected exhibitions ==
- 2024–2025: Walk This Way, Kunstmuseum Ravensburg
- 2024: Counter/Surveillance, Wende Museum, Los Angeles
- 2024: Radical Matter, University of Applied Arts Vienna
- 2023: Clouds. From Gerhard Richter to the Cloud, Stiftung Kunst und Natur, Museum Sinclair-Haus, Bad Homburg
- 2022: Street Life, Wilhelm-Hack-Museum, Ludwigshafen
- 2020: Living the City, Tempelhof Airport, Berlin
- 2020: Intermedia – Mong Kok, Creative Art Center (Baptist University), Hong Kong
- 2018: Dialogues with a Collection, Laure Genillard Gallery, London
- 2018: Simulacra ex speculis, MuseumsQuartier, Vienna
- 2017: Transitus, documenta Halle, documenta 14, Kassel
- 2017: Wie entdecken Entdecker, Unpacking Burckhardt programme, documenta 14, Kassel
- 2017: Unheimlich schön. Stillleben heute, Museum of Modern Art Carinthia (MMKK), Klagenfurt
- 2017: Nubi Tempora. Wolkenlandschaften, Deutscher Wetterdienst, Offenbach am Main
- 2013: X Architecture Biennale, São Paulo
- 2013: U. F. O., Museum of Site (MOST), Hong Kong
- 2013: Vereinzelt Schauer – Formen von Wetter, Frankfurter Kunstverein
- 2011: Science & Fiction, Kunstmuseum Solothurn
- 2010: Actions: What You Can Do With the City, Graham Foundation, Chicago
- 2008: Actions: What You Can Do With the City, Canadian Centre for Architecture, Montreal
- 2007: Say it isn't so, Neues Museum Weserburg, Bremen
- 2005: Future Face, National Museum of Science and Technology, Taiwan
- 2003: Head On, Science Museum, London
- 2002: Das zweite Gesicht, Deutsches Museum, Munich
- 2001: Phantom-Bilder, Staatliche Museen/Neue Galerie, Kassel
- 2000: Spectacular Bodies, Hayward Gallery, London
- 2000: Transact 2000, museum in progress, Vienna
- 1998: Natural Science, Stills Gallery, Edinburgh
- 1997: Heaven, PS1, New York
- 1997: Art / Science, Demarco Gallery, Edinburgh
- 1996: Happy End, Kunsthalle Düsseldorf
- 1995: Identità e Alterità, Venice Biennale
- 1993: Palaeanthropische Physiognomie, Senckenberg Natural History Museum, Frankfurt
- 1989: Auf der Suche nach Schlemhils Schatten, Fridericianum, Kassel
- 1989: 3rd International Photo Manifestation for the 150th Anniversary of Photography, Nieuwe Kerk, Amsterdam

== Select awards and fellowships ==
- 2018: Artist in Residence, MuseumsQuartier, Vienna
- 2017: Fellowship, Hessian Ministry of Science and the Arts
- 2012–2013: New York City studio fellowship, Hessische Kulturstiftung, Wiesbaden
- 2010–2011: Research fellowship, Lucius and Annemarie Burckhardt Foundation, Basel
- 2009: Fellowship, Stiftung Kunstfonds, Bonn
- 2004–2007: Sciart Award, Wellcome Trust, London
- 1999–2000: Fellowship, Calouste Gulbenkian Foundation, London
- 1998: Exhibition grant, ifa (Institut für Auslandsbeziehungen), Stuttgart
- 1996: Julian Sullivan Award, Slade School of Fine Art
- 1989: Photo Award '89, 3rd International Photo Manifestation, Amsterdam

== Selected publications ==
- Counter/Surveillance. Ed. Marieke Drost and Joes Segal. Wende Museum, Culver City 2024, ISBN 979-8-218-41844-1.
- Street Life. Ed. Astrid Ihle and René Zechlin. Hirmer Verlag, Munich 2022, ISBN 978-3-7774-3697-5.
- Living the City. Ed. Lukas Feireiss, Tatjana Schneider, TheGreenEyl. Spector Books, Leipzig 2020, ISBN 978-3-959-05408-9.
- Transitus. In: aneducation – documenta 14. Archive Books, Berlin 2018, ISBN 978-3-943620-80-1.
- Nubi Tempora. Wolkenlandschaften. Deutscher Wetterdienst, Offenbach am Main 2017, ISBN 978-3-88148-498-5.
- Unheimlich schön. Stillleben heute. Ed. Christine Wetzlinger-Grundnig. MMKK, Klagenfurt 2017, ISBN 978-3-9503572-6-4.
- Lexikon der Raumphilosophie. Ed. Stephan Günzel. WBG, Darmstadt 2012, ISBN 978-3-534-21931-5.
- Art and Fear in the Contemporary World. By Caterina Albano. Reaktion Books, London 2012, ISBN 978-1-78023-019-1.
- Science & Fiction. Ed. Barbara von Flüe. edition Fink, Zurich 2011, ISBN 978-3-03746-146-4.
- TransAct. Ed. Cathrin Pichler and Roman Berka. Springer Vienna/New York 2010, ISBN 978-3-211-99800-7.
- Actions. What You Can Do With the City. Ed. Giovanni Borasi and Mirko Zardini. CCA/SUN, 2008.
- Ways Around Modernism. By Stephen Bann. Routledge, London/New York 2007, ISBN 978-0-415-97421-9.
- Say it isn't so. Ed. Peter Friese et al. Neues Museum Weserburg, Bremen 2007, ISBN 978-3-939583-30-1.
- Kunst nach der Wissenschaft. By Susanne Witzgall. Verlag für Moderne Kunst, Nuremberg 2004, ISBN 978-3-936711-15-8.
- The Molecular Gaze. Ed. Suzanne Anker and Dorothy Nelkin. Cold Spring Harbor Laboratory Press, New York 2004, ISBN 978-0-87969-697-9.
- Luft. Schriftenreihe Forum, vol. 12. Wienand Verlag, Cologne 2003, ISBN 978-3-87909-817-0.
- Das zweite Gesicht. Ed. Cornelia Kemp and Susanne Witzgall. Prestel, Munich 2002, ISBN 3-7913-2648-1.
- Spectacular Bodies. By Martin Kemp and Marina Wallace. University of California Press, 2000, ISBN 978-0-520-22792-7.
- Happy End. Ed. Marie Luise Syring. Kunsthalle Düsseldorf / Wienand Verlag, Cologne 1996.
- Identità e Alterità. Figure del Corpo 1895/1995. Ed. Manlio Brusatin and Jean Clair. Venice Biennale 1995, ISBN 978-88-208-0390-2.
- Lucius Burckhardt. Design ist unsichtbar. Ed. Hans Höger. Cantz Verlag, Ostfildern 1995, ISBN 3-89322-765-2.
- Palaeanthropische Physiognomie. Ed. Gerhard Lang. Deutsche Fototage, Frankfurt am Main 1993, ISBN 3-930054-08-6.
