= Beatriz González =

Colombian artist (1932–2026)

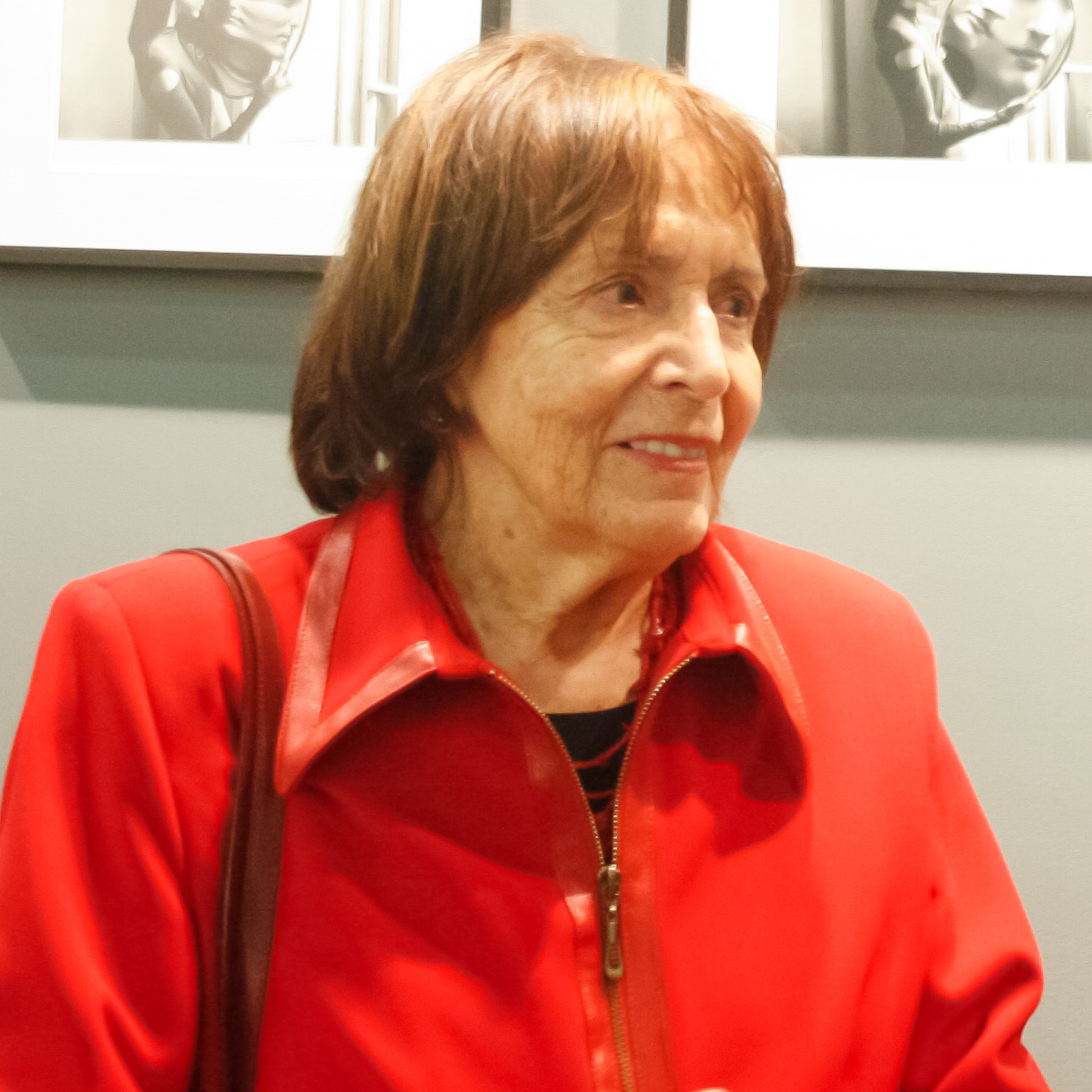
- Gonzalez in 2015
- Born: 16 November 1932; Bucaramanga, Santander Department, Colombia
- Died: 9 January 2026 (aged 93); Bogotá, Colombia
- Education: University of Los Andes; Rijksakademie van beeldende kunsten
- Notable work: The Suicides of Sisga I, II and III, La Última Mesa, Nací en Florencia
- Movement: Pop art
- Occupations: Sculptor; painter; engraver; art historian; art critic; museum curator

Beatriz González (16 November 1932 – 9 January 2026) was a Colombian painter, sculptor, critic, curator, and art historian. González was often associated with the pop art movement. She was best known for her bright and colorful paintings depicting life in Colombia during the war-torn period known as La Violencia.

== Background ==
Beatriz González was born in Bucaramanga on 16 November 1932. She was the youngest daughter of Valentín González Rangel and Clementina Aranda Mantilla. In the late 1950s, she enrolled in architecture school, but she dropped out only a few years later. She returned to Bucaramanga in 1958. González ended up enrolling in University of Los Andes and graduated from their fine arts department in 1962. While there, she was a student of Argentine art critic and historian Marta Traba and Spanish painter Joan Antonio Roda.

She grew up in Colombia during the 1940s and 1950s, while the country was plagued with violence and war due to the social and political upheaval known as La Violencia. Growing up during this time largely influenced González's understanding of Colombian society, and eventually even her artistic style.

González died on 9 January 2026, at the age of 93.

== Career ==
Although González is often referred to as an artist of the pop art movement, she never considered herself a pop artist. She often thought that the pop movement was not present in her preferred medium of painting and that it would not be an appropriate label for the work she was doing. When asked if she had at any point considered herself a pop artist she responded with, "I've always considered myself more of a painter and within this remit I painted the joy of the underdeveloped. For me the type of art that I was doing could only circulate internationally as a curiosity. Mine was a provincial type of art without horizons, confronting the everyday: art is international."

She was often acknowledged for being a woman in a movement and country where a great deal of her peers were men. According to González, this was never a problem for her and she credited Marta Traba for encouraging the presence of women in the Colombian art scene and stated that she didn't believe in the complex of the female artist who must be victimized.

In 1965 González created a painting entitled The Suicides of Sisga, which was based on a picture of a young couple that had been published in a local newspaper after they jumped off the dam of the river Sisga in order to preserve the purity of their love. This work was initially refused at the 1965 Salon of Colombian Artists, disregarded and brushed off by the Jury as a "bad Botero". After one of González's friends and mentors, Marta Traba pressed the Jury to reconsider their decision, the painting was not only accepted, but González won a special prize for her work, which eventually helped launch her career.

After accompanying her husband who is an architect to a hardware store in the 1970s, she began her work on various pieces of store-bought furniture that would generally be found in middle-class households earlier in the century. Typically she would take her images from well known Italian Renaissance and history paintings, or pictures from the present day news media, transferring these images onto cheap nightstands, chairs, coffee tables, and beds painted by an amateur painter. She carefully coordinated her images with the furniture's function, such as painting the pope's face on nightstands, conjuring up devotional images commonly found over beds or on nightstands in the average Colombian household.

In 1985 González's work took a dramatic stylistic shift from its vibrant colors and shapes, to more dark imagery. This was after the M-19 guerrilla attack on the Palace of Justice in an attempt to put the President of Colombia on trial. They left 94 dead. Feeling that she could not laugh after that event, she began to explore themes of death and the drug trade as well as exploring some of Colombia's most tragic events.

When she painted three Colombian presidents (Julio César Turbay Ayala, Carlos Lleras Restrepo, and Belisario Betancur) wearing Native Amazonian headdresses next to a Native Amazonian, many interpreted it as a portrayal of their inefficiency as presidents.

In 2019, the Pérez Art Museum Miami presented the first career retrospective of González's work in the United States. Titled Beatriz González: A Retrospective, the solo exhibition spanned six decades of González's artistic practice, presenting nearly 150 artworks from the 1960s to the present time that commented on Postwar artistic movements such as pop art and Latin American feminism.

In 2023, González took part in BIENALSUR (International Biennial of Contemporary Art of the South), participating in the group exhibition Interferencias intersticiales, held at the Centre Pompidou Málaga in Spain.

== Individual artworks ==
=== The Suicides of Sisga I, II and III ===
One of González's most well known and earliest works depicts a young couple standing holding hands with one other and a bouquet of flowers with a slight smile on their faces. This painting was based on a photo that originally appeared in the press of a couple who commissioned a professional photographer to take their portrait before jumping off the dam of the Sisga on the outskirts of Bogotá. The couple were two young farmers who were deeply in love, but in an effort to preserve the purity of their love, the man (who was suspected to be mentally insane) convinced his girlfriend to commit suicide as a way to show their religious devotion in not wanting to sully the woman's purity. The picture was sent to their families, and when the news broke it was widely reprinted in black and white in the local newspapers. González claimed that she was attracted to this picture due to its "bad quality" or more so its plain quality, the simplification of the facial features that were almost deformed by the discrepancy. This painting was the first of a number of paintings done by González in the 1960s in which she explored the intense violence in Colombia. During this time she produced a series of ink drawings on the same theme, that were tabloid photos of crimes of passion and political murders as well as advertisements for everything from bodybuilding to headache cures.

=== La última mesa (The Last Table) ===
This work was one of González's first furniture pieces out of her series of furniture works. It consisted of Leonardo da Vinci's Last Supper work that had been repainted onto metal sheets that were then mounted on a faux-wood dining table. González intentionally chose this particular work by Leonardo because of its popularity in Colombian culture, this image was commonly placed above the main entrance door as a good-luck charm against thieves. This work along with many of the others out of her furniture works had the intention of being a "representation of representations" not only through an effort to make universal art, but also to subvert the original function of the furniture itself. In this case, she intentionally took all of the shadows and duller colors that made this work more European, and animated it more in hopes of making it more uniquely Latin American.

=== Nací en Florencia (I was born in Florence) ===
The full title of this work is Nací en Florencia y tenía 26 años cuando fue pintado mi retrato (esta frase pronunciada en una voz dulce y baja), translated to I was born in Florence and was 26 years old when my portrait was painted (this sentence pronounced in a low, sweet voice). In this work, González placed her own painting of Leonardo da Vinci's Mona Lisa where the mirror would be on a very large and elaborate antique coat rack. She used the location of the would be mirror to frame her work so when the viewers look at the work they see an image of beauty recreated in a cheap, reproduced style. The long title of the work is in an additional effort to reveal its humorous and a potentially slightly erotic intent.

=== Canción de cuna (Lullaby) ===
This work consisted of an image of a mother holding her child that was based on a picture that was widely printed and distributed by a printing company in Colombia. The painting was painted on a sheet of metal that was then mounted on the inside of a crib that González found in the streets of Bogóta that originally belonged to a hospital. The theme of mother and child was one that commonly occurred in her artwork thus turning González herself into an image of maternity.

== Exhibitions ==
- Transmissions: Art in Eastern Europe and Latin America, Museum of Modern Art, New York (1960–1980)
- What an Honor to Be With You at This Historic Moment, Works, El Museo del Barrio (1965–1997, 1998)
- I Am Still Alive: Everyday Life in Contemporary Drawing, Museum of Modern Art, New York (23 March – 19 September 2011)
- documenta 14, Athens, Greece and Kassel, Germany (2017)
- Beatriz González: A Retrospective, Pérez Art Museum Miami (2019)
- Poetics of Gesture: War and Peace at the Museo Universitario Arte Contemporáneo (2023–2024)
- Beatriz González: The Image in Transit, Pinacoteca do Estado de São Paulo (2025–2026)
- Beatriz González: Retrospective, Barbican Centre (2026)

== Collections ==
- Pérez Art Museum Miami
- Tate Americas Foundation
- Museum of Modern Art, New York
- De Pont Museum, Tilburg
