= Aboubakar Fofana =

Malian artist and indigo dyer (born 1967)

- Born: 1967 (age 58–59); Bamako, Mali
- Education: Calligraphy, graphic design
- Known for: Indigo dyeing, textile art, installation art
- Notable work: Ka touba Farafina yé (Africa Blessing) (2017); Fundi (Uprising) (2017)

Aboubakar Fofana (born 1967) is a Malian contemporary artist, textile designer, calligrapher, and master indigo dyer. His artistic practice is rooted in the revival and reinterpretation of traditional West African natural dyeing techniques—particularly fermented indigo vats—and often engages with themes of cultural heritage, ecology, spirituality, and the legacy of colonialism in Africa. Fofana’s work has been exhibited internationally, including at the major contemporary art exhibition documenta 14 in Athens and Kassel in 2017.

== Early life and education ==
Aboubakar Fofana was born in Bamako, Mali, in 1967, and moved with his family to the Paris region during his childhood. In Paris, he trained in calligraphy and graphic design, studying Western and Eastern script traditions. This early interest in written forms informed his later artistic research and contributed to his engagement with African systems of knowledge beyond oral transmission.

During his formative years, Fofana developed a strong interest in traditional indigo dyeing, a craft historically widespread in West Africa but increasingly endangered due to industrial dyes and changing economic conditions. He undertook extended research trips throughout Mali and neighboring countries, documenting techniques and learning from remaining practitioners of fermented indigo vats.

== Artistic practice ==
Fofana’s work bridges craft, fine art, and cultural preservation. His practice centers on natural indigo dyeing using fermented vats made from plant leaves, which function as living ecosystems in which bacteria reduce the indigo pigment to a soluble form capable of bonding with textiles. The full process—from cultivating indigo plants to weaving, fermenting, and dyeing—can take several months and reflects both ecological knowledge and spiritual engagement with materials.

In addition to indigo, Fofana works with organic cotton, mineral mud dyes, and other natural materials. His works often explore contrasts such as tradition and modernity, materiality and spirituality, and continuity and rupture in African cultural histories.

== Major works and exhibitions ==
In 2017, Fofana participated in documenta 14, held in Athens and Kassel. In Athens, he presented Ka touba Farafina yé (Africa Blessing), a large-scale project involving fifty-four live lambs, each symbolically representing one African country. The animals’ wool was dyed using natural indigo in collaboration with the Agricultural University of Athens, emphasizing relationships between humans, animals, and ecological systems.

In Kassel, Fofana presented Fundi (Uprising), an installation composed of hand-dyed indigo textiles produced in Bamako and Athens. The work referenced historical struggles associated with indigo cultivation and the colonial exploitation of labor and resources.

== Themes and influence ==
Fofana’s practice engages with cultural memory, environmental sustainability, and the lasting effects of colonial economic systems. By reviving traditional indigo fermentation techniques, his work challenges industrial models of production and highlights alternative forms of knowledge transmission rooted in ecology and community.

His work has been discussed in art and design publications as an example of how contemporary African artists integrate ancestral practices into global contemporary art, making visible forms of knowledge historically marginalized in Western-centered narratives.
