= Zef Shoshi =

Albanian painter

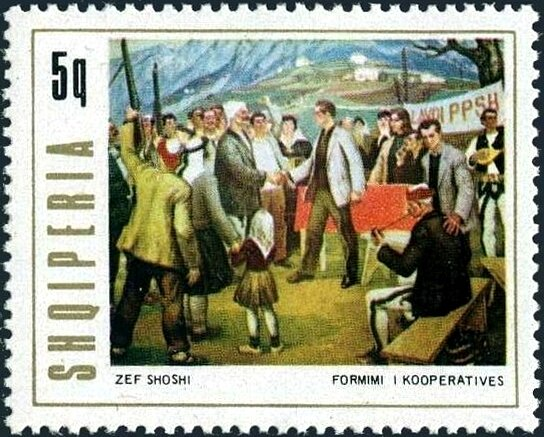
Cooperation 1974 by Zef Shoshi

Zef Pashko Shoshi (born 1939) is an Albanian painter, painting in socialist realism. Shoshi is considered a national art treasure in Albania.

== Biography ==
Shoshi was born in Tirana, Albania, in 1939, the son of a bank clerk and amateur painter. His earliest drawings depicted ships on the horizon during a stay in Ulcinj in 1943 or 1944.

Between 1957 and 1961, Shoshi studied at the Ilya Repin Institution in Leningrad, Russia, during which time he studied under Boris Ioganson, and was a contemporary of artist Sali Shijaku and sculptor Vilson Kilica. Shoshi later graduated from the Tirana Institute of Arts.

Shoshi's talent and technique was recognised in Albanian art circles. His paintings reflected communist themes, such as the working class in fields and factories. He particularly documented life in the Zadrima region, reflecting its traditional and cultural heritage in daily life. His style pays particular attention to the human figure and face, lending Shoshi to be best known for his portraits. In 1974, Shoshi was commissioned to paint Enver Hoxha, Albania's dictator. After the fall of communism, Shoshi's works attracted the attention of international collectors, particularly in the United States.
