= Krzysztof Niemczyk =

Krzysztof Niemczyk (21 May 1938 – 19 January 1994) was a Polish writer, painter, performer, and situationist. He lived in Kraków. He collaborated with Tadeusz Kantor and Galeria Krzysztofory, and became a prominent figure in Krakow's artistic life in the 1960s and 1970s. He was the nephew of Leon Niemczyk.

== Early life ==
Krzysztof Niemczyk was born in 1938 to violinist Wacław Niemczyk and Danuta (née von Schenk). After the Warsaw Uprising, his family moved to Kraków, Poland, where Niemczyk lived and worked for the rest of his life. In 1946, his father crossed the green border to London and abandoned his family.

In 1950, Niemczyk contracted meningitis. He was cured later following treatment.

Niemczyk began writing stories in the 1960s. Out of the roughly 20 stories that he wrote the two most prominent are: "Tragiczna łąka" (Tragic Meadow) and "Chłopczyk rozbijający rodzinę" (Boy Breaking The Family). From 1965 through 1968, he worked on his novel Kurtyzana i pisklęta, czyli Krzywe zwierciadło namiętnego działania albo inaczej Studium chaosu (Courtesan and Chicks, or a Crooked Mirror of Passionate Action or Study of the Chaos).

Later in the 1960s, Niemczyk got involved with the artistic environment of Tadeusz Kantor's Cricot 2 theater, the Krzysztofory Gallery in Krakow and the Foksal Gallery in Warsaw (although he made friends with its founder, critic Anka Ptaszkowska, he never did exhibit there). He was a member of the Kraków hippie community and entered a relationship with a fellow member, Jacek Gulla.

Cooperation with Kantor's theater ended after the success of My nie śpimy (We Are Not Sleeping). Niemczyk, Kantor, and Tomasz Wawak all claimed authorship, which led to a quarrel and artistic split that launched Niemczyk's fall into obscurity.

In 1968, the Służba Bezpieczeństwa (SB) offered to collaborate with him and recruited him as a secret collaborator. However, Niemczyk did not keep their collaboration a secret. During militia raids, he referred to contacts with Major Olszówka, called "his" officer so that the militia would bring his partner, and did not report anyone. Due to these activities, his "collaboration" with the SB was considered one of Niemczyk's performances.

In 1971, Niemczyk was arrested and committed to a psychiatric hospital. In 1992, he was hospitalized in Paris with serious diabetic complications. He died alone two years later in a hospital in Krakow.

== Performances ==
In Kraków's artistic world, Niemczyk was known for his eccentric lifestyle and provocative actions. Although in the 1960s the activities of street artists gained the status of legal happenings, Niemczyk did not employ this protection. As Ptaszkowska said, "[Niemczyk] exploded the frames of art, just as he boldly strained the limits of life."

In 1969, Niemczyk took part in the Złote Grono symposium in Zielona Góra, as part of the exhibition Critics present Artists. At the invitation of Anka Ptaszkowska, he participated in the performance of Tadeusz Kantor's students under the title My nie śpimy (We are not sleeping). In the exhibition hall, some artists lay on camp beds with the title slogan in the background, and some artists (including Niemczyk) were a "permanent jury". Niemczyk also came up with banners for performances, such as "Only sleep guarantees impunity" and "We demand control".

Participants in this performance were invited by Pierre Restany to participate in the exhibition Art Concepts from Europe at the Bonino Gallery in New York. Niemczyk responded to the invitation by sending a "funny and really insignificant telegram" (Ptaszkowska).

== Works ==
- Kurtyzana i pisklęta, czyli Krzywe zwierciadło namiętnego działania albo inaczej Studium chaosu, Ha!art, Kraków 2007, ISBN 978-83-89911-42-1
- French edition: La courtisane et les poussins, tr. Jacques Burko, La Différence, Paris 1999, ISBN 2729112413

== Bibliography ==
- Anna Ptaszkowska (red.) Traktat o życiu Krzysztofa Niemczyka na użytek młodych pokoleń esej w "Kurtyzana i pisklęta..., Ha!art, Kraków 2007, ISBN 978-83-89911-42-1
