= Bili Bidjocka =

Cameroonian artist

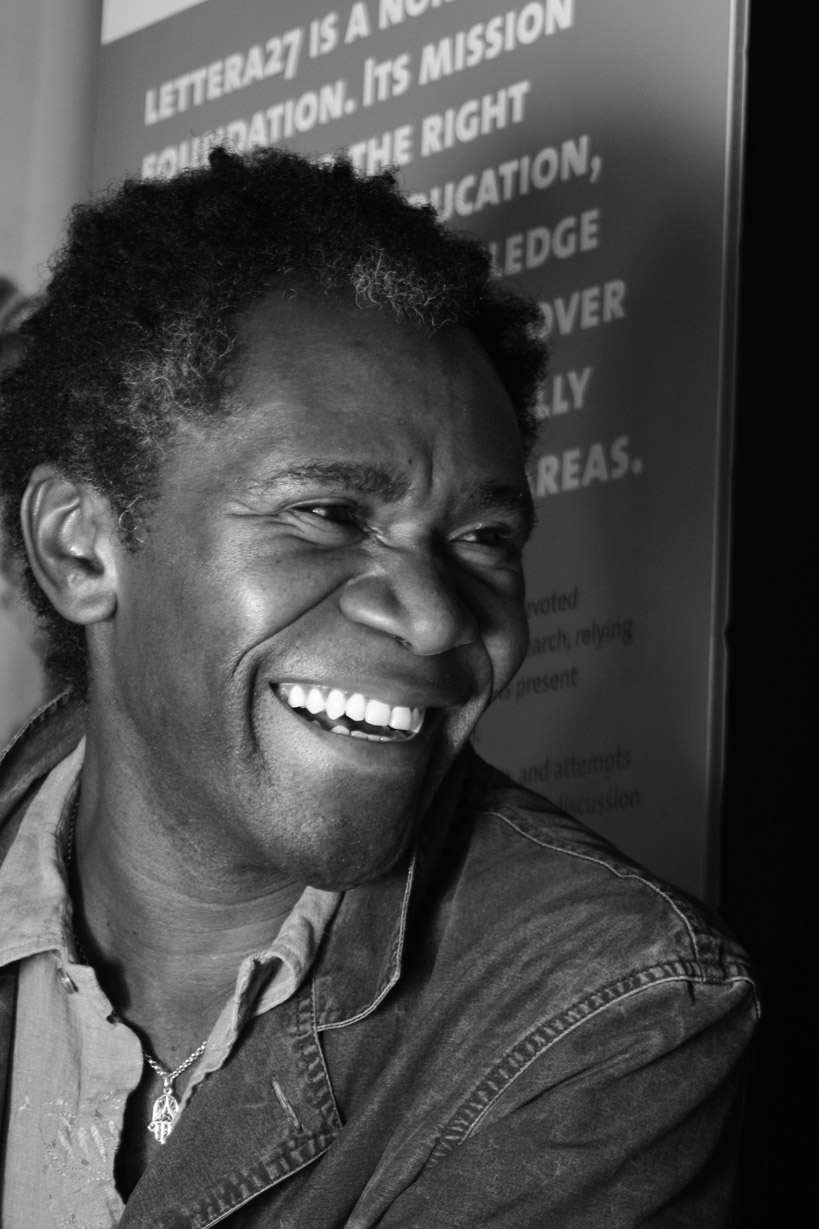
- Bili Bidjocka at the Mantua Literature Festival
- Born: Douala, Cameroon
- Known for: Sculpture Plastic arts
- Notable work: L'écriture infinie

Bili Bidjocka is a contemporary Cameroonian artist best known for his installations and sculptures. He was born in Douala, Cameroon, lives in France since the age of 12, and works in Paris, Brussels and New York City.

== Biography ==
In 1975, Bidjocka and his family move to Paris where he studied at the Ecole Nationale Supérieure des Beaux Arts. In 1985, he is co-founder of the Parisian underground association Les Frigos, aiming to support creative talent. Starting in 1994, as an artist and as a curator, he works on several cultural projects and in 1995 he co-founded and directed the contemporary Art Center the Matrix Art Project in New York, a platform of production and experimentation. Between 1998 and 2007, he supervises the Matrix Art Project contemporary art center in Brussels, where he lives in those years. In 2007, Bidjocka moves back to Paris.

Bili Bidjocka's works consist of art installations, sculptures and conceptual projects. After a period of painting, he realizes installations adopting writing as an integral part of his work. His work acts like a puzzle, a riddle that gives the artist the answers he needs about the sense of his art. Cameroonian processions and ceremonies characterize his work, adopting metaphors to make the artist think about loss and absence, on the one hand, and about ecstasy and suspended desire, on the other.

Bili Bidjocka has attended numerous collectives and he has shown in the Biennale of Johannesburg (1997), Havana (1997), Biennale Dakar (2000), Taipei (2004) and Venice Biennale (inside Check List - Luanda Pop, 2007 curated by Fernando Alvim and Simon Njami); he has exhibited his works in the New Museum of Contemporary Art of New York City and in the exposition Africa Remix (Düsseldorf, London, Paris, Tokyo, Johannesburg, 2005–2007).

== Works ==
=== L'écriture infinie ===
L'écriture infinie is a work of Bili Bidjocka. It aims to write the biggest collection of handwritten books in the world because the new technologies cause the progressive extinction and replace handwritten writing. It consists of a series of books with 6000 white pages, 104cm long and 100kg. The artist declares that the public is invited to write - as it was the last thing to do before the cut of a hand. On a wall nearby, an overhead view of the book is being projected in real-time. The founder act is the writing act in itself and not the reading after. Each book, once done, is packed into a linen material. The idea is that these books will be opened in a day where writing will not exist anymore. There are now existing 7 books of the work; one participated at the 52nd Venice Biennale African Pavilion inside the exhibition Check List - Luanda Pop.

=== Take a Cab and Go for a Ride ===
Take a Cab and Go for a Ride is another work by Bili Bidjocka. Featured in Dak'Art 2000 exhibition, Take a Cab and Go for a Ride was an interactive art piece in the city of Dakar. Bidjocka created the piece by placing 16 flags around the city of Dakar, each one with two parallel lines representing the 'pause' symbol printed on them. Each flag was an invitation by Bidjocka to explore the city of Dakar.

=== Other works ===
- Skin, (panel), Albissola Marina

== Exhibitions ==
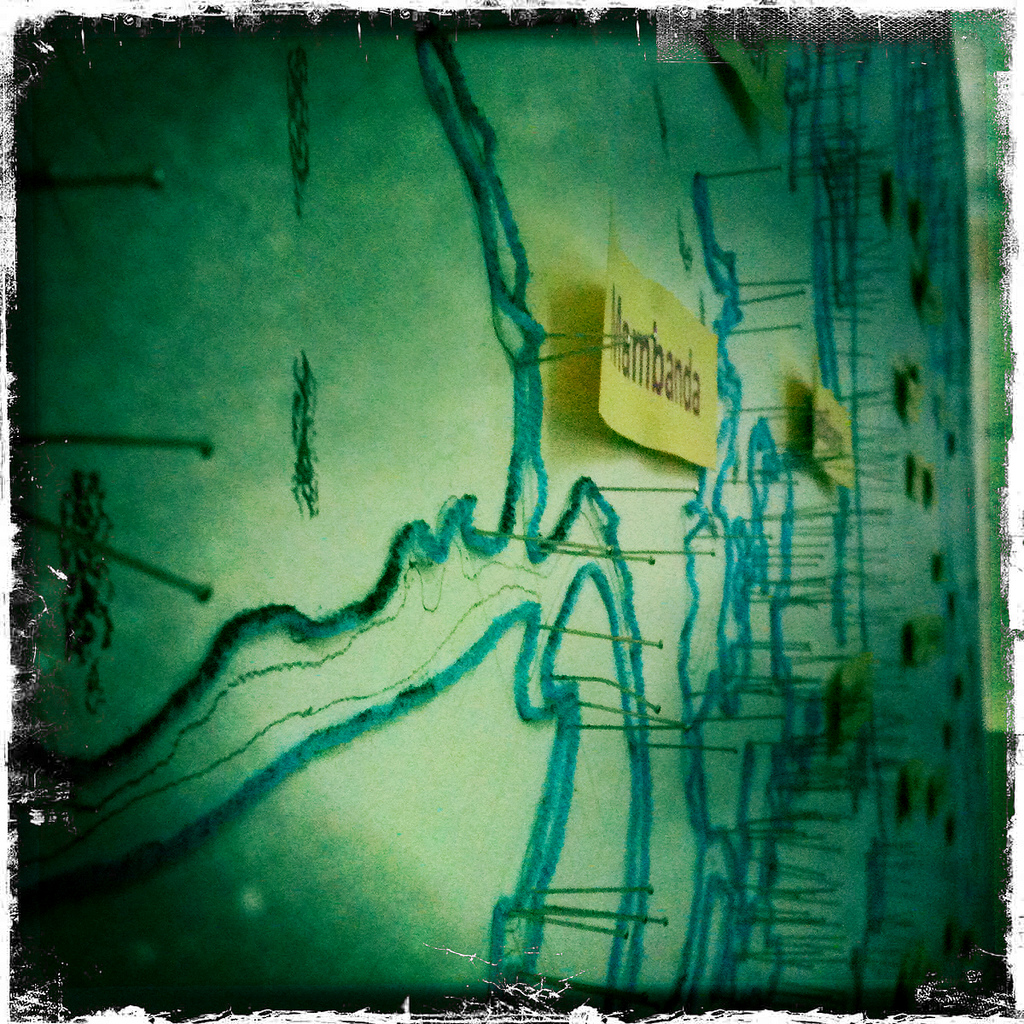
Bili Bidjocka, Jengu Project

- « …Do Not Take It, Do Not Eat It, This Is Not My Body… », stageBACK, Shanghai, People's Republic of China, 2012
- Jengu Project, 2010, SUD Salon Urbain de Douala 2010
- DetourIstanbul, 2009
- Detour, Paris and Berlin, 2008
- Check List, Venice Biennale, 2007
- Exhibition 02 - Collective exhibition, Exit11, Grand-Leez, 2007
- 3. Echigo-Tsumari Art Triennial 2006, Echigo-Tsumari Art Triennial, Niigata-ken, 2006
- Africa Remix - Contemporary Art of a Continent, Mori Art Museum, Tokyo, 2006
- EXHIBITION 00, Exit11, Grand-Leez, 2006
- Tapei Biennial 2004 - Do you believe in reality?, Taipei Biennial, Taipei, 2004
- El Corazón de las Tinieblas, Centro Atlántico de Arte Moderno (CAAM), Las Palmas de Gran Canaria, 2004
- Black President - The Art and Legacy of Fela Anikulapo-Kuti, New Museum of Contemporary Art, New York City, 2003
- Transferts, Palais des Beaux Arts, Paris, 2003
- Memórias Íntimas Marcas, MuHKA Museum voor Hedendaagse Kunst Antwerpen, Antwerp, 2000
- Bili Bidjocka: Reflection, Objectif, Hal, Antwerp, 2000
- Paris pour escale, ARC musée d'Art Moderne de la Ville de Paris, Paris, 2000
- Dak'Art 2000, Dakar, 2000
- Free Coke, The Greene Naftali Gallery, New York City, 1999
- Bili Bidjocka, Los Carpinteros and Rivane Neuenschwander, New Museum of Contemporary Art, New York City, 1998
- Bili Bidjocka: Crossing, USF Contemporary Museum, Tampa, United States, 1998
- Alternating Currents, Second Biennale of Johannesburg, Johannesburg, 1997
- 6 Biennale dell'Avana, La Havana, 1997

== Similar Artists ==
- Kendell Geers
- Tracey Rose

== See also ==
- Conceptual art
- Contemporary art
- Installation art
- Plastic arts

== Bibliography ==
- Barbara Vanderlinden, The work of Bili Bidjocka in Do you Believe in Reality, Taïpei Biennial, 2004.
- The marriage of earth & night by bili bidjockain el corazon de las tinieblas, catalogo, 2002.
- Philipe Pirotte, Bili Bidjocka, the jet lag experiment in objectif (projects), 2001.
- Joël Busca, L'arte contemporanea africana, L'Harmattan Italia, Torino, 2002, pp. 115–120 (ed. originale Perspectives sur l'art contemporain africain, L'Harmattan, Paris, 2000).
- Okwui Enwezor, Between Words... in Reading the Contemporary, 1999-2000.
- ON NAIT DANS L'ESPACE DE LA PEINTURE OU ON NE L'EST PAS, in Zeitwenden, Bonn, catalogo, 1999.
- Max Borka, De Kerst is Kort – Bili Bidjocka in "Standard Magazin", Dicembre 1999.
- Eduardo Costa, Report from Havana, The installation biennial, in "Art in America", Marzo 1998.
- Dan Cameron, Global Warming, "Art Forum International", dicembre 1997.
- LE PRINCIPE ET LA FAIM, Un Proyecto de Bili Bidjocka, in "Atlantica International", 18, 1997.
- Franklin Sirmans, Bili Bidjocka: Mélancholia, Sophistication, And Lightness, in "Flash Art", 32, 204, 1997.
- COLLAGE (JESUIS LA SEULE FEMME DE MAVIE...), By Bili Bidjocka, "Gagarine", 1, 2, 1997.
- Michel, N. (2010): Bili Bidjocka, une expérience poétique. Jeune Afrique. http://www.jeuneafrique.com/194495/culture/bili-bidjocka-une-exp-rience-po-tique/
- Ecriture Infinie (2011). Bili Bidjocka interview. https://vimeo.com/28065175
- Barbara Vanderlinden & Elena Filipovic, The work of Bili Bidjocka in Do you Believe in Reality, catalogo, Taïpei Biennial, 2004.
- Condon, Robert. "Writing the body: BILI BIDJOCKA AND BATO." Nka: Journal of Contemporary African Art 1995.3 (1995): 60-63.
- Sean O'Toole, Bili Bidjocka Focus: Begonias, the lure of travel, endless writing and an unfinished book, "Freeze Magazine", 119, novembre-dicembre 2008.
- Pensa, Iolanda (Ed.) 2017. Public Art in Africa. Art et transformations urbaines à Douala /// Art and Urban Transformations in Douala. Genève: Metis Presses. ISBN 978-2-94-0563-16-6
- Salley, Rael Jero. 2009. "Unfinished Visuality: Contemporary Art and Black Diaspora, 1964–2008." Order No. 3387024, The University of Chicago.
- Bedford, Emma. 2001. "Dak'Art 2000: In Search of the Magic Moment." Nka : Journal of Contemporary African Art (13) (Spring): 14-17.
