= Oliver Ressler =

Austrian artist (b.1970)

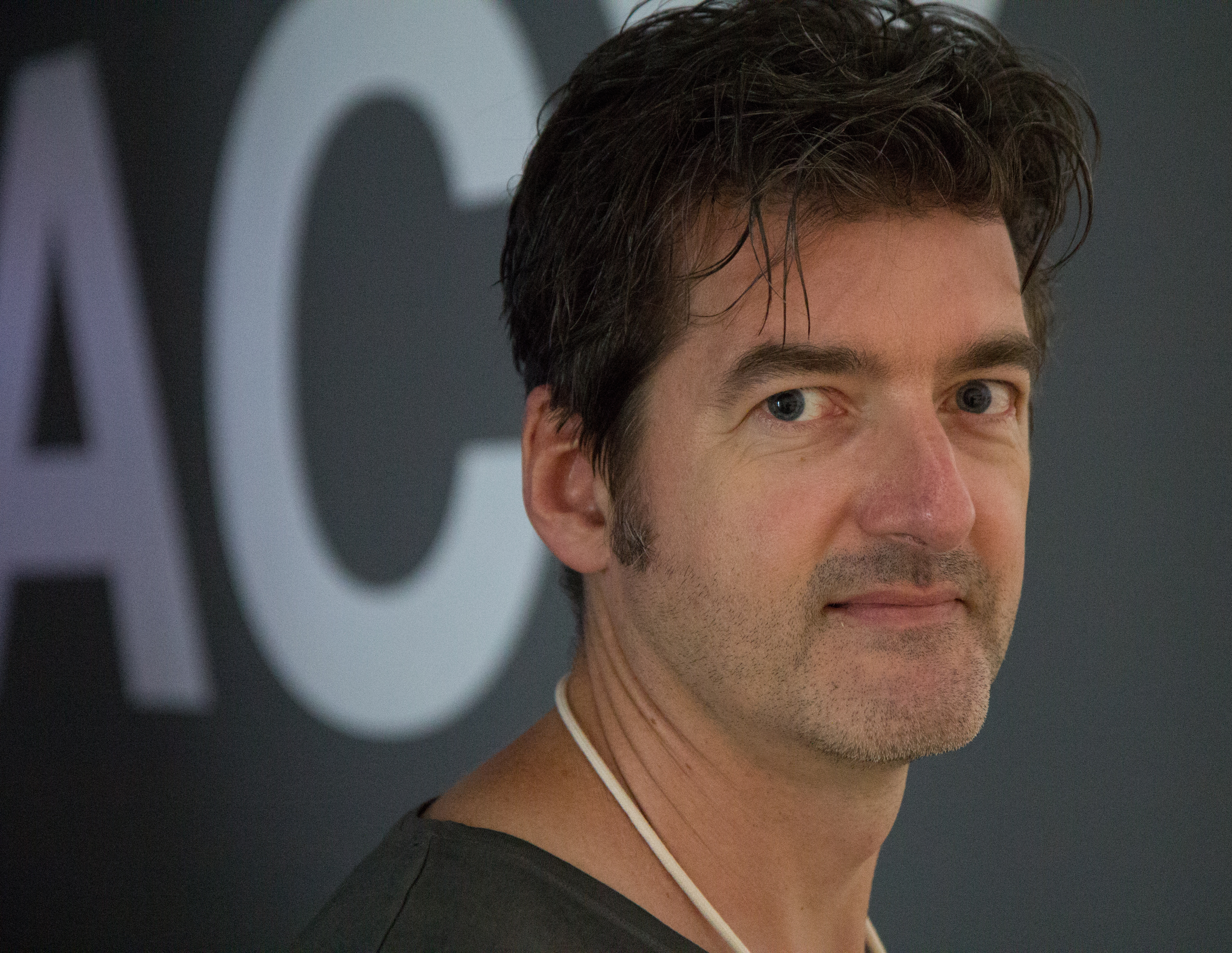
Oliver Ressler (2017, Documenta)

Oliver Ressler (born 1970 in Knittelfeld in Austria) is an artist who lives and works in Vienna. He produces theme-specific exhibitions, projects in the public space and videos on issues such as global capitalism, forms of resistance, social alternatives, racism and global warming. His work constantly tries to blur boundaries between art and activism.

== Major works ==
Alternative Economics, Alternative Societies is both an exhibit and a book. The exhibit was shown at 21 different venues, including solo-exhibitions at Galerija Skuc, Ljubljana, 2003; Kunstraum Lueneburg, Germany, 2004; Centro Cultural Conde Duque, MediaLabMadrid, Madrid, 2004; Platform Garanti Contemporary Art Center, Istanbul, 2005 and the Museum of Contemporary Art, Belgrade, 2005. The book is a collaborative project of Ressler and the Wyspa Institute of Art, Gdansk. The institute published the work in 2007.

Many of Ressler's works have been realized in collaborations: “Boom!” focuses on the central contradictions of globalized capitalism (with David Thorne), “European Corrections Corporation” on the phenomenon of prison privatization (with Martin Krenn), and “What Would It Mean To Win?” on the protests against the 33rd G8-summit in Heiligendamm (with Zanny Begg).

Ressler produced the films “Venezuela from Below”, 2004 and “5 Factories–Worker Control in Venezuela”, 2006, which was presented as a 6-channel video installation at the Berkeley Art Museum, USA (with Dario Azzellini).

Ressler has participated in more than 150 exhibitions, including the biennials in Prague, 2005; Seville, 2006; Moscow, 2007 and Taipei, 2008. For the Taipei Biennial 2008 Ressler also curated the exhibition "A World Where Many Worlds Fit" on the counter-globalization movement.

== Awards ==
In 2002, Ressler's video “This is what democracy looks like!” won the 1st prize of the International Media Art Award of the ZKM.

== See also ==
- Inclusive Democracy
- Worker cooperative
