= Bonaventure Soh Bejeng Ndikung =

Cameroonian artist and curator (born 1977)

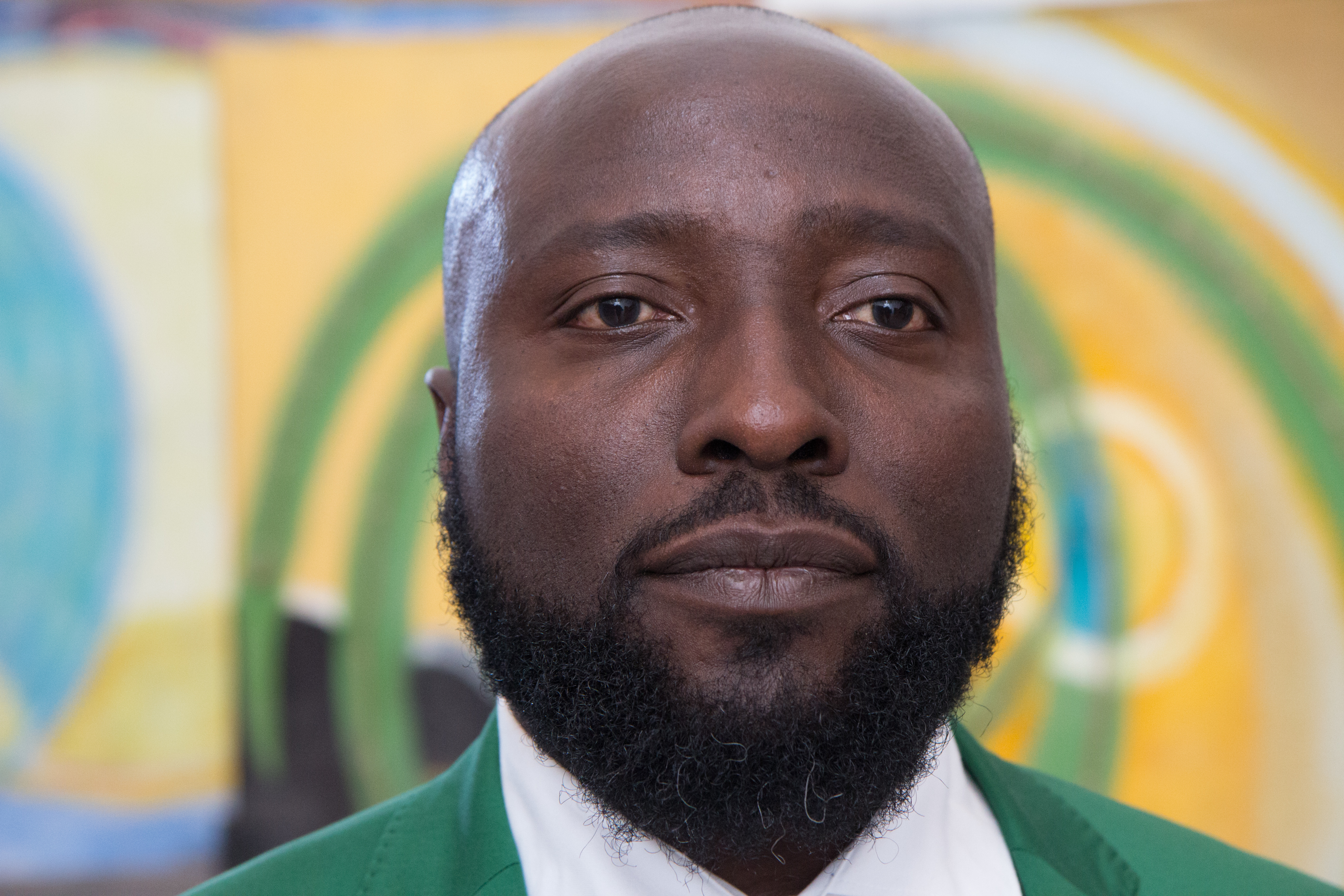
Ndikung in 2017

Bonaventure Soh Bejeng Ndikung (born in 1977 in Yaoundé, Cameroon) is a contemporary art curator and writer. He lives in Berlin.

== Early life and education ==
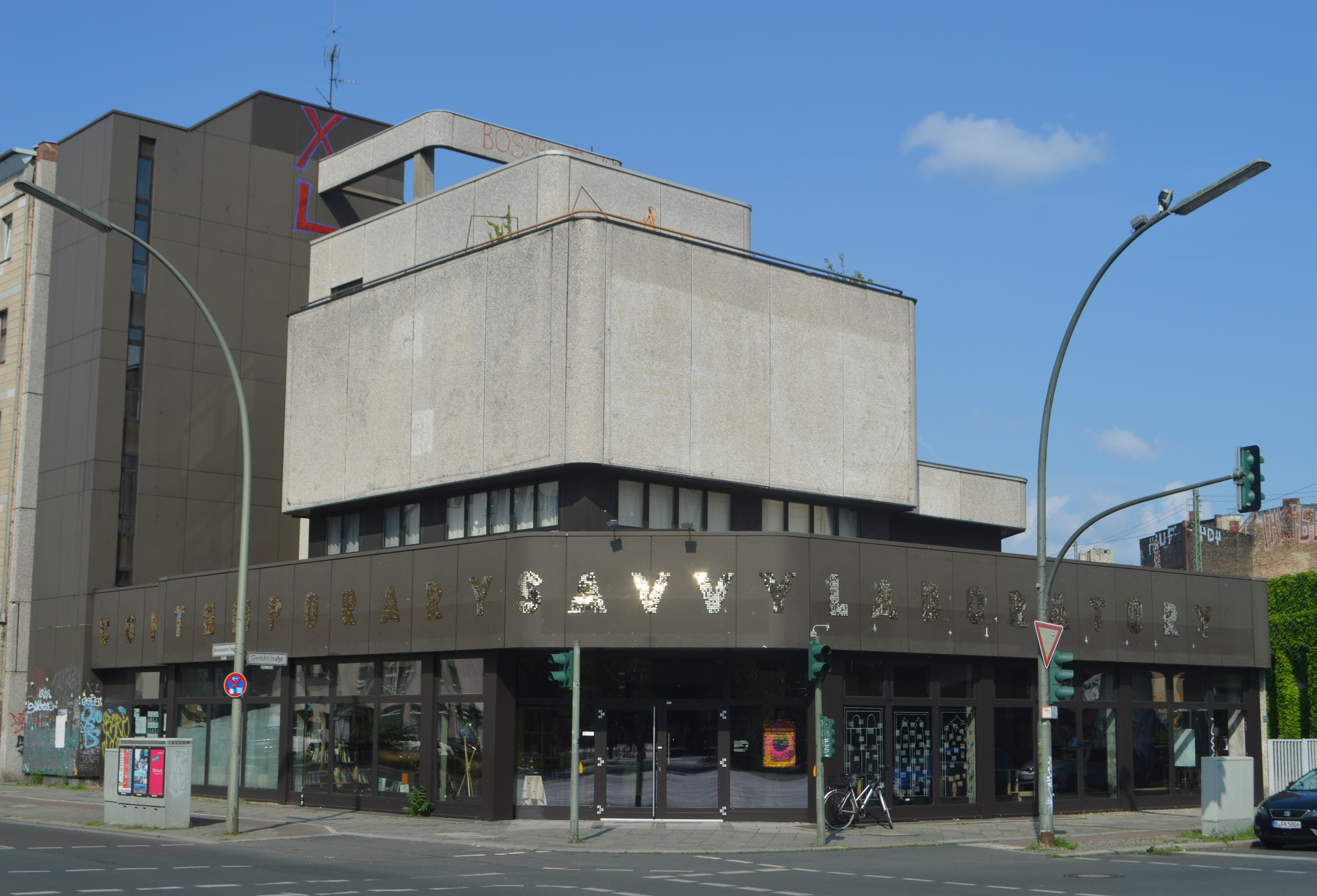
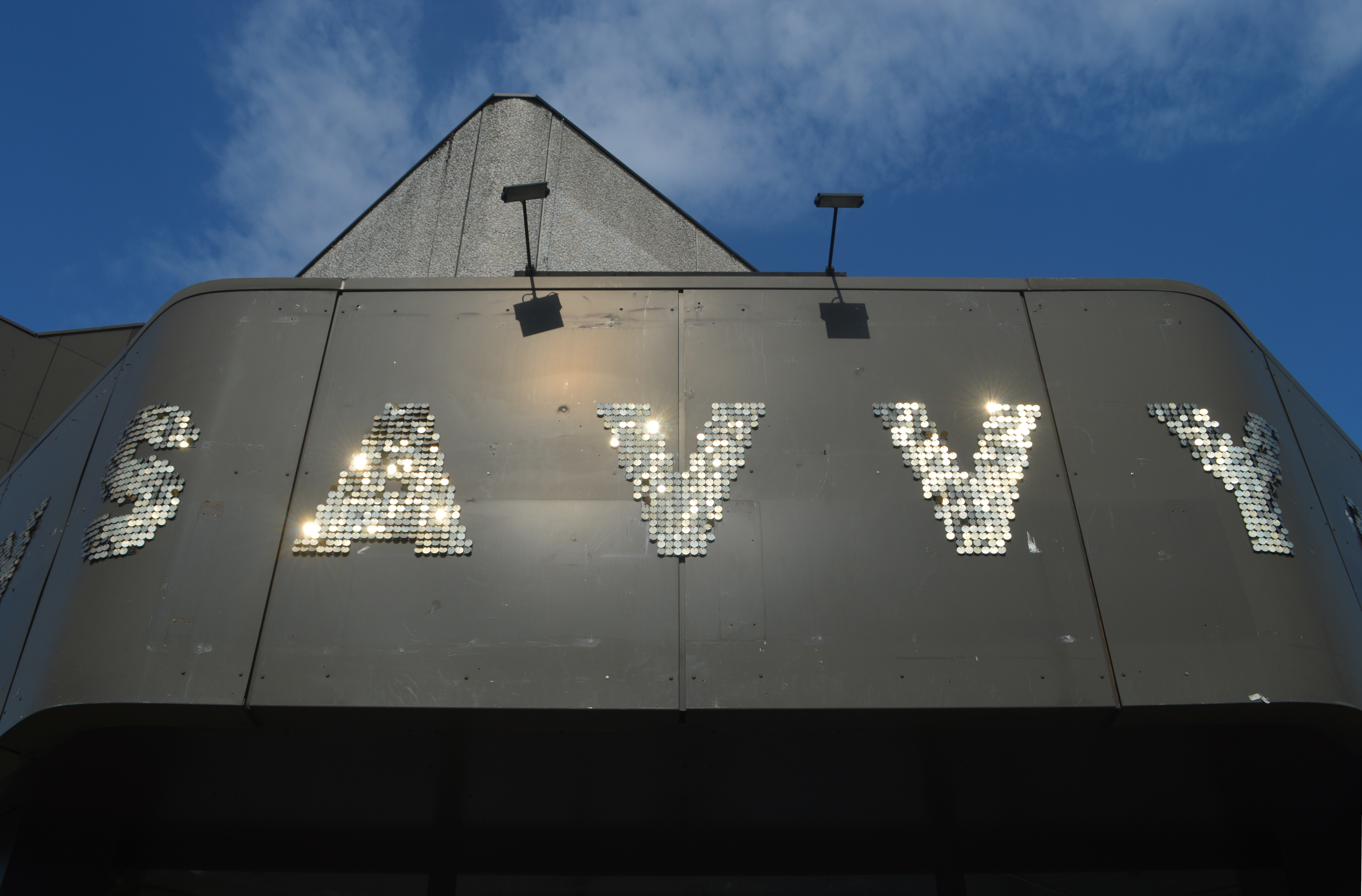
The SAVVY CONTEMPORARY LABORATORY at Reinickendorfer Straße in the Wedding quarter of Berlin. It moved in September 2020 into this building, which used to house a supermarket and most recently a casino.

Ndikung moved to Germany in 1997 to study at Technische Universität Berlin (TU). He holds a doctorate in medical biotechnology from the Heinrich-Heine-Universität Düsseldorf /TU Berlin, and a post-doctorate in biophysics from the University of Montpellier.

== Career ==
=== Curating ===
Dr. Ndikung is the founding director of SAVVY Contemporary, an independent project space and discoursive platform for exhibitions, performances and other events. It situates itself on the threshold between concepts of the West and non-West to understand and deconstruct them.

From 2015 to 2018, together with Solvej Helweg Ovesen, Ndikung was a curator at Galerie Wedding, a public gallery in Berlin-Wedding. Ndikung and Ovesen also co-curated the year long Danish art project Images 2016 – An Age of our Own Making, that took place in Holbæk, Roskilde and Copenhagen.

In 2015, Ndikung contributed a key essay to the project The Citizen, which the German photographer Tobias Zielony created for the German pavilion at the 56th Venice Biennale. Ndikung's piece with the title "The Penultimate Dance On The Roof" dealt with the self-empowerment of the activist refugees, who had occupied the building of the former Gerhart-Hauptmann-School in Berlin-Kreuzberg. The double-page was published by the daily The Citizen in Khartoum, Sudan, and put on display in the Pavilion as a migrating image.

In the same year, Dr. Ndikung became part of the curatorial team of Adam Szymczyk's documenta 14, in the role of Curator at large.

Together with Pauline Doutreluingne Dr. Ndikung curated the Performeum at the Wiener Festwochen in 2017. Ndikung was a guest curator for the 13th Dakar Biennale in Senegal, under the artistic direction of Simon Njami.

As part of the Miracle Workers Collective he curated the Finnish pavilion at the 58th Venice Biennale in 2019. He was artistic director of the 12th Bamako Encounters in 2019, a biennale for African photography in Mali. Ndikung is artistic director for Sonsbeek 2020-2024, a large-scale sculpture exhibition that takes place in Arnhem, the Netherlands.

Ndikung was a guest professor in curatorial studies and sound art at the Städelschule in Frankfurt from 2017 to 2019, and together with artist Nasan Tur, is professor for the Spatial Strategies MA program at Weißensee Academy of Art Berlin.

In June 2021, Ndikung was appointed as the Director of Berlin's Haus der Kulturen der Welt, to take over from Bernd M. Scherer on 1 January 2023.

Ndikung is the chief curator of the 2025 São Paulo Art Biennial.

=== Other activities ===
In 2022, Ndikung was a member of the jury of the Venice Biennale, chaired by Adrienne Edwards.

== Recognition ==
In October 2020 Bonaventure Soh Bejeng Ndikung was awarded the Order of Merit of Berlin, in "recognition of the work Savvy Contemporary has been doing over the past decade".
