= Anna Daučíková =

Slovak visual artist and activist

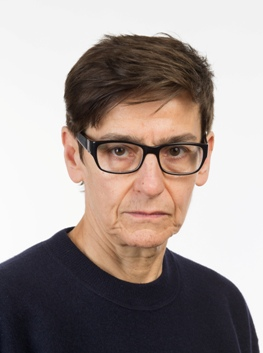
- Born: 18 August 1950 (age 75); Bratislava
- Education: Academy of Fine Arts in Bratislava, 1978
- Known for: video art

Anna Daučíková (born 18 August 1950) is Slovak visual artist and activist based in Prague and Bratislava. From 1999 to 2011 she was a professor at the Academy of Fine Arts and Design, Bratislava and currently teaches at the Academy of Fine Arts, Prague. Daučíková is one of the first Slovak artists to openly identify as queer and engage with feminism.

== Work ==
In the 1980s, after graduating from the Academy of Fine Arts in Bratislava, she moved to Moscow, working on automatic abstract paintings questioning the notion of authorship. She lived in the Soviet Union for 12 years during the period of perestroika. She did not exhibit her artwork publicly during this time. During this period she produced black-and-white photo series documenting certain aspects of late Soviet era daily life, for example Moscow/Women/Sunday (1989 – 1990), which documented Moscow women on the street. During this time she also produced photo series of drinking glasses on window-ledges, including Family Album (1990), first exhibited in 2017, in which the various compositions represent standard and nonstandard family structures. On her return to Bratislava in 1991 she co-founded the Slovak feminist cultural journal Aspekt. Throughout the 1990s, she experimented with the representation of sexuality depicted in the medium of video, often combining video screenings with live performances.

She has exhibited in a number of major international exhibitions, including Gender Check (2009–2010) at Mumok Vienna and Zachęta National Gallery of Art in Warsaw, and documenta 14 (2017) in Athens and Kassel. In 2018, she was the winner of the Schering Stiftung Art Award and had a solo exhibition at the KW Institute for Contemporary Art Berlin.
