= Antonio Vega Macotela =

Mexican visual artist

José Antonio Vega Macotela
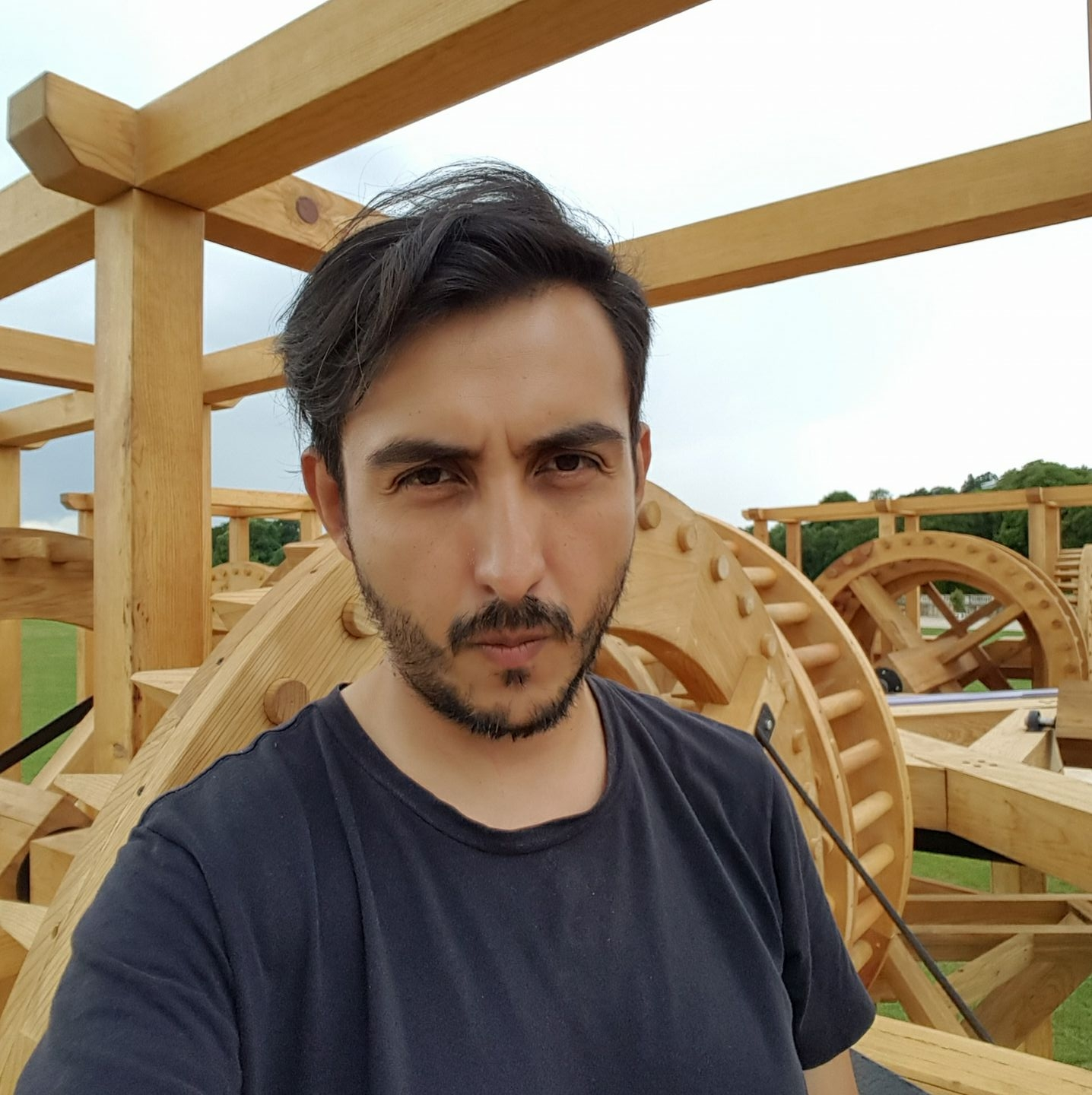
- Born: 1980; Mexico City, Mexico
- Education: National School of Fine Arts, Mexico City
- Known for: Participatory art

José Antonio Vega Macotela (born 1980, Mexico City, Mexico) is a multidisciplinary visual artist working across media and geographies in collaboration with diverse groups such as Indigenous communities, incarcerated people, soldiers, miners, and hackers, among others. The artist lives and works between Mexico City and Amsterdam.

== Work ==
Antonio Vega Macotela's work draws from social practice and exchange to comment on capitalism and economic values and symbols. Through his artistic practice, he often negotiates people's requests in exchange for his time. At times, Macotela works in collaboration with independent groups to bring his artistic vision to fruition, for instance, he worked with hackers in a 2019 solo exhibition in Belgium and most recently in Spain (2022).

Macotela holds a Bachelor or Fine Art from the National School of Fine Arts, Mexico City, in Mexico (2004).

He was an artist in residence at Amant Foundation, New York; and was the Intermedia Artist in Residence programme at Parsons School of Design's department of Art, Media and Technology, New York (2012). He also has held residences in Amsterdam (2011–2012), at the Le Pavillon, Palais de Tokyo, Paris (2014); at ACC-Rijksakademie residency programme, Gwangju, Korea (2015); and at Gasworks, London (2018).

He has presented his work at international and large scale exhibitions such as the Manifesta 9, Ghent (2012); 3rd Poly/Graphic Triennial of Puerto Rico (2012); 2nd New Museum Triennial: The Ungovernables, New York; Prospect 3. New Orleans (2014); Istanbul Biennial (2014); Documenta 14, Kassel, in Germany, and Athens, Greece (2017); “Stories of Almost Everyone”, Hammer Museum, Los Angeles (2018); 12th Taipei Biennial, China (2020); 34th São Paulo Biennial, Brazil (2021); and the High Line Art Commission, New York (2021); Toi et moi, on ne vit pas sur la même planète”, Centre Pompidou-Metz (2021).

=== Collections ===
- Hammer Museum, University of California, Los Angeles, United States
- Potosi, 2022. Kadist, San Francisco, United States
- Museo Amparo, Puebla, Mexico
- Pérez Art Museum Miami, United States
- Time Divisa (Fragmento), 2005–2010. Museu d'Art Contemporani de Barcelona (MACBA), Spain
