= Lucius Burckhardt =

Swiss sociologist and economist (1925–2003)

Lucius Burckhardt (March 12, 1925 in Davos – August 26, 2003 in Basel) was a Swiss sociologist and economist. He was an important thinker in architectural theory and design theory and the founder of strollology.

== Legacy ==
Burckhardt's strollological methods were taken up by his student, the German artist Gerhard Lang, whose Mobile Zebra Crossing (1993), a procession with a portable pedestrian crossing through the streets of Kassel, was conceived in honour of Burckhardt as the founder of the discipline.

== Publications ==
- Lucius Burckhardt Writings. Rethinking Man-made Environments (Hrsg. Jesko Fezer / Martin Schmitz), Springer (Ambra), Wien/New York, 2012. ISBN 978-3990434956
