= Experimenter Gallery =

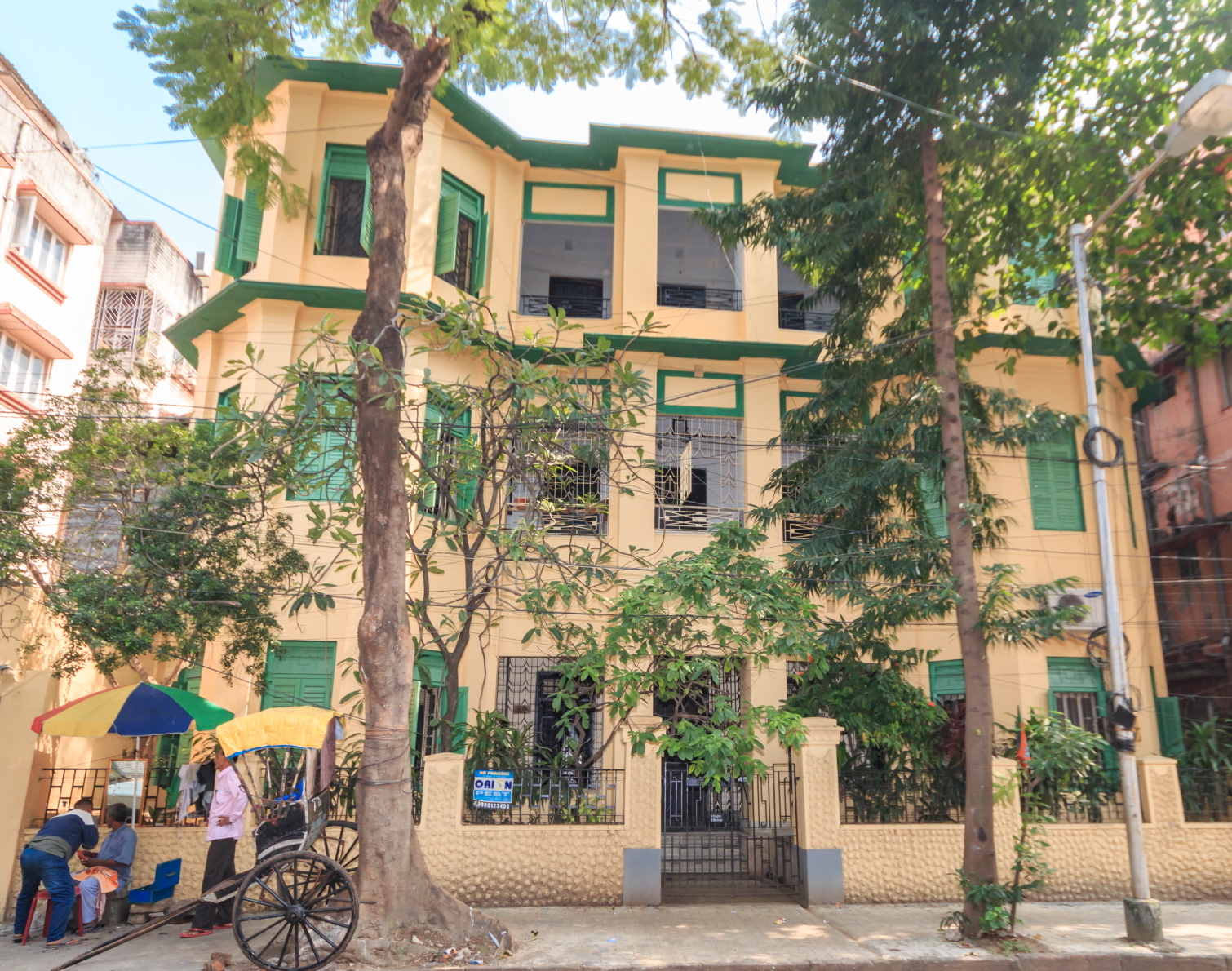
- Gallery facade
- Established: 2009
- Location: Hindustan Road, Kolkata; Ballygunge Place, Kolkata
- Coordinates: 22°31′15″N 88°21′53″E; 22°31′39″N 88°22′13″E
- Type: Contemporary art gallery
- Founders: Priyanka & Prateek Raja
- Website: experimenter.in

Experimenter is a contemporary art gallery co-founded by Priyanka and Prateek Raja in Kolkata. It represents several important artists in the contemporary art scene from across the globe. The gallery functions as an incubator for contemporary art practice spread across various disciplines and media.

== History ==
Experimenter was launched in 2009 to create a platform for the visual arts beyond the conventional white cube format.

The original location of the gallery is its Hindustan Road space that was established in 2009. On 28 February 2018, Experimenter launched its second gallery at Ballygunge Place. Both spaces now run simultaneously.

== Artists represented ==
- Adip Dutta
- Ayesha Sultana
- Bani Abidi
- Biraaj Dodiya
- CAMP
- Julien Segard
- Kanishka Raja
- Krishna Reddy
- Mehreen Murtaza
- Moyra Davey
- Naeem Mohaiemen
- Prabhakar Pachpute
- Praneet Soi
- Radhika Khimji
- Rathin Barman
- Raqs Media Collective
- Sahil Naik
- Sakshi Gupta
- Samson Young
- Sanchayan Ghosh
- Sohrab Hura
- Soumya Sankar Bose

== Notable exhibitions ==
- 2009 – Group exhibition, Freedom Is Notional by Bani Abidi, Naeem Mohaiemen, Shilpa Gupta.
- 2010 – Group exhibition, This is Unreal by Raqs Media Collective, Susanta Mandal, Yamini Nayar.
- 2011 – Tino Sehgal’s first solo in India This Situation, in collaboration with the Goethe-Institut//Max Mueller Bhavan, Kolkata; The Young Man Was, Naeem Mohaiemen’s debut solo and his first solo in India.
- 2012 – Rathin Barman’s debut solo And My Eyes Filled with Sand…
- 2013 – The Land Eaters, Prabhakar Pachpute’s first solo held in collaboration with Clark House Initiative; First show of the exhibition series, Filament by Amar Kanwar, CAMP, Naeem Mohaiemen, Omer Fast; The Indian premiere of Bani Abidi’s body of works Then it was Moulded Anew.
- 2014 – Ayesha Sultana’s debut solo Outside the Field of View; Sanchayan Ghosh’s second solo at the gallery, Reversed Perspective: 3 Conjunctions; Group exhibition, Waiting for the Wind.
- 2015 – As if – I, Rock/Paper/Scissors - first of the four-part retrospective exhibition series (As if) by CAMP; Anywhere but Here, Julien Segard’s debut solo; Praneet Soi’s debut solo exhibition Srinagar.
- 2016 – Samson Young’s debut show in India, Mastery of Language Affords Remarkable Power; Edition Maker, a Krishna Reddy retrospective.
- 2017 – Sahil Naik’s debut solo Ground Zero; Photographer Sohrab Hura’s debut solo Sweet Life.
- 2018 – I Wish to Let You Fall off My Hands, Chapter I by Bani Abidi & Naeem Mohaiemen; Experimenter Ballygunge Place, inaugural show, I Wish to Let You Fall off My Hands, Chapter II; Soumya Sankar Bose’s debut solo Full Moon on a Dark Night; Drawn from Practice - a dialogue across practices and spaces, shown simultaneously at both Experimenter galleries; Moyra Davey’s first solo in India, Bring My Garters / Do Nothing.
- 2019 – Experimenter’s 10th anniversary show, group exhibition Searching for Stars Amongst the Crescents; First Experimenter Outpost iteration, Let’s Sing an Old Song by Soumya Sankar Bose; To a New Form - solo by the late Indian master printmaker sculptor, Krishna Reddy.
- 2020 – Photographer Sohrab Hura’s second solo Spill; Biraaj Dodiya’s debut solo Stone is a Forehead; First online exhibition, Filament Online Film Exhibition, Part 1.
- 2021 – Adip Dutta’s works and Meera Mukherjee’s lesser known practices exhibited as Nestled; A solo exhibition of paintings Bare Bones by Ayesha Sultana, an artist’s solitary practice working in isolation, amidst pandemic; Photographer Soumya Sankar Bose’s second solo, an ongoing body of work on the Marichjhapi massacre, Where the Birds Never Sing.

== Art fair participation ==
Experimenter participates in the leading art fairs of the world including Art Basel in Basel (since 2013), Art Basel in Hong Kong (since 2014), Frieze Art Fair in London (since 2010), Frieze Art Fair in New York (since 2012), FIAC Paris (2016–18), Art Dubai (since 2011) and India Art Fair, New Delhi (since 2011).

== Publishing ==
The publishing wing of the gallery, Experimenter Books, was launched in 2016 to function as a publishing partner for its artists. It works towards producing artist-books, monographs and art objects. It also explores the vast creative possibilities of bookmaking, displays particular interest in design and closely collaborates with artists to conceive and envisage each book. One can also find the gallery’s annual catalogues under this initiative alongside the Experimenter Labs Reader, both of which are available for free online access for anyone wanting to give it a read. The Experimenter Labs Reader is a guest-edited anthology of prose, poetry, essays, images by artists, activists, musicians, poets, writers, photographers, philosophers.

== Educational and other initiatives ==
=== Educational initiatives ===
==== Experimenter Curator’s Hub ====
The Experimenter Curator’s Hub is an annual programme, started by the gallery in 2012. It brings under one roof, the most influential curatorial minds in the contemporary art scene around the world to discuss, debate and create a discourse around curatorial practices. With a lack of institutional discourse formulation around curation, the gallery co-founders decided to launch this initiative to start a much-needed conversation on curatorial practices for artists, curators, critics and audiences to critically engage with and understand curation as a distinctive discipline.

In an interview to the Firstpost, they said, "We both agree that one of the biggest inhibitors to knowledge in our country are our structures of learning and education, and we are deeply interested in breaking these structures even in our limited capacities. We re-evaluate our roles as directors of Experimenter all the time and have been thinking about how we can make a definitive impact to the world we inhabit individually and as directors of our program. We have felt over time, that discourse and conversation lies at the crux of understanding our dystopian contemporary moment and possibly the only way to establish a future of awareness that appreciates plurality and celebrates contradiction and diversity and would like to invite thinkers, writers, curators, artists, philosophers, architects, designers and so on from all over the world."

The hub is open for all to attend and was shifted online in the year 2020 owing to the global pandemic situation. All presentations by curators and panel discussions are archived as video recordings on the gallery’s website as freely accessible resources for those interested in listening to and learning about the various curatorial practices from all over the world. The hub has had participating curators like Leuli Eshraghi, Reem Fadda, Adam Szymczyk, Bonaventure Soh Bejeng Ndikung, Doryun Chong, Sheikha Hoor Al Qasimi, Naomi Beckwith, Natasha Ginwala, Gitanjali Dang, Hans Ulrich Obrist, Abhay Maskara, Raqs Media Collective, Tasneem Zakaria Mehta, Shumon Basar, Pooja Sood, Dayanita Singh and more.

==== Experimenter Learning Program ====
The Experimenter Learning Program (ELP) was launched in 2018 with the vision of knowledge creation and increased audience engagement in order to make the gallery an active space for dialogue, discussion, debate and learning. It is a long-term education program rooted in visual culture and has a year-long schedule including Experimenter Curator’s Hub, workshops, lecture performances, symposia, salon-style classrooms and Experimenter Juniors’ Program.

==== Generator - Co-operative art production fund ====
In April 2020, in the very early stages in the global COVID-19 pandemic, The Generator co-operative art fund was created by Experimenter in collaboration with artists and friends. This collaborative fund awards production grants to aid artists’ projects. It is a decentralized funding framework exclusively meant for artists not represented by the gallery and is open to all visual artists irrespective of medium, age or provenance. The applications are accepted on a rolling basis throughout the year and are reviewed by a rotating jury.

In an interview with Ocula magazine, gallery co-founder Prateek Raja said, "One of our early conversations was with Bani Abidi, who is based in Berlin, about how grant-giving is such a power-disseminating activity, where an organization or a group of patrons decide to give something to the artist, as if you are bestowing upon them this honor. This is a conversation we renewed, because we figured we would be closed for a few months, and very quickly we launched Generator, which came out with other initiatives from the Labs."

=== Other initiatives ===
==== Experimenter Radio ====
A curated Spotify channel consisting of music and podcasts by artists, writers, thinkers, collaborators, philosophers that brings together an acoustic experience which can be a source of comfort, inspiration and musings.

==== Filament ====
Filament is a space for streaming films and video art by a wide range of artists and filmmakers.

==== Deep Dive Series ====
A series of in-depth online (sometimes live) conversations of artists with curators, writers, gallerists or other artists and peers who know the artist’s practice and thoughts intimately. These are shared as podcasts, video interviews, live online studio visits, book readings, and more.

== Reception ==
In 2014, Experimenter won the ‘Contemporary Gallery of the Year (Exhibiting young artists)’ award at the Forbes Art Awards 2014.

In 2016, Experimenter won the 'Gallery of the Year' award at the India Today Art Awards 2016.

In 2020, Experimenter co-founders Prateek and Priyanka Raja were named in the ArtReview Power 100 list of the ‘Most influential people in the contemporary art world’.
