= Bani Abidi =

Pakistani artist (born 1971)

- Born: 1971 (age 54–55); Karachi, Pakistan
- Known for: Video, Photography & Drawing
- Website: www.baniabidi.com

Bani Abidi (born 1971) is a Pakistani artist working with video, photography and drawing. She studied visual arts at the National College of Arts in Lahore and at the School of the Art Institute of Chicago. In 2011, she was invited for the DAAD Artists-in-Berlin program, and since then has been residing in Berlin.

== Early life and education ==
Abidi was born in Karachi, the capital of Pakistani province of Sindh, in 1971. She has lived in New Delhi and Karachi, and currently resides in Berlin. In 1994, she chose to study painting and printmaking, earning a Bachelor of Arts from the National College of Arts in Lahore, Pakistan. From 1997 she studied at the Art Institute of Chicago, completing a master's degree in 1999.

While attending the Art Institute, she developed a profound interest in cinematography that led to her engagement with video as a medium. This is when performance and photography were incorporated in her creative process. These mediums have provided her with a powerful tool to address the problems of nationalism, specifically those surrounding the Indo-Pakistani conflicts and the violent legacy of the 1947 partition which divided the two countries. The uneven representation of these defining moments in the mass media was also featured in her works. She mainly focused upon how these issues affected everyday lives and individual experiences.

== Artistic practice ==
=== Early works ===
The subject of Abidi's earliest venture was a trilogy of humorous video diptychs that put spotlight on the ongoing hostility between Pakistan and India. She played the role of both an Indian woman and a Pakistani woman in Mangoes (1999), where they reminisce about the old times while eating mangoes. Their camaraderie is gradually replaced by conflict as nationalism, about the variety and quality of mangoes native to each country, hampers the discussion in progress. On the similar lines, her work The News (2001) depicts the news anchors reporting the same international incident from their respective national perspectives. The conventions of costumes and the languages depicting each of the nations are precise. Even though these videos showcase the visual differences, the fact that Abidi herself plays both the roles puts emphasis on the cultural similarities between the two nations. It comes across as a visualization of the term “the nearness of difference” put forth by the scholar Homi Bhabha.

These early works, infused with humor and irony, highlights ways in which nationalism is enacted, reinforced and often subverted in everyday life. This was a theme that Abidi returned to in her subsequent videos. Applying a keen ethnographic eye to elements of Pakistani culture and politics, dialogues and a conventional narrative are often absent in her pieces. Her video works contain audio-visual footage put together in a striking fashion that makes the fictional narrative appears life-like. The film-making gaze of the artist offers a close-up view of a range of experiences of waiting wherein viewers can immerse themselves. It is through this experience of waiting that clear social hierarchies are visually established.

In addition to creating videos, Abidi also works with photography, digital imaging, and installations. Her photographic series Karachi (2009), is based in the multi-religious city where the artist grew up. During the holy month of Ramadan, the images were shot on the deserted streets of the city after sundown. When the Muslim masses retired indoors to end the day’s fast, Abidi staged scenarios that portrayed members of Pakistan’s religious minorities – Hindus, Christians and Zoroastrians. They emerged into the twilight to briefly claim some space in a public sphere that is quite hostile to religious differences. It is presented to viewers as a problem of perception, subtly questioning the inability of Pakistan's political vision to guarantee equal rights for all its citizens, regardless of religion.

=== Recent works ===
The threshold between the security of private life and the increasingly violent & unpredictable public space in contemporary Pakistan is a recurring recent interest for Abidi. Her more recent works builds upon her interests in satirizing bureaucracy, masculinity and patriotism. This allowed for poignantly subversive discourses to emerge even more than before. In her video work An Unforeseen Situation (2015), Abidi relates to a series of state-run competitions, organized by the Ministry of Sport in the Pakistani region of Punjab in 2014. According to reports, Pakistan broke several world records during these mass events. The artist used this as an opportunity to tell her own version of such an event – a failed competition for the greatest mass singing of the national anthem. In this way she unmasks the absurdity of such interactions between state-run staging and civilian performance.

== Notable exhibitions and collections ==
=== Solo exhibitions ===
Bani’s work has been a part of solo exhibitions at Sharjah Art Foundation, Sharjah (2019); Gropius-Bau, Berlin (2019); Neuer Berliner Kunstverein, Berlin (2017); Kunsthaus Hamburg (2016); Gandhara Art Space, Karachi (2016); Dallas Contemporary, US (2015); Kunstverein Arnsberg, Germany (2014); Experimenter Gallery, Kolkata (2012) and Baltic Centre for Contemporary Art, Gateshead, UK (2011) among many others.

=== Group exhibitions ===
Abidi's creations have also been featured in the group exhibitions at Lahore Biennale (2018); Gesellschaft für Aktuelle Kunst, Bremen, Germany (2017); Kiran Nadar Museum of Art, Delhi (2016); Bristol City Museum and Art Gallery, UK (2016); Museum of Modern Art, New York (2015); Latvia Centre for Contemporary Art, Riga (2015); Aga Khan Museum, Toronto (2014); 8th Berlin Biennale (2014); Guggenheim Museum, New York (2013); Haus der Kulturen der Welt, Berlin (2012); Kochi-Muziris Biennale (2012); 9th Shanghai Biennale (2012); dOCUMENTA (13), Kassel, Germany (2012); Devi Art Foundation, New Delhi (2012); ZKM Center for Art and Media, Karlsruhe, Germany (2011); 10th Lyon Biennale, France (2009); 7th Gwangju Biennale (2008); Singapore Biennale (2006) and Asia Society, New York (2006) being some of them.

=== Collections ===
Abidi’s work is a part of the collections at the Museum of Modern Art, New York; Guggenheim Museum, New York; British Museum, London; Tate Modern, London; Burger Collection, Hong Kong; Devi Arts Foundation, Gurugram, India and Sharjah Art Foundation to name a few.

She has been an artist-in-residence at DAAD Berliner Kunstlerprogram, Berlin (2011); Fukuoka Artist Exchange Program, Japan (2005); KHOJ International Artists Residency, New Delhi (2001) and Skowhegan School of Painting and Sculpture, US (2000). She was awarded a Sharjah Art Foundation Production Programme grant in 2010.
