= Pooja Sood =

Indian curator and art management consultant

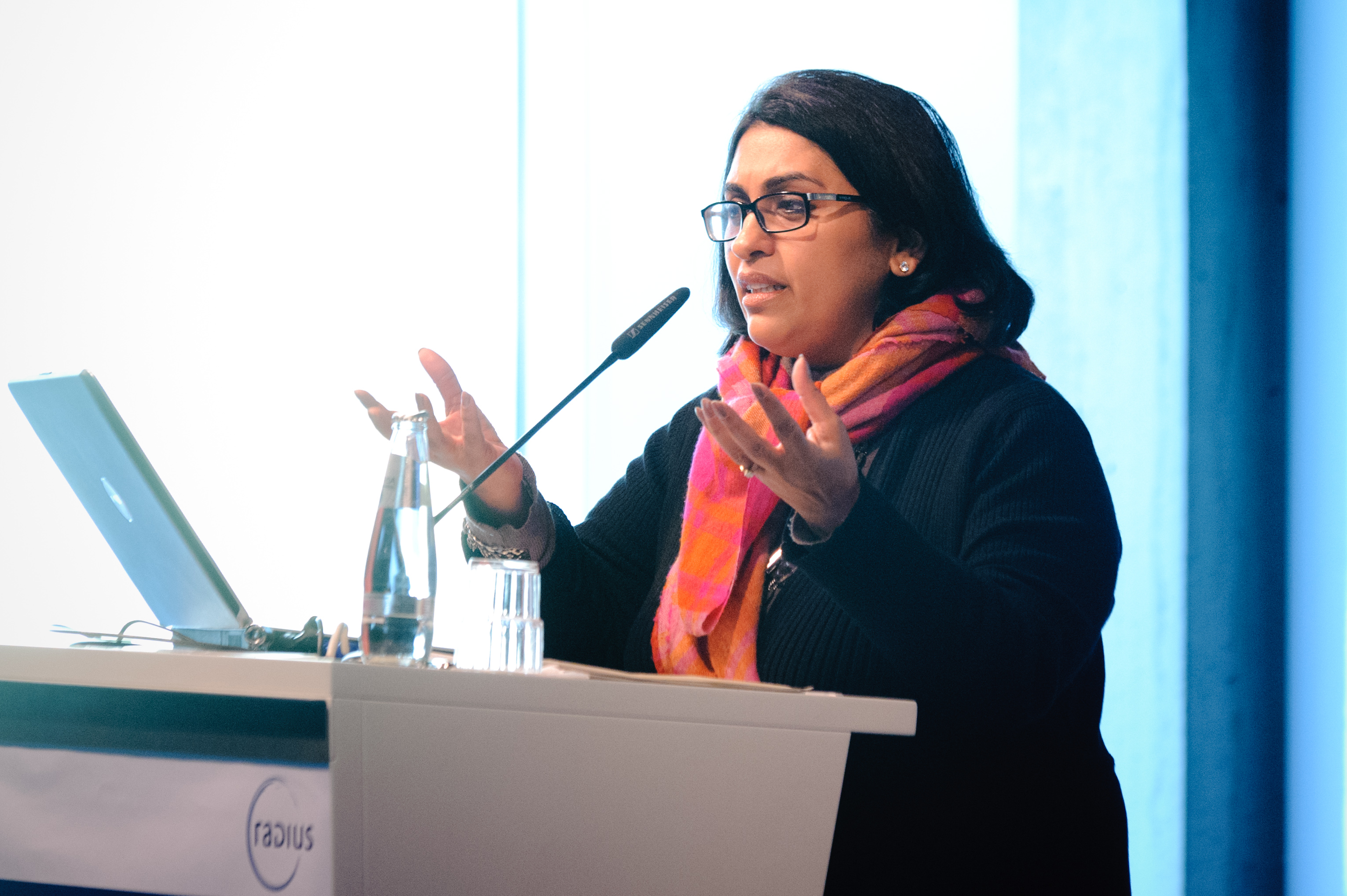
Pooja Sood, 2012

Pooja Sood is an Indian curator and art management consultant. She is also the founding member and Director of KHOJ International Artist's Association.

== Education ==
Pooja is a mathematics graduate and has an MBA in Marketing (1984–86) from the Symbiosis Institute of Business Management, Pune. Sood has an MA in Art History (1990–92) from Punjab University, Chandigarh. She also has a certificate in Cultural Policy from the CEU, Budapest (2007); and in Arts Management from the European Summer Academy of ICCM, Salzburg (2000).

== Career ==
Pooja started her career with Delhi-based Eicher Gallery in 1994 where she was the curator and administrator till 1998. During her time with them she curated over 20 exhibitions. In 1997, Sood along with Bharti Kher, Subodh Gupta, Manisha Parekh, Anita Dube and Prithpal S. Ladi founded Khoj International Artists’ Association. From 1998 - 2007, she coordinated the KHOJ International artist's workshops in Delhi (1998-2001), Bangalore (2002 -2003), Mumbai (2005), Kolkata (2006) and Srinagar (2007). From 2000 to 2010, she was the Regional Coordinator of the Triangle Arts Trust, UK where she researched and facilitated the establishment of independent not for profit visual art organizations in Sri Lanka, Pakistan, Bangladesh and Nepal called SANA (South Asian Network for the Arts). She was the Curator of the Apeejay Media Gallery from 2002 to 2007. From October 2007- December 2008, she was also the Director of Artists Pension Trust, Mumbai. She was appointed as the artistic director and curator of 48 °C Public.Art.Ecology, a public art project, commissioned by the Goethe Institut in December 2008.

Since 2009, she has been serving as the Director of ARThinkSouthAsia (ATSA), an arts management programme for young managers in the cultural sphere. From November 2015 to February 2019; Sood also served as the Director General of Jawahar Kala Kendra, an arts centre in Jaipur established by the Rajasthan Government. Sood has been on several international juries, like the IAPA award of the Institute of Public Art, Shanghai (2014), the Asia Pacific Breweries Signature prize hosted by the Singapore Art Museum (2014–15) and the Korean Art prize, Seoul (2013).

Sood is currently working on curating the Pune Biennale which is to be held in November–December 2019.

== Achievements ==
Sood was the recipient of a Junior Fellowship from the Human Resource Development (HRD) Ministry, Government of India and developed a Directory of Funding for the Arts in 1998. She is also a Chevening scholar on the Clore Leadership Programme, UK (2009-2011).

== Publications ==
She is the editor of The Khoj Book Of Contemporary Indian Art: 1997- 2007, published by HarperCollins, 2010.
