= Samson Young =

Hong Kong artist (born 1979)

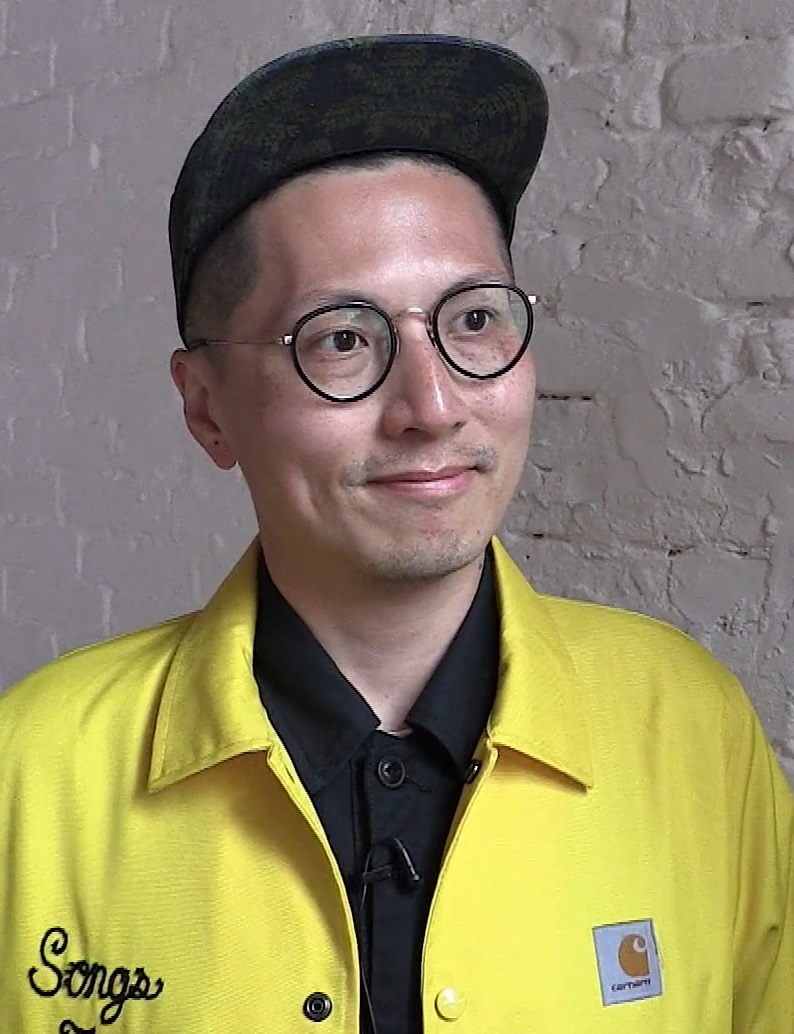
Samson Young, Songs for Disaster Relief, Hong Kong in Venice 2017

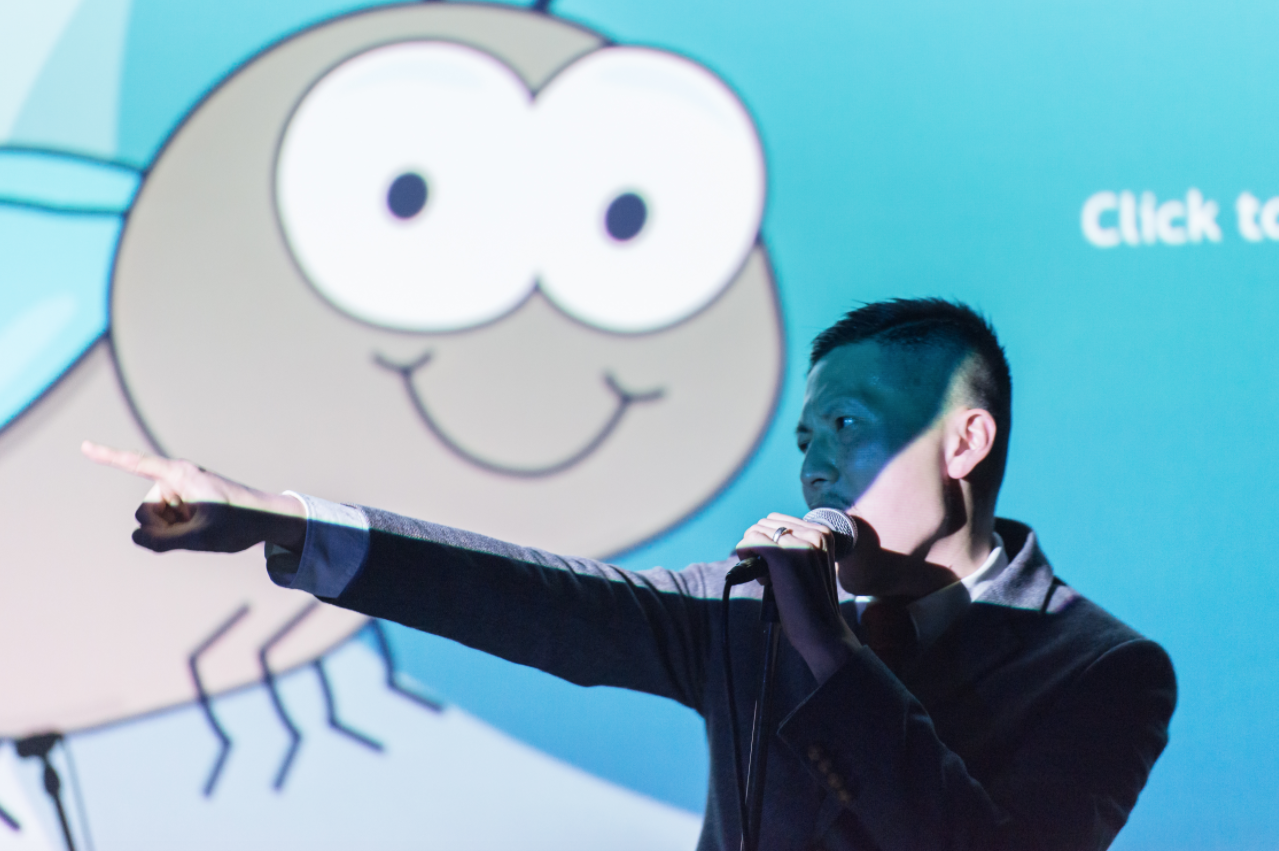
Samson Young performing at the Venice Biennale, 2017.

Samson Young (born 1979) is a Hong Kong artist, working primarily in the mediums of sound performance and installations.

== Early life and education ==
Samson Young was born in Hong Kong. He received both his BA degree in Music, Philosophy and Gender Studies and his M.Phil in Music Composition from the University of Hong Kong, and his PhD in Music Composition from Princeton University in 2013.

He was an assistant professor in sonic art and physical computing at the School of Creative Media, City University of Hong Kong. Young is also the principal investigator at the Laboratory for Ubiquitous Musical Expression (L.U.M.E), and artistic director of the experimental sound advocacy organization Contemporary Musiking.

== Work ==
While Young's background is in music composition, his work as an artist spans a broad range of media, including performance, sound, video, drawing, and wall transfers. Young's work is frequently political in nature, addressing military history and the British occupation of Hong Kong as subjects.

Nocturnal Music, his 2015 exhibition at Team Gallery, centered on a performance in which he sat at a desk for six hours every day, watching muted video footage of night-time airstrikes by the United States on the Middle East and re-creating the audio via foley effects, which he broadcast locally via a pirate FM radio channel.

Major exhibitions include A Dark Theme Keeps Me Here; I'll Play a Broken Music, at Kunsthalle Düsseldorf in 2017, Songs for Disaster Relief at the Hong Kong pavilion at the 57th Venice Biennale 2017, and The Immortals at the Performa 19 festival in New York 2019.

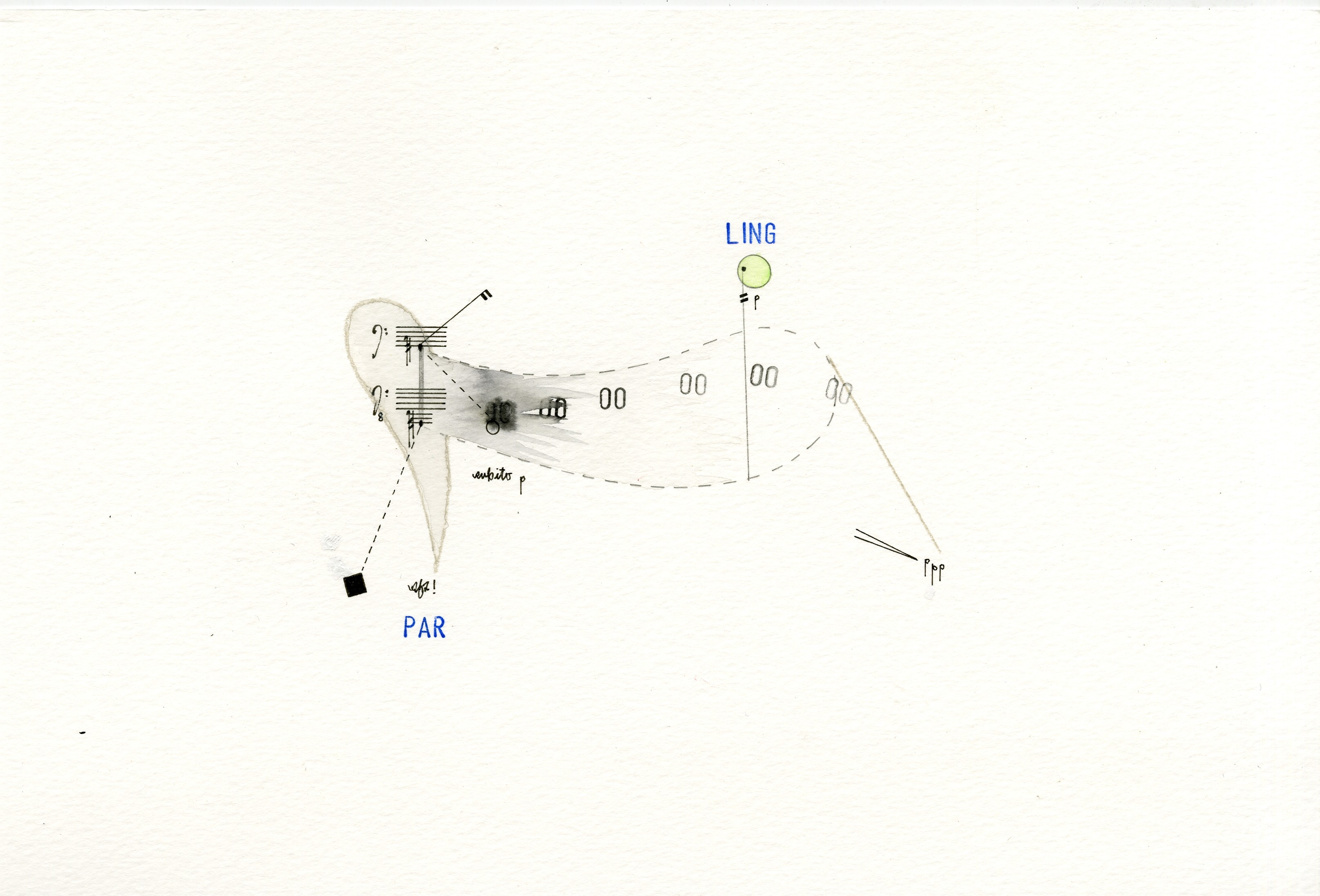
A 2015 drawing by Samson Young.

== Recognition ==
In 2015, Young was the inaugural recipient of the BMW Art Journey Award. He received the Hong Kong Arts Centre Honorary Fellowship in 2018.

== Selected exhibitions ==
- 2011 – Machines for Making Nothing, Brown University Cogut Center for Humanities
- 2013 – On the Musically Beautiful, Goethe-Institut Hong Kong
- 2014 – I wanted to see everything: the Liquid Borders Project, a.m. space
- 2015 – MTVs, a.m. space
- 2015 – Pastoral Music, Discovery, Art Basel Hong Kong
- 2015 – Avant-garde on speed, TKG+
- 2015 – Video Program, Hiroshima City Museum of Contemporary Art
- 2015 – Pastoral Music, Team Gallery
- 2016 – Orchestrations, Connecting Space/Para Site
- 2016 – The Mastery of Language Affords Remarkable Power, Experimenter Gallery
- 2016 – A Dark Theme Keeps Me Here; I'll Make A Broken Music, Kunsthalle Düsseldorf
- 2017 – Songs for Disaster Relief, Venice Biennale Hong Kong Pavilion
- 2017 – Furniture Music, Galerie Gisela Capitain
- 2018 – Songs for Disaster Relief World Tour, M+ Pavilion
- 2019 – It's a heaven over there, Centre A
- 2020 – Muted Tchaikovsky’s 5th, Mori Art Museum
- 2021 – The World Falls Apart Into Facts, Ota Fine Arts
- 2022 – Sonata for Smoke, Saint Louis Art Museum
- 2024 – Seeing Sound, Pratt Manhattan Gallery

== Awards ==
- 2007 - Hong Kong Youth Arts Foundation Bloomberg Emerging Artist
- 2009 - Society for New Music Brian Israel Prize
- 2012 - Japan Media Arts Festival Interactive Art Jury Selection
- 2012 - Prix Ars Electronica for Digital Musics & Sound Art Honorary Mention
- 2012 - Hong Kong Arts Development Council Artist of the Year in Media Arts
- 2015 - Art Basel BMW Art Journey Award
- 2018 - Hong Kong Arts Centre Honorary Fellowship
- 2019 - Prix Ars Electronica for Digital Musics & Sound Art Award of Distinction
