= KHOJ (arts organization) =

India-based arts organization

Khoj International Artists' Association, also known as Khoj, is a non-profit contemporary arts organisation established to incubate emerging, experimental and transdisciplinary creative practices and pedagogies in South Asia. It is based out of New Delhi, India. Khoj was founded in 1997 by artists like Anita Dube, Subodh Gupta, Bharti Kher, Manisha Parekh and Pooja Sood, who is also currently its director. The studio premises are located in Malviya Nagar in Delhi.

== History ==
Khoj started as an annual workshop in 1997 founded by Ajay Desai, Anita Dube, Bharti Kher, Subodh Gupta, Prithpal Singh Ladi, Manisha Parekh and Pooja Sood, collectively known as the 'working group'. Led by artists, it was an initiative for artists by artists. With a non-Euro-American approach in its cultural discourse of art, Khoj started as a platform for dialogues within art from South Asian, Latin American and African countries. The cooperative structure of Khoj is modelled on various workshops held in the UK and Africa which were supported and guided by the Triangle Arts Trust, based in London.

The first international workshop, coordinated by Ajay Desai, took place in 1997 with twenty-two artists from India and countries like Cuba, Kenya, Namibia, Austria, Australia, United Kingdom, South Africa, Pakistan and Sri Lanka. Supported and guided by Robert Loder of Triangle Arts Trust, Dayawati Modi Foundation and Eicher Gallery, Delhi, the two-week workshop took place in Sikribagh, situated on the edges of Modinagar, an industrial town north of Delhi, which remained its venue for the annual workshops for the next five years. In India, when art was still reserved for the institutional confines of galleries, Khoj 1999 workshop produced some new language with performance art by artists like Subodh Gupta from India, Michael Shaonawasai from Thailand and Song Dong from China.

Known for providing an alternate forum for experimentation outside of institutional frameworks, Khoj started first of its kind, 'itinerant' workshops. The first 'itinerant' workshop was held in Mysore, Karnataka in 2002 which was followed by Khoj Mumbai in 2005 and Khoj Kolkata in 2006. These workshops were organised by artists who had experienced Khoj workshops earlier. In 2007, Khoj organised Khoj Kasheer in Lalmandi, Srinagar, the first international art project to be held in Kashmir since 1947.

With the help of Robert Loder, Khoj set up its studio building in Khirkee Village, near Malviya Nagar, New Delhi in 2002.

== Khoj Studios ==
Khoj has been a catalyst in initiating and facilitating network among different communities of artists in India and South Asia. South Asia Network for the Arts (SANA), started in 2000 is one such network that was facilitated and initiated by Khoj, which in turn has spearheaded dialogues and interactions of ideas and work across different artists, geographies and cultures. As a result, Khoj has helped in setting up of studios in Karachi, Pakistan (Vasl), Colombo, Sri Lanka (Theertha), Dhaka, Bangladesh (Britto) and Kathmandu, Nepal(Sutra).

== Workshops and Residencies ==
- International Workshops: Organised by artists, this annual workshop brings together over 20 artists from all over the world to share their diverse cultures and experiences.
- International Residencies: Initiated by Khoj Delhi in 2000 and is held on a regular basis at the Khoj studios.
- Peers: An annual student residency started in 2003 with help of India Foundation for Arts (IFA), Bangalore.
- Associate residencies: Annual Residency featuring various individual artists and collective.
- Curatorial Residency: A residency programme as a part of the four-year Curatorships Programme conceptualised by India Foundation for the Arts (IFA).
