= CAMP (studio) =

Indian media studio

- Website: https://studio.camp

CAMP is a Mumbai-based studio for transdisciplinary media practices founded by Shaina Anand (born 1975 in Mumbai, India), Sanjay Banghar, and Ashok Sukumaran (born 1974 in Sapporo, Japan). CAMP's work has been concerned with the history and politics of technology and experimental video and audio.

CAMP's work has been exhibited internationally, including at the 2009, 20011 and the 2013 Sharjah Biennials, the 2012 New Museum Triennial, Documenta 13 in Kassel and Kabul, the 2013 edition of the Viennale, the 2014 edition of the Shanghai Biennale, the 2017 edition of the Skulptur Projekte Münster, the 2012 and 2022 Kochi Muziris Biennale, and in the Museum of Modern Art (MoMA) of New York, in 2025, with a monographic show titled Video After Video: The Critical Media of CAMP.

== History ==
CAMP was founded in Mumbai in 2007 by Shaina Anand, Sanjay Banghar, and Ashok Sukumaran.

Shaina Anand was born in 1975 in Mumbai, India. She received a BA in History from RD National College in Mumbai and attended an MFA in Film and Media Arts at Temple University. Prior to co-founding CAMP, Anand founded http://ChitraKarKhana.net, a media production unit based in Mumbai.

Ashok Sukumaran was born in 1974 in Sapporo, Japan. He holds a bachelor's degree in Architecture from the School of Planning and Architecture in New Delhi, India and an MFA from the Department of Design/Media Arts from the University of California, Los Angeles.

CAMP has also had other members over the years, including Hakimuddin Liliyawala, Iyesha Geeth Abbas, Nida Ghouse, Zinnia Ambapardiwala, Simpreet Singh, Jan Gerber and Rohan Chavan.

In 2008, CAMP co-initiated https://Pad.ma, short for Public Access Digital Media Archive, an online archive of annotated video material, and in 2013 co-initiated https://indiancine.ma, the online database and archive for Indian Cinema. They also run https://Phantas.ma. In 2020, they were awarded the 7th Nam June Paik Art Center Prize.
