= Soumya Sankar Bose =

Indian documentary photographer

- Born: 1990 (age 35–36); Midnapore, India
- Occupation: Photographer
- Years active: 2010-present
- Known for: Portrait, Documentary photography
- Notable work: The Former Heroes of Jatra; Full Moon On a Dark night
- Awards: The Louis Roederer Discovery Public Award, Rencontres d'Arles 2023; Magnum Foundation's Migration and Religion Grant; India Foundation For the Arts Grant 2015 & 17; HELLO! India Art Award 2023
- Website: www.soumyasankarbose.in

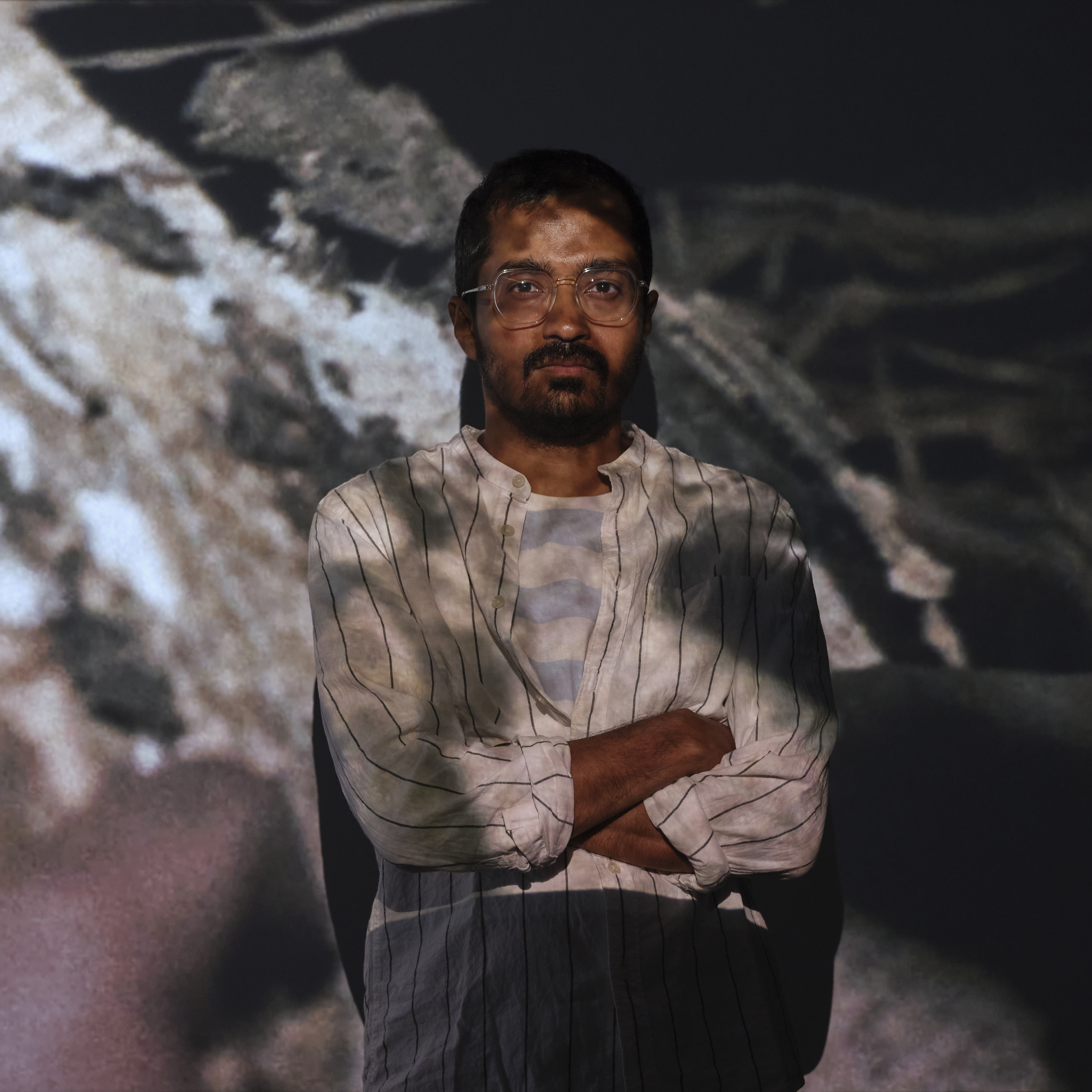
Bose in 2024

Soumya Sankar Bose is an Indian documentary photographer, filmmaker and artist. In his practice he uses photography, archival material and text to explore desire, identity and memory. His first book 'Where the Birds Never Sing(2020)' is on Marichjhapi massacre, the forcible eviction in 1979 of lower caste Bengali refugees on Marichjhapi Island in Sundarban, India, and the subsequent death of thousands by police gunfire, starvation, and disease. The Book was shortlisted for the First Photobook award in the Paris Photo–Aperture Foundation PhotoBook Awards 2020. Soumya Sanker Bose was awarded Magnum Foundation's Social Justice Fellowship for Full Moon on a Dark Night in 2017, was Hello! India's Emerging Artist of the Year in 2023, and received the Louis Roederer Discovery Public Award at Les Rencontres d'Arles for A Discreet Exit Through Darkness in 2023.

== Life and work ==
Soumya Sankar Bose is an independent documentary photographer, born and brought up in Midnapore, West Bengal India. His long-term project on retired Jatra (Bengal) artistes had been funded by India Foundation for the Arts. His work has reviewed by The New York Times, The Caravan, The Huffington Post, BBC, The Indian Express, The Telegraph, NPR and many more. Bose has worked on commission for clients including Le Monde, HSBC Bank, Bloomberg Businessweek Magazine, Financial Times, The Neue Zürcher Zeitung, Acumen, The Wall Street Journal etc.

Bose's work "Let's Sing an Old Song" explores concepts of nostalgia, modernity, performativity and the transformation of art in a changing world, his work both creates and documents reality. His portraits of Jatra artists are staged spectacles that evoke not only the tragedy of this waning tradition, but also those of its practitioners. Using photography as a performative medium rather than documentary tool, Bose brings an original approach to an often photographically explored space of dying art form in India.

Immersing the viewer in a surreal universe is crucial to Bose's project "Full moon on a Dark Night." By way of those portraits, Bose conducts a psychological exploration of a community of individuals who have been relentlessly persecuted by society because of their identities and their gender or sexual orientations. The work looks closely at the LGBT community in eastern India through a fantastical lens, often projecting a world devoid of restrictive laws and social taboos that the community regularly comes up against. Other images in the work are responses to these very constraints imposed by the state and society. It is here that Bose makes use of visual metaphors—a gas mask, a tiger in the wild, a choppy sea engulfing a man struggling against the current—to evoke notions of censorship and surveillance and feelings of suffocation and anxiety.

Soumya Sankar Bose's project Where The Birds Never Sing (2017-2020) brought together Bose's long-term project on the Marichjhapi massacre, the forcible eviction in 1979 of Bengali lower caste refugees from the Marichjhapi Island in Sundarbans, West Bengal, India and the subsequent death of thousands by police gunfire, starvation, and disease. Experimenter Outpost takes this project back to Kumirmari, Sundarbans, near the Marichjhapi island through a series of enlarged reproductions of Bose's images that mark the landscape. The images become sentinels, standing as silent witnesses of unspeakable atrocities committed over forty years ago, on a land that whispered into Bose's ears incredible stories of loss, memory and the complex political history it represents.

Bose's latest project A Discreet Exit Through Darkness (2020-2022) is a VR360 film inspired by the mystery of his mother going missing for three years at the age of nine. Narrated by Bose's reimagined grandfather, the work transports the viewer deep into the psyche of a protracted, devastating search in 1969 Midnapore. The film, A Discreet Exit through Darkness, is the first virtual reality (VR), non-animated feature-length film to be ever made and explores a technology that soon promises to be a segue into the imminent metaverse.

Things We Lost Last Night (2024) is a three-channel film and the companion piece to A Discreet Exit Through Darkness, forming the second chapter of Bose's project on his mother's disappearance. Where the earlier VR film is narrated through his grandfather's search, this film speculates on the missing girl's own journey through the interior monologue of the woman she grew up to become, weaving together a fragmented account of unrest, belief and imagination. Bose's mother lives with prosopagnosia, or face blindness, and has never been able to fully recount what happened to her during the three years she was missing. The film draws on scattered entries from her diary alongside episodes of the social unrest that gripped West Bengal through the 1960s and 70s, material Bose gathered from archival newspapers during a 2022 residency at the Delfina Foundation. Across the accompanying photobook, Bose leaves no image of his mother in the frame; her absence is instead built up through surrounding objects and recurring motifs, including a shrivelled navel that dissolves into ripples in a pond as the book turns from the grandfather's account to hers. The film premiered at the Delfina Foundation, London, as part of Bose's first international solo exhibition, Braiding Dusk and Dawn (2024).

We Need to Talk in Whispers (2024–2026) began after Bose found a diary left behind by a stranger on an overnight train from Howrah to Koraput. The diary belonged to a woman named Brinni and held a private record of suicide notes and memories held onto by people in their final moments. Rather than illustrate the diary's notes directly, Bose traced the real locations and stories behind them, travelling to Joshimath in Uttarakhand, Benaras in Uttar Pradesh, and Darjeeling, Shantiniketan and Digha in West Bengal, building an alternative archive out of newspaper clippings, court records, oral memory and photographs of the empty hotel rooms, staircases and shorelines connected to each case. Each case is given its own distinct visual language: still lifes of a disappeared man's belongings, negative images layered over childhood memories, or a suicide seen only through the averted gaze of a witness who will not look directly at it, and the diary's author is represented within the installation as an LLM built from her writing. The work premiered as Bose's fifth solo exhibition at Experimenter, Kolkata, in 2026.

== Publications ==
- A Discreet Exit Through Darkness & Things We Lost Last Night Kolkata: Mandas and Red Turtle Photobook, 2025. ISBN 978-81-976080-1-8. Edition of 500 copies.
- Where the Birds Never Sing Kolkata: self-published (Red Turtle Photobook), 2020. ISBN 978-1-5136-6415-6. Edition of 600 copies.
- Let's sing an old song Kolkata: self-published (Red Turtle Photobook), 2021. ISBN 978-1-5136-8884-8. Edition of 500 copies.

== Awards and fellowships ==
- 2024- The Artistic chair at the Institut d'études avancées de Nantes, France.
- 2023- The Louis Roederer Discovery Public Award, Rencontres d'Arles.
- 2018- Magnum Foundation & Henry Luce Foundation's Migration & Religion grant.
- 2017- Magnum Foundation's Photography and Social Justice Fellowship.
