= Yamini Nayar =

Indian-American visual artist

Yamini Nayar (born 1975) is a visual artist working between New York and Delhi. Her work is part of the collection of the Guggenheim Museum in New York City, the Cincinnati Art Museum, the Saatchi Collection, Queensland Art Gallery, the Art Institute of Chicago, and the US Department of State Art in Embassies collection.

== Education ==
Nayar received her MFA from the School of Visual Arts in New York City. and her BFA from the Rhode Island School of Design in Rhode Island. Nayar is a recipient of the Lightborne Fellowship, Aaron Siskind Fellowship and an Art Matters Foundation grant.

== Works ==
Nayor creates large-scale photographs from sculptures constructed from found materials. After the construction is documented with a large-format camera, they are destroyed leaving only the photographic evidence. Her works intersect photography, sculpture and architecture, with projects exploring postcolonial narratives, memory, migration, informal architecture and dwellings, modernist architecture, and alternate and imagined modernities. She has been likened to a "tripped-out version of Samuel van Hoogstraten" and also compared to German artist Thomas Demand.

Nayar's work has been reviewed in the New York Times, the New Yorker, the Hindu, and Artforum. Her work has been described both as exhibiting "a painstaking attention to detail" in certain pieces, and in others portraying a "sense of chaos." Nayar's photographs are as much about the psychological as physical space. Her work explores the "relationship between memory and architecture while establishing a tension between the remembered and the real." Her photographs have been described as providing "a topography of the mind itself."

Nayar's more recent work blends multiple exposures from various stages of construction of a single model. This technique deepens and complicates the piece's relationship with time. The combination is also said to be “reminiscent of Cubism's multi-perspectival dissolution of the static object.”

== Selected exhibitions ==
2020

THREE SPACES for TIME, Thomas Erben, New York

2019

If stone could give, Gallery Wendi Norris, San Francisco

2018

Peckham 24, London

What's essential, Jahaveri Contemporary

Aspirational Architectures, Fridman Galley

2017

Crash, Dig, Dwell, Jahaveri Contemporary

Archival Alchemy, Abrons Arts Center

2016

Unsuspending Disbelief, Logan Center Gallery

2015

Constructs/Construction, Kiran Nadar Museum of Art

A Room of One's Own, Yancy Richardson

2013

an axe for a wingbone, Thomas Erben, New York

2011

Thomas Erben Gallery, NY

2010

Lightborne Exhibition, Cincinnati Art Museum and Art Academy of Cincinnati

2011

School of Visual Arts, SVA Notable Female Alumni

Collectors Guide, Volume 2, Chelsea Art Museum

Moving Index, ArtOffice.org

Manual For Treason, Sharjah Biennial

2010

Object Lessons, New York Photography Festival

The Empire Strikes Back: Indian Art Today, Saatchi Gallery, London, UK

Conspiracy’ with Raqs Media Collective and Susanta Mandal, Experimenter Gallery, Kolkata, India

Hong Kong Art fair, Hong Kong, Japan

Punctum II, Lakeeren Gallery, Mumbai, India

31 Women in Art Photography, Humble Arts Foundation

Bring Me A Lion, Webster University, MO

Accented, Bric Rotunda Gallery, Brooklyn, NY

2009

NADA Art Fair, Yamini Nayar, New Works

Thomas Erben Gallery, NY, Arrested Views

Galerie Anne Barrault, France

Grey Noise Gallery, Pakistan, Good Looking

2008

Scope Basel, Basel, Switzerland, By All Means

Stephen Stux Gallery, New York, Firewalkers

Art and Culture Center of Hollywood, FA, Exploding the Lotus

Thomas Erben, New York, First Left, Second Right

ExitArt, New York, Spring Auction

2007

ExitArt, New York, Sultana's Dream

Gallerie Barry Keldoulis, Australia, The Devotee Exhausts the Forces of Activity

Rush Arts Gallery, New York – Art for Life Auction – East Hampton Benefit

Queens Museum, New York, Erasing Borders

2006

Bose Pacia Modern, New York ‘Yamini Nayar and Shreshta Premnath’

Onishi Gallery, New York, The Kayu Project

Kiana Malakzadeh Gallery, New York, This One Time

BosePacia (25), New York, Friends of Fulbright India Auction

2005

Queens Museum of Art, New York Fatal Love: South Asian American Art Now

Prerana Reddy

Rush Arts Gallery, New York, More or Less, Generation Meaning Through Process

Studio Museum of Harlem, NY hrlm: pictures – video installation;

PH Gallery, New York, Empire's Feast

2004

Gallery Arts India, New York, Territories

PS 122, NY, 'Blow the Conch

2003

Bose Pacia, New York, Through Customs

Rye Center, New York

2002

313 Gallery, New York, Black Tea

Interart Annex, New York, Women in Wartime

Society for Ethical Culture, New York

1999

Woods-Gerry Gallery, RI RISD Graduation Invitational

RISD Red-Eye Gallery, RI, Thesis Exhibition, Detroit
