= Ashok Sukumaran =

Indian artist

Ashok Sukumaran is a Japanese-born Indian contemporary artist.

== Biography ==
Sukumaran was born to a Japanese mother and an Indian Malayalee father in Sapporo, Japan in 1974. Sukumaran grew up in Shimla and did his schooling from St. Edward's School, Shimla.

Sukumaran is a trained architect with a degree from School of Planning and Architecture, Delhi, India. He holds an MFA from Department of Design Media Arts at the University of California, Los Angeles. He is the co-founder of the collaborative studio CAMP, (along with Shaina Anand) based in Mumbai.

== Artistic approach ==
Sukumaran practices media art using a variety of media to convey complex ideas around public and private, and technology and society.

"Ashok's recent work examines possibilities between human habitat and "embedded" technologies: the physical and social sites of digital media. In adopting the view that many new-media technologies are not fundamentally new, his projects often imagine "what could have been" across the disciplines of interactive art, early and pre-cinema, and architecture."

"My recent work deals with the intersection of human habitat and technologies being 'embedded' within it. These are concerns about how technologies sit on the ground, what patterns they establish, and how we may move between them. The technologies themselves may range from electricity to imaging technologies or wirelessness, for example. I am interested in how we collectively 'see' them, and negotiate the property boundaries, systems administrators, and thresholds of understanding inscribed within." (Artist's personal statement)

== Professional ==
He was the Sun artist in residence for 2006.

He showcased his art in the Singapore Biennial 2006.

== Awards ==
- Nam June Paik Art Center Prize – 2020 "CAMP"
- Golden Nica-interactive art Ars Electronica 2007 – "Park View Hotel"
- First Prize for the UNESCO Digital Arts Award 2005 – "City and Media".
- Honorary Mention Ars Electronica- interactive art – "Glow Positioning System" 2005
- 2003 David Bermant Foundation Award
- Grand prize in the Samsung Art and Design Institute's competition for 2002
- Universal Warning Sign Design Exhibition – First Prize – Yucca Mountain
