= Subodh Gupta =

Indian artist (born 1964)

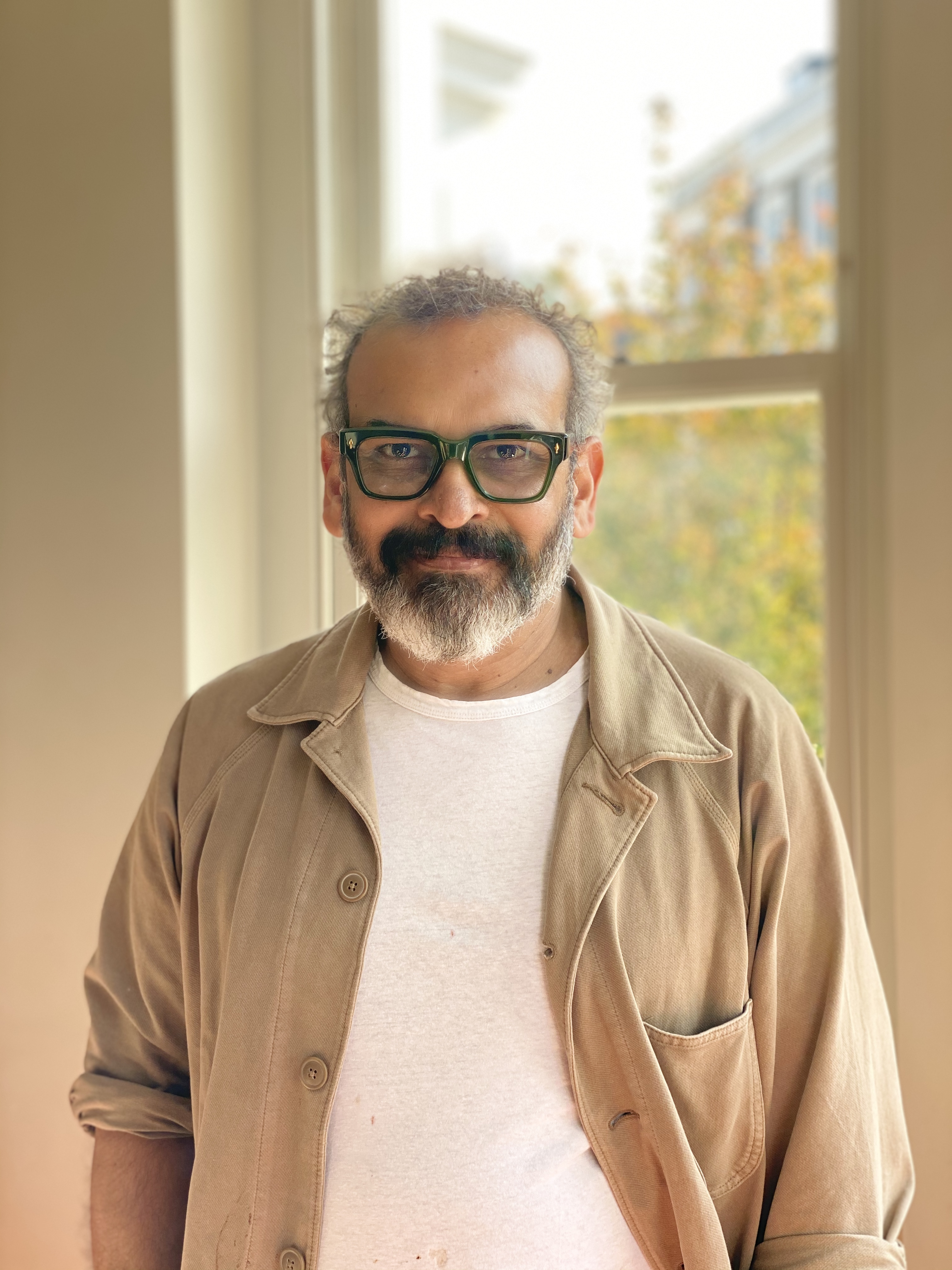
- Gupta in September 2020
- Born: Khagaul, Bihar, India
- Occupation: Artist
- Spouse: Bharti Kher
- Website: instagram.com/subodhguptastudio

Subodh Gupta (born 1964) is an Indian contemporary artist based in New Delhi. His work encompasses sculpture, installation, painting, photography, performance and video.

== Early life and education ==
Gupta was born in Khagaul, a small town in Bihar. His father, a railway guard, died in his early forties, when Gupta was 12 years old; his mother, who came from a farming family, sent Gupta to live with his brother for a few years in a remote village. Of his years there, Gupta said, "Not a single school kid wore shoes, and there was no road to go to school. Sometimes we stopped in the field and we sat down and ate green chickpeas before we went to school." On finishing school, Gupta joined a small theatre group in Khagaul, where he worked as an actor. He also designed posters to advertise the plays he acted in, which is around the time he started considering a career in art. He worked part-time as an illustrator at a newspaper while studying at the College of Arts & Crafts, Patna between 1983 and 1988. Of his time studying art in Patna, Gupta has said, "“Can you imagine the library of an art college forever locked? I just felt so lost when I passed out of the college. Had there been proper infrastructure in the college, I feel I wouldn’t have had to experience the same kind of struggle."

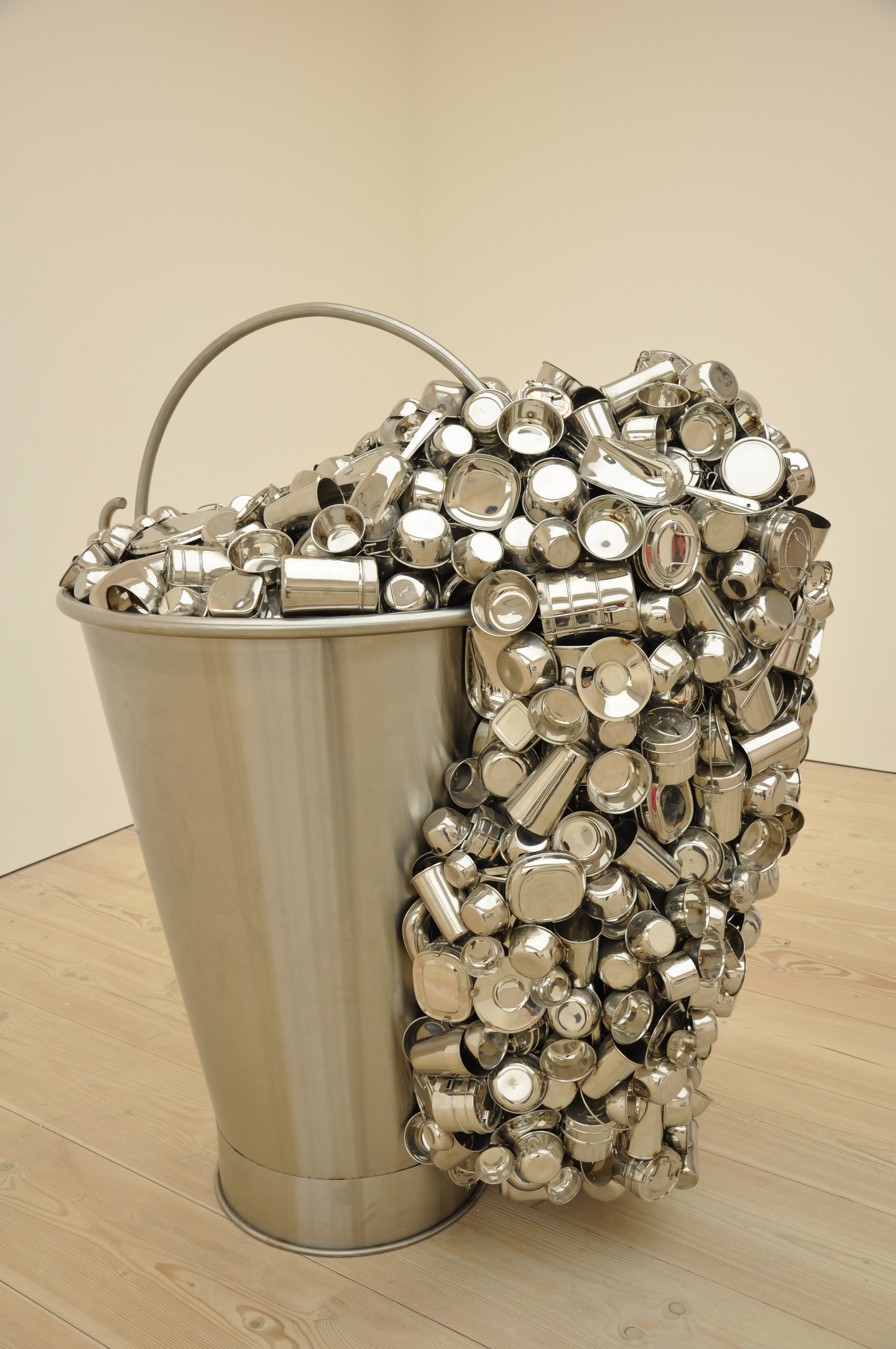
Subodh Gupta, Spill, 2007

Gupta moved to Delhi after graduating, and struggled for several years. Early turning points in his career came from being exhibited at the Fukuoka Asian Art Triennale held at the Fukuoka Art Museum in 1999, and at the Gwangju Biennale in 2000. His association with Khoj Studios in Delhi, an organisation that promotes young artists and experimental work, begun in this period, also influenced his career. His work has been described as being in the tradition of the French surrealist Marcel Duchamp.

== Career ==
In 2002, Gupta, still relatively unknown, exhibited at the Armory Show in New York, where his gallerist said "Nobody was impressed, nobody was looking at the work." He followed this with showings at Frieze in 2005 and Art Basel in 2006.

In 2006, the French art collector and businessman François Pinault bought Gupta's sculpture Very Hungry God, a giant skull made from aluminium kitchen utensils, weighing over 1000 kilograms. Gupta is currently among the most valuable Indian artists, routinely featuring in lists of the most expensive contemporary artists from India. While his work has been increasingly appreciated around the world, it has also attracted criticism for being repetitive.

Gupta is primarily represented by two art galleries, Nature Morte, and Hauser & Wirth.

In February 2020, the owner of an anonymous Instagram handle who alleged sexual misconduct on the part of the artist apologised to Gupta, in response to a defamation lawsuit filed against them, and withdrew the defamatory content posted.

== Work ==
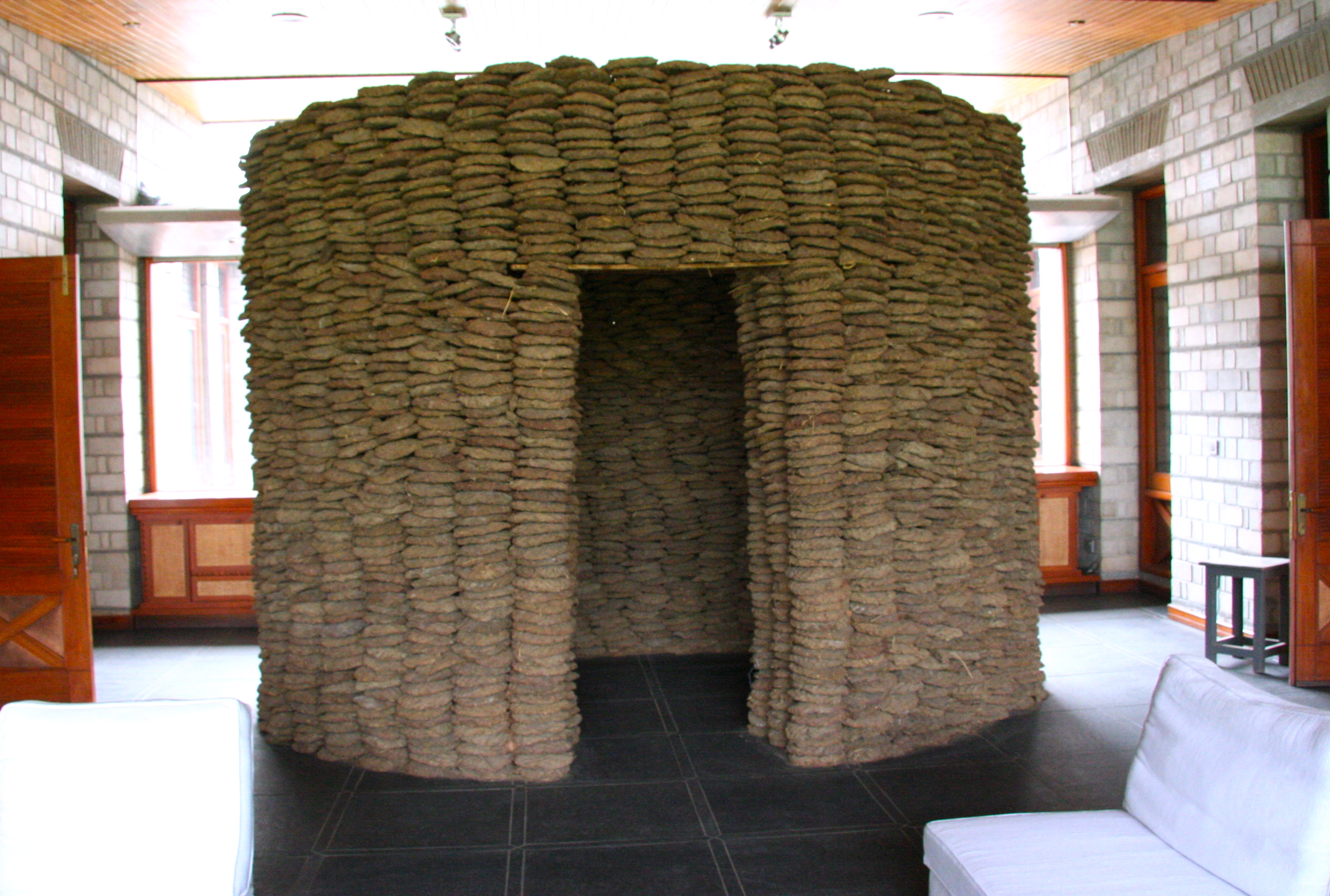
Subodh Gupta, My Mother and Me, 1997

Gupta is best known for incorporating everyday objects that are ubiquitous throughout India, such as the steel tiffin boxes used by millions to carry their lunch, as well as thali plates, bicycles, and milk pails. From such ordinary items, Gupta produces sculptures that reflect on the economic transformation of his homeland. Of his practice, he has said, "All these things were part of the way I grew up. They were used in the rituals and ceremonies that were part of my childhood. Indians either remember them from their youth, or they want to remember them." On the symbolism of ritual elements of Hindu life in his work, he says "I am the idol thief. I steal from the drama of Hindu life. And from the kitchen - these pots, they are like stolen gods, smuggled out of the country. Hindu kitchens are as important as prayer rooms."

Several of his works have become significant in their own right.

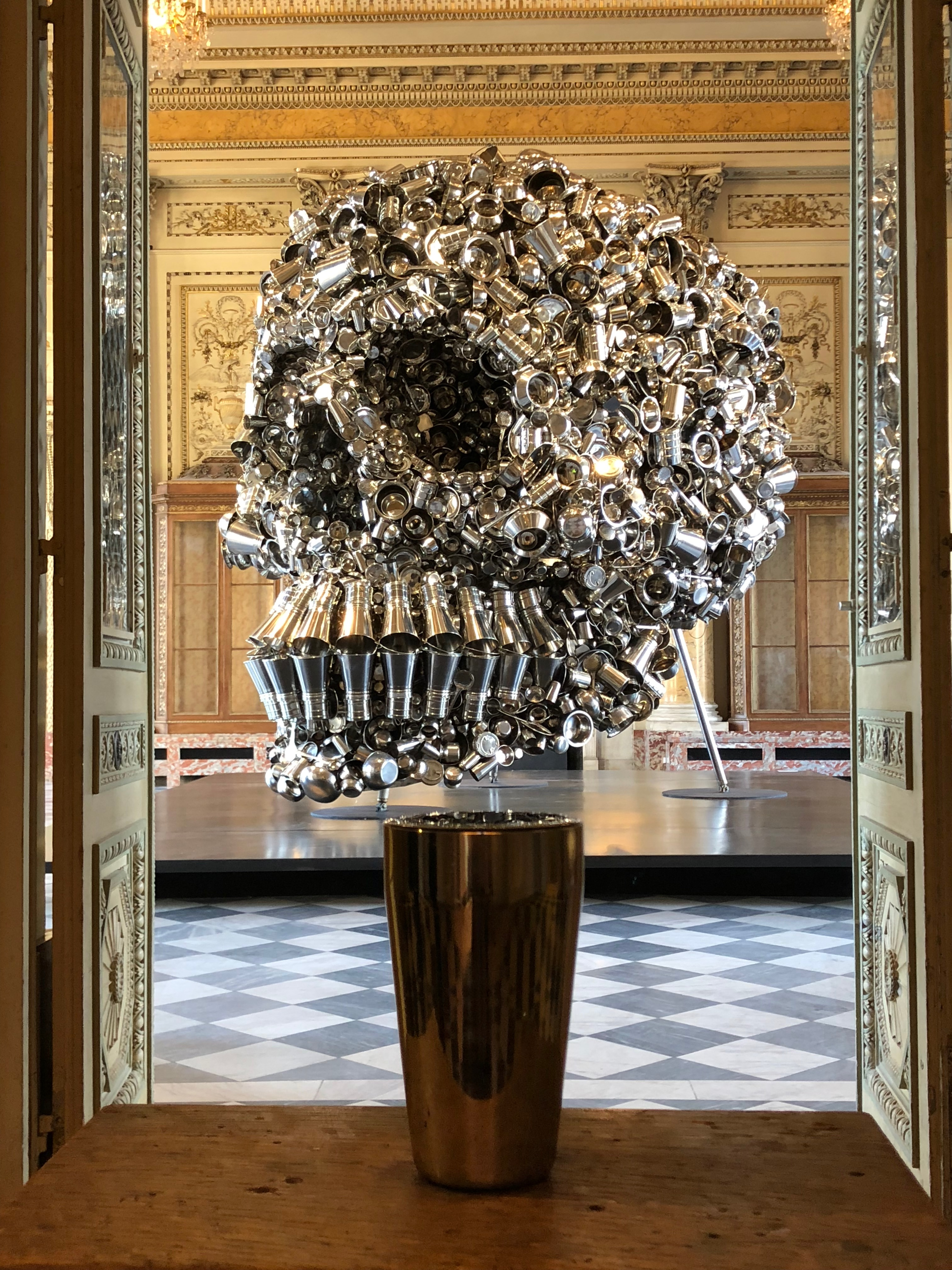
Subodh Gupta, Very Hungry God, 2006

My Mother and Me (1997): Gupta set himself apart from others of his generation by adopting organic materials intrinsic to Indian culture in his work, most notably cowdung. "My Mother and Me" was a cylindrical structure ten feet high made from cowdung with a layer of ash spread across the floor. Originally constructed during a workshop organised by Khoj Studios in Modinagar near Delhi, the work was exhibited during a career retrospective at the National Gallery of Modern Art, New Delhi, in 2014.

Bihari (1999): Gupta addressed his identity and rural roots through a self-portrait enmeshed in cow dung and a single LED-inscribed Devanagiri word, "Bihari," meaning someone from the Indian state of Bihar, a qualifier often used as a slur, owing to the impoverished circumstances of the state, and people from Bihar seeking economic refuge in other parts of India.

Very Hungry God (2006): Gupta's gigantic sculpture of a skull, made from kitchen vessels, was displayed outside François Pinault's Palazzo Grassi, at the 2007 Venice Biennale. "Subodh managed to take a ubiquitous symbol and make it meaningful anew, an enormously difficult task that could only have been accomplished by a consummate artist," wrote Indian art critic Girish Shahane in January 2007.

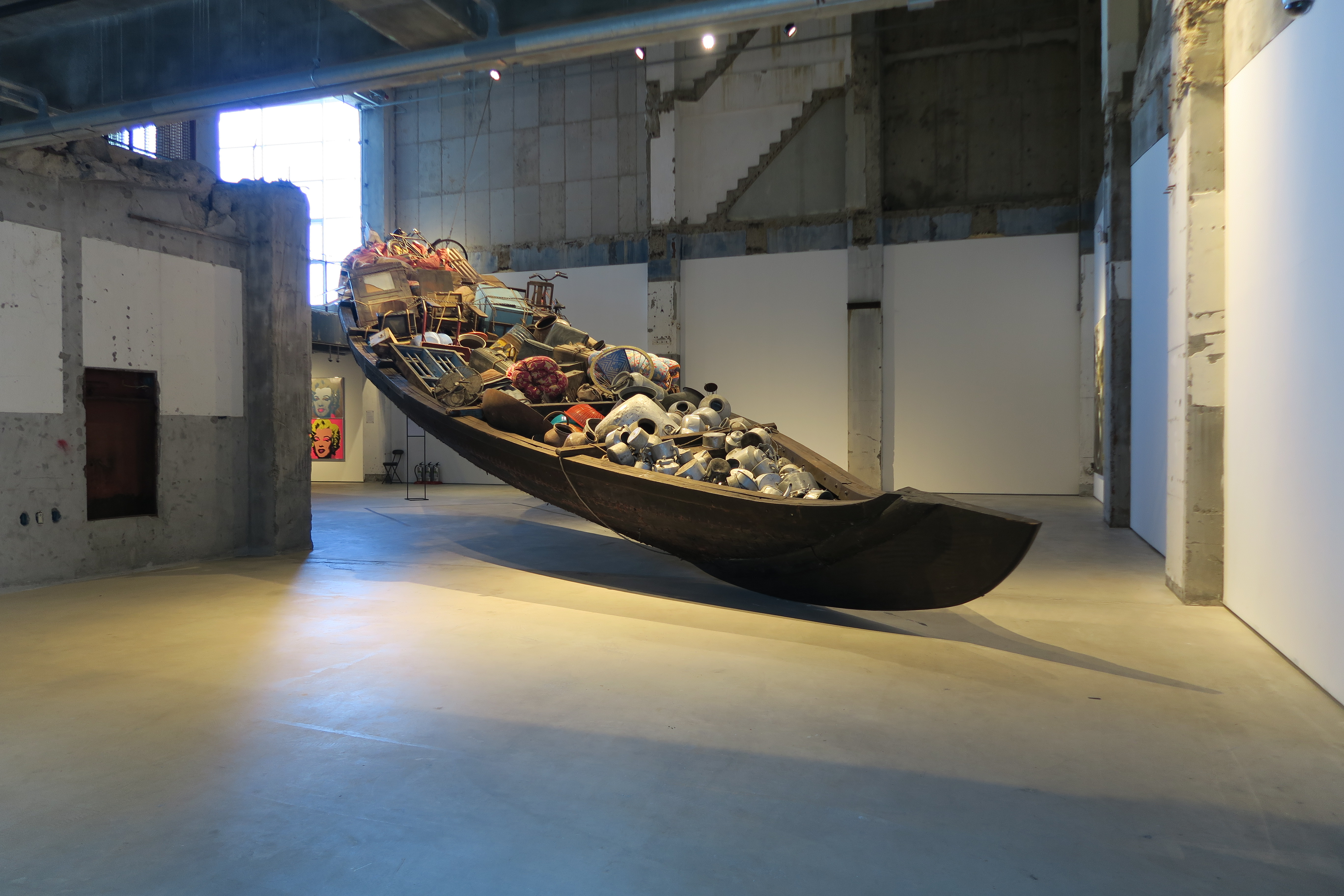
Subodh Gupta, What Does the Vessel Contain, That the River Does Not, 2012

What does the vessel contain, that the river does not (2012): Originally created for the first edition of the Kochi-Muziris Biennale, Gupta's 21.35 m (70.0 ft) long, 3.15 m (10.3 ft) wide, 11 m (36 ft) deep boat was stuffed with a collection of found objects: abandoned chairs, beds, fishing nets and window frames among others. Echoing sentiments of migration, displacement, belonging, movement, and stability, the work took its title from a line in "The Sufi Path of Love" by Persian poet Rumi: "What does the vat contain that is not in the river? / What does the room encompass that is not in the city? / This world is the vat, and the heart the running stream, / this world the room, and the heart the city of wonders."

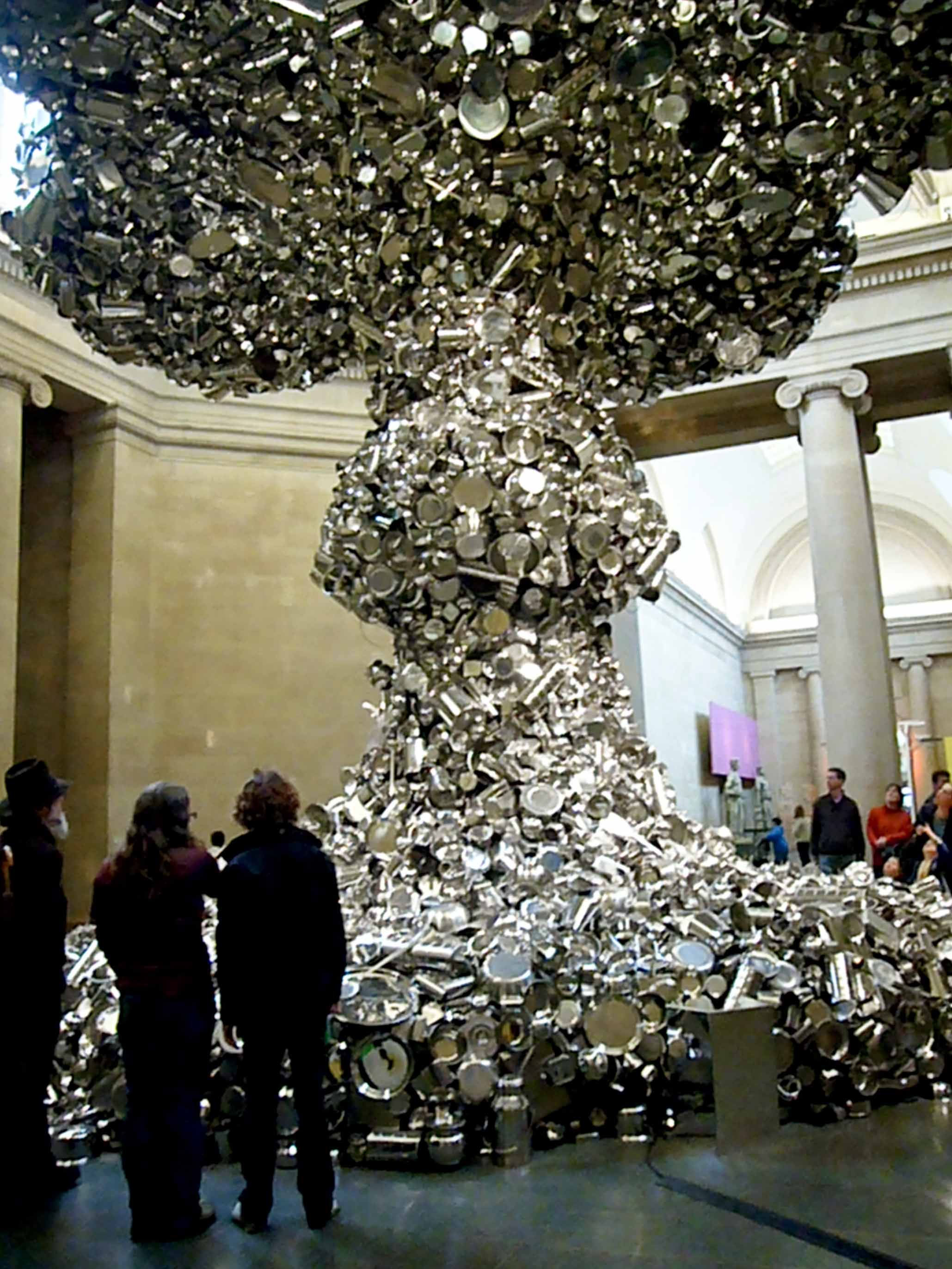
Subodh Gupta, Line of Control, 2008

Gupta's work has been widely exhibited at public museums. One of those works, Line of Control (2008), a mushroom cloud constructed entirely of pots and pans, was shown at the Tate Triennial at Tate Britain in the UK in 2009, and is currently exhibited at the Kiran Nadar Museum of Art in Delhi. Another work, Banyan Tree (2014), a life-size sculpture made from stainless steel, is permanently displayed at the National Gallery of Modern Art in New Delhi. In 2015, Subodh Gupta exhibited his work, ‘When Soak Becomes Spill’, made in India and London, 2015, at the Victoria and Albert Museum, London. In 2018, he had his first retrospective exhibition, Adda / Rendez-vous, in France at the Monnaie de Paris.

Gupta has also created live performance participating in the Performa Biennial in 2013. Celebration, commissioned for the biennial, was a communal Indian feast inside a light filled sculpture. Gupta spent six days preparing for the five course meals that would be served to sixty people.

In 2008, Gupta's oil on canvas work titled Saat Samundar Paar sold for Rs 34 million at a Saffronart auction, the money going to a fund for victims of a catastrophic flood in his home state of Bihar.

== Personal life ==
Gupta lives and works in Gurgaon, outside Delhi, with his wife and two children. He is married to Bharti Kher, also a prominent contemporary Indian artist.
