= Bharti Kher =

British artist (born 1969)

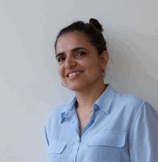
- Born: 1969 (age 56–57); London, England
- Education: Newcastle Polytechnic
- Spouse: Subodh Gupta
- Website: bhartikher.com

Bharti Kher is an Indian contemporary artist. She has worked across painting, sculpture and installation.

== Early life ==
Kher was born in London, England, in 1969. She studied at Middlesex Polytechnic, London, from 1987 to 1988, and then attended the Foundation Course in Art and Design at Newcastle Polytechnic from 1988 to 1991, receiving a BA Honours in Fine Art, Painting. She moved to India in 1993, where she lives and works today.

== Selected works and themes ==
=== Bindi ===
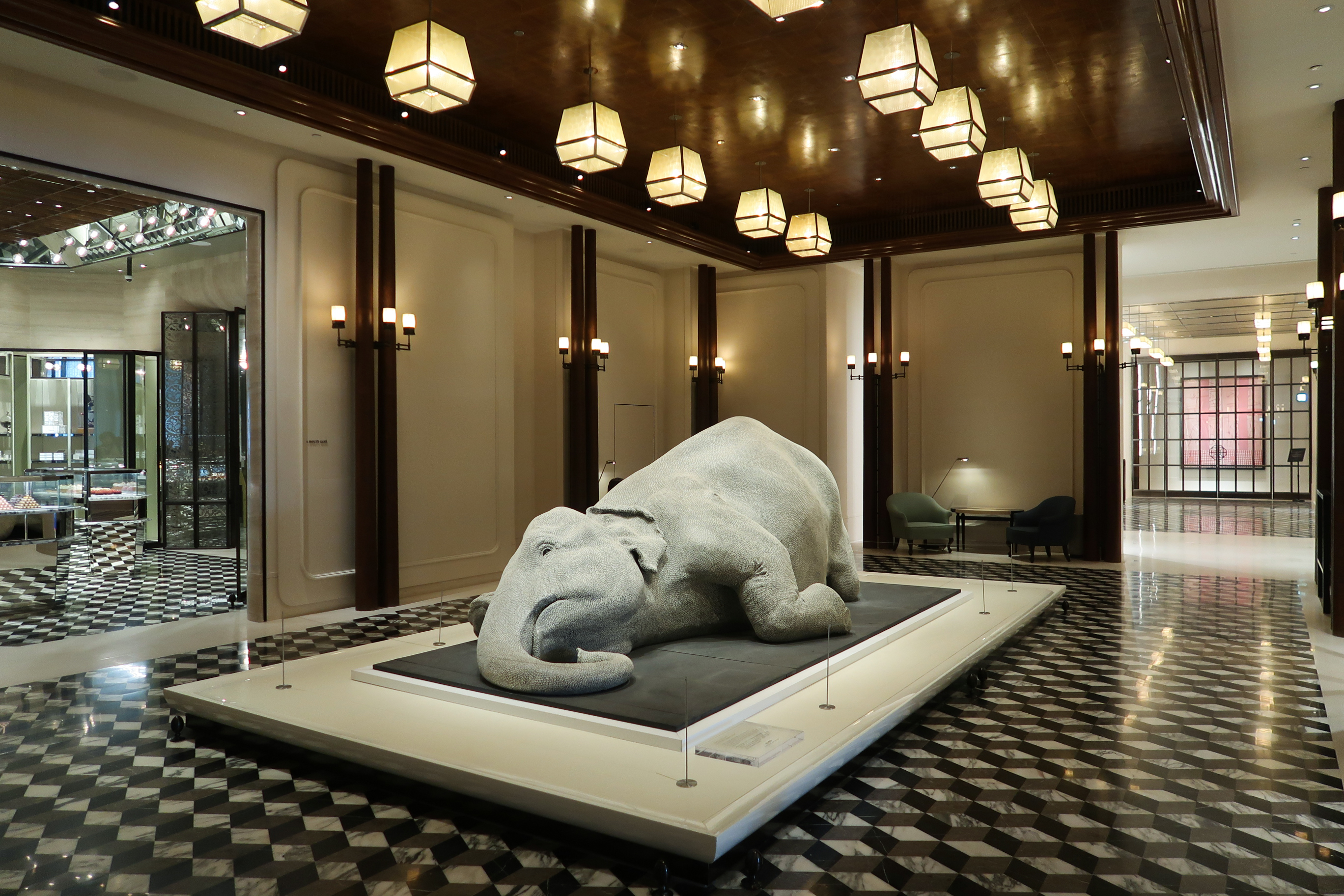
The Skin Speaks a language not its own(2006)

The Skin Speaks a language not its own (2006) is one of her numerous work. It is a sculpture that represents a life size female elephant made from fiberglass and adorned by numerous bindis. This sculpture combine two of the most common symbols of Indian tradition (bindi) and the Hindu religion (the elephant). This sculpture can be seen as the archetype of India.

=== Intermediaries ===
Her "Intermediaries" series is exemplary of the idea of transformation, where the artist collects brightly painted clay figurines traditionally displayed in South India during the autumn festive season, which she shatters and then puts back together in order to create fantastical creatures: animal hybrids, irregular and strange people.

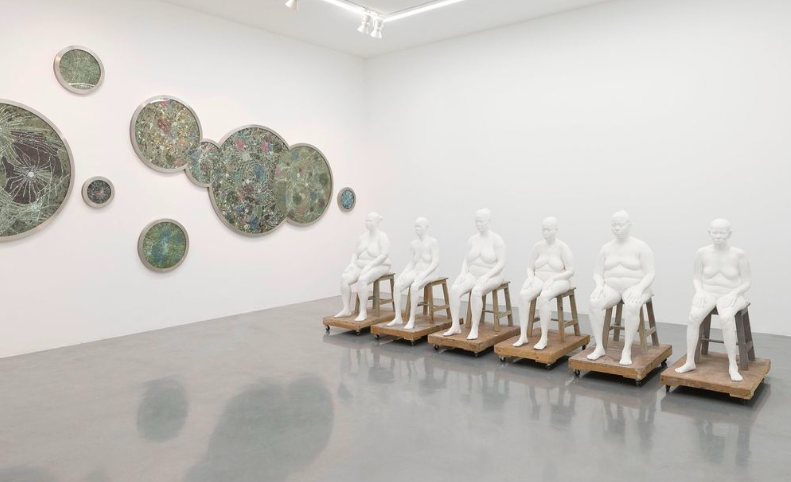

Bharti Kher has worked in a variety of media creating paintings, sculptures, installations, and text. Kher's primary material is manufactured versions of traditional Indian bindi. Throughout her career Kher has kept some repeating patterns in her paintings from her student years from the late 1980s to the early 1990s. Kher considers how the realities of human life is perceived in our current time. Her works displays fondness towards human drama, as well as intrinsic love.

== Exhibitions ==
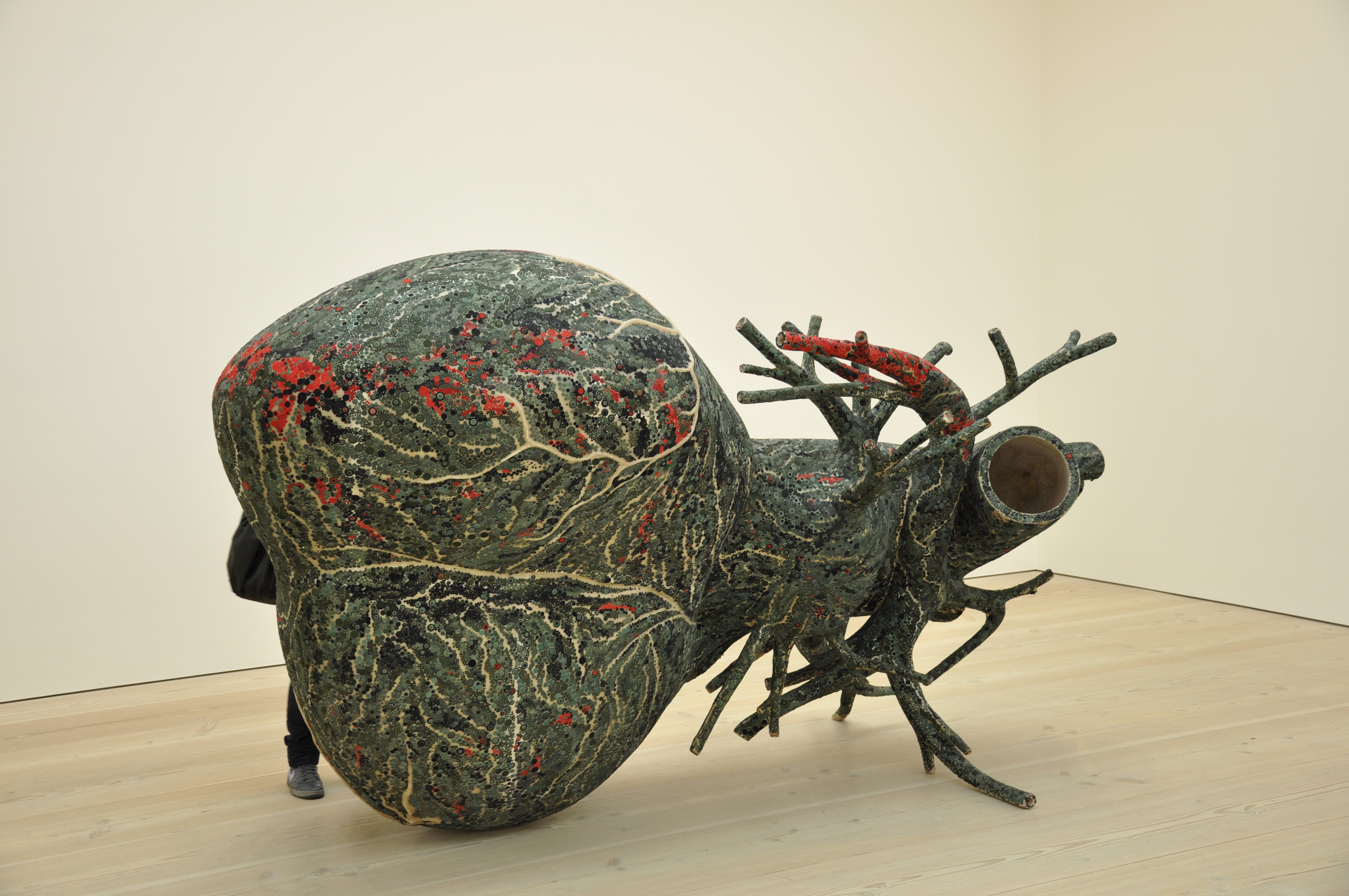
An Absence Of Assignable Cause

- The Body is a Place, Arnolfini, Bristol (2022-23)
- A Consummate Joy, Irish Museum of Modern Art (2020)
- In the Company of Artists, Isabella Stewart Gardner Museum (2019)
- Desire: A revision from the 20th Century to the Digital Age, Irish Museum of Modern Art (2019)

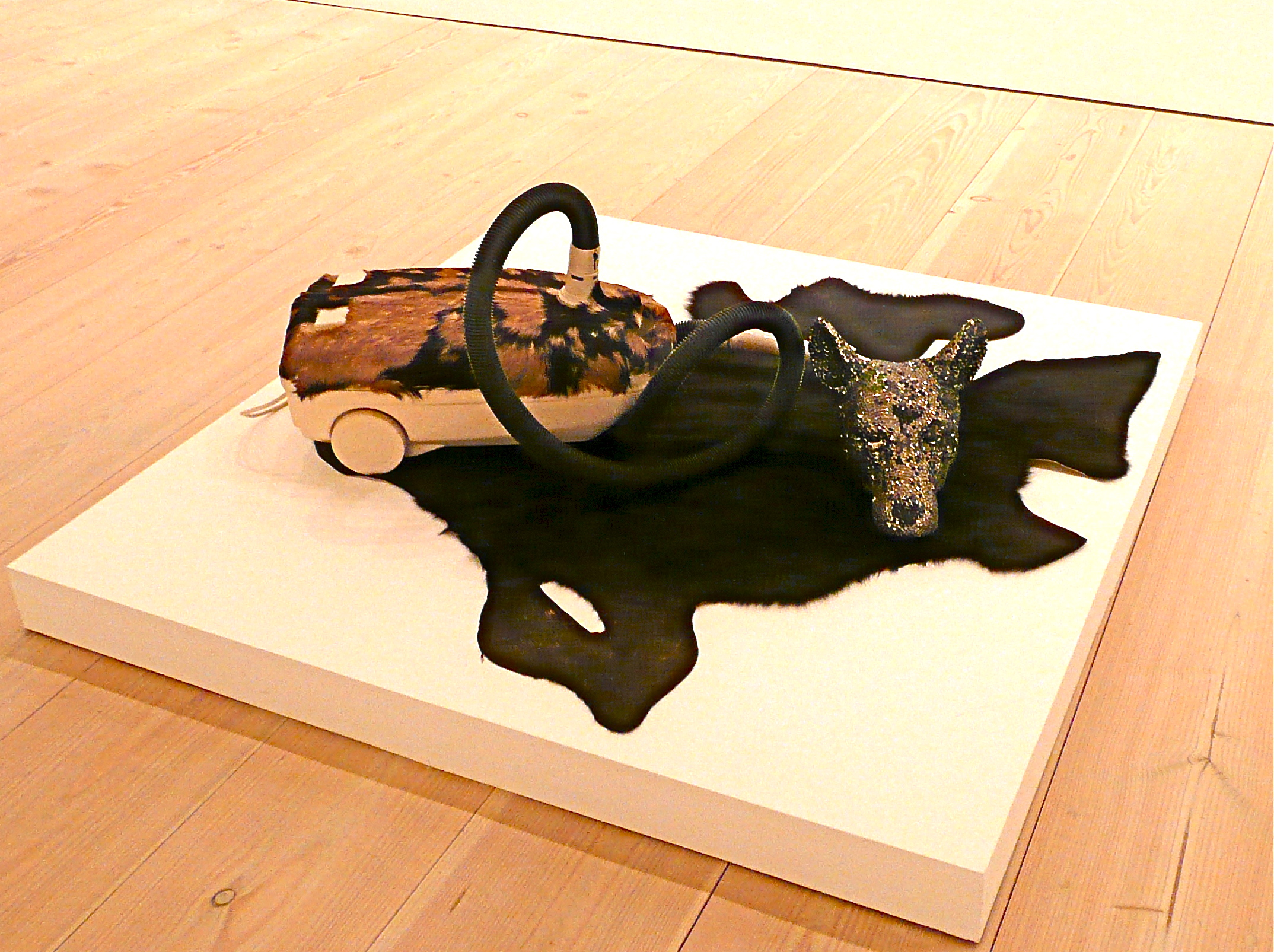
Hungry Dogs Eat Dirty Pudding, 2004

== Collections ==
Kher's work is in the Tate Modern in London, the Vancouver Art Gallery, and the Walker Art Center.

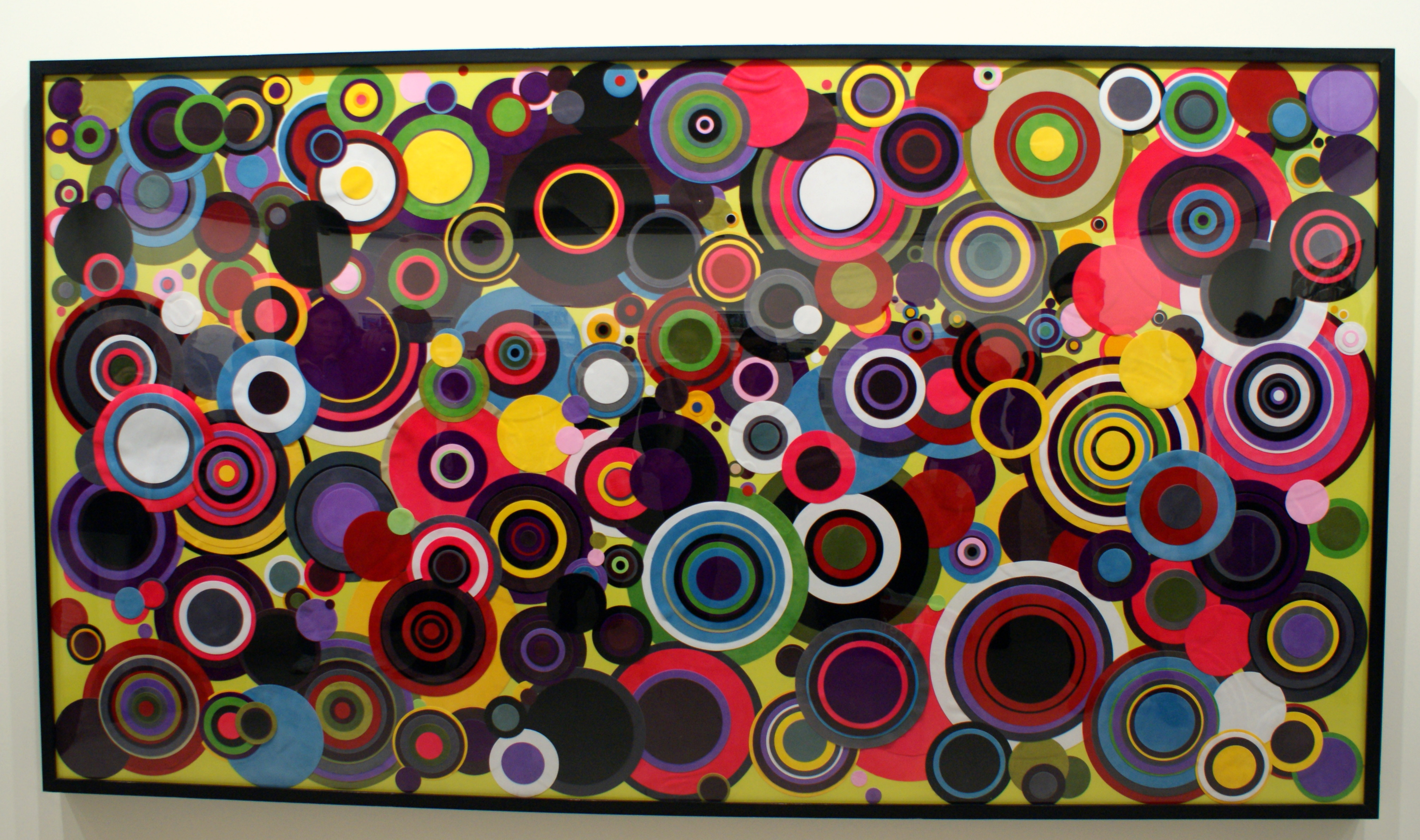
Bharti Kher, Sans Titre
