= Adam Szymczyk =

Polish art critic and curator (born 1970)

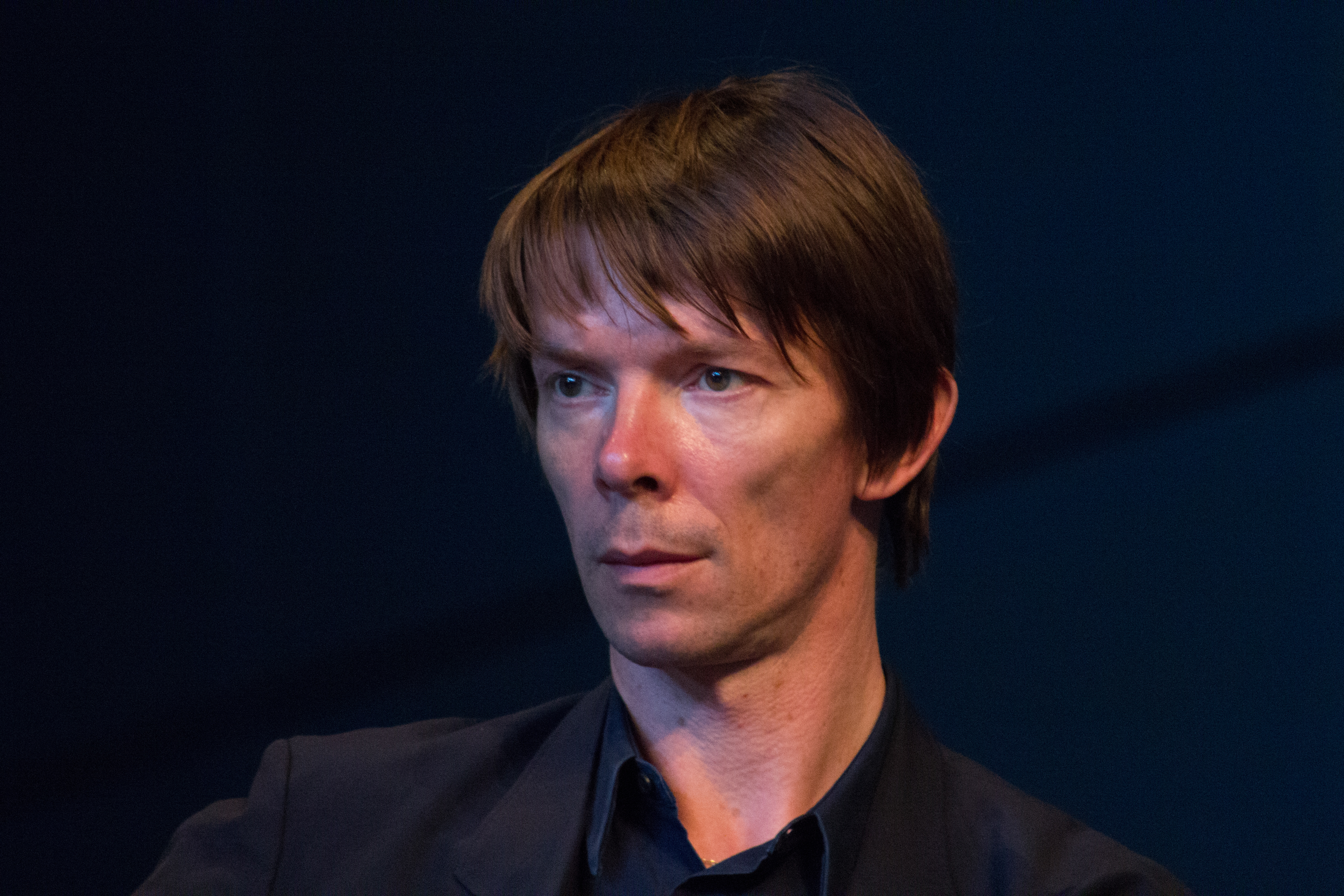
- Szymczyk in 2017
- Born: 1970 (age 55–56); Piotrków Trybunalski, Poland
- Education: University of Warsaw
- Occupations: art critic, art curator, writer
- Awards: Walter Hopps Award for Curatorial Achievement (2011)

Adam Szymczyk (Polish pronunciation: [ˈadam ˈʂɨmt͡ʂɨk]; born in 1970 in Piotrków Trybunalski) is a Polish art critic, curator, writer and editor. He worked as Artistic Director of documenta 14 in Athens and Kassel (2017), following his term as director of Kunsthalle Basel between 2003 and 2014. He is currently the director of the S AM - Swiss Architecture Museum in Basel.

== Personal life ==
He was born in 1970 in Piotrków Trybunalski in central Poland and his family soon moved to Łódź, where he frequently visited the Museum of Art in Łódź and became interested in art.

== Career ==
Szymczyk obtained his master's degree in art history at the University of Warsaw. He subsequently completed the curatorial training program at De Appel contemporary art center in Amsterdam in 1996.

After moving back to Poland, in 1997 he co-founded the Foksal Gallery Foundation in Warsaw together with Joanna Mytkowska and Andrzej Przywara and worked there as curator until 2003.

Subsequently, he was director and chief curator at Kunsthalle Basel in Switzerland from 2003 to 2014, during which he also co-curated with Elena Filipovic the 5th Berlin Biennale for Contemporary Art, When Things Cast No Shadow in 2008.

In 2013, he was appointed artistic director of documenta 14, which took place in Athens and Kassel in 2017.

== Curator ==
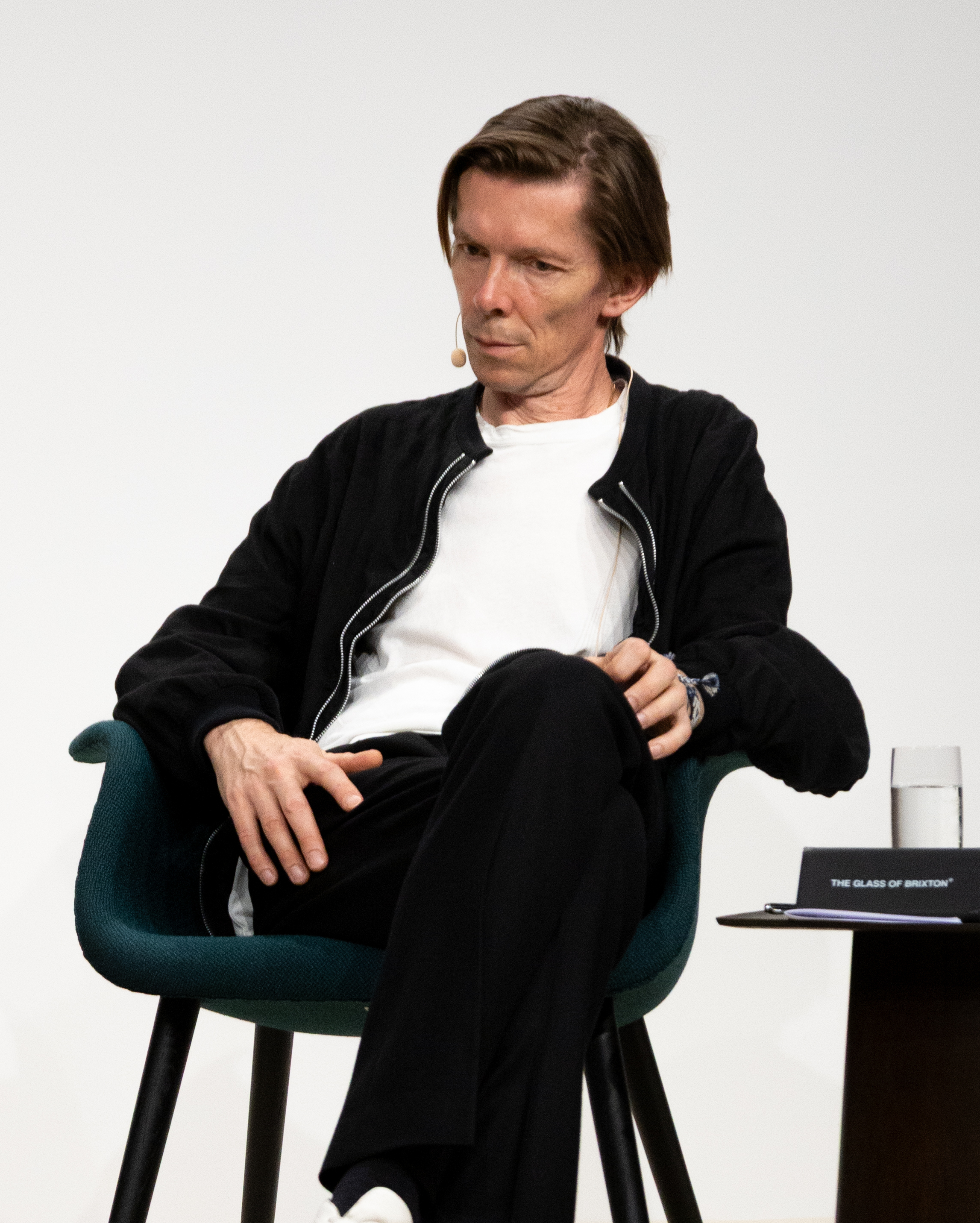
Adam Szymczyk at Art Basel 2025 in Basel 02 (cropped)

=== Selected exhibitions at Kunsthalle Basel ===
2014: Naeem Mohaiemen, Prisoners of Shotik Itihash; Vivian Suter, intrépida, featuring Elisabeth Wild Fantasias 2; Ross Birrell and David Harding, Winter Line

2013: Mandla Reuter, Allyson Vieira, "The Plural Present," Mathieu Kleyebe Abonnenc, Songs for a Mad King; Adrian Melis, The Value of Absence; Sirah Foighel Brutmann and Eitan Efrat, Journal

2012: Hannah Weinberger, When You Leave, Walk Out Backwards, So I’ll Think That You’re Walking In; Craigie Horsefield, Slow Time and the Present; Paul Sietsema; Adriana Lara, S.S.O.R.; Pamela Rosenkranz, Feeding, Fleeing, Fighting, Reproduction

2011: Sung Hwan Kim, Line Wall; How to Work and How to Work (More for Less); R.H. Quaytman, Spine, Chapter 20; Danai Anesiadou, Damnesia Vu; Yael Davids, Ending with Glass

2010: Harald Thys & Jos de Gruyter, Projekt 13; After Architects (Latifa Echakhch, David Jablonowsky, Charlotte Moth, John Smith, James Welling, Haegue Yang); Cyprien Gaillard, Obstacles to Renewal; Lili Reynaud-Dewar, Interpretation; Moyra Davey, Speaker Receiver

2009: Goshka Macuga, I Am Become Death; Thea Djordjadze, endless enclosure; Lucy Skaer, A Boat Used as a Vessel; Danh Vo, When the Lions Are; Report on Probability (Sven Augustijnen, Andreas Bunte, Patricia Esquivias, Runo Lagomarsino, Anna Molska, Anna Niesterowicz, Corin Sworn); Daniel Knorr, Led R. Nanirok

2008: Peter Friedl, Working; Aleana Egan, We sat down where we had sat before; Ahmet Öğüt, Mutual Issues, Inventive Acts; Armando Andrade Tudela, Gamblers Die Broke; Guido van der Werve, On parity of days; Alexandra Bachzetsis, Show

2007: Paola Pivi, It Just Keeps Getting Better; Micol Assaël, Chizhevsky Lessons; Minerva Cuevas, Phenomena; Ibon Arranberi, Integration

2006: Gustav Metzger, In Memoriam: New Works; Ahlam Shibli, Trackers; Diango Hernandez, Revolution; Nairy Baghramian, Es ist ausser haus; Kate Davis, STOP!STOP!STOP!; Lee Lozano, WIN FIRST DONT LAST WIN LAST DON'T CARE (retrospective exhibition, travelled to Van Abbemuseum, Eindhoven); Peter Peri Country 10; QUAUHNAUHUAC: The Straight Line Is a Utopia (Maria Thereza Alves, Dr. Atl, Ross Birrell & David Harding, Friederike Clever, Jimmie Durham, Cisco Jiménez, Robert Smithson, Hildegard Spielhofer)

2005: SUPERFLEX, Supershow; Artur Zmijewski; Tomma Abts; Carl Andre Black Wholes, 44 Carbon Copper Triads; Christoph Büchel, Hole; Jeremy Deller & Alan Kane, Folk Archive

2004: Piotr Uklański, Earth, Wind and Fire; Rosalind Nashashibi, Over In; Damian Ortega

2003: Nicoletta Stalder, Hallimasch: Was tun in 30 Tagen?/What To Do in 30 days?

=== Other curated and co-curated exhibitions (selection) ===
2021: Wilhelm Sasnal: Such a Landscape, POLIN Museum of the History of Polish Jews, Warsaw

Yannis Tsarouchis: Dancing in Real Life, co-curated with Androniki Gripari, Wrightwood 659, Chicago

2020: Elisabeth Wild: Fantasías, Karma International, Zurich, featuring Raúl Itamar Lima and Sophie Thun

2019: 1937-2017: Von Entarteter Kunst zu Enstellter Kunst, HGB-Galerie, Hochschule für Gestaltung und Buchkunst, Leipzig (with students of the HGB and including Frankfurter Hauptschule, Henrike Naumann, Olu Oguibe and Artur Żmijewski)

Tirana Patience, National Gallery of Arts, Tirana, co-curated with Nataša Ilić (works from the collection of NGA and featuring Chto Delat, Anna Daučíková, Iman Issa, Doruntina Kastrati, Larion Lozovoy, Ibrahim Mahama, David Maljkovic, Anri Sala, Gentian Shkurti and Artur Żmijewski)

Wild Spoerri Rosenstein, Hotel am Brillantengrund, Vienna (with students of the Akademie der Bildenden Künste Wien and featuring Elisabeth Wild, Daniel Spoerri and Erna Rosenstein)

2017: documenta 14, Athens and Kassel, various venues. Artistic director: Adam Szymczyk, curators: Pierre Bal-Blanc, Hendrik Folkerts, Candice Hopkins, Bonaventure Soh Bejeng Ndikung, Hila Peleg, Paul B. Preciado, Dieter Roelstraete, Monika Szewczyk, and curatorial advisors: Natasha Ginwala, Marina Fokidis, Andrea Linennkohl, Erzen Shkololli, Elena Sorokina, Paolo Thorsen-Nagel, Katerina Tselou. Full documenta 14 team list:

2012: Olinka, or Where Movement Is Created, Museo Tamayo, Mexico City (with Dr. Atl, Nahui Olin, Manuel Rodriguez Lozano, Susan Hiller, Mariana Castillo Deball, Thea Djordjadze, Vivian Suter, Elisabeth Wild, Nairy Baghramian, Paulina Olowska, Tercerunquinto, and Kate Davis, a.o.)

2010: Strange Comfort (Afforded by the Profession), co-curated with Salvatore Lacagnina, Istituto Svizzero and Keats-Shelley House, Rome (with Ross Birrell & David Harding, Nancy Davenport, Moyra Davey, Jimmie Durham, Dunja Herzog, Cécile Hummel, Goshka Macuga, Franco Vaccari, and Danh Vo)

2010: masqué, Magazin 4, Kunstverein Bregenz (with Valie Export, Tomislav Gotovac, Ion Grigorescu, Tibor Hajas, Edward Krasiński, Katerina Seda, and Artur Żmijewski, a.o.)

2008: When Things Cast No Shadow: the 5th berlin biennial of contemporary art, co-curated with Elena Filipovic, Neue Nationalgalerie, KW-Institute of Contemporary Art, Skulpturenpark Berlin_Zentrum, Schinkel Pavilion; including the program of over sixty nightly events Mes nuits sont plus belles que vos jours, various venues

2003: Hidden in a Daylight, co-curated with Joanna Mytkowska and Andrzej Przywara (with Paweł Althamer, Christoph Büchel, Omer Fast, Jeanne Faust, Lucy McKenzie & Paulina Olowska, Enrique Metinides, Pierre Huyghe, and Mathilde Rosier, a.o.), Era Nowe Horyzonty, Cieszyn, Poland

2002: Tadeusz Rolke, Kunstverein in Hamburg

2001: Painters Competition, City Gallery Bielska BWA, Bielsko-Biala, Poland

2000: Amateur 1900–2000. Variable Research Initiatives, commissioned by Konstmuseum Göteborg, co-curated with Charles Esche and Mark Kremer (with Tacita Dean, Maria Eichhorn, Job Koelewijn, Maria Lindberg, Borre Saethre, among others, and including works from various museum collections in Göteborg)

2000: Piotr Uklanski: The Nazis, Zacheta National Gallery of Contemporary Art, Warsaw

1998: Guy Debord: ad vocem, Centre of Contemporary Art, Warsaw

1998: Roundabout, Centre of Contemporary Art, Warsaw (with Olafur Eliasson, Henrik Håkansson, Twan Janssen, Claudia & Julia Müller, Manfred Pernice, Dan Peterman, Tobias Rehberger, Marijke van Warmerdam, Richard Wright)

1996: Hans Bellmer: Kattowitz 1905–Paris 1975, co-curated with Andrzej Przywara, Silesian Museum, Katowice

1996: Crapshoot, De Appel, Amsterdam, graduate show co-curated with the participants of the Curatorial Training Program (with Maurizio Catellan, Jeroen Eisinga, Kendell Geers, Henrik Plenge Jakobsen, among others)

== Teaching ==
Seminar "1937-2017: Von Entarteter Kunst zu Entstellter Kunst" at Hochschule für Gestaltung und Buchkunst, Leipzig, 2019/2020

Seminars "Principle of Equality" and "Undoing Landscape" at Akademie der Bildenden Künste, Vienna, 2019/2020 and 2020/2021

Seminar "What Is an Exhibition?" at the department of Art History, University of Basel, 2012/2013

== Other activities ==
Member of the Board of the Museum of Modern Art in Warsaw

Member of the Art Advisory Committee of Kontakt. The Art Collection of Erste Group and ERSTE Foundation in Vienna

== Prizes ==
- 2011 – Walter Hopps Award for Curatorial Achievement, Menil Foundation, Houston.
