= Elisabeth Wild =

Austrian collage artist (1922–2020)

- Born: 6 February 1922; Vienna, Austria
- Died: 12 February 2020 (aged 98)
- Children: Vivian Suter

Elisabeth Wild (6 February 1922 – 12 February 2020) was an Austrian collage artist.

== Early life and education ==
Born in Europe, Wild emigrated to Argentina with her parents in Franz and Stefanie Pollack in 1938. Wild studied painting at the Academy of Fine Arts Vienna, and drawing at the Círculo de Bellas Artes of Buenos Aires. In Buenos Aires, she worked as a textile designer, and later married a textile factory owner August Wild. In 1962 she and her husband sold their company and moved the family to Basel. In 2007 she moved to Guatemala to live with Vivian Suter, her daughter, in a former coffee plantation next to Lake Atitlán.

== Career ==
Wild exhibited with her daughter Vivian Suter in several two-person shows, including at the Mistake Room in Los Angeles in 2015, Proyectos Ultravioleta in 2016, Karma International in Los Angeles in 2017, and The Power Plant in Toronto in 2018. In 2018 she exhibited at the Carbon 12 gallery in Dubai.

In 2017 she exhibited side-by-side with Suter at Documenta 14, in an exhibition curated by Adam Szymczyk.

She died at her home in Guatemala in 2020, aged 98.

== Legacy ==
Rosalind Nashashibi's 2017 film Vivian’s Garden depicts the relationship of Wild and her artist daughter Vivian Suter.

In 2020 Wild's cover design for the London Underground's pocket Tube map was published.

Her work is included in the Kontakt Collection and in the collection of the Art Institute of Chicago.

The book Elisabeth Wild: Fantasías, documenting Wild's collage work, was edited by Adam Szymczyk and published by MIT Press in 2021.

The retrospective Elisabeth Wild. Imagination Factory, held at Mumok in Vienna, Austria in 2023 and 2024 was the first exhibition to show works from all creative periods of the artist.
