= Vivian Suter =

Argentine-Swiss artist

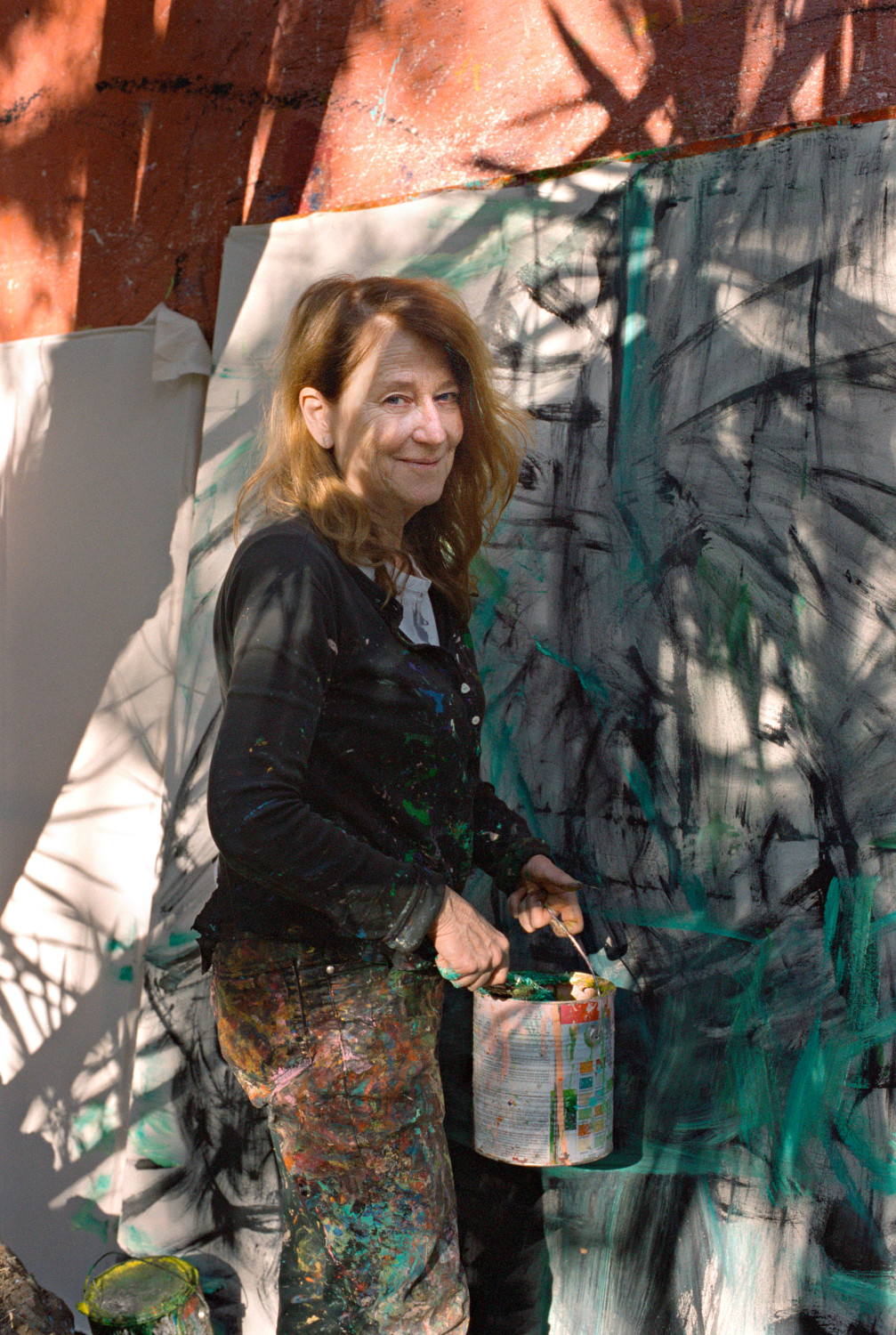
- Born: Vivian Wild; 1949 (age 76–77); Buenos Aires
- Parent: Elisabeth Wild

Vivian Suter (born 1949) is an Argentine-Swiss painter.

== Early life ==
Suter was born in Buenos Aires. Her mother, Elisabeth Wild, was a noted collage artist. At the age of 12, Suter moved to Basel, Switzerland with her family.

== Career ==
In the 1970s she exhibited in a group show at Stampa gallery in Basel, Switzerland. In 1981, she was part of a group exhibition at the Kunsthalle Basel. In 1982 she moved to a former coffee plantation in the rainforest of Panajachel, Guatemala. Suter attracted little critical attention between until 2011, when the curator Adam Szymczyk contacted her to recreate the 1981 group show at the Kunsthalle Basel. Since 2011 she has held numerous significant solo shows in European and North American galleries and museums. Vivian Suter has been awarded the Swiss Grand Award for Art / Prix Meret Oppenheim 2021 by the Federal Office of Culture.

Suter paints in a wall-less open air studio attached to her home. She has been known to use non-traditional materials in her paintings, such as fish glue, volcanic material, soil, botanical matter, and house paint, some of which are reflective of her local environment.

Her work is included in the collections of the Tate, the Museum of Modern Art, Warsaw, and the Kunstmuseum Luzern.

== Exhibitions ==
- 2017: Jewish Museum, New York
- 2017: Documenta 14, Kassel
- 2018: Vivian Suter and Elizabeth Wild, The Power Plant, Toronto
- 2019: Institute of Contemporary Art, Boston
- 2019: Tate Liverpool
- 2020: TinTin's Garden, Camden Arts Centre
- 2021: Museo Reina Sofía, Madrid
- 2021: Kunstmuseum Luzern
- 2023: Secession Building, Vienna
- 2025: I Am Godzilla at Moderna Museet Malmö
- 2025: Disco: Vivian Suter, Palais de Tokyo, Paris
- 2026: Stone in the Pond, Elleboogkerk, Amersfoort
