= Bee bearding =

Wearing honey bees on the face

Bee bearding is the practice of wearing several thousand honey bees on the face, usually as a sideshow-type demonstration at agricultural shows. Hive bees are attracted into position by a queen in a small cage worn under the chin.

== History ==
Though beekeepers since ancient times have allowed bees to rest on their bodies to demonstrate their rapport with the insects, the practice of congregating measurable quantities of bees on the face was initiated by Petro Prokopovych, a Ukrainian beekeeper, in the 1830s. The practice spread to various "freak" exhibitions at Russian carnivals by the end of the 19th century.

== Records ==
Indian man Vipin Seth set a world record for wearing a mantle of bees weighing 61.4 kilograms (135 lb).

The current record for the "heaviest mantle of bees" is held by a Chinese national, Ruan Liangming, who was filmed by Guinness World Records wearing an estimated 637,000 bees, including about 60 queen bees, weighing about 63.5 kilograms (140 lb), in May 2014.

As of August 31, 2017, the record for the longest time wearing a mantle of bees was 61 minutes.
