= Jeroen Eisinga =

Dutch video artist (born 1966)

- Born: 1966 (age 59–60); Delft
- Years active: 1993–present
- Website: www.jeroeneisinga.com

Jeroen Eisinga (born 1966 in Delft) is a contemporary video artist from the Netherlands. His work is characterised by its performance like character and its plots where an ordeal is often central. Simplicity is of key importance to Eisinga. His work is shot on film and is shot on 16mm as well as on 35mm format film.

== Life and work ==
Jeroen Eisinga is born in Delft and studied at the Arnhem Academy of Fine Arts where he graduated for his BA. Later, he also studied at the Rijksakademie van Beeldende Kunsten in Amsterdam and from 2006-2008 he finished his MA in Screenwriting at the American Film Institute Conservatory in Los Angeles. In 1997, he won third place in the Dutch Prix the Rome, a prize for young and upcoming artists and architects under 35 years old.

In Eisinga's films, there is no escape, happy end or climax. By doing so, the viewer is confronted with his powerlessness, not only over the depicted scene, but also life itself. Eisinga is currently working from The Hague.

== Artwork and projects ==
Some of the prominent films from Eisinga are listed below:

=== 40-44-PG (1993) ===
40-44-PG is Eisinga's first film, which registers a performance of a Volkswagen Beetle driving in circles without a driver. A blindfolded man is walking around trying to avoid the driving car. The steering wheel is fastened with a rope, while the gas pedal is pushed down with the aid of a rock. Whilst a collision seems almost inevitable, the man narrowly misses the automatically driven car every time. The performance was one of the things that Eisinga used to do with his twin brother Bart Eisinga. He stated that he filmed the performance in order to show that it 'happened'. The numberplate of the car is used as a title for the film.

=== Arm Schaap (1997) ===
In Arm Schaap (translated: Poor Sheep) it is not a vehicle that is the subject, but a sheep as the title suggests. A sheep is lying down on its back, unable to get back on its feet by itself. If a sheep lies on its back, it will eventually die because of the intestines pressing against the sheets lungs and spine causing it to suffocate. While we can hear the sheep trying and struggling to get air, a train is rushing past in the background. The work confronts the viewer of its powerlessness and impotence to help the sheep, showing that people do not have an influence on life itself as they are often thinking. The artwork caused many angry reactions from the Partij voor de Dieren and even led to threats.

=== Sehnsucht (2002) ===
Sehnsucht is, in contrast to 40-44-PG and Arm Schaap a black and white film that does not feature any sound. In the film, the audience is confronted with a dead zebra lying on a chess tile floor. Whilst a four month stay in Kenia, Eisinga documented the dissolution process of a dead zebra by filming the event in stop-motion. At the end of the film, nothing but an empty skin of the Zebra remains. Because of the expansion and contraction during the dissolution, the viewer gets the impression that the zebra is breathing. The film is influenced by German Romanticism.

=== Springtime (2011) ===
Springtime made Eisinga well known for the public. In this film, Eisinga slowly covered himself in a layer of bees, whilst also the background consists of a layer of bees. Eisinga slowly blends in with the background when the bees continue to cover him. To get the bees to cover him, he covered himself with the scent of the queen bee. The film is inspired by bee bearding, where a beekeeper try to leave as many of their own bees on their body as possible. Whilst filming, Eisinga was stung around 30 times. After filming, he was transported to the hospital when he started to feel miserable. He was later told he shouldn't have arrived at the hospital ten minutes later.

=== Nightfall (2018) ===
His latest film Nightfall features a group of sheep in a snow landscape standing on a frozen lake. In front of them is an ice hole with two dead sheep inside; it gives the impression that they desperately tried to get out but ultimately failed. The film is an hour long, in which no big events happen. The sheep move a little closer as time passes, and the sun sets. In the foreground we can see a pipe with a small stream of water clattering down into the ice hole, which Eisinga later told he learned to do from Hitchcock film The Birds.

== Awards and nominations ==
- 2012 - Tiger Award for Short Films
- 2007 - Peter Paul Peterich Fonds
- 2007 - Gerard Hordijk Reisfonds
- 2003 - Dolf Henkes Prijs
- 1997 - Prix the Rome (shared 3rd prize)
- 1996 - NPS Cultuurprijs (nomination)
- 1995 - Touche Prijs (nomination)

== Exhibitions ==
=== Solo exhibitions ===
- 2019 - EXPEDITIE EISINGA, De Electriciteitsfabriek, Den Haag, NL
- 2012 - Toronto International Film Festival, Future Projections: Springtime, Museum of Contemporary Canadian Art, Toronto, CA
- 2012 - Blackbox, Hirshhorn Museum and Sculpture Garden, Washington DC, USA
- 2011 - Springtime, Stedelijk Museum Schiedam, Schiedam, NL
- 2011 - Mystery Girls, Zic Zerp Gallery, Rotterdam, NL
- 2006 - The Solo’s, Crown Gallery, Art Brussels, BE
- 2004 - Sehnsucht, De Hallen, Haarlem, NL
- 2003 - Sehnsucht, Stedelijk Museum voor Actuele Kunst, Gent, BE
- 2003 - Jeroen Eisinga; Winner Henkes Prize, Tent, Rotterdam, NL
- 2003 - Eyes Wide Shut, De Paraplufabriek, Nijmegen, NL
- 1999 - The Idiot, Stedelijk Van Abbemuseum, Eindhoven, NL
- 1998 - The most important moment in my life, Hedah, Maastricht, NL
- 1995 - Jeroen Eisinga, Casco Projects, Utrecht, NL
- 1993 - De Vrije Gedachte, Stichting Archipel, Apeldoorn, NL

=== Group exhibitions ===
- 2019 - Black & White – Symbolic Meaning in Art & Design, Textiel Museum, Tilburg, NL
- 2019 - Freedom – Fifty Key Dutch Artworks since 1968, Museum de Fundatie, Zwolle, NL
- 2018 - Artistes & des Abeilles, Topographie de l’art, Paris, FR
- 2018 - Beyond the Body, Kunst Centret Silkeborg Bad, Silkeborg, DK
- 2017 - The collection as time machine, Museum Boijmans van Beuningen, Rotterdam, NL
- 2017 - DANS LA TÊTE. Une exploration de la conscience, Musée de la main, Lausanne, CH
- 2017 - Het Zalig Nietsdoen, Museum Kranenburgh, Bergen, NL
- 2016 - Kopstukken, Het Klooster, Tiel, NL
- 2016 - Into Nature, Drents Museum, Assen, NL
- 2016 - PRIÈRE DE TOUCHER – The Touch of Art, Museum Tinguely, Basel, CH
- 2016 - Rotterdam Cultural Histories #7, Witte de With & Tent, Rotterdam, NL
- 2015 - Diep Gaan, Lucy en Le Tour, Galerie Sanaa, Utrecht
- 2015 - Lost and Found, Groninger Museum, Groningen
- 2015 - Mix Match Museum, Stedelijk Van Abbemuseum, Eindhoven
- 2015 - Temporary Autonomous Zones, Museum of Contemporary Art North Miami, USA
- 2015 - Making Sense, Galerie Juliette Jongma, Amsterdam, NL
- 2015 - La La La Human Steps, Museum Boijmans van Beuningen, Rotterdam, NL
- 2015 - Pause, Zuckerman Museum of Art, Kennesaw, USA
- 2013 - The City, the Artists and the Museum. 25 Years Rotterdam City Collection, Museum Boijmans van Beuningen, Rotterdam, NL
- 2013 - Sponsored by Nature, Verbeke Foundation, Stekene, BE
- 2013 - The Glorious Rise and Fall… (and So On), Part I, KW 14, ‘s-Hertogenbosch, NL
- 2013 - Badly Natured, Nest, Den Haag, NL
- 2012 - Beyond the Body, Hans Peter Zimmer Foundation, Düsseldorf, DE
- 2012 - Maskerade, De Hallen Haarlem, NL
- 2011 - A Midsummer Nights Dream, Zic Zerp Gallery, Rotterdam, NL
- 2011 - I also have a Heart, Cankaya Public Art Manifestation, Ankara, TR
- 2011 - Eye Sea, Jeroen Eisinga and Anno Dijkstra, Kunsteyssen, Alkmaar, NL
- 2009 - Lunar Distance, De Hallen, Haarlem, NL
- 2009 - Flyersheepflagself: Part 2, Seventeen Gallery, London, UK
- 2008 - Bloody Beautiful (part 2), Ron Mandos Gallery, Amsterdam, NL
- 2007 - Contour / Continuïteit, Stedelijk Museum Het Prinsenhof, Delft, NL
- 2007 - Happy Believers, Werkleitz Biennial, Halle (Saale), DE
- 2007 - Extiem, Poëtrysummer Watou, Watou, BE
- 2007 - Autonomia, Leids Universitair Medisch Centrum, Leiden, NL
- 2007 - Zo ziet het paradijs eruit II, De Hallen, Haarlem, NL
- 2007 - Different Realities?, Crown Gallery, Brussels, BE
- 2007 - Grote Kunst voor Kleine Mensen, Museum De Paviljoens, Amere, NL
- 2003 - SHINE, Museum Boijmans Van Beuningen, Rotterdam, NL
- 2002 - Encounters, Impakt Festival, Utrecht, NL
- 2001 - CASINO 2001: 1st Quadrennial, Stedelijk Museum voor Actuele Kunst, Gent, BE
- 2001 - Locus Focus, Sonsbeek 2001, curated by Jan Hoet, Arnhem, NL
- 2000 - Still Moving, curated by Frits Gierstberg and Chris Dercon, National Museum of Modern Art Kyoto, Kyoto, JP
- 2000 - Exorcism Aesthetic Terrorism, Museum Boijmans Van Beuningen, Rotterdam, NL
- 2000 - Home is where the Heart is, Museum van Loon, Amsterdam, NL
- 2000 - Wouldn’t it be nice?, Netherlands Media Art Institute Montevideo/Time Based Arts, Amsterdam, NL
- 2000 - ‘t – Lokaal 01 Breda, Breda, NL
- 1998 - Young Dutch Art, Stedelijk Van Abbemuseum, Eindhoven, NL
- 1998 - Jeroen Eisinga and Gert Robijns, Zeno X Gallery, Antwerp, BE
- 1998 - Fast Forward, Stichting Fonds voor BKVB, Amsterdam, NL
- 1997 - Diskland Snowscape, curated by Harm Lux, Shed im Eisenwerk, Frauenfeld, CH
- 1997 - Observations, recent acquisitions KPN, P.T.T. Museum, The Hague, NL
- 1996 - Peiling 5, Stedelijk Museum Amsterdam, Amsterdam, NL
- 1996 - Crap Shoot, De Appel, Amsterdam, NL
- 1996 - NPS Cultuurprijs 96, Kunsthal, Rotterdam, NL
- 1996 - Performing on the edge, Tejatro Popular, Rotterdam, NL
- 1996 - Het grote Verlangen, Gelderland Biennial, Museum Henriëtte Polak Zutpen, NL
- 1995 - Shaking Patterns, W139, Amsterdam, NL
- 1995 - Touche Prize, Arti et Amicitiae, Amsterdam, NL
- 1995 - De Heelal Hoed, de Vleeshal, Middelburg
