= Frankfurter Hauptschule =

German student artist collective

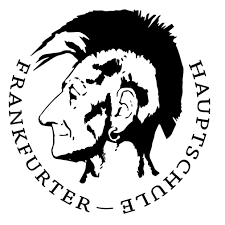
Logo

Frankfurter Hauptschule (FHS) is a German artist collective consisting of around 20 art students associated with the Städelschule. The collective first garnered international attention by staging the theft of Joseph Beuys' multiple "Capri Batterie" from an exhibition in Oberhausen and later transferring it to a museum in Tanzania as an act of symbolic restitution.

The group has been holding a guest professorship at Berlin University of the Arts since 2021.

== Work ==
Frankfurter Hauptschule is known for making provocative and ambivalent political gestures. The group uses different mediums such as interventions, performance art, installations, and exhibitions.

=== Stunt at the Richard-Wagner-Festival ===
In 2013, the group appeared for the first time during the annual Richard-Wagner-Festival, a music festival created in honor of German composer Richard Wagner in the German city of Bayreuth. During their first known stunt, members of the group handed out 50,000 counterfeit free tickets to the opening night of the festival. According to Frankfurter Hauptschule, Wagner, who has openly articulated anti-semitic sentiments, had been receiving amnesty and praise from the German public for decades - despite his controversial views.

Katharina Wagner, director of the festival and great-granddaughter of Richard Wagner, filed a complaint with the police but the group could not be persecuted due to a lack of evidence.

=== Heroin performance ===
During their formative years, the group showcased performances around gentrification. In 2015, Frankfurter Hauptschule announced a public performance of heroin usage in Frankfurt's Bahnhofsviertel, a neighborhood known for its Red-light district and open drug scene. After initial threats of banning, the performance was later successfully held in front of Frankfurt's City hall, Römer, and sparked both outrage and general discussion around the controversial open drug scene.

=== Bad Beuys go Africa ===
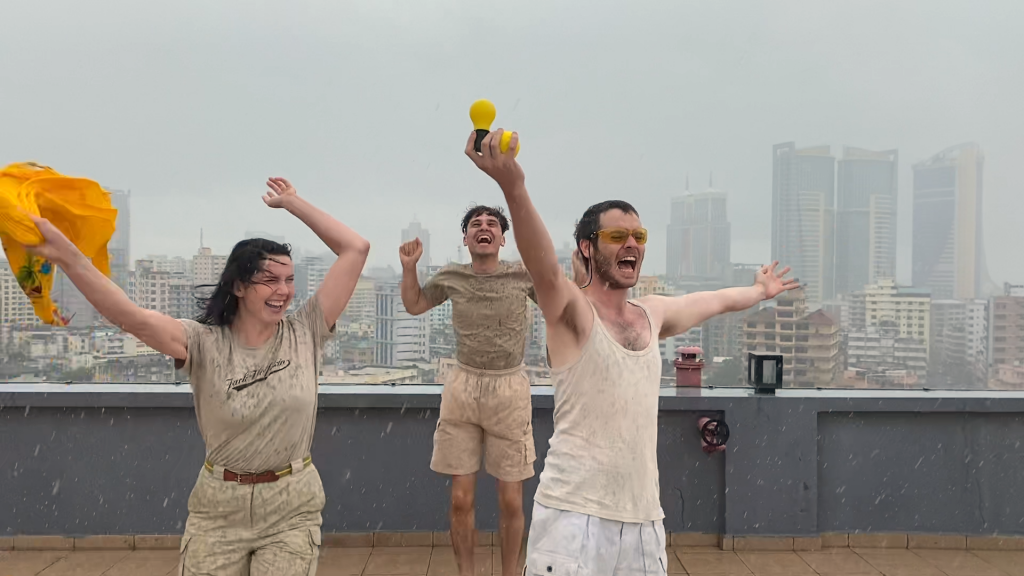
Film still from the performance "Bad Beuys go Africa" by Frankfurter Hauptschule

In 2020, the artist collective appeared to have stolen the Joseph Beuys multiple "Capri-Batterie" from an exhibition in the German city of Oberhausen to smuggle it to the former German colony of Tanzania as an act of symbolic restitution.

In a video titled "Bad Beuys go Africa" and posted to YouTube, Frankfurter Hauptschule appears to document the theft and subsequent delivery to the Tanzanian museum Iringa Boma, accompanied by a cover of the song "Africa" by Toto. According to Süddeutsche Zeitung, the theft went unnoticed for several days but later prompted an investigation by German authorities. After the supposed theft had made international headlines all over the world, Frankfurter Hauptschule revealed that the entire act had been faked. The collective had worked together with Tanzanian curator Deonis Mgumba to raise awareness for Nazi-looted art that is still unrightfully on display in German museums. American scholar Adam Blackler confirmed that the video would "certainly generate more discussion about the controversies surrounding colonial artifacts [and] repatriation."

The real Capri-Batterie was later found in a back room at the original exhibition site.

== Controversies ==
In 2018, Frankfurter Hauptschule installed a sculpture in the form of a torched and burned-out police car in Frankfurt's Red-light district as a protest against the displacement of drug addicts in the area. The city's chief of police denounced the installation of the sculpture as it supposedly called for violence against the police. Despite the substantial critique from city officials, the prestigious Städelschule showed their support for the controversial installation.

The police car was later available for purchase both at the Frankfurter Hauptschule Online Shop and at Art Cologne in 2023.

At their first solo exhibition at Neuer Aachener Kunstverein in 2022, the police had to remove a sculpture of a dreamcatcher the artist collective had installed in a nearby park. Residents had submitted complaints as the artwork featured the Nazi-symbol of the Black Sun. According to Frankfurter Hauptschule, the exhibition was supposed to hint at the connections between esoteric practices, conspiracy ideologies and fascism, which had become particularly apparent during the COVID-19 pandemic.
