= Kharma International =

Dutch audio equipment company

Kharma International B.V.
- Company type: B.V.
- Industry: Electronics
- Founded: 1992 Breda
- Headquarters: Breda, the Netherlands
- Key people: Charles van Oosterum, Owner
- Products: Consumer electronics

Kharma International B.V., usually known as Kharma, is a High-end audio equipment manufacturer producing mainly loudspeakers and cables.

== History ==
The company was founded Oosterum Loudspeaker Systems (O.L.S. Audiotechnology) in 1982 by Charles van Oosterum.

In 1984 Kharma was the first company to use ceramic material as membrane in their driver units.

After starting international promotion at the C.E.S. in 1997, it expanded sales from the Netherlands to the United States and the Far East.
