= Ross Birrell =

Australian rugby league footballer

Personal information
- Full name: Ross Lindsay Birrell
- Born: 17 December 1948
- Died: 16 March 2015 (aged 66)

Playing information
- Position: Centre, Fullback, Wing
Club
Years	Team	Pld	T	G	FG	P
1972–75	South Sydney	56	10	38	1	107
1973	→Hull KR	18	2	14	0	34
	Total	74	12	52	1	141

Ross Lindsay Birrell (17 December 1948 - 16 March 2015) was an Australian professional rugby league footballer who played for the South Sydney Rabbitohs.

== Biography ==
Born in 1948, Birrell started out as rugby union player and toured overseas with the Emerging Wallabies team, before making the switch to rugby league.

Birrell was a member of South Sydney's first-grade team from 1972 to 1975, playing as a centre, fullback and winger. Occasionally he served as the team's goalkicker and amassed 17-points in a win over Balmain in 1972. During his time at South Sydney he also had a stint in England with Hull Kingston Rovers.

In 1976 he left South Sydney to coach the Wagga Magpies.

Birrell died from cancer in 2015, at the age of 66. A real estate agent, he was the founder of Thornton Realty in Maitland, which he had established in 1996.
