= Queen clip =

Beekeeping tool

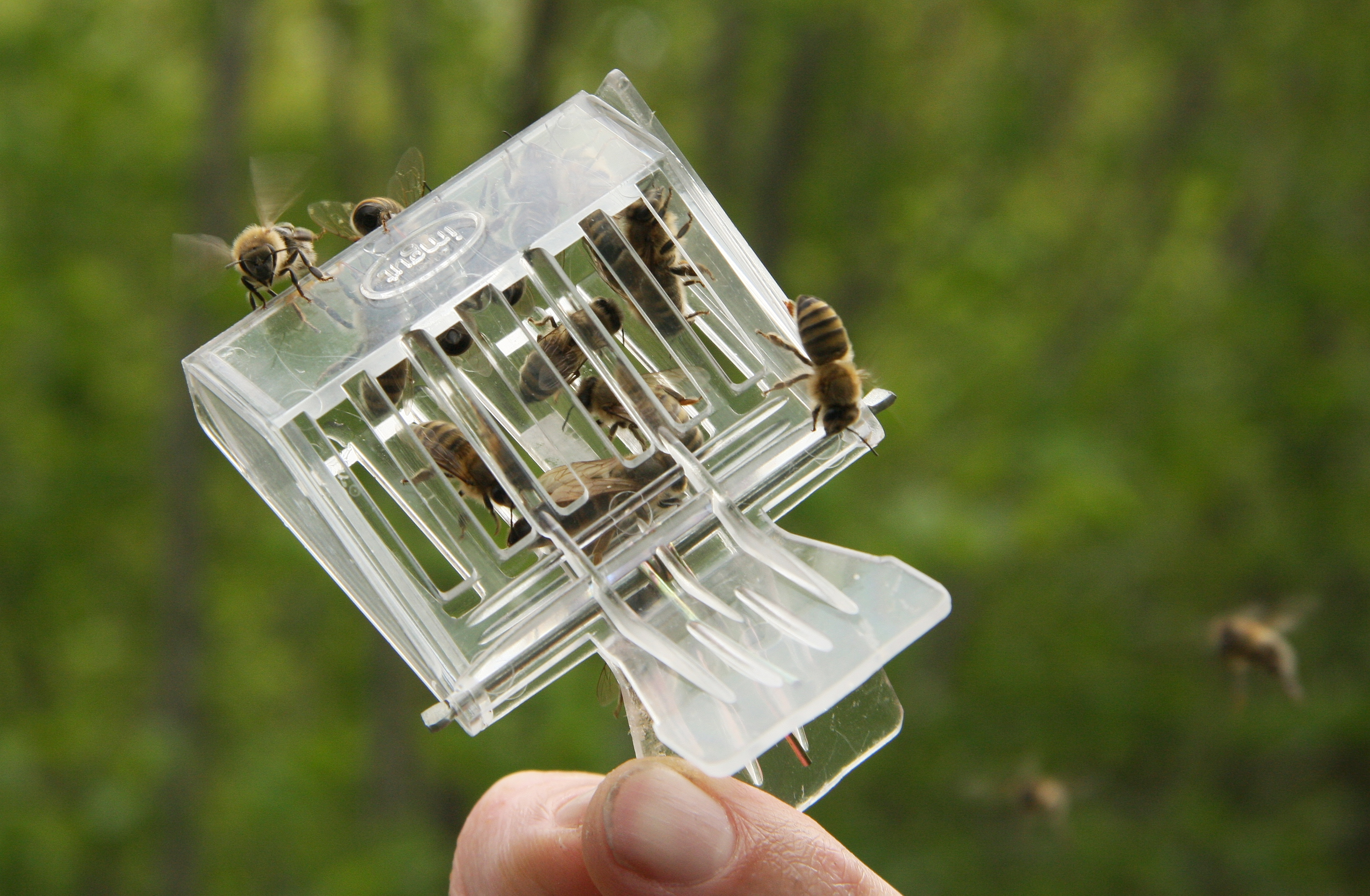
A plastic queen clip

In beekeeping, a queen clip is a small spring-loaded metal or plastic clamshell-shaped clip designed to pick up or contain a queen bee. It has slits in its sides that worker bees can pass through to attend to the queen's needs or to receive queen substance, but the queen bee cannot pass through.

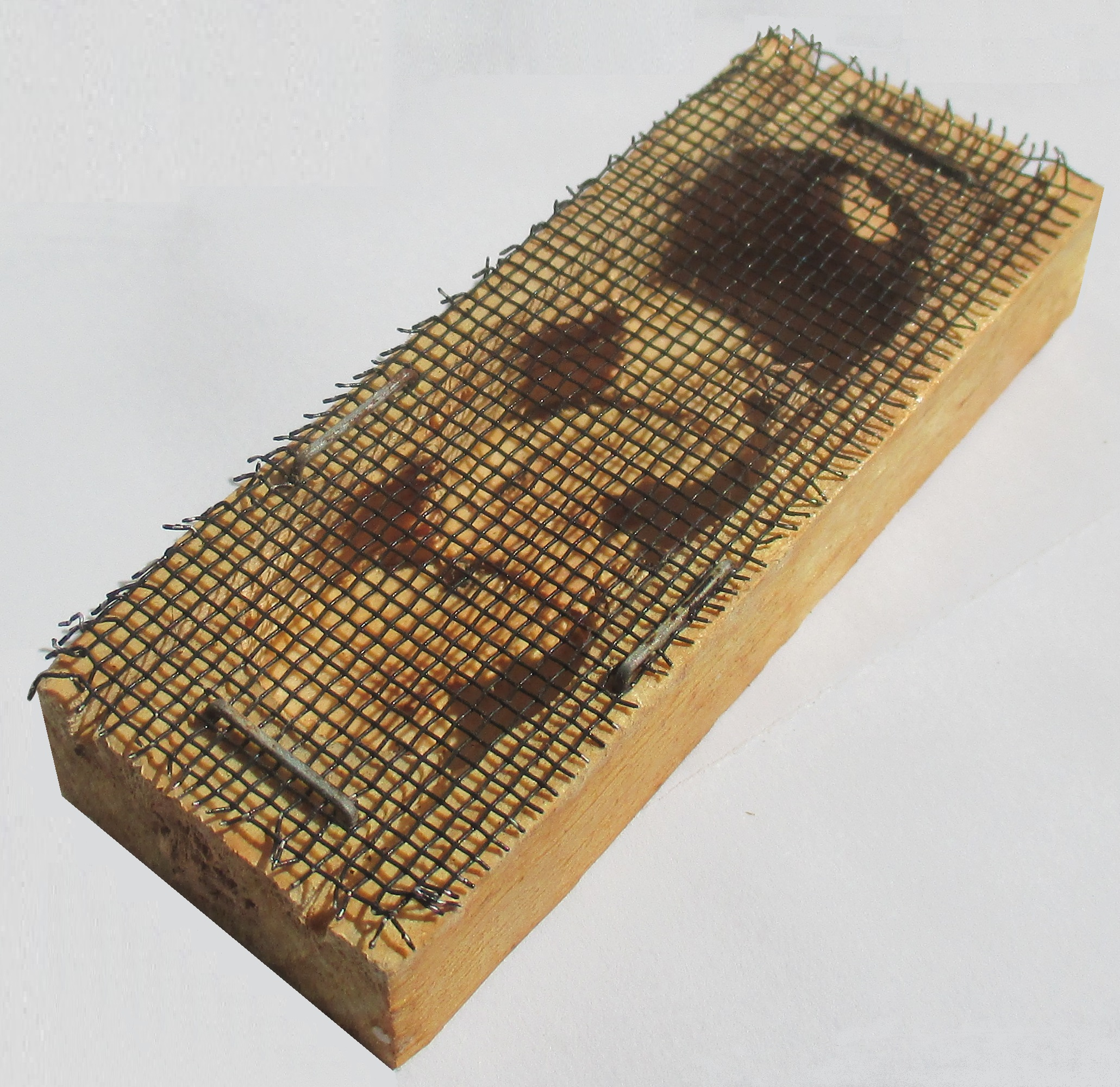
Queen mailing and introduction cage

When empty, it can be clipped onto some convenient place, such as the edge of the beekeeper's lapel.

The queen clip is completely different from the queen mailing and introduction cage which, as the name implies, is employed by queen breeders to mail each single queen to their customer. The customer then uses it to introduce the queen into a hive. The mailing cage has room for the queen and a few escort nurse bees, and some candied honey covering the exit. The hive's worker bees consume the candied honey over a period of a few days to release the queen.
