= Allyson Vieira =

Allyson Vieira is an American artist living and working in New York City, New York. She is primarily known for her sculptural works and drawings. She was born in Massachusetts in 1979. Vieira studied art at The Cooper Union for the Advancement of Science and Art, receiving her Bachelor of Fine Arts in 2001, and studied sculpture at the Milton Avery Graduate School of Arts at Bard College, receiving her Master of Fine Arts in 2009. Vieira is represented by Laurel Gitlen Gallery in New York City. Vieira's drawings were published in Untitled Book (Geometry + Democracy) by Evil Twin Publications.

== Solo exhibitions ==
- 2010 "Ozymandias," Laurel Gitlen Gallery, New York
- 2007 "Untitled Book (Geometry + Democracy)," Klaus Von Nichtsaagend Gallery, Brooklyn, NY. Book Release
- 2006 "Allyson Vieira," Small A Projects, Portland, OR

== Selected group exhibitions ==
- 2010 "Knight’s Move," SculptureCenter, New York (catalogue)
- 2010 "Point to one end, which is always present," Laurel Gitlen Gallery, New York
- 2009 "Evading Customs," curated by Peter J. Russo and Lumi Tan, Brown Gallery, London, England (pdf catalogue)
- 2009 "NOBODIES NEW YORK," curated by Josh Kline, 179 Canal Street, New York
- 2008 “Champion Zero,” Rental Gallery, New York (catalogue)
- 2008 “200597214200022008,” Small A Projects, New York
- 2008 “Cube Passerby 2008” Passerby, Gavin Brown Enterprises. New York
- 2007 “First Hand Steroids,” Andreas Melas Presents, REmap KM in association with the Athens Biennial, Athens, Greece.
- 2004 “The Freedom Salon.” Deitch Projects, NY. Group exhibition curated by Tina Kukielski and Apsara DiQuinzio.
