= Nancy Davenport =

Canadian photographer (born 1965)

- Born: 1965 (age 60–61); Vancouver, British Columbia, Canada
- Occupation: Photographer

Nancy Davenport (born 1965 in Vancouver, British Columbia) is a Canadian photographer. Her photography, animations and digital work have been exhibited at venues including the Liverpool Biennial, the Istanbul Biennial, the 25th Bienal de São Paulo, DHC/Art Fondation pour l’art Contemporain in Montreal and the First Triennial of Photography & Video at the International Center of Photography, NY.

Her work has appeared in October, Artforum, Art in America, ARTnews, and Flash Art. She is represented by Nicole Klagsbrun Gallery.

She is Assistant Professor of Fine Arts in the University of Pennsylvania School of Design, and she has also served as the Henry Wolf Chair at Cooper Union New York and has taught in the Master of Fine Arts programs at Bard, New York, the School of Visual Arts, New York, and Yale University.

She lives in New York City.

== Awards ==
- 2009 Rome Prize

== Exhibition ==
- 2011 Militarhistorisches Museum der Bundeswehr, Dresden, Germany
- 2010 Instituto Svizzero Roma
- 2009 Art Gallery of Windsor, Canada; LABoral, Gijón, Spain; Z33, Hasselt, Belgium
- 2008 Nicole Klagsbrun Gallery, New York; Liverpool Biennial International 08, Liverpool, UK; DHC/Art Fondation pour l’art Contemporain, Montréal; The Power Plant, Toronto
- 2007 10th International Istanbul Biennial, Istanbul, Turkey
- 2005 Mead Gallery, University of Warwick, Coventry, England
- 2004 Nicole Klagsbrun Gallery, New York; MIT List Arts Center -Media Wall, Cambridge, Mass.
- 2003 International Center of Photography, New York, NY; de Singel International Kunstcentrum, Antwerp
- 2002 Photo & Contemporary, Turin, Italy
- 2001 Nicole Klagsbrun Gallery, New York
- 2000 The Floating Gallery, Winnipeg, Canada
- 1999 Corchoran Gallery, NJCU
- 1998 Mercer Union, Toronto, Canada; OR Gallery, Vancouver, Canada
- 1997 La Centrale, Montréal, Canada
- 1996 Linda Kirkland Gallery, New York
- 1995 Nicole Klagsbrun Gallery, New York
- 1994 Gracie Mansion Gallery, New York
- 1992 YYZ Artist's Outlet, Toronto, Canada

== Bibliography ==
- Nancy Davenport, Renovation, introduction by Reinaldo Laddaga (New York: Cabinet Books, 2016). ISBN 9781932698756, 1932698752
