= Alexandra Bachzetsis =

Swiss choreographer and visual artist

- Born: 1974 (age 51–52); Zürich, Switzerland
- Known for: Choreography, Visual Art

Alexandra Bachzetsis (born 1974) is a Greek-Swiss choreographer and visual artist Her artistic media include visual arts, dance, performance and theater.

== Biography ==
Bachzetsis was born Zürich, Switzerland in 1974. She studied in the Zürcher Kunstgymnasium and in the Dimitri Schule in Verscio, both in Switzerland. She studied the Performance Educational Program in STUK Arts Centre in Leuven, Belgium from 1997 to 1999.

From 1999 to 2004 she was a dancer in Les Ballet C. from the B. Sasha Waltz & Guests in Berlin, Germany, although she created her own company in 2001 where she participates as dancer and choreographer. She did her Masters studies in Choreography and Performance in Das Arts in Amsterdam, Netherlands between 2004 and 2006.

In 2015 she was an artist in residency at three different spaces: Sterna Nisyros Residence in Greece, Tanzhaus Zurich in Switzerland and in Rauschenberg Residency in Captiva, Florida, United States.

Bachzetsis is represented in Mexico City by the Kurimanzutto gallery and in Germany by Meyer Riegger gallery.

== Exhibitions ==
Bachzetsis has had several individual and collective exhibitions in different countries, such as Germany, Belgium, China, United States, France, Greece, The Netherlands, Mexico, United Kingdom and Portugal.

=== Solo exhibitions ===
- 2017 – Massacre: Variations on a Theme. MoMA, New York City.
- 2016 – Private: Wear a mask when you talk to me. Festival DansFabrik, Le Quartz, Scène nationale de Brest, Brest, France.
- 2016 – Gold. Power Station of Art, Shanghai, China.
- 2016 – Gold. Wing Platform, Hong Kong, China.
- 2016 – Gold. OX Warehouse, Macau, China.
- 2016 – From A to B via C. Maillon, Théatre de Strasbourg, France.
- 2016 – Private: Wear a mask when you talk to me – Swiss Premiere. Das Tanzfest Basel, Kaserne Basel, Basel, Germany.
- 2016 – Private: Wear a mask when you talk to me. Zürich Tanzt, Kunsthaus Zürich, Zürich, Switzerland.
- 2016 – Private: Wear a mask when you talk to me. Radio Athènes, Athens, Greece.
- 2016 – Private: Wear a mask when you talk to me. Museum Unterlinden, Colmar, France.
- 2016 – Private: Wear a mask when you talk to me. Liste Art Fair Basel, Kaserne Basel, Basel, Germany.
- 2016 – Gold and Private: Wear a mask when you talk to me. Kunstverein Hannover, Ausstellung Körper und Bühnen, Hannover, Germany.
- 2016 – Private: Wear a mask when you talk to me. CAPC Bordeaux and Festival FAB, Bordeaux, France.
- 2016 – Massacre: Variations on a Theme, Kaserne Basel, Basel, Germany.
- 2016 – Private: Wear a mask when you talk to me. Maria Matos Teatro Municipal, Lisboa, Portugal.
- 2015 – From A to B via C. Fabriktheater Rote Fabrik, Zürich, Switzerland.
- 2015 – From A to B via C. Swiss Institute, New York, United States.
- 2015 – X-Apartments. Onassis Cultural Center, Athens, Greece.
- 2015 – Gold. Naturistorisches Museum, Basel, Switzerland.
- 2015 – From A to B via C. Stedelijk Museum, Amsterdam, Netherlands.
- 2015 – From A to B via C. Serralves, Porto, Portugal.
- 2015 – From A to B via C. Theaterhaus Gessnerallee, Zürich, Switzerland.
- 2015 – From A to B via C. Centre Pompidou & Centre Cultural Suisse, Paris, France.
- 2015 – Gold. CAPC / Musée d’Art Contemporain de Bordeaux, Bordeaux, France.
- 2015 – An Event by Alexandra Bachzetsis and a DJ Act by Lies Vanborm. David Roberts Art Foundation, London, United Kingdom.
- 2015 – From A to B via C. Swiss Contemporary Dance Festival, St. Petersburg, Russia.
- 2014 – From A to B via C. Museo Jumex, Mexico City, Mexico. (curated by Patrick Charpenel).
- 2014 – From A to B via C. BMW: Performance Room, Tate Modern, London (curated by Catherine Wood).
- 2014 – Gold. Kurimanzutto, Mexico City, Mexico.
- 2014 – Solo Show, Bonner Kunstverein, Bonn, Germany.
- 2013 – The Stages of Staging, Stedelijk Museum, Amsterdam, the Netherlands.
- 2011 – A Piece Danced Alone, Chisenhale Gallery, London, United Kingdom. L’Escorte The Escort, (curated by Pierre Bal-Blanc) CAC Brétigny, Paris, France.
- 2010 – Play, Kunsthaus Glarus, Glarus, Switzerland.
- 2008 – Show, Kunsthalle Basel, Basel, Switzerland.
- 2007 – This Side Up (in collaboration with Julia Born), Perla Mode, Message Salon, Zürich, Switzerland.
- 2006 – Show Dance, De Appel, Amsterdam, the Netherlands.
- 2005 – Handwerk, Juliette Jongma Gallery, Amsterdam, the Netherlands.
- 2004 – Murder Mysteries (in collaboration with Danai Anesiadou), Etablissement d’enface, Brussels, Belgium.

=== Group exhibitions ===
- 2017 documenta 14
- 2016 Gold and Private: Wear a mask when you talk to me. Art Night London in collaboration with ICA, London, London, United Kingdom.
- 2015 Let's Dance. Art Stations gallery, Poznan, Poland.
- 2014 From A to B via C. Biennale of Moving Images, (curated by Hans Ulrich Obrist, Andrea Bellini and Yann Chateigné) Geneva, Switzerland.
- 2014 Undressed. Le Movement, (curated by Gianni Jetzer and Chris Sharp) Biel, Bern, Switzerland.
- 2014 Rehearsal Ongoing. Elevation, (curated by Neville Wakefield and Olympia Scarry) Gstaad, Bern, Switzerland.
- 2013 A Piece Danced Alone. ABC Art Berlin Contemporary at Gallery Meyer Riegger, Berlin, Germany.
- 2012 S.M.A.K. Track – A Contemporary City Invitation (curated by Mirjam Varadinis), Gent, Belgium.
- 2012 La Jeunesse es un Art. Jubiläum Manor Kunstpreis 2012, Kunsthaus Aarau, Switzerland.
- 2012 dOCUMENTA (13) (curated von Carolyn Christov-Bakargiev), Kassel, Germany.
- 2012 The F-Word. (curated by Anke Hoffmann), Shedhalle Zürich, Germany.
- 2012 Glasgow International Festival of Visual Art, (curated by Katrina Brown) CCA Centre for Contemporary Arts Glasgow, Scotland.
- 2011 3rd Thessaloniki Biennale of Contemporary Art, Macedonian Museum, Thessaloniki, Greece.
- 2011 Swiss Art Awards 2011, Basel, Switzerland.
- 2010 Performative Structures New Existentialism Part 1. (Curaduría de Alexandra Blättler). Alte Fabrik Rapperswil, Suiza.
- 2009 Quick, Quick, Slow. Text, Image and Time. (curated by Emily King), Museu Colecçao Berardo and Experimenta Design Lisboa, Lisbon, Portugal.
- 2009 Something Raw. International Dance and Performance Festival. (curated by Fleurie Kloostra and Tom Rummens), Brakke Grond, Flemish Cultural Centre, Amsterdam, the Netherlands.
- 2009 The Swiss Cube (curated by Salvatore Lacagnina), Instituto Svizzero, Rome, Italy.
- 2009 LISTE 09 Performance Project. (curated by Silke Bitzer), Basel, Switzerland.
- 2008 Aurum. (curated by Dolores Denaro), CentrePasquArt, Biel, Bern, Switzerland. Word Event. (curated by Maxine Kopsa and Roos Gortzak), Kunsthalle Basel, Basel, Switzerland.
- 2008 When Things Cast No Shadow – 5th berlin biennial for contemporary art (curated by Adam Szymczyk and Elena Filipovic), Berlin, Germany.
- 2008 Shifting Identities, (curated by Miriam Varadinis), Kunsthaus Zürich, Zürich, Germany.
- 2007 Forms of Inquiry: The Architecture of Critical Graphic Design. (curated by Zak Kyes), Architectural Association School of Architecture, London, United Kingdom.
- 2007 If I Can't Dance, I Don't Want To Be Part Of Your Revolution. (curated by Frederike Bergholz and Anne Fletcher), De Appel, Amsterdam, the Netherlands.
- 2007 The Weasel. (curated by Kit Hammonds), South London Gallery, London, United Kingdom.
- 2006 If I Can't Dance, I Don't Want To Be Part Of Your Revolution. (curated by Frederike Bergholz and Anne Fletcher), Festival aan de Werf, Utrecht, The Netherlands.
- 2005 (My private) Heroes. (curaduría de Jan Hoet), MARTA, Herford, Alemania. Slow Art (curaduría de Mattijs Visser) Museum Kunst Palast. Düsseldorf, Alemania.
- 2005 (My private) Heroes. (curated by Jan Hoet), MARTA, Herford, Germany.
  - Slow Art (curated by Mattijs Visser) Museum Kunst Palast, Düsseldorf, Germany.
- 2005 Le look c’est chic (curated by Anne Rosset), Shedhalle Rote Fabrik, Zürich, Germany.
- 2005 Split Subjects (curated by Francesco Bernardelli), De Appel, Amsterdam, Germany.
- 2005 In This Colony (curated by Maxine Kopsa), The Kunstfort Vijvuhizen, Amsterdam, the Netherlands.
- 2005 Emotion Pictures (curated by Dieter Roelstraete), MUHKA, Antwerp, Germany.
- 2004 If I Can't Dance, I Don't Want To Be Part Of Your Revolution. (curated by Frederike Bergholz and Anne Fletcher), Festival aan de Werf, Utrecht, Netherlands.
- 2004 Fifth anniversary of S.M.A.K., S.M.A.K., Gent, Belgium.
  - I need you (curated by Dolores Denaro) CentrePasquArt, Biel, Switzerland.
- 2003 Tourettes (curated by Wil Holder and Stuart Bailey), W139, Amsterdam, the Netherlands
- 2002 Performance Festival (curated by Esther Eppstein), Message Salon, Zürich, Germany.

== Awards and grants ==
- 2018 – Kunstpreis 2018 by the city of Zürich, Switzerland
- 2016 – The Swiss Art Awards, Art category
- 2012 – Swiss Performance Prize. Switzerland.
- 2011 – Swiss Art Award. Switzerland.
- 2009 – Kultur Department Kanton Basel-Land, Prize for the Performance of “Bluff.”
- 2009 – Stadt Zürich work scholarship for choreography.
- 2007 – Migros Kulturprozent Jubilee Award.
