= Paul Sietsema =

Paul Sietsema (born 1968) is a Los Angeles–based American artist who works primarily in film, painting and drawing. His work addresses the production, consumption, and proliferation of cultural objects, reflecting his interest in the possibility of an artwork to mediate information or meaning in a way that engages with the aesthetics of a specific time period. In the words of Sarah Robayo Sheridan, “Paul Sietsema compounds organic and artificial detritus in all his artwork, scavenging in history’s wake to identify specific tools of cultural production and foraging for concepts of art promulgated in the words of artists and attitudes of critics. He mines film as a vestige, the medium of the mechanical age, pressing and squeezing its very obsolescence through a contemporary sieve. In so doing, the artist hovers in the switchover between a bodily inscription in the image and a fundamental reconstitution of sight and representation in the matrix of the virtual. Where body stops and image starts is a divide collapsing through a series of innovations and accidents that go back as far as the people of Pompeii trapped in an emulsion that marked their death, but which paradoxically carried forward their image into eternity.”

== Early life and education ==
Sietsema was born in Southern California and moved to Northern California as a teenager. He attended high school in Mill Valley and became involved in the Bay Area punk scene revolving around clubs such as the Mabuhay Gardens and the On Broadway in San Francisco in the early to mid 1980s. In 1992, Sietsema visited the first US solo exhibition of Jeff Koons, at the San Francisco Museum of Modern Art, which proved to be an influence on his early thinking and work.

Sietsema completed his undergraduate studies at the University of California at Berkeley in 1992. He enrolled in UCLA's New Genres graduate program in 1996 and began studying with Chris Burden, Paul McCarthy, and Charles Ray, receiving his MFA in 1999.

== Early career ==
In 1994, the American painter Peter Saul included Sietsema in a group exhibition he curated in Austin, Texas. While a student at UCLA, Sietsema self-published a series of three books documenting the performances he made there, which were often sculpture based. During this time, he worked in the studios of Chris Burden and Charles Ray. Sietsema also met the artist Dan Graham while at UCLA, who included Sietsema's early work in a group exhibition he curated at 303 Gallery in New York.

Sietsema's first solo exhibition took place at Brent Petersen Gallery in Los Angeles in 1998, where he exhibited his first 16mm film, Untitled (Beautiful Place). Following this exhibition, Artforum published a feature article by Bruce Hainley on Sietsema's work. Hainley included Sietsema in his 2000 group exhibition, “Mise-en-Scene: New LA Sculpture” at the Santa Monica Museum of Art, and Untitled (Beautiful Place) was included in the large survey, “The Americans: New Art,” at the Barbican Gallery in London, 2001.

The Belgian curator Jan Hoet visited the artist at his studio in 2000 and invited him to participate in the international exhibition “Sonsbeek 9” in 2001 in the Netherlands. “Sonsbeek 9” published a book by Sietsema, Construction of Vision, in conjunction with the exhibition. Hoet, a friend of Marcel Broodthaers, educated Sietsema about the artist's work and showed him many of Broodthaers’ pieces in both private and public collections in Belgium.

In 2002, Sietsema's second solo show in Los Angeles took place at Regen Projects, where he exhibited the film Empire. This film and additional material (drawings and constructions) comprised Sietsema's first solo museum exhibition, at the Whitney Museum of American Art in New York in 2003. Empire was included in a group exhibition at Modern Art Oxford in 2004.

In 2005, curators Daniel Birnbaum, Hans Ulrich Obrist, and Gunnar Kvaram invited Sietsema to participate in the exhibition “Uncertain States of America” at the Astrup Fearnley Museum, which travelled to the Hessel Museum at Bard College, the Serpentine Galleries, and additional venues in Poland, Iceland, China, and Russia.

== Career ==
The San Francisco Museum of Modern Art organized a solo exhibition in 2008 to debut Sietsema's third film, Figure 3. The artist's work also was included in the Carnegie International and the 5th Berlin Biennial in 2008, and later that year, the De Appel Arts Centre in Amsterdam mounted a survey exhibition, “Paul Sietsema: Three Films,” featuring Untitled (Beautiful Place), Empire, and Figure 3.

In 2009, the Museum of Modern Art in New York presented a solo exhibition of Sietsema's work, and the Reina Sofia in Madrid mounted a solo exhibition of Sietsema's films and drawings. That same year, Sietsema moved to Berlin on a DAAD residency, and in 2010 he had a solo show at the Schinkel Pavillon, which featured his 16mm film Anticultural Positions, in 2010.

Upon returning to Los Angeles from Berlin in 2011, Sietsema began teaching in the graduate department at the Roski School of Fine Arts at the University of Southern California as a visiting core faculty member. He continued to teach at USC for three years before deciding to devote his time to being an advisor in post-graduate studies at the Rijksakademie in Amsterdam at the urging of Dan Graham, who had been involved with the school for many years, along with Joan Jonas. Sietsema continues to hold this advisory position today.

The artist's first solo show with Matthew Marks Gallery took place in New York in 2011, and the Kunsthalle Basel organized a solo exhibition in 2012. Sietsema and the Kunsthalle Basel exhibition's curator, Adam Szymczyk, collaborated with writer Quinn Latimer and designer Manuel Raeder on a book of collected interviews in conjunction with the exhibition, Paul Sietsema: interviews on films and works.

The Wexner Center for the Arts in Columbus, Ohio, organized a survey exhibition spanning five years of work in 2013, which travelled to the Museum of Contemporary Art in Chicago.

Sietsema mounted his next exhibition at Matthew Marks Gallery in New York in 2014. The show featured his new 35mm film Abstract Composition. The Nouveau Musée National de Monaco's Villa Paloma presented an exhibition of new paintings and a recent film, At the hour of tea in Monaco in 2015, and in 2016, the artist had his first one-person exhibition in Los Angeles in nearly fifteen years, at Matthew Marks Gallery.

== Films ==
Since the late 1990s, Sietsema has created nine 16mm films and one 35mm film.

Sietsema's most recent 16mm film, At the hour of Tea, debuted in his survey exhibition organized by the Wexner Center for the Arts. The film presents five sequences that explore varied configurations of objects from various eras arranged on a desktop. The vignettes move from groupings of collectable objects of contemplation—Roman glass, ancient coins, Victorian fans—to the everyday objects of an office space—phone, pen, typewriter, money. Several views of each vignette are followed by an image of a still photograph of the scene deposited in a desktop inbox. Within the typewriter, the film traces the written description of a historical painting, one paragraph at a time.

Empire (2002), his most well-known film, centers around an image of art critic Clement Greenberg's living room as pictured in a 1964 issue of Vogue magazine. Sietsema recreated the room and its contents within his studio and filmed the space in 16mm film. Greenberg's space, along with the books and artworks within it, formed the point of departure for a series of vignettes examining various avant-garde movements throughout history. The unnatural construction of these seemingly absolute histories form the framework for many of Sietsema's films.

Abstract Composition, the artist's first 35mm film, focuses on a cardboard sign rotating in space, displaying a brief description of a different object with each rotation. The phrases conjure images of the collectible objects they describe. The punched dot letters of the sign are part of the infrastructural aesthetics that exist for manufacturing—a sublanguage within automated industrial production. The film itself is an automated system of rendering each phrase.

Related to Sietsema's paintings and drawings, a black and white film from 2012 titled Encre chine depicts picture frames, paint brushes, a film camera, and other artists’ tools covered in black ink, an interference that explores the deterioration of objects through mediation and the intersection of the tools and products of art.

An earlier film, Anticultural Positions, originally presented as a “lecture” at the New School in New York in place of the artist being present himself, intersperses images of the stained tabletops of Sietsema's studio with an appropriated text by the artist Jean Dubuffett, adapted to describe Sietsema's own work. The film examines the presentation of unintentional marks from the artist's studio as possibly intentional artworks, as well as a confusion of aesthetics and philosophies from different eras being read as contemporary.

For Sietsema's first film, Untitled (Beautiful Place), he made a series of hyperrealistic plants, drawn from images of plants and flowers he had collected over many years, and shot them with different dead-stock 16mm films, both in black and white and in color, in order to demonstrate “an array of stylistic influences based on the sort of history of photography.” He has said of this work, “The structures I have made for the films usually explore different clichéd aspects of the overall categories I start with. In Untitled (Beautiful Place), I was interested in shared ideas of beauty, the visual.”

== Drawings and Paintings ==
The imagery of Sietsema's paintings encompasses the tools of artistic production: from the hammer and chisel, to the icons of the digital desktop. Newspapers, magazines, coins and currency are also subjects addressing systems of cultural exchange and proliferation. Images of real world equivalents of Photoshop's paintbrush, Microsoft Word's sheet of paper and email's envelope drowned in pools of enamel are rendered in that same material on the backs of found canvases, which he often sources from obscure online auction websites. A reel of film, an art magazine and the artist's pen and notebook encased in a pool of paint on an old newspaper have been depicted in his drawings and paintings.

== Exhibitions ==
Solo exhibitions of Sietsema's work have been organized by:

- De Appel Arts Centre, Amsterdam
- Drawing Room, London
- Kunsthalle Basel, Basel
- Midway Contemporary Art, Minneapolis
- Museo Nacional Centro de Arte Reina Sofía, Madrid
- Museum of Contemporary Arts, Denver
- The Museum of Modern Art, New York
- Nouveau Musée National de Monaco, Monaco
- San Francisco Museum of Modern Art
- Schinkel Pavillon, Berlin
- Wexner Center for the Arts, Columbus, OH
- Whitney Museum of American Art

He also participated in Sonsbeek 9, Arnhem, Netherlands (2001); The 1st Auckland Triennial (2001); Second Moscow Biennial (2003); the 55th Carnegie International, Carnegie Museum of Art, Pittsburgh (2008); and the 5th Berlin Biennial for Contemporary Art (2008).

== Selected Collections ==
- Berkeley Art Museum and Pacific Film Archive, University of California, Berkeley, CA
- Carnegie Museum of Art, Pittsburgh
- Centre Georges Pompidou, Paris
- Dallas Museum of Art
- The Fonds régionaux d’art contemporain/Le Plateau, Paris
- Hammer Museum, Los Angeles
- Metropolitan Museum of Art, New York
- Museo Nacional Centro de Arte Reina Sofia, Madrid
- Museum of Contemporary Art, Los Angeles
- The Museum of Modern Art, New York
- San Francisco Museum of Modern Art
- Tate Gallery, London
- Walker Art Center, Minneapolis
- Whitney Museum of American Art, New York

== Publications ==
2016

- Battista, Emiliano, Eva Fabbris, and Tim Griffin. Fifty-three Works by Paul Sietsema. Milan: Mousse Publishing, 2016.

2014

- Sietsema, Paul. At the hour of tea. San Francisco: RITE Editions and Sternberg Press, 2014.
- Burnett Abrams, Nora, Michael Ned Holte, and Sarah Robayo Sheridan. Seven Films by Paul Sietsema. Milan: Mousse Publishing, 2014

2013

- Baker, George, Christopher Bedford, Bill Horrigan, Suzanne Hudson, and Paul Sietsema. Paul Sietsema. Columbus, OH: Wexner Center for the Arts, The Ohio State University, 2013.

2012

- Latimer, Quinn, ed. Paul Sietsema: Interviews on films and works. Berlin: Sternberg Press, 2012.
- Latimer, Quinn, and Adam Szymczyk. “Impossibly Clean Models: Paul Sietsema in Conversation,” in Paul Sietsema: Interviews on films and works, ed. Quinn Latimer (Berlin: Sternberg Press, 2012), pp. 89–108.

2009

- Butler, Cornelia. Figure 3: Paul Sietsema, New York: The Museum of Modern Art, 2009.

2003

- Iles, Chrissie. Empire: Paul Sietsema. New York: Whitney Museum of American Art, 2003.

2001

- Paul Sietsema. Construction of Vision. Arnhem, The Netherlands: Sonsbeek 9; Los Angeles, Regen Projects, 2001.

== Honors and awards ==
Sietsema received the Foundation for Contemporary Arts Grants to Artists award in 2002 and the Wexner Center Artist's Residency Award in 2010. He has been a Guggenheim Fellow since 2005 and a German Academic Exchange Service (DAAD) Fellow since 2008.
