= List of video artists =

This is a list of notable artists who create video art. Artists in this list have gained recognition or proven their importance because their work has been shown in film and video festivals and contemporary art exhibitions of worldwide importance, such as the documenta or the Venice Biennale, the Sao Paulo Art Biennial or exhibited in major modern or contemporary art museums and institutes.

Add names in alphabetical order.

A B C D E F G H I J K L M N O P Q R S T U V W X Y Z

== A ==
- Vito Acconci
- Gustavo Aguerre
- Eija-Liisa Ahtila
- Peggy Ahwesh
- Doug Aitken
- Madeleine Altmann
- J Tobias Anderson
- Ant Farm (group)
- Eleanor Antin
- Arambilet
- Martin Arnold
- Victor Arroyo
- Knut Asdam
- Kutlug Ataman

== B ==
- Lutz Bacher
- Trisha Baga
- Benton C Bainbridge
- John Baldessari
- George Barber
- Judith Barry
- Matthew Barney
- Yael Bartana
- Sylvie Bélanger
- Robin Bell
- Maurice Benayoun
- Lynda Benglis
- Sadie Benning
- Michael Betancourt
- Zarina Bhimji
- Janet Biggs
- Dara Birnbaum
- Skip Blumberg
- Angie Bonino
- Joan Braderman
- Marco Brambilla
- Candice Breitz
- Olaf Breuning
- Klaus vom Bruch
- Bull.Miletic
- Chris Burden
- Nia Burks
- V. Owen Bush

== C ==
- Peter Callas
- Colin Campbell
- Peter Campus
- Cao Fei
- Paul Chan
- Bruce Charlesworth
- Cheng Ran
- Cheryl (artist collective)
- Mary Helena Clark
- Pierre Yves Clouin
- Nicole Cohen
- Tony Cokes
- James Coleman
- Jordi Colomer
- Cecelia Condit
- Tony Conrad
- Petra Cortright
- Chris Cunningham
- Andrea Crespo

== D ==
- Douglas Davis
- Heiko Daxl
- Manon de Boer
- Anouk De Clercq
- Dimitri Devyatkin
- Malaka Dewapriya
- Willie Doherty
- Cecilia Dougherty
- Stan Douglas
- Juan Downey

== E ==
- Ed Emshwiller
- Shahram Entekhabi
- Bill Etra
- Valie Export

== F ==
- Ingrid Falk
- Omer Fast
- Ken Feingold
- Judy Fiskin
- Sadaf Foroughi
- Iain Forsyth and Jane Pollard
- Terry Fox
- Anna Frants
- Howard Fried
- Yang Fudong
- Ingeborg Fülepp
- Richard Fung

== G ==
- Frank Gillette
- Judith Goddard
- Douglas Gordon
- Sigurður Guðjónsson
- Genco Gulan
- Sharon Grace
- Rodney Graham
- Antonio Jose Guzman

== H ==
- David Hall
- Doug Hall
- Michelle Handelman
- Lynn Hershman Leeson
- Gary Hill
- Nan Hoover
- G. H. Hovagimyan
- Claire Hooper
- Madelon Hooykaas
- Ali Hossaini
- Teresa Hubbard / Alexander Birchler
- Judith Huemer
- Pierre Huyghe

== J ==
- Arthur Jafa
- Christian Jankowski
- Amy Jenkins
- Joan Jonas
- Stephen Jones
- Isaac Julien
- Jesper Just

== K ==
- Wolf Kahlen
- Mike Kelley
- Soun-Gui Kim
- Olga Kisseleva
- Eva Koch
- Igor Kopystiansky
- Svetlana Kopystiansky
- Beryl Korot
- Marlene Kos
- Paul Kos
- Mitchell Kriegman
- Paul Kuniholm

== L ==
- Tony Labat
- Ine Lamers
- Maria Lassnig
- Lennie Lee
- LIA
- Kalup Linzy
- Liu Dao
- Lohner Carlson
- Rafael Lozano-Hemmer
- Mary Lucier
- Cecilia Lundqvist

== M ==
- Cynthia Maughan
- Paul McCarthy
- Jennifer & Kevin McCoy
- Laurie MacDonald
- Christina McPhee
- Steve McQueen
- Bjørn Melhus
- Ana Mendieta
- Eric Millikin
- Jonathan Monaghan
- Joshua Mosley
- MTAA

== N ==
- Shuli Nachshon
- Bruce Nauman
- Ray Navarro
- Shirin Neshat
- Graham Nicholls
- Danièle Nyst
- Jacques Louis Nyst

== O ==
- Arthur Omar
- Orlan
- Tony Oursler
- Yoko Ono

== P ==
- Nam June Paik
- Slobodan Pajic
- Laura Parnes
- Stephen Partridge
- Stefano Pasquini
- Relja Penezic
- Paul Pfeiffer
- Angelica Porrari

== R ==
- Jon Rafman
- Charles Recher
- Daniel Reeves
- Jeanette Reinhardt
- Kelly Richardson
- Pipilotti Rist
- Don Ritter
- Miroslaw Rogala
- David Rokeby
- Julian Rosefeldt
- Martha Rosler

== S ==
- Domingo Sarrey
- Peter Sarkisian
- Carolee Schneemann
- Ira Schneider
- Joseph Seigenthaler
- Shigeko Kubota
- Shelly Silver
- Lorna Simpson
- Ture Sjölander
- Guy Richards Smit
- Michael Snow
- Lisa Steele
- Jana Sterbak
- Mitch Stratten
- System D-128
- Surekha

== T ==
- Tim Tate
- Sam Taylor-Wood
- Diana Thater
- Francesc Torres
- Gianni Toti
- Ryan Trecartin
- Wu Tsang
- Rob Tyler

== V ==
- Anne-Mie van Kerckhoven
- Minnette Vári
- Steina and Woody Vasulka
- Bill Viola
- Barbara Visser
- Wolf Vostell

== W ==
- Mark Wallinger
- Andy Warhol
- Gillian Wearing
- Peter Weibel
- Monika Weiss
- Pola Weiss Álvarez
- Roger Welch
- Tim White-Sobieski
- Andrew Norman Wilson
- Jane and Louise Wilson
- Shaun Wilson
- Krzysztof Wodiczko
- Jordan Wolfson

== Z ==
- Lydia Zimmermann
