= Abortion in Belgium =

Abortion in Belgium was fully legalised on 4 April 1990, following the temporary resignation of King Baudouin on grounds of conscience.

The procedure is legal until 12 weeks after conception (14 weeks after the pregnant woman's last menstrual period). The pregnant woman is required to receive counselling at least six days prior to the abortion and to check in with her doctor to monitor her health in the weeks after the procedure. Later abortions are permitted if there is a serious risk to the woman's health or if a risk of birth defects is identified in the fetus.

== Overview ==
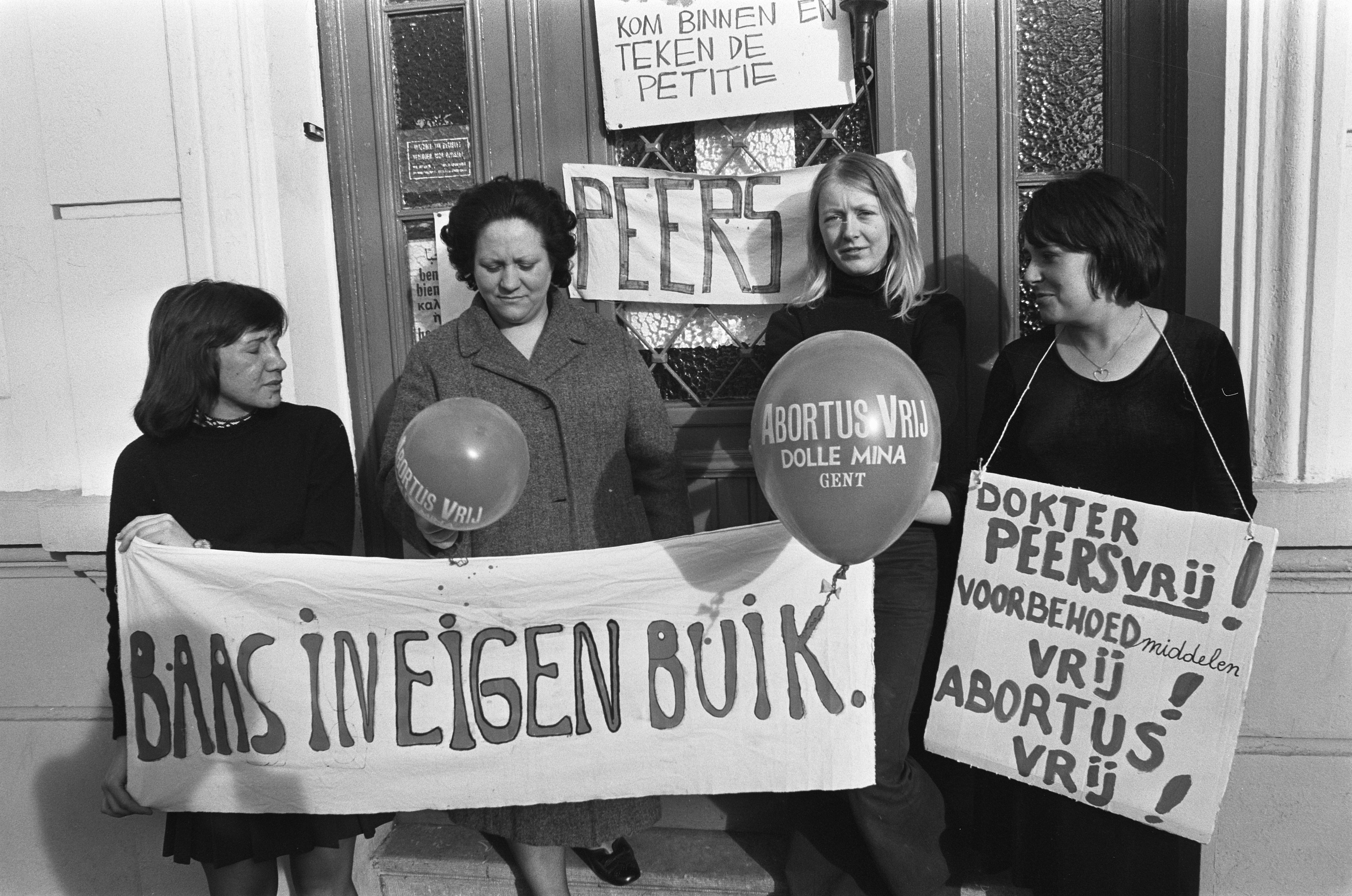
Hunger strike in Ghent in January 1973 by members of the Dolle Mina group for the right to abortion and against the arrest of Dr. Willy Peers.

Abortion in Belgium was first prohibited without exception by Articles 348 to 353 of the Belgian Criminal Code of 1867. Abortion was then defined as one of the crimes "against the order of families and against public morality". However, very few prosecutions of abortions took place until 1923, when a bill originally submitted by Henry Carton de Wiart from the Catholic Party in 1913 (but not formally debated until after World War I) was passed by the Belgian Parliament to formally state legal penalties for incitement to abortion as well as advertising and promotion of contraception. 'Therapeutic abortions' took place in 1940 in some hospitals, while others were performed in the 1960s by some family planning centres in the French-speaking regions of Belgium.

In 1970, gynaecologist Dr. Willy Peers (fr; nl) founded the Belgian Society for the Legalisation of Abortion (SBLA). In that same year, the National Council of Belgian Women organised a debate on abortion and networks were being set up to enable women to terminate their pregnancies. The Marie Mineur group in Wallonia connected women with doctors who performed abortions, while the Dolle Mina group in Flanders took women to the Netherlands to seek abortions. In 1971, the Callewaert Law was tabled in an attempt to decriminalise abortion in Belgium for the first time, but was unsuccessful.

On 18 January 1973, Dr. Peers was arrested for performing more than 300 abortions in the Namur region. He spent 34 days in prison; demonstrations for his release and in favour of a revision of the law were attended by several hundred thousand people. The mobilisation gave rise to a 'judicial truce' by which prosecutors agreed not to prosecute doctors for performing abortions.

Between 1974 and 1978 there was a deadlock in political debates about abortion. During the same period, some abortions were unofficially permitted (and even reimbursed by some mutualities) as long as they were registered as 'curettage'. It was estimated that 20,000 abortions were performed each year, and the number of clandestine abortions performed during the same period were also estimated to be as high as 74,000-150,000 (in comparison to 100,000 annual births). New advocacy groups for the legalisation of abortion were created, such as the Committees for the Decriminalisation of Abortion in 1976, the Committee for the Suspension of Legal Proceedings in 1978, and the Action Group of Out-of-Hospital Abortion Centres (GACEHPA) in the same year. The truce was finally ended in 1978 by several prosecutors' offices. A collective trial against several doctors and a psychologist took place in Brussels in 1983.

== 1990 constitutional dispute ==
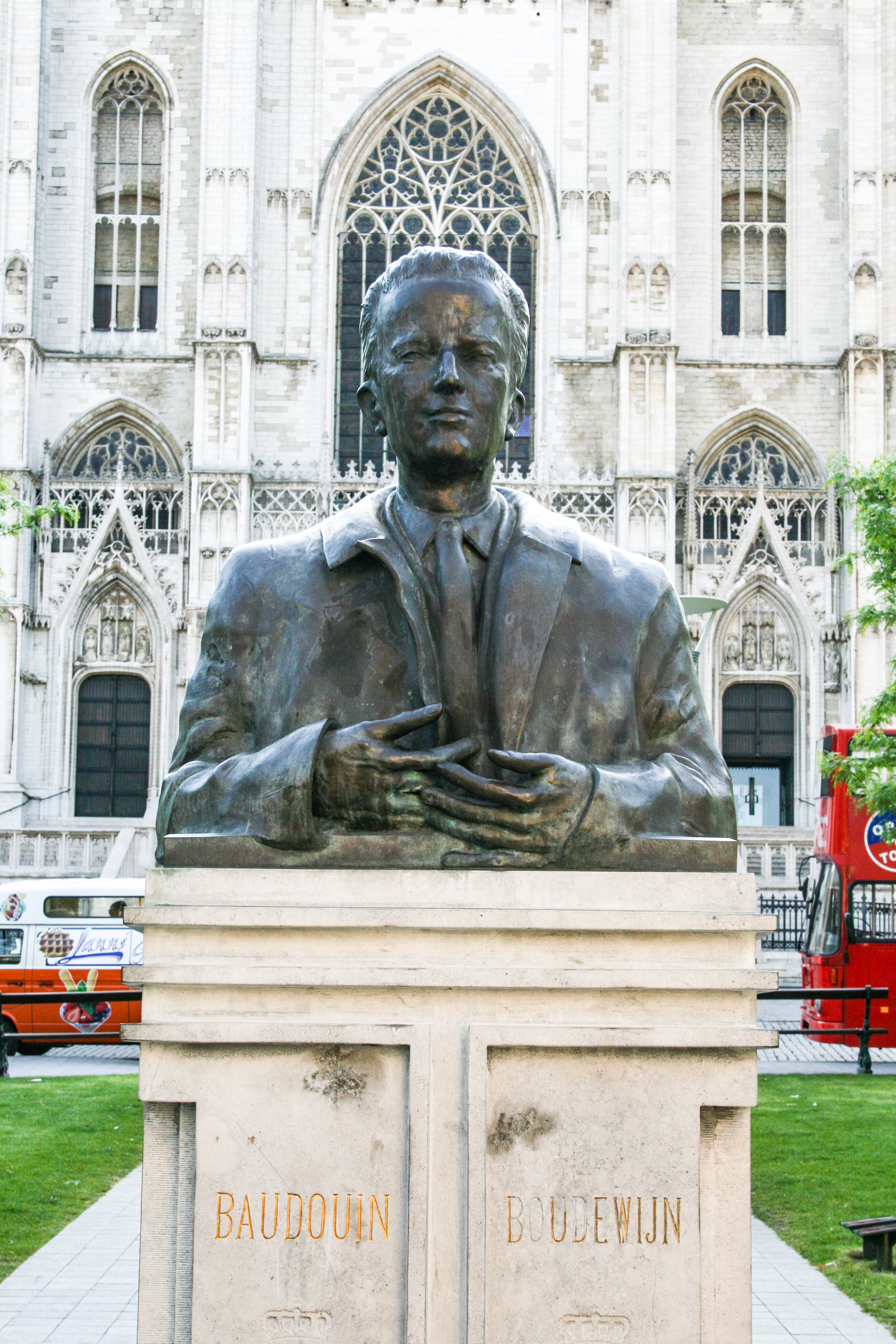
Sculpture of King Baudouin outside the Cathedral of St. Michael and St. Gudula, Brussels

Due to the influence of the Catholic Church, and the personal faith of King Baudouin, Belgium remained one of a small number of European countries where abortion was illegal after liberal changes in the law in other jurisdictions in the 1960s and 1970s. When the law liberalising abortion was enacted, it was controversial to many Belgians.

A bill to liberalise abortion was first submitted by Senators Lucienne Herman-Michielsens and Roger Lallemand in early 1990, and despite the opposition of the ruling Christian People's Party, the bill was passed with the support of a coalition of the left-wing Socialistische Partij and Parti Socialiste parties, and liberal parties in the Chamber of Representatives.

The Episcopal Conference of Belgium, representing the country's Catholic bishops, appealed to the population at large with a public statement that expounded Roman Catholic opposition to the law on doctrinal and pastoral grounds. At that time, 75% of the Belgian population was Catholic by baptism, although Mass attendance was only around 18%.

The bishops warned Belgian Catholics that anyone who co-operated "effectively and directly" in the procurement of abortions was "excluding themselves from the ecclesiastical community." Motivated by the strong stance of the Belgian bishops, and the fact that he and his wife Queen Fabiola had not been able to bear any children themselves, King Baudouin notified the Prime Minister, Wilfried Martens, on 30 March 1990 that he could not sign the law without violating his conscience as a Catholic.

Since the legislation would not have the force of law without the king's signature (royal assent), his refusal to sign created the potential for a constitutional crisis. However, the problem was resolved by an agreement between the King and Prime Minister Martens, by which the Belgian Government used a constitutional mechanism which declared the King unable to govern, assumed his authority and enacted the law “in the name of the Belgian people”, after which Parliament voted to reinstate the King on the following day.

The Holy See described the king's action as a "noble and courageous choice" dictated by a "very strong moral conscience". Liberal critics of King Baudouin have suggested that his action was "little more than a gesture" as he was reinstated as king just 44 hours after he was removed from power. The King's letter on the issue, to Prime Minister Martens, is displayed in the BELvue Museum in Brussels.

Baudouin died in 1993 and Pope John Paul II paid respects at his grave in the Church of Our Lady of Laeken during an official visit to the country in 1995. The legalisation of abortion was followed by the legalisation of euthanasia in 2002.

== Current law ==
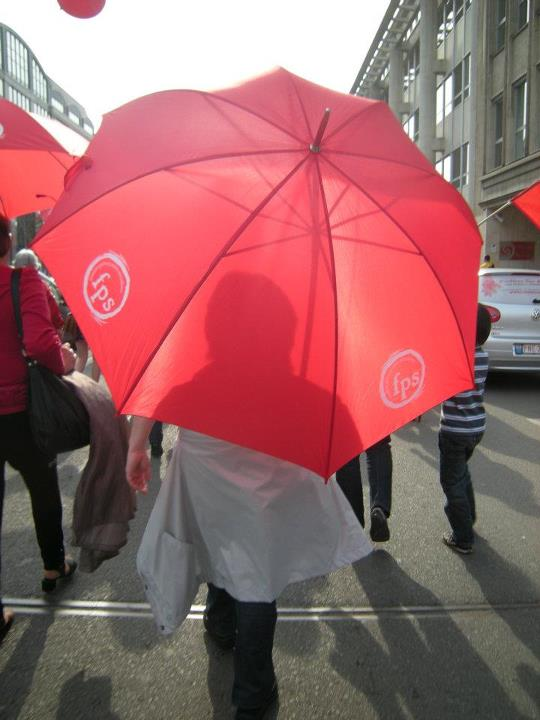
Protest for abortion rights in Brussels, 2012

The current Belgian abortion law dates from 15 October 2018, when the first government of Prime Minister Charles Michel removed abortus provocatus from the Criminal Code and placed it into a separate law. In this revision, while several sanctions would de jure remain in place, the concept of 'emergency' would disappear. With regard to the 'cooling-off period', the six days could be added to the twelve-week period, and would also lapse in the event of urgent medical reasons. Also, a doctor who refused to perform an abortion would be required to refer the patient to another doctor.

This bill was submitted together with a bill on the recognition of miscarriage for civil status, intended to help parents with the psychological suffering caused by a miscarriage.

Opposition parties submitted bills to completely decriminalise abortion and to include abortion in a law on patients' rights. In those proposals, the legal term limit would be increased to 18 weeks and the reflection period would be shortened to 48 hours, compared to six days. Women seeking an abortion after 12 weeks have travelled to neighbouring countries where longer term limits apply such as France (14 weeks) or the Netherlands (24 weeks). However, a 12-week limit with medical emergency exceptions is the norm in most European jurisdictions allowing abortion.

== Statistics ==
In 2009, the abortion rate in Belgium was 9.2 abortions per 1,000 women aged 15–44 years. In 2021, the abortion rate in Belgium was 7.77 abortions per 1,000 women aged 15-44 years. In 2021, 16.701 abortions were carried out, and in 2020 it was 16.585. In 2021 the average age of someone that got an abortion was 29 years old. Belgium has one of the lowest abortion rates with teenage pregnancies.

== Public opinion ==
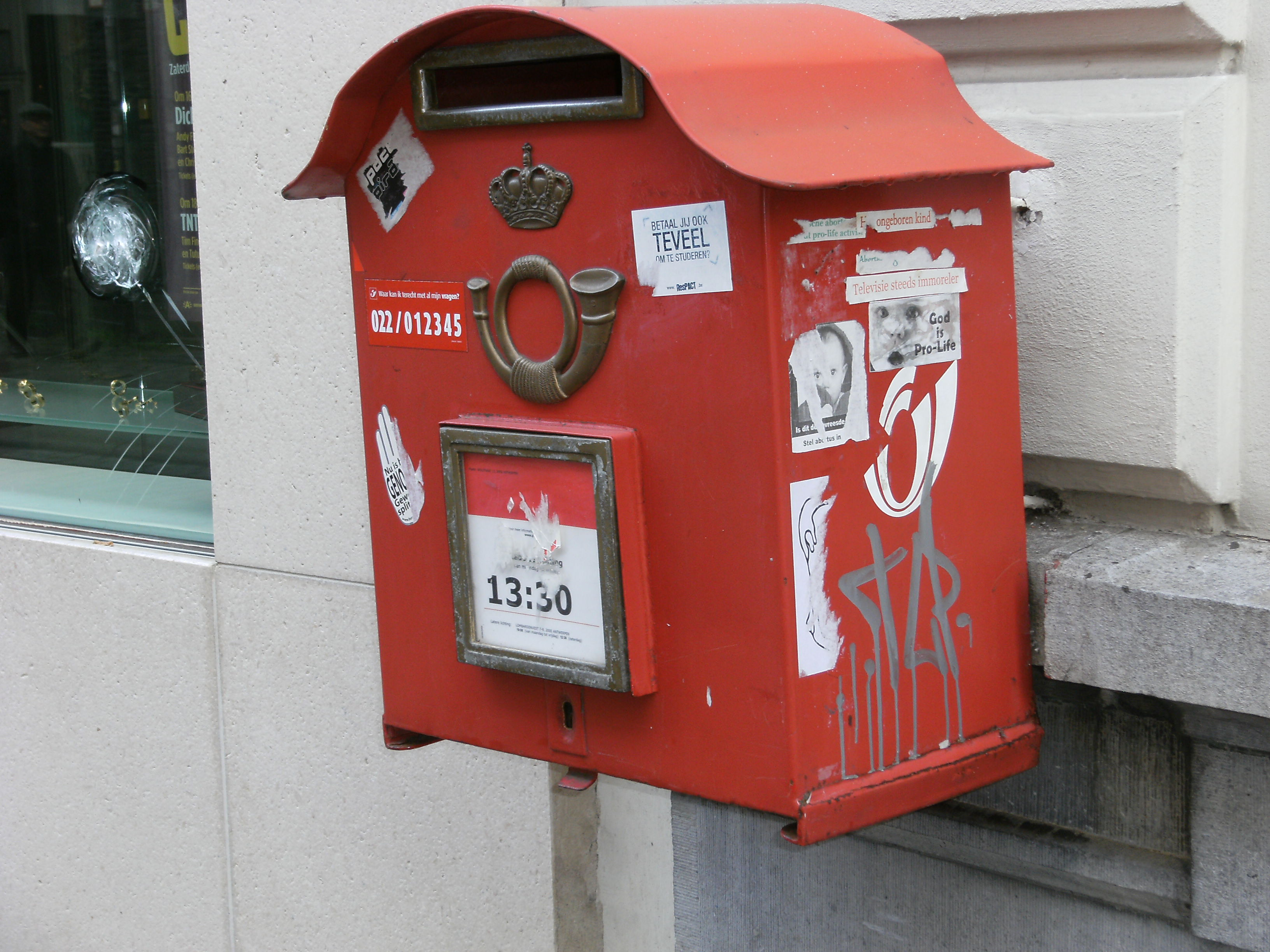
Mailbox with anti-abortion messages in Antwerp, 2010.

In a survey carried out by the secularist group Centre d'action laïque in 2018, 75.4% of respondents stated that abortion should not be a crime, 16.6% disagreed, and 5.7% said they are neither for nor against, and 2.3% were unable or unwilling to provide an answer. An annual March for Life takes place in Brussels.
