= Peter Sarkisian =

American video and multimedia artist (born 1965)

Peter Sarkisian (1965-April 26, 2025) was an American new media artist based in Santa Fe, New Mexico.He combined video projection and sculpture to create hybrid-format, multi-media installations.

Sarkisian had exhibited at several museums around the globe, including the San Francisco Museum of Modern Art, the Picasso Museum in Antibes, France and the Whitney Museum of American Art.

== Overview ==
Peter Sarkisian's art lies at the intersection of film, video and sculpture. He began his career as a filmmaker in the late 1980s, studying direction at the California Institute of the Arts and the American Film Institute before working in the film industry in Los Angeles. By 1994, his interests had grown to include video sculpture, and in 1996 he began working with video projection, producing a number of spatial installations in order to challenge the moving image, as well as its standardized format.

Sarkisian was known for producing multi-media installations that blur the line between what is tangible and what is imagined. His video installations are designed to create perceptual conflicts between image, contour and surface, thereby allowing the viewer to draw multiple visual conclusions while reconsidering the medium of video itself. The relationship between viewer and viewed, and ultimately the dynamic between the two, is the focal point of Sarkisian's art.

== Major works and exhibition highlights ==
In 1997 Sarkisian had his first solo museum exhibition at Site Santa Fe, in which curator Louis Grachos included an installation by Sarkisian with works by Bill Viola, Gary Hill, Tony Oursler and others. The piece exhibited, titled "I don’t want it; take it back", featured multiple projections of a large hand intertwined with a ball in physical space.

In 1998, Sarkisian premiered one of his seminal works, "Dusted", at I-20 Gallery in New York. In this piece, five conjoined projections unfold around the sides of a 33-inch cube, inside of which a man and woman appear to move slowly about. The opacity of the cube gradually yields to transparency as their bodies brush away a layer of soot from its inner surface, thereby revealing a murky view of the interior. This process in turn soils the figures inside and causes them to disappear proportionally.

In 1999 "Dusted’’ was shown at the Edinburgh College of Art as part of the Edinburgh International Festival in Scotland. The cube has since traveled to numerous museums throughout the world, and multiples of the installation have been added to the permanent collections of the San Francisco Museum of Modern Art, the Ulrich Museum of Art, Wichita, and the Contemporary Art Museum in Kumamoto, Japan.

In 2000 the Picasso Museum in Antibes, France held a solo exhibition of Sarkisian’s installations in concurrence with a show of Pablo Picasso's work. That same year, Italian art critic and curator Achille Bonito Oliva included Sarkisian’s ‘’Dusted’’ along with installations by Yoko Ono, Peter Greenaway, Robert Wilson and others in his exhibition titled ‘’Stanze é Segreti’’, which took place at the Rotonda della Besana in Milan.

In 2001, Sarkisian exhibited along with Douglas Gordon, Bruce Nauman, Andy Warhol, John Baldessari and others in the exhibition titled ‘’Making Time: Considering Time as a Material in Contemporary Film and Video.’’ Curated by Amy Cappellazzo, the show was presented at the Palm Beach Institute of Contemporary Art in Lake Worth, Florida, then traveled to the Armand Hammer Museum in Los Angeles.

In 2002, Sarkisian was included in the Whitney Museum of American Art Biennale exhibition, curated by Lawrence Rinder. His contribution to the biennial was titled ‘’Hover’’, the second in a series of installations involving conjoined projections unfolding around the sides of a 33-inch cube. Also that year, Sarkisian exhibited work at the Contemporary Art Museum in Kumamoto, Japan, as well as in Mexico City at ‘’Vidarte 2002, Festival Internacional de Video y Artes Electrónicas’’.

In 2003, Sarkisian’s work was included by curator Dan Cameron as part of the Eighth International Istanbul Biennial in Istanbul, Turkey. Sarkisian’s installation, titled ‘’Bohr’s Atom’’, was commissioned for the biennial and explored Niels Bohr’s early observations concerning the quantum state of atoms.

In 2004, Sarkisian was tapped by Albright-Knox Art Gallery curator Louis Grachos to appear in ‘’Bodily Space: New Obsessions in Figurative Sculpture’’. His work was also exhibited at the Foundazione Ragghianti in Lucca, Italy as part of a traveling show titled ‘’Journey of the Motionless Man’’, which had originated at the Villa Croce Museum of Contemporary Art in Genova the previous year.

In 2005-2006, Sarkisian’s ‘’Dusted’’ was paired with Steve McQueen’s ‘’Drum Roll’’ in a two-person exhibition at the San Francisco Museum of Modern Art.

In 2007, Sarkisian debuted a new series titled ‘’Extruded Video Engine’’, in which the elements of video projection and three-dimensional vacuum formed screens were combined.

In 2008, works from the ‘’Extruded Video Engine’’ series were exhibited in solo shows at the Museum of Fine Arts (St. Petersburg, Florida) and the Contemporary Art Center, New Orleans. For the New Orleans show, Sarkisian used his video engines as a temporal mechanism through which to examine a one-year American media cycle, at whose exact midpoint Hurricane Katrina tore through the Gulf Coast.

In 2010, a retrospective of Sarkisian's work titled Peter Sarkisian: Video Works, 1996-2008 was shown at the University of Wyoming Art Museum, and traveled to the National Taiwan Museum of Fine Arts, Taipei.

== Cultural references ==
Sarkisian's 1999 work White Water was referenced in the season 2 premiere of True Detective.

== See also ==
- List of video artists
