= Pierre-Yves =

Pierre-Yves is a given name. Notable people with the name include:

- Pierre-Yves André (born 1974), retired French footballer
- Pierre-Yves Barré (1749–1832), French vaudevillist and songwriter
- Pierre-Yves Bény (born 1983), French gymnast
- Pierre-Yves Borgeaud, Swiss film director
- Pierre-Yves Bournazel (born 1977), French politician
- Pierre-Yves Cardinal, Canadian film and television actor
- Pierre Yves Clouin, video artist and filmmaker
- Pierre-Yves Collombat (born 1945), member of the Senate of France
- Pierre-Yves Corthals (born 1975), Belgian auto racing driver
- Pierre-Yves Gerbeau (born 1965), French businessman, based in the United Kingdom
- Pierre Yves Lenik (born 1958), French composer, known for his work in French documentaries
- Pierre-Yves Maillard (born 1968), Swiss politician of the Social Democratic Party
- Pierre-Yves Melançon, Canadian politician and a City Councillor in Montreal, Quebec
- Pierre-Yves Monette (born 1960), the former secretary-general of EUREAU
- Pierre-Yves Montagnat (born 1986), professional rugby union fullback or winger
- Pierre-Yves Ngawa (born 1992), Belgian footballer
- Pierre-Yves Oudeyer, Research Director at the French Institute for Research in Computer Science and Automation
- Pierre-Yves Pelletier, graphic designer, who has designed 110 stamps for Canada Post
- Pierre-Yves Plat (born 1980), French pianist who reinterprets classical masterpieces into jazz, ragtime, boogie, salsa and disco
- Pierre-Yves Polomat (born 1993), Martinique-born French footballer
- Pierre-Yves Roussel (born 1965), chairman and chief executive officer of LVMH Fashion Group
- Pierre-Yves Trémois (1921–2020), French visual artist and sculptor
- Joseph Philipp Pierre Yves Elliott Trudeau (1919–2000), the 15th Prime Minister of Canada (1968 to 1979 and 1980 to 1984)

== See also ==
- Pierre
- Yves (given name)
