= Baudouin of Belgium =

King of the Belgians from 1951 to 1993

Baudouin
- Servant of God
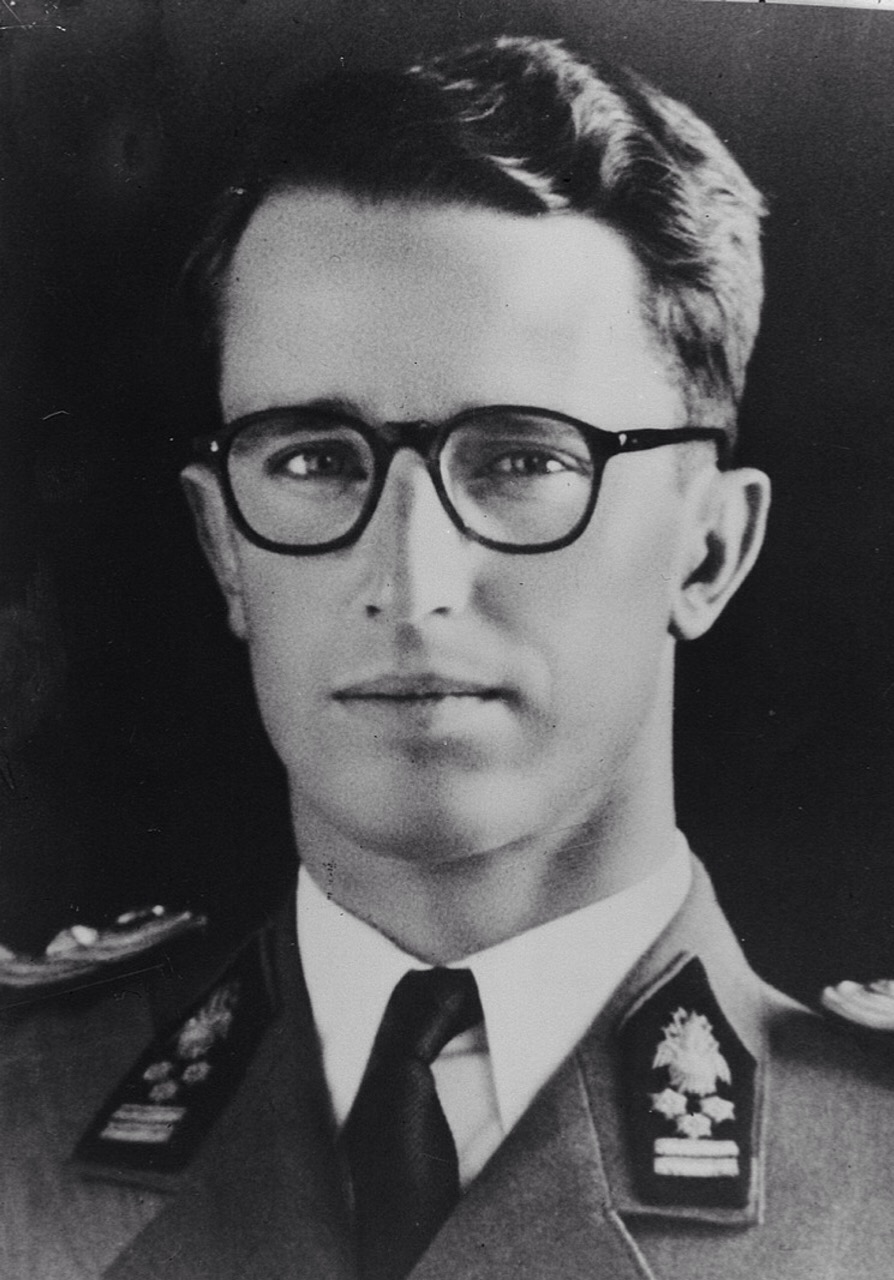
- Baudouin in 1960

King of the Belgians
- Reign: 17 July 1951 — 31 July 1993
- Predecessor: Leopold III
- Successor: Albert II
- Prime ministers: See list: Joseph Pholien; Jean Van Houtte; Achille Van Acker; Gaston Eyskens; Théo Lefèvre; Pierre Harmel; Paul Vanden Boeynants; Edmond Leburton; Leo Tindemans; Wilfried Martens; Mark Eyskens; Jean-Luc Dehaene

Regent of Belgium
- Regency: 11 August 1950 — 17 July 1951
- Monarch: Leopold III
- Born: 7 September 1930; Château of Stuyvenberg, Brussels, Belgium
- Died: 31 July 1993 (aged 62); Villa Astrida, Motril, Spain
- Burial: Church of Our Lady of Laeken
- Spouse: Fabiola de Mora y Aragón (m. 1960)
Names
- Dutch: Boudewijn Albert Karel Leopold Axel Maria Gustaaf; French: Baudouin Albert Charles Léopold Axel Marie Gustave; German: Balduin Albrecht Karl Leopold Axel Maria Gustav
- House: Belgium
- Father: Leopold III of Belgium
- Mother: Astrid of Sweden

Baudouin (Note: French: Baudouin Albert Charles Léopold Axel Marie Gustave, pronounced [bodwɛ̃ albɛʁ ʃaʁl leɔpɔld aksɛl maʁi ɡystav]; Dutch: Boudewijn Albert Karel Leopold Axel Maria Gustaaf, pronounced [ˈbʌudəʋɛin ˈɑlbərt ˈkaːrə ˈleːjoːpɔlt ˈɑksəl maːˈri ɣʏˈstaːf]; German: Balduin Albrecht Karl Leopold Axel Maria Gustav.) (US: /boʊˈdwæ̃/; 7 September 1930 – 31 July 1993) was King of the Belgians from 17 July 1951 until his death in 1993. He was the last Belgian king to be sovereign of the Congo, before it became independent in 1960 and became the Democratic Republic of the Congo (known from 1971 to 1997 as Zaire).

Baudouin was the elder son of King Leopold III (1901–1983) and his first wife, Princess Astrid of Sweden (1905–1935). Because he and his wife, Queen Fabiola, had no children, the crown passed to his younger brother, King Albert II, upon Baudouin's death.

In 2024, the Holy See opened the cause for his beatification and granted him the title Servant of God.

== Biography ==
=== Childhood ===
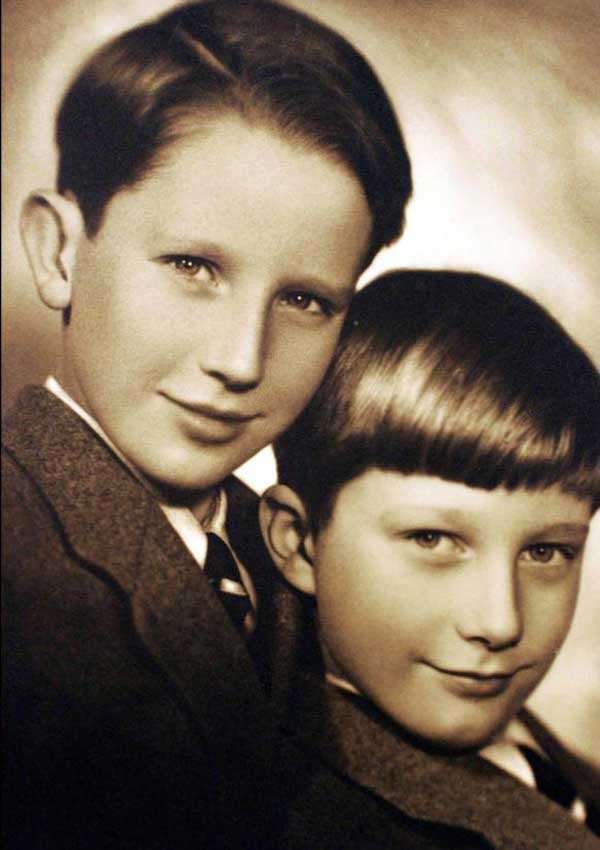
Prince Baudouin of Belgium (left) and his brother Prince Albert, c. 1940

Prince Baudouin was born on 7 September 1930 at the Château of Stuyvenberg in Laeken, northern Brussels, the elder son and second child of Prince Leopold, then Duke of Brabant, and his first wife, Princess Astrid of Sweden. In 1934, Baudouin's grandfather King Albert I of Belgium was killed in a rock climbing accident; Leopold became king and the three-year-old Baudouin became Duke of Brabant as heir apparent to the throne. When Baudouin was nearly five, his mother died in 1935 in Switzerland in a car accident that his father was driving. Later, in 1941, his father remarried to Mary Lilian Baels (later became Princess of Réthy). This marriage produced three more children: Prince Alexandre, Princess Marie-Christine (also Baudouin's goddaughter), and Princess Marie-Esméralda. Baudouin and his siblings had a close relationship with their stepmother, and they called her "Mother". His education began at the age of seven, his tutors taught him half his lessons in French and half in Dutch. He frequently accompanied his father to parades and ceremonies and became well known to the public.

Despite maintaining strict neutrality during the opening months of World War II, Nazi Germany invaded Belgium on 10 May 1940. Baudouin, his elder sister, Princess Josephine-Charlotte, and his younger brother, Prince Albert, were immediately sent to France for safety and then to Spain. The Belgian Army, assisted by the French and British, conducted a defensive campaign lasting 18 days, but Leopold, who had taken personal command, surrendered unconditionally on 28 May. Although the Belgian government escaped to form a Belgian government in exile, Leopold elected to remain in Belgium, and was placed under house arrest at the Palace of Laeken, from where he attempted to reach an understanding with the Germans, especially in respect of Belgian prisoners of war who were being held in Germany. The children returned to Laeken from Spain on 6 August.

Leopold had established a royal Scout group at the palace for his sons, whose members were drawn from the various Belgian Scout associations. In April 1943, the occupation forces banned the wearing of uniforms, and although Leopold was told the royal group was exempt, he insisted the ban apply to them too. However, Baudouin was about to be invested as a Scout and persuaded his father to delay the ban for one day so that the ceremony could take place.

Immediately following the Normandy landings in June 1944, the king, his wife, and the royal children, were deported to Hirschstein in Germany and then to Strobl in Austria from where they were released in May 1945 by the United States 106th Cavalry Regiment. However, the royal family were prevented from returning to Belgium by the "Royal Question" over whether Leopold had collaborated with the Nazis; the surrender in 1940, his refusal to join the government-in-exile, his fruitless visit to Adolf Hitler at the Berghof in November 1940 and his unconstitutional marriage to Lilian whose father was believed to be pro-Nazi. Until a political solution could be found, the king's brother, Prince Charles, became regent and the royal family lived at the Château du Reposoir in Pregny-Chambésy, Switzerland. Baudouin continued his education at a secondary school in Geneva and visited the United States in 1948.

=== Reign ===
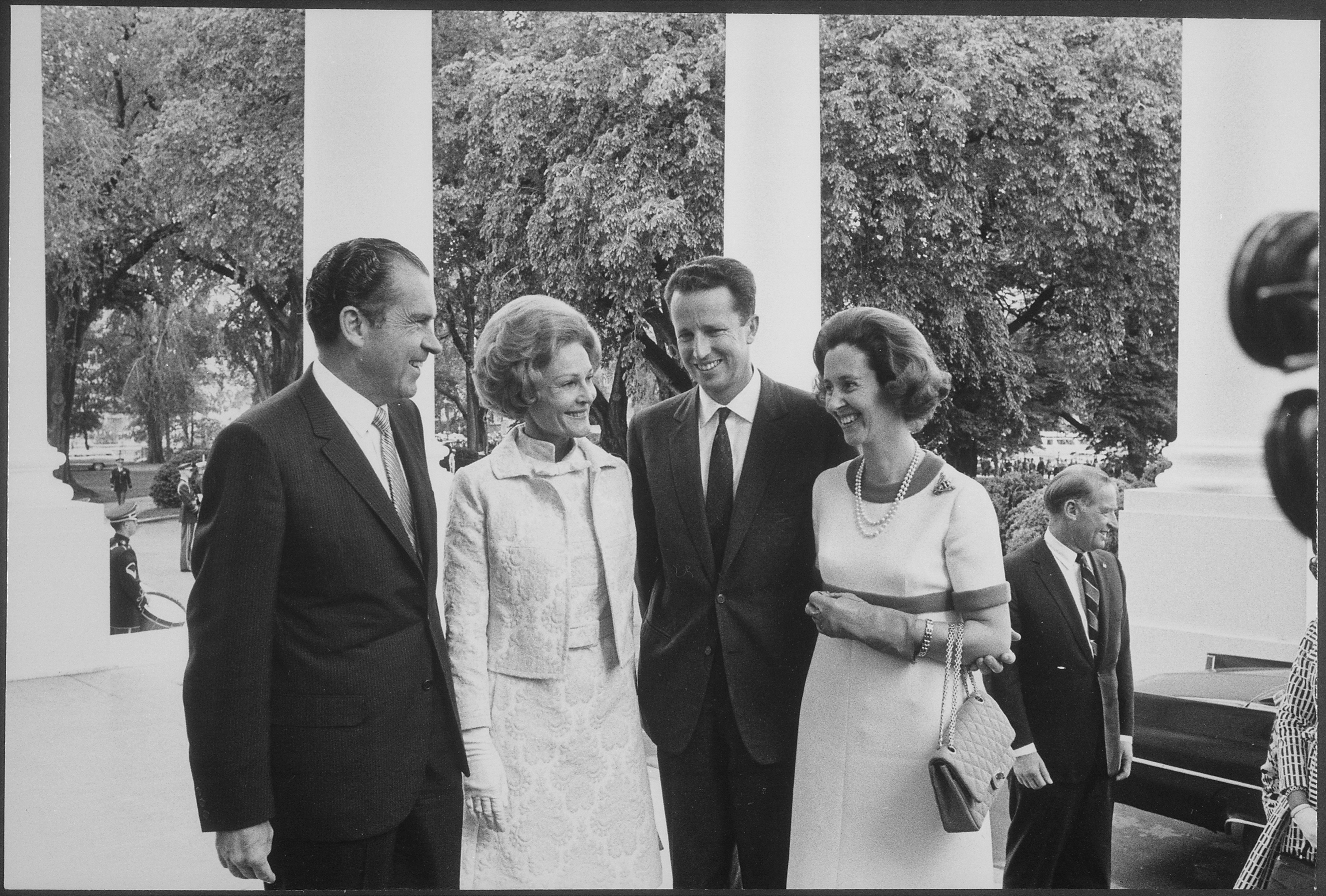
Baudouin and Fabiola with US President Richard Nixon and First Lady Pat Nixon in May 1969

In a referendum in March 1950, the public narrowly voted for King Leopold III to return from Switzerland, and he was recalled on 4 June 1950. However, parliamentary dissent and public protests forced Leopold to delegate his powers to Baudouin on 11 August 1950, and finally to abdicate in favour of Baudouin, who took the oath of office as King of the Belgians on 17 July 1951. In 1960, Baudouin declared the Belgian colony of Congo independent. During the parade following the last ceremonial inspection of the Force Publique, Ambroise Boimbo momentarily stole the king's royal sabre. The photograph, taken by Robert Lebeck, was widely published in world newspapers, with some seeing the act as a humiliation for the king.

==== Death of Patrice Lumumba ====
During the Congolese declaration of independence, Baudouin delivered a highly contested speech in which he celebrated the acts of the first Belgian owner of the Congo, King Leopold II, whom he described as "a genius". At the same event, the first democratically elected prime minister of Congo, Patrice Lumumba, gave a blistering response with a speech that was highly critical of the Belgian regime. Lumumba cited the killings of many Congolese, as well as the insults, humiliation, and slavery they experienced.

Lumumba's speech infuriated Baudouin and generated significant conflict between the two men. After Congo's independence, the natural resource-rich Katanga Province orchestrated a secession that received substantial military and financial support from the Belgian government, as well as from Belgian companies with business interests in Katanga. Baudouin strengthened his relationships with the Katangese politician Moise Tshombé, whom he made a Knight in the Belgian Order of Leopold. In the meantime, Belgium's government, as well as the CIA, supported or organized plots to assassinate Lumumba.

In early December 1960, Lumumba and two colleagues, Maurice Mpolo and Joseph Okito, who had planned to help him set up a new government, were imprisoned in military barracks about 150 kilometres (93 mi) from Leopoldville. They were underfed and mistreated, per Mobutu Sese Seko's orders. Lumumba registered his objections, writing directly to Indian and U.N. diplomat Rajeshwar Dayal, "in a word, we are living amid absolutely impossible conditions; moreover, they are against the law". Lumumba and his associates were released in mid-January 1961. Within hours, the Congolese military recaptured them, transported them to Katanga, and handed them over to Katangese authorities. They were beaten by Katangese officers, and on January 17, they were executed on the orders of the Katangese leadership. The execution took place in the presence of Katangese President Tshombe, two Katangese ministers and Belgian officials. The firing squad was reportedly commanded by a Belgian Julien Gat. Lumumba was buried in a shallow grave but his body was later exhumed by Belgian police officer Gerard Soete who dismembered Lumumba's body, and dissolved the corpse in acid.

In 2001, a parliamentary investigation set up by the Belgian government concluded that Baudouin, amongst others, was informed of the assassination scheme developed by Mobutu and Tshombé. Both men had conspired with a Belgian colonel, Guy Weber, to "neutralise Lumumba, if possible physically." The king was informed of the plot, but did nothing to oppose the murder. The parliamentary investigation described his lack of intervention as "incriminating", although it found no conclusive evidence that the king ordered the specifics of the plans.

In June 2025, Baudouin's close associate Étienne Davignon, a former Belgian junior diplomat to Congo, was requested to be tried for war crimes for his alleged involvement in the unlawful detention, deprivation of a fair trial, and torture of Lumumba in September 1960. In March 2026, judges at the Brussels Criminal Court’s Council Chamber decided that Davignon would stand trial, but he died in May 2026 at age 93 before the trial could occur.

==== Western engagements and later reign ====
As the head of state of Belgium, Baudouin, along with French President Charles de Gaulle, was one of the prominent world leaders at the state funerals of two American presidents, John F. Kennedy in November 1963 and his predecessor Dwight D. Eisenhower in March 1969. At Kennedy's funeral, Baudouin was accompanied by Paul-Henri Spaak, the Minister of Foreign Affairs and former three-time Prime Minister of Belgium. At Eisenhower's funeral, his next visit to the United States, he was accompanied by Prime Minister Gaston Eyskens.

In 1976, on the occasion of his silver jubilee, the King Baudouin Foundation was formed to improve the living conditions of the Belgian people.

== Death and funeral ==
Baudouin died from a heart attack on 31 July 1993, while on holiday at the Villa Astrida in the southern Spanish town of Motril, after a 42-year reign. Although in March 1992 the king had been operated on for a mitral valve prolapse in Paris, his death still came unexpectedly, and sent much of Belgium into a period of deep mourning. His death notably stopped the 1993 24 Hours of Spa sports car race, which had reached 15 hours when the news broke.

Within hours, the gates and enclosure of the royal palace were covered with flowers that people brought spontaneously. A viewing of the body was held at the Royal Palace in central Brussels; 500,000 people (5% of the population) came to pay their respects. Many waited in line up to 14 hours in sweltering heat to see their king one last time. The funeral service was attended by other European monarchs, including Queen Elizabeth II (the only international state funeral she attended in person as monarch), alongside Emperor Akihito of Japan. Non-royal guests included more than twenty presidents and leaders. Only two reigning heads of state of sovereign states at the time were not invited: Saddam Hussein, and Mobutu, the first due to the Gulf War, the latter due to him being declared persona non grata partly thanks to Mobutu exposing information about Baudouin's brother and sister-in-law. The presidents and leaders who did attend the funeral included UN Secretary-General Boutros Boutros-Ghali, European Commission President Jacques Delors, French President François Mitterrand, Egyptian President Hosni Mubarak, German President Richard von Weizsäcker, Polish President Lech Wałęsa, Bosnian President Alija Izetbegović, Italian President Oscar Luigi Scalfaro, Canadian Governor General Ray Hnatyshyn and former US President Gerald Ford.

King Baudouin was interred in the royal vault at the Church of Our Lady of Laeken in Brussels. His younger brother succeeded him as King Albert II.

== Personal life ==
=== Marriage ===
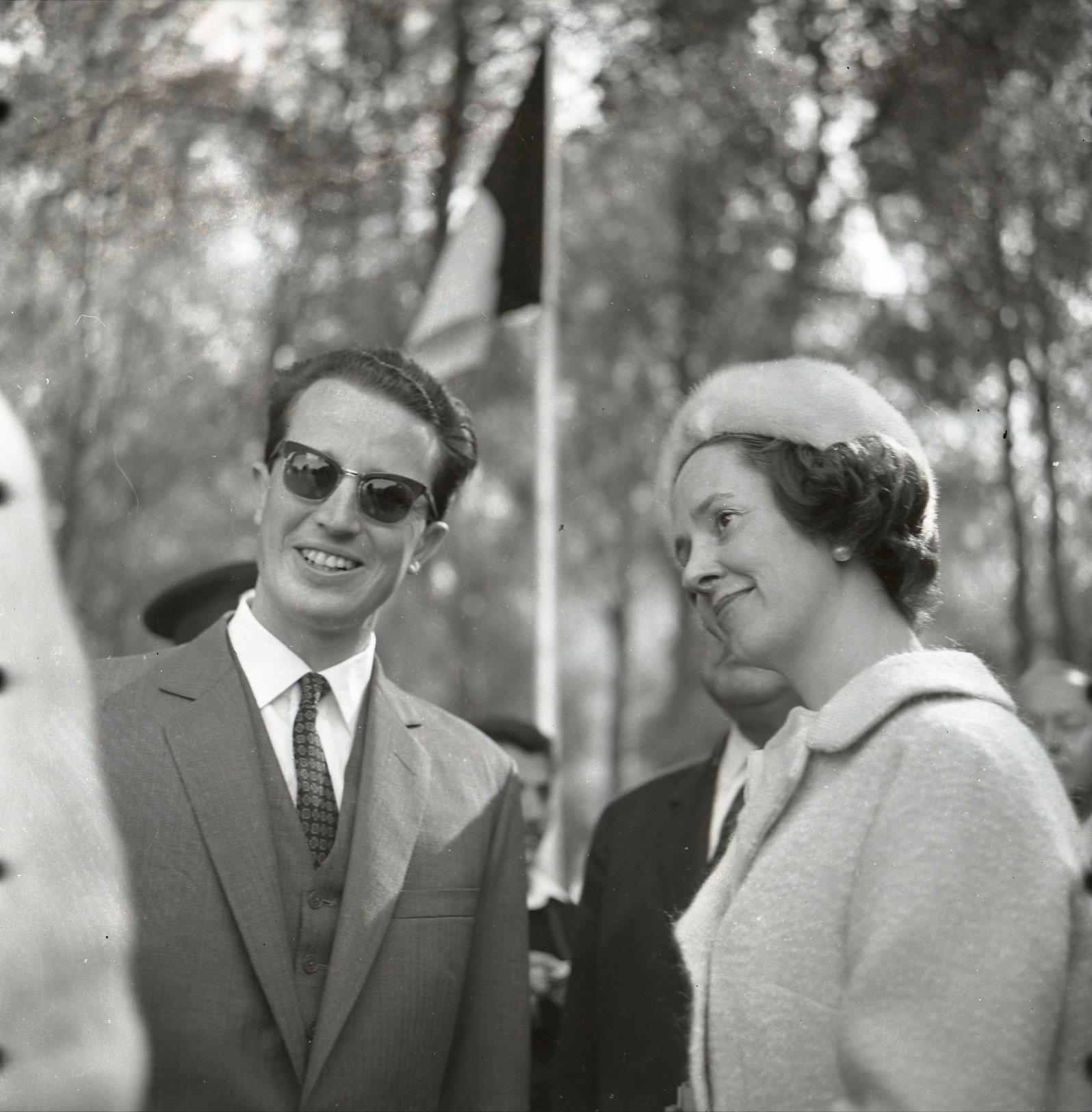
Baudouin and his wife, Fabiola de Mora y Aragón, during a 1964 visit to Israel

On 15 December 1960, Baudouin married Doña Fabiola de Mora y Aragón in Brussels. Fabiola was a Spanish noblewoman who was working as a nurse. The couple announced their engagement on 16 September 1960 at the Palace of Laeken.

Fabiola began undertaking official engagements immediately, accompanying the king to lay a wreath at the tomb of the unknown soldier in Brussels on 26 September 1960, and remained an active queen consort and queen dowager for the remainder of her life, involved in social causes particularly those related to mental health, children's issues and women's issues.

King Baudouin and Queen Fabiola had no children; all of the queen's five pregnancies ended in miscarriage.

=== Religion ===
Servant of God Baudouin, King of the Belgians
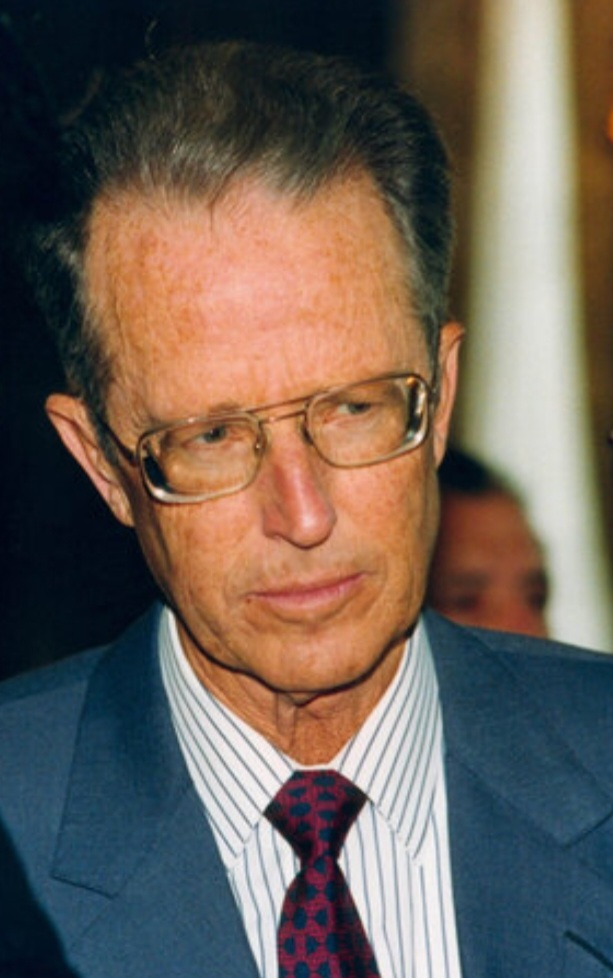
- Baudouin in 1992

Baudouin was a devout Catholic. Influenced by Cardinal Leo Suenens, Baudouin participated in the growing Catholic Charismatic Renewal and regularly went on pilgrimages to the Basilica of the Sacred Heart of Paray-le-Monial.

In 1990, when Parliament approved a law submitted by Roger Lallemand and Lucienne Herman-Michielsens that liberalised Belgium's abortion laws, he refused to give royal assent to the bill. This was unprecedented; although Baudouin was de jure Belgium's chief executive, royal assent has long been a formality (as in most constitutional and popular monarchies). However, due to his religious convictions—the Catholic Church opposes all forms of abortion—Baudouin asked the government to declare him temporarily unable to reign so that he could avoid signing the measure into law. The government under Wilfried Martens complied with his request on 4 April 1990. Under the Belgian Constitution, if the king is temporarily unable to reign, the government as a whole assumes the role of head of state. All government members signed the bill, and the next day (5 April 1990) the government called the bicameral legislature in a special session to approve a proposition that Baudouin was capable of reigning again.

He was the 1,176th Knight of the Order of the Golden Fleece in Spain, which was bestowed upon him in 1960, the 927th Knight of the Order of the Garter, bestowed upon him in 1963, and also the last living knight of the Papal Supreme Order of Christ.

== Legacy ==
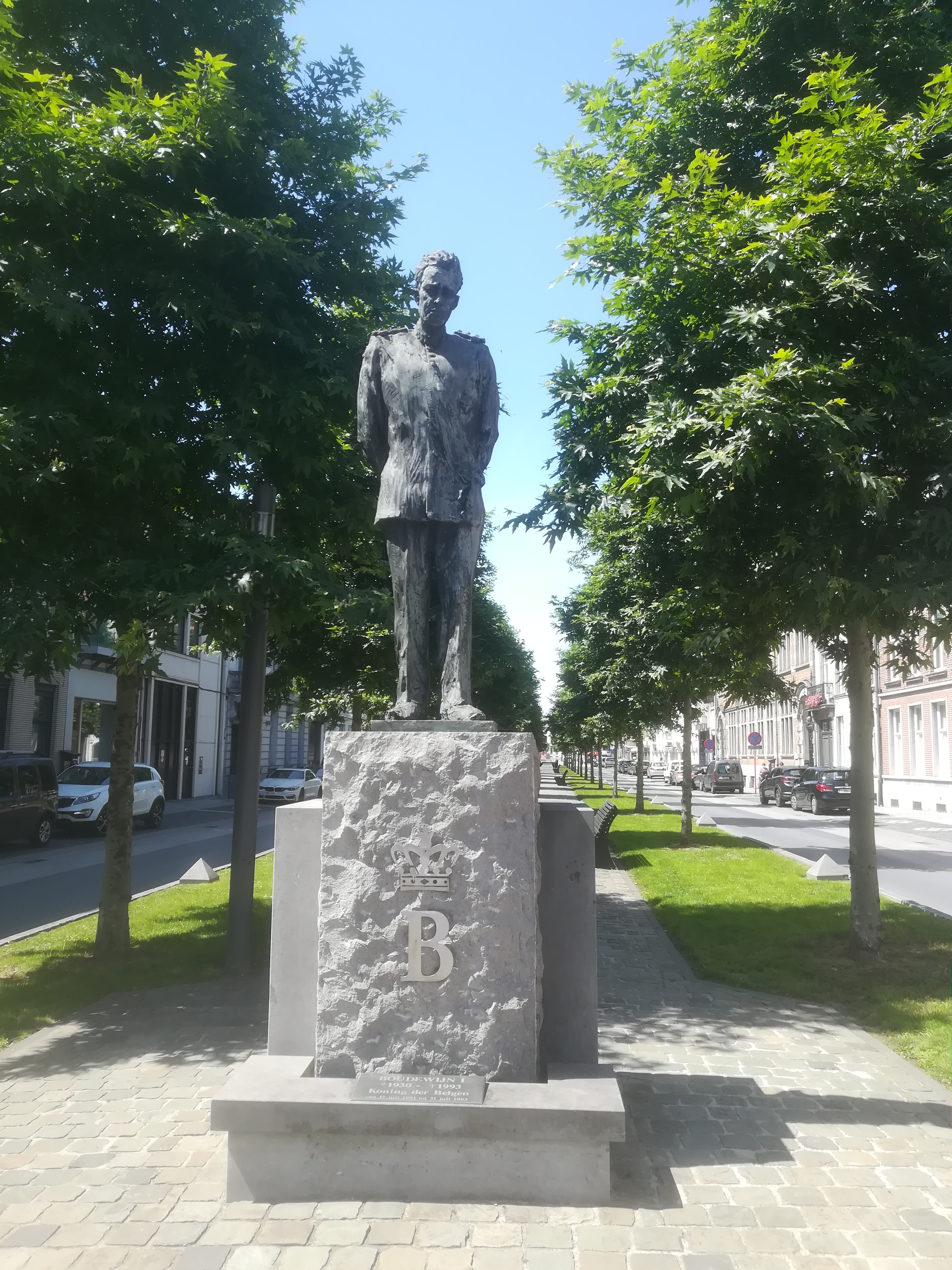
King Baudouin's statue in the city of Aalst

On 29 September 2024, Pope Francis announced during Mass as part of an official visit to Belgium, after visiting the Royal Crypt where Baudouin and Fabiola are buried the day before, his intention to start the procedure towards beatification of the late King. On 17 December 2024, the Vatican's Dicastery for the Causes of Saints officially launched the cause for the beatification and canonization of Baudouin.

== Honours ==
=== Belgian distinctions ===
Royal Monogram of King Baudouin I, King of the Belgians

- Grand Cordon on his 18th birthday, later Grand Master of the Order of Leopold
- Grand Master of the Order of the African Star
- Grand Master of the Royal Order of the Lion
- Grand Master of the Order of the Crown
- Grand Master of the Order of Leopold II

=== Other European distinctions ===
- Grand Star of the Honour for Services to the Republic of Austria
- Recipient of the Bavarian Order of Merit (West Germany)
- Grand Cross Special Class of the Order of Merit of the Federal Republic of Germany (West Germany)
- Knight of the Order of the Elephant (Denmark)
- Grand Cross of the Order of the White Rose of Finland
- Grand Cross of the Legion of Honour (France)
- Grand Cross of the Order of the Redeemer (Greece)
- Grand Cross of the Order of the Falcon (Iceland)
- Knight Grand Cross of the Order of Merit of the Italian Republic (Italy)
- Knight of the Order of the Golden Lion of Nassau (Luxembourg)
- Knight Grand Cross of the Order of Saint-Charles (Monaco)
- Knight Grand Cross of the Order of the Netherlands Lion (Netherlands)
- Grand Cross of the Order of St. Olav (Norway)
- Grand Collar of the Order of Prince Henry (Portugal)
- Grand Cross of the Military Order of Aviz (Portugal)
- Grand Cross of the Order of Santiago (Portugal)
- Grand Cross of the Military Order of Christ (Portugal)
- Sash of the Three Orders (Portugal)
- Member, 1st Class of the Order of the Star of the Socialist Republic of Romania
- Knight Grand Cross of the Order of San Marino
- Knight of the Order of the Golden Fleece (Spain)
- Knight of the Collar in the Order of Charles III (Spain)
- Knight of the Collar in the Order of Isabella the Catholic (Spain)
- Knight of the Order of the Seraphim (Sweden)
- Stranger Knight Companion of the Order of the Garter (UK)
- Great Star of the Order of the Yugoslavian Star (Yugoslavia)

=== Latin-American distinctions ===
- Grand Cross of the Order of the Liberator General San Martín (Argentina)
- Grand Cross of the Order of the Southern Cross (Brazil)
- Collar of the Order of Merit (Chile)
- Extraordinary Grand Cross of the Order of Boyacá (Colombia)
- Collar of the Order of the Aztec Eagle (Mexico)
- Grand Cross of the Order of Rubén Dario (Nicaragua)
- Grand Cross with Diamonds of the Order of the Sun of Peru
- Collar of the Order of the Liberator (Venezuela)

=== African distinctions ===
- Grand Cross of the Royal Order of Karyenda (Burundi)
- Grand Cross of the Order of Merit (Cameroon)
- Grand Cross of the Order of Central African Merit (Central African Republic)
- Grand Cross of the Order of the Green Crescent (Comoros)
- Grand Cordon of the National Order of the Leopard (Congo)
- Collar of the Order of the Seal of Solomon (Ethiopia)
- Grand Cross of the Order of the Equatorial Star (Gabon)
- Crand Cross of the National Order of the Ivory Coast
- Grand Cross of the Order of the Pioneers of Liberia
- Grand Cordon of the Order of the Throne (Morocco)
- Grand Commander of the Order of the Niger (Nigeria)
- Grand Cross of the National Order (Rwanda)
- Grand Cross of the Order of the Lion (Rwanda)
- Crand Cross of the National Order of the Lion (Senegal)
- Grand Cross of the Order of the Independence (Tunisia)
- Grand Cross of the Nationale Order (Upper-Volta)

=== Asian and Middle East distinctions ===
- Knight Grand Cross of the Royal Order of Cambodia
- Adipurna (1st Class) of the Star of the Republic of Indonesia
- Member 1st Class of the Order of Pahlavi (Iran)
- 25th Centennial Anniversary Medal (Iran)
- Collar of the Order of the Chrysanthemum (Japan)
- Recipient of the Grand Order of Mugunghwa (South-Korea)
- Grand Cordon of the Order of Merit (Lebanon)
- Collar of the Order of King Abdulaziz (Saudi Arabia)
- Knight of the Order of the Royal House of Chakri (Thailand)
- Knight Grand Cordon in the Order of Chula Chom Klao (Thailand)

=== Religious distinctions ===
The Catholic Baudouin received special honours associated with his faith.

- Knight Grand Cross of Honour and Devotion of the Sovereign Military Order of Malta
- Knight Grand Cross of the Order of the Holy Sepulchre (Holy See)
- Knight of the Supreme Order of Christ (Holy See)
- Knight of the Supreme Order of the Most Holy Annunciation (House of Savoy)

== See also ==
- King Leopold
- King Leopold's Ghost
- Crown Council of Belgium
- Royal Trust
- Herman Liebaers (Marshal of the Royal Household)
- André Molitor (private secretary)
- Jacques van Ypersele de Strihou (private secretary)
- Pierre-Yves Monette (advisor)
- King Baudouin Ice Shelf, Antarctica
- List of covers of Time magazine (1950s)

== Bibliography ==
- Wilsford, David, ed. (1995). Political Leaders of Contemporary Western Europe: A Biographical Dictionary. Greenwood Press. ISBN 978-0313286230.
- Conway, Martin (2012). The Sorrows of Belgium: Liberation and Political Reconstruction, 1944-1947. Oxford University Press. ISBN 978-0199694341.

=== Other languages ===
- A. Molitor, La fonction royale en Belgique, Brussels, 1979
- J.Stengers, De koningen der Belgen. Van Leopold I tot Albert II, Leuven, 1997.
- Kardinaal Suenens, Koning Boudewijn. Het getuigenis van een leven, Leuven, 1995.
- Kerstrede 18 December 1975, (ed.V.Neels), Wij Boudewijn, Koning der Belgen. Het politiek, sociaal en moreel testament van een nobel vorst, deel II, Gent, 1996.
- H. le Paige (dir.), Questions royales, Réflexions à propos de la mort d'un roi et sur la médiatisation de l'évènement, Brussels, 1994.

Baudouin of Belgium House of Saxe-Coburg and Gotha Cadet branch of the House of Wettin Born: 7 September 1930 Died: 31 July 1993
Royal titles
| Preceded by Leopold | Duke of Brabant; 1934–1951 | Vacant Title next held by Philippe |
Regnal titles
| Preceded by Leopold III | King of the Belgians; 1951–1993 | Succeeded by Albert II |
