= Shaun Wilson =

Australian artist (born 1972)

Shaun Wilson (born Melbourne, 1972) is an Australian artist, film maker, academic and curator working with themes of memory, place and scale through painting, miniatures and video art. He teaches digital media in the School of Design at RMIT University and exhibits inter/nationally at artist run spaces, university galleries, contemporary art centres and art/moving image museums.

== Biography ==
Shaun Wilson studied Fine Arts at RMIT University (BFA) between 1992–94 and then Monash University (BFA hons) in 1995. In 2002 he moved to Hobart to undertake a PhD in Philosophy and Media Arts (completed in 2005) at the University of Tasmania. His dissertation was titled The Memory Palace: Scale, Mnemonics and the Moving Image, which translated the Roman mnemonic texts Ad herrenium and De memoria through video installation. In 2005 he moved back to Melbourne to work in the School of Creative Media at RMIT University, Melbourne where he specialises in the relationship between memory and place in the moving image and further, the role and theorisation of Video art after 2000. He has also been a visiting professor at the Hochschule der Medien Stuttgart in 2006.

Since 1995, Wilson has held over 40 solo exhibitions/screenings and 200 group exhibitions/screenings at notable galleries including the National Centre of Contemporary Art Moscow (2008), Australian Centre for Contemporary Art (2006), Bilbao Arte (2006), Center for Contemporary Culture Barcelona (2006), Presidential Government of the Canary Islands (2006), Thailand New Media Arts Festival 05 (2005), Australian Centre for the Moving Image (2005), Institute of Modern Art Brisbane (2004), 24hrArt: NT Centre for Contemporary Art (2004), and the Centre on Contemporary Art Seattle (2018).

Wilson has delivered over 55 guest lectures on contemporary art and video art throughout Australia and Europe. Video Art production includes the Uber memoria Series I-XX1 (2006–07) composed of 210 video paintings filmed in Germany, England, Scotland, U.S. and Australia and the Gothic memoria series I-VII (2006–07) composed of 1000 video paintings filmed in Germany, UK, New Zealand and Australia. In 2014 he published his first vampire novel The Gothic Memorium through iTunes.

In 2025 Wilson completed his second PhD at Flinders University exploring slow cinema and metamodern affect[18].

== Work ==
=== Painting ===
Wilson trained and worked as a painter throughout the 1990s undertaking medium and large-scale oil on canvas and also acrylic on vinyl paintings which addressed two concurrent themes: the politicalization of the image in the mass media and the politicalization of narrative in the mass media. Influences are drawn from Caravaggio, Théodore Géricault, Francisco Goya, the political works of Andy Warhol, Robert Rauschenberg, and the butterfly paintings of Damien Hirst.

=== Miniatures ===
Wilson began three noted series of miniatures: Crash, Disasters of Small, and The Empire of Small. These detailed works began as a response to the role of the scaled object in contemporary art and later evolved to embrace themes of memory and place through issues and tensions between narrativity. Materials used are both commercially manufactured model kits and scratch-built cardboard/plastic objects attached onto various types of vintage hard-cover books.

=== Video Art ===
Wilson began using video from 1998 onwards as a temporal response and extension to painting. Works produced are categorised into series and sub-series. Since 2004 he has produced over 350 video artworks under the titles of Mnemoria series, The Memory Palace series, Filmic Memorials series I-IV and Uber Memoria I-VII/Proto. These particular works that Wilson himself describes as 'video paintings' explore the nature of memory and place through the moving image and its subsequent effect on autobiographical memory. In doing so, Wilson has deconstructed family home movies, vintage 8mm film, and found 9mm film and from late 2006 onwards he has incorporated these filmic images with High Definition Video (HDV) to convey tensions of fractured memory. Film theorist Leon Marvell describes Wilson's later work in Photofile as 'an ambitious and exquisitely realised exploration of the tension between artifact and memory'[2] while other reviews, such as Diane Clausen in Realtime, have described his video art as 'hypnotic'[3]. Recent work examined how cinema and video art co-exist to what artist and writer Brendan Lee describes in Artlink as 'best illustrat[ing] how cinema can affect another medium and comment on it'[9].

In 2007 he produced two feature length video artworks Uber nocturnus and Uber Memoria Protus that reconfigure Gothic Romanticism through the moving image and how this impacts on theories of false memory and its effect on places. As an extension to the Gothic memoria video art series, Wilson wrote and has embarked on feature length independent films titled Gothic memoria (2008), Epic memoria (2009) and Locus memoria (2010). Each film is based on the reinvention of paintings and etchings by Francisco Goya and Caspar David Friedrich and adapted with Napoleonic Gothic narratives. Recent work has also included Uber Memoria X composed of ten large scale video works 'where Wilson re-addresses Australian Colonial Painting through video art'[10]

In 2013 he released the feature-length movie "51 Paintings" filmed in Germany, England, and Australia between 2006 and 2013 which is the first of five planned films in the series The 51 Paintings Suite. The second film from the series "The Tailor of Autumn" was released in 2015[11]. The third film from the series "Indigo Rising" was released in 2018 where it premiered at the Dallas Medianale[12]. The forth film from the series "Winter Orbit" premiered in the Venice Production Bridge at the 77th Venice Film Festival[13] in 2020. Videoart influences include Bill Viola and Eija-Liisa Ahtila. Filmic influences include Alfred Hitchcock, Michel Gondry and Oliver Hirschbiegel.

=== Sound Art ===
Wilson began to publish sound art in limited editions from 2003 onwards as companion works to video art. These are the sonic versions of a winder inquiry into memory and place with many source references appropriated from family recordings and related material. Tracks are organised into series and sub series divided into four major categories and as limited edition single and double CDs. In 2004, the track 'statica' was released as a compilation double CD 'People Doing Strange Things With Electricity Too' (1994) available on Comfortstand Records (USA) and launched at the Centre on Contemporary Art Seattle in early 2005.

In 2007, his artwork 'Athenian Memory Palace' was included in Artwave Radio as part of the 1st Athens Biennial 2007.

Sonic influences include sound artists Philip Glass, Phil Edwards, Philip Brophy, and John Cage and musicians Moby and David Helfgott.

=== Cinematic Films ===
Wilson has directed, filmed, and wrote two feature films The Last Man in Vegas [14] and Black Garden [15] described by film critic John Noonan in Filmink as 'asking us to think about how far we'd push ourselves when all hope is lost.'[16]

== New Video art movement ==
In December 2006, Wilson founded a video art movement called Vothic ('Video' and 'Gothic') in response to his investigations of Gothic Romanticism from research undertaken for the curated exhibition Australian Gothic: video art now.

== Curatorial ventures ==
In 1996, Wilson and Melbourne-based painter Monica Adams opened Indigo Studios, a private art school located in the suburb of Burwood, Melbourne. The intent of the venture was to introduce contemporary art to audiences who were not traditionally art focused. A total of 45 exhibitions by art students and emerging artists were held in the gallery between 1997 and 2002 at the three different sites that Indigo occupied between these periods. The second site was a derelict shopfront and residence previously used as a backstreet brothel also located in Burwood. The third and final site was a derelict two-storey Federation shopfront and residency located in Camberwell renovated by Adams and Wilson into a two-gallery floor space with studios and accommodation upstairs. It was also haunted. In 2001, Wilson left Indigo and Adams later closed the business in 2003.

Wilson was a curator at the Jackman Gallery in St.Kilda, Melbourne in 2000. Independent projects have included over 20 exhibitions in Melbourne, Seattle, Berlin and Hobart. These include Australian Gothic (2007) at Project Space/Spare Room, Melbourne and the Directors Lounge, Berlin (2007) and Post-Cinema touring Australia and Germany in 2007 and 2008.

In 2022, Wilson was appointed curator of art with the G Biennale in Melbourne [17].

== Academic appointments and ventures ==
Wilson has upheld a strong commitment to academia with teaching appointments at Swinburne University (2000–01), Box Hill Institute (2000–01), University of Tasmania (2004) and RMIT University (2005-). In 2006, he founded the International Conference on Film and Memorialisation series which held its inaugural conference at the University of Applied Sciences, Schwaebsich Hall, Germany. In addition, related ventures complementing the series were also founded by Wilson including the Film and Memory Research Network and the Film and Memory Quarterly refereed academic e-journal. Wilson is a contributing editor for both.

Other appointments include the Co-ordinator of the Digital Cinema Research Group (RMIT University), Co-coordinator of the Narrative and the Image Research Group (RMIT University) and the Deputy Co-orinator of the Place Research Network (University of Tasmania).

In 2002 he was awarded the prestigious Australian Postgraduate Award to undertake doctoral study at the University of Tasmania.

In 2005, Wilson wrote a series of lectures delivered in his 'Media Cultures' course at RMIT University which explored the evolution of technology through modernity and postmodernity. These formed the basis of further articles exploring the histo-philosophical nature of digital media, especially MP3 and iPod culture, as evidenced in the forthcoming e-book Post-Pod available in 2008.

Archive projects include the ten-year Memory and Place Video Archive Project (2007-2017) started in December 2006 that aims to build a sizable archive of videoart from emerging and established artists who explore themes of memory and place, locational memory and locational identity through remembrance. This will be donated in 2017 to the Australian Centre for the Moving Image and Rhizome as a major filmic collection of international significance.

In 2006 he was the Program Coordinator of Higher Degrees by Research (MA and PhD) in the School of Creative Media at RMIT University, Melbourne (City) campus. Wilson is currently a Senior Lecturer in Digital Media in the School of Design at RMIT University. [18]

== See also ==
- List of Australian artists
- List of contemporary artists
- List of video artists
- Video art
- Gothic Romanticism

== Texts by Shaun Wilson ==
- The New New: video art in the 21st century
- Post-Cinema
- Slow Motion as a Condition of the Moving Image
- Alternative Characterisation Strategies in Contemporary Mainstream Zombie Cinema
