= Sonny Sanjay Vadgama =

British artist and filmmaker

Sonny Sanjay Vadgama (born London) is a British artist and filmmaker who has been exhibiting globally since 2009. He specialises in video sculpture and holograms and print work. He previously worked in research and production for BBC Choice/BBC 3.

== Education ==
Having completed his Foundation at the Byam Shaw in 2004 (Distinction) he graduated from Central St Martins (2006–2009) with a First and had the rare honour of seeing his entire degree show purchased within the first few hours. Sonny also studied at Kungl, Konsthögskolan, Stockholm in 2008 as part of an Erasmus exchange.

== Work ==
Since graduation his work has been exhibited in Stockholm, Barcelona, New York, Delhi, Galway, Sharjah, Paris and London.

An Eye For An Eye was nominated for a Digital Innovation award by Apple Mac and Sonny featured in the Catlin Art Guide as one of the 50 most promising B.A Art Graduates of 2009. Later that year his work was selected to be a part of FutureMap, an annual survey show exhibiting the best cutting edge talent from the graduating year at University of the Arts London.

In 2009 he also won "Exposure", a prestigious award which saw his work feature at The Parasol Unit during the Frieze Art Festival. This later led to his work being acquired and exhibited at the Devi Art Foundation in New Delhi

His 2009 work The Second Law is in the Zabludowicz Collection.

During 2010 he was named by Glass Magazine as one of its most exciting new artists and he was commissioned by the London Science Museum to create a new video sculpture work on Psychoanalysis that was displayed alongside artists such as Mona Hatoum and Grayson Perry. He was a 2010 finalist for the Catlin Art Prize.

In 2011 Vadgama was offered a platform to exhibit a large scale solo show at the Arts Gallery hosted by University of the Arts London. The show was sponsored by Impossible Project and composed of work ranging across video, photography and holography. In addition to this, 2011 also saw his work exhibited at the Fondation Cartier pour l'art contemporain, the Mensart Fair in Beirut and Stux Gallery, New York.

At the start of 2012 he was part of the Drop Everything Festival on the islands of Inis Oírr which resulted in his work being projected large scale on O'Brien's Castle.

As of 2012, Vadgama has been represented by Galerie Kornfeld in Berlin, Germany. This commenced with project that saw his work projected on some of Berlin's most prominent political and cultural monuments and later led to a multimedia solo show in September 2012.

In 2012 Berlin based art publication Monopol featured Vadgama in their "Watchlist" article and praised his first Berlin solo show.

Vadgama was the 2014-2015 Artist-in-residence at Girton College, University of Cambridge.

In 2016 he conducted an International Residency Programme in Moscow, supported by Arts Council England and The British Council in Russia. This resulted in him directing several short films with local dancers and production teams and he has since expanded his work in the city by directing TV commercials and co-producing documentaries.
