= Minnette Vári =

South African artist

- Born: Minnette Vári; Pretoria, South Africa, 1968
- Education: University of Pretoria
- Known for: Video art, Installation art, Painting, Drawing, Digital art
- Notable work: Alien, Oracle, REM, Chimera, Quake, Vigil, Rebus, Totem, The Revenant, Out of Time

Minnette Vári (born 1968) is a South African artist known primarily for her video installations. Born in Pretoria, Vári studied fine arts at the University of Pretoria where she obtained her master's degree. She lives and works in Johannesburg.

== Work ==
Vári has exhibited her work since the early nineties, participating in such group exhibitions as the Second Johannesburg Biennale (1997), the Venice Biennale (2001 and 2007), and the 10th Biennale of Havana (2009). Her solo exhibitions include a monographic solo exhibition at the Art Museum Lucerne, Switzerland (2004), Vigil at Elga Wimmer Gallery, New York (2007), Chimera at Basel Art Unlimited (2003) and most recently, Songs of Excavation at the Goodman Gallery in Johannesburg (2013). Since 1998 Vári has worked predominantly with digital media and large-scale video projections, often including performance elements by inserting her own body into reworked media and historical documentary footage. In addition, Vári regularly produces series of drawings and paintings that are thematically linked to her video projects. Her work has been associated with exhibitions and conferences exploring themes of identity and the body, transition, politics, mythology, trauma and history. Her work has been discussed in such publications as Art cities of the future, South African Art Now and 10 years 100 Artists, Art in a Democratic South Africa.

== See also ==
- Installation art
- Video installation
- Video Art
- Painting
- List of video artists
