= Pierre-Yves Monette =

Pierre-Yves Monette (born 1960) is the former Secretary-General of EurEau, a visiting professor at the College of Europe, registered Mediator and attorney at the Brussels Bar. He was formerly a councilor to King Baudouin and King Albert II of Belgium and Federal Ombudsman of Belgium. He has been candidate to the functions of European Ombudsman and of Human Right Commissioner of the Council of Europe.

Author of several essays, books and articles on European integration, law, mediation, good governance and the future of Belgium, he regularly participates to public debates and is commonly cited by the press on matters relating to Belgian royalty.

== Publications ==
- Entretiens avec Christian Laporte: Belgique où vas-tu ?, (French) Mardaga, 2007
- Métier de roi, (French) Alice, 2002 (trans. Beroep: koning der Belgen, (Dutch) Van Hallewyck, 2003)
- L'Europe, état d'urgence, (French) Desclée de Brouwer, 1997
- Les États-Unis d'Europe, (French) Nauwelaerts, 1993
