= Madeleine Altmann =

Contemporary video artist

- Born: May 11, 1963 (age 63); São Paulo, Brazil
- Education: Mary Immaculate Catholic Convent School; Bachelor of Arts degree from Hampshire College (1985); Master's degree from San Francisco Art Institute (1990); Master's degree in Professional Studies from New York University (1996)
- Awards: New York University Interactive Media Pioneer Award (1996) American Film Institute Visions of the US (1988)
- Website: www.madeleinealtmann.com

Madeleine Altmann is a contemporary video artist. She was born in Brazil and lives in the United States.

== Overview ==
Altmann has been active in visual arts for most of her life. Starting in photography, she moved on to television, interactive telecommunications and video art. She is best known for her seminal case against Viacom in protecting freedom of speech on TV and as an Internet pioneer. Along with her single channel installations, Altmann works with Andreas Uthoff to create the sculptural elements of the monitors on display. She now resides in Boston and Berlin.

== Career ==
After repeated sexual harassment in her commercial production jobs in Boston and NYC, Altmann opted to move to San Francisco and develop her own LIVE TV series called Madeleine's Variety TV (MVTV). George Kuchar acted as Altmann's mentor and contributed heavily to the show as did many students from the San Francisco Art Institute. As the show progressed Altmann became more and more obsessed with giving power to the viewers to control what they say. Fans would be able to call up and direct the cameras or the action. Any viewer could contribute videos to be aired and Altmann set up an equitable and democratic viewing platform in an era of broadcast station limited access and controlled content to the airwaves. From 1988 to 1990 San Francisco, Altmann produced 52 live MVTV shows through PEG-TV.

Altmann was granted a scholarship to attend The Interactive Telecommunications Program at TISCH School of the Arts at New York University. In 1994 she started work as an assistant to Nick West, professor at New York University, to join his program to develop interactive content for YORB. While at NYU she became Student President of TISCH. At times sophomoric, at others highly academic, Altmann's thesis "Mad Media" made waves at ITP and went on to become a web series on pseudo.com (then located just next door to ITP at 600 Broadway). Altmann describes her thesis as a highly interactive, provocative show with "…topics ranging from sex to search engines and God to gambling." Underneath it all is her strong belief that the real purpose of the show was to humanize technology. This work as well as her Death and Dying in America (Interactive CD ROM) as well as Babes4u landed Altmann 'The Interactive Pioneer Media Award' handed over by Red Burns at the School Of Interactive Telecommunications at New York University.

Altmann is credited as one of the early pioneers in online porn. As founder of the web's first women-owned-and-run porn site "Babes4U.com", Altmann has always seen sex on the Internet as both political and personal. Her work at with ESF and ITP led to her creation of Babes4u. Wanting her friends in the sex industry to be safer, she came up with the idea to make them virtual. NYU then gave her the tools and understanding of how to technically pull it off.

Babes4U became hugely popular and appeared in countless articles and newspapers across the globe. While still retaining some percentage of the business, Altmann handed over the reins for Babes4u to VideSecrets in 1998.

From 2007 to 2014 Altmann worked as Bedford TV's director for seven years. In that position she won numerous accolades for best station in the country as well as awards for the TV shows coming out of Bedford TV. While at Bedford TV Altmann produced many shows including Reading Aloud Beatrix Potter with Judith McCconnell; 21st Century Learning; Munch, Lessons of War, Oral History Of Bedford, Dealing With Death and many more.

Altmann has been making video art since her start at Hampshire College. Since 2014 Altmann has gone on to have numerous exhibits for her video art work around the world. After 1998 Altmann continued to pursue her interests in photography and video art. Her biggest influences are Bill Viola, Nam June Paik and George Kuchar.

== See also ==
- Video sculpture
