= Video sculpture =

Type of video installation

Electronic Superhighway: Continental U.S., Alaska, Hawaii by Nam June Paik is composed of over 300 television sets, neon tubing, and 50 DVD players, to form a map of the United States.

A video sculpture is a type of video installation that integrates video into an object, environment, site or performance. The nature of video sculpture is that it utilizes the material of video in an innovative way in space and time, different from the standard traditional narrative screening where the video has a beginning and end.

In one definition video sculpture involves one or more monitors or projections that spectators move among or stand in front of. Video sculptures formed of more than one screen or projection may broadcast a single program or may simultaneously broadcast different interconnected sequences on several channels. The screens used in the sculpture can be arranged in many different ways. For example, they can be suspended from a ceiling, aligned and stacked to make a video wall or even randomly stacked on top of each other. Video sculpture is a medium that offers performing artists a chance to have a more permanent artistic forum.

Video sculpture includes projection mapping on objects and environments. This has become more accessible and popular due to software advancements in the last five years.

== History ==
In the late 1950s and early 1960s, artists Wolf Vostell and Edward Kienholz began experimenting with televisions by using them in their happenings and assemblages respectively. In March 1963, Nam June Paik presented his first solo exhibition, Exposition of Music – Electronic Television, at Galerie Parnass in Wuppertal, Germany. The exhibition included 13 modified television sets, some of which allowed visitors to influence the displayed images through external controls. In May 1963 Wolf Vostell shows his installation 6 TV-Dé-coll/age at the Smolin Gallery in New York utilized six televisions, each with an anomaly. Shigeko Kubota was also an innovator in the use of video in sculptural form. Her Duchampiana: Nude Descending a Staircase was the first video sculpture acquired by the Museum of Modern Art. This work is a reference to Marcel Duchamp's Nude Descending a Staircase, No. 2 (1912) Video sculpturist are becoming influential among early 21st century artists. One of Paik's video sculptures in which the six windows of a 1936 Chrysler Airstream were replaced with video monitors sold for $75,000 in 2002.

Charlotte Moorman was a notable subject of video sculptures as a renowned topless cellist.

== Current developments ==
There are several developments in current video sculptures. The proliferation of powerful projectors and pixel-bending technology has enabled large-scale works often created for specific events and locations. Other artists like make use of multiple LCD screens or video walls and incorporate computer generated images. A different approach is used by artists like Madeleine Altmann, who creates sculptures with recycled cathode ray tube monitors.

== Notable video sculptors ==
- Michael Bielický
- Nicole Cohen
- Katja Loher
- Dennis Oppenheim
- Nam Jun Paik
- Pipilotti Rist
- Sonny Sanjay Vadgama

== See also ==
- Video painting
- Video wall
- Video installation
