= Domingo Sarrey =

- Born: 1948 (age 77–78); Santander, Spain
- Known for: Video art, visual art

Domingo Sarrey (Santander, Cantabria, Spain 1948) is a visual artist and video artist. His first video art piece was generated in the Computing Centre of Madrid Complutense University in 1968, while studying physics, although he had already carried out other cinematic creations in 8 mm. He was the first artist in creating and exhibiting a multi-vision with six projectors, "PANORAMA 78", in the MEAC (Spanish Contemporary Art Museum) in 1978. Other works such as "Villa María", "The Factory", "Words", "Radio Broadcast", "Reading", etc., were produced between 1972 and 1982, and were exhibited as the first manifestations of video-art as an artistic medium in some of the most renowned galleries, art centres, and institutions (Museo de Bellas Artes de Santander 1978, Galería Juana Mordó, 1979, Rompeolas, 1982, Espacio P (de Pedro Gardel) 1982, Casa de Velázquez,1982, Instituto Alemán 1983, Liceo Francés 1983, Fundación Juan March 1984, Alphaville "Circuitos de Video", 1984, Centro Nicolás Salmerón, 1986, Centro de Arte Reina Sofía etc.). In 2007, the cultural centre of Caja Cantabria in Santander presented Sarrey 1962-2007, a survey exhibition of his work shown from 12 July to 27 August 2007, accompanied by a catalogue with texts by Fernando Castro Flórez, Karin Ohlenschläger and Ignacio de Uriarte Rivera.
