= Rob Tyler =

Rob Tyler is a film and digital video artist from Portland, Oregon, USA who has created long form works of ambient video art.

From 1998 to 2005, Tyler's Color & Modulation was created by hand-painting roughly 15,000 frames of 16 mm film with acrylic paints, Magic Markers and fingernail polish.

In 2006, Rob Tyler was named finalist in Colorcalm's International Design Competition curated by graphic designer Peter Saville.
