= Ture Sjölander =

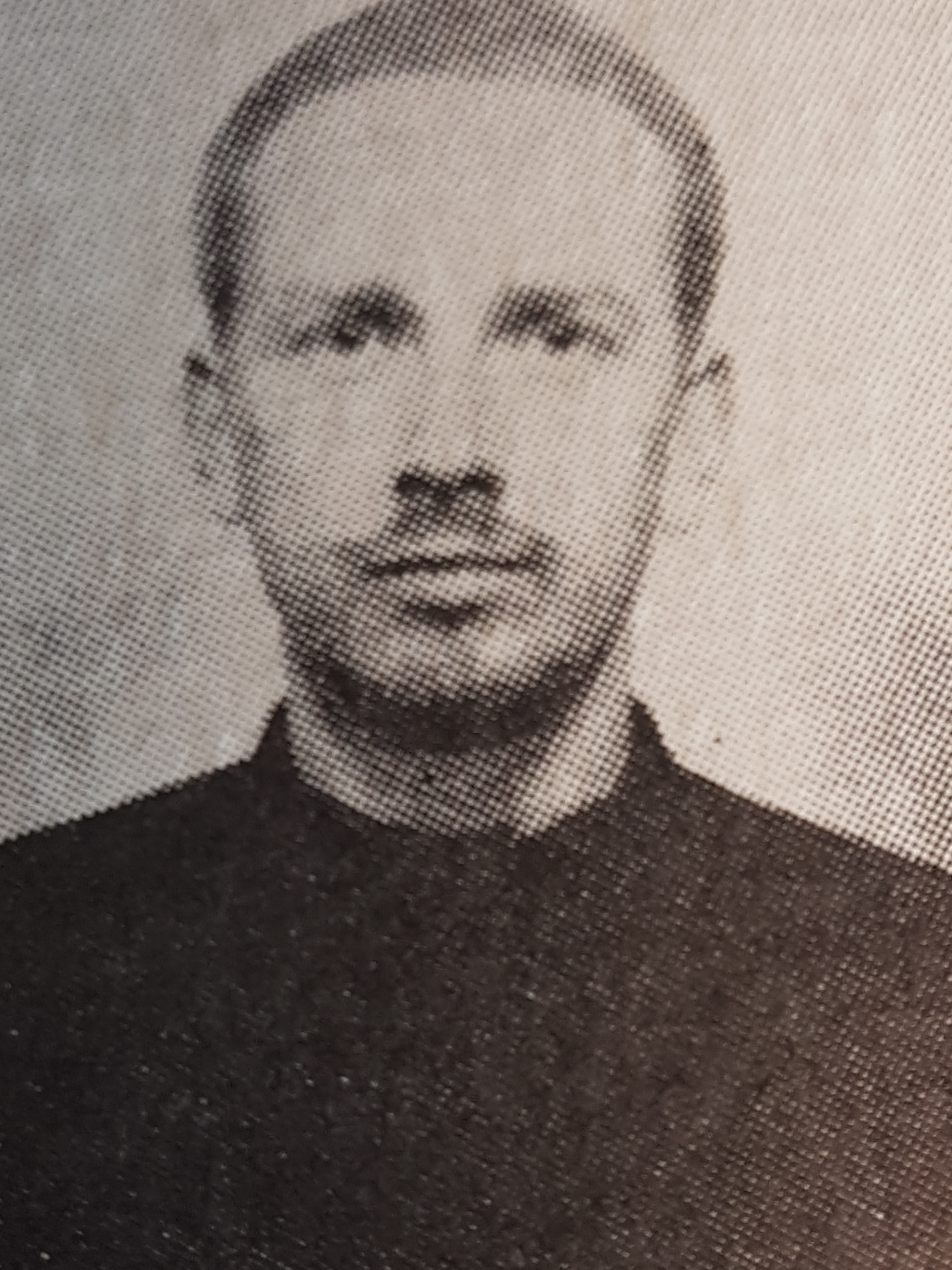
Ture Sjölander

Ture Sjölander (born 1937) is an early pioneer of computer animation. Beginning in 1964, his electronic images were being broadcast by Sveriges Television AB (SVT), the Swedish public broadcaster.

Productions from the SVT period include TIME (1965/66 Ture Sjolander and Bror Wikstrom), Monument (1968 with Lars Weck) and Space in the Brain (1969 Ture Sjolander, Bror Wikstrom, Sven Hoglund and Lasse Svanberg).
