= European Federation of National Associations of Water Services =

European Federation of National Associations of Water Services (EurEau) is the organisation that represents water service providers at the European level and offers expertise on the water sector to EU bodies and decision-makers, assists policy makers at the European level in the development of directives and other legislation affecting the water sector, and is also a network for its members to meet and exchange information and experience. Founded in 1975, the corporation has grown to represent drinking and wastewater service providers from 33 countries across Europe. These countries pertain to EU Member States, EFTA, and the EEA.

== History ==
EurEau’s origins can be traced back to 1972, when a small group of water supply professionals from the original six EEC member states provided an opinion on the 4th draft directive on water meters presented by the European Commission. Following this initial collaboration, the members decided to create an official association representing the EEC water supply companies to continue working on water legislation and meet the future requirements of the Commission, which had begun planning a directive on the quality of surface water required for the production of drinking water. EurEau was culminated and its constitution was signed in Brussels on March 21, 1975.

== Structure ==
EurEau’s governance structure consists of a General Assembly (GA), and Executive Committee (ExCom), three thematic committees, five thematic joint working groups (JWG), and its secretariat. The association is governed by the GA and the ExCom. The General Assembly is made up of one representative from each country. EurEau’s three thematic committees manage cases and draft positions on issues related to their area of expertise. They are made up of experts from member organisations. Its president is Pär Dalhielm.

- EU1: Drinking water: issues regarding untreated water, drinking water and associated distribution facilities.
- EU2: Wastewater: issues regarding wastewater and the aquatic environment, upstream work, chemicals, and recycling.
- EU3: Economic and legal affairs: issues related to law, finance and benchmarking.

== Secretariat ==
The EurEau secretariat is based in Brussels.

== Members ==
EurEau represents 38 national drinking and wastewater service providers across Europe.

Country	Member Organisation	Organisation Name	Organisation Name (English Translation)
Austria	OWAV	Österreichischer Wasser- und Abfallwirtschaftsverband	Austrian Water and Waste Management Association
Austria	OVGW	Österreichische Vereinigung für das Gas- und Wasserfach	Austrian Association for Gas and Water
Belgium	Belaqua	Belgische Federatie voor de Watersector / Fédération Belge du Secteur de l’Eau	Belgian Federation for the Water Sector
Bulgaria	UWSSORB	Съюз на ВиК Операторите в Република България	Union of Water Supply and sewerage Operators in the Republic of Bulgaria
Croatia	GVIK	Hrvatska grupacija vodovoda i kanalizacije	Croatian Water and Waste Water Association
Cyprus	CAWSB	Cyprus Association of Water and Sewerage Boards	
Czech Republic	SOVAK	Sdružení oboru vodovodů a kanalizací České republiky	Water Supply and Sewerage Association of the Czech Republic
Denmark	DANVA	Dansk Vand - og Spildevandsforening	Danish Water and Waste Water Association
Estonia	EVEL	Eesti Vee-ettevõtete Liit i.e.	Estonian Water Works Association
Finland	FIWA	Vesilaitosyhdistys - Vattenverksförening	Finnish Water Utilities Association
France	FP2E	Fédération Professionnelle des Entreprises de l’Eau	Professional Federation of Water Companies
Germany	BDEW	Bundesverband der Energie- und Wasserwirtschaft	German Association of Energy and Water Industries
Germany	DVGW	Deutscher Verein des Gas- und Wasserfaches e.V	German Technical and Scientific Association for Gas and Water
Greece	EDEYA	ΕΝΩΣΗ ΔΗΜΟΤΙΚΩΝ ΕΠΙΧΕΙΡΗΣΕΩΝ ΥΔΡΕΥΣΗΣ ΑΠΟΧΕΤΕΥΣΗΣ - Ε.Δ.Ε.Υ.Α.	Hellenic Union of Municipal Enterprises for Water Supply and Sewage
Hungary	MaViz	Magyar Víziközmű Szövetség	Hungarian Water Utility Association
Iceland	Samorka	The Icelandic federation of energy and utility companies	
Ireland	CCMA	The County and City Managers’ Association	
Ireland	Uisce Éireann	Irish Water	Irish Water
Italy	Utilitalia	Associazione delle imprese idriche energetiche e ambientali	Federation of Energy, Water and Environmental Services
Latvia	LWWWWA	Latvijas Udensapgades un Kanalizacijas Uznemumu Asociacija	Latvian Water and Wastewater Works Association
Lithuania	Vandens Jėga	Vandens Jėga	Lithuanian Water Association 'Water Power'
Luxemburg	ALUSEAU	Association Luxembourgeoise des Services d’Eau	Luxembourg Association of Water Services
Malta	WSC	Water Services Corporation	
Norway	Norsk Vann	Norsk Vann	Norwegian Water
Poland	IGWP	Izba Gospodarcza Wodociagi Polskie	Polish Waterworks Chamber of Commerce
Portugal	APDA	Associaçâo Portuguesa de Distribuiçâo e Drenagem de Aguas	Portuguese Association of Water and Wastewater Services
Romania	ARA	Asociatia Romana a Apei	Romanian Water Association
Serbia	PKS	Privredna Komora Srbije	Chamber of Commerce and Industry of Serbia
Slovakia	ASV	Asociácia Vodárenských Spoločností	Association of Water Companies
Slovenia	GZS-ZKG	Zbornica komunalnega gospodarstva Slovenije (ZKGS)	Chamber of Public Utilities of Slovenia
Spain	AEAS	Asociación Española de Abastecimientos de Agua y Saneamiento	Spanish Water and Wastewater Association
Sweden	Svenskt Vatten	Svent Vatten	The Swedish Water and Wastewater Association
Switzerland	SVGW	Société Suisse de l’Industrie du Gaz et des Eaux / Schweizerischer Verein des Gas- und Wasserfaches / Società Svizzera dell’Industria del Gas e delle Acque	Swiss Gas and Water Industry Association
Switzerland	VSA	Verband Schweizer Abwasser- und Gewässerschutzfachleute	The Swiss Waste Water Association
The Netherlands	UvW	Unie van Waterschappen	Dutch Water Authorities
The Netherlands	Vewin	Vereniging van waterbedrijven in Nederland	Association of Dutch Water Companies
Ukraine	Ukrvodokanal	Українська асоціація підприємств водопровідно-каналізаційного господарства «Укрводоканалекологія»	Ukrainian Association of Water Supply and Sewerage Enterprises
United Kingdom	Water UK	Water UK	
