= Jeanette Reinhardt =

Canadian video artist

Jeanette Reinhardt (born 1954) is a Canadian video artist.

== Career ==
Early in her career, Reinhardt was part of a group of Vancouver artists that included Paul Wong, Kenneth Fletcher, Deborah Fong, Carol Hackett, Marlene MacGregor, Annastacia McDonald and Charles Rea, collectively known as the Mainstreeters. In 1984, she and the Mainstreeters were part of a planned exhibition, Confused: Sexual Views, at the Vancouver Art Gallery, which the gallery cancelled following the National Gallery of Canada's Voice of Fire controversy.

In 1980, Reinhardt founded Video Out, a Vancouver-based non-profit distributor of LGBT video art and documentary works. In 1988 she was part of the exhibition Video: New Canadian Narrative at the Museum of Modern Art, New York.

== Collections ==
Reinhardt's work is in the collections of the National Gallery of Canada and the Museum of Modern Art, New York.
