= Roger Lallemand =

Belgian lawyer and politician

President of the Senate
- In office 10 March 1988 – 16 May 1988
- Preceded by: Edward Leemans
- Succeeded by: Lambert Kelchtermans

Personal details
- Born: 17 January 1932 Quevaucamps, Belgium
- Died: 20 October 2016 (aged 84) Saint-Gilles, Belgium
- Party: Socialist Party
- Education: Free University of Brussels, French

Roger Lallemand (French: [ʁɔʒe lalmɑ̃]; 17 January 1932 – 20 October 2016) was a Walloon lawyer, socialist politician, and president of the Belgian Senate.

== Education ==
He graduated as a licentiate in Romance philology and obtained a doctorate in law at the Universite Libre de Bruxelles (ULB).

During his studies, from 1952 to 1956, Roger Lallemand served as the President of the Free Inquiry Circle at the university.

== Career ==
Lallemand started his career in 1958 as a lawyer at the bar in Brussels. In 1971–1972, he chaired the Conference of Young Barristers in Brussels. From 1979 until 1985, he served as a co-opted senator and from 1985 until 1999 as a directly-elected senator, both for the Parti Socialiste (PS). He was President of the Belgian Senate from 10 March 1988 until 10 May 1988. He also served as a member of the Ixelles municipal council from 1983 until 2006.

His bill to legalize abortion under certain conditions, he co-submitted with Lucienne Herman-Michielsens, was approved by the Belgian parliament on 3 April 1990. This law modified Article 348.,350.,351 and 352 of the Belgian penal code (title VII, chapter I) and raised Article 353. As from 1999 he is honorary President of the senate and in 2002, he was appointed as a Minister of State. He is an honorary doctor of the University of Liège and the University of Mons. A Roger Lallemand Square was inaugurated in Quevaucamps in 2021.

== Honours ==
- 2012 : Officier du Mérite wallon (O.M.W.)
- 2002 : Minister of State, By Royal Decree of HM King Albert II.
- 1999 : Grand Cordon in the Order of Leopold.
- 1991 : Commander in the Legion of Honour.

== Sources ==
- Roger Lallemand, La Belgique, pays d’incertitude, Brussels, 1998.
- Roger Lallemand

Political offices
Preceded by Edward Leemans	President of the Senate; 1988	Succeeded by Lambert Kelchtermans
