= Lucienne Herman-Michielsens =

Belgian politician

Belgian Senate
- In office 11 May 1977 – 24 November 1991

Ghent municipal council
- In office 1977–1991

State Secretary
- In office 18 May 1980 – 7 October 1980
- Constituency: Flemish community

Personal details
- Born: Lucienne Adeline Jeanne Ida Michielsens; 13 March 1926 Ghent, Belgium
- Died: 22 January 1995 (aged 68) Ghent, Belgium
- Party: Party for Freedom and Progress
- Other political affiliations: Flemish Liberal Alliance
- Spouse: Jacques Herman
- Education: University of Ghent
- Occupation: Politician
- Committees: Status Committee of Women, General Assembly, United Nations (1973–1974)
- Affiliations: National Federation of Women PVV (President, 1970–1978); Federation of Flemish PVV Women (1978–1980)
- Founded: Federation of Flemish PVV Women
- Awards: Woman of the Year, 1989; Geuzenprijs en de tweejaarlijkse Prijs Vrijzinnig Humanisme, 1991

Lucienne Adeline Jeanne Ida Herman-Michielsens (13 March 1926 – 22 January 1995) was a Belgian liberal politician and a member of the Party for Freedom and Progress (PVV). She was married to Jacques Herman, a physician.

== Biography ==
Herman-Michielsens was the only child of Gaston Michielsens and Adeline Mielecam. Her father died when she was four years old. Herman-Michielsens started her career as a teacher, like her mother. Later, she obtained a doctorate in law at the University of Ghent and became a civil servant. She married Jacques Herman in 1951.

=== Political career ===
From 1965 to 1970, she was the president of the legal committee of the PVV Women (PVV-Vrouwen); in 1968, she became the director of the PVV Women of Ghent. She was president of the National Federation of Women PVV from 1970 until 1978, when that organization split due to language issues; she subsequently founded the Federation of Flemish PVV Women, becoming its first president. She remained a member of the Federation's Executive Board until her death. From 1977 until 1991, she was a member of the Ghent municipal council and senator for the PVV in the Belgian Senate. For a short period in 1980, Herman-Michielsens was State Secretary for the Flemish community.

On 3 April 1990, the Belgian parliament approved a bill, which Herman-Michielsens had submitted together with Roger Lallemand, to legalize abortion under certain conditions. (Note: The new law modified Articles 348, 350, 351, and 352 of the Belgian penal code (Title VII, Chapter I), and raised Article 353.)

In addition to supporting gender equality and abortion rights for women, Herman-Michielsens fought for the legal guarantees of religious pluralism. After proposals on pluralism failed in June 1970—recognizing Islam, but not liberalism—a law was passed on 23 January 1981 providing limited support.

Herman-Michielsens resigned in 1991, at the peak of her political career, after diabetes began to cause blindness and renal failure. She and her husband retired and moved to Knokke-Heist. Herman-Michielsens died in Ghent on 22 January 1995.
