= Nicole Cohen =

American installation artist (born 1970)

- Born: 1970 (age 55–56); United States
- Known for: Video art, installation art

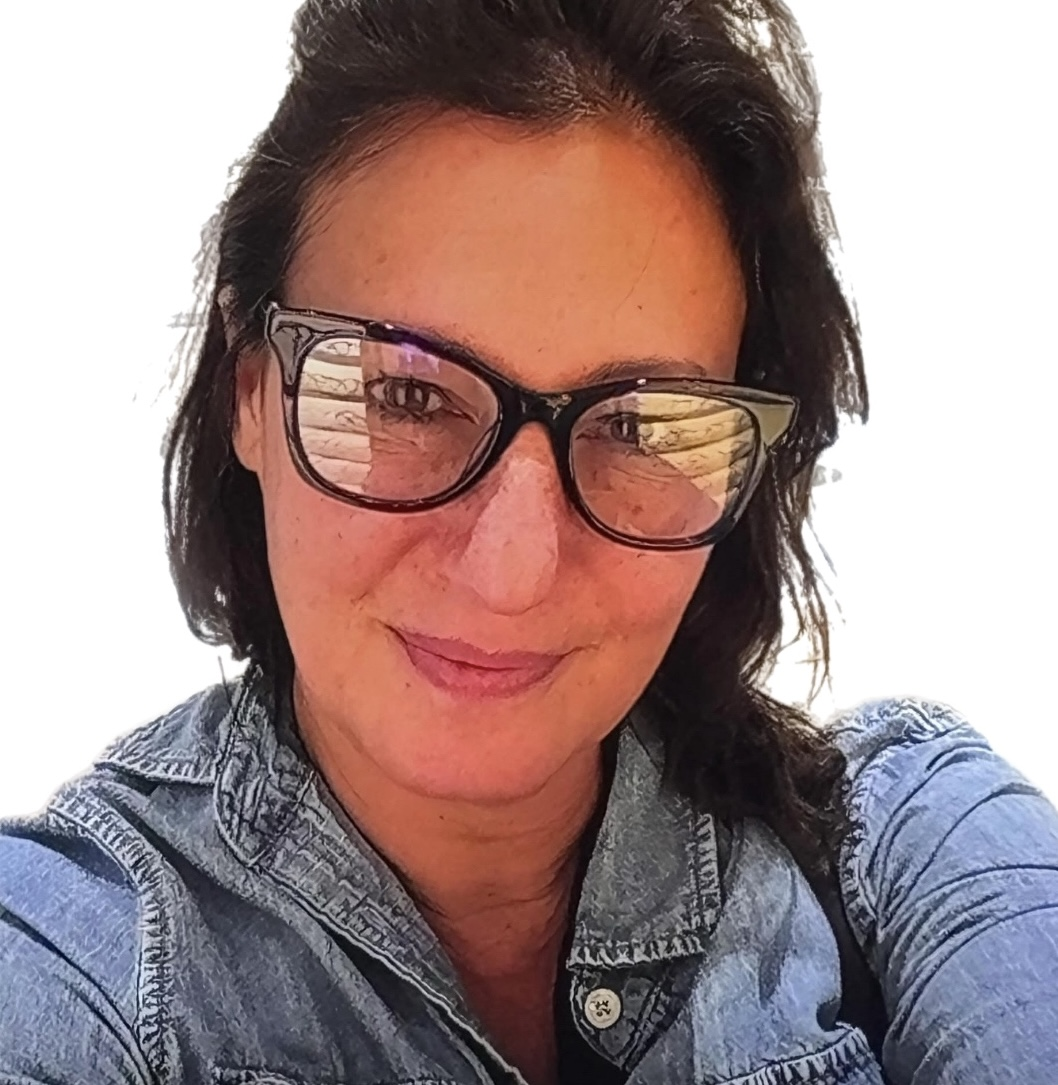
Nicole Cohen, American Artist

Nicole Cohen is an American installation artist who works with video and new media in order to explore issues of how interior design and architecture reveals aspects of portraiture and identity. Her video works often include interiors from vintage magazines, period rooms, that reveal an intervention with technology of surveillance use or video projection overlay. She uses photography and creates a video animation on top of the past image.

She uses video to transform and alter interior designed and architectural spaces. She explores ideas of perception and surveillance through her projects. Her influences stem from film/cinematic theory and the physical experience of immersion.

== Life and career ==
Born in Falmouth, Massachusetts in 1970, Cohen received a Bachelor of Arts degree from Hampshire College in Amherst, Massachusetts, and a Master of Fine Arts degree from the University of Southern California.

She has exhibited at the Williams College Museum of Art (Williamstown, Massachusetts), the Fabric Workshop and Museum (Philadelphia, Pennsylvania), the Los Angeles County Museum of Art, and the New York Public Library. She has shown internationally in Berlin, Germany; Bergen, Norway; Paris, France; Harajaku, Osaka, Kobe, and Tokyo, Japan; and Shanghai, China.

Cohen grew up in Washington, D.C. and Woods Hole, Cape Cod. She has lived in Los Angeles, California (7 years) Berlin, Germany (4 years) and currently lives in Teaneck, New Jersey. She has her art studio in Lower Manhattan.

=== Collective ===
Cohen is the founder and director of the Berlin Collective. Founded in 2009, it is an artist platform for international exchange to support the arts and American culture. Cohen focused on creating an artist/curator-run collective based in NYC and mostly Berlin, with the aim to provide opportunities, knowledge and intellectual growth to art professionals by strengthening international discourse.

=== Museum exhibitions ===
Super Vision, A Mid-Career Retrospective Exhibition, Zuccaire Gallery, Stony Brook University, 2024

- CICA 미술관, Czong Institute of Contemporary Art, Gimpo, South Korea
- Brooklyn Museum of Art, Brooklyn, New York (2012)
- Katzen Arts Center, American University Museum, Washington, D.C. (2011)
- The J. Paul Getty Museum, Los Angeles, CA (2007–09)
- Williams College Museum of Art, Williamstown, MA (2003)
- Los Angeles County Museum of Art, Los Angeles, CA (2001),
- Autostadt, Wolfsburg, Germany, Schloss Britz, Berlin, Germany
- Please Be Seated, Solo Exhibition at the J. Paul Getty Museum, Los Angeles, CA. (2007-09)

=== Galleries ===
- UNPAINTED, Digital Art, Munich, Germany
- Morgan Lehman Gallery, NYC
- Shoshana Wayne Gallery, LA
- La B.A.N.K. Galerie, Paris
- L'Space Gallery, Chelsea, NY (2026)
- IMPAKTO Gallery, Lima, Peru

=== Selected video works ===
- Pearl Drop, video
- Contemporary Art Books and the New York Public Library, 2024
- Grand Maison, video, 2009
- Please Be Seated, An Interactive Video Installation, 2007-2009
- How to Make Your Windows Beautiful, video installation, 2005
- Sunday Morning, video, 2003
- 40-Love, video installation, 2003
- Van Fantasies, video, 2001
