= Pierre Yves Clouin =

Pierre Yves Clouin is a video artist and filmmaker. He was born in Paris, where he lives and works. He studied architecture at the École Nationale Supérieure des Beaux-Arts in Paris. He has exhibited his paintings and photos in Paris.

== Awards & distinctions ==
2010

- Winner Institut français Hors les Murs program Residency Nouvelles Images, Montréal, Québec, Canada

2007

- Best of Independent Exposure, San Francisco, CA, USA: Le saut dans le vide (The Leap Into the Void)

2002

- Certificate of Merit, Chicago International Film Festival, Experimental Shorts Competition, Chicago, Illinois, USA: We Cannot Exhibit It
- Best Musical and Audience Choice Awards, Thaw, Festival of Film Video and Digital Media, Institute for Cinema and Culture, Iowa City, Iowa, USA: Strong Enough
- Highlight Selection, Cinematexas, Austin, Texas, USA: Cul en l'air (My Levitating Butt)

2000

- Audience Award, Best New Media, Festival du Cinema Francophone en Acadie, Moncton, New Brunswick, Canada: Broom Ballet

1999

- Special Mention, Videoarcheology, Paris, France / Sofia, Bulgaria: Head Egg
- Silver Spire Award, San Francisco International Film Festival, Golden Gate Award Competition, New Visions Video, San Francisco, USA: Workman

1998

- Third Prize Experimental, NAP Video Festival, New Arts Program, Lehigh Valley & Berks, Pennsylvania, USA: Front Room

1997

- Prix DRAC Auvergne (French Ministry of Culture), Vidéoformes, Clermont-Ferrand, France: C'est le veau qui bêle (The Bleating Calf)

1996

- Highlight Selection, Videonale 7, Bonn, Germany: C'est le veau qui bêle (The Bleating Calf)
