= Gladstone Gallery =

International art gallery in New York City

Coordinates: 40°44′56″N 74°0′16″W

Gladstone Gallery is an international art gallery founded by Barbara Gladstone in New York City in 1980. The gallery operates out of New York City, with branches in Los Angeles, California, Brussels, Belgium, and Seoul, South Korea. The gallery's primary exhibition space is on 24th Street in Manhattan with two other locations in Manhattan. This 24th Street space, known for its hangar-like dimensions, was designed by Selldorf Architects.

== History ==
In the 1980s Gladstone represented artist and activist Keith Haring. In 1991, Gladstone Gallery launched Matthew Barney's solo debut in New York City. Initially operating in Soho and on 57th Street, the gallery relocated to Chelsea in 1996. That same year, Gladstone partnered with Metro Pictures and Matthew Marks Gallery to acquire a spacious 29,000 square foot warehouse on West 24th Street. In the 1990s and 2000s, Gladstone gained visibility representing artists Shirin Neshat and Anish Kapoor. In 2020, Gavin Brown left his gallery to partner with Gladstone Gallery.

== Artist program ==
=== Artists ===
Gladstone Gallery today represents contemporary artists, including:

- Kai Althoff
- Ed Atkins (since 2020)
- Matthew Barney (since 1991)
- Thomas Bayrle (since 2020)
- Kerstin Brätsch (since 2020)
- Ian Cheng (since 2017)
- Carroll Dunham
- LaToya Ruby Frazier (since 2020)
- Cyprien Gaillard (since 2013)
- Thomas Hirschhorn
- Arthur Jafa (since 2020)
- Joan Jonas (since 2020)
- Anish Kapoor
- Alex Katz (since 2020)
- Mark Leckey (since 2020)
- Sarah Lucas
- Victor Man
- Jean-Luc Mylayne (since 1997)
- Jill Mulleady
- Wangechi Mutu
- Shirin Neshat
- Ugo Rondinone
- Philippe Parreno
- Elizabeth Peyton
- Rebecca Quaytman
- Rachel Rose (since 2020)
- David Salle (since 2023)
- Amy Sillman
- Frances Stark (since 2020)
- Vivian Suter (since 2018)
- Rirkrit Tiravanija (since 2020)
- Rosemarie Trockel
- Carrie Mae Weems (since 2023)
- Andro Wekua
- Michael Williams (since 2015)
- Anicka Yi

In addition to living artists, Gladstone Gallery also handles the estates of the following:

- Robert Bechtle
- Alighiero Boetti
- Keith Haring (since 2010)
- Huang Yong Ping
- Jannis Kounellis (since 2020)
- Robert Mapplethorpe (since 2017)
- Marisa Merz
- Elizabeth Murray (since 2020)
- William Pope.L (since 2026)
- Robert Rauschenberg (since 2023)
- Jack Smith (since)
- Lawrence Weiner (since 2024)

Gladstone Gallery has in the past represented the following:

- Allora & Calzadilla
- Ahmed Alsoudani (until 2017)
- Jenny Holzer
- Catherine Opie
- Lari Pittman (until 2019)
- Richard Prince (1987-2008)
