= Noisefields =

1974 video by Steina and Woody Vasulka

Still image from the 1974 video "Noisefields" by Steina and Woody Vasulka

"Noisefields" is a 1974 video by the collaborative duo Steina and Woody Vasulka, considered an important example of early formal and technical experimentation with analog video. It runs for twelve minutes and five seconds and materially visualizes the deflected energy of an electronic signal. The video switches between two sources throughout, which creates a flickering effect. The imagery is based on the deflection of electronic signals, and a colorizer is used to add color variation. In the video, a circular form materializes on the screen and presents a division between inner and outer. A pulsation between the two is sustained throughout.

== Signal ==
The Vasulkas were among the first video artists to experiment with electronic signal and the potential to delay its feedback or multiply waveforms to create new imagery. Their approach directly intervened with the directional movement of the signal. They wanted to transform line configurations by shifting the direction of the signal's constant horizontal and vertical flow. This interrupted the simultaneous feedback of image and sound signal and delivered a deviated image from the raster image, a new three-dimensional shape or form. "Noisefields" focuses on the deconstruction of the video signal, as it visualizes the signal's immaterial energy. The deconstruction of signal in the video produces an image wherein the diverse variation of form relies on the variability and modulation of frequency detected by the signal.

== Audio-visuality ==
The video camera, as opposed to the film camera, offered video artists the ability to record and play back sound and images simultaneously. Although the video camera records images, it is more closely tied to the process of "sound transmission, recording, and production". There is a reciprocal relationship between audio and video, as sound signals can be "translated into image signals", and visual content is generated by sound. The researcher and academic Yvonne Spielmann writes of video, "one can see what one hears and hear what one sees". Because of the close affinity between sound and image, many artists saw the video image as moving music. Emerging from a background in music, Steina wanted to apply the same principles of music composition to video-making. In her artist note "My Love Affair with Art: Video and Installation Work", she writes that she begins "with a melody" and then adds "harmonic lines". "Noisefields" explores the relationship between sound and image in video, as there exits a mutuality between the audio/video signal. Using video processor machines, the Vasulkas were able to further unite sound and sight as the energy content modulates the sound and image.

== Video processor ==
Like many other experimental video artists of the time, the Vasulkas used the Rutt/Etra Video Synthesizer to make "Noisefields". The machine was developed in 1973 by Louise Rutt, Steve Rutt, and Bill Etra, and allowed video artists to more wholly unite sound and image. It was of particular interest to artists who wanted to deconstruct and analyze video signal, in order to exert greater control over the modulation of electronic signals. The scan processor lifts "the brighter parts of the image...in their temporal progression, according to the voltage, causing the horizontal lines to deflect vertically and sculptural forms to be generated". Using the processor, the Vasulkas were able to create abstract images from the modulated video signal. In the production of this video, a circular form was recorded, and then extraneous electronic information was keyed into the circle. The video therefore visualizes and makes audible the movement and energy of the electronic signal. The result is a "noisy image–sound impression".

== Colorizer ==
Video, as opposed to film, uses an additive process for colorization. In "Noisefields", a colorizer was used to add variety and complexity to the saturation of video noise.

== Pulsation ==
The pulsation between an inner and outer field, the circle and rectangle, is mirrored by the rapid alternations between the two video sources, which maintains a rate of about sixty cycles per second. The switching occurs between two video sources, producing the two fields, background and circle. The two fields alternate between pure color and pure noise. The alternation creates a complex pulsation between circle and ground.

== Perception ==
As the video temporally unfolds, complex perceptual illusions are triggered through repetition, alteration, and flicker. The flickering video image, which references the perceptual explorations of Op Art and "flicker" film, produces the illusion of the video as a series of constructed frames. As the video image is constantly in motion, unlike a film image, a video "frame" never appears on the screen in its entirety, and the viewer cannot grasp the image as a whole. To receive the video images in full, the viewer must pause the video using VCR features, or the frames must be completed in a person's "perceptual-cognitive" system. As the Vasulkas were interested in exploring beyond the "theoretical 'frame' of video...to get rid of the supremacy of the human eye, the inherited modes of perception, and to reach an alternative", "Noisefields" explores the neuropsychological effects of the video image and promotes a perceptual model based on "interactive circuitry". The flicker is intensified to underscore perceptual stimuli, and the viewer is prompted to actively participate in perceiving the shifting field. The image therefore is partially a creation of the viewer's mental activity, and viewer and video become reciprocally engaged.
