= Video art =

Art form using video technology

An animated music video for the song Interstellar by Cosmic Dust Bin

Video art is an art form which relies on using video technology as a visual and audio medium. Video art emerged during the late 1960s as new consumer video technology such as video tape recorders became available outside corporate broadcasting. Video art can take many forms: recordings that are broadcast; installations viewed in galleries or museums; works either streamed online, or distributed as video tapes, or on DVDs; and performances which may incorporate one or more television sets, video monitors, and projections, displaying live or recorded images and sounds.

Video art is named for the original analog video tape, which was the most commonly used recording technology in much of the form's history into the 1990s. With the advent of digital recording equipment, many artists began to explore digital technology as a new way of expression. Video art does not necessarily rely on the conventions that define theatrical cinema. It may not use actors, may contain no dialogue, and may have no discernible narrative or plot. Video art also differs from cinema subcategories such as avant garde cinema, short films, and experimental film.

== Early history ==
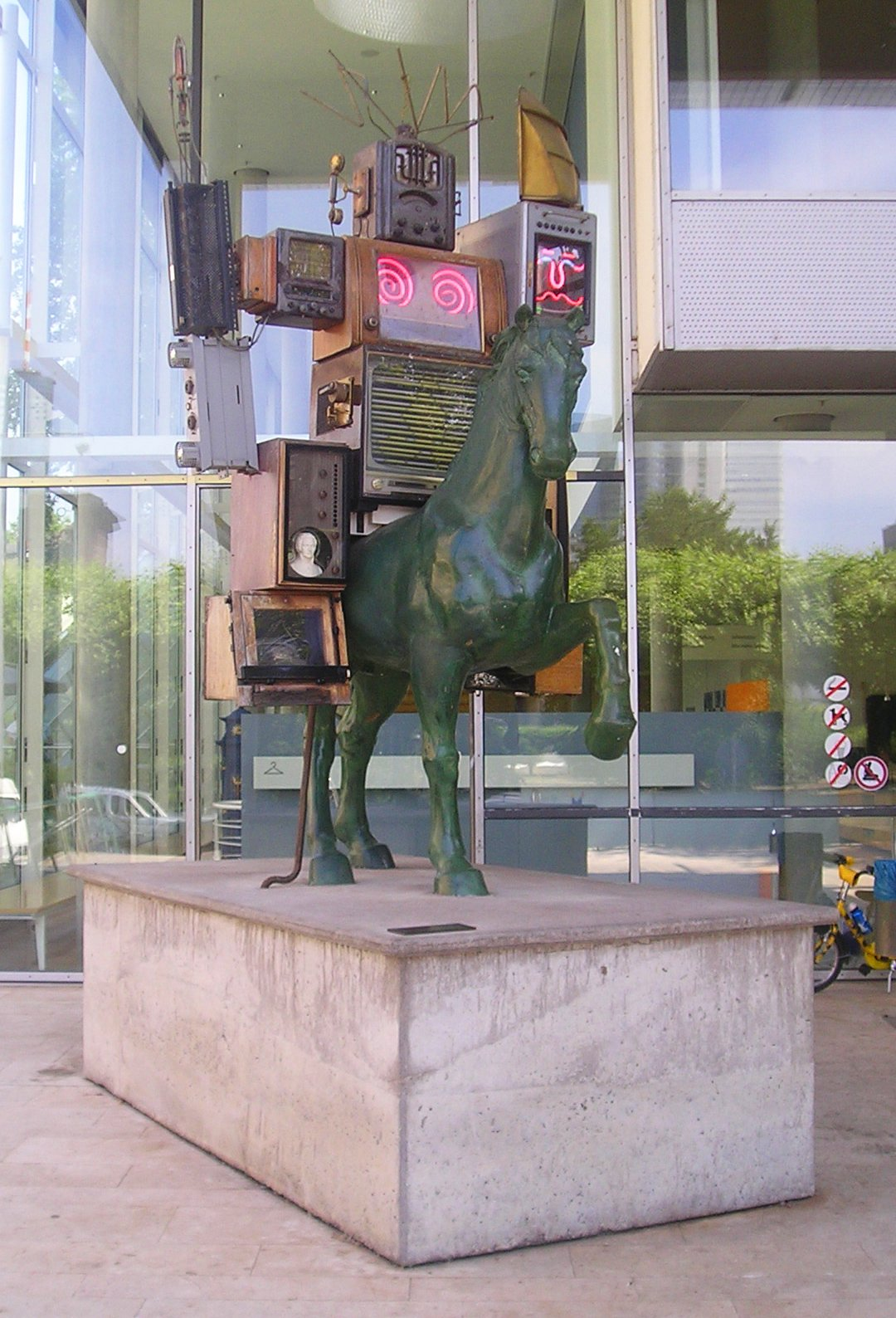
Pre-Bell-Man, Nam June Paik, 1989

Nam June Paik, a Korean-American artist who studied in Germany, is widely regarded as a pioneer in video art. In March 1963 Paik showed at the Galerie Parnass in Wuppertal the Exposition of Music – Electronic Television. In May 1963 Wolf Vostell showed the installation 6 TV Dé-coll/age at the Smolin Gallery in New York and created the video Sun in your head in Cologne. Originally Sun in your head was made on 16mm film and transferred 1967 to videotape.

Video art is often said to have begun when Paik used his new Sony Portapak to shoot footage of Pope Paul VI's procession through New York City in the autumn of 1965 Later that same day, across town in a Greenwich Village cafe, Paik played the tapes and video art was born.

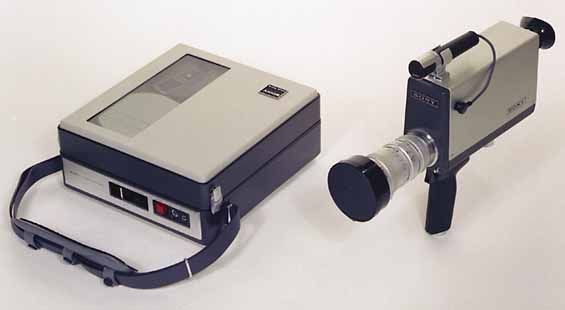
A Sony AV-3400 Portapak

Prior to the introduction of consumer video equipment, moving image production was only available non-commercially via 8mm film and 16mm film. After the Portapak's introduction and its subsequent update every few years, many artists began exploring the new technology.

Many of the early prominent video artists were those involved with concurrent movements in conceptual art, performance, and experimental film. These include Americans Vito Acconci, Valie Export, John Baldessari, Peter Campus, Doris Totten Chase, Maureen Connor, Norman Cowie, Dimitri Devyatkin, Frank Gillette, Dan Graham, Gary Hill, Joan Jonas, Bruce Nauman, Nam June Paik, Bill Viola, Shigeko Kubota, Martha Rosler, William Wegman, and many others. There were also those such as Steina and Woody Vasulka who were interested in the formal qualities of video and employed video synthesizers to create abstract works. Kate Craig, Vera Frenkel and Michael Snow were important to the development of video art in Canada.

== In the 1970s ==
Much video art in the medium's heyday experimented formally with the limitations of the video format. For example, American artist Peter Campus' Double Vision combined the video signals from two Sony Portapaks through an electronic mixer, resulting in a distorted and radically dissonant image. Another representative piece, Joan Jonas' Vertical Roll, involved recording previously recorded material of Jonas dancing while playing the videos back on a television, resulting in a layered and complex representation of mediation.

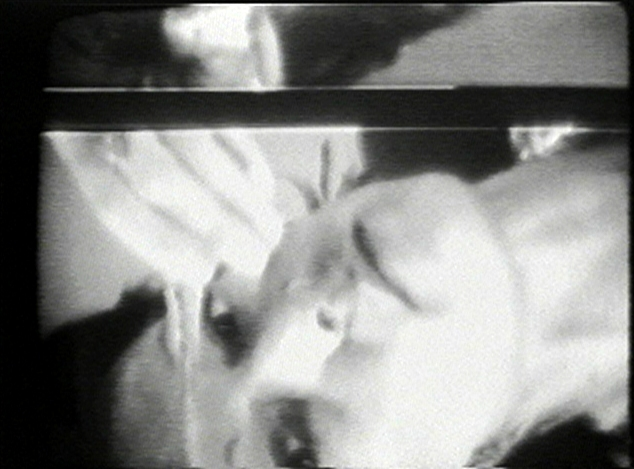
A still from Jonas' 1972 video

Much video art in the United States was produced in New York City, with The Kitchen, founded in 1972 by Steina and Woody Vasulka (and assisted by video director Dimitri Devyatkin and Shridhar Bapat), serving as a nexus for many young artists. An early multi-channel video artwork (using several monitors or screens) was Wipe Cycle by Ira Schneider and Frank Gillette. Wipe Cycle was first exhibited at the Howard Wise Gallery in New York in 1969 as part of an exhibition titled "TV as a Creative Medium". An installation of nine television screens, Wipe Cycle combined live images of gallery visitors, found footage from commercial television, and shots from pre-recorded tapes. The material was alternated from one monitor to the next in an elaborate choreography.

On the West coast, the San Jose State television studios in 1970, Willoughby Sharp began the "Videoviews" series of videotaped dialogues with artists. The "Videoviews" series consists of Sharps' dialogues with Bruce Nauman (1970), Joseph Beuys (1972), Vito Acconci (1973), Chris Burden (1973), Lowell Darling (1974), and Dennis Oppenheim (1974). Also in 1970, Sharp curated "Body Works", an exhibition of video works by Vito Acconci, Terry Fox, Richard Serra, Keith Sonnier, Dennis Oppenheim and William Wegman which was presented at Tom Marioni's Museum of Conceptual Art, San Francisco, California.

In Europe, Valie Export's groundbreaking video piece, "Facing a Family" (1971) was one of the first instances of television intervention and broadcasting video art. The video, originally broadcast on the Austrian television program "Kontakte" February 2, 1971,[11] shows a bourgeois Austrian family watching TV while eating dinner, creating a mirroring effect for many members of the audience who were doing the same thing. Export believed the television could complicate the relationship between subject, spectator, and television. In the United Kingdom David Hall's "TV Interruptions" (1971) were transmitted intentionally unannounced and uncredited on Scottish TV, the first artist interventions on British television.

== 1980s–1990s ==
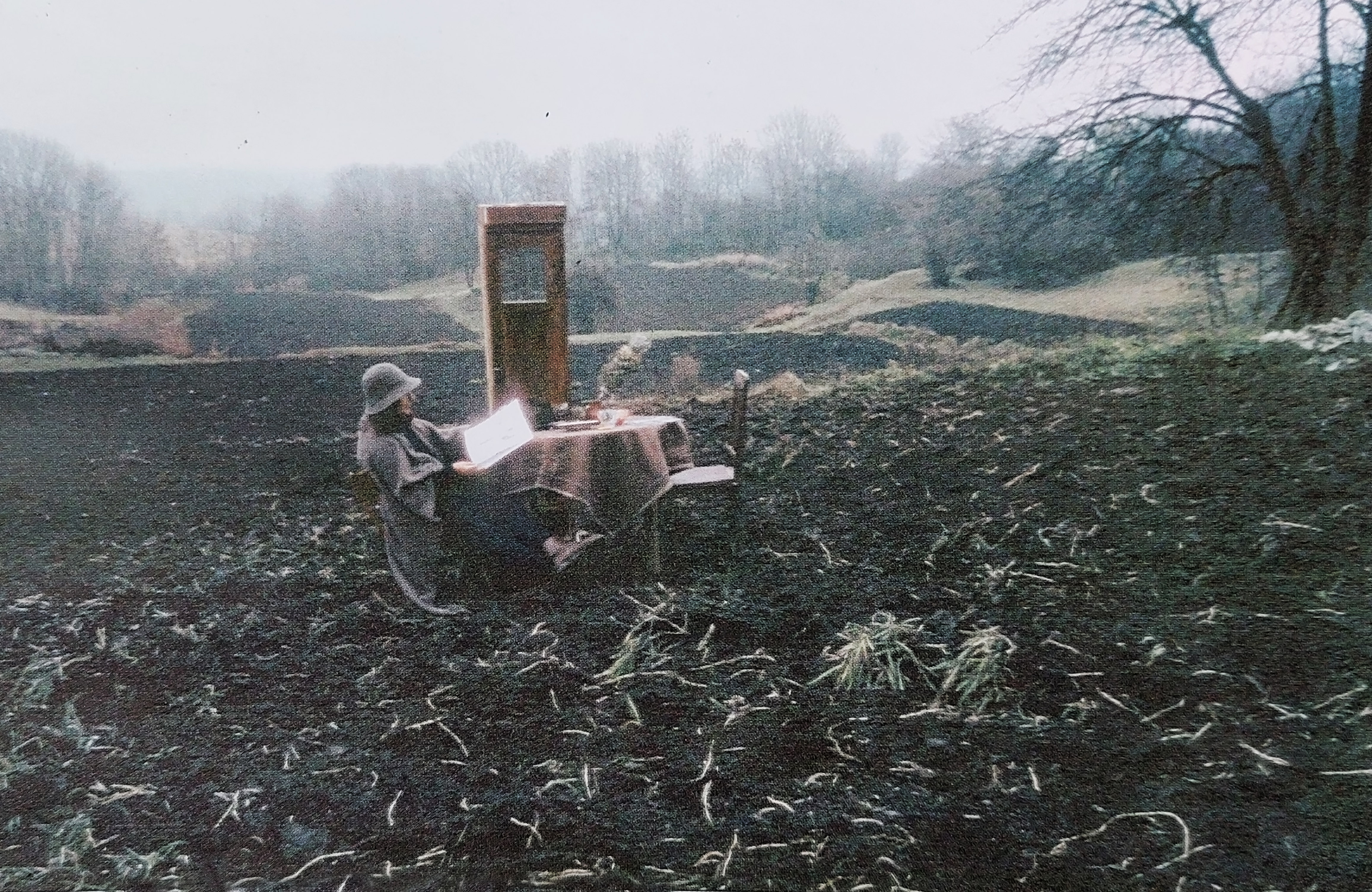
From video by Ukrainian Glib Viches, Reconstructions, 1995

As the prices of editing software decreased, the access the general public had to utilize these technologies increased. Video editing software became so readily available that it changed the way artists worked with the medium. Simulteanously, with the arrival of independent televisions in Europe and the emergence of video clips, artists also used the potential of special effects, high quality images and sophisticated editing (Gary Hill, Bill Viola). Festivals dedicated to video art such as the World Wide Video festival in The Hague, the Biennale de l'Image in Geneva or Ars Electronica in Linz developed and underlined the importance of creation in this field.

From the beginning of the 90's, contemporary art exhibitions integrate artists' videos among other works and installations. This is the case of the Venice Biennale (Aperto 93) and of NowHere at the Louisiana Museum, but also of art galleries where a new generation of artists for whom the arrival of lighter equipment such as Handycams favored a more direct expression. Artists such as Pipilotti Rist, Tony Oursler, Carsten Höller, Cheryl Donegan, Nelson Sullivan were able, as others in the 1960s, to leave their studios easily to film by hand without sophistication, sometimes mixing found images with their own (Douglas Gordon, Pierre Bismuth, Sylvie Fleury, Johan Grimonprez, Claude Closky) and using a present but simple post-production. The presentation of the works was also simplified with the arrival of monitors in the exhibition rooms and distribution in VHS. The arrival of this younger generation announced the feminist and gender issues to come, but also the increasingly hybrid use of different media (transferred super 8 films, 16mm, digital editing, TV show excerpts, sounds from different sources, etc).

At the same time, museums and institutions more specialized in video art were integrating digital technology, such as the ZKM in Karlsruhe, directed by Peter Weibel, with numerous thematic exhibitions, or the Centre pour l'Image Contemporaine with its biennial Version (1994-2004) directed by Simon Lamunière.

With the arrival of digital technology and the Internet, some museums have federated their databases such as New Media Art produced by the Centre Georges Pompidou in Paris, the Museum Ludwig in Cologne and the Centre pour l'Image Contemporaine (Center for Contemporary Images) in Geneva.

By the end of the century, institutions and artists worked on the expanding spectrum of the media, 3d imagery, interactivity, cd-roms, Internet, digital post production etc. Different themes emerged such as interactivity and nonlinearity. Some artists combined physical and digital techniques, such as Jeffrey Shaw's "Legible City" (1988–91). Others by using Low-Tech interactivity such as Claude Closky's online "+1" or "Do you want Love or Lust" in 1996 coproduced by the Dia Art Foundation. But these steps start to move away from the so called video art towards the New media art and Internet art.

== 2000s–2010s ==
As the available amount of footage and the editing techniques evolved, some artists have also produced complex narrative videos without using any of their own footage: Marco Brambilla's Civilization (2008) is a collage, or a "video mural" that portrays heaven and hell. Johan Grimonprez's Dial H-I-S-T-O-R-Y is a 68 minute long interpretation of the cold war and the role of terrorists, made almost exclusively with original television and film excerpts on hijacking.

More generally, during the first decade, one of the most significant steps in the video art domain, was achieved with its strong presence in contemporary art exhibitions at the international level. During this period, it was common to see artist videos in group shows, on monitors or as projections. More than a third of the works presented at Art Unlimited (the section of Art Basel dedicated to large-scale works) were video installations between 2000 and 2015. The same is true for most biennials. A new generation of artists such as Pipilotti Rist, Francis Alys, Kim Sooja, Apichatpong Weerasethakul, Omer Fast, David Claerbout, Sarah Morris, Matthew Barney, were presented alongside the previous generations (Roman Signer, Bruce Nauman, Bill Viola, Joan Jonas, John Baldessari).

Some artists have also widened their audience by making movies (Apichatpong Weerasethakul, who won the 2010 Cannes Film Festival "Palm d'or") or by curating large public events (Pipilotti Rist's Swiss National Expo02).

In 2003, Kalup Linzy created Conversations Wit De Churen II: All My Churen, a soap opera satire that has been credited as creating the video and performance sub-genre Although Linzy's work is genre defying his work has been a major contribution to the medium. Ryan Trecartin, an experimental young video-artist, uses color, editing techniques and bizarre acting to portray what The New Yorker calls "a cultural watershed".

== Performance art and video art ==
Video art as a medium can also be combined with other forms of artistic expression such as Performance art. This combination can also be referred to as "media and performance art" when artists "break the mold of video and film and broaden the boundaries of art". With increased ability for artists to obtain video cameras, performance art started being documented and shared across large amounts of audiences. Artists such as Marina Abramovic and Ulay experimented with video taping their performances in the 1970s and the 1980s. In a piece titled "Rest energy" (1980) both Ulay and Marina suspended their weight so that they pulled back a bow and arrow aimed at her heart, Ulay held the arrow, and Marina the bow. The piece was 4:10 which Marina described as being "a performance about complete and total trust".

Other artists who combined Video art with Performance art used the camera as the audience. Kate Gilmore experimented with the positioning of the camera. In her video "Anything" (2006) she films her performance piece as she is constantly trying the reach the camera which is staring down at her. As the 13-minute video goes on, she continues to tie together pieces of furniture while constantly attempting to reach the camera. Gilmore added an element of struggle to her art which is sometimes self-imposed, in her video "My love is an anchor" (2004) she lets her foot dry in cement before attempting to break free on camera. Gilmore has said to have mimicked expression styles from the 1960s and 1970s with inspirations like Marina Abramovic as she adds extremism and struggle to her work.

Some artists experimented with space when combining Video art and Performance art. Ragnar Kjartannson, an Icelandic artist, filmed an entire music video with 9 different artists, including himself, being filmed in different rooms. All the artists could hear each other through a pair of headphones so that they could play the song together, the piece was titled "The visitors" (2012).

Some artists, such as Jaki Irvine and Victoria Fu have experimented with combining 16 mm film, 8 mm film and video to make use of the potential discontinuity between moving image, musical score and narrator to undermine any sense of linear narrative.

== As an academic discipline ==
Since 2000, video arts programs have begun to emerge among colleges and universities as a standalone discipline typically situated in relation to film and older broadcast curricula. Current models found in universities like Northeastern and Syracuse show video arts offering baseline competencies in lighting, editing and camera operation. While these fundamentals can feed into and support existing film or TV production areas, recent growth of entertainment media through CGI and other special effects situate skills like animation, motion graphics and computer aided design as upper level courses in this emerging area.

== Notable video art organizations ==
- Ars Electronica Center (AEC), Linz, Austria
- Edith-Russ-Haus for Media Art, Oldenburg, Germany
- Electronic Arts Intermix, New York, NY
- Experimental Television Center, New York
- Goetz Collection, Munich, Germany
- Imai – inter media art institute, Düsseldorf
- Impakt Festival, Utrecht
- Julia Stoschek Collection, Düsseldorf, Germany
- Kunstmuseum Bonn, large video art collection
- LA Freewaves is an experimental media art festival with video art, shorts and animation; exhibitions are in Los Angeles and online.
- Lumen Eclipse – Harvard Square, MA
- LUX, London, UK
- London Video Arts, London, UK
- Neuer Berliner Kunstverein with its "Video-Forum" established in 1971 – Berlin, Germany
- Raindance Foundation, New York
- Souvenirs from Earth, Art TV Station on European Cable Networks (Paris, Cologne)
- Vtape, Toronto, Canada
- Videoart at Midnight, an artists' cinema project, Berlin, Germany
- Video Data Bank, Chicago, IL.
- VIVO Media Arts Centre, Vancouver, Canada
- ZKM Center for Art and Media Karlsruhe, Germany
- Videobrasil, Associação Cultural Videobrasil, São Paulo, Brazil
- Ibrida Festival, Vertov Project, Forlì, Italy

== See also ==
- Artmedia
- Experimental film
- INFERMENTAL
- Interactive film
- List of video artists
- Music video
- Music visualization
- New media art
- Optical feedback
- Real-time computer graphics
- Scratch video
- Single-channel video
- Sound art
- Video jockey
- Video poetry
- Video sculpture
- Video installation
- Video synthesizer
- Visual music
- VJing
