= Barbara Gladstone =

American art dealer and film producer (1935–2024)

- Born: Barbara Levitt; May 21, 1935; Philadelphia, Pennsylvania, U.S.
- Died: June 16, 2024 (aged 89); Paris, France
- Occupations: Gallery owner; art dealer; film producer
- Spouses: Leonard Gladstone (divorced); Elliot B. Regen (divorced)
- Children: 3

Barbara Gladstone (née Levitt; May 21, 1935 – June 16, 2024) was an American art dealer and film producer. She was owner of Gladstone Gallery, a contemporary art gallery with locations in New York and Brussels.

== Background ==
Barbara Levitt was born in Philadelphia on May 21, 1935. She began collecting in the 1970s, alongside a job teaching art history at Hofstra University.

She was married twice, to Elliot Regen and Leonard Gladstone; both marriages ended in divorce. She had two sons, David and Richard Regen; her third son, Stuart Regen, died in 1998 at USC Norris Comprehensive Cancer Center of non-Hodgkin's lymphoma.

== Career ==
=== Gladstone Gallery ===
In 1980, Gladstone gave up her job at Hofstra to open an art gallery in Manhattan, where she began showing Jenny Holzer.

From 1989 to 1992, Gladstone Gallery collaborated with Christian Stein, an Italian art gallerist, on SteinGladstone. Located in a renovated firehouse at 99 Wooster Street in Soho, the gallery concentrated exclusively on rarely seen installation works by both Italian and American artists.

Gladstone Gallery staged Matthew Barney's first New York solo show in 1991 and has since introduced many international artists to an American audience. Before moving to Chelsea in 1996, the gallery was located in Soho and on 57th Street in New York City. In 1996, the gallery teamed up with two other galleries – Metro Pictures and Matthew Marks Gallery – to acquire and divide up a 29,000 sq ft (2,700 m^{2}) warehouse at 515 West 24th Street. In addition, Gladstone Gallery operates spaces at 530 West 21st Street and at 12 Rue du Grand Cerf in Brussels.

The gallery is also a prominent participant in many major art fairs.

In 2002, Gladstone brought Curt Marcus on as partner for several years. In 2020, Gladstone Gallery merged with Gavin Brown's Enterprise and made Gavin Brown a partner.

Beginning in 2018, Gladstone served on the board of the non-profit Artists Space.

=== Film production ===
Gladstone produced many of Matthew Barney's movies, including four films from The Cremaster Cycle and the 2006 movie Drawing Restraint 9, a collaboration between Barney and Björk. Gladstone appears in Drawing Restraint 13, a later film by Barney. Gladstone also produced Shirin Neshat's film Women Without Men.

=== Stuart Regen Visionaries Fund ===
In 2008, Gladstone initiated the formation of the Stuart Regen Visionaries Fund at the New Museum, established in honor of her late son the art dealer Stuart Regen. The gift is meant to support a series of public lectures and presentations by cultural visionaries and debuted in 2009 with choreographer Bill T. Jones. It has featured prominent international thinkers in the fields of art, architecture, design and contemporary culture. Past speakers have included Jimmy Wales (2010), Alice Waters (2011), Maya Lin (2013), Hilton Als (2015), and Fran Lebowitz (2016, in conversation with Martin Scorsese).

== Personal life and death ==
From 2005 until 2012, Gladstone maintained a residence at 165 Charles Street, a residential tower designed by Richard Meier. She later moved to a 19th-century townhouse at 344 West 22nd Street in Chelsea, which sold for $13.1 million after her death.

Gladstone died from an apparent stroke on June 16, 2024, at a hospital in Paris; she had traveled to the city on a work trip. She was 89.
