= Centre pour l'Image Contemporaine =

The Centre pour l'Image Contemporaine or CIC was a contemporary art exhibition centre in Geneva, Switzerland. CIC was established in 1985 to organize events and exhibitions of images using new technologies such as video, multimedia, and the Internet, as well as more traditional photography and film. It was also named Saint-Gervais Genève (or SGG) between 1985 and 2008 when including several departments: Electronic media, Exhibitions, Theatre. Its existence goes from 1985 to 2008.

The CIC was established in 1985 to organize events in the field of electronic media. Director Andre Iten immediately included video, film, TV programmes and created the festival "The International video week" the same year (which was renamed "Biennial of Moving Images" in 1997). The Biennial gained international attention with major film and video retrospectives of Vito Acconci, Michel Auder, Harun Farocki, Robert Filliou, Jochen Gerz, Jean-Luc Godard, Gary Hill, Thomas Hirschhorn, William Kentridge, Nam June Paik, Jean Painlevé, Artavazd Pelechian, Carole Roussopoulos, Roman Signer, Pierrick Sorin, Steina and Woody Vasulka, Bill Viola, William Wegman, Anna Winteler, Chris Marker, Guy Debord, Joan Jonas, Stan Brackage, Philippe Garrel, Chantal Akerman, Anna Sanders Films, Rebecca Horn.

Andre Iten carried out numerous collaborations with institutions, festivals and personalities around the globe. His strong vision and attention towards media by initiating festivals, Internet sites, artistic multimedia productions, a public video collection and collaborating on European projects. The CIC co-produced with Centre Georges Pompidou from Paris and Museum Ludwig from Cologne the first internet video archive of new media art.

Andre Iten was also the first to invite curator Simon Lamunière to do exhibitions with video and photography as well as to challenge digital media, websites and cd roms. The long term collaboration with the curator between 1989 and 2004, led to major changes in perception of what was called video art or digital media, and led to renaming the "International Video week" as "Biennial of Moving Images" and the creation of a second biennial devoted to digital culture.

In 1994, the biennial "Version" focussed on the evolution of society and digital media. CD-roms were edited and first websites produced. In 1997, as curator of the documenta X website, Simon Lamunière commissioned several internet projects with artists Matt Mullican Martin Kippenberger, Antoni Muntadas, jodi, Heath Bunting, Herve Graumann in coproduction with the CIC.

The Centre pour l'Image Contemporaine also gained attention by constituting the most important Swiss media library with more than 1000 titles, including complete video works by Vito Acconci, Hanspeter Ammann, Laurie Anderson, Emmanuelle Antille, Marina Abramović and Ulay, Michel Auder, John Baldessari, René Bauermeister, Samuel Beckett, Saddie Benning, Robert Breer, John Cage, Claude Closky, Douglas Davis, Sylvie et Chérif Defraoui, Jan Duyvendak, Harun Farocki, Robert Filliou, Oskar Fischinger, Sylvie Fleury, Jochen Gerz, Joe Gibbons, Jean-Luc Godard, Hervé Graumann Fabrice Gygi, Alexander Hahn, Lothar Hempel, Gary Hill, Thomas Hirschhorn, Hubbard / Birchler, William Kentridge, Simon Lamunière, Jérôme Leuba, Korpys-Loeffler, Klara Kuchta, Tracy Moffat, Avi Mograbi, Gianni Motti, Jean Otth, Nam June Paik, Jean Painlevé, Artavazd Pelechian, Pipilotti Rist, Carole Roussopoulos, Daniel Schibli, Richard Serra, Roman Signer, Pierrick Sorin, Beat Streuli, Nelson Sullivan, Steina Vasulka and Woody Vasulka, Bill Viola, William Wegman, Ingrid Wildi, Bob Wilson, Anna Winteler.

The CIC was shut down after Andre Iten's death in 2008, and its mission transferred in 2010 on one hand to the Centre d'art contemporain (CAC) for its Biennial of the Moving Image, and on the second hand to the FMAC concerning the media library.
