= Bill Etra =

William Etra (March 27, 1947 – August 26, 2016) was a live video pioneer and the co-inventor (with Steve Rutt) of the Rutt/Etra Video Synthesizer.

Etra was born in Manhattan and raised in Lawrence, Nassau County, New York.

Etra worked briefly as a professional cameraman, then studied film at New York University. He began teaching experimental television at NYU before he graduated.

In 1971, Etra and video artists Steina and Woody Vasulka started a performance space at The Kitchen.

Using the Rutt-Etra synthesizer, Etra made Narcissikon with his wife Louise.“This was my first Rutt-Etra piece. The initial picture is Louise sitting against a black background. She’s got an output monitor she can watch, and I put it in a circle wipe, feed it into the Rutt-Etra synthesizer, get a white line wipe, put Louise’s face into that, take it out of the Rutt-Etra, and outline it in the synthesizer, and Louise is on the intercom, and she’s talking to me and I’m talking to her, and we actually ran through it twice."

Another early piece was Heartbeat, in which Louise Etra sits in a chair in a studio, while a circle bounces on screen, blipping in time to her amplified heartbeat. Bill comes in and kisses her; the sound grows; the circle bounces larger. Then he goes back to the control room, she relaxes, and the circle returns to normal.

At WNET, Etra created a video based on an Edgar Allan Poe story, Silence, with David Silver narrating. “That scared me so much I stayed away from narrative for years and years,” Etra commented.

Etra attempted a symphonic work at the Strasenburgh Planetarium in Rochester, New York, when Central Maine Power Music Company played space music, to the accompaniment of the star maps of the planetarium, plus Etra’s video pictures of the musicians projected onto the stars.

He worked for Warner-Atari, Sun Microsystems, and Lucasfilm, and produced digital video for New York clubs and theater.

== Books ==
- Price, Jonathan, 'Video Visions: a Medium Discovers Itself', New American Library, New York City, 1977, ASIN: B00ECDT4V2
