= Vertical Roll =

1972 video art piece by Joan Jonas

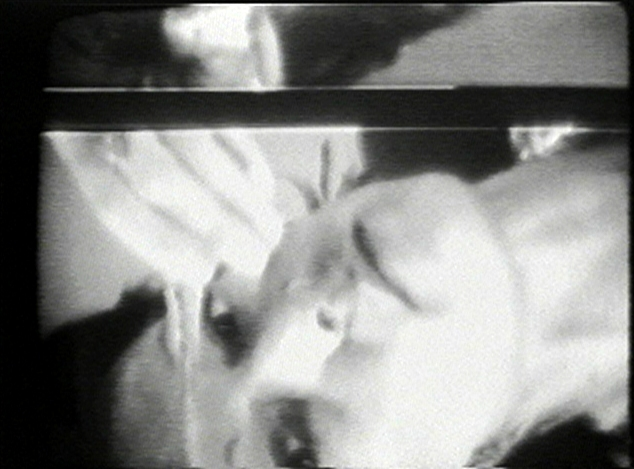
Still from Vertical Roll

Vertical Roll is a 1972 video art piece by American video and performance artist Joan Jonas. It is a sequel to Jonas' first video work Organic Honey's Visual Telepathy. Jonas' interfacing with the material grammar of video was significant to the late 1960s and early 1970s experimentation with new video technology. Among others, Steina and Woody Vasulka, Nam June Paik and Peter Campus also contributed to the emergent material discourse of video art.

== The video ==
Shot in Ace Gallery Los Angeles, Vertical Roll features Jonas performing a series of actions under her alter-ego Organic Honey, the belly dancer. The video was shot during one of the rehearsals for Jonas' Organic Honey performance, and while it is mostly based on the structure of a vertical roll it does contain some images from Visual Telepathy. To Jonas the video offered a new means to approach perception and offer "multiple and simultaneous points of view". Vertical Roll provided Jonas a means to explore the disjunction between performance and a recording of that performance. She places a heavy emphasis on time, and both physical and mental space in her explanation of the work.

=== The Vertical Roll ===
Vertical Roll combines both video and the performance space. As an installation alongside the Organic Honey performance it makes use of both live action and recorded video. The performance, on and off camera, plays on the disjunction between the two modes of presentation. Jonas' intentional mediation of "the monitor's receiving and transmitting frequencies" causes the image being displayed to repeatedly travel vertically from the bottom of the screen to the top resulting in the "vertical roll" for which the piece is titled. The vertical roll, in and of itself, is one "of the primary technical features of video". Jonas' manipulation of the vertical hold function on a CRT monitor to mimic the vertical movement of film through a projector, placing the piece in clear dialog with the cinematic tradition. This dialog is seen in Jonas' technical handling of the video in which video "shifts have to become registered either by camera movement... or by cutting".

Cast as an “electronic erotic seductress,” the multiple costumes and roles performed by Jonas critically examine the ever-changing, but consistently unequal roles of women. The Organic Honey videos showcased Jonas' early exploration into "the narcissistic qualities of video" and would later provide the foundation for proceeding video works. The camera gazes at Jonas, implicating the viewer in the work and further, with her body. Jonas presents her collection of images through multiple perspectives that are dependent "in terms of the camera's distance and its orientation to horizontal ground". The de-synchronization of the monitor's receiving and transmitting frequencies results in the constant wiping away of the images on screen which renders the images recognizable but gives them the illusion of being invisible. The illusion created is perceptual. it is "one of a continuous dissolve through time and space". Vertical Roll introduces the paradigm of the body existing in a space between the video and the monitor. The monitor becomes a metaphorical stand-in for the reel and this metaphor is only further enhanced through the continuous action of the vertical roll which references the "physical reality of the tape deck". Creating a sense of fragmentation, the vertical roll relentlessly pounds at the images of the artist as she moves through a series of performed identities. Characterized a "disjunctive self portrait" by the Electronic Arts Intermix, the image content of the work is strongly mediated by the mirror-like function of the camera, scrutinized by the lens and subjected to violence by the vertical roll.

=== De-synchronization ===
The disparity between the video monitor, the repeating percussive sound, and the on-screen image are examples of the use of de-synchronization as a conceptual tool for revealing the contingency of perceptual experience. This disparity relies on the instability of Jonas' images juxtaposed with their cementation as visible through the use of the video medium. An example of the perceptual confusions created in Jonas' Vertical Roll can be seen in the sequence where "Jonas bangs a spoon against a mirror, creating the illusions of a relationship between the sounds and the image disturbance". Jonas matches action and sound to the timing of the vertical roll which creates the idea of simultaneous occurrences in the video.

Temporality is made a part of Vertical Roll through the disjunctive nature of the video, and this sense of time is "understood as propulsion towards an end." Time is visualized through a constant wiping away of the image. Through de-synchronization, the artist posed a challenge to the supposed objectivity of experience from the senses, potentially uncovering pretenses or dispositions that inform the processing of sensory data. The images on screen seem to decompose in their constant scanning from the bottom to the top of the screen. Jonas further enhances the effects of de-synchronization through her movements which are "choreographed in relation to the action of the vertical roll."

Jonas explores the notion of the frame extensively in Vertical Roll as an expression of “standing one’s ground against external forces.” By recording a CRT playing back video, Jonas creates a frame within a frame, and then creating the image that the frame is collapsing in on itself every half second or so by adjusting the vertical roll on the monitor. While visually excluding the outside world nearly the entire piece, sounds accompanying the crashing frame dictate some kind of external operator attempting to beat along with the CRT's image, expanding the scope of the piece beyond the video. In the concluding moments of her video Jonas breaks the frame entirely when she inserts her head in between the camera and the monitor, entering from the outer edge of the frame, destroying the symbolic wall the camera creates and adding another level of spatial fragmentation and self-reflection. The introduction of Jonas' head is an act of agency independent of the vertical roll. It renders the vertical roll visible and reveals the space of the video to the viewer, shattering its perceptual illusion. The disjunction caused by the concluding moments of this video highlights the implications of video presented, or displayed, in the space of the monitor.

Jonas claims that Vertical Roll finds a likeness to The Garden of Forking Paths, a work by Jorge Luis Borges.
