= Steve Rutt =

- Born: Steven Alexander Rutt; February 26, 1945; Manhattan, New York City, U.S.
- Died: May 20, 2011 (aged 66); Manhattan, New York City, U.S.
- Occupations: Engineer, inventor, artist
- Known for: Rutt/Etra Video Synthesizer

Steven Alexander Rutt (February 26, 1945 – May 20, 2011) was an American engineer, inventor, and artist who developed the Rutt/Etra Video Synthesizer with Bill Etra in 1972. The synthesizer was used by video artists including Nam June Paik, Steina Vasulka, and Woody Vasulka.

The device was used to create the logo of the fictional Union Broadcasting System in the 1976 film Network.

Rutt was born in Manhattan and raised in Great Neck, Long Island. Etra had previously worked with Nam June Paik's raster-manipulation equipment at the WNET Television Laboratory. He later collaborated with Rutt on the development of the Rutt/Etra synthesizer. A prototype was produced in 1972–73 with support from the New York State Council on the Arts.

Rutt was the longtime owner of Rutt Video & Interactive, a video post-production company in Manhattan. His marriage to Rebecca L. McGriff ended in divorce; they had a daughter, Victoria Rutt.

Rutt died of pancreatic cancer in Manhattan on May 20, 2011, aged 66.
