= Jack Early =

American artist

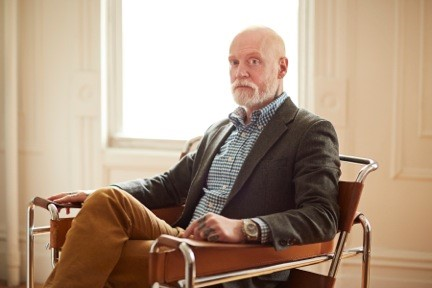
- Image of artist, Jack Early, 2014
- Born: August 16, 1962; Raleigh, North Carolina
- Movement: Pop art, Conceptual art

Jack Early (born August 16, 1962) is a contemporary artist known for exploring the American identity. Early works with a Pop vocabulary combining it with biographical details and personal elements of his life. His work builds on cultural references and continues to evolve through his experience with the media and an ever-changing self. Early currently lives and works in Brooklyn, New York.

== Life and work ==
Early was born in 1962 in Raleigh, North Carolina, graduating from North Carolina School of the Arts. His ascent to fame began in the late 1980s as one-half of the duo Pruitt-Early, Rob Pruitt being the other half. Pruitt-Early's irreverent work challenged prevailing orthodoxies and blurred the boundaries between low culture and high art.

Their first solo show, Artwork for Teenage Boys, was held in 1990 at 303 Gallery, New York. Pruitt-Early quickly garnered attention, and in 1992 they presented an exhibition, Red, Black, Green, Red, White and Blue, at Leo Castelli Gallery. Following the Castelli show, which was misunderstood and infamously panned, Early went into self-imposed exile from the art world. In recent years, Pruitt-Early's artworks have been reappraised and increasingly hailed by collectors, critics, and museums.

Early began writing songs, which have become integral to many of his new art objects. Since 2009, he has been making objects that explore the breadth of American pop culture. Glenn O’Brien describes Early as a “new sort of bluesman…making work that reflects the lonesome road he’s been on, a road that goes through Jesus, Jesus Christ Superstar, John and Yoko, protest movements, and the United Federation of Planets.” In 2015 he released Jack Early's life story in just under 20 minutes! on vinyl.

2018-19 Recipient of the Pollock-Krasner Foundation Grant Award

== Exhibitions ==
Recent exhibitions include These Letters Don't Run, Keijsers Koning Gallery, Dallas, 2025; Jack Early's Greatest Hits, Wilson Arts, Wilson, North Carolina, 2024; Rainbow, Mulier Mulier Gallery, Belgium, 2017; A Better Yesterday, Contemporary Arts Museum Houston, 2017; Jack Early, Fergus McCaffrey, New York, 2016; Jack Early, The Suburban, Milwaukee, 2016; Jack Early, Fergus McCaffrey, Art Basel Miami Beach, 2014; Jack Early: WWJD, Southfirst, Brooklyn, 2012; Jack Early: Gallery Peace, McCaffrey Fine Art, New York, 2012; Jack Early: What To Do With a Drunken Sailor, Forever and Today, New York, 2011; Mapping the Studio: Artists from the François Pinault Collection, Palazzo Grassi, Venice 2009-11 and Pop Life: Art in a Material World, Tate Modern, London, 2009–10.

Early is currently represented by Fergus McCaffrey in New York, Mulier Mulier Gallery in Belgium., and Keijsers Koning in Dallas.
