= Jonathan Horowitz =

American artist (born 1966)

Jonathan Horowitz (born 1966) is a New York-based artist working in video, sculpture, sound installation, and photography. Horowitz's works focuses on the cultures of politics, celebrity, cinema, war, and consumerism. From found footage, Horowitz visually and spatially juxtaposes elements from film, television, and the media to reveal connections and breakdowns between these overlapping modes of communication.

In 2005, Horowitz's work Three Rainbow American Flags for Jasper in the Style of the Artist's Boyfriend made of Oil and Glitter on Linen, depicts a glittery American flag with rainbow stripes. This work references Jasper Johns' 1958 painting Three Flags .

In 2020, Horowitz curated the exhibit We Fight to Build a Free World: An Exhibition by Jonathan Horowitz for The Jewish Museum. Bringing together works by over 70 artists, including Horowitz's own work, "the exhibition looks at how artists have historically responded to the rise of authoritarianism and xenophobia as well as racism, anti-Semitism, and other forms of bigotry. The exhibition also addresses issues surrounding immigration, assimilation, and cultural identity."

== Early life and education ==
Horowitz is a 1987 graduate of Wesleyan University.

== Art market ==
Horowitz is represented by Xavier Hufkens. Until 2020, he also worked with Gavin Brown's Enterprise.

== Solo exhibitions ==
2018 Leftover Paint Abstractions, Xavier Hufkens, Brussels

2016 Occupy Greenwich, The Brant Foundation Art and Study Center, Greenwich
160 DOTS, Swiss Institute, New York
Hillary Clinton Is A Person Too (2008), Museum of Contemporary Art Detroit

2014 Plants, Mirrors, Coke/Pepsi Paintings and More, Xavier Hufkens, Brussels
402 Dots, Line, and the One Note Samba, Karma, New York

2013 Free Store, Art Basel Miami

2012 "Your Land/My Land: Election '12," Contemporary Art Museum St. Louis, Contemporary Art Museum Raleigh, Arm and Hammer Museum of Art and Culture, Contemporary Art Museum Houston, Utah Museum of Contemporary Art New Museum of Contemporary Art, Telfair Museums, St. Louis, MO, Raleigh, NC, Los Angeles, Houston, TX, Salt Lake City, New York, Savannah, GA

2010 "Minimalist Works from the Holocaust Museum," Dundee Contemporary Arts

2009 Apocalypto Now, Museum Ludwig, Cologne "Jonathan Horowitz: And/Or" P.S. 1 Contemporary Art Center, New York

2008 Obama 2008 Gavin Brown's Enterprise

2007 People Like War Movies Galerie Barbara Weiss, Berlin

2006 Rome, Sadie Coles HQ, London

2005 The New Communism, Gavin Brown’s Enterprise
Silent Movie, Yvon Lambert Gallery, New York

2004 Galerie Barbara Weiss, Berlin

2003 Silent Movie, Matrix 151, Wadsworth Atheneum Museum of Art, Hartford, CT
Surreal Estate, (with Rob Pruitt), Gavin Brown's Enterprise
Buero Friedrich, Berlin
Yvon Lambert, Paris

2002 Go Vegan!, Greene Naftali Gallery, New York
Pillow Talk, Sadie Coles HQ, London

2001 Time, Life, People: Jonathan Horowitz at Kunsthalle St. Gallen, Switzerland
Yvon Lambert, Paris
We the People, China Art Objects Galleries, Los Angeles
In Person, Bard College Center for Curatorial Studies, Annandale-on-Hudson, NY.

2000 The Jonathan Horowitz Show, Greene Naftali Gallery, New York
The Universal Calendar/talking without thinking, Van Laere Contemporary Art, Antwerp, Belgium

1998 Bach Two Part Invention #9, Kenny Schachter/Rove, New York
Maxell, Greene Naftali Gallery
