= Gavin Brown's Enterprise =

Art galleries in the U.S. and Italy

Coordinates: 40.731°N 74.008°W

Gavin Brown's enterprise was an art gallery with venues in New York City and Rome owned by Gavin Brown between 1994 and 2020. In 2020, it merged with Gladstone Gallery.

== History ==
=== Broome Street ===
The gallery was established by Gavin Brown in 1994 on Broome Street, in the west SoHo neighborhood of New York City. In 1993, prior to opening the Broome Street location, Brown installed an exhibition of Elizabeth Peyton drawings in a room at the Hotel Chelsea – considered one of the first shows to fall under the umbrella of “Gavin Brown’s enterprise.”

The inaugural show at the Broome Street location was an exhibition by the British artist Steven Pippin. Pippin transformed the gallery space into a camera obscura, and in doing so quickly established the unconventional meter that has since become a defining characteristic of the gallery's approach. Other early shows at GBE include a show of paintings by Peter Doig, Catherine Opie photographs, and a two-person show of works by Andy Warhol and Rirkrit Tiravanija. The final show at the Broome Street location was a solo exhibition by James Angus.

=== Relocation to Meatpacking District ===
In 1997, Gavin Brown's enterprise moved to the Meatpacking District of Manhattan. A few years later in 1999, Brown also opened a bar, Passerby, on West 15th Street next door to the gallery. Notably, the bar featured a fully operated disco floor, Untitled (Dance Floor), created by one of Gavin Brown's represented artists, Piotr Uklański that was first created in 1996 at Gavin Brown's Broome Street Gallery. Exhibitions at the second gallery space included early works by the British painter Chris Ofili, installations by Martin Creed, the first show of work by Oliver Payne and Nick Relph, and in 2000, the first of artist Rob Pruitt's famed "flea markets".

=== Relocation to West Village ===
In 2003, Brown moved the gallery to Greenwich Street in the West Village. The gallery continued to present atypical shows like “Drunk vs. Stoned” (an irreverent two-part exhibition that explored different states of intoxication and included a soccer match with opposing teams "drunk" and "stoned" and convivial openings). In 2007, the Swiss artist Urs Fischer produced his show You by digging a massive crater in the gallery's floor. In that same year, Rob Pruitt staged a second “flea market” at the Frieze Art Fair in London in the GBE booth. In 2008, at Tony Shafrazi Gallery, Gavin Brown and Urs Fischer co-curated Who’s Afraid of Jasper Johns – a large group-show installed over a wall reproduction of Shafrazi's Four Friends exhibition. In November 2008, Jonathan Horowitz installed his exhibition Obama ‘08 that focused closely on the pivotal United States presidential election.

In 2008, the Passerby location was closed. Gavin Brown's enterprise relocated to 620 Greenwich Street in New York City. From May 2010, the gallery also occupied the space that its neighbor, famed Manhattan meat purveyors, LaFreida Meats, once occupied. The inaugural exhibition at the expanded site was an exhibition of new work by Horowitz entitled, Go Vegan!

=== Relocation to Harlem ===
In summer 2015, Gavin Brown's enterprise closed its Greenwich Street location and moved to a former brewery at 439 West 127th Street in Harlem, with three floors of exhibition space.

=== Other locations ===
In 2015 Gavin Brown opened a gallery in Rome in a former chapel in Via de Vascellari. In 2007, Brown entered into talks to open a gallery in Los Angeles with L&M, the since-split New York gallery then run by collector and former banker Robert Mnuchin and former auction house specialist Dominique Lévy; these plans were eventually abandoned.

== Artists ==
Artists represented by Gavin Brown's enterprise included:

- Franz Ackermann
- James Angus
- Ed Atkins
- Joe Bradley (2011–2015)
- Kerstin Brätsch
- Martin Creed
- Jeremy Deller
- Peter Doig
- Urs Fischer
- LaToya Ruby Frazier
- Mark Handforth
- Jonathan Horowitz
- Arthur Jafa
- Joan Jonas
- Alex Katz (2011–2020)
- Christopher Knowles
- Mark Leckey
- Bjarne Melgaard (2013-2020)
- Laura Owens
- Oliver Payne and Nick Relph
- Elizabeth Peyton (1993-2014)
- Rob Pruitt
- Anselm Reyle
- Rachel Rose
- Steven Shearer
- Avery Singer (2014–2019)
- Frances Stark
- Sturtevant
- Rirkrit Tiravanija
- Piotr Uklański (–2008)

== Legacy ==
In 2024, Brown donated a range of materials related to the gallery to Bard College’s Center for Curatorial Studies.
