= Avery Singer =

American artist (born 1987)

- Born: 1987; New York, New York
- Occupation: Artist
- Known for: Digitally assisted paintings

Avery Singer (born 1987) is an American artist known for creating digitally assisted paintings created through 3D modeling software and computer-controlled airbrushing.

== Early life and education ==
Singer was born to artists Janet Kusmierski and Greg Singer. She graduated from Cooper Union in 2010. She has since been working out of studios in the Bronx and later in Bushwick, Brooklyn.

== Work ==
In her work, Singer uses architectural, automation and other modelling software (and an animation specialist) to create the backdrop before then airbrushing layers of images using a computer-controlled printer that was designed to transfer logos on to trucks and aeroplanes. The images she uses are oftentimes culled from Internet image searches based in genres and trends inherited from the history of art. She has cited Charline von Heyl as a source of inspiration. In her earlier work, she primarily used a narrow palette of black, white, and grays; only later she started using color.

== Exhibitions ==
In 2016, curator Beatrix Ruf presented Singer's first European museum solo at the Stedelijk Museum in Amsterdam, showing works from 2012 onwards. It was also the first time her work could be seen in the Netherlands. Singer presented the big installation that was so impressive during her exhibition ‘Statements’ in Art Basel in 2015. Since then it is part of the Stedelijk Museum's collection.

She is an applicant for the dearMoon project.

== Collections ==
Singer's paintings are in the public collections of the Museum Ludwig, Stedelijk Museum, The Whitney Museum, the Hammer Museum and the Metropolitan Museum of Art. In 2017, her Google SketchUp–inspired Anxiety Painting (2014) became her first work to enter the collection of the Museum of Modern Art.

== Recognition ==
In 2017, Singer won the annual Prix Jean-François Prat.

== Art market ==
Singer is represented by Hauser & Wirth (since 2020) and Kraupa-Tuskany Zeidler. From 2017 until 2020, she worked with Gavin Brown's Enterprise.

In 2021, Singer's Untitled (Tuesday) (2017) sold for HKD 35 million ($4.5 million) at Christie’s in Hong Kong.
