= Rob Pruitt =

American post-conceptual artist

- Born: 1964; Washington D.C.
- Education: Corcoran College of Art and Design; Parsons School of Design
- Known for: Painting; Installation art; Sculpture

Rob Pruitt (born 1964) is an American post-conceptual artist. Working primarily in painting, installation, and sculpture, he does not have a single style or medium. He considers his work to be intensely personal and biographical.

Pruitt has exhibited extensively in New York and internationally; in 2013 the Aspen Art Museum held his mid-career retrospective.

== Early life and education ==
Pruitt grew up in Rockville, Maryland. He attended Corcoran College of Art and Design, where he became friendly with the admissions director, Tim Gunn. Pruitt transferred to Parsons School of Design when Gunn began teaching there. During college, Pruitt lived at the Chelsea Hotel and says he focused his energy on partying rather than studying.

== Artwork ==
=== Early work ===
Pruitt began exhibiting in the early 1990s with his then collaborator, Jack Early. After a controversial exhibition, Red, Black, Green, Red, White and Blue, at Leo Castelli Gallery their partnership disintegrated and neither had major shows for several years.

While galleries refused to represent his solo work, Pruitt contributed to a few group shows. Pieces from this time dealt with his exclusion from the art world; his first sculpture at Gavin Brown's enterprise was an Evian fountain, which, as Mia Fineman points out, is related to baptism and rebirth.

In 1998 Pruitt caused another minor scandal with a piece called Cocaine Buffet which was shown at The Fifth International, Chivas Clem's artists-run space. The show was co-curated by Jennifer Bornstein. He installed a 16-foot mirror with a line of real cocaine running down the center, in which visitors were welcome to partake. Publicity stunt, peace offering, minimalist sculpture, or indictment of the greed and glamour of the art world, it changed the sensation associated with his name.

=== 101 Art Ideas You Can Do Yourself ===
The following year Pruitt held his first solo show, “101 Art Ideas You Can Do Yourself,” where he applied humor to the genre of language-based conceptual art. The recipe-style book was filled with instructions for making and decorating such as “Paint secret paintings on walls with glow in the dark paint” and “Draw yourself into your favorite comic strip.” Others were suggestions on how to interact with the world in a different way, like “Sit on the toilet backwards” and “Go on an animal photo safari in a city: dogs, cats, pigeons, rats, and squirrels.”

The exhibition was thirty-five of these instructions realized, including an exercise bike facing a painting and a pile of pennies on the floor. During the time he was barred from the art world, Pruitt briefly worked for Martha Stewart Living, coming up with DIY craft ideas; a DIY sensibility runs throughout his work.

=== Pandas ===
In 2001 Pruitt showed the first of the glittery panda paintings that would become his trademark. He explains his choice of subject matter thus: “I see it as a kind of corporate damage control -- like trying to market Perrier after they found benzene in it, or Firestone tires after they exploded. I was a reviled figure, but everybody loves a panda.” He remembers childhood visits to the giant pandas at the National Zoo. Pruitt has made many versions his panda painting using different techniques and stylizations of the same subject matter.

Critic Michelle Grabner analyzes the panda project thus: “The paintings' clichéd imagery neutralizes their real endangered status making us less culpable in the creatures' pending extinction. And therein lies the beauty of the clichéd image." She goes on, "This appropriation of similes, once strictly the providence of kitsch, has nothing to do with blurring the distinctions between high and low. Instead, rainbows and butterflies have come to symbolize a magical new world where order is without hierarchies, edification is without snobbishness[…]Pruitt produces his art without the slightest glance of irony. He makes glamorous and admirable our drive for worldly success while commiserating with our search for inner virtue.” Although the paintings are designed and tightly crafted, they are imperfect; the artist's hand is evident. His use of glitter has been compared to Andy Warhol's diamond dust, but Pruitt describes his own work as “basically blown up versions of dining table craft projects... I’ve really enjoyed letting the world know that not everything is so mystified or so regulated to expertise—that you can make something really beautiful with a little ingenuity and some supplies from Michael’s.”

Pruitt collaborated with Jimmy Choo in 2012 to create a line of shoes and handbags featuring panda bears and animal prints.

In 2013 Pruitt installed his "Last Panda" show at Gavin Brown's defunct bar, the Passerby. The space, which was destroyed by Hurricane Sandy, provided an apocalyptic setting for his rainbow-colored work.

=== Flea Market ===
Pruitt began his Flea Market happening for the 1999 Gavin Brown summer show. He invited artist friends to set up tables and sell whatever they wanted, be it their own artwork or junk from their apartment. The gallery space became a place to socialize with the artist, creating a feeling of community between makers and sellers. The Flea Market has since been repeated at art fairs and museums.

For the market's latest iteration, Pruitt is running an eBay store, which features a curated selection from his collection of secondhand objects. He also regularly attends estate sales, where he continues to discover new items for his collection.

=== Art Awards ===
The Guggenheim approached him in 2009 to reimagine their annual fund-raising event. Instead of the usual gala, Pruitt conceived a performance piece: a tongue-in-cheek, Oscars-style award show, with nominees for categories like Solo Gallery Show of the Year, Critic of the Year, and Best New Artist. Like much of Pruitt's work, the show falls somewhere between sincerity and parody. Although it is not unheard of to give awards for fine art (in Britain, for example, the Tate awards the prestigious Turner Prize), Pruitt's Art Awards are not universally popular with critics. Artist of the Year Mary Heilmann describes them as “serious and deep and cheesy at the same time.”

The 2013 rendition of the art awards appeared in Art in America and featured selfies of the nominees.

=== Pattern and Degradation ===
2010 saw Pruitt's sprawling solo show “Pattern and Degradation,” which was considered confirmation of his part of the art establishment. The show was held at Gavin Brown and spilled over to the nearby gallery Maccarone Inc.

It featured brightly patterned paintings influenced by Amish quilt designs. Pruitt was inspired by the idea of rumspringa, a time when Amish youths leave their community to experience the broader world before returning to the church and responsibility. He describes an artist's life as a kind of perpetual rumspringa, less constrained as artists are from the traditional expectations of society.

The show also included humanoid monsters made out of trash, collaged self-portraits, candy-filled stacks of painted tires, and photorealistic paintings of Cinnabon cinnamon rolls with geometrically piped paint for icing. Randy Kennedy describes a unifying theme to the multivalent show: “Everything in it seems to pivot on the idea of pattern and design as a valiant but usually doomed attempt to impose some order and beauty on a random, chaotic world.”

=== Gradient paintings ===
Pruitt has made a variety of paintings with colored gradients. The “Faces” series are scrawled line drawings of features that are then transferred onto gradients and flocked. Reminiscent of emoji, each face has a distinct emotion or personality.

These developed into a later series called “The Suicide Paintings,” window-like portals consisting of pure gradients juxtaposed by a differently colored frame. While the gradients are close to perfect, they are not digitally generated. These paintings were installed with chromed television sets and stacks of black and white cubes. They look like color studies, polluted vistas, and screen savers. Critic Florence Waters describes her experience with the work: "The absence of a story is made alarming by the scale and intensity of the encounter with colour on canvas."

=== Other projects ===
Pruitt and Jonathan Horowitz collaborated on an installation piece called Peacock Hill. In 2003 they bought a ramshackle, eleven-bedroom Victorian mansion in Fleischmanns, New York, painted it black, and decorated it like a haunted house with faux taxidermy and gothic furniture. Outside they arranged a graveyard using plywood tombstones with sardonic inscriptions. Ken Johnson compared it to the self-mocking art-as-life collaborations of Gilbert and George but overall described the project, as it was presented in a 2003 exhibit at Gavin Brown's Enterprise, as "self-congratulatory."

Pruitt used tombstones again in a 2008 show where he created monuments for celebrities who had died the previous year. They were installed in a room whose walls were papered in a year's worth of iPhone photographs.

In 2011 Pruitt created "The Andy Monument" for the Public Art Fund; it is a ten-foot-tall, chrome-finished statue of Andy Warhol. The sculpture resided outside the building that housed Warhol's Factory in the 1970s and early 1980s.

In 2016, Pruitt collaborated with the retailer J. Crew to design a limited edition piece of clothing: a rash guard inspired by his color gradient work. The Rob Pruitt™ for J. Crew Rash Guard retails for $125.00, with half of the proceeds donated to charity.

A recent demonstration of his work was showcased as part of the Desert X exhibit in the Coachella Valley from February 25 - April 30, 2017.

== Art market ==
Represented by Gavin Brown's Enterprise and Massimo De Carlo, Pruitt shows regularly at art fairs. He is also known for throwing parties; on April 20, 2013 he turned MOCA's annual gala into a weed-themed bacchanalia, which raised over two million dollars.

In June 2013 his work set a record price at a Christie's charity auction when a panda painting sold for $315,000, over twice its estimated value.

== Personal life ==
Pruitt currently resides in New York City with his partner Jonathan Horowitz, who is also an artist.

== Published works ==
- Pruitt, Rob (October 12, 2011). Exquisite Self-Portrait: The Artist. New York: Karma. ISBN 978-0982100691.
- Pruitt, Rob (March 1, 2010). Pop Touched Me: The Art of Rob Pruitt. Abrams Books. ISBN 978-0810954328.
- Pruitt, Rob (2008). iPruitt. New York: Gavin Brown's enterprise.
