= Dimitri Devyatkin =

American screenwriter and filmmaker (born 1949)

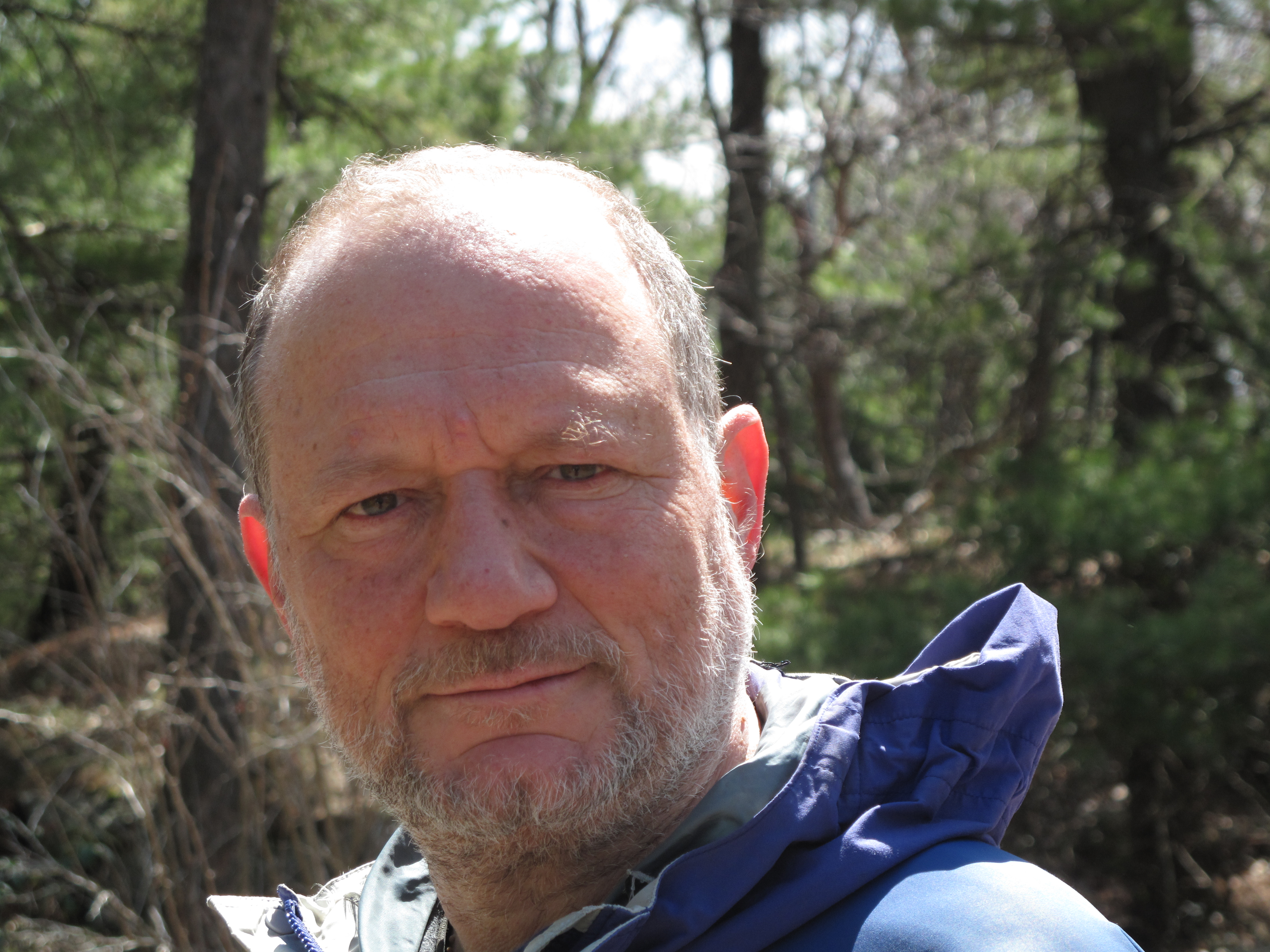
- Dimitri Devyatkin in 2013
- Born: July 31, 1949 (age 76); Manhattan, New York, United States
- Education: Bronx Science High School, St. John's College, VGIK: Moscow Institute of Cinema, Moscow State University
- Known for: Video art, filmmaking
- Notable work: Video from Russia: The People Speak (1984), El Salvador: Names of War (1986), It Rains Again on Brighton Beach (1992), The Sordid Affair (1973)
- Awards: Emmy Nomination, Los Angeles (1984)

Dimitri Devyatkin (born July 31, 1949) is an American director, producer, screenwriter, video artist, and journalist. Devyatkin uses elements of humor, art and new technology in his work. He is known as one of the first video makers to combine abstract synthesized imagery with camera footage. His programs have been broadcast domestically and internationally on ABC, PBS, Channel 4, WDR, France 3, TF1 and Channel One Russia. His works consist of digital media, computer art, broadcast news and feature filmmaking. His activities in the creation of new independent US filmmaking have been documented by Jonas Mekas in "Birth of a Nation" (1997).

== Early life ==
Devyatkin grew up in Manhattan, New York. During his childhood, he was neighbors with young Kareem Abdul-Jabbar. Devyatkin attended New York City public schools, including the Bronx High School of Science. He studied Classics at St. John's College.

Devyatkin studied classical violin from the age of twelve at the Greenwich House Music School. While in high school, he played violin with youth orchestras in Carnegie Hall and Lincoln Center. Devyatkin studied modern music composition with Grammy-winning composer Joan Tower. In California, aged 17, he spent a summer playing electric violin with the legendary jazz saxophonist Rahsaan Roland Kirk.

Devyatkin is of Russian heritage.

== Video making ==
=== Early works ===
In 1971, he began experimenting with abstract video art, while living in Santa Barbara, California. That year, Devyatkin met Nam June Paik, who advised him to visit the newly organized theater The Kitchen in New York. Upon meeting the founders, Steina and Woody Vasulka, he became the video director between 1971 and 1973, organizing video and electronic art performances nearly every day for two years. He organized video shows in the United States and Europe. These include a US Department of State sponsored tour of Amerika Haus centers in six German cities and shows at the American Cultural Centers in Paris and London.

=== Film studies in Russia ===
In 1973, Devyatkin went to Moscow as an exchange student, studying Russian at Moscow State University and documentary film making under Russian director Roman Karmen at VGIK, the Gerasimov Institute of Cinematography. He met and worked with many other famous Russian filmmakers and participated in several popular feature films. Devyatkin videotaped performances by the Taganka Theatre, including Hamlet starring Russian actor Vladimir Vysotsky, and the play Ten Days That Shook the World based on the book of the same name.(see)

=== Digital video art ===
Devyatkin organized an international Computer Arts Festival at The Kitchen, which was held successfully for four years. At the 1973 festival, Devyatkin introduced early examples of computer generated film, video, graphics and music from around the world. According to The New York Times, Devyatkin presented "a remarkably beautiful series of color alterations and shape distortions." Devyatkin's video piece The Sordid Affair is an outstanding example of political video art, a full expression of free speech.(see)

=== Hidden human potential ===
Thanks to his friendship with visionary Joseph Goldin, Devyatkin documented experiments and demonstrations of hidden mental abilities. He videotaped music and light psychotherapy experiments conducted by Natalia Bekhtereva and psychological teaching methods such as Suggestopedia. Devyatkin's work is mentioned in Psychic Discoveries Behind the Iron Curtain. Devyatkin's 1974 documentary Suggestopedia: A Science of Learning was shown widely.(see) In his ongoing coverage of hidden human potential, Devyatkin recorded Porfiry Ivanov, origins of the Lamaze technique and experiments in teaching newborn babies to swim.(see)

=== Video art in New York ===
In 1978, Devyatkin collaborated with Nam June Paik to produce a light hearted comparison of life in the two cities, Media Shuttle: New York-Moscow on WNET. The video is held in museum collections around the world. He documented the marriage of two Fluxus pioneers, George Maciunas and Billie Hutching, in a series of Fluxus style performances in SoHo, Manhattan. In 1978, he assisted the artist Charlotte Moorman to organize the Annual Avant Garde Festival of New York held that year on the Staten Island Ferry. He spent time with John Lennon and invited him to teach a course the next day at the alternative high school where he was teaching, Elizabeth Cleaners Street School.

== Renowned solo productions ==
=== Video from Russia: The People Speak ===
In 1983, Devyatkin directed Video From Russia: The People Speak, which was narrated by Margot Kidder.(see) It was aired on KABC-TV four times, WABC-TV, France 3 and Channel 4. It was nominated for an Emmy in Los Angeles. The program was described as "a rare opportunity to hear spontaneous comments from people who are lumped together in political rhetoric as our enemy." It was awarded the gold medal at the New York International Video Festival in 1984. The project had Devyatkin travel throughout Russia, visiting six cities, and interviewing anyone on the street. None of these interviews were set up in advance, and they aimed to gain public opinion on the Cold War from the people of Russia. The interviews focused on toppling the ideologies and misconceptions that arise within Russia during the Cold War, along with bringing forth the common consensus from the citizens in Russia: wanting peace.

=== El Salvador: Names of War ===
Throughout the 1980s, Devyatkin produced independent films and videos in New York City. After the success of Video From Russia, he spent 6 weeks in El Salvador covering the civil war in areas controlled by the FMLN. The 1986 program, El Salvador: Names of War, shows the human face of the war. He worked with cameraman Eddie Becker and translator Berta Silva in the mountains of El Salvador to shoot battles and everyday life.(see)

=== Verkola: A Village in Northern Russia ===
Devyatkin directed Verkola: A Village in Northern Russia in 1986. It was sponsored by TPT, PBS, Channel 4, and France 2. The program is a portrait of life in a tiny village near Arkhangelsk.

== Other work ==
=== As a producer ===
He started working for CBS News in 1988 to cover the Moscow Summit between US President Ronald Reagan and Soviet leader Mikhail Gorbachev for the CBS Evening News and CBS News Sunday Morning. He was also a producer for Worldwide Television News (WTN), where he covered the dissolution of the Soviet Union, Armenian earthquake in Spitak and the Ecologists' Movement in the Baltic States. During the Glasnost period, Devyatkin was the American co-director on Soviet television for the program titled "Come Together." The Soviet-American co-production documentary followed a peace march of 500 American and Russian activists from St. Petersburg to Moscow. It was one of the first times that dissidents were able to speak on Russian television due to Devyatkin's efforts.(see) Devyatkin produced a series of interviews for MGM with Heroes of the Soviet Union. Those who were interviewed include the liberator of Auschwitz, General Arkady Petrenko and the discoverer of Hitler's corpse, Elena Rzhevskaya.

In 1992, Devyatkin was the line-producer on the Weather Is Good on Deribasovskaya, It Rains Again on Brighton Beach fiction movie. In 2014, it was named one of the 100 Best Russian Films (1992–2013) by Afisha Magazine and Devyatkin was interviewed for the article. During this period, Devyatkin was line producer for five other feature films for Mosfilm, including The House Under the Starry Sky directed by Sergei Solovyov.

Devyatkin worked with Metromedia as a Director of Special Projects based in Moscow. he introduced the television channels Eurosport and Nickelodeon to Russia between 1994 and 1999. He was also General Director of a dubbing studio in the Mosfilm lot. Between 1999 and 2000, Devyatkin worked with Streamedia Communications Inc. as their vice president, Europe in Amsterdam and New York, where he created six content channels on the Internet.

=== As a teacher and public speaker ===
In the early 2000s, Devyatkin was a professor teaching the Digital Video Production course at New York University, SUNY Purchase and Ramapo College. Devyatkin has worked extensively as a public speaker at universities, represented by the Jodi Solomon Speakers Bureau in Boston.

== Video exhibitions and presentations ==
- 1971 and 1973 International Forum for Youth Film, Berlin
- 1971 and 1975 College of Architects, Barcelona
- 1971–1973 The Kitchen, New York
- 1973 Lenbachhaus Museum, Munich
- 1973 Everson Museum of Art, Syracuse
- 1973 Festival d'Avignon, France
- 1973 American Cultural Centers, Paris and London
- 1974 and 1978 Syracuse University
- 1978 Museum of Modern Art, New York
- 2000 State University of New York, Purchase
- 2003–2005 Ramapo College, New Jersey
- 2008 Anna Akhmatova Literary and Memorial Museum, St. Petersburg
- 2013 Bonn International School, Germany
- 2014 Staatliches Museum Schwerin, Germany
- 2022 Electronic Arts Intermix

== See also ==
- List of video artists
