= Ahmed Alsoudani =

American painter

Ahmed Alsoudani (born 1975 in Baghdad, Iraq), came to the United States after fleeing from Iraq in the mid-1990s. He is best known for his vividly colored and surreal acrylic and charcoal canvases, in which distorted, grotesque faces and body parts portray the horrors of war. This motif draws on his own experiences of devastation and violence, evoking a universal experience of conflict and human suffering.

Alsoudani received his MFA in Painting from Yale School of Art in 2008, and also holds a BFA from Maine College of Art. His work was exhibited in the Iraq Pavilion at the 54th Venice Biennale in 2011. In 2012, Alsoudani received his first major institutional exhibition at the Wadsworth Atheneum Museum of Art, and in 2013, the Phoenix Museum of Art and the Portland Museum of Art presented Ahmed Alsoudani: Redacted, accompanied by a fully illustrated catalogue. Recent institutional group exhibitions include Chaos and Awe: Painting for the 21st Century, at the Frist Art Museum and the Chrysler Museum of Art in 2018-2019 and Artists in Exile: Expressions of Loss and Hope at the Yale University Art Gallery in 2017. Forthcoming exhibitions include Bitter Fruit at the Fabric Workshop and Museum, Philadelphia, Pennsylvania and In Between at Palazzo Cipolla, Rome, Italy (both 2021). In 2009, Hatje Cantz Verlag published the artist's first monograph.

Alsoudani's work is included in collections including Virginia Museum of Fine Arts, Wadsworth Atheneum Museum of Art, Phoenix Museum of Art, Portland Museum of Art, Columbus Museum of Art, and the Pinault Foundation, Paris. The artist lives and works in New York, New York.
