= Shridhar Bapat =

Indian video artist

- Born: 1948 (age 77–78); India
- Education: London School of Economics (LSE)
- Movement: Experimental Video Art

Shridhar Bapat (born 1948) was an Indian video artist and key figure in the New York City's downtown video art scene in the 1970s. Bapat's artworks were screened at the MoMA PS1, Whitney Museum of American Art, The Kitchen, and the Mudd Club. He a was an early organizer of video programs at The Kitchen and the Avant-Garde Festivals of New York. He took over as the Director of The Kitchen, an influential experimental artist center in Manhattan, in 1973.

== Early life and education ==
Shridhar Bapat was born in India in 1948. Since his parents were high-ranking Indian diplomats, his family moved to Japan, and then to the United States. Bapat spent most of his childhood in suburban Westchester, New York.

Bapat attended university in Geneva and London, but was expelled from the London School of Economics (LSE) after the 1968 student uprisings. It was in New York City where he started his career as an artist. Bapat learned the basics of video at a class taught by Global Village, one of the first video collectives in the city.

== Video Art ==
Shridhar Bapat's artwork largely involves video and feedback. Bapat's installations would have cameras pointed towards each other, and the viewers would see themselves in self-reflexive self-monitoring loops. He once boasted about being “the best feedback camera turner” in New York.

His piece, Aleph Null (1971) and other video works were exhibited in MoMA PS1, The Kitchen, and the Whitney Museum of Art.

He was described by his peers, including Shirley Clarke, Nam June Paik, Steina and Woody Vasulka, as a brilliant artist. His early video pieces mainly exist as unseen copies in Northwestern University's Special Collections. Bapat's video feedback fantasia Aleph Null (12 min, 1971) was exhibited in MOMA PS1, 2013.

He was well known as a program director and curator. In addition to working at Anthology Film Archives, he became director of The Kitchen and was the first video curator in its earliest period. He co-directed the Women's Video Festival with Susan Milano and the Kitchen Video Festival.

He was also the assistant to many artists such as Shirley Clarke or Nam June Paik. After leaving The Kitchen, he joined Shirley Clark's Video Space Troupe.
