= Frances Stark =

American artist (born 1967)

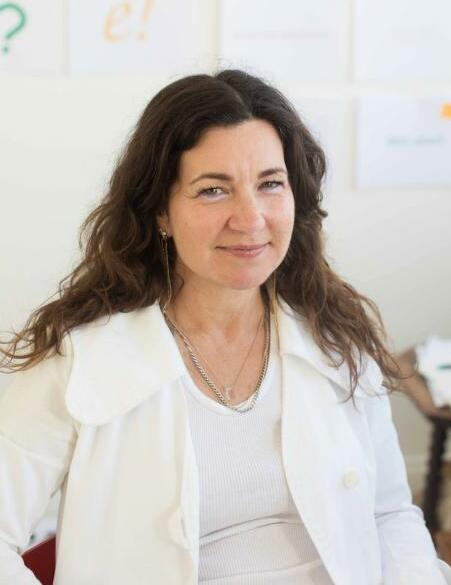
- Frances Stark in 2019
- Born: 1967 (age 58–59); Huntington Beach, California
- Known for: Art, performance, video, writing
- Notable work: My Best Thing

Frances Stark (born 1967) is an interdisciplinary artist and writer, whose work centers on the use and meaning of language, and the translation of this process into the creative act. She often works with carbon paper to hand-trace letters, words, and sentences from classic works by Emily Dickinson, Goethe, Henry Miller, Samuel Beckett, and others to explore the voices and interior states of writers. She uses these hand-traced words, often in repetition, as visual motifs in drawings and mixed media works that reference a subject, mood, or another discipline such as music, architecture, or philosophy.

== Early life and education ==
Born in 1967 in Huntington Beach, California, Frances Stark is a contemporary artist who lives and works in Los Angeles. She graduated from San Francisco State University in 1991 with a BA in Humanities, and from Art Center College of Design in Pasadena in 1993 with an MFA.

== Work ==
Stark is a key figure in the Los Angeles art community. She was formerly an assistant professor at University of Southern California Roski School of Fine Arts.

For more than two decades she has been making poetic works that explore a wide variety of subjects experienced by artists and non-artists alike, including writing, procrastination, the banality of life, failure, success, pride, self-doubt, motherhood, pedagogy, institutional critique, class, music, literature, poetry, philosophy, art, sadness, and relationships. Words and images are at the heart of her practice, and Stark often takes a personal, auto-biographical approach to shared, universal experiences.

=== My Best Thing (2011) ===
The feature-length video work My Best Thing, first presented at the 54th Venice Biennale, stems from an anonymous chat site Stark encountered online. The dialogues between Stark and her chat partners are represented by generalized, cartoon avatars that speak the chat transcripts. The subject matter of these chats range from art and the creative process, to sex and anonymity. The video's form and content show how the new modes of online communication allow for both greater intimacy and anonymity, giving rise to new kinds of behaviors and relationships.

=== Writings ===
Stark is also a writer of prose and poetry that has been published in various magazines, catalogues, and books. Writings include:

- Frances Stark and Ali Subotnick (eds.), (2015) UH-OH: Frances Stark 1991-2015, Hammer Museum
- Frances Stark (2012) My Best Thing, Walther König.
- Frances Stark (2003) Collected Writing: 1993-2003. Book Works.
- Frances Stark (2007) The Collected Works. Walther König.
- Frances Stark (2008) Secession (ed. Annette Südbeck).
- Frances Stark (1999) The Architect & The Housewife, Book Works

== Exhibitions ==
Stark's work had been exhibited internationally, including the 2017 and 2008 Whitney Biennial, the Performa 11 biennial, and the 54th Venice Biennale. Solo exhibitions of Stark's work include 'US Greatest Hits Mixtape: Volume 2' at greengrassi, London (2020), Teen O.P.E.R.A. at Gavin Brown's Enterprise, New York (2018), Uh-Oh: Frances Stark 1991-2015 at The Hammer Museum (2015–16), "Intimism," at the Art Institute of Chicago (2015), "Francis Stark: This could become a gimick [sic] or an honest articulation of the workings of the mind" at the List Visual Arts Center (2010–11), and The Fall of Frances Stark, Van Abbemuseum, Eindoven, (2007).

== Collections ==
Frances Stark's work is included in the following public collections: Her artworks are included in public collections of the Whitney Museum of American Art, New York; Tate, London; Museum of Modern Art, New York; Carnegie Museum of Art, Pittsburgh; the Metropolitan Museum of Art, New York; Art Gallery of Ontario, Toronto; Hirshhorn Museum and Sculpture Garden, Washington D.C.; Museum of Contemporary Art, Los Angeles, the Los Angeles County Museum of Art, di Rosa, the San Francisco Museum of Modern Art, the UCLA Hammer Museum, and Fonds Regional d'art Contemporain, Champagne-Ardenne.
