= Strasenburgh Planetarium =

Public planetarium in New York

Coordinates: 43.152147°N 77.586785°W

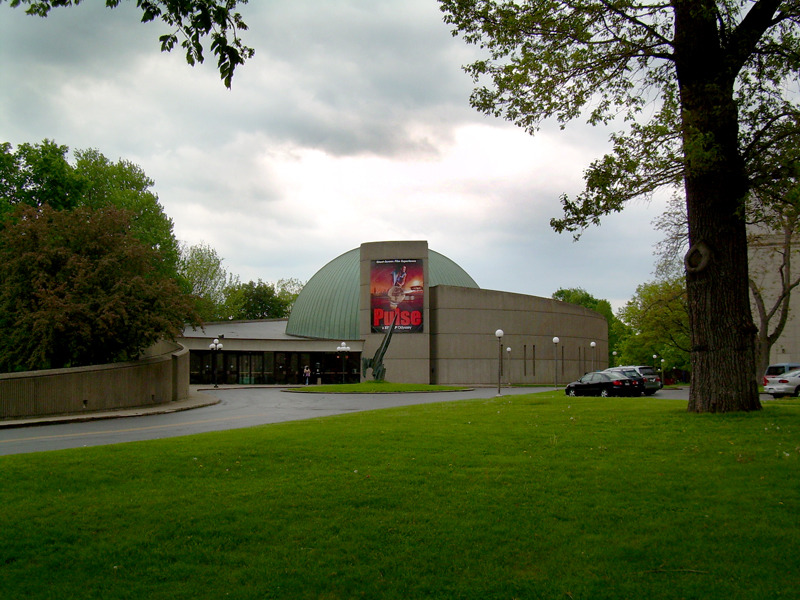
Strasenburgh Planetarium

The Strasenburgh Planetarium is a public planetarium located at 663 East Avenue in the city of Rochester, New York. It is named after its benefactors, Edwin and Clara Strasenburgh. It is a department of the Rochester Museum and Science Center. The Planetarium was dedicated on September 14, 1968. The 65-foot-diameter Star Theater originally seated 240 people. The original seats were replaced in 1985; as currently configured, the theater seats 225. The Star Theater houses the only Zeiss Mark VI planetarium projector still in operation in the United States. While the Zeiss projector is still used for monthly star shows, the Strasenburgh Planetarium has primarily used digital projection systems since 2018.

The planetarium received world-wide attention by being the first to be computer automated. It was known for both its technical and programming innovations. The Strasenburgh Planetarium is still highly regarded and was ranked 7th on USA Today's 10 Best Planetarium list in 2026.

== History ==
In 1935, soon after the opening of major planetariums in Chicago, Philadelphia, New York and Los Angeles, Arthur C. Parker, Director of the Rochester Museum of Arts and Sciences (predecessor to today's Rochester Museum & Science Center), recommended construction of a planetarium in Rochester.

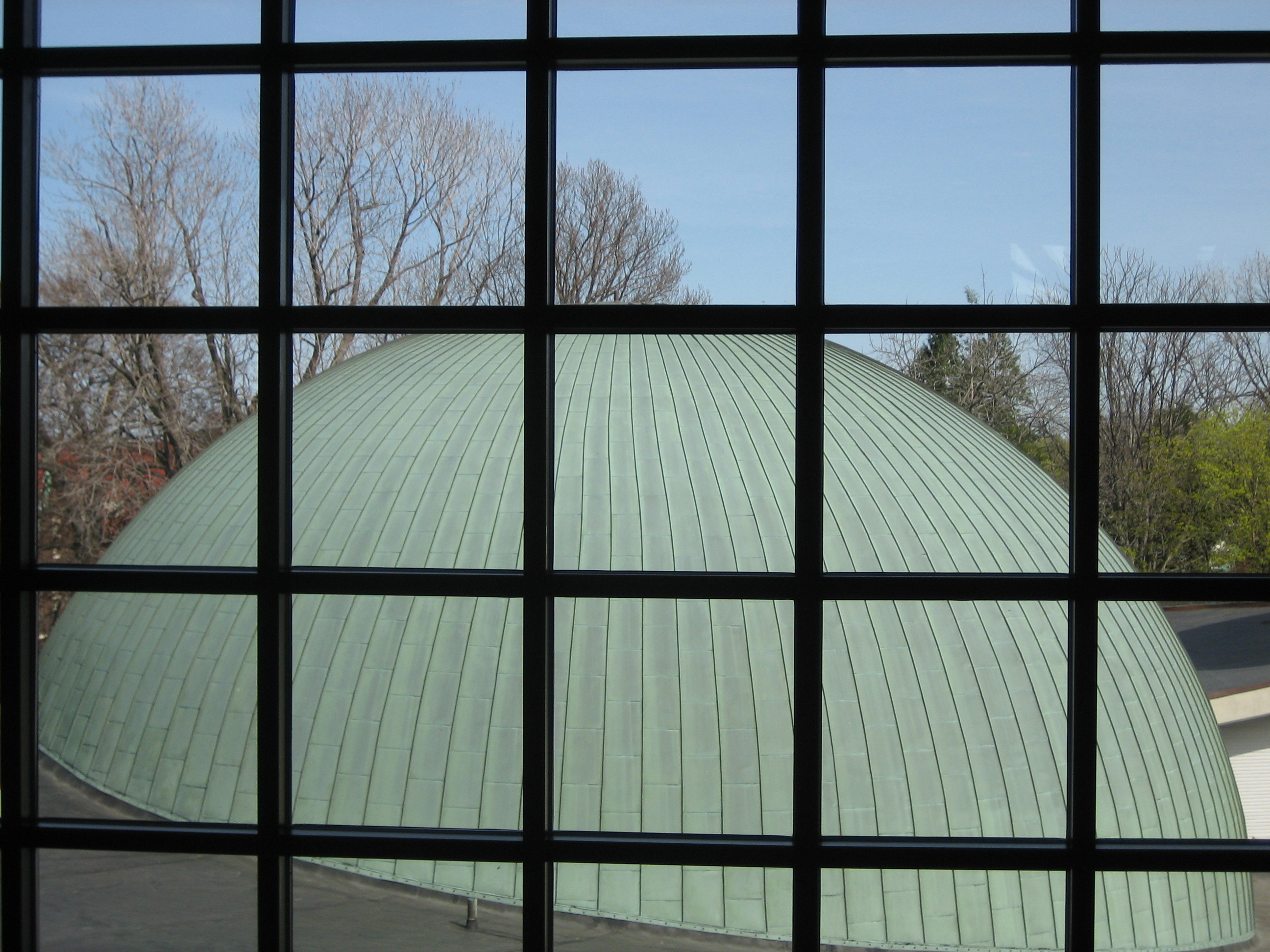
Strasenburgh Planetarium viewed from the Rochester Museum and Science Center

In 1959, the Rochester Museum Association Planning Committee announced a master plan for expansion of the museum. An architectural design by Robert Napier, then a student at the Pratt Institute in Brooklyn, NY, included a detached planetarium building at the corner of East Avenue and Goodman Street, just west of the main Museum building. The conceptual plan also included a separate auditorium and a building for industry-related exhibits. None of these was actually constructed.

In the fall of 1964 the Rochester Museum of Arts and Sciences announced that it had received a gift of "more than one million dollars" from Mr. and Mrs. Edwin G. Strasenburgh of Rochester for the purpose of building a planetarium. The building design, by Carl F. W. Kaelber Jr. of the Rochester architectural firm of Waasdorp, Northup & Kaelber, was announced on June 28, 1966. In contrast to the 1959 concept, Kaelber's design placed the Strasenburgh Planetarium on the east side of the original Museum building. The Planetarium building was said to resemble a snail shell or a spiral nebula.

Construction began with a groundbreaking ceremony on March 16, 1967. The building was dedicated on September 14, 1968.
