= Rutt/Etra Video Synthesizer =

Analog raster manipulation device

Vector Synthesis

The Rutt/Etra Video Synthesizer, also known as the Rutt/Etra Scan Processor, is an analog device that modifies a conventional video image through electromagnetic deflection of the electron beam in a CRT display. The Rutt/Etra was co-invented by Steve Rutt and Bill Etra.

Raster images

== See also ==
- Scanimate – a similar device
