= Gavin Brown (art dealer) =

British artist and art dealer

Gavin Brown is a British artist and art dealer. He is the owner of the gallery, Gavin Brown's enterprise in New York City and co-founder of non-profit gallery 356 Mission in Los Angeles. The 356 Mission art space closed in 2019, due to the lease ending.

== Early life ==
Brown grew up in Croydon in south London. His mother was a social worker; his father an architect, who abandoned the family when Brown was 11. He attended Newcastle Polytechnic – where his classmates included Matthew Higgs – and later at Chelsea College of Arts. At Anthony d’Offay Gallery in London, Brown worked as an assistant in the back room alongside Damien Hirst before moving to New York in 1988 to continue his studies at the Whitney Museum of American Art's Independent Study Program.

== Career ==
Brown began organizing exhibitions in the early 1990s – including one for 303 Gallery in 1991 as well as pop-ups in at the Hotel Chelsea, in his apartment on the Upper West Side and in a cubicle he rented in a Midtown office building – and opened his first gallery in Soho in 1994. In December 1993, he had a solo show of his own work at David Zwirner Gallery in Soho.

In 2003, Brown served on the selection committee for the first edition of Frieze Art Fair.

In the early 2000s, Brown ran a gallery in Rome called Roma Roma Roma with fellow dealers Franco Noero and Toby Webster, who have galleries in Turin, Italy, and Glasgow, Scotland, respectively.

In 2012 he took a lease in Los Angeles for 356 Mission, a gallery that is operated as an artist-run space by painter Laura Owens.

In 2014, The Guardian named him in their "Movers and makers: the most powerful people in the art world".

In 2015, Brown and Rirkrit Tiravanija opened Unclebrother, a restaurant and gallery in a former car dealership in Hancock, New York.

In July 2020, Brown announced that he would close his gallery and partner with Barbara Gladstone. In 2024, he donated a range of materials related to his former gallery to Bard College’s Center for Curatorial Studies.

== Controversy ==
Brown and painter Laura Owens have been accused of being involved with gentrification of a predominantly working-class, Hispanic neighbourhood with their non-profit gallery 356 Mission in the neighbourhood of Boyle Heights, on the east side of Los Angeles. Activists of various anti-gentrification groups have protested their galleries and exhibitions in both Los Angeles and New York City. The 356 Mission art space closed in 2019, due to the lease ending.

== Personal life ==
Since 2011, Brown has been residing in Harlem where he moved with his wife, artist Hope Atherton, and their daughter. From a previous marriage with Scottish fashion designer, Lucy Barnes, Brown has three children.

In 2005, Brown purchased a 700-square-foot weekend home in the hamlet of Lordville, New York.
