= Joan Jonas =

American visual artist (born 1936)

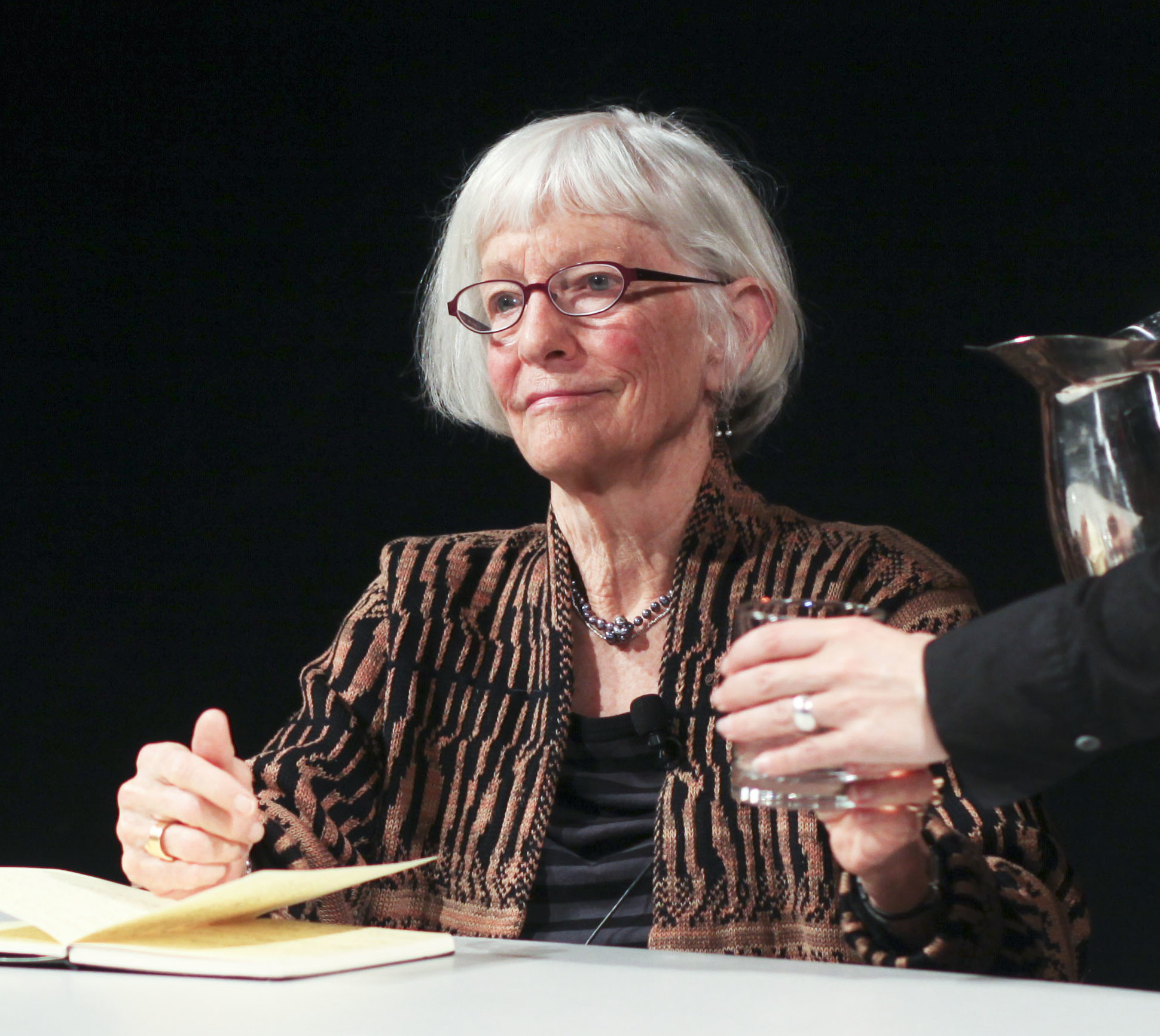
- Jonas in 2010
- Born: Joan Amerman Edwards; July 13, 1936 (age 90); New York City, US
- Known for: Video art, performance art, sculpture
- Movement: Performance art
- Awards: Maya Deren Award, 1989; Foundation for Contemporary Arts Grants to Artists Award, 1995; Anonymous Was A Woman Award, 1998; Kyoto Prize, 2018

Joan Jonas (born July 13, 1936) is an American visual artist and a pioneer of video and performance art, "a central figure in the performance art movement of the late 1960s". Jonas' projects and experiments were influential in the creation of video performance art as a medium. Her influences also extended to conceptual art, theatre, performance art and other visual media. She lives and works in New York and Nova Scotia, Canada.

== Early life and education ==
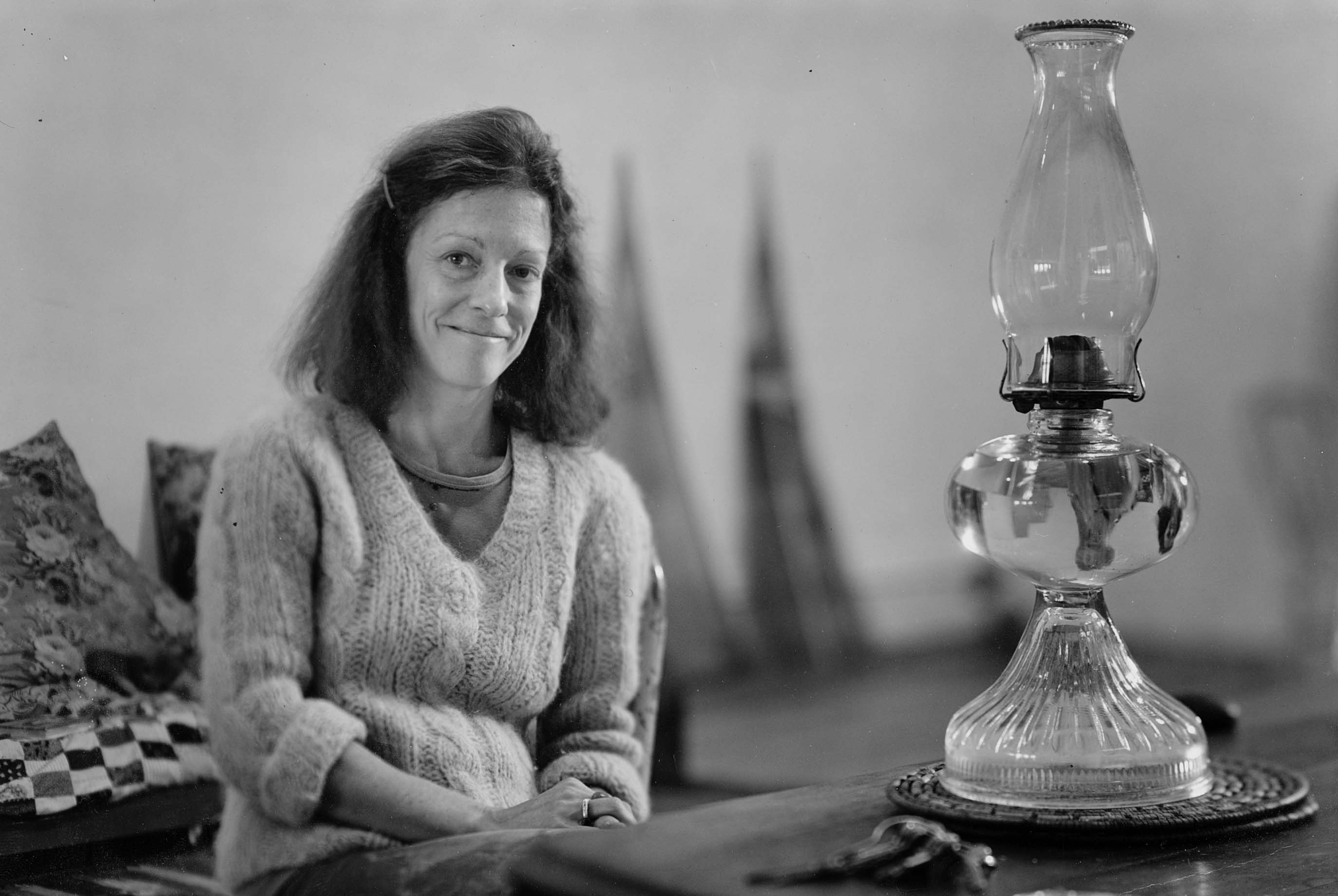
Joan Jonas in her Soho loft, 1973. Photograph by Chris Kraemer.

Jonas was born in 1936 in New York City. In 1958 she received a bachelor's degree in Art History from Mount Holyoke College in South Hadley, Massachusetts. She later studied sculpture and drawing at the School of the Museum of Fine Arts in Boston and received an MFA in Sculpture from Columbia University in 1965. Immersed in New York's downtown art scene of the 1960s, Jonas studied with the choreographer Trisha Brown for two years. Jonas also worked with choreographers Yvonne Rainer and Steve Paxton.

== Work ==
Though Jonas began her career as a sculptor, by 1968 she moved into what was then leading-edge territory: mixing performance with props and mediated images, situated outdoors in urban or rural landscapes and/or industrial environments. Between 1968 and 1971, Jonas performed Mirror Pieces, works which used mirrors as a central motif or prop. In these early performances, the mirror became a symbol of (self-)portraiture, representation, the body, and real vs. imaginary, while also sometimes adding an element of danger and a connection to the audience that was integral to the work. In Wind (1968), Jonas filmed performers stiffly passing through the field of view against a wind that lent the choreography a psychological mystique.

In 1970, Jonas went on a long trip to Japan — where she bought her first video camera and saw Noh, Bunraku and Kabuki theater — with the sculptor Richard Serra. Her video performances between 1972 and 1976 pared the cast down to one actor, the artist herself, performing in her New York loft as Organic Honey, her seminal alter-ego invented as an "electronic erotic seductress," whose doll-like visage seen reflected bits on camera explored the fragmented female image and women's shifting roles. Drawings, costumes, masks, and interactions with the recorded image were effects that optically related to a doubling of perception and meaning. In one such work, Organic Honey's Visual Telepathy (1972), Jonas scans her own fragmented image onto a video screen. In Disturbances (1973), a woman swims silently beneath another woman's reflection. Songdelay (1973), filmed with both telephoto and wide-angle lenses (which produce opposing extremes in depth of field) drew on Jonas' travels in Japan, where she saw groups of Noh performers clapping wood blocks and making angular movements. In a video interview for MoMA, Jonas described her work as androgynous; earlier works were more involved in the search for a feminine vernacular in art, she explains, and, unlike sculpture and painting, video was more open, less dominated by men.

In 1975, Jonas appeared as a performer in the movie Keep Busy, by the photographer Robert Frank and novelist-screenwriter Rudy Wurlitzer. In 1976 with The Juniper Tree, Jonas arrived at a narrative structure from diverse literary sources, such as fairy tales, mythology, poetry, and folk songs, formalizing a highly complex, nonlinear method of presentation. Using a colorful theatrical set and recorded sound, The Juniper Tree retold a Grimm Brothers tale of an archetypal evil stepmother and her family.

In the 1990s, Jonas’ My New Theater series moved away from a dependence on her physical presence. The three pieces investigated, in sequence: a Cape Breton Island dancer and his local culture; a dog jumping through a hoop while Jonas draws a landscape; and finally, using stones, costumes, memory-laden objects, and her dog, a video about the act of performing. She also created Revolted by the Thought of Known Places... (1992) and Woman in the Well (1996/2000).

In her installation/performance commissioned for Documenta 11, Lines in the Sand (2002), Jonas investigated themes of the self and the body in a performance installation based on the writer H.D.’s (Hilda Doolittle) epic poem "Helen in Egypt" (1951–55), which reworks the myth of Helen of Troy. Jonas sited many of her early performances at The Kitchen, including Funnel (1972) and the screening of Vertical Roll (1972). In The Shape, The Scent, The Feel of Things, produced by The Renaissance Society in 2004, Jonas draws on Aby Warburg's work on Hopi imagery.

Since 1970, Jonas has spent part of every summer in Cape Breton, Nova Scotia. She has lived and worked in Greece, Morocco, India, Germany, the Netherlands, Iceland, Poland, Hungary, and Ireland.

Jonas’ works were first performed in the 1960s and '70s for some of the most influential artists of her generation, including Richard Serra, Robert Smithson, Dan Graham and Laurie Anderson. While she is widely known in Europe, her groundbreaking performances are lesser known in the United States, where, as critic Douglas Crimp wrote of her work in 1983, "the rupture that is effected in modernist practices has subsequently been repressed, smoothed over." Yet, in restaging early and recent works, Jonas continues to find new layers of meanings in themes and questions of gender and identity that have fueled her art for over thirty years.

Jonas' performance inspired by the writings of German anthropologist Aby Warburg, The Shape, The Scent, The Feel of Things, was commissioned by Dia Beacon and was twice performed between 2005 and 2006. This project established an ongoing and continuing collaboration with the pianist Jason Moran.

For the season 2014/2015 in the Vienna State Opera Joan Jonas designed a large-scale picture (176 sqm) as part of the exhibition series Safety Curtain, conceived by museum in progress.

Jonas was also featured as a choreographer for Robert Ashley's Opera titled Celestial Excursions in 2003.

=== Teaching ===
From 1993, the New York-based Jonas spent part of each year in Los Angeles, teaching a course in New Genres at the UCLA School of the Arts. In 1994, she was made a full professor at the State Academy of Fine Arts Stuttgart, Germany. Since 1998, she has been a professor of visual arts at the Massachusetts Institute of Technology (MIT), where she is currently professor emerita in the Art, Culture, and Technology program within MIT's School of Architecture and Planning.

== Exhibitions and performances ==
=== Performances ===
Jonas has performed her works at venues including:

- Walker Art Center, Minneapolis (1974)
- The Kitchen, New York (1975)
- San Francisco Museum of Art (1976)
- Kunstmuseum Bern (2004)
- The Shape, the Scent, the Feel of Things, Dia:Beacon (2006)
- Berkeley Art Museum and Pacific Film Archive (2008)
- PERFORMA 13, (2013)
- Art Night (2016)
- Oberlin College

=== Solo exhibitions ===
Jonas has had a number of solo exhibitions, including:

- Stedelijk Museum (1994)
- Rosamund Felsen Gallery, Los Angeles (2003)
- Pat Hearn Gallery, New York City (2003)
- Joan Jonas: Five Works, Queens Museum of Art (2003)
- Joan Jonas. Light Time Tales, HangarBicocca, Milan (2014)
- Safety Curtain., Vienna State Opera, Vienna (2014/15)
- what is found in the windowless house is true, Gavin Brown's Enterprise, NY (2017)
- Joan Jonas: Ice Drawing, Museum of Fine Arts, Boston (2017-2018)
- Joan Jonas, Tate Modern (2018)
- Moving Off the Land II, at Ocean Space, Venice (2019)
- Joan Jonas, Cinco Décadas, at Pinacoteca de São Paulo, (Brazil, 2020) curator Berta Sichel
- Joan Jonas: Animal, Vegetable, Mineral, at the Drawing Center, New York (2024)

=== Group exhibitions ===
Jonas has participated in many international group exhibitions, including:

- Documenta, Kassel, Germany (Jonas has participated six times since 1972).
- Point of View: A Contemporary Anthology of the Moving Image, New Museum(2004)
- Wack! Art and the Feminist Revolution, Museum of Contemporary Art, Los Angeles (2007)

In 2009, she exhibited for the first (and only other) time at the Venice Biennale.

In 2015, Jonas represented the United States of America at the Venice Biennale. She was the sixth female artist to represent the United States at Venice since 1990.

In 2019 Jonas work was presented at the Animalesque group show at Bildmuseet, Umeå University, Sweden.

== Other activities ==
In 2023, Jonas served on the jury that chose Sarah Lucas as first winner of the New Museum’s $400,000 Hostetler/Wrigley Sculpture Award.

== Recognition ==
Jonas has been awarded fellowships and grants for choreography, video, and visual arts from the National Endowment for the Arts; Rockefeller Foundation; Contemporary Art Television (CAT) Fund; Television Laboratory at WNET/13, New York; Artists' Television Workshop at WXXI-TV, Rochester, New York; and Deutscher Akademischer Austausch Dienst (DAAD). Jonas has received the Hyogo Prefecture Museum of Modern Art Prize at the Tokyo International Video Art Festival, the Polaroid Award for Video, and the American Film Institute Maya Deren Award for Video.

In 2009, Jonas was awarded a Lifetime Achievement Award from the Solomon R. Guggenheim Museum.

In 2012, Jonas was honored on the occasion of the Kitchen Spring Gala Benefit.

Jonas was named Whitechapel Gallery Art Icon 2016. In 2018, Jonas won the Kyoto Prize for Art.

Jonas has received awards from Anonymous Was A Woman (1998); the Rockefeller Foundation (1990); American Film Institute's Maya Deren Award for Video (1989); Guggenheim Foundation (1976); and the National Endowment for the Arts (1974).

In 2023 Jonas was elected to the Royal Academy of Arts in London, as an Honorary Royal Academician (HonRA).

== Art market ==
Joan Jonas is represented in New York City by Gladstone Gallery, after previously being represented by Gavin Brown's enterprise. Jonas is represented in Los Angeles by Rosamund Felsen Gallery.

In addition to working on her art, Jonas has been serving on the advisory board of the Hauser & Wirth Institute since 2018.

== Public collections ==
Jonas' work can be found in a number of public institutions, including:

- Museum of Modern Art, New York
- Solomon R. Guggenheim Museum, New York
- Tate Modern, London

== Archival collections ==
Archival materials from the Jonas' personal archives have been made available in the Joan Jonas Knowledge Base, an open source resource from the Artists Archive Initiative at New York University.
