= Steina and Woody Vasulka =

Collaborative video artist team

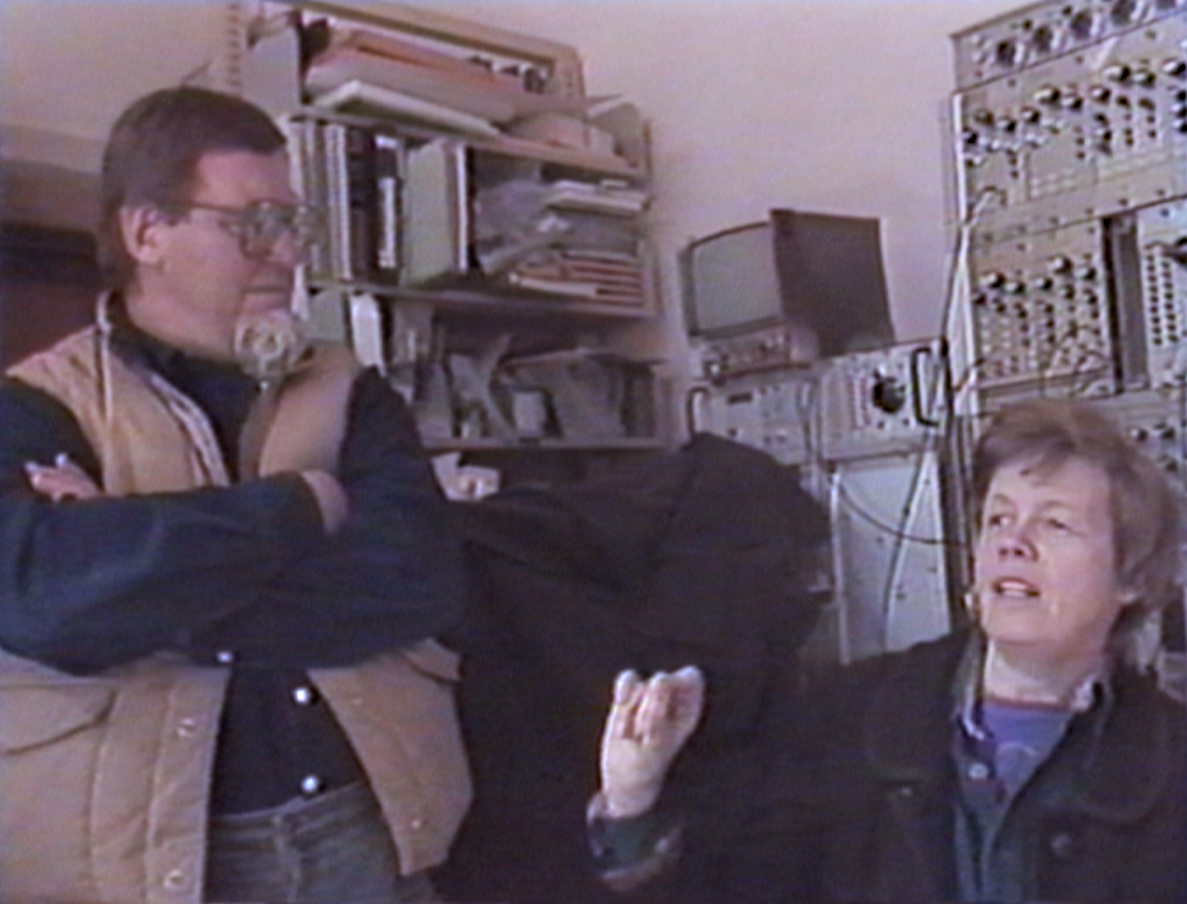
Woody Vasulka (left) Steina Vasulka (right)

Steina Vasulka (born Steinunn Briem Bjarnadottir in 1940) and Woody Vasulka (born Bohuslav Vašulka on 20 January 1937 – 20 December 2019) are early pioneers of video art, and have been producing work since the early 1960s. The couple met in the early 1960s and moved to New York City in 1965, where they began showing video art at the Whitney Museum and founded The Kitchen in 1971. Steina and Woody both became Guggenheim fellows: Steina in 1976, and Woody in 1979.

The VASULKAs, as they are sometimes called, were experimenting since the early 1960s with images, video tapes, computer graphics, and Digital Video Effecter (DVE), a technique that was important for television programmes.

== Life and education ==
=== Steina ===
Steina Vasulka was born in Reykjavík, Iceland, and trained as a classical musician and violinist, and was a member of the Iceland Symphony Orchestra. Steina received a scholarship at the Prague Conservatory in 1959.

=== Woody ===
Bohuslav "Woody" Vasulka (born Bohuslav Vašulka (20 January 1937, – 20 December 2019, Santa Fe, USA) was born in Brno, now in the Czech Republic, and trained as an engineer before studying television and film production at the Academy of Performing Arts in Prague. While pursuing his studies in the fifties, Woody Vasulka wrote poetry and produced short films.

Bohuslav Vasulka studied engineering at the Industrial Engineering School of Brno between 1952 and 1956. Later, he discovered the potential that technology could bring to art and decided to move to Prague in 1960 and study television and film production at the Prague Academy for Performing Arts at the Faculty of Film and Television throughout the period from 1960 to 1965. His educational background and engineering skills would later stimulate him to work in the realm of media art.

=== Life together ===
In the early 1960s, Woody and Steina met in Prague, where Woody introduced video to Steina. At that time she was studying languages and violin playing at the conservatory in Prague, where she was granted a scholarship. They started working together and married in 1964.

A year after they settled in New York, United States. The couple was in love with "America's boast of freedom, love of technology and promotion of independence". By that time, Woody Vasulka had filmed several documentaries and after relocating worked as an editor of industrial film projects at Harvey Lloyd Productions.

== New York ==
For the first few years following their relocation to in New York, the Vasulkas were not involved with the local art scene; Steina continued to practice as a violinist and Woody began making independent documentaries and edited industrial films at Harvey Lloyd Productions. In 1967, at the request of architects Woods and Ramirez, Woody collaborated on developing films designed for a multi-screen environment to be shown in the American Pavilion at Expo 67 in Montreal. In 1968, Woody conducted his first experiments with images made with electronics and put aside the cinematographic form in favor of video. Steina was experimenting with video at the same time as Woody, with equipment that the couple had borrowed from Lloyd. Over time, the Vasulkas became more closely involved with the artistic communities around them and the emerging fascination with video and new-media, and grew more dedicated to their developing video art practice until they made it their shared full-time occupation.

On December 31, 1969, and January 1, 1970, Woody Valsulka video recorded Jimi Hendrix performing with Band of Gypsys at the Fillmore East in NYC. The recordings are included on a DVD included in a CD release of the concerts. (Source: Live at the Fillmore DVD, released 1999, released again 2012)

=== The Kitchen ===
In 1971, the Vasulkas founded The Kitchen, a multi-use media theater located in the kitchen of the Mercer Arts Center in Grand Central Hotel, Greenwich Village, in the interest of cultivating new-media art in an inclusive, comprehensive, and un-administrative context. The Kitchen's own history describes it as a space that supported experimental work across video, music, performance, and media art.Under the direction of Dimitri Devyatkin, and with help from Andy Mannik, Sia and Michael Tschudin, Rhys Chatham, and Shridhar Bapat, the space received a grant from the New York State Council on the Arts and expanded its programming, which was foregrounded by video and electronic media performance and would come to include new music programming under the direction of Rhys Chatham. The Kitchen would relocate following the collapse of the Mercer Arts Centre, but maintain its mission.

The Kitchen was valuable space for several music, performance, and media artists in New York who at the time did not feel welcome in commercial galleries or the mainstream art-world. The Vasulkas' programming for The Kitchen provided the space to a number video artists who would become prominent, including Joan Jonas, Nancy Holt, Vito Acconci, Mary Lucier, Dara Birnbaum, Bill Viola, and Gary Hill.

The Kitchen is one of New York City's oldest nonprofit spaces, where multidisciplinary artists working in the fields of dance, music, performance, and media art can participate and exhibit their art pieces. There are also literary events, artists' talks, and lecture series being regularly held.

== Work ==
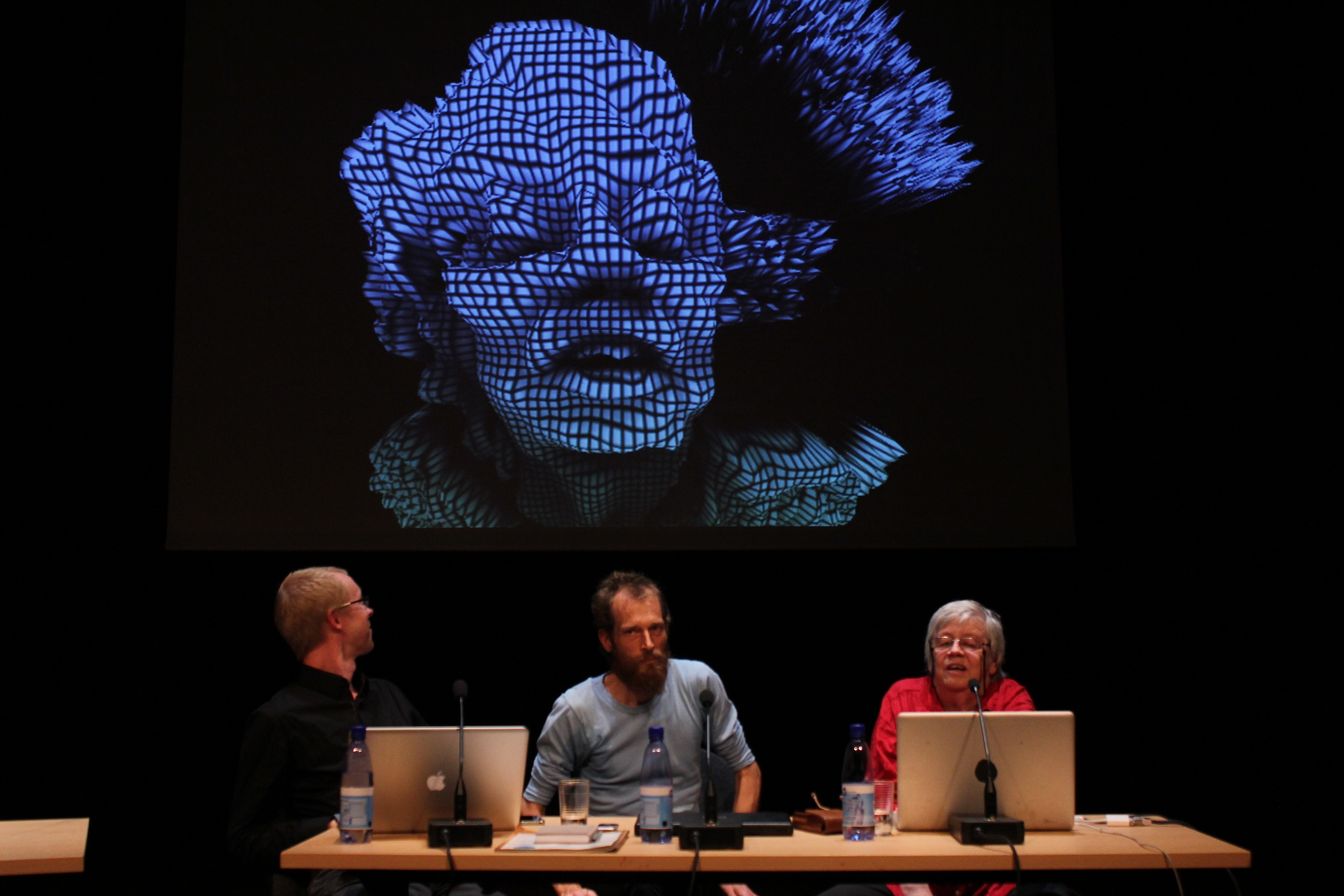
Steina Vasulka speaking about her work in 2011

The work that the Vasulkas presented at The Kitchen's original Greenwich Village location, which amounted to a handful of performances and showings each month, included a range of live documentary and experimental videos, live video performances, live video processing, media installations, and “experiments in perception.”

The Vasulkas' work at this time was colored by the artists' interest in negotiating terms like "space" in the context of video and what Yvonne Spielman calls video's "image object." The Vasulkas' wide exploration of video in this ontological regard led to apparent contrast, such as that between the documentary-style Participation series involving footage of real-life performances (occurring in the space in front of and around the video camera), and works like Caligrams, in which the Vasulkas use hardware devices such as scan processors, video sequencers, and multikeyers to "play" or perform with video like a musical instrument, and in a different kind of space.

In 1974, the Vasulkas moved to Buffalo, New York to pursue a faculty position at the University at Buffalo's Department of Media Study, though they would maintain involvement with The Kitchen and its programming. Though Steina and Woody had worked outside their duo before, their practices diverged to a greater extent following this relocation. Woody's practice became more focused on digital image manipulation and the employment of tools like the Rutt/Etra Video Synthesizer (Bill Etra, a co-creator of this device, showed frequently at The Kitchen during the Vasulkas' tenure). Steina's practice centered around environmental, mechanical, and physical relationships between body, video, and camera, beginning with a late-1970s series of moving-camera environments titled All Vision and Machine Vision which were shown, in part, at The Kitchen.

University at Buffalo materials identify Woody Vasulka as an associate professor of video from 1973 to 1979 and Steina Vasulka as an adjunct professor of video from 1977 to 1979. The same source states that the Vasulkas were among the Media Study faculty whose works were presented in the MindFrames: Media Study at Buffalo 1973–1990 exhibition.

During their time in Buffalo, the Vasulkas taught in the Center for Media Study at SUNY Buffalo alongside experimental and structural filmmakers including Paul Sharits, Hollis Frampton, and Tony Conrad. The MIT List Visual Arts Center publication connects this context to Steina's exploration of an "intelligent, yet not human vision" through video, camera movement, and electronic image-making.

The Vasulkas have collaborated with Harald Bode (posthumously).

== Vasulka Chamber ==
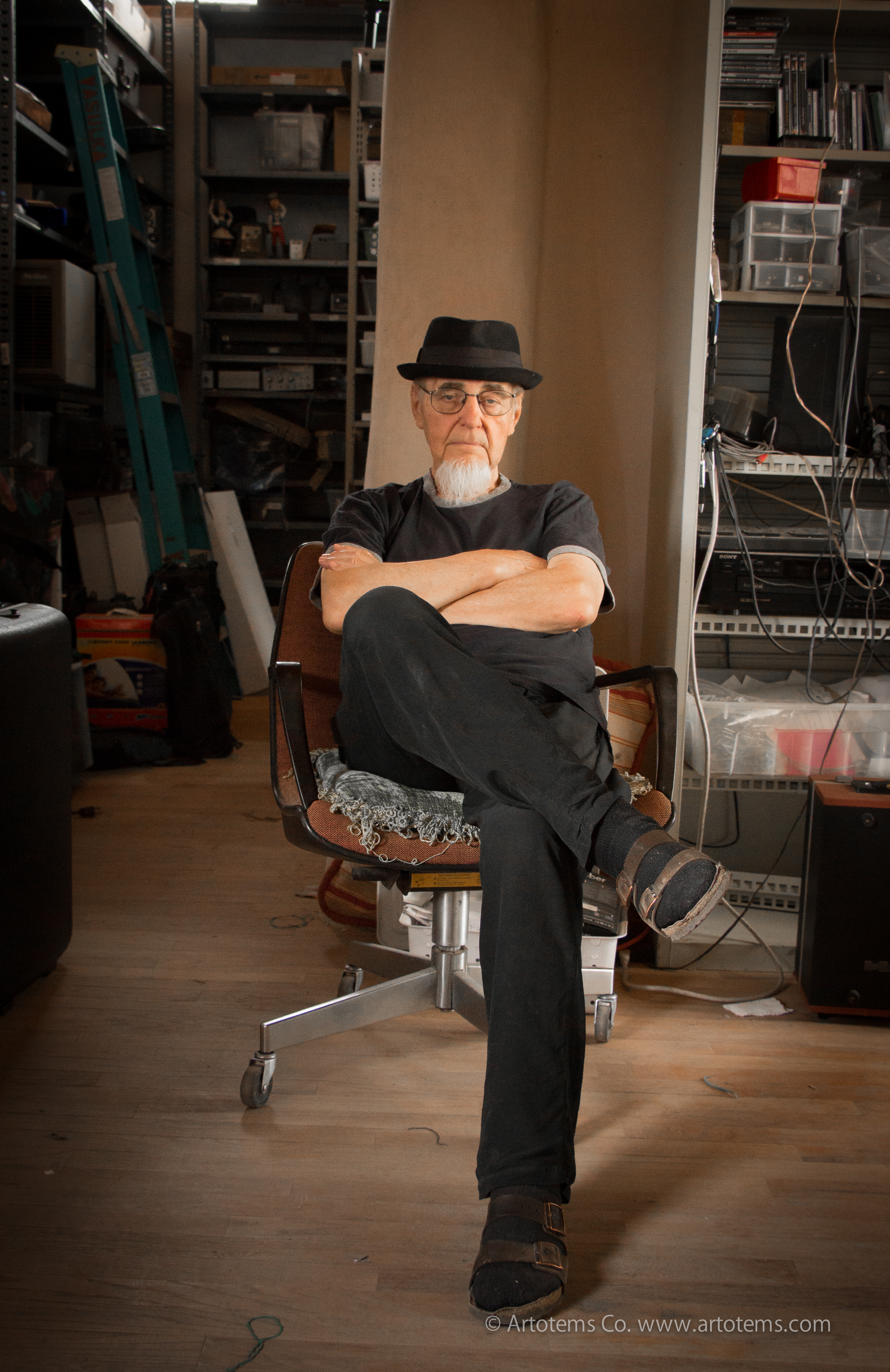
Woody Vasulka in 2013

In 2014, the National Gallery of Iceland opened the Vasulka Chamber, a collaboration between the museum and the artist couple. They donated a substantial amount of their digital archive to the museum, and the Chamber aims to preserve the legacy and collection of the artists.

== Vasulka Archive ==
In 2016, the Vašulka Kitchen Brno (VKB) was established in Brno in the Czech Republic, for research, artistic experiment, and informal education in the field of new media art. It consists of the archive of Woody and Steina Vašulkas’ work and a permanent exhibition of their selected works.

== Gallery representation ==
The Vasulkas are represented by commercial art gallery BERG Contemporary.

== Selected works ==
Complete and existing videotapes by Steina and Woody Vasulka include:

1969–71

- Participation, 60 min., b/w

1970

- Adagio, 10 min., color
- Calligrams, 12 min., b/w
- Decay #1, 7 min., color
- Decay #2, 7 min., b/w
- Don Cherry, 12 min., b/w (in collaboration with Elaine Milosh)
- Evolution, 16 min
- Interface, 3:30 min., b/w
- Jackie Curtis' First Television Special, 45 min., b/w
- Sexmachine, 6 min., b/w
- Sketches, 27 min., b/w
- Tissues, 6min., b/w

1970-78

- Violin Power, video, 10:04 min., b/w, sound (by Steina Vasulka)

1971

- Black Sunrise, 21 min., color
- Contrapoint, 3 min., b/w
- Discs, 6 min., b/w
- Elements, 9 min., color
- Keysnow, 12 min., color
- Shapes, 13 min., b/w
- Swan Lake, 7 min., b/w

1972

- Distant Activities, 6 min., color
- Soundprints, endless loops, color
- Spaces 1, 15 min., b/w
- Spaces 2, 15 min., b/w

1973

- Golden Voyage, 28 min., color
- Home, 16 min., color
- Vocabulary, 5 min., color

1974

- 1-2-3-4, 8 min., color
- Heraldic View, 5 min., color
- Noisefields, 13 min., color
- Solo For 3, 5 min., color
- Soundgated Images, 10 min., color
- Soundsize, 5 min., color
- Telc, 5 min., color

1979

- Six Programs for Television: Matrix, Vocabulary, Transformations, Object, Steina, Digital Images, 174 min., total (29 min. each), color

1981

- In Search of the Castle, 12 min., color
- Progeny, 19 min., color (in collaboration with Bradford Smith)

1983

- The West, color

1984

- Pariah, color

1989

- In the Land of the Elevator Girls, color

=== Solo works (Woody) ===
- Vocabulary (fragment), 1974, video, 4'29'', LIMA collection.
- Reminiscence (2012), 1974, video, 4'52''.
- Reminiscence, 1974, video, 4'52''.
- The Matter, 1974, video, 4'02''.
- C-Trend, 1974, video, 8'29''.
- Electromagnetic Objects, 1975 - 2006, video 33'58''.
- Artifacts/Keysnow, 1980, video, 32'19''.
- Artifacts, 1980, video, 22'51''.
- The commission, 1983, video, 39'16''.
- The commission, 1983, video, 45'00''.
- Art of Memory, 1987, video, 36'37''.

=== Solo exhibitions (Woody) ===
- 1977 — Electronic Image in Film, Anthology Film Archive, New York (United States).
- 1983 — The commission, Rising Sun Media Center, Santa Fe (United States).
- 1998 — Woody VASULKA, The Brotherhood: A Series of Six Interactive Media Constructions, NTT InterCommunication Center, Tokyo (Japan).
- 1996 — A Retrospective Exhibition of Woody Vasulka's work, San Francisco Museum of Modern Art.
- 1994 — Federal Exhibition Hall, Bonn (Germany).
- 1994 — Lace Gallery, Los Angeles (United States).
- 1992 — Woody Vasulka is preparing an exhibition dedicated to the pioneers of electronic art for the Ars Electronica festival in Linz (Eigenwelt der Apparatewelt: Pioneers of Electronic Art).
- 1990 — Table 2: Automata (first in a series of six The Brotherhood installations), San Francisco (United States).
- 1975 — The first group exhibition of the Vasulkas at the Albright-Knox Gallery in Buffalo (United States).
