= Electronic superhighway =

Electronic superhighway may refer to:

- Electronic Superhighway: Continental U.S., Alaska, Hawaii, a video art installation by Nam June Paik
- Information superhighway, a similar phrase used in the late-20th century
