= My Father (Shigeko Kubota) =

My Father (14:26) is a black and white video recorded on a Sony Portapak produced between 1973 and 1975 by the Japanese Fluxus video artist, sculptor, and performance artist Shigeko Kubota.

== Description ==
My Father begins with text that explains that Kubota's father died of cancer on the day she had bought a plane ticket from New York City to see him in Japan. That day, she called a friend, who suggested that she film herself while mourning. Images of Kubota's father watching television, one of his favorite pastimes, are dispersed in the video, as are images of Kubota grieving alone in her house. Kubota explains during the video that she took the footage of her father two years earlier in Japan when she visited him after he had first been diagnosed with cancer.

The video emphasizes that television compliments memory and that TV monitors are sites of memory and of emotionality, a theme that is suggested in Kubota's video eulogies to Nam June Paik in the 1990s and 2000s, Korean Grave, and Winter in Miami. Also, Kubota's Duchampiana series eulogizes Marcel Duchamp, while exploring the presence of the artist in recorded images of him. My Father is an elegy, and a video diary, reflecting on the influence of the technology, and more specifically the television set, on her personal memory of her father, and her emotions of simultaneously grieving and seeing him on a television monitor. Ann-Sargent Wooster argues that My Father explores the ironic duality of the image of a person appearing on a TV screen after they have died– in a sense, bringing the dead to life. In the video, Kubota touches the screen of a monitor with her father's image as if reaching out to him.

My Father also has been interpreted as performative. As Andrew Parker describes the term, "performativity has enable a powerful appreciation of the ways that identities are constructed iteratively through complex citational processes. My Father has been linked to performativity because of its disruption of the viewer's sense of space and time as Kubota's mourning appears to take place as the figure of her father lingers on the television, both present and absent, as a ghost incarnated.

== Collections ==
- San Francisco Museum of Modern Art
- Museum of Modern Art

== Additional sources ==
- Goldberg, RoseLee. 1998. Performance: live art since 1960. New York: Harry N. Abrams Publishers.
- O'Dell, Kelly, 1997. Fluxus Feminus, MIT Press (TDR) Vol. 41. No. 1, 43-60.
- Wark, Jayne. 2006. Radical gestures: feminism and performance art in North America. Montreal: McGill-Queen's University Press.
- Warr, Tracey, and Amelia Jones. 2000. The artist's body. London: Phaidon.
- Wooster, Ann-Sargent, “Shigeko Kubota: I Travel Alone,” High Performance, Winter 1991, 28.
- Yoshimoto, Midori."Self-exploration in multimedia : the experiments of Shigeko Kubota," in Into performance: Japanese women artists in New York. New Brunswick, N.J., Rutgers University Press. 2005.
