= Deck the Halls with Wacky Walls =

1983 American animated Christmas special

- Genre: Animated TV special
- Written by: Mark Evanier
- Directed by: Candy Kugel; Al Kouzel; Vincent Cafarelli
- Voices of: Daws Butler; Peter Cullen; Tress MacNeille; Marvin Kaplan; Howard Morris; Frank Welker; Scott Menville
- Composers: Elliot Lawrence; Amy Lawrence
- Country of origin: United States
- Original language: English

Production
- Producer: Buzz Potamkin
- Running time: 30 minutes
- Production company: NBC Productions in association with Buzzco Associates

Original release
- Network: NBC
- Release: December 11, 1983

Deck the Halls with Wacky Walls is an American television Christmas special that aired on NBC on December 11, 1983. The special is inspired by the Wacky WallWalker toys that were imported from Japan and merchandised by Ken Hakuta in 1982. The toys are small plastic octopus-like figures molded out of a sticky elastomer; when thrown against a wall, the figures slowly "walk" down as the appendages briefly adhere to the surface. More than 200 million of the toys were sold in the early 1980s. Hakuta set up the TV deal with NBC, and the young boy in the special bore a "distinct resemblance to Mr. Hakuta's 4-year-old son, Kenzo."

In the special, the WallWalkers are extraterrestrial octopoids from the planet Kling-Kling, sent to Earth to discover the true meaning of Christmas. The team of aliens — Wacky, Big Blue, Springette, Stickum, Crazy Legs and Bouncing Baby Boo — disguise themselves as Santa Claus, but they're discovered by a spoiled human boy, Darryl, who needs a lesson in the Yuletide spirit. Darryl threatens to inform the U.S. Air Force about the aliens, unless they help him earn money to buy an expensive toy car. At an orphanage, Crazy Legs discovers the kindness of strangers, and Darryl and the WallWalkers listen to the story of the Three Wise Men and the Star of Bethlehem. Learning his lesson, Darryl donates his presents to the orphanage.

The special was not well-received, and was in the bottom five of the Nielsen TV ratings for the week.

== Cast ==
- Daws Butler: Wacky
- Peter Cullen: Big Blue
- Tress MacNeille: Springette
- Marvin Kaplan: Stickum
- Howard Morris: Crazy Legs
- Frank Welker: Bouncing Baby Boo, Darryl's Dad, Kenzo, Alien Astronomer
- Scott Menville: Darryl
- Cheri Steinkellner: Darryl's Mom
- Bill Scott: King Kling-Kling
- Sharman Di Vono: Additional voices

== Reception ==
Suzanne Barnes of The Cedar Rapids Gazette observed, "I personally don't believe that the whole purpose of Deck the Halls with Wacky Walls was to illustrate the true meaning of Christmas. I believe it was simply a 30-minute commercial for Wacky Wallwalkers."
