= Chi-Tien Lui =

Conservator-restorer

Chi-Tien lui
- Born: 1941 (age 84–85); Chongqing
- Occupations: Art conservator and engineer
- Known for: Preservation and restoration of video art

Chi-Tien Lui (born 1941 in Chongqing, China) is an art conservator, technician, and electrical engineer who specializes in the preservation and restoration of video and electronic art. Known for his long collaboration with artist Nam June Paik, Lui has worked with institutions like the Museum of Modern Art, Whitney Museum of American Art, San Francisco Museum of Modern Art, The Guggenheim, and the Tate Modern.

== Life and work ==
Lui was born in Chongqing, China, in 1941. As a teenager, his family moved to Taiwan, where he took classes in electrical engineering and television repair. While working as an electrician for the Taiwanese merchant marine in 1960, he “jumped ship” in Baltimore, Maryland and settled in New York City. In 1968, Lui opened CTL Electronics, a video camera equipment shop in Tribeca which became a haven for artists working with video, including Andy Warhol.

When the Port Authority condemned Radio Row to begin building the World Trade Center in 1966, Lui procured many electronics stores former inventories at low prices.

Lui met Nam June Paik in 1969, when the artist came into his shop for a camera repair, and the two became friends. Paik would visit him every weekend. Lui took Paik to Palladium nightclub in the early 1970s where Paik was inspired to make video walls.

French-American artist Raphaele Shirley started working in partnership with Lui in 2005, helping to preserve Paik’s collections in major museums, and publishing documentation on CRT conservation and maintenance.

After Paik’s death in 2006, and the cessation of CRT production in the 2000s, Lui became the primary conservator of Paik’s works held in major museums, especially because of Lui’s personal knowledge of the artist’s work and wishes.

In 2013, after two years of work by Lui and others, Paik’s “Untitled”, a player piano with CRTs and video cameras attached, was restored and put on display at MoMA.

Lui taught media conservation at the Smithsonian in 2016.
