= TV Buddha =

Video sculpture by Nam June Paik

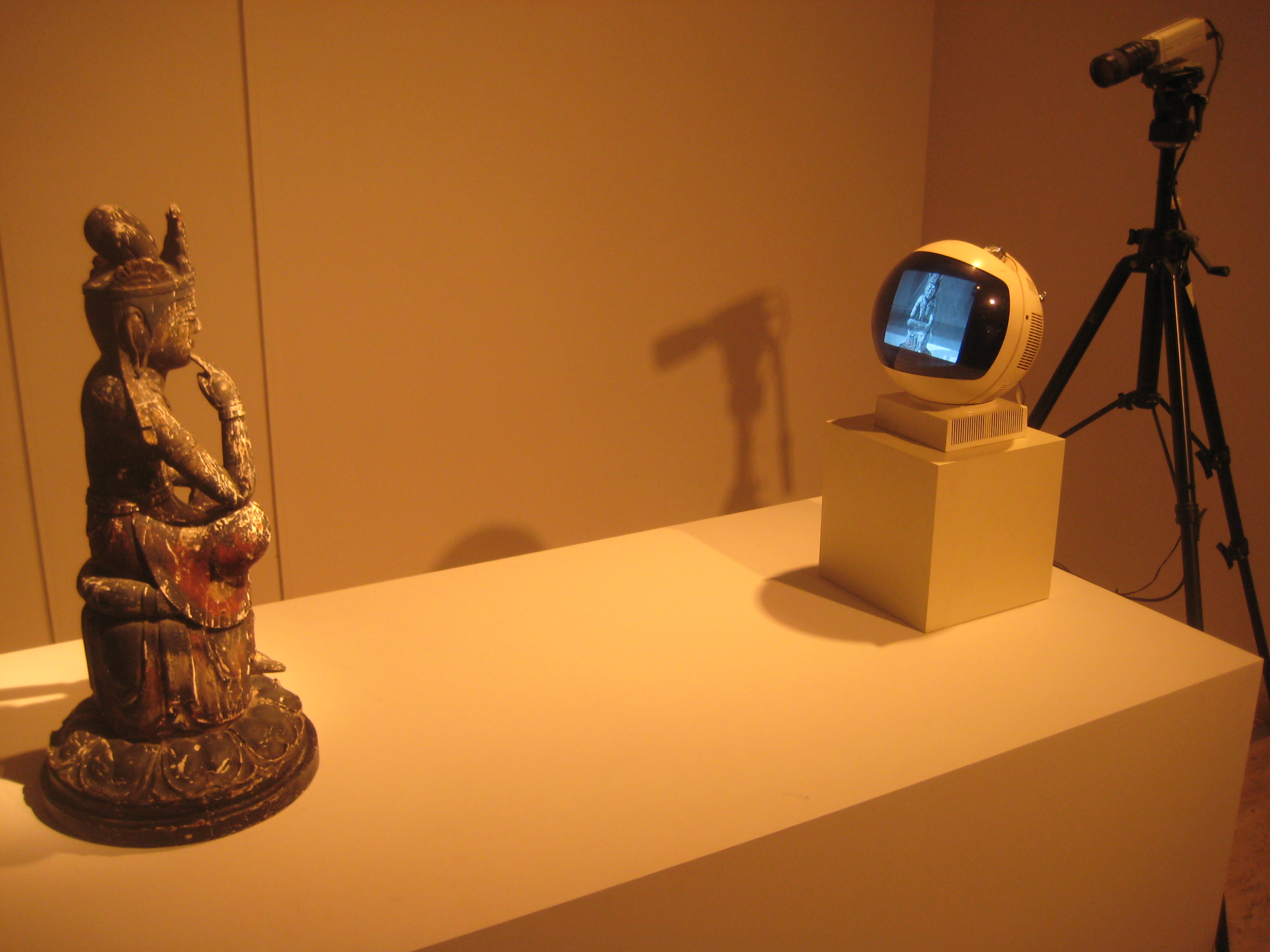
A TV Buddha sculpture

TV Buddha is a video sculpture by Nam June Paik first produced in 1974, but exists in multiple versions. In the work, a Buddha statue watches an image of itself on a TV screen. The screen's image is produced by a live video camera trained on the Buddha statue.

The work was initially produced to fill a gap in a 1974 exhibition at gallery Bonino, New York. Paik had purchased an 18th-century Buddha statue on Canal street in New York City.

== Collections ==
The work was first purchased for a museum collection in 1977 by the Stedelijk Museum Amsterdam. Paik produced successive versions of the work. A 1976 version of the work is in the collection of the Art Gallery of New South Wales, Australia. A 2004 version is held by the Fogg museum at Harvard University.

The numerous renditions of TV Buddha illustrate the work's formal simplicity and reproducibility, as the juxtaposition of Western technology and East Asian cultural references reflect patterns of cultural exchange in a global context. Among these versions, the 1976 installation is often noted for its significance, as the earliest adaptation located in a Western setting, best capturing Paik’s intentions to present the Zen Buddhism to a Western audience.

== Paik's background ==
Having been born into a Buddhist family in 1932, Paik had a fraught relationship with Buddhism, always believing the religion was backwards and fatalistic. This critical perspective only intensified with the Japanese occupation, as Paik saw how Buddhists could be corrupted by political ideology. Growing in Japanese-occupied Korea, Paik was forbidden from speaking his own language, with Japanese Zen monks playing a leading role in war propaganda. This cold-eyed awareness allowed Paik to bring down Buddha to Earth, as if Buddhism was to have any relevance of electronic superhighway, it would not be able to float within a glorified detached realm. Thus, to Paik, Buddha would have to “engage the screen, the video camera and the rapid flow of information and image – the material realities of the day”.

Not only this, the Korean War forced Paik's family to flee to Hong Kong and eventually to Tokyo in 1956, where he would graduate with a degree in aesthetics at the University of Tokyo. His continued aesthetic studies at West Germany was the focal point of his career, as meeting American avant-garde composer John Cage and his inventive compositions and unorthodox ideas influenced Paik's entry into unique video and installation art.

== Visual description and meaning ==
This 1976 version, like all other renditions, is an installation art with a television monitor, video camera, painted wooden Buddha, tripod, and plinth. The Buddha's dimensions are 75cm x 36cm x 36cm whilst the TV monitor is relatively smaller at 32cm x 32cm x 32cm. The Buddha statue is an old wooden Maitreya (Buddha of the future) from the collection of Australian philanthropist John Kaldor. In essence, as the Buddha stares into the spherical TV screen, the camera records this, looping it back to the monitor in real time as if the Buddha watches a mirror.

Other key features exemplify the meaning behind the piece. Paik rewires the television so that a single white line bisects a dark screen, resulting in a non-static image as the light from the cathode ray tubes are constantly in motion. Here, Paik’s revolution was to break the sanctity of the screen as the screen represents one-way communication of the broadcast. As Paik believed television is a dictatorial medium where we simply sit and watch under its authority, he tried to establish what a democracy means; an equal platform for all. Like how every child who discovers the magic of dragging a magnet across a TV screen and thus alters a seemingly immovable force, Paik devotes his work towards breaking the control of imprisoning technology. The mound on which the Buddha rests on remains as another important factor of TV Buddha, as it is very similar to a stupa, which along with the Buddha itself, is one of the most important visual forms in Buddhism. As a grave mound, the stupa symbolizes the complete release from seemingly endless round of births and deaths, because when Buddha, a fully enlightened being dies, he will never be born again. This reaching of an ultimate and transcendent state ties back to the importance of stillness, as the Buddha is liberated from technological manipulation through continuous contemplation of oneself. This feature extends further, as Paik Nam June’s foundation states the appearance of the audience when leaning towards the screen to watch what the Buddha sees as the most prominent aspect of the installation art. By looking at their own appearance, the audience gets a glimpse of their digital existence. This mirrored reflection represents humanity’s complete immersion with the digital world, as an individual’s online version has become integral to one’s identity.

== Scholarship ==
Critics realize Paik’s influence on the artistic community through his work with video media, as they credit Paik with recognizing TV’s pervasiveness in which it makes it almost invisible; “he sought to create alternatives to TV’s capacity to lull, to entertain and to make passive consumers of its audience”. By challenging television’s power, Paik transformed video image into a way of redefining restrictions of sculpture and installation art. Especially as the founder of the term electronic superhighway, Paik's recognition of corrosive possibilities of technology on our sense of self, community, and faith inspired resistance to mass media as unidirectional, hoping citizens of the digital age to take back some control.

Even regarding Buddhism, Paik is praised, especially in relation to one of the religion’s core questions on how to face the suffering of the world. Critics describe Paik as living with that question every moment, as experimentation was his art; his relentless, optimistic quest to expand the limits and definition of communication were his answer to suffering. Particularly by forcing Buddha to be trapped in a closed-circuit loop of his own reflection on a TV screen, Paik questions modern vanity and society’s self-absorption driven by mass culture and technology, encouraging everyone to find more individuality in this robotic reality.
