= Electronic Superhighway: Continental U.S., Alaska, Hawaii =

Art installation by Nam June Paik

- Video clip of the artwork in November 2023
- Artist: Nam June Paik
- Year: 1995
- Type: video art
- Dimensions: 4.6 m × 1.2 m × 12 m (15 ft × 4 ft × 40 ft)
- Location: Smithsonian American Art Museum; Washington, D.C.; 38.897874°N 77.022332°W
- Owner: Smithsonian Institution

Electronic Superhighway: Continental U.S., Alaska, Hawaii, commonly referred to as Electronic Superhighway, is an art installation created by Nam June Paik in 1995. Since 2006, the work has been on display in the Smithsonian American Art Museum (SAAM) in Washington, D.C. The large video artwork is composed of over 300 television sets, neon tubing, and 50 DVD players, which form a map of the United States. The map contains video clips that Paik associated with each state. Some of the states display images that are commonly associated with them, while others play video clips of people and scenes that are more thought-provoking.

The SAAM was gifted the work by Paik in 2002, seven years before the museum was given his archive, but Electronic Superhighway was not put on display until 2006. While the museum was under renovations, it was reassembled and later displayed for the first time, shortly after Paik's death. It has become one of the most popular pieces in the museum's contemporary art section. There was an exhibition of his work at the SAAM in 2012, which included Electronic Superhighway and items from his archive. The museum underwent another renovation in the 2020s, with the work not available to view from 2021 to 2023. It is among one of many works on display in the contemporary and post-1945 modern art sections that was created by people of color.

== Artist ==
Nam June Paik (1932–2006) was an artist born in South Korea who migrated to the United States in the 1960s, around the same time he began creating Fluxus works. In 1963, Paik was the first artist to create works using distorted images on a television. Two years later, he became the first artist to use a portable video camera. Working with Shuya Abe, Paik created a color video synthesizer to incorporate distorted images. In addition to his exhibition at the Smithsonian American Art Museum (SAAM) in Washington, D.C., where Electronic Superhighway is displayed, Paik had major exhibitions at The Guggenheim and the Whitney Museum. Paik coined the term "electronic superhighway" in 1974, and is considered the father of video and television art.

== Design and reception ==
=== Design ===
A stitched photo of all 50 states in the artwork. Alaska and Hawaii hang on the left wall next to the contiguous U.S. map.

Electronic Superhighway: Continental U.S., Alaska, Hawaii is a video art installation created in 1995 and composed of 575 feet (175 m) multicolored neon tubing, 336 television sets, 50 DVD players (originally VHS players), and 3,750 feet (1,140 m) of cable. It is approximately 15 feet (4.6 m) tall, 4 feet (1.2 m) wide, and 40 feet (12 m) long, with a total volume of 2,400 cubic feet (68 m^{3}).

The installation forms a map of the United States, with Alaska and Hawaii separated from the contiguous United States. Due to space limitations in Paik's studio, the southern portions of Texas and Florida are tucked in at the bottom of the installation. Due to its small size, Rhode Island has only one small television. Each state is represented by video clips which Paik associated with it. Some clip subjects are commonly associated with the states, such as Idaho and potatoes. Other states show clips that are more nuanced to make the viewer think. Paik was inspired by the Interstate Highway System. He interpreted it in Electronic Superhighway by the fast-moving video clips, a representation of people moving quickly past sights while traveling on the road.

Imagery Paik chose included the following: The Wizard of Oz in Kansas; rapid clips of video segments including O. J. Simpson and the Golden Gate Bridge in California; Oklahoma! in Oklahoma; cactus, cowgirls, and the Waco siege are among the images seen in Texas; Meet Me in St. Louis in Missouri; presidents including Jimmy Carter and Dwight D. Eisenhower quickly flicker in Iowa, representing the Iowa caucuses; composer John Cage in Massachusetts; musician Charlotte Moorman in Arkansas; choreographer Merce Cunningham in Washington; the Kentucky Derby in Kentucky; President Abraham Lincoln and rapid scenes of Chicago in Illinois; the Indianapolis 500 in Indiana; amateur sports in Colorado; the civil rights movement in Mississippi; 1972 presidential nominee Senator George McGovern in South Dakota; winter scenes in Alaska; and South Pacific in Hawaii. There is a small closed-circuit camera representing Washington, D.C., allowing visitors to see themselves.

=== Reception ===
Electronic Superhighway is one of Paik's most-lauded works of art. It is also considered one of the most popular works in the SAAM. Chris Kilmeck wrote in the Washington Examiner that Electronic Superhighway was "fantastic" and a "sculptural tableau...[that] is an expression of Nam June's love for the U.S." Philip Kennicott, art and architecture critic for The Washington Post, noted the installation is an "old favorite" and "essential icon" of the museum, but he has also said it is "corrupted" and lacks "wistfulness" compared to Paik's earlier works. He argues that since it was first made, technology has advanced far enough that Electronic Superhighway seems dated, but that decades from now it might be more appreciated. According to former SAAM director Betsy Broun, Electronic Superhighway is a "reflection of everybody's experience all across the country...In some ways, we worry that contemporary art has gotten to be a conversation among a very small subset of Americans, but not this work. This work really is here for everybody. And I think people deeply love it.

South Korean contemporary art organization Public Delivery described the installation and its impact: "Electronic Superhighway creates an overwhelming impact on visitors when they first see it...Each state is represented through a video clip that conveys his understanding of it. Paik shows how our concept of the different states has been formed by film and television. While some states are represented by popular TV series or books, he uses his personal connections to depict some states."

== Acquisition and display ==
=== Acquisition ===
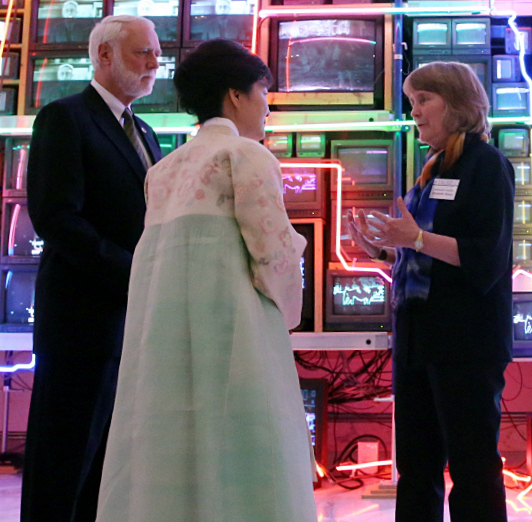
South Korean President Park Geun-hye and Smithsonian Institution Secretary G. Wayne Clough listen to Betsy Broun in 2013 during an exhibition on Paik's works.

In 1995, Broun saw Paik's Megatron/Matrix installation at the Guggenheim Museum SoHo. She expressed her high opinion of the work to one of the SAAM's board of commissioners, Ken Hakuta, who happened to be Paik's nephew. In 1998, the SAAM purchased Megatron/Matrix. Four years later, the museum received Electronic Superhighway as a gift from Paik. When the work arrived, it was packed in a box and missing televisions and other materials. Paik would often reuse materials from his installations. According to Broun, "One thing about [Paik] is that he never curated his career."

=== Display ===
The entire thing had to be reassembled, including replacing the neon lighting, and buying the televisions and additional VHS players. In the early-to-mid 2000s, the museum was closed for renovations, so the installation was assembled at a warehouse. Paik died in January 2006, five months before the museum reopened with Electronic Superhighway on display.

Electronic Superhighway proved to be popular with visitors. It is located in the SAAM's Lincoln Gallery, a long hall on the third floor where President Lincoln held his second inaugural ball in what was then the Patent Office Building. In 2009, the SAAM was chosen by Paik's estate to receive the artist's archive. The SAAM was chosen over other museums including The Guggenheim, the Museum of Modern Art, and the Whitney Museum. Among the large archive which arrived in seven large trucks were some of Paik's works, and his sketches, plans for future works, correspondences, and electronics.

John Hanhardt, curator of the SAAM at the time, said the archive was "fundamental in understanding the changes in late 20-century art." In 2012 and 2013, the museum hosted an exhibit on Paik's work, including Electronic Superhighway, and more than 140 items from the archive. Among the visitors to the exhibit was South Korean President Park Geun-hye.

In 2021, the SAAM began a renovation of its galleries displaying contemporary and post-1945 modern art, which included doubling the space for artworks and a reinterpretation of its collection. The renovation was completed in 2023 with almost 100 pieces on display. Called "American Voices and Visions", the SAAM created a focus on works by women and people of color, who make up over half of the artists represented. Electronic Superhighway is still one of the main features, along with other pieces the museum has displayed for years, including Nenuphar by Alexander Calder and For SAAM by Jenny Holzer.

Near Electronic Superhighway are two additional works by Tiffany Chung and Firelei Báez that reinterpret maps. Roger Caitlin wrote in Smithsonian magazine "Electronic Superhighway also helps herd another new aspect of the floor: a state-of-the-art gallery dedicated to time-based media, which includes film, video, audio and digital technologies that unfold over time."
