= Shigeko Kubota =

Japanese artist (1937–2015)

- Shigeko Kubota in her studio, 1972
- Born: August 2, 1937; Maki, Nishikanbara, Niigata, Empire of Japan
- Died: July 23, 2015 (aged 77); New York City, New York, U.S.
- Education: Tokyo University of Education; New York University; The New School
- Known for: Sculpture; video art; performance art
- Spouses: David Behrman (div. 1969) Nam June Paik (m. 1977; died 2006)

Shigeko Kubota (久保田 成子, Kubota Shigeko) (August 2, 1937 – July 23, 2015) was a Japanese video artist, sculptor and avant-garde performance artist, who mostly lived in New York City. She was one of the first artists to adopt the portable video camera Sony Portapak in 1970, likening it to a "new paintbrush." Kubota is known for constructing sculptural installations with a strong DIY aesthetic, which include sculptures with embedded monitors playing her original videos. She was a key member and influence on Fluxus, the international group of avant-garde artists centered on George Maciunas, having been involved with the group since witnessing John Cage perform in Tokyo in 1962 and subsequently moving to New York in 1964. She was closely associated with George Brecht, Jackson Mac Low, John Cage, Joe Jones, Nam June Paik, and Ay-O, among other members of Fluxus. Kubota was deemed "Vice Chairman" of the Fluxus Organization by Maciunas.

Kubota's video and sculptural works are mainly shown in galleries. Her use of the physical television as a component of her work differs from other video artists of the 1960s who made experimental broadcast programs as a move against the hegemony of major networks. Kubota is known for her contribution to the expansion of the field of video into the field of sculpture and for her works addressing the place of video in art history. Her work explores the influence of the technology, and more specifically the television set, on personal memory and the emotions. Some works for example eulogize while also exploring the presence of the deceased in video footage and recorded images such as her Duchampiana series, the video My Father, and her later works Korean Grave and Winter in Miami which eulogize her husband Nam June Paik. Kubota's sculptures also play with ways in which video footage and sculptures utilize videos to evoke nature, as in her Meta-Marcel, Bird, and Tree series' and in River, and Rock Video: Cherry Blossoms.

== Early life and professional activity ==
Kubota was born as the second oldest of four girls to a family of monk lineage associated with a Buddhist temple in Niigata Prefecture, Japan, where she lived through World War II. She described herself as "of a religious Buddhist family," and familial connections to monastic life would inform later Zen concepts in her work. Because her father was a Buddhist monk, Kubota had often witnessed funerals as a child and spent time alone, supposedly playing with ghosts in a temple room where fresh bones were stored. She drew on these vivid memories of death in her video art.

Her parents appreciated the arts and supported their children in studying them, despite the expectation of women to work as part of the productive force at the time. Her maternal grandfather was a calligrapher and landowner who encouraged his daughter and his granddaughters to pursue various arts. Kubota's mother, for example, was one of the first female students at what is now the Tokyo National University of the Arts and Music. Art brought Kubota to Tokyo as a young adult as well: during her high school years, Kubota met an enthusiastic art teacher who urged her to apply to the Tokyo University of Education, where she earned a degree in sculpture in 1960.

Even early in her career, Kubota won recognition for her skill but was also noted as pursuing unconventional approaches. One of her paintings of flowers won an award in the well-regarded Eighth Annual Exhibition of Nika-kai (1954), one of the major juried-exhibition art associations. Though this painting is no longer extant, Kubota's high school teacher praised it for a "uniqueness characterized by strong lines and brushstrokes that do not appear to be executed by a girl." Perhaps because of such boundary transgressing, Kubota's aunt, Chiya Kuni—an established modern dancer—introduced her to the Tokyo-based experimental music collective Group Ongaku. Members of Group Ongaku included Takehisa Kosugi, Chieko Shiomi, and Yasunao Tone, who were all experimenting with tape recorders, noise music, and avant-garde performances in the early 1960s. This musical interest, in turn, led to her first encounter with John Cage and Yoko Ono at Tokyo Bunka Hall in Ueno when Cage was on tour across Japan in 1962. Kubota observed how untraditional the tour performers, including Yoko Ono, were in destroying every convention of music; she thus thought to herself that if Cage's music was accepted in New York, she should be accepted there, too. Kubota found affinities between herself and Cage because she felt unappreciated in the Japanese art world due to her unconventionality. But Ono also became an important contact for Kubota and other Japanese artists looking to learn more about American avant-garde movements such as Fluxus. Kuboto visited Ono's apartment in Tokyo in 1963 and saw Fluxus event scores, which inspired herself and other members of Group Ongaku to send their own event scores to George Maciunas, the founder of the Fluxus movement, in New York. Through this introduction, Kubota became involved in the Fluxus circle and began experimenting with a wider range of media, from text scores to performance.

In December 1963, Kubota had her first solo show, "1st Love, 2nd Love..." at Naiqua Gallery in Tokyo, an alternative/avant-garde space in Shinbashi, Tokyo, housed in a former office of internal medicine (naiqua means internal medicine), in which she "piled up fragments of love letters from the floor up to the ceiling of the gallery" and covered the stack with a white cloth, creating an unstable mound. "Visitors were forced to work their way up the pile of paper scraps" in order to see an array of welded metal sculptures placed at the top. The exhibition, which might be considered environmental sculpture now as inspired by Allan Karpow's notion of "environments," was accompanied by a score: "Make a floor with waste paper which are all love letters to you. Spread a sheet of white cloth on the floor. Skin your lips by yourself. Kiss a man who has a mustache in the audience." Through the gallery Kubota met and collaborated with avant-garde collectives such as Hi Red Center and Zero Jigen (Zero Dimension). However, Kubota noted difficulty in getting recognition and write-ups in newspapers and art magazines in Japan and later recalled that she "realized that female artists could not become recognized in Japan."

Later that year, in 1964, she moved to New York after exchanging letters with George Maciunas about the New York Fluxus scene. In a letter to Maciunas (written just before her departure for New York), Kubota expressed a mixture of anxiety and hope: "In every day I was very worry which is better to be in Tokyo or to be in New York in order to live as an only artist. But now I made up my mind to go to New York... It's my only hope to go to New York in order to live as an artist, but for you, it's no mention without the biggest trouble to you. But I'd like to touch, to see and feel something by touching a group of Fluxus and living myself in New York." She would be lifelong friends with George Maciunas until his death in 1978. Her live-work space in SoHo, which she occupied from 1974 to her death in 2015, was situated in a neighborhood at the center of the avant-garde art scene, due partially to Maciunas's Fluxhouse Cooperative project for affordable artist housing and studio spaces. Kubota's proximity to influential collaborators from this community included her immediate Mercer Street neighbor, the experimental artist Joan Jonas. She also actively maintained close relationships with Japanese avant-garde artists in Tokyo, especially bringing the activities of Hi Red Center to the attention of Maciunas and other Fluxus members. Kubota's first show in New York was on July 4, 1965, at Cinemateque as part of the perpetual Fluxfest, where she performed her famous "Vagina Painting." After this exhibition, Kubota exhibited her works regularly in New York. Kubota continued her studies at New York University and the New School for Social Research (1965–1967). She studied at the Art School of the Brooklyn Museum 1967–1968. In 1972 to 1973, Kubota came together with artists Mary Lucier and Cecilia Sandoval, and the poet Charlotte Warren in the feminist collaborative troupe White Black Red & Yellow (sometimes also rearranged to Red White Yellow & Black as a play on the "red, white, and blue" of the American flag) to put on three "multimedia concerts" at The Kitchen in New York.

Kubota taught at the School of Visual Arts, and was video artist-in residence at Brown University in 1981; at the School of the Art Institute of Chicago in 1973, 1981, 1982, and 1984; and at the Kunst Akademie in Düsseldorf in 1979. She also helped to coordinate the first annual Women's Video Festival at The Kitchen in 1972. From 1974 to 1982 Kubota served as the first (and only) video curator, and one of the few women or people of color, associated with the Anthology Film Archives. Kubota also collaborated with Electronic Arts Intermix (EAI) to present Video Art Reviews at Anthology, further strengthening what EAI's director Lori Zippay called the "alternative ecosystem." In addition to studying, managing Fluxus events, and exhibiting internationally, Kubota also worked as a New York-based international critic for the Japanese art magazine Bijutsu Techo (Art handbook), for which she took photographs and wrote articles on the New York art scene until 1971, thus fostering artistic dialogues across linguistic, geographic, material, and gender divides. In 1991, the American Museum of Moving Image in New York presented a nearly thirty-year survey of Kubota's work.

She died in Manhattan, New York on July 23, 2015, at the age of 77 from cancer. Upon her death, Norman Ballard was named as executor of her estate in order to continue promoting her work and legacy. Ballard is an artist and long time close collaborator with her late husband, artist Nam June Paik, as well as a close friend of the Paik family. He became the founding director of the Shigeko Kubota Video Art Foundation, located in her historic home in SoHo. Seven years after she passed, the MoMA and the Museum of Contemporary Art in Tokyo had exhibitions dedicated to the life and art of Kubota. The MoMA exhibition, Liquid Reality, showed her most acclaimed video sculptures, while the Tokyo exhibition, Viva Video!, displayed works that had never been in an exhibition. Kubota emphasized eulogy in many of her artistic pursuits and was similarly eulogized by museums and the foundation created in her name.

== Artistic medium and development ==
Kubota was one of the first artists to commit to video art and new media, long before its status as an art form was widely recognized. Her early work with Fluxus centered around 1965, after moving to New York City, before she moved on to explore new artistic directions and video. She was known for early video making on the Sony Portapak, one of the first compact individually-operated cameras, as previous models required whole crews. She described filming with this camera in gendered terms: "Portapak and I travelled all over Europe and Japan without male accompaniment. Portapak tears down my backbone, shoulder, and waist. I travel alone with my Portapak on my back, as Vietnamese women do with their babies." Her first experiments with a video camera were manipulated close-up self-portraits, made using the newly invented Paik/Abe Video Synthesizer while she, Paik, and artist Shuya Abe were teaching art at CalArts in 1970-71. Among these tapes was A Day at the California Institute of the Arts, which evidence suggests was retitled as Self-Portrait and incorporated into the sculptural work Video Poem (1970–75). From these works, Kubota quickly pivoted to what would become her signature "video diary" approach, through which she documented personal and artistic journeys, added text or audio commentary, and integrated early image-processing techniques like chroma keying, matting, and colorizing to create a "fusion of video documentary and video art, aiming at the higher dimension of consciousness in style and semantics."

In the 1970s, Kubota also pioneered the medium of video sculpture by extending her videos into three-dimensional plywood, sheet metal, and Mylar forms, in collaboration with friend and artist Al Robbins. With these constructions, Kubota aimed to challenge widely-held notions that video art was "fragile," "superficial," "temporal," and "instant," as compared to more established art forms. Her sculptural practice also resisted video's association with mainstream media and corporate technology, by camouflaging the television's hardware. She stated, "I used plywood to cover the TV box, partly because I didn't want people to know what brand the TV was; I just wanted them to see it as a sculpture." Some of her first video sculptures pay homage to Marcel Duchamp, an artist with whom she felt a deep kinship and met twice in her life. Named within Duchampia series, Duchampia: Nude Descending a Staircase (1976) was proposed for acquisition by curator Barbara London after being included as part of The Museum of Modern Art's Projects series for emerging artists. It entered the museum's collection in 1981 under the Department of Painting and Sculpture, as MoMA's first acquisition combining video and sculpture.

In the late 1970s, in parallel with her Duchampaniana series, she began making video sculptures that foreground nature through the combination of what she termed (in a likely nod to Marshall McLuhan) "cool forms," creating volumetric sculptural objects referencing the contours of mountains, rivers, and waterfalls, with "hot video," in which her imagery of these features is colorized, fragmented, repeated, or totally deconstructed. Kubota's use of video embedded in landscape and topography becomes a means to contemplate the self. Kubota utilized especially the landscapes of the American West as an infinite and untamed expanse that recall the nomadic movements of people, including herself as a Japanese artist living in America and moving through the international art world. Works such as Three Mountains and River use constructed sculptures to evoke a sense of place and employ video integrations as a way to expand the horizons of both landscape and sculpture. Her interest in nature as a central theme in her video and sculptural work continued with sketches of Land art interventions that she termed "structural video" works, which would have embedded video monitors in the mountain ridges of Arizona and New Mexico. These works, though unrealized, illustrate the artist's imaginings of a synthesis of nature and technology, a lifelong subject of interest. In the 1990s, Kubota also drew on ecology to produce installations of work like Windflower (Red Tape) (1993), Videoflower (1993), Windmill II (1993), and Bird II (1994), and Videotree (1995) which take the form of twisted trees and flowers of metal embedded with small video monitors. At the same time, Kubota's hybrid objects transgressed boundaries between video sculpture and Minimalist sculpture, resembling at times Donald Judd's plywood, rectilinear volumes while simultaneously at odds with monocultural, male-dominated American art historical trends of the movement.

Kubota's relationship to the formal qualities of video extended beyond the physical camera and took varied forms. In a text about her work River, for example, Kubota drew connections between water and video: "A river is replicated in video in its physical / temporal properties and in its information-carrying and reflective 'mirror' qualities... Rivers connected communities separated by great distances, spreading information faster than any other means... Charged electrons flow across our receiver screens like drops of water, laden with information carried from some previous time (be it years or nanoseconds)." In preparatory sketches for works such as Three Mountains and Niagara Falls I, Kubota expresses the formal properties of video as malleable, like ink washes and line drawings. Having worked in video since its beginnings as an art form, her technical skills in adding texture and depth to her tapes included editing them on playback decks, incorporating computer-generated graphics, overlaying subtitles, reediting, reiterating, and resequencing footage. Later work explores memory processes in relation to video, both in its technological imperative to store and access recorded events and in its self-reflexive connection to autobiography.

== Marriage ==
In 1977, Kubota married the artist Nam June Paik after divorcing her first husband, the composer David Behrman, in 1969. After Paik suffered a series of strokes in 1996, Kubota dedicated a huge amount of time and energy to managing his work and life, becoming his primary caregiver, and effectively slowing production of her own work at the time. They remained together until Paik's death in 2006. Despite Kubota's persistent and pioneering impact on the development of video art, especially video sculpture, her contributions have long been eclipsed within art historical discourse by Paik. While the couple collaborated throughout their thirty-year marriage, Kubota recounts that the concept of video sculpture was her own: "In the beginning, Paik only used the television set, just like that, bare, without anything. Then I told him that a television by itself is not a work. It could be found in any store, he needed to add something. He didn't listen to me, so I decided to do it myself, in the late Sixties. Video Sculptures with all kinds of materials, with super 8 and moving images from films."

== Feminism ==
Whether Kubota's work can be described as feminist has been a topic of interest in the scholarship and presentation of her work. Kelly O'Dell writes that Kubota's references to Marcel Duchamp, Jackson Pollock, and Yves Klein, are used by feminist critics to describe Kubota's work as problematizing the interest of the Western canon in masculine rendering, to reclaim art for women. However, Kubota does not characterize her works as feminist. In an interview with the Brooklyn Rail, she said, "People can put me in the Feminist category all they want, but I didn't think I can make any real contribution other than my work as an artist." But artists who are largely considered feminist may not personally identify as such for a variety of reasons. Judith Butler argues that the label of feminism works against the integration of a larger spectrum of ideas relating to gender and identity into the discourses about art by encapsulating feminist arguments as a separate strain of history or art history. Despite Kubota's reluctance to declare a feminist stance, she was frequently identified as a feminist by her close friends and colleges, such as Mary Lucier, who stated that Kubota was "a radical feminist, unhappy about her status as a woman artist in Japan and easily angered by the slightest perceived injustice". She did not explicitly include feminist themes in her artwork, but rather allowed her own views on gender issues, femininity, the male gaze, and the intersection of the body with technology and nature, to influence her artwork.

Feminist art historians have also emphasized Kubota and other women artists' estrangement and marginalization from the Fluxus movement. Midori Yoshimoto writes that Kubota's Vagina Painting, which is her most explicit work about gender in art, was poorly received by her peers involved in Fluxus, similarly to ways in which Yoko Ono and Carolee Schneemann's performances were considered "un-Fluxus" because of their strong emphasis on feminine subjects. Still, in a 1993 exhibition catalog In the Spirit of Fluxus, art historian Kristine Stiles writes that Kubota's Vagina Painting "redefined Action Painting according to the codes of female anatomy," adding, "The direct reference to menstrual cycles seems to compare the procreation / creation continuum lodged in the interiority of woman with the temporal cycles of change and growth she experienced in her own art and life after moving from Japan to the United States." However, the radicalism of this artwork is overshadowed by the circumstances of its creation, as in an oral interview for MoMA’s C-MAP global research project, " she recalled that she was “begged to do” the piece by two male artists—Maciunas and Nam June Paik", making her most famous artwork a product of the pressure she received from men to eroticize her art, rather than her efforts as a woman to create artwork in a male-dominated space. Afterwards, she never created an artwork like 'Vagina Painting' again. There is also interest in the overshadowing of Kubota's career by her husband Nam June Paik's as an issue of the gender biased art world.

In addition to Kubota's co-founding of the feminist video collective Red, White, Yellow, and Black, scholars suggest Kubota's video art coincided with the rise of second-wave feminism. As curator and critic Emily Watlington suggests, “unburdened by history and thus patriarchal conventions, its capacity for live, instant feedback allowed women to image themselves rather than be depicted by men.” The collective used the experimental tool to their advantage, paving their way into a novel art form.

== Installations and videos ==
=== 1st Love, 2nd Love... ===
While in Tokyo, Kubota became friends with Yoko Ono, who was at the time involved in Fluxus and the New York art scene. Kubota and other members of Group Ongaku and began working on poetic "scores" and sending them to Yoko Ono's contact, George Maciunas, in New York. Midori writes, "the term Happenings was more popular than events in Japan, so Kubota called these poetic works 'Happenings.' Their form and poetic content, grew out of influences from Fluxus scores, such as instructions by Ono."

Kubota's first exhibition in 1963 titled, 1st Love, 2nd Love... exhibited these Happenings as conceptual works. The exhibition was at Naiqua Gallery, an alternative exhibition space in Shinbashi, Tokyo. Kubota exhibited tons of crumpled paper, which she called 'love letters' mounted on the walls and ceiling and covered in white cloth, which she called a Beehive. Her scores of instructions, A Beehive 1, A Beehive 2, and A Blue Love I, and A Blue Love 2 were included in the exhibition. The happenings and other printed items were sent to George Maciunas who printed them in Fluxus publications.

=== Vagina Painting ===
Vagina Painting was performed at the Perpetual Fluxus Festival in New York in July 1965. In the performance, Kubota assumed a crouching position over a sheet of paper on the floor with a brush affixed to the crotch of her underwear and painted abstract lines in blood red paint. The work is often cited as a female rejoinder to Jackson Pollock's action or drip paintings and to Yves Klein's use of the female body as a painting tool in his Anthropometrics of the Blue Period (1960) in which female models covered in blue paint imprinted their bodies in white paper on a floor. The red paint is reminiscent of menstrual blood, but also can be juxtaposed with Jackson Pollock's ejaculatory motion of his paintings. Kubota placed the paintbrush at the site of phallic lack, which breaks into a new type of female empowerment. The strokes of the paintbrush recall calligraphy, a reference to her cultural heritage. The work has been associated with feminist art, although Kubota never publicly expressed if she considered the work feminist or not. The work was largely criticized by the predominantly male Fluxus milieu but was later lauded as a historic act of feminist performance art.

In Into Performance: Japanese Women Artists in New York, Midori Yoshimoto notes the possible relationship with Kubota's work and hanadensha ("flower train"), a geisha trick that including using their vaginas to draw calligraphy by inserting paintbrushes into the body. Kubota's vertical stance over the surface on which she paints could reference the masculine tradition of calligraphy drawing in Japan as well as the whole-body method of Abstract Expressionist Jackson Pollock.

=== Duchampiana Series ===
This series of works spans from the 1960s to 1981 and includes documentaries that Kubota filmed when she met Marcel Duchamp personally in the 1960s, and sculptural homages to Duchamp created after his death.

- Marcel Duchamp's Grave, 1972–1975: Footage of Kubota's visit to the Duchamp family's grave in Rouen, France is played on a freestanding plywood construction with more than twelve nine-inch monitors attached. A mirror is placed on the floor to reflect the footage. Kubota presents her blue book from film stills of her video Marcel Duchamp and John Cage to the grave. The installation was first exhibited at The Kitchen in New York in 1975.
- Duchampiana: Video Chess, 1975: A monitor in a plywood box plays Kubota's footage of Duchamp and Cage playing chess and a second version of Kubota playing chess with a naked Nam June Paik. The installation also includes a glass chessboard, a photograph of Duchamp and Nam June Paik playing chess, Kubota's book Marcel Duchamp and John Cage and handpainted wall texts.
- Duchampiana: Nude Descending a Staircase,1976: Television monitors are embedded in each of the four steps in a wooden staircase made by Al Robbins. Clips from Super 8 film of the filmmaker Sheila McClaughlin, rendered in brightly-colored pixels, walking down stairs loops in the monitors. The installation takes its name from Duchamp's painting of the same title. Kubota's wall text reads, "Video is Vacant Apartment/ Video is a Vacation of Art./ Viva Video."
- Duchampiana: Door, 1976–1977: A small room with two doorways next to each other on a corner, and one door able to open one and close the other at the same time. In the room, two monitors play a video of a photograph of Marcel Duchamp mixed with images of Old Faithful, and including audio of Duchamp's voice. Construction of the doors and wood frames was done by Al Robbins.
- Duchampiana: Bicycle Wheel, 1983 and Duchampiana: Bicycle Wheel One, 1990; Duchampiana: Bicycle Wheel Two, 1990; and Duchampiana: Bicycle Wheel Three, 1990: Bicycle wheels with small, five-inch color monitors attached to the spokes are motorized to spin.

=== Video Poem ===
In Video Poem (1976), Kubota's self-portrait is displayed on a small monitor that viewers can see through a vulva-shaped opening of a purple bag. A fan, placed inside the bag to keep the equipment cool, added pulsating movements. The bag had been given to her by her first boyfriend, Takehisa Kosugi, whom she used to support by working three jobs. Video Poem challenges male authority by her use of her ex-boyfriend's bag.

=== Meta Marcel: Window Series ===
This series references Marcel Duchamp's wood-framed 'Fresh Widow'. This series includes four separate video works which are projected behind a plywood box with glass windows framing a twenty-four inch monitor.

- Meta Marcel: Window (Snow), 1976–1977: Kubota met Duchamp during a snowstorm while both were on a flight en route to Buffalo, NY in the year of his death, 1968. The video screen is filled with 'snow'– the effect achieved by image distortion on a television set, and the window pane is substituted for black leather, and the video is appropriately called Snow. This piece was part of Kubota's Meta-Marcel series.
- Meta Marcel: Window (Flowers), 1983: Footage of flowers.
- Meta Marcel: Window (Stars), 1983: Footage of stars.
- Meta Marcel: Window (Snow With Computer Writing), 1991.

=== River, 1979-1981 ===
Consists of three monitors suspended screen-down over a crescent shaped metal structure filled with water. The videotapes playing on the monitors reflect in the water and the structure. Describing the moving images in River, Kubota states, "Once cast into video's reality, infinite variation becomes possible... freedom to dissolve, reconstruct, mutate all forms, shape, color, location, speed, scale... liquid reality." It was first shown at the Whitney Museum of American Art. It was restored in 2017 by the Shigeko Kubota Video Art Foundation, and installed in 2018 at MIT, and then SculptureCenter in New York, for the exhibition Before Projection.

=== Other installations and sculptures ===
- Fluxus Suitcase, 1964: Aluminum suitcase sent from Japan to George Maciunas in New York as mail art. Kubota has shown it as a memorial to George Macinuas and Al Robbins in recent years.
- Fluxus Napkins, 1965: Original paper napkins with collage made for a Fluxus dinner organized by George Maciunas for Kubota, Chieko Shiomi, Takako Saito, and Nam June Paik.
- Fluxus Pills, 1966: Empty gelatin pill capsules in a plastic box made for George Maciunas.
- Video Poem, 1968–1976: Kubota's color-synthesized tape Self-Portrait is encased within a nylon bag with zippered openings, which rests on a wooden pedestal. The bag was made by the Japanese artist Takehisa Kosugi (1963).
- Three Mountains, 1976–1979: Three freestanding plywood structures: two mountains with monitors inside, one of a pyramid with a monitor inside. The tapes include footage of a Grand Canyon helicopter trip; a drive on Echo Cliff, Arizona; and a Teton sunset.
- Video Relief, 1979–1981: Two plywood panels with round lenses and one with painted calligraphy– each showing the video Shigeko in Berlin (1979).
- Rock Video: Cherry Blossom, 1981
- Berlin Diary: Thanks to My Ancestors, 1981: Wood rope helps fasten a sheet of pink crystal with Japanese calligraphy of Kubota's ancestor's names on a five-inch monitor.
- Video Haiku– Hanging Piece, 1981: A round television with a closed circuit camera hangs over a round, concave plastic mirror (42 in (110 cm) diameter) so that the image is visible in the mirror.
- Green Installation, 1983: A large plywood structure that resembles a two-sided, freestanding staircase has five monitors playing a color videotape of the Arizona landscape on each side.
- Niagara Falls I, 1985;Niagara Falls II, 1987;Niagara Falls III, 1987. A freestanding wall with many monitors projecting images of the four seasons, and covered in mirror shards. A speaker plays a recording of the waterfall at Niagara Falls. A sprinkler system hangs over the piece and pumps water from pipes over the wall to a basin below the sculpture.
- Rock Video: Cherry Blossoms: 1986, 12:54 min, color, silent: A five-inch monitor is embedded in a boulder and shows a single-channel video of cherry blossoms. Shards of Mirrors are placed around the rock.
- Dry Mountain, Dry Water, 1987–88: Seven plywood sculptures are covered with Mylar mirrors and shaped like rocks and abstract 3-D geometrical shapes. Video projectors on the wall and floor show a two-channel video of cherry blossoms.
- Adam and Eve, 1989–1991: Two life-sized robot figures with eight embedded monitors total are paced near each other. Behind the Video is Video Byobu II (Cherry Blossoms)
- Video Byobu I (Cherry Blossoms), 1988; Video Byobu II (Cherry Blossoms), 1991; Video Byobu III (Cherry Blossoms), 1991.
- Bird I, 1991, and Bird II, 1992: Videos of birds in sculptural installation.
- Study for Wheel, 1990
- Jogging Lady, 1993: Footage of women running marathons playing on monitors stacked to resemble a human form.
- Tree I and Tree II, 1993: Sculptures of a tree whose branches have become resting places for television monitors.
- Pissing Boy, 1993: A sculpture of a robot urinating into a tin. Kubota has said the sculpture is of Nam June Paik.
- Sexual Healing, 1998
- Nam June Paik I and II, 2007: An installation of metal piping sculptures with video monitors attached that suggest Nam June Paik's body. Footage of Kubota and Paik on vacation in Miami in 1996 plays on these monitors, and the video serves as a homage to Paik.

=== Videography ===
- Marcel Duchamp and John Cage: 1972, 28:27 min, b&w and color, sound: Shigeko Kubota recorded the Reunion performance of Marcel Duchamp and John Cage, a chess match in which music was produced by a series of photoelectric cells underneath the chessboard, triggered sporadically by normal game play. Kubota assembled this video using her own photographs and video. Reunion turned out to be the last public meeting of these artists. In 1972, during a visit to Duchamp's grave in Rouen, Normandy, Kubota recorded the tomb and her 1970 book Marcel Duchamp and John Cage placed on top of it.
- Broken Diary: Europe on 1/2 Inch a Day: 1972, 30:48 min, b&w and color, sound: Europe on 1/2 Inch a Day is the first of Shigeko Kubota's series of video diaries. Kubota used a Portapak to create the video travel diary of her travels through Amsterdam, Paris, and Brussels– which includes footage of underground performances, Kubota's meeting with Joseph Beuys in Düsseldorf, graffiti, and a visit to Marcel Duchamp's grave in Rouen, Normandy, which inspired her later sculptural work, Video Chess. The chapter Europe on Five Dollars a Day offers a realistic view of the complications of budget travel, for women in particular, meant to counter the unrealistic gloss of popular travel books.
- Riverrun– Video Water Poem: 1972: The video installation is made up of six distinct channels, four showing footage that she shot while filming Broken Diary: Europe on 1/2 Inch a Day - featuring the Seine, the Rhine, the Venice canal, and the Amsterdam canal. A fifth monitor showed the Hudson river. Finally, the sixth monitor shows a live feed of visitors drinking orange juice which spouts from a fountain in the installation. The video includes audio excerpts from James Joyce's Finnegans Wake.
- My Father (Shigeko Kubota), 1973–1975: In the film she explains that when she found out her father had died of cancer she decided to film herself mourning, intoning, “Father, why did you die?” In the footage, Kubota cries while watching videos she recorded of herself and her father watching TV at his home in Japan. Kubota juxtaposes the banality of pop music and New Year's celebrations with the suffering relationship between the father and daughter pair. By revealing the ironic duality of a video image being so real and yet so unreal, Kubota leads the viewer to consider the meaning of death.
- Video Girls and Video Songs for Navajo Sky: 1973, 31:56 min, b&w and color, sound: In 1973, Shigeko Kubota began experimenting with image processing equipment at WNET's TV Lab and produced Video Girls and Video Songs for Navajo Skies. The video is a surreal diary of Kubota's stay with artist Cecilia Sandoval and her Navajo family on a reservation in Chinle, Arizona with footage of the family and the surrounding landscape.
- Allan 'n' Allen's Complaint: Nam June Paik and Shigeko Kubota: 1982, 28:33 min, color, sound
- Trip to Korea: 1984, 9:05 min, color, sound: The story of Nam June Paik's first trip to Korea after thirty-four years of being in the USA. Video includes footage of Nam June Paik's family, and his visits to a Korean village, and a graveyard where his ancestors lay.
- SoHo Soap/Rain Damage: 1985, 8:25 min, color, sound: Video of Kubota's co-op studio at 110 Mercer Street, New York, and rain damage during a storm.
- George Maciunas With Two Eyes 1972, George Maciunas With One Eye 1976 :1994, 7 min, b&w, sound
- Sexual Healing: 1998, 4:10 min, color, sound
- April is the Cruelest Month: 1999, 52 min, color, sound
- Winter in Miami: 2005 2006, 14 min, color, sound
- Korean Grave: 1993 (A homage to Nam June Paik)

=== Exhibitions ===
- Documenta 8, Kassel, Germany
- Stedelijk Museum Amsterdam
- The Kulturhuset, Stockholm
- Japan Society (New York)
- The Kitchen, New York, 1972, 1975
- Rene Block Gallery, New York 1976, 1977
- Whitney Museum of American Art, New York City, 1979
- Museum Folkwang, Essen, Germany
- Kunsthaus, Zurich, 1982
- White Columns, 1983
- New Langton Arts, San Francisco, 1986
- Documenta 6, Kassel, Germany, 1987
- Kongress Halle, Berlin, 1989
- Museum of Contemporary Art, Chicago
- Venice Biennale, 1990
- Sydney Biennale, 1990
- Retrospective: "Shigeko Kubota, Video Sculpture," American Museum of the Moving Image, Astoria, New York, 1991
- "Shigeko Kubota," Whitney Museum of American Art, New York, 1996
- "Duchampiana (1968–1995)", Galerie de Paris, 1996
- "Shigeko Kubota: Liquid Reality," Museum of Modern Art, 2021

=== Collections ===
- Hara Museum Contemporary Art, Tokyo, Japan
- Gino di Maggio, Fondazione Mudima, Milan, Italy
- Jorge Santiano Helft Fundacion San Telmo, Buenos Aires, Argentina
- The Museum of Modern Art, New York
- The Museum of Modern Art, Toyama, Japan

== Bibliography ==
- Butler, Judith. Bodies that matter: on the discursive limits of "sex". New York: Routledge. 1993.
- Butler, Judith. Gender trouble: feminism and the subversion of identity. New York: Routledge. 1990.
- Butler, Judith. Undoing gender. New York: Routledge. 2004.
- Cross, Lowell. "Reunion": John Cage, Marcel Duchamp, Electronic Music and Chess". Leonardo Music Journal. 9: 1999. 35–42.
- Gever, M. "Pressure Points: Video in the Public Sphere," Art Journal 45.3, 1985.
- Gewen, Barry. "State of the Art". New York Times. 2005.
- Goldberg, RoseLee. Performance: live art since 1960. New York: Harry N. Abrams Publishers. 1998.
- Jacob, Mary Jane ed. Shigeko Kubota: Video Sculpture. New York: American Museum of the Moving Image, 1991. Includes: Roth, Moria, "The Voice of Shigeko Kubota:' A Fusion of Art and Life, Asia and America,'" and Hanley, JoAnn, "Reflections in a Video Mirror."
- Mark, Lisa, WACK! Art and the Feminist Revolution. Cambridge, MA: MIT Press. 2007.
- O'Dell, Kelly, Fluxus Feminus, MIT Press (TDR) Vol. 41. No. 1, 1997. 43–60.
- Ruhrberg, Karl; Honnef, Klaus; Fricke, Christiane; Manfred Schneckenburger, Ingo F. Walther, Art of the 20th century. Taschen. 2000. 596.
- Sackler, Arthur M. American film. American Film Institute. 24–28. 1980.
- Schneider, Rebecca, The Explicit Body in Performance. New York: Routledge, 1997.
- Smith, Roberta, "Review/Art; Sleek Video Sculptures By Shigeko Kubota". The New York Times. (May 24, 1991), 26.
- Stiles, Kristine, "Between Water and Stone: Fluxus Performance, A Metaphysics of Acts," in Armstrong and Rothfuss, In the Spirit of Fluxus.
- Warr, Tracey, and Amelia Jones. The Artist's Body. London: Phaidon. 2000.
- Yoshimoto, Midori. "Self-exploration in Multimedia : the Experiments of Shigeko Kubota," in Into performance: Japanese Women Artists in New York. New Brunswick, N.J., Rutgers University Press. 2005.
