= The More, The Better =

Video sculpture

- 다다익선 (Korean), 多多益善 (Chinese)
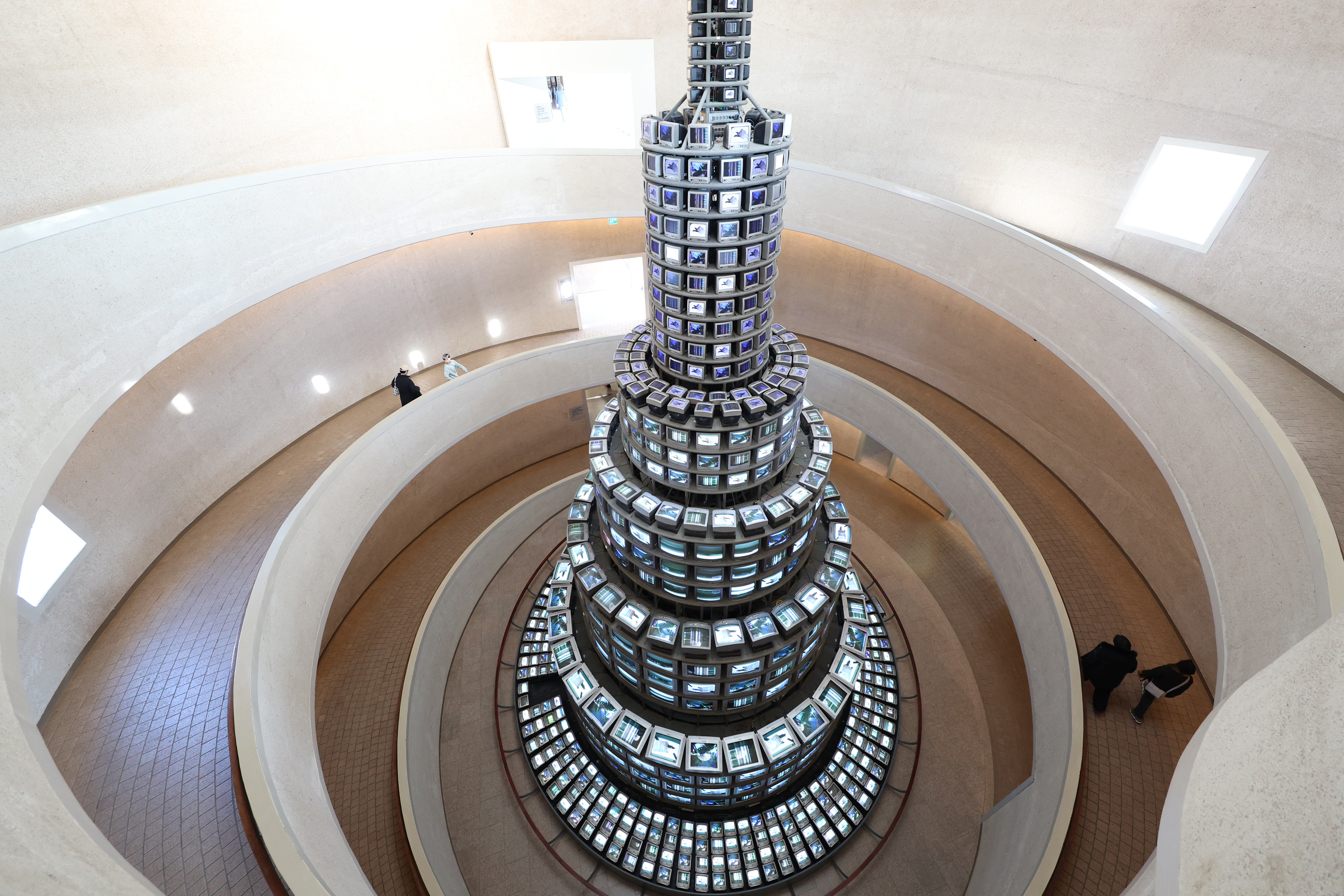
- The More, the Better (1988), following its comprehensive restoration in 2022
- Artist: Nam June Paik
- Year: 1988
- Medium: Video installation; four-channel video, color, sound; 1,003 monitors, steel structure
- Movement: Video art, Fluxus
- Dimensions: 1,850 cm × 1,100 cm × 1,100 cm (730 in × 430 in × 430 in)
- Condition: Restored (as of 2022); operational
- Location: National Museum of Modern and Contemporary Art, Gwacheon
- Accession: 03036

The More, the Better, alternatively referred to as Dadaikseon (Korean: 다다익선), is a video sculpture created by Nam June Paik for the purpose of the National Museum of Modern and Contemporary Art during the 1988 Summer Olympics. The sculpture consists of a tower measuring 8.5 meters (60.7 feet) in height and 11 meters in diameter, adorned entirely with an impressive arrangement of 1,003 cathode ray tube (CRT) television monitors. The work still stands in the rotunda of the National Museum of Modern and Contemporary Art in Gwacheon, Gyeonggi Province, South Korea.

== Creation ==
The More, the Better was commissioned for the 1988 Summer Olympics, marking the first occasion the Games were held in Paik's home country. The artwork incorporates a collection of Samsung televisions of various sizes and ages, showcasing the diversity and rapid advancements in television technology. The arrangement of screens displays a variety of imagery, including Korean folk drummers, Merce Cunningham's dance performances, airplanes, ceramics, birds, and more, presented in rapid succession. Paik distorts and manipulates these visuals, creating abstract and vibrant displays. The sculpture, designed by architect Won Kim, bears resemblance to both the Tower of Babel and a traditional stone pagoda.

The More, the Better, was designed to anticipate and embrace the spectacle that would define art museums in the future. The sculpture's structural composition and the dynamic imagery displayed on the screens were intended to captivate viewers while evoking a sense of playfulness. By presenting a diverse range of imagery, the artwork aimed to overwhelm and challenge traditional notions of media consumption, preventing definitive satisfaction for the viewer.

The work attracted an audience of 50 million viewers through a broadcast that featured entertainment from various parts of the world. The event aimed to capture the artistic highlights of multiple cultures in a single space, celebrating the connectivity and global fellowship facilitated by television. It is worth noting that the title of the installation has an ironic connection to mass production and consumerist culture, which reflects South Korea's own economic aspirations.

In 1986 as part of the preparations for the 1988 Summer Olympics, the construction of the MMCA (Museum of Modern and Contemporary Art) building in Gwacheon was completed. The MMCA's design resembled the Guggenheim Museum in New York. To differentiate the MMCA, Nam June Paik was commissioned to create a centerpiece that would distinguish it. Paik designed and installed a video tower titled Dadaikseon (The More, the Better; 1988) on the main ramp of the MMCA building. Although the new centerpiece aimed to set the MMCA apart, it still retained resemblances to the Guggenheim.

The backdrop of the 1988 Summer Olympics, along with the support from the government and corporations, provided Paik with opportunities to realize his artistic visions. He received extensive support and was frequently commissioned to create projects for international events hosted by Korea, such as the 1986 Asian Games, the 1988 Summer Olympics, and the Expo '93.

During this period, Paik's close association with Samsung held great significance. Despite being relatively unknown as an electronics brand outside of Korea at the time, Samsung showed support for Paik, on the condition that he exclusively used Samsung TV monitors. This partnership established a symbiotic relationship, as both Paik and Samsung worked together to promote a modernized and globally recognized image of Korea.

== Restoration of artwork ==
Nam June Paik's The More, The Better under restoration

The More, the Better underwent a temporary shutdown due to safety concerns following an assessment conducted by the Korea Electrical Safety Corporation in March 2018. The assessment revealed fire risks, necessitating a comprehensive restoration project by Kwon In-Chul, the installation's curator.

During restoration, each cathode ray tube (CRT) monitor on the tower underwent meticulous inspection. Among them, 737 damaged CRT monitors were repaired using secondhand monitors and components, ensuring proper functionality. An additional 266 monitors were deemed beyond repair. They were replaced with LCD screens, designed to maintain the outward appearance of CRT monitors. These LCD screens, 6- and 10-inch in size, occupy the tower's upper section. The cooling systems of the monitors were refreshed to enhance their performance and longevity. A six-month test run took place from January to July of that year to ensure the successful restoration.

The restoration project also saw the restoration of all eight videos from the original installation. The MMCA retrieved and restored these videos from their archive, presenting them as part of the special exhibition titled "Merry Mix: The More, the Better. This exhibition showcased Paik's artistic vision, which he described as a "merry mix of the old enfants terribles and the new." As part of the comprehensive restoration plan announced in September 2019, the 18.5-meter-tall tower underwent the final stage, including a six-month test run in January and concluding on July 8.

This exhibition showcased the restored installation and also featured interviews and archival materials that provided invaluable insights into the rich history of this artwork. Initially created in 1988, the tower has experienced technical problems and has required frequent repairs since 2003. The three-year restoration plan aimed to preserve the work's prototype, ensuring its long-term stability and accessibility for future audiences.

== Legacy and influence ==
The More, the Better pushed the boundaries of traditional art forms and introduced new possibilities for artistic expression. Paik's innovative use of television and interactive technology paved the way for future generations of artists working with video and new media.

The installation also played a role for South Korea, as it showcased the country's cultural and artistic renaissance during the Seoul Olympics.The More, the Better became what some critics call "an iconic symbol" of the event and remains an important part of the nation's artistic heritage.
