= Sharon Grace =

American artist

Sharon Grace is an American artist, currently a Professor Emeritus at the San Francisco Art Institute, who is known for initiating the use of many forms of electronic media based in audiovisual technology. Since 1970, Grace has worked with telecommunications as art, embedding interactive video and speech recognition in her work including video installation, electronic synthesis, interactive digital systems, and sculpture in stone and steel.

Grace first began working with video in Gestalt therapies by recording people interacting with each other, allowing the subjects to observe themselves in their roles.

== Work ==
=== Send/receive ===
Many artists worldwide including Grace helped realize the SEND/RECEIVE live broadcast, a telecommunications milestone that linked artists and the public to have a presence on the emerging internet.

In 1977, artistic experimentation with communication technologies allowed interactive, two-way collaboration in cyberspace. Liza Bear, Willoughby Sharp, Keith Sonnier in the East Coast and Carl Loeffler, Sharon Grace, and many artists in the West organized the world's first live interactive composite image dance performance SEND/RECEIVE. Together they set the stage for the first two-way satellite transmissions between New York and San Francisco using CTS communication satellites co-owned by NASA and the Canadian government. Artists on the East and West were able to communicate in real time interacting with information traveling freely across boundaries meanwhile the program broadcast live to viewers nationwide.

Grace was the artist and project leader for the West Coast chapter of the SEND/RECEIVE Network. Working as the artist technician at AMES Center, she produced three days of live interactive programming where musicians, dancers, composers, philosophers, and conceptual artists shared images, audio, and text. Together Grace and NASA engineer Skip Gross successfully created the first “split screen” joining the two coasts in “cyberspace”.

On September 10 and 11, 1977, artists provided a medium for instant response to work projected on the screen by the two groups simultaneously. Artists from eleven cities in the US and Canada created a video conference where texts are read and video material is recorded, the broadcast consisted of discussion and debate, readings, and prerecorded video footage. The decentralization of telecommunications terminals was the beginning of sending and receiving - where two channels of projected information and electrical impulses move in two directions, said organizer Keith Sonnier.

The live feed relayed to Manhattan Cable's public access channel in New York and to Bay Area's public access station. Viewers could watch on channels 3, 4, 6, and 8, reaching almost 25,000 spectators nationwide.

The coordination to produce SEND/RECEIVE “illustrates the agility and creativity required of artists who attempt to utilize cutting-edge technologies can result in innovative applications unattempted by industry or the government”

Sharon Grace in regards to SEND/RECEIVE:

“We created what was really the first artists’ telecommunication network. Initially the images were black and white because at that point there wasn't enough bandwidth for color. The network was global, and we began day and night transmissions between artists, poets and performers. We called the initial group the Artists’ Prototype Network, because we knew it was a prototype and would lead to an ever-expanding network, which, in-fact, it did. The work that we produced with “Send/Receive” and the Artists’ Prototype Network shaped the form and the language of the technological paradigm that has resulted in the global connectivity model we are living in. Our desire was to connect the planet in a global dynamic conversation; we wanted everyone's voice to become part of it.”

=== Video Synthesizer ===
At Cal Arts, student Grace participated in the Paik/Abe apprenticeship along with six other students. Nam June Paik and Abe-san challenged the students to build their own Video Synthesizer. Grace then also became a close collaborator with Paik and Abe, traveling around the country, soldering and building machines with them. The three became a production team for the purpose of making the youth happy. By the end of the 70's long after her collaboration with Paik-Abe, Grace created a video piece using the synthesizer she had built with Paik-Abe called “Metaphors”. It went on to win an NEA award and appreciated for its meditative aspect. She built the soundtrack by playing a Buddhist Meditation Bowl and filtering it through the synthesizer's velocities and the sound would integrate video color bursts on a screen. She later donated her Paik/Abe Synthesizer in the Nam June Paik Art Center in Seoul, South Korea, now on permanent display and in working condition.

=== Millennium Venus ===
In 1990, Grace created an interactive video laserdisc installation programmed to respond to the viewer's speech. The viewer/participant would communicate with the program through a telephone on a desk that rings when the participant enters the room. When the phone is answered the large video display comes alive with the image of a woman who begins to talk to the participant through the phone.

"The feminine cyborg whispers untold secrets about the Millennium and waits for a reply. She talks from a time different from our own, a time of disappearance. She talks about the eternal variations in a new language, a new system of representation between stimulus and answers. In the end she asks if it is possible to dwell in time, to invent life span, to reinvent space. Equipment used to construct this exhibition is a PC workstation, voice recognition, surveillance, and video laserdisc."

== Featured publications ==
- Art Journal
- Intersections of Art, Technology, Science & Culture
- Arte Virtual
- Telematic embrace : visionary theories of art, technology, and consciousness
