= Ken Hakuta =

American inventor (born 1951)

- 白田 健
- Born: Paik Kun (白健); 1951 (age 74–75); Seoul, South Korea
- Other name: Dr. Fad
- Occupations: Businessman, inventor, television personality
- Spouse: Marilou Cantiller
- Children: 3
- Relatives: Nam June Paik (uncle); Ali Wong (Former daughter-in-law)

Ken Hakuta (born 1951), known as Dr. Fad since 1983, is an American businessman, inventor, and television personality. Hakuta, as Dr. Fad, was the host of the popular children's invention TV show The Dr. Fad Show, which ran from 1988 to 1994. The show featured children's inventions and promoted creativity and inventiveness in children. Hakuta was the organizer of four Fad Fairs, conventions of inventors with fun, wacky ideas, in Detroit, New York City and Philadelphia.

== Overview ==
Hakuta imported and merchandised the Wacky Wall Walker, one of the best selling toys of the 1980s. The Wacky Wall Walker became a fad hit in 1983, and over 240 million units have sold. In 1983, NBC aired an animated Christmas special, Deck the Halls with Wacky Walls, to capitalize on the toy fad. Their popularity peaked after the Kellogg Company inserted them as free prizes in cereal boxes. The VH1 program "I Love the 80s: 1983" features Dr. Fad and the Wall Walkers.

Hakuta is also an art collector and is particularly known for a large group of Shaker items, furniture and other pieces, that he purchased in 1991. These are now part of the so-called Mount Lebanon Shaker Society collection.

In 1998, Hakuta built on his long-standing interest in herbal medicine to found AllHerb.com, an eCommerce company offering herbal remedy products and information. AllHerb.com sought to differentiate itself from other competitors in the space by positioning itself as "the most authentic resource for herbal medicine available today"; for instance, one of its spokespeople was a shaman, tribal healer, and herbalist from the Peruvian rainforest. AllHerb.com ceased operations in February 2000.

Hakuta has been featured in numerous media including: The Washington Post, The New York Times, the Los Angeles Times, the Detroit Free Press, USA Today, Time, Newsweek, Forbes, Fortune, Inc., Entrepreneurship, Business Week, CBS Evening News, 60 Minutes, 48 Hours, Lifestyles of the Rich and Famous, Oprah, Geraldo, Today Show, The Tonight Show, Late Night with Conan O'Brien, The Don and Mike Show, Larry King, and numerous radio shows around the country. There are two Harvard Business School case studies on AllHerb.com: "Ken Hakuta: AllHerb.com" and "AllHerb.com: Evolution of an E-tailer".

== Personal life ==
Hakuta was born in Seoul, South Korea. His Korean name is Paik Kun (백건), and he was born as the first child of Paik Nam-il, who was the CEO of a textile manufacturing company originally owned by his father, Paik Nag-seung, who was accused in 2002 of having been a chinilpa during the Japanese occupation of Korea. The textile manufacturing company was the biggest of its kind during the Japanese colonial era in Korea. His family relocated to Japan in 1951, where they changed their Korean surname to a Japanese name based on the original Chinese character (白). Ken Hakuta subsequently grew up in Japan. He received his Master of Business Administration from Harvard University in 1977. Hakuta married Marilou Cantiller, a Filipina he met while the pair worked at the World Bank, in 1977. The pair have three children: Justin, Kenzo, and Aki. Justin is the former husband of comedian Ali Wong.

Hakuta is the nephew of the video artist Nam June Paik and was the manager of Paik's New York City studio at the time of his death. He is the executor of his uncle's estate.
