= Wacky WallWalker =

Toy

Wacky Wallwalker as a cereal box prize

The Wacky WallWalker was a toy molded out of a sticky elastomer. It was shaped similar to an octopus and when thrown against a wall would "walk" its way down. It was a hugely popular toy in the early 1980s.

Before its introduction in the United States, Ken Hakuta received in the mail several sticky octopus-like toys from his mother, who lived in Japan. They were intended for his children, but Hakuta found himself fascinated with the toy, which was called Tako (Japanese for "octopus") in Japan. He realized their marketing potential, and after purchasing rights to the product in 1983 for $5,000, he began to market them locally in Washington, D.C., dubbing them "Wacky WallWalkers".

Their popularity was mediocre, until Nina Hyde of The Washington Post wrote a feature story on them. This created a buzz, and people in the Washington area flooded local stores to purchase them. As the fad began to decline, over 200 million Wacky WallWalkers had been sold, raking in about 20 million dollars. Because of his success, Hakuta became a consultant for other fad inventors, calling himself "Dr. Fad".

The popular toy was featured in the 1983 animated Christmas special Deck the Halls with Wacky Walls, starring the voices of Daws Butler, Tress MacNeille, and Marvin Kaplan. The show featured seven Wallwalkers from the planet Kling-Kling: Big Blue, Springette, Bouncing Baby Boo, Crazylegs, Stickum, Wacko, and their leader, Kling-Kling. One character in the special was modeled after Hakuta's son, Kenzo.

In Toy Story 3, the character Stretch, voiced by Whoopi Goldberg, is based on a Wacky Wallwalker.
