= Govy =

French artist (1981–2023)

- Born: Angélique Adrianna Govy; 12 April 1981; Mont-Saint-Aignan, France
- Died: 18 August 2023 (aged 42)
- Other names: Jimmy Owenns; Kennedy James
- Occupations: Artist, Designer, Performer, Director, Producer
- Years active: 1998–2023
- Known for: Visual Art; Design; Autism rights activism
- Notable work: Photographic Diary; Serial Bondage; Yozakura Sake Set; SpaceTime Coordinates
- Movement: Neurodiversity
- Awards: A' Design; Videoformes
- Website: dontstareatthesun.com

Angélique Adrianna Govy (12 April 1981 – 18 August 2023), better known as Govy, was a French artist diagnosed on the autism spectrum in 2013, and was an advocate for the neurodiversity movement. Their career began after their interactive art piece Photographic Diary in 2000 to 2001. Govy's work, including under the work names "Kennedy James" and "Jimmy Owenns", has been exhibited internationally at the Zendai MoMA of Shanghai, Triennale Design Museum of Milan, Wiels Contemporary Art Center of Brussels, Casoria Contemporary Art Museum of Naples, Rosario Museum of Contemporary Art of Santa Fe (Argentina) and Nuit Blanche of Paris. They are the recipient of three A' Design awards and two Videoformes awards.

== Early life and work ==
Angélique Adrianna Govy was born on 12 April 1981. Before debuting their visual work with photography, Govy performed in a few theater, video pieces, and films, but then decided to focus on writing. In 1999, they published the first book on the internet that actually looked like a real book, which would be published in 2001 under the title Mes Cendres Nues by French publisher IDLivre. Their early writing is also part of the French poetry anthology Les Nouveaux Poètes Français et Francophones, published by Edition Huguet in 2004.

== Visual art ==
Govy was best known for their interactive art piece Photographic Diary (2000–2001) in which they took series of photographs every day during a year and the series of Shibari installations Serial Bondage (2006–2013) which incorporates their fascination with Japanese rituals and aesthetics.

In 2000, they started the interactive piece where they photographed their daily life during one year without interruption. This early piece launched their career as a visual artist as it was one of the first interactive pieces on the Internet at the time and created before the fashion of photographic diaries via blogs would start spreading worldwide in 2004. It could be considered an art piece very much about growing up on the Autism spectrum and struggling with a personal quest of identity or it could be seen as a work on the notions about the splitting of the perception, narration or psyche, and the search for identity. This work has received two awards and has been exhibited internationally in art galleries and museums and was featured in the book Taschen’s 1000 Favorite Websites.

From 2015, Govy focused more on science and space art projects. They mostly worked on the concept of spacetime (or the 4th dimension) and a "specific individual human life in the bigger picture of the universe" with the "SpaceTime Coordinates" projects, which use data from NASA JPL to generate personalised art pieces.

Govy was the recipient of three A' Design awards and two Videoformes awards. Their work has been exhibited internationally at the Zendai MoMA of Shanghai, Triennale Design Museum of Milan, Wiels Contemporary Art Center of Brussels, Casoria Contemporary Art Museum of Naples, Rosario Museum of Contemporary Art of Santa Fe (Argentina) and Nuit Blanche of Paris. Their first design piece, the "Yozakura sake set" (designed under Their workname Kennedy James) was available at the MoMA design store in NYC and Tokyo.

== Pseudonyms ==
From 2001 until 2008, they used the artist name "Jimmy Owenns" with the tagline "Artist Without a Sexual Identity". In 2008, they adopted their second artist name "Kennedy James" and moved to New York City with an artist visa. Since 2015, they have used the name "govy", their French family name.

== Muse ==
In 2011, a photograph of their face was used to launch the storytelling website Cowbird, with the first story published "1000 Words" written by Scott Thrift.

The City and Horses pop band wrote the song "My Strange Ways" about their relationship in 2013.

== Death ==
Govy died on 18 August 2023, at the age of 42.
