= Artificial intuition =

Theoretical capacity of AI to develop human intuition

Artificial intuition is a theoretical capacity of an artificial software to function similarly to human consciousness, specifically in the capacity of human consciousness known as intuition.

== Comparison of human and the theoretically artificial ==
Intuition is the function of the mind, the experience of which, is described as knowledge based on "a hunch", resulting (as the word itself does) from "contemplation" or "insight".

Psychologist Jean Piaget showed that intuitive functioning within the normally developing human child at the Intuitive Thought Substage of the preoperational stage occurred at from four to seven years of age. In Carl Jung's concept of synchronicity, the concept of "intuitive intelligence" is described as something like a capacity that transcends ordinary-level functioning to a point where information is understood with a greater depth than is available in more simple rationally-thinking entities.

Artificial intuition is theoretically (or otherwise) a sophisticated function of an artifice that is able to interpret data with depth and locate hidden factors functioning in Gestalt psychology, and that intuition in the artificial mind would, in the context described here, be a bottom-up process upon a macroscopic scale identifying something like the archetypal (see τύπος).

To create artificial intuition supposes the possibility of the re-creation of a higher functioning of the human mind, with capabilities such as what might be found in semantic memory and learning. The transferral of the functioning of a biological system to synthetic functioning is based upon modeling of functioning from knowledge of cognition and the brain, for instance as applications of models of artificial neural networks from the research done within the discipline of computational neuroscience.

== Application software contributing to its development ==
The notion of a process of a data-interpretative synthesis has already been found in a computational-linguistic software application that has been created for use in an internal security context. The software integrates computed data based specifically on objectives incorporating a paradigm described as "religious intuitive" (hermeneutic), functional to a degree that represents advances upon the performance of generic lexical data mining.

== See also ==
- Artificial creativity
- Artificial imagination
- Artificial intelligence
- Concept-mapping and mind-mapping
- Connectionism
- Cybernetics
- Dreyfus's criticism of A.I.
- Information theory
- Intuitionistic logic
- Intuition (philosophy)
- List of concept- and mind-mapping software
- Natural language processing
- Panayiotis Zavos
- Usability

== Bibliography ==
- The Oxford Companion to Philosophy - E. Honderich (Oxford University Press, 1995) ISBN 0-19-866132-0
