= Grégory Lasserre & Anaïs met den Ancxt =

French digital artists

Grégory Lasserre & Anaïs met den Ancxt are also known under their artist name Scenocosme.

They live and work together since 2003 as contemporary artist of the movement digital artist.

== Biography ==
Anaïs met den Ancxt (born in 1981, in Lyon, France) graduated from the Art School of Lyon and the Design Art School of St Etienne.

Grégory Lasserre (born in 1976, in Annecy, France) has a master's degree in multimedia (Department of Visual Arts / Digital Arts from The University of Valenciennes), an engineer diploma in computer sciences (Avignon) and a diploma in Electronics (Annecy).

Their artworks consist mostly of sound and visual installations. They develop the software and technologies of their interactive artworks. Their digital art works are characterised by the introduction of natural elements in their technological art installation. They are also interested by the living bodies and the influences of energy as sources of sensitive interactions : like electrostatic energy and heat. Their installation "Akousmaflore" is a sensitive garden with real plants. Each plant is interactive and react to the human touch by different sounds. Their artwork "Kymapetra" is made with minerals turned into touch-sensitive sensors . These artists use also water and wood as elements capable to generate tactile, visual and sound sensory interactivity. Their interactive installations involve the audience socially and physically. The installation "Lights Contacts" invites the spectators to touch the others' skins and bodies to produce sounds and lights. The immersive installation "SphèrAléas" is an interactive geodesic space for ten spectators. Inside, they are invited to experiment and create together visual and musical performances in real time.

== Art works (selection) ==
- 2004 : SphèrAléas, immersive and interactive installation
- 2006 : Alsos, interactive installation reacting to the light.
- 2007 : Akousmaflore, interactive installation with real plants
- 2008 : Kymapetra, mineral interactive installation
- 2010 : Lights contacts, interactive installation with human body
- 2011 : Fluides, liquid interactive installation
- 2011 : Souffles, interactive installation reacting to human breath
- 2012 : Ecorces, interactive installation reacting to the human heat
- 2013 : Matieres sensibles (Sensitive matters), Sound Sculpture on wood, interactive marquetry
- 2014 : Metamorphy, interactive installation
- 2015 : Matière Noire / Dark matter, interactives installations
- 2017 : Inspirations : interactive installation with clay
- 2017 : Cogito ergo sum : interactive installation with salt
- 2017 : Membranes : interactive installation with leather
- 2019 : Kryophone : interactive installation with ice
- 2019 - 2020 : Reactive matter : interactive installation made with Programmable matter : Claytronics
- 2021 : Iris : interactive installation with gaze
- 2022 : Vibrisses : interactive installation with feathers

== Collections (selection) ==
- ZKM Center for Art and Media Karlsruhe (Germany)
- Fonds régional d'art contemporain : FRAC Alsace (France)
- Fond d'art numérique de la ville de Garges-lès-Gonesse (France)
- Dak Nong Museum - Gia Nghia (Vietnam)
- Musée d'Art et d'Industrie (fr) - Saint-Étienne (France)
- Musikantenland Museum - Thallichtenberg (Germany)
- Château de Ranrouët - Herbignac (France)

== Exhibitions (selection) ==
- ZKM Center for Art and Media Karlsruhe (Germany)
  - (2009 : "YOU[ser] 2.0") - curator : Peter Weibel
  - (2012 : "Sound Art. Sound as Medium of Fine Art") - curator : Peter Weibel
  - (2015 : "Exo-Evolution and Re-tooling") - curator : Peter Weibel
  - (2016 : "CODE_n exhibition") / curator : Peter Weibel
  - (2018 : "Art in Motion. 100 Masterpieces with and through Media. An Operative Canon") - curator : Peter Weibel
  - (2020, 2021 : "Writing the History of the Future") - curator : Peter Weibel

- HeK (Haus der elektronischen Künste Basel) - Basel (Switzerland)
  - (2015 : "Critical Make - turning functionality") - curator : Sabine Himmelsbach
  - (2022 : "Earthbound - In Dialogue with Nature") - curator : Sabine Himmelsbach

- International Biennial of Contemporary Art of Sevilla : BIACS - "Youniverse" - curator : Peter Weibel - (Spain) (2008)
- International Biennial of Contemporary Art of South America : Bienalsur (Argentina) (2017)
- International Biennial of Media Art : Experimenta - curator : Jen Mizuik - Melbourne (Australia) (2009, 2012)
- International Biennial of Media Art : Digital Culture - curators : Iury Lech, Valeriy Korshunov - Kiev (Ukraine) (2021)
- International Biennial of Media Art : WRO / Wro Art Center - Wroclaw (Poland) (2009)
- International Bienal de Arte Digital - Rio de Janeiro (Brasil) (2022)
- International Triennial of Media Art - TransLife - NAMOC | National Art Museum of China - Beijing (China) (2011)
- International Media Art Festival : Cyfest - "Cosmos and Chaos" - Saint Petersburg (Russia) (2021)
- International Media Art Festival : Microwave International New Media Arts Festival - (Hong Kong ) (2016)
- International Media Art Festival : FILE | Electronic Language International Festival - São Paulo (Brasil) (2014, 2016)
- International Media Art Festival : INDAF - "Tomorrow city" - curator : Dooeun Choi - Songdo (South Korea) (2010)
- Triennale Banlieue ! - Maison des arts de Laval - "Interrègnes" - curator : Marie Perrault - Laval (Canada) (2022)
- Biennale d'art contemporain : Sélest'art - Sélestat (France) (2019)
- Biennale Internationale Saint-Paul-de-Vence - curator : Catherine Issert (France) (2021)
- Biennale ArtFareins / Château Bouchet - curator : Jacques Fabry - Fareins (France) (2014, 2016, 2018, 2021 ,2025)
- Biennale d’art contemporain Alios - La-Teste-de-Buch (France) (2013, 2015)
- Biennale Experimenta / Arts et Sciences - Grenoble (France) (2013, 2020)
- Biennale CAFKA - Contemporary Art Forum - curator : Gordon Hatt - Kitchener (Canada) (2016)
- Bienal de Arte Digital - Rio de Janeiro (Brasil) (2023)
- International Symposium of Electronic Art - ISEA International
  - ISEA 2009 Belfast - Ormeau Baths Gallery - curator : Kathy Rae Huffman - Belfast (Irland) (2009)
  - ISEA 2011 Istanbul - "Uncontainable" - curator : Lanfranco Aceti - Istanbul (Turkey) (2011)
  - ISEA 2012 Albuquerque - 516 Arts artspace - "Machine Wilderness" - Albuquerque (USA) (2012)
  - ISEA 2013 Sydney - Powerhouse - "Museum Speak to Me" - curator : Jen Mizuik - Sydney (Australia) (2013)
  - ISEA 2016 Hong Kong - "Cultural R>evolution" - curator : Kyle Chung - (Hong Kong) (2016)
  - ISEA 2020 Montreal - "Why sentience ?" - Montreal (Canada) (2020)
  - ISEA 2024 Brisbane - "As Above, So Below" - Brisbane (Australia) (2024)

- Symposium d'art/nature - Moncton (Canada) (2012, 2016)
- Symposium Sound Symposium - International festival of art - St John's (Canada) (2013)
- Symposium Simpósio Internacional Natureza : Arte e Ciência - curator : Rodrigo Minelli - Belo Horizonte (Brasil) (2013)

- Museum : MOCAD - Museum of Contemporary Art Detroit - Detroit (USA) (2019)
- Museum : CAM Raleigh | Contemporary Art Museum of Raleigh - curator : Elysia Borowy-Reeder (USA) (2012)
- Museum : Telfair Museums of Art / Jepson Center for the Arts - curator : Harry DeLorme - Savannah (USA) (2023)
- Museum : Rubin Museum of Art - "The Power of Intention" - curator : Elena Pakhoutova - New York (USA) (2019)
- Museum : Daejeon Museum of Art - curator : Minkyung Kim - Daejeon (South Korea) (2012)
- Museum : MAK - Museum of Applied Arts, Vienna (Austria) (2017, 2018 : "Aestetic of Changes" - curator : Peter Weibel )
- Museum : Museum Sinclair-Haus - "Among Plants" - curator : Moritz Ohlig - Bad Homburg (Germany) (2025)
- Museum : MONA - Museum of Old and New Art - "Utopia Now" - curator : Jen Mizuik - Tasmania (Australia)
- Museum : Centre Pompidou - Paris (France) (2017, 2019)
- Museum : Art Gallery of Nova Scotia - curator : Sarah Fillmore - Halifax (Canada) (2011)
- Museum : Dak Nong - Gia Nghia (Viet Nam) (2019 : "Explorasound")
- Museum : MUDAC - Museum of Contemporary Design and Applied Arts - Lausanne (Switzerland) (2012, 2020)
- Museum : Ianchelevici - La Louvière (Belgium) (2012)
- Museum : LaM - Lille Métropole Musée d'Art moderne, d'Art contemporain et d'Art brut - Villeneuve d'Ascq (France) (2019)
- Museum : Ausstellungshaus Spoerri - curator : Daniel Spoerri - Hadersdorf-am-Kamp (Austria) (2017)
- Museum : New Orleans Jazz Museum - New Orleans (USA) (2019, 2022)
- Museum : Musée de Vence / Fondation Émile Hugues - Vence (France) (2022)
- Museum : Musée Louis Vouland - "Hortus 2.0" - curator : Véronique Baton - Avignon (France) (2017)
- Museum : Musée Bargoin - "Verdures : du tissage aux pixels" - Clermont-Ferrand (France) (2017)
- Museum : Musée de Millau et des Grands Causses - Millau (France) (2014, 2015, 2016, 2019, 2020)
- Museum : Musée Savoisien - Chambéry (France) (2014)
- Museum : Musée départemental de la Bresse - "Art contemporain au musée" - Saint-Cyr-sur-Menthon (France) (2013)
- Museum : Musée d'Art et d'Histoire de Saint-Brieuc - Saint-Brieuc (France) (2009, 2010)
- Museum : Musée des Marais Salants - Batz-sur-mer (France) (2025)
- Museum : Palais de la Découverte / curators : Floriane Perot and Sophie Radix - Paris (France) (2025, 2026)
- Fondation Claude Verdan Musée de la main - Lausanne (Switzerland) (2011, 2017, 2018)
- Fondation pour l'Art Contemporain Claudine et Jean-Marc Salomon - Annecy (France) (2016)

- Art Center : NCCA | National Centre for Contemporary Arts - Moscou (Russia) (2015)
- Art Center : Villa Romana - curator : Angelika Stepken - Florence (Italia) (2009)
- Art Center : Bòlit Centre d'Art Contemporani - "Nat[u]ra rumors" - curator : Rosa Pera Roca - Girone (Spain) (2011)
- Art Center : Banff Centre for Arts and Creativity | Convergence - international summit on digital art - Alberta (Canada) (2014)
- Art Center : Artengine - curator : Remco Volmer - Ottawa (Canada) (2019)
- Art Center : Eastern Edge Gallery - St John's (Canada) (2012)
- Art Center : Eyebeam (organization) - "BioRhythm: Music and the Body" - New-York (USA) (2012)
- Art Center : Watermans Arts Centre - curator : Irini Papadimitriou - Brentford-London (UK) (2011)
- Art Center : The Ancient Bath / 'Art Today' - curators : Emil Mirazchiev, Ilina Koralova - Plovdiv (Bulgaria) (2018)
- Art center : Artechouse - Washington (USA) (2019, 2025)
- Art center : Wonderspaces - Philadelphia (USA) (2018, 2019, 2020, 2021, 2022, 2023)
- Art center : OCT Shenzhen - "Augmented Senses" - curator : Charles Carcopino - Shenzhen (China) (2011)
- Art center : OCT Shanghai - "Augmented Senses" - curator : Charles Carcopino - Shanghai (China) (2011)
- Art center : LICA - Lancaster Institute for the Contemporary Arts - curator : Drew Hemment - Lancaster (UK) (2009)
- Art center : La Gaîté-Lyrique - Paris (France) (2012, 2013, 2016)
- Art center : Utsikten Kunstsenter - Kvinesdal (Norway) (2009, 2012)
- Art center : Labanque - curator : Philippe Massardier - Béthune (France) (2017)
- Art center : Galerie Le Manège / Institut français de Dakar - (Senegal) (2019)
- Art center : Les Églises - Chelles (France) (2019)
- Art center : Les Réservoirs - Limay (France) (2006, 2015)
- Art center : Le Labo - Toronto (Canada) (2011)
- Art center : Galerie du Beffroi - "Jardin des sens" - Namur (Belgium) (2018)
- Art center : Centre d’art île Moulinsart - Fillé-sur-Sarthe (France) (2018)
- Art center : Centre d’art d'Enghien-les-Bain - Enghien-les-Bain (France) (2010, 2011, 2012)
- Art center : Centre d’art contemporain Fort du Bruissin - "Vivant Numérique" - curator : Igor Deschamp - Francheville (France) (2015)
- Art center : Centre d’art contemporain Boris Bojnev - Forcalquier (France) (2012)
- Art center : Centre d’art contemporain Les Capucins - Embrun (France) (2012)

- Centre culturel de rencontre - Château de Goutelas - "Nouvelles faunes" - curator : Grégory Diguet - Marcoux (France) (2021)
- Centre culturel de rencontre - Parc Jean-Jacques Rousseau - Ermenonville (France) (2013)
- Centre culturel de rencontre - Abbaye de Noirlac - curator : Paul Fournier - Noirlac (France) (2011)
- Centre culturel Pauline Julien - curator : Marie-Eve Bérudé - Trois-Rivières (Canada) (2020)
- Centre culturel Passage Sainte Croix - Nantes (France) (2020)
- Centre culturel Bellegarde - Toulouse (France) (2012)
- Centre culturel Espace Bonnefoy - Toulouse (France) (2021)
- Centre culturel Odyssud - Blagnac (France) (2018)
- Centre culturel Le Prisme - Élancourt (France) (2020)
- Centre culturel - Maison Folie Hospice d’Havré - Tourcoing (France) (2011, 2022)
- Centre culturel - Maison Folie La Ferme d’en Haut - Villeneuve-d’Ascq (France) (2012, 2016, 2019)
- Centre culturel - Maison Folie le Colysée - Tourcoing (France) (2021)

- Espace d’art contemporain - L’Arteppes - Annecy (France) (2018)
- Espace d’art contemporain - L’Angle - La Roche-sur-Foron (France) (2017)
- Espace d’art contemporain - Le Point Commun - Cran-Gevrier (France) (2012)
- Espace d’exposition - La Serre - St Etienne (France) (2014)
- Espace d’exposition - Pavillon Grappelli - Niort (France) (2019)
- Espace culturel Moulay Ali - Marrakech (Morocco) (2018)
- Espace culturel L’Espinoa - Baignes (France) (2012)
- Espace culturel MAIF Social Club - Paris (France) (2017, 2019)
- Espace Fondation EDF - "La belle vie numérique !" - curator : Fabrice Bousteau - Paris (France) (2018)

- Art Fair : Abu Dhabi Art Fair - "Dunes and Waves" - curator : Fabrice Bousteau - (Abu Dhabi)(2013)
- Art Fair : Art Karlsruhe - "ZKM booth" - curator : Peter Weibel - Karlsruhe (Germany) (2014)
- Art Fair : Media Art Fair Unpainted - Munich (Germany) (2014)
- Art Fair : Media Art Fair Show Off Paris - curator : Dominique Moulon - Paris (France) (2014)

- World Expo 2010 - Shanghai (China) (2010)
- European Capital of culture Esch2022 - curator : Sabine Himmelsbach - Esch-sur-Alzette (Luxembourg)
- Taichung World Flora Exposition - curator : Hao Jhe Liao - Taichung (Taiwan) (2019)
- Congrès mondial acadien 2014 / Pavillon de la France - Grand-Falls (Canada) (2014)
- Queen Elizabeth Prize for Engineering / Prince Philip House - "Engineering Party" - London (UK) (2014)
- King Abdullah University of Science and Technology - KAUST - Thuwal (Saudi Arabia) (2014)

- Festival International EXIT / Maison des arts et de la culture de Créteil - Créteil (France) (2009, 2011, 2013)
- Festival International VIA - curator Charles Carcopino - Maubeuge (France) (2009, 2011, 2013)
- Festival international en arts électroniques : Mois Multi - Quebec (Canada) (2014)
- Festival international d’art contemporain A-part - Baux-de-Provence (France) (2012, 2013, 2014, 2015)
- Festival international Belluard Bollwerk - "Urban Myth" - curator : Sally De Kunst - Fribourg (Switzerland) (2010)
- Festival d'arts numériques : KIKK - curator: Marie du Chastel - Namur (Belgium) (2018)
- Festival d'arts numériques : Videoformes - curator : Gabriel Soucheyre - Clermont-Ferrand (France) (2010, 2014, 2018, 2025)
- Festival d'arts numériques : Accès(s) - Pau (France) (2011, 2021)
- Festival d'arts numériques : Némo - Paris (France) (2013)
- Festival d'arts numériques : Les Nuits électroniques de l'Ososphère - Strasbourg (France) (2009)
- Festival d'arts numériques : Arborescence - Aix-en-Provence (France) (2005)
- Festival d'arts numériques : Festival Scopitone - Nantes (France) (2005, 2019)
- Festival d'arts numériques : Electrochoc - Bourgoin-Jallieu (France) (2008, 2009, 2011, 2012, 2017, 2019, 2020)
- Festival d'arts numériques : Les Composites - Compiègne (France) (2017, 2018)
- Festival d'arts numériques : ON - Octobre Numérique / Palais de l'Archevêché - Arles (France) (2016)
- Festival d'arts numériques : Mirage - "Techno Fiction" - Lyon (France) (2016)
- Festival d'arts numériques : Safra’Numériques - curator : Didier Ringalle - Amiens (France) (2016, 2017, 2019, 2021)
- Festival d'arts numériques : Pléiades - Saint-Étienne (France) (2019, 2021, 2022, 2024)
- Festival d'arts numériques : F.A.N - Comines (Belgium) (2015)
- Festival d'arts numériques : Zéro 1 - La Rochelle (France) (2016, 2017, 2021, 2022)
- Festival d'arts numériques : Trace(s) - Bagnols-sur-Cèze (France) (2013, 2014, 2015)
- Festival d'arts numériques : Horizons Numériques / Abbaye de l'Escaladieu - Bonnemazon (France) (2011, 2012, 2013, 2015, 2018)
- Festival d'arts numériques : Univers Numériques Ugine (France) (2019, 2024)
- Festival City Sonic - curator : Philippe Franck - Mons (Belgium) (2010, 2014, 2019)

- Media Art festival : SXSW (South by Southwest) / "UNESCO Media Arts Exhibition" - Austin (USA) (2019)
- Media Art Festival : Lab30 - Augsburg (Germany) (2009, 2011, 2021)
- Media Art Festival : Share - Turin (Italie) (2008, 2019)
- Media Art Festival : Frequency - curator : Samantha Lindley - Lincoln (UK) (2018)
- Media Art Festival : Oddstream - curator : Lieke Wouters - Nijmegen (Netherlands) (2016)
- Media Art Festival : Leeds Digital - "Lumen Prize Exhibition " - curator : Carla Rapoport - Leeds (UK) (2016)
- Media Art Festival : Brighton Digital - The Phoenix Gallery - Brighton (UK) (2014)
- Media Art Festival : MIRA / Centre d'Art Santa Mònica - Barcelona (Spain) (2014)
- Media Art Festival : E-Fest - Palais Abdellia - curator : Afif Riahi - Tunis (Tunisia) (2014, 2015)
- Media Art Festival : Art & Algorithms - curator : Bill Ronat - Titusville (USA) (2015)
- Media Art Festival : Simultan - "Talking to Stranger" - curator : Levente Kozma - Timisoara (Romania) (2015)
- Media Art Festival : Digital_ia - Szczecin (Poland) (2013)
- Media Art Festival : Plektrum - "Ludo ergo sum" - curator : Marge Paas - Tallinn (Estonia) (2011)
- Media Art Festival : Futuresonic - "Environment 2.0" - curator : Drew Hemment - Manchester (UK) (2009)
- Media Art Festival : Rixc - "Techno-ecologies" - curators : Raitis Šmits, Rasa Šmite - Riga (Latvia) (2011)
- Media Art Festival : FAD - Festival de Arte Digita - Belo Horizonte (Brasil) (2010)
- Media Art Festival : EMAF - European Media Art Festival - "Mash up" - Osnabrück (Germany) (2010)
- Media Art Festival : ADAF - Athens Digital Arts Festival - Athènes (Greece) (2010)
- Media Art Festival : Rokolectiv / Cultural Center The Ark - curator : Cosmin Tapu - Bucharest (Romania) (2009)
- Media Art Festival : Streamfest - Lecce (Italia) (2007)

- Château de la Veyrie - "Présence" - curator : Gilles Fourneris - Bernin (France) (2019)
- Château de Lunéville - "Experientia !" - curator : Charles Carcopino - Lunéville (France) (2019)
- Château de la Louvière / Orangerie - "curator : Lucie Bisson" - Montluçon (France) (2017)
- Château de Saint-Saturnin / Festival Les Jours de Lumière - Saint-Saturnin (France) (2017)
- Château de Saint-Priest - Saint-Priest (France) (2014, 2015, 2016, 2019)
- Château de Beaulieu - Riorges (France) (2014)
- Château de Ratilly Centre d’art vivant - Treigny (France) (2013)
- Château de Suscinio - "Rêverie Moderne" - Sarzeau (France) (2013)
- Château de Malves - curator : Philippe Baudelot - Carcassonne (France) (2011)
- Château prieuré de Pommiers-en-Forez - Pommiers (France) (2016)
- Abbaye bénédictine Saint-Fortuné de Charlieu - Charlieu (France) (2016)
- Abbaye de l’Escaladieu - "Arbres, regards d’artistes" - Bonnemazon (France) (2018)
- Domaine du Muy - contemporary sculpture park - curator : Edward Mitterrand - Le Muy (France) (2021, 2022)

- Nuit blanche, White Night festivals
  - Nuit Blanche - Toronto (Canada) (2011)
  - Nuit Blanche - Zagreb (Yougoslavia) (2016)
  - Nuit Blanche - Paris (France) (2020)
  - Nuit Blanche - Bruxelles (Belgium) (2010)
  - Nuit Blanche - Amiens (France) (2007, 2010, 2012)
  - Nuit Blanche - Metz (France) (2011)
  - Nuit Blanche - Charleville-Mézières (France) (2016)
  - Nuit Blanche - Saint-Denis (La Réunion) (2014)
  - White Night - Brighton (UK) (2010)
  - White Night - Bucharest (Romania) (2015)
  - Nuit de la Création - La-Motte-Servolex (France) (2013, 2014, 2017, 2020, 2022)
  - Nuit de Lauzerte - Lauzerte (France) (2013, 2016)
  - Nocturne Art at Night - Halifax (Canada) (2012, 2013, 2016, 2017)
  - Lumière / Festival of Light - Vancouver (Canada) (2023, 2024)
  - Vilnius Light Festival - Vilnius (Lithuania) (2024)
  - Singapore Night Festival (Singapore) (2014)
  - Noche de Luna Llena - Segovia (Spain) (2012)
  - Culture Night - Dublin (Irland) (2015, 2017, 2018, 2019)
  - Light Night Leeds - Leeds (UK) (2025)
  - Light Up Festival - Lancaster (UK) (2016, 2017)
  - Light City - Baltimore (USA) (2018)
  - Dlectricity - Detroit (USA) (2021)
  - Luminaria - San-Antonio (USA) (2018)
  - Aurora - Dallas (USA) (2015)
  - Ignite Broward - Art & Light festival - Fort Lauderdale (USA) (2025)
  - Licht Festival - Murten / Morat (Switzerland, 2022, 2023)
  - Festival of Lights (Lyon) - Lyon (France) (2004, 2005, 2006, 2007)

== Awards (selection) ==
- Award lab30 Public's Choice Award : Lab30 Media Arts Festival - Augsburg (Germany) (2021)
- Award Public’s Choice Award : Art Week Miami Beach No Vacancy Art competition - Miami (USA) (2020)
- Grant from Fondation nationale des arts graphiques et plastiques (FNAGP) - Paris (France) (2017)
- Lumen Prize Silver Award (international award for digital art) (2015)
- Human Interface Award / Phaenomenale - Science & Art Festival / Phaeno Science Center - Wolfsburg (Germany) (2015)
- Interfaces Award / Interactive Art Competition : honorable mention - Porto (Portugal) (2015)
- Grant for Digital Art Ici ARTV (Canada) (2014)
- Award visual Arts and new technologies : Bains Numeriques #5 - international digital arts festival - Enghien-les-Bains (France) (2011)
- Award lab30 Public's Choice Award : Lab30 Media Arts Festival - Augsburg (Germany) (2011)
- Award «Most innovative production» : International Theatre and Dance Fair - Huesca (Spain) (2012)
- Award Qwartz Arts New Media (2012)
- LumiVille Trophies : Price young light originator - Lyon (France) (2013)

== Bibliography ==
- Rencontres sensibles Scenocosme / Edition : Les Réservoirs - lieu d’art contemporain, 2015
- Hybrid and sensory Interactive Artworks Scenocosme, 2014
- Parabol the retooling issue curated by Peter Weibel Karlsruhe Editions Section.d Section.a, 2014
- Touch and Go, Leonardo Electronic Almanac, Volume 18 Issue 3 Lanfranco Aceti, 2012
- ISEA2011 Uncontainable, Leonardo Electronic Almanac Ozden Sahin, 2012
- (French) Hybridation & art contemporain Edition Al dante – Aica, 2013
- (French) Arts numériques, Tendances, Artistes, Lieux & Festivals, 100 artistes français de la scène numérique contemporaine Editions MCD, 2008

=== Sources ===
- Augmented Sensations. An interview with Scenocosme Marisa Gomez, interartive.org, 2012
- Exhibition Soundart, Akousmaflore ZKM, 2012
- A Beijing Exhibition on Art for the 'Post-Human Era New York Times, Sheila Melvin, 2011
- Croisements Festival Digitarts.org, Alex Yu, 2011)

=== External links ===
- Official website of Scenocosme : Grégory Lasserre & Anaïs met den Ancxt
