= Videoformes =

Vidéoformes is an international video art event. Created in 1986, it's taking place at Clermont-Ferrand (France).

Since its first edition, Videoformes has hosted known authors in video art and digital arts, including; Nam June Paik, Steina and Woody Vasulka, Ed Emschwiller, Robert Cahen, Bill Viola, Gary Hill, John Sanborn, Jacques-Louis and Danielle Nyst, Michel Jaffrenou, Klaus vom Bruch, Bruce Nauman, Thierry Kuntzel, Studio Azzurro, Juan Downey, Ko Nakajima, Gianni Toti, Jonathan Monaghan, Reynold Reynolds, Catherine Ikam, Alain Fleischer, Tania Mouraud, Grégory Chatonsky, Miguel Chevalier and Scenocosme - Grégory Lasserre & Anaïs met den Ancxt.

== Award winners ==
- 2002: Christin Bolewski, incident.net (Grégory Chatonsky, Julie Morel, Karen Dermineur, Marika Dermineur, Reynald Drouhin), Laurent Vicente & Thomas Bernardet, Pierre-Yves Cruaud, Pascal Liévre, Christian Barani
- 2003 : Gabriela Golder, Christoph Oertli, Liisa Lounila, Sven Harguth, Pierre Villemin, Olivier Mégaton, Alicia Ortiz de Zavallos, Panoplie.org
- 2004: Haim Ben Shitrit, Sophie Loret-Naumovitz, Samer Najari, Cao Guimaraes, Thomas Berthelon, Nicolas Clauss & Jean-Jacques Birgé, Anonymes, Stanza
- 2005 : Vincent Dudouet, Jan Paters, Franck Dudouet, Adolph Kaplan, Jean-Gabriel Périot, Olivier Bosson, Stanza, Jimmy Owenns, Sylvain Hourany
- 2006 : Chris Oakley, Corine Stubl, Collectif_fact (Claude Piguet, Annelore Schneider, Swann Thommen), Helene Abram, Chia-chi Yu, Isabel Sadurni, Laurent Mareschal, Galina Myznikova
- 2007: Laurent Pernot, Kika Nikolela, Jimmy Owenns, Frank Minet
- 2008 : Nicolas Clauss, Mihai Grecu, Christoph Oertli, Jan Peters, Bernard Mulliez
- 2009 : Clorinde Durand, Maix Mayer, Neil Beloufa, Mihai Grecu
- 2010 : Wei Liu, HeeWon Navi Lee, Jim Vieille, Owen Eric Wood, François Vogel, Robert Croma, Vicent Gisbert
- 2011 : Nina Suominen, Shelly Silver, Reynold Reynolds, Jean-Claude Taki, Marie-Catherine Theiler & Jan Peters
