= Hybrid image =

Optical illusion

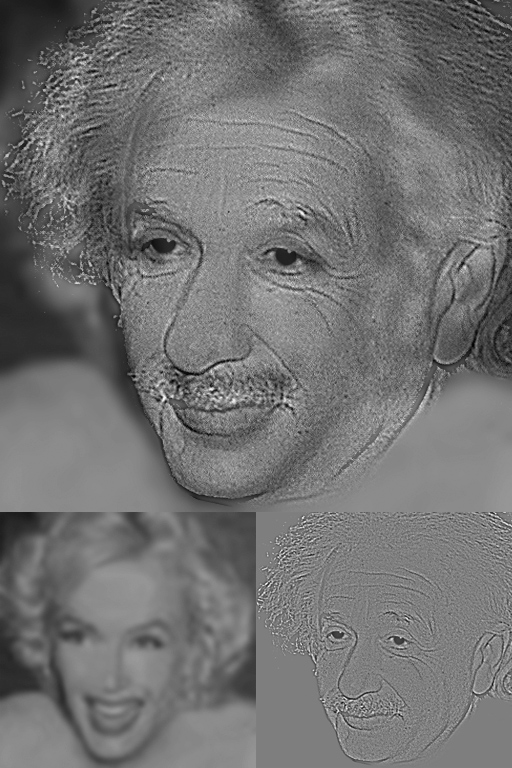
A hybrid image (top) constructed from low-frequency components of a photograph of Marilyn Monroe (left inset) and high-frequency components of a photograph of Albert Einstein (right inset).

A hybrid image is an image that is perceived in one of two different ways, depending on viewing distance, based on the way humans process visual input. A technique for creating hybrid images exhibiting this optical illusion was developed by Aude Oliva of MIT and Philippe G. Schyns of University of Glasgow, a method they originally proposed in 1994. Hybrid images combine the low spatial frequencies of one picture with the high spatial frequencies of another picture, producing an image with an interpretation that changes with viewing distance.

Perhaps the most familiar example is one featuring Albert Einstein and Marilyn Monroe. Looking at the picture from a short distance, one can see a sharp image of Einstein, with only a hint of blurry distortion hinting at the presence of an overlaid image. Viewed from a distance in which the fine detail blurs, the unmistakable face of Monroe emerges.

Other techniques that can help to see the "hidden" image include squinting, scrolling quickly over the image or looking at the thumbnail of the image.

== Gallery ==
A textual hybrid image reading "southwest" up close and "northeast" from afar

Video clip of a hybrid image showing a small golf ball that will show another spherical structure after being zoomed in

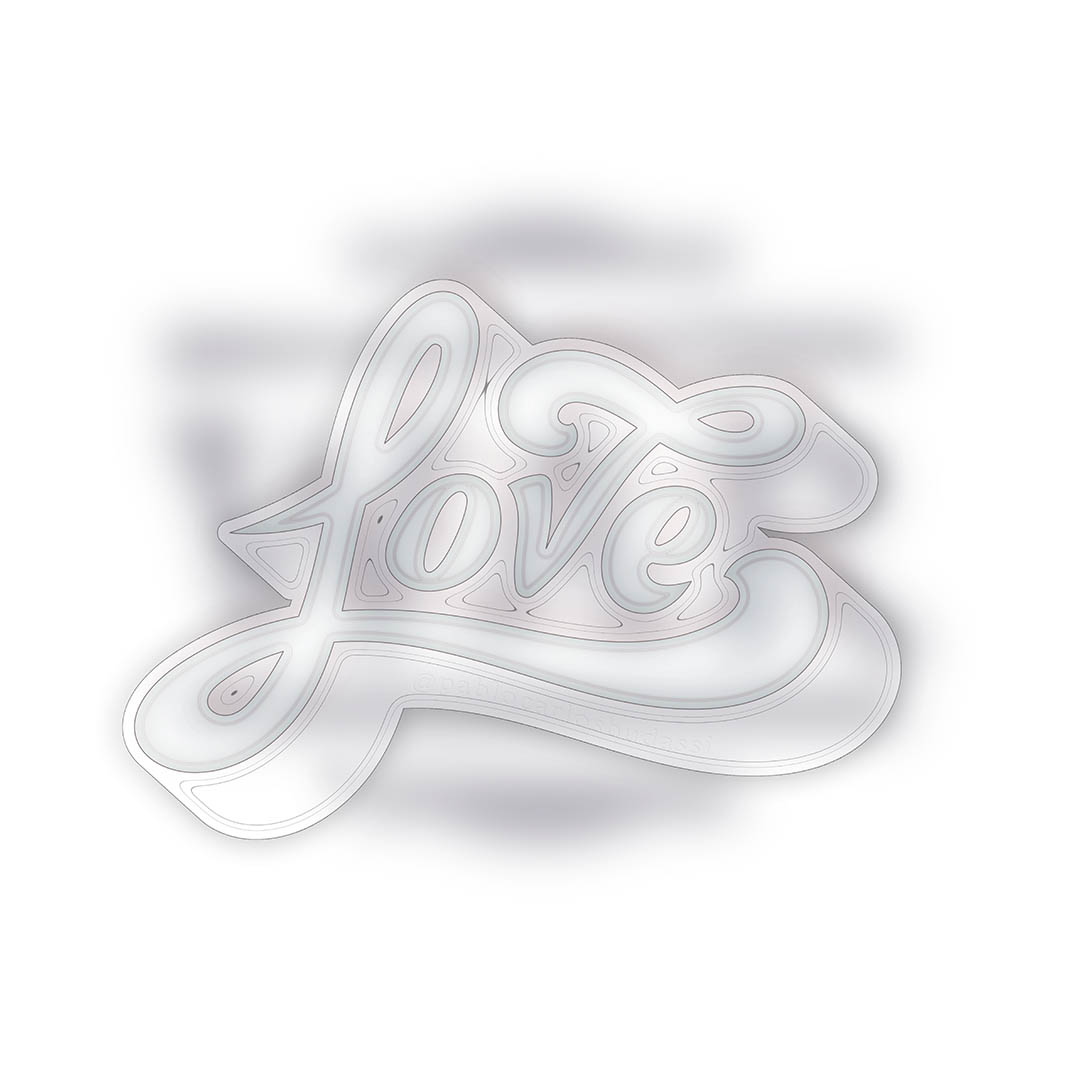
Hybrid image example. From close it reads "Love", from far it reads "WAR"
