= Aude Oliva =

French computer scientist

- Born: France
- Known for: computer vision, hybrid images
- Scientific career
- Thesis: Perception de scènes : traitement fréquentiel du signal visuel : aspects psychophysiques et neurophysiologiques
- Doctoral advisor: Jeanny Herault

Aude Oliva is a French professor of computer vision, neuroscience, and human-computer interaction at the MIT Computer Science and Artificial Intelligence Laboratory (CSAIL).

== Education ==
Oliva has a dual French baccalaureate in mathematics and physics. She then earned a Masters of Science in experimental psychology and cognitive neuroscience from the Institut National Polytechnique in Grenoble and then a doctorate from the same university in 1995. She joined the MIT faculty in 2004 and CSAIL in 2012.

== Research ==
Aude Oliva is MIT director in the MIT-IBM Watson AI Lab and director of strategic industry engagement in the MIT Schwarzman College of Computing. Oliva's group investigates how psychological perception of an image can change based on memorability, content, and limitations of human visual systems. Her most recognizable work is the hybrid image, the classic example of which combines the high-frequency outline and detail of Albert Einstein's face with a blurry, low-frequency image of Marilyn Monroe; the latter becomes focused only when viewed from long distances. Such images have found use in information privacy, time-lapses, marketing, and brainteasers. Another branch of her research deals with object-vs-scene image processing in human brains, where Oliva and others have postulated that part of our visual system focuses on a fast recognition and classification of a familiar scene (birthday party) rather than individual component objects in the scene (cake).

She has most recently used deep learning to teach computers how to recognize locations in an image by a combination of its features. For example, a bed, window, and posters might indicate a bedroom, while a stove, tile, and countertop might indicate a kitchen.

Oliva's work has been used by those in the field of artificial imagination, the concept of building a human-like consciousness from computer algorithms.

== Awards ==
- 2016 – Vannevar Bush Fellow
- 2014 – Guggenheim Fellow
- 2006 – CAREER Award, Cognitive Neuroscience
- Fellow, Association for Psychological Science
