= TV Lab at Thirteen/WNET =

TV Lab (short for Television Laboratory) was a program founded at Thirteen/WNET public television station in 1972 by David Loxton with support from the Rockefeller Foundation and New York State Council on the Arts. The program provided artists with advanced video making equipment through an artist-in-residence program. Between 1975 and 1977, the Video Tape Review series was established and broadcast through TV Lab. David Loxton created TV Lab's Independent Documentary Fund in 1977, aiming to provide funding for the creation of independent documentaries. Unable to match funds from the National Endowment for the Arts, the IDF and TV Lab lost support, eventually ending in 1984.

== History ==
In 1971, the Rockefeller Foundation donated $150,000 for the establishment of TV Lab. At the time, Howard Klein was assistant director at the Rockefeller Foundation and played an instrumental role in the Rockefeller Foundation's decision to donate to TV Lab at Thirteen/WNET, working with WGBH's Fred Barzyk and artist Nam June Paik, among others. Initially, John Jay Iselin, WNET's president at the time, suggested Robert Kotlowitz for the role of TV Lab director, but artists involved in the project expressed discontent with the proposal. Barzyk then suggested David Loxton for the position of Director, and in 1972 TV Lab began under Loxton's direction with additional grants from the New York State Council on the Arts.

Between 1972 and 1974, TV Lab primarily operated through an artist-in-residence program, supporting artists in the creation of video art. Nam June Paik, Dimitri Devyatkin, Ed Emshwiller, Shirley Clarke, and Douglas Davis were among artists who participated in the artist-in-residence program during this initial period. In 1973, TVTV video collective came to Loxton seeking support for a guerrilla video project about guru Maharaj-Ji and his followers at the Houston Astrodome. This became TV Lab's first video documentary, Lord of the Universe, marking the beginning of TV Lab's venture into non-fiction video.

In 1975, the Video Tape Review (VTR) series hosted by Russell Connor was established as part of TV Lab, airing until 1977. VTR was used to introduce viewers to artists at TV Lab and provide some exposure to their work, and in its two years, featured the work of artists and video collectives including Jon Alpert and Keiko Tsuno, TVTV, Broadside TV, and Video Freex. In 1977, David Loxton created the Independent Documentary Fund (IDF) at TV Lab, founded by the Ford Foundation and National Endowment for the Arts. The IDF provided funds for independent documentaries such as Jack Willis' Paul Jacobs and the Nuclear Gang and Robert Epstein's The Times of Harvey Milk.

In 1984, TV Lab lost funding from the Corporation for Public Broadcasting when Program Fund Director Lewis Freedman did not renew CPB funds, and TV Lab was unable to match required funds from the National Endowment for the Arts.

== Productions ==
Between 1972 and 1984, several artists and video collectives produced work at TV Lab.

- Nam June Paik - Global Groove (1973), A Tribute to John Cage (1973), Nam June Paik: Edited for Television (1975), You can't lick stamps in China (1978), Media Shuttle: Moscow/New York (1978) (collaboration with Devyatkin)
- Ed Emshwiller - Crossings and Meetings (1974), Sur Faces (1977), Dubs (1978)
- Douglas Davis - Video Against Video (1975)
- Dimitri Devyatkin - Media Shuttle: Moscow/New York (1978) (collaboration with Paik)
- Bill Viola - Junkyard Levitation (1976), The Space Between the Teeth (1976), Songs of Innocence (1976), Truth Through Mass Individuation (1976), The Wheel of Becoming (1977), The Morning After the Night of Power (1977), Sweet Light (1977), The Reflecting Pool (1979), Moonblood (1979), Silent Life (1979), Anthem (1983)
- Joan Jonas - I Want to Live in the Country (And Other Romances) (1976), Double Lunar Dogs (1984)
- Gary Hill - Soundings (1979)
- Skip Blumberg - Pick Up Your Feet: The Double Dutch Show (1981)
- John Sanborn - Exchange in Three Parts (1977), Resolution of the Eye (1979), Olympic Fragments (1980)
