= Ernest Bormann =

Ernest Gordon Bormann (July 28, 1925 – December 27, 2008) was Professor Emeritus in the Department of Speech-Communication at the University of Minnesota. He received his B.A. from the University of South Dakota in 1949 and earned his M.A. and Ph.D. from the University of Iowa in 1953. His doctoral thesis was on the analysis of radio speech delivered by former Louisiana senator Huey Long.

Bormann proposed the Symbolic Convergence Theory of human communication, which emphasizes the sharing of group "fantasies" (creative interpretations) as a method of developing shared meaning. Furthermore, he is the author of numerous books and articles.

== Publications ==
- Bormann, E. G. (1972). Fantasy and rhetorical vision: The rhetorical criticism of social reality. Quarterly Journal of Speech, 58(4), 396–407.
- Bormann, E. G. (1980). Communication theory. New York: Holt, Rinehart & Winston.
- Bormann, E. G. (1980). The paradox and promise of small group communication revisited. Central States Speech Journal, 31(3), 214–220.
- Bormann, E. G. (1982). Fantasy and rhetorical vision: Ten years later. Quarterly Journal of Speech, 68(3), 288–305.
- Bormann, E. G. (1985). The source of fantasy: Restoring the American dream. Carbondale, IL: Southern Illinois University Press.
- Bormann, E. G. (1985). Symbolic convergence theory: A communication formulation. Journal of Communication, 35(4), 128–138.
- Bormann, E. G. (1990). Small group communication: Theory and practice (3rd ed.). New York: Harper & Row.
