= Grégory Chatonsky =

Artist

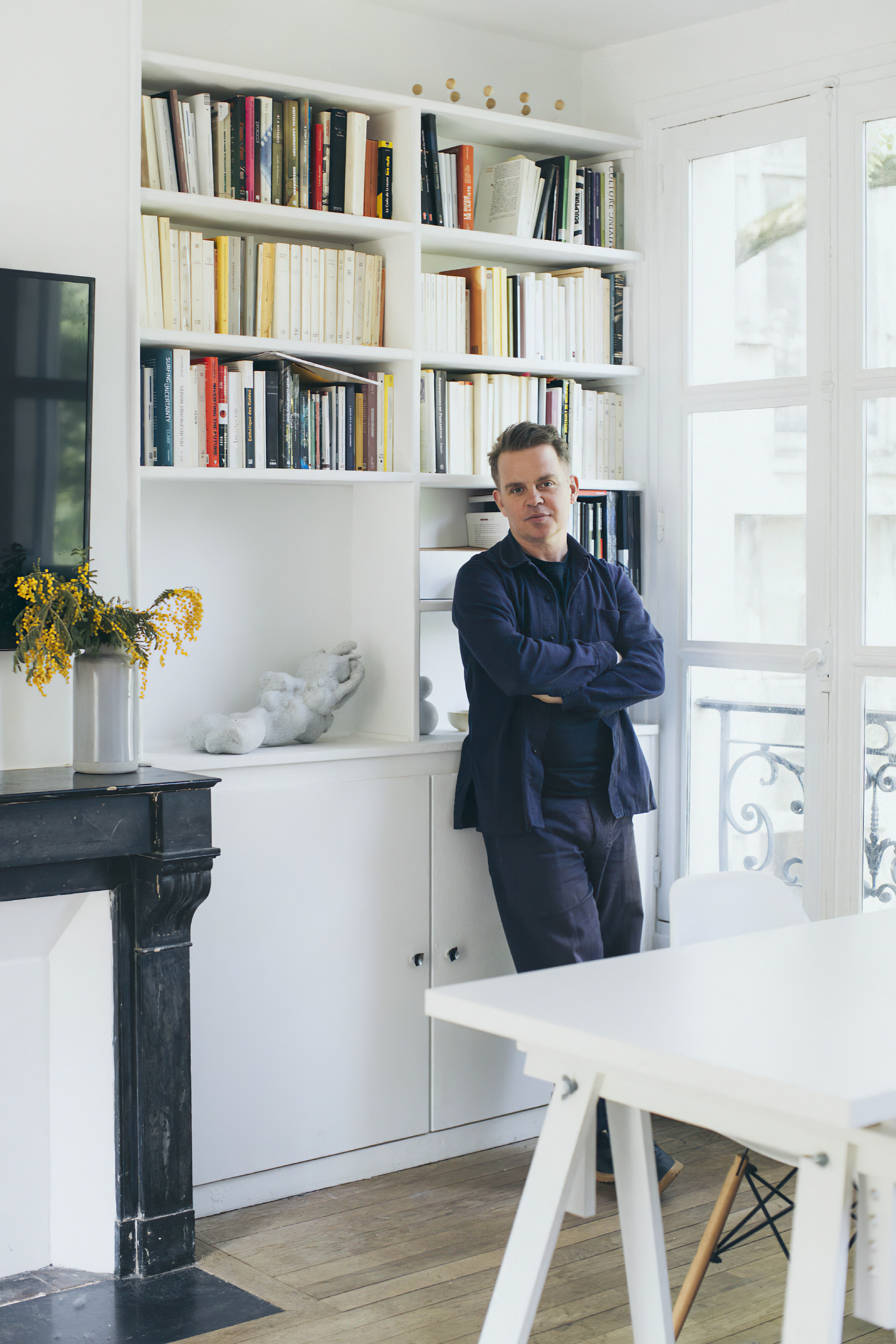
- Grégory Chatonsky
- Born: May 4, 1971 (age 55); Paris (France)
- Occupations: Artist and writer
- Movement: Internet art Netart Postdigital Photography Installation art

Grégory Chatonsky (May 4, 1971) is a French and Canadian artist who works with interactive installations, networked devices, photographs and sculptures. He explores the relationship between technologies and affectivity creating new forms of fiction.

== Early life and education ==
After completing studies in Visual Arts and Philosophy at La Sorbonne Pantheon-Sorbonne University, Grégory Chatonsky began his master's degree at the ENSBA and at ENST finishing in 1999. In March 2016 he was awarded his PhD from Université du Québec à Montréal for his dissertation: Aesthetics of flows (after digital).

== Work ==
Grégory Chatonsky is one of the early practitioners of Internet art having founded in 1994 incident.net, an Internet art collective exploring the notions of the accidental, the glitch and unpredictability. During this early period of internet he created the website of Centre Georges Pompidou. From 1994 to 1997, Chatonsky, researched, wrote the screenplay and produced the CD-ROM, Mémoires de la Déportation, about deportations and the Holocaust in France. From the mid-nineties Chatonsky produced films, audios and code-based work for the internet, including Counter (1995), a website that existed solely to count visitors, 2fresh (1997), a snippet of HTML script, and La Vitesse du Silence (1999), a netart performance piece.

Produced at the C³ Center for Culture & Communication Foundation (with Reynald Drouhin) and at Biennale d’art contemporain de Montréal, Revenances (1999) was an online performance work that invited the viewer to slow down their browsing and consider glitches and pauses as spaces where "ghosts" may interact.

In 2003, he became interested in the themes of ruins and the materiality of digital flows. In 2009, he ventured into the world of artificial intelligence, which he renames artificial imagination, which became over the years an object of research and creation. He wrote the first French language novel co-written with a modified version of GPT-2. Chatonsky divides his time between France and Canada. He has taught at Le Fresnoy-Studio national des arts contemporains, France, at Université du Québec à Montréal’s School of visual and media artn he is artist-researcher at École Normale Supérieure in Paris and teacher of artificial imagination in EUR Artec.

== Bibliography ==
- Boutet de Monvel, Violaine (2008) "La destruction comme point de départ à une sémiotique libérée". Paris Art.
- Couchot, Edmond (2007). Des images du temps et des machines dans les arts et la communication. Éditions Jacqueline Chambon-Actes Sud. Paris. ISBN 978-2-7427-6940-7.
- Doyon, Frédérique (11 October 2007) "Le septième art de demain" Le Devoir, Montréal.
- Fan, Ruan (28 April 2015) "French artist explores future archeology". China Daily. Beijing
- Lechner, Marie (15 April 2014) "Entretien croisé entre l’artiste Grégory Chatonsky, concepteur de Capture, et le musicologue Peter Szendy". Libération. Paris
- Miguirditchian, Julie (2010) "Artist in the flow". Digitalarti Mag
- Mufson, Beckett (15 May 2015) "Here Are Imaginary Fossils from a Post-Human Earth". The Creators Project
- Murphy, Jay (2009) "A fiction without narration", thing.net
- Palmiéri, Christine (2013) "Fossilisation du futur", Archée
- Popper, Frank (2006) From Technological to Virtual Art. MIT Press. Boston
- Thome de Souza, Kevin (25 March 2014) "Grégory Chatonsky’s Capture: generative art pushed to its limits". Amusement. Paris
- Denson, Shane (2020) "Discorrelated Images", Duke University Press
- Cavanna, Aurelie (october 2021) "Grégory Chatonsky, a realism without reality", Art Press. Paris
- Larsonneur, Claire (2021) "Challenging the Selfie: Perfect Skin by Chatonsky", Interfaces : Jeux de Formats
- Somaini, Antonio (2022) "On the altered states of machine vision. Trevor Paglen, Hito Steyerl, Grégory Chatonsky", N-ICON. Studies in Environmental Images
- Cavanna, Aurelie (2022) "Gregory Chatonsky : Capturing imaginations", Art Press. Paris

== See also ==
- Generative art
- Artificial intelligence art
