= Château de Ranrouët =

Castle in Loire-Atlantique, France

Coordinates: 47°26′40″N 2°17′56″W

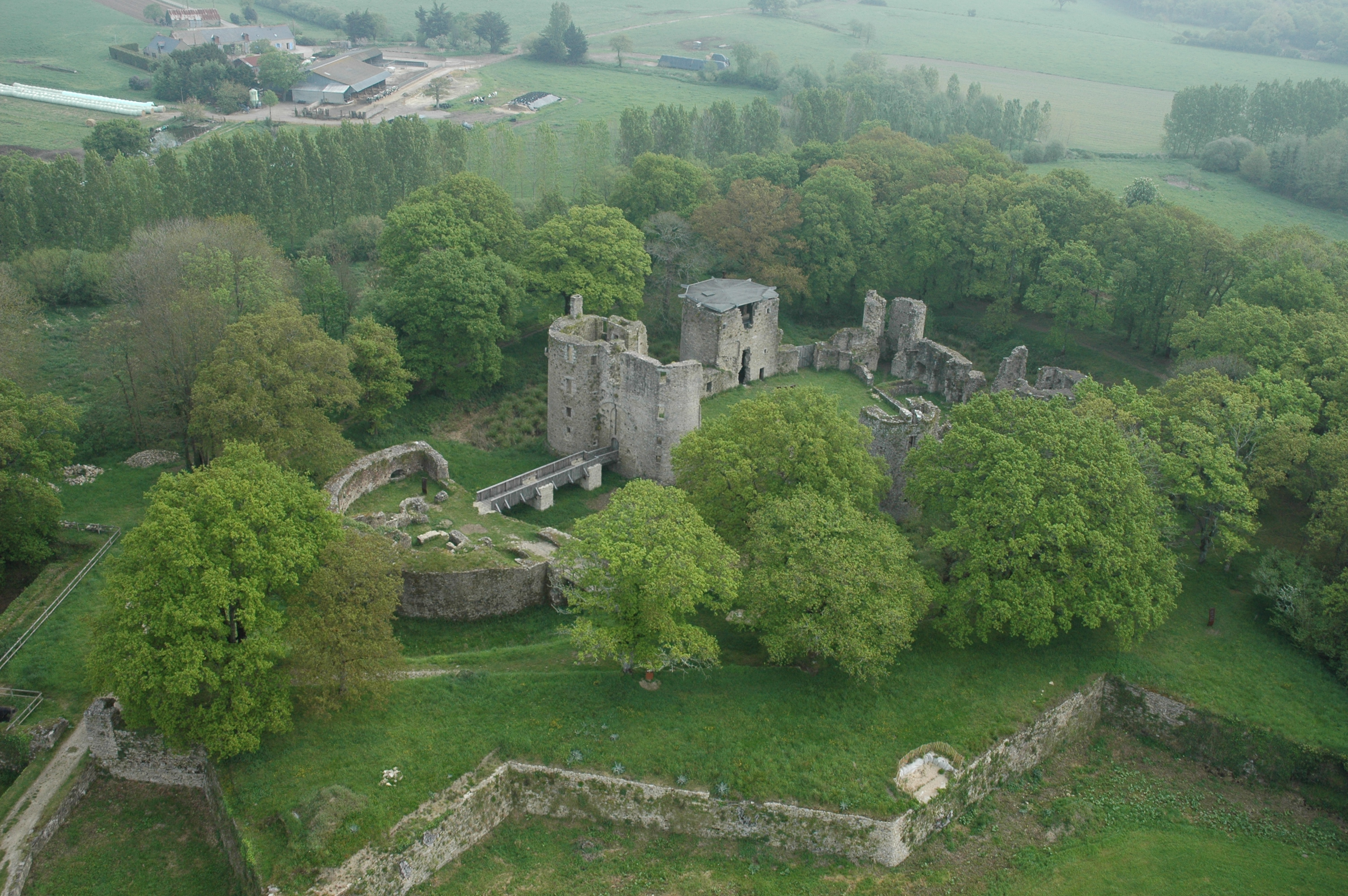
Château de Ranrouët

The Château du Ranroët is a castle existing since the 12th century, located in Herbignac in the Loire-Atlantique department of France. Since 1925, the Château du Ranroët has been listed as a monument historique by the French Ministry of Culture.

== Gallery ==
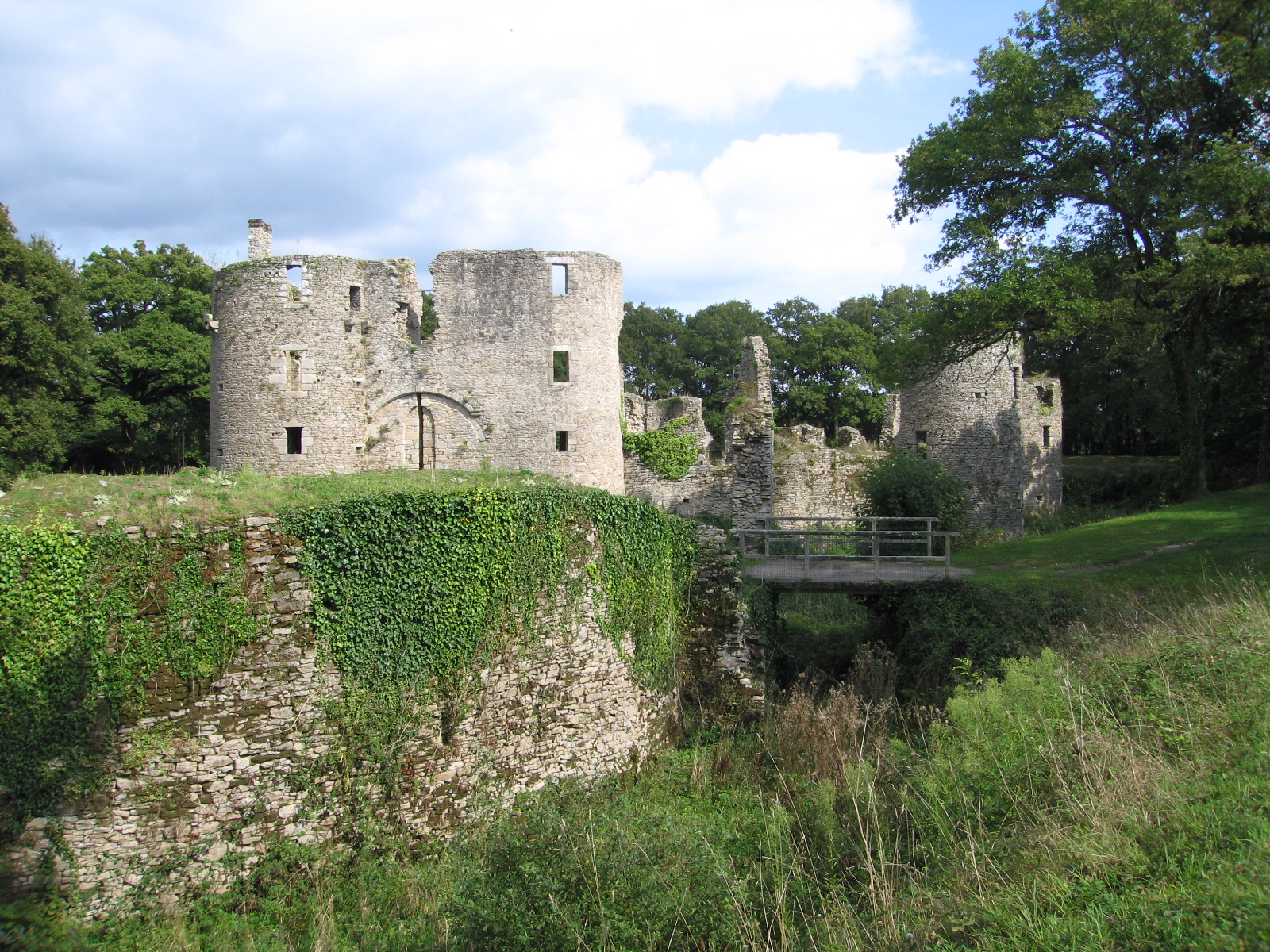
Entrance of the castle

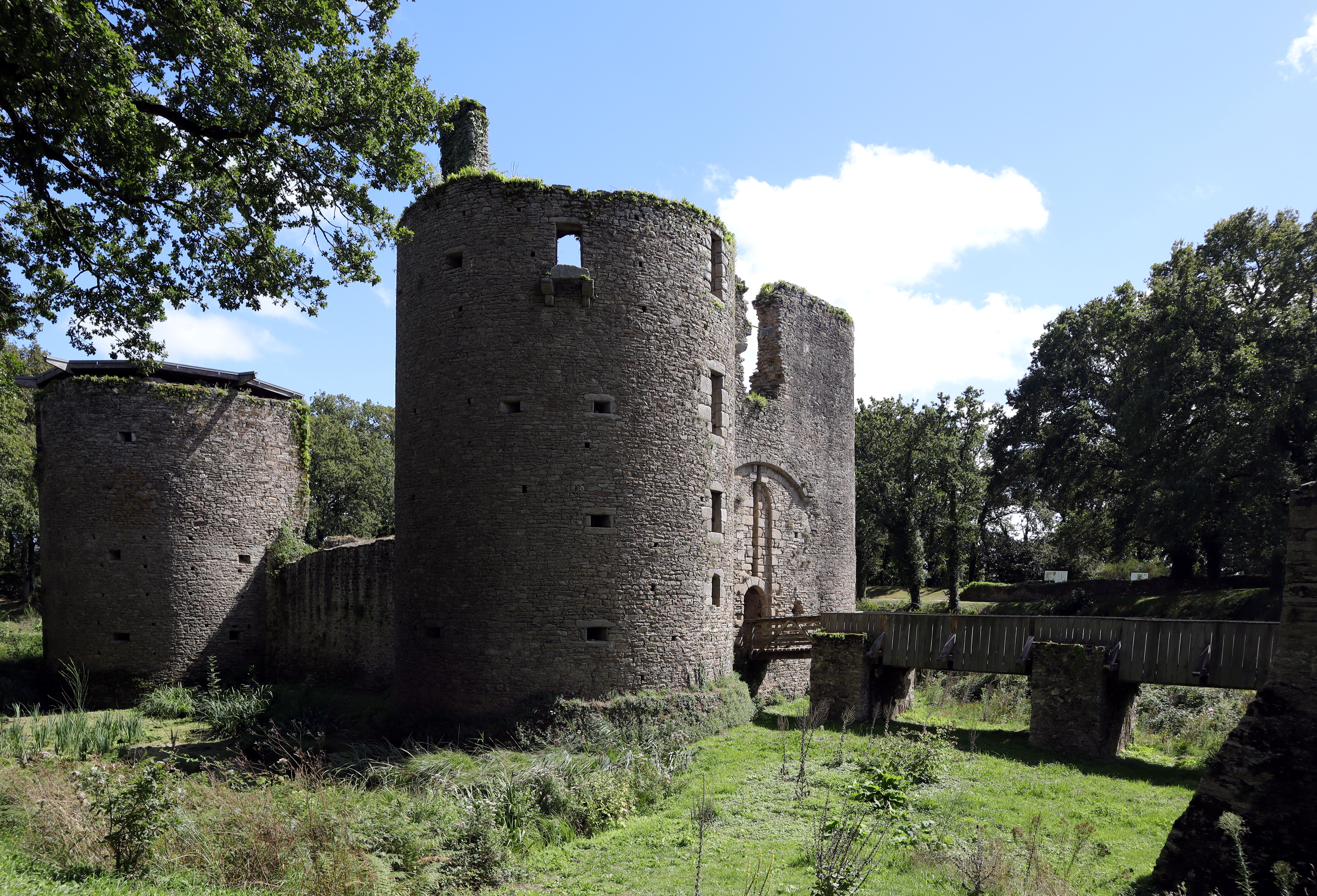

== See also ==
- List of castles in France
