= Casoria Contemporary Art Museum =

Museum in the Province of Naples, Italy

- Interactive map of the Casoria Contemporary Art Museum area

General information
- Location: Via Duca D'Aosta 63, Casoria, Province of Naples, Italy
- Coordinates: 40°54′51″N 14°17′55″E

Website
- casoriacontemporaryartmuseum.com/en

Casoria Contemporary Art Museum is located in Casoria in the Province of Naples, Italy. In 2003 the comune approached Antonio Manfredi, a local artist and advocate of international contemporary art, as part of an initiative of local revitalization under the banner Una città per l'arte. The museum was founded in 2005 and has an exhibition space of 3,500 m^{2}, largely devoted to its permanent collection of some thousand works by international artists. In April 2012 the museum began burning its collection in protest at the impact of austerity measures introduced in response to the nation's debt crisis, which have had a particularly adverse effect on arts funding.

== See also ==
- Iconoclasm
