= Symbolic convergence theory =

Communication theory

Symbolic convergence theory (SCT) is a communication theory developed by Ernest Bormann proposing that the holding of fantasies in common transforms collections of individuals into cohesive groups. SCT offers an explanation for the appearance of a group's cohesiveness, consisting of shared emotions, motives, and meanings. Through SCT, individuals can build a community or a group consciousness which grows stronger if they share a cluster of fantasy themes. Symbolic convergence theory provides a description of the dynamic tendencies within systems of social interaction that cause communicative practices and forms to evolve. This theory allows theorists and practitioners to anticipate or predict what will happen and explain what did happen. One thing SCT does not do is allow for control of human communication. It attempts to explain how communication can create and sustain group consciousness through the sharing of narratives or fantasies.

To foster this cohesiveness, dramatizing or using fantasy stories are significant types of communication involved in SCT. SCT explains that meanings, emotions, values, and the motives for action are in the communication contexts by people trying to make sense out of a common experience. It explores the human tendency of trying to understand events in terms of the people involved, who have certain personality traits and motivations, and have agency over how the events unfold. SCT was first proposed by Ernest Bormann in the Quarterly Journal of Speech in 1972.

Bormann and his colleagues at the University of Minnesota introduced SCT as a framework for discovering, describing, and explaining the dynamic process by which humans come to share symbolic reality. Bormann defines the basic communicative dynamic of symbolic convergence theory as, "the sharing of group fantasies which bring about symbolic convergence for the participants" (p. 4). It is a process through which collectives create and share a consciousness and develop a common symbolic reality.

Symbolic Convergence Theory is related to attribution theory in that it deals with the human tendency to attribute meaning to signs and objects in order to make sense of them. The process of symbolic convergence resembles empathic communication.

SCT has a three-part structure:

1. elucidation of the recurring forms of communication involved in a shared group consciousness
2. illustration of why group consciousness begins, rises, and is maintained
3. explanation of the process of how an individual begins to share (or stops sharing) a common symbolic reality

== Anatomy ==
=== Dramatizing ===
Dramatizing messages involve members introducing brief examples of humor, wordplay, and figures of speech (metaphor, simile) or elaborate analogies, fables, narratives, stories, or other creative expressions. Dramatized messages explain events that happened elsewhere or in the past or might occur in the future within the group. When in a group, someone cracks a joke, describes a movie, or starts discussing plans for the weekend or vacation. Dramatized messages help the speaker and listener make sense of a confusing situation or clarify an uncertain future.

==== Fantasy themes ====
Unlike the traditional ideas of what fantasy means, Bormann uses the word to refer to "the creative and imaginative interpretation of events that fulfills a psychological or rhetorical need." Fantasy themes are used to construct a rhetorical vision or to dramatize messages embraced by the whole group. They are the means through which interpretation is accomplished through communication. SCT isn't concerned with finding the truth but with the reaction from the group when these fantasies are shared. Most of the time, these fantasies trigger a chain reaction within the group where they will contribute more and more to the conversation or fantasy. Bormann sees these fantasy themes fulfilling a psychological or rhetorical need through creative and organized interpretations of events.

Fantasy themes are broken down into the following three forms:

1. Setting themes depicting where either the action takes place or where the characters act out their roles
2. Character themes describe the agents or actors in the drama, assigning qualities and motives to them, implying that they have specific characteristics
3. Action themes or plot lines dealing with the action of the drama.

==== Symbolic cues ====
A symbolic cue is a word, phrase, slogan, or nonverbal sign or gesture that triggers previously shared fantasies and emotions. Images, symbols, dramatizations, and narratives can draw people into a shared symbolic world. An example of a symbolic cue would be a bumper sticker, which actuates the observer into a larger shared reality. Symbolic cues can heighten a group's cohesiveness.

==== Fantasy types ====
A fantasy type is a fantasy theme that has currency across many rhetorical visions. By providing known references, they help make sense out of a new phenomenon.

An example of a fantasy type would be when Richard Nixon was campaigning in his home state of California in 1952. Some wealthy Southern California businessmen put a fund together on behalf of Nixon. The newspapers picked this up and ran headlines such as "Secret Rich Men's Trust Fund Keeps Nixon in Style Far Beyond His Salary." The purpose of this fund was to help Nixon pay for expenses he could not otherwise pay for out of his income. National newspapers were two to one in favor of dropping Nixon from the ticket after this, and his only hope was to find a way to regain public trust and support. Six days after the crisis, Nixon addressed the public by radio to respond to the charges against him. A fantasy theme emerging from this story would be Nixon presenting himself as the American dream. During his speech over the radio, he emphasized how he made his own way in the world and had to work for a living. He also said, "How does a candidate pay for political expenses not covered by the government? First is to be a rich man, which I am not. I feel it is essential in our country that a man of modest means can run for President." He offers autobiographical references, allowing him to appear as the average man. This is an appropriate fantasy theme because it develops a response to the allegations that he is not a rich man who is getting money from everyone but a hard-working man who started from the ground and worked upwards.

==== Saga ====
A saga is the telling and re-telling of the accomplishments and events in the life of an individual, group, organization, or larger entity such as a nation. For instance, examples of American sagas include "the spirit of entrepreneurship" and "the power of the ballot box." Symbolic convergence theorists argue that the Soviet Union had difficulty maintaining the cohesion of the fifteen republics due to the weakening of the communist rhetorical vision and dwindling sagas.

=== Structural concepts ===
==== Rhetorical vision ====
A rhetorical vision is a composite drama that unifies people in a shared symbolic reality.

A rhetorical vision has five elements:

1. Dramatis personae – the actors and players who give life to the rhetorical vision
2. Plotline – provides the action of the rhetorical vision
3. Scene – details the location of the rhetorical vision
4. Sanctioning agent – legitimizes the rhetorical vision
5. Master analog – the reflection of a deeper structure within the rhetorical vision

=== Critical evaluation concepts ===
==== Shared group consciousness ====
A shared group consciousness must exist within a rhetorical community for a fantasy theme to chain out, a rhetorical vision to develop, a saga to exist, or a symbolic cue to imbue meaning. Some terms that portray a shared group consciousness are common ground, mutual understanding, created social reality, meeting of minds, and empathic communication. Once a group has reached shared group consciousness, they no longer think in terms of "I" or "me" but in terms of "us" and "we." After all, communication is the drive that allows groups of people to move toward their goals. A shared group consciousness also reduces uncertainty by allowing groups to develop an identity that shapes their culture. Shaping their own culture can influence norms, roles, and even decision-making.

==== Rhetorical vision reality link ====
A rhetorical vision reality link allows for a viable rhetorical vision that includes an authentic account of the phenomena and tangible evidence. The lack of a rhetorical vision reality link, with no clear observational impressions of the facts, may lead to disprovable fantasies characterized by rumor, innuendo, gossip, and even paranoia.

==== Fantasy theme artistry ====
Fantasy theme artistry is the rhetorical ability to present situations in a form that appears attractive to people so that they will share them. By presenting situations in a form that appears attractive to an audience, or showing that you have an understanding of the stories that group shares, you can speak to their stories and turn their opinions into your favor.

== Life cycle ==
=== Stage 1: Emergence or creation ===
A dramatic event or series of events leads to uncertainty and a need to develop rhetoric to explain the current state of reality. In the case of the Cold War, the emergence of a fantasy vision was necessary after Stalin's speech clarified his belief that capitalism and communism were incompatible and that war was inevitable. With the Truman Doctrine speech, emerging fantasies of Red Fascism (e.g., communism vs. democracy), Power Politics (e.g., containment strategy), and the Hot War vision (e.g., make the world safe for democracy), crystallized into the yet unknown concept of "the Cold War."

=== Stage 2: Consciousness-raising ===
Fantasies begin to chain out among a collectivity of people over a common interest. As they co-create a new vision, their lives take on new meaning and emotion, and their behavior changes. The principle of critical mass, when a rhetorical vision begins a period of rapid growth, is central to consciousness-raising. Also key to this stage is the principle of dedication, which asserts that when planned events inspire individuals to act according to the key emotions present in the rhetorical vision, their consciousness is raised.

=== Stage 3: Consciousness-sustaining ===
At this stage, communication is focused on maintaining the commitment of people who have shared the rhetorical vision. The principle of shielding asserts that visions often remain fundamentally unchanged by containing motivation to quash counter messages. The principle of rededication asserts that visions may be sustained through severe criticism of counter-rhetoric and strategic positive dramatizations to maintain the visions' vitality. The principle of reiteration asserts that rhetorical visions may be sustained by restating the key fantasy themes and types in new manners that fit within the dramatic structure of the vision, along with framing new information within the old rhetorical forms to maintain explanatory power.

=== Stage 4: Vision-declining ===
Situations in a rhetorical community can change so rapidly that the vision cannot adapt successfully. The principle of explanatory deficiency asserts that when a rhetorical vision loses its explanatory power, it begins to decline. Another possible reason for the decline is explained by the principle of exploding free speech where a deluge of counter-rhetoric follows a significant period of censorship. Along similar lines, the principle of resurfacing competitive rhetorical visions asserts that competition from alternate rhetorical visions increases with opened channels of communication.

=== Stage 5: Terminus ===
The end of a rhetorical vision. The principle of rapid implosion asserts that an inflexible rhetorical vision will not decline incrementally but will implode on itself when the combination of problems, inability to explain the rapid change, and contradictory motives become too much for the vision to deal with.

== Real world uses ==
Symbolic Convergence Theory has been used to study movements such as the Puritans, the Knights of Columbus, American communism, and the Women's movement. It has been used to study political visions such as the Cold War, the New South, and Vietnam War decision making, amongst others.

The Cold War rhetorical vision allowed theorists to mesh findings of previous SCT studies to discern, understand, and explicate more fully the intricate life-cycle of a rhetorical vision. Therefore, one set of studies written by Bormann and others recommended that rhetorical visions can encompass the gamut of shared consciousness from all parts of the political, social, artistic, military, economic, and cultural spectrum. Basically, this study on the Cold War shows how unrelated rhetorical visions may be combined into a masterful rhetorical vision providing rhetorical continuity over time.

The SCT is vastly used in mass media. The mass media is one of the vital sources for determining and creating fantasy themes. Reporting and repeating keywords, images, or phrases in the media helps create specific political fantasy themes among the electorate. Some rhetorical visions and fantasies become national fantasies, such as the stream of patriotism after the September 11, 2001, terrorist attack. The demand for the American flag increased immensely.

SCT can also be applied in corporate strategic planning through guiding corporate positioning, market segmentation, and advertising and sales message testing. There are relevant cases consolidating the SCT theory-method-message complex combining with the strategic planning process and other implications.

== Criticism ==
Ernest G. Bormann, the theorist behind Symbolic Convergence Theory and a past professor of communication at the University of Minnesota, claimed that SCT is both an objective and interpretive theory. The methods of determining fantasy themes, types, and visions create a humanistic approach that is interpretive. SCT is often praised and even considered a bit unusual because it meets both criteria for being both objective and interpretive. Ernest G. Bormann, John F. Cragan, & Donald C. Shields responded to initial criticisms in 1994. Bormann noted that SCT lacked one point to predict and control human communication in 1982.

Em Griffen puts forward arguments that Symbolic Convergence Theory is an objective theory. Symbolic Convergence Theory is objective because it focuses on sharing group fantasies that create symbolic convergence, which is framed as a universal principle that holds true for all people regardless of the time, culture, and communication context. Below are six tests that can be interpreted for SCT objectively.

1. A good objective theory explains what occurs and why it happens. This theory gives a great explanation of what makes sense for a group discussion and how. It can help us make sense of a chaotic group discussion when group members speak at once or go off on verbal tangents. However, Boston College communication professor James Olufowote doesn't believe Bormann's explanation goes far enough. In a sympathetic critique aimed at improving the theory, he contends that "SCT does not sufficiently explain why humans are predisposed to dramatizing reality and sharing fantasy in the first place. Although SCT covers most of this critique, Bormann says, "SCT does not sufficiently explain why humans are predisposed to dramatizing reality and sharing fantasy in the first place."
2. A good objective theory predicts what's going to happen. SCT achieves this portion of qualifying to be an objective theory. SCT can predict that symbolic convergence will also occur when a fantasy chain erupts among members. Without this chain eruption, there will not be cohesiveness within the group. Although SCT can predict fantasies will happen, it cannot predict when dramatizing message will trigger a chain reaction. Bormann compared SCT as similar to Darwin's biological theory of evolution in that respect. The theory even suggests that there will be no cohesiveness without shared fantasies. An evolutionary theory can explain how modern humans evolved but cannot predict the further path of evolution. SCT involves a group consciousness through time and describes the dynamic forces that explain discovered communication patterns but not when they will happen.
3. A good interpretive theory clarifies people's values. SCT highlights the values of rhetorical community by creating a common ground, meeting of minds, and empathic communication. This theory does not explain what happens when someone ignored is left out or excluded from the group because people don't mesh well when ignored.
4. A good interpretive theory offers a new understanding of people. The SCT method does a great job of directing rhetorical critics to focus on symbolic language. Fantasy theme analysts focus on the rhetorical visions within varied communities, such as a feminist critique looking for patterns of male dominance and how pro-eating disorder messages influence those in that community.
5. The SCT illustrates that all group members have equal power and access to creating and chaining fantasy themes. Olufowote (2006) argued that dramatic messages and rhetorical visions are not power-neutral but help to benefit influential members of the group. Most of the rhetorical vision community is influenced by the one with more power in the group or maximum imaginary capability to expand the fantasy messages.
6. The SCT describes that the rhetorical community is portrayed as conflict-free, and differences between them are overlooked in theory. But in reality, in the more prominent groups, individuals can often dissent with others or the themes themselves. In regarding this, the theory is not acceptable to much organizational communication.

In 2003 Joshua Gunn delivered a sophisticated criticism of what he considered Bormann's outdated conception of SCT involving a humanist construct of conscious human actors working with an agency. In contrast, Gunn proposed a post-modernist construct working in an unconscious and critiqued Bormann's work as a passing era before Michael McGee took rhetorical study onto issues of ideology. Bormann, Cragan, & Shields responded the same year refuting or dismissing Gunn's criticisms. A supporting argument that SCT is a measure of conscious human agency can be seen in the intentional use of rhetoric to create a crafted convergence of a group's perceptions by a religious advocacy group to address a specific problem.

== Why Symbolic Convergence Theory is practical ==
These stories, or fantasies, can help businesses, corporations, or politicians direct positive and negative feedback to those in power. Because SCT is a general theory built on the method of natural sciences, it can be applied to many different cultures and timelines. It has been used to account for the communicative processes, created by a group, used to foster the creation and sustenance of the group's so-called "consciousness." Below are a few points of how and why SCT can be useful in everyday situations.

Determining communication malfunctions. A question that often happens within SCT is, "Why do some fantasy themes spark a chain of sharing while others fail?" Groups' fate as a part of a group has common experiences that predispose them to share fantasies that relate to their concerns. Therefore, these groups will have successful fantasy chains because they have more in common and can share more. When power, sexism, role conflict, social rejection, and other touchy topics come into play, group members often find the direct confrontation of such issues unsettling. These fantasy chains may begin but often do not last very long.

Assessing communication efforts and persuasive campaigns. This theory can provide insight within small groups, meetings, lectures, and speeches, but it provides a greater use of assessing effects within the media. It is most heavily used within political campaigns. In the 1976 campaign, the investigators included the relationship between the media messages and the audience effects in their study. These studies analyzed the extent to which participation can anticipate voting behavior. By being able to predict voting behaviors, political representatives could carefully craft their messages for different groups of people before giving their speeches and lectures to best benefit themselves.

The role of consciousness. Within fantasy chains, three phases keep the chains going. They are consciousness-creating, consciousness-raising, and consciousness-sustaining. In the first phase, people come to create a commonality among their group. If the groups share this common fantasy, consciousness-raising will often fall in line next. And lastly, the two first points combined will create a sustaining fantasy chain that will last.

== A Dangerous Phenomenon ==
An important element of Symbolic Convergence Theory is the propensity of the phenomenon it illustrates to be used against the public good. SCT can be seen at work in revisionist history, whether unintentionally or intentionally. The intentional malevolent use of SCT principles against the public good can be seen in the rash of "Fake News" campaigns in which false perceptions are fed to society in order to create a false, but widely believed, consensus (convergence) of belief. This is tantamount to intentionally creating false representation on the walls of Plato's cave.(See Plato's Allegory of the Cave above) Conversely, unintended convergence of negative social ideas are illustrated by Jonathan Haidt describing the formation of American social and political tribalism.

== Similar Theories ==
Dramatism (Burke)

Dramatism is an attempt to understand the world through the construct of drama. The Dramatism construct allows the analyst to give purpose to life by giving individuals agency as actors within the drama, ties events and locations into the perception of the world as a stage. As all stories have a plot, Dramatism gives existence and humanity purpose. Dramatism provides groups of individuals with conceptual tools to build a convergent social perception of reality.

Social Judgement Theory (Sherif, Sherif and Hovland)

A self-persuasion theory is defined by the perception and evaluation of an idea by comparing it with current attitudes. Persuasion occurs at the end of the process when a person understands a position and then compares the position it advocates the other person’s position on the issue. The closer the other person’s position comes to a person’s latitude of acceptance, the that position will seem closer than it is

Social Exchange Theory (Thibaut and Kelley)

The major force in interpersonal relationships is the satisfaction of both people's self-interest. Self-interest is not necessarily bad and can enhance relationships. Interpersonal exchanges are analogous to economic exchanges where people are satisfied when they receive a fair return on their expenditures.

Social Construction of Communication Technology (Fulk)

Communication technology use is influenced by workgroup attitudes and behaviors. Social influence is greater when individuals are more attractive to their work group.

Fantasy Theme Analysis (Bormann)

This theory is a form of rhetorical criticism. It takes the shared fantasies of a group of people, perhaps the audience for a business presentation or a public speech, and examines them for inside jokes and other cues to a shared consciousness.
