= The City and Horses =

American indie pop band

The City and Horses is an American indie pop band formed in Brooklyn in 2008. The members include flutist Domenica Fossati, drummer Chris Wirtalla, bassist Matt Manhire, lead guitarist Shane Connerty, synth/sax player Nikki D'Agostino, and singer/songwriter Marc Cantone. Their debut album, I Don’t Want to Dream, was released by White Shoe Records in 2009. They were later signed to American label Paper Garden Records in 2010. The band has released four albums to date.

Their song "I Miss It All" was featured in Charlyne Yi and Michael Cera’s indie film Paper Heart

== Members ==
Current members

- Marc Cantone – singer & composer
- Domenica Fossati – flautist
- Chris Wirtalla – drummer
- Matt Manhire – bassist
- Shane Connerty – lead guitarist
- Nikki D'Agostino – synth & sax

== Discography ==
Studio albums

- Ruins - Paper Garden Records (2017)
- Strange Range - Paper Garden Records (2013)
- We Will Never Be Discovered - Paper Garden Records (2011)
- I Don’t Want to Dream - White Shoe Records (2009)

Extended plays

- I Don't Want to Make You Sad (EP) ( 2023)

== Music videos ==
- Re-Inking (2015)
- Pretty Pretty (2014)
- May I Love Someone Soon (2013)
- 17 (2013)
- This Is Manhattan (2012)
- War Paint (2012)
- Dum Dee Dum – feat. Katie Costello (2011)
- We Will Never Be Discovered (2011)
- I Don't Want to Dream (2009)
- A Thousand Lashes (2009)
