= Electronic Arts Intermix =

American non-profit arts organization

Electronic Arts Intermix (EAI) is a nonprofit arts organization that is a resource for video and media art. An advocate of media art and artists since 1971, EAI's core program is the distribution and preservation of a collection of over 3,500 new and historical video works by artists. EAI has supported the creation, exhibition, distribution and preservation of video art, and more recently, digital art projects.

EAI supports artists through the distribution, preservation, exhibition and representation of their media artworks, and works closely with educators, curators, programmers and collectors to facilitate exhibitions, acquisitions and educational uses of media artworks. EAI provides access to video art within an educational and cultural framework.

== History ==
EAI was founded in 1971 as one of the first nonprofit organizations in the United States dedicated to the support of video as an art form. As one of the earliest organizations in the emergent video art movement, EAI was created to provide an alternative system of support for this nascent art form and the artists engaged with it. In 1973 EAI opened an Artists Videotape Distribution Service.

=== Howard Wise ===
EAI was founded by Howard Wise, an art dealer and supporter of video as art. From 1960 to 1970, the Howard Wise Gallery on 57th Street in New York was a locus for kinetic art and multimedia works that explored the nexus of art and technology. The gallery featured several groundbreaking exhibitions, including On the Move (1964), Lights in Orbit (1967), and TV as a Creative Medium (1969). Seeking to create new paradigms to support artists working in the nascent video underground, Wise closed the gallery in 1970 to found the nonprofit organization Electronic Arts Intermix. The founding mission was to support video as "a means of personal and creative expression and communication.

=== Editing and Post Production Facility ===
In 1972, EAI began the Editing/Post Production Facility in response to a need for a creative workspace and equipment access for artists. This facility was one of the first nonprofit services of its kind in the U.S., and enabled the creation of many seminal video works, by artists including Mary Lucier and Joan Jonas. The facility has served thousands of artists and organizations with low-cost access to analogue and digital technical facilities.

=== Artists' Videotape Distribution Service ===
In 1973, the Artists' Videotape Distribution Service was founded to answer a need for a new paradigm for the dissemination of artists' video works, apart from the conventional gallery system. Many artists of that time were drawn to the utopian notion of a medium that was easily reproducible and therefore democratic and widely accessible. Videotapes were distributed in unlimited editions at relatively low prices. Created around a core of seminal video artists, including Peter Campus, Juan Downey, and Nam June Paik, this service remains the oldest existing distributor of artists' video. In 1986, the EAI Preservation Program began as a way to facilitate the restoration and archiving of works in the EAI collection.

== Collection and Public Services ==
=== Collection ===
The EAI collection spans the mid-1960s to the present. The works in the collection range from seminal videos by pioneering figures — such as Nam June Paik, Bruce Nauman, Martha Rosler and Joan Jonas — to new digital works by emerging artists, including Seth Price, Paper Rad, Cory Arcangel and Takeshi Murata. Through EAI's Artists Media Distribution Service, the collection is made available for screenings, exhibitions and acquisitions to museums, collectors, and educational, arts and cultural institutions.

In September 2011 an exhibition commemorating the 40th anniversary of Electronic Arts Intermix, Circa 1971: Early Video and Film from the EAI Archive, opened at Dia:Beacon. The exhibition, curated by current EAI Executive Director Lori Zippay, featured early video works by Joan Jonas, Nam June Paik, and Ant Farm.

=== Public Resources ===
EAI provides an art historical and cultural framework for the collection, with related activities that include extensive online resources, educational initiatives, and public programs. In recent years artists such as Dan Graham, Joan Jonas, Paper Rad, Charles Atlas, Carolee Schneemann, Nancy Holt, Shana Moulton, Cory Arcangel, JODI, Kalup Linzy, Lawrence Weiner and Tony Oursler have participated in artists' talks and performances at EAI. In addition to these public programs, EAI's viewing room is open o the public for free viewing of works in the collection. In addition to the EAI collection, the organization published two online resource guides on the current industry standards for display, preservation, and collection of media art.

== Artists ==
Below is a list of a few of the artists included in the EAI collection.

- Marina Abramović
- Peggy Ahwesh
- Vito Acconci
- Ant Farm
- Eleanor Antin
- Cory Arcangel
- Charles Atlas
- John Baldessari
- Phyllis Baldino
- Michael Bell-Smith
- Lynda Benglis
- Bernadette Corporation
- Joseph Beuys
- Dara Birnbaum
- John Cage
- Sophie Calle
- Seoungho Cho
- Tony Cokes
- Cecelia Condit
- Jaime Davidovich
- Cheryl Donegan
- Forcefield
- Terry Fox
- General Idea
- Jean-Luc Godard
- Dan Graham
- Gary Hill
- Nancy Holt
- Ken Jacobs
- JODI
- Joan Jonas
- Stanya Kahn
- Mike Kelley
- Ken Kobland
- Shigeko Kubota
- George Kuchar
- Kalup Linzy
- Mary Lucier
- Chris Marker
- Gordon Matta-Clark
- Cynthia Maughan
- Paul McCarthy
- Ana Mendieta
- Charlotte Moorman
- Muntadas
- Takeshi Murata
- Jayson Musson
- Bruce Nauman
- Dennis Oppenheim
- Tony Oursler
- Nam June Paik
- Charlemagne Palestine
- Raymond Pettibon
- Seth Price
- Paper Rad
- Radical Software Group (RSG)
- Pipilotti Rist
- Martha Rosler
- Carolee Schneemann
- Robert Smithson
- Ryan Trecartin
- Valie Export
- Bill Viola
- Andy Warhol
- David Wojnarowicz
- Bruce and Norman Yonemoto
