= Single-channel video =

Single-channel video is a video art work using a single electronic source, presented and exhibited from one playback device. Electronic sources can be any format of video tape, DVDs or computer-generated moving images utilizing the applicable playback device (such as a VCR, DVD player or computer) and exhibited using a television monitor, projection or other screen-based device. Historically, video art was limited to unedited video tape footage displayed on a television monitor in a gallery and was conceptually contrasted with both broadcast television and film projections in theatres. As technology advanced, the ability to edit and display video art provided more variations and multi-channel video works became possible as did multi-channel and multi-layered video installations. However, single-channel video works continue to be produced for a variety of aesthetic and conceptual reasons and the term usually now refers to a single image on a monitor or projection, regardless of image source or production.

== History ==
Artists began working with video technology in the 1960s. The earliest works used television sets as sculptural objects but by the late 1960s video recorders became readily available and artists began experimenting with the potential to record performances and conceptual works addressing the medium itself and critiquing broadcast television and commercial film. As more artists worked with video as a medium the problem of exhibition arose. Not being able to project the image as with film, the playback of video tapes was left to monitors placed in galleries and alternative art spaces. Theoretically and commercially, the video tape created problems as tapes were easily duplicated, with no "original" (although a master did usually exist). Video cooperatives and distribution centres emerged following the experimental film model. Unlike film, however, the gallery became the primary venue for video art. As multiple channels became possible, artists continued to work in single-channel, exhibiting in a number of venues beyond the gallery and the term single-channel video has expanded from a video tape played back on a monitor to any work produced from a single electronic source or, in fact, any work consisting of a single moving image regardless of source. Single-channel works that are produced explicitly for playback on a monitor are primarily concerned with narrative or directly addressing the audience rather than providing an immersive experience found in installation works.

== Notable single-channel video works ==
- Double Vision (1971), Peter Campus
- Television Delivers People (1973), Richard Serra
- Birthday Suit – with scars and defects (1974), Lisa Steele
- Semiotics of the Kitchen (1975), Martha Rosler
- Kiss The Girls: Make Them Cry (1979), Dara Birnbaum
- Reverse Television (1983), Bill Viola
- Me & Rubyfruit (1989 or 1990), Sadie Benning
