= Yonemoto =

Yonemoto (written: 米元 or 米本) is a Japanese surname. Notable people with the surname include:

- Bruce and Norman Yonemoto, American installation artist
- Koharu Yonemoto (米元 小春; born 1990), Japanese badminton player
- Takuji Yonemoto (米本 拓司; born 1990), Japanese footballer
