= Kiss the Girls =

Kiss the Girls can refer to the following:

- A modified line from the nursery rhyme "Georgie Porgie"
- Kiss the Girls (1965 film), a Greek film
- Kiss the Girls (novel), a 1995 James Patterson novel
  - Kiss the Girls (1997 film), a film adaptation of the novel
- "Kiss the Girls" (Lioness), a 2026 television episode

== See also ==
- Kiss the Girls and Make Them Die, a 1966 Italian/American film
- Kiss The Girls: Make Them Cry, a 1979 video art piece
- "Kiss the Girl", a 1989 song
