= You are the product =

You are the product may refer to:

- Television Delivers People, a 1973 short film known for the recurring phrase "You are the product of t.v.".
- "You Are the Product" (Reputation Economics), a 2015 book by Joshua Klein
- "You Are the Product", a 2017 essay by John Lanchester
- "If you don’t pay for it you are the product", a 2018 article by Margaret McCartney
- The Social Dilemma, a 2020 film known for the phrase "If you're not paying for the product, you are the product"

== See also ==
- Attention economy
- Surveillance capitalism
