= Semiotics of the Kitchen =

Video art piece by Martha Rosler

- Screenshot from Semiotics of the Kitchen
- Directed by: Martha Rosler
- Release date: 1975
- Running time: 6 min.
- Country: United States
- Language: English

Semiotics of the Kitchen is a feminist parody single-channel video and performance piece released in 1975 by Martha Rosler. The video, which runs six minutes, is considered a critique of the commodified versions of traditional women's roles in modern society.

== Scenario ==
Featuring Rosler as a generic cooking show host, the camera observes as she presents an array of kitchen utensils. After identifying them, she demonstrates unproductive, and sometimes violent, uses for each. It uses a largely static camera and a plain set.

Letter by letter, Rosler navigates a culinary lexicon, using a different kitchen implement for each step along the way. She begins with an apron, which she ties around her waist, and, with deadpan humor, journeys through the alphabet, until the last few letters. For these, U, V, W, X, Y, and Z, the implements are dispensed with and Rosler's gestures and body become a signal system themselves. The Z replicates the mark of Zorro, a filmic reference. At the end of the entire work, the artist offers a shrug, somehow defusing the negative reading of the parody. The focus on linguistics, semiotics, and words is important, since Rosler intended the video to challenge "the familiar system of everyday kitchen meanings -- the securely understood signs of domestic industry and food production."

== Meaning ==
A well-known feminist, Rosler remarked about this work that "when the woman speaks, she names her own oppression." The symbolic terminology of the kitchen, she hypothesized, transforms the woman into a sign of the system of food production and harnessed subjectivity. The video subject is an "anti-Julia Child," Rosler explains; she "replaces the domesticated 'meaning' of tools with a lexicon of rage and frustration." The work was intended, like all early video, to be shown on a television monitor, and thus it is no accident that some of the gestures represent a tossing or throwing of the imaginary contents of certain implements "outside the box" of television programming. It is not the production of food in and of itself that is Rosler's target but the taken-for-granted role of happy housewife and selfless producer that the tape intends to spotlight. Her gestures demonstrate frustration with the language of domesticity, as she uses the domestic space of the kitchen as a backdrop for resistance and change.
