= Edin Velez =

American film director

- Born: Arecibo, Puerto Rico
- Known for: Video Art, Director

Edin Velez is a Puerto Rican video artist, director and professor. He is best known for his work on the documentary films State of Rest and Motion and Dance of Darkness.

== Life and career ==
Edin was born and raised in Puerto Rico and is currently based in New York. He studied painting at the University of Puerto Rico and the Institute of Puerto Rican Culture. He moved to the US in the early 1970s and became part of the first generation of video artists working in SoHo, Manhattan. His directorial debut documentary film on Japanese Butoh, Dance of Darkness, was broadcast nationally in the US by PBS. He is a professor and coordinator of the video program at Rutgers University–Newark.

Edin has received numerous award, including American Film Institute's Maya Deren Award, fellowships from the Guggenheim Foundation, the U.S./Japan Friendship Commission, the Jerome Foundation and the New York State Council on the Arts.

== Selected exhibitions ==
Edin's work has been featured in numerous group exhibitions in such institutions as the Whitney Museum of American Art, Centre Georges Pompidou, documenta 8, American Film Institute National Video Festival, Museum of Modern Art and International Center of Photography.

== Filmography ==
Year	Film	Director	Cinematographer	Notes
2017	State of Rest and Motion	✓	✓	Editor and producer
2012	My Brooklyn	✗	✓	
2009	Never Enough	✗	✓	
2009	RFK in the Land of Apartheid	✗	✓	
2007	A Certain Foolish Consistency	✓	✓	Producer
2002	This and That, and other Minor Misunderstandings	✓	✗	Editor and producer
1995	Memory of Fire	✓	✗	
1992	Art on Film, Program 3: Form	✓	✗	
1990	A Mosque in Time	✓	✓	
1989	Dance of Darkness	✓	✓	Museum of Modern Art
1987	Meaning of the Interval	✓	✓	Museum of Modern Art
1984	AS IS	✓	✓	
1984	Oblique Strategist	✓	✓	
1981	Meta Mayan II	✓	✓	Museum of Modern Art
1978	TULE	✓	✓	Museum of Modern Art
