= Maya Deren Award =

Historical Independent Film Award

The American Film Institute Award for Independent Film and Video Artists, subtitled and generally known as the Maya Deren Award, was an award presented to filmmakers and video artists by the American Film Institute to honor independent filmmaking. Named for the avant-garde experimental film artist Maya Deren, it was given from 1986 through 1996.

== History ==
Created by the American Film Institute in 1985, the Maya Deren Award was first presented on January 30, 1986, at the Tower Gallery in Manhattan, New York City. The inaugural recipients were video artist Nam June Paik, experimental filmmaker Stan Brakhage and animator Sally Cruikshank. The initial co-chairpersons of the AFI's committee for the award were two board members, actress Marsha Mason and independent film exhibitor Karen Cooper.

The award included a $5,000 honorarium.

== Recipients ==
- 1986: Nam June Paik, Stan Brakhage, Sally Cruikshank. Presented January 30, 1986.
- 1987: Dara Birnbaum, Robert Breer, Ed Emshwiller
- 1988: Bruce Conner, Yvonne Rainer, Bill Viola. Presented February 3, 1988.

Citation given to J. Hoberman, film critic for The Village Voice, for contributions to independent film and video.

- 1989: James Broughton, Shirley Clarke, Joan Jonas
- 1990: Les Blank, Ernie Gehr, Edin Velez
- 1991: Bruce Baillie, Charles Burnett, Trinh T. Minh-ha. Presented at the Angelika Film Center.
- 1992: George Kuchar, Marlon Riggs, Steina Vasulka
- 1993: Julie Dash, Pat O'Neill, Bruce and Norman Yonemoto
- 1994: Ken Jacobs, Barbara Kopple, Julie Zando
- 1995: Richard Leacock Victor Masayesva, Shigeko Kubota
- 1996: Kenneth Anger, Leslie Thornton, Chick Strand
