= Phyllis Baldino =

American visual artist

Phyllis Baldino (born 1956) is an American visual artist whose art engages in a conceptual practice that merges performance art, video art, sculpture, and installation in an exploration of human perception. Her single-channel videos are distributed by Electronic Arts Intermix in New York, NY. She currently lives and works in Brooklyn, New York.

== Biography ==
Baldino earned a BFA in sculpture from the Hartford Art School in Connecticut. She has taught at New York University, and conducted workshops at the Royal Danish Academy in Copenhagen, Denmark; the Malmö Art Academy in Sweden; and the Statens Kunstakademi in Oslo, Norway.

She has given lectures throughout the U.S. at major institutions, including Rhode Island School of Design in Providence; Pratt Institute in Brooklyn, New York; Bemis Center for Contemporary Arts, Omaha, Nebraska; Parsons The New School in New York; the Art Institute of Chicago, Chicago, Illinois; and Art in General, New York.

In 2001 and 1996, Baldino was a finalist for an international media / art award at the Center for Art and Media Karlsruhe / Sudwestrundfunk and International Video Arts Award (respectively) in Baden-Baden. In 2011 and 1999, she was an Artist-in-Residence at the Wexner Center for the Arts, Ohio State University, Columbus, Ohio; and in 2005, at the Experimental Television Center, Newark Valley, NY. She has received grants from the New York State Council on the Arts (NYSCA), Jerome Foundation, Art Matters Inc., and the California Community Foundation.

== Work ==
Baldino explores the intangible boundaries between the material and metaphysical world by mounting large-scale video installations, which address perception, memory, and scientific phenomena. Ironically approaching the medium of video, her topics include quantum physics, parallel universes, nano-technology, and fuzzy logic. Many of her installations have also been presented as single-channel videos.

With April 1994: The Gray Band (1994) Baldino asked Los Angeles musicians Dez Cadena, Lynn Johnston, Tom Watson, and Mike Watt to reassemble instruments, including a microphone, metal clarinet, sawed-up guitar, and bass, and then asked them to play "I Will Survive," which she then recorded on video. In In the Present (1996), Baldino was inspired by William James' temporal definition of the present, which can only occur in a span of time ranging from three to 12 seconds. Within this definition, Baldino ties time to perception by offering 50 discrete experiences of information in the present time – with videos ranging in time from three to 12 seconds each – but using the viewer's memory to account for the links between the videos.

Baldino's 2011 video Suitcase / Not Suitcase / Suitcase, is an excerpt from her 1993 "Gray Area" series that was shown in Times Square on the MTV Screen on April 13–19, 2011, for the 40th Anniversary of Electronic Arts Intermix, New York. During the presentation, Baldino walked anonymously through the square with the suitcase. In 2023, selections from Baldino’s “Gray Area” series were included in the exhibition Perpetual Screw, focusing on the representation of tools in visual arts, at International Objects, Brooklyn, displayed alongside the objects depicted in her videos.

== Exhibitions ==
Baldino has had solo exhibitions at Lauren Wittels Gallery, New York (1995, 1996); Thomas Nordanstad Gallery, New York (1996); Pierogi, Brooklyn (2001); Contemporary Arts Center, Cincinnati (2001); Threewalls, Chicago (2005); Wexner Center for the Arts, Columbus, Ohio (2011); Studio 10, Brooklyn (2013).

She has participated in group exhibitions at a number of international institutions, including the Museum of Modern Art, New York; Museum of Contemporary Art, Chicago; Whitney Museum of American Art, New York; Stedelijk Museum, Amsterdam; Dia Center for the Arts, New York; Guggenheim Museum Soho, New York; P.S. 1 Contemporary Art Center, New York; Air de Paris, Nice; Four Walls, New York; Los Angeles Center for Photographic Studies; and Independent Art Space, London.

== Screenings and Festivals ==
Her work has also been included in numerous national and international film and video festivals, including the Impakt Festival (2002, 2001, 1999), the New York Video Festival (2002), the International Short Film Festival Oberhausen (2001), media_city seoul (2000), the World Wide Video Festival (2000, 1998, 1996), Documentary Fortnight (2006), Oberhausen Film Festival (2012), Videoformes (2018, 2020, 2021) and Prismatic Ground (closing night, 2022).

== Select Videography ==
Multi-Channel Video Installations
Year	Title	Length
1994	April 1994: The Gray Band (5-channel)	various
1996	In the Present (2-channel)	13 min.
1998	Nano-cadabra (4-channel)	5:08 min.
1999	Color without Color (15-channel)	18:50 min.
2001	16 minutes lost (2-channel)	16 min.
2002	about symmetry symmetry about (2-channel)	various
2005	Out of Focus Universes (4-channel)	various
2006	Mars/Rome/NY De La Warr (2-channel)	various
2013–2016	Nothing from the Future (9-channel)	27:23 min.
2019	u_n_d_e_r_w_a_t_e_r (3-channel)	6:38 min.

Single-Channel Videos
Year	Title	Length
1993-94	Gray Area Series (21 pieces)	various
1993	Venice in Berlin in Venice	5:35 min.
1994	Same Shoes	14:11 min.
1994-96	Unknown Series (excerpts)	25 min.
2000	Room 1503 in a row	6:05 min.
2003	ParaUniVersesVersesVerses	various
2003	BALDINO-NEUTRINO	80:51 min.
2006-10	Out of Focus Everything Series (40 pieces)	various
2010-11	Absence is Present Series (4 pieces)	various
2011	Battleship Potemkin: Father & Son	6:47 min
2011	Monet’s Atelier	5:35 min.
2011	Suitcase/Not Suitcase/Suitcase	2:43 min.
2011	Spamhead	11:36 min.
2011	Absence is Present: MayJuneJuly	various
2017	Now is Here	18:58 min.
2020	run the gamut	2:56 min.

== Selected bibliography ==
Arning, Bill. "Phyllis Baldino, ‘In the Present,'" Time Out, December 12–19, 1996: 41.

Kandel, Susan. “Timing,” Los Angeles Times, February 3, 1994.

Molon, Dominic. Sympathy for the Devil: Art and Rock and Roll Since 1967, Chicago: Museum of Contemporary Art, 2007.

Myers-Schecter, Jessica. “Quantum/Conceptual: Phyllis Baldino Explores Scientific Phenomenon,” Fringe Underground, 2006.

Obermark, Peter. “Baldino Films Explore Human Perceptions,” Cincinnati Enquirer (July 15, 2001).

Schmerler, Sarah. “Phyllis Baldino, ‘Nano-cadabra,’” Time Out (March 4–11, 1999): 180.

Smith, Roberta. “The Resurging Video, Reclaimed and Reoriented,” New York Times, February 21, 1997: C23.

Spaid, Sue. “Phyllis Baldino, ‘Nano-cadabra,’” art/text, no. 66 (August–October 1999): 94-95.

Williams, Gregory. Phyllis Baldino at Pierogi, Artforum, no.9 (May 2001): 179.
