= Technology/Transformation: Wonder Woman =

1978–1979 video art work by Dara Birnbaum

Technology/Transformation: Wonder Woman is a video by Dara Birnbaum made in 1978–1979 that takes as its subject the appropriation of gendered imagery as rendered by popular culture television. The video has color and stereo sound, with a run time of 5 minutes, 50 seconds.

== Synopsis ==
The video opens with a barrage of explosive imagery along with an audio track of a siren taken from the 1970s television series Wonder Woman. The following scenes are fast-paced repeated shots from Wonder Woman, with several scenes following of actress Lynda Carter as the main character Diana Prince, performing her transformative spin from secretarial role into superhero role.

The juxtaposition of Diana Prince as secretary to Diana Prince as superhero stands to expose the multiplicity of identities through mediated surfaces and "points to gender as a subject to an image chain of reproductions." Footage of Diana Prince spinning into becoming Wonder Woman in varying landscapes (near trees, in a room of mirrors, in the outdoors) are repeated throughout the run of the video and are accompanied by 1970s funk soundtrack. The representation of repeated transformations expose the illusion of fixed female identities in media and attempts to show the emergence of a new woman through use of technology. The use of repetition and mimicry that Birnbaum employs throughout Technology/Transformation: Wonder Woman mirrors and re-stages television's technical procedures. The video ends with a scene of repeating explosions that precedes a blue background with white text that scrolls upwards, delivering a transcription of lyrics to the song "Wonder Woman Disco" (1978) by The Wonderland Disco Band.

== Reception and discussion ==
Birnbaum's use of deconstructed television footage to make Technology/Transformation: Wonder Woman has been noted for its potential criticism of television and its modalities. The video's reception at time of release read as a "paragon of feminist critique", in opposition to mass media's gendered stereotypes. Technology/Transformation: Wonder Woman has remained relevant, however, as its fast-paced, repetitive aesthetic with a woman subject resonates with contemporary aesthetics. The video's reception shifted from one of subversive deconstruction towards an affirmative image making of the female body. Another way the video constructs positive body politics is through its representations of the male figure juxtaposed with the woman. In an interview with BOMB magazine from 2009, Birnbaum says: "...A purposeful strategy that I have not talked about previously, [and that] is the image of men included in works…. In Wonder Woman she meets a guy who is really timid; he hides behind a column and she defends him. In Drift of Politics, any time a man enters into the frame, the shot goes white. There's an inability to deal with the presence of a man interfering with or occupying space." Birnbaum not only scopes the affiramtion of the female body, but "highlights Wonder Woman's indentity as unfix and transient" displaying how technology has the capabilities to better understand this character and misconstrued representations of women and their role in the home, society, or pop culture. The display of a white screen after a man appears, is in fact a protest and encouragement that women do not need to be paired with a male counterpart in the media and can stand alone as individual characters.

Through Technology/Transformation: Wonder Woman's tightly controlled environment of appropriated images, sequence, mimicry, and popular music of the current time, Birnbaum uncovers television's "repertoire of freakishly artificial expressions" and mass media's identity formation methods.
