= Double Vision (1971 video) =

Double Vision is one of the earliest and best known video works by American (born 1937) artist Peter Campus. Running 14 minutes and 22 seconds, it is a single channel video created with two video cameras fed through a mixer, providing the effect of a photographic double exposure. The video is divided into seven parts, each referencing a phenomenal mode of perception or form of biological sight. Each part utilizes a different configuration of the video cameras to record the interior of a small loft space. It opens with the title Double Vision superimposed over a photograph of a fundus (the back layer of the retina) taken through an ophthalmoscope. Campus described the video as "an exploration of double or two-camera images, relating to the evolution of sight in animals. The tape begins with an uncoordinated two-camera image and works its way up to an eye-brain model, always conscious of how this model differed from its subject matter." Campus's contemporary Bill Viola wrote in Art in America: "Unlike many of his contemporaries who used the surveillance camera as a detached, fixed observer documenting the performer’s actions, Campus assigned an active, independent ontological status to the camera eye." The room the video takes place in has also been said to take on the role of subject. Campus said in 2003, "When I was young I made myself a prisoner of my room. It became part of me, an extension of my being. I thought of the walls as my shell. The room as a container had some relationship to the imaginary space inside a monitor."

== Chapters ==
=== 1. Copilia ===
The two cameras pan wildly around the room in dizzying combinations, resulting in confusing juxtapositions of images. Objects such as a chair, window, and plant come in and out of view.

Copilia are copepods with a unique visual system that has been compared to a television camera. R.L. Gregory describes the creature's eye as "a single channel scanning eye, like a simple mechanical television camera, feeding information of spatial structure down a single neural channel in time." Each of Copilia's two eyes consists of a pair of lenses, with a large anterior lens and smaller posterior lens. The posterior lens engages in "continual and lively motion, apparently moving across the image plane of the anterior lens," "transmitting spatial information by conversion into a time-series by scanning, as in television." Copilia does not have a retina, rather the posterior lens is connected to "a single functional receptor unit, transmitting its information to the central brain down a single pathway." Campus's video cameras playfully mirror this biological system: a camera pans wildly for each posterior lens, as the information it captures is transmitted along a single cable into the mixer.

=== 2. Disparity ===
The two cameras are positioned next to each other and move as a unit, panning slowly through the room. They rotate at times, and capture the floor and ceiling in addition to objects in the room. There is a slight horizontal discrepancy between the images captured by each camera, and as the camera-unit rotates, the individual images rotate around a central point.

In vision, binocular disparity is the difference between two retinal images. This disparity serves as the basis for stereopsis, one of the most important depth cues in human sight. In Campus' video, however, the two disparate images are mixed on a single monitor, rendering stereoscopic perception of the image impossible.

=== 3. Convergence ===
The cameras are positioned next to each other at waist height. They point down the length of the room and the combined image shows two widely disparate views. Campus walks down the length of the room, and the viewer sees two images of his body doing so. He walks back to the cameras and adjusts them, rotating one slightly inward and then the other. As he walks down the room again, the two images of him are much closer together. At a point close up to the cameras, the images converge to make a single image of his body. He again approaches the cameras and turns them further inward. As he walks the length of the room this time, the images of his body are much closer together. The point where they appear as one is far away, at the other side of the room, indicating that he did not only rotate the cameras inwards, but also may have inadvertently moved them closer together.

In vision, convergence is a term signifying the ability of the eyes to turn inward, typically used to focus on objects that are close up. Convergence reduces the disparity of these objects to zero. This is why on the second iteration of Campus's walk we see a single image of his body when he is close to the camera and a double image when he is further away. On the third iteration, had he perfectly rotated the cameras further inward, the point of convergence would be located even closer to the camera. The imperfection in his process has been said to underscore the difference between the mode of sight performed by the cameras and human perception.

=== 4. Fovea ===
The two images are combined in a new way. In the center of the screen Campus's body is silhouetted by a spotlight. He is holding a video camera and slowly rotates his upper body, panning the camera around the room. The overlaid image takes up the entire screen and noticeably corresponds to the camera Campus is holding in the center image, although it is zoomed in quite far. Campus initially points the camera outside the window (this is the only moment where the outside is visible in detail: a neighbor's brick window) then continues to pan around the room. Because the camera is zoomed in, the image moves jerkily.

In vision, the fovea is the center of the retina. It has the highest concentration of cones and no rods. Significantly, it produces the highest visual acuity and serves as the center of fixation, only registering a small part of the visual field. Campus's use of zoom mirrors the small section of the world the fovea has access to. Additionally, the circular spotlight silhouetting Campus in the center of the screen references the circular fovea. At this point in the video, the camerawork is no longer tied as directly to the mechanics of human perception as it was before, but uses technological means to reference biological sight, relocating it outside of the body. In the upcoming sections, configurations becomes further divorced from the human sensory apparatus, imagining new possibilities for sight.

=== 5. Impulse ===
One camera pans throughout the room, while the other is fixed on what appears to be an oscilloscope screen. The first camera scans through light and dark areas of the room, while the graph on the screen is visibly responsive to the light levels detected by the first camera. The shot no longer mimes biological sight, but imagines the possibility of machinic sight. This new sight, now divorced from a mimetic relationship to the body, compels the viewer to consider the relationship between human and machinic vision.

=== 6. Fusion ===
The two cameras are on opposite sides of the room, initially at an oblique angle to each other. Campus walks back and forth between them, gradually adjusting them so that they face each other. The combined image shows him walking away from and towards the viewer at the same time. This section introduces a sense of space not yet seen, and highlights technology's potential to extend the human sensory apparatus.

=== 7. Inside the Radius ===
For the first time, the image is not mixed like a photographic double exposure. Campus places a small CRT monitor in the foreground and walks behind it. The image on the monitor perfectly matches up to the background, creating the illusion that the monitor is an empty frame. The illusion is subverted, however, when Campus walks behind the monitor and disappears. The image on the monitor then begins to shift. It pauses on a patch of sunlight coming in from the window onto the floor, as well as other sections of the floor and wall, making a full rotation before stopping on the original illusionistic image. Campus walks off camera and the video ends. This effect has been said to compel the viewer to consider their own relationship to the monitor, where machinic and biological sight form a dialogical relationship that leads to the question of what sight really is and can be.

== Sound ==
The sound in the video consists of a mixture of noises coming from inside and outside of the room, as well as the hum of the videotape itself. Sounds coming from inside are mostly the sounds of Campus walking and shuffling about. Outside, sounds such as cars driving and honking and dogs barking can be heard.

== Appropriation ==
In 2011, Katherine Lee created the online work Quadruple Vision, the title a reference to Campus's Double Vision. She writes, "If "double vision" is to the self and its surroundings, then "quadruple vision" is to phenomenal self - phenomenal surroundings - digital surroundings - digital self."

== See also ==
- List of American films of 1971
