= Reverse Television =

Reverse Television is a series of 44 video portraits made by American video artist Bill Viola in 1983, originally produced for broadcast television and later documented as a 15-minute video. These portraits depict people throughout Boston sitting in their living rooms, silently staring at the video camera as though it were a TV set. The portraits were meant to fit into space normally occupied by television commercials and as such to "interrupt the continuity of the undifferentiated flow of the television picture, giving viewers the possibility of pondering their own position facing the screen."

== Background ==
"Reverse Television" was first broadcast by WGBH-TV In an interview with Raymond Bellour, Bill Viola describes the compromises he had to negotiate through in the making and initial distribution of "Reverse Television." Originally, Viola wanted the video portraits to be presented once every hour for a two-week period in one-minute segments with "no label, no title, or anything" attached to them. Viola claims that such a long duration, as well as an absence of identifying information, was crucial to the piece, since the work was meant to be a disruption of the normal viewing experience of television.

WGBH-TV, wishing to keep broadcasting costs low, wanted to show the portraits in 15-second segments. The station also refused to broadcast the videos without a title, requesting that Viola include a full description of the piece at the beginning of each clip. In a confrontation with the station director, Viola ultimately agreed to show the clips in thirty-second segments with text at the end of each clip stating his name and the date.

== Video Summary ==
The 1984 documentation of the project begins with text describing the project:

REVERSE TELEVISION is a project for broadcast television. A series of portrait recordings were made of people sitting in their homes, staring in silence at the camera.

Forty-four portraits were made in the Boston area with subjects ranging in age from 16 to 93 years old. Ten continuous minutes were recorded with each person. An unbroken one-minute segment of this material was to be broadcast.

The portraits would be shown each hour of the broadcast day as image inserts between programs. They would appear unannounced, with no titles before or after, and the series would run for several weeks.

WGBH TV Boston presented REVERSE TELEVISION from NOV. 14-28, 1983. They chose to air the portraits for 30 seconds each, showing them 5 times a day.

The following is a series of 15-second excerpts from all of the portraits. They are presented in the order they were recorded and represent documentation of this project.
