= Television Delivers People =

1973 video

Television Delivers People is a 1973 short video made by video artist Richard Serra and Carlota Fay Schoolman. Running just short of 7 minutes in English, it is a single channel video art piece. The two artists bought some airtime to broadcast the piece to the public in 1973. To the soundtrack of canned, conventional elevator music, electronically generated text scrolls over the screen in yellow font with a blue background. This format of text and the successful use of minimal video technology gives the feel of a "spare low-budget appearance, as if it were an information bulletin, or a pre-programme transmission on a community TV channel or cable network. Because of this minimal 'look', the tape clearly originates from 'outside' the broadcast TV environment, therefore deconstructing not so much the form of television programming but rather the broadcasting's overall strategy".

The text of this piece of video art is a critique of mass media and pop culture as a control tactic and social construct. Video Data Bank's bio on the video explains how the work shows the mass media's assertion of itself onto mass culture through things called 'entertainments' for the benefit of the mass corporations and those in power. It opens with "Television delivers people to an advertiser.". A recurring phrase throughout the monologue is "You are the product of t.v.", for example:

It is the consumer who is consumed.

You are the product of t.v.

You are delivered to the advertiser who is the customer.

He consumes you.

The text asserts that the corporations behind television broadcasting are manipulative forces working to maintain the status quo, from which they gain power and profit from. The text goes on to delve into how the public viewer is shaped and formed by corporations and television. It describes the manipulative control and the motivations of the advertisers and corporations that become ingrained in television. The analysis of political and ideological functioning of television directly confronts the viewer of this piece. The film "goes further than simply critiquing broadcast television, extending its scope to target the role of television networks and beyond to the large corporations that control them and the political state they represent".

By using the medium that Schoolman and Serra are inherently critiquing, by "using television, in effect, against itself—(they) employ a characteristic strategy of early, counter-corporate video collectives—a strategy that remains integral to video artists committed to a critical dismantling of the media's political and ideological stranglehold". The video tears apart the masquerade of commercial television, revealing television as "little more than an insidious sponsor for the corporate engines of the world". The use of minimalistic technology and its stark appearance of this short video works to "strip away any pretense of 'entertainment' or even news or documentary, opting for a direct appeal to the mind and emotions of the viewer... The work is effective not simply because of the message conveyed via the text, which through coherent persuasive argument outlines the relationship between television entertainment, news and information, the maintaining of the status-quo and corporate and political control, but also of the direct televisual power of its form".

Television Delivers People is available on Surveying The First Decade: Volume Two: Video Art and Alternative Media in the U.S. by Video Data Bank. It is in Program 7: Critiques of Art and Media as Commodity and Spectacle. This volume includes works by other video artists including Proto Media Primer by Paul Ryan and Raindance Foundation (1970), About Media by Anthony Ramos (1977), Fifty Wonderful Years by Optic Nerve (1973), Technology/Transformation: Wonder Woman by Dara Birnbaum (1978), The Business of Local News by University Community Video (1974) and The Eternal Frame by Ant Farm and T.R. Uthco (1976). This volume represents the history of video art and all of these video art pieces delve into the concepts of art, media and commoditization.
