= Peter Campus =

American artist and filmmaker (born 1937)

- Born: 1937; New York City
- Education: Ohio State University
- Known for: Video art, Photography, Interactive art

Peter Campus (born 1937 in New York, NY), often styled as peter campus, is an American artist and a pioneer of new media and video art, known for his interactive video installations, single-channel video works, and photography. His work is held in the collections of numerous public institutions, including The Museum of Modern Art, Whitney Museum of American Art, Solomon R. Guggenheim Museum, Hamburger Bahnhof - Museum für Gegenwart, Tate Modern, Museo Reina Sofía, Albright-Knox Art Gallery, Walker Art Center, and the Centre Georges Pompidou. The artist works on the south shore of Long Island.

== Early life and career ==
Born and raised in New York, Campus has an eastern European Jewish family background. His mother was Ukrainian, and his father was a doctor of Romanian descent, born in the U.S. to immigrant parents. Campus' mother died when he was aged seven, an event that dramatically affected the artist's youth and family life. Inspired by several family members who worked in the art world, he developed an early interest in photography, which his father taught him, and painting. Campus cites watching Michael Powell movies as a teenager as an influential experience. He studied experimental psychology with a focus on the development of the senses and cognitive studies at Ohio State University, earning his degree in 1960.

After military service, Campus studied film editing at City College Film Institute and worked in the film industry as a production manager and editor, making documentaries until the early 1970s. During this period he developed an interest in Minimal Art, becoming friends with the sculptor Robert Grosvenor. He worked with Otto Piene and Aldo Tambellini at the Black Gate Theatre in East Village, New York. Charles Ross became a mentor and Campus worked as co-editor on Ross' Sunlight Dispersion. Robert Smithson, Nancy Holt, Bruce Nauman, Yvonne Rainer and Joan Jonas were influential figures in his decision to begin making his own art. In 1970, aged 33, Campus purchased his first video equipment.

== Work ==
Campus achieved rapid acclaim in the 1970s for a series of video works that explored issues of identity construction, perception, and subversion of the relationship between the viewer and the work. He had his first solo show in 1972 at Bykert Gallery in New York, and his first solo museum exhibition at the Everson Museum of Art in 1974. In this early period, his works consisted of single-channel videos and interactive closed-circuit television installations. Campus' first video, Dynamic Field Series (1971), features a camera suspended above the artist, which he moved up and down using a rope pulley as he lay on the floor below. In Double Vision (1971), Campus used two cameras and superimposition, beginning a more formal experimentation with the medium itself—a characteristic that recurs in his work to this day.

Other 1970s video work includes the influential Three Transitions (1973), in which the artist transforms his recorded image in three different sequences, using superimposition and chroma-keying technology. In Third Tape (1976), Campus manipulates a virtual self-image into an abstract self-portrait by filming the performer John Erdman's reflection as he progressively throws a disordered array of small mirror tiles upon a table. Campus says of this work, "This man tries to abstract himself using age-old methods reminiscent of German Expressionism, Cubism and Surrealism. Art issues of line and plane are dredged up. Perhaps to be subtitled: the war between man and man-made objects."

His interactive closed-circuit video installations include Kiva (1971), Interface (1972), Optical Sockets (1972–73), Anamnesis and Stasis (1973), Shadow Projection and Negative Crossing (1974), mem, dor, cir, and sev (1975), and lus, bys, num, and aen (1976). In A History of Video Art, Chris Meigh-Andrews describes these as works that sought to "deliberately confront the viewer with a self-image that defied or challenged normal expectations. In an important sense, these works were participatory and sculptural in that they invited or even required audience participation." They employed a wide variety of installation formats, which included close-circuit live feedback television, projection, mirroring, image distortion, and the projection of shadows. Campus' interactive works have received significant critical attention and a wide range of different critical interpretations. These perspectives include discussion of the complex issues of body identity, reality versus virtuality, self-transformation, presence and absence, the relationship of the viewer to the work of art, passivity and activity in the viewer, existentialism, the uncanny and egology.

Toward the end of the 1970s, Campus began to move away from interactive work toward large scale projection and an investigation of faces and heads as subject matter. Head of a Man with Death on his Mind (1978) is a 12 minute video of the face of a man looking directly into the camera. Both the title of the work and the image itself invite dark inner contemplation. Two further pieces, Man's Head and Woman's Head (1979), consisted of stark photo-projections of heads.

Several radical shifts occurred in Campus' work from 1979 through the 1980s. He stopped working with video entirely, taking up traditional still photography instead. He also moved away from the body and self and began to look outside, to nature and landscape photography. Describing these changes, the artist stated, "For me what was important was not the switch from video to photography, but from the interior to the exterior. The interior examinations became overwhelming…. I got very interested in nature. A lot of it was an escape from what was going on in the city. It was a place where all the things that were bothering me would disappear. Then, very quickly, about 1982, it became the subject of my work." Photographs from this period feature many images of stones, buildings, bridges, landscapes, trees, and sticks. Campus describes his search in these works as "looking for what I called 'resonance' in what I was feeling" and an effort to "discover timelessness in everyday life."

In 1988 he started working with computer imaging, producing a series of still works. This renewed Campus' interest in experimentation with the structural characteristics of the digital imaging medium, and he drew from photo-montage, digital drawing and digital image manipulation. Many of these experimental techniques would be carried over into the artist's next body of work, and his return to moving image.

In 1996, Campus began to work with video once again, producing Olivebridge and Mont Désert, working for the first time with digital video and non-linear editing. This marked the beginning of a series of significant new video works throughout the 1990s and 2000s, many presented in multi-screen monitor formations. These include Winter Journal (1997), By Degrees (1998), Video Ergo Sum (1999), Death Threat (2000), Six Movies (2001), and Time's Friction (2004–2005). These works explore a complex range of personal themes: loss, memory, death, nature and landscape, and the passing of time. Their formal characteristics are marked by Campus' highly experimental approach to the digital video medium. He uses a range of techniques including multi-layering, superimposition, color inversion, vanishings and appearances, chroma keying, colorization, image mapping, pixelation, and time distortion.

Campus has continued to work with video and video installations. Campus' 21st century works reference both the history of film and painting, with the artist digitally manipulating his videos on a granular, pixel-by-pixel level. Commonly featured are seascapes and life in coastal communities located around eastern Long Island, Massachusetts, and the French Atlantic coast—a continuation of Campus' longstanding search for personal harmony in nature. Other important influences in recent years are the advance of 4K technology, which has further enabled the artist's experimentation with the video format, and the cinematic concept of the "sequence," or the order that images appear in. Major gallery exhibitions from the past decade include Calling for Shantih (2010), dredgers (2014), circa 1980 (2017), and pause (2018) at Cristin Tierney Gallery and Now and Then (2012) at Bryce Wolkowitz Gallery.

In 2017, a survey exhibition of the artist's work, entitled video ergo sum, opened at the Jeu de Paume in Paris. Curated by Anne-Marie Duguet and featuring Campus' work from 1971 to the present, video ergo sum included a new four-channel video installation commissioned by the museum, Convergence d'images vers le port. video ergo sum has traveled to Centro Andaluz de Arte Contemporáneo in Sevilla, Spain (2017); Fundação Caixa Geral de Depósitos - Culturgest in Lisbon, Portugal (2018); The Bronx Museum of the Arts in Bronx, NY (2019); and Hanes Art Gallery at Wake Forest University, SECCA, and Reynolda House Museum of American Art in Winston-Salem, NC (2019). There was a solo exhibition for Peter Campus at the Christin Tierney Gallery in New York (2023).

From January 17-May 3, 2026, the Phillips Collection exhibited peter campus: there somewhere; the exhibit featured one of the artist’s “early videos from the late 1970s, alongside the debut of four of his latest breakthrough landscape video works, which the artist calls the phillips quartets. These later pieces, inspired by the serene coastline near the artist’s home in Long Island, are marked by a sense of tranquility and introspection, evoking a feeling of being ‘there somewhere.’”

== Academic career ==
Campus taught at the Rhode Island School of Design in 1982. From 1983 to 2014, Campus was a Clinical Associate Professor of Art and Art Education and Artist in Residence at NYU Steinhardt.

== Awards ==
Awards that Campus has earned include: a Guggenheim Fellowship (1975), Massachusetts Institute of Technology Fellowship at the Center for Advanced Visual Studies (1976–79), a National Endowment of the Arts grant (1976), and a grant from the Deutscher Akademischer Austauschdienst (1979). In 1974 he was the Artist in Residence at the Television Laboratory, WNET-TV, New York, supported by the New York State Council on the Arts.

== Selected public collections ==
Campus' work is held in several institutional collections, including:

- Albright-Knox Art Gallery, Buffalo, NY
- Allen Memorial Art Museum, Oberlin, OH
- Bowdoin College Museum of Art, Brunswick, ME
- The Brooklyn Museum, Brooklyn, NY
- Carnegie Museum of Art, Pittsburgh, PA
- CCS Bard Hessel Museum, Annandale-on-Hudson, NY
- Centre Georges Pompidou, Paris, France
- Centro Cultural Arte Contemporáneo, Mexico City, Mexico
- The Cleveland Museum of Art, Cleveland, OH
- Dallas Museum of Art, Dallas, TX
- Hamburger Bahnhof, Berlin, Germany
- Harvard Art Museums, Cambridge, MA
- High Museum of Art, Atlanta, GA
- Kunsthalle Bremen, Bremen, Germany
- Kunstmuseum Bern, Bern, Switzerland
- Los Angeles County Museum of Art, Los Angeles, CA
- List Visual Arts Center, Cambridge, MA
- Middlebury College Museum of Art, Middlebury, VT
- Mildred Lane Kemper Art Museum, St. Louis, MO
- The Museum of Modern Art, New York, NY
- Musée National d'Art Moderne, Paris, France
- National Gallery of Art, Washington, DC
- National Gallery of Canada, Ottawa, Canada
- Nelson-Atkins Museum of Art, Kansas City, KS
- Norton Museum of Art, Palm Beach, FL
- Parrish Art Museum, Water Mill, NY
- Philadelphia Museum of Art, Philadelphia, PA
- Princeton University Art Museum, Princeton, NJ
- Museo Nacional Centro de Arte Reina Sofía, Madrid, Spain
- RISD Museum, Providence, RI
- The San Francisco Museum of Modern Art, San Francisco, CA
- Smithsonian American Art Museum, Washington, DC
- Solomon R. Guggenheim Museum, New York, NY
- Stadtisches Museum Abteiberg, Mönchengladbach, Germany
- Tate Modern, London, United Kingdom
- University of Michigan Museum of Art, Ann Arbor, MI
- Walker Art Center, Minneapolis, MN
- Weatherspoon Art Museum, Greensboro, NC
- Whitney Museum of American Art, New York, NY
- Yale University Art Gallery, New Haven, CT

== See also ==
- Inside the Artist's Studio, Princeton Architectural Press, 2015. (ISBN 978-1616893040)
