= Kiss The Girls: Make Them Cry =

- Release date: 1979
- Running time: 7 mins.

Kiss The Girls: Make Them Cry is a 1979 video art piece by Dara Birnbaum. The piece is constructed of footage recorded from the television game show Hollywood Squares. The bulk of the piece is made up from recorded introductory gestures of female celebrities participating in that game show, which are synced to then-contemporary disco songs.

== Video ==
Like Birnbaum's 1978 video Technology/Transformation: Wonder Woman, the single-channel video Kiss The Girls: Make Them Cry was created via Birnbaum's recording of broadcast television, which consists of a great part of her late 1970s practice The content of the video consists of segments of the introductory shots of female celebrities on the television game show Hollywood Squares, in which they greet the audience with exaggerated body movements and facial gestures. These segments are repeated throughout the video, and are often rewound giving a "jerky" appearance to these shots. The face shots are accompanied by panning shots of the tic-tac-toe board of the Hollywood Squares set, showing the entire grid and the celebrities within.

In between Hollywood Squares footage, Birnbaum places black screens with white layers displaying the lyrics to songs used in the video. Two of these songs are by amateur singers, "Yellow Bird" and the English nursery rhyme Georgie Porgie, the latter of which being the origin of the video's title. Birnbaum also uses two contemporary disco songs in this piece, including the band Toto's adaptation of the previous rhyme Georgy Porgy and singer-songwriting duo Ashford & Simpson's Found a Cure. Unlike the other songs, Toto's "Georgy Porgy" is synchronized to the introductory shots, with the music choreographing and animating the movements of the women in the squares.

In creating Kiss The Girls: Make Them Cry Birnbaum chose women she considered female stereotypes on Hollywood Squares, whose careers "had mostly faded." Birnbaum chose women from three categories: a blond, a brunette, and a child, unique due to their self presentation in the game show. Likewise Birnbaum notes the "unreal" nature of these gestures along with their intent of appealing to a large television audience. Birnbaum's choice of contemporary disco songs was informed by her perception of the Hollywood Squares grid looking like a Disco floor.

== Critical response ==
Much of the critical response of Kiss The Girls: Make Them Cry examines Birnbaum's appropriation of television footage and critique of portrayals of femininity on television. Pamela Lee argues that Kiss the Girls: Make Them Cry is a portrayal of the game show as a "spectacle of gendered dynamics" in which the extroverted motions and gestures of the female contestants become a mechanism for the circulation of their images. For Lee the women in the video act as an "imagined spectrum of 'feminine' behavior," with these behaviors shown without their motivation. The synching of the repeated gestures to "Georgy Porgy" also allows the viewer to focus on the gesture itself, divorced from its original intent.

In his 1982 article "Allegorical Procedures: Appropriation and Montage in Contemporary Art" Benjamin Buchloh analyzes Kiss The Girls: Make Them Cry as part of an examination of the artistic technique of appropriation. Buchloh characterizes Birnbaum's television footage video works as focused on the genres and conventions of television, along with claiming that due to the "revelatory" nature of her work she can be set against media artists who sought to bring television "up to date." In analyzing Birnbaum's videos Buchloh claims that Birnbaum's work reveals "the theater of professional facial expressions, performed by actors on the television screen," which he sees as a new site of the domination of human behavior by ideology. Buchloh backs up this assertion by referring to Kiss The Girls: Make Them Cry, describing the video as the intersection of "physiognomic detail and meaning" along with referring to another Birnbaum video "POP-POP VIDEO: General Hospital/Olympic Women Speed Skating (1980).

Christine Ross focuses on the editing, arguing cutting to "not sequences or fragments but mere instants" remove the context women in the media are seen through.
