= Dara Birnbaum =

American video and installation artist (1946–2025)

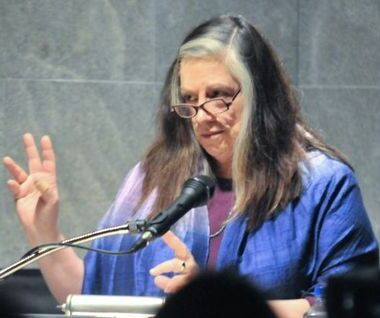
- Birnbaum in 2009
- Born: Dara Nan Birnbaum; October 29, 1946; New York City, U.S.
- Died: May 2, 2025 (aged 78); New York City, U.S.
- Known for: Installation artist, video artist
- Movement: Feminist art movement
- Parent(s): Philip Birnbaum (father); Mary Birnbaum (mother)
- Awards: American Academy of Arts and Letters (2024); John Simon Guggenheim Memorial Foundation Fellowship (2021); The Rockefeller Foundation Bellagio Center Arts Residency (2011); Pollock-Krasner Foundation Grant (2011); United States Artists Fellow Award (2010); Maya Deren Award (1987)

Dara Nan Birnbaum (October 29, 1946 – May 2, 2025) was an American video and installation artist based in New York City.

Birnbaum entered the nascent field of video art in the mid-to-late 1970s, challenging the gendered biases of the period and television’s ever-growing presence within the American household. Her oeuvre primarily addresses ideological and aesthetic features of mass media through the intersection of video art, YouTube and television. She used video to reconstruct television imagery using as materials such archetypal formats as quizzes, soap operas, and sports programmes. The foundation of her work uses techniques which involve the repetition of images and interruption of flow with text and music. She was also well known for having formed part of the feminist art movement that emerged within video art in the mid-1970s.

== Early life and education ==
Dara Nan Birnbaum was born on October 29, 1946, in Queens, New York. She was the daughter of architect Philip Birnbaum and pathologist Mary Birnbaum. Birnbaum was Jewish, and attended a high school with mostly Jewish peers. In 1969 she received her BArch in architecture at Carnegie Mellon University in Pittsburgh. She subsequently worked in the Lawrence Halprin & Associates architectural firm in San Francisco. Her work with the firm instilled a lifelong consideration of civic space and exploration of the relationship between private and public spheres in mass culture. In 1973, Birnbaum attained a BFA in painting from the San Francisco Art Institute.

== Career and artistic practice ==
In 1974, Birnbaum moved to Florence for a year and was introduced to video art by the Centro Diffusione Grafica, a gallery that encouraged its artists to explore video very early on. Shortly after her return to New York City in 1975, Birnbaum met Dan Graham, a visual artist, writer, and curator who greatly impacted her artistic development. He introduced her to Screen, a British film theory journal, which provided a critical analysis of mainstream cinema during the 1970s. Birnbaum was very interested in the journal’s discussion of an emerging feminist context in the critique of cinema, but found Screen to be flawed in its failure to consider television — a medium she believed to have replaced film as the dominant force of American mass culture.

During the mid-1970s, the poet, writer, and theoretician Alan Sondheim lent Birnbaum his Sony Portapak, which enabled her to create her first experimental video works, such as Control Piece and Mirroring. In part, these works explored the separation between the body and its representation through the use of mirrors and projected images. The presence of mirrors continued into her late-1970s video works which focused primarily on the appropriation of television's conventions. Through the fragmentation and repetition of TV conventions, she used borrowed images to examine the medium's technical structures and bodily gestures.

These explorations laid a foundation for her most prominent work, the 1978 – 1979 video art work entitled Technology/Transformation: Wonder Woman. In this work she used footage appropriated from television of Wonder Woman to subvert ideological subtexts and meanings embedded in the television series. "Opening with a prolonged salvo of fiery explosions accompanied by the warning cry of a siren, Technology/Transformation: Wonder Woman is supercharged, action-packed, and visually riveting... throughout its nearly six minutes we see several scenes featuring the main character Diana Prince... in which she transforms into the famed superhero." The Cleveland Museum of Art describes Technology/Transformation: Wonder Woman as a video work that re-edits familiar television imagery to question how mass media constructs images of gender, heroism, and popular culture.Her citational use of Wonder Woman illustrates the efforts she made into exploring "television on television," which indicates a consciousness of analyzing the television/video medium within its own terms, an exploration of the structural elements of television content, and an attempt to talk back to television.

In 1979, she started to make fast-edited video collages from footage appropriated while working for a TV post-production unit. In 1982, Birnbaum created the piece titled PM Magazine/Acid Rock with appropriated video from the nightly TV program PM Magazine and a segment of a Wang Computers commercial. The work was created for Documenta 7 as part of a four channel video installation, and later became a single channel video distributed by Electronic Arts Intermix, for which the music was recomposed by Simeon Soffer. PM Magazine/Acid Rock underscores the themes of consumerism, television, and feminism in Birnbaum's work through the use of pop images and a recomposed version of "L.A. Woman" by The Doors. In 1981, Birnbaum documented a no wave musical performance of Glenn Branca's Symphony no. 1 at the Performing Garage for Electronic Arts Intermix. In 1985, she participated in the Whitney Biennial.

In her 1990 single channel video work Canon: Taking to the Street the political act of taking to the street is framed through an iconic evocation of the Paris uprising of May 1968, interspersed with student footage from a Take Back the Night march held at Princeton University in April, 1987.

Her 1994 six channel video installation Hostage has as its subject the kidnapping of Hanns-Martin Schleyer in 1977.

Technology/Transformation: Wonder Woman is held in numerous museum collections, including the Museum of Modern Art, the Metropolitan Museum of Art, the Smithsonian, and the Whitney Museum of American Art. She also has works in the collection of the National Gallery of Canada, the Museo Nacional Centro de Arte Reina Sofía, and the S.M.A.K. Stedelijk Museum voor Actuele Kunst, Gent, Belgium.

== Personal life and death ==
Birnbaum died of metastatic endometrial cancer at a hospital in Manhattan, New York City, on May 2, 2025, at the age of 78.

== Exhibitions ==
Major retrospectives of Birnbaum's work have been presented at:

- Belvedere Palace, Vienna (2024) which included the installation Bruckner: Symphonie Nr. 5 B-Dur
- Prada Aoyama, Tokyo (2023)
- Fondazione Prada, Milan (2023)
- Hessel Museum of Art, Annandale-On-Hudson, New York (2022)
- Miller Institute for Contemporary Art, Pittsburgh, PA (2022)
- Museu de Arte Contemporånea de Serralves, Porto, Portugal (2010)
- S.M.A.K. Stedelijk Museum voor Actuele Kunst, Gent, Belgium (2009)
- Documenta 7, 8, and 9, Kassel, Germany

== Selected works ==
Dara Birnbaum works distributed by the Electronic Arts Intermix include:

- Technology/Transformation: Wonder Woman 1978-79, 5:50 min, color, sound
- Kiss The Girls: Make Them Cry (1979), 6:50 min, color, sound
- Local TV News Analysis (1980), 61:08 min, color, sound
- Pop-Pop Video (1980), 9 min, color, sound
- General Hospital/Olympic Women Speed Skating (1980), 6 min, color, sound
- Kojak/Wang (1980), 3 min, color, sound
- Remy/Grand Central: Trains and Boats and Planes (1980), 4:18 min, color, sound
- Fire! Hendrix (1982), 3:13 min, color, sound
- PM Magazine/Acid Rock (1982), 4:09 min, color, sound
- Damnation of Faust: Evocation (1983), 10:02 min, color, sound
- Damnation of Faust: Will-o'-the-Wisp (A Deceitful Goal) (1985), 5:46 min, color, sound
- Artbreak, MTV Networks, Inc. (1987), 30 sec, color, sound
- Damnation of Faust: Charming Landscape (1987), 6:30 min, color, sound
- Canon: Taking to the Streets, Part One: Princeton University - Take Back the Night (1990), 10 min, color, sound
- Transgressions (1992), 60 sec, color, sound

== Arabesque, Special Limited Edition 2021 ==
Dara Birnbaum was the first artist who participated in the D’ORO D’ART Project, for the creation of books that contain digital art. Birnbaum took on the challenge of specially transforming her four-channel video, Arabesque (2011) to a single-channel video for the book. In this special book edition, stereo sound and image are integrated, and together retrace the love and artistic relationship of Robert and Clara Schumann. Birnbaum brought together selections from Youtube clips of performances of Robert Schumann’s Arabesque, Opus 18, and a singular clip of Clara Schumann’s Romanze 1, Opus 11. Birnbaum juxtaposed these clips with still images made from footage of the 1947 film about the Schumanns, Song of Love, which tellingly features only Robert Schumann's Arabesque, Opus 18. Birnbaum’s Arabesque delicately reflects on the relationship of Robert and Clara Schumann, a relationship closely linked to music, as they are both composers and pianists. The video Arabesque, Special Limited Edition 2021 is activated by opening the book in which it is contained. The curators of the project are Barbara London and Valentino Catricalà. The book is produced by the publishing house D'ORO, based in Rome. Arabesque, Special Limited Edition 2021 was edited and post-produced by Michael Saia in New York.

== Awards ==
Birnbaum was the recipient of an Award in Art by the American Academy of Arts and Letters (2024); the John Simon Guggenheim Memorial Foundation Fellowship (2021); The Rockefeller Foundation Bellagio Center Arts Residency (2011); the Pollock-Krasner Foundation Grant (2011); and a United States Artists Fellow Award (2010). She was the first woman to receive the Maya Deren Award from the American Film Institute for video, presented in 1987. In 2017, Carnegie Mellon University created the Birnbaum Award in her honor.

== Citations ==
- Demos, T. J. (2010). Dara Birnbaum:Technology/Transformation: Wonder Woman. Afterall Publishing. ISBN 978-1-84638-066-2.
- Dara Birnbaum: Reaction. Dancing Foxes Press. 2022. ISBN 978-1954947016.
- Museu Serralves (2011). Dara Birnbaum: The Dark Matter of Media Light. SMAK. ISBN 9783791351247.
