= Martha Rosler =

American artist

- Born: 1943 (age 82–83); New York City, US
- Education: Brooklyn College, University of California, San Diego
- Known for: Photography and photo text, Video art, Installation art, Performance art, conceptual art, writing
- Notable work: Semiotics of the Kitchen (1975); House Beautiful: Bringing the War Home (c. 1967-72; 2004-2008); The Bowery in two inadequate descriptive systems (1974/1975): If You Lived Here... (1989)
- Website: www.martharosler.net

Martha Rosler (born 1943) is an American artist. She is a conceptual artist who works in photography and photo text, video, installation, sculpture, site-specific and performance, as well as writing about art and culture. Rosler's work is centered on everyday life and the public sphere, often with an eye to women's experience. Recurrent concerns are the media and war, as well as architecture and the built environment, from housing and homelessness to places of passage and systems of transport.

== Early life and education ==
Born in Brooklyn, New York, in 1943, Rosler spent formative years in California, from 1968 to 1980, first in north San Diego county and then in San Francisco. She has also lived and taught in Canada. She graduated from Erasmus Hall High School in Brooklyn, as well as Brooklyn College (1965) and the University of California, San Diego (1974). She has lived in New York City since 1981.

== Career ==
Rosler's work and writing have been widely influential. Her media of choice have included photomontage and photo-text, as well as video, sculpture, and installation. Rosler has lectured extensively, nationally and internationally. She taught photography and media, as well as photo and video history and critical studies, at Rutgers University, in new Brunswick, New Jersey, where she was a professor for thirty years, attaining the rank of Professor II. She also taught at the Städelschule in Frankfurt, Germany, as well as serving as visiting professor at the University of California's San Diego and Irvine campuses, and elsewhere.

Solo exhibitions of Rosler's work have been organized by the Whitney Museum of American Art in New York (1977), Institute of Contemporary Art in Boston (1987), Museum of Modern Art in Oxford (1990), The New Museum in collaboration with the International Center of Photography in New York, (1998–2000), Sprengel Hannover Museum (2005), Institute of Contemporary Arts in London (2006), University of Rennes (2006), and Portikus in Frankfurt (2008). Her work has also been included in major group exhibitions such as Whitney Biennial (1979, 1983, 1987, and 1990), Documenta 7 and 12 (1982 and 2007), Havana Biennale (1986), Venice Biennale (2003), Liverpool Biennial (2004), Taipei Biennial (2004) and Skulptur Projekte (2007).

Rosler serves in an advisory capacity to the departments of education at the Whitney Museum of American Art and the Museum of Modern Art, and at the Center for Urban Pedagogy (all New York City). She is a board member of the Vera List Center for Art and Politics at the New School, New York and an Advisory Board board member of the Center for Urban Pedagogy. She has also served on the board of directors of the Temple Hoyne Buell Center for the Study of American Architecture at Columbia University, New York, and she is a former member of the boards of directors of the Association for Independent Video and Film and the Media Alliance, and a former trustee of the Van Alen Center, all in New York City. Since the early 1980s she has been a regular lecturer at the Whitney Independent Study Program in New York, where she was formerly a faculty member.

Rosler is known for her writing as well as her art work in various media. She has published over 16 books of her artwork and her critical essays on art, photography, and cultural matters, some of which have appeared as well in translation. Her essays have been widely published, anthologized, and translated. She was interviewed for the film !Women Art Revolution.

== Work ==
=== Semiotics of the Kitchen ===
Semiotics of the Kitchen (1974/75) is a pioneering work of feminist video art in which, parodying early television cooking shows, Rosler demonstrates some hand tools of the kitchen in alphabetical order. As her gestures begin to veer into an unexpected and possibly alarming direction, the character eventually dispenses with the tools and uses her body as a kind of semaphore system. Rosler has suggested that this darkly humorous work is meant to challenge social expectations of women in regard to food production and, more broadly, the role of language in determining these expectations. The issue the work calls up is whether the woman can be said to "speak herself."

"Even though it was obscure looking (on purpose) and inelegant (on purpose) and unedited (on purpose), it began to look like a naïf moment of production that was the best that could be done at the time. In other words, it was seen as a pioneering work because of its low quality of production". In Semiotics of the Kitchen, Rosler goes through kitchen tools in alphabetical order to challenge the idea that women belong only in the home.

=== Other video work ===
Further video works include Vital Statistics of a Citizen, Simply Obtained (1977), Losing: A Conversation with the Parents (1977), and Martha Rosler Reads Vogue (1982), with Paper Tiger Television; Domination and the Everyday (1980) and Born to Be Sold: Martha Rosler Reads the Strange Case of Baby $/M (1988), also with Paper Tiger Television. Many of her video works address geopolitics and power, including Secrets From the Street: No Disclosure (1980); A Simple Case for Torture, or How to Sleep at Night (1983); If It's Too Bad to be True, It Could Be DISINFORMATION (1985); the three-channel installation Global Taste: A Meal in Three Courses (1985); and Because This Is Britain (2014), and many others.

Rosler employs performance-based narratives and symbolic images of mass media to disrupt viewers' expectations. Rosler says, "Video itself 'isn't innocent:' Yet video lets me construct, using a variety of fictional narrative forms, 'decoys' engaged in a dialectic with commercial TV."

These concepts are emphasized in such works as Semiotics of the Kitchen, in which a static camera is focused on a woman in a kitchen who interacts with kitchen utensils, naming and demonstrating their uses in odd gestures, speaking to the expectations of women in certain domestic spaces.

=== Photography and photomontage ===
Rosler's photo/text work The Bowery in two inadequate descriptive systems (1974/75) is considered a seminal work in conceptual and postmodern photographic practice. The series of 45 black and white prints pair photos of storefronts on the Bowery, at the time of the work's making a famous "skid row" of New York City, with photographs of mostly metaphoric groups of texts referring to drunks and drunken behavior. The photos are displayed in a grid to accentuate the anti-expressionist nature of the work and the inherent limitation of both visual and linguistic systems to describe human experiences and social problems.

Some of Rosler's best-known works are collected under the title House Beautiful: Bringing the War Home (c. 1967–72). This is a series of photomontages that juxtapose aspirational scenes of middle-class homes, mostly interiors, with documentary photos from the Vietnam War. These images were primarily distributed as photocopied fliers in and around antiwar marches and occasionally in "underground" newspapers. They continue the tradition of political photomontage in the style of John Heartfield and Hannah Höch as well as pop art such as Richard Hamilton's Just what is it that makes today's homes so different, so appealing?. Both the war images and the domestic interiors were collected from issues of Life Magazine and similar mass-market magazines, but these works sought to reunite the two apparently separate worlds to imply connections between the industries of war and the industries of the home and their common understandings .

Rosler revisited this series in 2004 and 2008 by producing new images based on the war in Iraq and Afghanistan, under the title House Beautiful: Bringing the War Home, New Series. Sensing that her original series had become accepted and aestheticized, her new series was designed to address continuities that paralleled the Vietnam War and unsettle complacent viewers. Rosler described the "rah rah" attitude of American media and politics that reminded her of the political manipulations of the past.

Also widely noted are her series of photomontages entitled Body Beautiful, or Beauty Knows No Pain (c. 1965–72), addressing the photographic representation of women and domesticity. These works slightly preceded the antiwar montages and spurred their making.

Many of these works are concerned with the geopolitics of entitlements and dispossession. Her writing and photographic series on roads, the system of air transport, and urban undergrounds (subways or metros) join her other works addressing urban planning and architecture, from housing to homelessness and the built environment, and places of passage and transportation.

Much of her work also focus antiwar and feminist ideologies in the 1960s and 2000s. Rosler's art inserts domestic and private themes into the public sphere in order to make political, social, and instructional critiques.

== Exhibitions ==
Rosler has had numerous solo exhibitions. A retrospective of her work, “Positions in the Life World” (1998–2000) was shown in five European cities (Birmingham, England; Vienna; Lyon/Villeurbanne; Barcelona; and Rotterdam) and, concurrently, at the International Center of Photography and the New Museum of Contemporary Art (both in New York). She has recently been the subject of an extensive retrospective exhibition at the Galleria Civica d’Arte Moderna e Contemporanea (GAM), in Turin. In 2006 her work was the subject of solo exhibitions at the University of Rennes and in 2007 at the Worcester Museum of Art. Her work has been seen in the Venice Biennale of 2003; the Liverpool Biennial, the Taipei Biennial (both 2004), and the Singapore Biennale (2011), and the Thessaloniki Biènnale (2017); as well as many major international survey shows, including the "Documenta" exhibitions in Kassel, Germany, of 1982 and 2007, Skulptur Projekte Münster in 2007, and several Whitney Biennials.

In 1989, in lieu of a solo exhibition at the Dia Art Foundation in New York City, Rosler organized the project "If You Lived Here...", in which over 50 artists, film- and video producers, photographers, architects, planners, homeless people, squatters, activist groups, and schoolchildren addressed contested living situations, architecture, planning, and utopian visions, in three separate exhibitions, four public forums, and associated events. In 2009, an archive exhibition based on this project, "If You Lived Here Still," opened at e-flux's gallery in New York and then traveled (2010) to Casco Office for Art Design and Theory, in Utrecht, Netherlands, and to La Virreina Centre de la Imatge in Barcelona. Following the problematic addressed by these exhibitions, Rosler together with the urbanist Miguel Robles-Durán worked on an urban installation project in Hamburg, Germany, called We Promise!(2015), which confronts the conflicting promises of urban regeneration projects in Europe via a set of public posters on the street and in public transport. Versions of the 1989 show have been mounted in many locations on several continents.

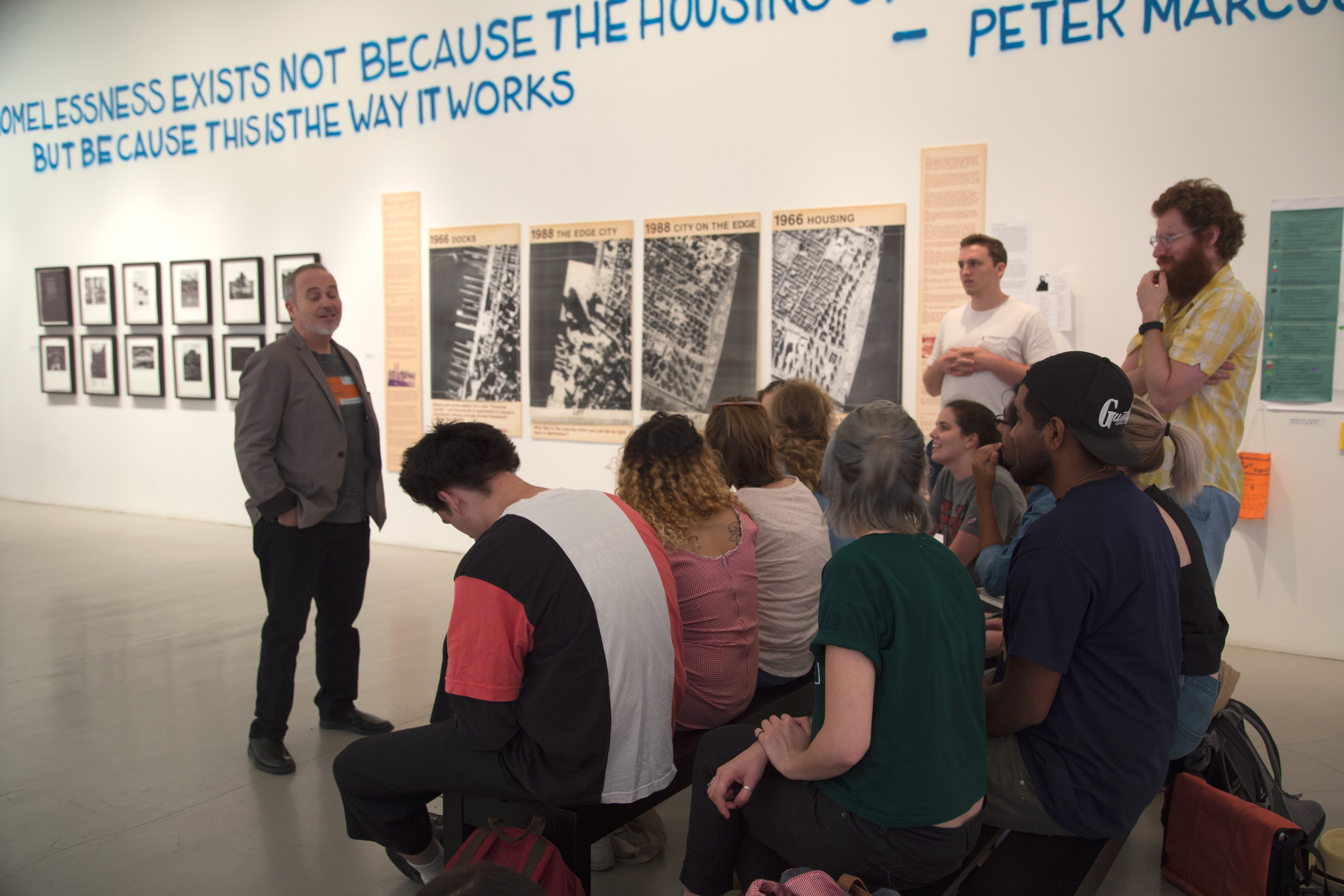
Students visiting the "If you can afford to live here, mo-o-ove!!" exhibition

In 2016, a projected year-long project at the New Foundation Seattle and in the Seattle, under the rubric "Housing Is a Human Right," was to reprise all three exhibitions of the Dia exhibition of 1989, "If You Lived Here..."—but focusing especially on contemporary Seattle. However, the New Foundation, which had also made her the first recipient of its award to a distinguished female artist working in the field of social justice, abruptly ceased public operations after the completion of the first two shows. Subsequently, also in 2016, Rosler organized an exhibition in New York that included much of the Dia and Seattle material but focused on New York City. Working with her Seattle curator Yoko Ott, and Miguel Robles-Durán, and with the assistance of Dan Wiley, who had worked with her on organizing key components of the 1989 show, as well as many others, Rosler put on the exhibition If you can't afford to live here, mo-o-ove! at Mitchell-Innes and Nash, renamed as a public space, the Temporary Office of Urban Disturbances. Four public forums on the issues of art and gentrification and the privatization of housing were also held.

At the Utopia Station exhibition at the Venice Biennale of 2003, Rosler worked with about 30 of her students from Stockholm and Copenhagen, as well as a small, far-flung internet group of former workshop participants, 'the Fleas', and her graduate students from her video seminar at Yale, to produce a mini-pavilion, newly designed and built but purposely left unfinished, as well as large banners, and a collective newspaper, as well as many projects, both individual and collective, exploring utopian schemes and communities and their political and social ramifications. Rosler has also produced two tours of historical sites, one in Hamburg (1993) and one in Liverpool (2004), in conjunction with curated art projects. At the Frieze Art Fair (London) of 2005, she conducted a tour of this temporary site from its siting and construction to all aspects of its labor, including customer service, food service, toilets, VIP lounges, publicity, maintenance, and security.

Her solo show Meta-Monumental Garage Sale was held at the Museum of Modern Art (MoMA) in New York in November 2012, revisiting a series of exhibitions she had held in 1973 in San Diego and 1977 in San Francisco that centered on the American garage sale. The sale, held in MoMA's atrium was inspired by Rosler's interest in garage sales, a social form of small-scale, local—small town and suburban—commerce largely organized and frequented by women, which she first experienced when she moved from New York, where such phenomena were then completely unknown, to Southern California. At the request of museum curators, she restaged such sales in several European art locales and in New York City starting in 1999, culminating in the Fair Trade Garage Sale at the Museum of Cultural History in Basel, in conjunction with the 2010 Basel Art Fair, and then at MoMA in 2012. The 2012 “Meta-Monumental Garage Sale” at MoMA offered over 14,000 items, including Rosler's accumulated holdings—many of which were rolled over from previous iterations of this work—and items solicited from museum employees and the public. There were also two issues of a newspaper and two public discussions, one of which included a psychic, assessing questions of value and meaning. The work, since its inception in 1973, was intended to invoke questions of art and value, as the events were always held in museums and noncommercial galleries, or in spaces associated with them, as well as to call attention to the liminal domestic spaces that women regularly negotiate economically.

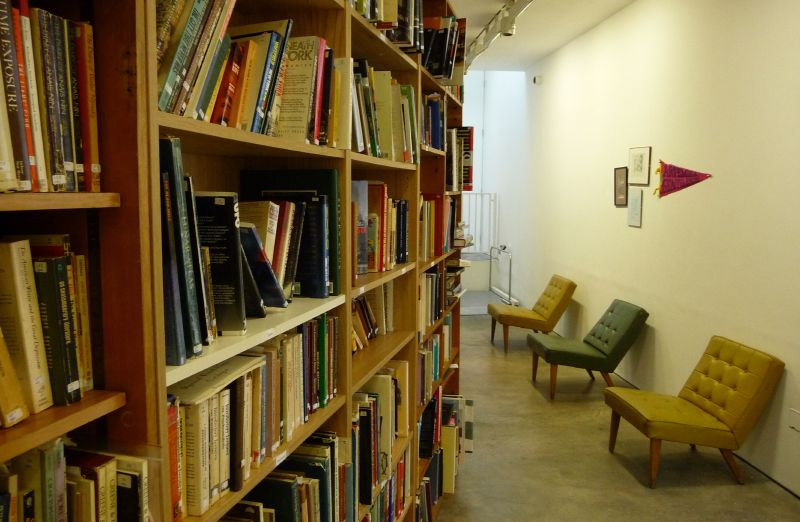
Martha Rosler Library.

Starting in November 2005, e-flux sponsored the "Martha Rosler Library," a reading room in which over 7,500 volumes from her private collection were made available as a public resource in venues in and around art institutions, schools, and libraries. The collection started at e-flux's New York gallery and then traveled to the Frankfurter Kunstverein in Germany; to Antwerp's NICC, an artist-run space, in conjunction with the MuHKA (Museum of Contemporary Art); to United Nations Plaza School in Berlin; to the Institut National de L'Histoire de L'Art in Paris; to Stills in Edinburgh; to John Moore's Art School in Liverpool; and to the Gallery at the University of Massachusetts, Amherst, before being retired. At the "Martha Rosler Library," visitors could sit and read or make free photocopies. Other projects, such as reading groups and public readings, were organized locally in conjunction with the project.

In 2018, the Jewish Museum in New York City presented Martha Rosler: Irrespective, a survey exhibition showcasing the artist's five decades-long practice, featuring installations, photographic series, sculpture, and video from the 1960s to the present.

== Activist vs. political art ==
While Rosler's primary impetus for her solo exhibition at the Dia Center for the Arts was to expose the invisibility of homelessness and urban policies that conspire to conceal the socially underprivileged, one of the few critiques of the show was that it did little to actually lessen the homelessness problem in America. When asked the difference between making activist work as an artist, and being an activist Rosler said, "To be an activist you probably have to be working intensively with a specific community and a specific issue or set of issues, specific outcomes...I am an artist. I make art. And I was also a full-time professor. Activism is an on-going process, and it’s true that I worked with activists on that project, but one thing is certain: activists don’t expect intractable problems to be solved by an exhibition or a political campaign and certainly not in six months." Rosler is known to make work around a plethora of social and political idea, from civil rights, to anti-war efforts, to women's rights. Given this information and her definition of an "activist," it is safe to assume Rosler is an artist making activist work, or political work. Rosler is a professor and frequently collaborates with her students, bringing forward a new generation of political art, with different backgrounds on the subject.

== Personal life ==
Rosler's son is the graphic novelist Josh Neufeld; they have collaborated on a number of projects.

== Published works ==
Martha Rosler's essays have been published widely in catalogues, magazines, such as Artforum, Afterimage, Quaderns, and Grey Room, and edited collections, including Women Artists at the Millennium (October Books/MIT, 2006) among many others. She has produced numerous other "word works" and photo/text publications; now exploring cookery in a mock dialogue between Julia Child and Craig Claiborne, now analyzing imagery of women in Russia or exploring responses to repression, crisis, and war. Her 1981 essay, "In, Around, and Afterthoughts (on documentary photography)," has been widely cited, republished, and translated and is credited with a great role in dismantling the myths of photographic disinterestedness and in generating a discussion about the importance of institutional and discursive framing in determining photographic meaning.

Rosler has published sixteen books of photography, art, and writing. Among them are Decoys and Disruptions: Selected Essays 1975-2001 (MIT Press, 2004), the photo books Passionate Signals (Cantz, 2005), In the Place of the Public: Observations of a Frequent Flyer (Cantz, 1997), and Rights of Passage (NYFA, 1995). If You Lived Here (Free Press, 1991) discusses and supplements her Dia project on housing, homelessness, and urban life. Several books, in English and other languages, were published in 2006, including a 25-year edition of 3 Works (Press of the Nova Scotia College of Art and Design) with a new foreword by Rosler. The collection Imágenes Públicas, Spanish translations of some essays and video scripts, was published in 2007. Her book Culture Class, on gentrification, artists, art institutions, and the Culture Class theory, was published by e-flux and Sternberg Press in 2013.

== Videography ==
- A Budding Gourmet 1974, 17:45 min, b&w, sound
- Semiotics of the Kitchen 1975, 6:09 min, b&w, sound
- Losing: A Conversation with the Parents 1977, 18:39 min, color, sound
- The East Is Red, The West Is Bending 1977, 19:57 min, color, sound
- From the PTA, the High School and the City of Del Mar 1977, 6:58 minutes
- Vital Statistics of a Citizen, Simply Obtained 1977, 39:20 min, color, sound
- Travelling Garage Sale 1977, 30 min, b&w
- Domination and the Everyday 1978, 32:07 min, color, sound
- Secrets From the Street: No Disclosure 1980, 12:20 min, color, sound
- Optimism/Pessimism: Constructing a Life 1981, 44 minutes
- Watchwords of the Eighties 1981-82, 62 minutes
- Martha Rosler Reads Vogue 1982, 25:45 min, color, sound
- A Simple Case for Torture, or How to Sleep at Night 1983, 62 minutes
- Fascination with the (Game of the) Exploding (Historical) Hollow Leg 1983, 58:16 min, color, sound
- If it's too bad to be true, it could be Disinformation 1985, 16:26 min, color, sound
- Global Taste: A Meal in Three Courses 1985, 30 minutes, 3-channel installation
- Born to be Sold: Martha Rosler Reads the Strange Case of Baby $/M (with Paper Tiger Television) 1988, 35 min, color, sound
- In the Place of the Public: Airport Series 1990, 4 hrs, color, sound
- Greenpoint: The Garden Spot of the World 1993, 19:24 minutes
- How Do We Know What Home Looks Like? 1993, 31 min, color, sound
- Seattle: Hidden Histories 1991-95, 13 min, color, sound
- Chile on the Road to NAFTA 1997, 10 min, color, sound
- Prototype (God Bless America) 2006, 1 minute
- Semiotics of the Kitchen: An Audition 2011, 10:26 min, color, sound
- Because This Is Britain, 2014, 3 minutes
- Museums Will Eat Your Lunch, 2014, 3 minutes
- Pencicle of Praise, 2018, 12 minutes

== Awards ==
- 2005 Spectrum International Prize in Photography — accompanied by a retrospective, “If Not Now, When?” largely of photo and video works but also a garage sale, at the Sprengel Museum in Hanover and, on slightly smaller scale, at the Neue Gesellschaft der Bildende Kunst, or NGBK in Berlin. The book Passionate Signals accompanied this exhibition.
- 2006 Oskar Kokoschka Prize — Austria's highest fine arts award
- 2007 Anonymous Was A Woman Award
- 2009 USA Artists Nimoy Fellow for photography
- 2009 Civitella Ranieri Residency
- 2010 Lifetime Achievement Award (Guggenheim Museum)
- 2011 Deutsche Akademische Austausch Diennst (DAAD) Berlin fellowship
- 2012 Doctorate in Fine Arts Honoris Causa (Nova Scotia College of Art and Design)
- 2012 Distinguished Feminist Award (College Art Association)
- 2014 Doctorate in Fine Arts Honoris Causa (Courtauld Institute of Art)
- 2016 Honorary Doctor of Fine Arts (Rhode Island School of Design)
- 2016 New Foundation Seattle Inaugural award — for a woman artist working toward social justice
- 2016 Distinguished Artist Award (Women's Caucus for Art)
- 2017 Lichtwark Prize (City of Hamburg, Germany) — awarded every five years

== Bibliography (selected) ==
- "Service: A Trilogy on Colonization" (New York: Printed Matter), 1978. Republished 2008. Translated into Italian, 2013.
- "Martha Rosler: 3 Works" (Press of the Nova Scotia college of Art and Design), 3 Works (1981; republished Press of the Nova Scotia College of Art and Design, 2006) ISBN 0-919616-46-1, including the following essay:
- "In, around, and afterthoughts (on documentary photography)" (1981)
- If You Lived Here: The City in Art, Theory, and Social Activism (Free Press, 1991)
- Rights of Passage (NYFA, 1995)
- In the Place of the Public: Observations of a Frequent Flyer (Cantz, 1997)
- Martha Rosler: Positions in the Life World (MIT Press, 1999)
- Decoys and Disruptions: Selected Essays 1975-2001 (MIT Press; an October Book, 2004)
- Passionate Signals (Cantz, 2005)
- Imágenes Públicas (Editorial Gustavo Gili, 2007)
- Culture Class (e-flux and Sternberg Press, 2013)
- Clase Cultural (Caja Negra, 2017)
- Martha Rosler: Irrespective (Yale University Press and the Jewish Museum, 2018)
- Ober, Cara. “Martha Rosler: Art as Activism, Democratic Socialism, and the Changing Role of Women Artists as They Age.” BmoreArt Baltimore Contemporary Art, 4 July 2019
- La Dominación y lo cotidiano: ensayos y guiones (November, 2019)

== See also ==
- Feminist art movement in the United States
