= Bruce and Norman Yonemoto =

Bruce Yonemoto
- Born: 1949; San Jose, California
- Education: 1971 BA, University of California at Berkeley; 1979 MFA, Otis College of Art and Design; Graduate Studies at the Sokei Art Institute
- Occupations: Visual artist, Professor of Art at University of California, Irvine and resident-faculty for video, experimental media, film theory
- Years active: 1976 -
- Notable work: Garage Sale II; Memory, Matter, and Modern Romance
- Relatives: Norman Yonemoto (brother)
- Website: http://bruceyonemoto.net

Bruce Yonemoto and Norman Yonemoto are two Los Angeles, California-based video/installation artists of Japanese American heritage.

== Family background and birth ==
Bruce and Norman Yonemoto's family was among the 120,000 incarcerated Japanese Americans during World War II. Their mother, Fumiko Rosie Hitomi, was placed with her family at Tule Lake in Northern California. Their father, Tak Yonemoto, had been drafted into the United States Army. When Rosie's uncle was brutally murdered in camp, Tak sent condolences and rekindled their relationship. Soon after, they were given permission to marry and leave the camp. Rosie was then allowed to relocate to Chicago, where Norman was born in 1946.

Once the war ended and Japanese Americans were released, the family relocated to Northern California where their father worked as a carnation grower and plant pathogist. Bruce was born in 1949 in San Jose. They have two other brothers, Gerald and Roger.

== Education ==
Growing up in the 1950s in Santa Clara, California, the two brothers were actively a part of the post-war idealism and the culture of movies and television shows. Some 8 mm home movies, projection screens, and television sets became a part of everyday life. Perhaps even more importantly, their mother went against the cultural grain of the time and talked to her sons about the Japanese American incarceration experience.

Norman Yonemoto's training was in film. After Santa Clara University, University of California, Berkeley and UCLA, he attended the American Film Institute for two years where he earned his MFA in 1972. Bruce Yonemoto, however, sought his training in the visual arts. After UC Berkeley, he went to Tokyo, studying at the Sokei Bijitsu Gakkō. Once he returned to California, he obtained his Masters in Fine Art at the Otis Art Institute. He is currently the chair and professor of the Art Department at the University of California, Irvine.

== Works ==
=== Works by the Yonemotos ===
Both brothers utilize Los Angeles as tool and backdrop for a number of projects, drawing particularly from the Hollywood veneer of glamour and romance. From 1976 through the 1990s, the brothers collaborated on numerous films, single-channel videos and video installations. Their first collaboration, Garage Sale (1976), was a 16 mm feature film about a young blond man named Hero and his wife drag queen Goldie Glitters. As Goldie demands a divorce, Hero, in a frenzy to retain her love, encounters numerous characters – each with their own idiosyncrasies and their own definitions for success. The actress who plays Goldie was drag-queen Goldie Glitters, Santa Monica City College's 1975 Homecoming Queen. Though it is made obvious to the audience that Goldie is actually a man, the line between reality and fiction is blurred when Goldie is sympathetically portrayed as a woman tapping into recognizable fantasies imbued into contemporary culture through fictional Hollywood romances and unrealistic dreams.

Similar themes, clashing idea, and the juxtaposition and confusion of reality with fiction echo through their subsequent projects which assemble raw materials from their post-WWII youth and home videos with recognizable Hollywood and industry-inspired scenes, dialogues, and romances. Their projects confront the collision of cultures, ethnicities, and sexuality by alluding to and referencing the Japanese American incarceration, their Japanese heritage, the fact of Norman being gay, their postwar 'Americanization', Hollywood, and commercialism.

Some of their projects include Based on Romance (1979); An Impotent Metaphor (1979), Green Card: An American Romance (1982); Vault (1984); Kappa (1986) and Made in Hollywood (1990), videos that explore the space between the romantic fantasies of Hollywood and the reality of human psychosexual relationships. Their recent works include a 1993 collaboration with John Baldessari for the Santa Monica Museum of Art entitled Three Locations/Three Points of View, A Matter of Memory (1995) and Silicon Valley (1999). As a contributor to the field of film and video, the Yonemoto brothers often utilized the language and imagery of film to expose and subvert the powers of racist propaganda, of film. A Matter of Memory considers the act of memory and the reconstruction of lost or faded memory.

The latter collaborations have almost all been commissioned by museums and utilize specific gallery spaces to affect the viewer's experience, often collaborating color, still and moving images, sound, and movement to challenge the viewer.

Norman Yonemoto
- Born: 1946; California, U.S.A.
- Died: February 28, 2014; Venice, Los Angeles, California
- Education: Santa Clara University; University of California at Berkeley and Los Angeles; 1972 MFA, the American Film Institute
- Occupations: Visual artist, screen writer, producer
- Years active: 1976 -
- Notable work: Garage Sale II; Memory, Matter, and Modern Romance
- Relatives: Bruce Yonemoto (brother)

Notes
- Granted by 1995 CCF Fellowship for Visual Artists as a mid-career artist 1998 National Endowment for the Arts 1993 Maya Deren Award (American Film Institute Award for Independent Film and Video Artists); 1998 Rockefeller Foundation Intercultural Film/Video/Multimedia Fellowship

=== Norman's works ===
Norman Yonemoto has worked with his brother Bruce from early days as video artists. Based on Romance shows his talent as a screenwriter among their early works exhibited in 1980 in California, with Garage Sale II as among Pacific Film Archives, University of California at Berkeley, and in 1989 their retrospective exhibition by Long Beach Museum of Art. Norman collaborated with Bruce over 20 years on their impressive works of films and video. The audience would encounter those Hollywood melodrama they could recall and popular television commercial messages, but in segmented pieces fabricated together, showing the repeated patterns the mass media supply daily.

The subject which Bruce Yonemoto themes his works on is his perceptions of mass media and how they influence our desires as well as identity. People think that it is they themselves who identify their social image, and memories of others they hold is quite personal. Yonemoto presents that it is the mass media who make people believe in virtues which they were given by the mass media.

Norman died in his home in Venice, California on February 28, 2014 after a series of strokes over a period of time.

== Recognition ==
The Yonemoto brothers had received numerous awards, including the 1993 Maya Deren Award for Experimental Film and video; the Rockefeller Foundation Intercultural Film/Video/Multimedia Fellowship, the American Film Institute for Independent Film and Videomaker Grant, and Best New Narrative at the Atlanta Film and Video Festival.

Their work is in numerous permanent museum collections: among them, the Museum of Modern Art and the Whitney Museum of American Art in New York; the Japanese American National Museum and the J Paul Getty Museum in Los Angeles, the Long Beach Museum of Art and the Hara Museum of Contemporary Art in Tokyo.

Their work is also in private collections, including that of Peter and Eileen Norton.

=== Memory, Matter and Modern Romance ===
Norman born 1946, and Bruce 1948, they were honored with recognition in their mid-life at the exhibition Memory, Matter and Modern Romance at the Japanese American National Museum in Los Angeles, January 23 - July 4, 1999. Catalog essays included Ian Buruma, Karin Higa and Timothy Martin.

The occasion was realized with funds from the Andy Warhol Foundation for the Visual Arts, the Peter Norton Family Foundation, the National Endowment for the Arts, and the California Arts Council.

== Permanent collections ==
- Centre Pompidou, Paris, France (2014)

Vault, 1984; Bruce Yonemoto (1949 - ), Norman Yonemoto (1946 - 2014); Betacam NTSC, couleur, purchased 1994; Inventory number:AM 1994-404
Kappa, 1986; Mike Kelley (1954 - 2012), Bruce Yonemoto (1949 - ), Norman Yonemoto (1946 - 2014); Fichier ProRes, couleur, purchased 2014; Inventory number:AM 2014-659 "Centre Pompidou".

- Cornell University, Ithaca, New York
- Donnell Library Collections, New York, New York
- Florida Atlantic University, Boca Raton, Florida
- Fonds National d'Art Contemporain (National Collection of France)
- Hara Museum of Contemporary Art, Tokyo, Japan
- Japanese American National Museum, Los Angeles, California
- Kemper Museum of Contemporary Art, Kansas City, Kansas
- La Jolla Museum of Contemporary Art, La Jolla, California
- Long Beach Museum of Art, Long Beach, California

Framed, 1989; Norman Yonemoto (1946 - 2014); video and slide projection, mirror, scrim, and backdrop

- Museum of Contemporary Art (MoCA), Los Angeles

Under the Big Black Sun; Paul Schimmel; Bruce Yonemoto, Norman Yonemoto

- Museum of Modern Art, New York, NY

Green Card: An American Romance; Bruce Yonemoto, Norman Yonemoto, Nikolai Ursin (cameraman); Object number 590.1984; acquired in 1982 for the exhibition Video: Recent Acquisitions (July 1–August 12, 1982).

It's a Matter of Memory; Bruce Yonemoto, Norman Yonemoto; standard audio cassette; vv99.3; archived March 4, 1999

- Norton Family Foundation
- San Diego Museum of Art
- UCLA Hammer Museum
- University of Texas, Austin (2013)
- Whitney Museum of Art

== Bibliography ==
=== Books ===
- Baldessari, John; Martin, Tim; Yonemoto, Bruce (1986). TV Generations: (LACE, Los Angeles Contemporary Exhibitions, February 21 through April 12, 1986). Los Angeles, Calif., USA. ISBN 0-937335-00-2. Book consisting of two different format nested: The catalog and the texts.
- Higa, Karin. Some Thoughts on National and Cultural Identity: Art by Contemporary Japanese American Artists (Artist's Pages.). Vol. 55 (Fall 1996).
- Buruma, Ian; Higa, Karin; Martin, Timothy (1999). Bruce and Norman Yonemoto. Bruce Yonemoto (artist), Norman Yonemoto (artist). Los Angeles, the USA: Japanese American National Museum. ISBN 0-911291-26-1. Notes : Exposition, Los Angeles, Japanese American National Museum, 1999; Kandinsky Library, Ponpideu Center.
- Chattopadhyay, Collette. Matter and Memories: Memory, Matter, and Modern Romance. Vol. 27.
- Higa, Karin (1999). "Bruce and Norman Yonemoto: Memory, Matter, and Modern Romance". Los Angeles: Japanese American National Museum.
- Yonemoto, Bruce; Yonemoto, Norman (1999). Bruce and Norman Yonemoto: Memory, Matter and Modern Romance. Sherri Schottlaender (Editor). Japanese American National Museum. ISBN 978-188116104-2.
- Grenier, Catherine (2006). Experimental City, catalog for the exhibition. the Centre Pompidou. pp. 17–48. Also published Panama edition.
- Grenier, Catherine; James, David E; Dannenmüller, Sophie (2006). Los Angeles 1955-1985. Centre Pompidou. ISBN 978-275-570150-0.
- Kelley, Kara (2007). "Hallmark". Encyclopedia of Asian American Artists: Artists of the American Mosaic. Westport: Greenwood Press.
- Ollman, Leah (27 October 2007). Brief Article, Art in America, September 1999. New York. via FindArticles.com
- Adams, Parveen; Breitwieser, Sabine; Carson, Juli; Ulmer, Gregory L (2007). Exile of the imaginary: politics, aesthetics, love. Generali Foundation. Vienna, Allemagne: W. König. ISBN 978-3-86560-211-4. Exhibition toured to Vienna (18 January through 29 April 2007). Title in German is Exil des Imaginären. Politik, Asthetik, Liebe. The exhibition was held by Generali Foundation, 2007.
- Buckley, Brad; Conomos, John, eds. (February 28, 2010). Rethinking the Contemporary Art School: the Artist. The PH.D. and the Academy. Bruce Yonemoto (Contributor), et al. Press of the Nova Scotia College of Art and Design. ISBN 978-091961649-3. With contribution by Bruce Barber, Su Baker, Mikkel Bogh, Juli Carson, Edward Colless, Jay Coogan, and Luc Courchesne.
- "6". Rethinking the Contemporary Art School: The Artist, the PhD and the Academy. Halifax, Nova Scotia, Canada: The Press of the Nova Scotia College of Art and Design. 2010. pp. 90–101.
- Pacific Standard Time: Los Angeles Art, 1945-1980. Getty Research Institute. October 18, 2011. ISBN 978-1606060728.
- Silver, Shell (2012). Tokyo Tower. p. 122.
- James, David E. "Independent Film in Los Angeles". Los Angeles from 1955-1985. Getty Institute. pp. 49–53.

=== Journals ===
- Yonemoto, Bruce (2008). Institute of Art and Design; Research Development Committee of Institute of Art & Design (eds.). "Support for Art Practice". University Art Practice and Research Funding. Ibaraki, Japan: Graduate School of Comprehensive Human Sciences, University of Tsukuba.
- Yonemoto, Bruce (2012). "Kintsugi at the Tokyo Wonder Site". Otis College of Art and Design Magazine. Vol. 13, no. Fall. Otis College of Art and Design. p. 27.

== Videos ==
- Bruce and Norman Yonemoto (1989). Framed: [a video installation]. Long Beach Museum of Art. ASIN B00072TK3Y. Exhibited between March 19 to April 23, 1989.
