= List of Whitney Biennial artists =

This is an incomplete list of Whitney Biennial artists selected for the Whitney Biennial exhibitions of contemporary American art, at the Whitney Museum of American Art in New York City, United States. The event began as an annual exhibition in 1932, the first biennial was in 1973. The Whitney show is generally regarded as one of the leading shows in the art world, often setting or leading trends in contemporary art.

== 1973 ==
- Alice Adams
- William Allan
- Terry Allen
- Carl Andre
- Jo Baer
- Malcolm C.W. Bailey
- John Baldessari
- Thomas Bang
- Paula Barr
- Frances Barth
- Joel Bass
- Robert Bechtle
- Lynda Benglis
- Fletcher Benton
- Tony Berlant
- Jake Berthot
- Natalie Bieser
- Ronald Bladen
- Bill Bollinger
- Louise Bourgeois
- Frank Bowling
- James Boynton
- Peter Bradley
- Roger Brown
- Howard Buchwald
- Peter Campus
- Cynthia Carlson
- John Chamberlain
- Dan Christensen
- Edward Clark
- John Clem Clarke
- Arthur Cohen
- Joyce Cole
- Jaime Davidovitch
- Gene Davis
- S.A. Davis
- Roy De Forest
- Stuart Diamond
- David Diao
- Guy Dill
- Jim Dine
- John Duff
- Loretta Dunkelman
- Robert Duran
- Jimmy Ernst
- Fred Eversley
- Charles Fahlen
- Jackie Ferrara
- Rafael Ferrer
- Louise Fishman
- Sherron Francis
- Mary Frank
- Helen Frankenthaler
- Ernest Frazier
- Richard Friedberg
- William Geis
- Gregory Gillespie
- Carl Gliko
- Michael Goldberg
- Sidney Goodman
- Robert Gordy
- Adolph Gottlieb
- Jacqueline Gourevitch
- Stephen Greene
- Ken Greenleaf
- Mary Grigoriadis
- Nancy Grossman
- Robert Grosvenor
- Peter Gutkin
- Ira Joel Haber
- Michael D. Hall
- Duane Hanson
- Randy Hardy
- Robert Hartman
- Joe Haske
- Al Held
- Gilah Hirsch
- Will Horwitt
- Gary Hudson
- Joel Janowitz
- Neil Jenney
- Alfred Jensen
- Luis Jiménez
- Jasper Johns
- Buffie Johnson
- Lester Johnson
- Joan Jonas
- Donald Judd
- Alex Katz
- Lila Katzen
- Jane Kaufman
- Ellsworth Kelly
- Lyman Kipp
- Harriet Korman
- Lee Krasner
- Barbara Kruger
- Nicholas Krushenick
- Frances Kuehn
- Kay Kurt
- Ronnie Landfield
- Richard Landry
- Alfred Leslie
- Mon Levinson
- Alexander Liberman
- Roy Lichtenstein
- Robert Lawrance Lobe
- Alvin D. Loving
- Brice Marden
- John Mason
- Louisa Matthíasdóttir
- Denis McCarthy
- Ann McCoy
- Richard McDermott Miller
- David McManaway
- Clement Meadmore
- Brenda Miller
- Mary Miss
- Joan Mitchell
- Richard Mock
- Joan Moment
- Robert Morris
- Ree Morton
- Robert Moskowitz
- Robert Motherwell
- Catherine Murphy
- Elizabeth Murray
- Robert Murray
- Forrest Myers
- Louise Nevelson
- Kenneth Noland
- Richard Nonas
- David Novros
- Jim Nutt
- Kenzo Okada
- Jules Olitski
- William Omwake
- George Ortman
- Ray Parker
- Ed Paschke
- Philip Pearlstein
- Joel Perlman
- Irving Petlin
- William Pettet
- Larry Poons
- Catherine Porter
- Joanna Pousette-Dart
- Richard Pousette-Dart
- Robert Povlich
- Harvey Quaytman
- Joseph Raffael
- Christina Ramberg
- Robert Rauschenberg
- Peter Reginato
- James Reineking
- Milton Resnick
- Tony Robbin
- Dorothea Rockburne
- Robert Rohm
- Bernard Rosenthal
- Ed Ruda
- Ludwig Sander
- Ray Saunders
- Charles Schucker
- William Schwedler
- Arden Scott
- John Seery
- Richard Serra
- Alan Shields
- Nate Shiner
- Ed Shostak
- Alex Siburney
- Alan Siegel
- Louis Siegriest
- Arlene Slavin
- Susan Smith
- Tony Smith
- Robert Smithson
- Kenneth Snelson
- Joan Snyder
- Jack Sonenberg
- Keith Sonnier
- Raphael Soyer
- Christopher Sproat
- Bob Stanley
- Jim Starrett
- Michael Steiner
- Pat Steir
- Frank Stella
- Gary Stephan
- Nancy Stevenson Graves
- Sylvia Stone
- George Sugarman
- Andy Tavarelli
- Gary Tenenbaum
- Edgar Tolson
- George Trakas
- Anne Truitt
- Susan Tunick
- Cy Twombly
- Jack Tworkov
- Nancy van Deren
- Lester Van Winkle
- Robert Wade
- Jeffrey Way
- William Wegman
- Neil Welliver
- Lynton Wells
- Salle Werner
- Tom Wesselmann
- H. C. Westermann
- Jay Wholley
- William T. Wiley
- Hannah Wilke
- Neil Williams
- Chris Wilmarth
- Jackie Winsor
- Philip Wofford
- Nina Yankowitz
- Adja Yunkers
- Robert Zakanitch
- Larry Zox

== 1975 ==
- Billy Adler
- Martha Alf
- James R. Anderson
- David Anderson
- John Arvanites
- Dennis Ashbaugh
- Domingo Barreres
- W.B. Bearman
- Tony Bechara
- Gene Beery
- Allen Edward Bertoldi
- Gary Beydler
- Ross Bleckner
- George Bolling
- Cheryle Bowers
- Robin Bruch
- Scott Burton
- Barry Buxkamper
- Jim Byrne
- Sam Cady
- Cristiano Camacho
- Larry Ray Camp
- Sarah Anne Canright
- Mel Casas
- Thomas Chimes
- Joseph Clower
- Maxine Cole
- Christopher Darton
- Phil Douglas Davis
- Joe Di Giorgio
- John Dickson
- Paul Dillon
- John E. Dowell, Jr.
- Juan Downey
- Carol Eckman
- William Fares
- Frank Faulkner
- Kathleen Ferguson
- Carole Fisher
- Kent Floeter
- John Ford
- Terry Fox
- Hermine Freed
- Charles F. Gaines
- Charles Garabedian
- Richard George
- Abigail Gerd
- Frank Gillette
- Roland Ginzel
- Joel Glassman
- Ron Gorchov
- John S. Gordon
- George Green
- Tom Green
- Dominick Guida
- Fred N. Guyot
- Don Hazlitt
- Leonard L. Hunter
- Miyoko Ito
- Jack Jefferson
- Pamela Jenrette
- Virginia Johnson
- Jerry Jones
- David Jones
- Elizabeth ann Knox
- Beryl Korot
- Paul Kos
- Robert Kushner
- Salvatore J. La Rosa
- Patricia Lay
- Marilyn Lenkowsky
- Alvin Light
- Carol Lindsley
- Kim MacConnel
- David Mackenzie
- William E. Mahan
- Andy Mann
- Allan McCollum
- Jan Lee McComas
- Todd McKie
- Judith Suzanne Miller
- George Miller
- Scott Miller
- Rudolph Montanez
- Philip Mullen
- Hiroshi Murata
- Hass Murphy
- John Nargolies
- Paula Nees
- Stuart Nielson
- Rob Roy Norton, Jr.
- Mary McLean Obering
- Carl Palazzolo
- Lan Payne
- James Perry
- Judy Pfaff
- Tomaso Puliafito
- Cherie Raciti
- Kaare Rafoss
- Anthony Ramos
- David Reed
- Roland Reiss
- Gregg Renfrow
- Philip Renteria
- Bill Richards
- Judy Rifka
- Frank Rivera
- George Rodart
- John Scott Roloff
- Edward Ross
- Barbara Rossi
- Barbara Quinn Roth
- Edwin Rothfarb
- Paul Rotterdam
- Allen Ruppersberg
- Ursula Schneider
- John Schnell
- Barbara Schwartz
- Samuel Scott
- Ilene Segalove
- Rudy Serra
- Charles Simonds
- Alexis Smith
- Andrew Spence
- Earl Staley
- Barbara Strasen
- John Sturgeon
- Gene Sturman
- Susanna Tanger
- Robert Thiele
- Richard Thompson
- Ken Tisa
- Alan Turner
- Alan Uglow
- Carolynn Umlauf
- Thomas M. Uttech
- Bill Viola
- Mary Warner
- Robert J. Warrens
- Sibyl L. Weil
- John Wenger
- Wanda Westcoast
- Mark Christian Wethli
- Edward R. Whiteman
- Andrew Wilf
- Donald Roller Wilson
- Connie Zehr
- Elyn Zimmerman

== 1977 ==
- H.C. Westermann
- Woody Vasulka
- Agnes Martin
- Duane Hanson
- Terry Allen
- Alfred J. Jensen
- James Hill
- Chuck Close
- Dennis Oppenheim
- Robert Ryman
- Alan Sondheim
- Mel Bochner
- Duane Michals
- David True
- Ree Morton
- Joan Jonas
- Peter Campus
- Joel Shapiro
- Alan Saret
- Charles Simonds
- Andy Mann
- Brice Marden
- Vito Acconci
- Pat Steir
- Allan Kaprow
- Richard Tuttle
- Nancy Holt
- William Wegman
- Keith Sonnier
- Lynda Benglis
- Nam June Paik
- Richard Estes
- Ron Gorchov
- Elizabeth Murray
- Joe Zucker
- Dorothea Rockburne
- Jackie Winsor
- Richard Serra
- Barry Le Va
- Jennifer Bartlett
- Michael Heizer
- Nicholas Africano
- Willie Walker
- Robert Cumming
- Bruce Nauman
- Brian Connell
- Terry Fox
- Stephen A. Davis
- Howard Fried
- Joan Brown
- John Baldessari
- Ilene Segalove
- Lewis Baltz
- Chris Burden
- Vija Celmins
- Jim Nutt

== 1979 ==
- Gregory Gillespie
- Deborah Butterfield
- Robert Arneson
- Larry Gottheim
- H. C. Westermann
- Paul Sharits
- Ellsworth Kelly
- Martin Puryear
- Christina Ramberg
- Roger Brown
- James Benning
- Hollis Frampton
- Bruce Baillie
- Kim MacConnel
- Alan Sondheim
- Craig Kauffman
- Robert Nelson
- Chuck Close
- Anthony Ramos
- Stuart Sherman
- Philip Pearlstein
- Mel Bochner
- Barbara Schwartz
- Lois Lane
- Christa Maiwald
- Alice Aycock
- William Beckley
- Donna Dennis
- Donald Sultan
- Robert Moskowitz
- Joan Jonas
- Richard Foreman
- Joel Shapiro
- Judith Murray
- Bill Viola
- Jane Brettschneider
- John Sanborn
- Susan Rothenberg
- Alex Katz
- Rodney Ripps
- Brice Marden
- Joyce Kozloff
- Rita Myers
- Jackie Ferrara
- Brenda Goodman
- Martha Haslanger
- Edda Renouf
- Manuel DeLanda
- Nancy Holt
- Frank Stella
- Kit Fitzgerald
- Jonas Mekas
- Bryan Hunt
- David Haxton
- Walter Gutman
- Elizabeth Murray
- Joe Zucker
- Barbara Buckner
- Lucas Samaras
- Mary Frank
- Sol LeWitt
- Dorothea Rockburne
- George Trakas
- Jackie Winsor
- Christopher Wilmarth
- Richard Serra
- Jennifer Bartlett
- Ralph Humphrey
- Robert Breer
- Jody Pinto
- Stan Brakhage
- Howard Fried
- Martha Rosler
- Warren Sonbert
- Bruce Conner
- John Baldessari
- Dennis Evans
- Roy Lichtenstein
- James Suris
- Kenneth Price
- Robert Graham
- Jonathan Borofsky
- Billy Al Bengston
- Patrick Hogan
- Alexis Smith
- Robert Mangold
- Michael Singer
- Philip Guston

== 1981 ==
- Richard Thompson
- Richard Misrach
- Larry Gottheim
- Al Held
- Paul Sharits
- Ellsworth Kelly
- Martin Puryear
- Robert Snyder
- Hollis Sigler
- Ed Paschke
- George Landow
- Jo Ann Callis
- Russ Warren
- Duane Hanson
- Vernon Fisher
- Hollis Frampton
- Kim Macconnel
- Richard Shaw
- Edward Kienholz
- Katherine Porter
- Willem de Kooning
- Robert Adams
- Leland Rice
- Peter Lodato
- Grant Mudford
- Siah Armajani
- William Bailey
- Taka Limura
- Ernie Gehr
- James Benning
- Dennis Oppenheim
- Robert Wilson
- Stuart Sherman
- Jack Tworkov
- William Anastasi
- Barry Gerson
- Bruce Robbins
- Judith Shea
- Duane Michals
- Steve Keister
- Alice Aycock
- Larry Clark
- James Rosenquist
- Ken Jacobs
- Robert Moskowitz
- Joel Meyerowitz
- Joel Shapiro
- Mary Miss
- Joan Thorne
- Benno Friedman
- Peter D'Agostino
- Robert Mapplethorpe
- Shalom Gorewitz
- Owen Morrel
- Julian Schnabel
- Bill Viola
- John Sanborn
- Vito Acconci
- Andrew Noren
- Jan Groover
- Frank Gillette
- Joan Snyder
- Robert Zakanitch
- Bill Jensen
- Martha Haslanger
- Nancy Holt
- Davidson Gigliotti
- William Wegman
- Sandy Skoglund
- Bette Grodon
- Kit Fitzgerald
- Victor Schrager
- Lynda Benglis
- Benni Efrat
- Nam June Paik
- Buky Schwartz
- Bryan Hunt
- David Haxton
- Gregory Amenoff
- Elizabeth Murray
- Barbara Buckner
- Judy Pfaff
- Rackstraw Downes
- Neil Jenney
- Richard Francisco
- Kenneth Anger
- Yvonne Rainer
- Richard Serra
- Robert Kushner
- Sally Shapiro
- Jedd Garet
- Jennifer Bartlett
- Christo
- Scott Burton
- Louisa Chase
- Robert Frank
- Arthur Ollman
- Rafael Ferrer
- Richard Fleischner
- Harry Callahan
- Stan Brakhage
- Wayne Thiebaud
- Howard Fried
- Richard Diebenkorn
- Robert Breer
- Robert Fichter
- Kenneth Price
- Chick Strand
- Michael Brewster
- Charles Arnoldi
- Jonathan Borofsky
- John Divola
- Alexis Smith
- Robert Comming
- William Larson

== 1983 ==
- James Herbert
- Melissa Miller
- Stan Vanderbeek
- Martha Rosler
- Bob Snyder
- Kenneth Shorr
- Nic Nicosia
- Joe Zucker
- William T. Wiley
- Phillip Maberry
- Italo Scanga
- Bill Viola
- Ken Feingold
- Lance Kiland
- T. L. Solien
- Bruce Charlesworth
- Ernie Gehr
- James Benning
- Richard Artschwager
- Max Neuhaus
- Stuart Sherman
- Edin Velez
- Daniel Walworth
- Barry Gerson
- Keith Haring
- Jenny Holzer
- Mary Lucier
- David Salle
- Sandy Moore
- Judy Rifka
- R. M. Fischer
- Eric Fischl
- Shalom Gorewitz
- Julian Schnabel
- Mathew Geller
- Ericka Beckman
- Susan Rothenberg
- Robert Longo
- Ken Kobland
- Pat Steir
- Barbara Kruger
- Cindy Sherman
- Martha Haslanger
- Nancy Graves
- Frank Stella
- Nam June Paik
- Mike Glier
- Shigeko Kubota
- Vivienne Dick
- David Haxton
- Leon Golub
- Barbara Buckner
- Jasper Johns
- William Crozier
- Louise Bourgeois
- John Coplans
- Juan Downey
- Jackie Winsor
- Gary Hill
- Mark Tansey
- Bill Lundberg
- Jean-Michel Basquiat
- Oliver Jackson
- Robert Colescott
- Howard Fried
- Warren Sonbert
- Bruce Conner
- Doug Hall
- Ellen Brooks
- John Baldessari
- Robert Breer
- Eileen Cowin
- Jonathan Borofsky
- George Rodart
- Joan Mitchell
- Robert Mangold

== 1985 ==
- Joel-Peter Witkin
- Robert Yarber
- Gary Hill
- Doug Anderson
- Jon Kessler
- Perry Hoberman
- Jack Goldstein
- Jo Anne Carson
- Ed Paschke
- Robert H. Hudson
- Jill Giegerich
- Kim MacConnel
- Dan Reeves
- Larry Gottheim
- Bill Viola
- Robert Therrien
- Mike Kelley
- Ken Feingold
- Douglas Davis
- Nan Goldin
- Pooh Kaye
- Sherrie Levine
- Richard Prince
- Jenny Holzer
- David Salle
- Sandy Moore
- Frank Majore
- Robert Mangold
- Joan Jonas
- Dara Birnbaum
- Lynne Tillman
- Eric Fischl
- Jane Aaron
- Ned Smyth
- Terry Winters
- Sheila McLaughlin
- John Newman
- Ericka Beckman
- Laurie Simmons
- Susan Rothenberg
- Ken Jacobs
- Ken Kobland
- David Wojnarowicz
- Barbara Kruger
- Liz Phillips
- Cindy Sherman
- Sarah Charlesworth
- Douglas Ashford
- Charles Atlas
- Donald Judd
- James Casebere
- Peter B. Hutton
- Lizzie Borden
- Robert Ashley
- Holly Fisher
- Mel Kendrick
- Julie Ault
- Tim Rollins
- Tom Otterness
- Bryan Hunt
- John Duff
- Gregory Amenoff
- Elizabeth Murray
- Lyn Blumenthal
- Jasper Johns
- Carroll Dunham
- Elisabeth Ross
- Juan Downey
- Mundy McLaughlin
- Robert Kushner
- Jedd Garet
- Kenny Scharf
- Rodney Alan Greenblat
- Ed Emshwiller
- Bruce Nauman
- Peter Rose
- Warren Sonbert
- Doug Hall
- Woody Vasulka
- Morgan Fisher
- Charles Garabedian
- Norman Yonemoto
- John Baldessari
- Robert Breer
- James Surls
- Bruce Yonemoto
- TODT

== 1987 ==
- Richard Artschwager
- Tina Barney
- Judith Barry
- David Bates
- Ross Bleckner
- Louise Bourgeois
- John Chamerlain
- Clegg & Guttmann
- George Condo
- Willem de Kooning
- Nancy Dwyer
- R.M. Fischer
- Louise Fishman
- Robert Greene
- Peter Halley
- Robert Helm
- Neil Jenney
- Roberto Juarez
- Jeff Koons
- Joseph Kosuth
- Barbara Kruger
- Annette Lemieux
- Sol LeWitt
- Robert Lobe
- Jim Lutes
- McDermott & McGough
- Stephen Mueller
- Bruce Nauman
- Nam June Paik
- Izhar Patkin
- Judy Pfaff
- Lari Pittman
- Richard Prince
- Edward Ruscha
- Robert Ryman
- Alan Saret
- Julian Schnabel
- The Starn Twins
- Donald Sultan
- Philip Taaffe
- Richard Tuttle
- Bruce Weber
- Grahame Weinbren and Roberta Friedman
- Terry Winters

== 1989 ==
- Andrew Noren
- Sherry Millner
- Ernest Larsen
- Larry Gottheim
- Rea Tajiri
- Joan Nelson
- Daniel Eisenberg
- Martin Puryear
- Hirsch Perlman
- Cary Smith
- Charles Ray
- Hans Breder
- Tony Oursler
- Mike Kelley
- Chris Burden
- Liz Larner
- John Arvanites
- Cindy Bernard
- Tom Wudl
- Ashley Bickerton
- Scott Sinkler
- Ray Smith
- Francesc Torres
- Michael Byron
- Jeff Koons
- Mark Innerst
- Ken Feingold
- Sherrie Levine
- Mel Ziegler
- Andrew Spence
- April Gornik
- Sandy Moore
- Joel Shapiro
- Martha Rosler
- Martha Diamond
- Jane Aaron
- Ross Bleckner
- Kate Ericson
- Geralyn Donohue
- Joan Wallace
- Brice Marden
- Abigail Child
- Michele Zalopany
- Leslie Thornton
- Chris Macdonald
- William Wegman
- Christopher Wool
- Jason Simon
- Nam June Paik
- Sachiko Hamada
- Jon Jost
- Renee Tajima
- Robert Gober
- Su Friedrich
- Donald Baechler
- Christine Choy
- Matt Mullican
- Mary Heilmann
- Meg Webster
- David Reed
- Allan McCollum
- Erik Levine
- Barbara Hammer
- Julia Scher
- Saint Clair Cemin
- Victor Masayesva Jr.
- Constance DeJong
- Eleanor Antin
- Nathaniel Dorsky
- Deborah Oropallo
- Michael Wallin
- Chip Lord
- Linda Klosky
- Steina Vasulka
- Woody Vasulka
- Gary Hill

== 1991 ==
- Celia Álvarez Muñoz
- Richard Misrach
- Cady Noland
- Robert Rauschenberg
- Wendy Jacob
- Jeanne Dunning
- Bill Fontana
- Joseph Glasco
- Luis Jimenez
- Sally Mann
- Jim Shaw
- Mike Kelley
- Ed Moses
- Larry Johnson
- Carlos Alfonzo
- Philip Taaffe
- Jessica Stockholder
- Chuck Close
- Cy Twombly
- Philip Pearlstein
- Joseph Santore
- Keith Haring
- Allen Ruppersberg
- John Miller
- David Salle
- Peter McGough
- Ellsworth Kelly
- Roy Lichtenstein
- Eric Fischl
- Julian Schnabel
- Rona Pondick
- Peter Halley
- Roni Horn
- Jessica Diamond
- Glenn Ligon
- Lorna Simpson
- Laurie Simmons
- Alex Katz
- Vito Acconci
- David Wojnarowicz
- Pat Steir
- Cindy Sherman
- Thomas Lanigan-Schmidt
- Louise Lawler
- Ellen Phelan
- Frank Stella
- Tim Rollins
- Mary Kelly
- Elizabeth Murray
- Donald Lipski
- Rebecca Purdum
- Kiki Smith
- Jasper Johns
- Philip Smith
- John Coplans
- Adam Fuss
- Félix González-Torres
- Robert Gober
- Carroll Dunham
- Gary Hill
- Christian Marclay
- Mark Tansey
- Alex Webb
- Jennifer Bartlett
- David McDermott
- Carrie Mae Weems
- Alan Rath
- Bruce Nauman
- Nayland Blake
- Dawn Fryling
- Joan Mitchell
- Keith Sanborn

== 1993 ==
- Miguel Gandert
- Julie Dash
- Trinh T. Minh-ha
- Peter Cain
- Art Jones
- Renée Green
- George Sosa
- Sue Williams
- Simon Leung
- Spike Lee
- Alison Saar
- Sadie Benning
- Kevin Wolff
- Jimmie Durham
- Willie Varela
- Raymond Pettibon
- Jean-Pierre Forin
- James Luna
- Leone and Macdonald
- Bill Viola
- Peter Sellars
- Marco Williams
- Allan Sekula
- William Jones
- Mike Kelley
- Timothy Martin
- Charles Ray
- George Holliday
- Bruce Yonemoto
- Christopher Münch
- Lari Pittman
- Daniel Joseph Martinez
- Janice Tanaka
- Nan Goldin
- Donna Golden
- Robbie McCauley
- Donald Moffett
- Shu Lea Cheang
- Francesc Torres
- Pepon Osorio
- Anne Lobst
- Nancy Spero
- Mac Wellman
- Ida Applebroog
- Peter Campus
- Jennifer Macdonald
- Mark A. Aubert
- Coco Fusco
- Glenn Ligon
- Lorna Simpson
- Tom Poole
- Gary Simmons
- Zoe Leonard
- Mark Rappaport
- Lucy Sexton
- Fred Wilson
- Cyrille Phipps
- Elizabeth LeCompte
- John Kelly
- Cindy Sherman
- Andrea Fraser
- Charles Atlas
- Guillermo Gómez-Peña
- Jack Pierson
- Julie Taymor
- Holly Fisher
- Maureen Connor
- James Hatch
- Kiki Smith
- Hillary Leone
- Suzanne McClelland
- Randolph Huff
- Robert Gober
- Matthew Barney
- Camille Billops
- Michael Joaquin Grey
- Roddy Bogawa
- Byron Kim
- Janine Antoni
- Christine Chang
- Sophie Calle
- Karen Kilimnik
- Cheryl Dunye
- Ernie Gehr
- Marga Gomez
- Jonathan Robinson
- Lourdes Portillo
- Jeanne C. Finley
- Barbara Hammer
- Kip Fulbeck
- Pat Ward Williams
- Greg Shepard
- Gary Hill
- Chris Burden
- Norman Yonemoto

== 1995 ==
- Karim Aïnouz
- Lawrence Andrews
- David Armstrong
- Hima B
- Matthew Barney
- James Bishop
- Roddy Bogawa
- Gregg Bordowitz
- Stan Brakhage
- Emily Breer
- Peter Cain
- Shu Lea Cheang
- Cheryl Donegan
- Stan Douglas
- Carroll Dunham
- Nicole Eisenman
- Jeanne C. Finley
- Julio Galán
- Ellen Gallagher
- Harry Gamboa, Jr.
- Nan Goldin
- DeeDee Halleck
- Thomas Allen Harris
- Bessie Harvey
- Todd Haynes
- Peter Hutton
- Ken Jacobs
- Tom Kalin
- Mike Kelley
- Toba Khedoori
- Harriet Korman
- Greer Lankton
- Elizabeth LeCompte
- Siobhan Liddell
- Judy Linn
- Andrew Lord
- Brice Marden
- Helen Marden
- Agnes Martin
- Paul McCarthy
- David McDermott
- Raphael Montañez Ortiz
- Stephen Mueller
- Catherine Murphy
- Frances Negrón-Muntaner
- Andrew Noren
- Catherine Opie
- John O'Reilly
- Gabriel Orozco
- Jack Pierson
- Lari Pittman
- Scott Rankin
- Charles Ray
- Michael Rees
- Jason Rhoades
- Nancy Rubins
- Peter Saul
- Cindy Sherman
- Richard Serra
- Gretchen Stoeltje
- Margie Strosser
- Philip Taaffe
- Diana Thater
- Rirkrit Tiravanija
- Alan Turner
- Cy Twombly
- Willie Varela
- Barry Le Va
- Jeff Wall
- Nari Ward
- Lawrence Weiner
- Sue Williams
- Terry Winters
- Andrea Zittel
- Joe Zucker
- David Knudsvig
- Milton Resnick
- Sam Reveles
- Leslie Thornton
- Robert Ryman
- Joe Gibbons
- Christian Schumann
- Peggy Ahwesh
- Jim Jarmusch
- Peter McGough
- Frank Moore
- Lewis Klahr
- Jane Freilicher

== 1997 ==
- Doug Aitken
- Roman Anikushin
- Michael Ashkin
- Robert Attanasio
- Burt Barr
- Zoe Beloff
- Douglas Blau
- Louise Bourgeois
- Chris Burden
- Vija Celmins
- Charles Burnett
- Abigail Child
- Francesco Clemente
- Beth Coleman
- Bruce Conner
- Philip-Lorca diCorcia
- Bryan Crocket
- Cheryl Dunye
- Sam Easterson
- Wendy Ewald
- William Forsythe
- Leah Gilliam
- Michael Gitlin
- Howard Goldkrand
- Félix González-Torres
- Dan Graham
- David Hammons
- Ilya Kabakov
- Martin Kersels
- Ken Jacobs
- Annette Lawrence
- Iara Lee
- Zoe Leonard
- Sharon Lockhart
- Charles Long
- Kristin Lucas
- Kerry James Marshall
- Antonio Martorell
- Paul McCarthy
- Amanda Miller
- Paul D. Miller
- Christopher Münch
- Bruce Nauman
- Gabriel Orozco
- Tony Oursler
- Bob Paris
- Laura Parnes
- Jennifer Pastor
- Raymond Pettibon
- Richard Phillips
- Lari Pittman
- Richard Prince
- Charles Ray
- Jason Rhoades
- Matthew Ritchie
- Aaron Rose
- Edward Ruscha
- John Schabel
- Katy Schimert
- Glen Seator
- Paul Shambroom
- David Sherman
- Shahzia Sikander
- Shashwati Talukdar
- Diana Thater
- Cecilia Vicuña
- Kara Walker
- T. J. Wilcox
- Sue Williams
- Robert Wilson

== 2000 ==
The curators were Whitney museum director Maxwell L. Anderson, Michael Auping, Valerie Cassel, Hugh M. Davies, Jane Farver, Andrea Miller-Keller, and Lawrence R. Rinder.

- Dennis Adams
- Doug Aitken
- Ghada Amer
- Mark Amerika
- Lutz Bacher
- Craig Baldwin
- Lew Baldwin
- Rebecca Baron
- Rina Banerjee
- Vanessa Beecroft
- Rolf Belgum
- Ben Benjamin
- Sadie Benning
- Dawoud Bey
- Robin Bernat
- Linda Besemer
- Jeremy Blake
- Chakaia Booker
- Anthony Discenza Born
- M. W. Burns
- Ingrid Calame
- Luis Camnitzer
- Jem Cohen
- John Coplans
- Petah Coyne
- John Currin
- E.V. Day
- Thornton Dial
- Kim Dingle
- Tara Donovan
- Nathaniel Dorsky
- James Drake
- Theresa Duncan
- Leandro Erlich
- Marcos Ramírez Erre
- Vernon Fisher
- Suzan Frecon
- Brian Fridge
- Dara Friedman
- Joe Gibbons
- Robert Gober
- Jill Godmilow
- Ken Goldberg
- Kojo Griffin
- Joseph Grigely
- Cai Guo-Qiang
- Hans Haacke
- Trenton Doyle Hancock
- Joseph Havel
- Salomón Huerta
- Arthur Jafa
- Michael Joo
- Kurt Kauper
- Silvia Kolbowski
- Harmony Korine
- Louise Lawler
- Ruth Leitman
- Annette Lemieux
- Les LeVeque
- Sharon Lockhart
- William de Lottie
- Anne Makepeace
- Iñigo Manglano-Ovalle
- Joseph Marioni
- Josiah McElheny
- Franco Mondini-Ruiz
- Errol Morris
- Mandy Morrison
- Vik Muniz
- Shirin Neshat
- Nic Nicosia
- Paul Pfeiffer
- Carl and Karen Pope
- Walid Ra'ad
- Jennifer Reeder
- Laurie Reid
- Kay Rosen
- Michal Rovner
- Roman de Salvo
- Katherine Sherwood
- John F. Simon Jr.
- Al Souza
- Darcey Steinke
- Elisabeth Subrin
- Chris Sullivan
- Sarah Sze
- T. Kim-Trang Tran
- Richard Tuttle
- Ayanna U'Dongo
- Chris Verene
- Annette Weintraub
- Yvonne Welbon
- Krzysztof Wodiczko
- Yukinori Yanagi
- Lisa Yuskavage

== 2002 ==
- Peggy Ahwesh
- Bosmat Alon
- José Alvarez
- Maryanne Amacher
- Irit Batsry
- Robert Beavers
- Zoe Beloff
- Sanford Biggers
- Susan Black
- Jeremy Blake
- Gogol Bordello
- AA Bronson
- James Buckhouse
- Javier Cambre
- Jim Campbell
- Karin Campbell
- Peter Campus
- Praxis (Delia Bajo and Brainard Carey)
- Vija Celmins
- Chan Chao
- Richard Chartier
- Tony Cokes
- Destroy All Monsters Collective
- Stephen Dean
- Keith Edmier
- Tirtza Even
- Omer Fast
- Vincent Fecteau
- Ken Feingold
- Robert Fenz
- Mary Flanagan
- Salon de Fleurus
- Glen Fogel
- Forcefield
- Benjamin Fry
- Brian Frye
- Josh On & Futurefarmers
- David Gatten
- Joe Gibbons
- Luis Gispert
- Janine Gordon
- The Atlas Group
- Alfred Guzzetti
- Trenton Doyle Hancock
- Rachel Harrison
- Tim Hawkinson
- Arturo Herrera
- Evan Holloway
- Dennis Hopper
- Zhang Huan
- Peter Hutton
- Ken Jacobs
- Gregor Asch (DJ Olive the Audio Janitor)
- Christian Jankowski
- Lisa Jevbratt/C5
- Yun-Fei Ji
- Chris Johanson
- Miranda July
- Yael Kanarek
- Margaret Kilgallen
- Diane Kitchen
- John Klima
- Mark LaPore
- Robert Lazzarini
- John Leaños
- Margot Lovejoy
- Vera Lutter
- Christian Marclay
- Ari Marcopoulos
- Bruce McClure
- Conor McGrady
- Meredith Monk
- Julie Moos
- Tracie Morris
- Mark Napier
- Robert Nideffer
- Andrew Noren
- Roxy Paine
- Hirsch Perlman
- Leighton Pierce
- William Pope.L
- Seth Price
- Walid Raad
- Luis Recoder
- Erwin Redl
- Marina Rosenfeld
- Keith Sanborn
- Peter Sarkisian
- Judith Schaechter
- Collier Schorr
- Chemi Rosado Seijo
- silt
- Lorna Simpson
- Kiki Smith
- Gerry Snyder
- Stom Sogo
- Phil Solomon
- Kimsooja
- Scott Stark
- Steina
- Rural Studio
- Brian Tolle
- Rosie Lee Tompkins
- Lauretta Vinciarelli
- Stephen Vitiello
- Archive (Chris Kubick and Anne Walsh)
- Chris Ware
- Ouattara Watts
- Peter Williams
- Anne Wilson
- Lebbeus Woods
- Fred Worden
- Jennifer Zackin
- John Zurier

== 2004 ==
The curators were Chrissie Iles, Shamim M. Momin, Debra Singer.

- Marina Abramović
- Laylah Ali
- David Altmejd
- Antony and the Johnsons
- Cory Arcangel
- assume vivid astro focus
- Hernan Bas
- Dike Blair
- Jeremy Blake
- Mel Bochner
- Andrea Bowers
- Slater Bradley
- Stan Brakhage
- Cecily Brown
- Tom Burr
- Ernesto Caivano
- Maurizio Cattelan
- Pip Chodorov
- Liz Craft
- Santiago Cucullu
- Amy Cutler
- Taylor Davis
- Sue de Beer
- Lecia Dole-Recio
- Sam Durant
- Bradley Eros
- Spencer Finch
- Rob Fischer
- Kim Fisher
- Morgan Fisher
- Harrell Fletcher
- James Fotopoulos
- Barnaby Furnas
- Sandra Gibson
- Jack Goldstein
- Katy Grannan
- Sam Green
- Bill Siegel
- Katie Grinnan
- Wade Guyton
- Mark Handforth
- Alex Hay
- David Hockney
- Jim Hodges
- Christian Holstad
- Roni Horn
- Craigie Horsfield
- Peter Hutton
- Emily Jacir
- Isaac Julien
- Miranda July
- Glenn Kaino
- Mary Kelly
- Terence Koh
- Yayoi Kusama
- Noémie Lafrance
- Lee Mingwei
- Golan Levin
- Sharon Lockhart
- Robert Longo
- Los Super Elegantes
- Robert Mangold
- Virgil Marti
- Cameron Martin (artist)
- Anthony McCall
- Paul McCarthy
- Bruce McClure
- Julie Mehretu
- Jonas Mekas
- Aleksandra Mir
- Dave Muller
- Julie Murray
- Julie Atlas Muz
- Andrew Noren
- Robyn O'Neil
- Jim O'Rourke
- Catherine Opie
- Laura Owens
- Raymond Pettibon
- Elizabeth Peyton
- Chloe Piene
- Jack Pierson
- Richard Prince
- Luis Recoder
- Liisa Roberts
- Dario Robleto
- Matthew Ronay
- Aïda Ruilova
- James Siena
- Amy Sillman
- Simparch
- Zak Smith
- Yutaka Sone
- Alec Soth
- Deborah Stratman
- Catherine Sullivan
- Eve Sussman
- Julianne Swartz
- Erick Swenson
- Fred Tomaselli
- Tracy + the Plastics
- Jim Trainor
- Tam Van Tran
- The Velvet-Strike Team (Anne Marie Schleiner, Joan Leandre, Brody Condon)
- Banks Violette
- Eric Wesley
- Olav Westphalen
- TJ Wilcox
- Andrea Zittel

== 2006 ==
The 73rd Whitney Biennial. The curators were Philippe Vergne and Chrissie Iles.

- Allora & Calzadilla
- Dawolu Jabari Anderson
- Kenneth Anger
- Dominic Angerame
- Christina Battle
- James Benning
- Bernadette Corporation
- Amy Blakemore
- Louise Bourque
- Mark Bradford
- Troy Brauntuch
- Anthony Burdin
- George Butler
- Carter
- Carolina Caycedo
- Center for Land Use Interpretation
- Paul Chan
- Lori Cheatle
- Ira Cohen
- Martha Colburn
- Dan Colen
- Anne Collier
- Tony Conrad
- Critical Art Ensemble
- Jamal Cyrus
- Miles Davis
- Deep Dish TV Network
- Lucas DeGiulio
- Mark DiSuvero
- Peter Doig
- Trisha Donnelly
- Jimmie Durham
- Kenya Evans
- Urs Fischer
- David Gatten
- Joe Gibbons
- Robert Gober
- Deva Graf
- Dan Graham
- Tony Oursler
- Rodney Graham
- Laurent P. Berger
- Bruce Odland
- Japanther
- Rodney Graham
- Hannah Greely
- Mark Grotjahn
- Jay Heikes
- Doug Henry
- Pierre Huyghe
- Dorothy Iannone
- Matthew Day Jackson
- Cameron Jamie
- Natalie Jeremijenko
- Phil Taylor
- Daniel Johnston
- Lewis Klahr
- Jutta Koether
- Andrew Lampert
- Lisa Lapinski
- Liz Larner
- Hanna Liden
- Jeanne Liotta
- Marie Losier
- Florian Maier-Aichen
- Monica Majoli
- Yuri Masnyj
- T. Kelly Mason
- Diana Thater
- Taylor Mead
- Adam McEwen
- Josephine Meckseper
- Marilyn Minter
- Momus
- Matthew Monahan
- JP Munro
- Jesus 'Bubu' Negrón
- Kori Newkirk
- Todd Norsten
- Jim O'Rourke
- Otabenga Jones & Associates
- Steven Parrino
- Ed Paschke
- Mathias Poledna
- Rob Pruitt
- Jennifer Reeves
- Gedi Sibony
- Richard Serra
- Jennie Smith
- Dash Snow
- Michael Snow
- Reena Spaulings
- Rudolf Stingel
- Angela Strassheim
- Zoe Strauss
- Studio Film Club Sturtevant
- Billy Sullivan
- Spencer Sweeney
- Rirkrit Tiravanija
- Ryan Trecartin
- Chris Vasell
- Francesco Vezzoli
- Kelley Walker
- Nari Ward
- Christopher Williams
- Jordan Wolfson
- Daisy Wright
- Gallery Wrong
- Aaron Young

== 2008 ==
The 74th Whitney Biennial.

- Rita Ackermann
- Natalia Almada
- Edgar Arceneaux
- Fia Backstrom
- John Baldessari
- Robert Bechtle
- Walead Beshty
- Carol Bove
- Joe Bradley
- Matthew Brannon
- Bozidar Brazda
- Olaf Breuning
- Jedidiah Caesar
- William Cordova
- Dexter Sinister
- Harry Dodge and Stanya Kahn
- Shannon Ebner
- Gardar Eide Einarsson
- Roe Ethridge
- Kevin Jerome Everson
- Omer Fast
- Robert Fenz
- Coco Fusco
- Gang Gang Dance
- Amy Granat
- Drew Heitzler
- Rashawn Griffin
- Adler Guerrier
- MK Guth
- Fritz Haeg
- Rachel Harrison
- Ellen Harvey
- Mary Heilmann
- Leslie Hewitt
- Patrick Hill
- William E. Jones
- Karen Kilimnik
- Alice Könitz
- Louise Lawler
- Spike Lee
- Sherrie Levine
- Charles Long
- Lucky Dragons
- Daniel Joseph Martinez
- Corey McCorkle
- Rodney McMillian
- Julia Meltzer
- David Thorne
- Jennifer Montgomery
- Olivier Mosset
- Matt Mullican
- Neighborhood Public Radio
- Ruben Ochoa
- DJ Olive
- Mitzi Pederson
- Kembra Pfahler
- Seth Price
- Stephen Prina
- Adam Putnam
- Michael Queenland
- Jason Rhoades
- Ry Rocklen
- Bert Rodriguez
- Marina Rosenfeld
- Amanda Ross-Ho
- Mika Rottenberg
- Heather Rowe
- Eduardo Sarabia
- Melanie Schiff
- Amie Siegel
- Lisa Sigal
- Gretchen Skogerson
- Michael Smith
- Agathe Snow
- Frances Stark
- Mika Tajima
- Javier Téllez
- Cheyney Thompson
- Mungo Thomson
- Leslie Thornton
- Phoebe Washburn
- James Welling
- Mario Ybarra Jr.

== 2010 ==
The 75th Whitney Biennial/Annual ran February 25 to May 30, 2010. The curators were Francesco Bonami and associate Gary Carrion-Murayari.

- David Adamo
- Richard Aldrich
- Michael Asher
- Tauba Auerbach
- Nina Berman
- Huma Bhabha
- Josh Brand
- The Bruce High Quality Foundation
- James Casebere
- Edgar Cleijne
- Ellen Gallagher
- Dawn Clements
- George Condo
- Sarah Crowner
- Verne Dawson
- Julia Fish
- Roland Flexner
- Suzan Frecon
- Maureen Gallace
- Theaster Gates
- Kate Gilmore
- Hannah Greely
- Jesse Aron Green
- Robert Grosvenor
- Sharon Hayes
- Thomas Houseago
- Alex Hubbard
- Jessica Jackson Hutchins
- Jeffrey Inaba
- Martin Kersels
- Jim Lutes
- Babette Mangolte
- Curtis Mann
- Ari Marcopoulos
- Daniel McDonald
- Josephine Meckseper
- Rashaad Newsome
- Kelly Nipper
- Lorraine O'Grady
- R. H. Quaytman
- Charles Ray
- Emily Roysdon
- Aki Sasamoto
- Aurel Schmidt
- Scott Short
- Stephanie Sinclair
- Ania Soliman
- Storm Tharp
- Tam Tran
- Kerry Tribe
- Piotr Uklanski
- Lesley Vance
- Marianne Vitale
- Erika Vogt
- Pae White
- Robert Williams

== 2012 ==
The 76th Whitney Biennial/Annual ran March 1 through May 27, 2012. It was curated by Elisabeth Sussman and Jay Sanders. They co-curated the film program with Thomas Beard and Ed Halter, co-founders of Light Industry, a venue for film and electronic art in Brooklyn.

- Kai Althoff
- Thom Andersen
- Charles Atlas
- Lutz Bacher
- Forrest Bess (by Robert Gober)
- Michael Clark
- Cameron Crawford
- Moyra Davey
- Liz Deschenes
- Nathaniel Dorsky
- Nicole Eisenman
- Kevin Jerome Everson
- Vincent Fecteau
- Andrea Fraser
- LaToya Ruby Frazier
- K8 Hardy
- Richard Hawkins
- Werner Herzog
- Jerome Hiler
- Matt Hoyt
- Dawn Kasper
- Mike Kelley
- John Kelsey
- John Knight
- Jutta Koether
- George Kuchar
- Laida Lertxundi
- Kate Levant
- Sam Lewitt
- Joanna Malinowska
- Andrew Masullo
- Nick Mauss
- Richard Maxwell
- Sarah Michelson
- Alicia Hall Moran and Jason Moran
- Laura Poitras
- Matt Porterfield
- Luther Price
- Lucy Raven
- The Red Krayola
- Kelly Reichardt
- Elaine Reichek
- Michael Robinson
- Georgia Sagri
- Michael E. Smith
- Tom Thayer
- Wu Tsang
- Oscar Tuazon
- Gisèle Vienne, Dennis Cooper, Stephen O'Malley, and Peter Rehberg
- Frederick Wiseman
- Vincent Gallo
- Vanessa Place

== 2014 ==
The 77th Whitney Biennial was on view March 7 through May 25, 2014. The exhibition was curated by Stuart Comer, Anthony Elms, and Michelle Grabner.

- Academy Records and Matt Hanner
- Terry Adkins
- Etel Adnan
- Alma Allen
- Ei Arakawa and Carissa Rodriguez
- Uri Aran
- Robert Ashley and Alex Waterman
- Michel Auder
- Lisa Anne Auerbach
- Julie Ault
- Darren Bader
- Kevin Beasley
- Gretchen Bender
- Stephen Berens
- Dawoud Bey
- Jennifer Bornstein
- Andrew Bujalski
- Elijah Burgher
- Lucien Castaing-Taylor, Véréna Paravel, and Sensory Ethnography Lab
- Sarah Charlesworth
- Yve Laris Cohen
- Critical Practices Inc.
- Matthew Deleget
- David Diao
- Zackary Drucker and Rhys Ernst
- Paul Druecke
- Jimmie Durham
- Rochelle Feinstein
- Radamés "Juni" Figueroa
- Morgan Fisher
- Louise Fishman
- Victoria Fu
- Gaylen Gerber with David Hammons, Sherrie Levine, and Trevor Shimizu
- Jeff Gibson
- Tony Greene curated by Richard Hawkins and Catherine Opie
- Joseph Grigely
- Miguel Gutierrez
- Karl Haendel
- Philip Hanson
- Jonn Herschend
- Sheila Hicks
- Channa Horwitz
- HowDoYouSayYaminAfrican?
- Susan Howe
- Jacqueline Humphries
- Gary Indiana
- Doug Ischar
- Carol Jackson
- Travis Jeppesen
- Alex Jovanovich
- Angie Keefer
- Ben Kinmont
- Shio Kusaka
- Chris Larson
- Diego Leclery
- Zoe Leonard
- Tony Lewis
- Pam Lins
- Fred Lonidier
- Ken Lum
- Shana Lutker
- Dashiell Manley
- John Mason
- Keith Mayerson
- Suzanne McClelland
- Dave McKenzie
- Bjarne Melgaard
- Rebecca Morris
- Joshua Mosley
- My Barbarian (Malik Gaines, Jade Gordon, and Alexandro Segade)
- Dona Nelson
- Ken Okiishi
- Pauline Oliveros
- Joel Otterson
- Laura Owens
- Paul P.
- taisha paggett
- Charlemagne Palestine
- Public Collectors
- Sara Greenberger Rafferty
- Steve Reinke with Jessie Mott
- David Robbins
- Sterling Ruby
- Miljohn Ruperto
- Jacolby Satterwhite
- Peter Schuyff
- Allan Sekula
- Semiotext(e)
- Sienna Shields
- Amy Sillman
- Valerie Snobeck and Catherine Sullivan
- A.L. Steiner
- Emily Sundblad
- Ricky Swallow
- Tony Tasset
- Sergei Tcherepnin
- Triple Canopy
- Philip Vanderhyden
- Pedro Vélez
- Charline von Heyl
- David Foster Wallace
- Dan Walsh
- Donelle Woolford
- Molly Zuckerman-Hartung

== 2017 ==
The 2017 Biennial is the first to take place in the museum's much larger new location in the Meatpacking District. With 63 participants the exhibition runs from March 17 until June 11, and is co-curated by Christopher Y. Lew and Mia Locks.

- Zarouhie Abdalian
- Basma Alsharif
- Jo Baer
- Eric Baudelaire
- Robert Beavers
- Larry Bell
- Matt Browning
- Susan Cianciolo
- Mary Helena Clark
- John Divola
- Celeste Dupuy-Spencer
- Rafa Esparza
- Kevin Jerome Everson
- GCC (Nanu al-Hamad, Abdullah al-Mutairi, Aziz Alqatami, Barrak Alzaid, Khalid al-Gharaballi, Amal Khalaf, Fatima al-Qadiri, Monira al-Qadiri)
- Oto Gillen
- Samara Golden
- Casey Gollan and Victoria Sobel
- Irena Haiduk
- Lyle Ashton Harris
- Tommy Hartung
- Porpentine Charity Heartscape
- Sky Hopinka
- Shara Hughes
- Aaron Flint Jamison
- KAYA (Kerstin Brätsch and Debo Eilers)
- Jon Kessler
- James N. Kienitz Wilkins
- Ajay Kurian
- Deana Lawson
- An-My Lê
- Leigh Ledare
- Dani Leventhal
- Tala Madani
- Park McArthur
- Harold Mendez
- Carrie Moyer
- Ulrike Müller
- Julien Nguyen
- Tuan Andrew Nguyen
- Raúl de Nieves
- Aliza Nisenbaum
- Occupy Museums (Arthur Polendo, Imani Jacqueline Brown, Kenneth Pietrobono, Noah Fischer and Tal Beery)
- Pope.L
- Postcommodity (Raven Chacon, Cristóbal Martínez, Kade L. Twist)
- Puppies Puppies
- Asad Raza
- Jessi Reaves
- John Riepenhoff
- Chemi Rosado-Seijo
- Cameron Rowland
- Beatriz Santiago Muñoz
- Dana Schutz
- Cauleen Smith
- Frances Stark
- Maya Stovall
- Henry Taylor
- Torey Thornton
- Leslie Thornton and James Richards
- Kaari Upson
- Kamasi Washington
- Leilah Weinraub
- Jordan Wolfson
- Anicka Yi

== 2019 ==
The Biennial participating artists were announced in February 2019. Curated by Rujeko Hockley and Jane Panetta, the show is open from May 17 to September 22, 2019. One artist, Michael Rakowitz, turned down the invitation to participate in response to the presence of the Whitney's vice chair at the time, Warren Kanders, CEO of Safariland. In mid-July 2019, eight artists requested for their work to be withdrawn from the 2019 Whitney Biennial in response to additional concerns over Safariland's manufacturing of tear gas and police equipment. Kanders resigned from his position on the board July 25, 2019.

- Eddie Arroyo (withdrawn)
- Korakrit Arunanondchai (withdrawn)
- Olga Balema
- Morgan Bassichis
- Blitz Bazawule
- Alexandra Bell
- Brian Belott
- Meriem Bennani (withdrawn)
- Robert Bittenbender
- Lucas Blalock
- Garrett Bradley
- Milano Chow
- Colectivo Los Ingrávidos
- Thirza Cuthand
- John Edmonds
- Nicole Eisenman (withdrawn)
- Janiva Ellis
- Kota Ezawa
- Brendan Fernandes
- FIERCE and Paper Tiger Television
- Marcus Fischer
- Forensic Architecture (withdrawn)
- Ellie Ga
- Nicholas Galanin (withdrawn)
- Sofía Gallisá Muriente
- Jeffrey Gibson
- Todd Gray
- Sam Green
- Barbara Hammer
- Ilana Harris-Babou
- Matthew Angelo Harrison
- Curran Hatleberg
- Madeline Hollander
- Iman Issa
- Tomashi Jackson
- Steffani Jemison
- Adam Khalil, Zack Khalil, and Jackson Polys
- Christine Sun Kim (withdrawn)
- Josh Kline
- Autumn Knight
- Carolyn Lazard
- Maia Ruth Lee
- Simone Leigh
- Daniel Lind-Ramos
- James Luna
- Eric N. Mack
- Calvin Marcus
- Tiona Nekkia McClodden
- Troy Michie
- Joe Minter
- Keegan Monaghan
- Caroline Monnet
- Darius Clark Monroe
- Ragen Moss
- Sahra Motalebi
- Marlon Mullen
- Jeanette Mundt
- Wangechi Mutu
- Las Nietas de Nonó (Lydela Nonó and Michel Nonó)
- Jenn Nkiru
- Laura Ortman
- Jennifer Packer
- nibia pastrana santiago
- Elle Pérez
- Pat Phillips
- Gala Porras-Kim
- Walter Price
- Carissa Rodriguez
- Paul Mpagi Sepuya
- Heji Shin
- Diane Simpson
- Martine Syms
- Kyle Thurman
- Mariana Valencia
- Agustina Woodgate (withdrawn)

== 2022 ==
The 2021 Whitney Biennial was postponed till 2022 due to the COVID-19 pandemic. The 2022 Whitney Biennial was curated by David Breslin and Adrienne Edwards.

- Lisa Alvarado
- Harold Ancart
- Mónica Arreola
- Emily Barker
- Yto Barrada
- Rebecca Belmore
- Jonathan Berger
- Nayland Blake
- Cassandra Press
- Theresa Hak Kyung Cha
- Raven Chacon
- Leidy Churchman
- Tony Cokes
- Jacky Connolly
- Matt Connors
- Alex Da Corte
- Aria Dean
- Danielle Dean
- Buck Ellison
- Alia Farid
- Coco Fusco
- Ellen Gallagher
- A Gathering of the Tribes/Steve Cannon
- Cy Gavin
- Adam Gordon
- Renée Green
- Pao Houa Her
- EJ Hill
- Alfredo Jaar
- Rindon Johnson
- Ivy Kwan Arce and Julie Tolentino
- Ralph Lemon
- Duane Linklater
- James Little
- Rick Lowe
- Daniel Joseph Martinez
- Dave McKenzie
- Rodney McMillian
- Na Mira
- Alejandro "Luperca" Morales
- Moved by the Motion
- Terence Nance
- Woody De Othello
- Adam Pendleton
- N. H. Pritchard
- Lucy Raven
- Charles Ray
- Jason Rhoades
- Andrew Roberts
- Guadalupe Rosales
- Veronica Ryan
- Rose Salane
- Michael E. Smith
- Sable Elyse Smith
- Awilda Sterling-Duprey
- Rayyane Tabet
- Denyse Thomasos
- Trinh T. Minh-ha
- WangShui
- Eric Wesley
- Dyani White Hawk
- Kandis Williams

== 2024 ==
The Biennial participating artists were announced on January 25, 2024. Titled "Even Better Than The Real Thing," the exhibition was curated by Chrissie Iles and Meg Onli with a performance program co-curated with guest curator Taja Cheek. The show ran from March 20 to August 11, 2024.

- Siku Allooloo
- Holland Andrews
- Eddie Rodolfo Aparicio
- Dora Budor
- Dala Nasser
- Seba Calfuqueo
- Debit (Delia Beatriz)
- Demian DinéYazhi
- Torkwase Dyson
- JJJJJerome Ellis
- Jes Fan
- Nikita Gale
- ektor garcia
- Pippa Garner
- Harmony Hammond
- Christopher Harris
- Sharon Hayes
- Miranda Haymon
- Sarah Hennies
- Holly Herndon & Mat Dryhurst
- Ho Tzu Nyen
- Yasmine Anlan Huang
- Madeleine Hunt-Ehrlich
- Suzanne Jackson
- Isaac Julien
- Lotus L. Kang
- Aron Kantor
- Mary Kelly (artist)
- Suzanne Kite
- Gbenga Komolafe & Tee Park
- Jenni Laiti
- Carolyn Lazard
- Dionne Lee
- Ligia Lewis
- Shuang Li
- Simon Liu
- Mary Lovelace O'Neal
- Cannupa Hanska Luger
- Nyala Moon
- K.R.M. Mooney
- Niillasaš-Jovnna Máreha Juhani Sunná Máret
- Dala Nasser
- Diane Severin Nguyen
- Karyn Oliver
- B. Ingrid Olson
- Eamon Ore-Giron
- Edward_Owens_(filmmaker)
- Sydney Frances Pascal
- People Who Stutter Create
- Julia Phillips
- Mavis Pusey
- Raqs Media Collective
- Riar Rizaldi
- Maja Ruznic
- Ser Serpas
- Rose B. Simpson
- Penelope Spheeris
- P. Staff
- Lada Suomenrinne
- Alex Tatarsky
- Alisi Telengut
- Clarissa Tossin
- Tourmaline (activist)
- Chanelle Tyson
- Zulaa Urchuud
- Charisse Pearlina Weston
- Kiyan Williams
- Carmen Winant
- Takako Yamaguchi
- Constantina Zavitsanos

== 2026 ==
The Biennial participating artists were announced on December 15, 2025. Curated by Marcela Guerrero and Drew Sawyer, the show opened on March 8, 2026.

- Basel Abbas & Ruanne Abou-Rahme
- Kamrooz Aram
- Ash Arder
- Teresa Baker
- Sula Bermudez-Silverman
- Zach Blas
- Enzo Camacho & Ami Lien
- Leo Castañeda
- CFGNY (Daniel Chew, Ten Izu, Kirsten Kilponen, Tin Nguyen)
- Nani Chacon
- Maia Chao
- Joshua Citarella
- Mo Costello
- Taína H. Cruz
- Carmen de Monteflores
- Ali Eyal
- Andrea Fraser
- Mariah Garnett
- Ignacio Gatica
- Jonathan González
- Emilie Louise Gossiaux
- Kainoa Gruspe
- Martine Gutierrez
- Samia Halaby
- Raven Halfmoon
- Nile Harris with Dyer Rhoads
- Aziz Hazara
- Margaret Honda
- Akira Ikezoe
- Mao Ishikawa
- Cooper Jacoby
- David L. Johnson
- kekahi wahi (Sancia Miala Shiba Nash, Drew K. Broderick)
- Young Joon Kwak
- Michelle Lopez
- José Maceda
- Agosto Machado
- Oswaldo Maciá
- Emilio Martínez Poppe
- Isabelle Frances McGuire
- Kimowan Metchewais
- Nour Mobarak
- Erin Jane Nelson
- Precious Okoyomon
- Aki Onda
- Pat Oleszko
- Malcolm Peacock
- Sarah M. Rodriguez
- Gabriela Ruiz
- Jasmin Sian
- Jordan Strafer
- Sung Tieu
- Julio Torres
- Anna Tsouhlarakis
- Johanna Unzueta

== See also ==
- List of Whitney Biennial curators
