= Bittenbender =

Bittenbender is an occupational surname for a cooper, an altered form of German Bittenbinder. It may refer to the following notable people:

- Ada Bittenbender (1848–1925), American lawyer and feminist
- Robert Bittenbender, American mixed media artist

== See also ==
- Bittenbender Covered Bridge, a historic bridge in Pennsylvania, U.S.
