= Malcolm Bailey =

Malcolm Bailey may refer to:

- Malcolm Bailey (footballer, born 1950) (1950–2017), English footballer
- Malcolm Bailey (footballer, born 1937) (1937–2016), English footballer
- Malcolm Bailey (artist) (1947–2011), American artist
