= Eddie Arroyo =

American artist (born 1976)

- Born: 1976; Miami, Florida, U.S.
- Education: Florida International University
- Known for: Landscape painting
- Awards: 2018 Florida Cultural Consortium Visual and Media Artists Fellowship

Eddie Arroyo (born 1976) is an American visual artist working primarily with landscape painting. His canvases often depict urban scenes and local reference points for the South Florida communities as way to comment on economic and social issues such as gentrification, migration, and intergenerational relationships.

== Early life and education ==
Eddie Arroyo was born in Miami and received a BFA in painting from Florida International University in 2001.

== Work ==
Eddie Arroyo's work comments on ideas of urban renewal, city life, and redevelopment in South Florida's Black and Latino communities – Little Haiti and Little Havana neighborhoods among them – and their impacts in the lives of local residents. For instance, images of architectural structures and local small businesses on the wake of being replaced by new buildings and constructions.

Arroyo's painting 5825 NE 2nd Ave., Miami, FL 22137 (2016) was exhibited at the 2019 Whitney Biennial and later acquired by the Whitney Museum. Due to political views, Arroyo was one of eight artists to request his work to be withdrawn from the Whitney Biennial. The 2019 Whitney Biennial was the first to include Miami-based artists after ten years without showcasing artists from the region. Eddie Arroyo was included alongside South Florida fellow artist Augustina Woodgate.

The Bakehouse Art Complex, Wynwood neighborhood, and the Haitian Heritage Museum, Miami, have hosted Eddie Arroyo's solo shows in the past.

He has lectured at New York Academy of Art, New York, and Florida International University's department of Art and Art History, Florida.

== Collections ==
Arroyo's work is included in private and public collections in the United States, such as of the Pérez Art Museum Miami, Florida; Whitney Museum of American Art, New York; Institute of Contemporary Art, Miami, Florida; and Kadist, San Francisco, California.

== Awards and recognition ==
Eddie Arroyo was awarded a 2018 South Florida Cultural Consortium Visual and Media Artists Fellowship.
