= Annette Weintraub =

American new media artist and writer (born 1946)

Annette Weintraub (born 1946) is an American new media artist and writer.

== Education and teaching ==
Annette Weintraub got her B.F.A. at the Cooper Union and her M.F.A. at the University of Pennsylvania, Graduate School of Fine Arts. She lives in New York, where she is Professor of Art and Director of the Robinson Center at City College of New York. She has been associated with City College since 1981.

== Career ==
Annette Weintraub is a media artist whose work focuses on the conceptual representation of architecture and urban space and on the issue of private versus public space. Her complex web projects feature multiple nonlinear storylines constructed using mixed media (commonly video, audio, photography, and text). Weintraub is a pioneer of web-based artwork: her first web work, Realms, was made for Netscape Navigator 1.1, which was released in the early 1990s. Her second web work, Pedestrians (from the mid-1990s) uses scrolling text to reference walking as an entry point into thinking about life in the city. The text is combined with looping GIF animations to create a dynamic nonlinear narrative or "living collage."

Weintraub has been widely shown internationally, with work in the Whitney Biennial (2000), Video Biennal Israel, the International Film Festival Rotterdam, the 5th Biennial of Media and Architecture (Graz, Austria), SIGGRAPH, ISEA, the Museo Nacional de Bellas Artes (Buenos Aires, Argentina), the International Center for Photography (New York), the Everhart Museum (Scranton, Pennsylvania), Heara 8 (Jerusalem), the Atlanta Contemporary Art Center (Georgia), and many others. She has had new works commissioned by Turbulence, the Rushlikon Centre for Global Dialogue, CEPA, and the Whitney Artport website. Her work is in the collections of the Aldrich Museum of Contemporary Art (Connecticut), the Fine Arts Museum of Long Island (New York), the Wichita Art Museum (Kansas), and others. Weintraub was the recipient of a Silver Award in I.D. magazine's Interactive Media Review.

In 1995, she co-authored the College Art Association's Guidelines for Faculty Teaching in Computer-Based Media in Fine Art and Design.

== Selected publications ==
- "Life Support." Proceedings of SIGGRAPH '04. Association for Computing Machinery, 2004.
- "Design into Art.” Graphis, February/March 2003.
- "Pedestrian: Walking as Meditation and the Lure of Everyday Objects." Proceedings of SIGGRAPH '98. Association for Computing Machinery, 1998.
- "Art on the Web, the Web as Art." Communications of the ACM. October 1997.
- "No Escape from LA." fps: the Magazine of Computers and Animation, Winter 1997.
- "Web Space Is the Art Place." Intelligent Agent, October 1996.
- "Artifice, Artifact: The Landscape of the Constructed Digital Environment." Leonardo 28:5, November 1995.
