= Imani Jacqueline Brown =

American visual artist and activist

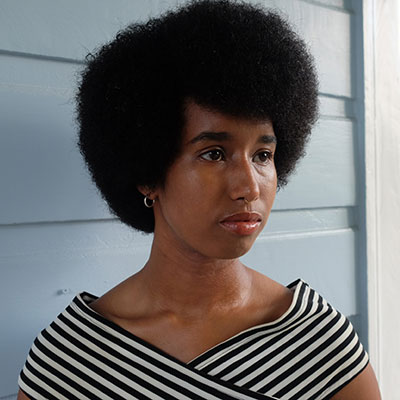
- Born: 1988 (age 37–38); New Orleans, LA
- Education: (2019) Received Master of Arts (with a focus in Research Architecture) at the Centre for Research Architecture at Goldsmiths at the University of London (2010) Received Bachelor of Arts in Anthropology and Visual Arts at Columbia University
- Website: imanijacquelinebrown.net

Imani Jacqueline Brown is a researcher and artist from New Orleans. She was a 2017 Whitney Biennial artist. In 2017, she was a U–jazdowski resident in Warsaw.

She uses her research to delve deeper into activism through her interest on the economic, social, and environmental wrongdoing of extractivism.

== Career ==
She graduated from Columbia University, and Goldsmiths, University of London. She is a member of Forensic Architecture.

Brown is involved in the following organizations/ institutions: Open Society Foundations, Fossil Free Fest (FFF), Forensic Architecture, Royal College of Art, and Occupy Museums.

=== Open Society Foundations - Researcher ===
She was a 2019 Open Society Foundations researcher. She continues to focus on her interests - which include fighting against the economic inequality created by the overuse of fossil fuels. She studies this inequity through mapping techniques she has learned as a student. Brown's thoughts on this inequality surround how it both enables and allows corporations to continue to benefit off of others, financially.

=== Fossil Free Fest - Founder, Artistic director ===
The Fossil Free Fest (FFF) is festival that provides a safe space to discuss how much of today's necessities are being funded through funds from those extracting fossil fuels. Brown believes "giving" has a strain on society since these corporations are taking from the environment; however, they are giving back to society. This way of "charity" is controversial and is exactly why Brown created the Fossil Free Fest (FFF). In 2019, Brown received the AFIELD fellowship for her work. Additionally, Brown directs this Fest as a part of Antenna.

=== Forensic Architecture - Economic Inequality Fellow ===
The Forensic Architecture studies and evaluates human rights issues around the world. As an Economic Inequality Fellow, some of her research examples of her research are police brutality, fossil fuel production, unfair corporation power. Through her research, Brown unveils the inequalities present throughout society. Her most recent work, Police Brutality at the Black Lives Matter Protests, explores the violence police have created at Black Lives Matter protests. She further pushes for the need for changes to make a difference in the inequalities present in society.

=== Royal College of Art - Environmental Architecture Program ===
Brown's department, Environmental Architecture at the Royal College of Art, centers much its focus on how environmental, life, and earth systems all connect with one another. Because of this, Brown continues her journey of understanding the continued benefit of corporations through the extrication of fossil fuels. As a visiting lecturer, Brown studies and discusses how extractivism displays the truth of American society. This "truth" is the continued capitalistic gain that is created through extracting natural resources. She notes her studies are through her "public action research."

=== Occupy Museums - Member ===
The Occupy Museums is an accumulation of artists who are a part of the Occupy Wall Street Movement. Brown has worked with other artists on Debtfair (a shared project). This project demonstrates the impact of finances on an artists' art.

== Past projects ==
In Brown's past, she was a part of Blights Out and Antenna.

=== Blights Out - Co-founder ===
Brown co-founded Blights Out. Blights Out is an accumulation of activists, architects, and artists who want change with housing development and displacement. These individuals want to show the reality and impact of gentrification. Eventually, Brown was able to be a part of projects within the organization. These projects included: 1731-2001, The Living Glossary, Blights Out for Mayor, and Blights Out for President.

=== Antenna - Director of Programs ===
Antenna is an organization that is actively assisting writers and artists in the New Orleans, LA area. This is how the organization intends on keeping the New Orleans city culture alive. As the Director of Programs, she eventually founded the Fuel Free Fest (FFF).

== Personal life ==
Brown has developed an interest in film photography.
