= Bittenbinder =

Bittenbinder, from bitten=cask + binder=binder, is a German occupational surname for a cooper. It may refer to the following notable people:

- J. J. Bittenbinder (1942–2023), American police officer and author
- József Bittenbinder (1890–1963), Hungarian gymnast

== See also ==
- Bittenbender
