= T. Kelly Mason =

American artist (born 1964)

T. Kelly Mason (born 1964) is a Los Angeles–based post-conceptual artist, writer, and educator who works in a number of media, including video, music, sculpture, and text. Mason has taught at ArtCenter College of Design in Pasadena since 2001.

== Education ==
Mason earned his Bachelor of Arts from California State University at Long Beach in 1988 where he studied music and liberal arts. In 1990 he earned his Masters of Fine Arts at ArtCenter College of Design. Mason studied with Stephen Prina and Mike Kelley.

== Style ==
Mason’s work takes on a number of forms and subjects, and research is a predominant component of his process. His research pairs both historical materials and ideas with the currency of field recordings, live sound and performance.

== Work ==
Mason’s early exhibitions such as High Points Drifter were influenced by Los Angeles and sought to reroute our relationship to its landmarks. Mason’s composition uses a subtle series of visual codes within the sculptures, paintings and recordings. Jody Zellen of Art Press describes Mason’s show at Mark Foxx as an excavation of the city, deconstructing his three large scale abstract drawings, “loaded with symbols that reference utopian ideas of social planning... class and race relations”. Christopher Miles at Artweek reads the show in juxtaposition with the Clint Eastwood movie which Mason derived his title, coming to the conclusion that Eastwood’s character paints the town red and blow it up to reveal what it was while Mason “(re) modeled the city to reveal it for what it isn’t”.

One of his first institutional shows was at “Pure Beauty”, an exhibition that had been the first in Frank Gehry’s new American Center in Paris. It was installed for the second time at MOCA in Los Angeles. It was one of Los Angeles’ earliest museum shows of artists under 30. The work consisted of a multi-channel video and sound installation taped during a residency at Claude Monet’s home in Giverny, France. The project examined the impressionistic landscape through photography, research and play within the gardens. Wilson criticized the work for being “presumably about the aggressive intrusions of the media preventing us from thinking… further deadening our poor brains”. Wilson finds “Pure Beauty” overall to be “noisy” and Mason’s piece the “loudest boom box” in the show.

In 1993 Mason was included in a group project called Tattoo Collection for the gallery Air de Paris, for which artists designed tattoos that needn’t be implemented upon a human body, raising the question whether it was the drawing or the executed tattoo that is the artwork.

Mason’s first Post-it Note collages were first shown in the Wohinkeinaugereicht in the Arbeitskreises für Photographie Hamburg in 1998. Mason’s Post-it notes float semi-casual text in juxtaposition with the image. In 2013 he published these interventions in the Bass Museums of Art’s member’s magazine using the Bass Archive and delivering philosophical commentary on the contents of the contents of the magazine.

A facet of Mason’s ongoing body of work consists of intricately cut layers of transparent colored gel affixed to custom designed light boxes depicting images of historical objects, places, artworks, and photographs, and in one such triptych, the painter Francis Bacon’s studio, that “reference animation cells, advertising, and painting all at once”.

== Personal life ==
Mason is married to video artist Diana Thater. Since completing the Graduate Art track at ArtCenter College of Design in 1990, Mason and Thater have collaborated on numerous projects, notably the 16mm film JUMP which was included in the 2006 Whitney Biennial and features twenty children jumping rope to live performances of Bob Dylan’s “Subterranean Homesick Blues”, for which Mason served as co-producer, music director and bass guitarist.
