= Charles Simonds (artist) =

American contemporary artist

- Born: 1945 (age 80–81); New York, New York
- Education: University of California, Berkeley (B.A.), Rutgers University (M.F.A.)
- Known for: Dwellings sculptures
- Style: Sculptor

Charles Simonds (born 1945) is an American contemporary artist and sculptor based in New York. He is best known for his sculptural series titled Dwellings, small clay constructions the artist has been installing in buildings across the world since the 1970s.

== Life and work ==
Charles Simonds was born in 1945 in New York City. In 1967, he received a Bachelor of Arts degree from the University of California, Berkeley and in 1969 he graduated with a Master of Fine Arts from Rutgers University in New Jersey. Critic Hilton Kramer, writing for The New York Times, claimed that Charles Simonds' "outlook has been shaped and stamped by the ethos of the counterculture that emerged in the late 60s".

=== Dwellings (1970s–now) ===
In 1970s, Simonds began installing small clay sculptures titled Dwellings around New York City. The sculptures have been described as "impermanent constructions in the crevices and vacant lots of New York neighborhoods" for the imaginary population of what the artist has termed "Little People". According to critic Kate Linker, these sculptures "have dealt with architectural principles, represented different types of dwellings and employed the psychological dimensions of shelter as a function of belief". According to art historian Ann Reynolds, "landscape, body, and dwelling" are the central themes of Simonds' practice.

In 1981, he was commissioned to install Dwellings at the Marcel Breuer-designed building of the Whitney Museum of American Art located at 945 Madison Avenue. Two other Dwellings have been installed at 940 Madison Avenue, across the street from Breuer building. The Whitney Dwellings sculpture has remained at the building under subsequent tenants, including the Met Breuer between 2016 and 2020 and, since 2021, the Frick Madison.

== Museum collections ==
His work has been included in institutional collections globally, including Albright-Knox Art Gallery, Buffalo, New York, Art Gallery of South Australia, Adelaide, Centro Cultural Arte Contemporaneo, Mexico City, Mexico, Israel Museum, Jerusalem, Kunsthaus Zurich, Switzerland, Musee National d'Art Moderne, Centre Georges Pompidou, Paris, France, Museum Ludwig, Cologne, Germany, Museum of Contemporary Art, Chicago, Illinois, and the Museum of Modern Art, New York, among others.
