= Jedd Garet =

American sculptor and painter

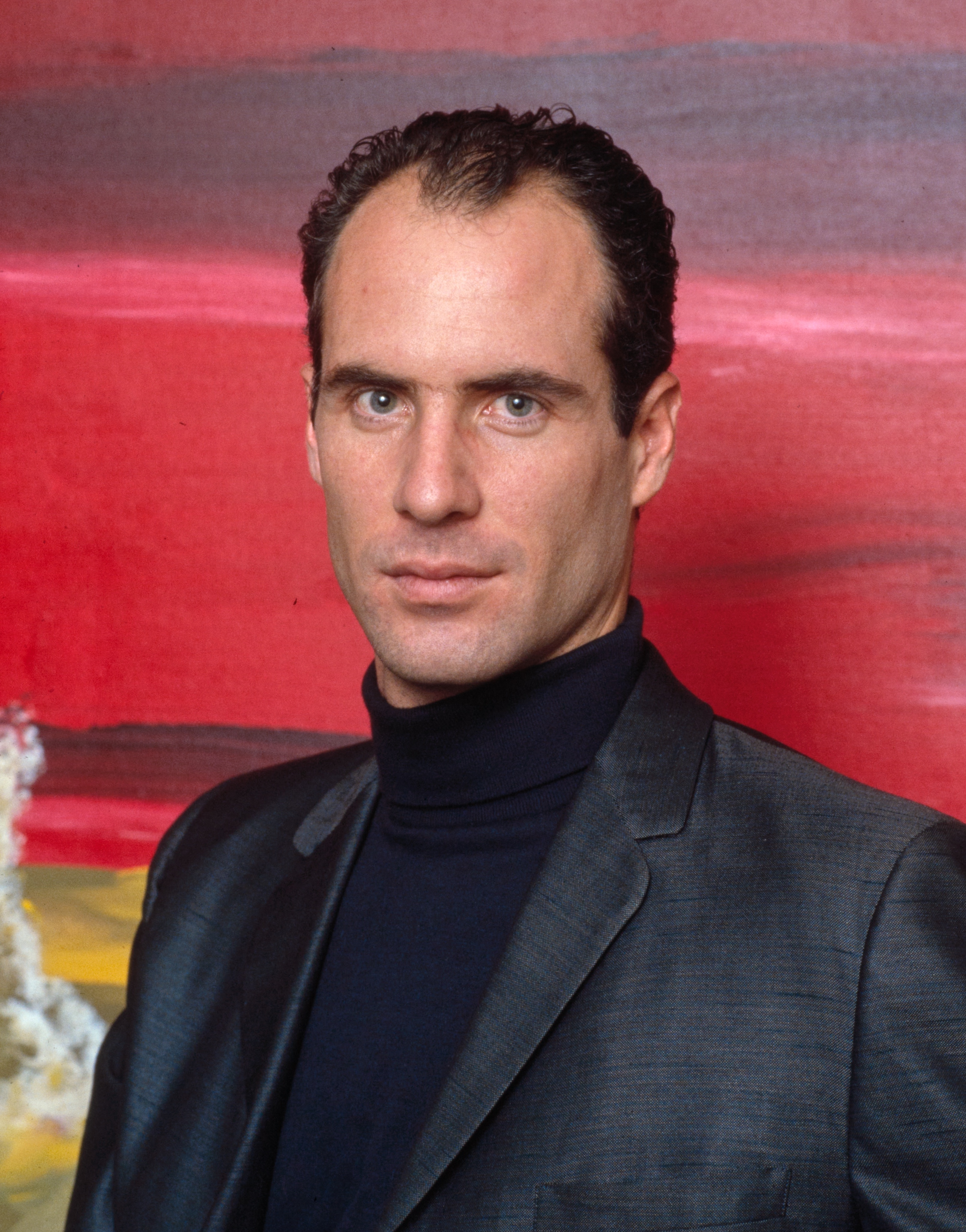
Garet in 1984

Nothing Too Strange and Beautiful, painted aluminum sculpture by Jedd Garet, 1985, Honolulu Museum of Art

Nice Sky lithograph by Jedd Garet, 1982

Jedd Garet is an American sculptor, painter and printmaker, who was born in 1955. He was raised in California, studied at the Rhode Island School of Design, and received a BFA from the School of Visual Arts in New York City.

Influenced by surrealist painter Giorgio de Chirico, Garet uses garish colors in jarring contrasts to explore relationships between nature, man, and art. He combines human figures, classical architectural fragments and abstraction in narrative works, and is known for his amorphous life forms. Nothing Too Strange and Beautiful, in the collection of the Honolulu Museum of Art demonstrates this phase of the artist's monumental sculpture. It was originally created as a folly for a sculpture park exhibition at Wave Hill in New York City. In later work, figures, trees and other more recognizable objects were added to the minimalist flat ground, creating tension.

The Fine Arts Museums of San Francisco, the Honolulu Museum of Art, The Museum of Modern Art (New York City), the Phoenix Art Museum (Phoenix, Arizona), the Portland Art Museum (Portland, Oregon), the Tate Gallery (London), and the Whitney Museum of American Art (New York City) are among the public collections holding works by Jedd Garet.
