= Les LeVeque =

Les LeVeque is an artist based in New York who works with digital and analog electronic technology. His work includes single and multi-channel videos and video/computer-based installations. LeVeque's work uses algorithmic structures, statistically distributed elements, experimentation with the boundaries of interfaces, and provides new views of existing narratives. In 2014 he is a member of the faculty and co-chair of Film and Video at the Milton Avery Graduate School of the Arts, Bard College.

== Early life and education ==
LeVeque holds an MFA from Syracuse University with a concentration in Video.

== Experiential video narratives ==
In 2014, Les LeVeque's creations are videos which combine and electronically modify appropriated media and filmed social situations to provoke physical, intellectual and emotional response from the viewers. LeVeque employs, in his work, algorithms and computer interface mixed with classical Hollywood films, appropriations of political broadcasts and advertisements, using new technology to provide an alternative view of cinema and to highlight political issues regarding media. The algorithms produce a visual experience that is not present in the original films.

== List of works ==
- Traders Leaving the Exchange, A Guard and the Street. 2011, 36 minutes, color, stereo, aspect ratio 4:3
- Workers Leaving the Factory – Ten Days that Shook The World. Downloaded, repeatedly recompressed and reversed. 2011, 24 minutes, color, stereo, aspect ratio 16:9
- Communists Like Us. 2010, 3:28 minutes, black and white, stereo, aspect ratio 4:3 Distributed by Video Data Bank
- as the waves play along with an invisible spine (the workers die). 2010, 10:40 minutes, black and white, stereo, aspect ratio 16:9 :Distributed by Video Data Bank
- white and fifteen movies starring Charlton Heston 2010, 15 minutes, color, stereo, aspect ratio 16:9

Distributed by Video Data Bank

- a little girl dreams of a new pluralism meanwhile the old war continues V.1. 2009, 67 minutes, black and white, stereo, aspect ratio 16:9
- a little girl dreams of a new pluralism meanwhile the old war continues V.2. 2009, 67 minutes, black and white, stereo, aspect ratio 16:9 Distributed by Video Data Bank
- stammering forward backward GIANT. 2008, 17:40 minutes, color, stereo, aspect ratio 16:9 Distributed by Video Data Bank
- Three Songs of Lenin (like we loved him). 2008, 10:49 minutes, black and white, stereo, aspect ratio 4:3 Distributed by Video Data Bank
- Unsung Musicals (Opening numbers) 2005–2008, silent, color A four channel video installation
- 16xohwhatabeautifulmornin. 37 minutes
- 16xthehillsarealivewiththesoundofmusic 71 minutes
- 32xtwolittlegirlsfromlittlerock. 42 minutes
- 32xnewyorknewyork. 150 minutes Represented by KS Art, New York
- Repeating The End. 2006, color, stereo A three-channel video and three mp3 player installation
- Beginning. 80 minutes
- Middle. 80 minutes
- End. 80 minutes Represented by KS Art, New York
- Memorial Stadium Slow Death (The full torture of death speed)x16. 2005, 5 minutes, color, stereo,

Distributed as part of the Electronic Re-mix Project

- Dramatically Repeating Lawrence of Arabia. 2004, 14:43 minutes, color, stereo Distributed by Video Data Bank
- AutoCraving 15. 2004, 7:30 minutes, color, stereo
- Doubling Forbidden Planet. 2003, 99 minutes, color, stereo, Represented by KS Art, New York
- Notes From The Underground. 2003, 4:44 minutes, color, stereo Distributed by Video Data Bank
- Strained Andromeda Strain. 2002, 6:55 minutes, color, stereo Distributed by Video Data Bank
- Pulse pharma phantasm 2002, 6:16 minutes, color, stereo Distributed by Video Data Bank
- Astronauts Trip. A single channel video installation 2002, 7:00 minutes, color, stereo
- Mister Speaker. Perry Bard and Les LeVeque 2002, 3:00 minutes, audio project
- Stutter the Searchers. 2001, 12:15 minutes, color, stereo Distributed by Video Data Bank
- Red Green Blue Gone with the Wind. 2001, 11:45 minutes, color, stereo Distributed by Video Data Bank
- Backwards Birth of a Nation. 2000, 13 minutes, black and white, stereo Distributed by Video Data Bank
- 4 Vertigo 2000, 9 minutes, color, stereo Distributed by Video Data Bank
- 4 Vertigo (a 4 channel video installation)
- 4 Vertigo (a web project)
- 2 Spellbound. 1999, 7:30 minutes, black and white, stereo Distributed by Video Data Bank
- A Song From The Cultural Revolution. 1998, 5 minutes, color, stereo Distributed by Video Data Bank
- flight. 1998, 7 minutes, color, stereo Distributed by Video Data Bank
- flight (a four-channel video installation)
- Encoded Facial Gestures, #1, #2, #3, #4. 1997, 7:30 minutes, color, stereo Distributed by Video Data Bank
- Dissing D.A.R.E: education as spectacle. Les LeVeque and Diane Nerwen 1997, 6 minutes, color, stereo Distributed by Video Data Bank
- Is It Love (#2). A six-channel video installation. 1997, black and white, silent
- Thorazine Rebel. Daniella Dooling and Les LeVeque 1997, 8:22, color, stereo
- Quartet. A 4-channel inter-active sound installation 1997
- Is It Love. An inter-active multi-channel video installation

1996

- You Kept Our Rendezvous. A ten-channel inter-active sound installation 1996
- the free space of the commodity. 1995, 2:52 minutes, color, stereo Distributed by Video Data Bank
- KEPT. Les LeVeque and Diane Nerwen 1995, 1:52 minutes, black and white, color, stereo
- GASP. Les LeVeque and Diane Nerwen 1993, 13 minutes, color, stereo
- PREEXISTING CONDITIONS. Les LeVeque and Diane Nerwen. 1992, 9:30 minutes, color, stereo Distributed by V Tape
- Untitled. A multi-channel kinetic video installation. 1992
- Noisy Insignificance. John Knecht and Les LeVeque A ten-channel video installation
- More Questions Concerning Technology. A multi-channel kinetic video installation. 1991
- THE WARDEN THREW A PARTY. Diane Nerwen and Les LeVeque 1991, 6:42 minutes, color, stereo Distributed by V Tape
- LIGHT SWEET CRUDE. Les LeVeque and Diane Nerwen 1991, 11:34 minutes, color, stereo Distributed by V Tape
- Some Questions Concerning Technology. A multi-channel kinetic video installation 1990
- GENERAL EDUCATION Lesson 1: Partnerships. 1990, 2:34 minutes, color, stereo
- FREDDIE BRICE PAINTS TWO PAINTINGS. Les LeVeque and Kerry Schuss 1990, 22:30 minutes, color, stereo, 22:30 ::Represented by KS Art, New York
