= Peter Cain (artist) =

American painter

Peter Cain, Pathfinder, 1992, oil on linen, 92 x 93 inches

Peter Cain (1959 in Orange, New Jersey – January 5, 1997 in New York, New York) was an artist who is best known for his meticulously executed paintings and drawings of surreal and aberrant versions of automobiles. His style has been said to combine aspects of Surrealism, Photorealism, and the art of James Rosenquist. He is of the same generation of painters who came to prominence in the 1990s such as Elizabeth Peyton, John Currin, Peter Doig, and Karen Kilimnik. He died at age thirty seven of a cerebral hemorrhage having completed sixty-three paintings over the course of his short career. He was represented by the Matthew Marks Gallery in New York during his lifetime.

== Work ==
Peter Cain, Mobil, 1996, oil on linen, 37 x 57 inches

Cain studied at New York's Parsons School of Design from 1977 to 1980 and the School of Visual Arts from 1980 to 1982. His early paintings derived their subjects from advertisements for rare and vintage automobiles, 1960s "muscle cars," high end sports coupes, and luxury sedans. He often began by collaging the source material to produce a distorted, abbreviated version of the car's original form. He then used these collages as studies for his paintings. In Pathfinder, included in the 1993 Whitney Biennial (1992–93, oil on linen), Cain merged the front fender and headlights of a black SUV with the rear third of the vehicle. The car's hood, front doors and cab have completely disappeared, and the Pathfinder was then tipped up on its trunk against a solid white ground. Writing on a similar painting, critic Jerry Saltz said that the car paintings “cleverly question the nature of intelligence by presenting the image of a ‘thing’ that is knowable and unclassifiable in a painting that is like a filmstrip of a painting all collapsed and run together in to a single dense frame.”

In 1996, Cain turned his attention from cars to Los Angeles gas stations and convenience stores a year before his death. These landscapes are void of any human presence; Cain even erased logos and type from the numerous signs which inhabit such places. Foliage is rendered in micro-faceted masses of green paint. When the Los Angeles paintings had their posthumous premier at the Matthew Marks Gallery in 1997, Peter Schjeldahl wrote, “I had trouble with Cain’s car pictures while being enchanted by the promise of his painterly gifts and ambition. Now we see the beginning of the promise’s fulfillment in the same instant as its end: an exceptional talent nipped in mid-blossoming, just short of full bloom. ”

== Exhibitions ==
Peter Cain was included both the 1993 and 1995 Whitney Biennial, as well as the 2017 Whitney exhibition Fast Forward: Painting from the 1980s. His work has been the subject of several gallery exhibitions, including:

2026

- Peter Cain, The Los Angeles Photographs, American Art Catalogues, New York.

2005

- Peter Cain: The Sean Pictures, Matthew Marks Gallery, New York.
- The Los Angeles Pictures, Gelerie Aurel Scheibler, Cologne.

2002

- Peter Cain: More Courage and Less Oil, Matthew Marks Gallery, New York.

1997

- Peter Cain, Matthew Marks Gallery, New York.

1995

- Peter Cain, Paintings, Drawings, Photographs, Matthew Marks Gallery, New York.
- Daniel Weinberg Gallery, San Francisco

1991

- Peter Cain, Matthew Marks Gallery, New York.

1990

- Peter Cain, Paintings and Drawings, Daniel Weinberg Gallery, Santa Monica.

1989

- Peter Cain, Pat Hearn Gallery, New York

== Public collections ==
The work of Peter Cain is in both the collection of the Metropolitan Museum of Art, New York and the Whitney Museum of American Art, New York.

== Selected bibliography ==
=== Books on Peter Cain ===
- Dunham, Carroll and Bob Nickas. More Courage and Less Oil. New York: Matthew Marks Gallery, 2002.
- Pierson, Jack and Terry Myers. The Los Angeles Pictures. New York: Matthew Marks Gallery, 2006/Gallery Aurel Scheibler Köln, 2006.

=== Articles on Peter Cain ===
- Raczka, Tony. Demfamiliarizing an American Icon. Artweek, November 15, 1990.
- Saltz, Jerry. Wild Thing: Peter Cain's Untitled. Arts Magazine, March 1990, 13–14.
- Saltz, Jerry. Carpe Diem. The Village Voice, October 23–29, 2002, 67.
- Schjeldahl, Peter. Hail and Farewell. The Village Voice, February 25, 1997.
- Smith, Roberta. A New Surge of Growth Just as Death Cut It Off. New York Times, February 14, 1997.
