= Josh Brand =

American artist

Josh Brand (born 1980) is an artist who lives and works in New York.

== Background ==
Brand was born in Elkhorn, Wisconsin, US in 1980. He undertook his BFA at The School of The Art Institute of Chicago, graduating in 2002.

He undertook his BFA and MFA in Fine Art at The School of the Art Institute of Chicago between 1971-1978. Brand had a darkroom in his family basement, and as a teenager he would experiment for hours with the chemistry of photography, later working as a professional printer. His process-based photographic ‘objects’ are often made as the result of a physically manipulated, completely camera-less procedure.

== Exhibitions ==
Brand's work has been exhibited at the Whitney Biennial, White Columns, New York, Dallas Museum of Art, the Museum of Contemporary Photography, Chicago, the CEAAC (European Center for Contemporary Art Actions), Strasbourg, the Emily Harvey Foundation, New York, Leubsdorf Gallery at Hunter College, New York and Drawing Room, London. His work is included in the public collections of the Museum of Fine Arts, Houston, and the Dallas Museum of Art, US.
