= Robert Greene (artist) =

American contemporary artist

- Born: 1953 (age 72–73); New York City
- Education: Syracuse University
- Known for: Contemporary art, arcadian landscapes

Robert Greene (born 1953) is an American contemporary artist known for his early Arcadian landscapes and later shift towards abstract, textured monochromatic patterns. His work, characterized by a distinctive style that blurs the boundaries between these two mediums, has been showcased in Museum of American Art, Whitney Museum of American Art, Metropolitan Museum of Art, and others.

== Early life and education ==
Greene was born in New York City. He pursued his higher education at Syracuse University's College of Visual and Performing Arts from 1971 to 1973, and later attended Pratt Institute in Brooklyn, New York, where he obtained his Bachelor of Industrial Design (BID) in 1976.

== Career ==
Greene was represented by the Robert Miller Gallery for 30 years. He gained early recognition with his inclusion in the 1987 Whitney Biennial, following his debut solo exhibition in 1985. His figurative landscapes, often described as “imagined fantasies” and “disconnected narratives” (Jerry Saltz, 1990), drew frequent comparisons to Antoine Watteau and Florine Stettheimer. Critics noted his blend of poetic sophistication and pastoral themes, with Gerrit Henry (Art in America, 1986) citing his “delectable, discreet balance” of urban reality and lyrical imagery. Greene's works are included in several public collections, such as the Metropolitan Museum of Art and the Whitney Museum of American Art.

His work is held in major collections including the Metropolitan Museum of Art and the Whitney Museum of American Art. Greene had a solo show at the Stedelijk Bureau in Amsterdam in 1996 and was featured twice in The Paris Review, including the cover of issue 133 (1994).

In 2001, Greene shifted from figurative to abstract painting, emphasizing color and texture. Critics such as Roberta Smith praised this phase, calling him “an abstractionist of some rigor.” His abstract work drew the attention of architect Peter Marino, who commissioned Greene for over 50 Chanel Boutique installations worldwide, including a major 2024 piece for Galeries Lafayette in Paris.

== Selected solo exhibitions ==
- 2019: Mitchell Algus Gallery, New York
- 2011: Robert Miller Gallery, New York, NY
- 2008: Art Link Gallery, Seoul, South Korea
- 2007: Robert Miller Gallery, New York, NY
- 2003: Patricia Faure Gallery, Santa Monica, CA
- 1999: Richard Telles Fine Art, Los Angeles, CA
- 1998: Robert Miller Gallery, New York, NY
- 1996: Stedelijk Museum, Amsterdam, Netherlands
- 1992: Robert Miller Gallery, New York, NY
- 1991: Galeria Leyendecker, Santa Cruz de Tenerife, Spain
- 1989: Robert Miller Gallery, New York, NY
- 1988: Robert Miller Gallery, New York, NY
- 1987: Betsy Rosenfield Gallery, Chicago, IL
- 1986-87: Meredith Long & Company, Houston, TX
- 1986: Robert Miller Gallery, New York, NY
- 1984: Tracey Garet Gallery, New York, NY
- 1983: Kathleen Meyer Gallery, Louisville, KY

== Selected group exhibitions ==
- 2020: Mitchell Algus Gallery, New York
- 2013: Suddenness + Certainty, Robert Miller Gallery, New York, NY
- 2010: Summer Exhibition, Robert Miller Gallery, New York, NY
- 2007: Gallery 1: Miriam Back, Helen Bradley, Robert Greene, Florine Stettheimer, Andrea Rosen Gallery, New York, NY
- 2006: Black and Blue, Robert Miller Gallery, New York, NY
- 2005-06: Zoo Story: An Exhibition of Animals in Art – For the Young and the Young at Heart, Fisher Landau Center, Queens, NY
- 2004: Ground – Field – Surface, Robert Miller Gallery, New York, NY
- 1999: Painting Fore and Aft, A.C.M.E., Los Angeles, CA
- 1998: A Figurative Dialogue: Summer 1998, Andrew F Sie Contemporary Art, Altamonte Springs, FL
- 1997-98: Woodwork, Fisher Landau Center, New York, NY
- 1995: Revisiting Landscape, California Center for the Arts Museum, Escondido, CA
- 1993: Artists' Photographs: A Private View, Blum Helman Gallery, Inc., New York, NY
- 1991-92: American Artists of the Eighties, Palazzo delle Albere, Museo Provinciale d'Arte Sezione Contemporanea, Trento, Italy
- 1991: The 1980s: Selections from the Permanent Collection, Whitney Museum of American Art, New York, NY
- 1989-90: Festivities, Beth Urdang Fine Art, Boston, MA
- 1988-89: Travelling, Althea Viafora Gallery, New York, NY
- 1987: Whitney Biennial, Whitney Museum of American Art, New York, NY
- 1987: Landscape: A Point of View, G.H. Dalsheimer Gallery LTD., Baltimore, MD
- 1986: 13 Americans, CDS Gallery, New York, NY
- 1984: B-Side Gallery, New York, NY

== Selected publications ==
- 2021 The architecture of Chanel Peter Marino Phaidon Press p84-97
- 2016 Peter Marino Art Architecture, Phaidon Press 2016 p. 8-13, p. 196-197
- 2007 Robert Greene (exhibition catalogue), essay by David Rimanelli, New York: Robert Miller Gallery.
- 2006 Marrero, Kimberly. “Among the Trees.” Among the Trees (exhibition pamphlet). Summit, NJ: Visual
  - Arts Center of New Jersey, pp. 3, 10, illus. [Quiet Tree, 1989, reproduced, P. 3.]
  - Rimanelli, David. Robert Greene (exhibition catalogue). New York: Robert Miller Gallery.
- 1995 Shaw, Reesey. Revisiting Landscape. Escondido, CA: California Center for the Arts Museum.

== Recognition and style ==
Greene describes his process as a blend of methodical and intuitive techniques, where his oil paintings celebrate color and texture through a meticulous cycle of construction, deconstruction, and repositioning. His approach aims to harmonize individual mark-making with systematic precision, reflecting his view of beauty's infinite nature.

In 2001, Robert Greene's 1988 painting We Set Off In High Spirits was featured in a group exhibition of the same name at Matthew Marks Gallery in New York, curated by Inez van Lamsweerde and Vinoodh Matadin. The curators described Greene's work as "the spirit of the show," highlighting its use of scale and setting as key influences on their own artistic vision.

== Selected press ==
- Smith, Roberta. “Art in Review: Ground-Field-Surface.” The New York Times, August 13, 2004, p. E30.
- Smith, Roberta. “Robert Greene.” The New York Times, March 20, 1998.
- Vogel, Carol. “‘Captive’ Works Are Being Freed.” The New York Times, March 20, 1998.
- Cotter, Holland. “We Set Off in High Spirits.” The New York Times, August 3, 2001.
- Perl, Jed. “Making Faces.” Vogue, March 1993, pp. 217–224.
- Saltz, Jerry. “Let Us Now Praise Artist’s Artists.” Art & Auction, April 1993, pp. 74–79, 115.
- Hainley, Bruce. “Best of 2001.” Artforum, vol. 40, no. 4, December 2001, pp. 104–105.
- Rimanelli, David. “Best of 2001.” Artforum, vol. 40, no. 4, December 2001, pp. 110–111.
- Liebmann, Lisa. “Robert Greene/Robert Miller Gallery.” Artforum, November 1992, p. 105.
- Hirsch, Faye. “Robert Greene at Robert Miller.” Art in America, December 1992, p. 114.
- Kertess, Klaus. “Robert Greene.” BOMB, Spring 1989, no. XXVIII, pp. 30–33.
- Hainley, Bruce. “Robert Greene: Robert Miller.” Artforum, Summer 1998, p. 132. [Plunge, 1998, illus.]
- Smith, P.C. “Robert Greene at Robert Miller.” Art in America, December 1988, pp. 155–156.
- Indiana, Gary. “Another Review of the Whitney.” The Village Voice, April 28, 1987, pp. 87–88.
- Henry, Gerrit. “Robert Greene at Robert Miller.” Art in America, May 1986, p. 161.
