= Nic Nicosia =

American photographer and sculptor (born 1951)

Nic Nicosia (born 1951) is an American artist using photography, sculpture, and drawing in his practice.

== Early life and education ==
Nicosia was born in Dallas, Texas.

He received a bachelor of science degree in radio-television-film, with a concentration in motion pictures, from the University of North Texas in 1974.

== Career ==
Real Pictures #11, gelatin silver print by Nic Nicosia, 1988, Honolulu Museum of Art

Nicosia is considered a pioneer in the staged photographic movement that came into prominence in the early 1980s. Real Pictures #11 is an example of his staged pictures. It was taken shortly after moving into a new suburban Dallas neighborhood, and uses three children who lived on his street as models.

=== Award ===
He was awarded a Louis Comfort Tiffany Foundation grant in 1984 and a Guggenheim Fellowship in 2010.

=== Public collections ===
Nicosia's work is held in public collections, including the Dallas Museum of Art, the High Museum of Art (Atlanta), the Honolulu Museum of Art, the Nasher Sculpture Center, the Los Angeles County Museum of Art, the Museum of Contemporary Art, Chicago, the Museum of Fine Arts, Houston, the Museum of Modern Art (New York City), the San Francisco Museum of Modern Art, the Solomon R. Guggenheim Museum (New York City), the Walker Art Center (Minneapolis), and the Whitney Museum of American Art (New York City).

== Personal life ==
Nicosia lives in Dallas, after having previously lived in Santa Fe, New Mexico, between 2004 and 2015.
