= Barbara Schwartz (artist) =

American painter

- Born: August 23, 1948; Philadelphia
- Died: May 8, 2006; New York City
- Known for: Sculpture, painting
- Movement: Abstract art

Cut Diamond #7 (2004–05) by Barbara Schwartz

Barbara Schwartz (1948 – May 8, 2006 in New York City) was an American abstract artist, painter, sculptor and art teacher.

== Life ==
Schwartz was born in Philadelphia. She studied at Carnegie Mellon University for her BFA. She moved to New York and had her first solo show in 1975 at the Willard Gallery. Towards the end of the 1970s, she aimed to develop abstract painting, including non-Western decorative elements, such as an Islamic influence, as well as integrating geometric with organic forms. Her painted plaster reliefs were associated with the Pattern and Decoration movement in New York. From 1978, she taught at the School of Visual Arts. She was Keith Haring's teacher. In 1979, she was represented in the Whitney Biennial. She experimented with numerous materials, including wood, glass, and metal, and often cast pieces in bronze and aluminum. She used glazed ceramic for her work in the 1990s. Her last representing gallery was the Andre Zarre Gallery in New York, where she had a show shortly before her death.

Her work is in the collections of New Mexico Museum of Art, Utah Museum of Fine Arts, Albright-Knox Art Gallery, New York, Neuberger Museum, New York, the New York Public Library, the Museum of Contemporary Art, Chicago, Cincinnati Museum of Fine Arts, Pennsylvania Academy of Fine Arts and Solomon R. Guggenheim Museum.

Schwartz married, and was divorced from, artists Bill Jensen and Art Schade. She died age 58 from leukemia which developed from chemotherapy she had twelve years previously for ovarian cancer, said her companion, Richard Johnson; she was also survived by her stepdaughter, Megan Schade.
