= Angela Strassheim =

American photographer

Angela Strassheim (born 1969) is an American photographer living and working in Brooklyn, New York and Jerusalem. Prior to receiving her MFA from Yale in 2003, Strassheim worked as a certified forensic photographer. In this capacity she produced crime scene, evidence, and surveillance photography in Miami. Later, having moved to New York, she began to photograph autopsies as well.

== Early life and education ==
A native of Bloomfield, Iowa, Strassheim was born into a family of fundamentalist born-again Christians and later during her childhood, lived in Minnetonka, Minnesota. A 1995 graduate of the Minneapolis College of Art and Design, from which she received her BFA, she possesses a Forensic & Biomedical Photography Certification from the Metro-Dade County Forensic Imaging Bureau in Miami, and received an MFA from Yale University. She has taught at the Minneapolis College of Art and Design.

== Work ==
Strassheim's style has been described as "CSI meets Billy Graham", and blends references to religion and art history with elements recalling her Midwestern upbringing. Museums and institutions with examples of her work include the Art Institute of Chicago, the Aperture Foundation, the Israel Museum, the Minneapolis Center for Photography, Yale University, the Monterey Museum of Art, the Minnesota Museum of American Art, the Museum of Contemporary Art, Los Angeles, and the National Museum of Women in the Arts. Her work has also appeared in the Whitney Biennial.

== Awards ==
Strassheim has received a number of awards during her career; these include a Women in Photography Lightside Individual Project Grant, a Bush Foundation Artist Fellowship, a Photography Fellowship from the McKnight Foundation, a Jerome Foundation Fellowship, and an Artist Initiative Grant from the Minnesota State Arts Board.
