= Andrew Noren =

- Born: 1943; Santa Fe, New Mexico
- Died: May 2, 2015 (aged 71); South Carolina
- Years active: 1965–2004

Andrew Noren (1943–May 2, 2015) was an American avant-garde filmmaker.

== Biography ==
Andrew Noren was born 1943 in Santa Fe, New Mexico and grew up in Southern California. He served in the Army before briefly attending university.

Noren moved to New York in the mid 1960s, where he worked as an editor at ABC. Through his job, he was able to access a Bolex 16 mm camera, with which he began making films. His first work, A Change of Heart, was a narrative feature film inspired by Jean-Luc Godard's Breathless. After the film's premiere, Noren met Jonas Mekas through a co-worker. He started working at the Film-Makers' Cooperative, where he became connected to local avant-garde filmmakers.

Noren began making more experimental works toying with different documentary approaches. For Say Nothing, he recorded a single 30-minute shot in which he administers a screen test. Inspired by the Lumière brothers, his film The New York Miseries was a collection of three-minute takes documenting his own life. Its production was interrupted in 1967, when a film laboratory confiscated the footage and submitted it to police because it included images of Noren and his girlfriend having sex. He was able to successfully challenge the decision in court. The New York Miseries, along with several other works from Noren's early period, were accidentally destroyed in 1970 and are now lost films.

Noren's next film Huge Pupils was the first entry in The Adventures of the Exquisite Corpse, an ongoing film cycle continued growing for the rest of his career. The cycle came to include nine films: Huge Pupils, False Pretenses, The Phantom Enthusiast, Charmed Particles, The Lighted Field, Imaginary Light, Time Being, Free to Go (Interlude), and Aberration of Starlight. The Lighted Field, a silent, improvised and plotless parable/thesis featuring black and white newsreel footage from where the filmmaker worked, was selected for preservation in the National Film Registry in 2023 for its cultural and historical importance.

In 1972 Noren began working at the Sherman Grinberg Film Library as a researcher and licensing agent for archived stock footage and newsreels. After Sherman Grinberg went out of business in 1998, Noren founded the Research Source, a visual research and copyright clearance company.

Noren died of lung cancer in 2015.

== Filmography ==
- A Change of Heart (1965)
- Say Nothing (1965)
- The New York Miseries (1966)
- Bathing (1967)
- The Wind Variations (1968)
- Huge Pupils (1968)
- False Pretenses (1974)
- The Phantom Enthusiast (1975)
- Charmed Particles (1978)
- The Lighted Field (1987)
- Imaginary Light (1994)
- Time Being (2001)
- Free to Go (Interlude) (2003)
- Aberration of Starlight (2008)
