= Ernesto Caivano =

Ernesto Caivano (born 1972 in Madrid, Spain) is a New York-based artist with a primary focus in drawing. Caivano has been exhibited at New York's MoMa PS1 and London's White Cube.

== Education ==
Ernest Cavaino studied Fine Arts in New York City, where he earned a BFA in 1999 at Cooper Union, and an MFA in 2001 at Columbia University.

== Work ==
Caivano is known for his highly detailed and intricate, story-like ink drawings, dealing with themes of folklore, love, and technology. His drawings are typically free of color and focus on fastidious line work, which express influence from the etchings of Albrecht Dürer.

In 2004, Ernesto had a major solo-exhibition at MoMa PS1 titled, After the Woods. The exhibition showcased large scale drawings from Caivano's on-going narrative in which a man, portrayed as a knight, reconvenes with his wife, who became a space vessel, after being segregated for a thousand years.

Along with After the Woods at MoMa PS1, Ernesto Caivano has exhibited work at museums and galleries internationally, such as the Louisiana Museum of Modern Art in Denmark, the Museum of Modern Art in New York, the Royal Academy of the Arts in London, and the Whitney Biennial in New York.

== Honors and awards ==
- Joan Sovern Award, Columbia University, NY, 2001
- Hayward Prize of the American Austrian Foundation, Austria, 2001, 2002
- Salzburg Kunstakademie Fellowship, Austria, 2002

== Collections ==
- Los Angeles County Museum of Art
- Museum of Contemporary Art, Los Angeles
- Museum of Modern Art
- New York Public Library
- Solomon R. Guggenheim Museum
- Whitney Museum of American Art
