= Vincent Fecteau =

American artist

- Born: 1969 (age 56–57)
- Known for: Sculpture
- Awards: MacArthur Fellow, Guggenheim Fellow

Vincent Fecteau (born 1969) is an American sculptor based in San Francisco. He graduated from Wesleyan University in 1992.

He is known for working with ordinary materials such as foamcore, seashells, string, rubber bands, paper clips, walnut shells, and popsicle sticks, and transforming them into beautifully precise handcrafted sculptures. Constructed of papier-mâché, Fecteau often works on several sculptures at a time, taking a year or longer to finish each work. He layers materials and textures, revealing a painstaking creative process that alters significantly the original spherical shapes.

Fecteau's art has been included in numerous exhibitions, including the 2002 and 2012 Whitney Biennial, the 2013 Carnegie International, and a 2008 solo exhibition at the Art Institute of Chicago, Focus: Vincent Fecteau, New Work. In 2005, the Guggenheim Foundation announced Vincent Fecteau as recipient of their fellowship. A MacAuthur Foundation fellowship (commonly known as a "genius grant") followed in 2016. His work is held in the collections of the Museum of Modern Art and the San Francisco Museum of Modern Art.

Vincent Fecteau is represented by Matthew Marks and Galerie Buchholz.
