= Michael E. Smith (artist) =

American artist

- Born: 1977 (age 48–49); Detroit, Michigan, U.S.
- Occupation: Artist

Michael E. Smith (born 1977) is an American artist whose minimal sculptures often juxtapose appropriated, discarded everyday items found in urban decay and on eBay. His works have been shown in MoMA PS1, SculptureCenter, the Eli and Edythe Broad Art Museum and the 2019 Venice Biennale.

Michael E. Smith is represented by Andrew Kreps, New York, KOW, Berlin, Modern Art, London. and Galleria ZERO..., Milan.

== Selected exhibitions ==
Solo

- 2018: Atlantis, Marseille
- 2018: David Ireland House, San Francisco
- 2017:Stedelijk Museum voor Actuele Kunst, Ghent
- 2016: pig, Capri, Düsseldorf

Group

- 2022: Whitney Biennial
- 2019: Venice Biennale
- 2017: "All Watched Over by Machines of Loving Grace", Palais de Tokyo
