= Robert Lawrance Lobe =

American sculptor

Harmony Ridge #29, by Robert Lawrance Lobe, 1990, anodized aluminum, Honolulu Museum of Art

Robert Lawrance Lobe (born 1945) is an American sculptor. He was born in Detroit and grew up in Cleveland. He received a B.A. from Oberlin College in 1967 and then pursued post-graduate work at Hunter College.

Harmony Ridge #29, in the collection of the Honolulu Museum of Art, is typical of the depictions of rocks and trees in heat-treated, hammered aluminum for which he is best known. He employs an adaptation of repoussé and chasing, in which he encases trees and rocks in sheets of aluminum. Employing hand-held and pneumatic hammers, he beats the aluminum until it assumes the shape of the wood or rock.

The Albright–Knox Art Gallery (Buffalo, New York), Allen Memorial Art Museum (Oberlin, Ohio). the Brooklyn Museum, Castellani Art Museum (Niagara Falls, New York). the Cleveland Museum of Art, the Detroit Institute of Arts, the DeCordova Museum and Sculpture Park (Lincoln, Massachusetts), the Honolulu Museum of Art, the Indianapolis Museum of Art, (Mihama-cho, Japan), the Milwaukee Art Museum, the Museum of Contemporary Art, Los Angeles, the Museum of Fine Arts, Houston, the National Gallery of Art (Washington, D.C.), the Newark Museum (Newark, New Jersey), the Solomon R. Guggenheim Museum (New York), and the Menil Collection (Houston, Texas) are among the public collections holding works by Robert Lobe.
