= Lois Lane (artist) =

American artist

Lois Lane (born 6 January 1948) is an American painter born in Philadelphia. Her work is included in the collections of the Whitney Museum of American Art the Pérez Art Museum Miami, and the Museum of Modern Art, New York. Lane resides in New York City.

Lane's work is characterised by complex imagery influenced by minimalism, and rendered akin to collage.
