= Janine Gordon =

American rapper and photographer (born 1972/73)

Jah Jah
- Also known as: MC Jah Jah
- Born: Janine Gordon; 1972 or 1973 (age 53–54)
- Origin: Brooklyn, New York, U.S.
- Genres: rap, hardcore rap, East Coast rap, hip hop
- Occupations: rapper, photographer, artist
- Website: thing.net/~janine

Janine Gordon (born 1972 or 1973), better known by her professional name Jah Jah or MC Jah Jah, is an American rapper, photographer, and multimedia artist.

== Rap career ==
Jah Jah is an independent artist who is currently working without a major label. Her first record deal was with E-magine music entitled "The Art of Hip Hop", produced with Chubb Rock in 2002. Since 2005 she has been working almost exclusively with Quickmix who produced "The Attack","Lawless" and "Intelligence Report". In 2002 she was on an episode of Texas Justice as a plaintiff against producers who did not produce industry standard quality music. She gave a live rap performance to the judge on this daytime television show and won. In 2003 she went to São Paulo Brazil for over a year and worked with a group of rapper and reggae artists including Jimmy Luv and Grand Master Duda, producing two albums. Jah Jah performed extensively at various clubs in Brazil and a television appearances on The Syange Show. Jah Jah appeared on the first episode of ego trip's The (White) Rapper Show, but according to her they did not select her because she was overqualified and outshone the other contestants. Jah Jah got her start in rap by freestyling with other artists, known and underground hip hop scene during the '90s. It was here that she met many other artists such as Redman, Chubb Rock, and The Beatnuts. "I was encouraged meeting Redman and The Beatnuts. Redman called me out in his song back in 97'" stated the rapper in an interview. She has a very wide fan base on Myspace and has experienced some success with her music overseas in Brazil. Jah Jah was able to remain within the top 10 artists for over a year on the Myspace music chart.

=== Lawsuit against 50 Cent ===
In 2005, Jah Jah filed a copyright infringement lawsuit against 50 Cent and Dr. Dre for allegedly stealing her music and using it illegally for 50's Massacre album.

=== Discography ===
- The Art of Hip Hop (2002)
- Take a Lick Take a Bite (2005)
- The Attack (2007)
- Musica Do Brasil (2008)
- Intelligence Report (2010)
- Lawless (2010)

== Art work ==
Jah Jah has art, notably photography, that has appeared in magazines such as Arena and galleries in New York City, San Francisco, Brazil, and Europe. Her visual art work is credited under her real name, Janine Gordon. She also has a master's degree in fine art from New York University.

=== Exhibitions ===
Here are the exhibitions that Janine's art has been featured in:

==== Solo exhibitions ====
- 2008 MV Art Projects, Zurich
- 2007/08 Elga Wimmer Gallery, New York
- 2006 Les Rencontres d'Arles festival, France: laureate of the Discovery Award
- 2006 Galerie Kamel Mennour, Paris
- 2005 Galerie Volker Diehl, Berlin, Germany
- 2005 Galerie Kamel Mennour, Paris
- 2004 Oliver Kamm Gallery, New York
- 2002 Deitch Projects, New York Galerie Volker Diehl, Berlin XL Xavier LaBoulbenne, New York
- 2001 Refusalon Gallery, San Francisco
- 1998/99 ANP, Antwerpen
- 1996 John Gibson Gallery, New York
- 1995 White Columns, New York In Vitroî, Art Contemporain, Geneva, curated by Lionel Bovier

==== Group exhibitions ====
- 2008 Art for Life, benefit with Rush Arts at Russell Simmons CNEAI, France, curated by John Armleder and Mai-Thu Perret No Milk Today, Autoversion Ltd. New York City The Other Side, The 58 Gallery, NJ, curated by Billy Miller Artist as Publisher, The Center for Book Arts___ In A Boxî, Canco, Jersey City, Curated by B. Miller Circulo Azul, Mexico curated by Elga Wimmer El Aire, Mexico, curated by Elga Wimmer Diva Art Fair, Elga Wimmer Black Noise, project with John Armleder, MAMCO, Switzerland Invisible Museum, Devon Dikeu via Denver Art Museum Do the Right Bling, Stedelijk Museum, Holland Youth of Today, Shirinkunstalle, Germany Moscow Art Fair, Moscow, Galerie Volker Diehl MACO, Mexico Art fair, Elga Wimmer Extension 17. The Swiss Institute, NYC, Paris Photo 2005, Galerie Volker Diehl Summer group show, Mitchell ñIness and Nash
- 2004 Will Boys Will Be Boys, curated by Shamim Momim The Armory, NY, Galerie Volker Diehl Palais de Tokyo ((((LIVE)))), Curated by Jerome Sans Rimbaud, I-20 Gallery, curated by Max Henry Teenage Kicks, Royal Hiberian Academy. Dublin, Ireland Affordable art fair, Oliver Kamm/5BE, NADA Art Fair Miami, Mitchell-Innes and Nash Gallery- Art Basel Miami Beach, booth; The Drawing Center Benefit selections A Moments Notice, Inman Gallery, Texas Robert York Gallery, NYC
- 2002 Highlights from the Permanent Photography Collection The Armory, Paul Morris Gallery The Bathroom show, Daniel Riech, NY BOMB, curated Brooklyn Front Gallery, Brooklyn Come to Life, curated by Noritoshi Hirakawa Hot Groove, Gallery M, NY Ottokringer Brewrei, Vienna
- 2001 Whitney Biennial, 2001, The Whitney Museum of American Art Pollock to Today: Highlights from the Permanent Collection Whitney Museum of American Art, New York Directory, Swiss Institute New York, curated by Marc-Olivier Wahler Masculinities Nikolaj Contemporary Art Center of Copenhagen, "Guide to trust No.2", Yerba Buena Center for the arts, curated by Jimi Dams "Peppermint", Smack Melon, Brooklyn, NY, curated by Dermis Leon "The Conclusion of a Paradox", Venetia Kapernikas Gallery, curated by Noritoshi Hirakawa "The Last Year", Salle de Bains, Rotterdam "LoVe", Cynthia Braun Gallery, New York "Bloom", Lolocolmo, Brescia
- 1998 Identity Crisis, Spencer Brownstone Gallery, New York Male, Wessel O ëConnor Gallery, New York, curated by Vince Aletti
- 1996 "Voyeurs Delight", Franklin Furnace, New York "The Most Important Thing in the World, Oasis Vs.Blur and artists who Rock", curated by Bill Arning " Non! Pas comme ca!", CAN, Neuchatel, curated by Marc-Olivier Wahler
