= Neighborhood Public Radio =

American pirate radio station and arts collective

Programming
- Format: Pirate radio station

History
- First air date: 2004

Neighborhood Public Radio (NPR) was an independent arts collective and roving pirate radio station. Between 2004 and 2011, it broadcast intermittently from various locations in the United States and in Europe, as a very low-power, unlicensed FM station.

Its motto was, "If it's in the neighborhood and it makes noise ... we hope to put it on the air."

== Background ==
Neighborhood Public Radio was founded by Lee Montgomery, Michael Trigilio, and Jon Brumit in 2004. Lee Montgomery was a professor at Diablo Valley College who had experience with public radio as a DJ at KALX, broadcasting from the University of California at Berkeley, and had experimented with radio transmitters. He invited artist Jon Brumit to bring ideas on working with sound and public interaction. Multimedia artist Trigilio was a colleague of Montgomery's at Diablo Valley College, and had built his own radio transmitter previously.

Although Neighborhood Public Radio used a modified version of the National Public Radio logo and introduced its own series called "American Life" which evoked This American Life – the founders insisted that parody was not the main objective of the project.

Nevertheless, Neighborhood Public Radio often critiqued the state of public (and commercial) radio. For example, Montgomery once edited together a recording of every time NPR thanked one of its sponsors within a 24-hour period. The segment was 12 minutes long and the top sponsor was identified as Burger King.

== Projects ==
Its first broadcast in 2004 was a five-day run at 21 Grant gallery in Oakland, California. Since then, it took to the airwaves in a series of locations across the United States, including San Francisco; San Jose, California; Chicago; Albuquerque, New Mexico; and New York. It also broadcast from Serbia and Hamburg, Germany.

NPR had a long-standing partnership with the Southern Exposure gallery in San Francisco's Mission District. The project, which relied on interactions with passers-by in the neighborhood, often occupied the storefront of Artists' Television Access on the corner of 21st and Valencia Street.

Around 2007, Neighborhood Public Radio received $35,000 grant from the Creative Work Fund to finance its Radio Cartography project.

In 2008, it broadcast in Manhattan on 91.9 FM, with "hyperlocal" programs focusing on music, art, and public affairs. The FM signal could reach only 4,600 people within a three-square-block radius. It was featured as part of that year's Whitney Biennial.

In 2010, it was part of an exhibition at the Contemporary Museum in Baltimore, Maryland.

== Content ==
Programs on Neighborhood Public Radio were typically 30 to 60 minutes long. Content ranged in quality. Topics included local residents exchanging recipes and discussing their worst-ever neighbors. The format of the segments varied – from live band performances to man-on-the-street interviews, and roundtables of artists discussing their work.

== Collaborations ==
Along with many self-initiated projects, NPR collaborated on works with many non-profit arts spaces, museums, festivals, and fellow artist collaboratives such as:

- Southern Exposure
- Artists' Television Access
- 21 Grand
- of Novi Sad
- Serbia
- Whitney Museum of American Art
- ZeroOne Festival
- Red 76
- Hasan Elahi
