= Hannah Greely =

American mixed media artist

Hannah Greely (born 1979) is an American mixed media artist. She mainly creates site-specific sculptural works that seek to redefine the boundary between art and life. Her sculptures are colorful and often replicate ordinary objects or subjects, with subtle incongruencies in material or form. Her material experimentations lend the work an uncanny quality, as recognizable objects fade from real to fictional. Greely’s work explores open dialogue between object and environment, as well as the theatrical otherness of sculpture.

== Biography ==
Hannah Greely was born in Dickson, Tennessee, United States, and now lives in Los Angeles, California. Greely graduated with a BA from the University of California, Los Angeles, in 2002. She became an Artist in Residence at Bangkok University School of Fine and Applied Arts, Thailand in 2004. She went on to receive an MFA in 2016 from the University of California, Riverside.

== Exhibitions ==
Hannah Greely has exhibited her work worldwide. Her first solo exhibition, “Fold”, took place in 2004, at the Andrea Rosen Gallery in New York. “Wild Corner” was shown in Bernier/Eliades, Athens, Greece in 2011. In 2005, group exhibition “Uncertain States of America”, held at the Astrup Fearnley Museum of Modern Art in Oslo, Norway, toured to the Center of Curatorial Studies, Bard College, NY; the Serpentine Gallery, London, England; the Reykjavik Art Museum, Reykjavik, Iceland; the Herning Art Museum, Herning, Denmark; the Center for Contemporary Art Warsaw, Warsaw, Poland; and the Rudolphium Gallery, Prague, Czech Republic. Hannah Greely has participated in numerous group shows, two person, and solo shows. Her most recent exhibition was a group show titled “Daydreaming Pressed Against a Fence”, held at Harkawik gallery in Los Angeles in July 2023.

=== Solo and two person ===
==== 2018 ====
- Hannah Greely / Calvin Marcus/, San Francisco, CA

==== 2017 ====
- Hannah Greely, Parker Gallery, Los Angeles, CA

==== 2016 ====
- Avigdor Arikha / Hannah Greely, Michael Benevento, Los Angeles, CA
- Hannah Greely: Drawings, Cleopatra’s Gallery, New York, NY
- Hannah Greely, Dryad Gallery, Los Angeles, CA

==== 2012 ====
- Little Falls, Bob Van Orsouw Gallery, Zurich, Switzerland

==== 2011 ====
- Wild Corner, Bernier/Eliades, Athens, Greece

==== 2004 ====
- Fold, Andrea Rosen Gallery, New York, NY

=== Group ===
==== 2019 ====
- Frieze Los Angeles, Paramount Studios, Los Angeles, CA
- Pictionary Individual, Harkawik, Los Angeles, CA

==== 2018 ====
- Mythologies of a Sublime, Galeria Pedro Cera, Lisbon, Portugal
- Hannah Greely and William T. Wiley, Parker Gallery, Los Angeles

==== 2017 ====
- Nut Art, Parker Gallery, Los Angeles, CA

==== 2016 ====
- Los Angeles, — A Fiction, Astrup Fearnley Museum, Oslo, Norway
- Walk Artisanal, 3716 Eagle Rock Blvd, Los Angeles, CA
- Sculpture from the Hammer Contemporary Collection, Hammer Museum, Los Angeles, CA
- No Man’s Land, The Rubell Family Collection/Contemporary Art Foundation, Miami, FL
- Aperture, BLAM Gallery, Los Angeles, CA
- Master: UCR MFA Thesis Show, Culver Center for the Arts, Riverside, CA

==== 2015 ====
- UCR MFA 1st and 2nd Year Show, Riverside Art Museum, Riverside, CA

==== 2014 ====
- Transmogrification, Angels Gallery, Los Angeles, CA
- Beer, Green Gallery, Milwaukee, WI
- Another Cat Show, 356 Mission, Los Angeles, CA

2013

- Made in Space, Night Gallery, Los Angeles, CA

==== 2012 ====
- Prince at the Forum, Beacon Arts Building, Inglewood, CA

==== 2011 ====
- American Exuberance, The Rubell Family Collection/Contemporary Arts Foundation, Miami FL
- In the Name of the Artists, São Paulo Biennial Pavilion, São Paulo, Brazil
- I'll Be Your Mirror, The Sheldon Art Galleries, St. Louis and Monte Vista Projects, Los Angeles, CA

==== 2010 ====
- 2010: Whitney Biennial, Whitney Museum, New York, NY

==== 2009 ====
- Your Gold Teeth II, Marianne Boesky Gallery, New York, NY
- TIME-LIFE, Taxter and Spengemann, New York, NY
- Second Nature - The Valentine-Adelson Collection, Hammer Museum, Los Angeles, CA

==== 2008 ====
- High Desert Test Sites, organized by the Orange County Museum of Art as part of the California Biennial, Joshua Tree, CA
- Meet Me Around the Corner-Works from the Astrup Fearnley Collection, Astrup Fearnley Museum of Modern Art, Oslo, Norway

==== 2007 ====
- Close to Home: Recent Acquisitions of Los Angeles Art, Museum of Contemporary Art, Los Angeles, CA

==== 2006 ====
- Whitney Biennial 2006: Day for Night, Whitney Museum, New York, NY

==== 2005 ====
- THING: New Sculpture from Los Angeles, Hammer Museum, Los Angeles, CA
- Waste Material, The Drawing Room, London, England
- Uncertain States of America, Astrup Fearnley Museum of Modern Art, Oslo Norway

==== 2004 ====
- Faith Champion Fine Art, The Black Dragon Society, Los Angeles
- Winner, Bug Gallery, Bangkok University, Bangkok, Thailand

==== 2003 ====
- Clandestine, Arsenale, 50th Venice Biennale, Venice, Italy
- Another Sculpture Show, Angstrom Gallery, Dallas, TX
- Sculpture Show, Black Dragon Society, Los Angeles, CA
- Group Show, GrantSelwyn Fine Art, Los Angeles, CA
- Trace Plants, Latch Gallery, Los Angeles, CA

==== 2002 ====
- Hannah Greely, Elana Scherr, Tom Grimley, Black Dragon Society, Los Angeles, CA
- Drawing Show, Julius Hummel Gallery, Vienna, Austria
- Song Poems, Rosamund Felsen Gallery, Los Angeles, CA

==== 2001 ====
- Face Off, The Smell, Los Angeles, CA
- Spoils, Coleman Gallery, Los Angeles, CA
- Drawing Show, Black Dragon Society, Vienna, Austria
- Something of That Nature, Black Dragon Society, Los Angeles, CA

==== 2000 ====
- Sentimental Education, Deitch Projects, New York, NY

== Collections ==
Astrup-Fearnley Museum of Modern Art, Oslo, Norway

Museum of Contemporary Art, Los Angeles, CA

Rubell Family Collection, Miami, FL

UCLA Hammer Museum, Los Angeles, CA

== Honors ==
2015 UC Riverside MFA Fellowship

2005 Recipient of Louis Comfort Tiffany Foundation Award

== Articles ==
=== 2019 ===
- “Frieze-Frame”, Trinie Dalton, Artforum
- “Frieze and Felix Turn Heads in Los Angeles”, Jori Finkel, The New York Times
- “Frieze Los Angeles, like any art fair, can inspire a critic’s contempt. Alas, it’s hard to be a hater.” Christopher Knight, Los Angeles Times

=== 2018 ===
- “Hannah Greely and William T. Wiley at Parker Gallery”, Keith J. Varadi, Carla Issue 11

=== 2016 ===
- “Review: What to see in L.A. galleries”, David Pagel, The Los Angeles Times
- “Nada Art Fair Offers the Wacky and the Political, Plus Basketball”, Ken Johnson, The New York Times
- “Walk Artisanal”, Johnathan Griffin, Carla Issue 4

=== 2013 ===
- “Made in Space”, Roberta Smith, The New York Times

=== 2011 ===
- “‘Mirror’ Can Reflect with Humor and Unease”, Ivy Cooper, St. Louis Beacon
- “In the Galleries: ‘I’ll Be Your Mirror’ at The Sheldon Art Galleries”, Jessica Baran, Riverfront Times
- “Hannah Greely in Athens, Greece”, Stephanie Bailey, Artwrit

=== 2010 ===
- “Welcome to the Mixed-Up, Dialed Down 2010 Whitney Biennial”, Christian Viveros-Faune, The Village Voice

=== 2007 ===
- “Modesty Blessed: An Interview with Hannah Greely”, Kathryn Hargreaves, Citizen LA
- Robert L. Pincus, “ ‘Night’ watch.” San Diego Union Tribune March 19, 2006
- Brian Gopnik, “ Red, White, and Bleak.“ The Washington Post March 2, 2006

=== 2006 ===
- “Last Stand”, Lee Rosenbaum, CultureGrrl

2005

- Christopher Miles, “The Idolater’s Revenge: New Los Angeles Sculpture.” Flash Art May–June 2005
- Christopher Knight, “The next best ‘thing’ in LA.” The Los Angeles Times Feb. 9, 2005

2003

- Michael Kimmelman, “Cramming it all in at the Venice Biennial.” The New York Times June 26, 2003

2000

- Jerry Saltz, “Realm of the Senses.” The Village Voice July 5, 2000
