= Malcolm Bailey (artist) =

American artist

Malcolm Bailey (1947–2011) was an American artist. His work is held in the collections of the Whitney Museum of American Art, the Museum of Modern Art, and the Metropolitan Museum of Art.

== Early life and education ==
Bailey was born in Harlem in 1947. He studied at the High School of Art and Design in New York and the Pratt Institute in Brooklyn. He undertook residencies at Yaddo in Silver Springs, New York and the McDowell Colony in Petersbourgh, New Hampshire.

== Work ==
Bailey is best known for his Separate but Equal series made in the late 1960s: large scale paintings that appropriated and adapted eighteenth- and nineteenth-century abolitionist diagrams of the cargo ships that transported enslaved people from Africa to Jamaica.

The title of this series refers to the school desegregation case, Brown vs. Board of Education (1954) which overturned Plessy vs. Ferguson (1896), an earlier ruling that underpinned segregation in the U.S. as a system of 'separate but equal' for blacks and whites. Bailey himself said 'real revolution won't occur until poor whites as well as poor blacks realize they are oppressed', a position that art historian Cheryl Finley argues is epitomised by the black and white figures in the Separate but Equal paintings, who, as she writes, 'mirror and double each other, duplicating the same painful postures in the oppressive confines of a slave ship.'

== Selected exhibitions ==
- 'The Whitney's Collection: Selections from 1900 to 1965', Whitney Museum of American Art, New York, June 2019–ongoing
- 'Blue Black', Pulitzer Arts Foundation, St Louis, Missouri June–October 2017
- 'America Is Hard to See', Whitney Museum of American Art, New York, May–September 2015
- 'Open Ends', Museum of Modern Art, New York, September 2000–March 2001
- 'Selected Works by Black Artists from the Collection of The Metropolitan Museum of Art,' New York City Department of Parks and Recreation, The Arsenal, February–March 1979
- 'Whitney Biennial 1973', Whitney Museum of American Art, January–March 1973
- 'A Selection of Drawings and Watercolors from the Museum Collection', Museum of Modern Art, New York, May–October 1971
- Cinque Gallery, New York, December 1969
