= Robert Bittenbender =

American artist

- Born: United States
- Education: Cooper Union; BFA, 2012; SAIC; MFA, 2006–2007

Robert Bittenbender is an American mixed media artist living and working in Brooklyn, New York. In 2019, Bittenbender was selected to participate in the Whitney Biennial 2019.

== Artistic practice ==
Bittenbender's work often consists of complex assemblages, using a spectrum of materials from found materials, printed materials, zip-ties, photographs, paint, purchased materials, and/or others. Their works have been described as "complex nests."

=== Solo exhibitions ===
- Metropolitan - HIGH ART - Paris, France (2015-2016)
- The Aviary - LOMEX - New York (2017)
- Cosmo Freak - LOMEX - New York (2018)
- Space Vixen - LOMEX - New York (2019)

=== Group exhibitions ===
- These Are Not My Horses - James Fuentes (2015)
- A Wasteland - LOMEX, New York City (2015-2016)
- Looking Back / The 11th White Columns Annual - White Columns (2017)
- Ormai - Balice Hertling, Paris (2018)
- Foundation for Contemporary Arts 2018 Benefit Exhibition (2018)
- Whitney Biennial (2019) - curated by Rujeko Hockley and Jane Panetta

=== Awards ===
- NYSCA/NYFA Artist Fellowship Program grant (2017)
