= Suzan Frecon =

American contemporary artist (born 1941)

- Born: 1941 (age 84–85); Mexico, Pennsylvania
- Known for: Painting

Suzan Frecon (born 1941 in Mexico, Pennsylvania) is a contemporary artist who lives and works in New York. She is represented by Lawrence Markey, San Antonio and David Zwirner, New York.

Frecon received a BFA from Pennsylvania State University, University Park, Pennsylvania and subsequently studied painting at the University of Strasbourg, Strasbourg, France and École Nationale Superiéure des Beaux Arts, Paris, France.

== Work ==
Suzan Frecon is a painter known for her large scale abstract works. She describes her artistic practice as a quest, saying, "I seek for my paintings to reach a high, pure form of abstraction, so that they exist on their own strength as painting, without the embellishment, or distraction, or subject or story." She is critically acclaimed for her arrangement of color, form, and texture and for the philosophical resonance of her art.

While best known for her large, immersive oil paintings, Frecon's small watercolors, delicate works on paper, constitute a significant part of her work. Frecon has been making watercolors and oil paintings simultaneously for more than two decades. she began concentrating more intensely on the watercolors during an illness in the late 1980s when she needed a smaller format that didn't require as much physical labor.

== Exhibitions ==
Frecon's first solo exhibition at David Zwirner, New York was on view in the fall of 2010. On the occasion of the exhibition, a catalogue was published by Radius Books, Santa Fe, New Mexico. It features a text by art historian Joachim Pissarro as well as illustrations of her most recent large-scale oil paintings.

Other major solo exhibitions include the Menil Collection, Houston, Texas (2008), Kunstmuseum Bern, Bern, Switzerland (2006 and 2008), and The Drawing Center, New York (2002). Recently, her work was the focus of another solo exhibition at David Zwirner, entitled oil paintings and sun. Her work has also been included in the Whitney Biennial at the Whitney Museum of American Art in 2000 and 2010.

Frecon's works are represented in the permanent collections of prominent institutions, including the National Gallery of Art, Washington, D.C.; The Museum of Modern Art, New York; the Whitney Museum of American Art, New York; the Menil Collection, Houston; and the Fogg Museum in Cambridge, Massachusetts.

== Awards ==
In 2001, she was awarded an individual support award from the Adolph and Esther Gottlieb Foundation. From 2004, she has been a member of the Elizabeth Foundation for the Arts studios in Manhattan. In 2022, she was inducted into the American Academy of Arts and Letters. In 2025, Frecon was awarded the Alexej von Jawlensky Prize by the state capital of Wiesbaden. The award ceremony will take place on the occasion of the 2027 exhibition associated with the prize at the Museum Wiesbaden.
