= Adam Putnam (artist) =

American artist

- Born: 1973; New York City
- Education: BFA Parsons School of Design, New York, NY; MFA Yale School of Art, New Haven, CT
- Known for: Photography

Adam Putnam (born 1973, New York) is an American visual artist working primarily with photography, drawing, and performance art. Putnam is a Visiting Associate Professor at Pratt Institute in Brooklyn, New York.

== Career ==
Adam Putnam holds a BFA from Parsons School of Design, New York (1995), and an MFA from Yale School of Art, New Haven (2000). In 2008, Putnam exhibited the video piece The Way Out (2005) at the Whitney Biennial.

In 2020, the photo book Portholes: Photographs by Adam Putnam, with text by Lauren O'Neill-Butler in conversation with Adam Putnam was published by Penumbra Foundation.

Putnam's solo exhibition Holes in New York at PPow gallery expanded on the artist's practice by exhibiting photography, drawing, sculpture, film, and performance pieces to comment on image-making in relation to nature and environmental issues.

Putnam's work has been featured in international contemporary art exhibitions such as the Whitney Biennial 2008, New York; Busan Biennale 2008, South Korea; and the Moscow Biennale of Contemporary Art, Russia. His work was also on view at MoMA PS1, Queens, and Artists Spaces, in New York's Tribeca neighborhood. Adam Putnam's work is included in the collections of the Pérez Art Museum Miami, Florida, and the Nasher Museum of Art, North Carolina.
