= Connie Zehr =

American installation artist (1938–2025)

- Born: January 17, 1938; Evanston, Illinois, U.S.
- Died: April 4, 2025 (aged 87)
- Education: Ohio State University
- Occupation: Installation artist
- Website: conniezehr.com

Connie Zehr (January 17, 1938 – April 4, 2025) was an American installation artist whose work involved sand, clay, glass, and sculpture. Zehr was a key artist in the Los Angeles Light and Space Movement and was most notable for her mounded sand installations. One of Zehr's sand installations was exhibited at the 1975 Whitney Biennial. An extensive collection of Zehr's work is included in the Archives of American Art at the Smithsonian.

== Early life and education ==
As a child, Zehr was raised on her grandfather's Amish farm in Indiana. Her grandfather's farm was called Sand HiIl, a place where she played in dirt and sand as a child which she credits to her continued use of earth materials in her practice. Zehr often shares a memory of when she was 6 years old receiving gifts at Christmas. She recounts that her mother received colored pencils while Zehr received perfume. She remembers distinctly saying that she should have received the colored pencils because she was "an artist."

At 16 years old, and while in high school, Zehr lived in India for a short time while her father was there on a Point 4 program. While in India she helped a local artist in her studio. She credits this experience with being her first introduction to what an artist does. On their way back home to Ohio, Zehr says the family travelled through Europe visiting museums.

Zehr studied briefly at Michigan State University before transferring to Ohio State University, noting finances as the reason for the transfer.

In 1960, Zehr earned her BFA degree from Ohio State University.

While at Ohio State, Zehr met fellow sculptor David Elder who was a Teaching assistant in one of her courses and whom she married upon graduation.

== Early career ==
In 1964, while pregnant with her first child, Zehr and her husband moved to Los Angeles where she found a community of artists working with unconventional materials and experimentation which would later define the Light and Space Movement. Zehr mentions her contemporaries at the time, Barry Le Va, Allen Ruppersberg, Robert Irwin, and Judy Chicago, using "a variety of materials in unusual ways." Zehr embraced this experimental process, dabbling in several emerging movement including earth art, conceptual art, feminist art, Op Art, and Minimalism. Her installation works at this time were complex, but minimal, focusing on the use of silica sand in vast temporary exhibits.

Zehr mentioned seeing and being inspired by one of Judy Chicago's Smoke pieces as the first time she saw a work of art that was ephemeral and "relied on your visual memory." Zehr also credits being inspired at this time by an installation of talcum work by Barry Le Va.

Zehr's first exhibition was held at Mount San Antonio College in the late 1960s and was called "Mound Fields", consisting of mounds of sand that people could walk amongst and between.

== Mid career ==
In 1975, Zehr was invited to be part of the Whitney Biennial where she exhibited a large, elongated mound of sand.

In 1982, Zehr began teaching art at the Claremont Graduate University in Southern California while continuing to exhibit nationally and internationally. While at Claremont, Zehr began to expand her installation practice by incorporating glass into her temporary installations.

== Later career ==
In 1987, the Los Angeles Municipal Art Gallery (Los Angeles, California) held an exhibition retrospective of Zehr's work where in its 10,000 sq ft. space, she recreated installations of her six major sand works.

In 1997, ten years later, the Los Angeles Municipal Art Gallery again held an exhibition of Zehr's work where over the span of three months, she created three new installations.

After teaching at Claremont Graduate University during 1982–2009, Zehr retired as a Professor Emeritus.

In 2010, Zehr left California and moved to Horseheads, New York.

Zehr died on April 4, 2025, at the age of 87.

== Installation process ==
Zehr considers her installations as paintings with the floor being a large canvas. Before conceptualizing her installation, she needs to know the traffic flow of the room and where the doors are located because she says she prefers people to be able to walk around her installations. In her early work, Zehr would often create a grid on the floor using tape to mark the mounds and establish the work's diameter. Often she marked the major elements and then went back to fill them in.

Zehr mentions never using tools to create her installations and equates this decision with being a "feminine" decision based on women "being practical people, hav[ing] to do things by themselves." Her work is scaled to her own body.

== Exhibitions ==
Zehr's installation exhibitions have been created nationally and internationally in numerous galleries and museums, including creating on-site installations in museums and galleries nationally and internationally, e.g.: The Museum of Contemporary Art (Chicago, Illinois); The Whitney Museum of American Art (New York City, New York); Taipei Fine Art Museum (Taipei, Taiwan); Pasadena Art Museum (Pasadena, California); Wadsworth Atheneum (Hartford, Connecticut); Salvatori Ala Galeria (Milan, Italy); and university galleries.

== Collections ==
Zehr's work is included as part of the Archives of American Art at the Smithsonian.
