= Dala Nasser =

Lebanese interdisciplinary artist (born 1990)

Dala Nasser (born 1990) is a Lebanese multidisciplinary artist based between Beirut and London. Her exhibitions have been reviewed in publications including Frieze, Artforum, Hyperallergic, and The Brooklyn Rail.

== Early life and education ==
Born in Tyre, Lebanon, Nasser attended International College, Beirut. She received her Bachelors in Fine Arts in Painting in 2016 from University College London, Slade School of Fine Art. Followed by a Master of Fine Arts in Painting and Printmaking from the Yale University, Yale School of Art in 2021.

== Work and practice ==
Nasser works across painting and installation, often using materials such as soil, ash, and plant-based pigments applied to textiles and stretcher bars to create large format installations. Her works use materials gathered from relevant geographical and historical locations.

Writing in Frieze, curator Chrissie Iles stated that Nasser’s materials function as “witness[es] to historical and political conditions”. In Texte zur Kunst, Taylor Stanton discussed her work in relation to colonial histories and material processes.

== Exhibitions ==
Notable solo shows include Adonis River (2023) at the Renaissance Society in Chicago and Cemetery of Martyrs (2026) at Nottingham Contemporary in the United Kingdom.

Her work was included in the 2022 Carnegie International, the 2024 Whitney Biennial, and the 2025 Aichi Triennale.

== Awards and recognition ==
Nasser has been awarded the inaugural Frieze Abu Dhabi Artist Award.

Nasser has received the Isola Sicilia Award.

She was included in a 2025 Artnet News list of artists to watch and in an Artsy editorial feature on the Aichi Triennale.
