= Arlene Slavin =

American artist (born 1942)

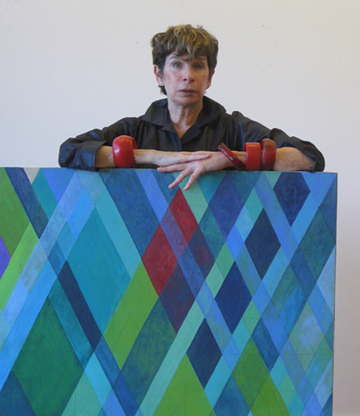
- Born: October 26, 1942 (age 83); Brooklyn, New York
- Education: Cooper Union School of Art and Architecture; Pratt Institute
- Movement: Pattern and Decoration
- Spouse: Eric Bregman
- Awards: National Endowment in the Arts
- Website: https://www.arleneslavin.com/

Arlene Slavin (born 1942, Brooklyn, New York) is a painter, sculptor, and a print-maker whose practice also includes large-scale public art commissions. Slavin is a 1977 National Endowment for the Arts Grant recipient.

== Personal life and education ==
Arlene Eisenberg was born on October 26, 1942, in Brooklyn, New York, to Sally and Louis Eisenberg.

She studied painting at Cooper Union School of Art and Architecture and earned a Bachelor of Fine Arts degree in 1964. She received a Masters of Fine Arts from Pratt Institute in 1967.

Slavin lives and works in New York City and Wainscott, New York.

== Career ==
Slavin takes a multi-discipline approach to her work. A painter, print maker, and sculptor—she has created small scale folding screens as well as numerous large scale outdoor public commissions.

=== Pattern and decoration ===
In the 1970s, Slavin developed a diagonal pencil grid system that served as the base for her geometric abstractions. Using layers of overlapping shimmering color woven into her grid, she painted many large scale works. Slavin's influences are in non-western art including: Japanese folding screens and woodblocks, Indian miniatures, Islamic tile work, and Byzantine mosaics. Slavin's work aligned with the Pattern and Decoration movement, showing in Pattern and Decoration group exhibitions, most recently at the Museum of Contemporary Art, Los Angeles, California, in With Pleasure: Pattern and Decoration in American Art, 1972-1985.

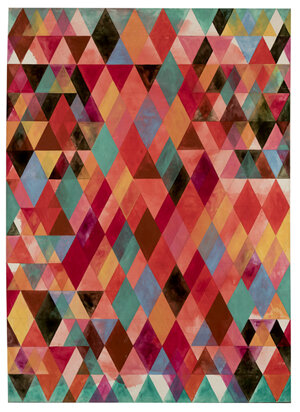
Arlene Slavin at With Pleasure: Pattern and Decoration in American Art, 1972-1985

=== Public art ===
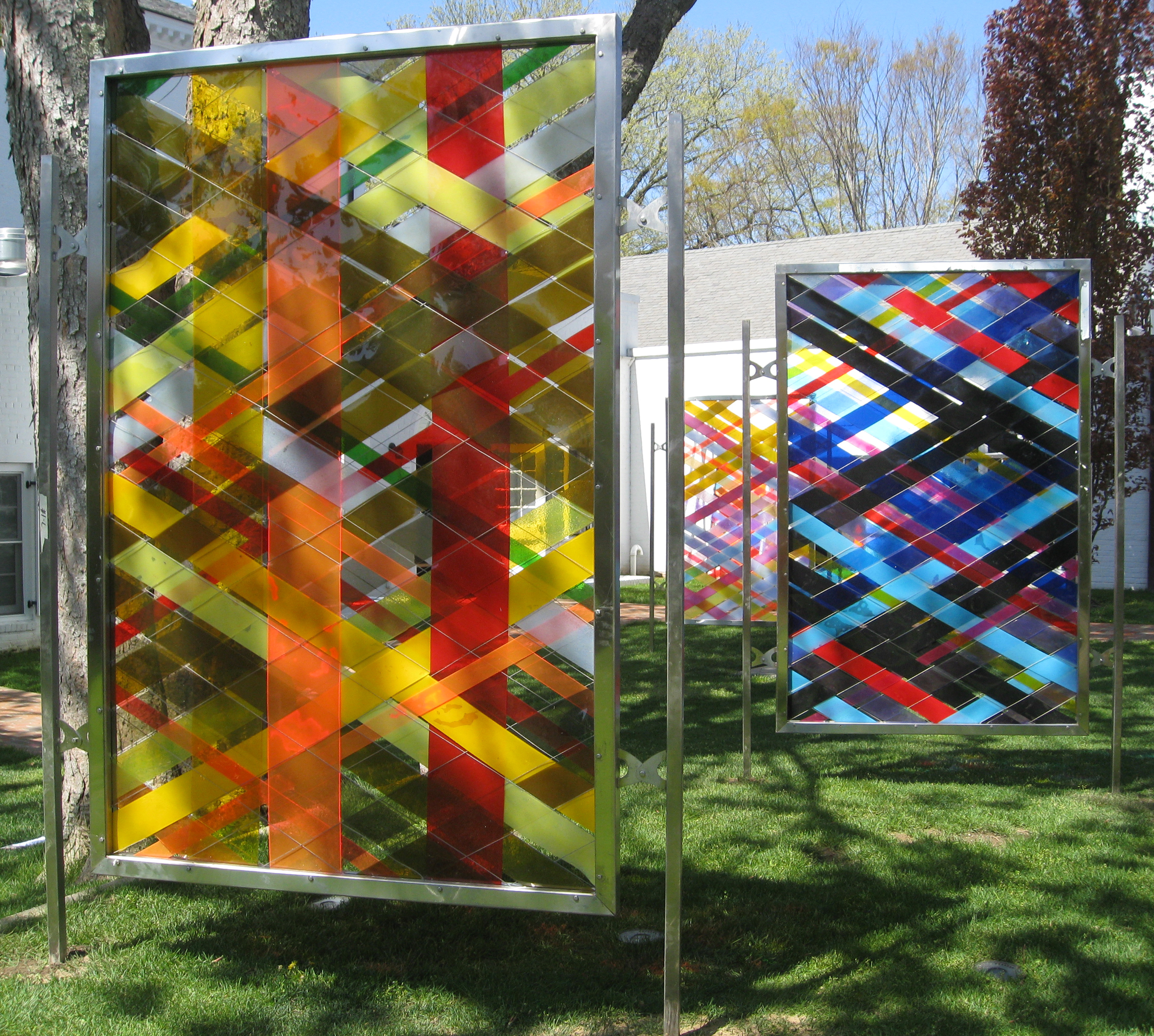
Intersections Sculpture #8 at Guild Hall exhibition, Arlene Slavin: Intersections, 2014

Slavin's Public Art commissions grew out of her painted folding screens. Initially, she constructed the first screens using paper, in the manner of traditional Japanese folding screen artists. Later screens used wood. Always exploring new materials, Slavin turned to laser-cut steel. Steel was a perfect material for ornamental fences, gates and sculpture in the unguarded public space. Her public work also consists of carved glass wind screens, cast concrete sculptures, terrazzo flooring, steel seating and colored polymer window films.

Slavin developed and installed 28 Public Art projects, including:

- 2006- Island Beach State Park, New Jersey, Fisherman's Rest Facility Steel Sculpture
- 2004- Assunpink Wildlife Center, New Jersey, Entry Steel Sculptures
- 2002- Chapel Hill Public Art Commission, North Carolina, Stainless Steel Art Benches
- 2003- Hoboken Terminal Station, NJ Transit, 8 Carved Glass Windscreen Murals
- 2001- Temple Israel, Ridgewood, New Jersey, Wall-Painted Sculpture-Donor Wall
- 2000- Forest City Ratner, Brooklyn, New York, Ornamental Gates & Fences, Hardy Holzman Pfeiffer Associates
- 2000- Hebrew Home & Hospital, West Hartford, Connecticut, Tree of Remembrance, Painted Wall Sculpture
- 1999- North Carolina Zoological Park, Asheboro, North Carolina, 4 Large Scale Entry Steel Sculptures
- 1999- Middletown Station, NJ Transit, Weathervanes, Fence Embellishments
- 1999- The Richard Stockon College of New Jersey, Concrete Gateway Sculptures & Terrazzo Floor
- 1999- PS 87 Playground, New York, 3 Concrete Buffalo Sculptures & Ornamental Fencing
- 1999- Liberty State Park Station, NJ Transit Paving Insert, Etched Glass, Seating, Tree Gates & Platform Inserts
- 1998- Congregation Tifereth Jacob, California, Tree of Life, Painted Steel Sculpture, Signage
- 1998- Fort Tryon Park, New York, Steel Animal Art Panels & 7 Gates
- 1998- J Hood Wright Park, New York, Gates, Fences, Guardrails & Paving Inserts
- 1996- Staten Island Jewish Community Center, Tree of Life, Painted Wall Sculpture Signage
- 1995- PS 130 (DeSoto School), New York, Railings, Main Stairway and Steel Wall Sculpture/Member Design Team
- 1991- Henry Street Settlement, New York, Steel Fence for Sculpture Garden/Member Design Team
- 1989- City of New York Parks and Recreation, Central Park, New York, Steel Bear Sculpture/ Bench, Grant
- 1989- Cathedral of St. John the Divine, New York, Cathedral Bestiary, Steel Gates
- 1986- Bellevue Hospital Center, New York, Children's Psychiatric Unit, Mural
- 1983- Hudson River Museum, New York, Museum Cafe, Hudson River Trilogy, Three Room Dividers
- 1983- Albert Einstein School of Medicine, New York, Hospital Lobby, Mural
- 1983- Public Art Fund, New York, Chelsea Swimming Pool, Mural

== Awards and honors ==
- 1991- Threshold Foundation Grant for Decorative Gates at Henry Street Settlement
- 1977- National Endowment for the Arts Grant in Printmaking

== Exhibitions ==
Slavin has had a variety of solo and group exhibitions. Her work has been exhibited in the Whitney Biennial and other museums and galleries since the 1970s. In 2015, she installed six sculptures in Pratt Sculpture Park, Brooklyn, New York. The Bronx Museum showed her Intersection Sculpture Series in 2017. She has recently been exhibited at Museum of Contemporary Art, Los Angeles, California, in With Pleasure: Pattern and Decoration in American Art, 1972-1985.

== Grant panelist ==
- 1996- NYC Percent for Art/ Public Art- Queens Supreme Courthouse
- 1978- NY State Creative Arts Projects/ Graphics

== Collections ==
Her works is in various museums and public collections, including:

- Metropolitan Museum of Art, New York, NY
- Brooklyn Museum, Brooklyn, NY
- Fogg Art Museum, Harvard University, Cambridge, MA
- Allen Memorial Art Museum, Oberlin, OH
- University of California, Berkeley Art Gallery, Berkeley, CA
- Smithsonian Institution, Washington D.C
- Norton Museum of Art, Palm Beach, FL
- Portland Museum, Portland, OR
- Neuberger Museum of Art, Purchase, NY
- Heckscher Museum of Art, Yonkers, NY
- Hudson River Museum, Yonkers, NY
- Harry N. Abrams Family Collection, NY
- Radford University Art Museum, Radford, VA
- University of Colorado, Colorado Springs, CO
- Colby College Museum of Art, Waterville, ME
- Skowhegan Art School, ME
- Albert Einstein College of Medicine, Bronx, NY
- Cincinnati Museum of Art, Cincinnati, OH
- Guild Hall of East Hampton, East Hampton, NY
- Orlando Museum of Art, Orlando, FL
- New York Health and Hospital Corporation NY
- The City University of New York, NY
- NYC Department of Parks & Recreation, NY
- Chase Bank, NY
- NJ Transit, NJ
- Stockton University, Galloway, NJ
