= Paula Barr =

American artist

Paula Barr (born 1945) is an American photographer and painter.

Barr's work is held in the permanent collections of the Brooklyn Museum and the Center for Book Arts.

Her work has been exhibited in the Whitney Biennial of 1973, and in 'Bookworks' at the Museum of Modern Art in 1977.

Barr received a National Endowment for the Arts grant in 1974.
