= Gerald McMaster =

First Nations Artist, curator, art writer and academic

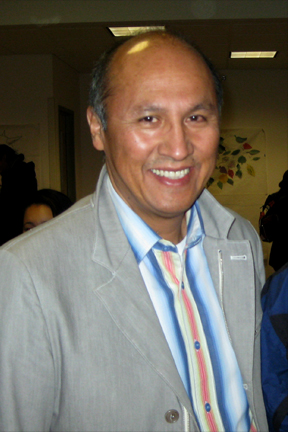
- Born: March 9, 1953 (age 73)
- Citizenship: Siksika Nation and Canada
- Occupations: curator, artist, author

Gerald Raymond McMaster CM (born 9 March 1953, in North Battleford) is a curator, artist, and author and a Plains Cree member of the Siksika Nation. McMaster is Professor Emeritus of Critical Curatorial Studies and Indigenous Visual Culture Studies. He is a former Tier 1 Canada Research Chair and was director of the Wapatah Centre for Indigenous Visual Knowledge at OCAD University. He was formerly the adjunct curator at the Remai Modern in Saskatoon, Saskatchewan.

== Early life and education ==
Gerald McMaster was born in 1953 and grew up on the Red Pheasant First Nation reserve in Saskatchewan, Canada. His father is Blackfoot, while his mother is Plains Cree. He says he grew up listening to the Lone Ranger and Hopalong Cassidy on the radio, while avidly reading western comic books – all of which would later influence his art.

McMaster says, "I've been an urban Indian since the age of nine. I've attended art school in the United States, trained in the Western tradition; yet I am referred to as an 'Indian' artist. I have danced and sung in the traditional powwow style of Northern Plains, yet my musical tastes are global ..."

McMaster studied art at the Institute of American Indian Arts in Santa Fe, New Mexico, from 1973 to 1975. He earned his BFA from the Minneapolis College of Art and Design in Minneapolis, Minnesota. He earned his master's degree in Anthropology and Sociology at Carleton University in Ottawa, Ontario, and continued his studies at the University of Amsterdam in the Netherlands.

== Artwork ==
McMaster draws and paints with humour and an ironic juxtaposition of traditional and contemporary pop culture elements. Identities, fluid and multiple, are central to his art practice. In his piece Eclectic Baseball, "traditional Plains Indian symbols of warfare and sacred ceremony were freely mixed with symbols and actual equipment of contemporary baseball". One of his best known series is The cowboy/Indian Show. Hide painting, pictographs, and petroglyphs inspire his methods of representation. He works in oil and acrylic.

In 1995, he ceased being a full-time artist in order to devote more time to curating, critical theory, and writing.

== Career ==
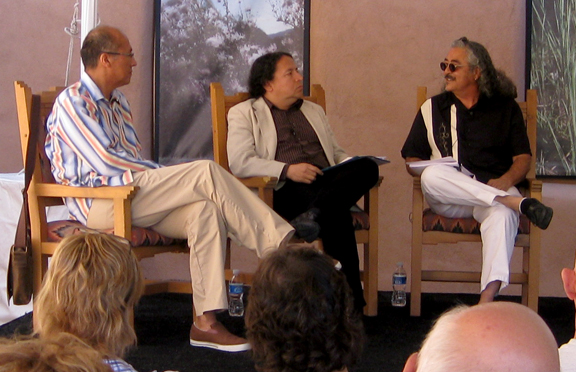
Gerald McMaster (leftmost) in a panel discussion with Paul Chaat Smith and Joseph Sanchez

From 1977 to 1981, McMaster directed the Indian Art Program and was an instructor at the First Nations University of Canada (formerly known as Saskatchewan Indian Federated College) at the University of Regina in Saskatchewan. Beginning in 1981, he was curator of Contemporary Indian Art at the Canadian Museum of Civilization in Ottawa.

McMaster has curated a number of thought-provoking contemporary Native art shows, including INDIGENA at the Canadian Museum of Civilization. In 2011, he curated with Ingo Hessel Inuit Modern at the Art Gallery of Ontario in Toronto. In 1995, McMaster curated Edward Poitras's exhibition at the Biennale di Venezia. In 2005, Poitras, of Gordon First Nation, was the first aboriginal artist to represent Canada in the Biennale di Venezia. In 2012, McMaster was the co-artistic director of the Biennale of Sydney.

He served as the director's special assistant and deputy assistant director for cultural resources at the National Museum of the American Indian in New York City from 2000 to 2004. He worked with the permanent collections there, as well as curating the shows, First American Art in 2004 and New Tribe/New York in 2005. He was curator of Canadian art at the Art Gallery of Ontario from 2004 until 2012, when he was succeeded by Andrew Hunter.

In 2018, together with David Fortin, McMaster co-curated the "Unceded: Voices of the Land" exhibition at the Venice Architecture Biennale, which featured the work of Indigenous architects from Canada.

In 2020, McMaster published Iljuwas Bill Reid: Life & Work through the Art Canada Institute. The book is one of the first comprehensive documentations of the artist's storied career and affinity for his indigenous heritage.

McMaster curated the exhibition "Postcommodity: Time Holds All the Answers" by the interdisciplinary arts collective Postcommodity, featuring Cristóbal Martínez and Kade L. Twist. The exhibition was on view at Remai Modern from 2021 to 2022.

In 2022, McMaster was the lead curator of the "Arctic/Amazon: Networks of Global Indigeneity" exhibition held at The Power Plant Contemporary Art Gallery. This exhibition featured work by artists from across three continents: Sonya Kelliher-Combs, Tanya Lukin Linklater, Couzyn van Heuvelen, Máret Ánne Sara, Uýra, Olinda Reshijabe Silvano, Morzaniel Iramari, Leandro Lima & Gisela Motta, Sheroanawe Hakihiiwe, Pia Arke, and Outi Pieski. A book by the same name, Arctic/Amazon: Networks of Global Indigeneity, was edited by McMaster and published in 2023 and includes a major contribution by him.

== Awards and honors ==
- 2005 - National Aboriginal Achievement Award.
- 2006 - Order of Canada.
- 2014 - Honorary Doctorate of Letters from the Emily Carr University of Art and Design.
- 2017 - Tier 1 Canada Research Chair in Indigenous Visual Culture and Curatorial Practice.
- 2019 - Honorary Doctorate of Letters from the University of Saskatchewan.
- 2021 - OCAD University Award for Distinguished Research, Scholarship and Creative Activity.
- 2022 - Governor General's Awards in Visual and Media Arts - Outstanding Contribution Award.

== Exhibitions ==
- "In the Shadow of the Sun." Ottawa: Canadian Museum of Civilization, 1988.
- "Indigena: Contemporary Native Perspectives." Ottawa: Canadian Museum of Civilization, 1992.
- "Venice Bienelle - Edward Poitras." Venice, 1995.
- "Plains Indian Ledger Drawings." New York City: Drawing Center, 1996.
- "Reservation X: The Power of Place." Ottawa: Canadian Museum of Civilization, 1997.
- "Norval Morrisseau/Copper Thunderbird: Draw and Tell: Lines of Transformation." New York City: Drawing Center, 2001.
- "First American Art: The Charles and Valerie Diker Collection of American Indian Art." New York City: National Museum of the American Indian, 2004.
- "New Tribe New York." New York City: National Museum of the American Indian, 2005 to 2006.
- "Inuit Modern." Toronto: Art Gallery of Ontario, 2010.
- "Biennale of Sydney." Sydney, 2012.
- "Before and After the Horizon: Anishinaabe Artists of the Great Lakes." New York City: National Museum of the American Indian, 2014.
- "The Faraway Nearby: Photographs of Canada from The New York Times Photo Archive." Toronto: The Image Centre, 2017.
- "Venice Architecture Biennale - Unceded: Voices in the Land." Venice, 2018.
- "Peripheral Vision(s)." Hamilton: McMaster Museum of Art, 2019 to 2020.
- "Postcommodity: Time Holds All the Answers." Saskatoon: Remai Modern, 2021 to 2022.
- "Arctic/Amazon: Networks of Global Indigeneity." Toronto: The Power Plant Contemporary Art Gallery, 2022.
- "Contact Zones: Gerald McMaster and the Reshaping of Canadian Art History", Library and Archives, National Gallery of Canada, 2026.

== Selected published works ==
- McMaster, Gerald, Jennifer S. H. Brown, Clara Hargittay, and Shirley J. R. Madill. Robert Houle: Indians from A to Z. Goose Lane Editions, 1990. ISBN 978-0-88915-156-7.
- McMaster, Gerald and Lee-Ann Martin. Indigena. Contemporary native perspectives in Canadian art. 1992. ASIN B0010YFFSC.
- McMaster, Gerald. Edward Poitras: Canada Xlvi Biennale Di Venezia. Seattle: University of Washington Press, 1995. ISBN 978-0-660-50753-8.
- McMaster, Gerald. Mary Longman: Traces. Exhibition catalogue. Kamloops, BC: Kamloops Art Gallery, 1996.
- McMaster, Gerald. Jeffery Thomas: Portraits from the Dancing Grounds. Exhibition catalogue. Ottawa: Ottawa Art Gallery, 1996
- McMaster, Gerald. "Museums and Galleries as Sites for Artistic Intervention", In The Subjects of Art History: Historical Objects in Contemporary Perspectives. Eds. Mark A. Cheetham, Michael Ann Holly, and Keith Moxey. Oxford: Oxford University Press: 250–261. 1998.
- McMaster, Gerald. The New Tribe: Critical Perspectives and Practices in Aboriginal Contemporary Art. Amsterdam: Acedemisch Proefschrift, University of Amsterdam, 1999. ASIN B001ELWQLK.
- McMaster, Gerald. Reservation X. Seattle: University of Washington Press, 1999. ISBN 978-0-295-97775-1.
- McMaster, Gerald and Clifford E. Trafzer, eds. Native Universe: Voices of Indian America: Native American Tribal Leaders, Writers, Scholars, and Story Tellers. National Geographic, 2004. ISBN 978-1-4262-0335-0.
- McMaster, Gerald, Bruce Bernstein, Kathleen Ash-Milby, eds. First American Art: The Charles and Valerie Diker Collection of American Indian Art. Washington DC: National Museum of the American Indian, 2004. ISBN 978-0-295-98403-2.
- McMaster, Gerald and Joe Baker, ed. Remix: New Modernities in a Post-Indian World. Washington DC: National Museum of the American Indian, 2007. ISBN 978-1-933565-10-1.
- McMaster, Gerald. Iljuwas Bill Reid: Life & Work. Toronto: Art Canada Institute, 2020. ISBN 978-1-4871-0242-5.
- McMaster, Gerald and Nina Vincent, eds. Arctic/Amazon: Networks of Global Indigeneity. Goose Lane Editions, 2023. ISBN 978-1-77310-299-3.
