= Raven Chacon =

Navajo composer and artist from New Mexico (born 1977)

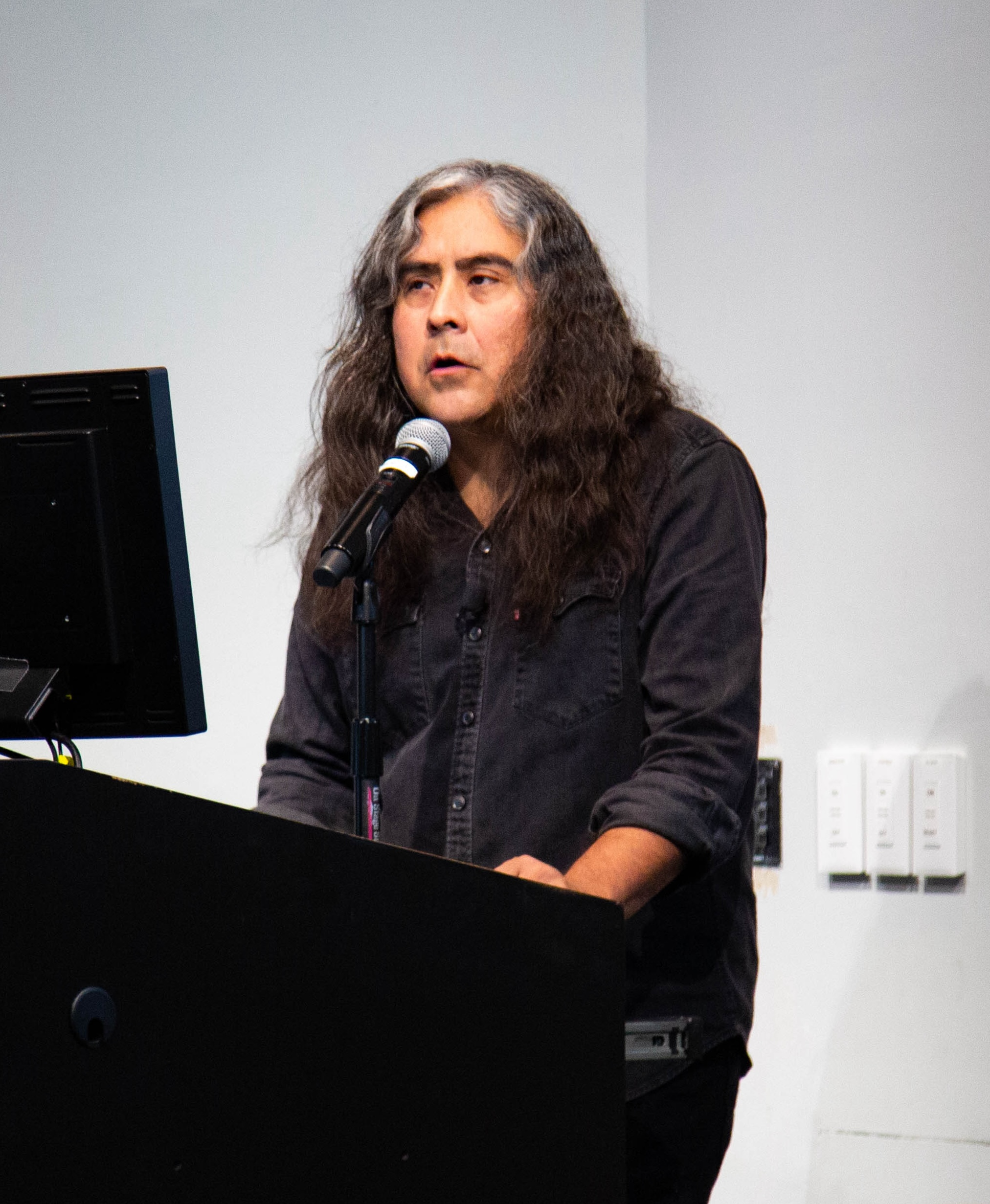
- Chacon speaking at Columbia University in 2022
- Born: 1977 (age 48–49); Fort Defiance, Arizona, United States
- Citizenship: Navajo Nation and U.S.
- Education: California Institute of the Arts University of New Mexico
- Known for: sound art, non-vocal instrumentalist, installation art, composer, musician, visual artist
- Style: noise music, experimental sound, composer, musician, visual artist
- Awards: MacArthur Fellowship 2023 Pulitzer Prize 2022
- Website: spiderwebsinthesky.com

Raven Chacon (born 1977) is a Diné composer, musician, and artist. Born in Fort Defiance, Arizona within the Navajo Nation, Chacon became the first Native American to win a Pulitzer Prize for Music, for his Voiceless Mass in 2022.

He has also been a solo performer of noise music and worked with groups such as Postcommodity.

== Life and career ==
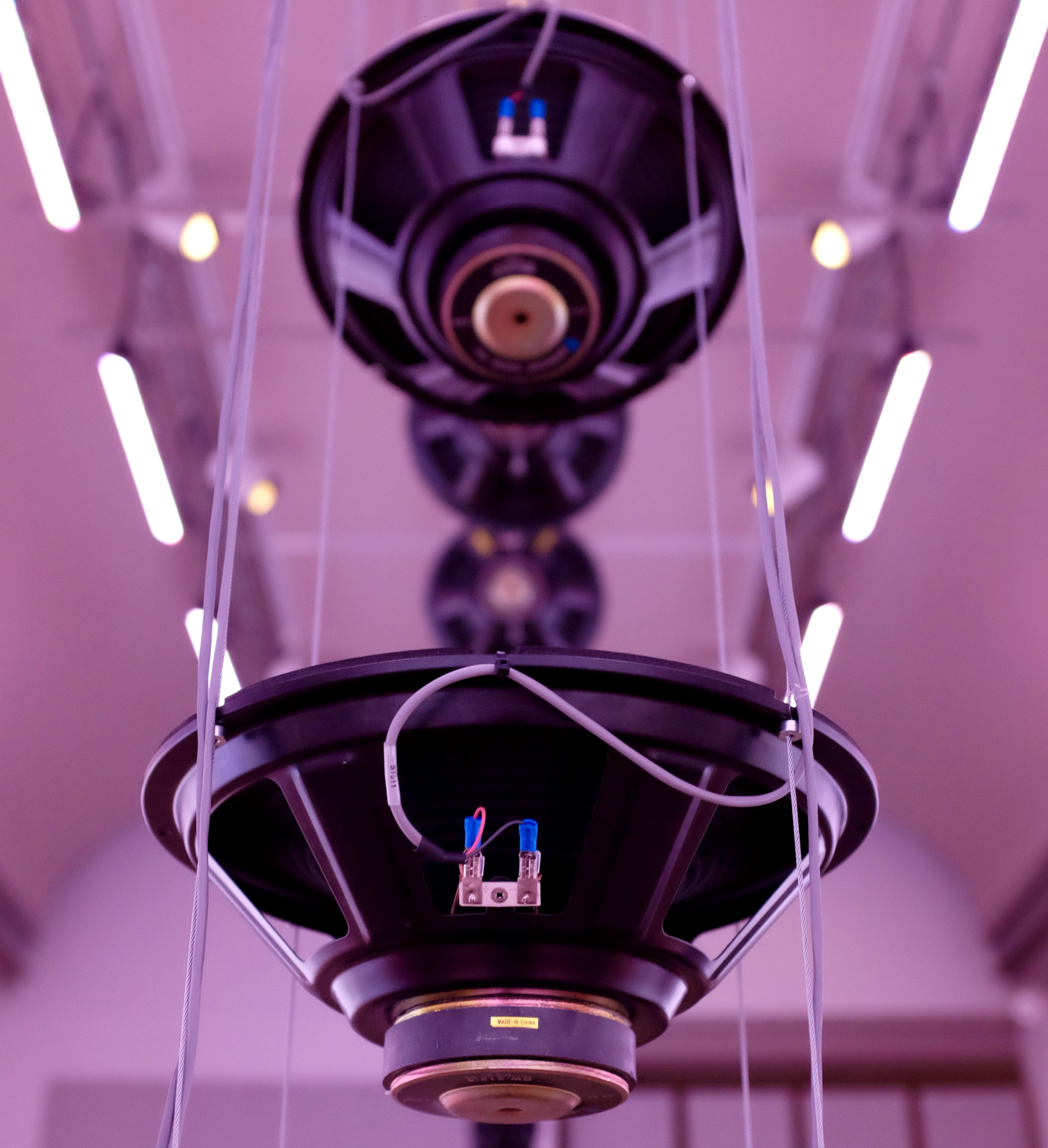
Still Life #3, detail of sound installation at the National Museum of the American Indian

Raven Chacon was born in 1977 in Fort Defiance, Arizona, within the Navajo Nation. He attended the University of New Mexico, where he obtained his BA in Fine Arts in 2001, then received an MFA in music composition from the California Institute of the Arts in 2004. He was a student of James Tenney, Morton Subotnick, Michael Pisaro, Wadada Leo Smith and Christopher Shultis.

Chacon's visual and sonic artwork has been exhibited widely in the U.S. and abroad. His room-sized sound and text installation, Still Life, #3 (2015), was exhibited in the Transformer: Native Art in Light and Sound exhibition at the National Museum of the American Indian, New York. His collective and solo work has been presented at Sydney Biennale, Kennedy Center, the Whitney Biennial, documenta 14, Adelaide International, Vancouver Art Gallery, ASU Art Museum, Musée d'art contemporain de Montréal, the San Francisco Electronic Music Festival, the Heard Museum, Chaco Canyon, and Performance Today.

Chacon also performs in the groups KILT with Bob Bellerue, Mesa Ritual with William Fowler Collins, Endlings with John Dieterich, and collaborations with Laura Ortman and Igor Cavalera. In 2016, he was commissioned by Kronos Quartet to compose a work for their Fifty For The Future project.

Chacon serves as Composer-in-Residence with the Native American Composers Apprenticeship Project. In 2012, he was awarded a Creative Capital Visual Arts grant. In 2014, he was honored with a Native Arts and Cultures Foundation National Artist Fellowship in Music. In 2018, Chacon was awarded the Berlin Prize by the American Academy in Berlin.

In 2022, Chacon became the first Native American to win the Pulitzer Prize for Music, which he received for his composition Voiceless Mass.

== Music and visual art ==
One of Chacon's well-known music piece, Voiceless Mass, won a Pulitzer Prize for Music. Being the first Native American to win a Pulitzer Prize, this piece was commissioned by WI Conference of the United Church of Christ, Plymouth Church UCC and Present Music. At first, he turned down the offer but soon reconsidered after realizing the space the music would be performed at. The themes that surround the Voiceless Mass was constructed carefully but intentionally with the performance being held at a Catholic Church where in previous years had mistreated and silenced them. Chacon has underlining themes of Indigenous culture as well as history that relates to the United States to further enhance his work.

Aside from being a composer, he's also known for creating works of art, a prominent example would the Storm Pattern. This piece carries Navajo weaving style while incorporating different symbols such as lightening bolts, arrows, digital audio. Chacon combines different elements like flying drones and the sounds of transmission from broadcast in his area.

== Postcommodity ==
Chacon was a member of the Native American art collective, Postcommodity, with whom he has developed multimedia installations which have been exhibited internationally. Other members include Cristóbal Martínez, Kade L. Twist, Steven Yazzie and Nathan Young. In 2017, as part of Postcommodity, Chacon created the multimedia project, ...in memoriam, in Edmonton in 2017, curated by Ociciwan Contemporary Art Collective.

== Personal life ==
Chacon lives in Albuquerque, New Mexico, and is married to Candice Hopkins, a Tagish curator. His sister Nani Chacon is a muralist.

== Awards and honors ==
Chacon has received numerous awards and honors for his work, including the 2022 Pulitzer Prize for Music, an American Academy in Berlin Prize (music composition), a Creative Capital award (visual arts), a United States Artists fellowship (music), a Joan Mitchell Foundation fellowship, a Native Arts and Cultures Foundation artist fellowship, among others. Chacon received the inaugural Mellon Foundation Artist-in-Residence fellowship for the Colorado Springs Fine Arts Center at Colorado College. In October 2023, Chacon was named a MacArthur Fellow.

== Partial discography ==
- Voiceless Mass (with Present Music and Ariadne Greif) (New World Records, 2025)
- Inhale/Exhale (w/ Carlos Santistevan and Tatsuya Nakatani) (Other Minds Records, 2022)
- An Anthology of Chants Operations (Ouidah, 2020)
- Horse Notations (Cimiotti Recordings, 2020)
- Crisalide Fossile (w/ OvO) (Bronson, 2016)
- Your New Age Dream Contains More Blood Than You Can Imagine 12"LP (w/ Postcommodity) (Anarchymoon, 2011)
- Kitchen Sorcery (w/ Bob Bellerue) (Prison Tatt Records, 2011)
- At the Point Where the Rivers Crossed, We Drew Our Knives 12"LP (Anarchymoon, 2010)
- Black Streaked Hum (Lightning Speak/Featherspines, 2009)
- Overheard Songs (Innova, 2006)
- The Incredible 17000 km Split (split w/ Torturing Nurse) (8K Mob, 2006)
- Jesus Was a Wino (w/ Jeff Gburek) (Herbal Records, 2005)
- Still/life (Sicksicksick, 2004)
- Meet the Beatless (Sicksicksick, 2003)

== Publications ==
- For Zitkála-Šá Toronto: Art Metropole; ISBN 978-1-989010-16-7 Los Angeles: New Documents; ISBN 978-1-953441-09-6. 2022.
- OEI #98–99: Aural Poetics Stockholm: OEI. 2023.
