= Uirapuru =

Uirapuru may refer to:

- Uirapuru or musician wren, a South American bird
- Uirapuru, Goiás, a municipality in the state of Goiás, Brazil
- Uirapuru (Villa-Lobos), an orchestral piece composed by Heitor Villa-Lobos
- Brasinca Uirapuru, a Brazilian automobile made in the 1960s
- Aerotec Uirapuru, a Brazilian military aircraft of the 1960s and 1970s

== See also ==
- Uyrapuru
