= Leamon =

Leamon is a surname and a masculine given name. Notable people with the name include:

== Surname ==
- David L. Leamon (1939–2018), American librarian
- Fred Leamon (1919–1981), American football player
- John Leamon (1804–1866), English-born Canadian merchant and politician

== Given name ==
- Leamon Green (born 1959), American visual artist
- Leamon Hall (born 1955), American football player
- Leamon Hunt (1927–1984), American diplomat
- Leamon Johnson (1916–death date unknown), American baseball player
- Leamon King (1936–2001), American athlete
