= Postcommodity =

Southwest Native American Artist collective

Postcommodity, a Southwest Native American interdisciplinary artist collective, was founded in 2007 by Kade Twist, Steven Yazzie, and Nathan Young. Their name refers to the "commodity era" of Native American art trading in the late 1800s and 1900s, with the "post" being in reference to their modern take on traditional Native art forms.

Their current members include Kade Twist (Cherokee Nation) and Cristobal Martinez (Mestizo). Former members are Raven Chacon (2009–2018), Steve Yazzie (2007–2010) and Nathan Young (2007–2015).

== Art style ==
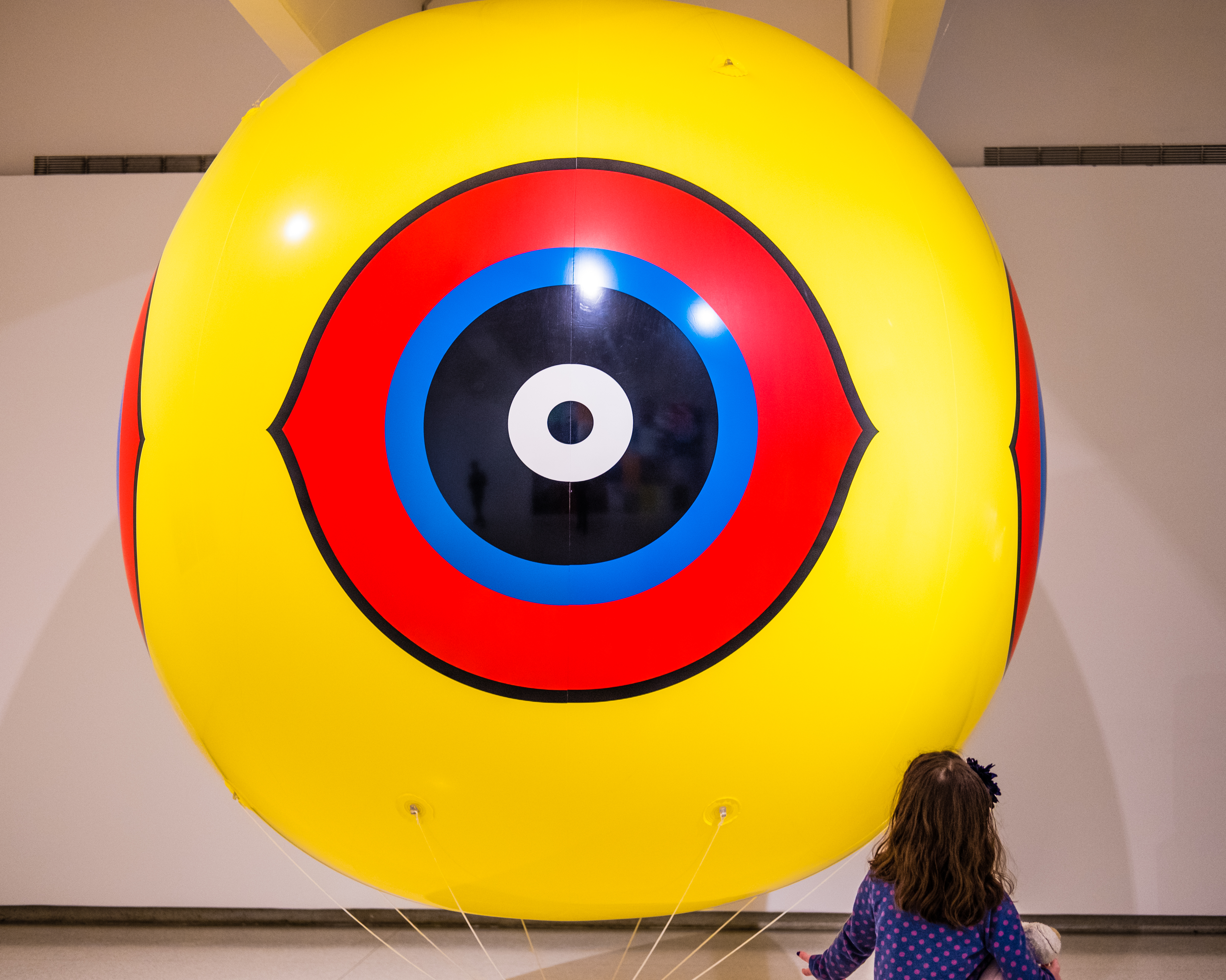
A scare-eye bird repellent balloon made by Postcommodity members Raven Chacon, Cristóbal Martínez, and Kade L. Twist, 2015, Art Institute of Chicago

Postcommodity makes use of modern technology (sound, video, etc.) in a way that goes against what would be considered as traditional Native American "Commodity Art" or folk craft. Much of this work has been considered as Asmr. Recently, they have been incorporating their work into architecture, such as adding speakers to pre-existing buildings, or creating their own purpose-built structures.

Another recurring theme in their art is the use of Bird scarer balloons, which contain elements of Native American colors and iconography. Their context for using these balloons is to "function as an intervention repelling the manifestations of the Western worldview and imagination."

In addition to visual art and ASMR, Postcommodity has released three music albums as LP records.

== Artworks ==
=== 2008 ===
- Repellent Eye Over Phoenix

=== 2009 ===
- Worldview Manipulation Therapy
- Do You Remember When?
- Dead River

=== 2010 ===
- My Blood is in the Water
- If History Moves At the Speed of its Weapons, Then the Shape of the Arrow is Changing
- It's My Second Home, But I Have a Very Spiritual Connection With This Place

=== 2011 ===
- Gallup Motel Butchering
- The Night is Filled With the Harmonics of Suburban Dreams
- Radiophonic Territory (Nocturne)
- A More Just, Verdant and Harmonious Resolution
- Mother, Teacher, Destroyer
- Repellent Eye (Winnipeg)

=== 2012 ===
- With Salvage and Knife Tongue

=== 2013 ===
- Game Remains (Ongoing)

=== 2014 ===
- People of Good Will (2014–2016)

=== 2015 ===
- Repellent Fence / Valla Repelente (US/Mexico Borderlands)
- Pollination

=== 2016 ===
- A Very Long Line

=== 2017 ===
- In Memorium
- Blind / Curtain
- The Ears Between Worlds are Always Speaking
- Coyotaje

=== 2018 ===
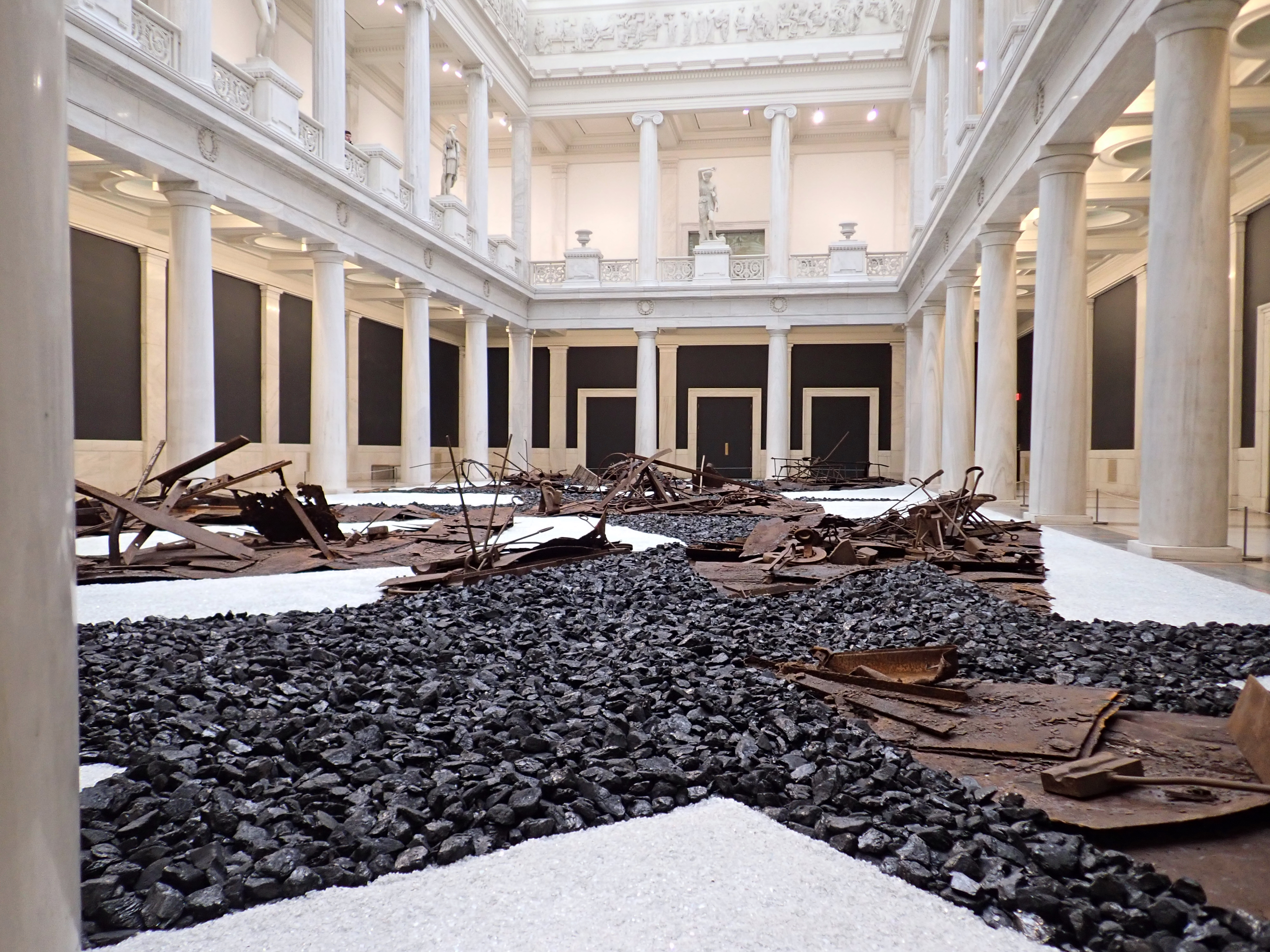
From Smoke and Tangled Waters We Carried Fire Home by Postcommodity

- From Smoke and Tangled Waters We Carried Fire Home

=== 2019 ===
- The Point of Final Collapse
- With Each Incentive
- It Exists in Many Forms

=== 2020 ===
- Some Reach While Others Clap
- Let Us Pray for the Water Between Us

== Music ==
=== 2007 ===
- Postcommodity + Magor

=== 2011 ===
- The Contour 2011 Sound + Vision LP: Piles of Cougar Pelts (recorded 2001–2011)
- Your New Age Dream Contains More Blood Than You Imagine

=== 2015 ===
- We Lost Half the Forest and the Rest Will Burn This Summer

== Books ==
=== 2010 ===
- Postcommodity + Magor, Postcommodity Publications (PCP)

== Exhibitions ==
=== 2007 ===
- 4+4+4 Days in Motion Festival, Prague, Czech Republic
- Intersections, Institute Slavonice, Center For the Future, Slavonice, Czech Republic

=== 2009 ===
- Martha and Mary Street Fair, Arizona State University Art Museum Happening
- Native Confluence: Sustaining Cultures, Arizona State University Art Museum
- Worldview Manipulation Therapy, Ice House, Phoenix, AZ

=== 2010 ===
- Muorrajurdagat, The National Museum of Art, Architecture and Design, Oslo Norway
- It Wasn't the Dream of Golden Cities, Museum of Contemporary Native Arts, Santa Fe, NM

=== 2011 ===
- Here, Pennsylvania Academy of Fine Art Museum, Philadelphia, PA
- Nuit Blanche, Toronto, Canada.
- Contour 2011, 5th Bienniel of Sound and Image, Mechelen, Belgium.
- Half Life: Patterns of Change, Santa Fe Art Institute, Santa Fe, NM
- Close Encounters, Plug In Institute of Contemporary Art, Winnipeg, Canada
- The Night is Filled With the Harmonics of Suburban Dreams, Lawrence Arts Center, Lawrence, KS

=== 2012 ===
- 18th Biennale of Sydney, Sydney, Australia
- Time Lapse / March 2012, Site Santa Fe, Santa Fe, New Mexico
- Adelaide International 2012: Restless, Adelaide, Australia

=== 2013 ===
- It's My Second Home, But I Have a Very Spiritual Connection With This Place, Headlands Center for the Arts, Sausalito, CA

=== 2014 ===
- Boundary//Battle, Redline, Denver, CO
- Free State Festival, Lawerence Art Center, Lawerence, KS

=== 2015 ===
- Ende Tymes Festival of Noise and Liberation, Knockdown Center, Brooklyn, NY
- Image Festival, A Non-Place in A Space, A Space Gallery, Toronto, ON
- You Are On Indian Land, Radiator Gallery, New York, NY
- Repellent Fence, US/Mexican Border, Douglas, AZ, U.S., Agua Prieta, Sonora, Mex.
- The Advice Seekers Want To Be Told Their Right, Denver Art Museum, Denver, CO
- Gallup Motel Butchering, CentralTrak Gallery, University of Texas, Dallas, TX
- Pollination, SouthwestNET: Postcommodity, Scottsdale Museum of Contemporary Art, Scottsdale, AZ

=== 2016 ===
- Screens and Thresholds, Presentation House Gallery, North Vancouver, BC
- Visions Into Infinite Archives, SOMArts, San Francisco, CA
- A Very Long Line, Center for Contemporary Art, Santa Fe, NM
- People of Good Will, Musagetes Foundation, Guelph, Canada

=== 2017 ===
- In Around Beyond, San Francisco Art Institute, San Francisco, CA
- I am you, you are too, Walker Art Center, Minneopolis, MN
- Toronto International Film Festival, Toronto, ON
- documenta14, Kassel, DE
- documenta14, Athens, GR
- 2017 Whitney Biennial, Whitney Museum of American Art, New York, NY
- Resistance After Nature, Haverford Cantor Fitzgerald Gallery, Haverford, PA
- Land Art - Broken Ground New Beginnings, Florida State University Museum of Fine Arts, Tallahassee, FL
- A Very Long Line, Esker Foundation, Calgary, Canada
- Coyotaje, Art in General, New York, NY

=== 2018 ===
- 57th Carnegie International, 2018, Carnegie Museum of Art, Pittsburgh, PA
- Nature's Nation: American Art and Environment, Princeton Art Museum, Princeton, NJ
- Califas: Art of the US-Mexico Borderlands, Richmond Art Center, Richmond, CA
- Hyperobjects, Ballroom Marfa, Marfa, TX
- Coyotaje, Art Gallery of York University, Toronto, Canada

=== 2019 ===
- how the light gets in, 2019, Johnson Museum of Art, Cornell University, Ithaca, NY
- Desert X, 2019, Coachella Valley, CA
- Some Reach While Others Clap, LAXArt, Los Angeles, CA
- The Point of Final Collapse, San Francisco Art Institute, San Francisco, CA
- With Each Incentive, Art Institute of Chicago, Chicago, IL

== Fellowships, Awards, and Grants ==
=== 2007 ===
- Telluride Institute Fellowship for a residency at the Center for the Future in the Czech Republic.

=== 2008 ===
- Common Ground Grant, First Nations Composers Imitative, American Composers Forum

=== 2009 ===
- Artist Project Grant, Arizona Commission on the Arts.

=== 2010 ===
- Joan Mitchell Foundation Painters and Sculptors Grant.
- Harpo Foundation Grant.
- National Museum of the American Indian, Expressive Arts Grant.
- Elly Kay Fund Award for excellence in contemporary art.

=== 2012 ===
- Creative Capital Artist Grant.

=== 2013 ===
- Art Matters Grant.

=== 2014 ===
- Native Arts and Cultures Foundation Grant.

=== 2017 ===
- Art of Change Fellowship, Ford Foundation.
- USArtist International Grant, Mid Atlantic Art Foundation.

=== 2018 ===
- Fine Prize, The Fine Foundation.

=== 2019 ===
- The Harker Fund of The San Francisco Foundation.
