= Nanibah Chacon =

Artist (b. 1980)

- Born: June 26, 1980 (age 46); Gallup, New Mexico
- Website: www.nanibahchacon.com

Nanibah "Nani" Chacon (born 1980) is a Diné and Chicana painter, muralist, and art educator. Her work has been installed at the IAIA Museum of Contemporary Native Arts in Santa Fe, the Navajo Nation Museum in Window Rock, the ISEA International Arts and Technology Symposium, Old Town Lansing, and in the "Que Chola" Exhibition at the National Hispanic Cultural Center in Albuquerque, among other venues.

== Early life ==
Chacon was born in Gallup, New Mexico and raised in Chinle, Arizona and Albuquerque, New Mexico.

== Art practice ==
At the age of 15, Chacon first became involved in street art and graffiti. After 10 years of producing street art, she began to make painted mural art. She then became part of the Honor the Treaties collective that produce work about Native peoples' rights and land issues.

== Art career ==
Chacon's mural, She Taught Us to Weave, was commissioned by the City of Albuquerque for the ISEA International Arts and Technology Symposium in 2012. This mural is part of the Wells Park Rail Corridor Mural Project and contains a low-power radio transmitter. The radio device transmits the words, Hozho naahaslii, a Navajo phrase that connotes "the instrinsic value of living beautifully."

In 2013, her mural, Against The Storm She Gathers Her Thoughts, became the first mural installation in the Navajo Nation Museum as a part of the Ch'ikééh Baa Hózhǫ exhibit. In conjunction with this exhibit, her work Na iiz Nah, was selected for inclusion in the indigenous art zine, Ziindi. Also in 2013, Chacon's work Manifestations of Glittering World was included in the Stands With A Fist: Contemporary Native Women Artists exhibit at the Museum of Contemporary Native Arts in Santa Fe, New Mexico.

Chacon was included in the 19th Young Latino Artists Exhibition, entitled Y, Que? (And What!), at the Mexic-Arte Museum in Austin, Texas, which presented multimedia artworks from emerging Latinx artists, under the age of 35, that explored themes of race, class, gender, sexuality, and cultural identity. The same year, she was the featured artist speaker at the Northern New Mexico College conference Mapping Geographies of Self: Woman as First Environment.

In 2015, Chacon was the lead artist on the largest mural in Albuquerque, Resilience. For this mural, she partnered with the nonprofit youth arts organization, Working Classroom, and collaborated with a number of students from Albuquerque's Washington Middle School. That year, she also completed a mural on a wall of the Municipal Arts Gallery in Izhevsk, Russia.

Chacon's work was featured in the Code Mixing: From Concrete to Canvas Exhibition at Movimiento de Arte y Cultura Latino Americana (MACLA) in San Jose, California in 2016. In 2017, she designed and installed the work Sing Our Rivers Red, an installation honoring over 1,000 Indigenous Canadian women and girls who have been reported missing or killed since 1980, at the CHAC Gallery as a part of Denver, Colorado's Sing Our Rivers Red March.

In the summer of 2017, Chacon and youth from Española completed the mural The River Flows Through It at the Española Valley Fiber Arts Center. The mural represents the diverse textile traditions of Northern New Mexico and includes elements that represent Navajo, Pueblo, and Spanish fiber art techniques.

In fall 2018, Chacon participated in the Michigan State University Womxn of Color Initiative Artist-in-Residence, a program which creates space for students to engage with women of color. As Estrella Torrez, a professor and one of the organizers of the Womxn of Color Initiative, said, "Nanibah Chacón is one of the most significant muralists working today. In addition to creating exceptionally beautiful works of art, her paintings address complex and poignant topics by foregrounding the stories of Indigenous womxn and Indigenous knowledges."

She has also been a visiting artist at Washington State University, where she created a mural installation.

== Personal ==
Chacon lives in Albuquerque with her son. Her brother, Raven Chacon, is a celebrated sound artist.
