= Voiceless Mass =

Winner of the 2022 Pulitzer Prize for Music

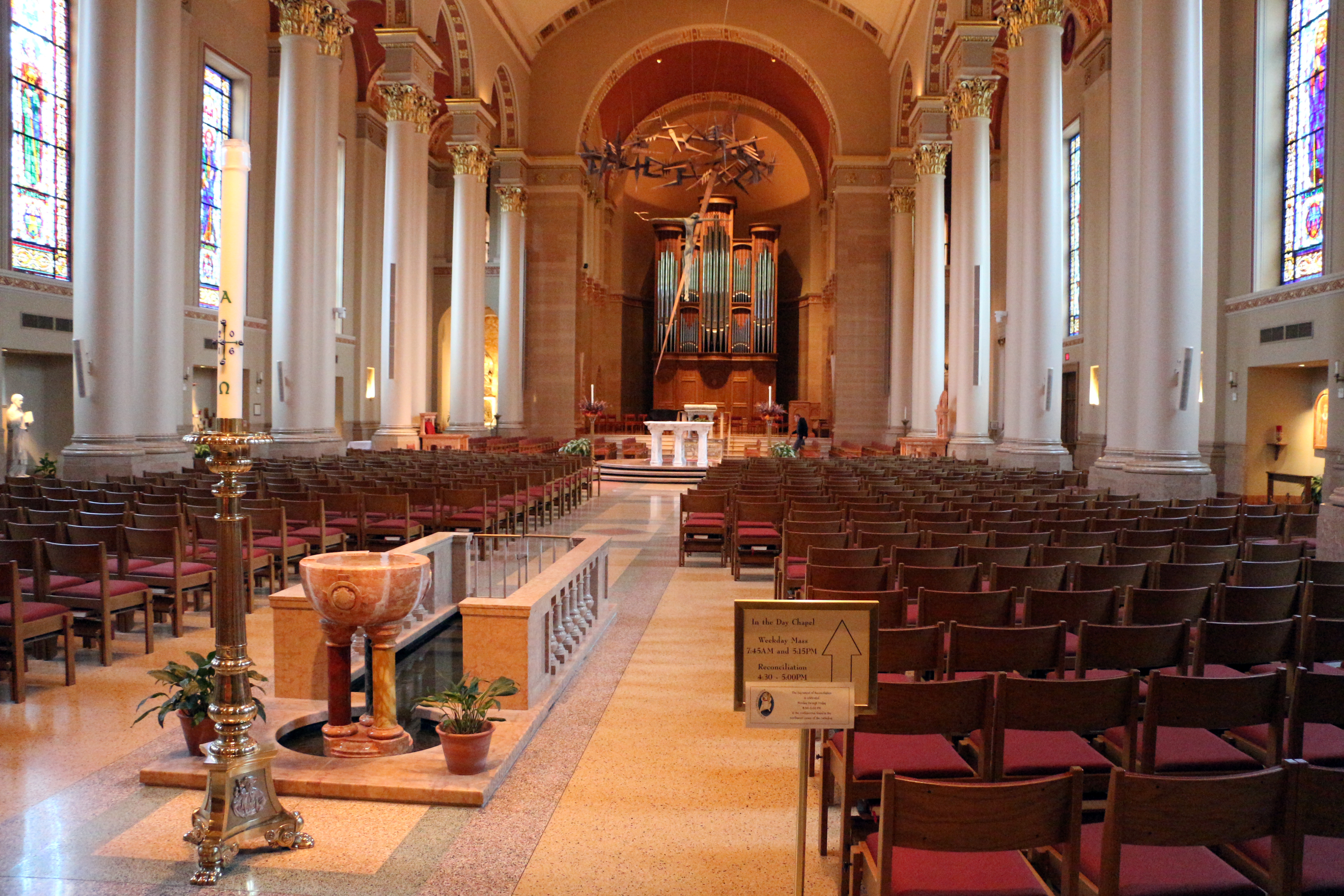
Interior of the Cathedral of St. John the Evangelist (Milwaukee); pipe organ visible at back.

Voiceless Mass by Diné-American composer Raven Chacon was the winner of the 2022 Pulitzer Prize for Music. The work was written specifically for the pipe organ at the Cathedral of St. John the Evangelist (Milwaukee) and it premiered at the cathedral on November 21, 2021.

== Composition ==
The work is scored for the organ and flute, clarinet, bass clarinet, two percussionists, strings and sine tones.
