= Topeka & Shawnee County Public Library =

Public library in Topeka, Kansas

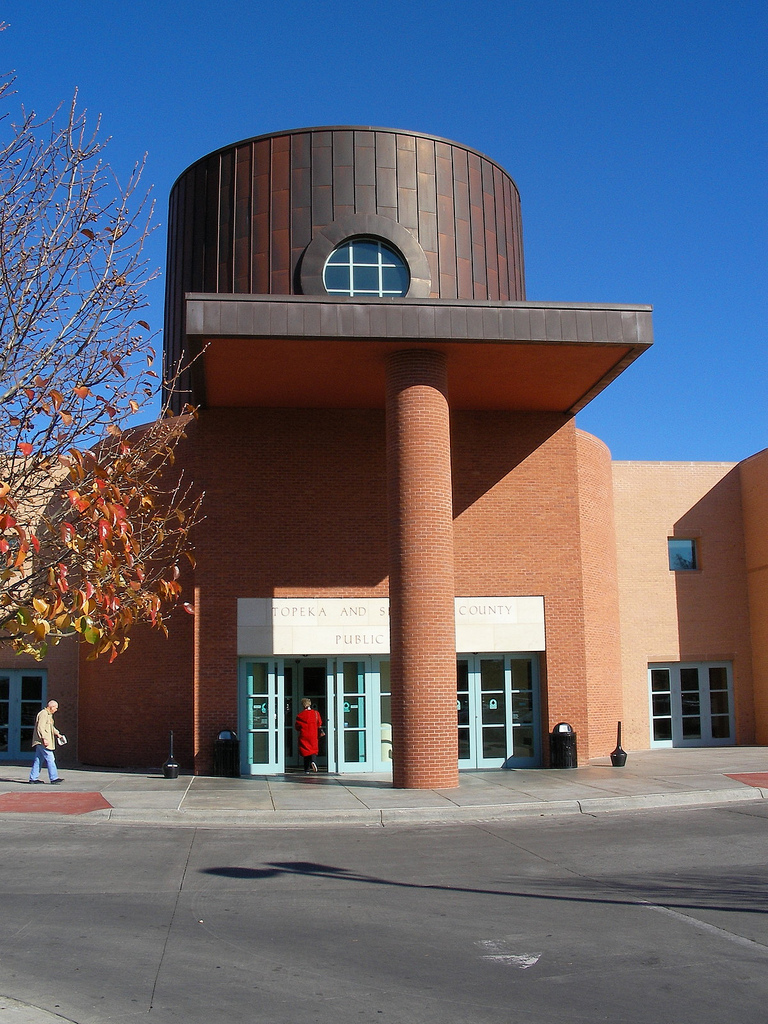
- 39°03′03″N 95°41′47″W
- Location: 1515 SW 10th Ave. Topeka, Kansas
- Type: Public
- Established: 1870
- Branches: 1

Collection
- Size: 1,487,768 (physical & digital 2021)

Access and use
- Circulation: 1,930,108 (2017)

Other information
- Budget: $15,650,234
- Director: Marie Pyko (CEO)
- Employees: 208
- Website: tscpl.org

The Topeka & Shawnee County Public Library is a public library located in Topeka, Kansas, United States. It serves all of Shawnee County, Kansas with the exception of the Rossville, Kansas and Silver Lake, Kansas townships. The Topeka & Shawnee County Public Library is a municipal taxing district authorized by Kansas law. It is governed by a board of trustees consisting of ten members.

The library offers many services to the public including senior/homebound delivery, work and home delivery, bookmobile services, curbside pickup, public computers, meeting rooms, extensive programming, the Alice C. Sabatini Gallery and the Millennium Cafe.

== History ==
The Topeka & Shawnee County Public Library was founded in 1870 when the Ladies' Library Association met to start a library. It was not until March 1871 that the doors of the library finally opened in the Keith & Meyers Dry Goods Store. In 1883, the library opened its first permanent building. Edward Wilder, Secretary-Treasurer of the Atchison, Topeka and Santa Fe Railway and President of the Library Board, convinced the Union Pacific Railroad and the AT&SFRR to jointly fund a building for the library on the State House grounds.

In 1953, the library opened its new building at the corner of 10th and Washburn. In 1970, the library expanded at its current location in celebration of its centennial. In 1996, voters approved a $23 million expansion project. Michael Graves was retained by the architectural firm to be the design architect. A groundbreaking took place in 1998 for the expansion. The library opened its doors on January 12, 2002.

Former directors

The current chief executive officer is Marie Pyko. Former directors include Horace Moses, James Marvin, David L. Leamon and Gina Millsap. The library's auditorium is named after James Marvin, and the library's Circulation Lobby is named after David Leamon.

Controversies

In February 2009, the library board voted to restrict minors from accessing four sexually themed books. After public protest and controversy over the decision, the library board voted in April 2009 to return the books to the shelves without restriction.

== Board of trustees ==
The Board of Trustees is composed of three county appointees and seven city appointees.
