= Laura Ortman =

American musician

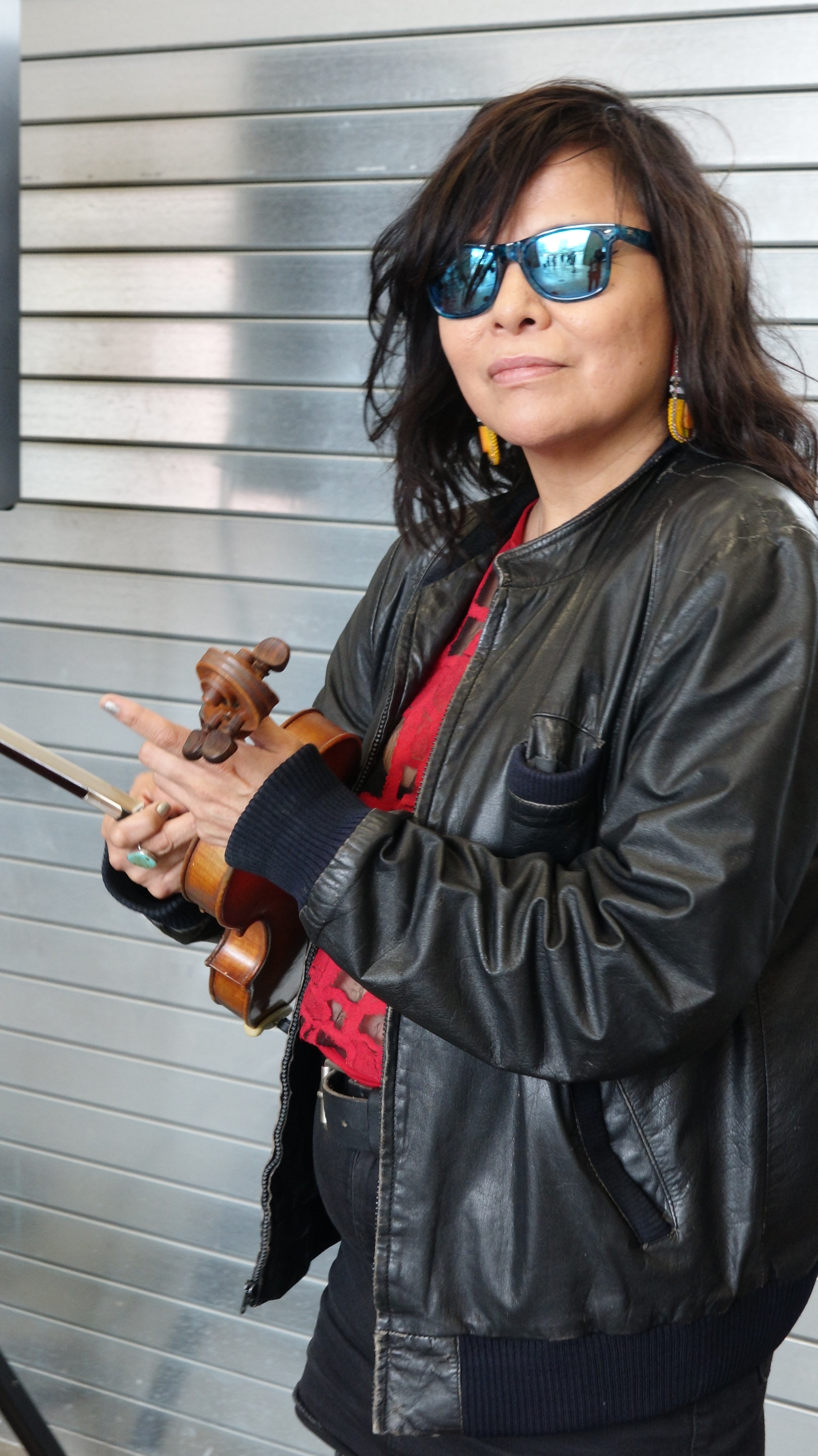
- Laura Ortman gets ready to perform at an exhibit opening in Brooklyn in 2025
- Born: July 17, 1973 (age 52); Whiteriver, Arizona, United States
- Education: University of Kansas
- Known for: Experimental music
- Website: Laura Ortman's webpage

Laura Ortman is an American musician and artist from Whiteriver, Arizona who lives in Brooklyn, New York City.

== Early life and education ==
Ortman was born in Whiteriver, Arizona, United States. Ortman was adopted at birth and grew up in Alton, Illinois. Ortman grew up in a musical family. Her mother, Terri Ortman was a pianist who managed a youth orchestra for 20 years. Her sister played the flute and harp, her brother played the french horn. Her grandmother, Mrs. Hummer was a symphony violinist in Des Moines, Iowa Ortman describes her grandmother as influencing her taste in classical music introducing her to musicians such as Sibelius, Beethoven, Tchaikovsky, Brahms and Bartok. As a teen, Ortman was a part of the St. Louis Youth Symphony.

She is a White Mountain Apache. In 2001, Ortman reconnected with her birth family in Arizona. The timing was significant as it was one month prior to the 9/11 attack in New York, where Ortman was residing and it was also seven months prior to the death of Terri Ortman, her adopted mother.

Ortman has a Bachelor of Fine Arts from the University of Kansas, where she studied drawing, painting, sculpture and performance art.

In 1997, Ortman moved to New York City. After moving to New York she began doing improvisational music for modern dancers, soon attracting the attention of the New York Native community. While Ortman lives in busy Brooklyn, New York, she enjoys nature and walks in Prospect Park, as well as hiking and camping in upstate New York's Catskill Mountains.

== Career ==
Ortman is a solo performer and collaborative artist. Her practise includes recorded albums, live performances, film and artistic soundtracks. Ortman has collaborated with artists such as Nanobah Becker, Martin Bisi, Raven Chacon, Tony Conrad, Martha Colburn, Jeffery Gibson, Okkyung Lee, Caroline Monnet, and Jock Soto. Ortman plays Apache style violin, piano, electric guitar, keyboards, pedal steel guitar, and sings. She has produced field recordings.

=== Style ===
Ortman's practice has a strong connection to visual art, prior to moving to New York, Ortman states: “I used to try to create painting and installation work about being isolated, of being singular," she says. "Then I started making my own music for the installations, to fill them up. Then, at last, I decided that the sound was what was really moving me." She describes her music as "sculpting sound."

=== Bands ===
- In 2008, Ortman founded the Coast Orchestra, an all-Native American orchestral ensemble. It performed a live soundtrack to Edward Curtis’s film In the Land of the Head Hunters (1914). Curtis' film was the first silent feature film to star an all Native American cast.
- band called in Defense of Memory
- Stars Like Fleas
- The Dust Dive
- The Christian Nightmares Tribulation Band

=== Jerome Foundation Project ===
Laura Ortman received $20,000 in 2017 from the Jerome Foundation to create of a "collaborative collage" an Indigenous New York City Walking Soundtrack, that fused spoken word, song, din, movement, air, whispers and atmosphere, capturing a changing and personal Native American New York experience. She captured atmospheric recordings using the mobile recording unit she created.

== Exhibitions and performances ==
- 2019 Toronto Biennial of Art
- My Soul Remainer, video, 2019 Whitney Biennial
- Performer in Raven Chacon's "For Zitkála-Šá", 2022 Whitney Biennial
- From My Home to Yours: Caroline Monnet and Laura Ortman (2022), Montclair Art Museum
- "Transonic Homes" (2023), The Aldrich Contemporary Art Museum
- Laura Ortman: Wood that Sings (2024), Baltimore Art Museum
- 60th Venice Biennale (2024)

== Awards and grants ==
- 2017 Jerome Foundation Fellowship
- 2016 Art Matters Foundation Grant
- 2016 National Artist Fellowship Native Arts and Culture Foundation
- 2015 IAIA's Museum of Contemporary Native Arts Social Engagement Resident
- 2014–2015 Rauschenberg Foundation Residency
- FIRST NATIONS COMPOSERS INITIATIVE Common Ground Award Grant
