= Lawrence Public Library =

Library in Lawrence, Kansas, US

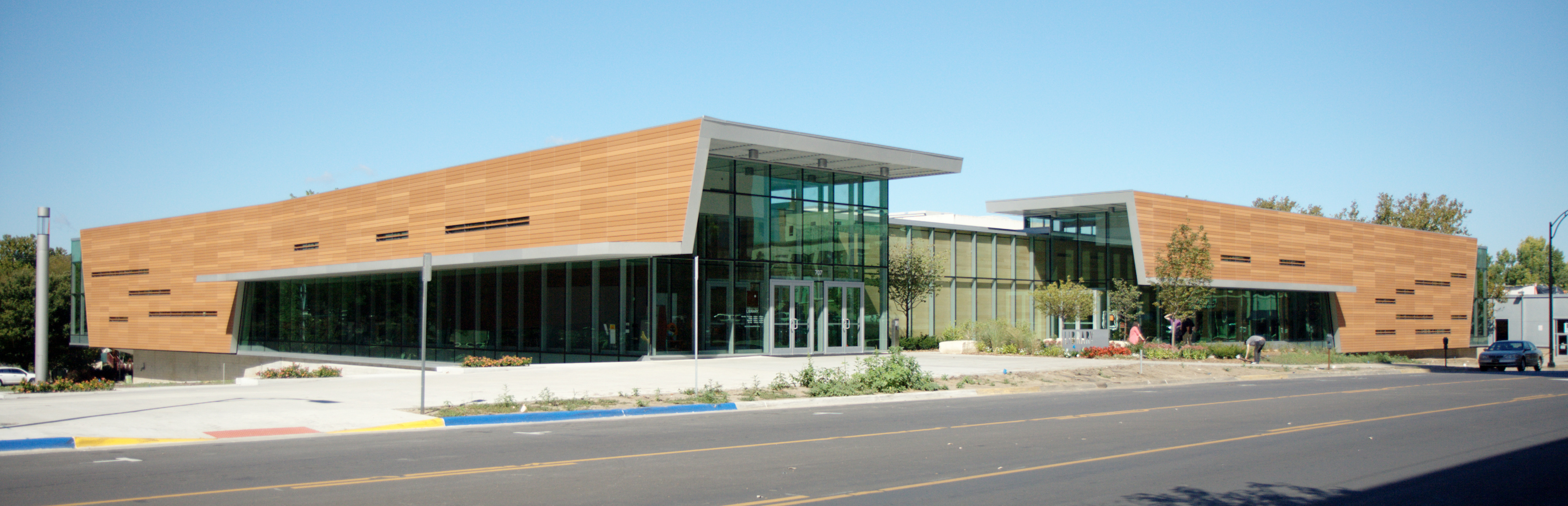
- Lawrence Public Library
- 38°58′14″N 95°14′15″W
- Location: 707 Vermont Street; Lawrence, Kansas 66044-2371, United States
- Type: Public
- Established: 1854 (Subscription); 1904 (Public)

Collection
- Size: 201,040 (2015)

Access and use
- Circulation: 1,367,223 (2018)
- Members: 68,089 (2018)

Other information
- Budget: 4,630,000 (2018)
- Director: Brad Allen
- Website: lplks.org

The Lawrence Public Library is a public library located in Lawrence, Kansas. It serves the City of Lawrence, and, through its membership in the Northeast Kansas Library System (NEKLS), all of the citizens of the NEKLS multi-county regional library system. The library was originally established as a subscription-based library in 1854, but changed to a free public library upon the donation of a new building by Andrew Carnegie in 1904. The Carnegie library was the main headquarters of the NEKLS and the main library in Lawrence until 1972 when a new modern library replaced it.

== History ==
=== 1800s ===
The City of Lawrence opened its first library one month after its own founding, in October 1854. Membership at first cost $1 per year with the option of a $25 lifetime membership. The founder of Lawrence, Amos Adams Lawrence, brought a flatboat load of books to bolster the library's collection in 1855.

In 1863 the library suffered the fate of many of the city's buildings and burned to the ground as William Quantrill attacked the city, in an event known as the Lawrence massacre. A new library was reorganized the year following out of the house of J. S. Boughton and monies were quickly raised for the construction of a new building. By 1866 a library association was created and a lease on a newly constructed building allowed the library collection a new home.

During the new library association's first two years 75 volumes were purchased with an additional 150 donated. The city took over control of the library in September 1871 and moved it into the Lawrence National Bank building where it occupied three rooms on the second floor.

=== 1900s ===
==== Carnegie Library ====
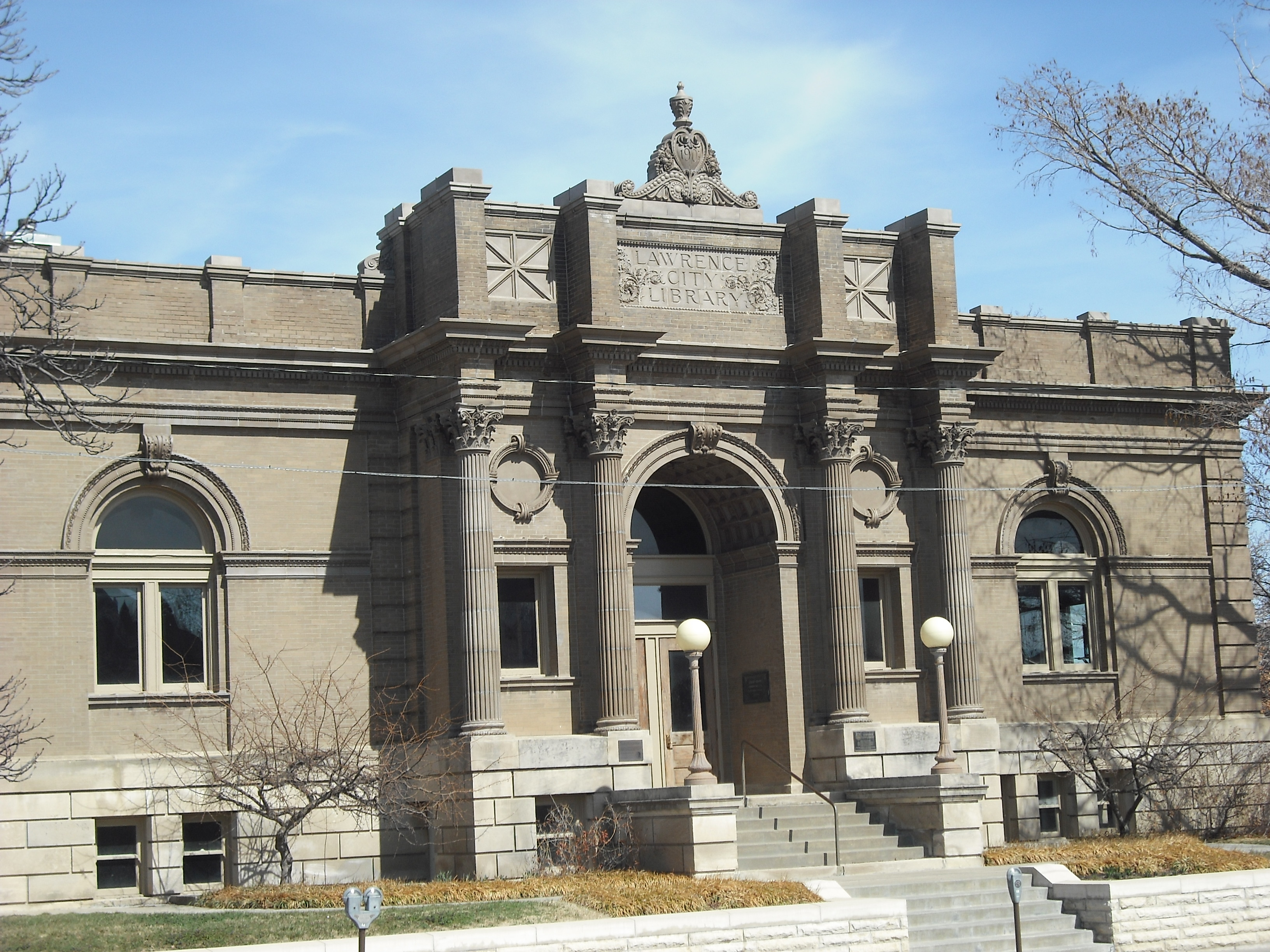
The original Carnegie Library

While the library was in a stage of renewed growth, its collection quickly outgrew its facilities. With 6,000 volumes there was not enough room to store all the books, and the $1 per year charge per resident was not ample enough to provide funding for a new building. One resident, Peter Emery, was interested in library science and petitioned philanthropist Andrew Carnegie for funds dedicated to the erection of a new library. Carnegie agreed to the request and donated $27,500 on the stipulation the city of Lawrence transform it into a free public library and dedicate $2,750 each year to its upkeep and maintenance. This deal was called to a vote in the town and was overwhelmingly accepted. The new building began construction and was dedicated during the week of the semi-centennial celebration of Lawrence. The library officially opened to the public on December 26, 1904.

==== Period of growth ====
After the completion of the Carnegie library, the Lawrence Public Library experienced decades of rapid growth. By 1922 interest from children increased at such a rate that a new room was added to the library for their own use. By 1936 40% of the city's population had a library card, and in the following year the building saw a renovation to increase the size of its storage stacks. More improvements were made in 1957 to modernize the building and incorporate more parking and air conditioning.

Under the Library Systems Law passed in 1965, public libraries were encouraged to cooperate with each other in making library systems to better serve their populations. Libraries which banded together also became eligible for additional state and federal monies from the Federal Library Services and Construction Act. Due to this, a new cooperative library was formed in 1966 consisting of 30 libraries across 14 counties in Kansas. The new library system was known as the Northeast Kansas Library System (NEKLS) and the headquarters was chosen as the Lawrence Public Library.

==== New building ====
Due to increasing space constraints in the Carnegie Library a proposal was made to allocate funds to construct a new building. To keep the history of the Carnegie Library alive the new building would be built in another location close by. In 1970 a citywide vote on a $1,575,000 bond passed with overwhelming success and the new library underwent construction. This building opened in August 1972, and the Carnegie building became the location for the Friends of the Library association. From 1975 through 2002, the Carnegie Library building was home to the Lawrence Arts Center, before being repurposed as an events space and visitors center for the Freedoms' Frontier National Heritage Area in 2011.

=== 2000s ===
On November 10, 2010 an $18 million budget was proposed by the Library Board of Trustees on the grounds that since its construction in 1972 the population served had more than doubled. This proposal was accepted by voters later that year and renovations took place over the following four years reaching completion in July 2014. During construction, the library was temporarily housed in the former Borders Books location at 700 New Hampshire Street.

Following the renovation, the Lawrence Public Library won the AIA/ALA Library Building Award in 2016. It was also rated 16th place of 50 in "50 Best Libraries in America" by Elle Decor.

== Image gallery ==
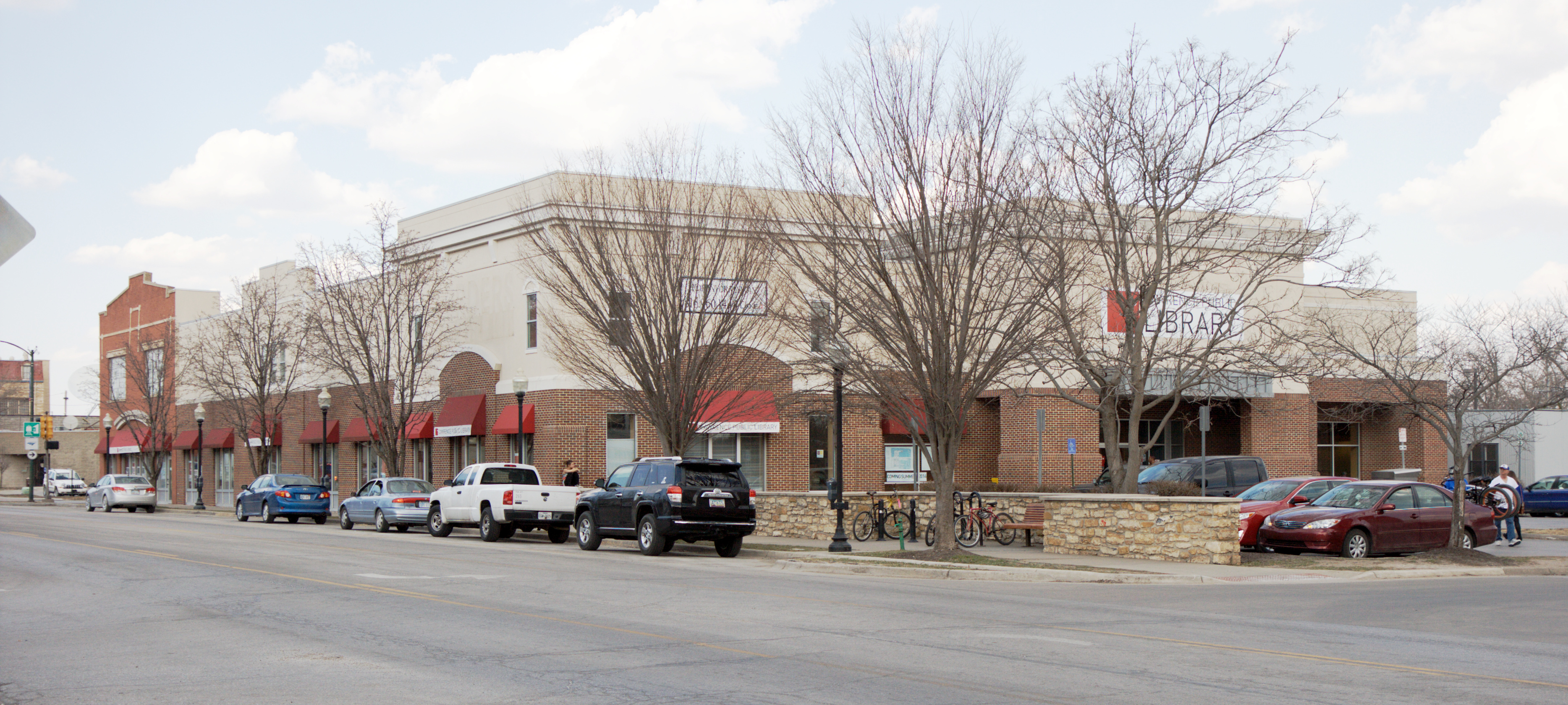
The temporary home of the library, from 2013 to July 2014

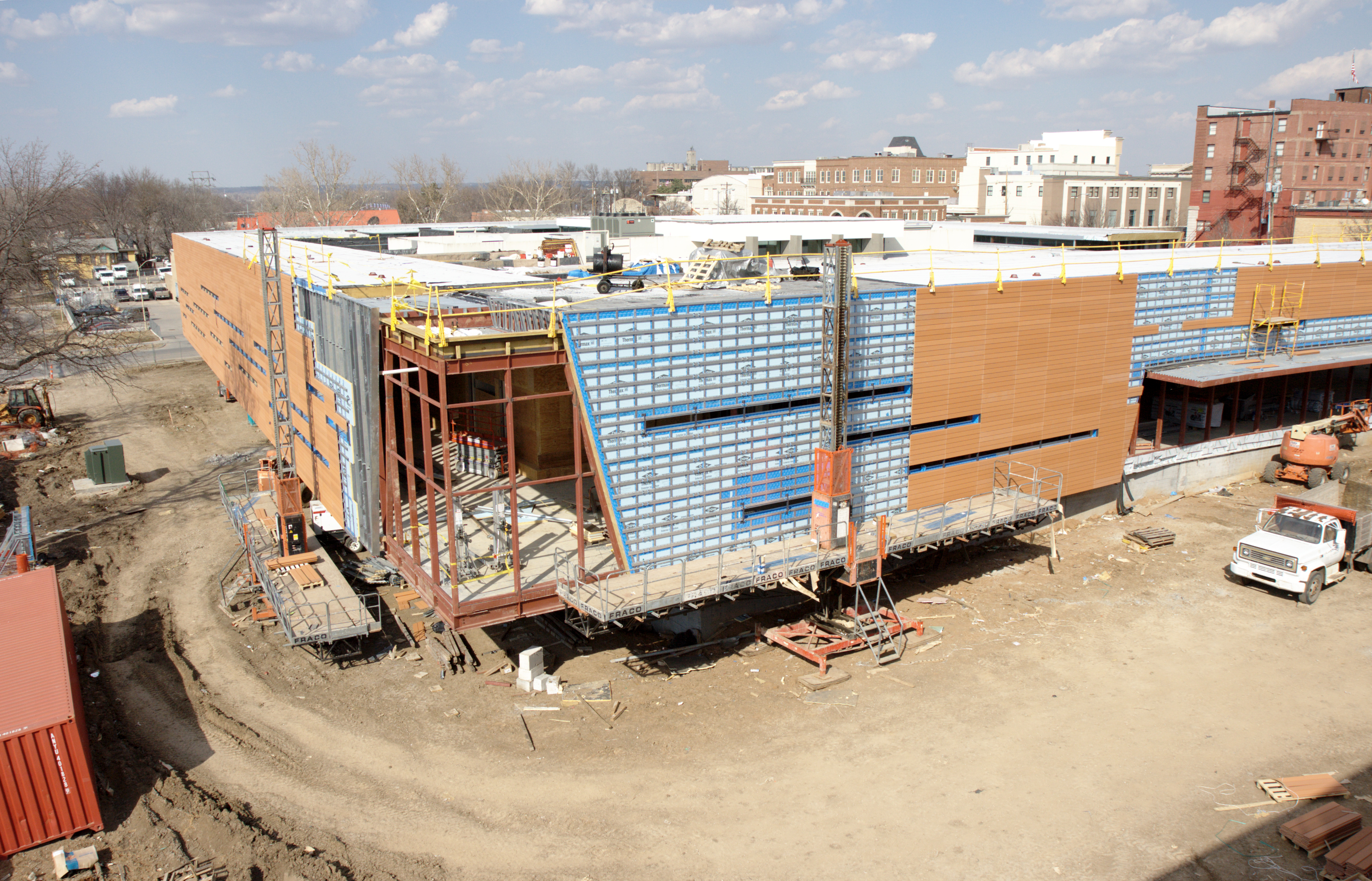
Construction as of March 2014, viewed from the southwest

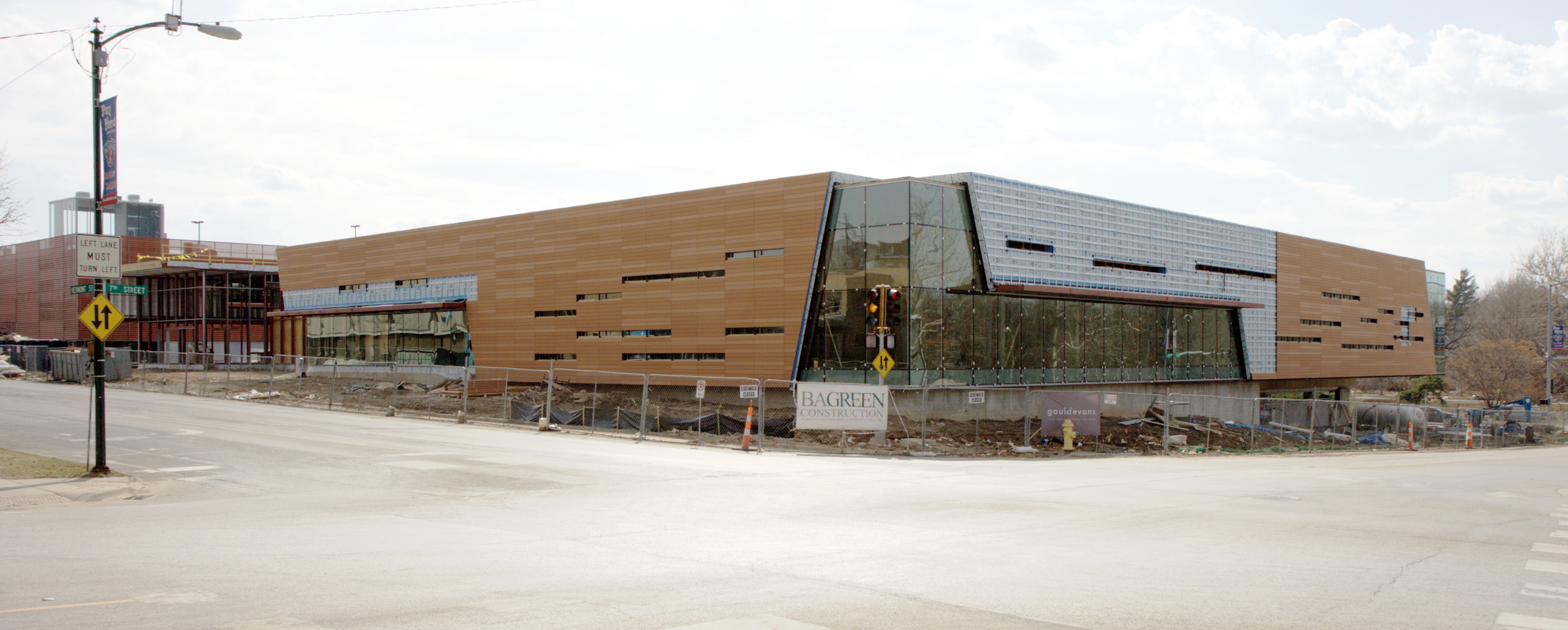
Construction as of March 2014, viewed from the northeast

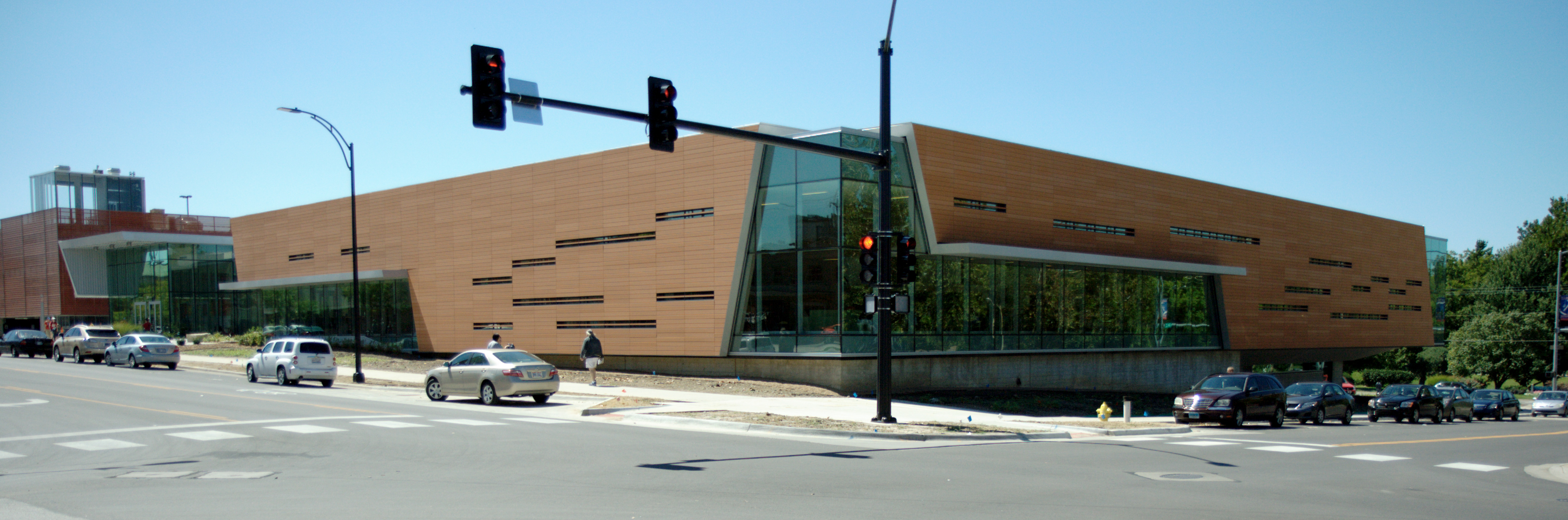
The completed library, viewed from the northeast

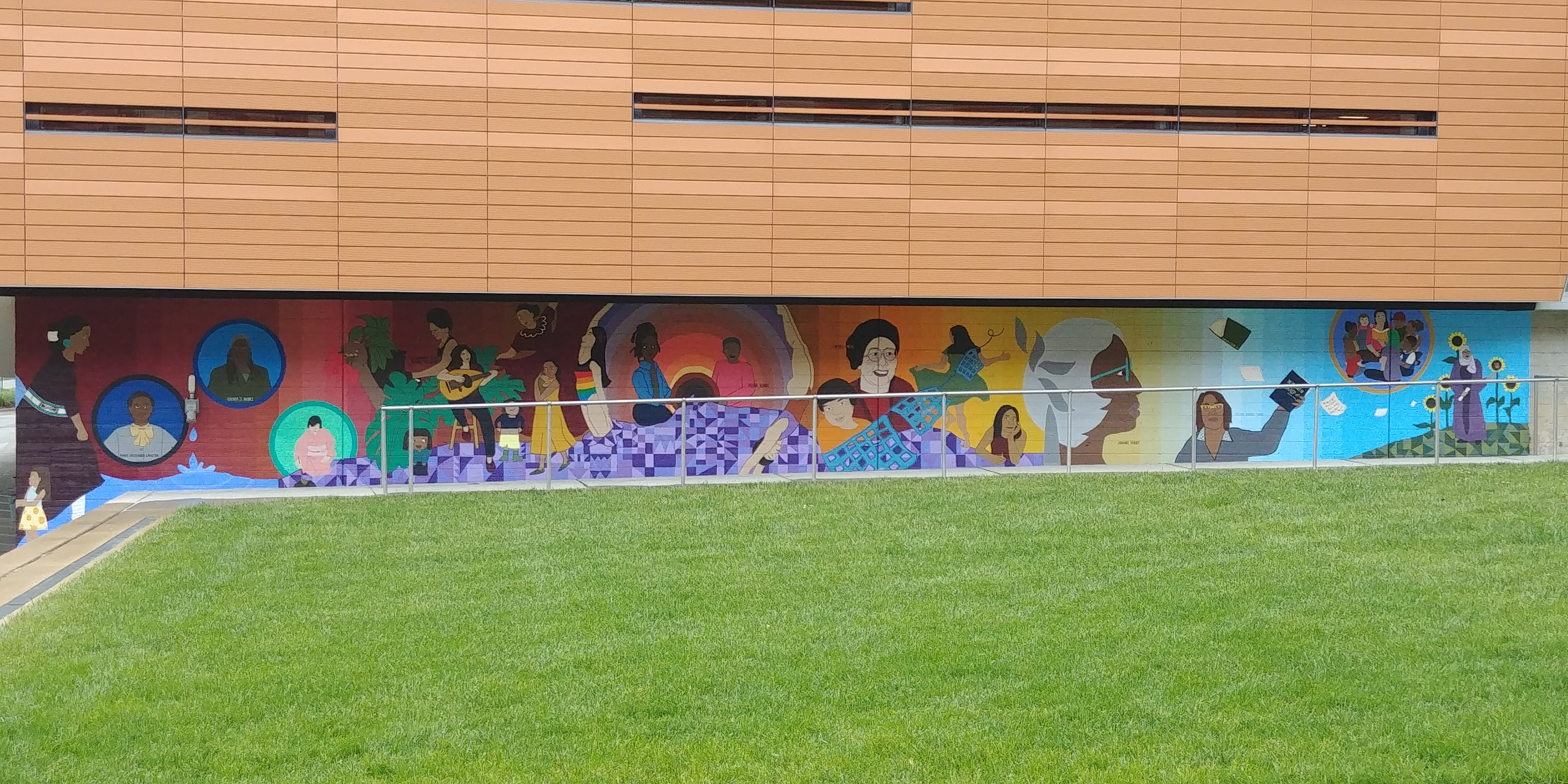
A mural on the side of the library.
