= Lawrence Arts Center =

Coordinates: 38°57′59″N 95°14′04″W

The Lawrence Arts Center is located in Lawrence, Kansas, United States. It is a regional hub for visual and performing arts, contemporary exhibitions, film, and lectures. These programs are strengthened by fully developed curricula in ballet and modern dance, theater performance, and visual arts that observe National Core standards. It employs over 120 teaching artists, and hosts entrepreneurship, professional development and artist-in-residencies for artists across disciplines. It enrolls 10,000 students annually, offers a robust financial aid program and greets over 200,000 visitors and audience members each year.

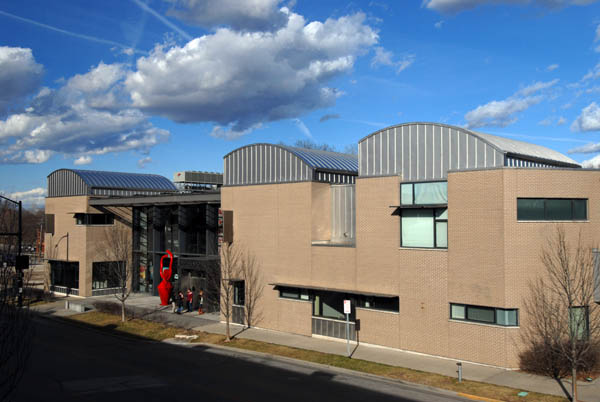
Lawrence Arts Center - Current location (2002-Present)

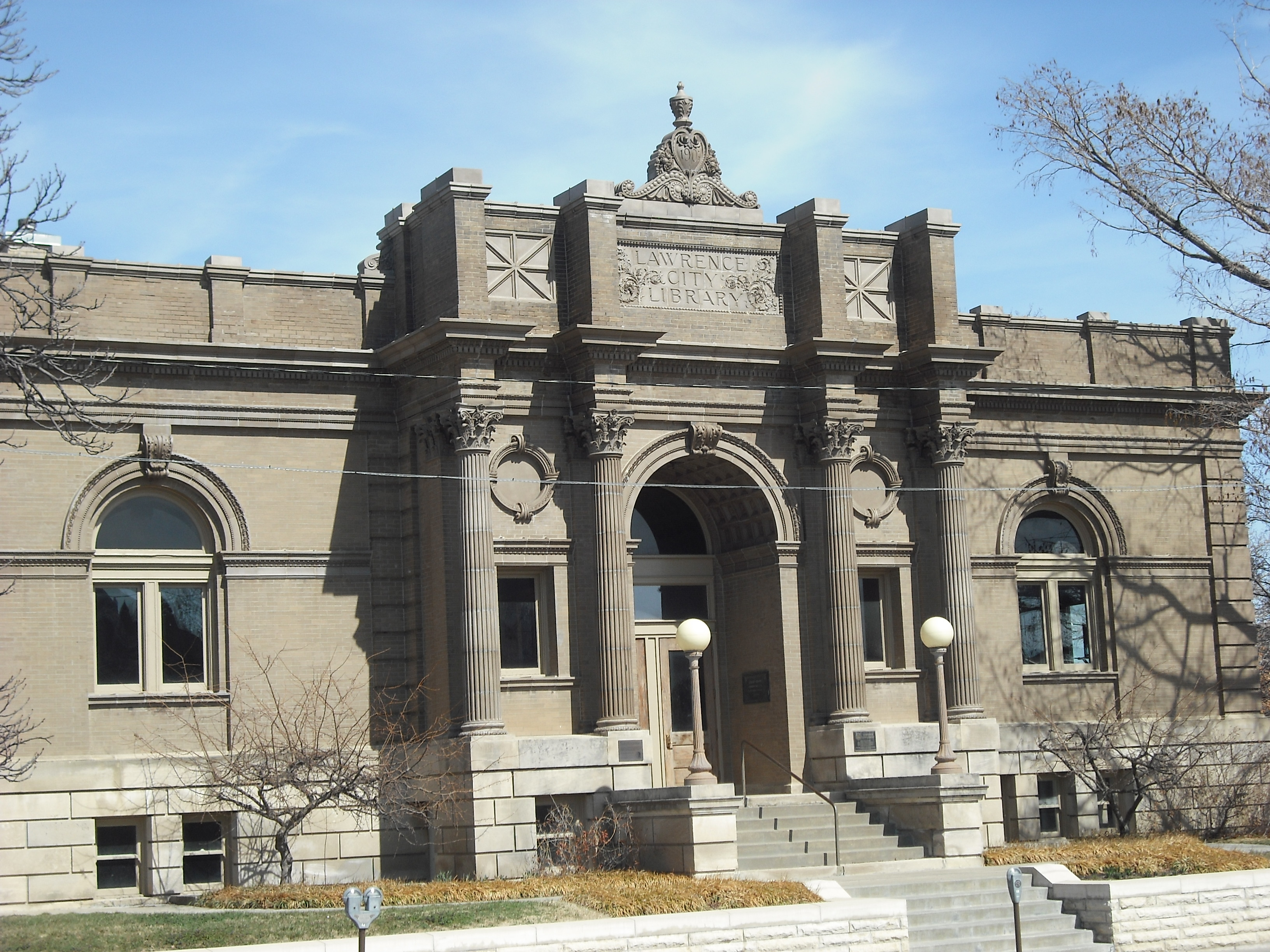
Carnegie Library - Former home of the Lawrence Arts Center (1975 - 2002)

== History ==
The Lawrence Arts Center was established in 1975 and was originally housed in the Carnegie Library building at 200 West 9th Street. In 2002, the Lawrence Arts Center Center opened a new facility featuring 40,000 square feet of programming spaces including: 3 exhibition galleries, a 300 seat main stage theater, a 100 seat Black Box Theatre, 2 dance studios, 2 arts-based early education classrooms, and 7 visual arts studios. The Lawrence Arts Center offers year-long residencies in printmaking and ceramics and short term project-based residencies in various mediums. Featured programs include Summer Youth Theatre, the Lawrence Dance Intensive, the Benefit Art Auction, the Ceramics Symposium, the Print Fair, and the annual Free State Festival - a celebration of film, music, art and ideas. Located 30 minutes from Kansas City, Lawrence is home to the University of Kansas and Haskell Indian Nations University.

The founder and first Executive Director was Ann Evans, who retired at the end of 2007. David L. Leamon acted as Executive Director from 2008-2009. Susan Tate, a former Humanities and English teacher at Lawrence High School, led the organization as the Chief Executive Officer from 2009 through 2016. Kimberly Williams was the Chief Executive Officer from 2016- 2017. In May 2018, Margaret Weisbrod Morris, the Lawrence Arts Center's Chief Program Officer, accepted the position of Chief Executive Officer.
