= David L. Leamon =

American library administrator (1939–2018)

David Lea Leamon
- Leamon in 2005
- Born: July 31, 1939
- Died: April 23, 2018 (aged 78); Lawrence, Kansas
- Occupation: Public library administrator

David Lee Leamon (July 31, 1939 - April 23, 2018) was a public library administrator from the United States.

== Education and early career ==
Leamon received his bachelor's degree with a double major in Fine Art and Theater from Central Missouri State University in Warrensburg, Missouri. He earned his Master of Library Science from Case Western University.

Leamon began his library career at Mid-Continent Public Library in the Kansas City, Missouri area. He next served at the Tulsa Public Library in Tulsa, Oklahoma. He then served as a regional director for the Seattle Public Library in Seattle, Washington.

== Later career ==
While director of the Jackson Public Library in Jackson, Michigan, Leamon oversaw the creation of the Jackson District Library, which combined the public libraries of Jackson, Brooklyn, Spring Arbor and Springport.

As director of the San Antonio Public Library in San Antonio, Texas from 1989–1992, Leamon worked closely with Ricardo Legorreta during the construction of the landmark main library. He also oversaw the Hertzberg Circus Museum.

Leamon finished his career at the Topeka & Shawnee County Public Library in Topeka, Kansas. During his time in Topeka, Leamon led the effort to create a new Library District. Leamon assisted in expanding the Library Foundation, including playing a major role in raising over $4 million in support of Library activities. He also oversaw the construction of the new main library which was designed by Michael Graves While at the Topeka and Shawnee County Public Library, Leamon was honored with the naming of the David L. Leamon Circulation Lobby

In addition to his work as a library director, Leamon was active in the art community in every city where he lived. In Topeka, he was the leading force behind the creation of the Aaron Douglas Mural Project.

On November 17, 2008, Leamon came out of retirement to take a job as the Executive Director of the Lawrence Arts Center, a job which he kept until July 28, 2009.
