= Steven Yazzie =

Native American artist from Colorado

Steven J. Yazzie
- Born: 1970 (age 55–56)
- Citizenship: Navajo Nation and U.S.
- Education: Arizona State University
- Occupation: visual artist
- Years active: 1990s–present
- Spouse: Eileen O'Connell Yazzie
- Website: yazziestudio.com

Steven J. Yazzie (born 1970) is a Native American artist, who is enrolled in the Navajo Nation and of Laguna Pueblo descent of his father's side. He creates video art and installation environments but described painting as his first and most important medium.

== Early life ==
Yazzie was born in Newport Beach, California, during 1970 and has three younger brothers. His parents divorced when he was four and less than a year later his mother married to a Navajo man. When he was six years old Yazzie's stepfather moved the family to an Arizona reservation in Black Mesa.

== Military service ==
Yazzie joined the U.S. Marine Corps and participated in the first Gulf War, in Desert Storm and Desert Shield. When he returned home, Yazzie discovered that his paternal grandfather had participated in World War II as a code-talker. His grandfather has inspired and been included in many pieces.

== Education ==
Yazzie completed his bachelor of fine arts degree in intermedia at Arizona State University. He graduated from the Herberger Institute for Design and the Arts in 2014, being named the outstanding graduate. He briefly studied at the Skowhegan School of Painting and Sculpture in Maine.

== Art career ==
Some projects Yazzie has headed include Digital Preserve, LLC and Postcommodity, the latter of which he helped found with Kade L. Twist (Cherokee Nation) and Nathan Young (Delaware/Pawnee/Kiowa/Cherokee). He has since left Postcommodity, which is now headed by Twist and Cristóbal Martínez. He also co-founded the Museum of Walking with Angela Ellsworth, located on the Arizona State University campus in the Tower Center Building.

=== Drawing and Driving ===
Drawing and Driving was a performance, drawing, and film piece. Yazzie built a wooden cart that had a way to attach an easel so he could use an easel while driving in the cart. Riding down Monument Valley, he would try to replicate the landscape, including the buttes and mesas in view onto the easel attached to the wooden cart. While he rode and created, he would be filmed riding through the areas. This allows the observers to connect the piece to the environment Yazzie was traveling on and through. When displayed, the piece would include a video of Yazzie riding in the cart, the piece he created while on the cart and the piece he created.

=== Mountain Project ===
The Mountain Project started as a personal effort to understand the four outlying sacred mountains of the Navajo people better. This project is made of several different projects. The first phase of the project included traversing Sis' naajinni of Colorado and Dook' o' oosłíí of Arizona. Yazzie has expressed feelings of distance from the Navajo and his family because he cannot speak the language, so he used this project to try to understand the significance of these places more closely and personally. He video-recorded his process of hiking up the mountains, documenting his thoughts and explorations of the land. These works started as personal process of understanding and exploring the cultural importance of these mountains. As of August 2015, he is working on the next phase of this project, which aims to include the culture into his deeper discovery of his culture. He works to connect these works, which looks at the cultural and social impact and how that connects to his own personal experiences with the locations. He is developing the purpose of the project, which is to understand the connection of community and himself. He aims to help preserve the feeling of community and culture and the impact the location he is exploring on the community. This project was funded with the help of the 2015 Artist Research and Development Grant from the Arizona Commission on the Arts.

=== BWBY (Black White Blue Yellow) ===
Another project that includes the four sacred Navajo mountains is BWBY (Black White Blue Yellow). These colors represent the cardinal directions for the Navajo people, representing North, East, South, West, respectively. These colors and cardinal directions represent DIb' e Nitsaa, Sis' naajini, Tsoodzil, and Dook' o' słíí respectively. BWBY is a sound and video project. It explores the significance the mountain has on the continuation of the Navajo culture and knowledge that the mountains represent.

== Exhibitions and collections ==
Some exhibitions Yazzie has been a part of have been located at:

- Museum of Modern Art, New York, NY
- 2008: National Museum of the American Indian, New York, NY
- National Gallery of Canada, Ottawa, Art Gallery of Ontario, Toronto, Canada
- The Museum of Contemporary Native Art, Santa Fe, NM
- 2017: Heard Museum, Phoenix, AZ
- Phoenix Art Museum
- Arizona State University Art Museum
- Scottsdale Museum of Contemporary Art
- Tucson Museum of Contemporary Art
- Tucson Museum of Art
- Museum of Northern Arizona
- Skowhegan School of Painting and Sculpture, Maine
- Lew Allen Contemporary Art, Santa Fe, NM
- Berlin Gallery, Phoenix, AZ

== Honors and awards ==
Several awards Steven Yazzie has been awarded include:

- 2014 Outstanding Graduate for the Herberger Institute for Design and International Exhibitions
- Joan Mitchell Award

Some national and regional grants he has been awarded include:

- Mid Atlantic Arts Foundation
- National Endowment for the Arts
- 2015 Artist Research and Development Grant from the Arizona Commission of the Arts
