= Kade L. Twist =

Native American artist

- Born: 1971 (age 54–55); Bakersfield, California
- Citizenship: Cherokee Nation, American
- Education: Arizona State University, MFA
- Known for: Postcommodity
- Notable work: Repellent Fence (2015)
- Awards: USA Fellowship; 2015
- Website: www.otis.edu/faculty/kade-l-twist

Kade L. Twist (born 1971) is a Cherokee Nation interdisciplinary artist who works with video, sound, interactive media, text, and installation. Twist serves as the vice president of the Native Networking Policy Center. He is co-founder of Postcommodity, a Southwest Native American Artist collective, with Steven J. Yazzie (Navajo/Laguna Pueblo). His work has been displayed nationally and internationally.

== Early life and education ==
Kade Twist was born in 1971. Born and raised in Bakersfield, California, he is an enrolled citizen of Cherokee Nation. Twist's father is Charles Twist (Cherokee Nation).

In 1999, Twist first became a part of the American Indian Policy Seminar at American University. In 2003, he received a bachelor's degree in Native American studies with an emphasis in tribal policy from the University of Oklahoma. In 2012, he obtained a master's degree in fine arts, specifically focusing in intermedia from Arizona State University. Twist is known for being a contemporary artist. He is known for his work in video, sound, and interactive media.

Today, Kade L. Twist resides in Los Angeles, California. He is currently a professor in art and design at Otis College in Los Angeles, California.

Twist's focus is promoting equality among all races. To promote equality among all other races, he participated in the Repellent Fence project. This project aimed at bringing awareness of how country borders promote separation and inequality among people. Repellent Fence was made to symbolize as well as bring awareness to the disconnection between United States and Mexico.

== Postcommodity ==
Postcommodity is a Southwest Native American artist collective. Postcommodity was founded in 2007. This collective was founded by Kade L. Twist and Steven Yazzie. Over time, the number of members of this collective has expanded. Former members include Cristóbal Martínez (Chicano), Raven Chacon (Navajo), and Nathan Young (Delaware/Cherokee Nation/Kiowa/Pawnee). Postcommodity's art style falls in Multimedia. Postcommodity art is displayed by using metaphorical background to help convey their messages.

== Artworks ==
=== Repellent Fence – 2015 ===
The Repellent Fence project that Kade L. Twist participated in consisted of placing twenty-six "scare eye" balloons 2 miles intersecting the U.S. and Mexico border. The project intended to bring awareness of the connectedness between country borders. The balloons have a medicine color. Yellow-colored balloon with a red circle on all sides. The red circle has blue, black, and white circles as well. These balloons lined up around the land are tied up tightly to the ground. The Repellent Fence objective was to show people that the separation of the border affects indigenous people and it is a crisis that has evolved.

=== It's Easy to Live with Promises if You Believe They Are Only Ideas (2012) ===
This art project consists of a seven-channel video installation with sound. Twist decided to switch to art after writing because he said he felt he had more freedom in visual art. So he then created this video installation. In this video Twist exhibits images of a condor that he says has a connection with his Cherokee heritage. The Condors are shown to symbolize the issues of artifice that we face in a daily basis in life. These condors carry a tracking device that was implanted to keep track of them to capture natural photos of them.

=== P'oe iwe naví ûnp'oe dînmuu (My Blood is in the Water) (2010) ===
This piece of art is a mixed-media installation that comprises a sculpture and a sound element. The sculpture shown is a deceased mule deer hanging as its blood drips down to a Pueblo drum placed right beneath it. The metaphor being shown in this piece is an evaluation of the process of how indigenous people manage to put food on the table.

== Publications ==
- (2006) "New American City: artist look forward" by Marilyn Zeitlin; Patricia Gober; Heather Sealy Lineberry; John D Spiak; Kade L Twist; Arizona State University. Art Museum
- (2010) "Preface" By Kade L. Twist
- (2018) "Through the repellent fence" by Kade L. Twist; Raven Chacon; Cristobal Martinez; Chris Taylor; Lucy Lippard; Matt Coolidge; hoopla digital
- (2018) "Marginal Equity" by Kade L. Twist

== Solo exhibitions ==
- "It's Easy to Live with promises if you believe They Are Only Ideas"| by Kade L. Twist (2012)

== Group exhibitions ==
- SouthwestNET: Post commodity| Scottsdale Museum of Contemporary Art, Scottsdale (2015)
- The Santa Fe Art Project: Part 1| David Richard Gallery, Santa Fe, NM| (2016)
- Beyond| David Richard Gallery| Santa Fe, NM (2017)

== Collections ==
- Arizona State University Art Museum
- Art Gallery of Ontario, Toronto, Ontario
- Chelsea Art Museum, New York
- IAIA Museum of Contemporary Native Arts, Santa Fe, NM
- National Museum of the American Indian, George Gustav Heye Center, Smithsonian Institution, New York
- Academy of Fine Arts Museum, Santa Fe, NM
- National Museum of Art, Architecture and Design

== Awards ==
- Sequoyah Scholarship Award, University of Oklahoma (1998–1999)
- Professional Development Grant, Arizona Commission on the Arts (2007)
- Native Writers' Circle of Americas First book award for Amazing Grace (2007)
- Common Ground Grant, First Nations Composers Initiative, American for Amazing Grace —Postcommodity (2007)
- Common Ground Grant, First Nations Composers Initiative, American Composers Forum (2008)
- Runner-up Best Fictional Narrative Screenplay for Heavy Metal Indians, Co-written with Nathan Young, Tribeca Film Festival (2008)
- Artist Project Grant, Arizona Commission on the Arts – Post-Commodity (2009)
- Arizona Genius Award – Post-commodity (2010)
- Painters and Sculptors Grant (2010) – Post-Commodity
- Arizona State University Graduate Completion Fellowship (2012)
- Creative capital, Artist Grant – Post-Commodity (2012)
- Art Matters, Artist Grant (2013)
- Native Arts and Cultures Foundation, Community Inspiration Grants (2014)
- USA Fellowships (2015)
- Art for Change Ford Foundation Fellowship (2017)
- Carnegie international Fine Prize (2018)
