= Uýra Sodoma =

Brazilian indigenous artist

Uýra (born in Santarém, Pará, in 1991) is a Brazilian Indigenous travesti artist (two-spirit) also known by the stage name Uýra Sodoma. She holds a degree in biology and a master’s degree in ecology, and works in the field of art education. Uýra advocates for LGBTQIAPN+ rights and for the protection of the Amazon rainforest.

== Biography ==
Uýra was born in the village of Mojuí dos Campos, near Santarém in the state of Pará, in 1991. At the age of five, she moved with her parents and older sister to the capital city of Manaus, where they began life in an urban and marginalized environment. Her great-grandparents were migrants from the backlands of Ceará.

Her mother worked as a housekeeper, and her father was a tire repairman. She studied in public schools and chose to pursue biology after being encouraged by one of her teachers. She was able to complete her degree in biology thanks to various temporary jobs that helped support her throughout her studies, and later earned a master's degree in ecology from the National Institute of Amazonian Research (INPA). She worked in art education with riverside communities through the Fundação Amazônia Sustentável (Sustainable Amazon Foundation), where she also coordinated the “Incenturita” Project, benefiting 200 riverside and Indigenous children and adolescents from various regions of Amazonas.

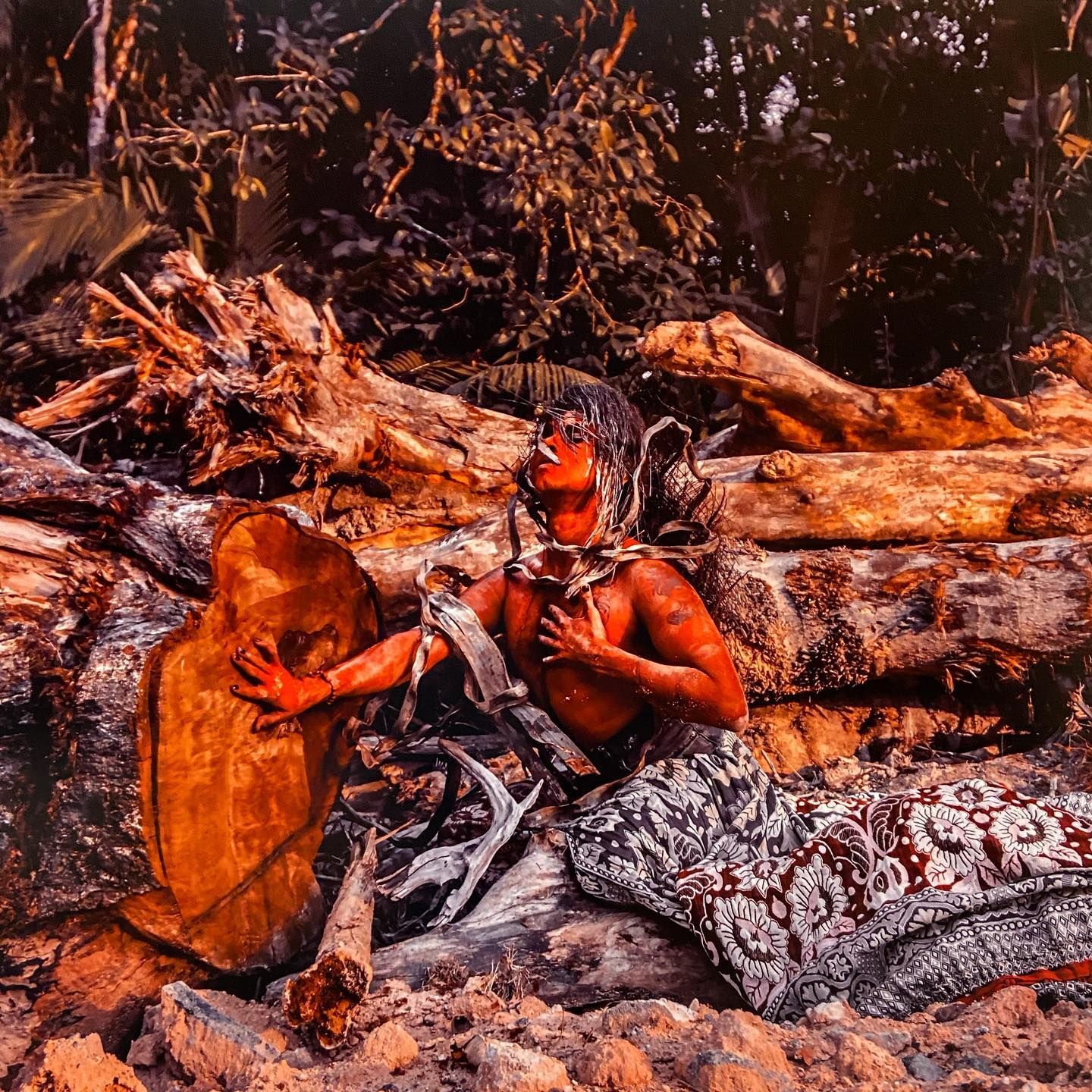
Uýra

Uýra Sodoma, an artist also known by the nickname "The Walking Tree," emerged during the impeachment of Dilma Rousseff in 2016, with the aim of sparking intersectional discussions around environmental issues, conservation, and both LGBTQ and Indigenous rights in her region and globally. Uyra stands for Uyrapuru, meaning the "singing bird".

The transformation into Uýra takes about two hours of makeup and assembly, always involving elements from nature: natural dyes, shells, branches, seeds, leaves, flowers, bark, fibers, and feathers. In her performances, Uýra transforms into animals and plants to denounce environmental abuses. Her performances take place across a variety of settings, ranging from forests to cities, and from galleries to schools.

“Everything that lives, changes”

— Uýra Sodoma

She is among the artists featured in the book Eco-Lógicas Latinas, which highlights Latin American artists and cultural projects that incorporate ecology into their work.

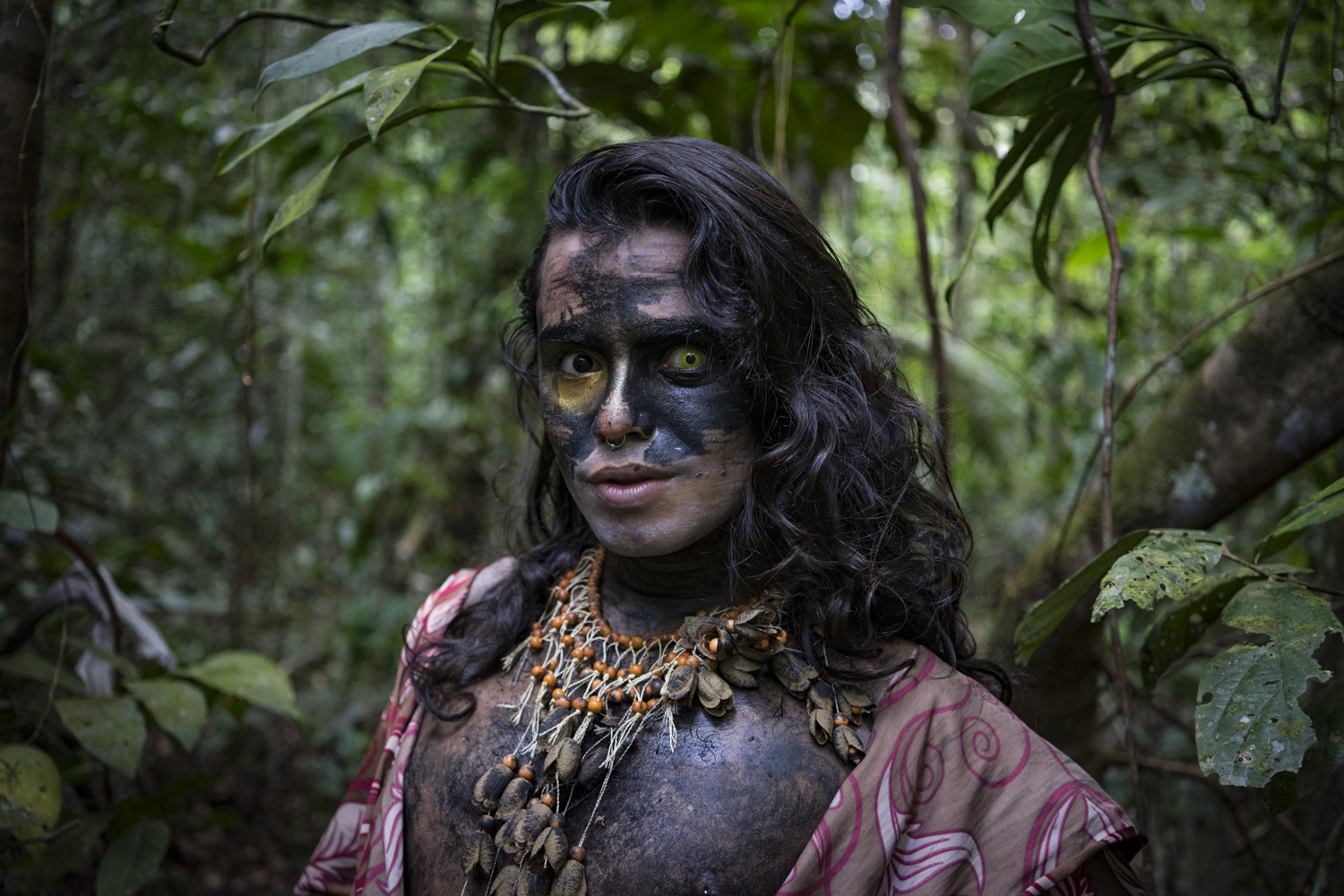
Uýra

== Awards and recognition ==
- 2020 – Featured on the cover of Vogue Brazil
- 2023 – FOCO Prize 2023
- 2023 – Sim à Igualdade Racial Award, in the category "Art in Motion"
- 2022 – PIPA Prize 2022
- 2021 – Featured in "Falas da Terra", a special program by Rede Globo on Indigenous Peoples Day
- 2017 – Winner of the Rival Rebolado drag queen competition, Manaus edition.

== Works ==
=== Performances ===
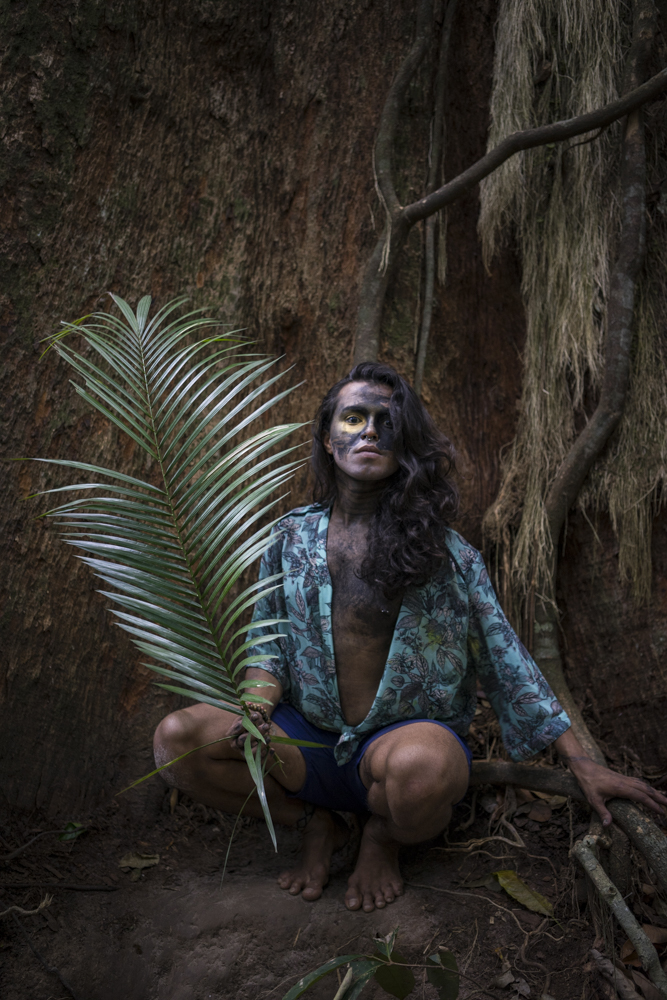
Uýra

In addition to exhibitions in international institutions in countries such as Austria, France, the Netherlands, Italy, and San Francisco, Uýra has also showcased work in:

- 2021 – "Performance Quintal" at the Federal University of Minas Gerais (UFMG)
- 2022 – UNSSC 20th Anniversary Art Exhibition
- 2020 – “Manaus, uma cidade na aldeia” at Instituto Moreira Salles
- 2023 – “Walking Trees and Other Tales of Stubbornness to Re-Enchant the World” at the Portuguese Catholic University
- 2023 – Centro Cultural Oi Futuro
- 2023 – "The Living Forest: Uýra" at the Currier Museum of Art (United States)
- 2022 – "Uýra: The Return of the Forest" at the 43rd São Paulo International Film Festival
- 2022 – World premiere of the autobiographical feature film Uýra: The Return of the Forest at the Frameline International Film Festival
- 2022 – Mimo Festival Porto
- 2022 – Museum of Art of Rio (MAR)
- 2022 – "Aqui Estamos" at the Museum of Modern Art (MAM Rio)
- 2022 – “PIPA Prize 2022” exhibition at Paço Imperial, Rio de Janeiro
- 2022 – Manisfesta! (Nomadic European Biennale)
- 2022 – PIPA Prize 2022
- 2022 – “Spiral of Death” at the São Paulo International Theater Festival (MITsp)
- 2022 – “The Walking Tree” at the 13th São Paulo International Architecture Biennial
- 2022 – “The Walking Tree” at the Paranaense Museum in Curitiba
- 2022 – “Watú Is Not Dead!” at the Institute for Brazilian Studies (IEB/USP)
- 2021 – 34th São Paulo Biennial
- 2020 – EDP Arts Award at Instituto Tomie Ohtake
- 2019 – Arte Pará Salon
- 2019 – “Uýra, The Walking Tree” at the Largo São Sebastião Visual Arts Gallery

=== Filmography ===
2022 – Uýra: The Return of the Forest, directed by Juliana Curi, featuring appearances by Indigenous activists and leaders (official trailer)
