= Cristóbal Martínez =

Chicano artist

Cristóbal Martínez is a Chicano artist and the founder of Radio Healer, an indigenous hacker collective. He is a member of Postcommodity, a Southwest Native American Artist collective. His work was featured in the 17th Whitney Biennial, 57th Carnegie International, and the Sundance Film Festival.

He is currently a professor in the School of Art at Arizona State University.

== Education ==
Martínez attended Arizona State University, where he earned a bachelor's degree in studio art and painting in 2002. He remained at the university to earn a master's degree in media art in 2011 and a PhD in rhetoric, composition, and linguistics in 2015.

In 2003, he founded the Radio Healer.

== Radio Healer ==
Martínez founded the indigenous hacker collective Radio Healer in 2003, a year after completing his first degree at Arizona State University. The collective is made up of Martínez, Melissa S. Rex, Mere Martinez, Rykelle Kemp, Randy Kemp, Ashya Flint, Edgar Cardenas, and Devin Armstrong-Best. Together they create indigenous electronic tools via circuit-bending, appropriation, salvaging, coding, recycling, adaptive reuse, and improvisation to perform indigenous ceremonies based on their imagination.

Their art consisted of moving tools, images, performances, and sounds that aided in creating metaphors to address the semiotic systems that they state are often misinterpreted. The purpose of their collective is to combat these misinterpretations by giving the audience an opportunity to engage in re-imagining indigenous ceremonies. The collective hosts public performances, with the intent that the public will reflect on issues such as warfare, borders, mass surveillance, land use, socioeconomic issues, and historical amnesia. The collective was a former artist-in-residence at the Pueblo Grande Museum in Phoenix Arizona.

=== Select artwork ===
- Animal Mother Moves the Four Winds of Rush Hour
- This Machine Kills___
- The Punisher (2012)
- Death Machine

=== Art residences ===
- Pueblo Grande Museum, Phoenix, Arizona 2011-2016

=== Awards and grants ===
- Artist Research and Development Grant 2016
- P.A.V.E 2009

=== Group exhibitions ===
- Connected Knowledge: Collaboration Across Boundaries 2007, Banff Centre, Banff, Canada
- Faces, Tempe Center for the Arts, 2009, Tempe, Arizona
- Phoenix Experimental Arts Festival, 2010, Phoenix, Arizona
- ACM CHI Human Factors in Computing Systems, 2010, Atlanta, Georgia
- Arizona Science and Technology Festival Conference, Skysong, 2014, Scottsdale, Arizona

== Postcommodity ==
Martínez is a member of Postcommodity, an interdisciplinary artist collective consisting of himself and Kade L. Twist. The collective's aim is to form metaphors to make sense of shared experiences in a contemporary environment, create productive conversations that go against social, political, and economic processes that ruining communities and ruining geographic areas.

Their work has exhibited in locations and events such as the Whitney Museum of American Art's 2017 Biennial.

=== Select artwork ===
- Repellent Fence (2015)
- How The Lights Get In (2019, with Guillermo Galindo)
- The Point of Final Collapse (2019)

=== Art residences ===
- Santa Fe Art Institute, Santa Fe, New Mexico, 2011
- Denver Art Museum, Denver, Colorado, 2014
- Concordia University, Montreal, Canada, 2015
- SOMA, Mexico City, Mexico, 2016
- Princeton University Art Museum, Princeton, New Jersey, 2017
- 18th Street Art Center, Santa Monica, California, 2019
- San Francisco Art Institute 2018-2019

=== Awards and grants ===
- Cycles of Creation, Decay and Renewal in Art and Life, Santa Fe Art Institute 2011
- Creative Capital Artist Grant 2012
- Art Matters Grant 2013
- Native Arts and Cultures Foundation Grant 2014
- Art of Change Fellowship, Ford Foundation 2017
- Fine Prize Carnegie Hall 2018
