= 2026 Whitney Biennial =

82nd edition of the New York art biennial

- Genre: Art exhibition
- Begins: Mar 8, 2026
- Ends: Aug 23, 2026
- Location: New York City
- Country: United States
- Previous event: 2024 Whitney Biennial
- Organizer: Whitney Museum

The 2026 Whitney Biennial is the 82nd edition of the Whitney Museum's art biennial, running from March 8th to August 23rd, 2026.

Curated by Marcela Guerrero and Drew Sawyer, the 2026 Biennial opened on March 8, 2026.

Erin Jane Nelson participated in the 2026 Whitney Biennial at the Whitney Museum of America Art in New York. Her presentation included a series of ceramic works and camera-based sculptures made between 2024 and 2025, including Angel Cam, Sunflower Cam, and Bunny Cam.

== Artists ==
The Biennial participating artists were announced on December 15, 2025. The show opened on March 8, 2026.

- Basel Abbas & Ruanne Abou-Rahme
- Kamrooz Aram
- Ash Arder
- Teresa Baker
- Sula Bermudez-Silverman
- Zach Blas
- Enzo Camacho & Ami Lien
- Leo Castañeda
- CFGNY (Daniel Chew, Ten Izu, Kirsten Kilponen, Tin Nguyen)
- Nani Chacon
- Maia Chao
- Joshua Citarella
- Mo Costello
- Taína H. Cruz
- Carmen de Monteflores
- Ali Eyal
- Andrea Fraser
- Mariah Garnett
- Ignacio Gatica
- Jonathan González
- Emilie Louise Gossiaux
- Kainoa Gruspe
- Martine Gutierrez
- Samia Halaby
- Raven Halfmoon
- Nile Harris with Dyer Rhoads
- Aziz Hazara
- Margaret Honda
- Akira Ikezoe
- Mao Ishikawa
- Cooper Jacoby
- David L. Johnson
- kekahi wahi (Sancia Miala Shiba Nash, Drew K. Broderick)
- Young Joon Kwak
- Michelle Lopez
- José Maceda
- Agosto Machado
- Oswaldo Maciá
- Emilio Martínez Poppe
- Isabelle Frances McGuire
- Kimowan Metchewais
- Nour Mobarak
- Erin Jane Nelson
- Precious Okoyomon
- Aki Onda
- Pat Oleszko
- Malcolm Peacock
- Sarah M. Rodriguez
- Gabriela Ruiz
- Jasmin Sian
- Jordan Strafer
- Sung Tieu
- Julio Torres
- Anna Tsouhlarakis
- Johanna Unzueta

== See also ==
- Whitney Biennial
- List of Whitney Biennial artists
- List of Whitney Biennial curators
