= 2024 Whitney Biennial =

81th edition of the New York art biennial

- Genre: Art exhibition
- Begins: March 20, 2024
- Ends: August 11, 2024
- Location: New York City
- Country: United States
- Previous event: 2022 Whitney Biennial
- Next event: 2026 Whitney Biennial
- Organizer: Whitney Museum

The 2024 Whitney Biennial, titled Even Better than the Real Thing, is the 81st edition of the Whitney Museum's art biennial, hosted between March and August 2024.

== Artists ==
The Biennial participating artists were announced on January 25, 2024. The show opened from March 20 to August 11, 2024.

- Siku Allooloo
- Holland Andrews
- Eddie Rodolfo Aparicio
- Dora Budor
- Seba Calfuqueo
- Debit (Delia Beatriz)
- Demian DinéYazhi
- Torkwase Dyson
- JJJJJerome Ellis
- Jes Fan
- Nikita Gale
- ektor garcia
- Pippa Garner
- Harmony Hammond
- Christopher Harris
- Sharon Hayes
- Miranda Haymon
- Sarah Hennies
- Holly Herndon & Mat Dryhurst
- Ho Tzu Nyen
- Yasmine Anlan Huang
- Madeleine Hunt-Ehrlich
- Suzanne Jackson
- Isaac Julien
- Lotus L. Kang
- Aron Kantor
- Mary Kelly (artist)
- Suzanne Kite
- Gbenga Komolafe & Tee Park
- Jenni Laiti
- Carolyn Lazard
- Dionne Lee
- Ligia Lewis
- Shuang Li
- Simon Liu
- Mary Lovelace O'Neal
- Cannupa Hanska Luger
- Nyala Moon
- K.R.M. Mooney
- Niillasaš-Jovnna Máreha Juhani Sunná Máret
- Dala Nasser
- Diane Severin Nguyen
- Karyn Oliver
- B. Ingrid Olson
- Eamon Ore-Giron
- Edward_Owens_(filmmaker)
- Sydney Frances Pascal
- People Who Stutter Create
- Julia Phillips
- Mavis Pusey
- Raqs Media Collective
- Riar Rizaldi
- Maja Ruznic
- Ser Serpas
- Rose B. Simpson
- Penelope Spheeris
- P. Staff
- Lada Suomenrinne
- Alex Tatarsky
- Alisi Telengut
- Clarissa Tossin
- Tourmaline (activist)
- Chanelle Tyson
- Zulaa Urchuud
- Charisse Pearlina Weston
- Kiyan Williams
- Carmen Winant
- Takako Yamaguchi
- Constantina Zavitsanos

== See also ==
- Whitney Biennial
- List of Whitney Biennial artists
- List of Whitney Biennial curators
