= Michael Jackson (Warhol) =

1984 portrait by Andy Warhol

- Artist: Andy Warhol
- Year: 1984
- Medium: Synthetic polymer and silkscreen inks on canvas
- Movement: Pop Art
- Subject: Michael Jackson
- Dimensions: 76 cm × 66 cm (30 in × 26 in)
- Location: National Portrait Gallery, Washington, D.C.
- Accession: NPG.86.TC14

Michael Jackson is a 1984 painting by the American artist Andy Warhol. Created as part of a portrait commission for Time magazine's March 19, 1984 cover story, the work depicts pop star Michael Jackson during the height of his commercial success of Thriller (1982). Executed in synthetic polymer paint and silkscreen ink on canvas, the work is part of a small series of images Warhol produced from a single image, exemplifying his late-career approach to celebrity portraiture. The painting is considered one of Warhol's most recognizable depictions of a 1980s cultural icon and is in the collection of the National Portrait Gallery in Washington, D.C.

== Background ==
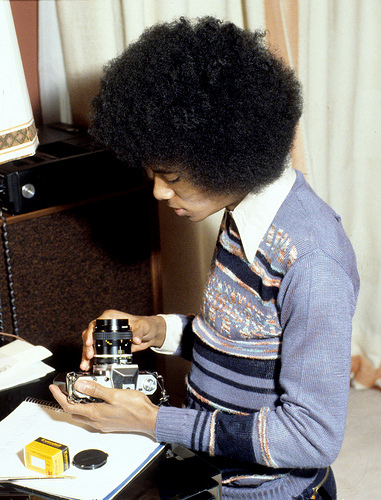
Jackson in his New York apartment in 1977. He met Warhol for the first time that year.

By 1984, artist Andy Warhol had long been established as a leading figure of the Pop art movement, known for his silkscreen portraits of celebrities and cultural icons. In March of that year, Warhol was commissioned by Time magazine to produce a portrait of pop star Michael Jackson for the cover story "Why he's a Thriller?" following the massive success of his 1982 album Thriller. Jackson had achieved unprecedented global fame by this time, setting records in popular music and receiving a record eight Grammy Awards for Thriller in 1984. The opportunity to portray Jackson aligned with Warhol's longstanding interest in celebrity culture.

=== Jackson and Warhol ===
Jackson and Warhol were personally acquainted, as documented in The Andy Warhol Diaries (1989). They socialized at the Studio 54 nightclub in New York City. Jackson was also featured in Warhol's Interview magazine, and Warhol attended several of his concerts. The two first met on February 2, 1977, when Warhol and socialite Catherine Guinness interviewed Jackson for Interview. Warhol recalled in his diary:

"Catherine and I went over to Regine's to interview Michael Jackson of the Jackson 5. He's very tall now, but he has a really high voice. He had a big guy with him, maybe a bodyguard, and the girl from The Wiz. The whole situation was funny because Catherine and I didn't know anything about Michael Jackson, really, and he didn't know anything about me—he thought I was a poet or something like that. So he was asking questions that nobody who knew me would ask—like if I was married, if I had any kids, if my mother was alive.... (laughs) I told him, 'She's in a home.' We tried to get Michael to dance and at first he wouldn't but then he and the girl from The Wiz got up and did one dance."

Later that year, on October 11, 1977, Warhol recalled chatting with Jackson at a party for Elton John at Studio 54: "Stevie [Rubell] "invited us all up to the booth where Michael Jackson was, and Michael was sweet—in his high voice he asked me about art." A few years later on January 9, 1979, Warhol and his boyfriend Jed Johnson went to see Jackson in the film The Wiz. Warhol remarked:

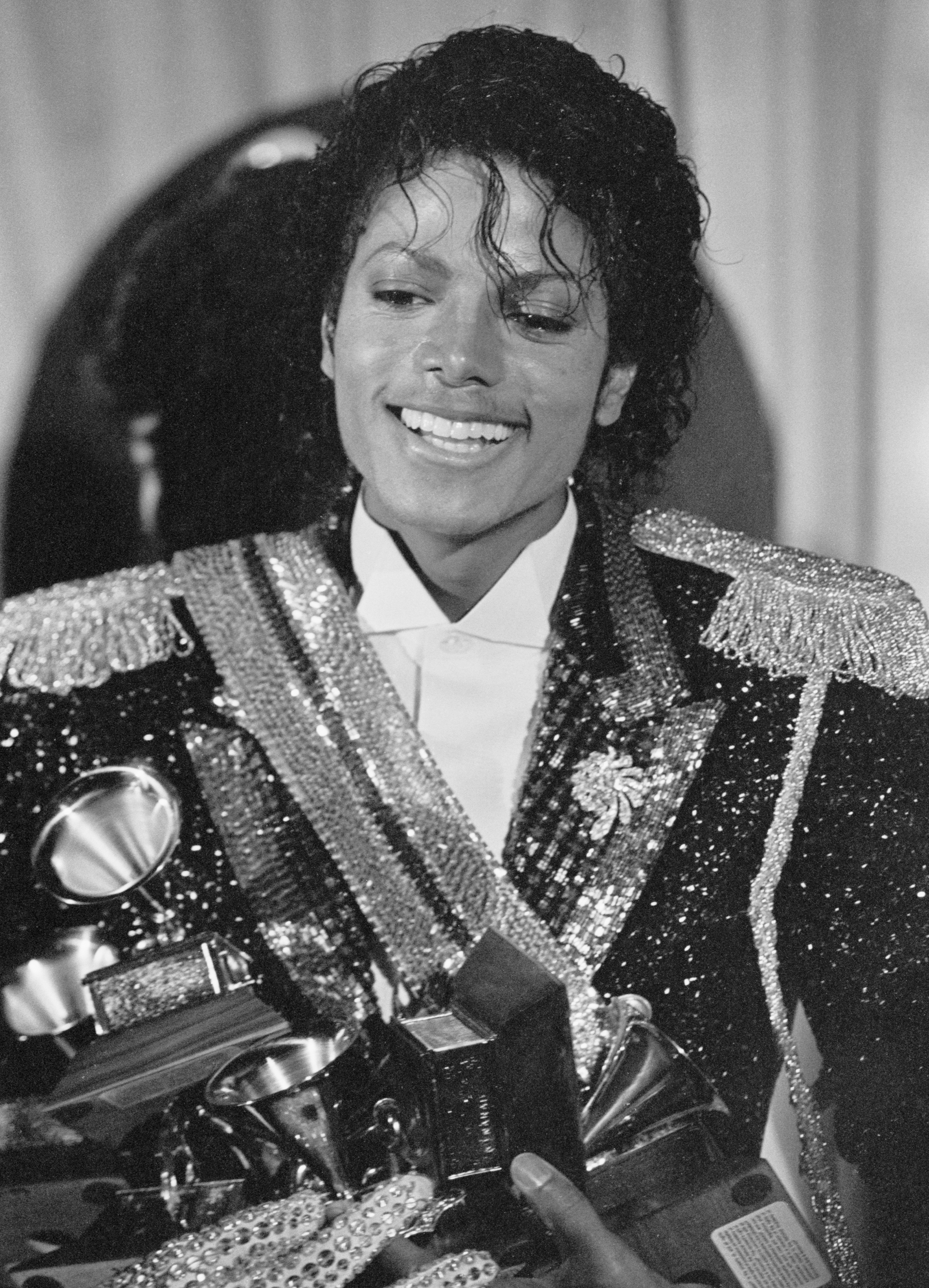
Jackson holds his record-breaking 8 Grammy Awards at the 1984 Grammy. Warhol painted his portrait that year.

"I wanted to see The Wiz, so Jed and I cabbed to the Plaza (cab $2, tickets $10). The movie looked so cheap, and they made Diana Ross so ugly and they made Michael Jackson ugly. Sidney Lumet must hate women—he photographed them 'up.' You could see right up Lena Horne's nostrils. She's his ex-mother-in-law. The play was a lot better, with the Geoffrey Holder dancers."

In August 1981, Warhol attended both of the Jacksons' Triumph Tour at Madison Square Garden in New York City. On August 17, he recorded, "Susan Blond called to invite me backstage to see Michael Jackson on Tuesday and Wednesday, and she wants me to get Liza Minnelli, but I haven't been able to." The next day, Jackson introduced him to his brothers, who all wanted portraits. Warhol observed, "Michael's gotten so handsome since I saw him that time with Stephanie Mills," and he praised the show as "maybe the best I've seen. He's such a good dancer." On August 20, Marlon Jackson visited Warhol's studio, the Factory, and Warhol mentioned wanting to feature Michael on the cover of Interview magazine. Jackson eventually appeared on the cover of the October 1982 issue of Interview, photographed by Matthew Rolston, which sold "very well."

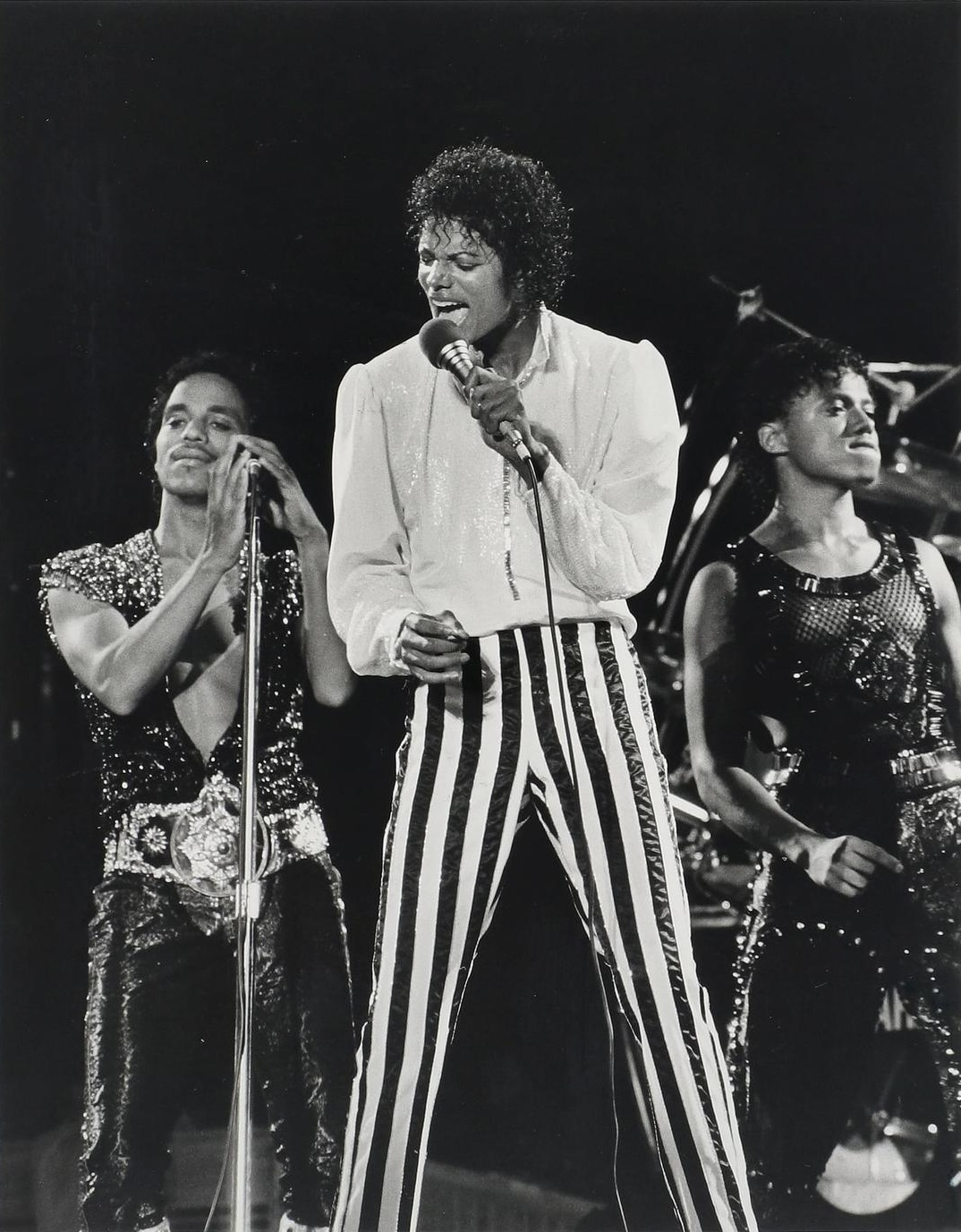
Jackson on stage with his brothers Marlon Jackson and Randy Jackson during the Victory Tour in 1984. Warhol attended a show at Madison Square Garden.

On November 30, 1983, Warhol attended the Jacksons' Victory Tour announcement at the Tavern on the Green in New York City. On February 7, 1984, he attended the "Thriller Party" at the Museum of Natural History, where Jackson received awards from CBS Records and Guinness World Records. Shortly after, Time magazine commissioned Warhol to create a cover portrait, providing a photo on February 29; by March 7, the painting was complete. Warhol later met Jackson backstage during the Victory Tour at Madison Square Garden on August 4, 1984, recalling: "Susan Blond pushed me into his arms and he was shy… I shook his hand and it was like foam rubber. The sequined glove isn't just a little sequined glove, it's like a catcher's mitt. Everything has to be bigger than life for the stage."

Warhol attempted to meet Jackson to view Bouguereau paintings with collector Stuart Pivar a few times. On October 1, 1984, he mentioned Jackson was supposed to call Pivar, who "went out for a minute and missed the call, but he might come today. … Those Bouguereaus are now $2 million apiece and Stuart has about four. … It's funny, they're just the perfect paintings for Michael Jackson like ten-year-old boys with fairy wings, around beautiful women." They did not meet, and Warhol noted on November 15, 1986: "Stuart picked me up and Michael Jackson was staying across the street at the Helmsley Palace and we went to a gallery near there to look at Bouguereaus. Stuart's going to try to see him this time. The last time he blew it." A few days later on November 18, Warhol mentioned that "Jackson never did show up. He called and cancelled right before he was supposed to be there."

Years after Warhol's death, the connection between the artist and Jackson was referenced in the 1995 music video for "Scream," performed by Jackson and his sister Janet Jackson, in which a self-portrait of Warhol morphs into a splatter painting in the style of Jackson Pollock.

== Composition ==
Michael Jackson depicts the singer smiling and wearing the red jacket from the "Thriller" music video. The portrait is rendered in Warhol's signature silkscreen style, using vivid, high-contrast colors and gestural accents, including blue strokes in the hair. Set against a bright yellow background, the image emphasizes Jackson's facial features with bold tonal contrasts, consistent with Warhol's treatment of celebrity subjects.

The work measures approximately 30 × 26 in (76.2 × 66 cm) and is executed in synthetic polymer paint and silkscreen ink on canvas. It is one of a small group of silkscreened portraits of Jackson produced in 1984; Warhol created at least six images from a silkscreen he developed for a Time magazine cover in March of that year. Once he completed the cover, Warhol reflected, "I didn't like it but the office kids did." After seeing it published, he observed, "The cover should have had more blue. I gave them some in the style of the Fonda cover I did for Time once, but they wanted this style."

== Technique ==
Warhol worked from a photograph of Jackson, transferring the image onto canvas using a silkscreen process often carried out by assistants, and then retouched the surface with paint. As he explained, "I sort of half paint them just to give it a style." According to Sally King-Nero, executive editor of the Andy Warhol Catalogue Raisonné at the Andy Warhol Foundation for the Visual Arts, Warhol kept inconsistent records and frequently produced multiple versions from a single screen, making it possible that additional portraits of Jackson exist.

== Collection ==
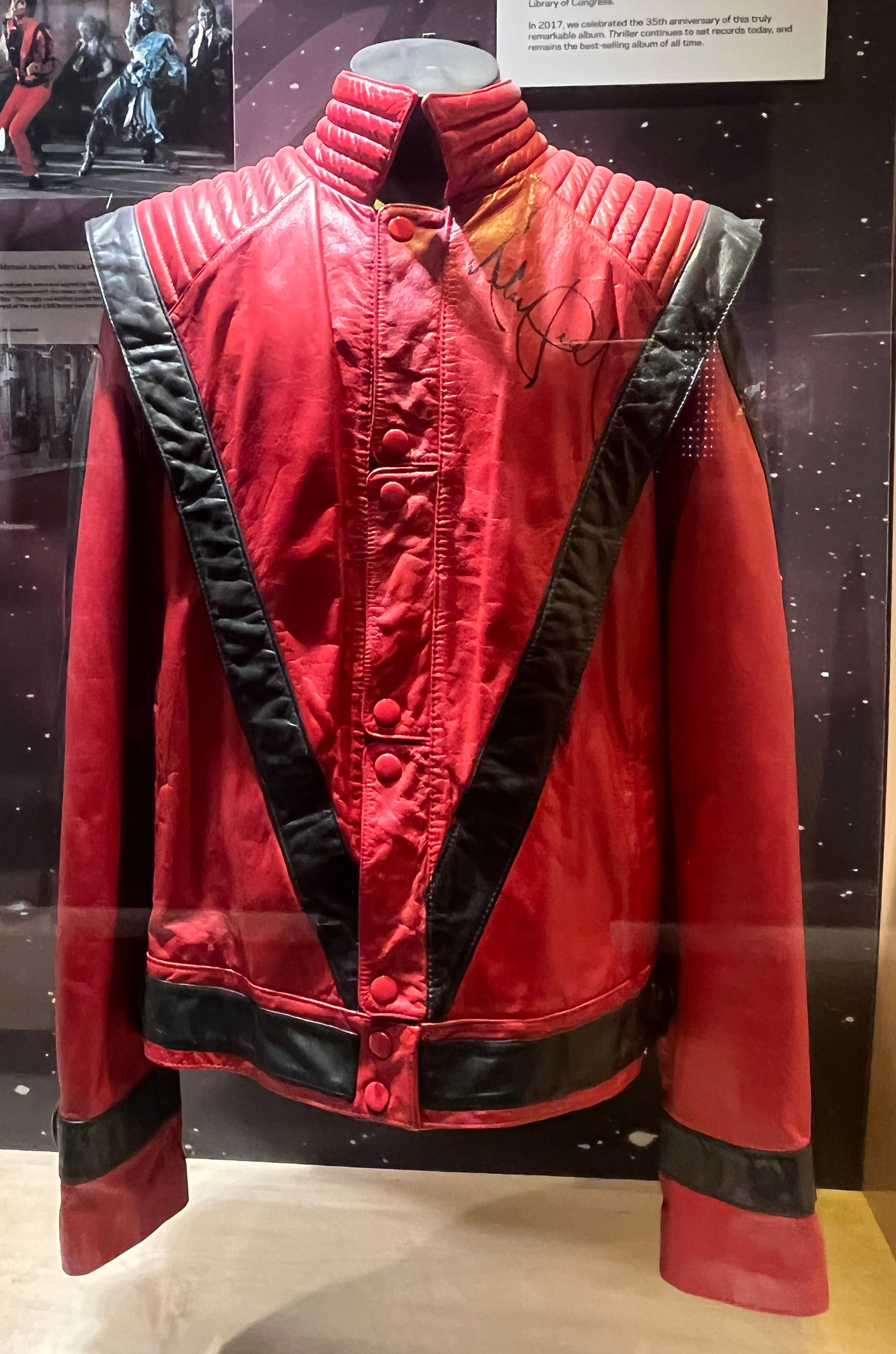
The jacket Jackson wore in the painting from his 1983 "Thriller" music video is seen here on display at the Grammy Museum at L.A. Live

The painting is owned by the National Portrait Gallery in Washington, D.C., as part of its collection acquired through an agreement with Time magazine. It was included in the National Portrait Gallery's exhibition Michael Jackson: On the Wall in 2018.

== Art market ==
Individual works from the Michael Jackson series, including prints and paintings, have appeared at auction houses and in private sales. Several pieces have sold for significant sums, reflecting sustained interest in Warhol's depictions of cultural icons.

In November 2006, one of Warhol's Michael Jackson paintings, set against a red background, sold for $576,000 at Christie's in New York.

A version of Michael Jackson against a yellow background on canvas sold at Sotheby's in New York for $287,500 in May 2009. Following Jackson's death in June 2009, demand for Warhol's portraits of the singer increased sharply, and the same work was resold shortly thereafter by the Vered Gallery for over $1 million to an anonymous buyer. Market observers noted that the surge in value was driven largely by heightened interest after Jackson's death rather than a broader rise in Warhol prices. Works from the 1960s—such as his silkscreened images of Marilyn Monroe and Elizabeth Taylor—typically command the highest prices, reflecting their looser, more iconic style, in contrast to the tighter and more complex portraits of Jackson produced in the 1980s.

In November 2009, a Michael Jackson painting against a blue background with squiggles of red and yellow in his hair sold for $812,000 at Christie's in New York.

In November 2012, a teal Michael Jackson screenprint with brown accents sold for $47,500 at Christie's in New York.
