= Agosto Machado =

American artist (died 2026)

Agosto Machado (died March 21, 2026) was an American performance and visual artist, activist, and archivist. He was a major figure in the New York City downtown arts scene beginning in the 1960s. He was a member of the pioneering gay activist group the Gay Activists Alliance.

== Biography ==
Machado was born in Manhattan, likely in September or October in the late 1930s. He was of Chinese, Spanish, and Filipino descent, and was orphaned as a child. He grew up in the Hell's Kitchen neighborhood of New York City before moving to downtown neighborhoods such as Greenwich Village and the East Village in the late 1950s. Between the early 1970s and late 1990s, he lived in an apartment in an East Village tenement at 54 East 4th Street. Machado then moved one block south to East Third Street, naming this space "The Forbidden City."

As a child, Machado frequently suffered from food insecurity and started collecting pictures of food from newspapers and magazines. His collection grew to include a diverse array of objects including "costumes, photos, artworks, toys, posters, notes, jewelry, footwear, and more."

Machado chose the name Agosto Machado for himself in 1959. The name "Machado" was a tribute to the Chinese-Portuguese fashion model China Machado.

The first play he was in was Vain Victory by Jackie Curtis in 1971. He performed with various experimental theater productions in downtown Manhattan venues, including Caffe Cino and La MaMa. He appeared regularly with Ethyl Eichelberger until the drag star's death in 1990.

During the AIDS crisis in New York City, Machado spent roughly twelve years caring for friends. Due to stigmatization of HIV/AIDS patients and ignorance of disease transmission, Machado and his friends were frequently ostracized in social settings.

=== Activism ===
He was active in the Stonewall Riots in 1969. When reflecting on the Riots, he said, "The situation at hand was like a magnet. With street kids like me, we had nothing to lose. That was the action of the moment and the time. It was an event." He was a member of the pioneering gay activist group the Gay Activists Alliance.

=== Assemblages ===
As an artist, Machado constructed shrine-like assemblages, often to friends who had died of HIV/AIDS in the 1980s. The shrines compile belongings and ephemera to memorialize the lives of subjects such as Eichelberger, Anna May Wong, Marsha P. Johnson, Peter Hujar, and David Wojnarowicz. Gallerists Sam Gordon and Jacob Robichaux mounted exhibitions of Machado's work in 2022 at their gallery, Gordon Robichaux, and in 2024 at Art Basel Miami Beach. Shrines were acquired by the Museum of Modern Art and the Whitney Museum of American Art. In 2026, four of his shrines, including one to Eichelberger, were selected for the 2026 Whitney Biennial.

=== Death ===
Machado died in New York City on March 21, 2026. He directed his representatives not to reveal his age or birth year upon his death, having previously said of the decision, "A lady never tells." frieze reported that Machado was "believed to be in his 80s".
