= Joshua Citarella =

American artist and writer (born 1987)

- Citarella in 2024
- Born: 1987 (age 38–39)
- Website: joshuacitarella.com

Joshua Citarella is an artist and writer from New York City whose work is primarily focused on online communities and internet culture. He is host of the Doomscroll podcast and creator of the online platform Do Not Research.

== Early life and education ==
Citarella attended the School of Visual Arts in New York, where he learned both traditional darkroom photography and digital techniques during a period when the school was transitioning its focus from the former to the latter.

== Career ==
Following his graduation, Citarella was involved with an artist collective concentrated on digital culture and advertising. His ongoing work with Brad Troemel began during this period with The Jogging, a collaborative project initiated in 2009 in which audience-submitted photos were posted to Tumblr to be examined as art.

In 2013, Citarella made his artistic debut with a series of five chromogenic still life photos at Higher Pictures, a photographic art gallery in New York, New York. The series included Body Anointed with Nitroglycerin Awaits Transfiguration, depicting a "reclining nude woman, partially covered in silver, with little flecks of skin and paint floating around her," with some nitroglycerin smudging the frame. Andrew Russeth of The Observer describes the work as showing "exacting detail" instilling in viewers a "discomfort [that]...is also a sign that Mr. Citarella is closely attuned to the intricate traps of image production today."

In 2016, Citarella continued his collaboration with Troemel, collaborating on an Etsy store titled Ultra Violet Production House, providing the buyer with a material kit and fabrication guide to build the work of art. As of January 2017, the two had put up seventy-eight artworks for sale, most of them consisting of a commonplace object in a manner that develops a sense of absurdity.

In 2017, Citarella presented a 12-by-8-foot triptych, titled SWIM A Few Years From Now, at The Armory Show. The work depicts his vision of how life in an American anarcho-capitalist society could manifest. Writing for Artsy, Scott Indrisek notes that the piece displays "a canny blend of analog photography and digital trickery, with many images borrowed from the internet... [it] has the slickness of a dystopian IKEA catalog spread."

In 2018, Citarella published the book Politigram & the Post-Left. The book is a research project concentrating on niche political Instagram accounts found collectively within the "Politigram" (Political Instagram) community. Citarella published another book in 2020 titled 20 Interviews, which is a collection of interviews from users on Politigram.

In 2019, Citarella worked as an adjunct professor at the School of Visual Arts.

In 2024, Citarella began to host the Doomscroll podcast. Podcast guests have included Matty Healy, Adam Friedland, Ezra Klein, Catherine Liu, Andrew Callaghan, Brace Belden, Claire Valdez, and Dasha Nekrasova. Doomscroll was featured in the 2026 Whitney Biennial, with multiple episodes being recorded at the museum.
