= Charisse Pearlina Weston =

American artist (born 1988)

- Born: 1988 (age 37–38); Houston, Texas, U.S.
- Education: University of North Texas; Edinburgh College of Art; University of California, Irvine
- Awards: Guggenheim Fellowship (2025)

Charisse Pearlina Weston (born 1988) is an American conceptual artist. A 2025 Guggenheim Fellow, she uses glass as a symbol of fragility.

== Biography ==
Weston was born in 1988 in Houston, where she was later raised. She earned her Bachelor of Arts degree from the University of North Texas and a Master of Science in Modern Art: History, Curating, and Criticism from the Edinburgh College of Art. In 2016, she started using glass for her artwork. In 2019, she obtained a Master of Fine Arts in Studio Art with a critical theory emphasis from the University of California, Irvine. She also attended the Whitney Independent Study Program in 2020.

Weston received the Corning Museum of Glass's 2022 Rakow Commission, which involved an exhibition of to appear before the first beat of unwilling end (anacrusis), her multimedia work drawing on the January 6 United States Capitol attack as a theme. She was also an artist-in-residence at the Museum of Arts and Design (winning their 2021 Burke Prize), Studio Museum in Harlem (2022-2023), and UrbanGlass. From October 2022 to March 2023, she held her first solo exhibition, of [a] tomorrow: lighter than air, stronger than whiskey, cheaper than dust, at Queens Museum. Her un- (anterior ellipse[s] as mangled container; or where edges meet to wedge and [un]moor), an installation piece made of a large smoked glass panel hung from cables, appeared at the 2024 Whitney Biennial; Sarah P. Hanson of Art Basel said that her piece "is emblematic of how the artist meets 'the materiality of surveillance' with what she calls 'tactics of Black refusal'". In 2025, she was awarded a Guggenheim Fellowship in Fine Arts. She also did another solo show at Jack Shainman Gallery in December 2025. She was awarded the 2026 Hermitage Greenfield Prize.

Weston uses glass as an important part of her work, with Maegan Dolan of Financial Times noting that it is "often [done] in precarious ways". Weston explained in an interview with Bomb uses glass in her work "because of its fragility and the danger inherent to its breaking; I’m intrigued by the omnipresence of collapse implicit within its materiality".

Weston has published a book titled Awaiting, released by Ugly Duckling Presse in March 2023, which advertises as "part autobiography, part play, part fictive dream as long poem" and uses Waiting for Godot and Lorraine Hansberry's play What Use Are Flowers? as inspiration.

Weston is based in Brooklyn, with her studio based in Harlem. In 2024, she became represented by Jack Shainman Gallery. She also collaborates with her father Robert Weston Sr., also an artist.
