= Maja Ruznic =

Bosnian-born American painter

- Born: 1983 (age 42–43); Socialist Federal Republic of Yugoslavia (now Bosnia and Herzegovina)
- Education: California College of the Arts; University of California, Berkeley
- Known for: Painting, printmaking
- Spouse: Æmen Ededéen
- Website: Maja Ruznic

Maja Ruznic, The Arrival of Wild Gods, 2022, oil on linen; in three parts, 100" × 76" (each), 100" × 228.5" (overall).

Maja Ruznic (born 1983) is a Bosnia-Herzegovina-born, New Mexico-based visual artist. She is known for introspective, color field-like paintings that merge figuration and abstraction through ghostly forms that materialize out of fluid, undefined spaces. Ruznic's work draws upon art history, personal experience, and interests in mystical belief, folklore and psychoanalytic thought. She explores themes involving spiritual transcendence, family relationships and motherhood, and the experience of shared trauma. Critic Barry Schwabsky wrote that Ruznic's compositions effect "a dreamy, quasi-symbolist vibe" in which permeable, uncertain boundaries between figures, forms and spaces convey "the idea that there are goings-on in the world that are inaccessible to a purely empirical perception."

Ruznic's work belongs to the public collections of the Whitney Museum, Musée d'Art Moderne de Paris, San Francisco Museum of Modern Art , and Dallas Museum of Art, among others. She has exhibited at the Aspen Art Museum, Harwood Museum of Art, Museo di Palazzo Pretorio and Roswell Museum and Art Center. She was selected to appear in the Whitney Biennial In 2024 and SITE Santa Fe in 2025.

== Life and career ==
Ruznic was born in Bosnia and Herzegovina (then Yugoslavia) in 1983. At age nine, she fled the Bosnian War with her mother, moving between several European refugee camps before settling in San Francisco three years later in 1995. Ruznic studied art at the University of California, Berkeley, completing a BFA in 2005, and earned an MFA from California College of the Arts in 2009. After living in Los Angeles, she moved to the desert area of Roswell, New Mexico in 2019 and currently lives with her husband, artist Æmen Ededéen (formerly Joshua Hagler), in Placitas, NM.

Ruznic has had solo exhibitions at the Harwood Museum of Art (2021) and Tamarind Institute (2022), and at galleries including Karma (New York), Conduit Gallery (Dallas), Contemporary Fine Arts (Berlin) and Jack Fischer Gallery (San Francisco).

== Work and reception ==
Ruznic's work has been characterized by critics as art-historically informed, sharing connections with pre-modernist symbolist and magical realist figuration as well as modernists such as Paul Klee and the color field painters. New York Times critic John Vincler wrote, "Ruznic conjures many other artists while remaining firmly her own. Her abstract paintings and backgrounds recall the saturated tones of Clyfford Still and, at their best, approach the reverential awe of Mark Rothko." Aspects of her artwork have also been compared to the biomorphic forms of Louise Bourgeois, the symbolic geometries of Hilma af Klint, and the patterning of Gustav Klimt. Beyond art history, Ruznic's work is influenced by mythology, mystical practices like shamanism, and psychoanalytic concepts such as Carl Jung's shadow self and Bracha L. Ettinger's theories of co-emergence and matrixial space.

Critics observe that Ruznic's loose compositions, figures and themes arise out of her exploration of materials—the physical reality of the paintings—rather than from preconceived ideas, sketches or photographs. She paints intuitively, building atmospheric fields out of thin washes and gestural scumblings of oil paint or gouache that leave areas of bare canvas exposed. Her method creates a palimpsestic effect with visible traces of prior layers from which she pulls out ephemeral forms. Reviewers suggest that color—often highly saturated—anchors Ruznic's work, serving as both an emotional fulcrum to directly affect viewers' nervous systems and as a means to a personal symbolism in which hues represent specific places and people in her life.

Like the recurring, diaphanous forms she creates, Ruznic's themes primarily register on a tenuous, open-ended level as implications, archetypes and feelings rather than clear narratives. Her subject matter has largely revolved around experiences of trauma, migration and loss; collective memory and identity; motherhood and family relationships; and hope, recovery and interdependence in the face of suffering.

=== Bodies of work and exhibitions ===
Ruznic's work of the 2010s was rooted in her early refugee experiences of shared trauma, displacement and loss. During that period, she produced paintings of fragmented, spectral figures and textile sculptures of disfigured, phantom-like forms that conveyed a sense of emotional and physical pain; the painted figures often engaged in cryptic rituals connected to the land or intercession between worldly and spiritual realms. Her painting exhibition, "My Noiseless Entourage" (2020), featured aqueous figurative groupings that ranged in expression from suffering—as in The Wailer (2019), likened by a reviewer to Picasso's Guernica)—to the suggestion of interdependence and healing (e.g., Truth Seekers and In Search of New Hope, 2019).

Maja Ruznic, Azmira & Maja, 2023–24, oil on linen, 90" x 70"; collection of Musée d’Art Moderne de Paris.

After becoming pregnant in 2020, Ruznic shifted toward more transcendent themes involving childbirth and impending motherhood, which she presented in the Harwood Museum show, "In the Sliver of the Sun" (2021). In her subsequent exhibitions "Consulting with Shadows" (2022) and "Geometry of Exile" (2023), she continued in that direction, exploring the nocturnal, half-waking, half-asleep space of early parenthood. These saturated and layered paintings depicted an otherworldly realm of fractured forms resembling squatting bodies, eggs and breasts in flux within emergent, geometric fields of somber purples, greens and reds. Collectively, the figurative arrangements suggested a non-linear, primal story of interrelated, shifting mother, father and child roles. Discussing the large triptych The Arrival of Wild Gods (2022), Isabella Miller wrote that Ruznic evoked "the psychic space of pregnancy" and interiority of the womb—"a liminal zone of maternal experience that plunged the viewer into an interdependent space characterized by the overlapping boundaries between self and other."

In the 2024 exhibitions, "The World Doesn't End" and "Mutter" ("mother" in German), Ruznic presented bodies of work that reconciled bleak and catastrophic realities with intimations of perseverance and continuity (e.g., Azmira & Maja, 2023–24). The paintings in the former show featured imagery centered on eyes and vision—suggesting the bearing of witness to loss and absence—as well as joyful, interconnected figurative groupings. John Vincler observed of this work, "Rather than existing between two states [abstraction and figuration], Ruznic creates an alternate one, simultaneously recognizable and uncanny. Hers is an emotionally charged dreamworld made material, which … grows more engaging, complex, and inhabitable the longer you look."

== Collections ==
Ruznic's work belongs to the permanent art collections of the Berkeley Art Museum and Pacific Film Archive, Crocker Art Museum, Dallas Museum of Art, Espoo Museum of Modern Art (EMMA) in Finland, Harwood Museum of Art, He Art Museum in China, Jiménez–Colón Collection, Museum of Fine Arts, Boston, Musée d’Art Moderne de Paris, Portland Art Museum, San Francisco Museum of Modern Art, and Whitney Museum, among others.
