= Lotus L. Kang =

Canadian artist (born 1985)

- Born: 1985 (age 40–41); Toronto, Canada
- Known for: Photography, sculpture, installation art
- Website: lotuslkang.com

Lotus L. Kang (born 1985) is a Canadian photographer, sculptor, and installation artist. She is best known for her installation works involving large sheets of unfixed or unprocessed photographic paper or film, often installed along with sculptural objects and greenhouses.

Kang participated in the Whitney Biennial in 2024 and has been awarded a Guggenheim Fellowship.

== Early life and education ==
Born in 1985 in Toronto, Kang's parents are both Korean. Kang's paternal grandmother fled North Korea with her children, settling in Seoul before the Korean War.

Kang attended Concordia University in Montreal, graduating with a BFA. She earned an MFA from Bard College in New York's Hudson Valley in 2015. She moved to Toronto after graduation.

== Life and career ==
=== 2010s ===
Kang staged a solo exhibition in 2017 titled Line Litter at Franz Kaka gallery in Toronto. In the basement gallery space, Kang installed a large curvy vertical sculptured metal armature that she used to display a series of x-ray images of human vertebrae made on flesh-toned photographic paper that had been exposed to light.

In 2018, in conjunction with Toronto's CONTACT Photography Festival, Kang opened a solo show at Gallery TPW, where she presented a two-room installation titled A Body Knots. The first room featured several metal mixing bowls on the floor filled with colored silicone that contained cast aluminum replicas of food and objects. In the second room, Kang installed new vertical metal armatures from which she suspended lengths of duratrans transparency paper on one side and lengths of unprocessed photo paper on the other. Kang used various photography processing chemicals to create abstract patterns and brush strokes on the unprocessed paper. The same year, she presented the installation work Channeler at the gallery Interstate Projects in Brooklyn. The piece consisted of a curved metal wall hung with skin-like lengths of photo paper alternating along both sides of the piece, along with sculptural objects including a plastic bag full of colored silicone.

Kang participated in the group exhibition Formula 1: A Loud, Low Hum in 2019 at the CUE Art Foundation in New York. She installed a new large curved metal armature and photo paper work titled Involution, consisting of a curved wall-like form with unprocessed photo paper attached via magnetic metal balls.

=== 2020s ===
In early 2020, Kang participated in an artist residency at the Banff Centre where she created a series of large-format photogram works titled Her Own Devices. The series includes 35 photograms, the age Kang was when creating the works, all of which feature the photographic outlines of woven or netted produce and firewood bags against coral, pink, and red backgrounds. After the residency in Banff, Kang staged a solo exhibition at the nonprofit Oakville Galleries in Oakville, Ontario, titled Beolle after a Korean term for worm. The show featured several large installation works like Mother, made of dozens of metal mixing bowls with small abstract clay, rubber, and stone sculptures scattered in and among the bowls, along with aluminum casts of fruit and anchovies. She also presented Molt, a room filled with lengths of unfixed photographic paper and photographic films laid out like mats over the floor with various small sculptures strewn around, all exposed to light so the sheets changed colors as the exhibition progressed. Kang exhibited the Her Own Devices series along with several other sculptural works - including installations of onion skins filled with silicone or sand placed on the gallery floor - in June 2020 at Franz Kaka in Toronto. During the COVID-19 pandemic, Kang lived in Toronto and began studying in a program for traditional Chinese medicine and acupuncture.

Kang participated in the 2021 New Museum Triennial in New York where she installed Great Shuttle. The work consisted of a tall metal scaffolding structure that split the gallery in two, paneled with unfixed photo paper that visually changed throughout the exhibition. The same year, she opened Earth Surge, a solo show at Helena Anrather gallery in New York, where she presented another work comprising metal mixing bowls filled with colored silicone and cast metal objects.

After around two years of studying Chinese medicine, Kang left the program and moved to New York full time. In 2022, Kang began to add a new process to her works involving sheets of film, working in greenhouses to treat the film before using it in installations. Kang developed a process of exposing the sheets to the light of a greenhouse setting, which she calls "tanning" the film. Also in 2022, Kang was the inaugural artist-in-residence at the Horizon Art Foundation in Los Angeles, where she lived and worked for several months. She iterated on and expanded her installation piece Mother during her time at Horizon.

Kang mounted a solo show in March 2023 titled In Cascades at the Chisenhale Gallery (Note: In Cascades was co-commissioned by the Chisenhale Gallery along with the Contemporary Art Gallery, Vancouver, where the show traveled after closing in the U.K.) in London. In April 2023, Kang was invited to exhibit in the Museum of Contemporary Art Chicago's atrium gallery. She installed a modified version of her work Molt, with the lengths of photo film hanging from the atrium's tall ceilings. In February 2024, Kang participated in the Los Angeles edition of the Frieze Art Fair with the gallery Commonwealth and Council.

In March 2024, Kang was included in the 2024 Whitney Biennial, Even Better than the Real Thing, curated for the museum by Chrissie Iles and Meg Onli. She showed a third modified version of her unfixed photo film installation In Cascades, presented in its own gallery in the exhibition. Several critics praised Kang's work as a highlight of the show. (Note: Critics who positively reviewed Kang's work in the Biennial include Jason Farago in The New York Times, Rachel Wetzler in Artforum, Nadja Sayej in the Observer, Sebastian Smee in The Washington Post, and Xenia Benivolski in Texte zur Kunst.) Around the same time, Kang began using greenhouses in her installation works, placing various sculptures, "tanned" photographic films, and other objects inside greenhouses installed in a gallery. She showed her first greenhouse work in the Greater Toronto Art triennial exhibition at the city's Museum of Contemporary Art, in March 2024.

Kang was awarded a Guggenheim Fellowship in April 2024 to support her work. In September, she staged a solo show titled Azaleas at Commonwealth and Council in Los Angeles. In December, The New York Times named Kang one of ten "breakout stars" of 2024.

Kang mounted a solo exhibition in April 2025 at 52 Walker, an exhibition space in Manhattan's Tribeca neighborhood owned by David Zwirner Gallery. In addition to several greenhouse installations and lengths of "tanned" photographic film suspended from the gallery ceilings, she exhibited a film installation in the basement made with strips of film stretched around a rotating rotary dryer used in photographic processing. ARTnews named the show the 8th best exhibition in New York that year.
