= Carmen Winant =

American writer and visual artist

Carmen Winant (born 1983) is a United States writer and visual artist who explores representations of women through collage, mixed media and installation.

== Early life ==
Carmen Winant was born in 1983 in San Francisco, California. Raised by feminist parents, her mother played a pivotal role in shaping her understanding of feminism. When she went to UCLA to study art, she took classes on women’s history that helped her to form a sense of political identity as a feminist and as an artist. While at UCLA Winant also competed in track and field as a distance runner and participated in cross country. Her intense athleticism during college was described by her as being "quite an intense period in my life" She kept a meticulous log of her diet and exercise routine, creating a sense of hyper-awareness within her own body. This process led her to further explore the body and how it informed her understanding of feminism.

== Education and teaching career ==
Carmen Winant is an artist and educator who has contributed to academia through her teaching and leadership roles. She holds a Bachelor of Arts from the University of California, Los Angeles (2006), a Master of Fine Arts and a Master of Arts in Visual and Critical Studies from the California College of the Arts (2011) where she studied with the photographer Larry Sultan. She previously taught at the Columbus College of Art and Design in Columbus, Ohio. In August 2018, Winant was appointed as the inaugural Roy Lichtenstein Chair of Studio Art at Ohio State University, where she also serves as a professor in the Department of Art.

Beyond her primary faculty position, she is affiliated with the Women's, Gender, and Sexuality Studies program and has actively participated in the Ohio Prison Education Exchange Project, teaching courses within Ohio correctional institutions. Prior to her tenure at Ohio State, Winant served as the Dean at the Skowhegan School of Painting and Sculpture from 2013 to 2015. Her teaching philosophy emphasizes the integration of critical theory with practical artistic application, fostering an environment where students are encouraged to explore innovative visual narratives and engage deeply with contemporary art practices.

== Artistic career ==
Carmen Winant is known for recontextualizing archival imagery into assembled compositions that address themes of gender, reproduction, and identity. Her work often incorporates found images and personal photographs to create immersive installations and artist books that challenge conventional representations of the female body. For example, in her installation and subsequent artist’s book, My Birth (2018), Winant's large-scale collage presents a mosaic of clippings of women's figures and bodies, using thousands of archival images of childbirth to critique the absence of birthing narratives in mainstream art and to prompt dialogue around reproductive politics.

In addition to her installations, Winant’s publication Instructional Photography: Learning How to Live Now (2021) outlines her innovative approach to using photography as a tool for both instruction and personal exploration. Her art practice, deeply rooted in archival research and feminist theory, has been exhibited internationally, including at major institutions like the Museum of Modern Art. In 2019, she was awarded a Guggenheim Fellowship in Photography, underscoring her status as a significant figure in contemporary art, and was featured in the 2024 Whitney Biennial at the Whitney Museum of American Art.

== Solo exhibitions ==
- 2016: Pictures of Women Working, Skibum MacArthur, Los Angeles, CA.
- 2016: Who Says Pain is Erotic?, Fortnight Institute, New York, NY.
- 2018: My Birth, Museum of Modern Art, New York, NY
- 2020: Togethering, Fortnight Institute, New York City.
- 2021: The Making and Unmaking of the World, Patron Gallery, Chicago, IL
- 2022: The Neighbor, The Friend, The Lover, Gävle Konstcentrum, Stockholm, Sweden
- 2022: Passing On, Cleveland Museum of Art, Cleveland, OH

== Group exhibitions ==
- 2021: Reproductive: Health, Fertility, Agency, The Museum of Contemporary Photography, Chicago, IL
- 2022: Maternar, University Museum of Contemporary Art, Mexico City, Mexico
- 2022: To Begin Again: Artists and Childhood, Institute of Contemporary Art, Boston, MA
- 2022: Breaking Water, Contemporary Arts Center, Cincinnati, Ohio.
- 2022: The Answer is Matriarchy, Wexner Center for the Arts, Columbus, OH
- 2024: Whitney Biennial, 2024: Even Better Than The Real Thing, Whitney Museum of American Art, New York, NY.

== Publications ==
- My Birth, Ithaca, NY: SPBH Editions, 2018.
- Notes on Fundamental Joy, Printed Matter Inc., 2019
- Instructional Photography: Learning How To Live Now, Printed Matter, 2021.
- A Brand New End: Survival and Its Pictures, The Print Center, 2022
- Arrangements, SPBH Editions, 2022

== Recognition ==
In 2019, Winant was awarded a Guggenheim Fellowship in photography, which is given to those "who have demonstrated exceptional capacity for productive scholarship or exceptional creative ability in the arts." In 2020, she was recognized as an FCA (Foundation for Contemporary Arts) Artist Honoree, and in 2021, she was an American Academy of Arts and Letters award recipient.

Awards

- 2019: Guggenheim Fellowship in Photography, New York, NY
- 2020: Foundation for Contemporary Arts Artist Honoree, New York, NY
- 2021: American Academy of Arts and Letters award, New York, NY
