= Margaret Honda =

Margaret Honda (born 1961) is an American experimental filmmaker and artist based in California. She began her career in sculpture before turning to film.

== Early life and education ==
Honda was born and raised in San Diego, California. She received a degree in Art History from the University of California, San Diego in 1984. In 1991, she earned an MA from the Winterthur Program in Early American Culture at the University of Delaware.

== Work ==
Honda's work in both visual art and film deals specifically with materials and their intended and incidental purposes, an interest she attributes in part to her academic studies in material culture.

Honda's work often incorporates biographical content and reflections. Her 2015 installation at Triangle France, titled Sculptures, recreated to scale all 15 of the artist studios she maintained over the course of her career. Writing in Mousse Magazine, Tenzing Barshee notes that, in keeping with Honda's "nonlinear and atemporal approach to history," her use of biographical elements "do[es] not stem from a project of nostalgia but rather from an active engagement with historicity, continuously interweaving different points in time to produce work infused with the present."

Her first film, Spectrum Reverse Spectrum (2014), was made without use of a camera by exposing 70mm print stock to precisely calibrated colored light. Artforum critic Nick Pinkerton writes, "Running the length of a single reel of wide-gauge stock, the film follows exactly the eponymous trajectory, chameleonically transitioning across the visible light spectrum, from violet to red and back again, beginning and ending in black. The simple effect, achieved using a contact film printer, is something like a prismatic sunset in a distant galaxy ... [.]" The feature-length Color Correction (2015) was made using the timing tapes that corrected the color for an unidentified Hollywood feature. Both films, along with Wildflowers (2015) (a film shot on expired Kodachrome that came back from the lab without images, only fields of light), concern the materiality of celluloid film and processes involved in its exposure, resulting in works that slowly evolve an awareness of the uses and unintended consequences of light in the filmmaking process.

Writings (2015), co-published by Triangle France and Künstlerhaus Bremen, is a collection of Honda's descriptions of her work.

== Exhibitions ==
Honda's work has been shown at Kunstverein Leipzig; Carnegie Museum of Art; Künstlerhaus Bremen; Triangle France, Marseille; Los Angeles County Museum of Art, Los Angeles; Hammer Museum, Los Angeles; PØST, Los Angeles; The Drawing Center, New York; and the Museum of Contemporary Art, Los Angeles. Her films have screened at Centre Pompidou, Paris, France; Cinémathèque française, Paris, France; Harvard Film Archive, Cambridge, Massachusetts; RedCat, Los Angeles, California; BFI London Film Festival; Toronto International Film Festival; the Museum of the Moving Image, New York; and the International Film Festival, Berlin.

== Collections ==
Honda's work is in the collections of the Carnegie Museum of Art, Pittsburgh, Pennsylvania; Frac Lorraine, Metz, France; Long Beach Museum of Art, Long Beach, California; Museum of Contemporary Art, Los Angeles; Museum of Contemporary Art, San Diego, California; Museum voor Moderne Kunst, Arnhem, The Netherlands; and Orange County Museum of Art, Newport Beach, California.

== Filmography ==
- Spectrum Reverse Spectrum, 2014
- Color Correction, 2015
- Wildflowers, 2015
- 6144 X 1024, 2018
- Equinox, 2020
