= Young Joon Kwak =

American artist and musician

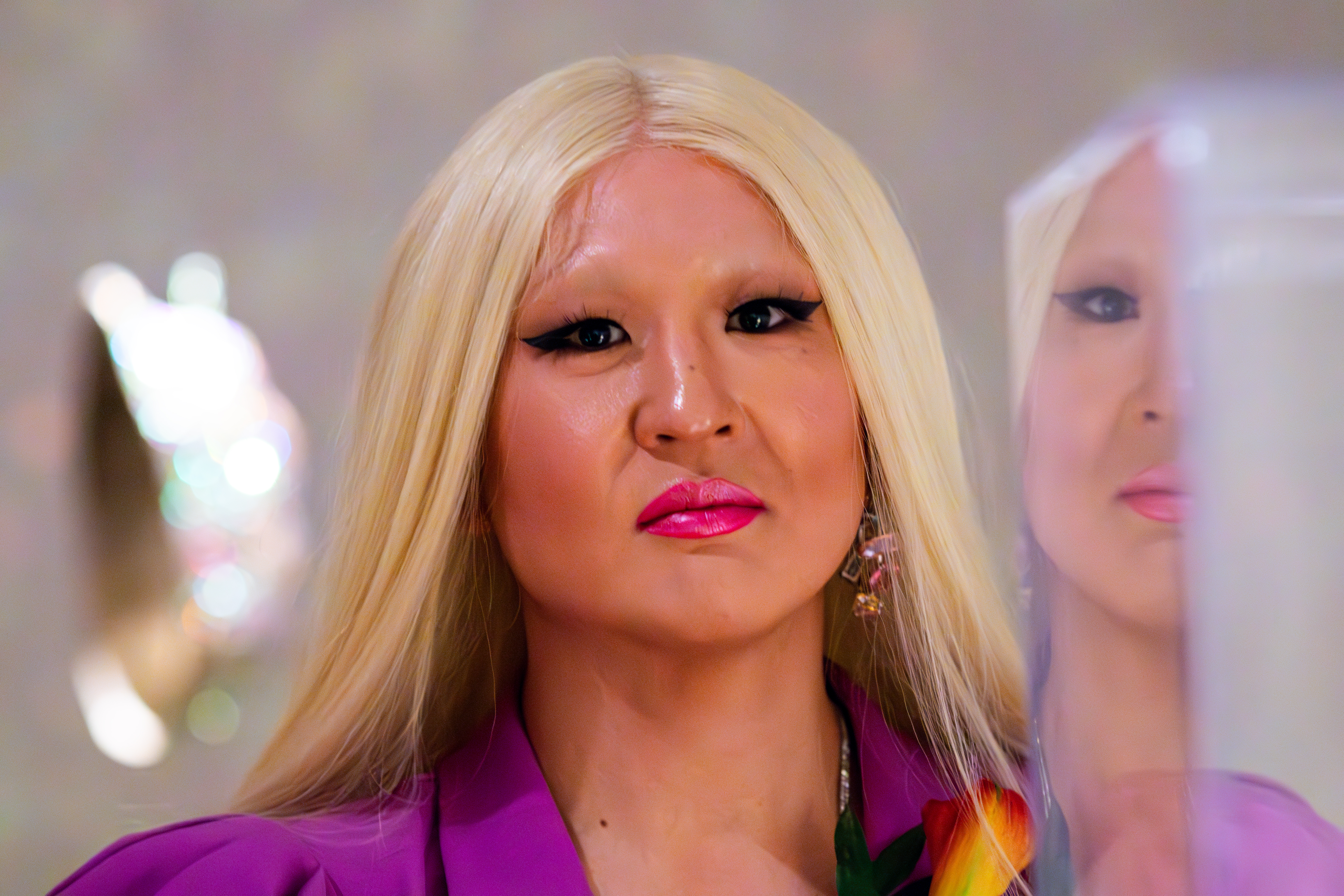
- Born: 1984; New York City
- Alma mater: University of Southern California; University of Chicago; School of the Art Institute of Chicago
- Occupation: Artist, musician
- Website: www.youngjoon.com

Young Joon Kwak (born 1984) is an American artist and musician based in Los Angeles. Much of their work focuses on queer bodies, how they have been represented in art history, and how they form communities. They have exhibited and performed at art museums around the world. Kwak is the lead singer in the band Xina Xurner, and a founding member of the collective Mutant Salon.

== Early life and education ==
Kwak was born in Queens, New York. Kwak received an MFA from the University of Southern California, MA in Humanities from the University of Chicago, and BFA from the School of the Art Institute of Chicago.

== Work ==
=== Sculpture ===
Kwak's sculptural work has been exhibited locally and internationally. They have described their work as investigating “traditional patriarchal standards of beauty in relation to the history of white supremacy, imperialism, and current social justice issues.” Their sculptures often consist of amorphous bodily forms made out of plaster, plastics, resin, metal, fiberglass, and lights. In a 2014 review for Hyperallergic Magazine, Alicia Eler wrote of Kwak's exhibition, "Young Joon Kwak’s work is neither binging nor representing — it is a purging, a releasing of one identity not necessarily for another, but for the continued evolution of the self in its variously emerging forms. The snake is free. She is a mutant alien being, continually evolving, a trans/feminine entity of force."

=== Mutant Salon ===
Mutant Salon was founded by Kwak in 2012 as a nomadic beauty salon, festive experimental performance event with their community of queer, trans, femme, POC, mutant, artists, and performers. The project has been a co-organized of Mutant Salon with Marvin Astorga, Sarah Gail Armstrong, Project Rage Queen, and Alli Miller. In the summer of 2018 Mutant Salon held a residency at Los Angeles Contemporary Exhibitions. As part of the exhibition they exhibited anonymous genital sculptures on loan from the ONE National Gay & Lesbian Archives, and a trio of extravagant wigs from Hollywood Wigs, a neighboring store on Hollywood Blvd. Mutant Salon has also taken place at numerous sites including the Broad Museum where the group engaged the public throughout the museums galleries, as well as the public space outside the institution, and the Hammer Museum.

=== Xina Xurner ===
Kwak is half of the electronic-dance-noise band Xina Xurner with Marvin Astorga. They are the lead singer of the band, and use heavily distorted vocals

== Grants and awards ==
Kwak is a recipient of the Trellis Art Fund grant (2024); Artadia Los Angeles Award (2024), California Community Foundation Fellowship for Visual Artists (2022), the Korea Arts Foundation of America's Artist Award in 2020, Rema Hort Mann Foundation's Emerging Artist Grant in 2018, the Art Matters Grant in 2016. , and the Artist Community Engagement Grant (2016)

== Exhibition history ==
Kwak has exhibited at art galleries, museums, and DIY venues including: the Hammer Museum, The Broad, REDCAT, ONE National Gay & Lesbian Archives, in Los Angeles; Wattis Institute, Southern Exposure, San Francisco; Museum of Contemporary Art, Denver; Museum of Contemporary Art, Chicago; Antenna Space, Shanghai, China; Pavillon Vendôme Centre d’Art Contemporain, Clichy, France; the Art Museum of the National University of Colombia, Bogotá; and Walter Philips Gallery, Banff, Alberta, Canada. Kwak showed their installation "Resisterhood" at Leslie-Lohman Museum of Art In New York City.
