= Kiyan Williams =

American artist

- Born: Newark, New Jersey
- Education: Stanford University, Columbia University
- Website: http://www.kiyanwilliams.com/

Kiyan Williams is an American visual artist who works across sculpture, performance, and installation. By revisiting public sculpture and national symbols, Williams creates artworks that subvert dominant narratives of history, power, and American identity. Williams lives and works in Brooklyn, New York.

== Education ==
Kiyan Williams earned a BA with Honors from Stanford University and a MFA in Visual Arts from Columbia University.

== Artistic practice ==
Kiyan Williams is a multidisciplinary artist whose practice encompasses performance, sculpture, installation and media art, through which they subvert national symbols and traditional monumentality. The artist adopts everyday materials and unconventional methods to uproot the hegemonic narratives of domination that monuments typically celebrate. Embracing fragments and fissures, Williams’ works recall ancient ruins or relics in a state of decay. By making, unmaking, and remaking, the artist creates embodied works that both fill historical gaps and question power dynamics. Soil, in particular, is a recurring material and metaphor that Williams uses to delve into American history and identity, thus unearthing the historical and ongoing forces that have shaped, and tightly tied together, bodies and land.

== Exhibitions ==
Kiyan Williams' work has been presented in numerous museums and galleries, in the United States and worldwide, including group exhibitions at the MIT List Visual Arts Center, Cambridge, the Brooklyn Museum, New York, David Kordansky Gallery, Los Angeles, the Hirshhorn Museum, Washington, D.C., Socrates Sculpture Park, New York, and SculptureCenter, New York. In 2022, they presented a monumental sculpture in Brooklyn Bridge Park, commissioned by Public Art Fund.

=== Solo exhibitions ===
- A Past That Is Future Tense, Peres Projects, Milan, 2023
- A Crack Beneath the Weight of it All, Altman Siegel, San Francisco, 2023
- Hammer Projects: Kiyan Williams, Hammer Museum, Los Angeles, 2022
- Un/earthing, Lyles and King, New York, 2022
- Reaching Towards Warmer Suns, The Anderson Collection, Stanford University, Palo Alto, 2021
- something else (Variations on Americana), Recess Art, New York, 2020

=== Selected group exhibitions ===
- Whitney Biennial 2024: Even Better Than the Real Thing, Whitney Museum of American Art, New York, 2024
- Full and Pure: Body, Materiality, Gender, Green Family Art Foundation, Dallas, 2023
- Put It This Way: (Re)Visions of the Hirshhorn Collection, Hirshhorn Museum, Washington D.C., 2023
- Symbionts: Contemporary Artists and the Biosphere, MIT List Visual Arts Center, Cambridge, 2022
- Indisposable: Tactics for Care and Mourning, Ford Foundation Gallery, New York, 2022
- Black Atlantic, commissioned by Public Art Fund, Brooklyn Bridge Park, New York, 2022
- 52 Artists: A Feminist Milestone, curated by Amy Smith-Stewart, The Aldrich Contemporary Art Museum, Ridgefield, 2022
- How to Cook a Wolf, Center for Book Arts, New York, 2021
- Land Akin, Smack Mellon, New York, 2021
- Listening to the Unsaid, David Kordansky Gallery, Los Angeles, 2020
- In the Beginning: Media Art and History from the Hirshhorn’s Collection, Hirshhorn Museum, Washington D.C, 2020
- MONUMENTS NOW: Call and Response, Socrates Sculpture Park, New York, US
- Nobody Promised You Tomorrow: Art 50 Years After Stonewall, Brooklyn Museum, New York, 2019
- In Practice: Other Objects, SculptureCenter, New York, 2019

== Selected grants and residencies ==
Williams is the recipient of the Jerome Hill Artist Fellowship, Graham Foundation Grant, Franklin Furnace Fund, and Fountainhead Fellowship in Sculpture and Extended Media at Virginia Commonwealth University. Williams has been awarded residencies at Smack Mellon and BTFA.

== Selected talks and lectures ==
- Captcha: Dancing, Data, and Liberation: Rashaad Newsome, Kiyan Williams, Saidiya Hartman, Aimee Meredith Cox, Arthur Jafa, and Tavia Nyong'o in Conversation, Park Avenue Armory, New York, NY, 2022
- What the soil remembers: Kiyan Williams and Kathryn Yusoff, NYU GSAS Music Colloquium Series, New York University, New York, NY, 2021
- Art and Soil: Artist Talk with Kiyan Williams, Hirshhorn Museum and Sculpture Garden, Washington D.C., 2020
- Summer of Know: Kiyan Williams and Ericka Hart in Conversation, Guggenheim Museum, New York, NY, 2019
- Marlon Riggs & “No Regret”: Disclosure, Performativity, & Legacy: Kiyan Williams, Ni’Ja Whitson and Tavia Nyong’o In Conversation, The 8th Floor, New York, York, 2017
