= JJJJJerome Ellis =

Multimedia artist and musician

Jerome Ellis (born 1989), who goes by JJJJJerome Ellis, is a multimedia artist, musician, composer, writer, and performer. Their (Note: Ellis uses all pronouns. This article uses they/them pronouns for consistency.) work concerns disability, justice, temporality, and historical experience. The artist's dysfluency informs their practice. Ellis currently lives in Norfolk, Virginia.

Their debut album, The Clearing (2021), accompanied by a book, is described as a score of stuttering and an act of resistance against performative fluency.

== Awards and recognition ==
Ellis has been awarded a United States Artists Fellowship (2022), a Foundation for Contemporary Arts Grants to Artists Award (2022), and a Creative Capital Grant (2022). The artist received MacDowell residency Fellowships in 2019 and 2022.

== Exhibitions ==
Ellis is represented twice in the 2024 Whitney Biennial as a solo artist and a member of the People Who Stutter Create (PWSC) collective.

== Discography ==
- 2021 – The Clearing
- 2025 – Vesper Sparrow

== Books ==
- 2021 – The Clearing. New York: Wendy's Subway, 2021.
- 2023 – Aster of Ceremonies. Minneapolis: Milkweed Editions, 2023.
