= Sula Bermúdez-Silverman =

American artist

Sula Fay Bermudez-Silverman (born 1993) is an American multi-media artist based in Los Angeles.

== Biography ==
Sula Bermudez-Silverman was born in New York City in 1993 and raised in Los Angeles, California. In 2015, Bermudez-Silverman was an Honorary Artist-in-Residence at Project Row Houses in Houston, Texas. Afterward she would study at the Yale University School of Art, earning her MFA in Sculpture in 2018. Her first exhibition was at the University of Texas at Austin while she was still a student at Yale. Currently, Bermudez-Silverman lives and works in Los Angeles.

== Education ==
Sula Bermudez-Silverman earned her BA in Studio Art from Bard College in 2015, and a MFA in Sculpture at Yale University School of Art in 2018. She also studied at Central Saint Martin’s School of Art and Design in London in 2013.

== Artworks ==
Her artworks are mostly sculptures of various mediums, including sugar, found objects, and hair and has dabbled in video art. Her art primarily focuses on gender, pop culture, and post-colonialism Silverman deliberately leaves her artwork undescribed as for the viewer to find out what parts resonate with their identity. Many of her currently displayed works deal with economic, racial, religious, and gender dynamics in abstraction.

The following are examples of Sula Bermudez-Silverman's artworks:

- Tactile Illusions: Fabric book with printed imagery and tactile braille describing the image's texture.
- Duck Test: Video art depicting the braiding and burning of Silverman's hair.
- Artist's Hair and Wood: A wheel of Silverman's hair.
- Table for Eleggua, Table for Elijah: Various found and made items displayed accompanied by video art.
- Portraits of family members using DNA testing results: Fabric pie charts depicting the genetic "portrait" of the individual.
- Red Hook, New York: A transparent quilt containing various found items.
- Blue Prints: Fabric book with printed imagery.
- Dollhouses in the medium sugar, glass, wood, resin, and metal.
- Hair Embroideries: Fabrics with images sewn in from Silverman's hair.
- Carrefour Pietà / Be My Victim: wool and acrylic yarn.
- The Monster’s Bride (She’s Alive!): wool and viscose yarn.
- Porthole 3 (Chemical X): Himalayan sea salt, isomalt sugar, glass found object.
- Satan Arousing the Rebel Angels: isomalt sugar, epoxy resin, puffer fish specimen, cast glass, carpenter bees.

== Exhibitions ==
Solo exhibitions
| Exhibition | Organization | Location | Date |
|---|---|---|---|
| Sutures | University of Texas at Austin | Austin, Texas, United States | November 2, 2018 - December 7, 2018 |
| Neither Fish, Flesh, nor Fowl | California African American Museum | Los Angeles, California, United States | February 28, 2020 - May 2, 2021 |
| Sighs and Leers and Crocodile Tears | Murmurs | Los Angeles, California, United States | March 7, 2021 — April 10, 2021 |
