= Gabriela Ruiz =

Mexican-American artist

Gabriela Ruiz (born circa 1991), also known as Leather Papi, is a Mexican-American artist based in Los Angeles, California, who works primarily in sculpture and performance art.

== Biography ==
Gabriela Ruiz was born and raised in the San Fernando Valley, California. She attended Ulysses S. Grant High School in Van Nuys. Ruiz is a self-taught artist who broke into the art world through a friend, Ignacio “Nacho” Nava Jr., an organizer of "Mustache Mondays", a queer dance party/performance happenings which Ruiz frequented. Through this connection she began to establish herself, working in multiple disciplines including, fashion design, costuming, performance, sculpture, video, and social media. In her work, she speaks on her Latinx heritage, queer identity, and kink subcultures.

== Artwork ==
Throughout her work, Gabriela Ruiz explores the meaning of culture and identity through emotion. Her works include bold colors, casts of her own body, and electronic elements.

=== Haus ===
The Haus Show featured an interactive space based on the traditional rooms of a home (living room, bathroom, bedroom) as well as a dungeon. The exhibition showcased sculpture, video (a short film called Red is Dead created by Gabriela Ruiz and Derek Holguin), and a party hosted by Gabriela Ruiz herself.

=== A Cinderella Story of Everyday Objects ===
The A Cinderella Story of Everyday Objects was an installation in Mexico City. It contained several elements including projection mapping and video, live music and audio attachments, and suspended objects. This show took on the colors of yellows and oranges. The walls painted yellow, and the objects hung painted orange. The suspended items included two windows, a chandler, and a small bed, on the floor, a tiny television playing a video on loop. Ruiz also placed her self into the piece, at one point even crushing a eucharists with her head, until they were just crumbs on the floor.

=== Full of Tears ===
The Full of Tears exhibition was Ruiz's first solo exhibition. It is a self-portrait in the form of a large scale installation. The piece focuses on projection mapping and video, as well as cast sculptures of her body. Spaces were painted green, and each subject was cast in red in clashing colors to bring attention to the interior and exterior emotions.

== Exhibitions ==
=== Solo exhibitions ===
- 2019 Gabriela Ruiz: Full of Tears, Vincent Price Art Museum, Los Angeles, CA
- 2017 Haus, Little Tokyo Art Complex, Los Angeles, CA

=== Group Exhibitions ===
- 2026 Whitney Biennial, Whitney Museum of American Art, New York, NY.

=== Performances and collaborations ===
- 2020 X, OxyArts, Occidental College, Los Angeles, CA
- 2019 Empapada, CASTTL and Museum aan de Stroom, Antwerp, BE
- 2019 Hypanthium, REDCAT, In collaboration with Sebastian Hernandez, Los Angeles, CA
- 2018 Cruz Azul, Rafa Esparza: De La Calle at the Institute of Contemporary Art, Los Angeles, CA
- 2018 Red is Dead, Live Artists Live Performance Program, USC Roski School of Art and Design, Los Angeles, CA Organized as part of Pacific Standard Time Festival: Live Art LA/LA
