= Jordan Strafer =

American artist and filmmaker

Jordan Strafer (b. Miami, FL, 1990) is an American artist and filmmaker.

Using video, film, installation, handmade props, and drawing, Jordan Strafer reveals the mechanisms of power and societal dysfunction.

Her art involves telling stories about her and her family while connecting it to important questions of racial identity, gender, and "Americanism"

== Early life and education ==
Strafer was born in Miami, Florida, USA. She holds a BA in Media Studies from The New School's Eugene Lang College of Liberal Arts (New York, USA), a BFA in Visual Art from Parsons School of Design (New York, USA), and an MFA in Film/Video from Bard College's Milton Avery Graduate School of the Arts (New York, USA).

== Career ==
=== Film festivals ===
- New York Film Festival (2024), No Spank
- International Film Festival Rotterdam (2024), LOOPHOLE
- New York Film Festival (2023), LOOPHOLE
- New York Film Festival (2022), PEAK HEAVEN LOVE FOREVER

=== Filmography ===
- DECADENCE, writer and director (2024)
- No Spank, writer and director (2024)
- LOOPHOLE, writer and director (2023)
- MERCY NO NO, writer and director (2023)
- PEAK HEAVEN LOVE FOREVER, writer and director (2022)
- SOS, writer and director (2021)
- PEP (Process Entanglement Procedure), writer and director (2019)
- Judy Smolak: Lifestyle, Ideas, Family, Biography & Net-Worth, writer and director (2020)
