= Michael Jackson: On the Wall =

2018 art exhibition

Michael Jackson: On the Wall was an exhibition that explored the influence of Michael Jackson on some of contemporary art's leading names. The exhibition included contemporary artists’ interpretations of Michael Jackson in more than 100 works of art. The featured 48 artists spanned several generations across all media. The list includes established international artists Andy Warhol and Isa Genzken, to Kehinde Wiley, and Jordan Wolfson. The National Portrait Gallery in London partnered with the Michael Jackson Estate to produce the exhibition. Dr. Nicholas Cullinan was the show's director. Private collectors from around the world loaned the art pieces for the show, which also included new works made especially for Michael Jackson: On the Wall.

What would have been Michael Jackson's 60th birthday in the summer of 2018, marked the opening of the exhibition in London. The exhibition toured the Grand Palais in Paris; the Bundeskunsthalle in Bonn, Germany; and EMMA – Espoo Museum of Modern Art in Helsinki, Finland. The Embassy of the United States in Helsinki, the Romanian Cultural Institute in Stockholm, and the Embassy of Romania to Finland have all supported the exhibition that also included a hardcover catalog with essays by Margo Jefferson, Zadie Smith, and Nicholas Cullinan.

The Michael Jackson: On the Wall, exhibition ranks second on the list of most popular exhibitions throughout EMMA's history, when comparing the total amount of visitors.
