= Dionne Lee =

American photographer (born 1988)

- Born: 1988 (age 37–38)
- Education: California College of the Arts
- Occupation: Photographer

Dionne Lee (born 1988) is an American photographer who works with film, collage, and video to explore ideas of power, survival, and history.

== Early life and career ==
Lee grew up in Harlem, New York. Lee has employed collage methods in her photography work, sometimes gluing together silver gelatin photographic negatives to create a new work. Her work is included in the collections of the Museum of Modern Art and the Museum of Fine Arts, Houston.

In 2010, Lee graduated with a BAFA of Fine Arts from Alfred University, and in 2017, earned a MFA from the California College of the Arts in San Francisco.

Lee was a 2025 Guggenheim fellow Lee is also an Assistant Professor of Art at The Ohio State University.

== Works ==
Lee's photography explores landscape as both a site of refuge as well as trauma. In her work, Lee explores her relationship to spaces by interrogating the history of places, as well as the role of the photographer and the purpose of the images. For example, Lee grew up in Harlem and later learned the history of Seneca Village, a settlement of free Black Americans who were later forcibly removed from that site.

Lee is part of the inaugural cohort of artists invited to participate in Unseen California, a project that engages with artists to research and create site specific artworks on public lands in California.

In the soundtrack to "Companion Pieces: New Photography 2020", an internet based display at the Museum of Modern Art in New York, Lee says the pictures are a praise to her predecessors who explored North on the Underground Railroad. According to Nkgopoleng Moloi of Art in America, "The works bespeak Lee's advantage in investigating the body's relationship to the land, and in instruments that work with endurance in the wild, a capacity pertinent to both social history and environmental change."

One of Lee's main works is True North, which is exhibited in her Museum of Modern Art collection. This piece explores the artists relationship to the natural world. In North and True North, Lee pictures her hands in a gesture used in the northern hemisphere to locate the North Star. She shows us how the body can be used as a tool—here, a compass. She also considers north as an aspirational destination for people fleeing enslavement in the southern United States, reflecting that her own ancestors may have "held their body in that same position." By performing this gesture, she calls back to them.

== Major exhibitions ==
Some of Lee's major exhibitions include Trap and Lean To at Light Work in Syracuse, NY , Continuum: Aspen Mays + Dionne Lee, Silver Eye Center for Photography, Pittsburgh, PA, 214 Surface Tension Exhibition in the 1980-today collection in the Museum of Modern art in New York and Running, rigging, wading, at the Interface Gallery in Oakland, CA.

== Public collections ==
Lee's work can be found in different public collections around the United States. Her work is featured in the Museum of Modern Art, New York, NY, New Orleans Museum of Art, New Orleans, LA, The Museum of Fine Arts Houston, Houston, TX, Princeton University Art Museum, Princeton, NJ, Florida State University Museum of Fine Arts, Tallahassee, FL, Light Work, Syracuse, NY, Center for Photography at Woodstock Collection at SUNY New Paltz, NY.
