= Downtown Arts Scene =

Artistic community in New York City

The Downtown Arts Scene was an artistic community based in Lower Manhattan, New York City.

Members of the Scene included Alvin Baltrop, Jackie Curtis, Jasper Johns, Trisha Brown and Philip Glass.

The Downtown arts scene used photocopying as a rapid way for artists to share and distribute images.

The Downtown Arts Scene is generally considered to have reached its end in the 1980s.
