= Ali Eyal =

Iraqi artist (born 1994)

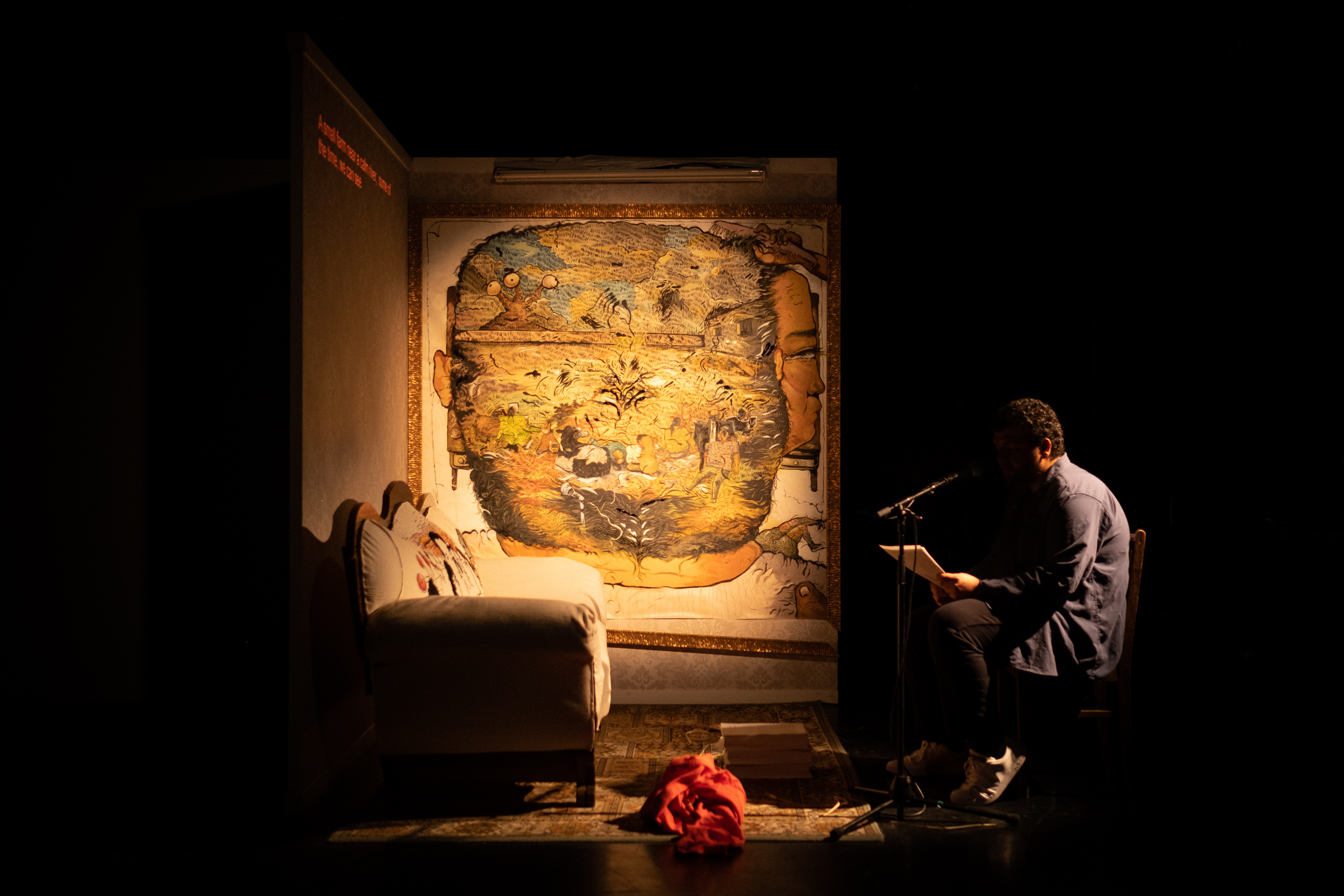
Ali Eyal performing in Frankfurt.

Ali Eyal, (Arabic: علي عيّال) (born April 28, 1994) is an Iraqi visual artist currently based in Los Angeles and works internationally. His work explores the complex relationships between personal history, transitory memories, politics, and identity. Primarily a painter, his work traverses different media including installations art, photography, text, and video.

== Biography ==
He lived first in Baghdad, Iraq, and then between Baghdad and Beirut. He left Iraq in 2017 and settled in the Netherlands in 2019. After diploma from the Institute of Fine Arts in Baghdad in 2015, he joined the residency in 2016/17 at HWP/Home Workspace, Independent Study Program in Ashkal Alwan, Beirut, Lebanon.

His research and work grounds war, violence, and occupation through stories, where characters are immersed in the land and trying to outwit its decline. The loss, ghosts and absence. And a small farm, like a mythical origin that was lost but every time he return in different new shapes in his works. His refusal to show his face for the past eight years. The absence of his image constitutes a dialogue with the missing persons, with the lost villages and destroyed houses, 'because a house is like a face too.'

In 2011, he was artist in residence in Sada for Contemporary Iraqi Art. In 2018, during the course of his residency in Beirut, developed two projects: "painting size 80 x 60" and "solo exhibition of landscapes." he spent time working on research paintings and writing on two projects about the image, painting, and idea of stolen lands. In 2019, he received a grants from Mophradat art fellows.

On February 10, 2026, the Hammer Museum announced that Eyal was awarded their Mohn Award honoring artistic excellence.

== Selected exhibitions ==
=== Group exhibitions ===
- 2022 Documenta 15 - Sada [regroup] | Kassel, DE.
- 2022 The 58th Carnegie International | Pittsburgh, US
- 2021 This Is Not Lebanon, Künstlerhaus Mousonturm | Frankfurt, DE
- 2021 Hands, The Akademie der Künste | Cologne, DE alongwith Dhali Al Mamoon
- 2020 How to reappear: Through the quivering leaves of independent publishing, MMAG Foundation, Amman, JO
- 2019 I am BP, King of Exploitation, King of Injustice, P21 Gallery, London, UK
- 2019 Viral Self-Portraits - Online exhibition, Museum of Contemporary Art Metelkova | +MSUM, Slovenia, LJU
- 2019 The 8th edition of Home Works: A Forum on Cultural Practices, Ashkal Alwan., Beirut, LB.
- 2019 How to maneuver: Shape-shifting texts and other publishing tactics, Warehouse 421, Abu Dhabi, UE
- 2019 How to reappear Through the quivering leafs of independent publishing. Beirut Art Center, Beirut, LB
- 2019 Theater of Operations: The Gulf Wars 1991–2011, MoMA PS1, NYC, US
- 2019 Sharjah Film Platform, Sharjah Art Foundation, Sharjah, UE
- 2019 Collective exhibition, Beirut Art Center. touché! (gestures, movement, action), Beirut, LB
- 2019 The 8th edition of Home Works: A Forum on Cultural Practices, Ashkal Alwan., Beirut, LB
- 2019 Kino, Bermondsey as part of VITRINE x Kino Screenings. London, UK
- 2018 Immaterial Collection Forum IV: States of Being, Beirut Art Center, Beirut, LB

== Collections ==
Kadist Kadist Art Foundation

Barjeel Art Foundation
