= Eamon Ore-Giron =

American artist

- Born: Eamon Ore-Giron; 1973 (age 52–53); Tucson, Arizona, US
- Occupations: Painting, time-based media, DJ
- Known for: Paintings
- Website: https://eamonoregiron.com/

Eamon Ore-Giron (born 1973) is an American visual artist based in Los Angeles, California. From 2004 to 2013, he was a member of the art collective OJO. He is a prolific artist who has exhibited at international venues, including the Whitney Biennial and Museum of Contemporary Art, Los Angeles.

== Biography ==
Eamon Ore-Giron was born 1973 in Tucson, Arizona, to Peruvian and Irish-American parents. He was raised in the southwestern United States and spent time in Spain, Peru and Mexico. Ore-Giron's primary medium is painting, but he works with video and music as well. He performs as his alter-ego DJ Lengua who incorporates global modernism into his work. In 2005, he co-founded the art collective OJO with visual artists Joshua Aster, Justin Cole, Chris Avitabile, Moises Medina, and Brenna Youngblood. OJO created immersive exhibits and performance art which experimented with musical improvisation, electronics, and pushing the boundaries between viewer and performer. They disbanded in 2013. Recently his work has taken on a flat painting style of geometric abstraction. His artwork is neat and focuses on cultural cross-fertilization. For the last decade, he has been losing the sight in his right eye, and attributes the change in his style to this vision issue. In 2020, he was named to the Presidential Residency at the Anderson Collection at Stanford University.

== Education ==
Eamon Ore-Giron attended the San Francisco Art Institute and received his Bachelor of Fine Arts in 1996. He completed his graduate work at the University of California, Los Angeles where he received his MFA in 2006.

== Artwork ==
Much of Ore-Giron's work is influenced by indigenous traditions, Russian Suprematism, Native American medicine wheels, Mexican muralism, Amazonian tapestries, European modernism, and Latin American Concrete art. He views his work as an outlet, in which he can show different realities of imagination and be able to reassess history.

He is a founding member of OJO, an audio performance group. He is also known by his musician name, DJ Lengua and has gained success in releasing two vinyl covers with Unicornio Records. He music focuses on Latin American electronic beats. Ore-Giron created a conceptual artwork inspired by Yaraví music in 2013, titled E-D-G-B-D-G.It is composed of copper chimes that form a musical scale in the manner of an open tuning system.

Ore-Giron has a series called Infinite Regress. This series started in 2015 and has continued to grow since then. It currently consist of 130 paintings that depict a variety of geometric shapes.

"Soft Power" is an exhibition at the San Francisco Museum of Modern Art that presented Eamon Ore-Giron "Infinite Regress LXXIV" painting. The painting demonstrated his unique and powerful use of color and shapes.

Ore-Giron was in the Whitney Biennial, 2024, reimagines gods from ancient Peruvian and Mexican cultures in his Talking Shit series. That collection includes three paintings, "Talking shit with Amaru (Wari)"2023, "Talking Shit with my jaguar face" 2024, and "Talking shit with Viracocha's Rainbow (Iteration I) 2023. The series title Talking Shit reflects the artist's intention to explore this idea and a live ancestral past in a friendly, informal, and personal way.

== Exhibitions ==
Solo exhibitions
| Date | Title | Gallery/Venue | Location | Ref |
|---|---|---|---|---|
| 2015 | Morococha | LAXART | Los Angeles, US | |
| 2013 | Smuggling The Sun | Nichelle Beauchene Gallery | New York, US | |
| 2012 | Open Tuning: E-D-G-B-D-G | 18th Street Arts Canter | Los Angeles, US | |
| 2010 | Road to Ruins | Steve Turner Contemporary | Los Angeles, US | |
| 2009 | Into A Long Punk | Steve Turner Contemporary | Los Angeles, US | |
| 2006 | Los Jaichackers | MUCA ROMA | Mexico City, Mexico | |
| 2005 | Mirage | Pennsylvania Academy of Fine Art | Philadelphia, USA | |

Group exhibitions
| Date | Title | Gallery/Venue | Location | Ref |
|---|---|---|---|---|
| 2019 | Soft Power | San Francisco Museum of Modern Art (SFMOMA) | San Francisco, US | |
| 2018 | Made in L.A. 2018 | Hammer Museum | Los Angeles, US | |
| 2017 | Figure Ground; Beyond the White Field | Whitney Museum of American Art | New York, US | |
| 2016 | Painters NYC | El Museo de los Pintores Oaxaquenos (MUPO) | Oaxaca, Mexico | |
| 2015 | Something Else | Off Biennial | Cairo, Egypt | |
| 2014 | Notes For Now | Prospect 3 New Orleans | New Orleans, US | |
| 2013 | Night Shade/ Solanaceae | Perez Art Museum of Miami | Miami, US | |
| 2012 | Going Public- Telling it as it is? | ENPAP | Bilbao, Spain | |
| 2010 | Lonarte | Municipality of Calheta | Madeira, Portugal | |
| 2010 | Panorama: Los Angeles | ARCO | Madrid, Spain | |
| 2009 | Engagement Party | Museum of Contemporary Art | Los Angeles, US | |
| 2008 | Phantom Sightings: Art After the Chicano Movement | Los Angeles County Museum of Art, Museo Tamayo Arte Contemporaneo, The Museo Alameda, Phoenix Art Museum, Museo de Arte de Zapopan, El del Barrio | Los Angeles, US Texas, US Mexico City, Mexico New York, US | |
| 2006 | Glitch | LACMA | Los Angeles, US | |
| 2005 | Technical Breakdown | Cinemateket | Copenhagen, Denmark | |
| 2002 | Bay Area Now 3 | Yerba Buena Center For The Arts | San Francisco, US | |
| 2001 | Widely Unknown | Deitch Projects | New York, US | |
| 2024 | Whitney Biennial, 2024: Even Better Than The Real Thing | Whitney Museum of American Art | New York, US | |

== Collections ==
Eamon Ore-Giron's work is in the permanent collection of UCLA Hammer Museum, the Art in Embassies United States Consulate General Nuevo Laredo, Los Angeles County Museum of Art, Museum of Fine Arts in Boston, Pennsylvania Academy of the Fine Arts, San Francisco Museum of Modern Art, and Pérez Art Museum Miami

== Honors and awards ==
Eamon Ore-Giron was awarded 2020-2021 Presidential Residency for the Future of the Arts.

== Publications ==
Eamon Ore-Giron created a book called Infinite Regress, that was published in March 2020 by Bom Dia Boa Tarde Boa Noite. The book shows his series of Infinite Regress paintings and poetry from Edgar Garcia.
