= Jes Fan =

Contemporary artist

Jes Fan is an artist born in Canada and raised in Hong Kong, currently based in Brooklyn, New York. Their work looks at the intersection of biology and identity, and explores otherness, kinship, queerness and diasporic politics. Fan has exhibited in the United States, UK, Hong Kong, and others.

== Early life and education ==
Fan grew up in Hong Kong after being born in Canada shortly after their parents immigrated in 1989.

Fan holds a Bachelor of Fine Arts in Glass from Rhode Island School of Design (RISD) and their current studio practice and residence is in Brooklyn, NY.

== Work ==
Fan is a multidisciplinary artist who creates sculptures that feature hormones, bacteria, and fungi, with the aim of exploring and challenging the concepts of identity and biology. Fan has exhibited their art in galleries across the world, including in Australia, the United Kingdom, New York, and Hong Kong.

In a review of Fan's work, contemporary art periodical Artforum states:

"Above all, (Fan's) sculptures were promiscuously biomorphic, resembling molecules, organs, orifices, skin, bodies of all kins--wringling forms of life that refuse any single definition."

Online contemporary art broker Artsy has commented that:

"Fan's desire is to obfuscate the difference between hard and soft, asking us to quantify and justify our sense of queerness as a limp thing. It's a conceptual question for the viewer: How soft must a masculine object get to become feminine?"

Fan has been featured in an ongoing series of short interviews for PBS's Art21 in their New York Closeup series. In 'Infectious Beauty', their second short following Fan, Art21 followed the artist in the production of their sculpture for the 2019 Socrates Sculpture Biennial, ‘what eye no see, no can do’, a series of interconnecting metal rods and slumping fiberglass bodies.

A more recent series of Fan’s entitled 'Sites of Wounding' focuses on pearl farming as a way to expose extractive industries. For this work they worked with Pinctada fucata, an oyster species native to Hong Kong which is subject to commercial industrial pearl cultivation. A work in this series entitled Mother of Pearl (2020-2022) explores the feeling of not belonging, as well as internalized trauma. Working with oysters, Fan carves into the pearls they carry within—representative of Hong Kong via its colonial nickname, “Pearl of the Orient”—and leaves them for a period of time to observe how they adapt to survive, showing how beauty can occur at sites of wounding.

In Fan's series 'Sites of Wounding: The Interchapter', they explore the intersection of biology and identity to demonstrate how biological components which are often unseen at sub-macroscopic scales, such as melanin and hormones, can contribute to formative experiences. They emulate this by using soy, which is considered androgynous as it is used in manufacturing of both pharmaceutical estrogen and testosterone, which are widely viewed to be the "feminine" and "masculine" hormones, respectively. The soy is cultivated into yuba (soy skin), which Fan drapes over aluminum basins. It is used as a symbol of resilience, as soy crops are highly resistant to disease and invasion.

In 2024, Fan participated in an exhibition held at Whitney Museum of American Art that featured four of their sculptures. The sculptures were created by 3D printing CAT scans of his own body and hand-blowing glass to mimic organs. 'Cross Section (Leg Muscle III)' and 'Cross Section (Leg Muscle II)' utilize scans of his knee and hip muscle. 'Contrapposto' showcases his vertebrate and a metal framework acting as a skeleton. These sculptures were made to resemble Aquilaria sinensis, a tree from Hong Kong which heals itself with resin when injured.

== List of exhibitions ==
=== Solo exhibitions ===
- Sites of Wounding: Chapter 2, M+, Hong Kong
- Sites of Wounding: Chapter 1, Empty Gallery, Art Basel, Hong Kong (2023)
- Mother is a Woman, Empty Gallery, Hong Kong (2018)
- No Clearance in Niche, Museum of Arts and Design, New York (2017)
- Disposed to Add, Vox Populi Gallery, Philadelphia (2017)
- Ot(her), Sarah Doyle Gallery, Brown University, Rhode Island (2016)
- Unbounded, Yale University Art Gallery, Yale University (2026)

=== Selected group exhibitions ===
- Even Better than the Real Thing, Whitney Museum (2024)
- Weight of Mind, CCS Bard (2024)
- The Milk of Dreams, Venice Biennale, Venice, Italy (2022)
- Soft Water, Hard Stone, New Museum Triennial, New York (2022)
- The Stomach and The Port, Liverpool Biennale, England, (2021)
- Kiss My Genders, Hayward Gallery at Southbank Art Center, London (2019)
- An Opera for Animals, Rockbund Art Museum, Shanghai (2 Jun – 25 Aug 2019)
- In my room, Antenna Space, Shanghai (24 May – 7 Jul 2019)
- SportCult, Team Gallery, NYC (6 Dec 2018 – 19 Jan 2019)
- Paradox: The Body in the Age of AI, Miller ICA, Carnegie Mellon University (5 Oct 2018 – 3 Feb 2019)
- Glass Ceiling, UrbanGlass, New York (2017)
- In Search of Miss Ruthless, Para Site, Hong Kong (2017)

== Awards and residencies ==
=== Awards and grants ===
- Pollock Krasner Grant 2023
- Gold Art Prize 2022
- NYSCA/NYFA Fellowship (Sculpture/Craft) 2020
- Jerome Hill Fellowship 2019-2020
- Joan Mitchell Painters and Sculptors Grant 2017
- Edward and Sally Van Lier Fellowship at Museum of Arts and Design (MAD)
- CCGA Fellowship at Wheaton Arts
- John A. Chironna Memorial Award at RISD

=== Residencies ===
- Pollock-Krasner Foundation Grant (2022)
- Smack Mellon Artist Studio Program in Brooklyn (2019)
- Para Site in Hong Kong (2017)
- Recess Art Session Artist in Residence
- Bemis Center for Contemporary Arts Residency
- RISD Glass (2017)
- Pioneer Works (2017)
- Spring Workshop in Hong Kong
