= Jasmin Sian =

Filipino-American artist

- Born: 1969; Leyte, Philippines
- Education: Parsons School of Design
- Known for: Works on paper

Jasmin Sian is an artist who creates work using recycled materials, often reusing brown paper bags or other single use objects. Her work creates images by punching holes through these recycled materials.

Earlier in her career, she combined pigment, gold thread, hand-drawn arabesques and collaged bits of fabric. Her works have always been at a miniature scale.

Jasmin Sian has worked in Howardena Pindell's studio for over 20 years.

== Public collections ==
Sian is included in the collections of the Art Institute of Chicago, Chicago, IL and the Fogg Art Museum, Cambridge, MA.

== Awards ==
Jasmin Sian was awarded an MFA Grant from the Joan Mitchell foundation in 1998.
