= Espoo Museum of Modern Art =

Art museum in Espoo in southern Finland

EMMA – Espoo Museum of Modern Art
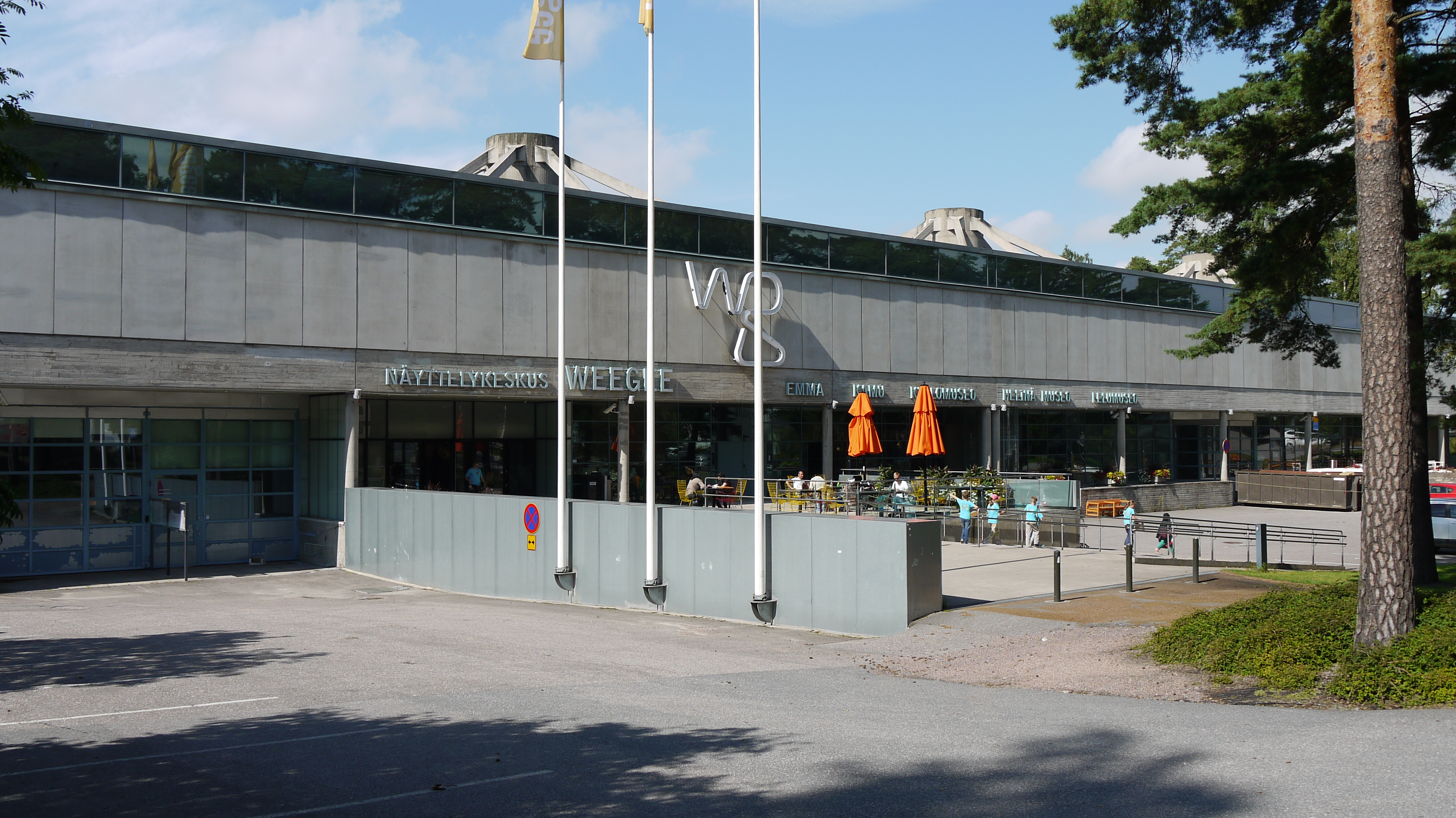
- EMMA from the outside
- Interactive fullscreen map
- Location: Espoo, Finland
- Coordinates: 60°10′44″N 24°47′39″E

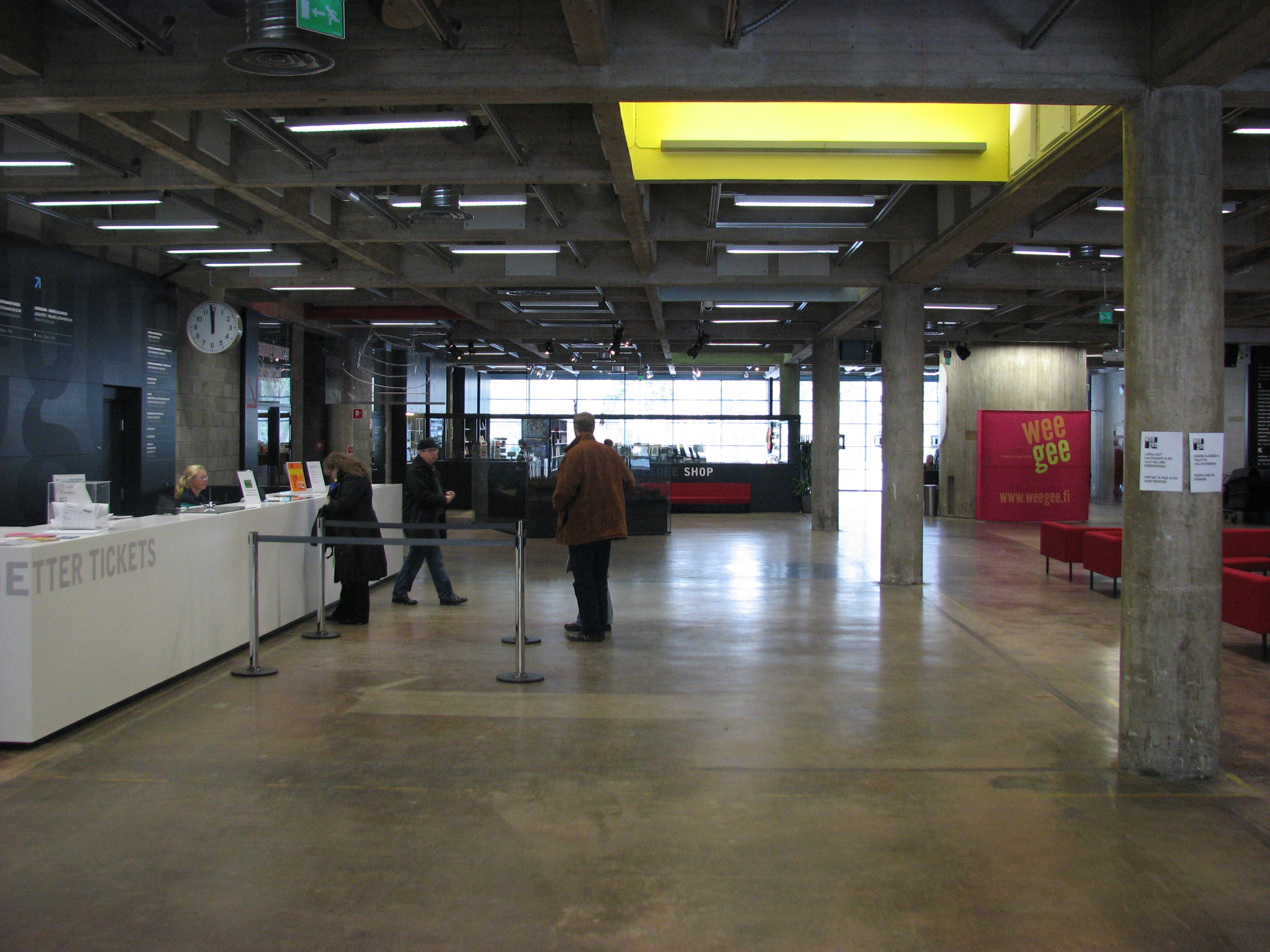
EMMA from the inside

The EMMA – Espoo Museum of Modern Art (Finnish: EMMA - Espoon modernin taiteen museo, Swedish: EMMA - Esbo moderna konstmuseum), is a major art museum in Espoo in southern Finland. After the founding of Espoo Art Museum Foundation in September 2002, EMMA opened its doors for visitors in 2006. With its 5000 square metre exhibition space, it is the largest museum in the whole of Finland. The permanent exhibition presents a selection from The Saastamoinen Foundation Art Collection and the other half the changing domestic and international exhibitions.

It is housed in the WeeGee house, a building complex which contains five museums, a modern art gallery, a media-art centre, a café, a museum shop and an art school. The centre was named after the printing firm Weilin+Göös.

== History ==
The City of Espoo founded the Espoo Art Museum Foundation in 2002. EMMA was opened to the public on October 13, 2006, after the renovation of the WeeGee building was completed.

EMMA is located in the architecturally significant WeeGee building, designed by Professor Aarno Ruusuvuori. EMMA's approximately 5,000 m² of exhibition space is located on the 1st and 2nd floors of the building. In addition to Collection Kakkonen and the collections of the Saastamoinen Foundation and the Tapio Wirkkala Rut Bryk Foundation, the exhibition spaces feature changing Finnish and international exhibitions of modern and contemporary art, as well as design.

The Saastamoinen Foundation Art Collection was deposited into EMMA's collections when the art museum was founded, and the foundation's collection exhibition is permanently on display at the museum. The collection contains over 2,800 works, of which about 150 are on display at a time. The exhibition space also includes a media art space equipped with 4K technology for showcasing the media art pieces from the collection.

Founded in 2003, the Tapio Wirkkala Rut Bryk Foundation cherishes the artistic legacy of Rut Bryk and Tapio Wirkkala. A deposit agreement was signed between the foundation and EMMA, transferring over 3,000 objects owned by the foundation into the museum's administration. This includes artworks, industrial art objects, prototypes, and archival material. In November 2015, the City of Espoo, the EMMA Museum, and the Tapio Wirkkala Rut Bryk Foundation signed an agreement to permanently place the foundation's collection in the premises of the WeeGee Exhibition Centre. The foundation's collection is on display in the Bryk & Wirkkala Visible Storage, which is a combination of a storage facility, an exhibition, and a workspace.

In the summer of 2013, the Espoo Centre for Art and Computer Technology (Cartes) merged into EMMA's operations. Cartes was founded in 1990 by the Sibelius Academy, the Helsinki University of Technology, and the City of Espoo, and it was maintained by the non-profit Espoo Art and Computer Technology Foundation. Cartes organized and produced art events and artworks applying new technology, and promoted research in the field. In its final years, Cartes's main event was the annually held Cartes Flux new media art festival, which showcased domestic and international experimental media art. Cartes was one of the founding members of the Finnish Media Art Network, established in the spring of 2010.

EMMA was awarded the Museum of the Year prize in the spring of 2018.

In 2020, Kyösti Kakkonen, EMMA, and the City of Espoo signed a cooperation agreement, as a result of which Collection Kakkonen and a new exhibition space built for its long-term display opened at the WeeGee Exhibition Centre in November 2022.

== See also ==
- Kiasma
- Michael Jackson: On the Wall
