= Anne Barlow =

British curator

Anne Barlow is a curator and director in the field of international contemporary art, and currently serves as Director of Tate St Ives, Art Fund Museum of the Year 2018. There she directs and oversees the artistic vision and programme, including temporary exhibitions, collection displays, artist residencies, new commissions, and a learning and research programme. At Tate St Ives, Barlow has curated solo exhibitions of work by artists including Emilija Škarnulytė (2025); Małgorzata Mirga-Tas (2024); Outi Pieski (2024); Hera Büyüktaşcıyan (2023); Burçak Bingöl (2022); Prabhakar Pachpute (2022); Thảo Nguyên Phan (2022); Petrit Halilaj (2021); Haegue Yang (2020); Otobong Nkanga (2019); Huguette Caland (2019); Amie Siegel (2018) and Rana Begum (2018). For these presentations at Tate St Ives, she was also co-curator, in collaboration with the Lithuanian National Museum of Art Vilnius, of "Aleksandra Kasuba: Shelters for the Senses (2026)"; collaborating curator with Haus der Kunst München and mumok - Museum moderner Kunst Stiftung Ludwig Wien for "Liliane Lijn: Arise Alive" (2025); collaborating curator, with guest curators Morad Montazami and Madeleine de Colnet for Zamân Books & Curating, for "The Casablanca Art School" (2023); co-curator of "Naum Gabo: Constructions for Real Life" (2020) and collaborating curator with Castello di Rivoli, Turin for Anna Boghiguian (2019).

== Career ==
Barlow was formerly Artistic Director of Tate St Ives (2017–2018) and Director of Art in General in New York City (2007–2016). During her tenure at Art in General, she commissioned and curated projects with artists including: Dineo Seshee Bopape (2016); Donna Huanca (2015); Adelita Husni-Bey (2015); Marwa Arsanios (2015); Basim Magdy (2014); Sara Greenberger Rafferty (2014); Jill Magid (2013); Meriç Algün Ringborg (2013); Shezad Dawood (2013); Anetta Mona Chişa and Lucia Tkáčová (2013); Ohad Meromi (2010); Surasi Kusolwong (2007) and Ana Prvacki (2007). Barlow also initiated and oversaw programmatic partnerships with arts organizations in Brisbane, Bucharest, Cairo, Holon, Lisbon, London, Manchester, Riga, Tallinn, Tbilisi, Vilnius, Warsaw, and Zagreb. In 2014, she launched Art in General’s award-winning annual symposium "What Now?" on critical and timely issues in the field, establishing an educational partnership with the Vera List Center for Art and Politics at The New School, New York, and overseeing the symposia “Collaboration and Collectivity” (2014); “The Politics of Listening” (2015); and “On Future Identities” (2016).

In 2023, Barlow curated the Samdani Art Award for বন্যা / Bonna, the sixth Dhaka Art Summit, Bangladesh. She has curated and contributed to a number of biennial projects including “Tactics for the Here and Now”; “North by Northeast”, Latvian Pavilion at the 55th Venice Biennale (Co-Curator, 2013); 2nd Tbilisi Triennial, Georgia (Guest project curator, 2015) and “Shifts and Interruptions” for The Jerusalem Show VII, presented in framework of second Qalandiya International (Guest film curator, 2014). In 2013, she curated the Centennial Edition “Armory Open Forum” program for The Armory Show, New York. In 2025, she participated in the Experimenter Curators' Hub in Kolkata, India.

Prior to Art in General, Barlow was Curator of Education and Media Programs at the New Museum, New York (1999–2007) where she led the department’s new media, public programs, and collaborative projects. From 2004 to 2006, she conceptualized and developed the "Museum as Hub" initiative and established its first partnerships in Cairo, Eindhoven, Mexico City, and Seoul. She also curated numerous museum and on-line exhibitions, initiated and produced the museum’s Digital Culture Programs, and organized inter-disciplinary roundtables, public programs, performances and broadcasts. She was formerly Curator of Contemporary Art and Design at Glasgow Museums (1994–1999), where she oversaw its collection of international contemporary art and design, exhibitions program, artists’ residencies, commissions, and new acquisitions.

Barlow has been a jury member of numerous selection panels and awards including: 10th Triennial of Contemporary Art U3, Ljubljana (2024); 2023 Ars Fennica Award, Helsinki, Finland (2023); The Arts Foundation Futures Awards for Visual Arts (2022), London, UK; Artist of Tomorrow, Prishtina, Kosovo (2020-22 and 2016); British Pavilion Selection Committee, 58th Venice Biennale (2019); MAC International 2018, Belfast, Northern Ireland (2018); “Montblanc Cultural Foundation Curatorium” (2017–2019); Curatorial Advisory Committee, Mumbai Art Room, India (2017); Exposure 8, Beirut Art Center, Lebanon (2016); kim? Contemporary Art Award, Latvia (2016 and 2015); T-HT Award, Zagreb, Croatia (2014); and the Akbank Curatorial Prize, Istanbul, Turkey (2013). Barlow has also been a panelist/advisor to funding organizations including: Creative Capital, New York (2005 and 2006); New York State Council on the Arts (2003–2005); and the Rockefeller Foundation (2002 and 2003). She has lectured, moderated or participated in talks at organizations including: Paul Mellon Centre, London (2025); AWITA Association of Women in the Arts, London (2025); Professional Encounters, ARCOmadrid (2023); Duke University (2021); Istanbul Modern (2020); Govett-Brewster Gallery, New Plymouth, New Zealand (2019); Art Basel Conversations Programme, Art Basel Hong Kong (2019); Tate Modern (2018, 2019, 2026); the Institute of Modern Art, Brisbane (2015); the Sharjah Art Foundation (2012); IASPIS Stockholm (2011); ARCOmadrid (2011); Center for Contemporary Art, Warsaw (2009); and the IMLS National Leadership Awards (2004). In 2020, Barlow was awarded an Honorary Fellowship by Arts University Plymouth in recognition of her outstanding contribution to arts and culture.

== Publications ==
Barlow is editor/contributor to a number of publications including:

- Foreword and essay "Shelters for the Senses" in Aleksandra Kasuba: Shelters for the Senses, Tate Publishing, London (co-editor and contributor, 2026)
- “Navigating the In-Between: On Portals, Thresholds and the Interstitial” in Emilija Škarnulytė, Tate Publishing, London (co-editor and contributor, 2026)
- "A Landscape within a Landscape" in Hera Büyüktaşcıyan: Phantom Quartet, Arter, Istanbul, Turkey. Edited by Nilüfer Şaşmazer and Süreyyya Evren (contributor, 2025)
- Preface, in Małgorzata Mirga-Tas, Tate Publishing, London (co-editor and contributor, 2024)
- "Radical Softness" in Outi Pieski, Tate Publishing, London (co-editor and contributor, 2024)
- “Unconscious Kinships” in Earthbound Whisperers: A Journal by Hera Büyüktaşcıyan, Tate St Ives, UK (2023)
- Artist texts on Shiraz Bayjoo, Huma Bhabha, Huguette Caland, and Jumana Manna for In the Heart of Another Country: The Diasporic Imagination in the Sharjah Art Foundation Collection, edited by Omar Kholeif, co-published by Snoeck, Deichtorhallen, Hamburg and Sharjah Art Foundation (contributor, 2023)
- “Introduction”, in Thao Nguyen Phan, Tate Publishing (co-editor and contributor, 2022)
- “Foreword”, in Burçak Bingöl: Minor Vibrations on Earth, Tate Publishing, London (2022)
- Füsun Onur: Once upon a time... The Pavilion of Turkey-59th International Art Exhibition of La Biennale di Venezia, eds. Bige Örer and Nilüfer Şaşmazer, co-published by the Istanbul Foundation for Culture and Arts (İKSV) with Mousse Publishing for the English edition, and Yapı Kredi Publications (YKY) for the Turkish edition (contributor, 2022).
- “Unfinished Histories” in Petrit Halilaj: very volcanic over this green feather, Tate Publishing, London (co-editor and contributor, 2021)
- “John Wells” in The Story of Anchor Studio, ed. Elizabeth Knowles, Borlase Smart John Wells Trust, UK (contributor, 2021)
- “Foreword” in Rana Begum: Space Light Colour, edited by Anita Dawood, Lund Humphries Publishers Ltd., UK (contributor, 2021)
- “There Is No Real Solidarity without Physicality”, Interview with Zineb Sedira, PASS Journal, International Biennial Association (with Sylvie Fortin, 2021)
- “Asymetrical Encounters” in Haegue Yang: Strange Attractors, Tate Publishing, London (co-editor and contributor, 2020)
- “The Potential of Transparency” in Naum Gabo: Constructions for Real Life, Tate Publishing, London (co-editor and contributor, 2020)
- “Otobong Nkanga in Conversation with Anne Barlow” in Otobong Nkanga: From Where I Stand, Tate Publishing, London (co-editor and contributor, 2019)
- “Introduction” in Huguette Caland, Tate Publishing, London (co-editor and contributor, 2019)
- “PASS No. 1”, International Biennial Association (co-editor 2018)
- “What Now? On Future Identities”, Art in General, New York and Black Dog Publishing, United Kingdom (co-editor, 2017)
- “What Now? The Politics of Listening”, Art in General, New York, and Black Dog Publishing, United Kingdom (editor, 2016)
- “On Faith”, in “We Are All in This Alone”, Pavilion of the Republic of Macedonia, 56th Venice Biennale (contributor, 2015)
- “March Meeting 2012": Working with Artists and Audiences on Commissions and Residencies”, Paperback, 594 pages, 91 visuals, English and Arabic, Sharjah Art Foundation, United Arab Emirates (editor, 2014)
- “Basim Magdy: Fictions of the Real”, Film Program, Tate Modern, London, United Kingdom (2013)
- “Pigeons on the Grass Alas: Contemporary Curators Talk About The Field”, eds. Paula Marincola and Peter Nesbitt, The Pew Center for Arts & Heritage, Philadelphia (contributor, 2013)
- “Only at the South Pole Do All Directions Point North”, in North by North East, Pavilion of Latvia at the 55th Venice Biennale, May 2013
- “Anna K.E.” ed. Sabine Becker, Hatje Cantz Verlag, Ostfildern, Germany (contributor, 2012)
- "Realities:united Featuring", ed. Florian Heilmeyer, Ruby Press, Berlin, Germany (contributor, 2010)
- “Jacqueline Fraser”, essay for Artes Mundi Prize catalogue, Cardiff, Wales (contributor, 2004)
- “Naum Gabo”, in Sculpture in 20th Century Britain, Henry Moore Institute, Leeds (contributor, 2003)
- “Copy It, Steal It, Share It”, Borusan Art Gallery, Istanbul, Turkey (contributor, 2003)

Barlow has also published in numerous arts magazines and journals such as ArteEast Quarterly, ArtPulse Magazine, The Journal for Curatorial Studies, and Ibraaz.

== Education ==
Barlow holds a Masters in the History of Art from the University of Glasgow, Scotland.
