= Sarah Harrelson =

American magazine founder

- Born: Sarah Goldsmith; 1972 (age 53–54); United States
- Education: NYU
- Occupation: Editor-in-chief
- Years active: Since 1992
- Notable work: Cultured (magazine) (founder)

Sarah Harrelson (née Sarah Goldsmith in 1972) is an American magazine editor, founder and editor-in-chief of the arts magazine Cultured since 2011. She was editor-in-chief of the magazine Ocean Drive from 2007 to 2011, and launched the Home and Design section of the Miami Herald in 2002 that she headed until 2007. She also collects and curates contemporary art.

== Early life and education ==
Sarah Goldsmith grew up in Rumson, New Jersey. She studied at NYU where she earned a BA in political science and government in 1994, and minored in journalism. She initially did an internship at the office of New York governor, Mario Cuomo, but her interest in the world of magazines led her to take an internship position at Elle magazine in 1992.

== Career ==
After Elle, she moved to Miami in 1994 and became a style editor for the magazine South Florida, and was later promoted to executive director in July 1996. A few months later, she moved to Los Angeles to work as the West Coast retail editor for Women's Wear Daily and W. She then moved back to New York to work as entertainment editor at Seventeen, and then back to Miami in 2000, where she launched the Home and Design section of the Miami Herald in 2002. In 2007, she left the Miami Herald and became editor-in-chief of both Ocean Drive and Art Basel Magazine.

Harrelson started the arts magazine Cultured in 2011, which quickly found an audience and turned into her life's new venture. Harrelson also launched the Fort Lauderdale high-luxury magazine Venice in 2015 and the Los Angeles-focused magazine LALA in 2017. In 2021, she relocated to Los Angeles. In 2026, she published The Cultured Collector.

== Art collection ==
Harrelson is a collector of contemporary art. Her first acquisition was a painting by Spencer Sweeney. Her house is filled with mixed contemporary pieces she collects with her husband and made by artists such as Lucy Dodd, Ella Kruglyanskaya, Bunny Rogers, Arthur Jafa, Jonathan Lyndon Chase, Donna Huanca, Neil Baloufa, Janette Mundt, Elle Pérez, Josh Kline, Jacques Adnet, Tschabalala Self, Analia Saban, Karl Springer and Samuel Marx. Her art collection contains over 200 pieces (2019).

== Other roles ==
- Member of Barnard Advisory Council
- Since 2018: Member of the board of trustees of the Anderson Ranch Arts Center
- Member of the board of the Bass Museum

== Private life ==
She is married and lives in Los Angeles to the interior designer Austin Harrelson. They have three children. Her son Quinn also works in arts.
