= Anicka Yi =

Korean-American conceptual artist

- Born: 1971 (age 54–55); Seoul, South Korea
- Known for: conceptual art

Anicka Yi (born 1971 in Seoul, South Korea) is a conceptual artist whose work lies at the intersection of fragrance, cuisine, and science. She is known for installations that engage the senses, especially the sense of smell; and, for her collaborations with biologists and chemists. Yi lives and works in New York City.

== Early life ==
When she was two, Yi's family moved from Korea to Alabama and then to California. Her father is a Protestant minister and her mother works at a biomedical corporation. She has stated that she grew up in a Korean-American home.

After she graduated from Hunter College, she lived in London, where she freelanced for several years doing work as a fashion stylist and copywriter. It was at the age of 30 that she began to experiment with art, as she explored her interests in perfumery and science. Her first artworks were produced in 2008, when she was a member of an art collective, Circular File, along with Josh Kline and Jon Santos.

== Work ==
In her practice, Yi uses scent, tactility and perishability as a means to reconfigure the epistemological and sensorial terms of a predominantly visual art world.

=== Materials ===
Yi is known for her use of unorthodox, often living and perishable materials, including: tempura-fried flowers, canvases fashioned from soap, stainless-steel shower heads, fish oil pills, shredded Teva sandals boiled in recalled powdered milk, and bacteria. David Everitt Howe in Art Review wrote in 2018 that this "incongruous mix of media" is “arranged into something elegantly allegorical about the various industries that constitute our identity."

=== Process ===
Yi often manipulates these unconventional materials, sometimes completely transforming them, as in the case of kombucha which she fermented into leather-like material. For a work entitled verbatem? verbatom? 4 created in 2014 for her exhibit "Divorce" at 47 Canal, she injected live snails with oxytocin.

Yi cites writing as a primary element of her practice. In an interview with Ross Simonini, she explained, "Writing is one of my primary tools. I often discover my thoughts about the work through writing. Syntax, sentence structure . . . these things really help. I write a lot of backstory for my sculptures, as if they’re characters in a novel or screenplay. I share this writing with friends, but no one else sees it. I’m not really a visual person. I don’t think in images. I don’t sketch things. I don’t use visual references as much as I should. It’s a huge handicap for me. My writing doesn’t capture the idea for the work as a sketch would. So maybe I’m not working in the most productive way. My starting point is verbal."

She has also described her process as similar to, but an inverted version of, the scientific process employed in science labs. "Scientists have their hypothesis and then spend the next 20 or 30 years of their career trying to prove it, whereas artists won’t really understand what their hypothesis was until the end of their career."

=== Metaspore ===
Metaspore is an interdisciplinary research initiative started by Yi and incubated through her time as the Vice President of the Arts (VPA) Visiting Artist at Stanford Art Institute in 2022–2023. Yi co-taught a class at Stanford University as with her studio manager Remina Greenfield and Stanford lecturer Miguel Novelo called "Metaspore: The Networked Sensorium" . There, she taught a class that brought together STEM PhDs and those with art and filmmaking background to deconstruct human exceptionalism, techno-bio-sphere, deep time and network theory. Yi also hosted Metaspore Symposium in San Francisco, which featured Anicka Yi, Nate Mullen, Dr. Leslie Gray, Naoco Wowsugi, Dr. Arielle Johnson, David Wengrow, William Padilla-Brown, Devaki Bhaya, Jon Santos, Tishan Hsu, Sara Walker, Keith Williams, Jeremy Touissaint-Baptiste, Kriti Sharma, Stephanie Dinkins, Nicholas Laluk, Inter-Entity

== Select works and exhibitions ==
=== You Can Call Me F at The Kitchen ===
In her 2015 show at The Kitchen in New York City, You Can Call Me F, Yi took swabs from 100 women and with the help of MIT synthetic biologist Tal Danino cultivated the bacteria in an agar billboard that “assaults visitors” to help answer the question “What does feminism smell like?" Each woman was given the choice to where she would take a swab from her body, which ranged from the mouth to the vagina. She and Danino developed this work through "The Art and Science of Bacteria" a workshop they led during her residency at MIT. She explained that she wanted this work to explore the "patriarchal fear" surrounding hygiene and the female body. In the exhibition, Yi aimed to represent women's bodies in the form of smells rather than sights, denouncing what New Yorker writer Andrea K. Scott writes as "salacious male expectations".

=== "Life is Cheap" at the Guggenheim Museum ===
Yi was the winner of the biannual 2016 Hugo Boss Prize presented by the Guggenheim. In 2017, Yi debuted at the Guggenheim with the exhibition Life Is Cheap, which explores her "sociopolitical interest in the olfactive."

In the entrance of this exhibit, visitors encountered an aroma designed by the artist to be a hybrid scent of ants and Asian American women and named Immigrant Caucus. The central gallery space had two works facing each other with distinct, contained biospheres. One work, enclosed in a temperature-regulated space, Force Majeure features plexiglass tiles covered in agar on which bacteria, sourced from Chinatown and Koreatown in Manhattan, grow. The other work, Lifestyle Wars contains a colony of ants on a structure that resembles a circuit board, referencing the organization of society and the relationship of technology to this ordering.

In a video produced by the Guggenheim, Yi explains that "You're dealing with a society that is overly obsessed with cleanliness. And that's partially why I do work with bacteria as a material. Especially in the West, we have this morbid fear of pungent aromas, of bacteria. I'm giving a kind of visualization to people's anxieties about all the germs and bacteria that are proliferating all around us."

=== The Flavor Genome (2016) at the Whitney Biennial ===
The 2017 Whitney Biennial included Yi's 22-minute 3D video entitled The Flavor Genome, which follows a chemist searching through the Brazilian Amazon for a special plant. In the story, this plant is thought to have medicinal properties, so it is appealing to the pharmaceutical industry. The film considers themes ranging from bioengineering to imperialism.

=== 58th Venice Biennale (2019) ===
Yi's contribution to the group exhibition "May You Live in Interesting Times" at the 2019 Venice Biennale consisted of two sculptural installations. Biologizing the Machine (tentacular trouble) featured a grouping of illuminated cocoon-like pods made from stretched strips of dried kelp, which contained animatronic moths, whose shadows cast on the walls of the pods signify their fluttering presence. Beneath the pods, a curvaceous concrete base was marked by burbling ponds of water, housed in craters that sit at the foot of each pendant sculpture. The surface recalls the lunar landscape or, perhaps, that of another celestial body, gesturing towards the evolution of life, despite all, in inhospitable locales—what biologists call extremophiles.

The other component of Yi's Biennale entry was titled Biologizing the Machine (terra incognita), and used mud from the area around Venice, Italy, in order to create what the artist calls Winogradsky panels. These acrylic frames house the soil mixed with calcium carbonate, calcium sulfate, egg yolks, and cellulose in order to create a Winogradsky column, wherein bacteria within the soil sample separate into colorful gradients of aerobic and anaerobic strata. The results resemble abstract paintings that are created with the aid of one of humanities many helper species, which themselves figure largely in Yi's work.

=== In Love With The World, Hyundai Commission, Turbine Hall, Tate Modern ===
During the COVID-19 pandemic, Yi's studio, in collaboration with numerous technical specialists, mounted an ambitious project to fill the massive space of the Tate Modern's Turbine Hall with "aerobes": drone-like dirigibles whose movements were guided by artificial intelligence. Yi conceived of the hall's cavernous expanse as a kind of aquarium and she created two different types of mechanical organisms to inhabit it: xenojellies, which are tentacular, as well as more buoyant and mobile, exhibiting curiosity in foreign bodies. The other form of organism is a planulae, which is similar to an amoeba or protist, and its movements are restricted to hovering about near the bottom of the imagined aqueous environment. These forms are coated in tiny hairlike protrusions, meant to evoke cilia. Within a set of predetermined parameters, the aerobes moved about the hall according to movements of their own design, occasionally nesting in a maintenance area to have their batteries recharged, before rejoining the biosphere the artist devised as their environment.

== Other disciplines ==
=== Science ===
Yi works very closely with researchers at universities, including Columbia University and MIT. She worked especially closely with MIT Postdoctoral Fellow Tal Danino during her residency there. The pair developed new biological materials together.

=== Feminism ===
In many interviews, Yi has explained that she considers her work in smell to be a feminist response to visually-centered work designed around the male gaze. She has also commented on the gendered hierarchies of the senses, arguing for the revaluation of the sense of smell. As a self-taught connoisseur of perfumery, she seeks to elevate it from its relegation to the beauty industry. In the writings of critics such as Hsuan Hsu and Rachel Lee, Yi's work has also been understood at the intersection of critiques of both racial discrimination and gender inequality.

Critic Jane Yong Kim wrote about her 2015 show at The Kitchen, which included a piece displaying the organic matter from cheek swabs taken from over hundred women. Kim explains that these bacteria represent how women's bodies can pose threats from the potential for such bacteria to cause infections.

== Reception ==
New York publications have compared her work to that of Joseph Beuys, Matthew Barney, Robert Gober and Darren Bader. Some strategies she uses in her exhibits, such as You Can Call Me F, a New Yorker writer described to be reminiscent of Marcel Duchamp. The scholar Caroline A. Jones uses the term "bio-fiction" to describe Yi's work. She describes her works as exploring "a biopolitics of the senses."

== Selected exhibitions ==
=== Solo exhibitions ===
- 2011: Excuse Me, Your Necklace Is Leaking, Green Gallery, Milwaukee
- 2011: SOUS-VIDE, 47 Canal, New York
- 2013: Denial, Lars Friedrich, Berlin
- 2014: Divorce, 47 Canal, New York
- 2014: Death, Cleveland Museum of Art, Cleveland, OH
- 2015: 6,070,430K of Digital Spit, List Visual Arts Center, Cambridge, MA
- 2015: 7,070,430K of Digital Spit, Kunsthalle Basel, Switzerland
- 2016: Jungle Stripe, Fridericianum, Kassel
- 2017: Life Is Cheap, 2016 Hugo Boss Prize, Solomon R. Guggenheim Museum, New York
- 2021: In Love WIth The World, Hyundai Commission, Turbine Hall, Tate Modern, London
- 2022: Metaspore, Pirelli HangarBicocca, Milan
- 2023: The Postnatal Egg, Indianapolis Museum of Art, Indianapolis, Indiana
- 2024: There Exists Another Evolution, But In This One, Leeum, Samsung Museum of Art
- 2025: Anicka Yi, Museum of Fine Arts, Houston, Houston, Texas

=== Group exhibitions ===
- 2010: "179 Canal / Anyways," White Columns, New York, NY
- 2011: "Inside/Outside: Dressing the Monument," Lynden Sculpture Garden, Milwaukee, WI
- 2011: "Looking Back," The 6th White Columns Annual, White Columns, New York, NY
- 2012: "A Disagreeable Object," Sculpture Center, New York, NY
- 2012: "THE LOG-O-RITHMIC," Galleria d'Arte Moderna e Contemporanea di Bergamo, Bergamo, Italy
- 2013: "Some End of Things," Kunstmuseum Basel—Gegenwart, Basel, Switzerland
- 2013: "Meanwhile...Suddenly and Then," 12. Biennale de Lyon, Lyon, France
- 2013: "Love of Technology," Institute of Contemporary Art, Miami, FL
- 2014: "The Great Acceleration," Taipei Biennial, Taipei Fine Arts Museum, Taiwan
- 2015: "Inhuman," Fridericianum, Kassel
- 2015: "NO MAN’S LAND: Women Artists from the Rubell Family Collection," Rubell Museum, Miami, FL
- 2016: "The Eighth Climate (What Does Art Do?)," 11th Gwangju Biennale, Gwangju, South Korea
- 2016: "NO MAN’S LAND: Women Artists from the Rubell Family Collection," National Museum of Women in the Arts, Washington, D.C.
- 2016: "Overpop," Yuz Museum, Shanghai, China
- 2017: Whitney Biennial, Whitney Museum of American Art, New York, NY
- 2017: "An Inventory of Shimmers," List Visual Arts Center, Cambridge, MA
- 2017: "The Dream of Forms," Palais De Tokyo, Paris, France
- 2017: "Trigger: Gender as a Tool and a Weapon," New Museum, New York, NY
- 2018: "Art in the Age of the Internet, 1989 to Today," The Institute of Contemporary Art, Boston, MA
- 2018: "In Tune with the World," Fondation Louis Vuitton, Paris, France
- 2018: "The Racial Imaginary Institute: On Whiteness," The Kitchen, New York, NY
- 2019: "May You Live in Interesting Times," Venice Biennale 2019, Venice, Italy
- 2019: "New Order: Art and Technology in the Twenty-first Century," Museum of Modern Art, New York, NY
- 2019: "The Body Electric," Walker Art Center, Minneapolis, MN
- 2019: "Producing Futures: An Exhibition on Post-Cyber-Feminisms," Migros Museum für Gegenwartskunst, Zurich, Switzerland
- 2020: "Psychic Wounds: On Art & Trauma," The Warehouse, Rachofsky Collection, Dallas, TX
- 2021: "Catastrophe and Recovery," National Museum of Modern and Contemporary Art, Seoul, South Korea
- 2022: "Symbionts: Contemporary Artists and the Biosphere," List Visual Arts Center, Cambridge, MA

== Awards and honors ==
- 2011: The Louis Comfort Tiffany Foundation Award
- 2014-2015: Visiting Artist at the MIT Center for Art, Science & Technology
- 2016: Hugo Boss Prize
- 2023: Creative Capital Awards

== Media ==
=== Books ===
- 2015: Anicka Yi: 6,070,430K of Digital Spit (Cambridge, MA: MIT List Visual Arts Center).
- 2021: Anicka Yi: In Love With The World (London: Tate).
- 2022: Anicka Yi: Metaspore (Milan: Pirelli HangarBicocca).

=== Podcasts ===
- 2014: 'Lonely Samurai'

== Other activities ==
Yi was part of the jury that selected Stephanie Dinkins for the 2023 LG Guggenheim Award, an international art prize established as part of a long-term global partnership between LG Group and the Solomon R. Guggenheim Museum to recognize groundbreaking artists in technology-based art.
