= Bucharest Biennale =

Art biennale in Romania

The Bucharest Biennale (full name: Bucharest International Biennial for Contemporary Art) is a contemporary art biennale held in Bucharest, Romania.

== History ==
The first edition of the Bucharest Biennale was held in 2005, with the following one held in May–June 2006. From 2006 onwards, it has been held every two years. The biennale is organised by PAVILION – journal for politics and culture, and is sponsored by various private partners and cultural institutions. It was founded and is directed by Răzvan Ion and Eugen Rădescu.

== Editions ==
=== BB1 ===
The first edition took place in 2005 and curated by Eugen Rădescu.

=== BB2 ===
The 2006 edition was curated by the Hungarian critic and curator Zsolt Petranyi, and was held at numerous venues throughout Bucharest, including the National Museum of Geology, the National Museum of Literature (Romania), the National Centre for Dance, the Botanical Gardens, South Shop and the Herăstrău Skate Park. 18 artists, both Romanian and international, participated in the 2006 edition.

=== BB3 – Being Here. Mapping the Contemporary ===
The 2008 edition was held between 23 May and 21 June, and it was curated by Jan-Erik Lundström and Johan Sjöström from Sweden.

=== BB4 – Handlung. On Producing Possibilities ===
The 2010 edition was held between 21 May and 25 July 2010, thus expanding its duration for one month. It was curated by the German curator Felix Vogel.

=== BB5 – Tactics for the Here and Now ===
The 2012 edition was curated by Anne Barlow.

=== BB6 – Apprehension. Understanding Through Fear of Understanding ===
The 2014 edition was held from 23 May to 24 July. It was curated by Gergő Horváth. The edition was initially titled Belonging and Longing and curated by Nicolaus Schafhausen.

=== BB7 – What are we building down there? ===
The 2016 edition was held from 26 May to 17 June. It was curated by Niels Van Tomme with assistant Curator Charlotte Van Buylaere.

=== BB8 – Edit Your Future ===
The 2018 edition was held from 17 May to 8 July. It was curated by Beral Madra and Răzvan Ion.

=== BB9 – Farewell to Research ===
The 2020-2021 edition was curated by Henk Slager.

=== BB10 ===
The tenth edition will take place in 2022. It will be curated by Jarvis, an AI system conceived by Spinnwerk Vienna.
