= Burçak =

- Gender: Unisex
- Language: Turkish

Origin
- Meaning: "Vicia"

Burçak is a common unisex Turkish given name. In Turkish, "Burçak" means "Vicia".

== People ==
- Burçak Bingöl, Turkish visual artist
- Burçak Evren, Turkish film historian
- Burçak Özoğlu Poçan, Turkish mountain climber

== Fictional characters ==
- Burçak, one of the main characters of "Senin Uğruna", performed by Özge Ulusoy.
