= Unreal City =

British augmented reality art show

Unreal City was an art show in London, England devoted to the public display of Augmented reality art which ran from 8 December 2020 to 5 January 2021. The show featured work by artists Koo Jeong A, Nina Chanel Abney, Darren Bader, Marco Brambilla, Olafur Eliasson, Cao Fei, KAWS, Alicja Kwade, Bjarne Melgaard, and Tomás Saraceno.

To view the works, an individual would scan a QR code on one of several red life buoys in the River Thames with a tablet or smartphone. Immediately, the digital sculptures would appear on the screen, with many hovering above the river.
