= 47 Canal =

Contemporary art gallery

Coordinates: 40°43′2.9″N 73°59′31.8″W

47 Canal is a contemporary art gallery in New York City. It was founded in 2011 by artist Margaret Lee and art dealer Oliver Newton.

== History ==
=== 179 Canal ===
In 2009, Lee began organizing performances, parties, and art exhibitions in her studio building in Downtown Manhattan. An artist-run project space, 179 Canal was named after its address, 179 Canal Street.

179 Canal's first exhibition, Nobodies New York, was organized by Josh Kline, and opened on May 1, 2009. It featured Anicka Yi, Antoine Catala, Amy Yao, and other artists whom Kline was in dialogue with at the time. Other notable events held there include solo exhibitions by Antoine Catala, and Debo Eilers and Kerstin Brätsch's first collaboration as KAYA; Moving Shapes and Colors, a group exhibition curated by the now Art in America editor Brian Droitcour; and a performance by BFFA3AE.

In April 2010, Yi and Kline participated in a two-person exhibition entitled Loveless Marriages. Joanna Fiduccia in Artforum wrote that this evoked "a spirited irreverence that serves as a foil for deeper critical juices."

179 Canal closed in 2010 after its landlord, who had offered reduced rent throughout the gallery's first year, informed Lee that she could only continue to use the space at market rate. In October 2010, Matthew Higgs invited her to curate 179 Canal / Anyways, a group exhibition at White Columns, a nonprofit organization in New York's Meatpacking District. This "anti-retrospective" encapsulated 179 Canal's "roaming eccentricity," according to Artforum's Colby Chamberlain. In December 2010, 179 Canal participated in NADA Miami, showing works by Yi, Nolan Simon, and Michele Abeles, as well as a collaborative photo project initiated by Lee. The gallery received a nomination for “Best Alternative Space of the Year” at Rob Pruitt’s Second Art Awards at the Guggenheim.

=== 47 Canal ===
==== 2011–2013 ====
In 2011, Lee founded 47 Canal as a commercial project with her partner Oliver Newton. The name change represented the gallery's new address in Manhattan's Chinatown. Many artists who had shown at 179 Canal were given exhibitions in the gallery’s first year, such as Kline, Yi, and Abeles. A younger generation of New York-based artists were also introduced to the gallery’s program during this period, including Amy Lien & Enzo Camacho and Stewart Uoo.

==== 2014–2019 ====
In 2014, 47 Canal relocated to the second floor of 291 Grand Street, but retained its name. The first exhibition at this venue was New Feelings by Antoine Catala, a "series of experiments in sculpture and video" that incited viewers "to feel, both figuratively and literally, through machines."

While growing, the gallery continued to stage noncommercial performances alongside its exhibition program, such as by Sadaf H. Nava and Joe Heffernan, as well as fashion presentations by the New York-based label CFGNY.

In May 2016, Josh Kline presented Unemployment. The solo exhibition, which featured "uncanny" sculptures of 3D-printed human forms wrapped in plastic and a vinyl chair stuffed with shredded tax documents, was described by The New Republic as "a pointed portrait of what creative labor looks like in the gig-based economy, with all its shortcuts and crutches."

In 2017, 47 Canal introduced a wave of new artists to its program, including Janiva Ellis, Elle Pérez, Wang Xu, and Cici Wu. The same year, the gallery reopened its original space at 47 Canal Street. It held exhibitions at both locations while maintaining offices at 291 Grand Street, before letting go of its 47 Canal Street location once again in 2018. This same year, Danielle Dean mounted her first solo exhibition at 47 Canal, entitled Bazar. In the words of David Everitt Howe for Art in America, this "took the catalogues the iconic French department store Bazar de l’Hôtel de Ville has produced between the late nineteenth century and today as a lens through which to view the entangled histories of consumerism and racism."

Three artists represented by 47 Canal were included in the 2019 Whitney Biennial, curated by Rujeko Hockley and Jane Panetta: Kline, Ellis, and Pérez. Artworks by Yi and Catala were included in May You Live in Interesting Times, curated by Ralph Rugoff for the 58th Venice Biennale.

== Locations ==
- 47 Canal Street, 2nd Floor (2011–2014; 2017–2018)
- 291 Grand Street, 2nd Floor (2014–2024)
- 59 Wooster Street, 2nd Floor (2024-present)
