= Cultured (magazine) =

American magazine

- Editor: Sarah Harrelson
- Categories: Art, design, architecture
- Frequency: Bimonthly
- Founder: Sarah Harrelson
- Founded: 2011
- First issue: 2012
- Country: United States
- Based in: Los Angeles, California
- Language: English
- Website: culturedmag.com
- OCLC: 1009005169

Cultured is an independent print and digital magazine about contemporary art, architecture, design, fashion, film and music. It is distributed in North America and Europe. It was founded in 2011 by Sarah Harrelson who is also editor-in-chief.

== History ==
Cultured was launched in 2011 by Sarah Harrelson, who launched the Home and Design section of the Miami Herald and then served as editor-in-chief of Ocean Drive and Art Basel Magazine, who wanted to break away from traditional magazine standards. The first issue was released in 2012. The gallery R. & Company became the magazine's first advertiser. The annual publication frequency went from two, to four, to finally five issues per year.

In 2013, the magazine launched Cultured Commissions, an editorial concept where an artist is commissioned to make a small limited-edition collection to be exclusively showcased by Cultured. Rafael Cardenas, the Haas Brothers, Matthew Day Jackson, Dana Barnes and Agustina Woodgate, were among the artists commissioned. Cultured exclusively covered Eugenio López Alonso's personal art collection in 2014 and the collaborative curatorial initiative Full House with R & Company in 2020.

From 2021 to 2023, Cultured's total revenue increased by 106%, a growth mainly driven by the magazine's sponsored events. In July 2023, the magazine co-organized the celebration of Givenchy's new location on Rodeo Drive in Los Angeles. In 2024, Ali Pew was appointed fashion editor-at-large and Colin King design editor-at-large.

== Description ==
The magazine covers fashion, interior design, film and art. It has been described as a "sourcebook for contemporary art and design buffs" that "cross genres, cross-pollinates and challenges siloed convention", and illustrated with "unique, nontraditional photography".

Every year, the magazine releases a "CULT 100" list of the 100 people who define culture. Notable magazine covers included The Grimes cover (Spring 2019), Chance the Rapper by Theaster Gates, Jane Fonda by Jenny Holzer, Shygirl by Jeremy O. Harris and Gwyneth Paltrow. Cultured launched its first "Artists on artists" issue with Malcolm Washington and Nigerian artist Njideka Akunyili Crosby.

In 2023, the magazine published a standalone broadsheet sponsored by Balenciaga and dedicated to Art Basel and has extended the broadsheet format to other cultural events. Cultured has over 50,000 subscribers (2024). Advertisers include Gucci, Hermès, Chanel, Valentino, Saint Laurent, Rolex and Van Cleef.

== See also ==
- List of art magazines
