= Danielle Dean =

British-American artist (born 1982)

Danielle Dean (born 1982) is a British-American visual artist. She works in drawing, installation, performance and video. She has exhibited in London and in the United States; her work was included in an exhibition at the Hammer Museum focusing on new or under-recognized artists working in Los Angeles.

== Early life and education ==
Dean took a BA in fine arts from Central Saint Martins in London in 2006, and completed an MFA at the California Institute of the Arts in 2012. In 2012 she was an artist-in-residence at the Skowhegan School of Painting and Sculpture in Maine, and in 2013 was part of the independent study program of the Whitney Museum of Art in New York City; between 2014 and 2016 she was an artist-in-residence at the Museum of Fine Arts of Houston, Texas.

== Work ==
Dean's work explores "the colonization of the mind and body through media and cultural production, engaging their relationship to capital accumulation." Dean participated in the 2022 Whitney Biennial titled "Quiet as It's Kept" curated by Adrienne Edwards and David Breslin. She has also presented her work Amazon (Proxy) (2021) curated by Charles Aubin at the Performa 21 biennial.

== Collections ==
Her work is included in collections at the Hammer Museum, the Stedelijk Museum, the Whitney Museum and the Kadist Foundation. and has been reviewed in publications such as ArtForum and ARTnews.

== Teaching ==
Dean is currently an Associate professor in Visual Art at the University of California, San Diego. She has previously taught at the California Institute of the Arts, Valencia, CA.

== Solo exhibitions ==
- 2012 - Confession on a Dance Floor, The Bindery Projects, Minnesota, MN, U.S
- 2012 - PTL (Part Time Lover) at Commonwealth and Council, Los Angeles, CA, U.S
- 2015 - Hexafluorosilicic at Commonwealth and Council, Los Angeles, CA, U.S
- 2015 - Focus: Danielle Dean, The Studio Museum in Harlem, New York, NY
- 2017 - a shoe, a phone, a castle, Commonwealth and Council, Los Angeles, CA, U.S
- 2018 - True red Ruin, Museum of Contemporary Art Detroit, Detroit, MI
- 2018 - Landed (two-person show), Cubitt Gallery, London, UK
- 2018 - A Portrait of True Red, Cranbrook Art Museum, Bloomfield Hills, MI
- 2018 - Bazar, 47 Canal, New York, NY
- 2019 – Ludwig Forum für Internationale Kunst, Aachen
- 2022 - Art Now, Amazon, Tate Britain, London, England
- 2023 - Long Low Line, Midnight moment, Times Square Arts, New York, NY

== Awards ==
- Rema Hort Mann Foundation award, New York, 2014
- Creative Capital, visual arts award, New York, 2015
- Long Prize, Museum of Fine Arts, Houston, Texas, 2016
