= Gay 45 =

Romanian LGBTQ+ publication

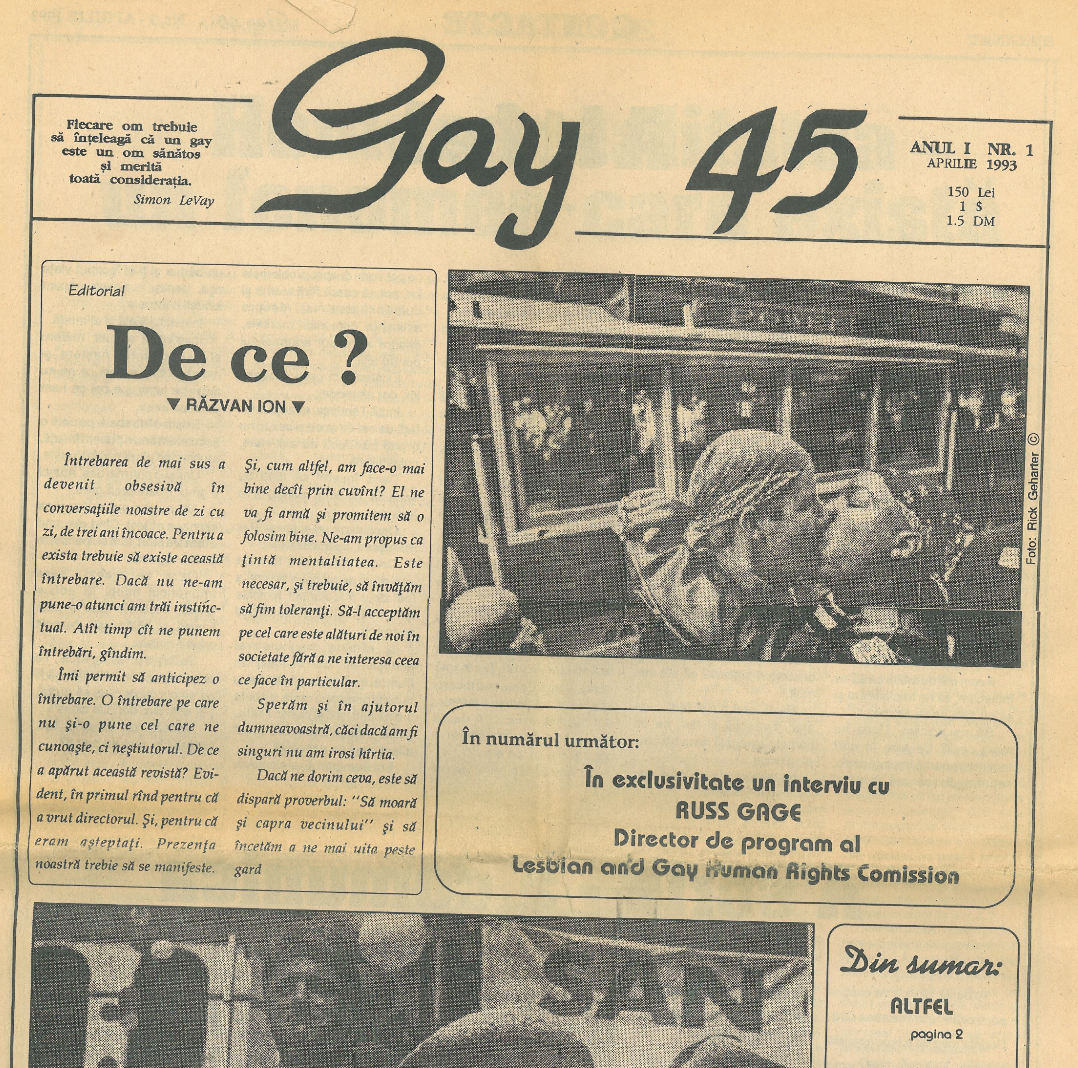
- Front page of the first print edition of GAY45 (1993)
- Founding Editor: Răzvan Ion
- Editor-in-Chief: Jude Jones
- News Editor: Taylor Abbot
- Senior Multimedia Editor: Andrei Iancu
- Social Media Editor: Mila Edensor
- Deputy Social Media Editor: Zero Green
- Staff writers: Sasha Brandt; Arthur Cormerais; João Delfim; Ione Gildroy; Jackson Williams
- Categories: Lifestyle
- Frequency: Biweekly
- Circulation: 170,000
- Publisher: DerAffe KuKV
- Founder: Răzvan Ion
- Founded: 1993
- First issue: 21 April 1993; 32 years ago
- Country: Netherlands
- Based in: Austria
- Language: English
- Website: gay45.eu

GAY45 is an online, English-language queer publication, now based in Vienna, Austria and London, UK. Was republished starting with 2023. It is notable as having been Eastern Europe's first queer publication and one of the oldest continuous queer journals in Europe, founded as a print magazine in April 1993 by activist and editor Răzvan Ion. The magazine has received various accolades for its contributions to the queer community and its innovative use of technology in journalism.

== History ==
GAY45 was founded in [21 April 1993]] in Romania by Răzvan Ion, then a Dutch journalist. It was created in response to Article 200, a section of the Penal Code of Romania that criminalised homosexual relationships. The magazine aimed to change public 'mentality' towards homosexuality and promote an integrated European identity.

Today, GAY45 is based in Vienna and London, according to its website, is "committed to publishing high quality journalism" on topics ranging from politics, news, investigative reporting, poetry, music, film, pop culture, and art.
