= Burçak Evren =

Turkish film historian

Burçak Evren (born 1947) is a Turkish film historian, author, journalist, researcher, and film critic. He is currently the editor-in-chief of the Sinematürk film magazine published in Istanbul. He has also taught film at the Film-TV Department, Faculty of Fine Arts at Marmara University, Istanbul.

== Biography ==
Burçak Evren was born in 1947 in Istanbul, where he studied at the Faculty of Law and later at the Department of Classical Archaeology and Prehistory in the Faculty of Literature, Istanbul University from which he graduated. He began to work as a journalist in 1969 while he was still a university student. He worked as news designer, art director, editor for art pages, desk editor, publication coordinator, editor-in-chief and film critic at such Turkish newspapers as Dünya, Yeni İstanbul, Yeni Ortam, Politika, Vatan, Güneş, Hürriyet, Cumhuriyet, Milliyet, Pazar Postası and also at Gelişim Yayınları (Gelişim Publishing).

Evren has contributed to more than 30 encyclopedias, including Meydan Larousse, Oksford, Türkiye and İstanbul, writing entries related to film and arts. He was president and director of the first and second editions of the International Silk Road Film Festival in Bursa in 2006 and 2007. He also co-wrote the screenplay of the 2006 Turkish documentary film Troia with Sevinç Baloğlu.

== Bibliography ==
=== Works on film ===
- Evren, Burçak. (1983). Türk Sinema Sanatçıları Ansiklopedisi. Film-San Vakfı Yayınları, İstanbul.
- Evren, Burçak. (1990). Türk Sinemasında Yeni Konumlar. Broy Yayınları, İstanbul.
- Evren, Burçak. (1993). Başlangıcından Günümüze Sinema Dergileri. Korsan Yayınları, İstanbul.
- Evren, Burçak. (April 1995). Oscar Ödülleri Tarihi (1927-1994). AD Yayıncılık, İstanbul.
- Evren, Burçak. (1995). Sigmund Weinberg, Türkiye'ye Sinemayı Getiren Adam. Milliyet Yayınları, İstanbul. ISBN 975-325-054-1
- Evren, Burçak. (1995). Türk Sinemasında Cinsellik. AD Yayınları, İstanbul.
- Evren, Burçak. (1995). Türk Sinemasında İntiharlar ve Cinayetler Dosyası. Vizyon Yayınları, İstanbul.
- Evren, Burçak; Asena, Duygu. (1995). Yeşilçam'la Yüzyüze. Açı Yayınları, İstanbul. ISBN 978-975-8009-13-8
- Evren, Burçak. (1997). Değişimin Dönemecinde Türk Sineması. Antrakt, İstanbul.
- Evren, Burçak. (1998). Eski İstanbul Sinemaları Düş Şatoları. Doğan Kitapçılık, İstanbul. ISBN 975-325-481-4
- Evren, Burçak. (2006). İlk Türk Filmleri. Es Yayınları, İstanbul. ISBN 975-8716-66-2
- Evren, Burçak. (2006). Türk Sinema Yönetmenleri Sözlüğü. Altın Portakal Kültür ve Sanat Yayınları, Antalya. ISBN 9944-5665-3-5
- Evren, Burçak. (2006). Aytaç Arman. Altın Portakal Kültür ve Sanat Yayınları, Antalya. ISBN 975-00240-6-0
- Evren, Burçak. (2006). Ustasız Usta Atıf Yılmaz. Dünya Kitle İletişim Vakfı Yayınları, Ankara.
- Evren, Burçak. (2009). Altın Koza 40. Yıl Onur Ödülleri Kataloğu. Altın Koza Yayınları, Adana. ISBN 978-605-60-4114-3.
- Evren, Burçak. (March 2009). Macit Koper. Dünya Kitle İletişimi Araştırma Vakfı Yayınları (10), Ankara. ISBN 978-975-96524-8-7.

=== Other works ===
- Evren, Burçak. (1994). Galata Köprüleri Tarihi. Milliyet Yayınları, İstanbul. ISBN 975-506-168-1
- Evren, Burçak. (1996). Eski İstanbul'da Kahvehaneler. Doğan Kitapçılık, İstanbul. ISBN 978-975-325-240-9
- Evren, Burçak; Can, Dilek G. (1997). Yabancı Gezginler ve Osmanlı Kadını. Milliyet Yayınları, İstanbul. ISBN 975-325-459-8
- Evren, Burçak. (1998). 20'li Yılların Bozkır Kasabası Ankara. Doğan Kitapçılık, İstanbul. ISBN 978-975-313-035-6
- Evren, Burçak. (1999). Osmanlı Esnafı. Milliyet Yayınları, İstanbul. ISBN 975-6817-29-1 (Published translation: (2001) Ottoman Craftsmen and their Guilds, Doğan Kitapçılık, İstanbul. ISBN 975-6770-12-0)
- Evren, Burçak. (2000). İstanbul'un Deniz Hamamları ve Plajları. İnkılap Kitabevi, İstanbul. ISBN 978-975-10-1638-6
- Evren, Burçak. (2005). Surların Öte Yanı Zeytinburnu. Zeytinburnu Belediyesi, İstanbul. ISBN 975-92356-0-9
