= Stewart Uoo =

American artist (born 1985)

Stewart Uoo (born 1985, California) is an American artist. Uoo's art practice explores where the social and digital overlap often incorporating fashion and video game aesthetics into his watercolors, sculptures, and video pieces. Uoo's artworks have been included in the 9th Berlin Biennale and the 10th Gwangju Biennale and were featured alongside artist Jana Euler in a two-person exhibition at The Whitney Museum of American Art in 2013. Uoo has exhibited at 47 Canal in New York, Galerie Buchholz in Berlin, Germany, and Mendes Wood DM in São Paulo, Brazil, amongst other galleries. Uoo is the host of It's Gets Better, an art-performance event held every summer that showcases artists, musicians, poets, and fashion icons. Uoo lives and works in New York City. Stewart Uoo is represented by Galerie Buchholz, Cologne, and 47 Canal, New York.

== Early life and education ==
Uoo was born and raised in California. Uoo graduated from California College of Arts in 2007 and went on to attend the Städelschule in Frankfurt, Germany.

== Work ==
Titled Life is Juicy, Uoo's first solo New York exhibition opened at 47 Canal in 2012. The exhibition included three of the artist's signature cyborg mannequins cast in polyurethane resin and woven through with barbed wire and various electronics. The sculptures typically wear clothing worn down by the weather that the artist puts on their roof. Additionally, the exhibition included a video work and several pencil drawings.

In 2014, Uoo had his first exhibition at Galerie Daniel Buchholz in Berlin, Germany, titled No Tears in Rain. The exhibition presented new work by Uoo: security gate sculptures altered with silicone, paint, tufts of human hair and rust. The gates were shown alongside fashion editorial-inspired photographs by Heji Shin and featured DeSe Escobar, Juliana Huxtable, and Eliot Glass.

In 2015, Uoo was selected for the Forbes 30 Under 30 list. His first show in Brazil opened at Mendes Wood in São Paulo. The show was titled Viva La Juicy. Claire Rigby of ArtReview wrote of the show, "There's a moving ruined elegance to the paper objects, in their careful preconstruction of an imagined future world, hacked, garbled artefacts and all, that seems to signal the way forward to something potentially important."

In 2016, the artist received institutional recognition with appearances in MoMA PS1's Greater New York and Human Interest: Portraits of the Whitney’s Collection at the Whitney Museum of American Art.

Later that year, Uoo held a two-person exhibition with mentor Franklin Williams, titled Curtains, at Canal 47. The exhibition included several of Williams' soft sculptures, called moments, that, "often abstract (and obsess over) an idiosyncratic, near-alien biology into a flat, pop symbolism with a spindly, almost arachnid complexity." Alongside Williams' sculptures, Uoo presented similar collaged curtain works made from various sweaters and sweatpants, fleeces, fatigues, and polos. Side-by-side, the works by both artists are difficult to tell apart. The exhibition also included photographs of musician and performer Contessa Stuto as a gallery assistant. The exhibition's press release was written by Stuto and further blurred the lines of artist, artwork, and gallery. Uoo was selected to participate in 9th Berlin Biennale curated by art collective DIS. The Biennale explored a range of contemporary topics including advertising, digital technology, and the Internet.

In late 2017, Uoo had a second solo-exhibition at Canal 47, titled Handmade Paper. The show included several works of handmade paper using a number of materials such as designer shopping bags, cotton, flies, dust, synthetic fibers, and cockroaches. Two cyborg mannequin sculptures were included in the show.

Uoo organizes an annual performance-based event each summer titled It's Gets Better. First staged at Artists Space, New York, the performances have included a range of artists including K8 Hardy, Juliana Huxtable, Jacolby Satterwhite, Ryan Trecartin, and various members from House of Ladosha.

=== Themes and style ===
Kat Herriman of Cultured Magazine writes that Uoo's, "dystopian sculptures and videos offer a humorous take on contemporary issues," specifically aspects of gender, sexuality, technology, and identity. Uoo often works with sculpture and video and typically includes collaborative photograph works alongside each of his shows.

Cassie Packard of Hyperallergic writes of Uoo's photographs, "The manner in which identity is some open-ended combination of gender performance, advertising theatrics, and artificial appendages feels uncomplicated, which may be Uoo's point. A couple of decades on, Judith Butler's Gender Trouble isn't as troubling as it used to be; with networks, branding, and affective labor everywhere we look, most representations of identity we encounter are to some degree dialogic, performed, and enhanced."

== Exhibitions ==
=== Solo exhibitions ===
- Handmade Paper, 47 Canal, New York, NY, 2017
- Curtains, 47 Canal, New York, 2016
- Viva La Juicy, Mendes Wood DM, Sāo Paulo, Brazil, 2015
- No Tears in Rain, Galerie Daniel Buchholz, Berlin, 2014
- Life is Juicy, 47 Canal, New York, NY 2012

=== Two-person exhibitions ===
- Outside Inside Sensibility (with Jana Euler), curated by Jay Sanders, The Whitney Museum of American Art, New York, NY, 2013

=== Selected group exhibitions ===
- Teenscape, Schloss, 2017
- After Us, K11 Art Foundation, 2017
- High Anxiety, Rubell Family Collection, Miami, FL, 2016
- Streams of Warm Impermanence, David Roberts Art Foundation, 2016
- Baby I'm a Star, Romeo, 2016
- Good Dreams, Bad Dreams – American Mythologies, Aïshti Foundation, 2016
- All Around Amateur, Bergen Kunsthall, 2016
- Human Interest: Portraits from the Whitney's Collection, Whitney Museum of American Art, 2017
- Its Better for Sunday Sessions, MoMA PS1, 2016
- Greater New York, MoMA PS1, 2015
- Grand Opening Reception, km temporaer, 2015
- Mirror Effect, The BOX Gallery, 2015
- Artists' Film Club: Breaking Joints: Part 1, ICA London, 2015
- Looks, ICA, 2015
- Inhuman, Fridericianum, 2015
- An Interior That Remains an Exterior?, Kunstlerhaus, Halle fur Kunst & Medien, 2015
- Scan Scroll Surf: Frames and Windows, Mumok, Vienna, 2014
- 10th Gwangju Biennale: Burning Down the House, Gwangju, Korea, 2014
- Rockaway!, MoMA PS1, Fort Tilden and Rockaway Beach, 2014
- AIRBNB Pavilion, 2014 Venice Architecture Biennale, 2014
- Abandon the parents, Statens Museum for Kunst, 2014
