= Tal Danino =

American synthetic biologist

- Awards: TED Fellow; Department of Defense Era of Hope Scholar Award; NSF CAREER Award; Lloyd J. Old STAR Award; Pershing Square Sohn Prize for Young Investigators in Cancer Research; AIMBE Fellow; CZI Biohub Investigator; Pershing Square Lotus Award

Academic background
- Education: University of California, Los Angeles (B.S., 2005) University of California, San Diego (PhD., 2011)
- Thesis: Synthetic gene oscillators and their applications
- Doctoral advisor: Jeff Hasty

Academic work
- Discipline: Synthetic Biology
- Institutions: Massachusetts Institute of Technology; Columbia University
- Website: https://www.daninolab.nyc/index.html

Tal Danino is an American biomedical engineer and synthetic biologist who is an Associate Professor with tenure in the Department of Biomedical Engineering at Columbia University and director of the Synthetic Biological Systems Laboratory.

== Education ==
Danino graduated from the University of California, Los Angeles with Bachelor of Science degrees in physics, mathematics and chemistry. He received a Master of Science and Doctor of Philosophy in Bioengineering from the University of California, San Diego, and completed Postdoctoral training at the Massachusetts Institute of Technology.

== Research ==
Tal Danino is an Associate Professor in the Department of Biomedical Engineering at Columbia University and director of the Synthetic Biological Systems Laboratory, which focuses on using synthetic biology to engineer living medicines. Below are a few summaries of his research directions:

A central research direction in Danino's laboratory is the development of programmable bacterial cancer therapies. His group engineers tumor-colonizing bacteria with genetic circuits that control when and where therapeutic payloads are produced, including systems for local immunotherapy, controlled lysis, enhanced tumor tropism, and improved bacterial delivery. This work is designed to exploit the ability of certain microbes to accumulate within tumors while reducing systemic exposure to therapeutic agents.

A second area of research focuses on cooperative living therapeutics that combine engineered bacteria with other treatment platforms. The laboratory has developed approaches in which bacteria interact with CAR-T cells and oncolytic viruses, with the goal of improving targeting and therapeutic activity in solid tumors. This includes probiotic-guided CAR-T-cell systems and engineered bacteria that can launch and regulate oncolytic viruses.

A third research direction examines how synthetic biological systems can be programmed to sense, record, and respond to complex biological environments. Danino's group has developed genetically programmed bacterial biosensors, dynamic encapsulation systems, and engineered bacterial swarm patterns that can record environmental inputs. These studies combine synthetic biology with microscopy, quantitative analysis, and computational approaches to develop both therapeutic systems and broader microbial sensing technologies.

Danino has received a number of research awards and honors, including the NSF CAREER Award, the Department of Defense Era of Hope Scholar Award, the Cancer Research Institute Lloyd J. Old STAR Award, and the Pershing Square Sohn Prize for Young Investigators in Cancer Research. He was named a TED Fellow in 2015, and in 2025 was elected to the American Institute for Medical and Biological Engineering College of Fellows.

Danino has also communicated his research to public audiences through TED. His 2015 TED presentation, Programming bacteria to detect cancer (and maybe treat it), described the use of engineered microbes and quorum-sensing systems for cancer detection and potential therapy. His work was later presented in the TED-Ed animation Hacking bacteria to fight cancer, which explains how engineered bacteria can be programmed to deliver therapeutic agents within tumors.

== Art ==
Danino also works at the intersection of synthetic biology, visual art, and public engagement. He transforms living biological materials, including bacteria and mammalian cells, into bioart using microscopy, biological patterning, photography, and other visual media. His work often explores the relationship between humans, microorganisms, disease, and technology.

He has participated in artist residencies and interdisciplinary programs at Eyebeam and Seed and was a participant in Rhizome and the New Museum's 7×7 program. His art-science work has been covered by publications including The New York Times and Wired.

His collaborations have included work with Vik Muniz and Anicka Yi. With Muniz, he developed the Colonies series, which used bacteria, cancer cells, virus-infected cells, and other living biological materials to generate microscopic patterns that were photographed and presented as large-scale artworks. The collaboration was also discussed in Nature Reviews Cancer, which described the use of cell-patterning and microscopy techniques to create visual artworks from living cells. He also worked with Anicka Yi during her residency at the Massachusetts Institute of Technology. Their projects used cultured bacteria and biological samples as artistic materials, including a work developed from microbial samples collected from women. The pair also co-taught an MIT workshop, The Art and Science of Bacteria, examining the use of microorganisms in artistic practice.

His own microbial artworks examine the patterns generated as bacteria grow, swarm, communicate, and compete. The Microuniverse series, developed during his Eyebeam residency, explored both controlled and chaotic forms of microbial growth and their visual similarities to larger natural structures. His laboratory has also used microscopy, histology, cellular patterns, and other research-derived imagery as tools for science communication and public engagement. This approach has extended to cancer-related outreach. In the 2022 Nature Reviews Cancer article Reimagining cancer research with art, he and colleagues discussed how cancer-related art can be used to communicate complex biology to broader audiences, initiate conversations about cancer research and health disparities, and create connections among researchers, patients, advocates, and artists.

In 2024, he published Beautiful Bacteria: Encounters in the Microuniverse with Rizzoli Electa. The book combines microbial photography, scientific explanation, and visual art to examine bacterial forms, behaviors, and interactions with humans. The publisher's edition includes a foreword by Vik Muniz and presents microbial imagery produced through his scientific and artistic work.
