= Ohad Meromi =

Israeli sculptor (born 1967)

Ohad Meromi אוהד מרומי
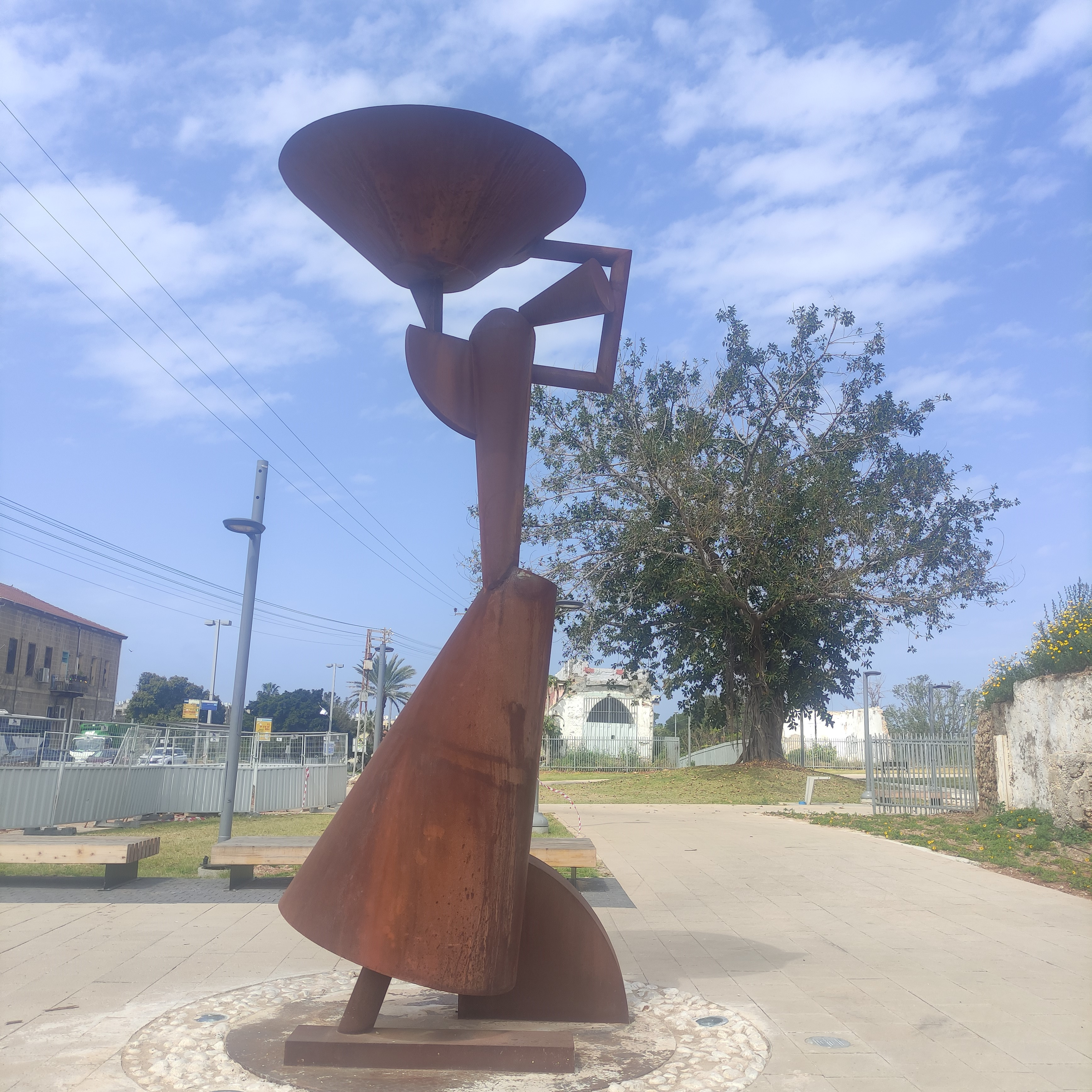
- Bikurim (2023) by Ohad Meromi, located in Ha-khorshot Park, Israel. Corten steel.
- Born: 1967 (age 58–59); Kibbutz Mizra, Israel
- Education: Bezalel Academy of Art and Design
- Known for: Sculptor

Ohad Meromi (Hebrew: אוהד מרומי; born 1967) is an Israeli sculptor. He lives and works in Brooklyn, New York. In 2023, Meromi began representation with New York gallery, 56 Henry.

Meromi is known for his distinctive and often provocative sculptures. One of his most notable works is The Sunbather, an eight-foot-long, 4,000-pound bronze sculpture of a reclining human form, painted vibrant pink. This piece, installed in Long Island City, sparked significant controversy due to the lack of community involvement in the selection process and its striking appearance. Critics described the sculpture as "too bright, too big, too ugly and too expensive," with some expressing concerns that its size and color could distract drivers and cause accidents.

== The Sunbather ==
His sculpture The Sunbather (an eight-foot-long, 4,000-pound bronze sculpture of a reclining human form, painted vibrant pink and costing an estimated $515,000, of which Meromi received $103,000) was chosen to be installed on Long Island City, a decision which evoked significant controversy, primarily because there was no community involvement in the process of its selection. A three-person panel that was composed of a member from Socrates Sculpture Park, SculptureCenter and a local artist selected the commission without input from Community Board 2 or the public was responsible for choosing it. Residents complained the sculpture was "too bright, too big, too ugly and too expensive". One Community Board 2 Member said, “With art some people love it, some people hate it…but this looks like you dug up Gumby’s grandmother and threw it on the median.” There were also concerns that both the size and the color of the sculpture could distract passing drivers and cause accidents. (“Chromophobia,” according to Meromi).

To resolve the dispute, a meeting was called, involving 300 residents, Cultural Affairs commissioner Tom Finkelpearl, City Council Member Jimmy Van Bramer and Meromi himself.

In opposition to the sculpture, Hunt Rodriguez, an artist from Bushwick, Brooklyn, installed his own protest piece on Jackson Avenue: two conjoined and brightly painted wooden pyramids, one standing vertically and the other laid on its side, with a sign that read in part: “This is not against the artist. It is against the misuse of our tax dollars.” He explained that the standing pyramid represented “the love of the residents” and the fallen pyramid represented “the idea of the city doing something without the support of the community.”

On 14 May 2015, the city council unanimously passed a bill that provided residents with more say before certain pieces of public art are installed. The bill was introduced by Vam Bramer. It amended the Department of Cultural Affairs’ Percent for Art Program, which was borne out of a 1982 law that requires that one percent of the budget for city-funded construction projects be spent on artwork.

The new bill requires the Department of Cultural affairs to notify the public via its website of its intention to install a piece of public art as part of the Percent for Art program.

However, a subsequent public meeting is now required allowing residents to speak with the panel’s recommended artists about their concepts, according to a spokesman for Van Bramer’s office. The bill also requires advance notification of these meetings, including online postings.

The sculpture was approved at a Design Commission Meeting on 26 October 2015.

Construction of the sculpture started on 3 August 2016. The sculpture was permanently installed at the intersection of Jackson Avenue and 43rd Avenue by 15 November 2016. Almost immediately, Van Bramer fielded calls to remove the sculpture.

The controversy led to the City Council passing a legislation package that overhauled the Percent for Art program (under which The Sunbather was selected), creating more transparency and accountability to the community during the process of commissioning a piece of public art. The legislation package contained six separate bills, four of which focus specifically on the Percent for Art program. The bills focusing on the Percent for Art program require that the panel deciding on Percent for Art commissions include representatives from the office of the Borough President, Community Board, and Council Member in whose district the project is located.

It also required the Department of Cultural Affairs (DCLA) to collect demographic data on the artists receiving commissions to encourage diversity and would require more outreach encouraging artists to apply for the program in the seven most common languages in New York City.

The legislation raised the cap on each Percent for Art project from $400,000 to $900,000 for projects under a certain threshold, and from $1.5 million to $4 million for projects over that threshold.

The other two bills in the package require reports from the Arts Commission and the Cultural Institutions groups to increase transparency.

== Education ==
- Bezalel Academy of Art and Design
- 2004 M.F.A., Columbia University, New York

== Awards and prizes ==
- 1998 Nathan Gottsdiner Foundation, The Israeli Art Prize, Tel Aviv Museum of Art, Tel Aviv
- 2008 Foundation for Contemporary Arts Grants to Artists award
- 2002 The Minister of Education, Culture and Sport Prize, The Ministry of Education, Culture and Sport

== Articles ==
- Haaretz – Gallery, New Exhibitions, 25 March 2010 (Hebrew)
- We are on the Shelf, TIME OUT Tel Aviv, 14 October 2010 (Hebrew)

== Sources ==
- "Ohad Meromi". Information Center for Israeli Art. Israel Museum.
