= Rafael Cardenas =

Mexican-American photographer (born 1971)

- Born: Jalisco, Mexico
- Known for: Black and white street photography
- Notable work: MAS ACA, Self-Published Photography Book, 2016, Landscapes and Land Dwellers, Self-Published Photography Book, 2022
- Website: Official website

Rafael Cardenas (born 1971) is a Mexican-American photographer based in East Los Angeles and Boyle Heights.

== Biography ==
Rafael Cardenas was born in 1971 in Jalisco, Mexico. He was raised in East Los Angeles and considers the city a huge influence on him as a person and as an artist. In particular, he finds the Eastside, east of the L.A. river as inspiration for his work. Ever since he was a child, he would carry a Kodak 110 or a Canon Rebel to photograph his daily life, and it was only after buying a professional Canon EOS 10D from a former colleague in 2010 did he begin to practice professionally.

Prior to becoming a professional photographer, he held different administrative assistant positions in the medical and legal fields. He also created some graphic design projects, acting on stage and screen, and fronting for a Los Angeles band named Slowrider. In 2009, he began working for the local art magazine, Citizen L.A., and he started taking his own photographs for his articles.

== Photography ==
Cardenas is a self-taught photographer who documents East Los Angeles with the purpose of discovery, producing work, and capturing moments. His work consists primarily of black-and-white photographs documenting the Angeleno streets and its communities.

=== RAFA 2020 (2020) ===
In 2010, he started a 365-day photo series where he would shoot thousands of photos a day. He revisted this project in 2020, capturing the COVID-19 pandemic.

=== Anynoumous (2016-2019) ===
Cardenas was commissioned to create a photographic slide show for the LA Metro Blue line train.

=== Reflections and Gifts of East Los Angeles (2014) ===
A photography project created in conjunction with the 40th anniversary of Self Help Graphics & Art. Inspired by a street-photography project when Self-Help Graphics opened, Cardenas installed pop-up photo booths in select locations in east LA, and told subject that they could pick up their photographs at the same location a month later. When the subject arrived to pick up their photographs, they found that their image was included in a large photo mural.

== Publication ==
On July 8, 2016, Cardenas released MAS ACA, a Self-Published Photography Book. This was his first collection book filled with over 100 black-and-white photographs from 2010 to 2015. This collection documents the East Los Angeles neighborhoods that go through a change of gentrification, are often unseen, and disappearing street landmarks. The book includes an introduction by Harry Gamboa Jr with poetry by Gloria Enedina Alvarez and Joseph Rios.
