= Răzvan Ion =

Dutch tech activist and journalist

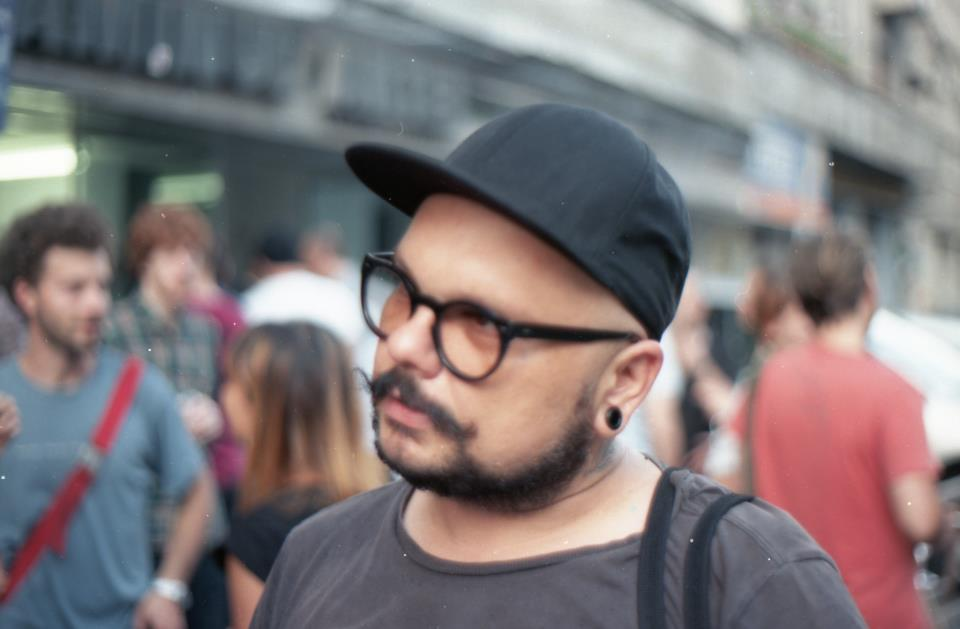
- Răzvan Ion in 2019
- Born: Amsterdam, Netherlands
- Occupations: Theoretician, curator, professor, queer tech activist
- Known for: Academical activity, AI achievements.

Răzvan Ion (/Rəzvan Ion/) is an intersectional innovator, academic curator, tech queer activist, introspective journalist and professor of critical thinking. He is best known for leading the DerAffe Vienna team in creating A.I. JARVIS, the first artificial intelligence curator in history and Gay 45, a European queer magazine.

== Career ==
Dr Ion is the founder of Pavilion Art Center, Pavilion Journal, and Bucharest Biennale. In 1993, he founded the first queer publication in Eastern Europe, GAY 45, which is now a European queer indie journal and diversified elevation platform.

He has held positions as an associate professor and lecturer at several institutions, including the University of California, Berkeley; Hochschule für Musik und Theater München; University of Vienna; Lisbon University; Central University of New York; University of London; Sofia University; University of Kyiv; University of Bucharest, where he taught Curatorial Studies and Critical Thinking. He has held conferences and lectures at various art institutions such as Witte de With in Rotterdam; Kunsthalle Vienna; Art in General in New York; Calouste Gulbenkian in Lisbon; and Casa Encedida in Madrid.

Dr Ion has worked as the curator of Bucharest Biennale 8, together with Beral Madra, and as the chief curator of creart Gallery Bucharest and a private gallery in Taipei. He has been a speaker on technology and arts for Istyle, Apple, MindChain, Business Review, and other organizations and corporations.

As a curator, director, and founder of various institutions, he has worked with several artists, including Erwin Wurm, Jan Kaila, Yoko Ono, AES+F, Aga Ousseinov, Naeem Mohaiemen, Sabrina Gschwandtner, Minerva Cuevas, Mona Hatoum, Asier Mendizabal, and many others.

Dr Ion curated the exhibition "Wie wir Dinge betrachten" for the European Union Council Presidency of Austria. His upcoming book with the provisional title "The Key to Augmented Education: Data Analytics" is scheduled for publication in 2025.

He wrote texts for general and academic publications like Mahkuscript, New York Art Review, Reforma, Pavilion, etc.

He was also a tenured professor at the University of Bucharest where he taught a course on curatorial studies & critical thinking.

== Notable works ==
- Visual Witness (2002)
- Architectural Economy of a Biennial (2012)
- Edit Your Future (2021)
