= Basim Magdy =

Egyptian artist (born 1977)

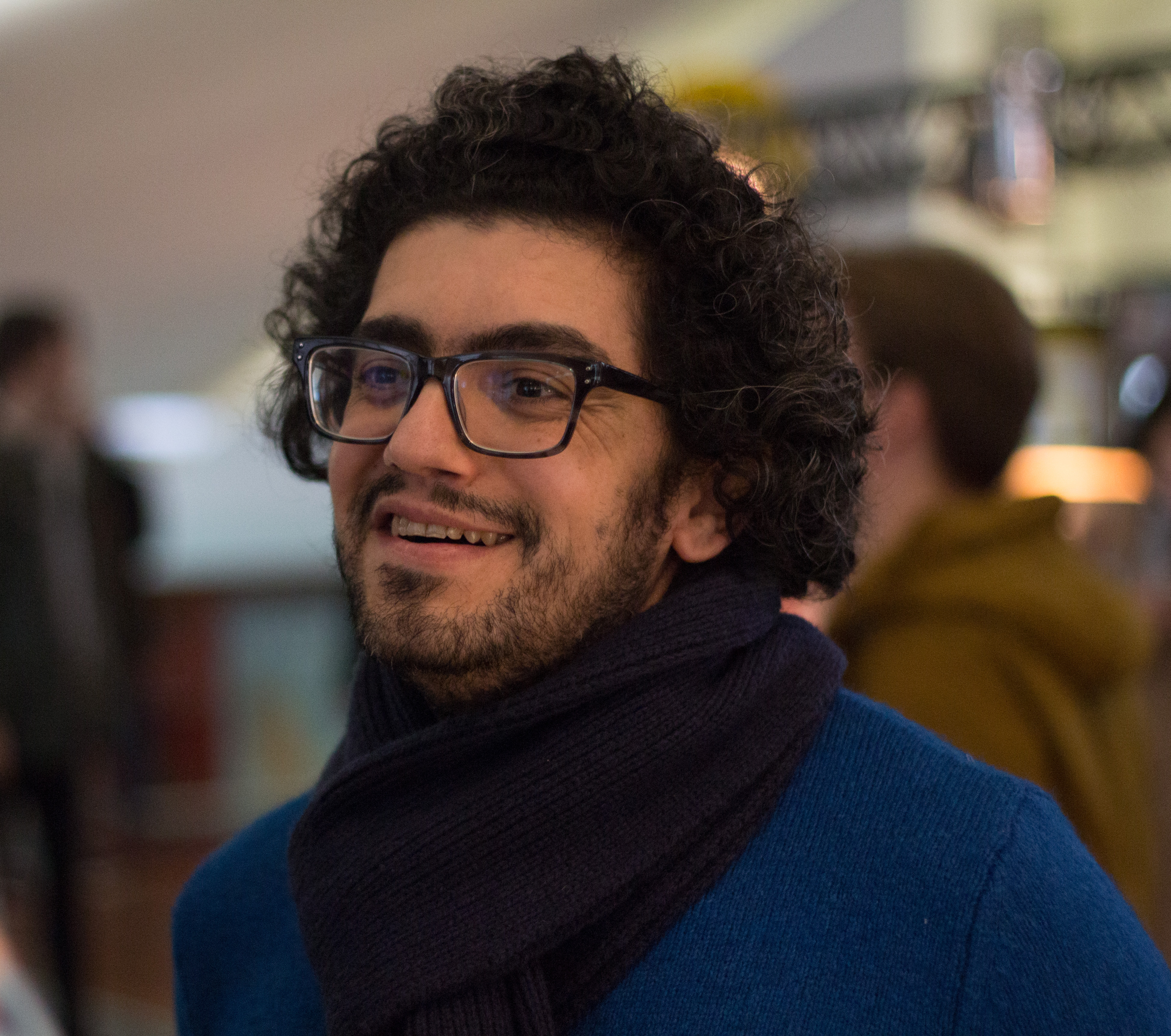
Magdy in 2017

Basim Magdy (born 1977 in Asyut) is an Egyptian-born artist living in Basel, Switzerland. His art is inspired by dream like features, including lucid dreaming. He uses ideas of process, evolution, extinction, futuristic realities, how history is written and his beliefs are includes in his work. He works with painting, filmmaking, photography, and installation. Magdy received a Bachelor of Fine Arts in painting from Helwan University in Cairo.

== Awards and honours ==
In 2016, Deutsche Bank named Magdy "Artist of the Year".

Year	Award	Sponsor/Location	Result	Ref.
2012	Future Generation Art Prize	PinchukArtCentre, Kiev	Shortlist	
2014	Abraaj Art Prize	Dubari	Winner	
2014	NEW:VISION Award	CPH:DOX Film Festival, Copenhagen	Winner	
2015	Experimental Award at the Curtas Vila do Conde	International Film Festival, Portugal	Winner	
