= Sara Greenberger Rafferty =

American multimedia artist

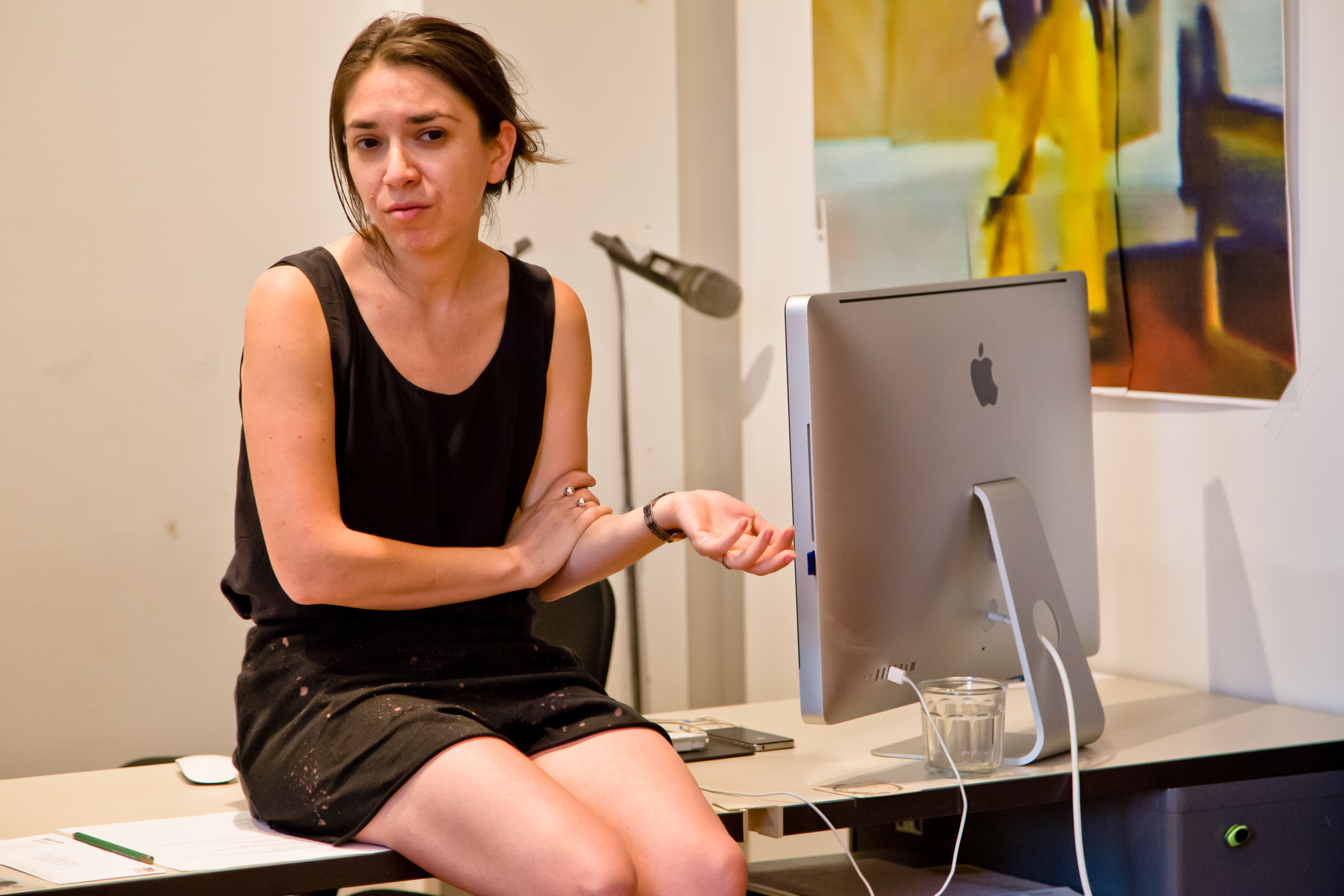
Sara Greenberger Rafferty in 2014

Sara Greenberger Rafferty (born 1978 in Evanston, Illinois), is a multimedia artist working in painting, sculpture, photography, installation and performance. Her work focuses on gender and body politics in and through comedic performance. Rafferty teaches full-time at Pratt Institute and lives and works in Brooklyn, New York. Rafferty received a B.F.A. in Photography with Honors and Art History concentration from Rhode Island School of Design (RISD) and an M.F.A. in Sculpture and New Genres from Columbia University's School of the Arts. Her work was included in the 2014 Whitney Biennial and 2014 Hammer Biennial.

== Style and works ==
Rafferty's artworks are often large in scale, though she also works on a smaller scale, as she did with the digital photo collages created on plexiglass. These works, which did not exceed 17" by 22", were exhibited at Document in Chicago in 2017. She incorporates elements from the domestic realm and pop culture, and themes of injury and death. An example of her work with pop culture is one of the plexiglass collages which "incorporates twelve index cards scanned from the Phyllis Diller "Gag File," a collection of 50,000 written jokes of Diller's. Rafferty was part of a Smithsonian Artist Research Fellowship in May 2016, and while she was at the Smithsonian, she had the opportunity to study items in the collection that were Diller's.

== Selected solo exhibitions ==
- Gloves Off. University at Albany University Art Museum (2017)
- Dead Jokes. Document, Chicago, Illinois (2016)
- New Works: Dresses and Socks. The Suburban, Oak Park, Illinois (2016)
- Riga Repair, kim? Contemporary Art Centre, Riga, Latvia (2014)
- Riga Repair, kim? Rachel Uffner Gallery, New York (2014)
- Remote. The Suburban, Oak Park, Illinois (2011)
- Bananas. The Kitchen, New York (2009)
- Tears. Rachel Uffner Gallery, New York (2009)
- Sara Greenberger Rafferty. MoMA PS 1, Queens, New York (2006).
- De/Feat and Drawings. Sandroni Rey Gallery (Los Angeles). (2006)
