= Darren Bader =

Conceptual sculptor

Darren Bader is an American conceptual artist known for works that explore the conditions under which art is produced and experienced. In a 2018 profile, Nikil Saval claimed "Bader's work, in other words, challenges and provokes the viewer to ask what precisely art is."

His practice spans sculpture, installation, instruction-based works, digital projects, and socially engaged situations.

== Early life and education ==
Darren Bader was born in Bridgeport, Connecticut, in 1978. He studied Film and Art History at New York University. He lives and works in New York City.

== Career ==
Bader's art frequently uses found materials, delegation, chance, and conceptual instructions rather than traditional fabrication.

For much of his career, Bader has made artist books and publications. His first book, James Earl Scones (2005), contains correspondences with art institutions about proposed projects. In one, he asks the director of Rome's Capitoline Museums for permission to ride naked on the famous ancient Roman equestrian statue of Marcus Aurelius, ensuring the director that “this performance is an act of sheer reverence for both the continuum of Western art and the inexorable presence of history.”

During his 2012 show at MoMA PS1, he exhibited live kittens up for adoption, and one of them was adopted under the title, "cat made out of crabmeat." His installation also included uncredited works by other artists and two non-vegetarian burritos.

In 2013, Bader received the Calder Prize, which came with a $50,000 prize, and a residency.

In 2020, Bader presented fruits, vegetables; fruit and vegetable salad, a participatory salad sculpture at the Whitney Museum of Art. In the afternoon and evening, four times a week, food items were taken from pedestals and turned into an edible salad of the artist's design.
