= Donna Huanca =

American multidisciplinary artist (born 1980)

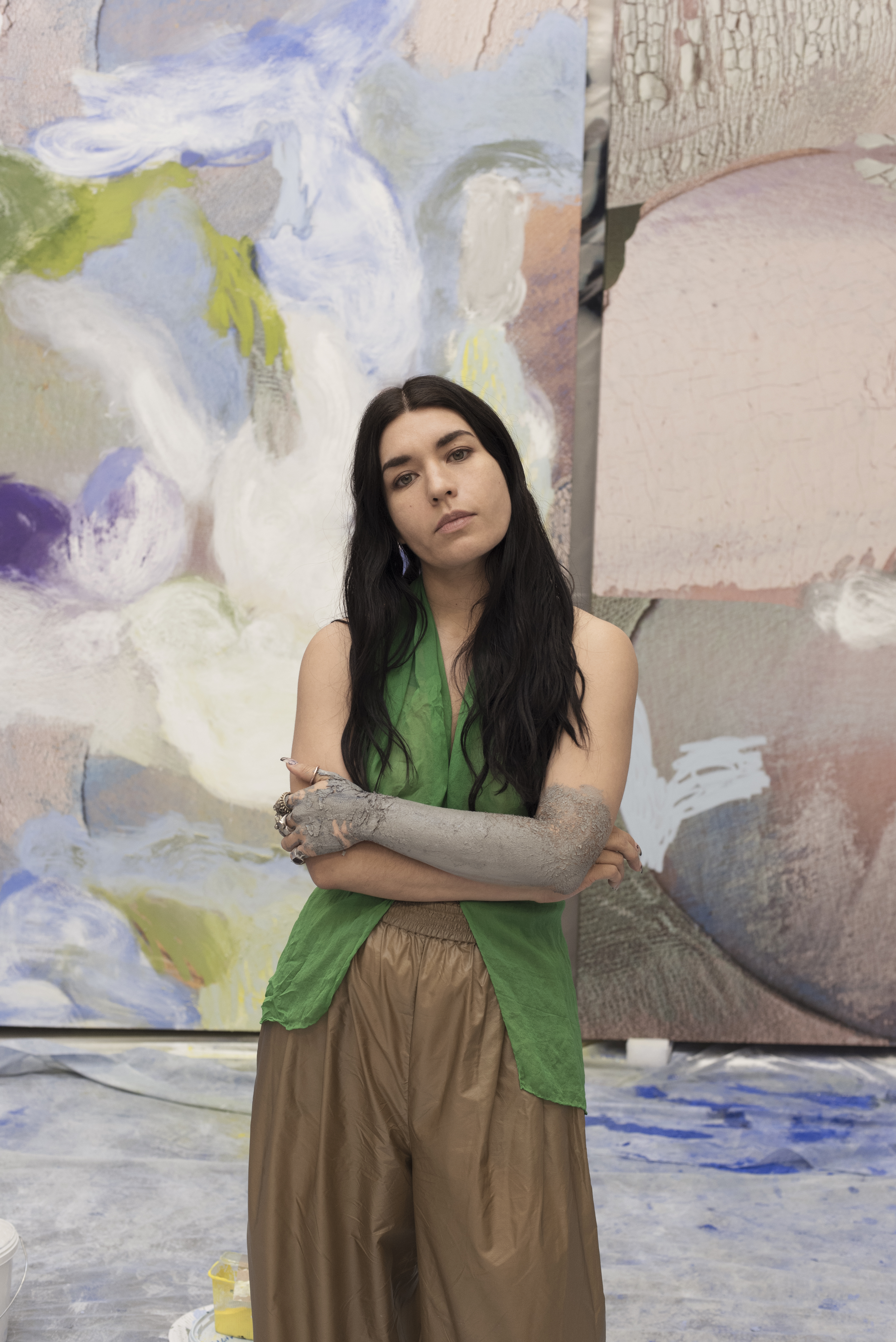
Donna Huanca, 2025

Donna Huanca (born 1980) is an American multidisciplinary artist from Chicago, Illinois, known for immersive installations that combine painting, sculpture, performance, sound, and scent. Her work explores themes of embodiment, ritual, transformation, and decolonial perspectives, often centering the human body as a site of cultural and political meaning.

Huanca’s installations draw from Indigenous Andean cosmologies, feminist theory, and speculative approaches to time and narrative. Her work has been described as situated within a lineage of feminist Latin American performance art, and has been compared to that of artists including Ana Mendieta, Teresa Margolles, and Cecilia Vicuña.

== Biography ==
Huanca was raised in Chicago, Illinois, by Bolivian parents from Santa Cruz and Potosí. During her childhood, she frequently traveled to Bolivia, particularly to attend the Festival de Urkupiña in Cochabamba. She has described these early experiences as formative influences that shaped the ritualistic and performative elements of her practice.

From 2006 to 2017, Huanca participated in artist residencies in various countries, which contributed to the development of her work across different cultural contexts.

== Education ==
Huanca received a Bachelor of Fine Arts in painting from the University of Houston in 2004. She studied at the Städelschule (Staatliche Hochschule für Bildende Künste) in Frankfurt from 2009 to 2010, and attended the Skowhegan School of Painting and Sculpture in Maine in 2006.

In 2012, she was awarded a Fulbright research grant, which enabled her to develop projects in Mexico City focused on pre-Columbian symbolism, textile traditions, and urban subcultures — themes that later became central to her practice.

== Career ==
Huanca began gaining international recognition with her early solo exhibitions in the 2010s.

== Selected exhibitions ==
- MINA DE AURA, Centro Andaluz de Arte Contemporáneo (CAAC), Seville, Spain (2025)
- UTOPIC CELLS, Faurschou Foundation, New York (2023)
- BLISS POOL, Space K, Seoul (2023)
- MAGMA SLIT, Henry Art Gallery, Seattle (2022)
- PORTAL DE PLATA, Whitechapel Gallery, London (2022, curated)
- ESPEJO QUEMADA, Ballroom Marfa, Texas (2021)
- LENGUA LLORONA, Copenhagen Contemporary (2019)
- OBSIDIAN LADDER, Marciano Art Foundation, Los Angeles (2019)
- PIEDRA QUEMADA, Belvedere Museum, Vienna, Austria (2018)

== Selected collections ==
- Whitney Museum of American Art, New York
- Solomon R. Guggenheim Museum, New York
- Rubell Museum, Miami
- Museo Nacional Centro de Arte Reina Sofía, Madrid
- Belvedere Museum, Vienna
- Yuz Museum, Shanghai
- Taguchi Art Collection, Japan

Huanca has also participated in group exhibitions including presentations at the Whitney Museum of American Art (2025), Metropolitan Museum of Manila (2024), Museum of Contemporary Art Kiasma (2022), Kunstverein in Hamburg (2021), M HKA (2020), and the Julia Stoschek Collection (2017).

In 2022, she curated Christen Sveaas Art Foundation: Portal de Plata at the Whitechapel Gallery in London, an exhibition that examined histories of mining and Indigenous knowledge systems.

In October 2025, Huanca presented a performance activation titled Donna Huanca and the Temple of Dendur at The Metropolitan Museum of Art in New York. In this work, she reimagined the ancient Egyptian temple as a living being, linking its architecture to the human body through ritual gestures and durational performance.

Her work has been reviewed and discussed in publications such as Artforum, Mousse, Artnet, Cura, Interview Magazine, Vogue, Los Angeles Times, and The New York Times.
