= Burçak Bingöl =

Visual artist (b. 1976)

- Born: 1976 (age 49–50); Görele, Turkey
- Known for: Visual art, Ceramics

Burçak Bingöl (born 1976) is a visual artist based in Istanbul. Through a labour-intensive re-working of materials and objects, she explores ideas of belonging, cultural heritage, identity, decoration and failure. Her work uses a variety of mediums including ceramics, drawings, video, photography and installation.

== Early life and education ==
Bingöl was born in Görele, Turkey, and raised in Ankara. She received a PhD in Ceramics from Hacettepe University in 2008. She also studied music at Ankara State Conservatory (1985–91) and photography at The New School in New York (2008-9).

Following her academic career, she began to focus on "rethinking the Ottoman ceramic heritage and completely devoted herself to its practice."

== Works and special projects ==
=== Broken II (2013) ===
The artist's "Broken" series uses ceramics to transform the products of mistakes, accidents, and even disasters, into products of success. Her second work in the series, Broken II (2013) entered the collection of The Metropolitan Museum of Art, New York in 2016. The work, composed of a three-dimensional square panel composed of irregularly broken pieces of stonepaste, includes a video of objects such as bottles and tiles violently dashed on the floor, which were later reassembled and decorated by the artist with colourful flower patterns connecting to centuries of traditional ceramics from the Islamic world.

According to the Metropolitan Museum of Art, "This method of deconstructing a traditional Turkish art form or medium – then reassembling it into a contemporary object calls both to the artistic Ottoman and Islamic heritage and questions the idea of "what is art?"" is Bingöl’s response to Marcel Duchamp’s concept of ready-made art.

=== Seyir (2014) ===
Seyir, a large-scale ceramic work replicating the front of a truck, is an example of the way Bingol "strips objects of their original identity and function." Using traditional tile motifs, the work was made from terracotta with the moulds of an asphalt-pouring truck in Istanbul.

=== Lady Dior (2018) ===
In 2018, Bingöl was among eleven women artists invited by the fashion house Dior to reinterpret the Lady Dior bag as part of the brand's Lady Dior Art Project.

== Exhibitions and Accolades ==
Bingöl has participated in numerous solo and group exhibitions in Turkey and overseas. In 2004 she was a guest artist in the Second International Contemporary Ceramic Sessions in Buenos Aires and Obera. In 2006, Bingöl produced a solo exhibition “Syste-matic” at the end of an artist residency at Hunter College in New York. In 2007 she received an honorable mention award for her work “Constant Variable” in the International Miniature Ceramic Competition Exhibition in Zagreb, Croatia.

Other solo exhibitions include 'Feeling the Blanks', Turkish Embassy Gallery, New York (2009);" 'Cabinet of Curiosities', Cda-Projects, Istanbul (2011); "A Carriage Affair', Galeri Zilberman, İstanbul, (2014).

== Museum collections ==
Bingöl's works are in the museum collections of The Metropolitan Museum of Art, New York; 21C Museum, Kentucky; Salsali Private Museum, Dubai; and Baksı Museum, Bayburt, Turkey.
