= Elle Pérez =

American photographer

Elle Pérez (born 1989) is an American photographer whose work explores gender identity, intimacy, vulnerability, and the relationship between seeing and love. Pérez is a gender non-conforming trans artist. They are currently an Assistant Professor of Art, Film, and Visual Studies at Harvard University. Pérez is represented by 47 Canal and currently lives and works in New York City.

In 2019, Pérez was featured in Cultured Magazine's "30 Under 35" and in Forbes's "30 Under 30". Pérez's work was included in the 2019 Whitney Biennial.

== Early life and education ==
Pérez is of Puerto Rican descent and grew up in the Bronx, New York City. In 2002, at the age of twelve, Pérez began photographing the Bronx punk community that they were a part of, creating an archive of the people that shaped these peripheral, alternative, and genderqueer spaces.

Pérez holds a BFA in Photography from Maryland Institute College of Art and an MFA in Photography from Yale School of Art. They attended the Skowhegan School of Painting and Sculpture.

== Work ==
In 2014 and 2015 Pérez photographed queer and punk spaces such as Euforia Latina, the name for latin night at Club Hippo in Baltimore, MD and Bronx Underground, a punk show at the First Lutheran Church of Throgs Neck, in the Bronx, both of which have since closed. Pérez's photographs chronicle these spaces of queer liberation. In these nightclub photographs, "Pérez, working in settings of emotional familiarity, takes her subjects, their queerness, and their blackness and brownness for granted. By doing so, [they] recenter all LGBT individuals as normative, everyday, and utterly beautiful."

While a graduate student at Yale in 2015 they began a series titled "Raw," photographs of the Black and Latino wrestlers of the Bronx underground wrestling scene. Pérez was interested in how wrestlers create personas to experiment with new identities, and specifically identities that may not be accessible to them in everyday life. In an interview with The Fader about this series they state, "I think wrestling is important for people in my community who are denied certain types of identities and can't be anyone they want in the "real" world. You can be anyone you want in the ring."

As expressed in MoMA PS1's press release, on the occasion of the artist's first museum solo exhibition, Diablo, "Pérez's photographs distill moments of intimacy and emotional exchange: a bloody hand resting between parted legs; the scar gracing a bare chest; twinned rocks nestled against an outcropping; a friend's face grazed by sunlight."

Pérez's In Bloom solo exhibition at 47 Canal in 2018 comprised nine photographs and marked a departure from earlier images documenting queer public spaces to Pérez's own private and intimate spaces, including the apartment of their partner, Ian. The pictures in this show contain "codes of desire" legible to LGBTQ communities, but obscure to outsiders.

== Academic career ==
They were formerly a visiting professor at the Rhode Island School of Design, Williams College and Cooper Union, a critic at the Yale School of Art, and a dean at the Skowhegan School of Painting and Sculpture. They are currently an Assistant Professor of Art, Film, and Visual Studies at Harvard University.

== Exhibitions ==
=== Solo exhibitions ===
- 2018 – In Bloom, 47 Canal, New York City
- 2018 – Diablo, MoMA PS1, New York City
- 2021 – Forum 84, Carnegie Museum of Art, Pittsburgh, PA

=== Group exhibitions ===
- 2018 – This is Not a Prop, David Zwirner Gallery, New York City
- 2018 – Intimacy, Yossi Milo Gallery, New York City
- 2018 – Everyday Muse, LTD Gallery, Los Angeles
- 2019 – Whitney Biennial, Whitney Museum of American Art, New York City
- 2019 – Nobody Promised You Tomorrow: Contemporary Art in the 50th Year of the Stonewall Era (2019), Brooklyn Museum, New York City
