= Josh Kline (artist) =

American artist and curator

Josh Kline (born 1979 in Philadelphia, Pennsylvania, United States) is an American artist and curator living and working in New York City. Josh Kline is represented by 47 Canal, Lisson Gallery, and Modern Art.

He participated in the 2019 Whitney Biennial. In 2023, The Whitney Museum of American Art hosted a solo exhibition of Kline's work titled Project for a New American Century. The exhibition featured the installation works Contagious Unemployment and Civil War. In these works, he utilized technology, digitization, and image manipulation to address the influence of political and social issues on people who make up the labor force.

== Work ==
Kline's first solo gallery exhibition was held at 47 Canal in 2011. In 2014, his work Skittles was displayed along the High Line in the borough of Manhattan in New York City. In 2015 His installation Freedom (a series of teletubby statues in SWAT gear with video monitors) was included in the 2015 New Museum Triennial, Surround Audience, and later in his survey at the Whitney Museum. These sculptures also feature monitors embedded in the chests of the sculptures, playing video inspired by the Occupy Wall Street protests, in which the artist participated. The piece gained widespread attention and acclaim in the art press.

In 2015, his piece Cost of Living (Aleyda) (2014) was included in America is Hard to See, the opening exhibition of the new Whitney Museum of American Art facility in the Meatpacking area of Manhattan, which was composed entirely of works from their permanent collection.

In 2026, he wrote an article published in the academic journal October titled "New York Real Estate and the Ruin of American Art." It argued that staggering prices and rents for commercial and residential real estate in New York City have had a negative effect on the art industry, drawing on history and his own personal experience as an artist and arts administrator. It was subsequently the subject of much discussion and critique by other artists and writers.

== Notable exhibitions ==
Group exhibitions

- 2015 Triennial: Surround Audience, New Museum, New York, February 25 – May 24, 2015.
- America is Hard to See, Whitney Museum of American Art, New York, May 1 – September 27, 2015.
- New Order, Museum of Modern Art, New York, March 17–June 15, 2019.

Whitney Biennial 2019, Whitney Museum of American Art, New York, May 17 – October 27, 2019.

Solo exhibitions

- Freedom, Modern Art Oxford, Oxford, England, August 22 – October 18, 2015.
- Josh Kline: Project for a New American Century, Whitney Museum of American Art, New York, April 19 – August 13, 2023.
