= Frasconi =

Frasconi is an Italian surname. Notable people with the surname include:

- Antonio Frasconi (1919–2013), Uruguayan-American artist
- Miguel Frasconi (born 1956), American composer
- Pablo Frasconi (born 1952), American film director
