= Experimental Television Center =

Nonprofit media arts organization

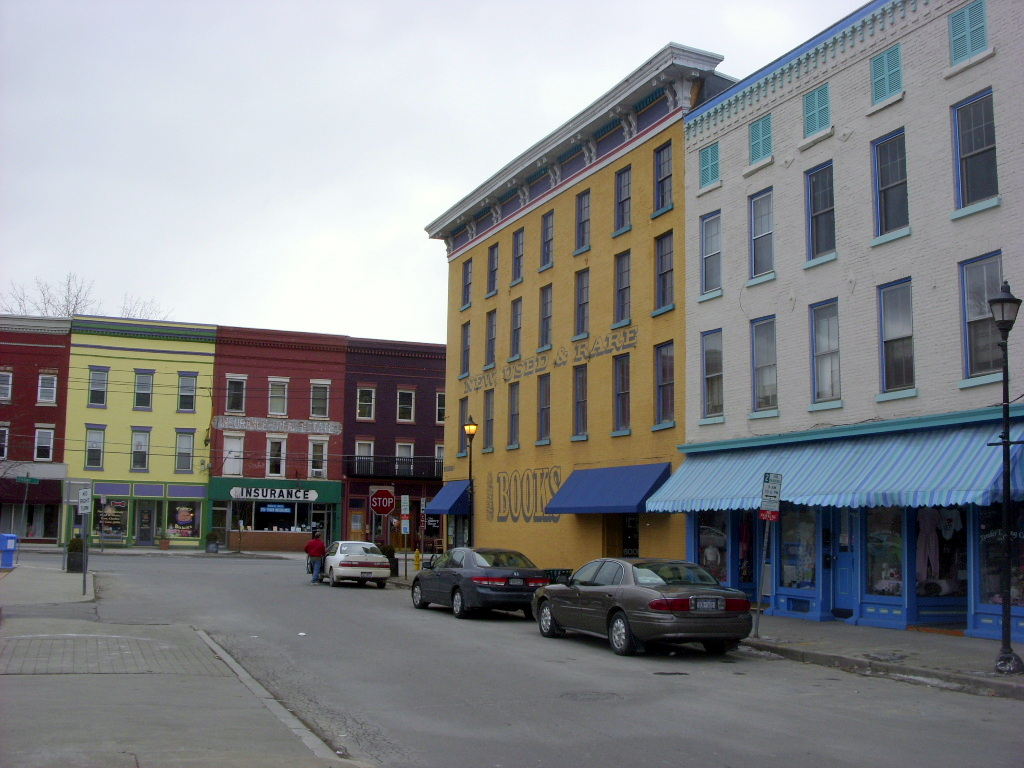
- Riverow Owego Central Historic District

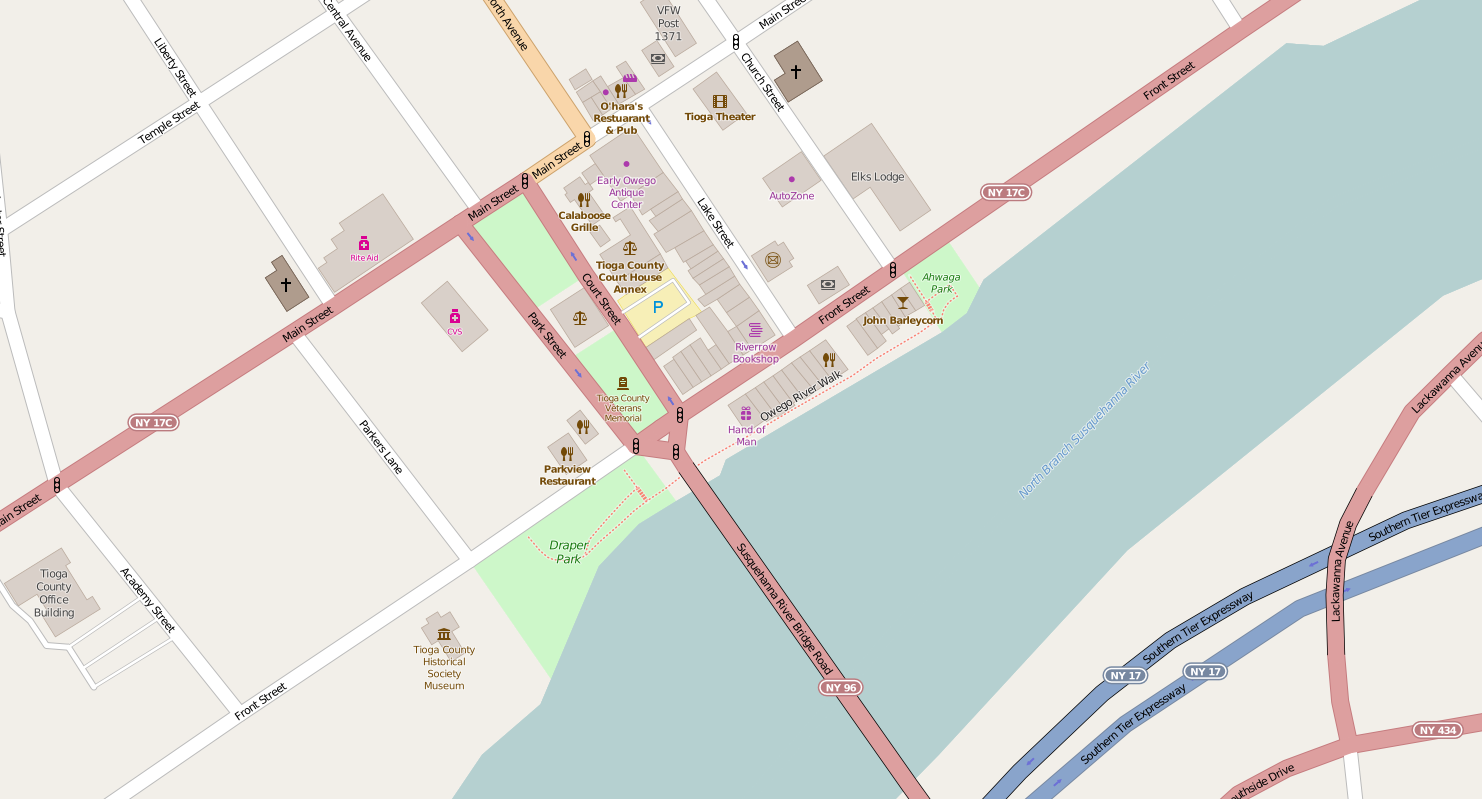
- Owego Map
- Formation: 1969 (established), 1971 (founded date)
- Founder: Ralph Hocking
- Founded at: Binghamton
- Merger of: Student Experiments in Television project on the campus of Binghamton University (1969)
- Type: Nonprofit
- Registration no.: 16-0993211
- Location(s): 180 Front Street, Owego, New York, USA.
- Coordinates: 42.102103°N 76.261031°W
- Region served: Owego
- Key people: Ralph Hocking (Director); Sherry Miller Hocking (Assistant Director); Dave Jones (Systems Consultant); Hank Rudolph (Program Coordinator); Peer Bode (Program Coordinator)

Experimental Television Center is a 501(c)(3) nonprofit electronic and media art center.

== History ==
The Experimental Television Center (ETC) was founded in 1971 by Ralph Hocking. The center was the result of the expansion of a media access program that Ralph Hocking established as professor of video and computer art at Binghamton University in 1969. In July 1979, the center moved from Binghamton to Owego, New York.

The ETC, directed by Ralph Hocking and Sherry Miller Hocking, is devoted to the exploration and development of potential uses of new technology in video and media art. Artists, organizations, and interested individuals were provided access to custom, innovative image processing tools. Complete use of the equipment and studio facilities was provided at no charge.

The Center for more than 40 years offered a residency program, that emphasized the aesthetic experimentation of electronic and media art though new technologies. Artists and students from around the world worked with rare and unique analog and digital devices for creating video artworks and had access to the media art library of the center, largely consisting of video works created by prior participants. For Ralph Hocking, the center was "a learning place [...], where artists and engineers worked in tandem". In addition, the center organized exhibitions, workshops, cultural events, conferences and provided grand programs to support artists and non-profit media art programs.

In 2011, the Residency and Grants Program of the center was paused to focus on preservation efforts. The center’s media arts collection has since been archived and housed at the Rose Goldsen Archive of New Media Art through Cornell University Library’s Division of Rare and Manuscript Collections.

The center's Video History Project, an ongoing research initiative, offers a wealth of often unpublished documents related to the early historical development of video art and community television, with a particular focus on upstate New York during the period 1968–1980.

In 2021, ETC announced its relocation to Atlanta, Georgia.

== Artists ==
Some of the artists that have been active in the Experimental Television Center include:

- Anney Bonney
- Benton C Bainbridge
- Irit Batsry
- Alan Berliner
- Peer Bode
- Abigail Child
- Connie Coleman and Alan Powell
- Peter D'Agostino
- Marcello Dantas
- Emergency Broadcast Network
- Laurence Gartel
- Ariana Gerstein
- Leah Gilliam
- Shalom Gorewitz
- Slawomir Grunberg
- Barbara Hammer
- Thomas Allen Harris
- Pamela Susan Hawkins
- Sorrel Hays
- Kathy High
- Gary Hill
- Sara Hornbacher
- Amy Jenkins
- Ken Jacobs
- Richard Kostelanetz
- Shigeko Kubota
- Annie Langan
- Jeffrey Lerer
- Jeanne Liotta
- LoVid (Tali Hinkis and Kyle Lapidus)
- Mary Magsamen
- Jennifer and Kevin McCoy
- Jillian McDonald
- Christina McPhee
- Jeffrey Martin
- Michael Pope (Neovoxer)
- Nam June Paik
- Ron Rocco
- Barbara Rosenthal
- Eric Rosenzveig
- Lynne Sachs
- Matthew Schlanger
- Alan Sondheim
- Aldo Tambellini
- Simon Tarr
- Nancy Meli Walker
- Sheri Wills
- Walter Wright
- Neil Zusman

== Tools ==
One of the early projects at the center (1972), a research program aiming to develop a more flexible set of imaging tools for artists, involved the construction of the "Paik/Abe video synthesizer". This video synthesizer was designed by Shuya Abe and Nam June Paik and built at the center by David Jones and Robert Diamond, for the TV Lab at WNET-TV. The project was funded by the New York State Council on the Arts.

In the early 1970s, the center was the home to many innovative tools that artists in residency took advantage of to make complex and technologically progressive artworks. The "Abe colorizer" for example, "an image processing device, was the precursor of many of special effects that nowadays are taken for granted", as Bill T. Jones pointed out. In addition, the "Rutt/Etra scan processor" was part of the ETC studio and invented by Steve Rutt and Bill Etra in the early 1970s. Gary Hill, artist-in-residence at the Experimental Television Center from 1975 to 1977, explained that this scan processor "allowed one to manipulate the video image, providing an enormous amount of flexibility in altering a video input or in generating new images by using other inputs like waveforms".

In 1973, the center started a long-term collaboration with the artist and engineer Dave Jones, who was repairing, modifying and building video equipment for the center. After becoming the ETC’s full-time technician, Jones designed a series of tools for video image processing to be used at the Center by a number of video artists. Some of the tools available in the ETC studio included the "Jones colorizer" (1974, 1975), the "Jones 8-input sequencer" (1984, 1985), the "Jones keyer" (1985), the "Jones buffer" (1986), the "Voltage control", and the "Raster manipulation unit–wobbulator".

In mid-1970s, the center started to research the interface of an "LSI-11 computer" with a video processing system with the collaboration of Steina and Woody Vasulka and the support of National Endowment for the Arts (NEA). Its purpose was to make a digital imaging system more user-friendly to the artists. In the late of 1970s and the beginning of 1980s, the ETC’s research programs shifted from the hardware building to artist-oriented software development and to completing new and old tools and systems.

In the 1980s, the center embraced the Amiga computer. In the 1990s, the available image processing system was enriched by commercially available tools. According to Ralph and Sherry Miller Hocking, the image processing system became through the years “a hybrid tool set, permitting the artist to create interactive relationships between older historically analog instruments and new digital technologies”.
