= Virginia Intermont College =

Private college in Bristol, Virginia (1854–2014)

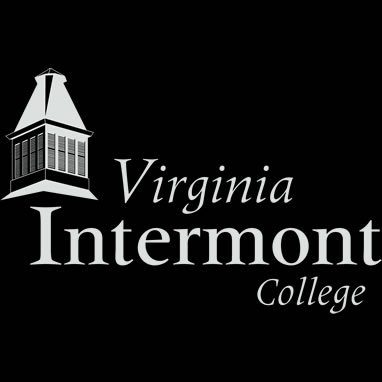
- Former names: Southwest Virginia Institute (1884–1893); Virginia Institute (1893–1908)
- Motto: Nil sine numine
- Motto in English: Nothing without Guidance
- Type: Private college
- Active: 1884–2014
- Endowment: $4 million (as of 2011)
- Chairman: Kathleen O'Brien
- President: Art Rebrovick
- Provost: Dr. Cynthia Ward
- Faculty: 45 (as of 2011)
- Students: 591 (as of 2011)
- Location: Bristol, Virginia, United States; 36°36′18″N 82°10′35″W
- Campus: 147 acres (59 ha); Suburban
- Colors: Black & Vegas gold
- Nickname: Cobras
- Sporting affiliations: NAIA – Appalachian (until 2014)
- Website: www.vic.edu/
- Virginia Intermont College
- U.S. National Register of Historic Places
- Location within Virginia
- Location: Moore and Harmeling Sts., Bristol, Virginia
- Coordinates: 36°36′18″N 82°10′35″W
- Area: 5 acres (2.0 ha)
- Built: 1891
- Architect: Tinsley, Walter P.
- Architectural style: Late Victorian
- NRHP reference No.: 84000032
- Added to NRHP: October 4, 1984

Virginia Intermont College (VI) was a private college in Bristol, Virginia, United States. It was founded in 1884 to create additional educational opportunities for women. The college became coeducational in 1972. It experienced significant financial difficulties during the last years of its existence, was denied accreditation in 2013, and announced its closure on May 20, 2014.

The name "Intermont" was a reference to the college's mountain setting. Holston Mountain, part of the Blue Ridge Mountains, can be seen from the campus in Bristol, Virginia, part of the Tri-Cities region, which also includes Johnson City and Kingsport, Tennessee.

After years of being shuttered and a failed attempt to reopen a business college, the campus suffered a devastating fire in the early morning hours of Friday, December 20, 2024, that resulted in the complete loss of the original core buildings.

== History ==
The college was founded as Southwest Virginia Institute in Glade Spring, Virginia, on September 17, 1884, by Reverend J.R. Harrison, a Baptist minister, as a means to bring higher education opportunities to women in southwest Virginia. Instructing both boarding and day students, the school steadily grew until it outgrew its facilities in less than ten years.

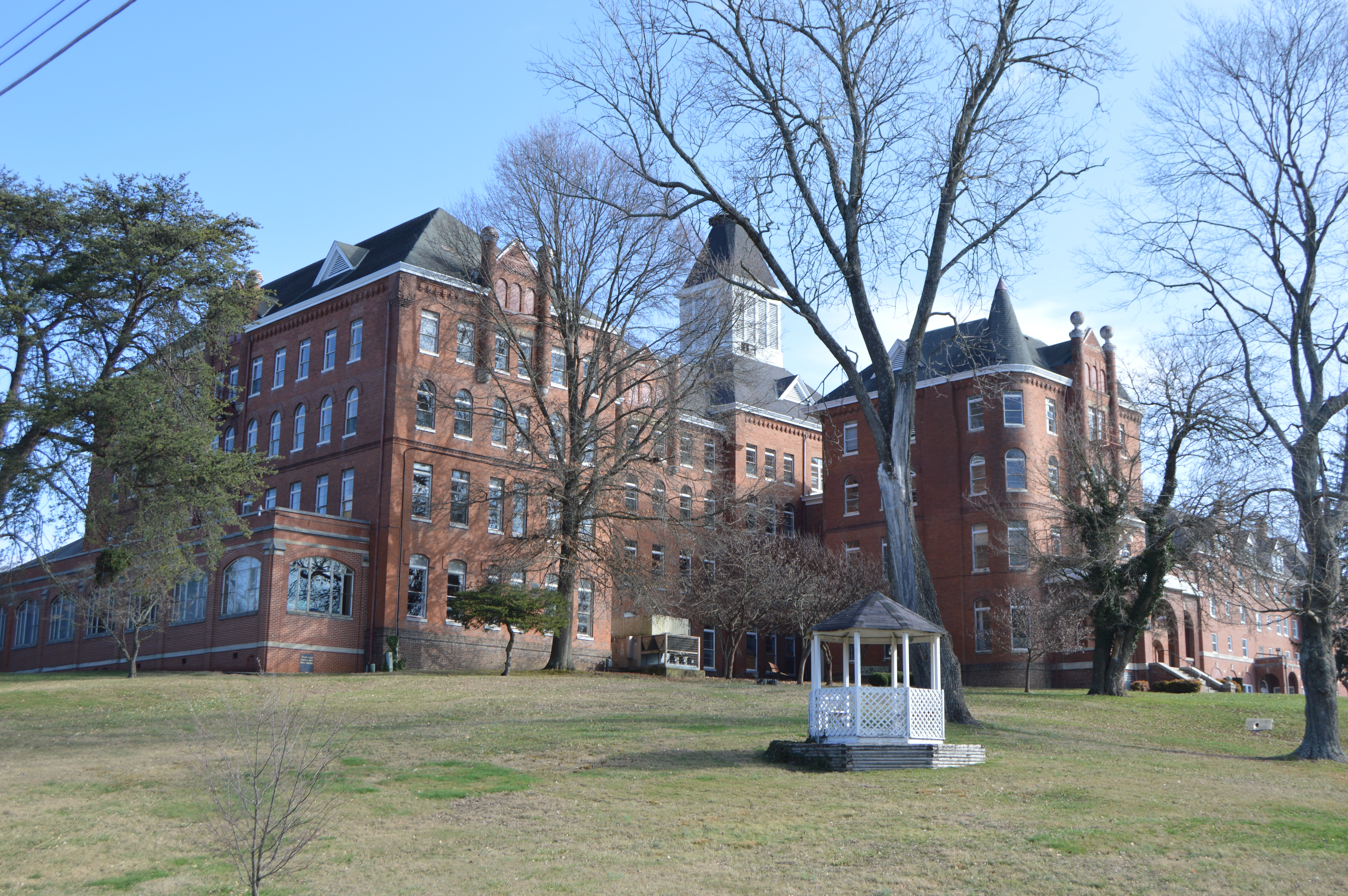
Main building, seen from southwest

The college began moving to a new site in Bristol, Virginia, in 1891, completing its relocation with the beginning of classes on September 14, 1893. Shortly after the move, the name was changed to Virginia Institute, then to Virginia Intermont College in 1908. A reorganization of the curriculum in 1910 brought the college into the junior college movement and the college became the first two-year institution to be accredited by the Southern Association of Colleges and Schools.

During the 1960s, five new buildings were constructed to accommodate the school's growth. In the early 1970s, Virginia Intermont became a four-year institution granting baccalaureate degrees. 1972 marked another major milestone as VI admitted men and became a coeducational institution.

In July 2010, the college hired its first female president, Dr. E. Clorisa Phillips, who came to VI following 30 years in administration at the University of Virginia. Phillips worked on fundraising initiatives for ongoing renovations and upgrades to the historic campus, and added academic and athletic programs for the 2012–13 academic year. However, her leadership led to catastrophic failure and the ultimate collapse of the institution after 130 years.

=== Decline and closure ===
In January 2014, faced with declining enrollment, the college announced plans to merge with Webber International University in Babson Park, Florida, but this measure failed in April. On May 4, 2014, faculty president, Dr. Robert Rainwater announced during the 2014 graduation ceremony, that VI would close its doors after 130 years of education in the community. Just one day after the 2014 graduation, the board of trustees accepted the resignation of President Clorisa Phillips. A statement issued by the college said Phillips stepped down for personal reasons. She served as president for nearly four years. The board of trustees placed the day-to-day leadership of the college with Compass Executives of Nashville with Art Rebrovick serving as interim president and restructuring agent. The college set up teach out programs so it might be possible for students to complete their undergraduate educations with other colleges.

On June 1, 2014, Virginia Intermont released custodianship of student academic records to King University for the purpose of issuing official academic transcripts.

=== Sale of campus ===
Bluefield College expressed interest in purchasing the property, but backed out when inspections indicated there was $20 million in deferred maintenance to the buildings. In December 2016, the campus was sold for $3.3 million to Chinese businessman George Xu, as a representative for U.S. Magis International Education Center, a New York-based Chinese owned company. Magis intended to open it as a college at a future date. A health-care concern had reportedly agreed to pay a far higher price for the property, but the bank proceeded to auction the property, closing out the prospective buyer. An aggregate of over $5 million in salaries to faculty and staff remain unpaid.

=== Fire ===
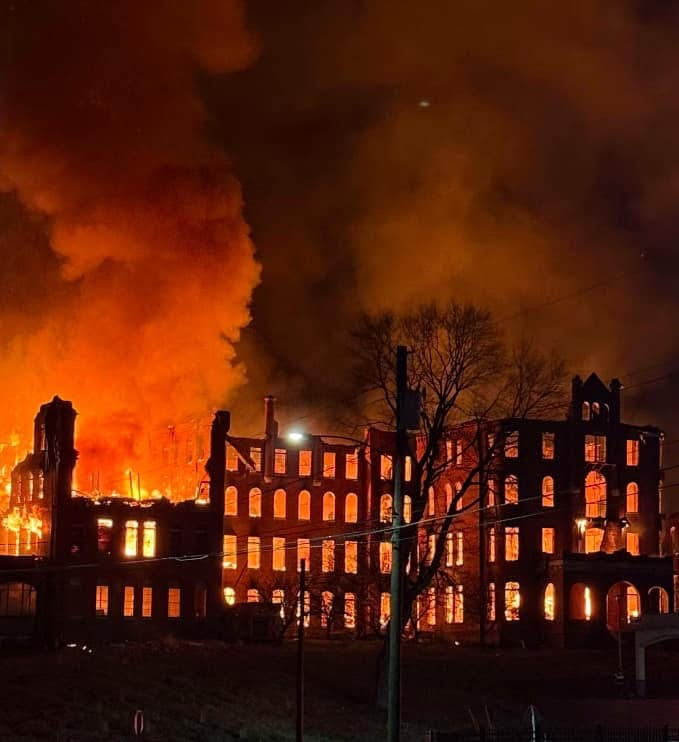
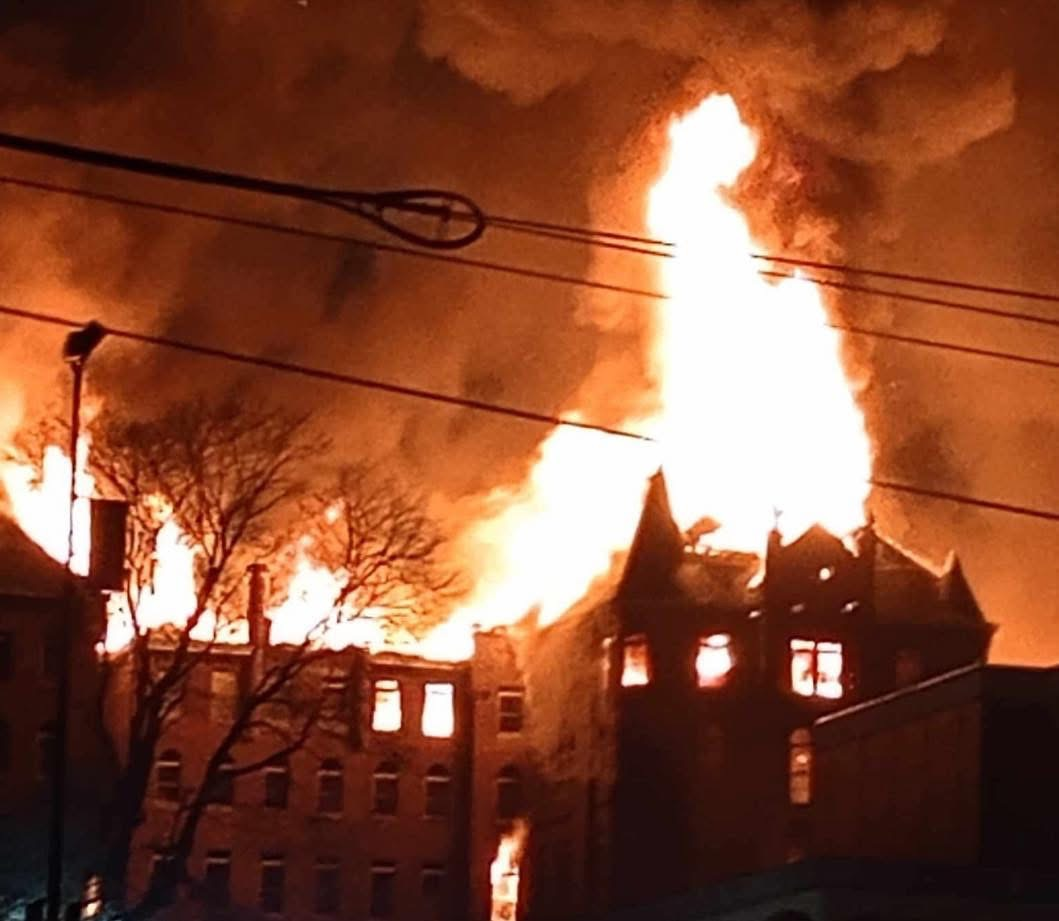
Pictures of the December 20, 2024 fire

On December 20, 2024, at approximately 1:00 a.m. Eastern Standard Time, the college campus was devastated by fire. By 6:00 a.m., Main Hall, West Hall, East Hall, and the Administration building had been destroyed in the blaze. Timber joists, floors, and a lack of functioning sprinkler system contributed to the spread. Crews from more than twelve nearby fire departments worked to contain the fire and to prevent embers from igniting nearby Hodges Hall and adjacent houses.

== Accreditation ==
Virginia Intermont College was accredited by the Commission on Colleges of the Southern Association of Colleges and Schools (SACS) to award the Bachelor of Arts, Bachelor of Fine Arts, Bachelor of Science and Bachelor of Social Work. Virginia Intermont's accreditation was reaffirmed in early December 2011, but the college was issued a one-year warning for not meeting the agency's financial standards. In December 2012, the college's accreditation was not renewed and the college was placed on probation for six months. At the end of that review period, the SACS board of trustees recommended the college be removed from SACS membership for failure to "comply with requirements for financial resources and stability". The college appealed and won a temporary court injunction to retain its accreditation albeit in a probationary status.

== Campus ==
The original campus buildings built between 1891 and 1893 consisted of the main hall (which featured a dining hall, room for 200 boarders, a gymnasium, and indoor pool) as well as a fine arts building and two out buildings which housed classrooms. The original structure, which only consists of the main hall today, was added to the National Register of Historic Places on October 4, 1984. The first major addition to the school was in the early 1920s, when Hodges Hall and the current president's home were constructed. These were followed by the construction of what is currently known as East Hall in 1922. The gymnasium was built in 1930 which was followed shortly by the Library and the Humanities building. No further major construction would take place until the early 1960s when Intermont Hall, Science Hall, the student center, Harrison-Jones Auditorium, and the Worrell Fine Arts Center were constructed.

In summer 2011, VI's largest classroom building, Science Hall, was renovated, adding state-of-the-art labs and equipment. Updates and renovations were made in the West and Main bathrooms, and air-conditioning was added in the recital hall and theater. All of the sidewalks on campus were re-constructed in 2011–12. The college was formulating a master plan for further campus renovations and campus upgrades.

== Buildings ==
The campus of Virginia Intermont was eight blocks from downtown Bristol. Campus buildings were a blend of modern and historic structures. Major buildings and facilities are described below.

- The Turner Student Center, completed in 1959, is named for Dr. Floyd V. Turner, president of Virginia Intermont from 1956 to 1979.
- The Worrell Fine Arts Center was completed in 1961. The center contains the Dorothy Cigrand Trayer Theatre. The Recital Hall contains a three-manual Moller organ. Theatre and Recital hall were air-conditioned in summer 2011.
- The Science Hall was completed in the spring of 1963 and was completely updated in fall 1999. It was again renovated in summer 2011.
- The J. Henry Kegley Center is an amphitheatre-style lecture hall.
- The Humanities and Social Sciences Building is a three-story classroom and faculty office building.
- Harrison-Jones Memorial Hall, completed in 1967, serves as a chapel-auditorium. It seats 982 people in the air-conditioned space, which also houses the college's Flentrop organ. The structure is named for the Rev. J. R. Harrison, founder of the college, and his son-in-law, S. D. Jones, Intermont president from 1889 to 1898.
- The J. Henry Kegley Auditorium is inside Harrison Jones Memorial Hall.
- The Virginia Ruth Hutton Blevins Art Building was donated to the college in 1997 and renovated in 1998.
- The Arnold House, on the corner of Moore and Intermont Drive, is a former family residence that was donated by Bristol businessmen Jack and Joe Arnold.
- Student housing is concentrated in the following buildings: The Main Complex, Hodges Hall, East Hall, Intermont Hall, Prader Hall, and West Hall.
- The Smith-Canter Gymnasium, built in 1928, is named for Mary Lou Smith, an alumna and long-time faculty member of the college, and Virginia Canter, who served as a faculty member and later registrar before her retirement
- The J. F. Hicks Memorial Library houses a traditional print collection and provides access to many electronic resources. The library has over 160,000 items listed in the Appalachian College Association catalog, which is shared with 26 other association members. Approximately 55,000 of these items are print materials contained in the library, while online access is provided to over 97,000 electronic books.
- The Old Manse houses classrooms, faculty offices for the English department, and the Writing Center. The Writing Center was funded in 1995 by the Jessie Ball du Pont Foundation.
- The Riding Center is located six miles (10 km) from the main campus, just off Exit 10 of Interstate 81. It has two indoor rings, one outdoor ring, four wash stalls, and plenty of turnout paddocks. The barn has had numerous updates over the past four years, such as new roofing, new siding, new floors in the stalls, new railing in both indoors.
- The Intermont Photography Lab houses separate laboratories for black and white and color processing and printing as well as a laboratory for experimental processes and specialized techniques.
- The Math Lab is in the Science Hall.
- Van Dyke–Davis Alumni House is on Moore Street. It is named after Mary Van Dyke ‘44 and Mary Coomer Davis ‘47; they helped organize the donation of all the furniture, which is of the period.

Additional facilities include an outdoor amphitheater.

== Organization ==
The college was governed by a president, provost, and a board of trustees. Its programs were organized into four divisions: Arts and Sciences, Fine Arts, Pre-Professional Studies (Pre-Law, Pre-Med, and Pre-Vet), and Business Administration. Programs of study leading to the Bachelor of Arts, Bachelor of Fine Arts, Bachelor of Science, and Bachelor of Social Work were offered.

== Athletics ==
The Virginia Intermont athletic teams were called the Cobras. The college was a member of the National Association of Intercollegiate Athletics (NAIA), primarily competing in the Appalachian Athletic Conference (AAC) from 2001–02 to 2013–14.

Virginia Intermont competed in nine intercollegiate varsity sports. Men's sports included baseball, basketball, golf, and soccer; women's sports included basketball, soccer, softball, and volleyball; and co-ed sports included cycling. Other sports were men's & women's cross country, men's tennis, and men's & women's track & field.

The men's cross-country program won the NAIA National Championships three years in row, from 2004 to 2006.

Virginia Intermont fielded equestrian teams in competitions affiliated with the Intercollegiate Horse Show Association (IHSA), the Intercollegiate Dressage Association (IDA), and the International Intercollegiate Equestrian Association (IIEA). VI equestrian teams had a long history of competitive success with more than 15 national championships. The riding program, along with the college's top-rated equine studies program, attracted students from across the U.S.

On April 16, 2014, Virginia Intermont announced that it was discontinuing support for athletics. Emory & Henry College acquired the assets of the program in June 2014.

== School traditions ==
The college's long-held tradition of May Day eventually transitioned to May Court, a time to recognize seniors selected by their classmates for an honor court which occurred each year during graduation festivities.

Another spring tradition was the Torchlight ceremony, which took place after baccalaureate. Graduates marched around the campus and one by one had a torch lit by the president. The group then formed the college below Harrison-Jones Memorial Hall and sang the college song, "Nil Sine Numine." This song was written by students in 1952 as part of a tradition for students of writing and competing with a song demonstrating pride in the institution. The music for the song was taken from a song called "The Gaudeamus" which was sung in the musical The Student Prince. The school songwriting tradition ended when the school became coeducational in 1972.

== Alumni ==
- Preston Gannaway (2000), 2008 Pulitzer Prize for Feature Photography
- Helen Ruth Henderson, member of the Virginia House of Delegates
- Robert Ssejjemba (2004), professional soccer player

== Faculty ==
- Alice Righter Edmiston, artist
- Martha Zelt, printmaker, chaired the Department of Art from 1985 to 1989
