= Martha Zelt =

American visual artist (1930–2023)

- Born: November 16, 1930; Washington, Pennsylvania, United States
- Died: May 11, 2023 (aged 92)
- Other names: Martha Zelt Staunton, Martie Zelt, Marty Zelt
- Education: Temple University (BA); Connecticut College; Pennsylvania Academy of the Fine Arts; The New School; University of New Mexico

Martha Zelt (November 16, 1930 – May 11, 2023) was an American printmaker, painter, and educator. She taught printmaking at the Pennsylvania Academy of the Fine Arts, and the Philadelphia College of the Arts (later known as the University of the Arts).

== Biography ==
Martha Zelt was born in November 16, 1930, in Washington, Pennsylvania. She graduated from East Washington High School in 1948.

Zelt received her bachelor's degree from Temple University. Other institutions at which she studied include Connecticut College; the Pennsylvania Academy of the Fine Arts in Philadelphia; the New School for Social Research in New York City, under Antonio Frasconi; the Museum of Modern Art of São Paulo, under Johnny Friedlaender; and the University of New Mexico, under Garo Antreasian.

Her work has appeared in many group exhibitions in the United States and elsewhere, and her work is represented in the collections of the Brooklyn Museum of Art, the Carnegie Museum of Art, the Pennsylvania Academy of the Fine Arts, the Philadelphia Museum of Art, Princeton University, and the Smithsonian American Art Museum.

Among awards which she has received are the Cresson Traveling Scholarship for 1954 and the Scheidt memorial travelling award from the Pennsylvania Academy of the Fine Arts, a 1965 fellowship from Philadelphia's Print Club, and a 1982 grant from the Roswell Museum and Art Center in New Mexico.

As an instructor she has taught at the Pennsylvania Academy of the Fine Arts, from 1968 to 1982; the Philadelphia College of the Arts (later known as the University of the Arts), from 1969 to 1982; and the University of North Carolina at Chapel Hill, in 1981. She chaired the art department of Virginia Intermont College from 1985 to 1989; and was a visiting professor at the University of Delaware from 1989 to 1990.

Zelt died on May 11, 2023, at the age of 92.
