= Peter D'Agostino =

American artist

- Born: November 22, 1945 (age 80); New York City, New York, U.S.
- Education: School of Visual Arts (BFA); San Francisco State University (MA)
- Employer: Temple University
- Known for: Video art; New media art; Photography; Interactive media
- Notable work: Roof/Passage (1973–74); Telecommunication (WORLD-WIDE-WEB) (1995)
- Movement: Conceptual art
- Awards: Guggenheim Fellowship; National Endowment for the Arts Fellowships; Pew Fellowships in the Arts
- Website: www.peterdagostino.com

Peter d'Agostino (New York, NY, 1945 ) is an American artist and professor emeritus of Film and Media Arts, Temple University, Philadelphia.

== Life ==
Surveys of his work include: Peter d'Agostino: COLD / HOT-Walks, Wars & Climate Change, Muhlenberg College, PA; World-Wide-Walks / between earth & sky / 1973- 2012, UPV / EHU Art Gallery, Bilbao, Spain; Between Earth & Sky: MX (1973-2007), Laboratorio Arte Alemeda, Mexico City; Between Earth & Sky, 1973/2003, University of Paris I Pantheon-Sorbonne; Interactivity and Intervention, 1978–99, Lehman College Art Gallery, New York. Major group exhibitions include: Whitney Museum of American Art (Biennial, and The American Century - Film and Video in America 1950–2000); São Paulo Bienal, Brazil; Kwangju Biennial, Korea; California Video, Getty Museum, Los Angeles; Under the Big Black Sun, MOCA, LA; State of Mind: New California Art Circa 1970, ICI, NY traveling exhibition. His works are in the collections of: The Museum of Modern Art, New York; San Francisco Museum of Modern Art; Kunsthaus, Zurich; Foundation La Caixa, Barcelona, Spain; University Art Museum/Pacific Film Archive, Berkeley; and his videos are distributed by Electronic Arts Intermix.

His interactive multimedia projects (Web, DVD, CD-ROM, Laserdisc) include: "World-Wide-Walks", "DOUBLE YOU" (and X,Y,Z.), "TransmissionS", "TRACES", "STRING CYCLES", "VR/RV: a Recreational Vehicle in Virtual Reality", "YOO (YearZEROZERO)", and "@Vesu.Vius." The installations have not been exhibited at the Philadelphia Museum of Art, Long Beach Museum of Art, as part of the Video Viewpoints series at The Museum of Modern Art, the Festival des Arts Electroniques, Rennes, France, the Interactions exhibition at the Rijksmuseum Twenthe in Enschede, the Netherlands, and the European Media Arts Festival, Osnabruck, Germany. "The TransmissionS: In the WELL "installation (1990) and "VR/RV" (1995) both received honorary awards for interactive art at [Prix Ars Electronica, Linz, Austria].

He was an artist-in-residence at the TV Laboratory, WNET, New York, the Banff Centre for the Arts, Canada, the Rockefeller Foundation's Bellagio Center, Italy, the Experimental Television Center as well as a visiting artist at the National Center for SuperComputing Applications, University of Illinois, and the American Academy in Rome.

D’Agostino's books include: World-Wide- Walks: Crossing Natural-Cultural-Virtual Frontiers (2019),Transmission: toward a post-television culture, The Un/Necessary Image and TeleGuide-including a Proposal for QUBE. He is also a contributor to: Art & Electronic Media, Photography and Language, Illuminating Video, and Theories and Documents of Contemporary Art. Publications featuring his work include: "Video Art," "New Media in Art", and "Digital Art" in the Thames & Hudson World of Art series.

== Awards ==
- National Endowment for the Arts Fellowships, 1974, 1977, 1979
- Pew Fellowships in the Arts
- Onassis Foundation Fellowship
- Japan Foundation Fellowship
- Pennsylvania Council on the Arts, Fellowships
- Center for Advanced Visual Studies, MIT Fellow
- Fulbright Fellowships to Brazil, 1996, Australia, 2003, and Italy 2006.
