= Shalom Gorewitz =

American visual artist (born 1949)

- Born: 1949 (age 76–77)
- Known for: video art

Shalom Gorewitz (born 1949) is an American visual artist. Gorewitz was among the first generation of artists who used early video technology as an expressive medium. Since the late 1960s, he has created videos that "transform recorded reality through an expressionistic manipulation of images and sound". His artworks often "confront the political conflicts, personal losses, and spiritual rituals of contemporary life". Gorewitz has also made documentary and narrative films.

Gorewitz’s videos have been exhibited and screened at festivals, galleries and museums worldwide. His work is in the permanent collections of the Whitney Museum, New York; the Museum of Modern Art, New York; Museo Nacional Centro de Arte Reina Sofia, Madrid; Zentrum fur Kunst und Medientechnologie Karlsruhe, Germany; Itau Cultural Center, São Paulo, Brazil; Kowasaki Museum, Tokyo; the Library of the California Institute of the Arts, Valencia; The New York Public Library; and the Getty Museum Video Art Archive, Los Angeles.

Gorewitz was awarded a Guggenheim Fellowship in Video and Audio in 1989 and has received grants from the National Endowment for the Arts, the Asian Cultural Foundation, and Arts America. He has received two Fulbright Senior Specialist fellowships to conduct research and teach at the Kwame Nkrumah University of Science and Technology in Kumasi, Ghana where he is also an adjunct professor in Visual Arts and Animation. Gorewitz was a professor of Video and New Media at Ramapo College of New Jersey from 1982-2022 and was dean of the School of Contemporary Arts at Ramapo from 1991-1998.

== Education ==
Gorewitz graduated from the California Institute of the Arts with a B.F.A. in 1971. He was a student of the pioneering video artist Nam June Paik, and of Alison Knowles, Gene Youngblood, and Allan Kaprow, among others. Gorewitz received an M.F.A. from Antioch International University in 1986.

== Career ==
=== Early years ===
Following graduation, Gorewitz worked as a Video Associate for the dancer and choreographer Daniel Nagrin. Gorewitz collaborated with Nagrin to create the official video recordings of Steps, (1972) and The Edge is Also a Circle, (1973). During these years, while pursuing his own creative projects, Gorewitz was the video art columnist for Changes in the Arts magazine. His contributions included early coverage of Shirley Clarke’s T. P. Videospace Troupe’s traveling video workshop.

=== RASTER ===
In 1978, Gorewitz conceived of and produced RASTER, one of the first programs dedicated to video art on cable television. Shown on New York’s public access cable channel, the weekly program presented the artist’s own abstract videos as well as interviews and collaborations with other artists and actors. Because experimental video was a new visual form, RASTER opened with a message from Gorewitz reassuring viewers that while they might be seeing something “unusual”, what was on the screen would “neither harm them nor their [television set].”

From 1977 to 1981, Gorewitz was a guest curator at The Kitchen in New York City, organizing exhibitions, panels, and screenings highlighting video art as well as "work being done by artists with prototype and often homemade analog and early digital computers". Founded by video artists Steina and Woody Vesulka, The Kitchen became a respected site for exhibitions of video and media art.

=== Experimental Television Center ===
Gorewitz was a resident artist at the Experimental Television Center from 1977 to 1993. In 2015, Gorewitz’s work was included in a retrospective exhibition on the history of the ETC, which was considered "one of North America’s preeminent organizations for video art, fostering a community for creativity and innovation through its residency and tool-building programs" for over forty years.

=== Night Flight ===
Videos by Gorewitz were presented on the USA Network’s television series Night Flight. A re-edit of the artist’s 1982 video US Sweat became the regular "sign-off" for the program.

=== Bronx Museum and Blue Swee ===
From 1983 to 85, Gorewitz was an artist in residence at the Bronx Museum of the Arts. Throughout these years he collected images and audio for his video Blue Swee: Some Thoughts on the US Invasion of Grenada. Working with students and artists in the Bronx, Gorewitz notes,

We often went to the local parks and videotaped break dancing, verbal games, and community events. When the United States invaded the small Island of Grenada, I made a link to the sometimes violent policing I’d seen around the Museum. At the Experimental Television Center...I sequenced several channels of video at a rapid speed to mix scenes of break dancing in the park with well-known archival footage of police violently attacking peaceful protestors. A father and son practicing karate are juxtaposed with marching cadets and Vice President Bush. There are only a few actual conventional edits. All of the cuts are based on a “homemade” prototype sequencer built by David Jones. The soundtrack was composed and performed with Brooks Williams and Beo Morales. It has a techno reggae sound with gunshots as punctuating percussion. I was hearing early examples of hip hop music and wanted the visuals to be like rapid fire visual rap.

=== Select and noteworthy exhibitions ===
Early exhibitions by the artist include Jerusalem Calling (1972), commissioned by New York’s Jewish Museum; the multimedia exhibition featured a multi-channel audio installation by Gorewitz. In 1979, video works by Gorewitz were exhibited at New York City’s White Columns (originally named 112 Workshop), the Hal Bromm Gallery, and in 1983 and ‘86, at the Semaphore Gallery. During the 1970s and 80s, Gorewitz screened his videos in alternative spaces including clubs, bars, and other non-art venues. An early video by Gorewitz was shown on the jumbo screen during halftime of a football game in the Seattle Kingdome as part of the ‘Art in Public Spaces’ series, and Gorewitz’s video Dance This Mess Around was shown at the New York City nightclub Hurrah. Works by the artist were also presented on WNYC’s video art program Videoville (1993).

Gorewitz’s videos were selected for the 1981, 1983, and 1987 editions of the Whitney Biennial. In a review of the 1983 Biennial, New York Times art critic Grace Glueck writes of the artist’s work, "Mr. Gorewitz takes us on a euphoric cross-country romp, in which trees, factories, street signs, railroad tracks, cars and other landscape furnishings are image-processed almost to abstraction, the rhythmic results enhanced by 'live' sounds and a rollicking score." Curator Lois Bianchi included videos by Gorewitz—along with other artists who helped pave the way for video art—in the touring exhibition Video Transformations (1986–87) which was presented at museums across the U.S.

Gorewitz’s work was included in the historic exhibition The First Decade: Video From the E.A.I. Archives (2002) held at the Museum of Modern Art, New York with concurrent presentations at other venues throughout the city. In 2004, the artist’s work was featured in Urban Eden: Three Videos by New York Artists at New York’s Jewish Museum.

=== Documentaries ===
While he was an artist in residence at the Bronx Museum, Gorewitz was commissioned by the Museum to produce a documentary about the celebrated Moroccan painter Mohamed Melehi whose retrospective opened at the Bronx Museum of the Arts in 1984. Gorewitz traveled to Morocco to capture Melehi’s "universe and iconography", creating an artful and informative documentary on the painter’s practice. In 2020, Gorewitz's documentary on Melehi was presented by the Alserkal Arts Foundation Dubai, in New Waves: Mohamed Melehi and the Casablanca Art School Archive.

Gorewitz produced a documentary with Rachel Hadas and Edouard Eloi on the life of the Haitian painter Stivenson Magloire.

In 2019, Gorewitz wrote an essay for the Hopkins Review on the origins and future of video art.

== Personal life ==
Shalom Gorewitz lives and works in New York and Vermont. He is married to the poet Rachel Hadas.

== Notable works ==
Select titles by Shalom Gorewitz distributed by the Electronic Arts Intermix include:

- Travels (1979-1980) 28:05 min, color, sound
- U.S. Sweat (1982) 16:10 min, color, sound
- Dissonant Landscapes (1984–86) 14:39 min, color, sound
- Subatomic Babies (1983) 8:07 min, color, sound
- Promised Land (1990) 7:16 min, color, sound
- Melehi 1984, 25:10 min, color, sound
- A Conversation with Robert Longo (1984) 11:17 min color, sound
