= Adrian Lee Kellard =

American artist

Adrian Lee Kellard (January 28, 1959 – November 14, 1991) was an American artist from New Rochelle, New York known for his woodcuts and sculptures of religious and often homoerotic imagery.

== Education and Work ==
Kellard studied at the State University of New York at Purchase from 1977 to 1980 under the guidance of Uruguayan artists Antonio Frasconi and Judith Bernstein. After leaving SUNY Purchase and relocating to New York City, he apprenticed under Thomas Lanigan-Schmidt through the SUNY Empire State Program. Kellard was represented first by Schreiber/Cutler Gallery in SoHo, which became the Susan Schreiber Gallery in 1989, and exhibited in six solo shows more than 25 group exhibitions from 1980 until his death in 1991.

Best known for his woodcuts, his earliest works were prints, but Kellard swiftly chose to make the carved and painted wood blocks finished artwork rather than the prints they could create. Kellard was influenced by an eclectic group of artists including Marsden Hartley, Picasso and Van Gogh. His work often combined religious imagery, "low" art and homosexual iconography.

Kellard often integrated religion into daily life by creating functional art, such as desks, calendars and screens.

Subsequent to Kellard's diagnosis of AIDS in 1987, his work became less overtly religious and angry, and instead he began to use subdued colors and the tone became melancholy and compassionate as seen in The Promise (below right).

== Death ==
On November 14, 1991, Kellard died, aged 32, of complications due to AIDS. At the time, he was considered a long time survivor, having lived with the disease for five years. Since his death his work continues to be shown in such exhibitions as "All Faiths Beautiful" and "Race, Class, Gender ≠ Character" at the American Visionary Art Museum in Baltimore Maryland, "Precious" and "From Media to Metaphor" at the Grey Art Gallery and Study Center at New York University. Kellard is represented in the collections of the American Visionary Art Museum in Baltimore, Maryland, the Museum of Contemporary Religious Art (MOCRA) at Saint Louis University, St. Louis, Missouri, Prudential Insurance Company in Newark, New Jersey, the New Jersey State Museum in Trenton, New Jersey, the Grey Art Gallery at New York University in New York City and the Neuberger Museum of Art in Purchase, New York.

== Reviews ==
- Baran, Jessica, "Adrian Kellard: The Learned Art of Compassion," Art Papers, January 2012.
- Baran, Jessica, "Adrian Kellard: The Learned Art of Compassion," The Riverfront Times, November 2011
- Glueck, Grace, "Religion Makes an Impact as a Theme in Today's Art," The New York Times, April 1985
