= Rachel Hadas =

American poet, teacher, essayist, and translator

Rachel Hadas (born November 8, 1948) is an American poet, teacher, essayist, and translator. Her most recent essay collection is Piece by Piece: Selected Prose (Paul Dry Books, 2021), and her most recent poetry collection is Ghost Guest (Ragged Sky Press, 2023). Her honors include a Guggenheim Fellowship, Ingram Merrill Foundation Grants, the O.B. Hardison Award from the Folger Shakespeare Library, and an Award in Literature from the American Academy and Institute of Arts and Letters.

== Biography ==
The daughter of noted Columbia University classicist Moses Hadas and Latin teacher Elizabeth Chamberlayne Hadas, Hadas grew up in Morningside Heights, New York City. She received a baccalaureate at Radcliffe College in classics, a Master of Arts (1977) at Johns Hopkins University in poetry, and a doctorate at Princeton University in comparative literature (1982).

Living in Greece after her undergraduate work at Radcliffe, Hadas became an intimate of poet James Merrill, a strong influence on her early work. Her subject matter combines her roots in the classics with the intimately personal, with memory and elegy recurring themes throughout her work. Her late husband George Edwards’s illness with early-onset dementia gave rise not only to her 2011 memoir Strange Relation but also to an involvement in the field of medical humanities. During the height of the AIDS crisis, she led poetry workshops for those afflicted, and edited an anthology of poems produced there, Unending Dialogue: Poems from an AIDS Poetry Workshop (1993).

Hadas is also a translator, specializing in Classical Greek and Latin, and has translated the works of Euripides and Nonnus. Her translations of writers including Tibullus, Charles Baudelaire, and the Greek poet Konstantinos Karyotakis, were collected in Other Worlds Than This (1994). Hadas currently serves as Original English Verse Editor of the journal Classical Outlook.

Hadas taught English at the Newark campus of Rutgers University from 1981 to 2023; in 2001 she was named Board of Governors Professor of English. Hadas lives in New York City and Danville Vermont and is married to the visual artist Shalom Gorewitz, with whom she collaborates on poetry and video. She was married to composer George Edwards until his death in 2011. Hadas has a son, Jonathan Hadas Edwards (born 1984), an acupuncturist, herbalist, and writer.

== Bibliography ==
=== Poetry and prose ===
Collections

- Ghost Guest, Ragged Sky Press, 2023, ISBN 978-1-933974-52-1
- Pandemic Almanac, Ragged Sky Press, 2022, ISBN 978-1933974453
- Love and Dread, Measure Press, 2021, ISBN 978-1939574329
- Piece by Piece, Paul Dry Books, 2021, ISBN 9781589881556
- Poems for Camilla, Measure Press, 2018, ISBN 1939574250
- Questions in the Vestibule: Poems, Northwestern University Press, 2016, ISBN 978-0-8101-3317-4
- The golden road: poems. Evanston, Ill.: TriQuarterly Books/Northwestern University Press. 2012. ISBN 9780810128590.
- Strange Relation, Paul Dry Books, 2011, ISBN 978-1-58988-061-0
- The Ache of Appetite, Copper Beech Press, 2010, ISBN 978-0-914278-84-9
- River of Forgetfulness, David Robert Books, 2006, ISBN 978-1-933456-24-9; (WordTech Communications, 2006)
- Laws, University of Nebraska Press, 2004), ISBN 978-1-932023-13-8
- Merrill, Cavafy, poems, and dreams. Ann Arbor: The University of Michigan Press. 2000.
- Indelible. Wesleyan University Press. 2001. ISBN 978-0-8195-6440-5.
- Halfway Down the Hall. (Wesleyan University Press. 1998. ISBN 978-0-8195-2251-1.
- The Double Legacy: Reflections on a Pair of Deaths (Faber & Faber, 1995)
- The Empty Bed. Wesleyan University Press. 1995. ISBN 978-0-8195-1225-3.
- Mirrors of Astonishment (Rutgers University Press, 1992)
- Living in Time (Rutgers University Press, 1990)
- Pass It On, Princeton University Press, 1989, ISBN 978-0-691-01454-8
- A Son from Sleep. Wesleyan University Press. 1987. ISBN 978-0-8195-1140-9.
- Slow Transparency (Wesleyan University Press, 1983)

Chapbooks

- Starting from Troy (David R. Godine, 1975)
- "Two Poems" (Dim Gray Bar Press, 2000)

=== Translations ===
- Tales of Dionysus, University of Michigan Press, 2022 ISBN 9780472038961
- The Iphigenia Plays of Euripides, Northwestern University Press 2018, ISBN 9780810137233
- Other Worlds Than This, Rutgers University Press, 1994

=== Anthologies edited ===
- The Waiting Room Reader II, CavanKerry Press, 2013, ISBN 978-1-933880-34-1
- The Greek Poets: Homer to the Present (W.W. Norton, 2010; Eds., Peter Constantine, Rachel Hadas, Edmund Keeley, Karen Van Dyck)
- Unending Dialogue: Voices from an AIDS Poetry Workshop (Ed. with Charles Barber, Faber & Faber, 1991)

=== Essay collections ===
- Classics: Essays (Textos Books, 2007)
- Merrill, Cavafy, Poems, and Dreams (University of Michigan Press, 2000)
- Form, Cycle, Infinity: Landscape Imagery in the Poetry of Robert Frost & George Seferis. Bucknell University Press. 1985. ISBN 978-0-8387-5073-5.

=== Memoirs ===
- Strange Relation: A Memoir of Marriage, Dementia, and Poetry. Paul Dry Books. 2011. ISBN 978-1-58988-061-0.

== Sources ==
- Library of Congress Online Catalog > Rachel Hadas
