= Antonio Frasconi =

Uruguayan-American visual artist

- Born: 28 April 1919; Montevideo, Uruguay
- Died: 8 January 2013 (aged 93); Norwalk, Connecticut, US
- Occupations: Artist, educator
- Known for: Woodcuts
- Spouse: Leona Pierce
- Children: Pablo Frasconi, Miguel Frasconi
- Awards: Premio Figari

Antonio Frasconi (28 April 1919 in Montevideo, Uruguay – 8 January 2013 in Norwalk, CT, USA) was a Uruguayan - American visual artist, best known for his woodcuts. He was raised in Montevideo, Uruguay, and lived in the United States from 1945.

== Life ==
Antonio Rudolfo Frasconi was born 28 April 1919 on a boat between Argentina & Uruguay and was raised in Montevideo, Uruguay. He had parents of Italian descent. They had moved to South America during World War I. Frasconi's mother managed a restaurant whilst his father was frequently unemployed. Frasconi frequently quotes his mother and her view of his talents. He said that his mother talked of art at the church where she was brought up as if it had been done by God rather than man. She felt that if Frasconi had been born with a gift, he would already be a famous artist rather than working like her each day. His mother worked in the restaurant, cared for Frasconi and his two sisters and still found time to be a seamstress

By the age of twelve, he was learning a trade at a printers after abandoning a course at Círculo de Bellas Artes. During his teenage years he admired Gustave Doré and Goya, whilst indulging in creating caricatures of political figures.

During the war, an exhibition of impressionism and post-impression was organised by the French in Latin America. Artists such as Van Gogh and Cézanne captured his imagination. However it was the woodcuts of Paul Gauguin that he was attracted to most. Frasconi says he became intrigued by American writers and musicians. He would hear Jazz on the radio and read American authors like Walt Whitman.

Frasconi moved to the United States in 1945 at the end of World War II. He worked as a gardener and as a guard at the Santa Barbara Museum of Art. It was at that museum that he had his first dedicated show. His recognition was beginning to grow and within twelve months he had a similar show at the Brooklyn Museum of Art.

Frasconi was a Guggenheim Fellow in 1952.

In 1955, Frasconi's woodcuts were exhibited at the Summit Art Association, now known as Visual Arts Center of New Jersey, in Summit, NJ. This show was an extensive traveling exhibition organized by the Smithsonian Institution.

In 1959 he was a runner-up for the Caldecott Medal from the U.S. children's librarians, which annually honors the illustrator of the best American picture book for children. Thus The House That Jack Built, which he also wrote, is retrospectively termed a Caldecott Honor Book.

In 1962 Frasconi won a Horn Book Fanfare award for The Snow and the Sun - La Nieve y el Sol a book he had created in two languages. He has frequently produced multilingual books. Also in 1962, he was elected into the National Academy of Design as an Associate member, and became a full Academician in 1969.

In 1982 Frasconi was the Distinguished Teaching Professor of Visual Arts at the State University of New York at Purchase.

Frasconi's students have included Martha Zelt, Adrian Lee Kellard, Tanya Kukucka and Ron Rocco.

Between 1981 and 1986 he created a series of woodcuts under the name "Los desaparecidos" (The Disappeared). This series refers directly to the people who were tortured and killed during the Civic-military dictatorship of Uruguay.

Antonio Frasconi died on 8 January 2013.

== Selected works ==
- 12 Fables of Aesop, text by Glenway Wescott (Museum of Modern Art, 1954)
- See and say = Guarda e parla = Regarda et parle = Mira y habla (1955) — in English, Italian, French, and Spanish
- Frasconi Woodcuts (1958)
- The House that Jack Built: La Maison Que Jacques A Batie (1958) — in English and French
- A Whitman Portrait (1960)
- The Snow and the Sun: a South American folk rhyme in two languages = La Nieve y el Sol (1962) — in English and Spanish
- A Sunday in Monterey: Woodcuts (1964)
- The Cantilever Rainbow (A), text by Ruth Krauss (1965)
- A Kaleidoscope in Woodcuts (1968)
- On the Slain Collegians, a selection from the poems of Herman Melville. Edited and with woodcuts, by Antonio Frasconi (1971)
- Frasconi: Against the Grain, the woodcuts of Antonio Frasconi (1974)
- The Disappeared, Collection of woodcuts now at the MNAV Museum Natl. Visual Arts in Montevideo, Uruguay donated by the author, curated by Eduardo Darino. There is also a film with the artwork, video and animation Eduardo Darino, introductory text by Mario Benedetti music Pablo Frasconi.
