= Ron Rocco =

American artist (born 1953)

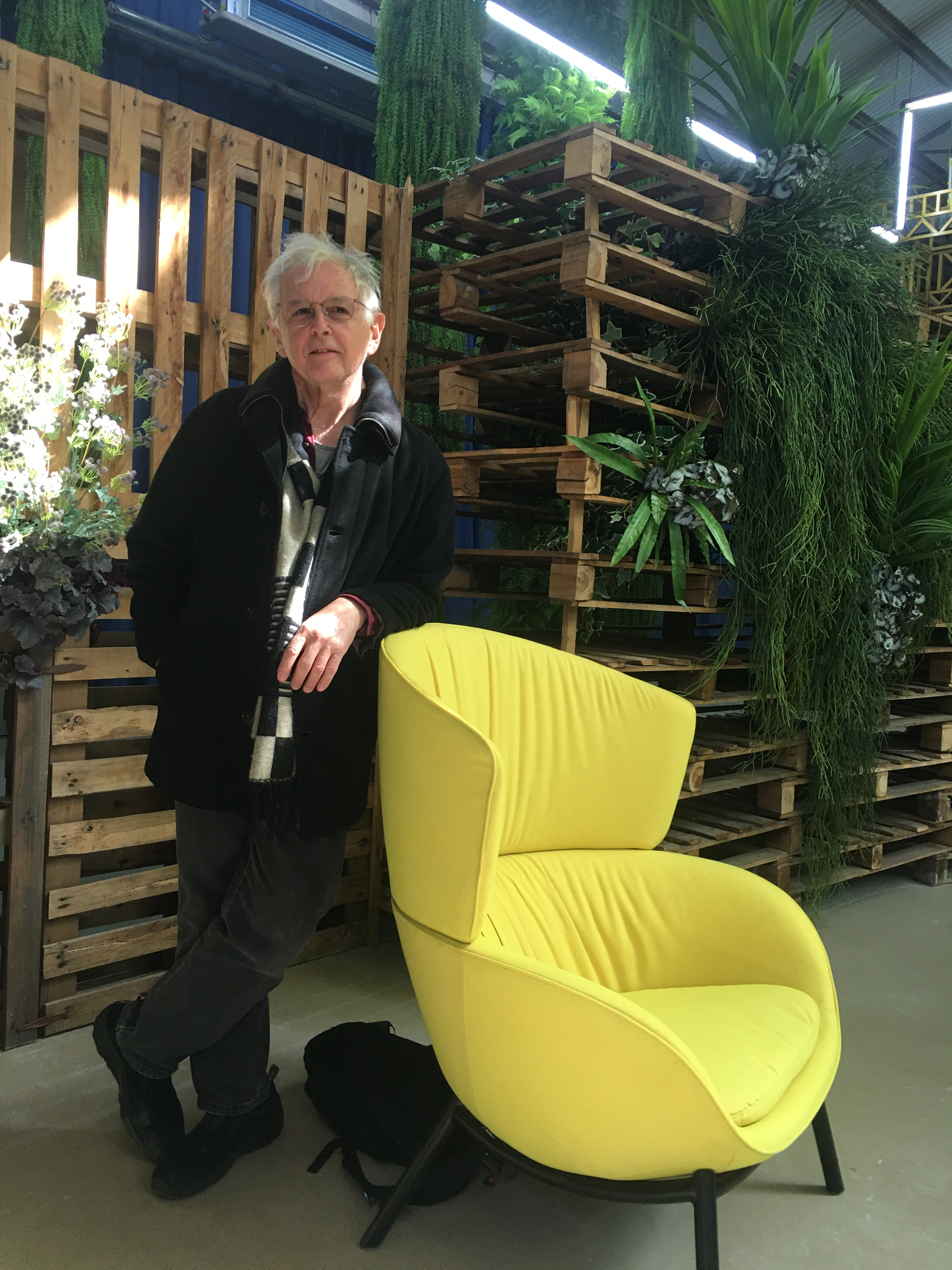
- Rocco in 2019
- Born: 1953 (age 72–73); Texas, U.S.
- Known for: Installation art, photography, printmaking, sculpture, performance art, video art
- Awards: Art Matters Foundation, Creative and Performing Arts Council of Cornell University, Foundation for Contemporary Arts, NEA, Netherland-America Foundation, NYFA, NYSCA, among others.
- Website: ronrocco.com

Ron Rocco (born 1953, Texas, U.S) is an American artist who has worked in New York City, Rotterdam in the Netherlands, Berlin, Germany and China. His work entails performance, mixed media installations and sculptural constructions employing a mix of found objects and prepared elements.

== Early life and education ==
As a child, Rocco traveled with his parents to Germany, where his father served as an American soldier in the post-war occupation army. The artist attributed his early experience with German culture as a defining element in the background to his interest in Europe and his sometimes social and political themes.

In the late 1950s and '60s Rocco grew up in the Bronx in New York City. His was an ethnically Italian neighborhood, surrounding Arthur Avenue, known as the Little Italy of the Bronx. The neighborhood scrap metal yards inspired an early interest in working with metals and a sense of the latent potential of found materials to evoke memory and associations. Rocco went on to study the visual arts at Purchase College, State University of New York, with classmates Jon Kessler and Fred Wilson, studying with sculptor Tal Streeter, photographer and musician John Cohen and printmaker Antonio Frasconi. Later he began graduate study at the Center for Advanced Visual Studies at M.I.T. under the instruction of the German Group Zero artist Otto Piene, filmmaker Ricky Leacock, and anthropologist Heather Lechtman. Here Rocco began projects which would result in his Guggenheim, New York performance entitled Zaroff's Tale.

== Early career ==
Rocco's earliest work in sculpture grew out of an interest in the tension generated forms, made famous by the American artist Kenneth Snelson and German architect Frei Otto. Rocco's work was based on arced segments of aluminum or wood, in constructions which displayed a balance between tensile and compression forces, subject to the effects of gravity.

His exploration of these structures appeared in the exhibition Models for Large Sculpture, presented at the Arnot Art Museum in Elmira, New York and later in a solo exhibition at Toronto's Galerie Danielli.

While residing in Ithaca, New York, Rocco's work through a public commission from Festival Ithaca and the National Endowment for the Arts in 1977 resulted in Altair, a matrix of arc segments and stainless steel cable, occupying an area of 1,200 cubic feet (34 m^{3}), suspended five stories above the city center. Meketra, a second large-scale commission from this period, was exhibited at Cornell University's Herbert F. Johnson Museum of Art.

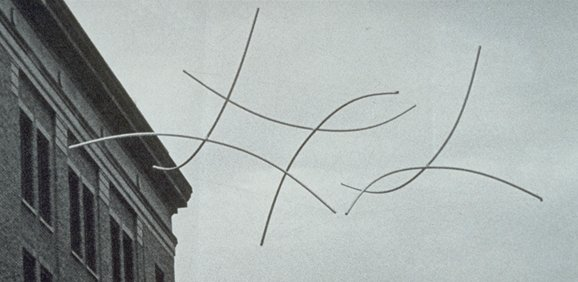
Altair installation by Ron Rocco, 1977 Plastic tubing, aluminum, stainless steel cable.

In the period of 1979-80, Rocco returned to New York City and met and was influenced by the work of German artist Joseph Beuys, who was producing his solo exhibition at the Guggenheim Museum at the time. As a result of this new influence later work in tension sculptures began to encompass performance activities, employed string figures taken from Inuit and Oceanic sources; forms, which in their traditional context possessed a social facet, in the communication of communal beliefs and ritual.

Rocco used these as mechanisms for presentation to his audience in performance works like Zaroff's Tale (Guggenheim Museum, New York), A String form for Binding Nations (United Nations, New York) and Laser Sculpture Dance (Herbert F. Johnson Museum of Art in Ithaca, New York).

== Work in performance and electronic media ==
Building on earlier work at M.I.T.'s Visual Language Workshop and Owego, New York's Experimental Television Center, Rocco authored computer software to produce an early image-processing system for video. His works "Plotzensee" (2000) and "Berlin Diaries" (2000) can be found in the Experimental Television Center Repository, in the Rose Goldsen Archive of New Media Art. This resulted in his 1985 collaboration with dance choreographer Mel Wong and The Mel Wong Dance Company. Together they presented Buddha Meets Einstein at the Great Wall during an American tour and at New York's Asia Society.

This presentation used dance in combination with pre-recorded and real-time computer/video image processing to explore varying perceptions of time from both an American and Asian viewpoint. It was a performance that New York Times dance critic Jennifer Dunning called one of the most successful integrations of video imagery and modern dance.

At the time, Rocco clarified, "The formal concerns of movement in dance could accentuate the effects of my equipment on the flow of time, providing a suitable format for the beauty and complexity of this subtle video processor". This performance was funded by a 1984 Inter-Arts Grant from The National Endowment for the Arts and the Sony Corporation, and may have been the first live, on-stage application of computer-generated imagery for dance.

Other media projects in-residence at Canada's Banff Center in Alberta involved musician David Hykes, of The Harmonic Choir. Together they developed a computer-assisted laser/video work, which generated kinetic cycles of visual phenomena from Hykes's music. One such installation provided real-time, graphic representation of sound, employing a laser scanner and a digitally processed video feedback loop to create images that were abstract and strikingly calligraphic. This appeared in the work In Light of Sound, one of Rocco's Andro-Media Series installations, at the Cathedral of St. John the Divine in New York City. The New York State Council on the Arts funded event in collaboration Hykes, and his Harmonic Choir used the two-thousand-year-old tradition of Mongolian overtone chanting, practiced by these musicians, to control the visual phenomena created by the system of scanning lasers, video displays and computer processor.

In the later 1990s, Rocco explored the potential of web-based projects in works like Rabinal Achi/Zapatista Port Action of 1997, a collaboration with Ricardo Dominguez, for the M.I.T./List Center Gallery's exhibition PORT/Navigating Digital Culture, and Communicating Vessels with Dutch artist Arnold Schalks.

Rabinal Achi/Zapatista Port Action was a fusion of drama and social commentary into a work spanning eight hundred years of Mayan history. Eight broadcast events were produced (via Pseudo Media in New York), bringing together news clips, interviews and discussion groups from Chiapas, Mexico, and the U.S. along with Mayan theater, for the List Gallery exhibition and the Internet. Rabinal Achi/Zapatista Port Action was a composite work, and used a VRML bridge to join live audio and video streams, chat groups and an enactment of the Rabinal-Achi, a classic Mayan theater work of highland Guatemala.

Communicating Vessels was presented as a maritime contribution to the Snug Harbor Cultural Center's program in 1998. This site-specific and web-based project, located at the St. George terminal of the Staten Island Ferry, joined maritime subjects, navigation technology and historical documents to explore the relationship of Snug Harbor Cultural Center's past, as a home for retired seamen, to the present refuge for aged sailors in Sea Level, North Carolina. Through interviews with the residents of the North Carolina facility, Communicating Vessels presented the Atlantic Ocean as the connective element between the two locations via the Internet, using an information kiosk at the St. George site to present the web site, track ferry navigation via software provided by MapTech corporation, and to distribute newspapers and other publications. Communicating Vessels was funded by the Netherlands Consul to North America and CBK Centrum Bildende Kunst, Rotterdam.

== Sculpture and European projects ==
Resident in New York 1979–1989 on the Lower East Side and later in Williamsburg, Brooklyn, Rocco's sculptural work focused on New York real estate as a defining force in the life experiences of artists.

A Poet Dies on 12th Street, 1982 Posted mail, vinyl, wood, audio electronics and fluorescent light.

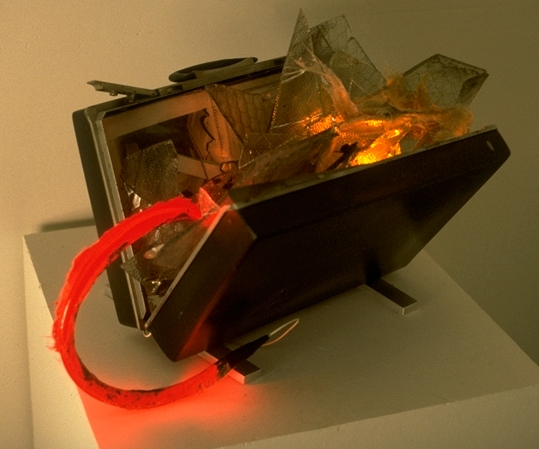
Eviction Plan, 1990 Valise, glass, legal paperwork, red neon and rubber stamp.

Works like A Poet Dies on 12th Street and Eviction Plan stem from his experiences as a tenant organizer at this time, and document cases of murder and arson as side products of these economic forces.

Focusing on the balance between the natural and manmade world, Rocco's 1989 Waterline Project in Amsterdam, Netherlands was created for the Dutch foundation ArtGarden.

The project consisted of three outdoor sculptures in a park-like environment, and commented on the Dutch accomplishment of redefining natural boundaries between earth and sea. The project was produced with the joint support of The Netherlands-America Foundation, Art Matters, The New York Foundation for the Arts and The Foundation for Contemporary Performance Arts, Martin Air Holland, Regency Art Transfer of New York and the generous assistance of the Dutch Consulate to the United States and The Department of Cultural Affairs of the City of New York.

The Horizon is Nothing More than the Limit of Our Sight, Rocco's 1990 installation for the Brooklyn Museum of Art in New York, in addressing the natural and man-made worlds used the horizon to define a perceptual boundary.

This installation implied the possibility of a new social awareness, by people sharing interests of greater ecological benefit. Confronting a video landscape, and traversing the maze of barriers which comprise this work, the spectator explores the conceptual limits, which isolate us from this awareness.

Other projects during Rocco's later European residencies at Künstlerhaus Bethanien and Die KünstFabrik in Berlin, Germany as well as Kunst & Complex in Rotterdam, Netherlands, resulted in exhibitions in 1991–93. The Berlin Project, fruit of his work at Künstlerhaus Bethanien's International Studio Program, was a body of art works which identified distinct facets of Berlin's evolving social dynamic. The showcased objects referenced the socialist realism found in eastern parts of the city, as well as commercial elements taken from the west. The project, part of which is housed in Berlin's Berlinische Galerie, utilized images taken from the streets and transit system of the city, as well as historical references, to reveal the new rules in an economic struggle beginning in the city at that time.

Private Parts, the product of his residency at Kunst & Complex in 1993, focused on self-examination, an examination defined as transcending the individual. This body of work, which delineated personal issues such as age, masculinity, and health, took on more global meaning, in the context of addressing questions of human frailty, genocide and social values during times of transition. In this body of work, Rocco often refers to elements of control and order, and environments bordering on social cataclysm, through images of sinking ships, deserted streets and disoriented swimmers.

He identified this work, "functioning as a diary of thoughts and images, from a year of painful transformation in Europe, posting warnings of all that is at stake in the search for peace and unification in Europe".

== Amerika ==
Perhaps because of long periods in residence outside the United States, or due to his earlier experiences in opposition to the Vietnam War, Rocco began to articulate a new view of American culture.

Structures of Detention, an edition of photo-silk-screen prints on bound editions of the New York Law Journal, document a social dynamic between crime and punishment. Houses of detention and federal buildings in New York City provide the counterpoint to court proceedings and records outlined within each page's text. These artworks establish a dialog between the pages and these buildings, which provides an opportunity for social commentary and dark humor.

Other works like The Pursuit Series, drawings made from television images of police activity, and 30 Minutes, black-and-white photographs in an enlarged contact sheet format, focus on an American fascination with representations of criminal behavior, policing, and criminal justice.

Post-9/11 as the U.S. began its ventures into war in Iraq and Afghanistan, Rocco's work became more critical of the escalating violence. Works like StarBlind and Bloody State confronted the blind march to war and its aftermath. An installation work from the end of the decade, Bail Out, questioned the accounting that resulted in the rescue of Wall Street in a humorous work, which included an overturned accountant's ledger, the spilled cyphers, and a golden lined parachute with its requisite air blower.

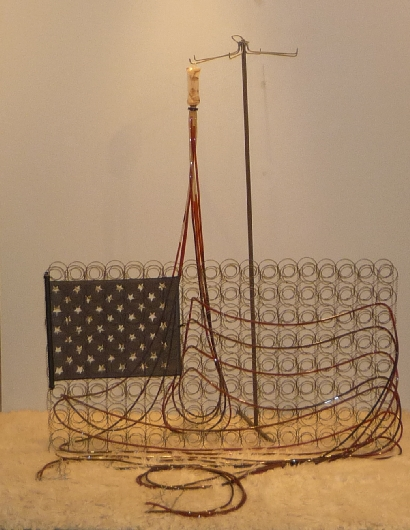
Bloody State as installed at Scope Basel for CTS Gallery. Basel, Switzerland

The installation Shake Up! from his 2010 New York exhibition at Dam Stuhltrager Gallery, curated by Lynn del Sol, is an artwork addressing issues of environmental degradation and the reality of global warming. It records the moment of shock, the rude awakening after a turning point. Shake Up! is the moment after the earth moves and we find ourselves in a hostile new environment. It also symbolizes the hoped-for heed of the 'wake up call' to humanity.

Shake Up! 2010 Photo-etched aluminum, video projection, micro-crystalline wax and vinyl fabric with ink.

== China ==
In 2011, Rocco visited China for the first time. He explains the circumstances of his visit in this way:

In the 80's I worked extensively with dancer, choreographer Mel Wong and his dance company. During that time Mel invited me to visit him in Hong Kong, while he was an artist in residence in that city. Although fascinated by the prospect of visiting Hong Kong, at that time the visit was not possible. From that point on a deep regret at missing this opportunity began to develop. I promised myself I would not miss the next opportunity when one developed.

In 2011, such an invitation was offered and in keeping with my promise I came to Hong Kong. During that visit, on the suggestion of a friend, I took a ferry to Zhuhai, China. It is no exaggeration to say my interest in relocating to Zhuhai was like love at first sight.

Once in China new possibilities appeared. Rocco completed a master's study in Spatial Design at the University of St. Joseph in Macau, and in his thesis he discusses the developments of this period. Key to this was an interest in teaching. Rocco says he reflected on the words of Joseph Beuys when Beuys said, "Teaching is my greatest work of art…the rest is the waste product, a demonstration. If you want to express yourself you must present something tangible. But after a while this has only the function of a historic document. Objects aren't very important any more. I want to get to the origin of matter, to the thought behind it." (Artforum magazine interview with Willoughby Sharp in 1969.) "Beuys saw the role of an artist as a teacher or shaman who could guide society in a new direction." (Sotheby's catalog, 1992.)

To Rocco, it was clear Beuys chose the classroom as his canvas in orchestrating an open forum for intellectual exchange and frequently applied "philosophical concepts to his pedagogical practice." (Beuys.) Rocco began teaching in China, combining art concepts with other interests in guiding his students to further their future success. In 2014, Rocco met and began working with a local architect, Josh Wu, consulting on several projects Wu was engaged in. Since then, they have together completed several architectural projects in Zhuhai, which include the interior design of the G Flowers store in the city's Gongbei district, an exterior and interior redevelopment of a building for the Contemporary Music Institute in Beishan, and most notably the redesign of a 400-year-old ancestral hall in the same Beishan village for the Chengchuan Art Gallery.

== Selected solo exhibitions ==
- CTS creative thriftshop /Dam Stuhltrager Gallery, Brooklyn, New York (2010)
- Hudson Guild, New York, New York (2004)
- Galerie Völcker & Freunde, Berlin, Germany (2002)
- University Gallery /University of Massachusetts, Lowell, Massachusetts (1999)
- Warehouse Galerie, Amsterdam, Netherlands (1993)
- Künstlerhaus Bethanien, Berlin, Germany (1991)
- Amerika Haus, Berlin, Germany (1991)
- Foundation Artgarden, Amsterdam, Netherlands (1989)
- Museum of Modern Art /P.S.1, Long Island City, New York (1987)
- Solomon R. Guggenheim Museum, New York, New York (1983)
- Gallery Danielli, Toronto, Ontario, Canada (1979)
- Herbert F. Johnson Museum, Ithaca, New York (1979)
- Arnot Art Museum, Elmira, New York (1976)

== Selected group exhibitions ==
- 2008 IPCNY /International Print Center, New York, ArtForum 2008 Berlin, Germany
- 2007 Supermarkt 2.0, Berlin, Germany,
- 2006 Visual Arts Center of New Jersey, Summit, New Jersey, Künst & Complex, Rotterdam, Netherlands, Stone Quarry Hill Art Park, Cazanovia, New York
- 2004 Scope /New York Galerie Völcker & Freunde, New York, New York, Scope /Miami Galerie Völcker & Freunde, Miami, Florida, Rockland Center for the Arts, Nyack, New York
- 2001 Collaborative Concepts, Beacon, New York, Hudson Guild, New York, New York
- 2000 Islip Art Museum/Anthony Giordano Gallery, Islip, New York, Galerie Völcker & Freunde, Berlin, Germany
- 1999 Campo & Campo, Antwerp, Belgium, Galerie Völcker & Freunde, Berlin, Germany
- 1998 Snug Harbor Cultural Center, Staten Island, New York
- 1997 Brooklyn Museum of Art, Brooklyn, New York, Herbert and Vera List Center at M.I.T. Cambridge, MA.
- 1996 Rotunda Gallery, Brooklyn, New York, Neuberger Museum of Art, Purchase, New York, Sylvia White Gallery, New York, New York
- 1995 ISEA95, Montreal, Quebec, Canada
- 1992 Galerie Schoen+Nalepa, Berlin, Germany
- 1991 Fundaçao Demócrito Rocha, Fortalesca, Brazil
- 1990 Katonah Museum of Art, Katonah, New York, Brooklyn Museum of Art, Brooklyn, New York
- 1989 University Art Gallery, SUNY at Albany, New York
- 1987 Brooklyn Art and Cultural Assoc., Brooklyn, New York, Morris Museum, Morristown, New Jersey, P.S.1 -MOMA/Institute for Art and Urban Resources, New York, New York, Banff Center, Alberta, Canada
- 1986 CAD/CAM International Exhibition of Computer Artforms, Kortijk, Belgium, Cathedral of St. John the Divine, New York, New York
- 1985 Asia Society, New York, New York, Video Image Invitational, Foundation Georgio Ronchi, Capri, Italy, Bronx Museum of Art, Bronx, New York
- 1983 United Nations, New York, New York
- 1981 Pratt Institute, Brooklyn, New York, Herbert F. Johnson Museum, Ithaca, New York
- 1980 Gallery Danielli, Toronto, Ontario, Canada
- 1979 The Showing Room, New York, New York, IV Biennale Internazionale Dantesca, Ravenna, Italy
- 1978 Middendorf /Lane Gallery, Washington, D.C., Herbert F. Johnson Museum of Art, Ithaca, New York
- 1975 Roy R. Neuberger Museum, Purchase, New York

== Awards and sponsorship ==
- Kur-World Cup | Environmental Award for Architecture & Design
- Art Matters Foundation
- CBK Centrum Bildende Künst-Rotterdam
- The Creative and Performing Arts Council of Cornell University
- Foundation for Contemporary Performance Arts
- The Netherlands Consul for North America
- The Netherland-America Foundation
- The National Endowment for the Arts / Interdisciplinary Arts Program
- New York Foundation for the Arts /Awards in Sculpture and Printmaking
- New York State Council on the Arts /Individual Artist Program and Sponsored Projects
- Sculpture Award of the Ithaca Art Association

== References (on-line) ==
- Leonardo Magazine: The Horizon is Nothing More than the Limit of Our Sight, and The Berlin Diary.
- Luminous Bodies exhibition curated by Dara Meyers Kingsley.
- Luminous Bodies 1996 Dara Meyers-Kingsley, guest curator
- Cotter, Holland (October 4, 1996). "Art in Review". The New York Times.
- Johnson, Ken (August 28, 1998). "Ahab's Wife, Ignored in 'Moby-Dick,' Tries Again". The New York Times.
- UCSC /Mel Wong Choreography commissions Buddha Meets Einstein at the Great Wall
- New York Times, Dance Review;: 'Laser Sculpture' by Jennifer Dunning Published: May 26, 1981, Tuesday
- MIT Press, Digital Zapatistas by Jill Lane; Summer 2003, Vol. 47, No. 2 (T178), Pages 129-144. Posted Online March 13, 2006. © 2003 New York University and the Massachusetts Institute of Technology
- Lombardi, D. Dominick (April 22, 2001). "Inaugural Exhibition For Gallery in Beacon". The New York Times.
- Artnews.org: Ron Rocco
- "Hudson Guild, New York, New York". Art in America. 90 (8). Archived from the original on October 12, 2008 – via FindArticles.
- Rockland Center for the Art /Digital and Beyond
- Solomon R. Guggenheim Museum Archives Collections: Department of Public Affairs press releases, 1952-2012
- Video History Project /Experimental Television Center
- Solomon R. Guggenheim Museum, New York, New York Museum Library and Archives Catalog
- Dunning, Jennifer (April 1, 1985). "Dance Review: Work by Mel Wong". The New York Times.
- Ecological Art: Ron Rocco
- Stone Quarry Hill Art Park: Ron Rocco
- Intelligent Agent April/May 1997 Intellectual Properties by Robbin Murphy

== References (off-line) ==
- Zhuhai Magazine, May 2017 issue 367, "Space" a review of the Chengchuan Art Gallery.
- Among the Trees, Visual Arts Center of New Jersey exhibition catalog, Summit, New Jersey April 2006.
- The New York Times Arts & New Jersey Footlights March 26, 2006 Among the Trees
- Sunday Star Ledger March 26, 2006 Among the Trees
- Inaugural Invitational, Collaborative Concepts exhibition catalog, Beacon, New York. May 2001.
- Twenty-Six American Artists, Campo & Campo exhibition catalog, September 1999
- New York Times Arts & Entertainment April 22, 2001 Inaugural Invitational at Collaborative Concepts, Beacon, New York
- Luminous Bodies, The Rotunda Gallery exhibition catalog, September 1996.
- Warehouse Galerie, Amsterdam, Netherlands Ron Rocco Private Parts - Rotterdam 1993
- Leonardo Magazine, Vol.26 #4 1993 New Horizons: Notes on a Video Installation
- Fundaçao Demócrito Rocha, Fortalesca, Brazil 1991. Exposiçao Internacional de Escúlturas Efêmeras
- Kunstlerhaus Bethanien, Berlin, Germany. Ron Rocco The Berlin Project 1991
- Plus, Minus, Zero Brussel, Belgium Dec. 1991 Le Projet Berlin
- Berliner Morgenpost, Dec.17, 1991 Kunst-Splitter: Amerika Haus
- Brandenburg Kurier, Dec.13, 1991 Neue Ausstellung: Ron Rocco / The Berlin Project
- The New York Times, Friday, Dec.28, 1990 Exhibition in Katonah: The Machine as Muse
- The Danbury New Times, Vol.8/Issue 46 Nov.17, 1990 Art and Technology
- The Katonah Museum of Art, Katonah, New York 1990 The Technological Muse
- Working in Brooklyn / Installations, The Brooklyn Museum exhibition catalog, Brooklyn, New York October 1990
- The Phoenix, Brooklyn, New York August 9, 1990 Art Made in Brooklyn
- New York Newsday, Tuesday, Aug.7, 1990 Installations with Twists of their Own
- Greenline, Brooklyn, New York May 1990 "Celebration" - Artists Exhibit in Local Lofts
- The Netherland-America Foundation, New York, New York Annual Report 1989
- Newark Star Ledger, April 26, 1987, Art: Morris Exhibit Interfaces Art and Modern Science
- The Arizona Republic, Dimitri Drobatschewsky Nov.22, 1986 East meets West
- Beaux Arts Magazine, No.26 Juil/Aout 1985 Video a Capri
- The New York Times, Monday April 4, 1985 Art from All Corners: Buddha Meets Einstein
- The Guggenheim Museum, New York, New York Annual Report 1983
- The New York Times, Tuesday, Sept.6, 1983 Suspense Story
- The New York Times, May 26, 1981, Ron Rocco/Laser Sculpture Dance
- High Performance Magazine, Issue 17-18/Vol.5 #1 Summer 1982 Ron Rocco/Laser Sculpture Dance 1981
- Edizioni del Centro Dantesco, Ravenna, Italy Ottobre 1979 L'Inferno di Dante e dell 'Uomo Moderno
- The Times Gazette, Ithaca, New York March 11, 1978. Inside Art: New Ithaca Gallery Shows Two Sculptors
- The Times Gazette, Ithaca, New York April 14, 1977. Art Ron Rocco: Physically Sound
