= Alice Righter Edmiston =

American painter

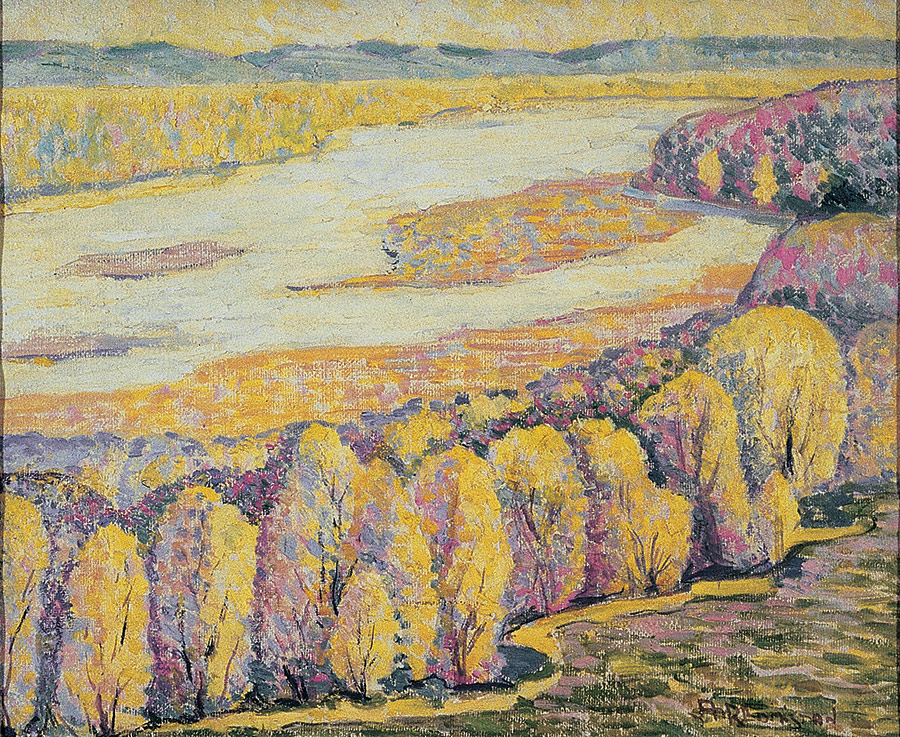
The Platte River At Ashland by Alice Righter Edmiston, oil on canvas.

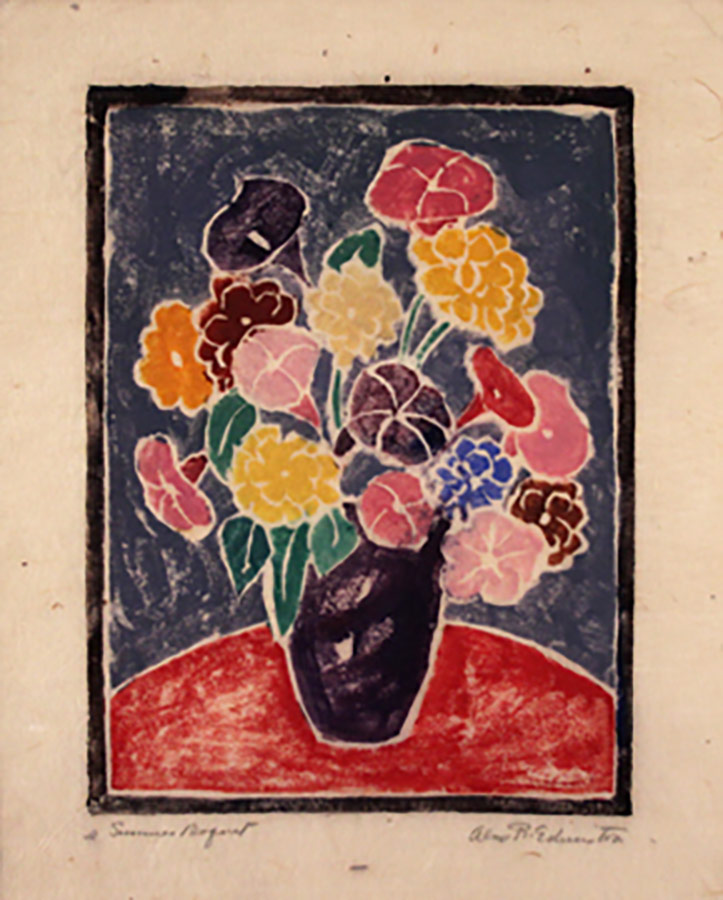
A monoprint, Summer Bouquet, by Alice Righter Edmiston.

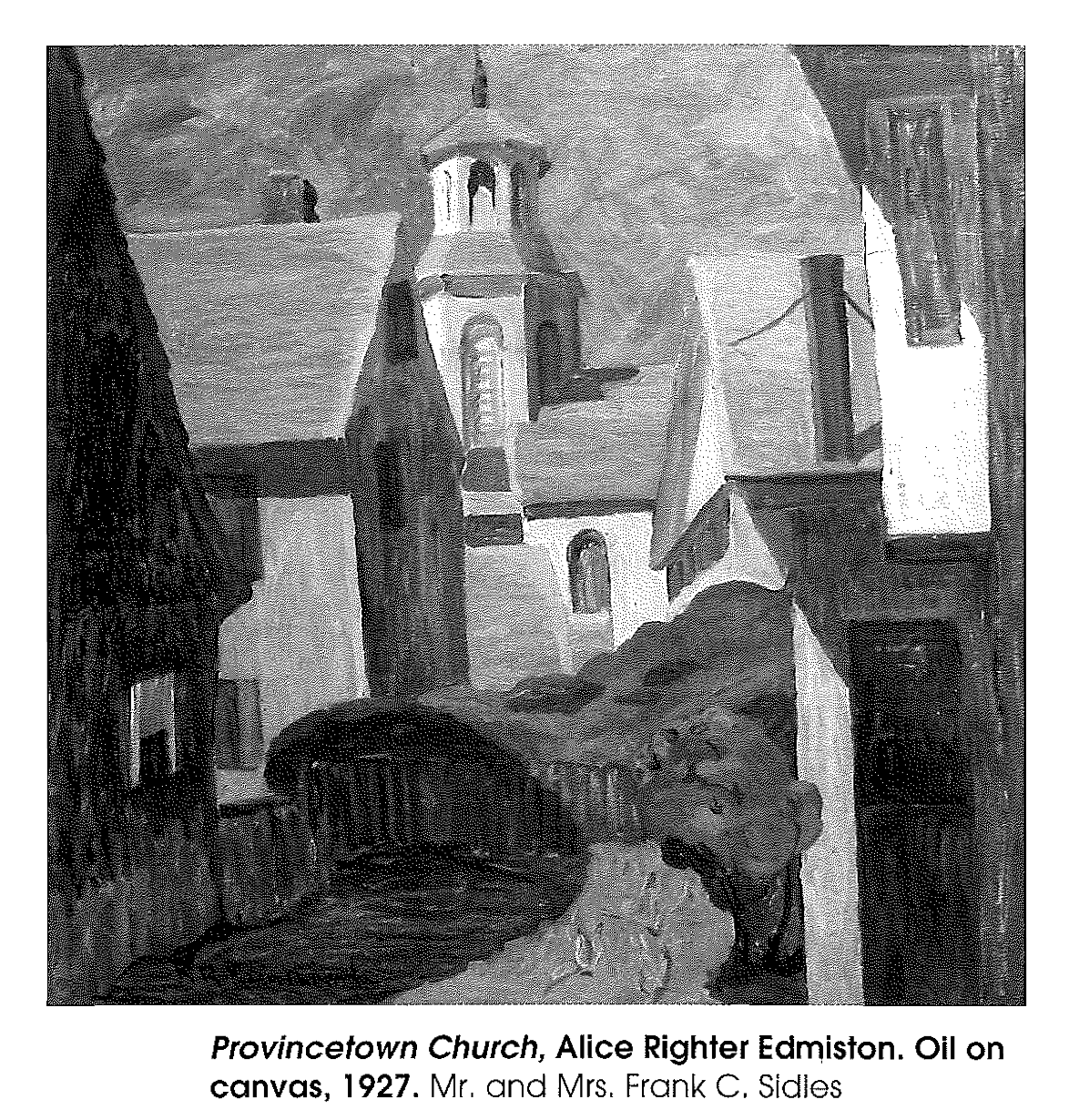
Provincetown Church, 1927, by Alice Righter Edmiston, was exhibited in 2001 in the Great Plains Art Collection.

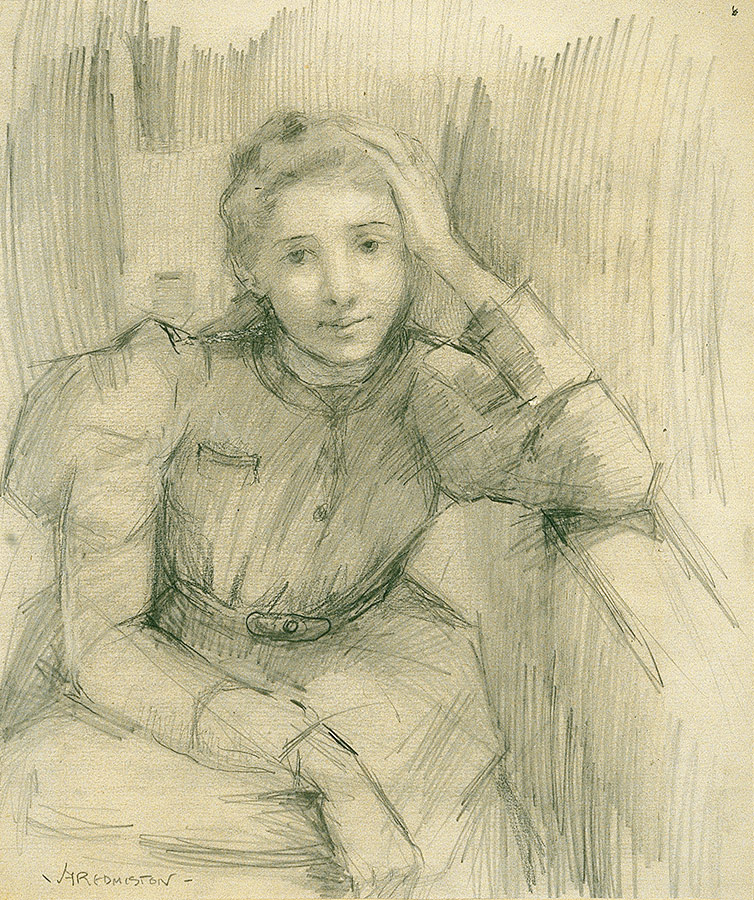
Pencil drawing, Dramatic Teacher, by Alice Righter Edmiston

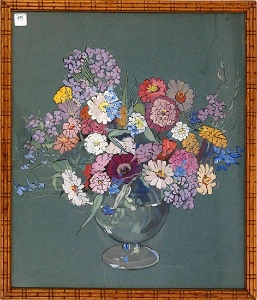
Still life of a vase of flowers by Alice Righter Edmiston

Alice Righter Edmiston (1874–1964) was an American painter and printmaker who taught at universities and contributed to various art organizations in Lincoln, Nebraska, and one in New York City. She has been described as an impressionist-influenced artist who followed modernist trends.

== Biography ==
Alice Laura Righter, A. R. Edmiston, A. L. Edmiston, was born in Monroe, Wisconsin, in 1874, and died in Lincoln, Nebraska, in 1962, at the age of 89. She is buried in Wyuka Cemetery in Lincoln.

She moved with her family to Lincoln when she was four years old, where she attended the University of Nebraska. She was a student of Sarah W. Moore's, one year after the fine arts department had been established in Lincoln. She continued her studies at the School of the Art Institute of Chicago. After a year in Chicago, she moved to New York City and enrolled in the Art Students League. She went to Paris with one of her instructors, Frank Vincent DuMond, and stayed nine months living in the Latin Quarter. She also traveled to Arizona and New Mexico.

She married Arthur Edmiston, an insurance man, in Lincoln, and had three children.

== Career ==
In 1893, she taught art at the University of Nebraska and was assistant to the head of the department, Cora Parker. In 1894, she taught at the Southwest Virginia Institute in Bristol, Virginia. In 1896, she taught at Galloway College in Searcy, Arkansas.

She experimented with oil painting, watercolor, gouache, egg tempera, block prints, lithographs, and monotypes. In 1902, her work was exhibited in the first show of local artists sponsored by the Haydon Art Club, now the Sheldon Museum of Art. In 1898, one of her pastels was shown at the Trans-Mississippi Exposition, Portrait of a Lady. In 1923 she won a $100 prize for her work in the Society of Fine Arts Exhibition in Omaha, Nebraska. In 1934 she was included in the Joslyn Art Museum's Five States exhibition, as she was again in 1936, 1937, 1938, 1940, and 1941. In 1941 she was given a solo show at the Joslyn that focused on her monotypes.

She was one of the first members of the Nebraska Art Association before it merged with the Haydon Art Club, and was the president of the Lincoln Artists Guild in 1920.

Her work is owned by the Vanderpoel Collection in Chicago, Lincoln Public Libraries, the Museum of Nebraska Art, and the Sheldon Museum of Art.

== Legacy ==
She was honored at Nebraska Art Association anniversary celebrations in 1938 and 1963. In 1957, an Omaha World-Herald article about her life was headlined, "A Lively Artist at Age 82."

In January 2018 an exhibition titled "Early Nebraska Women Artists" displayed Edmiston's art at the Peru State Art Gallery as a project of the Museum of Nebraska Art with support from a grant from the Nebraska Arts Council and the Nebraska Cultural Endowment.
