= Jillian McDonald =

Canada-born artist

Jillian McDonald is a conceptual artist and curator from Canada, living in Brooklyn, New York. Her work is often meant to be humorous and features references to popular films. She uses video art, net art, performance art, installations, and photography.

Her interests are American celebrity culture, extreme fandom, and themes and characters from horror films. Recent work includes zombies, the undead, masks, and paranormal experiences, and is often set in northern, rural landscapes such as those found in Scotland, The Yukon, and Newfoundland. In her best-known works she digitally manipulated romantic scenes from Hollywood films starring actors such as Billy Bob Thornton, Vincent Gallo, and Johnny Depp, investigating celebrity obsession. In The Screaming, she inserted herself into horror films such as The Shining and Alien, screaming at the monsters to scare them away or destroy them. In Horror Makeup, she applies makeup on a subway commute, turning herself into a zombie.

== Exhibitions ==
Her 2013 Valley of the Deer installation features a 3-channel video, augmented reality, and drawings created during the Glenfiddich International Artist Residency. It stars residents of Dufftown and other Northern Scottish towns.

- Centre Clark, "Valley of the Deer", Montreal, Canada (2015)
- UWAG, University of Waterloo Art Gallery, "Valley of the Deer", Waterloo, Canada (2015)
- Esker Foundation, "Valley of the Deer", Calgary, Canada (2013)
- Hallwalls, ‘’RedRum", Buffalo, NY (2010)
- Arizona State University Museum, "Alone Together in the Dark", Tempe, AZ (2009 – 2010)
- Lilith Performance Studio, "Undead in the Night", Malmo, Sweden (2009)
