= Pablo Frasconi =

American film director

Pablo Frasconi is an independent filmmaker who has received numerous grants and fellowships regionally and nationally for film production, including from the National Endowment for the Arts, The National Endowment for the Humanities, the American Film Institute, and The Park Foundation. He teaches Editing; Creating Poetic Cinema; Nature, Design & Media; and, The Embedded Story: Designing Digital Landscapes and Languages, at the University of Southern California's School of Cinematic Arts [SCA], in Los Angeles.

Frasconi's films, Survival of a Small City, Towards The Memory of a Revolution and The Woodcuts of Antonio Frasconi have been broadcast on PBS and are distributed by the Museum of Modern Art, The American Federation of Arts and Filmmakers’ Library. His films are in the collections of the Smithsonian Institution, the Museum of Modern Art, the New York Public Library and the Virginia Museum of Arts. His film, "The Longing." premiered at the Santa Barbara International Film Festival. His most recent film, "The Light at Walden," based on Thoreau's writings, premiered at The Wild and Scenic Film Festival, in Nevada City, CA – "where activism gets inspired," and has since won four international awards.

Frasconi is currently in production on THE FILM OF CHANGES based on the ancient Chinese I CHING, and recently received a USC Zumberge Interdisciplinary Grant, with California Poet Laureate Dana Gioia, to complete research on a film about William Everson: The Beat Friar.

Prior to joining SCA, Frasconi taught at the New School for Social Research and the State University of New York at Purchase. He has also taught or lectured at Occidental College; The Beijing Film Academy; The Communications University of China, Beijing; The University of Hawaii, Maui; Pomona College, CA; Tecnologico de Monterrey, Guadalajara, Mexico; and Cinecitta, Rome, Italy.
