= Igor Kopystiansky =

American visual artist (born 1954)

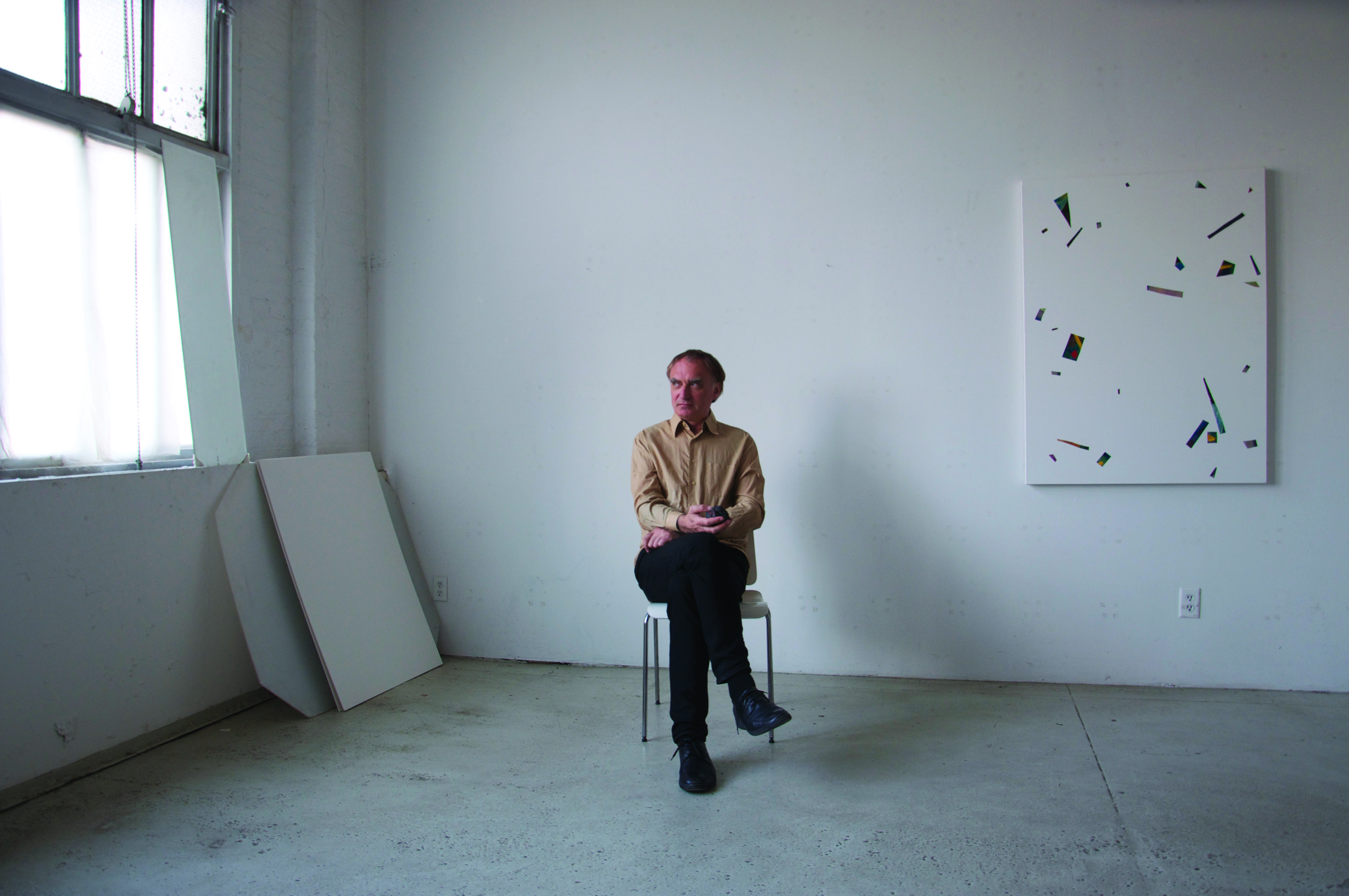
- Igor Kopystiansky in his studio 526 W 26th St. New York, NY.
- Born: 16 December 1954 (age 71); Lviv, Ukrainian SSR, Soviet Union
- Occupation: Visual artist
- Years active: 1988–present
- Spouse: Svetlana Kopystiansky

Igor Kopystiansky (born 16 December 1954 in Lviv) is an American artist, active in New York City since 1988. He has a multimedia practice, including painting, photography, film, and video, with an investigation of painting as his primary paradigm. On works in media of film and video, he collaborates with his wife Svetlana Kopystiansky. His independent works and their joint works are shown internationally and held in American, European and Australian museum collections including MoMA, Metropolitan, Centre Pompidou, Tate Modern, Whitney Museum of American Art, Museum of Fine Arts Houston, Art Institute of Chicago, Walker Art Center, Smithsonian American Art Museum, MAMC+Musée d'art moderne, Folkwang Museum, MMK Museum für Moderne Kunst, ZKM, Museo Nacional Centro de Arte Reina Sofia, Art Gallery of New South Wales. Archives of works by Igor and Svetlana Kopystiansky are located at the Centre Pompidou, Kandinsky Library.

== Work ==
From the late 70s until the late 80s Igor Kopystiansky was part of a second-generation of "Soviet non-conformist artists". In 1979, he turned to the avant-garde tradition. The initial inspiration for his works rooted in ideas of deconstruction and appropriation came from DADA and Marcel Duchamp. These works appropriated images by Western European painters. The new paintings were deliberately created in different sizes compared to the originals. This approach reflects the situation where a work of art functions in society more as a reproduction in a book, poster, or billboard, or when it is viewed on a screen at the cinema, with the size of the image being different from the original painting. The execution of the appropriated paintings was just the first stage in the production of the actual artwork.

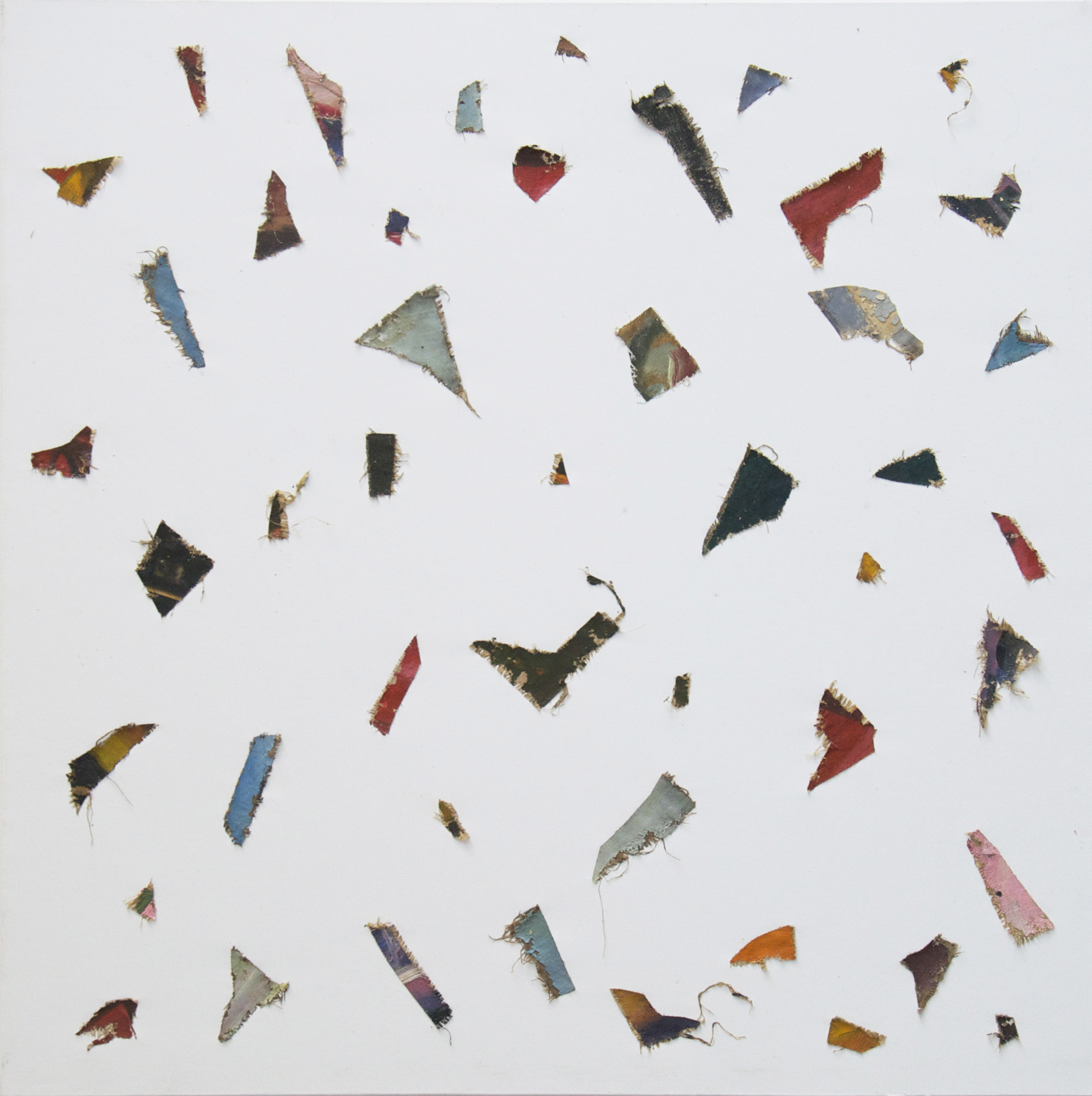
Igor Kopystiansky. The Painting 2008. Collection MFAH, Museum of Fine Arts Houston.

These painted copies were then used to create assemblages or environments referred to as Interiors, where images from various paintings interacted with one another. The final outcome of the entire work would always be revealed only at the last stage, upon completing the installation, remaining absolutely unpredictable beforehand.

Two installations Interiors were a part of an exhibition by Igor and Svetlana held in October 1988 in New York City. From this exhibition both these works were purchased by MAMC, Musée d'art moderne et contemporain, Saint-Etienne, France and Ludwig Forum for international art Aachen, Germany.

Igor Kopystiansky. Interior. 1988. Collection Ludwig Forum Aachen

Interior 1992 was constructed from appropriated paintings by Nicolas Poussin, Claude Lorrain, Caspar David Friedrich, Vermeer, Rembrandt, Jacob van Ruisdael, Pieter Claesz, etc. and was exhibited at Martin Gropius-Bau, Berlin, Kunsthalle Düsseldorf, Museo National Centro de Arte Reina Sofia, Madrid, The Boundary Rider, 9th Biennale of Sydney. Curator Anthony Bond. AGNSW, Sydney, Australia.

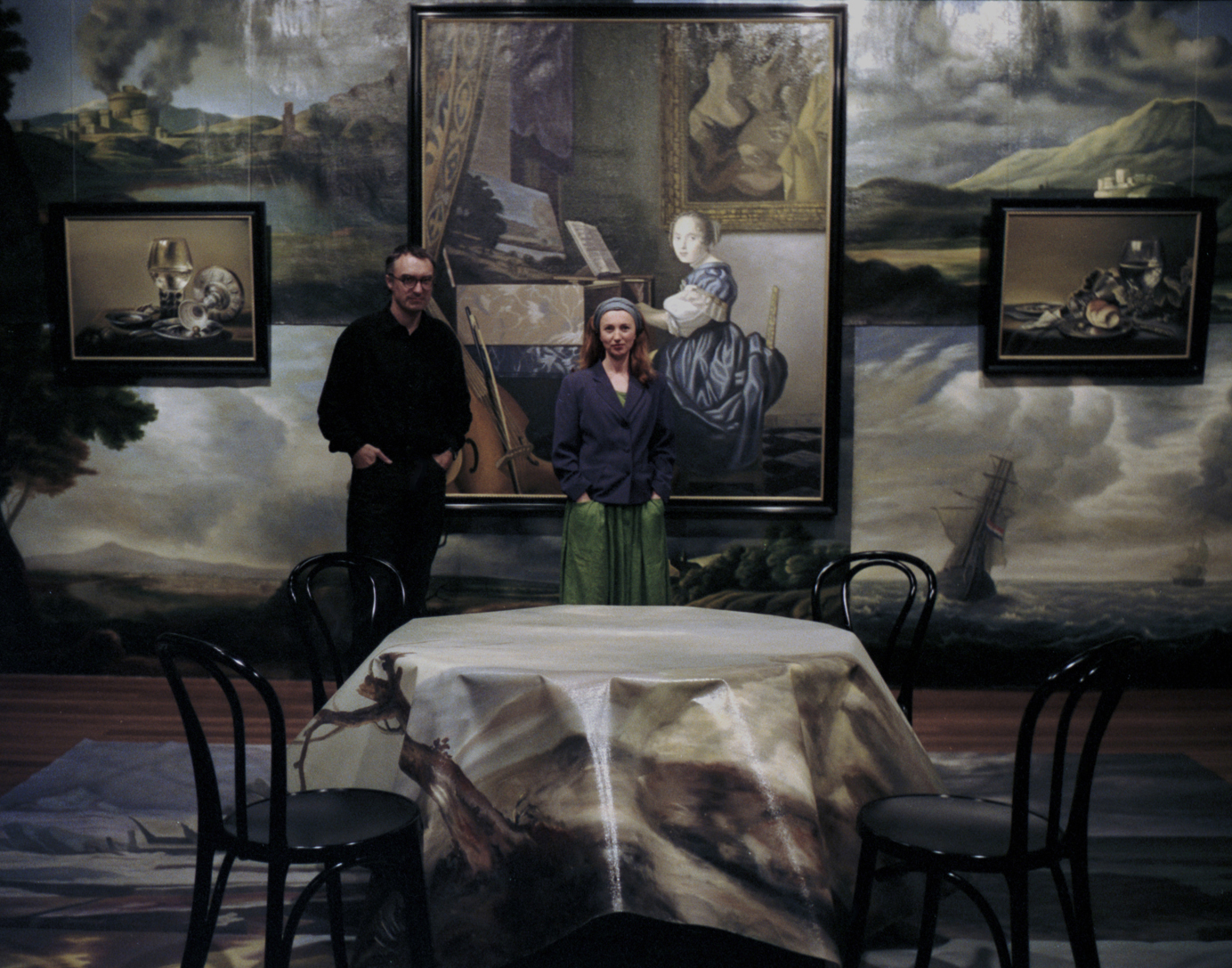
Installation view Kunsthalle Dusseldorf, 1994. Igor and Svetlana Kopystiansky in the installation “Interior”(1992) by Igor Kopystiansky

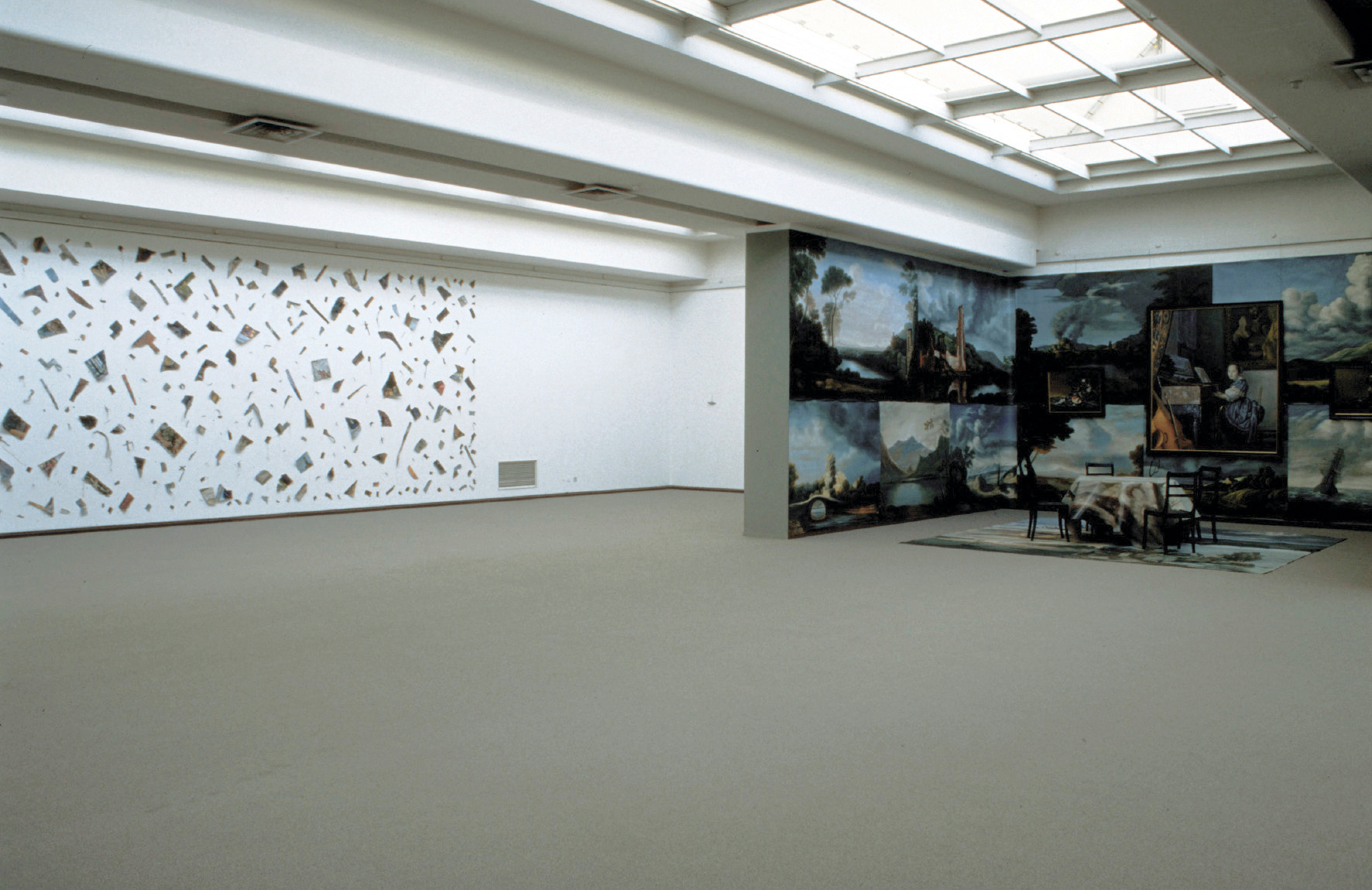
Igor Kopystiansky The Interior and Big Painting Installation view: Kunsthalle Duesseldorf 1994

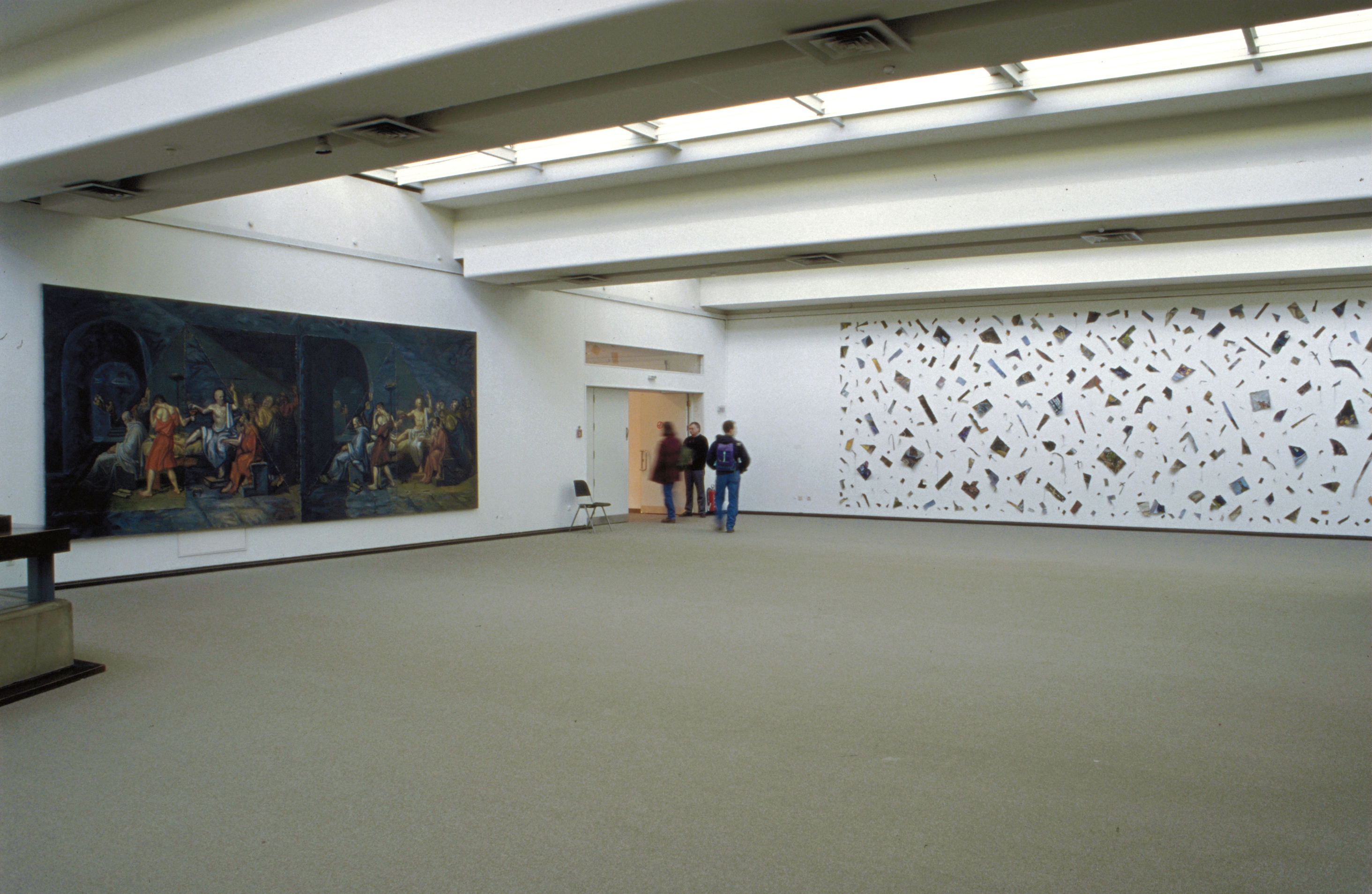
Installation view: The Diptych (1994) after The Death of Socrates and Big Painting (1994) by Igor Kopystiansky at the solo exhibition by Igor and Svetlana Kopystiansky. Kunsthalle Dusseldorf 1994.

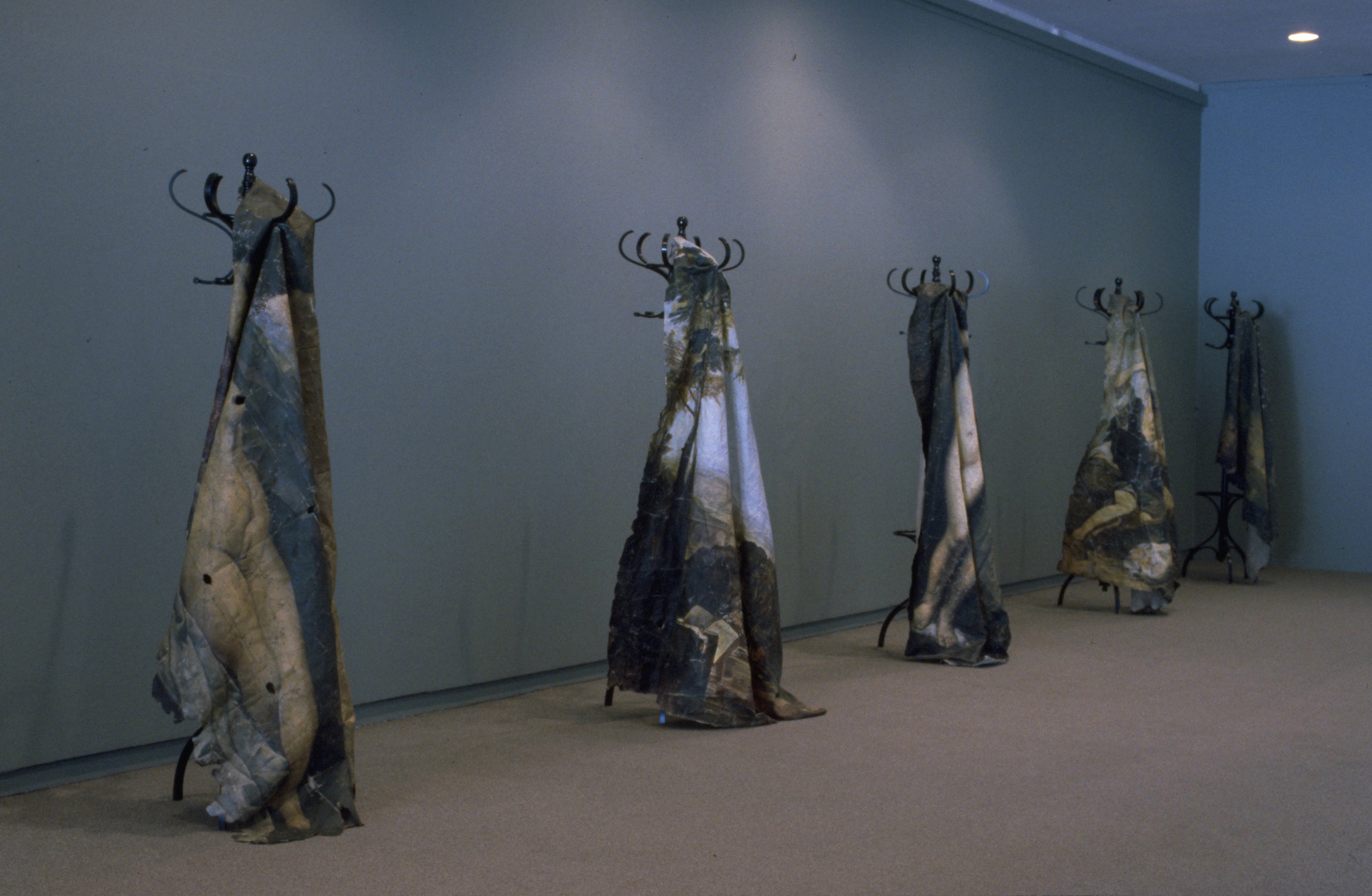
Igor Kopystiansky Transformable paintings 1992 Collection Centre Pompidou MNAM. Installation view: Kunsthalle Düsseldorf, 1994

Parallel to a group of works Interiors were created three dimensional installations entitled Constructions which were “built” or “constructed” using appropriated paintings from various historical periods which interactions within each installation generated a surrealistic effect.

Construction (1988) is represented in collection of the Ludwig Forum for International Art and was produced from appropriated iconic paintings by Franz Marc, Paul Gauguin, Paul Cézanne, André Derain, Maurice de Vlaminck. After being acquired from the 1988 New York City solo exhibition it was exhibited in 1989 as a part of an international exhibition Art of the 10 Recent Years, (Kunst der letzten 10 Jahre) at the MUMOK. Museum of Modern Art, Vienna.

From this group of works in the collection MNAM Centre Pompidou Paris are represented Transformable Paintings(1991). This work does consist from seven paintings based at works of Western-European artists including Titian, Diego Velazquez, Giorgione, Murillo, Tintoretto, Eugène Delacroix which were exhibited and can be exhibited as objects in several different ways.

Compact Paintings (1992) are in the collection of the Centre Pompidou. For each object from the set was produced an oil painted copy of the pre-existing painting. After that a painting was cut in stripes which were rolled and fixed bound with a rope. In this way a two dimensional painting was turned into a three dimensional compact object.

The work The Secret of the Lost (2003) which consists of 18 Compact Paintings is in the collection of Museum Folkwang Essen.

Restored Chairs (1990) consist from 17 wooden chairs installed in a circle. To produce this work were chosen wooden chairs in various shapes which were upholstered with appropriated oil paintings by artists including: Paul Gauguin, Pablo Picasso, Vincent van Gogh, Raphael, Titian, Paul Cézanne, Claude Monet, Pierre-Auguste Renoir, Amedeo Modigliani, Tintoretto. For each chair were used several paintings chosen randomly what resulted in a surrealist unpredictability of their interactions. In such fictional reality took place an application of a utilitarian function to masterpieces and their dadaist stripping from the sacred status for a purpose to reverse a radical gesture by Marcel Duchamp in respect to Fountain (1917) readymade.

The first installation of Restored Chairs was at the international project Anni Novanta, (Nineties) in 1990 which took place at the Galleria Comunale d’Arte Moderna, Bologna; Musei Comunali, Rimini; Ex colonia “Le Navi,” Catolica, Italy.

Restored Chairs among other representative installation works were a part of the solo exhibition held by Igor Kopystiansky at the Kunsthalle Düsseldorf entitled “The Museum.”

The Chair (1989) produced prior to the installation Restored Chairs is represented in the collection of the Museo National Centro de Arte Reina Sofia, Madrid, Spain.

Big Painting (1994) exhibited as a part of the solo exhibition at the Kunsthalle Düsseldorf was created from hundreds of fragments of many individual oil paintings. These fragments in various dimensions emerged as a result of the “deconstruction” of diverse appropriated paintings. During an installation process such fragments were fixed directly at the white wall of the museum creating a rectangle shape 300 x 1100 cm. In result of such creating process Big Painting transformed a number of representational art works into one large abstract painting.

The Painting (2008) represented in the collection of the MFAH, Museum of Fine Arts Houston. is based at the same idea as The Painting (1994).

Big Painting (1989) represented in the collection of the Berlinische Galerie is the work in dialogue with DADA collages. But instead of materials from photographs or disconnected illustrations from catalogs used as a source for their collages by DADA artists, in Big Painting appropriated works by artists including Paul Cézanne and Henri Matisse were combined into one big painting.

The Diptych (1987) from the collection of the MAMC, Musée d'art moderne et contemporain, Saint-Etienne, France was based at the painting The Reader Crowned with Flowers, or Virgil's Muse by Jean-Baptiste Camille Corot from the Louvre collection. It does represent a larger group of works for which production was used the same artistic method when one appropriated painting was cut in a certain selected way and its individual parts were spread and fixed at two canvases. By being “doubled.” in such way the sources painting lost its singularity. After that missing parts at both canvases were repainted in a more expressive manner then originals.

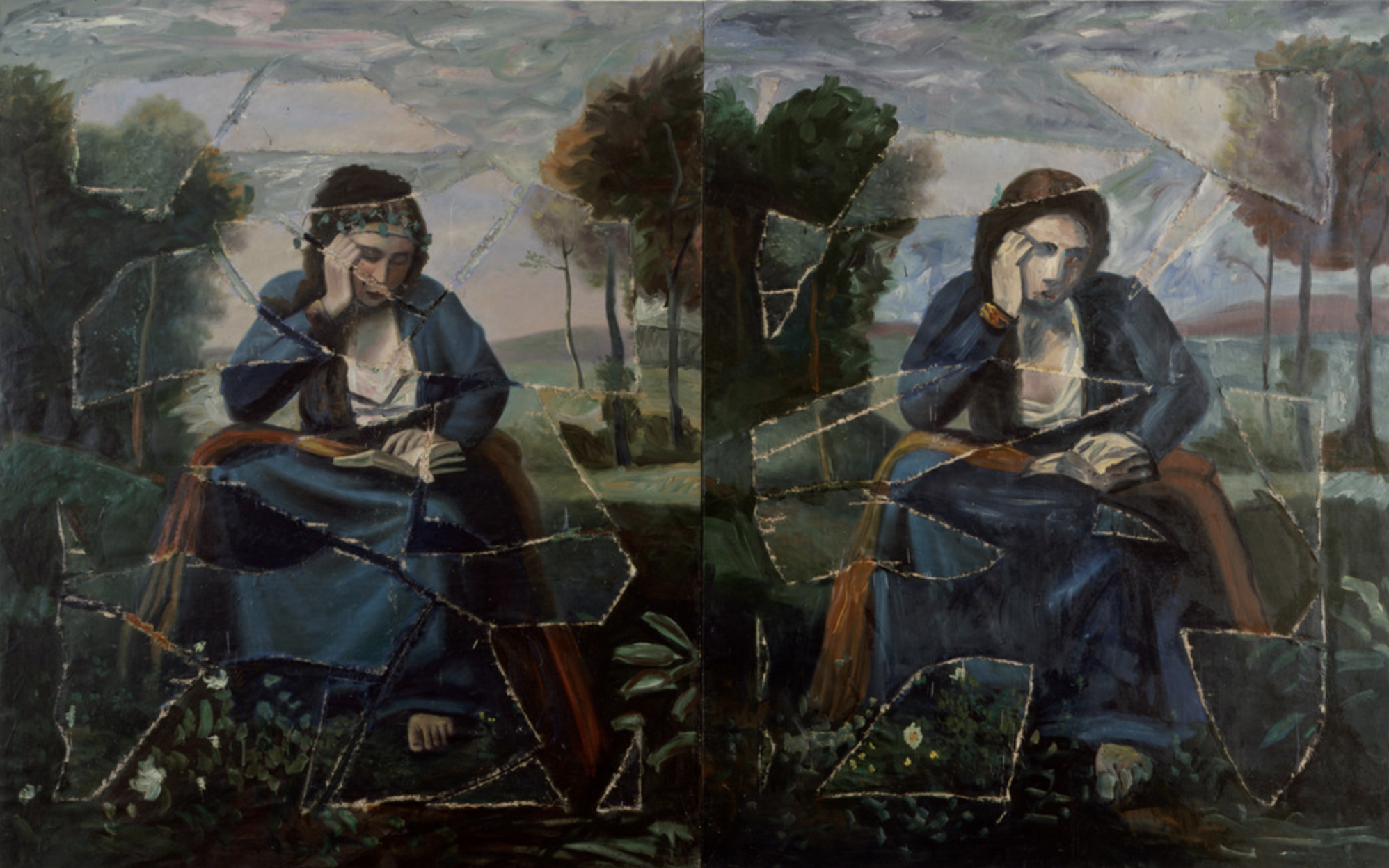
Igor Kopystiansky.The Diptych. 1987. Collection Musée d'art moderne Saint-Étienne

The The Diptych based at The Death of Socrates by Jacques-Louis David from the collection of the Metropolitan Museum was among representative works included into the solo exhibition held by Igor Kopystiansky at the Kunsthalle Düsseldorf in 1994.

In another group of works entitled Diptychs, two appropriated paintings based at two different sources were un-stretched and united into one work by a special and precise installation which transformed them into a three dimensional object which folds shaped by a gravitation exposed material qualities of the oil pained canvas and created a kind of merger between painting and sculpture.

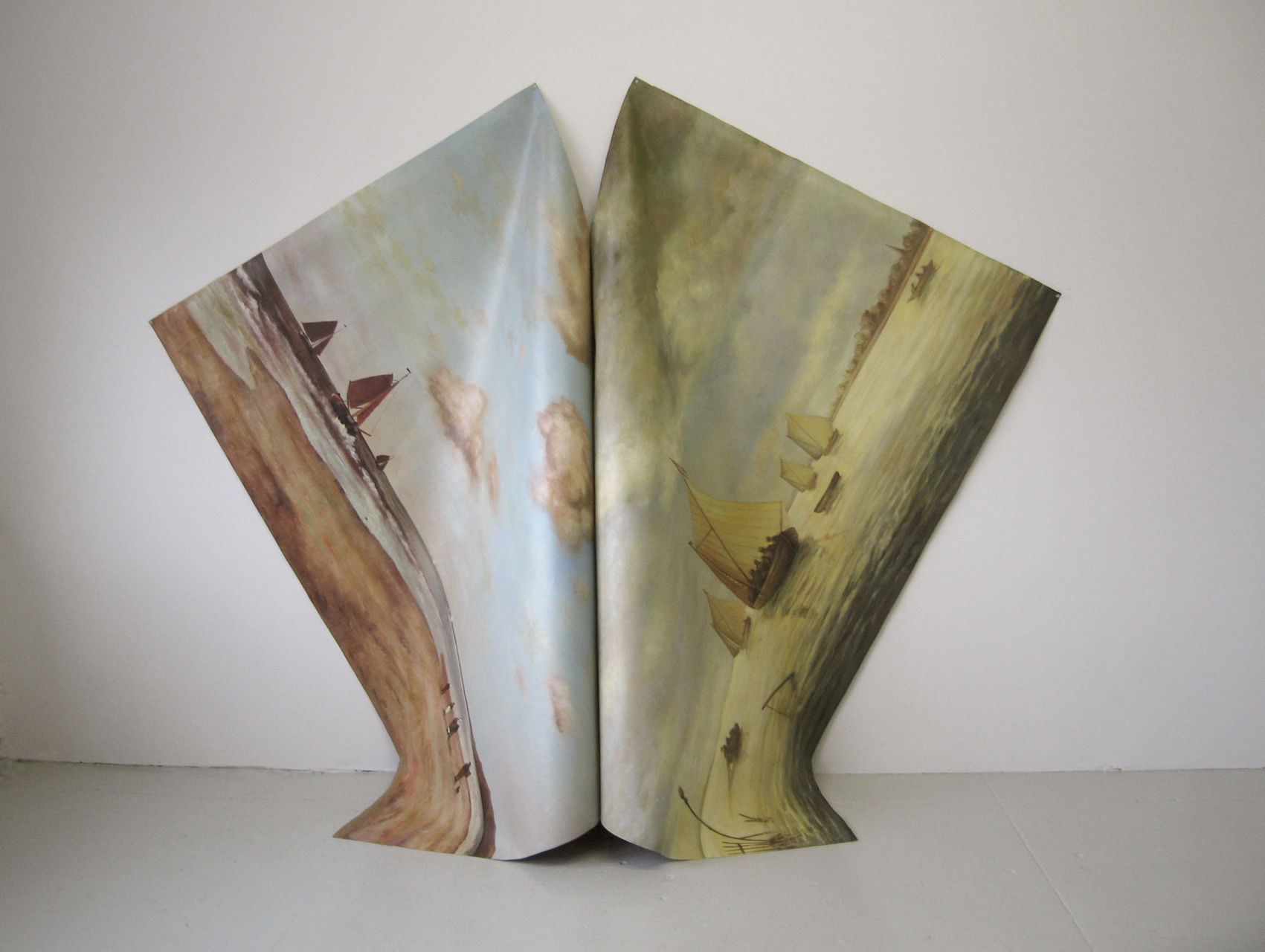
Igor Kopystiansky. The Diptych. 1990. Collection Museo Nacional Centro de Arte Reina Sofia, Madrid, Spain.

The Diptych (1988/1990) constructed from appropriated French and Dutch seascape paintings is represented in the collection of the Museo Nacional Centro de Arte Reina Sofia.

The Diptych which does consist from two appropriated paintings by Caspar David Friedrich is represented in collections of the Berlinische Galerie.

The Carpet (1990) is represented in the collection of the Muzeum Sztuki Lodz. It does consist from 100 fragments of various paintings which were cut into stripes and arranged at the floor as a carpet-like rectangle shape installation. The work was originally produced for the Construction in Process, international exhibition held in Łódź, Poland in 1990.

Destroyed Paintings and Restored Paintings represent two interconnected groups of works in conceptual dialogue with DADA anti-art and anti-painting strategies. One of early examples of Destroyed Paintings is represented in the Collection of the Muzeum Sztuki Lodz, Poland.

Restored Painting (1988) for which as a source was used an appropriated painting Boy with a Dog by Bartolomé Esteban Murillo is a part of the Ludwig Forum Aachen collection. It is a part of a group of appropriated paintings which production went through three successive stages: execution of actual painting, its destruction and the process defined as its restoration. However, all actions which supposed to serve a purpose of “restoration” of the damaged pictorial source were conducted in a deliberately expressive manner. As a result instead of bringing the “damaged” material back to its original shape prior to damages, actions taken at this stage in a contrary increased a distance of the final result from the source of the appropriation.

Igor Kopystiansky’ individual works produced in the media of painting and installation since the early eighties have rightfully been defined as a part of an international art movement known as Appropriation Art.

In 1988, he and his wife and collaborator Svetlana Kopystiansky left the Soviet Union and moved to New York City. In 1990, Svetlana and Igor Kopystiansky received a DAAD artists-in-residency grant that took them from New York to Berlin, Germany, and resulted in their solo museum exhibition with a catalogue curated by René Block for the Berlinische Galerie, Museum of Modern Art, in the Martin Gropius-Bau, Berlin in 1991.

Igor and Svetlana Kopystiansky pursue individual careers, but also regularly work together. His individual and joint practice were shown at museum venues, in important international presentations and are collected by major American, European and Australian museums.

In the collection of the Whitney Museum of American Art Igor and Svetlana are represented with a two screen slide projection installation The Day Before Tomorrow photographed on streets of New York in 1999, the last year of the Millennium.

=== Film/Video works ===
Increasingly the Kopystianskys make video. Their 1996-7 video Incidents, filmed on streets of Chelsea Manhattan was first shown by curator Harald Szeemann in the Lyon Biennale in 1997,. meditates on the potential beauty and pathos of discarded objects, as they are balletically blown around by wind along a city street. The filming of Incidents was made during a period of two years 1996/1997 in Chelsea where has been located artists’ studio, what at that time was largely non-residential area. Artists made filming and editing instantly and continued to work in such way until the video was accomplished. A soundtrack of this work is based exclusively on original recording in the city, which consist from incidental sounds of street life: traffic, conversations, footsteps, etc. A fresh and very common wind from the Hudson River transformed streets into a kind of a stage with actors. Everyday objects: a cup, a newspaper, an umbrella, a cardboard box, plastic bags are blown across the sidewalk and street. Mass-produced discards become large sculptures always in their movement, with constant changes of their sculptural form. Hours of footage carefully collected on many windy days have been edited to capture these magical moments. The wind was playing with these objects, turning and twisting them, bringing them together, and then separating them once more. It looks that the wind was liberating them from a power of gravitation.

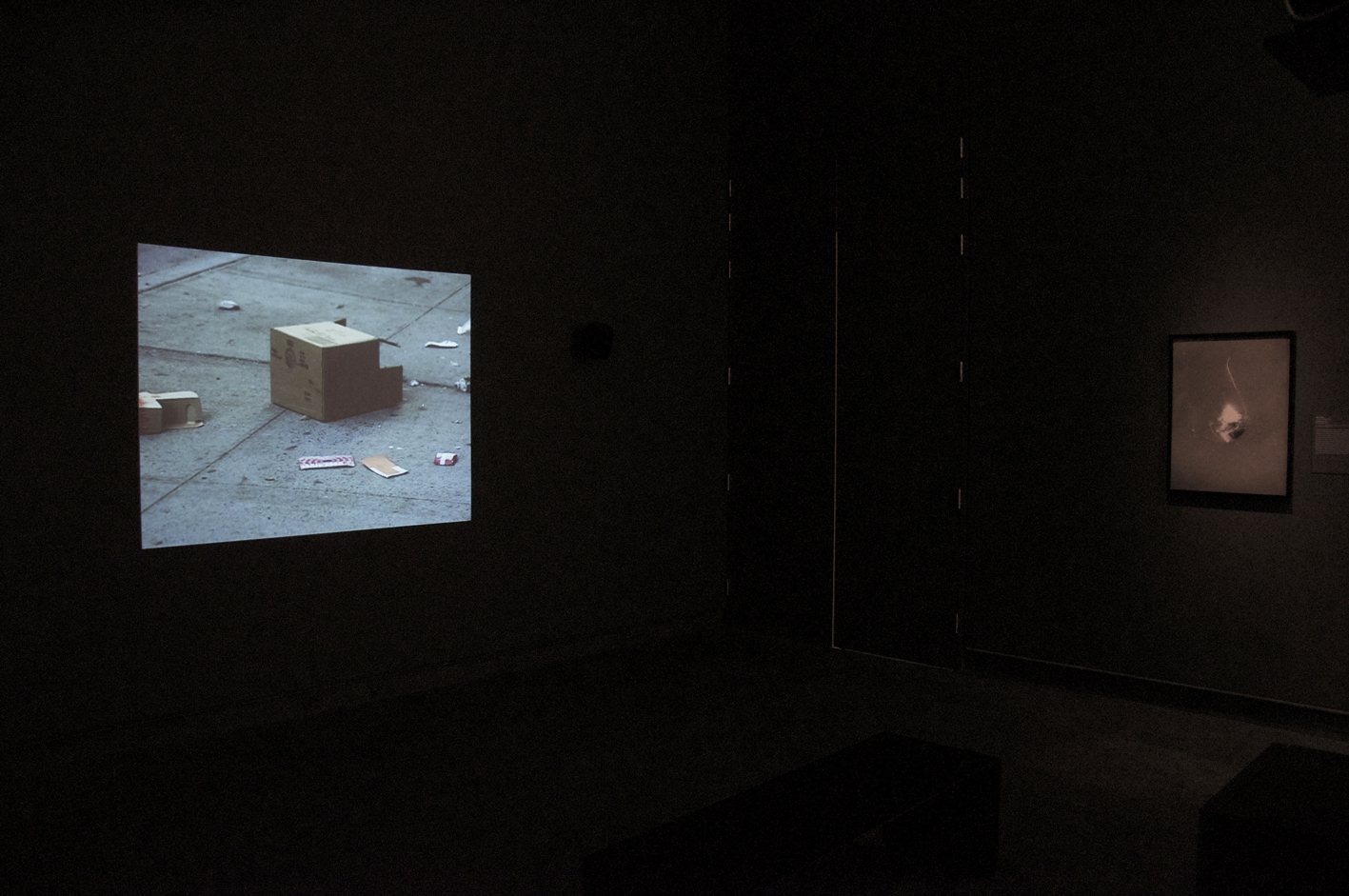
Igor and Svetlana Kopystiansky: Incidents (1996/7). Installation view The Metropolitan Museum of Art. Exhibition: Everyday Epiphanies. Photography and Daily Life Since 1969.

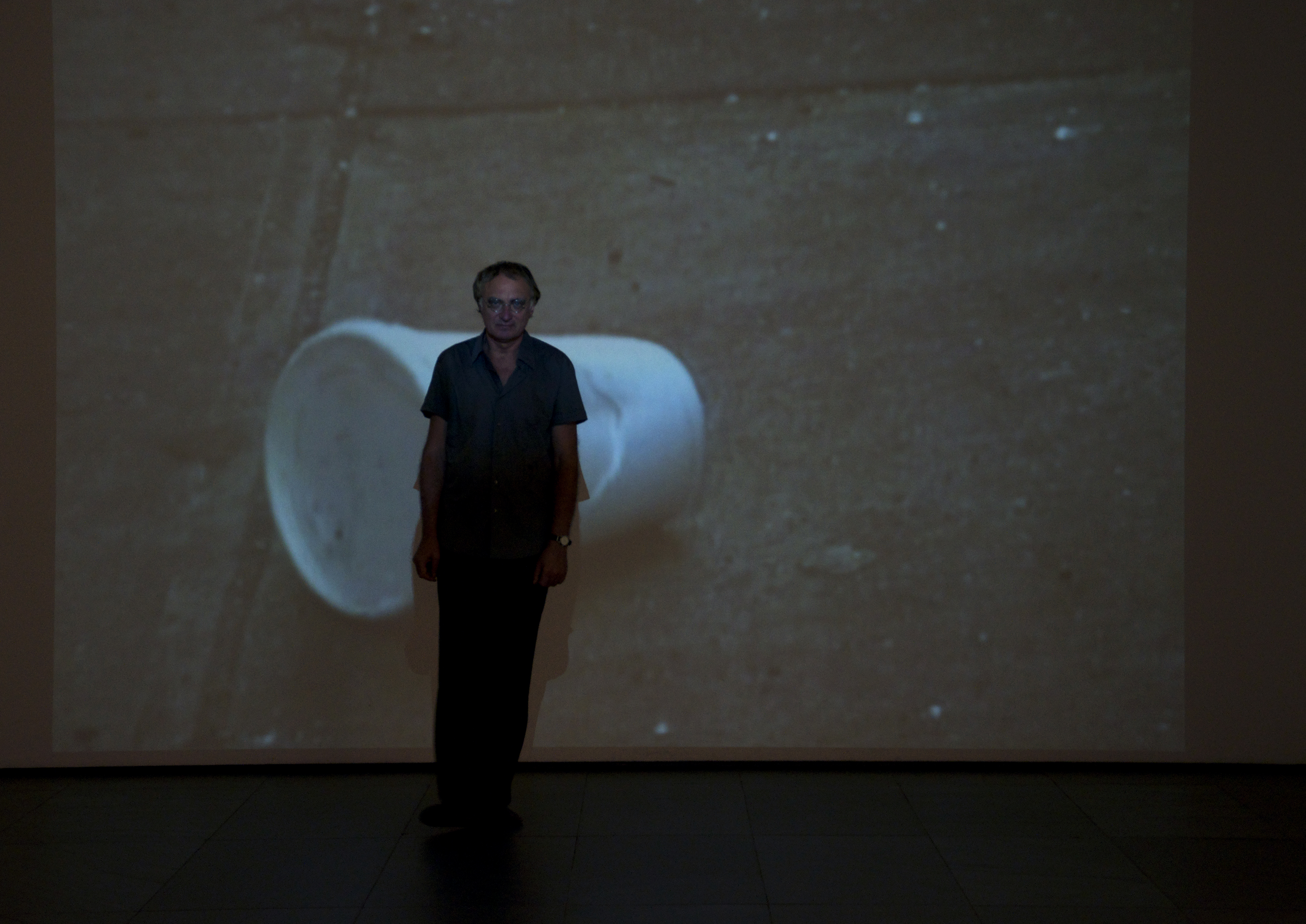
Igor Kopystiansky, at the exhibition of Incidents at MoMA, New York, 2012. Collection MoMA.

Incidents were produced in a limited editions which were acquired and become a part of collections of MoMA, Metropolitan, Centre Pompidou, Museum of Fine Arts Houston, TATE Modern London, Museum für Moderne Kunst Frankfurt, Germany, AGNSW Sydney and were exhibited as a part of collections by major museums and at important international exhibitions. A complete exhibition history of the video work Incidents (1996/1997) is published in a reference to a purchase at the web site of the MFAH, Museum of Fine Arts Houston, Texas.

Later collaborations, such as 2005's Yellow Sound represented in the collection of Smithsonian American Art Museum takes its title from a Wassily Kandinsky theater production, and its silent structure and running time from John Cage's famous composition 4'33" (1952), in which a piano player sits at the keyboard, lift the lid and stay motionless and silent for the next four minutes and thirty-three seconds. As a source for Yellow Sound,(2005) artists used a found silent film footage with an image of a vinyl record. The original very short film was slowed down to increase its duration to 4:33. During the whole presentation a viewer does see an image, which looks like a still and only dust, scratches and other original damages of the film, which appear and disappear slowly indicate that the time is flowing.

In the video Portrait, 2006, represented in the collection of the Metropolitan Museum, Kopystiansky used a short excerpt from Masculin Feminin by Jean-Luc Godard. This selected clip has been played forward and backward at the same time. As the artists have described their process, "The effect is that most of the time the image is doubled, but in the middle of the program for 1/24th of a second the images merge in one single still. This moment has been determined by the movement of the film in the projection camera.”

In a 2006 film work, Pink and White-A Play in Two Time Directions, artists superimpose the same footage playing forward and in reverse. The suggestive quality of these pieces is enhanced as the time/action moves forward and rewinds, creating a sense of time as both a found event and a lost memory. Pink and White is emphasizing their interest in early cinema, and the surrealist graphic intensity of photographer Man Ray.

Pink and White is related to two other film/video works by Igor and Svetlana Kopystiansky: Double Fiction (2008) and Fiction Double (2008). In both works the entire movie – respectively, The Birds by Alfred Hitchcock and the Breathless by Jean-Luc Godard – have been played in two directions: forward and backward. Their soundtracks, in contradistinction to Pink and White, were appropriated from the original movies. Both movies were created almost at the same time within only a three year difference: 1960 Breathless and 1963 The Birds, both have a dramatic intensity and a fictional film narrative built in a classical way: a narrative time moves straightforward in one direction only. Both films represent an “author’s” cinematography and for artists was important to use classical films which every viewer is keeping in a memory.

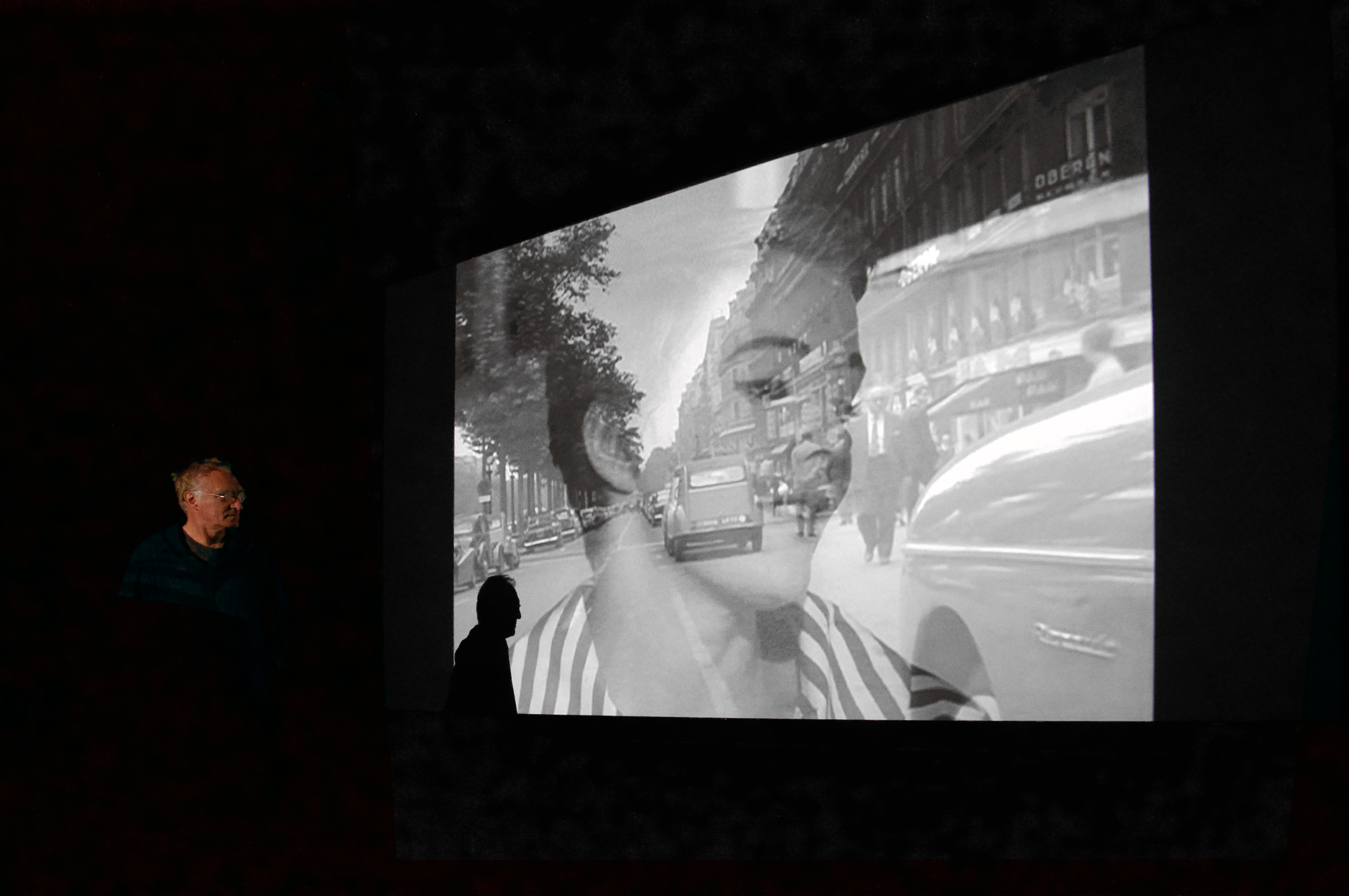
Igor Kopystiansky at the exhibition of Fiction Double at the Centre Pompidou. Collection Centre Pompidou MNAM.

In Double Fiction and Fiction Double respectively, entire film footage of Alfred Hitchcock film The Birds and the entire film footage of Jean-Luc Godard’s Breathless are shown with sound, from beginning to end and over again in reverse, from the end to the beginning simultaneously and both flows of time are visible to the viewer in every moment of the presentation. In this way Kopystiansky’s incorporated the entire film as a found object and re-considered viewer’s reception of narrative time in the classical cinema. In a visual part early scenes are joined with later scenes. At the mid-point, each film becomes one as the superimposed films line up and become a single film. Both time flows heading in opposite directions join for a very brief moment which duration has been defined by a speed of a film presentation: 1/24th of the second. Deconstruction of an original narrative content worked at the same time as a constructive force by creating a new visual and audio quality of the work and producing a new visual object.

In that new work relations between characters have changed and simultaneously new relations have been built, new interactions between them. Characters also interact with themselves being present at the screen in two times at once. Every next image is an unpredictable visual combination. All the music, all noises and each spoken word in the film always have been played twice: in a regular direction and in a reverse. An important part of these works is a verbal language. The sound has been bound to the image and has been played equally either in a regular direction or reversed. In that second case spoken words have been changed to a not recognition and by loosing their communication means gained new qualities and have been turned into abstract Sounds. In respect to “Double Fiction” art historian John Hanhardt summarizes:

"A work of astonishing simplicity and originality, it takes the meta-cinematic work of such artists as Douglas Gordon and Stan Douglas and the treatment of language in Gary Hill’s videotapes into the complex terrain of narrative, storytelling, and perception. The anticipation and remembrance of time and events through the conventions of storytelling, as we see in The Birds, also becomes a means to provide new insight into that film’s apocryphal vision of nature and human relationships. Early scenes are joined with later scenes, and it is almost as if the film itself is dreaming its own narrative as it unfolds. Birds is a brilliant choice, since it heightens the dramatic intensity of the narrative cinema and the nuance of the performances in a deconstruction of the meanings of the original film. It also places the viewer before the screen as an active participant. In a sense, the film haunts itself, as the action that unfolds anticipates its own conclusion, and the relationships between the characters become tragically predicted and realized. The destruction that is foreshadowed actually appears in the film at its beginning.Igor and Svetlana Kopystiansky have created a dialectical process by integrating the point of view of the camera and the play of time. The viewer becomes engaged in active looking and creates meaning out of moving images through that cognitive process. These artists have created an aesthetic text that is haunted by memory, whether represented by found footage, by the chance recordings of plastic bags blowing along on the sidewalk or the movement of people on the street, or by the rediscovery of scenes from well-known movies. Time erases itself as scenes overlap and change, in the process refashioning the moving image into an aesthetic text of timeless fascination.”

Video installation Crossroad (2009) was exhibited for the first time at the solo exhibition by Igor and Svetlana Kopystiansky in the Musée d'Art Moderne de Saint-Etienne Métropole, France in 2010. An unedited solid footage filmed at six different crossroads in the Lower Manhattan was a record of real time: of all events, which took place in a front of the camera with all sounds of an environment. From these 6 video records artists made 3 video programs using two footages for each screen by superimposing them and dissolving one of them very slowly into another one and back during the playback. In this way during a projection images slowly and gradually dissolve from a shot of one location to a shot of another location in the city. At the beginning of each program is only one single frame which represents a perfect image from one location and immediately after that begins a very long and graduate dissolve which ends up with a single frame of another “perfect image” from a second footage. After reaching that point begins equally slow dissolve back to the first footage again. In the rest of the time on each screen is projected a mixture of two different locations and two time pieces what creates a new fictional visual reality. The architecture becomes entirely unreal and a gradual transition between two different locations creates a dislocation of time and place.

A video work Speak when I have nothing to say, (2009) is represented in the collection of the Henry Art Gallery. To produce this work Igor and Svetlana used the cut as a main editing tool: have edited a scene shared by two characters in Michelangelo Antonioni’s classic Italian film L’Eclisse (1962) played by Monica Vitti and Francisco Rabal. The Kopystianskys have removed the spoken dialogue and deconstructed the narrative of the original by cut and repetition of scenes which repeat and return. By that was created a kind of the surrealist effect, a play of time which recalls the function of the memory. The soundtrack of the video work does consist exclusively from original “sounds” which in the original movie filled a time between dialogues. As a result in the absence of spoken dialogue bodily gestures and visual imagery become the predominant language evoking a sense of existential solitude, the sense of distance and isolation in a dialogue with Antonioni’s original film and author’s technique characterized by extended duration.

The six screen video installation Flow exhibited at the Documenta 11 (2002) is the work rooted in the ready-made avant-garde tradition by Marcel Duchamp. It might be thought of as a grand synthesis of certain aspects of Incidents and Fog. Like the former, it is concerned with the discarded object of everyday use, but like the latter, the onward course of rivers is also part of its subject. But rather than focusing on a single setting, New York, the work is also synthetic in the sense that it combines various locales into a single imaginative realm. In opinion of Kai-Uwe Hemken “this fundamental significance in the video installation Flow could also apply to exhibition context of the work i.e., Documenta11 as a whole. The work shows that objects and actions have multiple codes, which can always change further in their content. The different meanings of an object are independent of our opinions and values, with which we attribute an object as a reflection of our entire culture.”

In 2004 the SMoCA Scottsdale Museum of Contemporary Art, Arizona commissioned Igor and Svetlana a video work. For the main work of the project artists decided to film a set with the road in the Arizona desert which does look the most ordinary and “timeless.” It is possible that this site did look exactly in the same way many years ago and could be seen in the same shape by people who moved across this land then.

For the two screen video projection installation entitled Establishing Shot (2004) both channels were shot by the same camera on the same tripod and from the same position. At the beginning of the program projected at the left screen, the camera moves from left to right and back again. At the same time at the right screen it moves from right to left and back. In this way by approaching the middle of the program the pictured slices of the panorama grow nearer each other until they eventually reflect what does look like an identical image in the very middle of the program. After that at both screens begins the reverse movement which finally results in a return to initial views of the panorama which are opposite to each other. A title Establishing Shot does refer to an establishing shot in filmmaking, what is a shot that sets up, or establishes, the context for a scene. It is generally a long or extreme-long shot at the beginning of a scene indicating where, and sometimes when, the remainder of the scene takes place.

Both projections seem to be photograph-like and look like stills. But the stillness of the image is an illusion and despite the movement seems to be motionless, the time which unstoppably moves ahead and it’s perception become a main actor of the play in viewer’s consciousness. In this way in the work eliding the languages of photograph and film. The work plays with and investigates the nature of the filmic medium itself: film is constituted by a succession of still images, which are the only reality, and their ‘movement’ is a result of a purely mechanical shift between the lens and a source of light of the projection camera. As the film history does consist from movies shot at the black and white and color film, the two screen Establishing Shot (2004) was produced in black and white. The one screen work Establishing Shot (2004) was produced as one screen installation in which both channels in color have been superimposed and the viewer can see the flow of time simultaneously at one screen.

At the SMoCA Scottsdale Museum of Contemporary Art from 1999 is permanently on view Knight Rise skyspace, by James Turrell. As Turrell says, his work provides the opportunity to “look at our own looking.” Establishing Shot by Igor and Svetlana Kopystiansky does offer viewers an opportunity to look in a stillness of the desert at their own perception of the time flow.

The commissioned two screen video projection installation Sandglass. Establishing Shot. (2004), was exhibited at SMoCA (2005) and at the Lisson Gallery London (2006), Kunsthalle Fridericianum Kassel (2006) and Espoo Museum of Modern Art (2007).

== Exhibitions ==
Kopystiansky’s individual and collaborative works has been featured in the MoMA, Metropolitan Museum in New York City; Centre Pompidou, Paris; Centre Pompidou Metz; Tate Modern, London; Tate Gellery Liverpool; Museo Reina Sofia, Madrid; Smithsonian American Art Museum, Washington, D.C.; Art Institute of Chicago; Museum of Fine Arts, Houston, MFAH Texas; MCA Chicago; Whitechapel Art Gallery, London; Museum für Moderne Kunst, MMK Frankfurt am Main; Deichtorhallen Hamburg; Kunsthalle zu Kiel; Stedelijk Museum voor Actuele Kunst SMAK Gent; Art Gallery of New South Wales AGNSW, Sydney; Museum of Contemporary Art, Vigo, Spain; MUMOK, Vienna; Henry Art Gallery, Seattle. Igor and Svetlana Kopystiansky had solo exhibitions at the Musée d’Art Moderne de Saint-Etienne, France; Kunsthalle Düsseldorf; Sprengel Museum Hannover; Kunsthalle Fridericianum, Kassel; Martin-Gropius-Bau/Berlinische Galerie; Espoo Museum of Modern Art, Finland; Scottsdale Museum of Contemporary Art SMoCA Arizona; Fine Arts Center UMass, Amherst; GAMeC, Bergamo; Muzeum Sztuki in Łodz, Poland; Lithuanian National Museum in Vilnius, Lithuania.

His individual and joint practice were shown in major international presentations, including the 1988 Venice Biennial, 1992 Sydney Biennial, the 1994 Sao Paulo Biennial, the 1995 Istanbul Biennial, 1997 Lyon Biennial, 1997 Johannesburg Biennial 1999 Liverpool Biennial and documenta 11 in 2002,

Lisson Gallery represented Igor and Svetlana Kopystiansky from 2001 till 2011. A collaboration with the Lisson gallery started in 2000, when being in New York Igor and Svetlana received an invitation to participate in Video Work, exhibition by the Lisson Gallery in Covent Garden, at 9 Kean Street, April 28 - May 26, London which co-insided with the opening of the Tate Modern. At that exhibition Igor and Svetlana presented their video work Fog (2000) filmed from the Chelsea piers across Hudson River. In 2024 Fog (2000) was acquired by the Walker Art Center. In the exhibition Video Work by the Lisson Gallery participated: Francis Alÿs, Pierre Bismuth, Vanessa Beecroft, Mat Collishaw, Ceal Floyer, Douglas Gordon, Rodney Graham, Igor & Svetlana Kopystiansky, Paul McCarthy, Jonathan Monk, Tony Oursler, Simon Patterson, Julião Sarmento, Marijke van Warmerdam, Jane & Louise Wilson.

At the Armory Show New York in 2001 Lisson gallery presented a video program which included Incidents (1996/1997) by Igor and Svetlana Kopystiansky with video works by Rodney Graham, Francis Alÿs, Jane & Louise Wilson, Julião Sarmento, Simon Patterson, Paul McCarthy, Dan Graham und Pierre Bismuth.

A major part of the first solo exhibition by Igor and Svetlana at the Lisson gallery London in 2002 were installation works filmed on streets of New York City including two screen slide projection installation The Day before Tomorrow (1999) which become a part of the Whitney Museum of American Art collection in 2009.

For the first ttime The Day before Tomorrow was exhibited: Chronos & Kairos: die Zeit in der zeitgenössischen Kunst. Curator René Block. Artists including: Joseph Beuys, George Brecht, Marcel Broodhaers, John Cage, Hanne Darboven, Jan Dibbets, Marcel Duchamp, Hans Peter Feldmann, Robert Fillou, Dick Higgins, Allan Kaprow, On Kawara, Joseph Kosuth, Igor and Svetlana Kopystiansky, George Maciunas, Bruce Nauman, Yoko Ono, Nam June Paik, Man Ray, Dieter Rot, Thomas Ruff, Rosemarie Trockel, Ben Vautier, Wolff Vostell, Andy Warhol, Lawrence Weiner, Emmett Williams. 5 Sept.-7 Nov. 1999.

In 2006 at their second Lisson gallery solo exhibition Igor and Svetlana presented video installation Yellow Sound (2005) which from 2009 is represented in the collection of the Smithsonian American Art Museum in Washington, D.C., two video projection installations (Sandglass) Establishing Shot commissioned by the Scottsdale Contemporary Art museum accompanied by a photographic project Fade also created in the desert of Arizona. Exhibition also included Pink and White presented as a multi screen video installation and paintings by Svetlana Kopystiansky: Landscapes and Seascapes shaped by handwritten text appropriated from poems by Samuel Beckett and works on paper.

The first group exhibition Igor participated at after the immigration to the US was "What is Contemporary Art?” organized by an American curator Dan Cameron. Participated artists were: Fischli-Weiss, Katharina Fritsch, Georg Herold, Rebecca Horn, On Kawara, Mike Kelley, Jeff Koons, Igor Kopystiansky, Sherrie Levine, Tatsuo Miyajima, Walter Obholzer, Meret Oppenheim, Perejaume, Haim Steinbach, Bill Taylor, Jeff Wall. Rooseum, Malmö, Sweden 1989. All works by Kopystiansky exhibited at this project were shortly before that exhibited at the solo exhibition by Igor and Svetlana Kopystiansky in New York City in October 1988.

== Honors and awards ==
- 1990 DAAD Artists-in-Berlin Program
- 2008 Résidences internationales aux Récollets à Paris

== Public collections ==
- Museum of Modern Art, New York, USA.
- Metropolitan Museum of Art, New York, USA.
- Whitney Museum of American Art, New York, USA.
- Art Institute of Chicago, USA.
- MFAH, Museum of Fine Arts, Houston, USA.
- Walker Art Center, Contemporary Art Museum, Minneapolis, USA.
- Smithsonian American Art Museum, Washington D.C., USA.
- Henry Art Gallery in Seattle, USA.
- Centre Pompidou Paris, France.
- Tate Modern, London, UK.
- Folkwang Museum in Essen, Germany.
- Museo Nacional Centro de Arte Reina Sofia, Madrid, Spain.
- Art Gallery of New South Wales, Sydney, Australia.
- Musée d'art moderne Saint-Étienne, France.
- ZKM Center for Art and Media Karlsruhe, Germany.
- Ludwig Forum for International Art, Aachen, Germany.
- Berlinische Galerie,Berlin, Germany.
- Museum für Moderne Kunst, Frankfurt am Main, Germany.
- Frac Corsica France.
- SMoCA, Scottsdale Museum of Contemporary Art, USA.
- MOCAK, Museum of Contemporary Art Krakow, Poland.
- Museum of Art, Łódź, Poland.
- Tartu Art Museum, Tartu Kunstimuuseum Estonia.
- Arter. Vehbi Koç Foundation, Istanbul, Turkey.
- The Lithuanian National Museum of Art. Vilnius, Lithuania.
- Zimmerli Art Museum, Rutgers, The State University of New Jersey, New Brunswick, NJ, USA.

== Archives ==
- Fonds Igor et Svetlana Kopystiansky. Bibliothèque Kandinsky, Centre Pompidou.

== Publications ==
- "Igor & Svetlana Kopystiansky". The Lithuanian National Museum of Art. 2023. Foreword: Arūnas Gelūnas. Texts by Michel Gauthier, John G. Hanhardt. Quotations from texts about Kopystiansky's by Kai-Uwe Hemken, Philippe-Alain Michaud, Anthony Spira, Adam D. Weinberg.(Lithuanian, English, French) ISBN 9786094261824
- Kopystiansky: Double Fiction/Fiction Double. Published on the occasion of the solo exhibition at the Musée d"Art Moderne de Saint-Étienne. 2010. Texts by John G. Hanhardt, Philippe-Alain Michaud. Les Presses du Réel. ISBN 9782840663744
- "Igor & Svetlana Kopystiansky." Published on the occasion of the solo exhibition at the EMMA – Espoo Museum of Modern Art, Helsinki, 2007. Texts by Timo Valjakka, Anthony Spira, Barry Schwabsky, (English, Finnish, Swedish), EMMA – Espoo Museum of Modern Art, Helsinki. ISBN 9789525509007
- "Igor & Svetlana Kopystiansky: The Day before Tomorrow". Published on the occasion of the solo exhibition at the Kunsthalle Fridericianum, Kassel and Fine Arts Centre of UMass, Amherst, Massachusetts, 2005. With introduction by René Block and Loretta Yarlow and texts by Adam D. Weinberg, Barry Schwabsky, Andreas Bee, Anthony Bond, Kai-Uwe Hemken. (English and German), ISBN 9780929597195
- "Igor & Svetlana Kopystiansky: Tracking Shot." With texts by Barry Schwabsky, Andreas Bee, Anthony Bond. (English and Spanish), Distrito4, 2004. Madrid, Spain ISBN 9788493342265
- "Igor & Svetlana Kopystiansky: Dialog," Published on the occasion of the solo exhibition at the IFA Galerie Berlin, 1998. Institut für Auslandsbeziehungen Stuttgart/Berlin.
- "Igor Kopystiansky: Exhibition of Paintings." 2nd Johannesburg Biennale, 1997. ISBN 9783927869127
- "Igor Kopystiansky: The Museum." Published on the occasion of the solo exhibition at the Kunsthalle Düsseldorf, Germany. 1994.
- "Igor and Svetlana Kopystiansky" Published on the occasion of the solo exhibition at the Martin-Gropius-Bau Berlin, 1991. DAAD. Curator René Block. Texts by Dan Cameron, Joachim Sartorius, Christine Tacke. ISBN 9783893570317
