= Svetlana Kopystiansky =

American-Russian visual artist

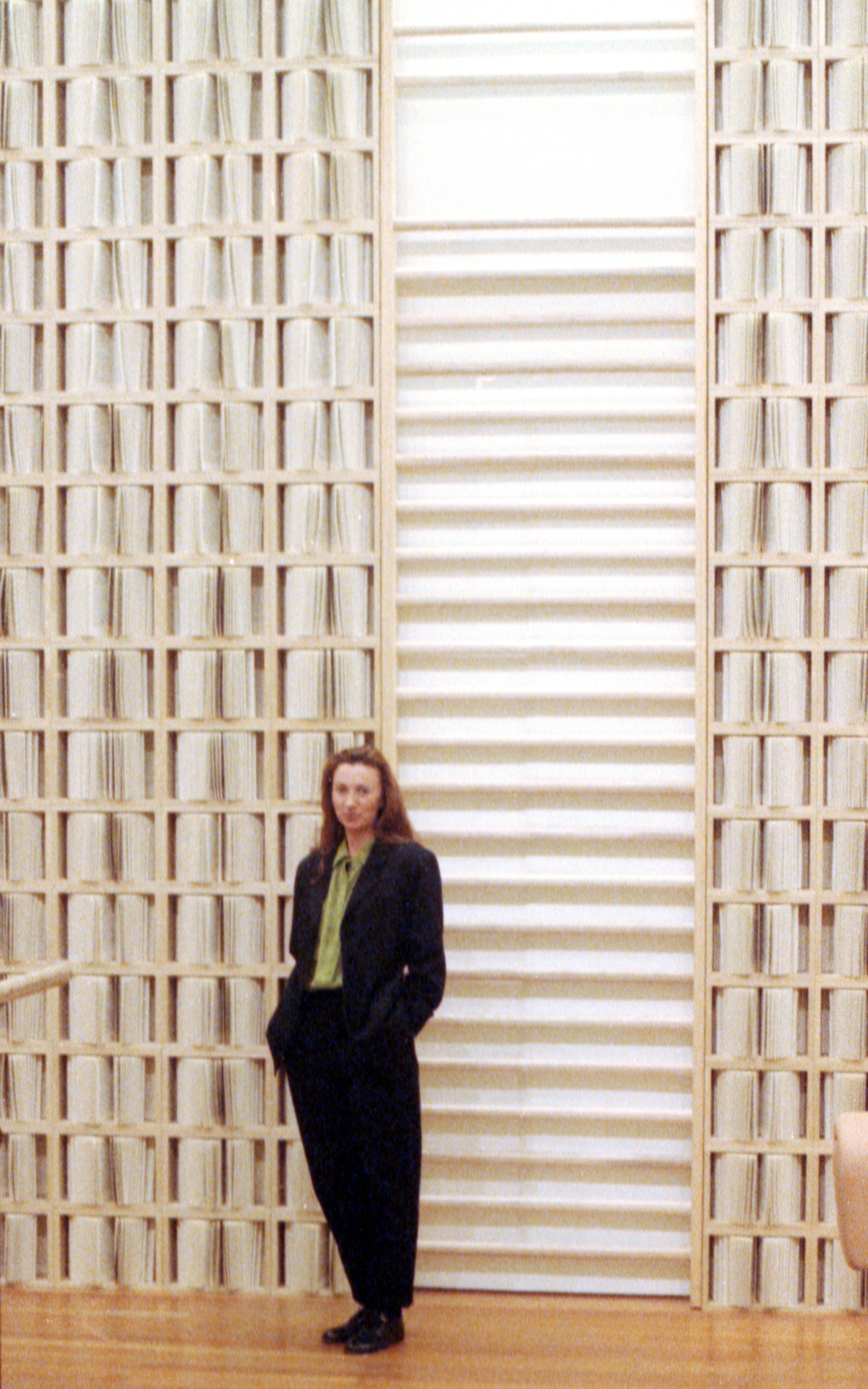
- Svetlana Kopystiansky in the installation Universal Space (1994) Collection Centre Pompidou MNAM Paris
- Born: 1950 (age 75–76); Voronezh, Soviet Union
- Occupation: Artist
- Years active: 1988–present

Svetlana Kopystiansky (born 1950 in Voronezh) is an American artist, active in New York City since 1988. She has a multimedia practice, including painting, photography, film, and video, with an investigation of language as her primary paradigm. On works in media of film and video, she collaborates with her husband Igor Kopystiansky. Her independent works and their joint works are shown internationally and held in American, European and Australian museum collections including MoMA, Metropolitan, Centre Pompidou, Tate Modern, Whitney Museum of American Art, Museum of Fine Arts Houston, Art Institute of Chicago, Walker Art Center, Smithsonian American Art Museum, MMK Museum für Moderne Kunst, ZKM, MUMOK Museo Nacional Centro de Arte Reina Sofia, Art Gallery of New South Wales. Archives by Igor and Svetlana Kopystiansky are located at the Centre Pompidou.

== Work ==
From late Seventies until late Eighties Svetlana Kopystiansky was part of a second-generation of "Soviet non-conformist artists" In 1979, Svetlana Kopystiansky turned to the avant-garde tradition. Her Correct Figures/Incorrect Figures (1979) commented on the work of Malevich, while White Album (1979) was based on the concept of the “found object” introduced by Marcel Duchamp. The works on paper Plays mimicked Samuel Beckett's deadpan humor and meditations on life's banality and contained a reference to Alexander Rodchenko’s ideas. Kopystiansky started working on her two conceptually and formally related series- Landscapes and Seascapes- in 1980. Both series merge text with image: a closer look at either a landscape or seascape reveals a pattern of handwritten text filling the canvas, with excerpts borrowed from classic authors, such as Leo Tolstoy, Samuel Beckett and Paul Eluard. Starting in the early eighties, Kopystiansky began working on a series of paintings that incorporated found texts appropriated from international classical literature. In this particular series of works, she combined both visual and verbal languages, crafting the visual form from handwritten verbal texts. From a distance, these paintings may resemble seascapes or landscapes, but as the viewer approaches them and looks closely, they can discern the verbal text and read it.

In the creation of another series of text-based works, Kopystiansky handwrote found texts, extracted from novels, onto oil-painted canvases. Then were used the specific physical properties of the fabric, such as its elasticity, which allowed an artist to shape them into folds at her will. This way, Svetlana produced paintings where simple geometrical forms were outlined, and the material was arranged freely in various large or small folds. This approach resulted in the deconstruction of the original form of the text, with the new form giving rise to a new sequence of letters and signs. Thus, the visual form takes precedence over the text, causing the viewer's attention to spring back and forth between the visual form and the text, which, however, can no longer be read in its original form, since the words disintegrate and their fragments come together in unbelievable constructions. An interplay emerges between the text-reality and the words, or rather, the visual form of the words, as distinct from their semantic and phonetic aspects. The deconstructed text carries a reference to the ideas of international Avant-Garde and DADA movements.

In 1988, she and her husband and collaborator Igor Kopystiansky left the Soviet Union and moved to New York City, which has been their home base since then.

In 1990 in New York Kopystiansky started a new series of large scale sculptures and installation works constructed from editions of books as found objects or readymades. In this group of works real books were placed in wooden boxes in a way that they become visual objects with pages open towards the viewer. For these works were used editions of novels in English.

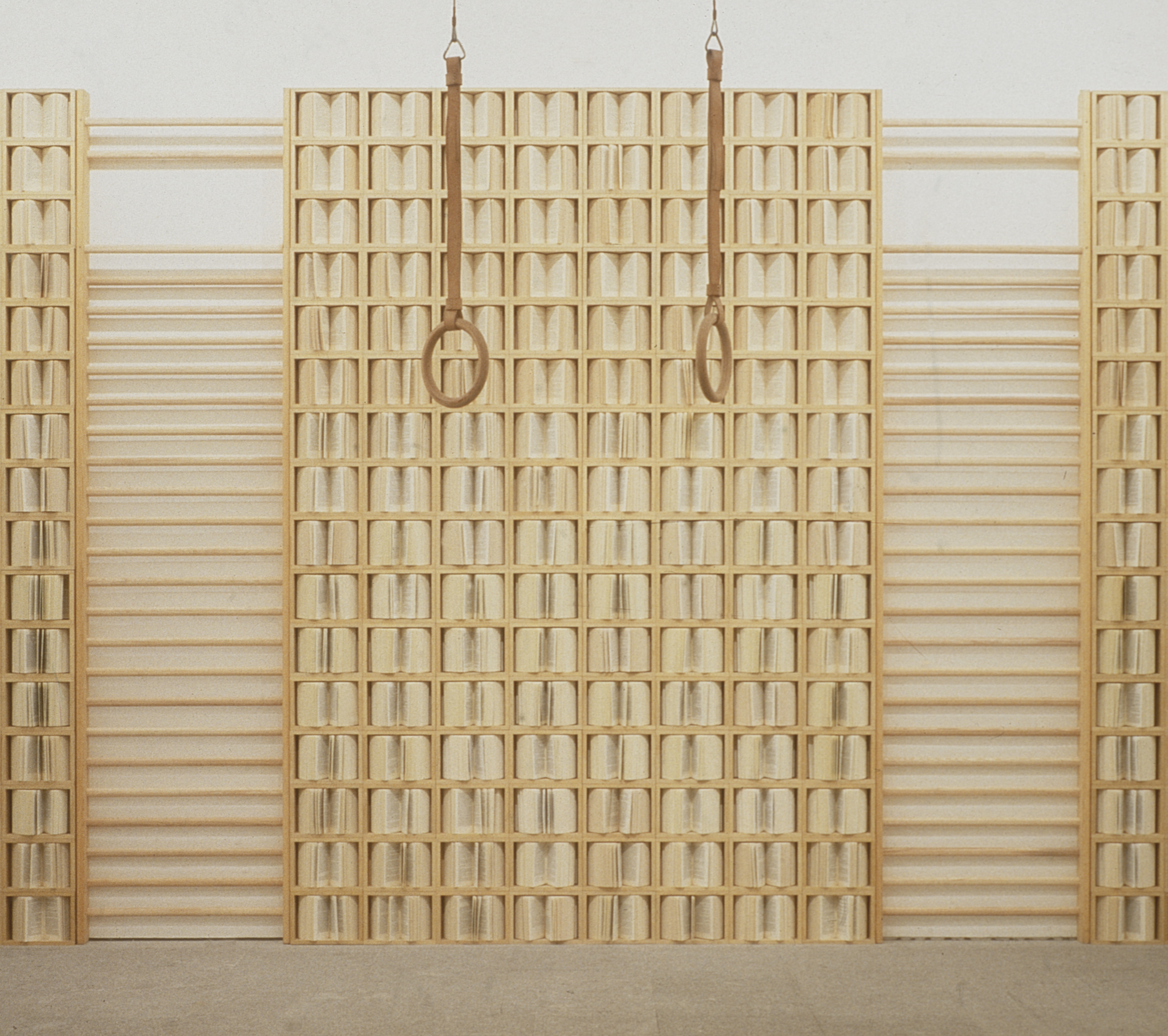
Svetlana Kopystiansky. Universal Space,(1994) Collection of the Centre Pompidou MNAM. Detail of the installation 430 x 880 x 360 cm. Wooden wall bars, gymnastic rings, books. Series of sculptures and installations first exhibited in New York in 1990.

Produced in New York The Library(1990) for which construction were used editions of collected works by Edgar Allan Poe is represented in the collection of MUMOK Vienna. The sculpture was exhibited for the first time at Castelli Graphics New York in 1990.

Universal Space (1994)represented in the collection of the Centre Pompidou was created using real books (editions of novels) and gymnastic equipment. Each book is affixed inside an individual wooden box, concealing the title, but forming a distinct shape from its pages. Both the books and the sports equipment used in this work are found objects. The installation creates a dual-purpose space, combining functions that are not compatible in reality, thus referring to the artistic ideas of surrealism.

For The Library (1994) represented in the collection of Reina Sofia Madrid were used editions of Edith Wharton’s The Custom of the Country and The House of Mirth, and The Song of the Lark by Willa Cather.

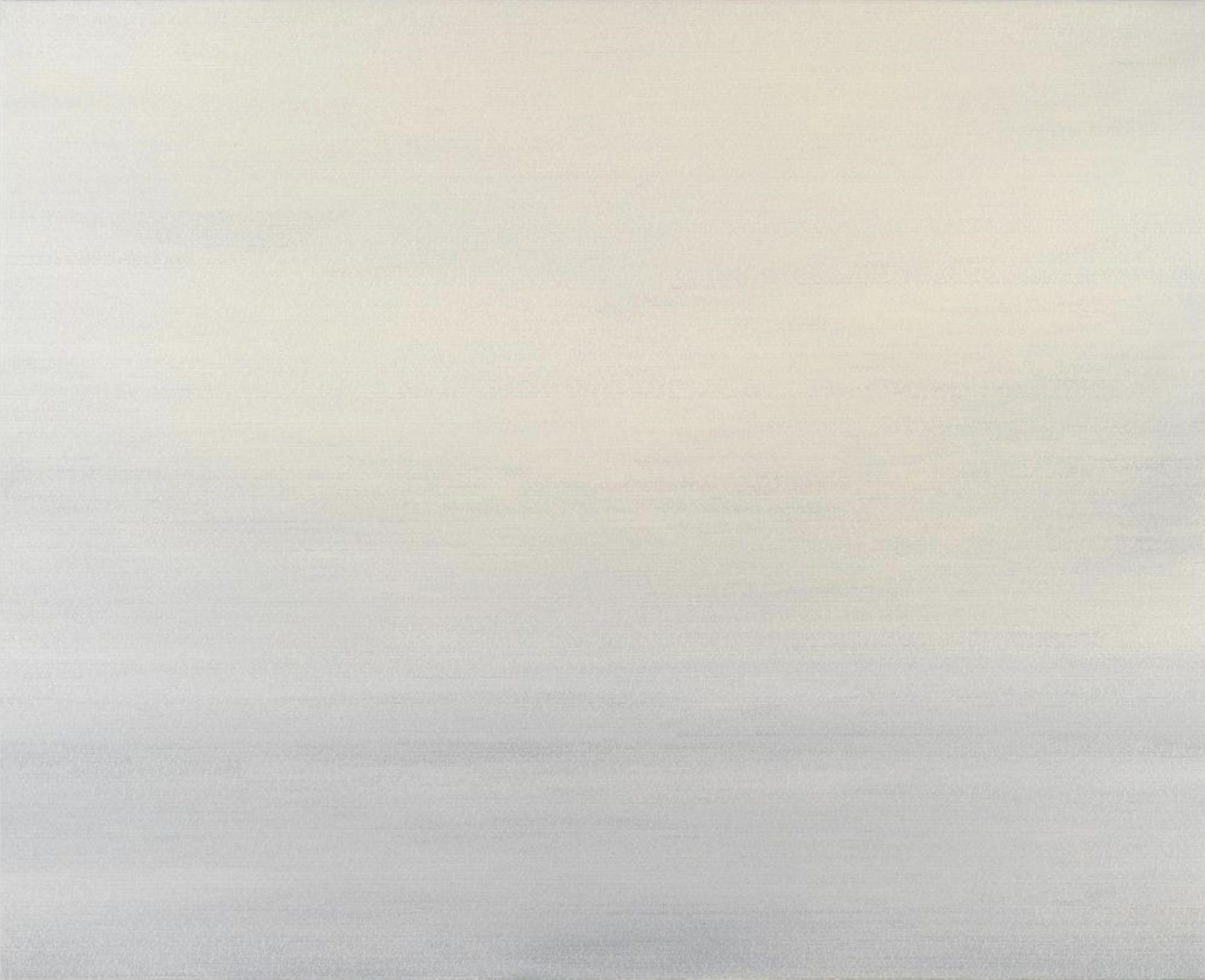
Svetlana Kopystiansky. Seascape, 2006, Collection of the Centre Pompidou MNAM. Oil on canvas, Painted landscape obtained by handwriting a poem by Paul Eluard translated into English by Samuel Beckett and entitled Lady Love.

In 1990, being in New York Svetlana Kopystiansky and Igor Kopystiansky received a DAAD artists-in-residency grant that brought them from the USA to Berlin, Germany, and resulted in their first solo museum exhibition with a catalogue, "In the Tradition," curated by René Block for the Berlinische Galerie, Museum of Modern Art, in the Martin Gropius-Bau, Berlin in 1991.

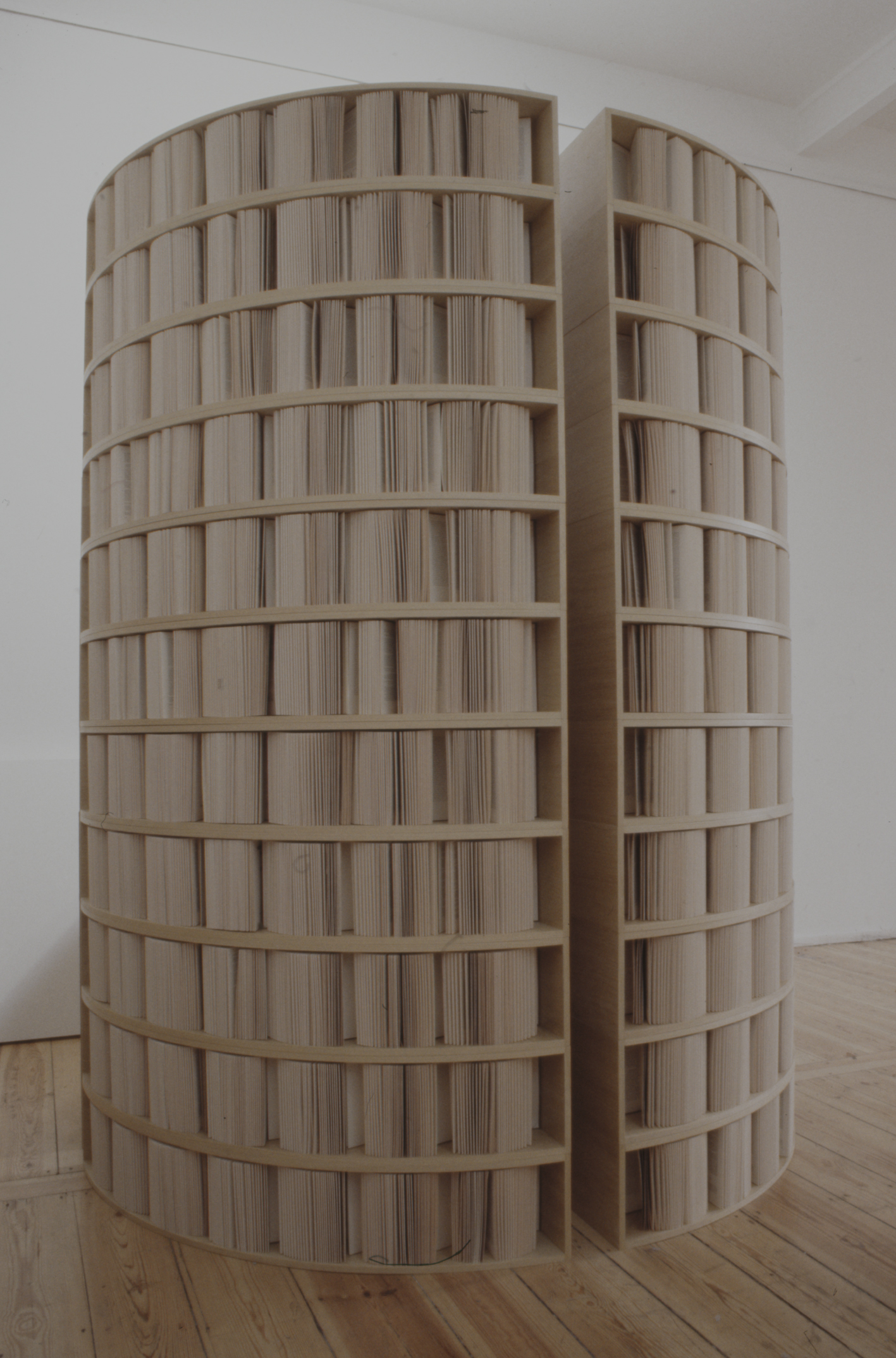
Svetlana Kopystiansky. The Library, 1990. Collection Berlinische Galerie, Museum für Moderne Kunst.

Svetlana Kopystiansky. The Story. 1988. Collection MUMOK. Museum moderner Kunst Stiftung Ludwig Wien, Leihgabe der Österreichischen Ludwig-Stiftung.

In the collection of the Whitney Museum of American Art Igor and Svetlana are represented with a two screen slide projection installation The Day Before Tomorrow photographed on the streets of New York in 1999. The work is exhibited as a two screen slide projection installation. At each screen is projected a slide program from 108 slides shot by one of artists with a dissolve transition between images. The program has a total duration of 16 min and is projected without sound. From more than three thousand slides shot at many locations in Manhattan for the actual work artists selected images shot at 9 different locations in the city. During the work at The Day before Tomorrow one photographic camera was held by Svetlana and the other one by Igor. Artists stood next to each other, a few feet apart, and shot what occurred in front of them – found situations from the real life of the city. Each artist took own decisions regarding when each shot should be made, which moment precisely has to be captured and how long should be a not recorded time gap between two shots. As a result were created two different records from the same event and each of them consists from different captured moments of time. At each slide was captured a moment of time which duration was just a fraction of the second determined by a speed of the shutter. In this way on selected sites were recorded events which unfolded in front of artists and which were entirely unpredictable in their details. Artists made shooting from the real life considering everything what happens in front of their cameras as a theater performed by many anonymous actors. By starting shooting of each scene they never new what will happen. The synchronized images gathered from different neighborhoods are projected without sound. The incidents are not connected to each other, and they flow from the juxtaposition of the two points of view. The differences in the two shots, the delays and anticipations within the action, create a sculptural theater that unfolds at different speeds. Photographs, made on the streets of downtown Manhattan, were taken at eye level. On these images were captured people singularly, in pairs and in small groups who appear to be passing across the scene from left to right or right to left, entering and departing from doorways, standing and talking. The work was shot at the SCALA film, which is a material for a production of genuine back and white slides. Black and white image in photography and film has much longer history then a color image what makes an image look “timeless”. Only certain details of cloth can indicate approximately a historical time when the work was made. For the viewer’s perception of this work as a play of time might be complementary meaningful that all recorded stories took place in 1999, the last year of the Millennium.

As Adam D. Weinberg, Director of the Whitney Museum of American Art, New York did write in his text:

“We wonder whether each screen represents a separate point of view – Igor’s or Svetlana’s – or is each an amalgamated vision. Looking at these screens one experiences the disjunctive parallax of what appears to be, and in fact are, views from two cameras positioned feet apart. For this project, each of the artists indeed snapped an image of the same ‘event’ at a moment of their own choosing. What we see is a project conceived by the couple, executed as individuals and presented as a visual duet. For all its nonchalant, investigative meta-scientific positioning, The Day Before Tomorrow is a tender paean to their relationship – neither vision is dominant, neither more truthful, neither more revealing. In their work Igor and Svetlana are constructing themselves, constructing each other and we the audience don’t know whose work is whose, nor does it matter. The point may be summed up by Philip Roth when he wrote in his novel Counterlife, “We are all the invention of each other, everybody a conjunction conjuring up everyone else. We are all each other’s authors.” In as much as Igor is Svetlana’s author and vice versa, so too are we as much the authors as the viewers.”

=== Film/video works ===
Increasingly the Kopystianskys make video. Their 1996-7 video Incidents, filmed on streets of Chelsea Manhattan was first shown by curator Harald Szeemann in the Lyon Biennale in 1997, meditates on the potential beauty and pathos of discarded objects, as they are balletically blown around by wind along a city street. The filming of Incidents was made during a period of two years 1996/1997 in Chelsea where has been located artists’ studio, what at that time was largely non-residential area. Artists made filming and editing instantly and continued to work in such way until the video was accomplished. A soundtrack of this work is based exclusively on original recording in the city, which consist from incidental sounds of street life: traffic, conversations, footsteps, etc.

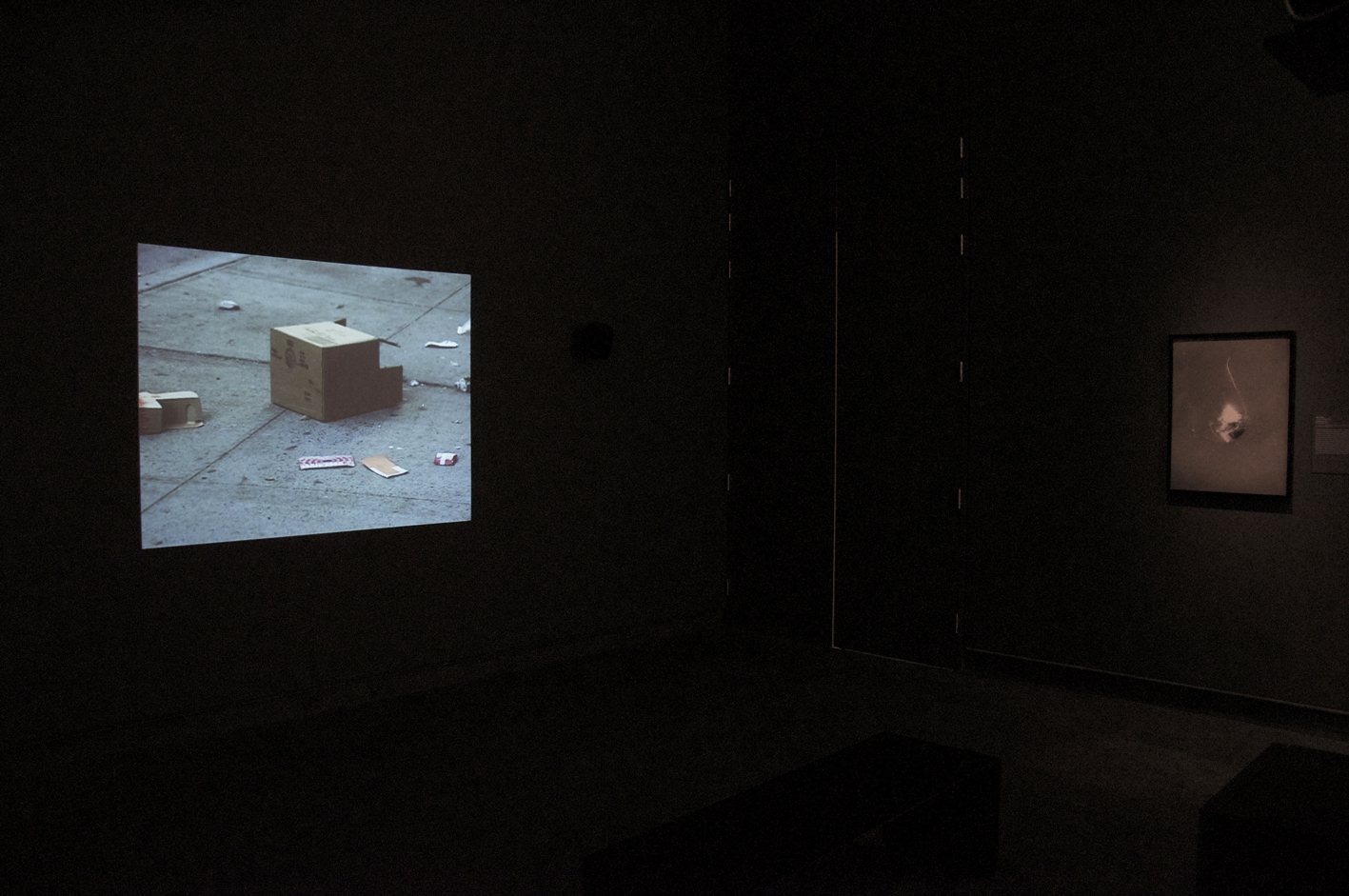
Igor and Svetlana Kopystiansky: Incidents (1996/7). Installation view The Metropolitan Museum of Art. Exhibition: Everyday Epiphanies. Photography and Daily Life Since 1969.

Incidents were produced in a limited editions which were acquired and become a part of collections of MoMA, Metropolitan, Centre Pompidou, Museum of Fine Arts Houston, TATE Modern London, Museum für Moderne Kunst Frankfurt, Germany, AGNSW Sydney and were exhibited as a part of collections by major museums and at important international exhibitions.

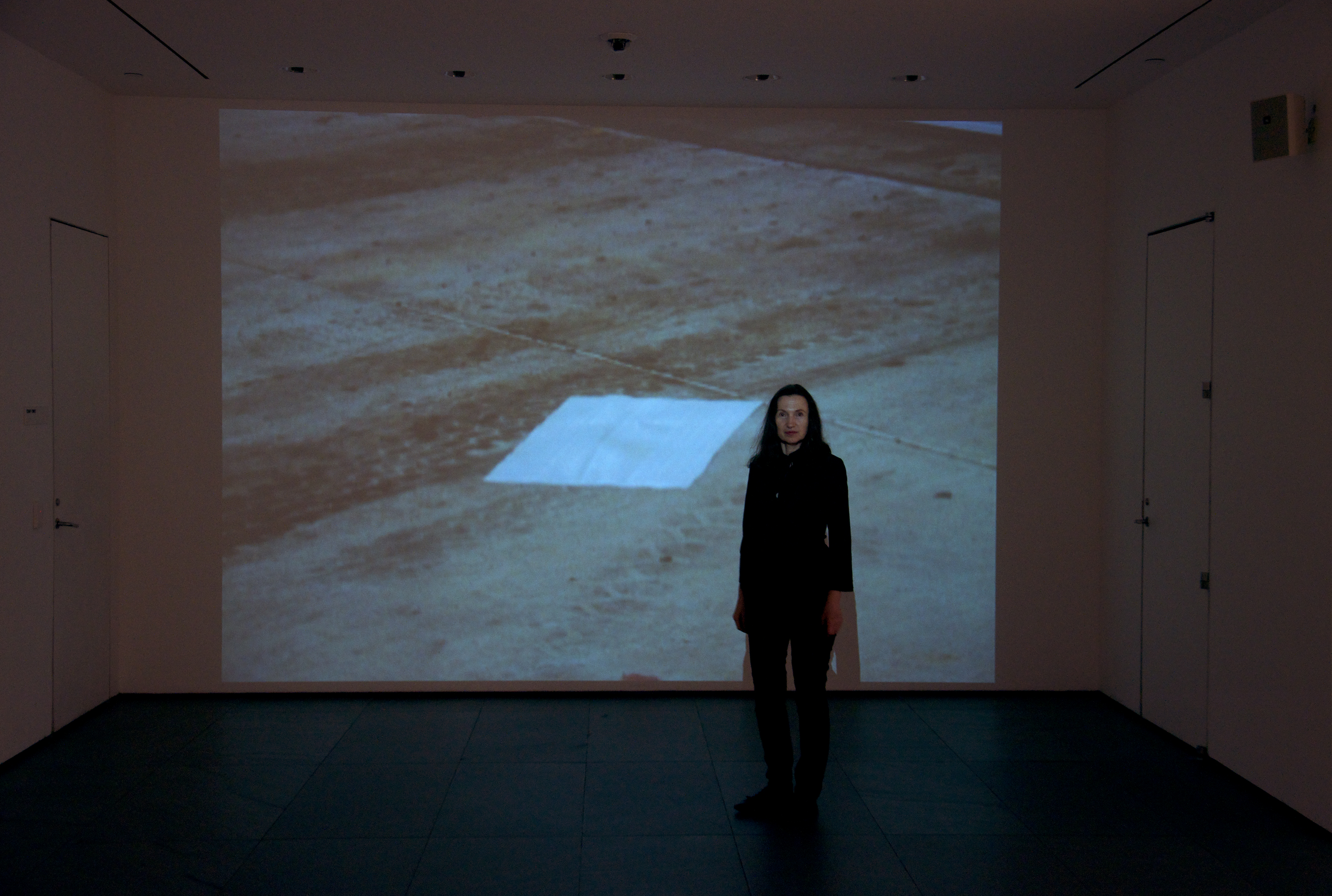
Svetlana Kopystiansky, at the exhibition of Incidents at MoMA, New York, 2012. Collection MoMA.

A complete exhibition history of the video work Incidents (1996/1997) is published in a reference to a purchase at the web site of the MFAH, Museum of Fine Arts Houston, Texas.

Later collaborations, such as 2005's Yellow Sound, represented in the collection of Smithsonian American Art Museum, takes its title from a Wassily Kandinsky theater production, and its silent structure and running time from John Cage's famous composition 4'33" (1952), in which a piano player sits at the keyboard, lift the lid and stay motionless and silent for the next four minutes and thirty-three seconds. As a source for Yellow Sound, (2005) artists used a found silent film footage with an image of a vinyl record. The original very short film was slowed down to increase its duration to 4:33. During the whole presentation a viewer does see an image, which looks like a still and only dust, scratches and other original damages of the film, which appear and disappear slowly indicate that the time is flowing.

In the video Portrait, 2006, represented in the collection of the Metropolitan Museum, Kopystiansky used a short excerpt from Masculin Feminin by Jean-Luc Godard. This selected clip has been played forward and backward at the same time. As the artists have described their process, "The effect is that most of the time the image is doubled, but in the middle of the program for 1/24th of a second the images merge in one single still. This moment has been determined by the movement of the film in the projection camera.”

In a 2006 film work, Pink and White- A Play in Two Time Directions, artists superimpose the same footage playing forward and in reverse.

Pink and White is related to two other film/video works by Igor and Svetlana Kopystiansky: Double Fiction (2008) and Fiction Double (2008).

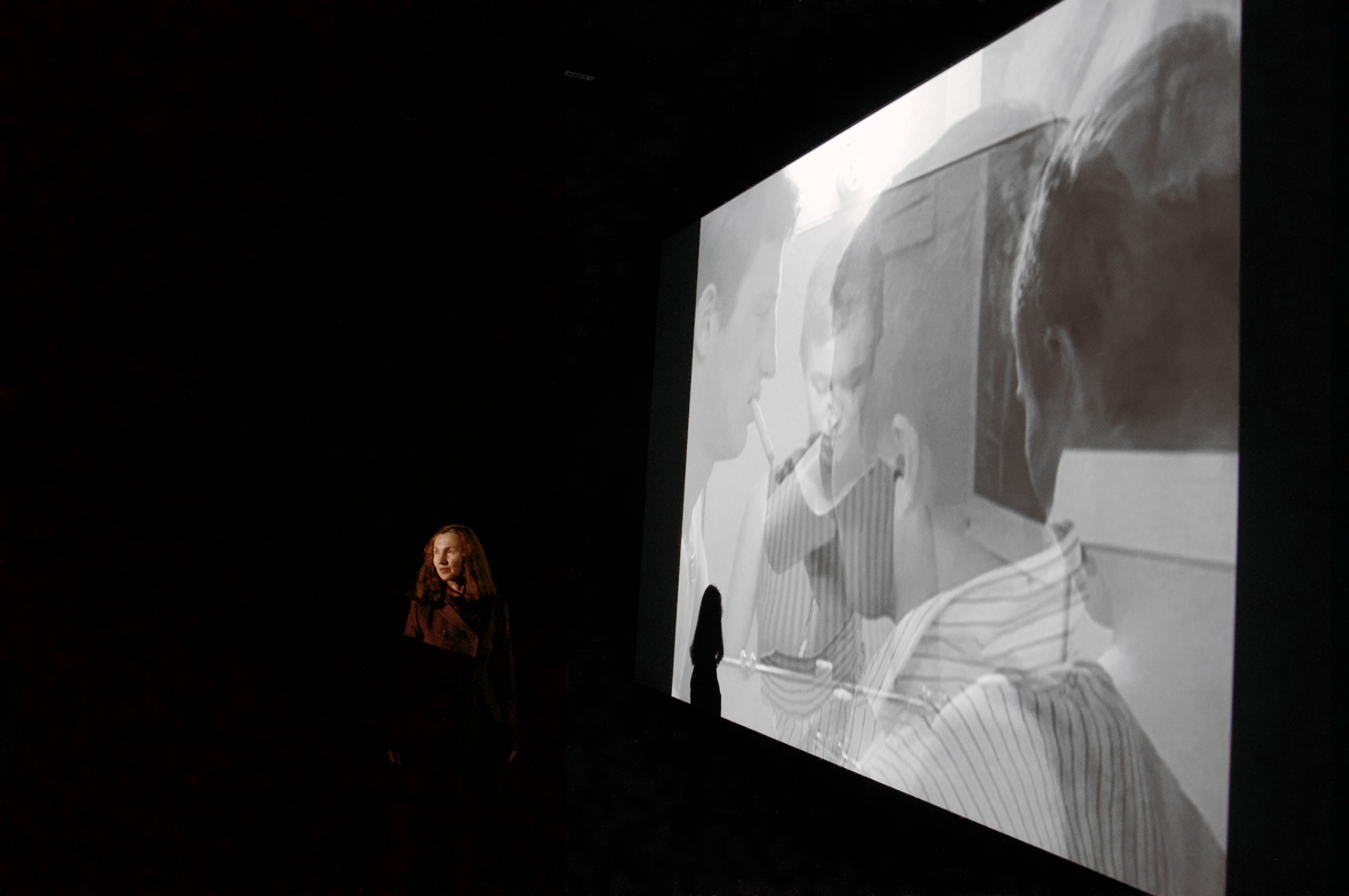
Svetlana Kopystiansky. Exhibition of Fiction Double at the Centre Pompidou. Collection Centre Pompidou MNAM.

In both works the entire movie – respectively, The Birds by Alfred Hitchcock and the Breathless by Jean-Luc Godard – have been played in two directions: forward and backward. Their soundtracks, in contradistinction to Pink and White, were appropriated from the original movies. Both movies were created almost at the same time within only a three-year difference: 1960 Breathless and 1963 The Birds, both have a dramatic intensity and a fictional film narrative built in a classical way: a narrative time moves straightforward in one direction only. Both films represent an “author’s” cinematography and for artists was important to use classical films which every viewer is keeping in a memory. In Double Fiction and Fiction Double respectively, entire film footage of Alfred Hitchcock film The Birds and the entire film footage of Jean-Luc Godard's Breathless are shown with sound, from beginning to end and over again in reverse, from the end to the beginning simultaneously and both flows of time are visible to the viewer in every moment of the presentation. In that new work relations between characters have changed and simultaneously new relations have been built, new interactions between them. Characters also interact with themselves being present at the screen in two times at once. Every next image is an unpredictable visual combination. All the music, all noises and each spoken word in the film always have been played twice: in a regular direction and in a reverse. An important part of these works is a verbal language. The sound has been bound to the image and has been played equally either in a regular direction or reversed. In that second case spoken words have been changed to a not recognition and by loosing their communication means gained new qualities and have been turned into abstract Sounds. In respect to “Double Fiction” art historian John Hanhardt summarizes:

"A work of astonishing simplicity and originality, it takes the meta-cinematic work of such artists as Douglas Gordon and Stan Douglas and the treatment of language in Gary Hill’s videotapes into the complex terrain of narrative, storytelling, and perception. The anticipation and remembrance of time and events through the conventions of storytelling, as we see in The Birds, also becomes a means to provide new insight into that film’s apocryphal vision of nature and human relationships. Early scenes are joined with later scenes, and it is almost as if the film itself is dreaming its own narrative as it unfolds. Birds is a brilliant choice, since it heightens the dramatic intensity of the narrative cinema and the nuance of the performances in a deconstruction of the meanings of the original film. It also places the viewer before the screen as an active participant. In a sense, the film haunts itself, as the action that unfolds anticipates its own conclusion, and the relationships between the characters become tragically predicted and realized. The destruction that is foreshadowed actually appears in the film at its beginning.Igor and Svetlana Kopystiansky have created a dialectical process by integrating the point of view of the camera and the play of time. The viewer becomes engaged in active looking and creates meaning out of moving images through that cognitive process. These artists have created an aesthetic text that is haunted by memory, whether represented by found footage, by the chance recordings of plastic bags blowing along on the sidewalk or the movement of people on the street, or by the rediscovery of scenes from well-known movies. Time erases itself as scenes overlap and change, in the process refashioning the moving image into an aesthetic text of timeless fascination.”

Video installation Crossroad (2009) was exhibited for the first time at the solo exhibition by Igor and Svetlana Kopystiansky in the Musée d'Art Moderne de Saint-Etienne Métropole, France in 2010. An unedited solid footage filmed at six different crossroads in the Lower Manhattan was a record of real time: of all events, which took place in a front of the camera with all sounds of an environment. From these 6 video records artists made 3 video programs using two footages for each screen by superimposing them and dissolving one of them very slowly into another one and back during the playback. In this way during a projection images slowly and gradually dissolve from a shot of one location to a shot of another location in the city. At the beginning of each program is only one single frame which represents a perfect image from one location and immediately after that begins a very long and graduate dissolve which ends up with a single frame of another “perfect image” from a second footage. After reaching that point begins equally slow dissolve back to the first footage again. In the rest of the time on each screen is projected a mixture of two different locations and two time pieces what creates a new fictional visual reality. The architecture becomes entirely unreal and a gradual transition between two different locations creates a dislocation of time and place.

A video work Speak when I have nothing to say, (2009) is represented in the collection of the Henry Art Gallery. To produce this work Igor and Svetlana used the cut as a main editing tool: have edited a scene shared by two characters in Michelangelo Antonioni’s classic Italian film L’Eclisse (1962) played by Monica Vitti and Francisco Rabal. The Kopystianskys have removed the spoken dialogue and deconstructed the narrative of the original by cut and repetition of scenes which repeat and return. By that was created a kind of the surrealist effect, a play of time which recalls the function of the memory. The soundtrack of the video work does consist exclusively from original “sounds” which in the original movie filled a time between dialogues. As a result, in the absence of spoken dialogue bodily gestures and visual imagery become the predominant language evoking a sense of existential solitude, the sense of distance and isolation in a dialogue with Antonioni's original film and author's technique characterized by extended duration.

The six screen video installation Flow exhibited at the Documenta11 (2002) is the work rooted in the ready-made avant-garde tradition by Marcel Duchamp. It might be thought of as a grand synthesis of certain aspects of Incidents and Fog. Like the former, it is concerned with the discarded object of everyday use, but like the latter, the onward course of rivers is also part of its subject. But rather than focusing on a single setting, New York, the work is also synthetic in the sense that it combines various locales into a single imaginative realm. In opinion of Kai-Uwe Hemken “this fundamental significance in the video installation Flow could also apply to exhibition context of the work i.e., Documenta11 as a whole. The work shows that objects and actions have multiple codes, which can always change further in their content. The different meanings of an object are independent of our opinions and values, with which we attribute an object as a reflection of our entire culture.”

In 2004 the SMoCA Scottsdale Museum of Contemporary Art, Arizona commissioned Igor and Svetlana a video work. For the main work of the project artists decided to film a set with the road in the Arizona desert which does look the most ordinary and “timeless.” It is possible that this site did look exactly in the same way many years ago and could be seen in the same shape by people who moved across this land then.

For the two screen video projection installation entitled Establishing Shot (2004) both channels were shot by the same camera on the same tripod and from the same position. At the beginning of the program projected at the left screen, the camera moves from left to right and back again. At the same time at the right screen it moves from right to left and back. In this way by approaching the middle of the program the pictured slices of the panorama grow nearer each other until they eventually reflect what does look like an identical image in the very middle of the program. After that at both screens begins the reverse movement which finally results in a return to initial views of the panorama which are opposite to each other. A title Establishing Shot does refer to an establishing shot in filmmaking, what is a shot that sets up, or establishes, the context for a scene. It is generally a long or extreme-long shot at the beginning of a scene indicating where, and sometimes when, the remainder of the scene takes place.

Both projections seem to be photograph-like and look like stills. But the stillness of the image is an illusion and despite the movement seems to be motionless, the time which unstoppably moves ahead and it’s perception become a main actor of the play in viewer’s consciousness. In this way in the work eliding the languages of photograph and film. The work plays with and investigates the nature of the filmic medium itself: film is constituted by a succession of still images, which are the only reality, and their ‘movement’ is a result of a purely mechanical shift between the lens and a source of light of the projection camera. As the film history does consist from movies shot at the black and white and color film, the two screen Establishing Shot (2004) was produced in black and white. The one screen work Establishing Shot (2004) was produced as one screen installation in which both channels in color have been superimposed and the viewer can see the flow of time simultaneously at one screen.

At the SMoCA Scottsdale Museum of Contemporary Art from 1999 is permanently on view Knight Rise skyspace, by James Turrell. As Turrell says, his work provides the opportunity to “look at our own looking.” Establishing Shot by Igor and Svetlana Kopystiansky does offer viewers an opportunity to look in a stillness of the desert at their own perception of the time flow.

The commissioned two screen video projection installation Sandglass. Establishing Shot. (2004), was exhibited at SMoCA (2005) and at the Lisson Gallery London (2006), Kunsthalle Fridericianum Kassel (2006) and Espoo Museum of Modern Art (2007).

=== Site specific works ===
Among notable site specific works by Svetlana is her contribution to Sculpture Projects Münster 1997 curated by Kasper König and Klaus Bussmann. For the part of the project titled Ontology, or Things that Might Have Been Svetlana Kopystiansky made 40 photographs from various selected objects: tools and materials which were used by different artists in a project for production of their artworks. These found objects were captured at certain moment in time and were considered as accomplished sculptural works. Images of each object were printed as black-and-white posters in multiple editions and were distributed around the city at the time when all photographed objects no longer existed in their documented form.

For the part of her project titled Travels and Leaves Behind, Svetlana Kopystiansky made 40 photographs of various objects which were used by construction workers during the restoration of the Westfälisches Landesmuseum in Münster and which were considered as readymade sculptures exposed within museum space and in museum context. Photographs from these objects were installed during the Skulptur Projekte Münster exhibition in rooms of the Westfälisches Landesmuseum and represented a sculptural exhibition which took place in museums’ space in the quite recent past.

Botanical Garden, (1999). As her contribution to the project Double Lives/Double Vides. Interventions at Barcelona Museums Svetlana reopened the Botanical Garden, previously closed for the public. By way of the project the garden was returned to its original function. The entire space of the botanical garden and all activities were considered an artwork. As the garden exists in a process of constant changes, each day the work took a new and different shape.

Svetlana's performance A Play in Seven Acts (1999) was part of the first British biennial of contemporary art, Liverpool Biennial in 1999. The performance took place over a period of seven days in the international reading room of the Liverpool Central Library. Volunteers and friends of the artist were asked to participate as actors. During the performance, the actors were asked to act as if they are normal visitors to the reading room. Actors, wearing their usual street clothes, were present in the reading room every day together with normal library patrons. As a result, in this work two different spaces merged in fact: a space of fiction and a space of reality. While all actions were visible, differences of consciousness were invisible. It was difficult, perhaps impossible to distinguish actors from regular readers and visitors of the library. Each simple gesture, like opening a book, could be seen as a meaningful theatrical action or just as an everyday gesture not worthy a notice. A Play in Seven Acts was recorded by two video cameras for total of 89 hours. Only short fragments of the play were used in producing the film version the various actors and library patrons are seen in the film.

A performance A Play in Two Acts took place over a period of two days in 2003 in the Main Reading Room of the New York Public Library and was organized by the Christine Burgin Gallery in conjunction with the exhibition. The Main Reading Room is located on the third floor in the North Hall of room 315 of New York Public Library at Fifth Avenue and 42nd Street. May 16 – Act 1 (10 AM-6 PM) and May 17 – Act 2 (10 AM-6 PM) Each act lasted the length of one working day at the library. A Play in 2 Acts was recorded by two video cameras for total of 16 hours. Only short fragments of the play were used in producing the film version the various actors and library patrons are seen in the film.

Workers Library was Svetlana's individual contribution for the biennale in Johannesburg curated by Okwui Enwezor in 1997. I terms of artists’ concept the opening hours of the library were extended to 24 hours a day, seven days a week. Another words the library was open all days and nights long without any interruptions. About this project was made an announcement in the South Africa's biggest-selling newspaper Saturday Star. Also in the city were installed many posters with an information about opening hours and location. The library become accessible for people who visited its reading room any time they felt it is necessary for them. In this project was explored a correlation between reality and time, between time and art. The space of the library was considering as a three dimensional installation which exists in a forth dimension: time. Everything what happened during the time of the project in the library become a performance and visitors become also actors who acted in two spaces simultaneously: in a fictional and in a real one.

=== Photography/works on paper ===
Collages from the group of works entitled Shadow of Gravitation are represented in collections of the Metropolitan Museum MFAH, Museum of Fine Arts Houston and Art Institute of Chicago and were exhibited in all these museums as a part of their permanent collections. Beside that the whole series Shadow of Gravitation consisting from about 40 unique works accomplished in 1993 was exhibited in its entirety at the Art Institute of Chicago in 1996. For these works in a period of several years Svetlana was doing photographs of the ground and water surfaces mostly in the Upstate New York and was buying in various museum shops of New York, Paris or Berlin postcards with reproductions of landscape paintings by various artists mainly from XVIII and XIX century. For each collage the landscape with a reproduction from the existing painting was “enlarged” by an addition of a new space below, at the landscapes’ “foreground.” By that from an edition (postcard) was created a unique visual object. Each Collage was made from the postcard with a reproduction of the landscape painting which is a ready-made or a “found object” and from Svetlana's photographic record of the “found situation”. A production method resulted in a play with time when postcards as reproductions from landscape paintings created at least a hundred years ago were combined with photographs made by the artist recently.

== Exhibitions ==
Kopystiansky's individual and collaborative works has been featured in exhibitions in such institutions as the MoMA, Metropolitan Museum in New York City; Centre Pompidou, Paris; Centre Pompidou Metz; Tate Modern, London; Tate Gellery Liverpool; Museo Reina Sofia, Madrid; Smithsonian American Art Museum, Washington, D.C.; Art Institute of Chicago; Museum of Fine Arts, Houston, MFAH Texas; Museum of Contemporary Art, Chicago MCA Chicago; Whitechapel Art Gallery, London; Museum für Moderne Kunst, MMK Frankfurt am Main; Deichtorhallen Hamburg; Kunsthalle zu Kiel; Stedelijk Museum voor Actuele Kunst SMAK Gent; Art Gallery of New South Wales AGNSW, Sydney; Museum of Contemporary Art, Vigo Spain; MUMOK, Vienna; Henry Art Gallery, Seattle. Among others, Igor and Svetlana Kopystiansky had solo exhibitions at the Musée d’Art Moderne de Saint-Etienne, France; Kunsthalle Düsseldorf; Sprengel Museum Hannover; Kunsthalle Fridericianum, Kassel; Martin-Gropius-Bau/Berlinische Galerie; Espoo Museum of Modern Art, Finland; Scottsdale Museum of Contemporary Art SMoCA Arizona; Fine Arts Center UMass, Amherst; GAMeC, Bergamo; Muzeum Sztuki in Łodz, Poland; Lithuanian National Museum in Vilnius, Lithuania.

Svetlana Kopystiansky's individual works and joint works with Igor were shown at important international exhibitions including the 1992 Sydney Biennial, the 1994 Sao Paulo Biennial, the 1995 Istanbul Biennial, 1997 Lyon Biennial, 1997 Johannesburg Biennial Liverpool Biennial, 1997's Skulpture Projekt, Münster. and documenta 11 in 2002,

The first exhibition by Svetlana Kopystiansky in New York City and the US took place from 16 June-16 July 1988 at the Cable Gallery, 611 Broadway, NYC. At that exhibition participated Svetlana Kopystiansky, Brenda Miller and Collier Schorr. Svetlana exhibited her text based paintings including one of her very early works: Landscape, 1982 which at that time was purchased by American collectors and later donated to the MFAH, Museum of Fine Arts, Houston.

Lisson Gallery represented Igor and Svetlana Kopystiansky from 2001 till 2011. A collaboration with the Lisson gallery started in 2000, when being in New York Igor and Svetlana received an invitation to participate in Video Work, exhibition by the Lisson Gallery in Covent Garden, at 9 Kean Street, April 28 - May 26, London which co-insided with the opening of the Tate Modern. At that exhibition Igor and Svetlana presented their video work Fog (2000) filmed from the Chelsea piers across Hudson River. In 2024 Fog (2000) was acquired by the Walker Art Center. In the exhibition Video Work by the Lisson Gallery participated: Francis Alÿs, Pierre Bismuth, Vanessa Beecroft, Mat Collishaw, Ceal Floyer, Douglas Gordon, Rodney Graham, Igor & Svetlana Kopystiansky, Paul McCarthy, Jonathan Monk, Tony Oursler, Simon Patterson, Julião Sarmento, Marijke van Warmerdam, Jane & Louise Wilson.

At the Armory Show New York in 2001 Lisson gallery presented a video program which included Incidents (1996/1997) by Igor and Svetlana Kopystiansky with video works by Rodney Graham, Francis Alÿs, Jane & Louise Wilson, Julião Sarmento, Simon Patterson, Paul McCarthy, Dan Graham und Pierre Bismuth.

A major part of the first solo exhibition by Igor and Svetlana at the Lisson gallery London in 2002 were installation works filmed on streets of New York City including two screen slide projection installation The Day before Tomorrow (1999) which become a part of the Whitney Museum of American Art collection in 2009.

For the first ttime The Day before Tomorrow was exhibited: Chronos & Kairos: die Zeit in der zeitgenössischen Kunst. Curator René Block. Artists including: Joseph Beuys, George Brecht, Marcel Broodhaers, John Cage, Hanne Darboven, Jan Dibbets, Marcel Duchamp, Hans Peter Feldmann, Robert Fillou, Dick Higgins, Allan Kaprow, On Kawara, Joseph Kosuth, Igor and Svetlana Kopystiansky, George Maciunas, Bruce Nauman, Yoko Ono, Nam June Paik, Man Ray, Dieter Rot, Thomas Ruff, Rosemarie Trockel, Ben Vautier, Wolff Vostell, Andy Warhol, Lawrence Weiner, Emmett Williams. 5 Sept.-7 Nov. 1999.

In 2006 at their second Lisson gallery solo exhibition Igor and Svetlana presented video installation Yellow Sound (2005) which from 2009 is represented in the collection of the Smithsonian American Art Museum in Washington, D.C., two video projection installations (Sandglass) Establishing Shot commissioned by the Scottsdale Contemporary Art museum accompanied by a photographic project Fade also created in the desert of Arizona. Exhibition also included Pink and White presented as a multi screen video installation and paintings by Svetlana Kopystiansky: Landscapes and Seascapes shaped by handwritten text appropriated from poems by Samuel Beckett and works on paper.

== Archives ==
- Fonds Igor et Svetlana Kopystiansky. Bibliothèque Kandinsky, Centre Pompidou.

== Honors and awards ==
- 1990 DAAD Artists-in-Berlin Program
- 2000 Käthe Kollwitz Prize.
- 2008 Résidences internationales aux Récollets à Paris

== Public collections ==
- Museum of Modern Art, New York, USA.
- Metropolitan Museum of Art, New York, USA.
- Whitney Museum of American Art New York, USA.
- Art Institute of Chicago, USA.
- MFAH, Museum of Fine Arts, Houston, USA.
- Walker Art Center, Contemporary Art Museum, Minneapolis, USA.
- Smithsonian American Art Museum, Washington D.C., USA.
- Henry Art Gallery in Seattle, USA.
- Centre Pompidou Paris, France.
- Tate Modern, London, UK.
- Museo Nacional Centro de Arte Reina Sofia, Madrid, Spain.
- Art Gallery of New South Wales, Sydney, Australia.
- MUMOK Vienna, Austria
- ZKM Center for Art and Media Karlsruhe, Germany.
- Ludwig Forum for International Art, Aachen, Germany.
- Ludwig Museum for International Art in the Chinese National Museum (NAMOC)
- Berlinische Galerie, Berlin, Germany.
- Museum für Moderne Kunst, Frankfurt am Main, Germany.
- Frac Corsica, France.
- SMoCA, Scottsdale Museum of Contemporary Art, USA.
- MOCAK, Museum of Contemporary Art Krakow, Poland
- Museum of Art, Łódź, Poland
- Tartu Art Museum, Tartu Kunstimuuseum Estonia.
- Center for Contemporary Art Luigi Pecci, Italy.
- ARS AEVI. Museum of contemporary art, Sarajevo, Bosnia and Herzegovina.
- Arter. Vehbi Koç Foundation, Istanbul, Turkey.
- The Lithuanian National Museum of Art. Vilnius, Lithuania.
- Zimmerli Art Museum, Rutgers, The State University of New Jersey, New Brunswick, NJ, USA.

== Publications ==
- "Igor & Svetlana Kopystiansky". The Lithuanian National Museum of Art. 2023. Foreword: Arūnas Gelūnas. Texts by Michel Gauthier, John G. Hanhardt. Quotations from texts about Kopystiansky's by Kai-Uwe Hemken, Philippe-Alain Michaud, Anthony Spira, Adam D. Weinberg.(Lithuanian, English, French) ISBN 9786094261824
- ‘'Kopystiansky: Double Fiction/Fiction Double”. Published on the occasion of the solo exhibition at the Musée d"Art Moderne de Saint-Étienne. 2010. Texts by John G. Hanhardt, Philippe-Alain Michaud. Les Presses du Réel. ISBN 9782840663744
- "Igor & Svetlana Kopystiansky." Published on the occasion of the solo exhibition at the EMMA – Espoo Museum of Modern Art, Helsinki, 2007. Texts by Timo Valjakka, Anthony Spira, Barry Schwabsky, (English, Finnish, Swedish), EMMA – Espoo Museum of Modern Art, Helsinki. ISBN 9789525509007
- “Igor & Svetlana Kopystiansky: The Day before Tomorrow”. Published on the occasion of the solo exhibition at the Kunsthalle Fridericianum, Kassel and Fine Arts Centre of UMass, Amherst, Massachusetts, 2005. With introduction by René Block and Loretta Yarlow and texts by Adam D. Weinberg, Barry Schwabsky, Andreas Bee, Anthony Bond, Kai-Uwe Hemken. (English and German), ISBN 9780929597195
- “Igor & Svetlana Kopystiansky: Tracking Shot.” With texts by Barry Schwabsky, Andreas Bee, Anthony Bond. (English and Spanish), Distrito4, 2004. Madrid, Spain ISBN 9788493342265
- “Svetlana Kopystiansky: Käthe-Kollwitz-Preis 2000.” Akademie der Künste, Berlin. ISBN 3-88331-042-5
- “Svetlana Kopystiansky: El Jardî." With a text by Joseph M. Camarasa. Institut Botànic Barcelona, Institut de Cultura, Double Lives, Barcelona, 1999. ISBN 9788476098196
- “Igor & Svetlana Kopystiansky: Dialog,” Published on the occasion of the solo exhibition at the IFA Galerie Berlin, 1998. Institut für Auslandsbeziehungen Stuttgart/Berlin.
- “Svetlana Kopystiansky: Workers Library.” 2nd Johannesburg Biennale, 1997. ISBN 9783927869127
- “Svetlana Kopystiansky: The Library.” Published on the occasion of the solo exhibition at the Kunsthalle Düsseldorf, Germany. 1994.
- “Igor and Svetlana Kopystiansky” Published on the occasion of the solo exhibition at the Martin-Gropius-Bau Berlin, 1991. DAAD. Curator René Block. Texts by Dan Cameron, Joachim Sartorius, Christine Tacke. ISBN 9783893570317
- “Svetlana Kopystiansky: Shadow of Gravitation,” Published on the occasion of the solo exhibition at The Art Institute of Chicago, 1996. Publisher: Buro Orange Siemens AG Kulturstiftung Siemens. ISBN 3-9805007-1-3
