= DAAD Artists-in-Berlin Program =

Residential program for artists

Coordinates: 52.5074°N 13.3888°E

- Formation: 1963
- Legal status: Residential Artists' Program
- Headquarters: Berlin, Germany
- Region served: Berlin
- Leadership: Silvia Fehrmann
- Website: berliner-kuenstlerprogramm.de

The DAAD Artists-in-Berlin Program (German: Berliner Künstlerprogramm des DAAD) is a residential program for artists of all countries and ages run by the German Academic Exchange Service (German: Deutscher Akademischer Austauschdienst, DAAD) in Berlin. Originally initiated by the Ford Foundation in 1963, the program has been run by the DAAD – with the assistance of the German Federal Foreign Office and the Senate of Berlin – since 1965.

From the website:

Programme description

The Artists-in-Berlin Program sees itself as a platform for artistic and cultural exchange throughout and beyond Europe. Every year, it invites applications from around the world for approximately 20 fellowships, usually funding a one-year stay in Berlin. These fellowships are aimed at extraordinary and internationally established artists from abroad. The Artists-in-Berlin Program is designed to offer its guests space for their creative work, promote the diversity and variety of artistic viewpoints, and strengthen the freedom of the arts and the written and spoken word. Fellowship holders therefore have every freedom to develop their approach, to work on their art, and to interact with fellow artists.

Target group

Internationally established and outstanding artists from abroad who would like to come to Berlin in order to work on their art and interact with fellow artists. Age is irrelevant.

== History of the Artists-in-Berlin Program ==
In 1963, a year and a half after the construction of the Berlin Wall, the Ford Foundation created a three-year program aimed at expanding and strengthening the cultural and educational resources of West Berlin. The Foundation made an initial donation of three million US dollars and placed James B. Conant, former president of Harvard University and former United States Ambassador to Germany, in charge. 300,000 and 350,000 dollars respectively were allocated to the creation of two new courses at the Free University of Berlin – one in American Studies, and another in Comparative Music Studies. 590,000 dollars were used to make it possible for 'artists, writers, academics, scientists and composers' to spend 'an extended period of time living and working in Berlin.' In 1965 the DAAD took over the running of the program, and renamed it the Artists-in-Berlin Program. It now gained additional support from the German Federal Foreign Office and the Senate of Berlin. Hansgerd Schulte, president of the DAAD from 1972 to 1987, called it 'the jewel in the crown' – a unique entity amongst the many programs run by the DAAD. In 2013, the program is preparing to celebrate its 50th anniversary. This will be marked by a two-day celebration hosted at the Berlin Academy of Art, featuring performances from Antjie Krog, Sjòn, Jennifer Walshe and Phil Collins, among others. A 50th anniversary countdown blog has also been created, featuring contributions from various guests about their time in Berlin.

== Guests ==
In essence, the Artists-in-Berlin Program consists of a grant, allowing an artist to spend one year in Berlin. Each year, following the recommendations of a jury, the program awards around 20 grants in the fields of the visual arts, film, literature and music. The program also assists its guests with displaying or performing the work they have produced in Berlin –for visual artists, for instance, individual exhibitions are organized in the program's gallery, the daadgalerie, often accompanied by a publication. From 1964 until October 2008, around 1000 artists had come to Berlin as guests of the program. Between 1963 and 2013, around 394 visual artists took part in the program. They include Jorge Castillo (1969), Daniel Spoerri (1973), Joel Fisher (1973), Gunter Christmann (1974), Richard Hamilton (1974), Duane Hanson (1974), Christian Boltanski (1975), Lawrence Weiner (1975), On Kawara (1976), Jannis Kounellis (1980), Nam June Paik (1983), Jerry Ross Barrish (1986), Erwin Wurm (1987), Ilya Kabakov (1989), Igor Kopystiansky (1990), Svetlana Kopystiansky (1990), Nan Goldin (1991), Marina Abramović (1992), Rachel Whiteread (1992), Damien Hirst (1993), Andrea Zittel (1995), Pipilotti Rist (1996), Douglas Gordon (1997), Allan Sekula (1997), Rineke Dijkstra (1998), Steve McQueen (1999), Mark Wallinger (2001), Mona Hatoum (2003), Helen Mirra (2005), Shahzia Sikander (2007), Tim Lee (2009), Brandt Junceau (2010), and AA Bronson (2013). Due to the extremely high demand for grants in this field, the program no longer takes on applications from individual artists – they must instead be sought out and suggested by a committee. In all other fields, potential guests are welcome to apply on their own initiative.

The program has also hosted 334 writers. They include Ingeborg Bachmann (1963), W. H. Auden (1964), Peter Handke (1968), Ernst Jandl (1970), George Tabori (1971), Lars Gustafsson (1972), Friederike Mayröcker (1973), Stanisław Lem (1977), Gyorgy Konrad (1977), Margaret Atwood (1984), Gao Xingjian (1985), László Krasznahorkai (1987), Carlos Fuentes (1988) Susan Sontag (1989), Cees Nooteboom (1989), Antonio Lobo Antunes (1989), Michael Rosenzweig (1990), Harold Brodkey (1992), Vladimir Sorokin (1992), Imre Kertész (1993), Ryszard Kapuscinski (1994), Richard Ford (1997), Jeffery Eugenides (1999), Laszlo Vegel (2006), Svetlana Alexievich (2011), Liao Yiwu (2012), Erik Lindner (2012), and Lance Olsen (2015). Around 282 composers have received a program grant for music. They include Iannis Xenakis (1963), Igor Stravinsky (1964), Isang Yun (1964), Krzysztof Penderecki (1968), György Ligeti (1969), Morton Feldman (1971), John Cage (1972), Arvo Pärt (1981), Luigi Nono (1986), Michael Rosenzweig (1990), La Monte Young (1992), Peter Machajdík (1992), Roberto Paci Dalò (1993), Nicolas Collins (1995), Olga Neuwirth (1996) and Giulio Castagnoli (1998). 105 filmmakers, such as Yvonne Rainer (1976), Istvan Szabo (1977), Andrei Tarkovsky (1985), Jim Jarmusch (1987), Alina Rudnizkaia (2011), Sebastián Lelio (2012) and Xiaolu Guo (2012) have also participated in the program. The first grant for dance and performance was awarded in 1989, and the program has since welcomed 13 such artists, including Wendy Perron (1992).

== The daadgalerie ==
From the very beginning, the Artists-in-Berlin Program was intended to provide more than just funding and accommodation. Its mission was to connect isolated West Berlin with a wider cultural and creative world. As such, the program coordinators invited guest artists to city events, introduced them to influential figures in the German cultural scene, and ensured that they were able to publicly perform and display their work. To give these activities a concrete physical focus, the daadgalerie was created in 1978, providing the program's artists with a set platform for their creative activities. To begin with, it was based in silent film star Henny Porten's former villa in the Kurfürstenstraße, in what was then West Berlin. However, in 2005 it was moved to new premises in the Zimmerstraße, close to Checkpoint Charlie in the centre of Berlin. It continues to host a wide range of events, including readings, concerts, film showings and performances.
