= Helen Mirra =

American artist

Hendl Helen Mirra
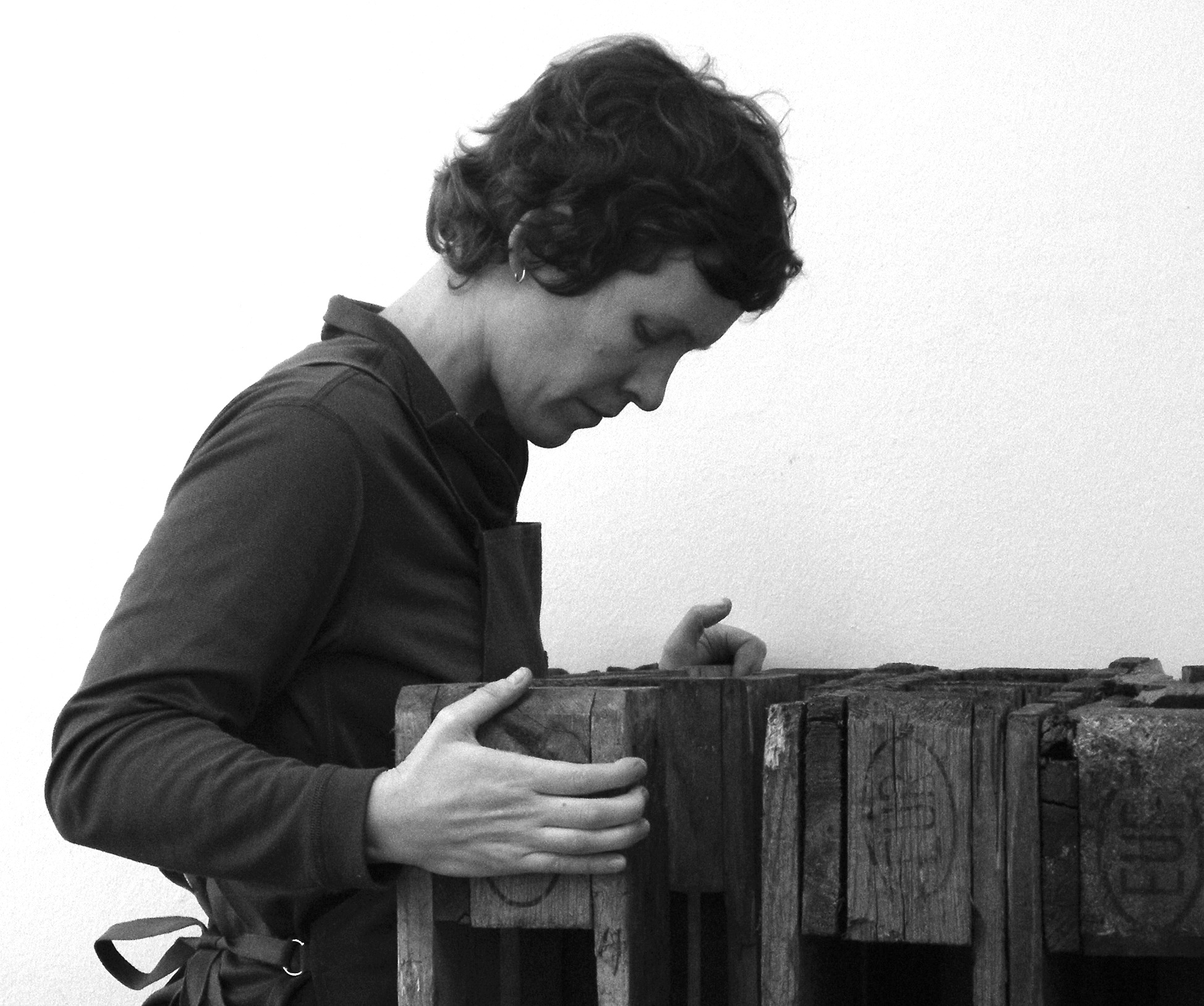
- Born: December 31, 1970; Rochester New York
- Education: Bennington College, University of Illinois at Chicago

Hendl Helen Mirra is an American conceptual artist. "[Like Henry David Thoreau, she is a] maximalist in a minimalist robe", with an idiosyncratic practice. She is engaged with ideas common to buddhist and pragmatist philosophies, and since 2008 her art practice has been integrated with walking. She has said of walking: "It is an unskilled activity, and a modest activity, and a free activity, and an always-available activity, and an equipment-free activity, and an active activity." In an essay on Mirra's work, Yukio Lippit described her engagement thus: "Mirra’s practice champions walking as a specific form of thinking that bypasses language. Indeed, one senses that she shares with Zen Buddhists in particular a deep skepticism towards language as an authentic mechanism of discovery." At the same time, she has often worked with language as a primary material.

== Career ==
Hendl Mirra has worked in diverse media including weaving, writing - particularly indexes, experimental music, sculpture, 16mm film, and video. "Environmental belonging" has been a persistent theme, while keeping within a restricted palette. Her first one-person institutional exhibition, Sky-wreck, at the Renaissance Society at the University of Chicago in 2001, was an indigo-dyed textile sculpture of a section of the sky, imagined as part of a geodesic structure. In addition to John Cage, Stanley Brouwn, André Cadere, and Douglas Huebler are key influences.

She has an exhibition history in North and South America, Europe, and Japan, and participated in broad international exhibitions such as the 11th Havana Bienal, the 30th São Paulo Art Biennial and the 50th Venice Biennial. A fifteen-year (1995-2009) survey of her work, Edge Habitat, was presented in 2014 at Culturgest in Lisbon, Portugal, and the corresponding publication Edge Habitat Materials was published by Whitewalls.

She was a Senior Lecturer in Visual Art and Cinema & Media Studies at the University of Chicago (2001-2005) and a Loeb Associate Professor of the Humanities in the department of Visual and Environmental Studies at Harvard University until 2013. She has been an artist-in-residence at University of California at Berkeley, and a guest of the DAAD Artists-in-Berlin Program. She lives in Northern California.

== Selected solo exhibitions ==
- Sky-wreck, Renaissance Society, 2001
- Declining Interval Lands, Whitney Museum of American Art, 2002
- 65 Instants, MATRIX 209, Berkeley Art Museum, 2003
- Gehend, Bonner Kunstverein, KW Institute of Contemporary Art Berlin, and Haus Kontruktiv, Zurich, 2011-2012
- Hourly Directional with Ernst Karel, MIT List Center, 2014
- Hourly Directional, Radcliffe Institute for Advanced Study, 2014
- Edge Habitat, Culturgest, Lisbon Portugal, 2014
- Waulked, Peter Freeman Inc., New York, 2014
- Helen Mirra, Galerie Nordenhake, Stockholm, 2015
- *, Galerie Nordenhake, Stockholm, 2018
- la malplena ĉambro estas bela, Large Glass, London, 2020
