= Musée d'art moderne (Saint-Étienne) =

Musée d'art moderne et contemporain, Saint-Étienne Métropole
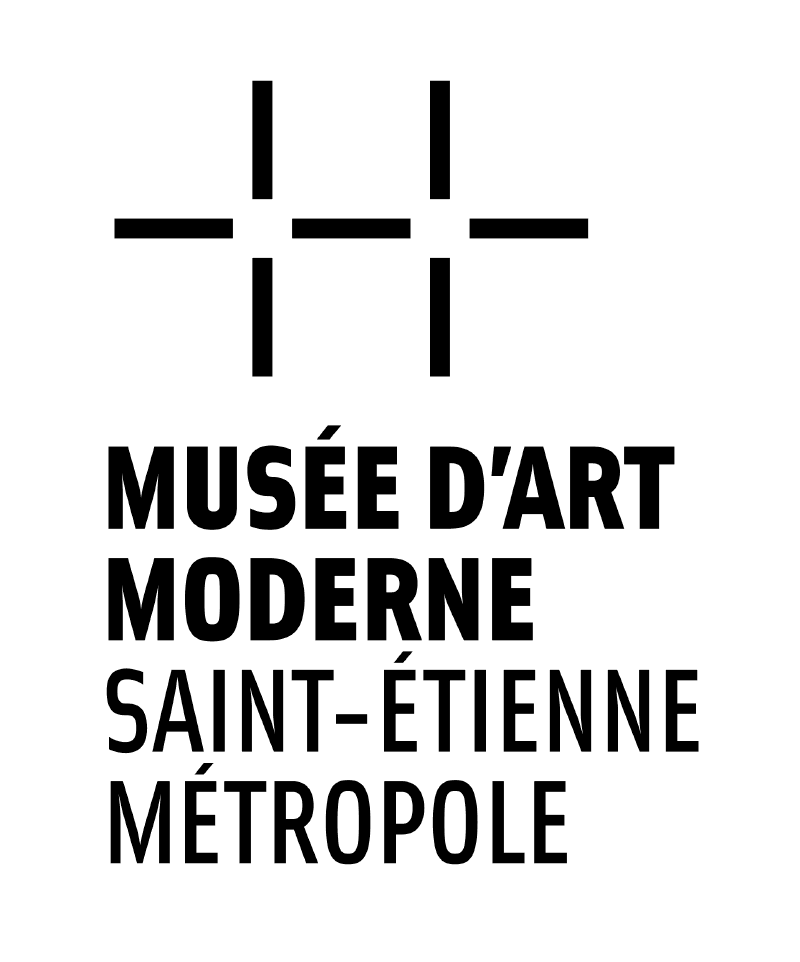

- Location within France
- Established: 10 December 1987
- Location: Saint-Étienne, Rhône-Alpes, France
- Coordinates: 45.469536°N 4.373953°E
- Type: Modern and contemporary art museum
- Website: www.mam-st-etienne.fr

The Musée d'art moderne et contemporain (Museum of Modern and Contemporary Art), or MAMC, is an art museum in Saint-Étienne, Auvergne-Rhône-Alpes, France. It was inaugurated as a separate museum in 1987. It has one of the largest collections of its type in France.

== Museum ==
The Musée d'art moderne was originally a section of the Musée d'art et d'industrie. It was inaugurated as a separate museum on 10 December 1987, within a renovated museum complex that also includes the Musée de la mine (Mining Museum) and the Musée d'art et d'industrie (Art and Industry Museum). The museum has about 3,000 square metres (32,000 sq ft) of display space. Ten rooms display samples of the museum's collection and fourteen are used for temporary exhibitions on a given theme or major artist. The museum has a restaurant that is open at midday.

== Collection ==
The collection, which was started in 1947, is one of the most important of its type in France. The museum now has more than 19,000 works, mostly from the 20th century but including some ancient art. The collection includes work by Claude Monet, Alberto Magnelli, Pablo Picasso, Victor Brauner and Fernand Léger. It includes iconic pieces and series by artists such as Art & Language, Jean Dubuffet, Pierre Soulages and Raoul Hausmann. It also includes collections such as German art of the 1980s, minimalism, American abstraction, conceptual art and design. Temporary exhibitions have included the works of Gilbert & George, Georg Baselitz, Antony Gormley, Sean Scully and Mario Schifano. The best-known works are not always present, since about 600 works are loaned to other museums around the world each year.

== Sources ==
- Auzias, Dominique; Labourdette, Jean-Paul (2014-06-12). Les plus beaux musées de France 2014 Petit Futé (avec photos et avis des lecteurs). Petit Futé. ISBN 978-2-7469-7591-0.
- "Musée" (in French). MAMC.
- "Musée d'art moderne et contemporain de Saint-Étienne Métropole" (in French). Saint-Etienne Métropole.
