= Strike MoMA =

Museum protest in New York (state)

Strike MoMA is a movement to strike the Museum of Modern Art in New York City, targeting what its organizers describe as the "toxic philanthropy" of the museum's leadership. It has consisted of a series of 10 demonstrations organized over ten weeks, from April 9, 2021, through June 11.

== History ==
The movement, led by a collective calling itself the International Imagination of Anti-National Anti-Imperialist Feelings (IIAAF), grew as an escalation of pressure against the institution following reports that MoMA chairman Leon Black had paid the convicted sex offender Jeffrey Epstein charged with sex trafficking $158 million. A successful open letter campaign endorsed by over 150 artists led to his resignation as chairman of the museum, although questions remained as to how his role at the museum would continue.

Michael Rakowitz, one of the signing artists, noted that "MoMA has refused comment on every story that has emerged about Leon Black." He continued, "The museum stays silent while we as artists are asked to speak. Beyond speaking, I look forward to collectively imagining an ecosystem that does not enlist our content to go on display in institutions whose board members create the very conditions in the world that many of us are devoted to dismantling.” The museum's director, Glenn D. Lowry, whose contract Black had extended through 2025, has also been identified as conspicuously silent on the subject.

In a statement on March 23, the IIAAF collective announced a 10-week strike against the MoMA starting April 9.

On April 30, activists planning to demonstrate inside the museum were denied entry. Among the organizers was Amin Husain of Decolonize This Place, who had previously organized protests against the Whitney Museum of American Art that led to the resignation of the vice-chairman Warren Kanders whose company Safariland produces tear gas grenades used on protesters.

On May 26, 2021, the Times of Israel reported that activists associated with the movement accused board members of the MoMA—Ron Lauder, Leon Black, and Steven Tananbaum—of "supporting apartheid rule" and "artwashing" the "occupation of Palestine".
