= Amin Husain =

American activist and professor

- Education: B.A. in Philosophy and Political Science from Valparaiso University, J.D. from Indiana University School of Law, LL.M. from Columbia Law School
- Occupations: Activist, academic
- Organization(s): Decolonize This Place, MTL+

Amin Husain is a Palestinian-American activist and adjunct professor at New York University. As of January 2024, he has been suspended from that position.

== Academic career ==
Husain has a B.A. in philosophy and political science from Valparaiso University in 1998, a J.D. from Indiana University School of Law in 2001, and an LL.M. from Columbia Law School in 2004. He joined the New York University faculty as a part-time adjunct professor in 2016. His academic work focuses on resistance and liberation and postcolonial theory. Prior to NYU, he taught at The New School, before leaving in 2019. In January 2024, Husain was suspended as an adjunct professor at NYU after denying sexual and gender-based violence in the 7 October attack on Israel, and describing New York as a "Zionist city" at a Students for Justice in Palestine rally.

== Activism ==
Amin Husain is a founding member of Global Ultra Luxury Faction; founding member and managing editor of the magazine Tidal: Occupy Theory, Occupy Strategy; founding member of the collective MTL; and founding member of NYC Solidarity with Palestine. He has directed and produced an experimental documentary film about Palestinian Territories titled, On This Land. He is a supporter of New York City Students for Justice in Palestine and is an active supporter of the Boycott, Sanctions and Divestment (BDS) movement, emphasizing the cultural and academic boycott of Israel.

As of 2017, Husain was the lead organizer of Decolonize This Place whose organization is founded on five main issues: Free Palestine, Indigenous Struggle, Black Liberation, Global Wage Workers, and de-gentrification. He was also co-founder of the MTL+ Collective. In 2018–2019, Husain led (via Decolonize) the weekly protest at the Whitney Museum in New York, called the "Nine Weeks of Art and Action" to protest Warren Kanders' position as the vice-chair of Whitney's board. At the end of the protest on May 17, 2019, the protestors walked to Kanders' home.
