= Whitney Biennial =

Contemporary art exhibition in New York City

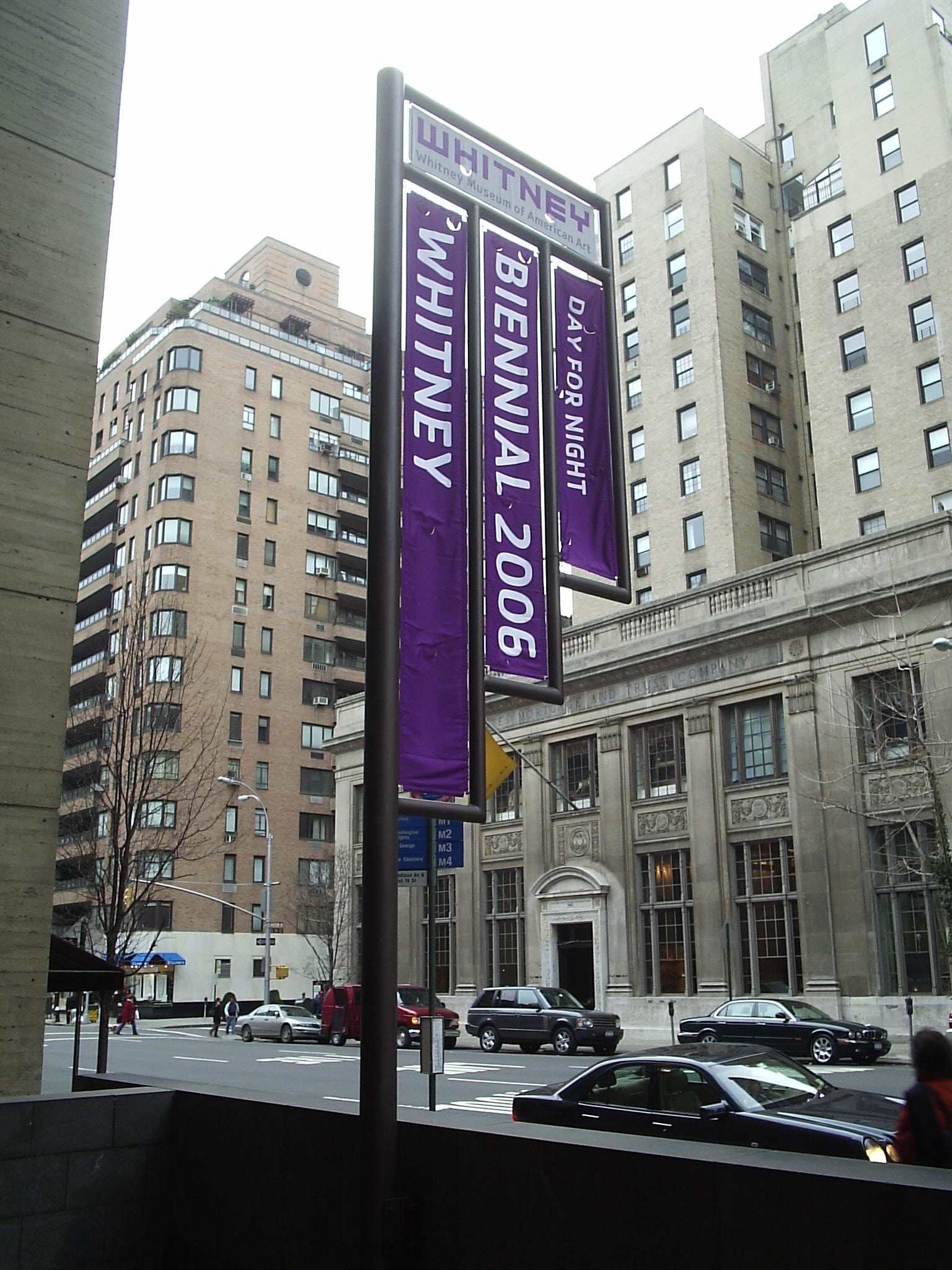
- The banner of the 2006 Whitney Biennial: Day For Night in front of the Whitney Museum
- Frequency: Biennial
- Organiser: Whitney Museum of American Art

The Whitney Biennial is a biennial exhibition of contemporary American art organized by the Whitney Museum of American Art in New York City. The exhibition series began in 1932, running first as biennials and then, from 1937, as annuals; the current biennial format was established in 1973. It is widely considered as the most important survey exhibition of contemporary art in the United States. The Biennial helped bring artists including Georgia O'Keeffe, Jackson Pollock, and Jeff Koons, among others, to prominence.

== Artists ==
In 2010, for the first time a majority of the 55 artists included in that survey of contemporary American art were women. The 2012 exhibition featured 51 artists, the smallest number in the event's history.

The fifty-one artists for 2012 were selected by curator Elisabeth Sussman and freelance curator Jay Sanders. It was open for three months up to May 27, 2012 and presented for the first time "heavy weight" on dance, music and theater. Those performance art variations were open to spectators for an entire day on a separate floor.

== History ==
Beginning in 1932, the Whitney Museum launched a series of large group exhibitions of invited American artists, structured initially as biennials running on two parallel cycles that alternated by medium: painting in even years (1932, 1934, 1936) and sculpture, watercolors, and prints in odd years (1933, 1935). In 1937, the museum reformatted the series as annuals, typically holding painting exhibitions in the fall and sculpture and related media in the spring. The first combined "Annual Exhibition of Contemporary American Art" was held in 1940, though the format varied over the next few years, with the last combined annual taking place in 1943–44. From then until 1973, the annuals alternated between painting and sculpture. In 1973, the museum returned to a biennial format, this time as a single all-media exhibition held every other year, which has continued to the present.

In the past the Whitney Museum has tried different ways to organize its biennial. It has used its own staff members and invited outside curators including Europeans, to present the show. In 2010 it even asked a former art dealer, Jay Sanders, who later became a Whitney curator, to help organize one. The Whitney Biennial often extends to sculpture exhibitions in Central Park. The 2008 edition took over the Park Avenue Armory as a space for performance and installation art. The 2014 Whitney Biennial is the last one in the museum's Marcel Breuer building. The museum left the Upper East Side for the meatpacking district, where it opened its new building, designed by Renzo Piano, in 2015. In 1987, the show was protested by the Guerrilla Girls for its alleged sexism and racism.

Still referred to as the "political" biennial, the 1993 edition had works like Pepón Osorio's installation Scene of the Crime (Whose Crime?) of a Hispanic family's living room and Daniel Joseph Martinez's metal buttons bearing the message "I can't imagine ever wanting to be white." The 1993 Whitney Biennial was the most diverse exhibit by a major American museum up until that time. In 1970 less than 1% of artists at the Whitney Museum were non-white. In 1991, only 10% of artists were non white. Vanessa Faye Johnson said that despite intentions, the "lack of exchange and dialogue, the simplification of complex issues in the Biennial" effectively cast the artists largely as victims in the eyes of the public. Roberta Smith, an art critic for The New York Times, called it "pious, [and] often arid". The art historian Robert Hughes vehemently criticized lack of painting, and the "wretched pictorial ineptitude" of the artists, dismissed the abundance of text as "useless, boring mock documentation", and mocked the focus on "exclusion and marginalization... [in] a world made bad for blacks, Latinos, gays, lesbians, and women in general." The largely shared sentiment was that the public felt alienated by the confrontational demands of the artwork. Laura Cottingham, writing for Frieze, noted that it was the first Whitney Biennial to treat video works with the same attention to space as sculpture, designating two entire galleries to them. She highlighted that text-heavy installations demanded attention and participation and that the artists made it difficult to take in the work as a passive viewer.

Since 2000, the Bucksbaum Award has been awarded to an artist exhibiting at the Biennial. The 2014 Whitney Biennial was also somewhat controversial for its lack of diversity, nine of the 109 artists were black or African American including Donelle Woolford, a fictional character developed by 52-year-old white artist Joe Scanlan. She was the only black female artist included in curator Michelle Grabner's exhibition. Eunsong Kim and Maya Isabella Mackrandilal criticized the piece, "The insertion of people of color into white space doesn't make it less colonial or more radical—that's the rhetoric of imperialistic multiculturalism, a bullshit passé theory." and suggest the pieces treat "othered bodies [as] subcontractable."

Additionally, The YAMS Collective, or HOWDOYOUSAYYAMINAFRICAN?, a collective of 38 mostly black and queer artists, writers, composers, academics, filmmakers and performers participated and withdrew from the 2014 Biennial as a protest of the Whitney Museum's policies. Yams Collective member and artist Sienna Shields said, "Every Whitney Biennial I have ever been to, you can barely count the number of black artists in the show on one hand. I didn't want to be a part of that," Shields said. "There are so many amazing artists of color that I have known in the past 12 years in New York that are essentially overlooked. But I just felt it was time for an intervention." Poet Christa Bell explained: "[O]ur entire participation was a protest... Just because people don't know that doesn't mean it is any less of a protest. Withdrawal was the final act of protest. Black people en masse being inside of an institution like the Whitney, presenting art, is itself a form of protest. We just followed it through to its inevitable conclusion." The 2017 Whitney Biennial featured a controversial painting of Emmett Till, entitled Open Casket by Dana Schutz, which sparked protest and a highly circulated petition calling for the painting to be removed and destroyed.

The 2019 Whitney Biennial was boycotted by a group of artists, in protest of the museum's vice chairman, Warren Kanders. Kanders' companies sell military supplies (teargas and bullets) via Safariland. The bullets were used by Israeli forces and snipers during the 2018–2019 Gaza border protests. The United Nations released a report saying that Israeli security forces may have committed war crimes and should be held individually and collectively accountable for the deaths of 189 Palestinian protesters in Gaza. As such, the 2019 Whitney Biennial was labeled "The Tear Gas Biennial" by Hannah Black, Ciarán Finlayson, and Tobi Haslett in an open letter on Artforum. The artists who withdrew from include Korakrit Arunanondchai, Meriem Bennani, Nicole Eisenman, Nicholas Galanin, Eddie Arroyo, Christine Sun Kim, Agustina Woodgate, and Forensic Architecture. The Forensic Architecture biennial submission, "Triple-Chaser" (2019), collected evidence, ammunition rounds, and eyewitness testimony which links Warren Kanders to the killings and maiming of Palestinians. It is a collaboration with documentary filmmaker Laura Poitras.

== See also ==
- List of Whitney Biennial artists
- List of Whitney Biennial curators
- 2022 Whitney Biennial
- 2024 Whitney Biennial
- 2026 Whitney Biennial
- Visual arts of the United States
- The Catalog Committee
