= Sreshta Premnath =

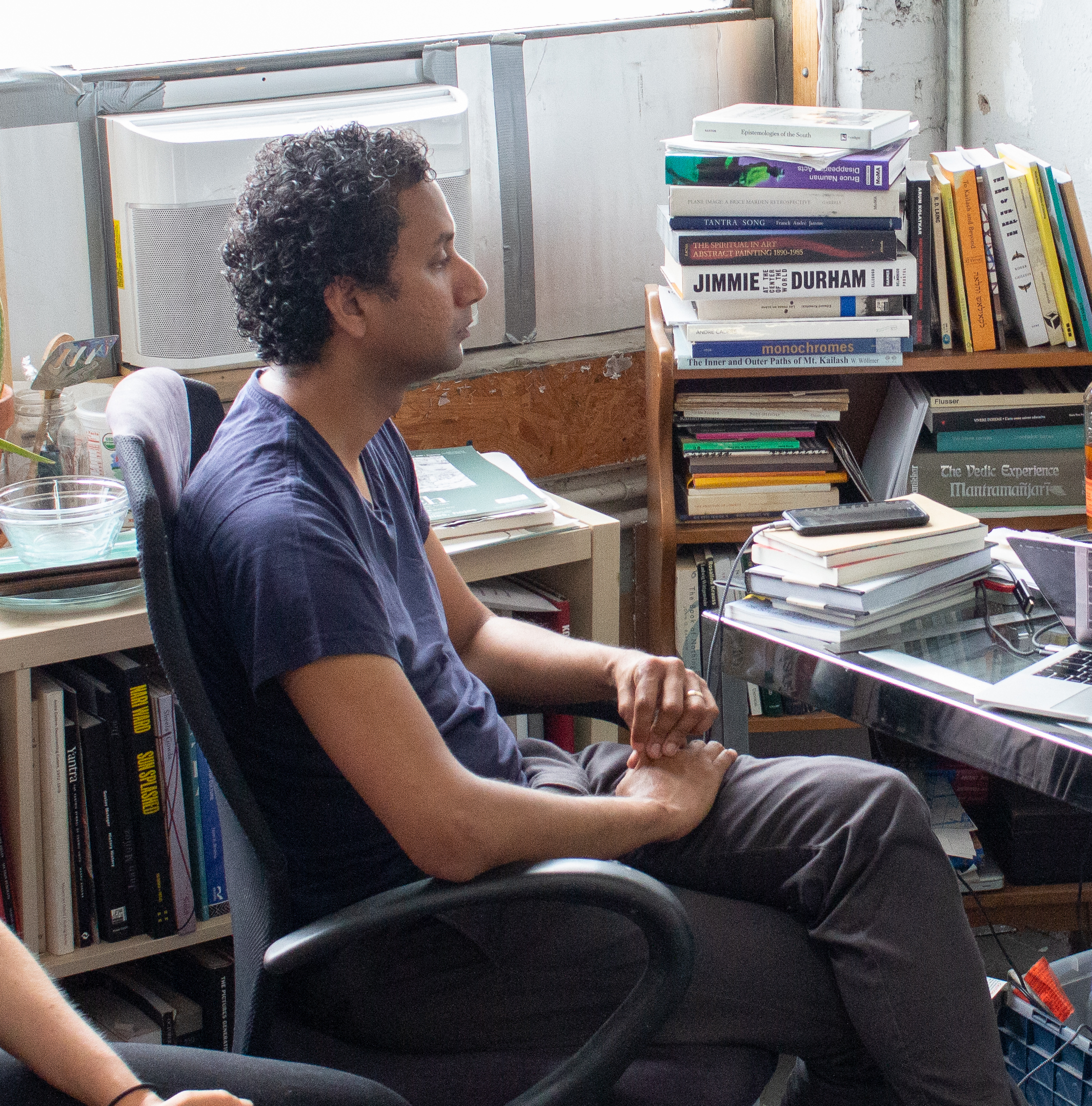
- Premnath in 2019
- Born: Sreshta Premnath; 1979 (age 46–47); Bangalore, Karnataka, India
- Education: Cleveland Institute of Art, Bard College Milton Avery Graduate School of the Arts, Whitney Museum of American Art’s Independent Study Program
- Notable work: Devi Art Foundation, New Delhi; Fondazione Memmo, Rome; Nomas Foundation, Rome; Zabludowicz Collection, London.
- Awards: Art Matters Foundation Award, Civitella Ranieri Foundation Fellowship, Edward and Sally Van Lier Fund of the New York Community Trust, Arthur Levitt Jr. ’52 Fellowship Williams College
- Website: http://sreshtaritpremnath.com/

Sreshta Rit Premnath (born 1979) is an artist living in New York City whose work incorporates multiple media. He is the founding editor of Shifter, a platform that convenes public discussions and produces topical publications at the intersection of art and theory. He is Associate Professor of Art at Williams College.

== Selected exhibitions ==
Grave/Grove Premnath's solo exhibition at Institute of Contemporary Art, San Diego. Curated by Amara Antilla and Natalie Bell in 2021, and organized by Guusje Sanders at ICA San Diego, the exhibition contains object installations.

Grave/Grove Premnath's solo exhibition at Contemporary Art Center, Cincinnati. Curated by Amara Antilla and Natalie Bell in 2021, the exhibition contains object installations.

Grave/Grove Premnath's solo exhibition at MIT List Visual Arts Center, Cambridge. Curated by Amara Antilla and Natalie Bell in 2021, the exhibition contains object installations.

The Protest and the Recuperation exhibition at the Wallach Art Gallery, Columbia University, NYC. Curated by Betti-Sue Hertz, this group exhibition explores global artistic responses to mass protests as well as strategies of recuperation.

Those Who Wait Premnath's solo exhibition at Contemporary Art Gallery, Vancouver. Curated by Kimberly Phillips in 2019, the exhibition contains object installations and was accompanied by a monograph.

Cadere/Rose Premnath's solo exhibition at Nomas Foundation, in Rome Italy. Curated by Maria Rosa Sossai in 2017, the exhibition contains large monograph vinyl wall prints, object installations, and a video.

Folding Rulers at Contemporary Art Museum (CAM) St Louis, USA. This solo exhibition, curated by Kelly Schindler in 2012, is a full room installation with wall banners and objects visualizing representations of power.

After Midnight: Indian Modernism to Contemporary Art exhibition at the Queens Museum, NYC. Curated by Arshiya Lokhandwala, this group exhibition explores themes of art and nation-building in a newly globalized contemporary art world.
