= The Catalog Committee =

American arts group

The Catalog Committee, or The Catalog Committee of Artists Meeting for Cultural Change (AMCC), was a group formed in 1975 to protest against the Whitney Museum of American Art's bicentennial exhibition. The Committee consisted of fifteen artists and two art historians.

== History ==
In 1975, the Whitney Museum of American Art's bicentennial exhibition decided to feature a collection by John D. Rockefeller called Three Centuries of American Art. The collection, which showed mainly eighteenth and nineteenth century art, was heavily criticized for featuring only one African American, one woman artist, and no Hispanic or native American artists. A group called Artists Meeting for Cultural Change (AMCC) published an open letter "to the American Art Community" on December 14, 1975 in response to the Whitney Museum's decision. In the letter, the AMCC referred to Rockefeller's exhibition as "a blatant example of a large cultural institution writing the history of American art as though the last decade of cultural and social reassessment had never taken place." After ultimately being disregarded by the Whitney Museum's director Tom Armstrong, the group continued protesting and considered different actions.

In the open letter, the AMCC spoke of alternative strategies: "picketing to coincide with key American history holidays, alternative street exhibitions and an alternative catalogue, a slide show for educational purposes and letters to Congresspersons."

One of their alternative strategies, "an alternative catalogue," was eventually created and published under the title An Anti-Catalog.

=== An Anti-Catalog ===
An Anti-Catalog is a book written and published by the Catalog Committee of AMCC in 1977. Originally meant to criticize Rockefeller's work, An Anti-Catalog became a collection of articles and documents that encompassed African-American art, native American art, art by women, and multiple critiques on cultural institutions. The eighty-page book took almost a year to make and was a product of collective work and determination by fifteen artists and two art historians from the AMCC.

==== Contributors ====
- Rudolf Baranik
- Sarina Bromberg
- Sarah Charlesworth
- Susanne Cohn
- Carol Duncan
- Shawn Gargagliano
- Eunice Golden
- Janet Koenig
- Joseph Kosuth
- Anthony McCall
- Paul Pechter
- Elaine Bendock Pelosini
- Aaron Roseman
- Larry Rosing
- Ann Marie Rousseau
- Alan Wallach
- Walter Weissman
- Jimmie Durham

== See also ==
- Harlem on My Mind protest
- Women Artists Visibility Event
