= Juliana Force =

American museum director

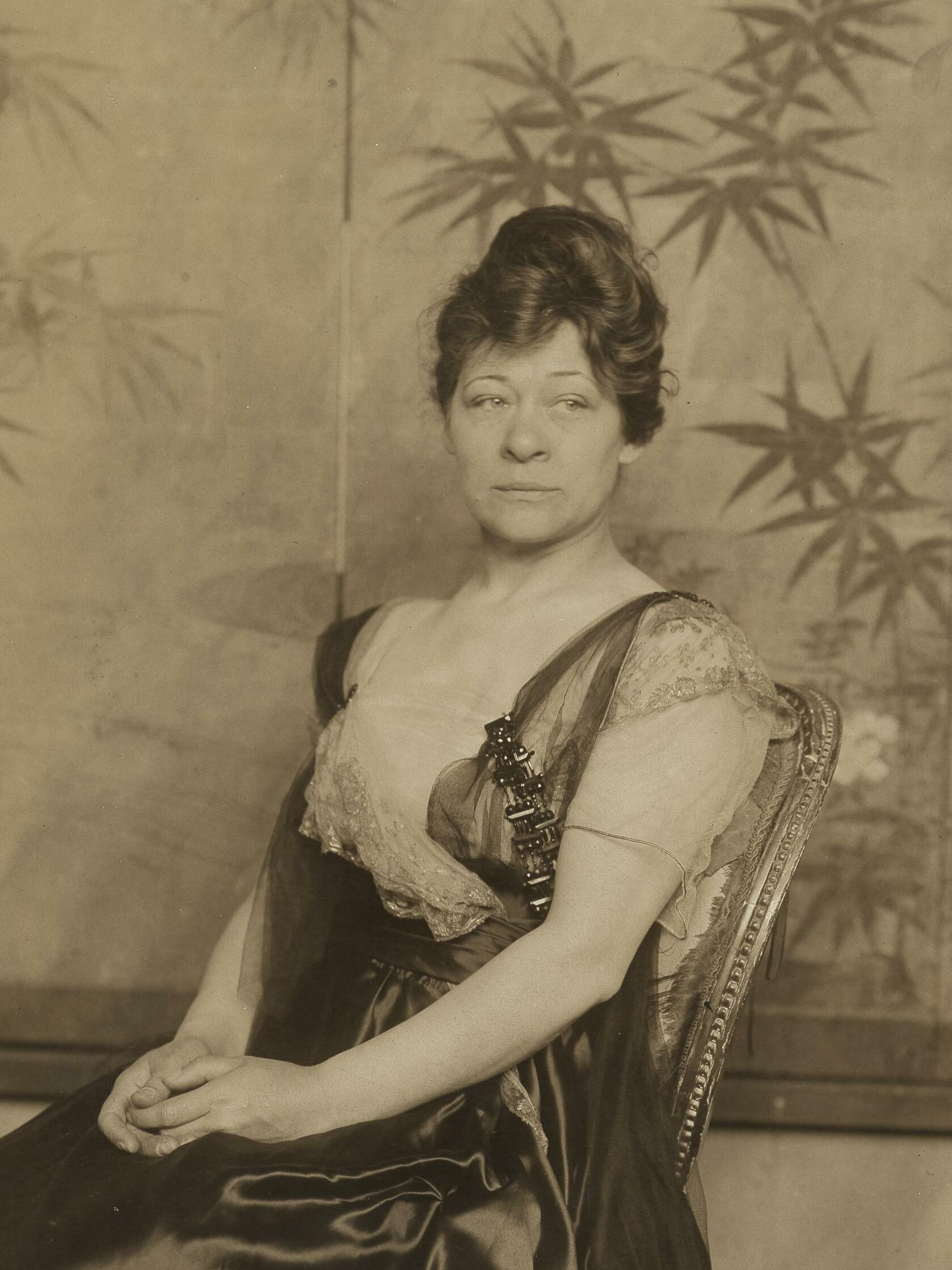
- Force in about 1920
- Born: Juliana Rieser; December 25, 1876; Doylestown, Pennsylvania, United States
- Died: August 28, 1948 (aged 71); Manhattan, New York, United States
- Occupations: Director of the Whitney Museum of Art; Regional administrator of the Public Works of Art Project
- Spouse: Willard Burdette Force

Juliana Force (December 25, 1876 – August 28, 1948) was the founding director of the Whitney Museum of Art in the United States. During the Great Depression she was the administrator of Region 2 (New York City and State) of the New Deal-era Public Works of Art Project.

== Formative years ==
Force was born to Maxmillian Rieser and Juliana Schmutz in Doylestown, Pennsylvania, on December 25, 1876. Her parents were immigrants from Baden, Germany.

She attended the Northfield Mount Hermon School in 1896 for three semesters, then left to teach English and secretarial courses at a business school in Hoboken.

== Career and marriage ==
After directing a secretarial school in New York City, she became secretary to Helen Hay Whitney, wife of a prominent financier. In 1912 she married Willard Force. Two years later, when Helen Whitney’s sister-in-law, Gertrude Vanderbilt Whitney, established the Whitney Studio to show the work of young modernist artists, Juliana Force was asked to assist in managing the studio. After the Metropolitan Museum of Art in 1929 rejected Gertrude's personal collection of contemporary works of art, the Whitney Museum of American Art was born in 1930, with Force as director. She remained director of the Whitney Museum until her death.

== Death ==
She died from cancer in Doctors Hospital in Manhattan on August 28, 1948; she was 71.
