= Whitney Museum of American Art =

Art museum in New York City

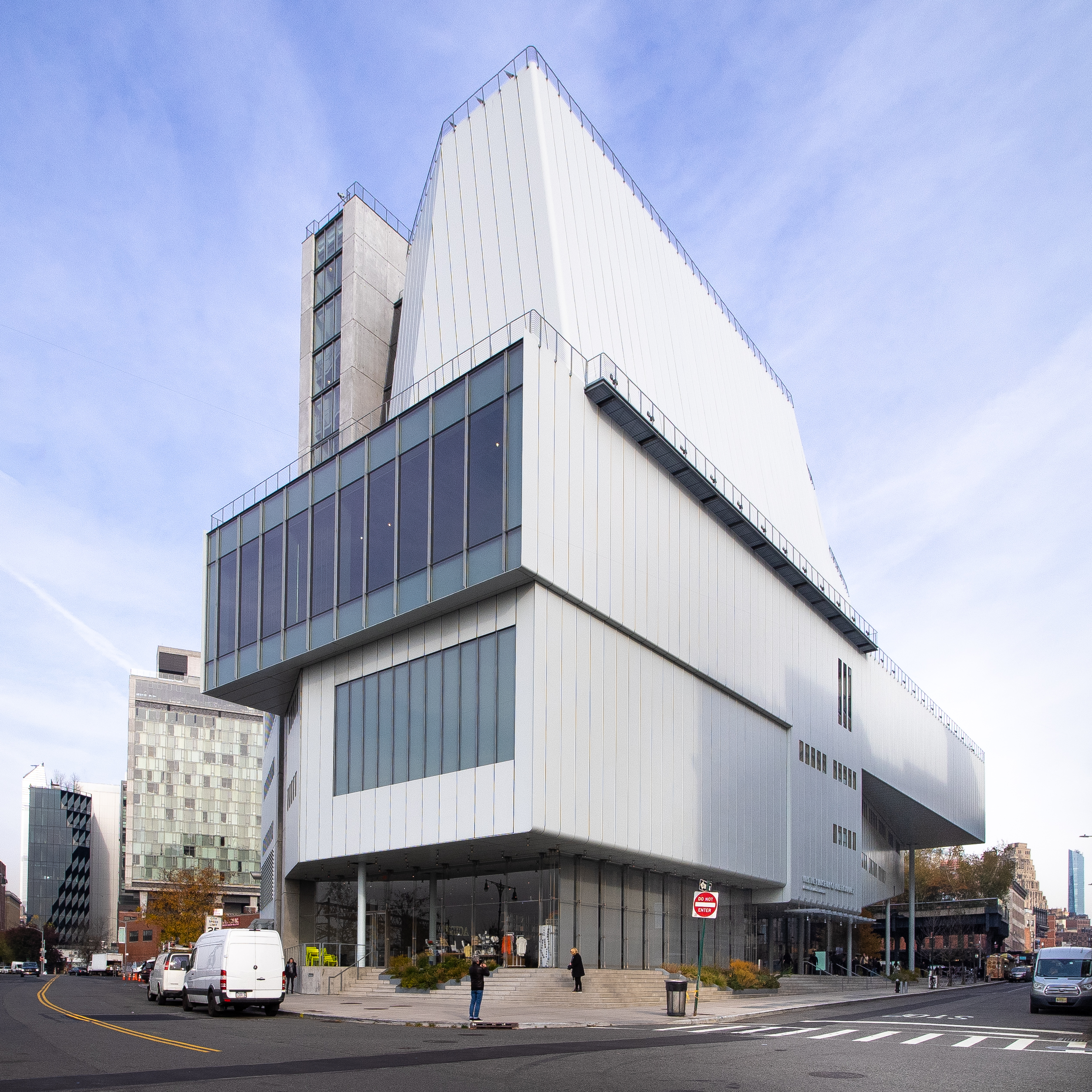
- The front of the museum (2019)
- Interactive fullscreen map
- Established: 1930
- Location: 99 Gansevoort Street, Lower Manhattan, New York City
- Coordinates: 40°44′23″N 74°00′32″W
- Type: Art museum
- Visitors: 888,816 (2024)
- Founder: Gertrude Vanderbilt Whitney
- Directors: Scott Rothkopf, Alice Pratt Brown Director
- Curators: Kim Conaty, Nancy and Steve Crown Family Chief Curator
- Architect: Renzo Piano
- Public transit access: Subway: at 14th Street – Eighth Avenue; Bus: M11, M12, M14A, M14D
- Website: whitney.org

The Whitney Museum of American Art (known informally as "The Whitney") is a modern and contemporary American art museum in the Meatpacking District and West Village neighborhoods of Manhattan in New York City, New York, United States. The institution was founded in 1930 by Gertrude Vanderbilt Whitney (1875–1942), a prominent American socialite, sculptor, and art patron after whom it is named.

The Whitney focuses on collecting and preserving 20th- and 21st-century American art. Its permanent collection, spanning the late 19th century to the present, comprises more than 25,000 paintings, sculptures, drawings, prints, photographs, films, videos, and artifacts of new media by more than 3,500 artists. It places particular emphasis on exhibiting the work of living artists as well as maintaining institutional archives of historical documents pertaining to modern and contemporary American art, including the Edward and Josephine Hopper Research Collection (the museum is the largest repository of Edward Hopper's artwork and archival materials in the world), the Sanborn Hopper Archive, and the Arshile Gorky Research Collection, among others.

From 1966 to 2014, the Whitney was located at 945 Madison Avenue on Manhattan's Upper East Side in a building designed by Marcel Breuer and Hamilton P. Smith. The museum closed in October 2014 to relocate to its current building, which was designed by Renzo Piano, at 99 Gansevoort Street and opened on May 1, 2015, expanding the museum exhibition space to 50,000 square feet (4,600 m^{2}).

Every two years, the museum organizes the Whitney Biennial, an exhibition showcasing the work of emerging American artists; it is considered the longest-running and most important survey of contemporary art in the United States. The museum also heads the Whitney Independent Study Program, which began in 1968, to support artists, critics and art historians by "encouraging the theoretical and critical study of the practices, institutions, and discourses that constitute the field of culture". In 2024, with 888,816 visitors, the Whitney was the 31st most-visited museum in the United States and the 90th most-visited art museum in the world.

== History ==
=== Early years ===
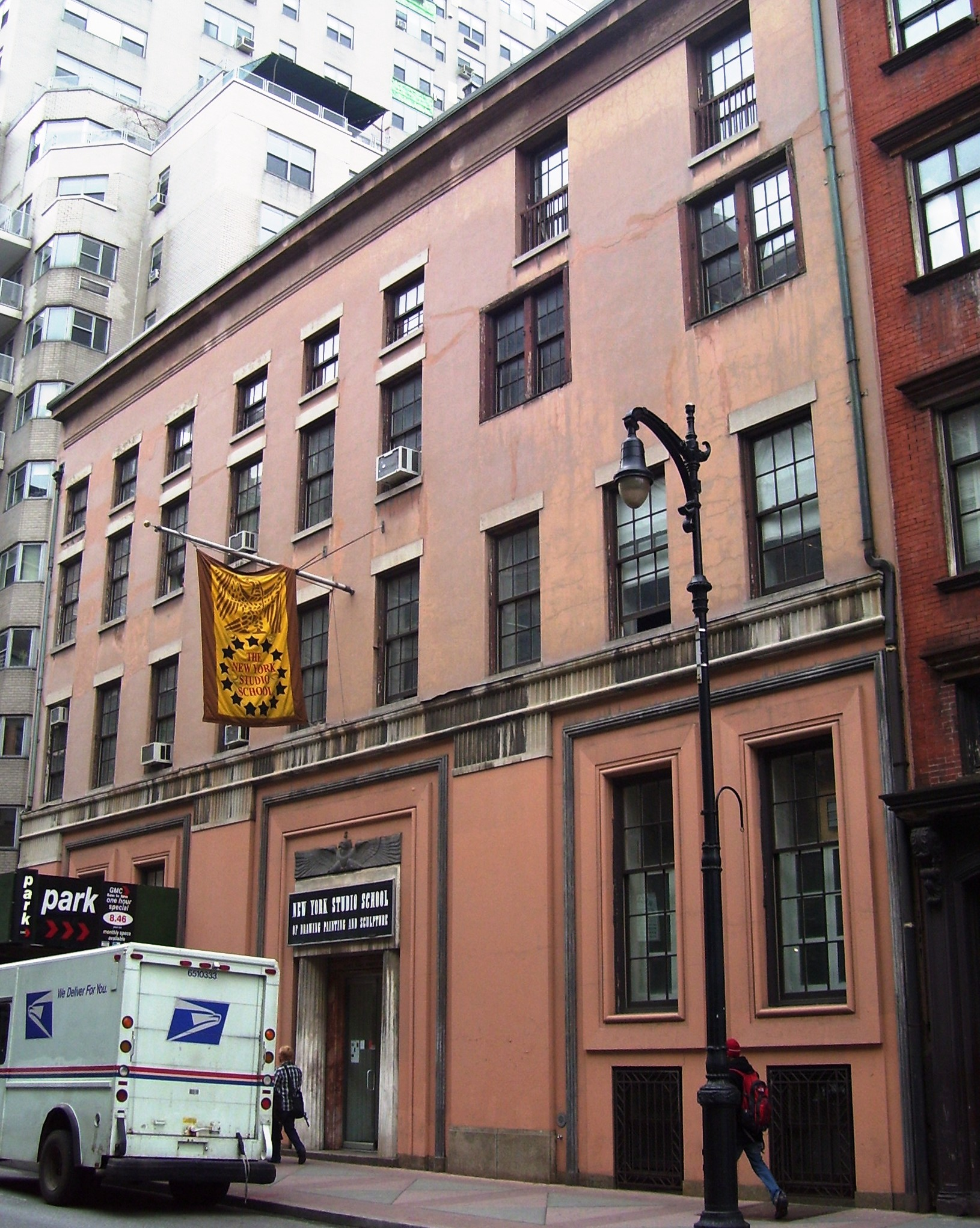
The Whitney's original location, at 8–12 West 8th Street, between Fifth Avenue and MacDougal Street in Greenwich Village

Gertrude Vanderbilt Whitney, the museum's namesake and founder, was a well-regarded sculptor and serious art collector. As a patron of the arts, she began acquiring art in 1905, and had achieved some success with the Whitney Studio and Whitney Studio Club, New York–based exhibition spaces she operated from 1914 to 1928 to promote the works of avant garde and unrecognized American artists. Whitney favored the radical art of the American artists of the Ashcan School such as John Sloan, George Luks, and Everett Shinn, as well as others such as Edward Hopper, Stuart Davis, Charles Demuth, Charles Sheeler, and Max Weber.

With the aid of her assistant, Juliana R. Force, Whitney collected nearly 700 works of American art. In 1929, she offered to donate over 500 to the Metropolitan Museum of Art, but the museum declined the gift. This, along with the apparent preference for European modernism at the recently opened Museum of Modern Art, led Whitney to start her own museum, exclusively for American art, in 1929.

Whitney Library archives from 1928 reveal that during this time, the Studio Club used the gallery space of Wilhelmina Weber Furlong of the Art Students League to exhibit traveling shows featuring modernist work. The Whitney Museum of American Art was founded in 1930; at this time architect Noel L. Miller was converting three row houses on West 8th Street in Greenwich Village—one of which, 8 West 8th Street had been the location of the Studio Club—to be the museum's home, as well as a residence for Whitney. The museum opened November 18, 1931. Juliana Force became the museum's first director, and under her guidance, it concentrated on displaying the works of new and contemporary American artists. She declared at the opening, "There may be pictures here that you do not like, but they are here to stay, so you may as well get used to them."

In 1954, the museum left its original location and moved to a small structure on 54th Street connected to and behind the Museum of Modern Art on 53rd Street. On April 15, 1958, a fire on MOMA's second floor that killed one person forced the evacuation of paintings and staff on MOMA's upper floors to the Whitney. Among the paintings evacuated was A Sunday Afternoon on the Island of La Grande Jatte, which was on loan from the Art Institute of Chicago.

=== Move to the Upper East Side ===
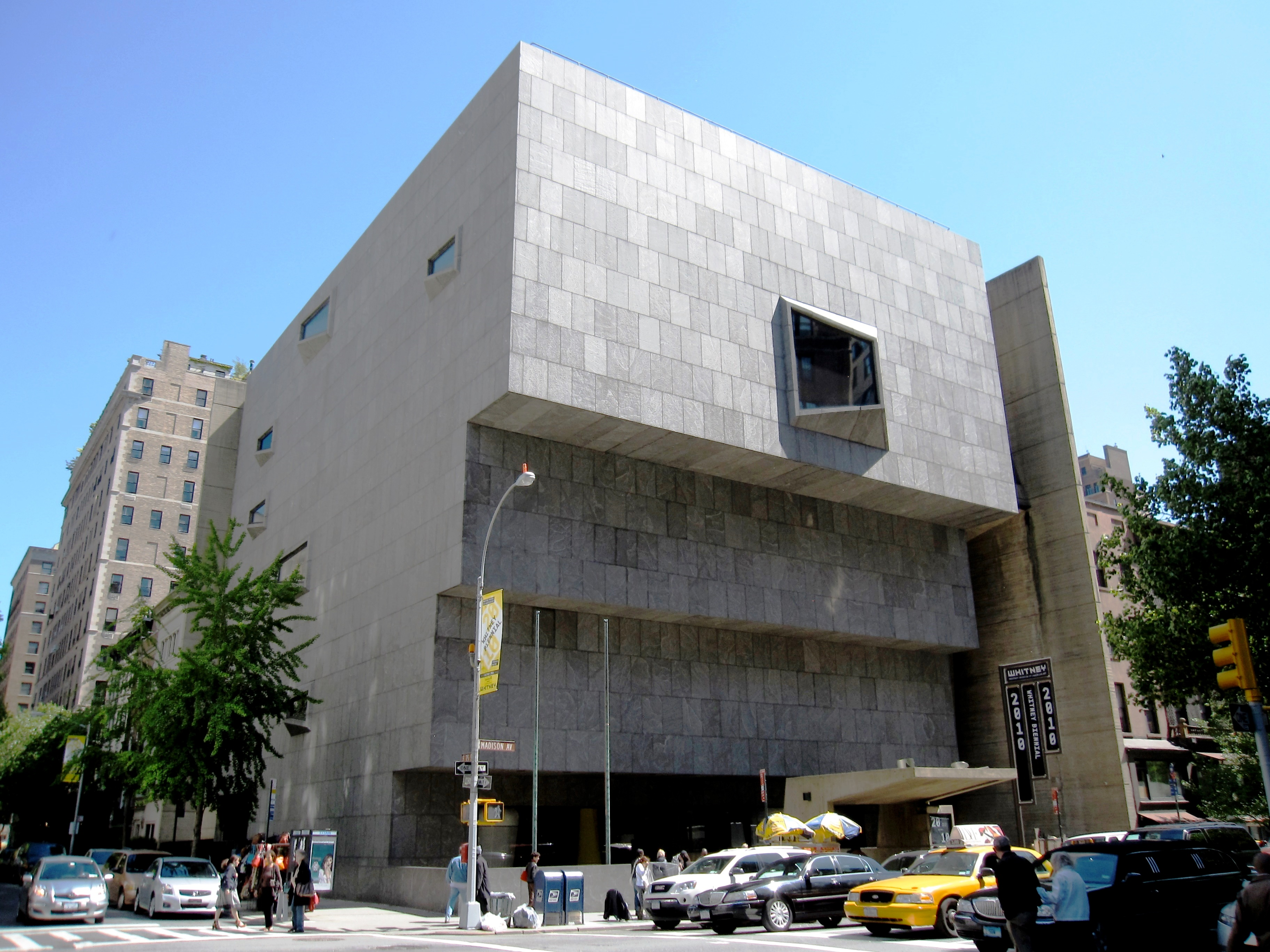
945 Madison Avenue was the Whitney's home from 1966 to 2014; the Marcel Breuer-designed building has seen numerous subsequent uses.

In 1961, the Whitney began seeking a site for a larger building. In 1966, it settled at the southeast corner of Madison Avenue and 75th Street on Manhattan's Upper East Side. The building, planned and built 1963–1966 by Marcel Breuer and Hamilton P. Smith in a distinctively modern style, is easily distinguished from the neighboring townhouses by its staircase façade made of granite stones and its trapezoidal windows. In 1967, Mauricio Lasansky showed "The Nazi Drawings". The exhibition traveled to the Whitney, where it appeared with shows by Louise Nevelson and Andrew Wyeth as the first exhibits in the new museum.

The institution grappled with space problems for decades. In 1967, the museum opened a satellite space called the Art Resources Center (ARC). Originally intended to be located in the South Bronx, the ARC opened on Cherry Street on the Lower East Side. From 1973 to 1983, the Whitney operated a branch at 55 Water Street, a building owned by Harold Uris, who gave the museum a lease for $1 a year. In 1983, Philip Morris International installed a Whitney branch in the lobby of its Park Avenue headquarters. In 1981, the museum opened an exhibition space in Stamford, Connecticut, housed at Champion International. In the late 1980s, the Whitney entered into arrangements with Park Tower Realty, IBM, and the Equitable Life Assurance Society of the United States, setting up satellite museums with rotating exhibitions in their buildings' lobbies. Each museum had its own director, with all plans approved by a Whitney committee.

The institution attempted to expand its landmark building in 1978, commissioning UK architects Derek Walker and Norman Foster to design a tall tower alongside it, the first of several proposals from leading architects, but each time, the effort was abandoned, because of the cost, the design, or both. To secure additional space for the museum's collections, then-director Thomas N. Armstrong III developed plans for a 10-story, $37.5 million addition to the main building. The proposed addition, designed by Michael Graves and announced in 1985, drew immediate opposition. Graves had proposed demolishing the flanking brownstones down to the East 74th Street corner for a complementary addition. The project gradually lost the support of the museum's trustees, and the plans were dropped in 1989. In 1988, a satellite branch was opened at 33 Maiden Lane. Between 1995 and 1998, the building underwent a renovation and expansion by Richard Gluckman. In 2001, Rem Koolhaas was commissioned to submit two designs for a $200 million expansion. Those plans were dropped in 2003, causing director Maxwell L. Anderson to resign. New York restaurateur Danny Meyer opened Untitled, a restaurant in the museum, in March 2011. The space was designed by the Rockwell Group.

=== Move downtown ===
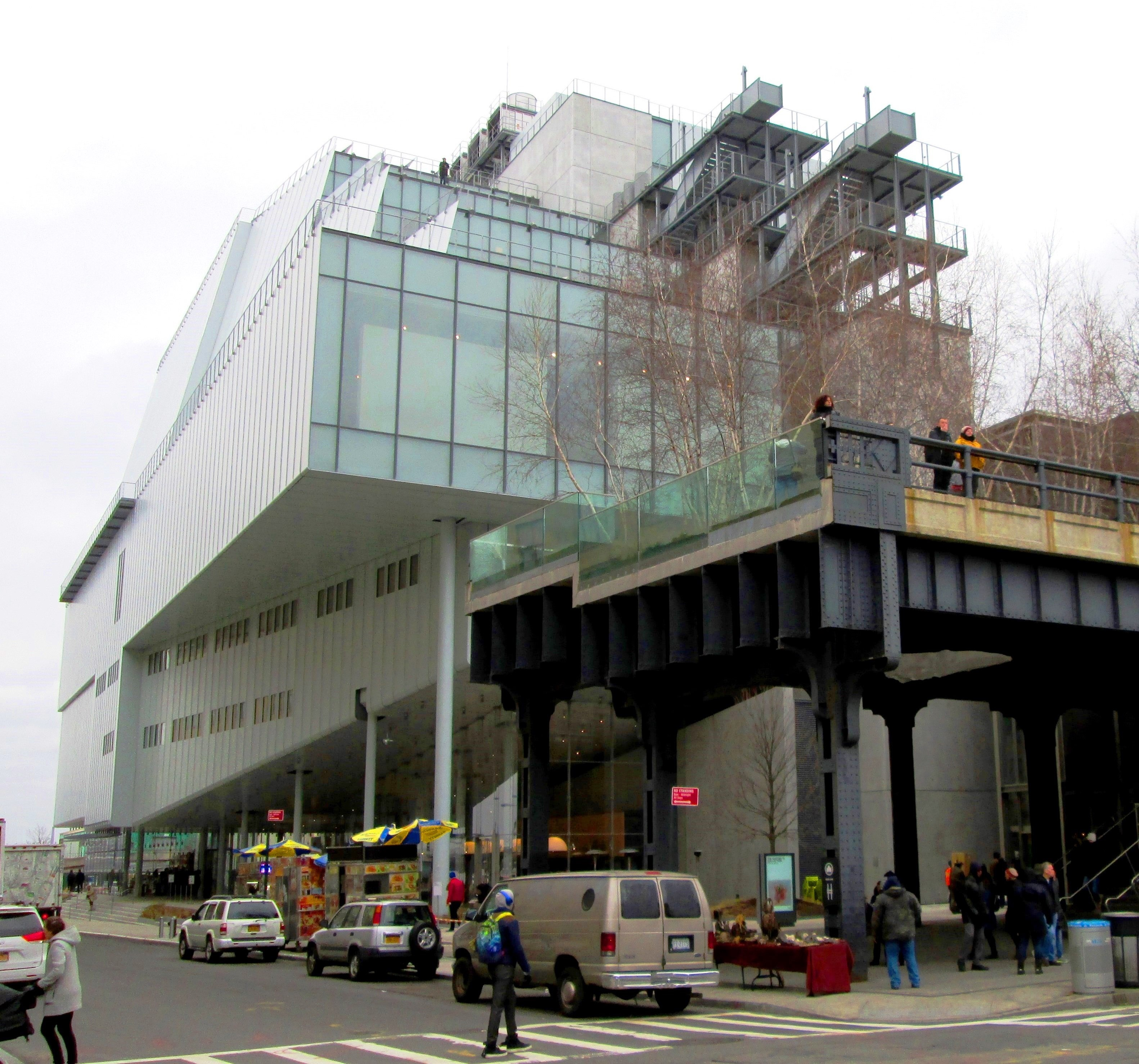
Entrance to the Whitney (left) with High Line in foreground

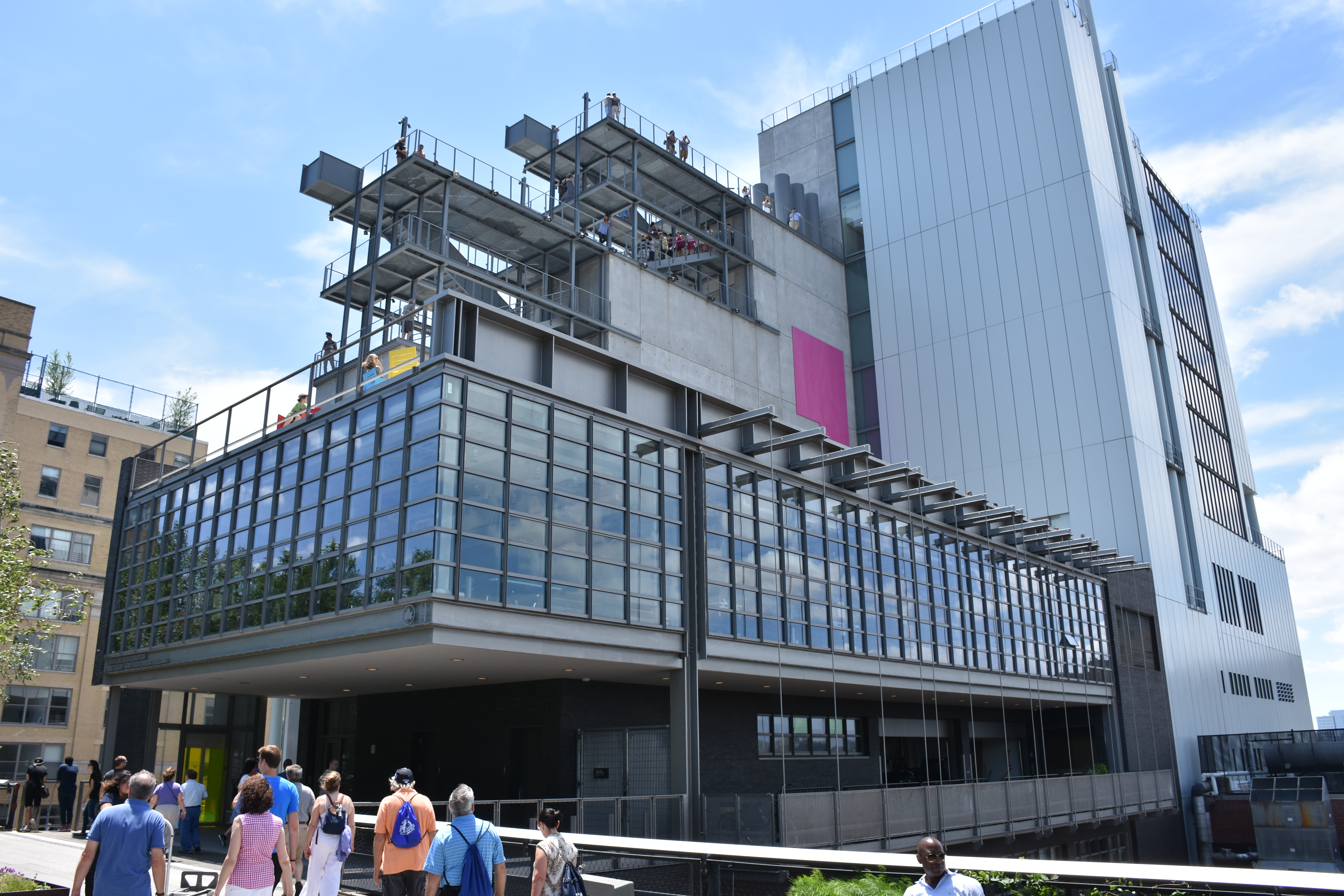
The current home of the Whitney, a building designed by Renzo Piano

The Whitney developed a new main building, designed by Renzo Piano, in the West Village and Meatpacking District in lower Manhattan. The new museum, at the intersection of Gansevoort and Washington Streets, was built on a previously city-owned site and marks the southern entrance to the High Line park. Construction began in 2010, and the project cost $422 million. After an April 30, 2015, ceremonial ribbon-cutting attended by Michelle Obama and Bill de Blasio, the new building opened on May 1, 2015. Robert Silman Associates was the structural engineer; Jaros, Baum & Bolles provided MEP services; Ove Arup & Partners was the lighting/daylighting engineer; and Turner Construction LLC served as construction manager.

The new structure spans 200,000 square feet (19,000 m^{2}) and eight stories that include the city's largest column-free art gallery spaces, an education center, theater, a conservation laboratory, and a library and reading rooms. Two of the floors are fully devoted to the museum's permanent collection. The only permanent artwork commissioned for the site—its four main elevators—were conceived by Richard Artschwager. The new building's collection comprises over 600 works by over 400 artists. Observation decks on the floors five through eight are linked by an outdoor staircase.

The new building is much more expansive and open than the old ones. As one New York Times review described the building:

The Whitney ... has a series of events spaces at its margins: a flexible auditorium and four large terraces, three of which are linked by an outdoor staircase. ... It has timed tickets that are designed to control crowding, but people may linger longer than expected. After art they can retire to the eighth-floor cafe, the terraces or the lines of comfy leather couches facing glass walls overlooking the Hudson and Greenwich Village at either end of the fifth floor.

The museum needed to raise $760 million for the building and its endowment. In May 2011, the Metropolitan Museum of Art announced it had entered into an agreement to occupy the Madison Avenue building for at least eight years starting in 2015, easing the Whitney's burden of having to finance two large museum spaces. The occupation of the old space was later postponed to 2016.

=== 2018–2019 protests ===
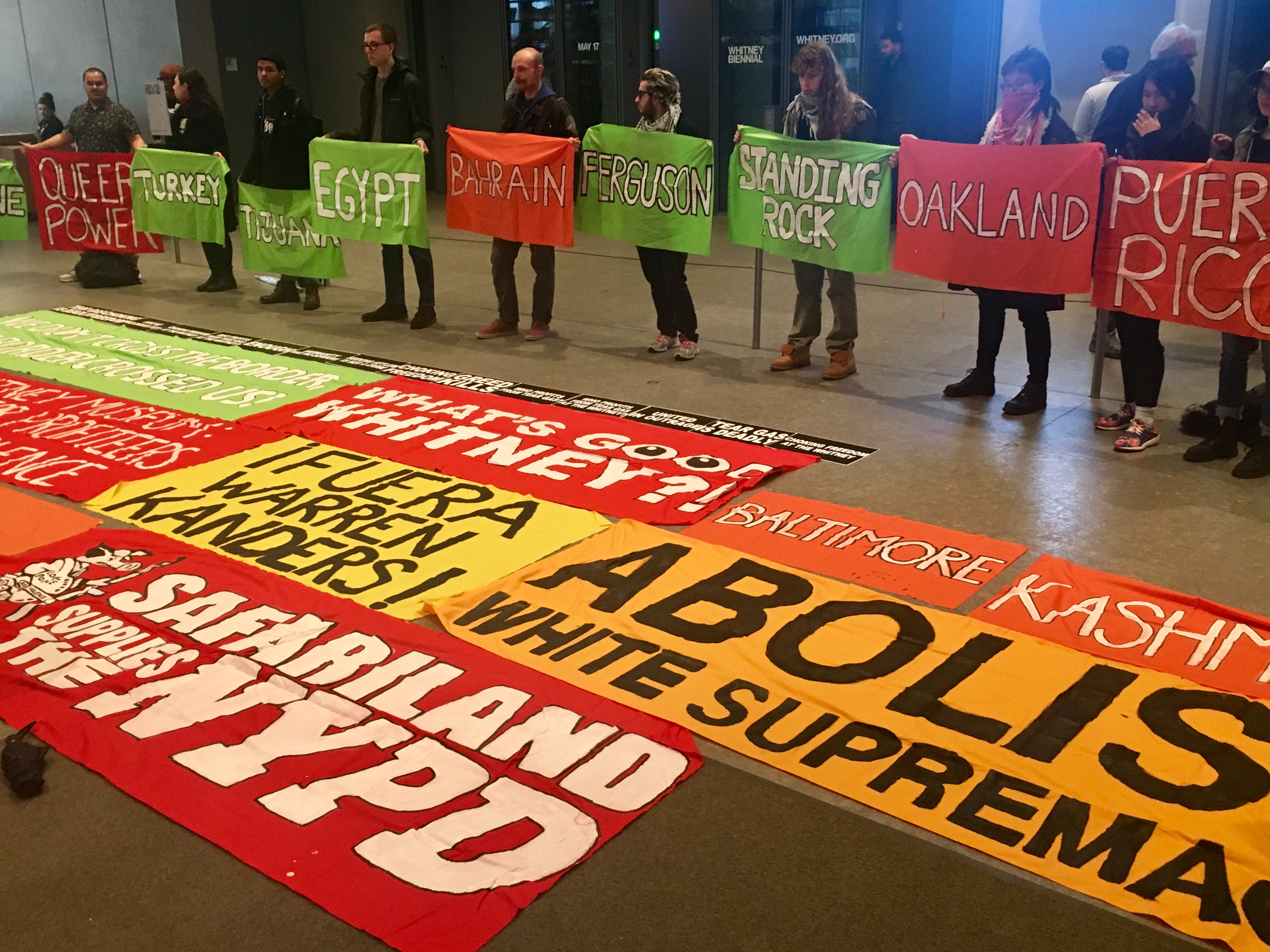
Banners from April 5, 2019, protest by Decolonize This Place at the Whitney Museum, New York NY, over board vice chair Warren Kanders' ownership of Safariland, a manufacturer of tear gas and other weapons

The board of trustees has come under criticism since November 2018 by groups including Decolonize This Place, the Chinatown Art Brigade, and W.A.G.E., for vice chair Warren Kanders' ownership of the company Safariland, which manufactured tear gas used against the late-2018 migrant caravans; 120 scholars and critics published an open letter to the Whitney Museum asking for the removal of Kanders from the museum board; additional signatories after the letter's initial posting included almost 50 artists who have been selected for the 2019 Whitney Biennial. A series of nine weeks of protest by Decolonize This Place highlighted the use of Safariland weapons against protestors and others in Palestine and other places.

On July 17, 2019, calls for Kanders's resignation were renewed following Artforum's publication of an essay, "The Tear Gas Biennial", by Hannah Black, Ciarán Finlayson, and Tobi Haslett. On July 19, four artists (Korakrit Arunanondchai, Meriem Bennani, Nicole Eisenman, and Nicholas Galanin) published a letter, also in Artforum, asking their work to be withdrawn from the exhibition. (The first artist to withdraw was Michael Rakowitz, who withdrew his work before the Biennial opened.) A day later, a second wave of artists (Eddie Arroyo, Christine Sun Kim, Agustina Woodgate, and Forensic Architecture) also withdrew.

On July 25, 2019, Warren B. Kanders announced his resignation from the board of trustees of the Whitney Museum. Kanders cited no wish to play a role in the museum's demise and urged fellow trustees to step up and assume leadership of the Whitney.

== Collection ==
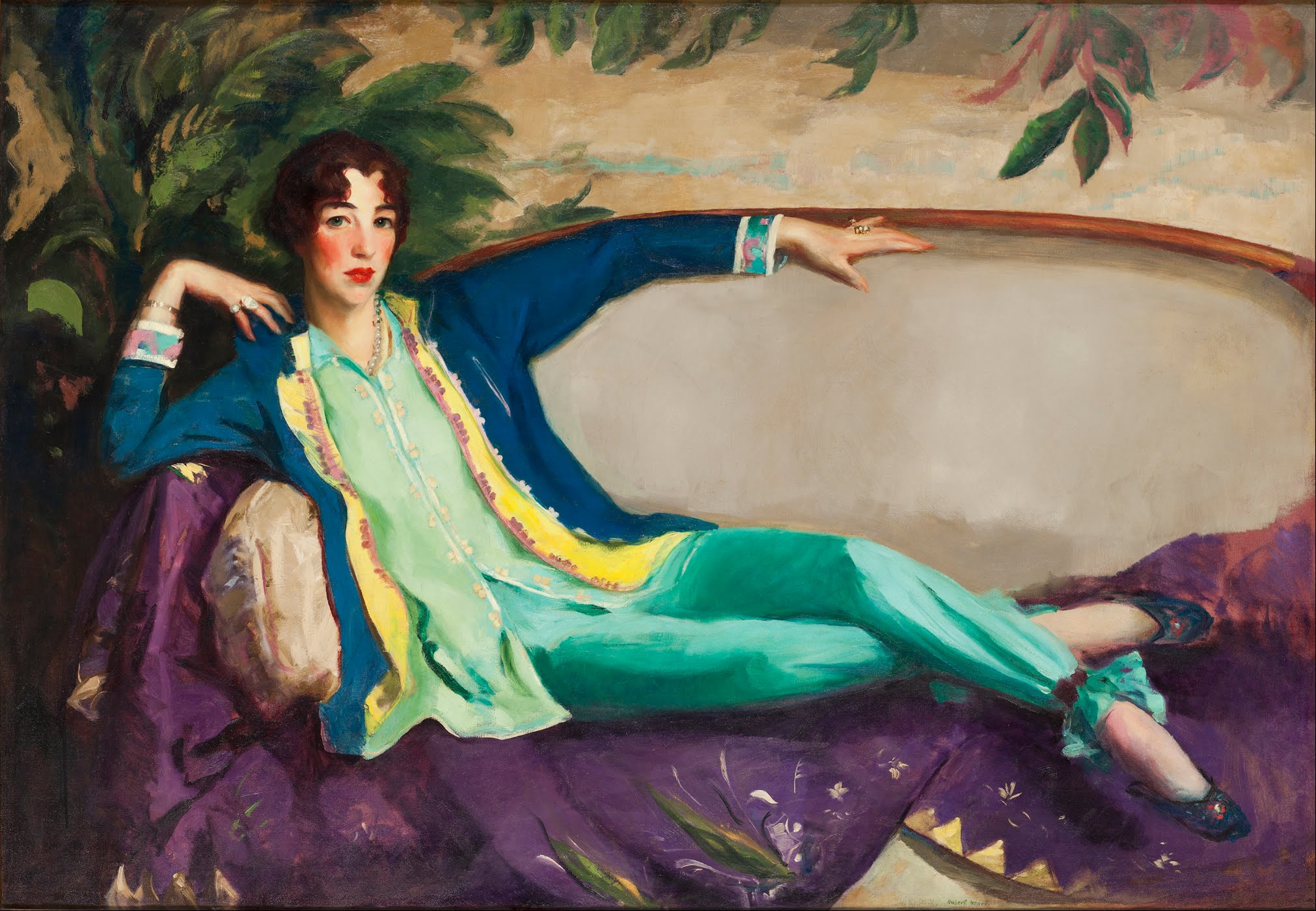
Gertrude Vanderbilt Whitney by Robert Henri (1916)

The museum displays paintings, drawings, prints, sculptures, installation art, video, and photography.

The original 600 works in the permanent collection grew to about 1,300 with the opening of the second building in 1954. This number grew to around 2,000 following its move to the Breuer building on Madison Avenue in 1966. It began collecting photography in 1991. Today, spanning the late 19th century to the present, the collection contains more than 25,000 artworks by upwards of 3,500 artists. Artists represented include Josef Albers, Joe Andoe, Edmund Archer, Donald Baechler, Thomas Hart Benton, Lucile Blanch, Jonathan Borofsky, Louise Bourgeois, Frank Bowling, Sonia Gordon Brown, Charles Burchfield, Alexander Calder, Suzanne Caporael, Norman Carton, Carolina Caycedo, Ching Ho Cheng, Talia Chetrit, Ann Craven, Anna Craycroft, Dan Christensen, Greg Colson, Susan Crocker, Ronald Davis, Stuart Davis, Mira Dancy, Lindsey Decker, Martha Diamond, Richard Diebenkorn, Daniella Dooling, Arthur Dove, Loretta Dunkelman, William Eggleston, Helen Frankenthaler, Georgia O'Keeffe, Arshile Gorky, Keith Haring, Grace Hartigan, Marsden Hartley, Robert Henri, Carmen Herrera, Eva Hesse, Hans Hofmann, Edward Hopper, Richard Hunt, Jasper Johns, Corita Kent, Franz Kline, Terence Koh, Willem de Kooning, Lee Krasner, Ronnie Landfield, Roy Lichtenstein, John Marin, Knox Martin, Allan McCollum, John McCracken, John McLaughlin, Robert Motherwell, Bruce Nauman, Louise Nevelson, Barnett Newman, Kenneth Noland, Paul Pfeiffer, Jackson Pollock, Larry Poons, Maurice Prendergast, Kenneth Price, Robert Rauschenberg, Man Ray, Mark Rothko, Morgan Russell, Albert Pinkham Ryder, Cindy Sherman, John Sloan, Frank Stella, Andy Warhol, and hundreds of others.

Every two years, the museum hosts the Whitney Biennial, an international art show which displays many lesser-known artists new to the American art scene. It has displayed works by many notable artists, and has featured unconventional works, such as a 1976 exhibit of live body builders, featuring Arnold Schwarzenegger.

In addition to its traditional collection, the Whitney has a website, Artport, that features "Net Art" that changes regularly. The Whitney will not sell any work by a living artist because it could damage that artist's career, but it will trade a living artist's work for another piece by the same artist.

=== Gallery ===
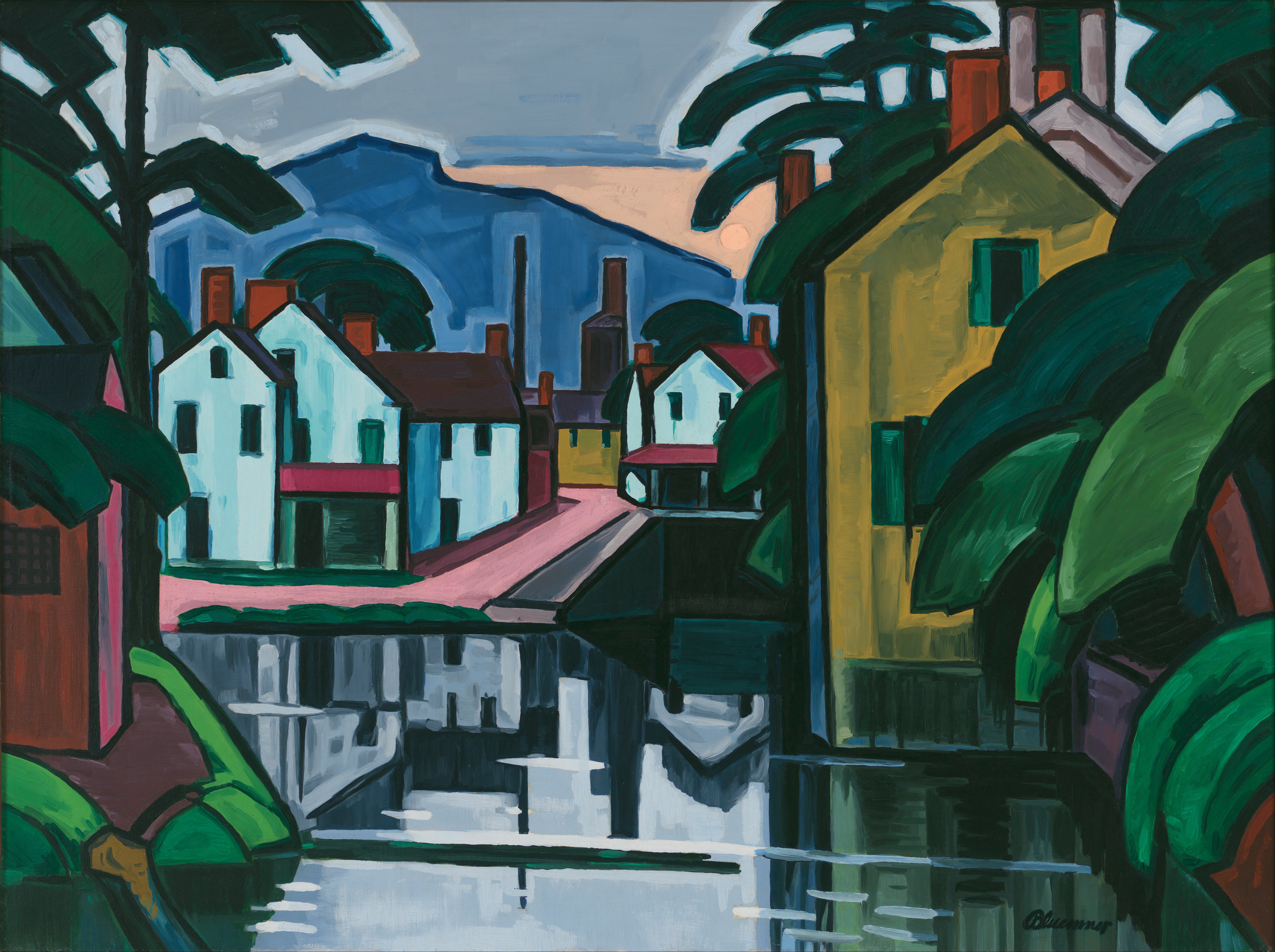
Oscar Florianus Bluemner, Old Canal Port, (1914)

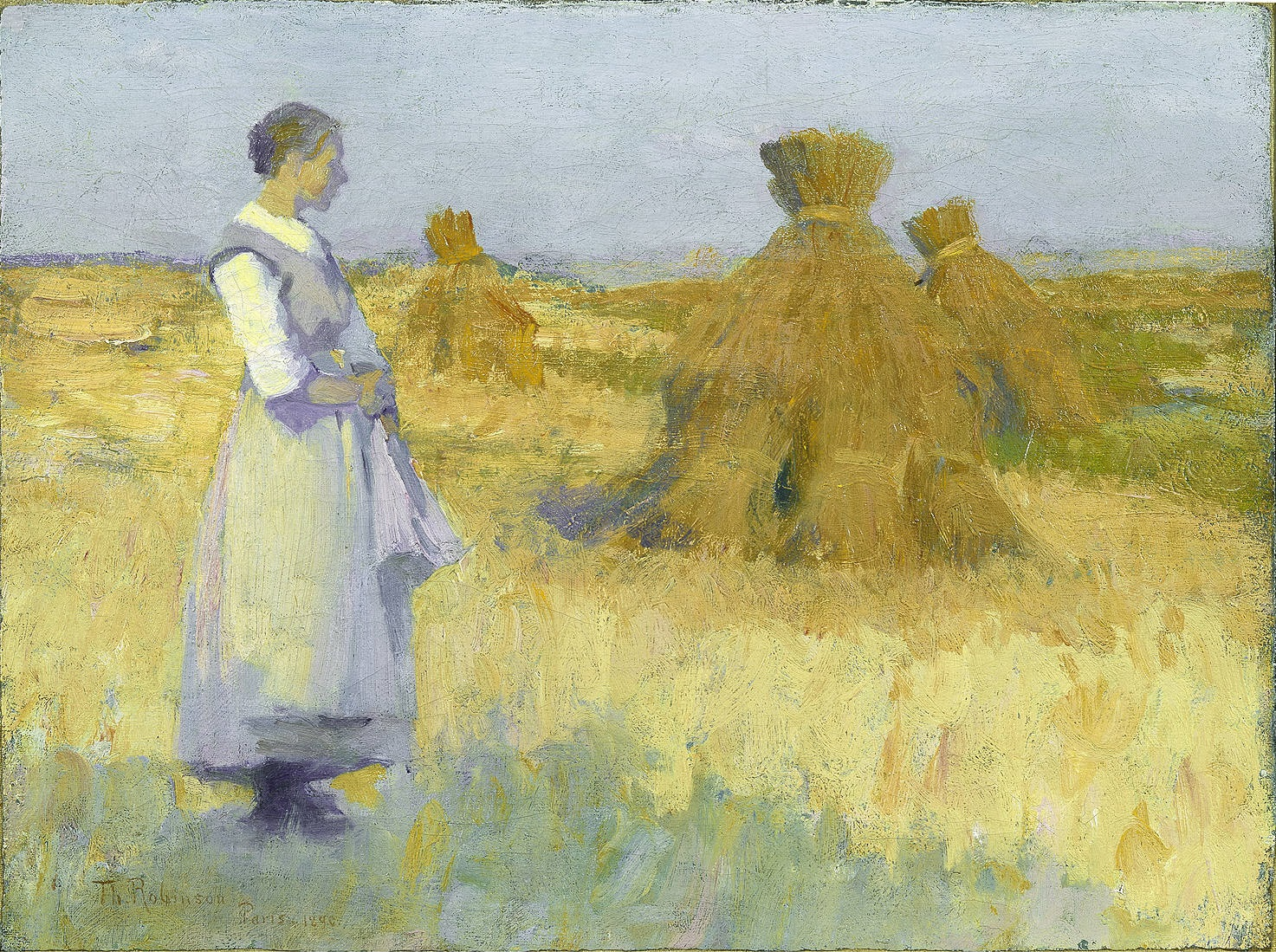
Theodore Robinson, Etude, (1890)

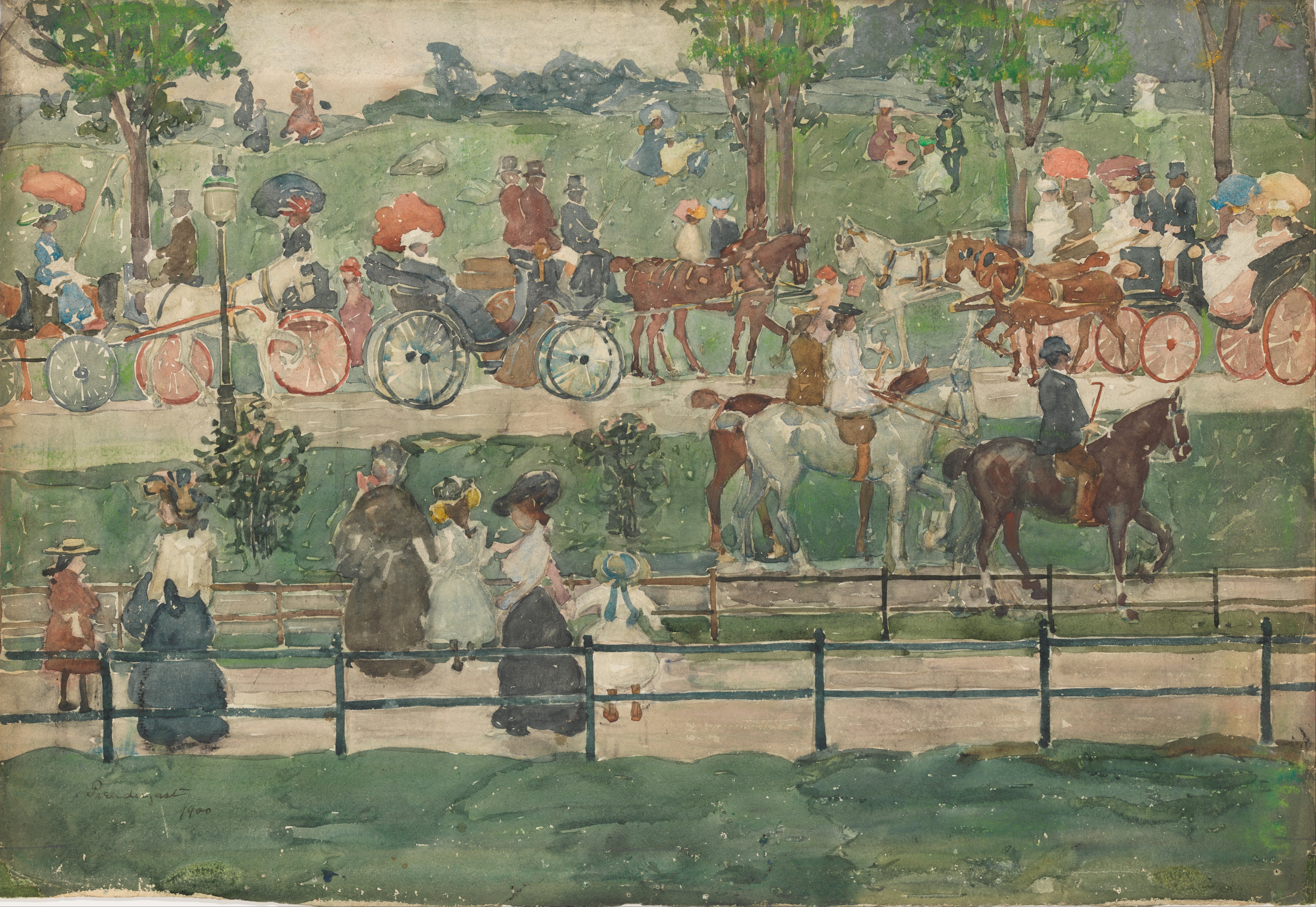
Maurice Prendergast, Central Park, 1900, (1900)

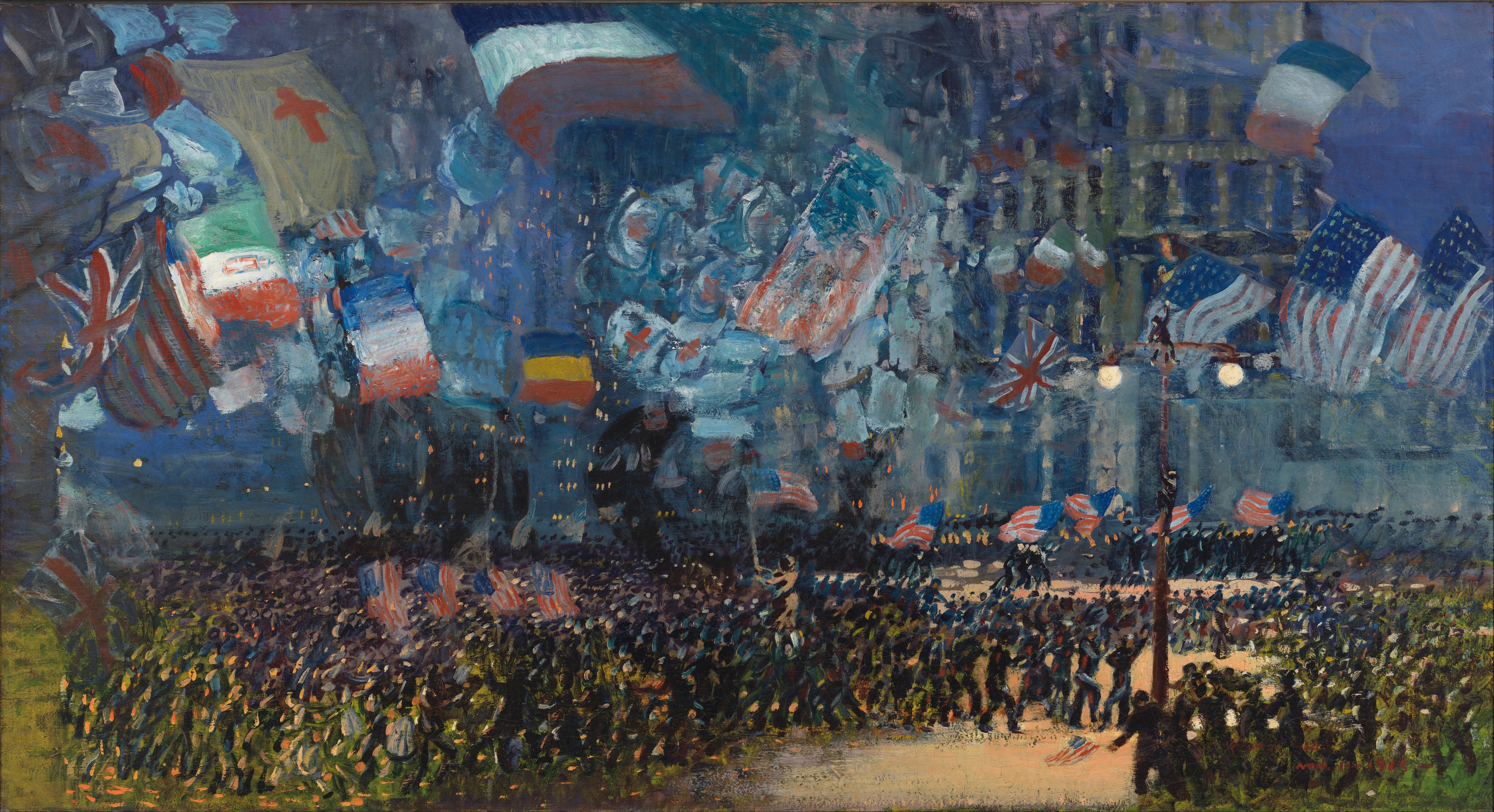
George Luks, Armistice Night, (1918)

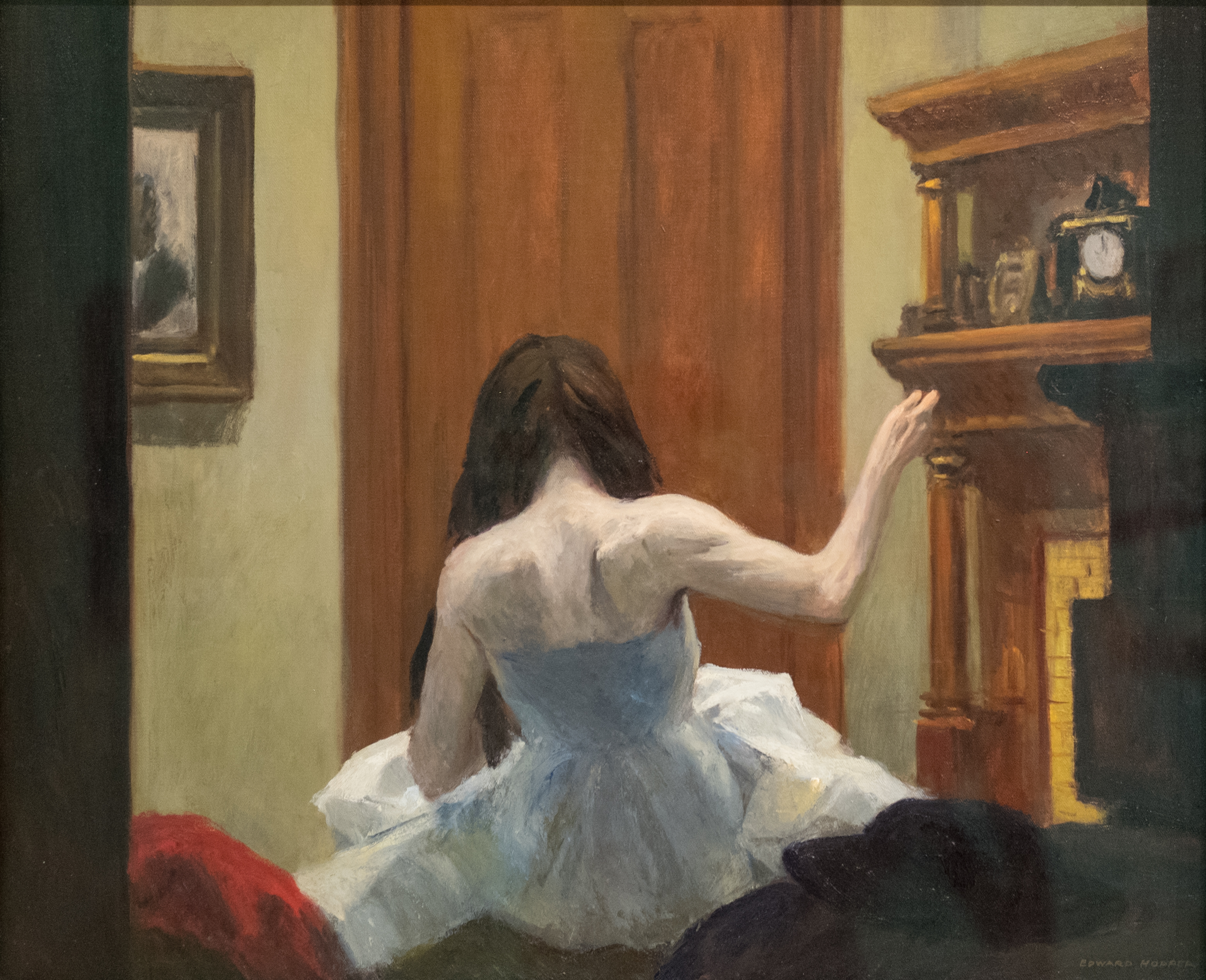
Edward Hopper, New York Interior, c. 1921

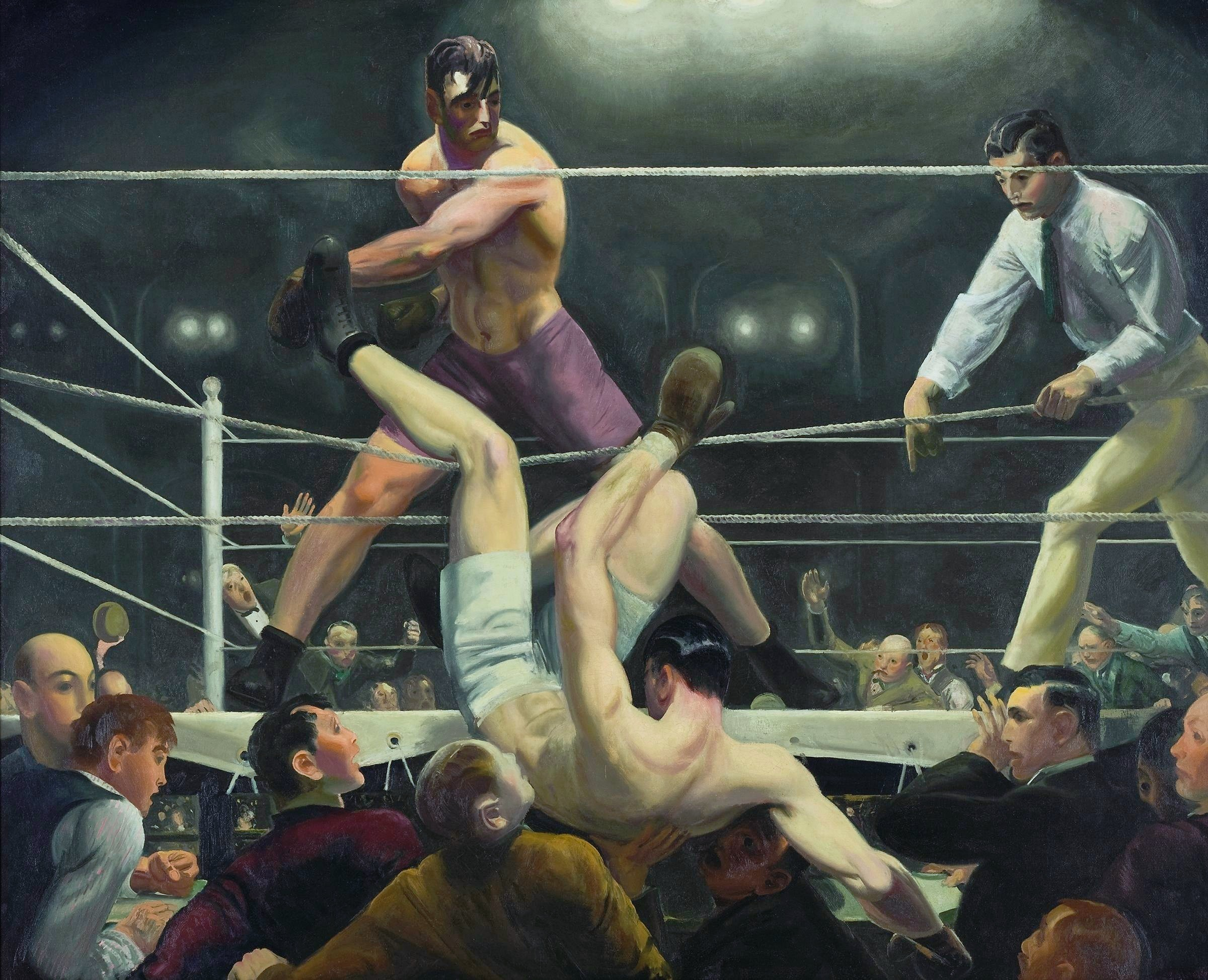
George Bellows, Dempsey and Firpo, (1924)

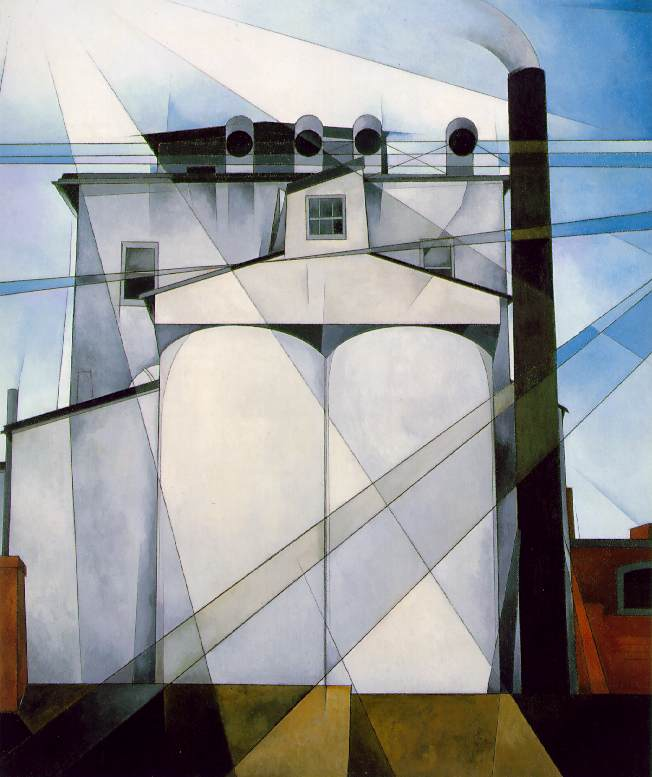
Charles Demuth, My Egypt, 1927

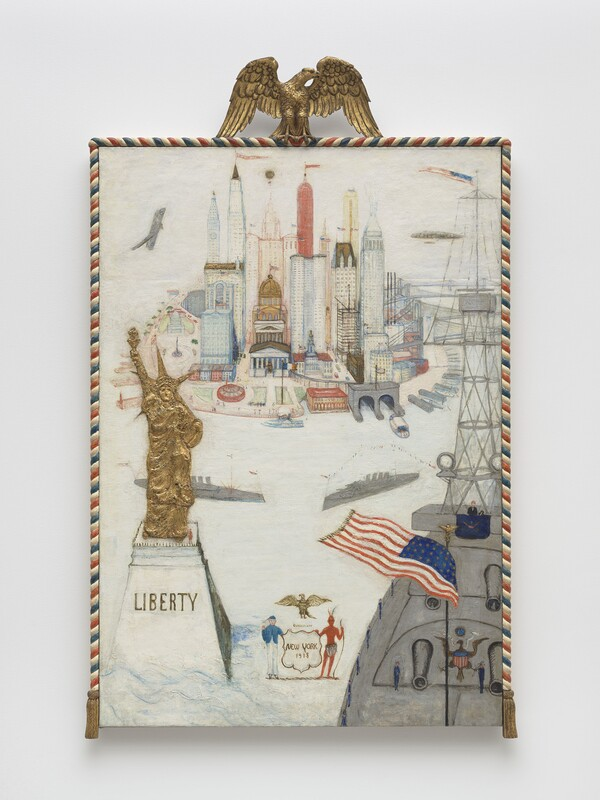
Florine Stettheimer, New York/Liberty, 1918–1919

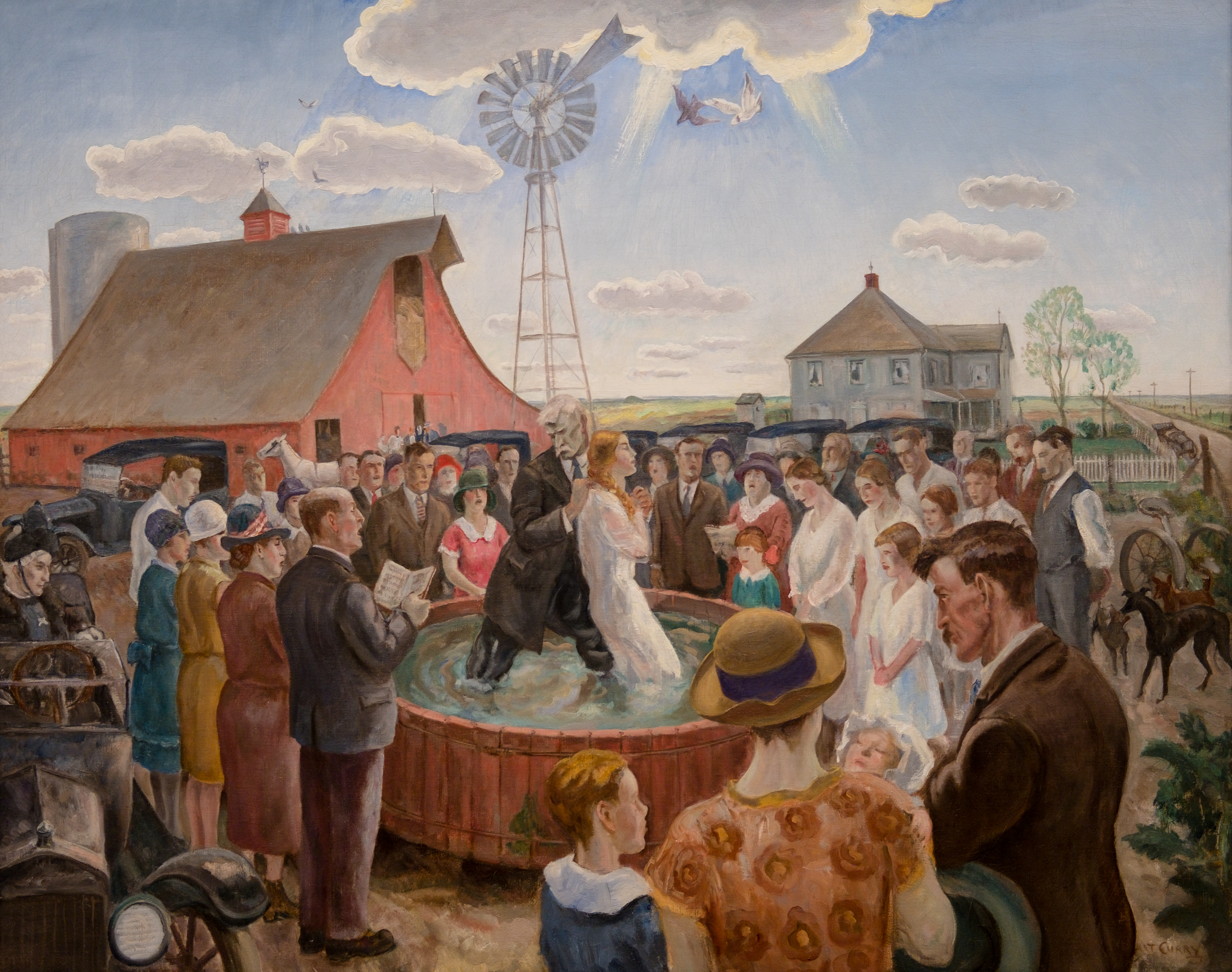
John Steuart Curry, Baptism in Kansas, 1928

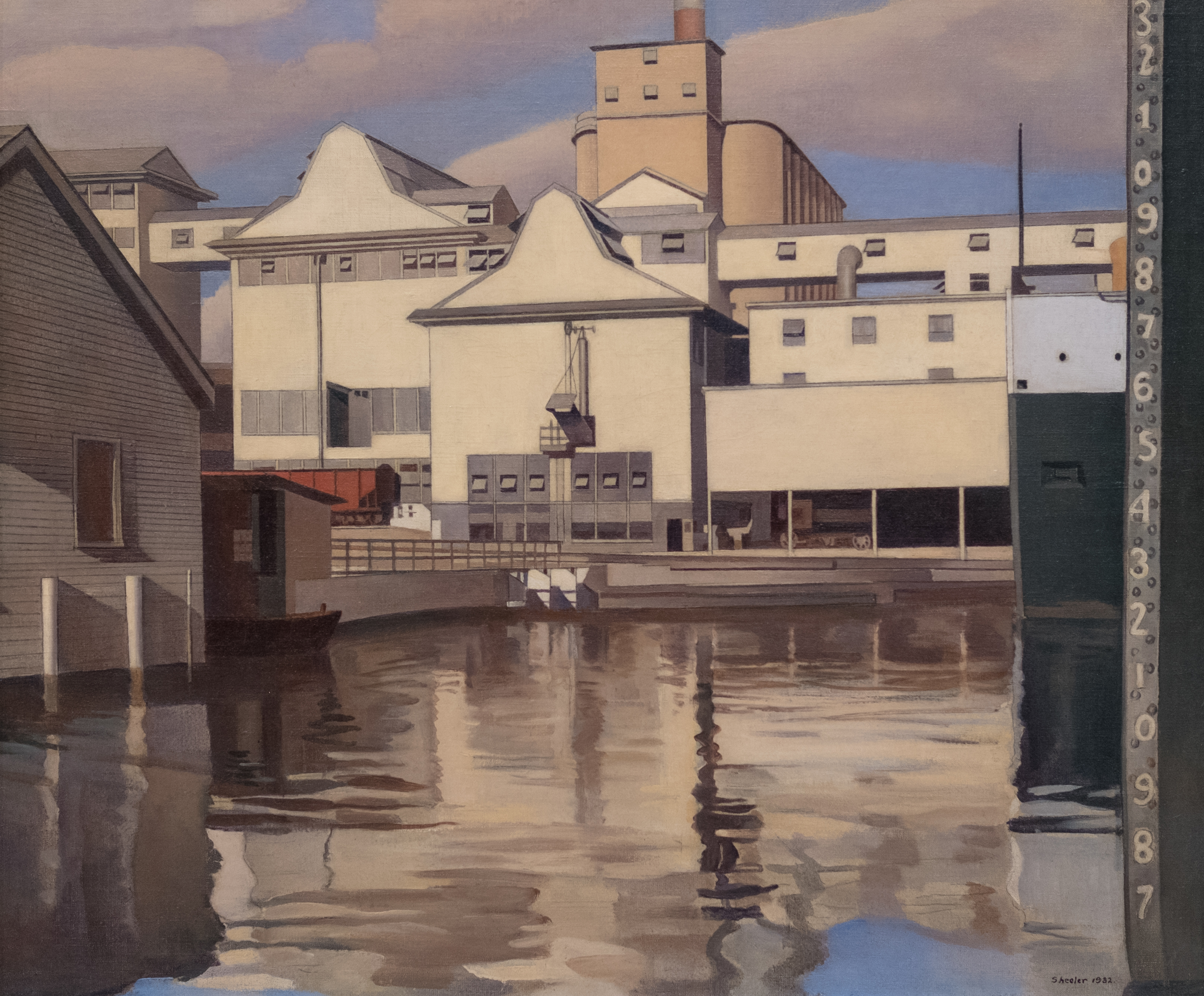
Charles Sheeler, River Rouge Plant, 1932

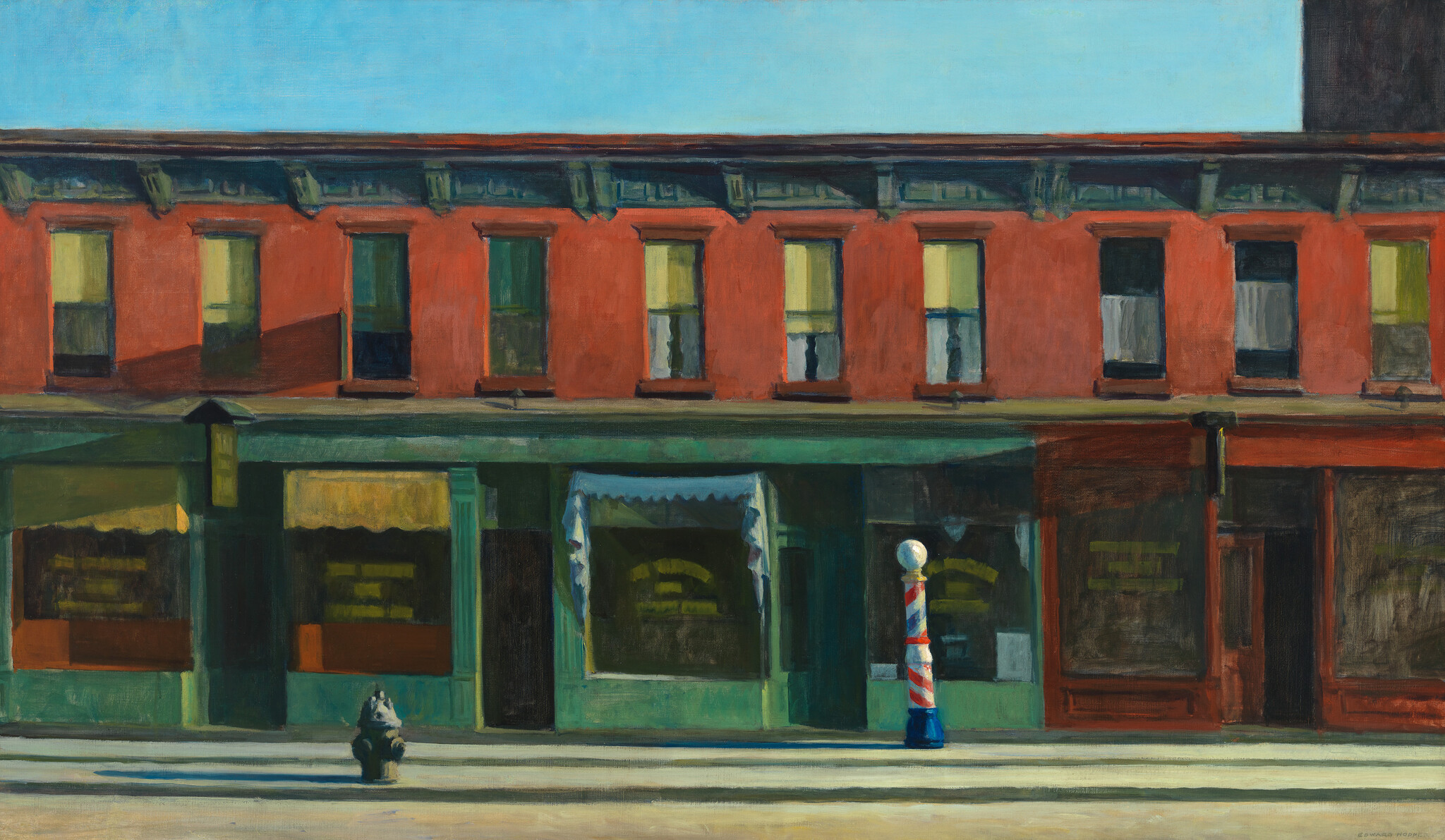
Edward Hopper, Early Sunday Morning, 1930

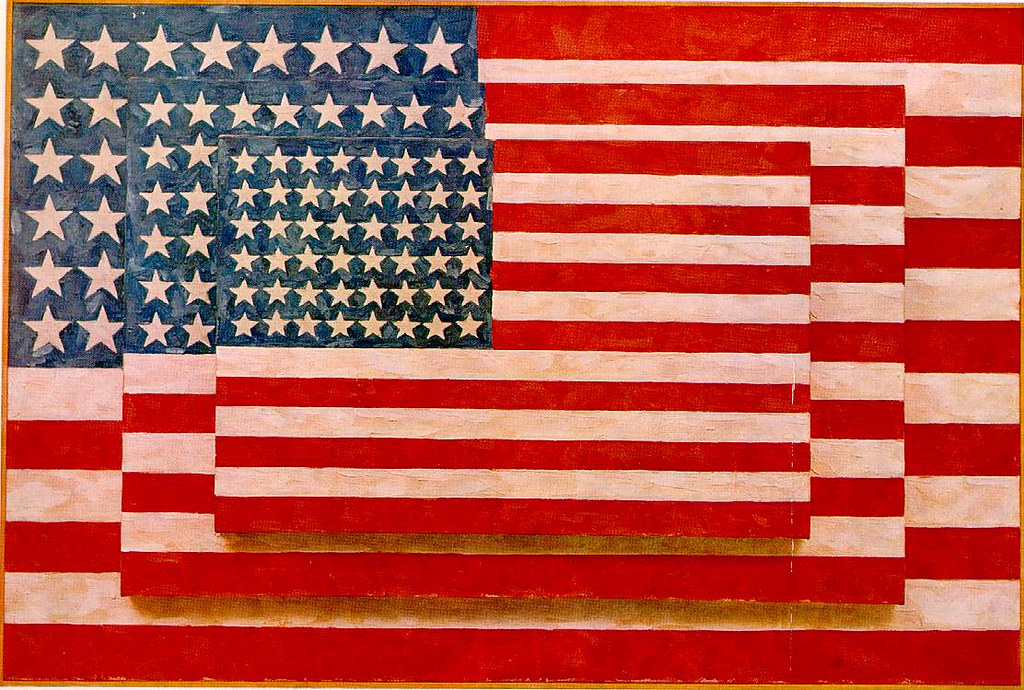
Jasper Johns, Three Flags, 1958

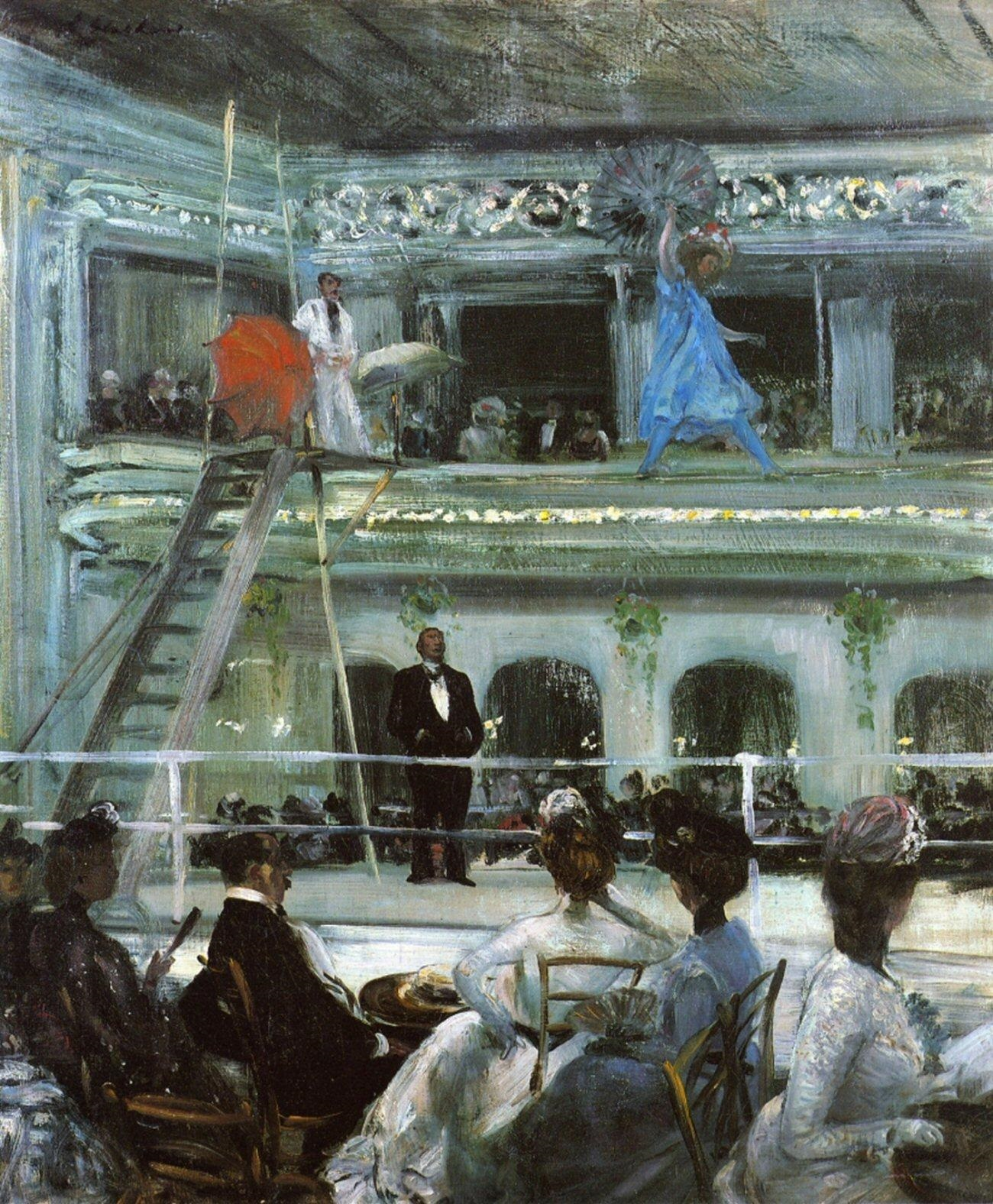
William Glackens, Hammerstein's Roof Garden, c. 1901

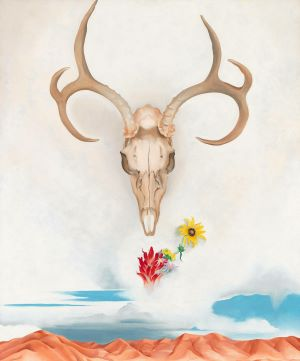
Georgia O'Keeffe, Summer Days, 1936

== Library ==
The Frances Mulhall Achilles Library is a research library originally built on the collections of books and papers of founder Gertrude Vanderbilt Whitney, and the Whitney Museum's first director, Juliana Force. The library operates in the West Chelsea area of New York City. It contains Special Collections and the Whitney Museum Archives. The archives contain the Institutional Archives, Research Collections, and Manuscript Collections. The Special Collections consist of artists' books, portfolios, photographs, titles in the Whitney Fellows Artist and Writers Series (1982–2001), posters, and valuable ephemera that relate to the permanent collection. The Institutional Archives include exhibition records, photographs, curatorial research notes, artist's correspondence, audio and video recordings, and trustees' papers from 1912 to the present.

Highlights:

- Arshile Gorky research collection, 1920s–1990s
- Edward Hopper research collection, 1894–2000

Books and materials in the library can be accessed in the museum's database.

== Independent Study Program ==
The Whitney Independent Study Program (ISP) was founded in 1968 by Ron Clark. The Whitney ISP has helped start the careers of artists, critics, and curators including Jenny Holzer, Andrea Fraser, Julian Schnabel, Kathryn Bigelow, Roberta Smith, and Félix González-Torres, as well as many other well-known cultural producers. The program includes both art history and studio programs. Each year, the ISP selects 14–16 students for the Studio Program (artists), 3–4 for the Curatorial Program (curators) and 6–7 for the Critical Studies Program (scholars and researchers). It is a nine-month program that includes both visiting and hired artists, art historians, and critics, and involves the reading of theory. Clark retired in 2023 and Gregg Bordowitz was selected as his replacement.

In October 2018, the ISP celebrated its 50th anniversary. The event took place over two days, from Friday, October 19, to Saturday, October 20, 2018, and featured a series of panels and talks focused on critical theory, contemporary art, and cultural critique. The first day began with the panel "(Re)constructing Histories," featuring Nora Alter, Naomi Beckwith, Emily Jacir, Tom McDonough, and Sadia Shirazi, moderated by Kenneth White. This was followed by a talk by Hal Foster. After a midday break, the panel "Institution and Its Discontents" included presentations by Huey Copeland, Rosalyn Deutsche, Andrea Fraser, Hans Haacke, and Fred Wilson, moderated by Alex Alberro. Johanna Burton delivered a talk following the panel. The evening concluded with the panel "Pedagogy and Critical Practice," which brought together Emily Apter, Gregg Bordowitz, Eva Diaz, Mary Kelly, and Devin Kenny, moderated by Trista Mallory.

The second day opened with the panel "Media and Its Apparatuses," featuring Anthony Cokes, Jonathan Crary, LaToya Ruby Frazier, Laura Mulvey, and Ben Young, moderated by Soyoung Yoon. This was followed by a talk from Jennifer A. Gonzalez. After a short break, Sharon Hayes gave a talk, leading into the final panel, "Activism and Critique," which featured David Harvey, Chantal Mouffe, Martha Rosler, and Gayatri Spivak, moderated by Cassandra Guan. A number of participants, marked with an asterisk in the original program, were regular seminar leaders and visiting faculty.

=== Notable alumni ===
==== 1960s ====
- Power Boothe — Fall 1967; Spring 1968
- Dona Nelson — Spring 1968
- Roberta Smith — 1968–1969

==== 1970s ====
- Roger Welch — 1970–1971
- Bryan Hunt — 1971–1972
- Kathryn Bigelow — 1971–1972
- Carole Ann Klonarides — 1972–1973
- Charlie Ahearn — 1972–1973
- Edit DeAk — 1972–1973
- John Newman — 1972–1973
- Michael Smith — 1972–1973
- Walter Robinson — 1972–1973
- Coleen Fitzgibbon — 1973–1974
- Julian Schnabel — 1973–1974
- Richard Armstrong — 1973–1974
- Tom Otterness — 1973–1974
- Carrie Rickey — 1975–1976
- Jeanette Ingberman — 1975–76
- Judith Bernstein — 1975–1976
- David Bates — 1976–1977
- Dike Blair — 1976–1977
- Jenny Holzer — 1976–1977
- Katharina Sieverding — 1976–1977
- Lisa Phillips — 1976–1977
- Michael Kessler — 1976–1977
- Susan Daitch — 1976–1977
- James Casebere — 1977–1978
- John Miller — 1977–1978
- William Pope.L — 1977–1978
- Laura Kipnis — 1978–1979
- Julia Wachtel — 1978–1979
- Jon Kessler — 1979–1980

==== 1980s ====
- Félix González-Torres — 1980–1981
- Shelly Silver — 1980—1981
- Yong Soon Min — 1980–1981
- Jack Bankowsky — 1981–1982
- Laura Cottingham — 1981–1982
- Andrea Fraser — 1983–1984
- Tony Cokes — 1983–1984
- Ashley Bickerton — 1984–1985
- Glenn Ligon — 1984–1985
- Jason Simon — 1984–1985
- Mark Dion — 1984–1985
- Gregg Bordowitz — 1985–1986
- Madeleine Grynsztejn — 1985–1986
- Marianne Weems — 1985–1986
- Rirkrit Tiravanija — 1985–1986
- Zoe Beloff — 1985–1986
- Peter Doroshenko — 1986–1987
- Sarah Pirozek — 1987–1988
- Tom Burr — 1987–1988
- Tom Kalin — 1987–1988
- Catherine Gund — 1988–1989
- Claire Pentecost — 1988–1989
- Gavin Brown — 1988–1989
- Miwon Kwon — 1988–1989
- Jayce Salloum — 1988–1989
- Moyra Davey — 1988–1989
- Helen Molesworth — 1989–1990
- Renée Green — 1989–1990
- Sarah Morris — 1989–1990

==== 1990s ====
- Rainer Ganahl — 1990–1991
- Pamela M. Lee — 1990–1991
- Laylah Ali — 1991–1992
- Natalie Bookchin — 1991–1992
- Johan Grimonprez — 1992–1993
- Jutta Koether — 1992–1993
- Ken Gonzales-Day — 1992–1993
- Lyle Ashton Harris — 1992–1993
- Mariko Mori — 1992–1993
- Michael Richards — 1992–1993
- Renee Cox — 1992–1993
- Al-An deSouza — 1993–1994
- Carlos Basualdo — 1994–1995
- George Baker — 1994–1995
- Jason Middlebrook — 1994–1995
- Mungo Thomson — 1994–1995
- David Černý — 1995–1996
- Fatimah Tuggar — 1995–1996
- Nina Katchadourian — 1995–1996
- Maria Lind — 1995–1996
- Cameron Martin — 1995–1996
- Candice Breitz — 1996–1997
- Ho Tam — 1996–1997
- J. Yolande Daniels — 1996–1997
- Matthew Buckingham — 1996–1997
- Javier Téllez — 1997–1998
- Paul Pfeiffer — 1997–1998
- Jennifer Allora — 1998–1999
- Eva Díaz — 1998–1999
- Emily Jacir — 1998–1999
- Gerard Byrne — 1998–1999
- Ellen Harvey — 1998–1999
- Jan Baracz — 1998–1999
- Raul Zamudio — 1998–1999
- Andrea Geyer — 1999–2000
- Sharon Hayes — 1999–2000
- Ashley Hunt — 1999–2000
- Senam Okudzeto — 1999–2000
- Bettina Pousttchi — 1999–2000
- Valerie Tevere — 1999–2000

==== 2000s ====
- Clifford Owens — 2000–2001
- Elia Alba — 2000–2001
- Emily Roysdon — 2000–2001
- Lana Lin — 2000–2001
- Angel Nevarez — 2001–2002
- Carissa Rodriguez — 2001–2002
- Oscar Tuazon — 2001–2002
- Rajkamal Kahlon — 2001–2002
- Gardar Eide Einarsson — 2002–2003
- H. Lan Thao Lam — 2002–2003
- K8 Hardy — 2002–2003
- Mai-Thu Perret — 2002–2003
- Naomi Beckwith — 2002–2003
- Ulrike Müller — 2002–2003
- Melanie Gilligan — 2004–2005
- Narcissister — 2004–2005
- Sam Lewitt — 2004–2005
- Xaviera Simmons — 2004–2005
- Carlos Motta — 2005–2006
- Christiane Paul — 2005–2007
- Emily Sundblad — 2005–2006
- Ryan Humphrey — 2005–2006
- Victoria Fu — 2005–2006
- Jane Jin Kaisen — 2007–2008
- Meleko Mokgosi — 2007–2008
- Sean Raspet — 2007–2008
- Sreshta Premnath — 2007–2008
- Heather Hart — 2008–2009

==== 2010s ====
- Jacqueline Hoang Nguyen — 2010–2011
- LaToya Ruby Frazier — 2010–2011
- Hương Ngô — 2011–2012
- Adelita Husni-Bey — 2012–2013
- David Birkin — 2012–2013
- Nitasha Dhillon — 2012–2013
- Allison Janae Hamilton — 2013–2014
- Danielle Dean — 2013–2014
- Hannah Black — 2013–2014
- Aliza Shvarts — 2014–2015
- Devin Kenny — 2014–2015
- Maura Brewer — 2014–2015
- Damali Abrams — 2015–2016
- American Artist — 2016–2017
- Eliza Myrie — 2019–2020

== Governance ==
=== Funding ===
As of March 2011, the Whitney's endowment was $207 million; the museum expected to raise $625 million from its capital campaign by 2015. As of June 2016, the endowment had grown to $308 million.

Historically, the operating performance has been essentially breakeven. The museum restricts the use of its endowment fund for yearly operating expenses to 5% of the fund's value. The Whitney has historically depended on private collectors and donors for acquisitions of new art. In 2008, Leonard A. Lauder gave the museum $131 million, the biggest donation in the Whitney's history. Donations for new purchases dropped to $1.3 million in 2010 from $2.7 million in 2006.

=== Directors ===
The museum's director is Scott Rothkopf (since 2023). Former directors include Adam D. Weinberg (2003–2023), Maxwell L. Anderson (1998–2003), David A. Ross (1991–1997), Thomas Armstrong III (1974–1990), John I. H. Baur (1968-1974), Lloyd Goodrich (1958-1968), Hermon More (1948-1958), and Juliana Force (1931–1948).

=== Board of trustees ===
For years, Gertrude Vanderbilt Whitney supported the museum single-handedly, as did her daughter, Flora Whitney Miller, after her, and until 1961, its board was largely family-run. Flora Payne Whitney served as a museum trustee, then as vice president. From 1942 to 1974, she was the museum's president and chair, after which she served as honorary chair until her death in 1986. Her daughter Flora Miller Biddle served as president until 1995. Her book The Whitney Women and the Museum They Made was published in 1999.

In 1961, the need for outside support finally forced the board to add outside trustees, including bankers Roy Neuberger and Arthur Altschul. David Solinger became the Whitney's first outside president in 1966.

== See also ==
- Whitney Museum of American Art (original building)
- List of museums and cultural institutions in New York City
- List of Whitney Biennial artists
- Whitney Biennial
- The Catalog Committee
