= Ho Tam (artist) =

Canadian visual artist

- Born: 1962 (age 63–64); Hong Kong
- Education: McMaster University, Bard College
- Known for: artist's books, video, photography, graphic design
- Website: https://www.ho-tam.com/

Ho Tam (b. 1962) is a Canadian visual artist whose practice spans video, photography, graphic design, painting, and print media. His work has been exhibited in public and alternative galleries across Canada and internationally. As part of his art practice, Tam edits and publishes artist's books. He is the founder and operator of several small presses, including hotam press, 88Books, and XXXzines. Tam's work is concerned with mass media representations of race and sexuality. He is based in Vancouver, Canada.

== Biography ==
Tam was born in Hong Kong. He holds a Bachelor of Arts from McMaster University and a Master of Fine Arts from Bard College. He was also a participant of the Whitney Museum Independent Studies Program. At McMaster, Tam studied economics and social work. While doing a field placement at a community psychiatric facility, he was exposed to art through participating in an art therapy class. Later, Tam became involved in commercial advertising, which sparked his interest in playing with the "tactics" of advertising.

Tam's first artist book, The Yellow Pages (1993), addressed visual stereotypes of Asian and Chinese identities in North American media. It was subsequently adapted into a video installation at Union Station (Toronto) in 1994–1995. The video was to put "the Chinese back into the train station since the history of the railroad is so linked to the first Chinese labour importation into Canada and the US." In 2007, the video was included as part of the "Redress Express" exhibition and symposium at Centre A: Vancouver International Centre for Contemporary Asian Art in Vancouver, organized by Montreal-based art historian Alice Ming Wai Jim and again in 2022 in the Living Room exhibition. The artist book was updated in 2016 and displayed in Tam's solo exhibition at Paul Petro Contemporary Art in Toronto in 2020. The exhibit showed other works made between 1993 and 2020 which similarly addresses media stereotypes of racialized subjects, including a commentary on Black Lives Matter in Tam's most recent project. Some notable international exhibitions that Tam has taken part in include "Magnetic North: Canadian Experimental Video," a book and screening series produced by the Walker Art Center in 2001, "Spectrosynthesis – Asian LGBTQ Issues and Art Now" at the Museum of Contemporary Art Taipei in 2017, as well as "Myth Makers – Spectrosynthesis III" at Hong Kong's Tai Kwun in 2022.

Tam's works reside in the permanent collections of museums across Canada, including Art Gallery of Ontario, National Gallery of Canada, and Vancouver Art Gallery. Additionally, his artist books can be found in libraries at the Metropolitan Museum of Art, the Museum of Modern Art, as well as the Whitney Museum of American Art.

== Awards ==
In 2006, Tam directed and produced a documentary feature called The Book of James, about the AIDS activist and filmmaker James Wentzy. The film won Best Documentary Feature at TLVFest and Special Programming Award for Outstanding Artistic Achievement at Outfest in Los Angeles.
