= Monadnock Lifetime Products =

Monadnock Lifetime Products, Inc.
- Company type: Private
- Industry: Defensive weapons
- Founded: Fitzwilliam, New Hampshire, United States (1958)
- Headquarters: Pittsfield, MA, USA
- Products: Tactical batons
- Parent: Safariland
- Website: batons.com

Monadnock Lifetime Products, Inc. is a weapons manufacturer providing equipment to law enforcement and private security companies since 1958. Monadnock produce several models of police baton. The company is a subsidiary under Safariland, LLC.

== Company products ==
Monadnock manufactures several types of police baton, including traditional straight batons, long riot sticks, side-handle nightsticks including the PR-24, and both friction-locking and mechanically locking telescoping batons.
