= Decolonize This Place =

Decolonial movement

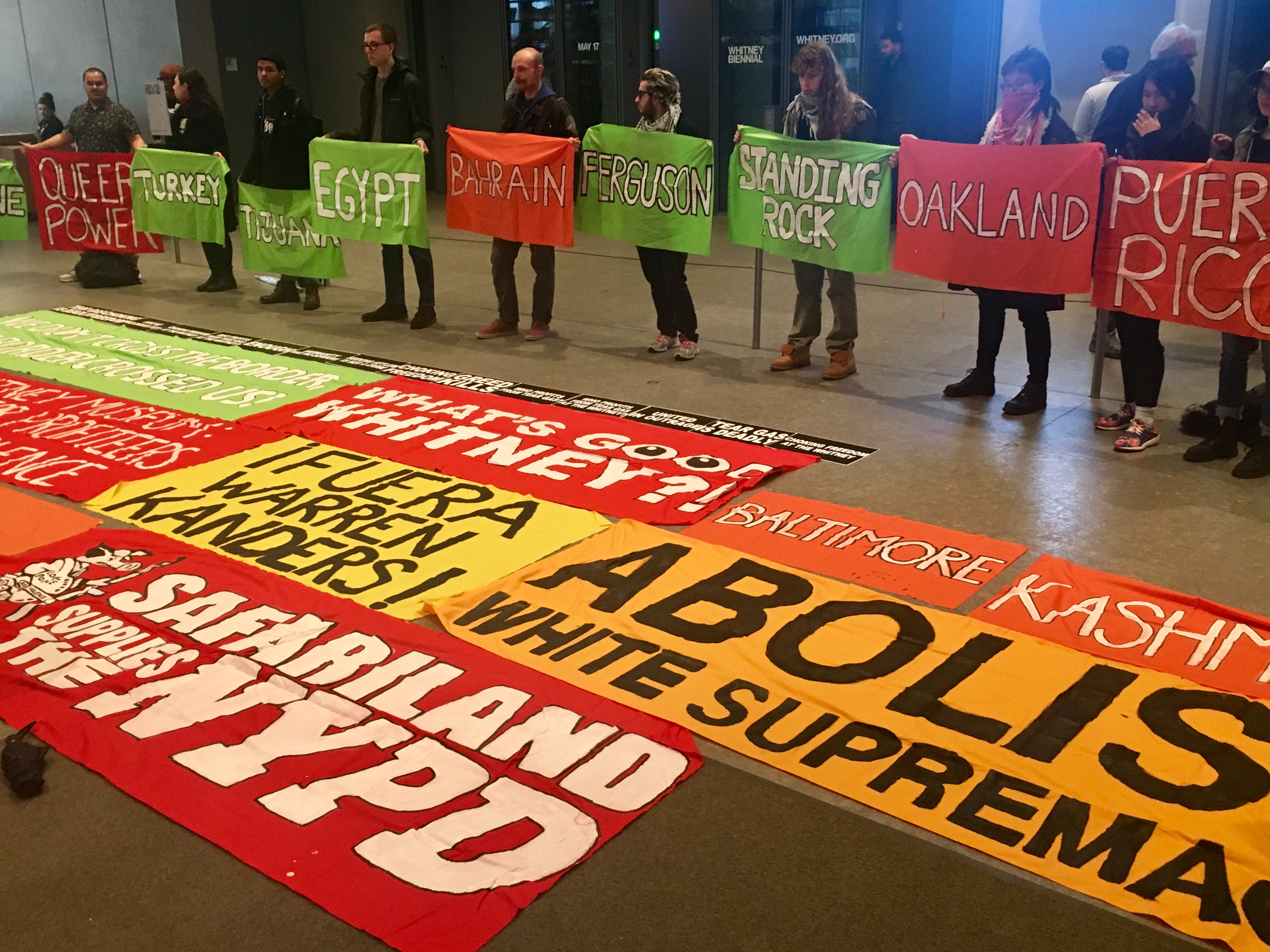
- April 5, 2019 protest by Decolonize This Place at the Whitney Museum, New York NY, over board vice chair Warren Kanders' ownership of Safariland, a manufacturer of tear gas and other weapons.
- Date: 2016 to present
- Location: New York, NY
- Caused by: Indigenous rights, Black nationalism, Palestinian nationalism, economic inequality, gentrification, patriarchy

Decolonize This Place is an art collective based in New York City that organizes around Indigenous rights, Black nationalism, Palestinian nationalism, de-gentrification, and economic inequality. Their actions often take place at museums and cultural institutions and focus on claimed colonialist tendencies within the art world.

== History ==
Decolonize This Place emerged from an action at the Brooklyn Museum in May 2016, under the auspices of Decolonial Cultural Front which targeted two museum exhibitions that some have argued normalized the displacement of Palestinians and Brooklynites alike. An Autumn 2016 residency at Artists Space allowed for the organization to articulate its framework linking various global issues, for example, activism connecting Indigenous rights and people of color generally with the Palestinian Israeli conflict. The closing event of this residency, on December 17, 2016, was marred by an assault on four activists leaving the event by self-proclaimed supporters of Donald Trump.

== Leadership ==
Decolonize This Place is facilitated by the MTL+ Collective. "Facilitation" has been repeatedly used by the MTL+ Collective to describe their role in this work.

MTL, the group at the core of MTL+, consists of Amin Husain and Nitasha Dhillon, who have collaborated as a collective on research, organizing, and action in art practice. Dhillon is a mathematician and artist who attended the Whitney Independent Study Program and the School of the International Center of Photography. Husain is a lawyer who studied photography at the International Center of Photography and works as an artist, community activist, and adjunct instructor at New York University.

== Activism ==
=== American Museum of Natural History ===
Since 2016, Decolonize This Place has organized an Indigenous Peoples Day/Anti-Columbus Day tour of the American Museum of Natural History in New York City. Initial demonstrations on October 10, 2016 brought forward a series of demands under the slogan of "Rename, Remove, Respect," calling for a renaming of Columbus Day as Indigenous Peoples' Day, removal of the Theodore Roosevelt statue at the museum's entrance, and renovation of several museum exhibitions with the consultation of curators who are representatives of the communities depicted in the exhibitions. Demands at the 2018 event repeated earlier requests, including removal of the statue of Theodore Roosevelt and the creation of a Decolonization Commission to assess the impact of stereotypes depicted in artistic works.

In 2019, following the news that the Brazilian-American Chamber of Commerce had rented out space in the museum for a gala to honor Brazil's president Jair Bolsonaro, Decolonize This Place issued a statement on Instagram denouncing this use of museum space and promising protests if the event was not canceled.

=== Brooklyn Museum ===
Decolonize This Place has organized events on Columbus Day at the Brooklyn Museum. Actions in 2018 around the Brooklyn Museum, both in April and October, have been organized around decolonization in response to the recent hiring of Kristen Windmuller-Luna as consulting curator for African art. An open letter was sent to the Brooklyn Museum from Decolonize This Place criticizing this hiring decision and highlighting it as proof of the disconnect between the museum and its surrounding community.

=== Whitney Museum ===
In December 2018, Decolonize This Place organized an action at the Whitney Museum to protest Board vice-chairman Warren Kanders' ownership of Safariland, the manufacturer of tear gas used against members of one of the late 2018 migrant caravans along the US-Mexico border.

In response to plans for the 2019 Biennial, Decolonize This Place launched nine weeks of protests beginning March 22, 2019, calling for the removal of Kanders from the museum's Board. After eight artists left the program in solidarity with the protests, Kanders resigned his position on July 25.

=== Subway protests ===
In the fall of 2019, the New York Metropolitan Transportation Authority announced a crackdown on fare evasion in the subway, adding 500 NYPD officers to enforce the measure. Decolonize This Place organized a protest in response, focused on the presence of police in the subway and calling for free transit in the face of declining service. Around one thousand protesters marched through the streets and later staged a mass fare evasion, jumping turnstiles and holding open emergency gates in several stations in Downtown Brooklyn.

== Criticism ==
In 2016, Husain gave a speech on Palestinian liberation at an Al-Quds Day celebration in Times Square in which he advocated fighting for "justice in all the ways possible – and yes, Jihadis – Jihadis in all the ways possible... don’t let anyone tell you to renounce your brother or sister because they are fighting in an unacceptable way." Several news sources published articles calling-out the group for inciting violence.

Nigerian-American art historian and curator Okwui Enwezor criticized the movement's objection to the hiring of curator Kristen Windmuller-Luna, a former student of Enwezor, as "arbitrary at best, and chilling at worst."

== See also ==
- Indigenous Decolonization
- Liberate Tate
- P.A.I.N.
- Actions against memorials in Great Britain during the George Floyd protests
- Décolonisation de l'espace public (fr)
