= Warren Kanders =

American businessman and investor

- Born: 1957 or 1958 (age 67–68); New Jersey, U.S.
- Education: Brown University
- Occupations: Businessperson and investor

Warren Beatty Kanders (born 1957 or 1958) is an American businessman and investor. From 1996 to 2007, he was chairman of Armor Holdings, a company involved in the defense and law enforcement industries. He has been chairman and CEO of Cadre Holdings since 2012.

An arts patron, Kanders joined the board of the Whitney Museum, in New York, in 2006. He resigned as vice chair in 2019 following protests over sales of tear gas by Safariland, a subsidiary of Cadre Holdings.

== Early life ==
Warren Beatty Kanders was born in 1957 or 1958 to Jeanne and Ralph Kanders. His father worked as a periodontist in Montclair and Convent Station New Jersey. He studied at the Choate School, a prestigious boarding school in Connecticut, and earned a bachelor's degree at Brown University in Rhode Island.

== Business career ==
=== Finance ===
Kanders first worked in mergers and acquisitions at the investment firm Morgan Stanley, and then in the 1980s was employed by the New York firm Oppenheimer & Company in the same line of work. He also worked for Canadian businessman Jim Pattison. Since 1990, he is the owner and president of a Connecticut-based investment firm, Kanders & Company.

=== Retail ===
Kanders was one of two bankers who created Benson Eyecare in 1992 from the merger of shell public company Ehrlich Bober, an optical retail chain and Benson Optical, which was acquired from the pension fund of General Electric for $2.3 million. Benson Eyecare relisted from the American Stock Exchange to the New York Stock Exchange (NYSE), and Martin E. Franklin served as its CEO, making Franklin the youngest CEO of a corporation listed on the NYSE. Through a series of acquisitions and organic growth, Benson Eyecare grew from $40 million in annualized revenue in 1992 to $150 million in 1996, when the company was sold to Essilor for $300 million, creating a 23-fold return for early investors. Forbes estimated that Kanders received more than $30 million from the transaction.

=== Defense and law enforcement ===
Kanders spent $3 million of his $30 million profit to buy 70% of the Florida-based American Body Armor, a company which was a predecessor to Armor Holdings, a manufacturer of body armor equipment and provides security services. Armor initially focused on customers in municipal governments and the private sector. It acquired Safariland, a policing equipment manufacturer, in 1999, and shortly before the September 11 attacks in 2001, Kanders predicted that "there would be more friction" in the world and the company acquired O'Gara-Hess & Eisenhardt, which provided the armoring for military Humvees. The company armored 51 Humvees each month in 2003. The company had made 28 acquisitions by 2006 and had gone public; Forbes wrote that Kanders and Robert Schiller, the CEO, had converted Armor into a "prime military contractor". He was chairman of Armor Holdings from 1996 until 2007, when Armor Holdings was bought by BAE Systems for $4.1 billion in 2007. Kanders received a $300 million payout as a result of the purchase.

Kanders began an effort in 2008 to become CEO of the Federal Signal Corporation after announcing he held a 5.7% stake in the company. He also criticized the company for the sale of a subsidiary and later publicly alleged that its chairman of "may have been involved in a coverup of insider trading". In response to the allegation, the company said that it was "nothing more than another desperate attempt to undermine the credibility of the company's highly qualified board of directors". Also in 2008, Kanders bought outdoor equipment manufacturer Gregory Mountain Products, which was part of Armor Holdings when it was purchased by BAE Systems. Kanders and Schiller were managers at Clarus Corporation, based in Connecticut, when in 2010, it purchased Gregory Mountain Products and the Utah-based Black Diamond Equipment, for a combined $135 million. Following the deal, the two companies were combined into one company, named Black Diamond, with Kanders as executive chairman. Kanders returned to Safariland as its chairman and CEO after its purchase from BAE Systems for $124 million in 2012.

Forbes estimated his net worth at $700 million in 2018, mostly derived from Safariland's value. In 2021, the parent company of Safariland, Cadre Holdings, announced that it was going public, with Kanders remaining as CEO and maintaining a 51% voting interest.

== Arts patronage and protests ==
Kanders joined the board of the Whitney Museum in New York in 2006. Kanders and his wife, Allison, redesigned their house in Greenwich, Connecticut, in 2013 to incorporate their collection of contemporary art; they owned works by John Baldessari, Jeff Koons, Gerhard Richter, and Cindy Sherman. The New York Times in 2019 reported that Kanders donated more than $10 million to the Whitney Museum, among donations to "various charities" and Republican and Democratic Party politicians.

The couple endowed $2.5 million to the Aspen Music Festival and School in Colorado in 2016. They were major donors to the Aspen Art Museum for 2017 to 2018, and his wife was a board member in 2018.

=== Whitney Museum protests ===
Kanders was listed as a "significant contributor" to the Whitney Museum's retrospective exhibition on Andy Warhol on November 12, 2018. By this time, he was vice chairman of the board. An article in Hyperallergic magazine later that month connected Kanders to tear gas canisters thrown at the San Diego–Tijuana border which, according to journalist Patrick Timmons, were shown on photos to be labeled with the Safariland logo. The magazine previously reported on Kanders in 2015, connecting his arts patronage to riot gear sold by the company. In response to the article, around 100 museum employees signed an open letter asking the museum to request Kanders's resignation as they did not feel as though they could work at the museum while a defense contractor was on its board. Museum director Adam D. Weinberg responded to the letter, but did not specifically address Kanders or the request for his resignation, while Kanders released a statement in which he said he could provide facts about his company to facilitate "a more informed and constructive dialogue".

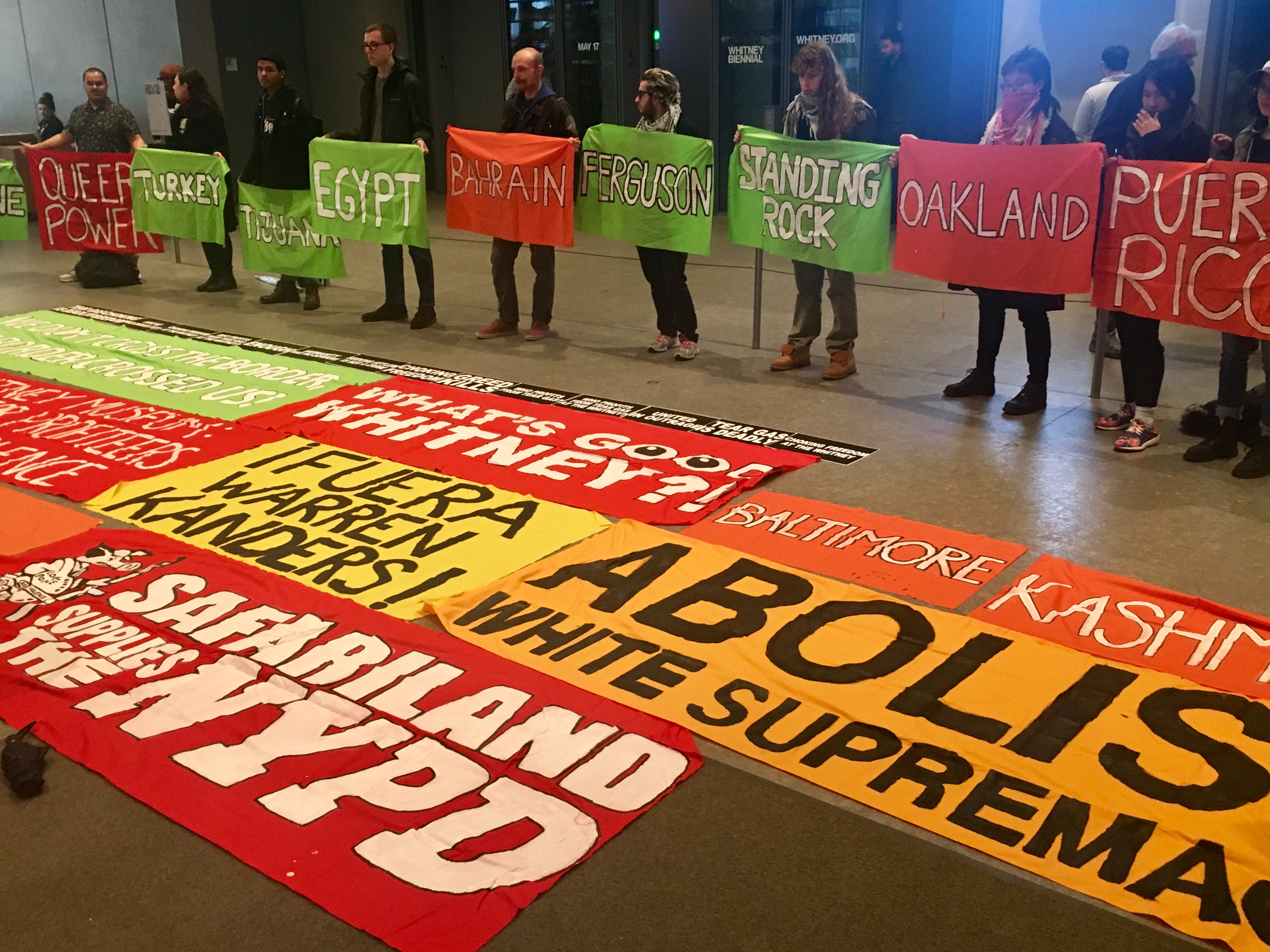
Decolonize This Place protestors in the lobby of the Whitney Museum with banners demanding Kanders's removal from the museum board in 2019

In December, the group Decolonize This Place organized a protest at the museum to protest Kanders's board membership. In response to plans for the 2019 Whitney Biennial, Decolonize This Place launched a series of nine weekly protests from March 22 to May 17, calling for his removal from the board, and around two-thirds of the 75 Biennial participants signed a letter authored by various art critics, academics, and other figures that called for the same goal. The New York Times reported that the protests had "reached a climax" during the opening of the Biennial, when a large tear gas sculpture was installed close to the entrance and protestors marched to Kanders's house in Greenwich Village. After eight artists left the program in solidarity with the protests, on July 25, Kanders resigned from his position and his wife left her position as co-chair of the painting and sculpture committee.

Kanders announced in 2020 that Safariland planned to divest itself of divisions producing "crowd-control solutions, including chemical agents, munitions and batons, to law enforcement and military agencies"—specifically Defense Technology and Monadnock Lifetime Products—amid criticism that tear gas sold by one of its divisions was used by police in protests over the murder of George Floyd. Despite earlier announcing that he would leave the industry, The Intercept reported in 2022 that Kanders was still profiting from his company's sales of tear gas. Defense Technology and Safariland reportedly remained registered as subsidiaries of Kanders' company Cadre Holdings.

=== Brown University protests ===
An op-ed in The Brown Daily Herald authored by four fellow Brown University alumni in February 2018 criticized the Institute at Brown for Environment and Society (IBES) for allowing Kanders on its advisory council as they alleged Safariland's products had been used to "suppress protests, maim or kill activists and intimidate social movements." Kanders defended Safariland's products in a letter to the editor. After protests by student groups, in October 2019, the university announced changes to its gift acceptance policy.

== Personal life ==
=== Family ===
Kanders married to Sarah Phillips in 1982. Following a divorce, he married Allison Smith in 1998. They have three children.

=== Real estate ===
Kanders bought a 20-acre Colonial Revival house in Greenwich around 1996. With his wife Allison, he had the property renovated by architect Oliver Cope and interior designer Mica Ertegun around 2001, and later had the interiors redesigned with contemporary art by designer Joe Nahem, from the firm Fox-Nahem Associates, around 2013. The couple purchased a townhouse in Greenwich Village, New York City, for $17.8 million in 2012. The New York and Connecticut homes were the sites of demonstrations in 2020 due to Safariland's past sales of tear gas; the Connecticut protest had some protestors affiliated with the Service Employees International Union.

They purchased the Palm Beach, Florida home of singer Jimmy Buffett and Buffett's wife for $6.9 million in 2020. A limited liability company (LLC) connected to Kanders purchased the Palm Beach home of businesswoman Adrien Arpel for $25.38 million in 2021. It was sold for $39.9 million the following year, in June 2022, after the town did not approve the plan of a new house that Kanders and his wife sought to build on the property. Later in June, Kanders's LLC purchased the Palm Beach home of Eugene Applebaum, founder of the Arbor Drugs drug stores, and Applebaum's wife for $56 million. Kanders and his wife donated "nearly $400,000" of equipment from his company Cadre Holdings to the Palm Beach police department the following year.

Kanders and his brother, Alan, an investor and hotel owner, became owners of the Mayflower Inn & Spa in Washington, Connecticut, with the property's foreclosure in 2010. Grace Hotels became a majority owner in 2013. In 2011, he was reported to be part owner of the Hotel Saint-Barths Isle de France on the Caribbean island of Saint Barthélemy.
