= Safariland =

American body armor manufacturer

Safariland, LLC
- Founded: 1964
- Founder: Neale Perkins
- Headquarters: Jacksonville, Florida
- Key people: Warren Kanders; (CEO)
- Products: Body armor, armor systems, tactical accessories, protective gear, "less-lethal" weapons
- Website: www.safariland.com

Safariland, LLC is a United States–based manufacturer of personal, and other equipment focused on the law enforcement, public safety, military, and recreational markets. It was formerly a division of the United Kingdom–based defense and aerospace company BAE Systems PLC. Safariland has said that their body armor has protected at least 2,040 police officers who were shot in the line of duty.

== History ==
The company was founded in Sierra Madre, California in 1964 by Neale Perkins, following his father's request for a custom holster. He named his new company after the African safaris he and his father took together.

In 1996, American Body Armor and its shareholders joined forces to form Armor Holdings, a diversified holding company with three manufacturing sites. Over 11 years, Armor Holdings acquired various brands in the law enforcement industry, including Safariland, which was acquired in 1996.

In July 2007, BAE Systems acquired Armor Holdings, renaming the Armor Holdings Products Group the BAE Systems Product Group, of which Safariland was a part. In August 2008, this division was renamed Safariland.

In May 2012, BAE Systems announced that Safariland would be sold to an acquisition vehicle affiliated with Kanders & Co., Inc.; sale was finalized at the end of July 2012 for US$124 million.

In March 2013, the company acquired Mustang Survival, a manufacturer of safety and survivability equipment targeting marine and aviation applications in the public safety, military and recreational markets.

Also in March 2013, Safariland established a presence in the EU through the acquisition of Arveka TGS UAB, a designer and manufacturer protective products and equipment, in Lithuania.

In September 2013, the company expanded into the explosive ordnance disposal market with the acquisition of Med-Eng, a manufacturer of bomb disposal suits, robots and specialized tools.

In October 2013, they entered the tactical communication market with the acquisition of Tactical Command Industries, Inc.

In January 2015, Safariland acquired Atlantic Tactical, the largest law enforcement equipment distributor in the northeastern United States. The company went on to make other acquisitions in the distribution channel starting in December 2015 with Lawmen's, headquartered in Raleigh, North Carolina and followed in March 2016 with the purchase of United Uniforms in western New York.

In June 2015, the company acquired VieVu LLC, a provider of body-worn cameras and digital evidence management software, a division which was subsequently sold in May 2018 to Axon Enterprise, Inc including a long term commercial partnership for the provision of holsters.

In September 2015, Safariland acquired a majority interest in Rogers Holster, a designer and manufacturer of holsters and accessory components, and completed the acquisition of the remainder of the equity interest by the end of 2015.

In January 2017, the company continued its international expansion with the acquisitions of Aegis Engineering/LBA in the UK and Pacific Safety Products, Inc. in Canada.

== Products ==
Safariland manufactures and distributes a wide range of safety and survivability equipment for the law enforcement, public safety, military and recreational markets, under a number of brands, each of which is tied to the Safariland corporate brand.

Products include body armor under the American Body Armor, Second Chance, and PROTECH brands; holsters, and duty gear under the Safariland and Bianchi brands; accessories under the Hatch and Monadnock, and other specialty brands; and less lethal products under the Defense Technology brand.

Through its acquisitions, Safariland provides explosive ordnance disposal products under the Med-Eng brand, marine and aviation products through Mustang, personal protective equipment through Aegis/LBA and PSP, and communications equipment under TCI.
