= List of Whitney Biennial curators =

This is a complete list of Whitney Biennial curators who have curated or are scheduled to curate the Whitney Biennial exhibitions at the Whitney Museum of American Art in New York City, United States. The Whitney Biennial began as an annual exhibition in 1932, the first biennial was in 1973.

== History ==
The Whitney Museum had a long history beginning in 1932 of having a large group exhibition of invited American artists every year called the 'Whitney Annual'. In the late sixties, it was decided to alternate between painting and sculpture, although by the 1970s the decision was to combine both together in a biennial. The first biennial was curated by a curatorial committee under direction of director John I. H. Baur. The 1975 Whitney Biennial, the first to credit curators with the show curation, acknowledged the five person curatorial team of John Hanhardt, Barbara Haskell, James Monte, Elke Solomon, and Marcia Tucker. The catalog additionally acknowledges how the curators' work was co-supported by a grant from the National Endowment for the Arts.

== Curators ==
Year	Curators/organizers	Affiliated curator(s) and advisor(s)
2026	Marcela Guerrero; Drew Sawyer	
2024	Chrissie Iles; Meg Onli	
2022	David Breslin; Adrienne Edwards	Gabriel Almeida Baroja, curatorial project assistant Margaret Kross, former senior curatorial assistant
2019	Jane Panetta; Rujeko Hockley	Film program guest curated by Maori Karmael Holmes, Matt Wolf, and Sky Hopinka.
2017	Christopher Y. Lew; Mia Locks	Co-curated film program with Aily Nash
2014	Stuart Comer; Anthony Elms; Michelle Grabner	
2012	Elisabeth Sussman; Jay Sanders	Co-curated film program with Thomas Beard and Ed Halter, co-founders of Light Industry
2010	Francesco Bonami; Gary Carrion-Murayari	
2008	Henriette Huldisch; Shamim M. Momin	Overseen by Donna De Salvo; advisors: Thelma Golden, Bill Horrigan, Linda Norden
2006	Philippe Vergne; Chrissie Iles	
2004	Chrissie Iles; Shamim M. Momin; Debra Singer	
2002	Lawrence Rinder	Chrissie Iles, curator of film and video Christiane Paul, curator of Internet-based art works Debra Singer, curator of performance and sound art
2000	Maxwell L. Anderson; Michael Auping; Valerie Cassel; Hugh M. Davies; Jane Farver; Andrea Miller-Keller; Lawrence R. Rinder	
1997	Lisa Phillips; Louise Neri	
1995	Klaus Kertess	
1993	Elisabeth Sussman	Associate curators: Lisa Phillips, John Hanhardt, and Thelma Golden
1991	Richard Armstrong; Richard D. Marshall; Lisa Phillips; John Hanhardt	
1989	Richard Armstrong; Richard D. Marshall; Lisa Phillips	With John Hanhardt choosing the artists in the film and video section.
1987	Richard Armstrong; Richard D. Marshall; Lisa Phillips	
1985	John Hanhardt; Barbara Haskell; Richard D. Marshall; Lisa Phillips; Patterson Sims	Richard Armstrong
1983	John Hanhardt; Barbara Haskell; Richard D. Marshall; Lisa Phillips; Patterson Sims	
1981	John Hanhardt; Barbara Haskell; Richard D. Marshall; Lisa Phillips; Patterson Sims	
1979	John Hanhardt; Barbara Haskell; Richard D. Marshall; Mark Segal; Patterson Sims	
1977	Barbara Haskell; Marcia Tucker	Patterson Sims, associate curator
1975	John Hanhardt; Barbara Haskell; James Monte; Elke Solomon; Marcia Tucker	
1973	Curatorial Committee	Under direction of director John I. H. Baur

== See also ==
- List of Whitney Biennial artists
