= Alex Jovanovich =

American artist, writer, and editor (born 1975)

- Born: 1975 (age 50–51); Hobart, Indiana, U.S.
- Education: School of the Art Institute of Chicago (BFA, 2003)
- Known for: Drawing; mixed media; slide projection

Alex Jovanovich is an American artist, writer, and senior editor at Artforum whose practice merges visual work and critical writing. He works in drawing, writing, and 35mm slide projection, and his work has been exhibited at such institutions as the Whitney Biennial.

== Early life and education ==
Jovanovich was born in 1975 in Hobart, Indiana. He received a BFA from the School of the Art Institute of Chicago in 2003.

== Career ==
=== Visual art ===
Untitled, 2014. Still from a 35 mm slideshow exhibited in the Whitney Biennial.

Jovanovich works primarily in 35 mm slide projection and drawing, in black-and-white, to address themes of love, spirituality, melancholy, and mourning. His drawings include his hand-lettered text amid disembodied human orifices, flowers, and leather straps.

He uses text in his work, both writing his own words and pulling from public-domain sources, including the Bible. Some works incorporate domestic objects such as cufflinks and diaper pins, which Jovanovich described as being blessed by a witch.

==== Critical reception ====
An Artforum review of Jovanovich's 2013 exhibition likened his work to a hypothetical collaboration between Christina Ramberg and Lee Bontecou, and noted how "shockingly sensitive" it is. His drawings have been described as "obsessively drawn works in ink and graphite reminiscent of some occult manual." The Village Voice noted the contrast between the name of a 2025 piece (I Fucked Your Dad Then Slit His Throat (WHITE FECES/SCUM CUNT)) and the "sheer graphic delight" of "delicately wrought fields of pencil lines complementing bold black ink designs".

Jovanovich's use of words in his art and skill as a writer were among the reasons he was selected for inclusion in the Whitney Biennial, part of curator Anthony Elms's stated goal to make the exhibition "a literary event."

==== Selected exhibitions ====
- 2013: "Some Poor Girls," Adds Donna, Chicago
- 2014: Whitney Biennial, Whitney Museum of American Art, New York; curated by Stuart Comer, Anthony Elms, and Michelle Grabner
- 2015: "Making a Scene: Objects for Performance," Museum of Arts and Design, New York
- 2018: FRONT International: Cleveland Triennial for Contemporary Art, Cleveland Museum of Art; curated by Michelle Grabner and Jens Hoffmann
- 2024: "If You Lived Here You Would...," Gingerbread House, Norway, Maine; with Valerie Hegarty, Adam Payne, and Michelle Grabner
- 2025–2026: "Actual Queers Kissing!" Elliott Templeton Fine Arts, New York; with David Carrino

=== Art criticism ===
Jovanovich is a senior editor at Artforum, where he contributes exhibition reviews, artist profiles, and art criticism. His writing includes profiles of such artists as Brigid Berlin, John Currin, Clarity Haynes, Gerard Malanga, and Peter McGough; and reviews of exhibitions at such museums as MassMOCA, SFMOMA, Tate Modern, and the Whitney, and such independent galleries as Gagosian, Invisible-Exports, Matthew Marks, and Pace.

He has also contributed essays and interviews to exhibition catalogs and artists' books, including:

- John Torreano: Dark Matters Everywhere – Paintings, Sculptures, and Prints (Carl Solway Gallery / Oddi, 2013), catalog essay
- Whitney Biennial 2014 (Whitney Museum of American Art / Yale University Press, 2014), in conversation with poet Dan Beachy-Quick
- Tabboo!: 1982–88 (Gordon Robichaux/Karma Books, 2021), interview with Stephen Tashjian
- Queer Love: Affection and Romance in Contemporary Art (Lehman College Art Gallery / La MaMa Galleria, 2023), catalog essay

== Personal life ==
Jovanovich is of Serbian Orthodox heritage. He lives and works in the Bronx.

He is openly gay. At age 10, Jovanovich saw Andy Warhol on The Love Boat and has described it as a formative experience, saying he saw in Warhol "something of myself" and "some glimmer of hope for a future."

== See also ==
- List of Whitney Biennial artists#2014
