= Carissa Rodriguez =

American artist

- Born: 1970 (age 54–55); New York, NY, U.S
- Education: Eugene Lang College (BA, 1994); Whitney ISP (2001)

Carissa Rodriguez (born 1970) is an American artist who lives and works in New York City.

== Artistic practice ==
Rodriguez' work investigates the relationship of the material and social conditions through which art is produced, reproduced, and consumed. Rodriquez works in a spectrum of materials from cinema to photography to sculpture. Often, her exhibitions present complex and at times personal narratives that investigate the dynamics in play between artist, audience, and institution. She was a core member of Reena Spaulings Fine Art, New York from 2004 to 2015.

== Exhibitions ==
=== Solo exhibitions ===
- 2009 - Cherchez La Ghost - New Jersey - Basel
- 2010 - Busque El Ghost - House of Gaga - Mexico City
- 2011 - Karma International - Art Basel Miami Beach
- 2012 - Carissa Rodriguez - Karma International - Zurich, Switzerland
- 2013 - La Collectionneuse - Front Desk Apparatus - New York, NY
- 2016 - I'm normal. I have a garden. I’m a person.” - CCA Wattis Institute for Contemporary Arts - San Francisco, CA - curated by Jamie Stevens
- 2018 - The Maid - SculptureCenter - Long Island City, NY - Curated by Ruba Katrib
- 2019 - Carissa Rodriguez: The Maid, Walker Art Center, Minneapolis, US
- 2020 - Carissa Rodriguez: The Maid, John Young Museum of Art, Honolulu, US
- 2021 - Carissa Rodriguez: The Maid, The Art Gallery, University of Hawai’i at Manoa (UHM), Hawaii, US

=== Group exhibitions ===
- ProBio, MoMA PS1, New York, NY (2013)
- Whitney Biennial, Whitney Museum, New York, NY (2014) - curated by Stuart Comer, Anthony Elms, and Michelle Grabner
- Whitney Biennial, Whitney Museum, New York, NY (2019) - curated by Rujeko Hockley and Jane Panetta

== Awards ==
- Foundation for Contemporary Arts - Grant to Artists - (2018)
