= Peter Schjeldahl bibliography =

List of published works of Peter Schjeldahl, American poet and art critic.

== Books ==
- Schjeldahl, Peter (1968). White country. New York: Corinth Books.
- — (1971). An adventure of the thought police. London: Ferry Press.
- — (1973). Dreams. New York: Angel Hair Books.
- — (1978). Since 1964 : new and selected poems. New York: Sun.
- — (1981). The brute : new poems. Los Angeles: Little Caesar Press.
- — (1990). The 7 Days art columns, 1988–1990. New York: Figures Press.
- — (1991). Wilson, MaLin (ed.). The hydrogen jukebox : selected writings of Peter Schjeldahl, 1978–1990. Berkeley: University of California Press.
- Thompson, Jon; Pier Luigi Tazzi & Peter Schjeldahl (1995). Richard Deacon. London: Phaidon.
- Schjeldahl, Peter & Marcia Tucker (1998). Liza Lou : essays. Santa Monica: Smart Art Press in association with the Santa Monica Museum of Art.
- Schjeldahl, Peter (2008). Let's see : writings on art from The New Yorker. New York: Thames & Hudson. ISBN 978-0-500-23845-5.
- — (4 June 2019). Hot, Cold, Heavy, Light, 100 Art Writings 1988–2018. Abrams Press. ISBN 978-1-4197-3438-0.

== Exhibition catalogs ==
- Larson, Philip; Schjeldahl, Peter (1974). De Kooning : drawings, sculptures : an exhibition organized by Walker Art Center, Minneapolis, March 10-April 21, 1974. New York: Dutton. ISBN 0-525-47376-9.
- Schjeldahl, Peter (1980). Jean Dubuffet : recent paintings, October 31-29 November 1980, the Pace Gallery. New York: Pace Gallery.
- Samaras, Lucas (1981). Chambers, Marlene (ed.). Samaras pastels : Denver Art Museum, October 3-December 27, 1981. Organized by Dianne Perry Vanderlip; essay by Peter Schjeldahl. Denver: Denver Art Museum. ISBN 0-914738-22-4.
- Bernal, Louis Carlos; et al. (1984). 10 photographers, Olympic images. Essay by Peter Schjeldahl. Los Angeles: Los Angeles Center for Photographic Studies. ISBN 0-914357-06-9. Exhibition held November 18, 1984 to January 6, 1985.
- Schjeldahl, Peter; Phillips, Lisa (1987). Cindy Sherman. New York: Whitney Museum of American Art. Exhibition at the Whitney Museum of American Art, July 9 to October 4, 1987.
- Edward Hopper : light years, October 1 to November 12, 1988. Essay by Peter Schjeldahl. New York: Hirschl & Adler Galleries. 1988. ISBN 0-915057-23-9.
- McAllister, Gerry (1989). Richard Bosman, gifts of the sea : Mandeville Gallery, University of California, San Diego, May 19 through June 25, 1989. Essay by Peter Schjeldahl. San Diego: The Gallery.
- Sobel, Dean (1991). Jackie Winsor. With essays by Peter Schjeldahl and John Yau. Milwaukee: Milwaukee Art Museum. Exhibition of the work of Jackie Winsor at the Milwaukee Art Museum, November 22, 1991 to January 19, 1992.
- Schjeldahl, Peter (1993). De Kooning and Dubuffet : the late works. New York: Pace Gallery.
- William Wegman. Essay by Peter Schjeldahl. Museo de Monterrey. 1993. Exhibition held at the Museo de Monterrey, October 14, 1993 – January 2, 1994.
- Demetrion, James T. (1993). Jean Dubuffet 1943–1963 : paintings, sculptures, assemblages : an exhibition. Essays by Susan J. Cooke, Jean Planque, and Peter Schjeldahl. Washington, D.C.: Hirshhorn Museum and Sculpture Garden in association with the Smithsonian Institution Press. ISBN 1-56098-298-5.
- Jenssen, Olav Christopher (1995). Olav Christopher Jenssen : Bilder 1990–1994. Text by Carsten Ahrens, Doris von Drathen and Peter Schjeldahl. Hannover: Kestner-Gesellschaft. Exhibition held at the Kestner-Gesellschaft Hannover, Nov. 26, 1994-Jan. 22, 1995
- Prelinger, Elizabeth; Parke-Taylor, Michael (1996). The symbolist prints of Edvard Munch : the Vivian and David Campbell collection. Essay by Peter Schjeldahl. New Haven, Conn.: Yale University Press. ISBN 0-300-06952-9. Exhibition at Art Gallery of Ontario, Toronto, 28 February-25 May 1997.
- Picasso's Dora Maar; de Kooning's women. Essay by Peter Schjeldahl. New York: C & M Arts. 1998. Catalog of an exhibition held at C & M Arts, New York, April 2-May 28, 1998.
- The inward eye : transcendence in contemporary art. Essays by Lynn M. Herbert, Klaus Ottmann, Peter Schjeldahl. Houston: Contemporary Arts Museum. 2001. ISBN 0-936080-71-X. Catalog of an exhibition held at Contemporary Arts Museum, Houston, Dec. 8, 2001-Feb. 17, 2002.

== Essays, reporting and other contributions ==
- Schjeldahl, Peter (1987). "Interview with David Salle". In Salle, David (ed.). Salle. New York: Vintage.
- Whitney, David, ed. (1988). Eric Fischl. Essay by Peter Schjeldahl. New York: Art in America/Stewart, Tabori & Chang.
- Schjeldahl, Peter (1998). "Splendor in the grass : Liza Lou and the cultivation of beauty". In Schjeldahl, Peter and Marcia Tucker (ed.). Liza Lou. Santa Monica: Smart Art Press in association with the Santa Monica Museum of Art. ISBN 1-889195-12-X.
- — (November 9, 1998). "Fairies welcome : the Victorians' use of enchantment". The Critics. The Art World. The New Yorker: 90–91, 93.
- Pagliaro, John, ed. (2003). Shards : Garth Clark on ceramic art. Foreword by Peter Schjeldahl. New York: Distributed Art Publications.
- Schjeldahl, Peter (November 3, 2008). "Just for fun". The Critics. The Art World. The New Yorker. 38 (35): 114–115.
- — (November 24, 2008). "Come on down". The Critics. The Art World. The New Yorker. 84 (38): 128–129.
- — (March 15, 2010). "Big time". The Critics. The Art World. The New Yorker. 86 (4): 71–75.
- — (April 5, 2010). "Revision quest". Goings on About Town. Critic's Notebook. The New Yorker. 86 (8): 16.
- — (April 19, 2010). "Picture perfect : an Henri Cartier-Bresson retrospective". The Critics. The Art World. The New Yorker. 86 (9): 122–123.
- — (May 24, 2010). "One man's feat". Goings on About Town. Critic's Notebook. The New Yorker. 86 (14): 9.
- — (November 8, 2010). "Abstract exemplar". Goings on About Town. Critic's Notebook. The New Yorker. 86 (35): 14.
- — (March 14, 2011). "Shapes of things". The Critics. The Art World. The New Yorker. 87 (4): 76–77.
- — (November 7, 2011). "By Georges". Goings on About Town. Critic's Notebook. The New Yorker. 87 (35): 12. Georges Braque at the Acquavella Galleries.
- — (November 7, 2011). "Old and new : the reopening of the Islamic wing at the Met". The Critics. The Art World. The New Yorker. 87 (35): 88–89.
- — (January 2, 2012). "The reign in Spain". The Critics. Books. The New Yorker. 87 (42): 74–77. Reviews Bailey, Anthony. Velázquez and The Surrender of Breda : the making of a masterpiece.
- — (November 26, 2012). "Time warp". The Critics. The Art World. The New Yorker. 88 (37): 82–83. 'Richard Artschwager!', a retrospective at the Whitney Museum of American Art.
- — (December 3, 2012). "Life lines : the art of Saul Steinberg". The Critics. Books. The New Yorker. 88 (38): 104–108.
- — (January 7, 2013). "Shapes of things". The Critics. The Art World. The New Yorker. 88 (42): 68–70.
- — (February 11–18, 2013). "Dream acts". The Critics. The Art World. The New Yorker. 89 (1): 112–113. Surrealism exhibition at the Morgan Library.
- — (March 4, 2013). "Heaven on Earth : Piero della Francesca at the Frick". The Critics. The Art World. The New Yorker. 89 (3): 66–68.
- — (March 18, 2013). "Clothes call". Goings on About Town. Critic's Notebook. The New Yorker. 89 (5): 8.
- — (March 18, 2013). "Flower power : a Jay DeFeo retrospective". The Critics. The Art World. The New Yorker. 89 (5): 82–83.
- — (April 22, 2013). "Song lines". Goings on About Town. Critic's Notebook. The New Yorker. 89 (10): 12. Elizabeth Peyton.
- — (April 22, 2013). "New Amsterdam : the city remakes its signature museums". The Critics. The Art World. The New Yorker. 89 (10): 109–111.
- — (May 6, 2013). "Poetic license". Goings on About Town. Critic's Notebook. The New Yorker. 89 (12): 10. Retrospective of Jane Freilicher at the Tibor de Nagy gallery.
- — (June 3, 2013). "The seething hell : portraying the Civil War". The Critics. The Art World. The New Yorker. 89 (16): 70–71.
- — (July 8–15, 2013). "Between the lines". Goings on About Town. Critic's Notebook. The New Yorker. 89 (20): 16.
- — (August 5, 2013). "Earth angel". Goings on About Town. Critic's Notebook. The New Yorker. 89 (23): 8. Kenneth Price retrospective at the Metropolitan Museum of Art.
- — (October 21, 2013). "Play time : the Carnegie International". The Critics. The Art World. The New Yorker. 89 (33): 106–107.
- — (November 4, 2013). "Writing on the wall : a Christopher Wool retrospective". The Critics. The Art World. The New Yorker. 89 (35): 108–109.
- — (December 2, 2013). "Views from the edge : an Isa Genzken retrospective". The Critics. The Art World. The New Yorker. 89 (39): 80–81.
- — (February 3, 2014). "The outlaw : the extraordinary life of William S. Burroughs". The Critics. Books. The New Yorker. 89 (47): 70–74.
- — (March 3, 2014). "Party lines : Futurism and Italian Fascism". The Critics. The Art World. The New Yorker. 90 (2): 80–81.
- — (March 17, 2014). "Get with it : the Whitney Biennial". The Critics. The Art World. The New Yorker. 90 (4): 76–77.
- — (March 24, 2014). "The Anti-Modernists : why the Third Reich targeted artists". The Critics. The Art World. The New Yorker. 90 (5): 96–97.
- — (May 12, 2014). "Mutual-admiration society : revisiting the eighties exchange between Germany and New York". Goings on About Town. Art. The New Yorker. 90 (12): 12.
- — (August 4, 2014). "Sharp focus : Christopher Williams's sophisticated pictures". The Critics. The Art World. The New Yorker. 90 (22): 72–73.
- — (October 20, 2014). "Local heroes : the Brooklyn Museum surveys recent art from the borough". Goings on About Town. Art. The New Yorker. 90 (32): 10.
- — (October 20, 2014). "Shapes of things : the radicalism of Matisse's cutouts". The Critics. The Art World. The New Yorker. 90 (32): 102–103.
- — (December 22–29, 2014). "The shape we're in : the timely sculpture of Rachel Harrison". The Critics. The Art World. The New Yorker. 90 (41): 68–75.
- — (February 9, 2015). "Change artist : the works of Piero di Cosimo". The Critics. The Art World. The New Yorker. 90 (47): 70–71.
- — (February 16, 2015). "A painting a day : On Karawa's extraordinary project". The Critics. The Art World. The New Yorker. 91 (1): 74–75.
- — (March 16, 2015). "Moving pictures : Plains Indian art at the Metropolitan Museum". The Critics. The Art World. The New Yorker. 91 (4): 86–87.
- — (April 20, 2015). "Telling the whole story : Jacob Lawrence's 'The Migration Series'". The Critics. The Art World. The New Yorker. 91 (9): 80–82.
- — (May 25, 2015). "Native soil : what Frida Kahlo cultivated". The Critics. The Art World. The New Yorker. 91 (14): 78–79.
- — (August 3, 2015). "Go figure : a Chelsea gallery surveys the weird in the wilds beyond New York". Goings on About Town. Art. The New Yorker. 91 (22): 8.
- — (August 3, 2015). "Shapes and colors : Stanley Whitney at the Studio Museum in Harlem". The Critics. The Art World. The New Yorker. 91 (22): 66–68.
- — (February 29, 2016). "Light heavyweights : a Swiss duo brings their carefree approach to the Guggenheim". Goings on About Town. Art. The New Yorker. 92 (3): 10.
- — (February 29, 2016). "We all scream : the unsung importance of Edvard Munch". The Critics. The Art World. The New Yorker. 92 (3): 74–75.
- — (March 21, 2016). "Laughter and anger : a David Hammons retrospective". The Critics. The Art World. The New Yorker. 92 (6): 86–88.
- — (June 20, 2016). "This is America : a Stuart Davis retrospective". The Critics. The Art World. The New Yorker. 92 (18): 82–83.
- — (November 7, 2016). "The better life : a Kerry James Marshall retrospective". The Critics. The Art World. The New Yorker. 92 (36): 78–79.
- — (December 19–26, 2016). "Of late : the Pace gallery zeroes in on the dark final years of an Abstract Expressionist". Goings on About Town. Art. The New Yorker. 92 (42): 27.
- — (January 30, 2017). "A woman's view : a Marisa Merz retrospective". The Critics. The Art World. The New Yorker. 92 (47): 72–73.
- — (February 27, 2017). "New lives : shows of work by Alexei Jawlensly and Vija Celmins". The Critics. The Art World. The New Yorker. 93 (2): 72–73.
- — (April 24, 2017). "The XX factor : women and abstract art". The Critics. The Art World. The New Yorker. 93 (10): 100–101.
- — (May 8, 2017). "Looking and seeing : a Louise Lawler retrospective". The Critics. The Art World. The New Yorker. 93 (12): 72–73.
- — (October 30, 2017). "Think big : Laura Owens explores what painting can do". Onward and Upward with the Arts. The New Yorker. 93 (34): 28–33.
- — (February 12–19, 2018). "Brotherhood : Francisco de Zurbarán's 'Jacob and His Twelve Sons'". The Critics. The Art World. The New Yorker. 94 (1): 102–103.
- — (April 2, 2018). "Living color : the bodies on display in the Met Breuer's sculpture show". The Critics. The Art World. The New Yorker. 94 (7): 92–93.
- — (January 7, 2019). "Abstract inflation : the canon in question at the Met". The Critics. The Art World. The New Yorker. 94 (43): 70–71.
- — (February 11, 2019). "'Lucio Fontana' : Met Breuer". Goings on About Town. Art. The New Yorker. 94 (48): 10.
- — (March 4, 2019). "Guesswork : Jasper Johns and Siah Armajani". The Critics. The Art World. The New Yorker. 95 (2): 64–65.
- — (May 20, 2019). "['Emo Jungle' by Josh Smith]". Goings on About Town. At the Galleries. The New Yorker. 95 (13): 14.
- — (May 27, 2019). "Not waving : the Whitney Biennial in an age of anxiety". The Critics. The Art World. The New Yorker. 95 (14): 70–71.
- — (June 3, 2019). "Of nature : Thomas Cole and Brice Marden in the Hudson Valley". The Critics. The Art World. The New Yorker. 95 (15): 68–69.
- — (December 23, 2019). "The art of dying". The New Yorker.
- — (September 21, 2020). "Waves of change : Goya and the art of survival". The Critics. Books. The New Yorker. 96 (28): 61–64.
- — (December 21, 2020). "The fix we're in : drawing through the pandemic". The Critics. The Art World. The New Yorker. 96 (41): 78–79.
- — (December 28, 2020). "What are artists for? The Constructionists, at MOMA". The Critics. The Art World. The New Yorker. 96 (42): 92–93.
- — (February 15–22, 2021). "Home goods : on loving the Frick". The Critics. The Art World. The New Yorker. 97 (1): 87–91.
- — (March 15, 2021). "'Albers and Morandi'". Goings on About Town. Art. The New Yorker. 97 (4): 5. Reviews the Josef Albers and Giorgio Morandi exhibition at the David Zwirner Gallery.
- — (April 5, 2021). "Life force : Niki de Saint Phalle at MOMA PS1". The Critics. The Art World. The New Yorker. 97 (7): 66–67.
- — (September 27, 2021). "[Untitled review of Philip Guston exhibition]". Goings on About Town. At the Museums. The New Yorker. 97 (30): 10.
