= Scott Rothkopf =

American art historian (born 1976)

- Born: 1976 (age 49–50); Dallas, Texas, United States
- Occupations: Art historian Curator

Academic background
- Education: Harvard University

Scott Rothkopf (born 1976 in Dallas) is an American art historian and curator. He became the Alice Pratt Brown Director of the Whitney Museum of American Art on November 1, 2023, previously serving as the senior deputy director and Nancy and Steve Crown Family Chief Curator.

== Early life and education ==
A native of Dallas, Rothkopf graduated from the Greenhill School in Addison, Texas. He obtained both his Bachelor of Arts in Art History in 1999, under Yve-Alain Bois, and graduate degree in the history of art and architecture from Harvard University.

He began his curatorial career at the Harvard University Art Museums, where he served as a guest curator of exhibitions devoted to the work of Mel Bochner (2002) and Pierre Huyghe (2004). In 2001, he began publishing reviews and feature articles for Artforum International, where he served as Senior Editor from 2004–2009.

== Career ==
From 2004 until 2009, Rothkopf was a senior editor of Artforum. He then joined the Whitney Museum of American Art as a curator. In 2015, Rothkopf was promoted to the role of Nancy and Steve Crown Family Chief Curator, replacing Donna De Salvo, and three years later, jointly as the senior deputy director.

While at the Whitney, Rothkopf has curated a number of exhibitions, including; "Mary Heilmann: Sunset" (2015), "Jeff Koons: A Retrospective" (2014 - the largest single artist exhibition in the Whitney's history and the closing show in the Museum's previous Marcel Breuer-designed Madison Avenue home space), "Sinister Pop" (2012–13, with Donna De Salvo), "Wade Guyton OS" (2012–13), Glenn Ligon: AMERICA (2011), "Singular Visions" (2010, with Dana Miller) and "Whitney on Site: Guyton\Walker" (2010).

In March 2023, the Whitney announced that Adam D. Weinberg would stand down as the Alice Pratt Brown Director at the end of his contract on October 31, 2023, and named Rothkopf as his successor.

== See also ==
- List of Harvard University people
- List of people from Dallas
