= Thomas N. Armstrong III =

American museum curator (1932–2011)

Thomas Newton Armstrong III
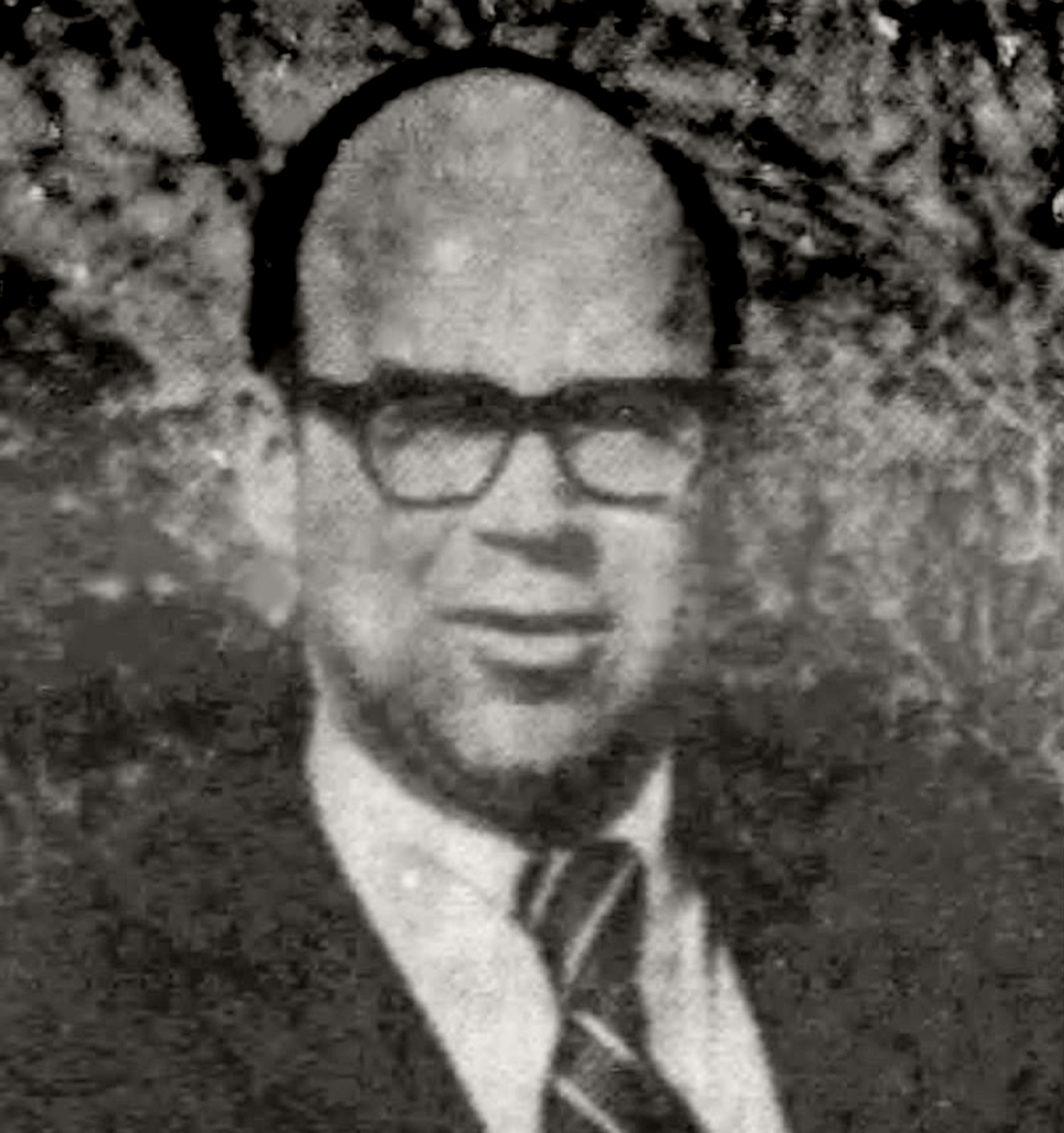
- Armstrong in 1970
- Born: July 30, 1932; Portsmouth, Virginia, United States
- Died: June 20, 2011 (aged 78); Manhattan, New York, United States
- Education: New York University Institute of Fine Arts
- Occupation: Museum director
- Organizations: Pennsylvania Academy of the Fine Arts; Whitney Museum of American Art; Andy Warhol Museum

Thomas Newton Armstrong III (July 30, 1932 – June 20, 2011), was an American museum curator. A graduate of Cornell University and the New York University Institute of Fine Arts, he began his career in Colonial Williamsburg as curator of the folk art collection at the Abby Aldrich Rockefeller Folk Art Museum from 1967 to 1971. He served as director of the Pennsylvania Academy of the Fine Arts (1971–1973), the Whitney Museum of American Art (1974–1990) and the Andy Warhol Museum (1993–1995). He is best known for significantly expanding the size of the collection at the Whitney Museum.

== Early life and career ==
The son of Thomas Newton Armstrong, Jr., Thomas Newton Armstrong III was born on July 30, 1932, in Portsmouth, Virginia. He grew up in Summit, New Jersey. He graduated from Cornell University in 1954 with a bachelor of fine arts degree in painting and sculpture, and was his class's valedictorian. At Cornell he was a member of the Quill and Dagger society. After college he served in the 25th Infantry Division of the United States Army in Hawaii; working in the artillery unit as a lieutenant from 1955 to 1956. He was employed as a coordinator for the engineering firm Stone & Webster in New York City after leaving military service; working for the company for eight years. He married Virginia Whitney Brewster in 1962. Together they raised a family of four children; having two daughters and two sons.

== Graduate school and first museum posts ==
In the mid 1960s Armstrong studied museum administration at the New York University Institute of Fine Arts (NYUIFA). While a graduate student at NYUIFA he attended a six-week long seminar for historical administrators held in Williamsburg, Virginia in the summer of 1966. The impression he made during this event led to his appointment as curator of the folk art collection at the Abby Aldrich Rockefeller Folk Art Museum (AARFAM) which he assumed on February 1, 1967, while still a student at NYUIFA. He was the first person to hold this curator position at the AARFAM.

By 1969 Armstrong had graduated from the NYUIFA with a master's degree having completed his degree while working for the AARFAM. He moved to Virginia in 1969. He concurrently worked as the president of the Twentieth Century Gallery (now the Williamsburg Contemporary Art Center), and as steward of the Collector's Circle at the Virginia Museum of Fine Arts (appointed in 1970). He remained at his position at the AARFAM until October 1971 when he assumed the post of director of the Pennsylvania Academy of the Fine Arts (PAFA) in Philadelphia.

At PAFA, Armstrong had responsibilities as director of both the school and museum components of the institution. He worked to establish an archives and research library, and improve the contemporary art collection (then non-existent) in the organization's holdings. His tenure was marked by the creation of an ambitious renovation plan of PAFA's facilities (not realized during his tenure), multiple successful fund raisers, and several innovative exhibitions which improved PAFA's national reputation. His renovation plan for the Historic Landmark Building at PAFA was successfully completed in 1976 after he left the institution, and he is credited as playing a pivotal role in the success of this project.

== Whitney Museum of American Art ==
In April 1973 it was announced that Armstrong would succeed John I. H. Baur as director of the Whitney Museum of American Art (WMAA) in New York City beginning on September 1, 1974. The positive press and achievements he had made at PAFA had a significant impact on his appointment to the WMAA. He remained at PAFA until October 1973 when he joined Whitney's staff to prepare for his transition into his role as director. In his first year as director of WMAA he befriended Andy Warhol when the artist crashed his 1974 Christmas party. He became a consistent champion of Warhol's works; mounting an exhibition of his portraits at WMAA in 1979 and initiating a collaborative project on Warhol's videos between WMAA and the Museum of Modern Art.

Armstrong's nearly sixteen year tenure at the WMAA was marked by a large expansion and broadening of the museum's collection. He oversaw the acquisition of thousands of works by American artists who made significant contribution to the progression of American art. The WMAA collection more than quadrupled in size under his leadership; growing from approximately 2,000 to 8,500 objects. Some of the notable acquisitions he oversaw included Frank Stella's Die Fahne Hoch! in 1977, Jasper Johns's Three Flags in 1980, and Alexander Calder's Cirque Calder in 1982. He was also influential in mentoring and assisting several curators who went on to have successful careers in the art world; among them Richard Armstrong, Barbara Haskell, Lisa Phillips, Jennifer Russell, and Adam D. Weinberg.

Despite these successes, Armstrong was criticized by some for not taking a more scholarly approach to the exhibitions at the WMMA. He was accused of being "overly trendy" in the Whitney Biennial exhibitions he organized; including his choice to feature the artists Eric Fischl, David Salle, Julian Schnabel, and Terry Winters relatively early in those artists' careers. His use of novice curators was also objected to by some in the art world, and occasionally created difficulties for Armstrong. He clashed with Marcia Tucker, a curator-in-training at Whitney, whom he fired in 1977 after she organized a poorly received exhibition of Richard Tuttle's work at WMAA. She rebounded immediately by founding the New Museum after this event. Art journalist Suzanne Muchnic stated the following about his WMAA tenure,

"Armstrong transformed the museum from a rather dowdy repository of rather unfashionable old art to what is perceived as a flashy showcase for young hot shots. But he has long been criticized for hiring young, inexperienced curators who have been said to have neglected the museum's permanent collection of early 20-century art in favor of frivolous contemporary exhibitions."

In the 1980s Armstrong led an ultimately fruitless campaign to add an addition onto the WMAA building designed by architect Michael Graves. The museum was in desperate need of more space in order to implement programs being demanded by the WMAA board, and Armstrong's expansion plan was designed with that in mind. However, his plans for a museum addition at WMAA were controversial, with the local community objecting to the demolition of adjacent brownstone buildings and the negative impact on the aesthetics of the existing WMAA building. He was dismissed by the WMAA board as director of the museum in March 1990.

== Andy Warhol Museum ==
After leaving WMMA he worked as an advisor to the National Gallery Prague. In January 1993 it was announced that Armstrong was appointed the director of the new Andy Warhol Museum (AWM) in Pittsburgh, Pennsylvania which was scheduled for a targeted opening in 1994. Originally Mark Francis was slated to be both director and curator, but it was determined the roles needed to be split into two jobs due to the size of the project. In April 1993 Armstrong moved to Pittsburgh where he lived with his with in the Park Mansions apartments near Carnegie Mellon University. He oversaw the development of the AWM, a part of the Carnegie Museums of Pittsburgh, leading up to its opening in May 1994.

Armstrong remained with the AWM until resigning with an effective date of March 1, 1995, at what was reported as an amicable resignation possibly triggered by the difficulty of raising funds. It was later revealed that he had conflicts with Ellsworth Brown who led the Carnegie Museums of Pittsburgh, and that the two men did not share the same vision for the AWM. His decision to resign was heavily influenced by his discord with Brown. He retired upon leaving AWM.

== Personal life ==
In 1973 Armstrong moved with his wife and four children to Fishers Island, New York where they initially lived in a rented cottage for 14 years. In 1987 they purchased an existing Georgian revival home on Fishers Island that was built in 1926. A lifelong gardener, Armstrong created a three acre garden at this property. He simultaneously grew tomatoes on the terrace outside his fifth floor office at the WMMA. He would sell them at a nearby produce stand on the sidewalk in Manhattan. He joined the board of The Garden Conservancy in 1991, and was later appointed chairman of that board in 1997.

In mid-December 2003 the Armstrong family's home on Fishers Island was destroyed in a fire. While the home was gone, the garden had survived, and the resulting unobstructed views of the land inspired Thomas to build a new home entirely made of glass that was designed by Thomas Phifer. His book, A Singular Vision on the design of his glass house on Fishers Island, New York, was published posthumously by WW Norton in fall 2011. He also served on the advisory committees of the Mount Vernon estate and Winterthur Museum & Country Estate, and was a trustee of the New York School of Interior Design. He was named an honorary trustee of the National Building Museum.

Armstrong died at the age of 78 in Manhattan on June 20, 2011. The cause was cardiac arrest.
