= Ellen Harvey =

American-British conceptual artist

- Born: 1967 (age 58–59); Farnborough, Kent, United Kingdom
- Education: Harvard College; Yale Law School
- Known for: Conceptual art, Painting, Installation art, Site-specific art, Public art, Institutional critique, Social practice
- Awards: John Simon Guggenheim Memorial Foundation, Wivina Demeester, Lily Auchincloss Foundation
- Website: Ellen Harvey

Ellen Harvey, New York Beautification Project (details), Forty 5" x 7" paintings in oil over graffiti, (2001).

Ellen Harvey (born 1967) is an American-British conceptual artist known for her painting-based practice and site-specific works in installation, video, engraved mirrors, mosaic and glass. She frequently pairs traditional representational vocabularies and genres (landscape, portraiture) with seemingly antithetical postmodern strategies, such as institutional critique, appropriation, mapping and pastiche. Her work examines such themes as art as a mirror, interactions between built environment and landscape, ruins and the Picturesque aesthetic, and cultural and economic relationships between museums, artists and publics. Curator Henriette Huldisch writes of her work, "haunted as it is by the notion of art's ultimate futility, her paradoxical stake is in persistently testing art's possibility to do something in the world after all."

Harvey has had solo exhibitions at the Whitney Museum at Philip Morris, Corcoran Museum of Art, Groeninge Museum and Barnes Foundation, and been featured in the Whitney, Prague and Kwangju Biennials, and shows at MoMA PS1, Turner Contemporary, the Aldrich Museum of Contemporary Art and SMAK. In 2016, she was awarded a Guggenheim Fellowship. She has been awarded public commissions in New York City, Chicago, Philadelphia, and San Francisco, and her 2016 Belgian project, Repeat, won the Wivina Demeester Prize for Commissioned Public Art. Her work has been the subject of several books, including The Unloved: Ellen Harvey (2014), Ellen Harvey: Museum of Failure (2015), New York Beautification Project (2005/2021), and Ellen Harvey: The Disappointed Tourist (2021). She lives with her husband and son in Brooklyn, New York.

== Early life and career ==
Harvey was born in 1967 in Farnborough, Kent, United Kingdom to German and British parents; her sisters are the poet Matthea Harvey and ecologist Celia Harvey. Her family lived throughout Europe, before moving to the United States when Harvey was in her teens. She attended Harvard College (AB, History and Literature, 1989) and the Hochschule der Künste, Berlin in Germany (1990, no degree), before earning a JD from the Yale Law School in 1993. After practicing law for three years and painting in her free time, she turned to art full-time, establishing herself in solo and group shows at the Stux and De Chiara galleries, Brooklyn Museum of Art, PS1, Art in General, and several international venues. She also completed the Whitney Museum's Independent Study Program and participated in PS1's National Studio Program.

Harvey's early work examined art production conventions and the public desire for representational art. She gained wide attention with her "New York Beautification Project" (1999–2001), which comprised 40 small, oval oil landscapes, illegally painted over graffiti-covered sites throughout New York City. Choosing what she called "anodyne images," she sought to investigate the criteria behind value judgments about art, including what is popular or offensive, and how an artist's demographic relates to privilege. In reviews, The New York Times described these works as "hit-and-run pastoral scenes" that were painted with "the tenderness, glowing light and overlapping greens of the Hudson River School" and "turn[ed] street art on its head."

== Work and reception ==
Ellen Harvey, Repeat (inside view), partially demolished church with terrazzo floor, 112' 2 3/8" x 53' 9 9/16", (2013).

Throughout her career, Harvey has cycled between diverse media and themes. Her work can be loosely organized into recurrent motifs: self-portraits and portraiture, museum and archive works, ruins, and landscapes and mappings.

=== Self-portraits and portraiture ===
Harvey's early figurative work explored the limits of representation, relationships between artist and public, memory, and the role or obsolescence of painting in a technological age. She often contrasted properties of painting (as labor-intensive, fallible, human, enduring) and photography (as immediate, indexical, machine-made, ephemeral, cheap). ID Card Project (1998) was a diaristic collection of 25 small painted self-portraits copied from age 14-to-31 ID cards. For I See Myself in You (2001), Harvey dressed and posed adult friends to imitate theatrical childhood photographs of herself, then shot Polaroids and painted portraits from them, two for each original image.

100 Free Portraits and I Am a Bad Camera (both 2001) were wry explorations of the artist/sitter relationship. In the former, Harvey posed as a street-portraitist, offering 15-minute pencil portraits in exchange for written evaluations of the pictures; the latter was a 30-minute video of her hand drawing a portrait, projected onto a pad of paper and accompanied by the sitter's voiceover politely complaining about the likeness. She revisited these ideas in her performance 100 Visitors to the Biennial Immortalized and her various "Invisible Self-Portraits" (2008, below), in which she painted her likeness in mirrors, obscured by a photographic flash.

=== Museum and archive works ===
Harvey has often created deadpan copies, re-translations and collections of artworks or cultural materials to comment on the politics of selection, display, meaning and legitimacy in art. For A Whitney for the Whitney at Philip Morris (2003), she created a walk-in museum simulacrum: 394 postcard-sized reproductions of the museum's permanent art collection, copied from its catalogue and painted salon-style directly on walls wrapping around the museum branch gallery, itself framed in gold. Amid her copies, Harvey cut similarly sized slots into the walls, which revealed well-lit, recently acquired, actual artworks that critic Ken Johnson wrote, hovered with "hallucinatory vividness," creating a "magical play with differing dimensions of visual experience." Harvey's rote presentation—alphabetical, with reduction of all to small, brushy paintings—enacted what critics described as a humorous but aggressive leveling of hierarchies of quality and value and the presumed status of museums.

Harvey varied these strategies in two commissioned installations. The Nudist Museum (Bass Museum of Art, 2010–2) examined historical and contemporary obsessions with the body through a packed group of 54 selectively copied, gilt-framed reproductions of every nude in the Bass collection that were hung salon-style over a wall collaged with nudes from pornographic, fashion and fitness magazines. Later installations of The Nudist Museum included a postcard display and the Nudist Museum Gift Shop, featuring portraits of kitsch objects formed out of nudes or body parts. Metal Painting (2015) was commissioned as a companion to an historical exhibition on metalwork at the Barnes Foundation. It consisted of 887 oil-on board, impasto silhouette portraits of each piece of metalwork in the collection. Magnetically mounted salon-style in an interlocking, movable arrangement, they reflected the museum founder's idiosyncratic curation of functional objects alongside Neo-Impressionist and early modernist paintings.

In her two-part Museum of Failure (2007–8, Whitney Biennial), Harvey catalogued the fraught nature of artistic coherence and communication. Collection of Impossible Subjects featured a rear-illuminated mirror wall, hand-engraved with a salon-style collection of ornately framed, glowing sanded-out rectangles; visible through one opening was Invisible Self-Portrait in My Studio, a large trompe l’oeil painting depicting identically framed, rendered studio snippets and self-portraits based on photographs Harvey took in a mirror, with camera flashes obscuring her face. Art in America critic Gregory Volk described it as a "visually stunning" deconstruction of the creation and exhibition process that evoked things unseen, incomprehensible or unrepresented in museums.

Ellen Harvey, Alien Souvenir Stand, oil on aluminum, watercolor on gesso board, propane tanks, plywood, aluminum siding and poles, aluminum diamond plate, and magnets, 10' x 17' x 5', 2013.

=== Ruins and restoration ===
Harvey frequently draws on the Romantic tradition's idealization of ruins and fragments, reframing cycles of cultural production in order to explore fallacies and failures involving representation, communication, permanence, and ideology. For the public art commission Repeat (2013, Bossuit Belgium), she "de-restored" a desanctified, post-WWI village church that had fallen into disrepair and disuse, removing the roof, interior pillars, and ritual furnishings and transforming it into a multi-use public square-artificial ruin; a new terrazzo floor incorporated schematic traces of the removed elements and a grey pattern evoking the shadows of the previous, ruined church after its bombardment.

In several mirrored installations, Harvey re-imagined her sites in elegiac, science-fiction-like, ruined states. Mirror (2005, Pennsylvania Academy of the Fine Arts) recreated a Gothic Revival grand staircase as a picturesque ruin in four ghostly, rear-illuminated, hand-engraved mirror panels in a darkened rotunda. They were accompanied by video projections that documented Harvey engraving the mirror images or drawing the academy's previous buildings; upon completion, they simultaneously shattered or burst into flame. For Ruins Are More Beautiful (2009, Center for Contemporary Art, Ujazdowski Castle), she covered the windows and doors of a renovated exhibition space with mirror engravings depicting the surrounding castle reduced to a forested shambles. Reforestation (2013) superimposed a mirrored engraving of post-digital-age ruins littered with electronic equipment over the reflected image of an actual Internal Revenue Service office; outside, Harvey installed Fossils (2013), carved white-marble sculptures featuring fossilized vestiges of the same technology.

Harvey's absurdist exhibition, The Alien's Guide to the Ruins of Washington, D.C. (2013, Corcoran Gallery), invoked a future earth excavated by aliens left to piece together the lost culture by only its architecture. Based on the classical and neo-classical ruins they find worldwide—on display in The Pillar-Builder Archive (2013), a room of 4,000 alien-classified postcards of such structures—they wildly misinterpret humanity as an egalitarian, three-sexed, aquatic species unified by the building of pillars. Frieze's George Pendle described the show—which included a hand-painted, life-size Alien Souvenir Stand, a tour guide to actual DC sites, and a pillar-influenced alien space ship—as a "less bleakly dystopian than happily deranged" examination of the ubiquity of the classical in worldwide vocabularies of power and constructions of cultural memory.

=== Landscape and mapping works ===
Ellen Harvey, Arcade/Arcadia (inside view), hand-engraved mirrors over LED screens, wood frame, 15' x 9' x 30', 2012.

Harvey has employed landscape and mapping motifs in New York Beautification Project, multifaceted installations and public mosaics. Observations Concerning the Picturesque (2009, SMAK) and Rooms of Sublime Wallpaper (I & II, 2008) examined privileged notions of the picturesque landscape; the former included a pastiche guidebook supposedly written by artist-landscapist William Gilpin, an invented archive of his works, and related signs and tours in an actual park.

Arcade/Arcadia (2011–7) was commissioned for the opening of Turner Contemporary in Margate. It examined the sublime, ephemerality and loss, juxtaposing the seaside town's one-time idyllic status as a resort and haven for J. M. W. Turner and its contemporary socioeconomic decline. Harvey built a skeletal version of Turner's London gallery, hung with 34 rear-illuminated, hand-engraved mirrors mimicking the exhibition at the time of his death, which depicted a panoramic view of the shabbier, contemporary Margate. Reviewers described it as "witty and poignant," and "a combination of funhouse and haunted house … more spiritual than secular." Harvey's later project, The Disappointed Tourist (2019– ), revisited these themes through a painted archive of sites that no longer exist—from amusement parks to classical monuments to themed restaurants remembered from childhood—that respondents submitted online as places they wished they could once again visit. The project's installation at Turner Contemporary (2021) consisted of over 220 paintings hung in an enormous grid and placed in dialogue with works by Turner (sketches of Roman ruins and coastal views of Margate). Frieze described its effect as "something quite mournful, like a wall of faces of missing people after a disaster." The project's installation at Museum der Moderne Salzburg (2021) was described as an attempt to "localize existential memories," mapping a spectrum that ranged from traumatic experiences (war, racism, and ecological disaster) to more mundane losses caused by technological change or gentrification.

Ellen Harvey, The Disappointed Tourist, oil and acrylic on 220 wood panels, each 18" x 24", installation variable, here: 60" x 10 ft., 2021, Turner Contemporary.

In The Unloved (2015, Groeninge Museum, Bruges) Harvey mapped competing representations of the port, Bruges, in a five-room installation that unfolded historically and geographically. One side featured Harvey's large greyscale paintings of contemporary satellite views of the city, inlayed with mirrors; opposite them, large mirrored walls pierced with rectangular openings revealed hidden walls carrying chronologically installed, historical paintings of Bruges that she "rescued" from the museum's storage depot. For Atlantis (2019, Miami Beach), Harvey installed a 10-by-100-foot, mouth-blown mirror wall engraved with her painting of a satellite view mapping a diagonal swath of Florida from the Gulf of Mexico through the Everglades to Miami Beach and the Atlantic Ocean; reflecting visitors, the image seems to float in response to changing light conditions, alluding to Florida's intimate and uneasy relationship with its water table. She reworked the design for Atlantis into a 10 x 100-foot painting, Mermaid: Two Incompatible Systems Intimately Linked (2019), that more directly contrasts the natural with the man-made landscape. In the public work You Are Here (2013, with Jan Baracz, Philadelphia International Airport), Harvey and Baracz diagrammed the flight approach to the airport on a large bank of sandblasted and airbrushed windows; Network (2019) charts the Boston transportation network in mosaic, with nearly invisible mermaids representing the contributions of female transportation engineers.

Harvey's public mosaics Look Up Not Down (2005, Queens Plaza Subway Station) and Home of the Stars (2009, Yankee Stadium Metro-North station) employed ground-level views, respectively, of the Manhattan and Queens skylines and the Bronx sky in an 11-panel progression from cloud-filled daylight to starry night. The mosaics Green Map (2019, San Francisco) and Mathematical Star (2013, Brooklyn, Marcy Plaza) used more metaphorical strategies, inverting traditional mapping to highlight only local protected natural spaces in the former, and representing the Bedford-Stuyvesant neighborhood in a quilt pattern of diamond designs based on photographs of eighteen neighborhood landmarks selected by the local community board in the latter.

== Awards and collections ==
Harvey has received fellowships from the John S. Guggenheim Foundation (2016), George A. & Eliza Gardener Howard Foundation (2019) and New York Foundation for the Arts/Lily Auchincloss Foundation (2002), as well as awards from the New York Community Trust (2007), Pew Charitable Trust (2004), Rema Hort Mann Foundation (2004) and Artists Space (2001). In addition to several artist residencies, she has been awarded public art commissions from New York Percent for Art, New York Arts in Transit, the Chicago Transit Authority, Philadelphia International Airport, U.S. Art in Architecture Program, San Francisco Airport, WTS (Women's Transportation Seminar) Boston, Miami Beach Convention Center, and the Municipality of Avelgem, Belgium.

Harvey's work belongs to public collections from around the world, including the Whitney Museum, Hammer Museum, Art Omi, Berkeley Art Museum (BAMPFA), Center for Contemporary Art (Poland), Centro Galego de Arte Contemporanea (Spain), Gwangju Art Museum (Korea), Philadelphia Academy of Fine Arts, Princeton Art Museum, and Wyspa Institute (Poland). She is represented by Locks Gallery (Philadelphia), Galerie Gebrüder Lehmann (Dresden, Germany), and Meessen De Clercq (Brussels, Belgium).

== Publications ==
- Ellen Harvey: Museum of Failure (2015)
- The Unloved: Ellen Harvey (2014)
- Ellen Harvey: Mirror (2005)
- New York Beautification Project (2005, 2021)
