= Katharine T. Carter & Associates =

Katharine T. Carter & Associates is an artist advisory and career development service headquartered in Kinderhook, New York. Founded in 1985 (40 years ago), the firm provides professional assessment, strategic planning, promotional materials, and exhibition placements for individual client artists. It also offers rent-free group and solo exhibitions to museums, nonprofit exhibition spaces, and private galleries throughout the United States.

== History ==
Company founder Katharine T. Carter, a Florida native, began her career as an artist, teacher, and public speaker. She earned her BA at the University of Florida, Gainesville, in 1976 and did post-graduate studies at the School of Visual Arts, New York, until 1978. At the invitation of Marcia Tucker, director of the New Museum, Carter first showed her paintings in New York while studying at the University of South Florida in Tampa, from which she received an MFA in 1980. Her work appeared in shows at the New Museum, the P.S. 1 Contemporary Art Center, and the Hal Bromm Gallery, all in New York, and the Jessica Berwind Gallery in Philadelphia. In all, Carter had twenty one-person exhibitions in museums and college galleries, and received reviews in publications such as Arts magazine and the New York Times. In the late 1980s, however, her artistic career was curtailed by an automobile accident in Philadelphia, which deprived the Hard Edge painter of full use of her arms for an extended period. In subsequent years, she combined public speaking engagements with teaching at institutions such as the University of the South, Sewanee, Tennessee.

Having launched an annual educational slide-lecture tour in 1985, which presented the “Highlights of the New York Art Season” to art professionals and the general public throughout the United States for ten years, Carter left teaching to become a full-time public speaker. After she added two professional development seminars to her programming, her time on the road grew to some 250 days per year.

In 1985, encouraged by New York Times critic William Zimmer, Carter established Katharine T. Carter & Associates with the aim of aiding artists to professionalize their methods of career planning and self-presentation. She maintains an associate pool of twenty-one consulting critics, curators, gallerists, and designers based in New York and Los Angeles. To date, the company has booked approximately 1,000 exhibitions at 300 U.S. institutions. In 2010, Carter and her associates published the advice manual Accelerating on the Curves: The Artist's Roadmap to Success (Kinderhook, N.Y., Running Hare Press; revised and expanded, 2016).

== Business Philosophy ==
The firm operates on the premise that artists can and should set their own business goals and largely direct the exhibition placement and marketing of their own work. This is viewed as both a desirable option in itself and a pragmatic response to a decades-long shift within the art system that has led to a greater sharing of responsibilities, costs, and profits among artists, curators, public relations specialists, and dealers.

== Methodology ==
Client artists meet initially with Carter to assess the nature of their work and the current state of their career. Each artist is asked to consider where they are professionally (emerging, midcareer, or senior) and what level of recognition—local, regional, or national—they realistically hope to attain. Considerations include the client's training, type of work, place of residence, personal obligations, and level of commitment. Once Carter and the artist agree on these parameters, a personalized plan of action is contracted, with certain results (such as a minimum number of museum exhibition placements) explicitly stipulated. The fixed-fee contract runs until those results are achieved. Katharine T. Carter and Associates does not sell art and does not take a commission on any sales realized by client artists.

== Services ==
The company's services are two-fold—those supplied to the client artists and those provided to organizations that schedule exhibitions of work by client artists. Some artists elect to have studio visits from several KTC associates, who offer their own critical response to the work and give specific placement recommendations. All clients receive a strategic career plan, customized marketing material (query letters, press releases, an artist's statement, announcement cards, etc.), curatorial guidance in selecting works for exhibition, a full-color brochure with an essay by a KTC associate, and a guaranteed number of exhibition placements at the agreed-upon levels.

Arts organizations taking an exhibition from Katharine T. Carter and Associates receive pre-written publicity material, 200 color brochures with a critic's essay, 1,000 color announcement cards, and museum wall text. There is no rental fee for the show. The hosting organization pays shipping and in-transit/on-premises insurance.
