= Edward MacDowell Medal =

Annual award in American arts and culture

- Awarded for: Outstanding contribution to American culture and the arts
- Country: United States
- Presented by: MacDowell
- First award: 1960
- Most recent: Yoko Ono (2024)
- Website: www.macdowell.org/medal-day-history

The Edward MacDowell Medal is an award which has been given since 1960 to one person annually who has made an outstanding contribution to American culture and the arts. It is given by MacDowell, the first artist residency program in the United States.

== Background ==
The award is named for composer Edward MacDowell, who, with pianist Marian MacDowell, his wife, founded the MacDowell artist residency (formerly known as The MacDowell Colony) in 1907. The residency exists to nurture the arts by offering creative individuals of the highest talent an inspiring environment in which to produce enduring works of the imagination. Each year, MacDowell welcomes more than 300 architects, composers, filmmakers, interdisciplinary artists, theatre artists, visual artists, and writers from across the United States and around the globe

== History of the award ==
Established in 1960 with the first award going to Thornton Wilder, the award is given to one artist each year, from among seven artistic disciplines, "architecture, visual art, music composition, theater, writing, filmmaking and interdisciplinary art."

Composer Aaron Copland was the second recipient of the award in 1961. Copland had been a resident of the artist's residency eight times between 1925 and 1956, and served as MacDowell's president from 1962 to 1968.

Painter Georgia O'Keeffe received the award in 1972. O'Keeffe, who was then 84 years old, decided not to attend, and asked art historian Lloyd Goodrich to accept the award on her behalf. Goodrich explained that O'Keeffe believed that her paintings were more important than her words.

When writer Mary McCarthy won the award in 1984, The New York Times sent culture reporter Samuel G. Freedman to interview McCarthy and cover the ceremony. McCarthy commented that if she knew that her nemesis, writer Lillian Hellman had won the award in 1976, she would have "probably not" accepted it. McCarthy conceded that the fact that her former husband, writer Edmund Wilson, had received the award in 1964 lent credibility to the honor.

Composer and conductor Leonard Bernstein won the award in 1987. Bernstein observed that it was the first award he had received solely for musical composition. Bernard Holland, writing in The New York Times, noted that Bernstein had "made full use of the quiet and solitude of this venerable refuge for artists" three times previously, having been a resident there in 1962, 1970 and 1972.

Award winner and writer William Styron spoke at the 1988 awards ceremony. He said that the group of previous winners "represents the brightest constellation of American talent that could be assembled in the latter half of this century", and that "their work has been of supreme value to the world".

Composer Stephen Sondheim, who won the award in 2013, was the first winner with a background in musical theater.

When California artist Betye Saar won the 2014 award, a reporter for the Los Angeles Times commented that she was "joining an elite roster of honorees."

Jazz composer and musician Gunther Schuller was scheduled to receive the 2015 award on his 90th birthday. However, Schuller died June 21, 2015, before he could receive the award.

== Medal Day ==
The Edward MacDowell Medal has been awarded during a free, public ceremony at MacDowell grounds in Peterborough, New Hampshire, to such figures as Aaron Copland (1961), Robert Frost (1962), Georgia O'Keeffe (1972), Leonard Bernstein (1987), Stephen Sondheim (2013), and Betye Saar (2014). The MacDowell chairperson—currently MacDowell fellow and author Nell Irvin Painter—hosts the ceremony typically held on a summer Sunday in July or August beginning at noon. Following the award ceremony, guests can have picnic lunches before open studio tours, which are hosted by MacDowell artists-in-residence.

== List of recipients and speakers ==
Year	Medalist	Speaker
1960	Thornton Wilder	Edward Weeks
1961	Aaron Copland	Irving Kolodin
1962	Robert Frost	Aaron Copland
1963	Alexander Calder	Meyer Shapiro
1964	Edmund Wilson	Aaron Copland
1965	Edgard Varese	Milton Babbitt
1966	Edward Hopper	Lloyd Goodrich
1967	Marianne Moore	Glenn Wescott
1968	Roger Sessions	Edward T. Cone
1969	Louise Nevelson	John Canaday
1970	Eudora Welty	Elizabeth Janeway
1971	William Schuman	Aaron Copland
1972	Georgia O'Keeffe	Eric Larrabee
1973	Norman Mailer	John Leonard
1974	Walter Piston	Michael Steinberg
1975	Willem de Kooning	Dore Ashton
1976	Lillian Hellman	John Hersey
1977	Virgil Thomson	Alfred Frankenstein
1978	Richard Diebenkorn	John Canaday
1979	John Cheever	Elizabeth Hardwick
1980	Samuel Barber	Charles Wadsworth
1981	John Updike	Wilfred Sheed
1982	Isamu Noguchi	William Lieberman
1983	Elliott Carter	Michael Steinberg
1984	Mary McCarthy	Elizabeth Hardwick
1985	Robert Motherwell	Varujan Boghosian
1986	Lee Friedlander	John Szarkowski
1987	Leonard Bernstein	Ned Rorem
1988	William Styron	George Plimpton
1989	Stan Brakhage	John Hanhardt
1990	Louise Bourgeois	Robert Storr
1991	David Diamond	Joseph Polisi
1992	Richard Wilbur	Richard Howard
1993	Harry Callahan	Anne Tucker
1994	Jasper Johns	Kirk Varnedoe
1995	George Crumb	Christopher Rouse
1996	Joan Didion	Elizabeth Hardwick
1997	Chuck Jones	John Canemaker
1998	I. M. Pei	J. Carter Brown
1999	Ellsworth Kelly	James Cuno
2000	Lou Harrison	Dennis Russell Davies
2001	Philip Roth	William Styron
2002	Robert Frank	Philip Brookman
2003	Merce Cunningham	Meredith Monk
2004	Nam June Paik	John Hanhardt
2005	Steve Reich	David Lang and Richard Serra
2006	Alice Munro	Virginia Barber
2007	Les Blank	Frederick Wiseman
2008	Thom Mayne	Robert Campbell
2009	Kiki Smith	Lynne Tillman
2010	Sonny Rollins	Gary Giddins
2011	Edward Albee	Mike Nichols
2012	Nan Goldin	Lucy Sante
2013	Stephen Sondheim	Frank Rich
2014	Betye Saar	Lowery Stokes Sims
2015	Gunther Schuller (posthumous)	Yehudi Wyner and Terrance McKnight
2016	Toni Morrison	Peter Sellars
2017	David Lynch	Kristine McKenna
2018	Art Spiegelman	Hillary Chute
2019	Charles Gaines	Thelma Golden
2021†	Rosanne Cash	Kurt Andersen
2022	Sonia Sanchez	Walter Mosley
2023	Alanis Obomsawin	Jesse Wente
2024	Yoko Ono	Nell Irvin Painter

† The 2021 recipient had been announced in 2020.
