= Lisa Phillips (museum director) =

American museum director, curator and author

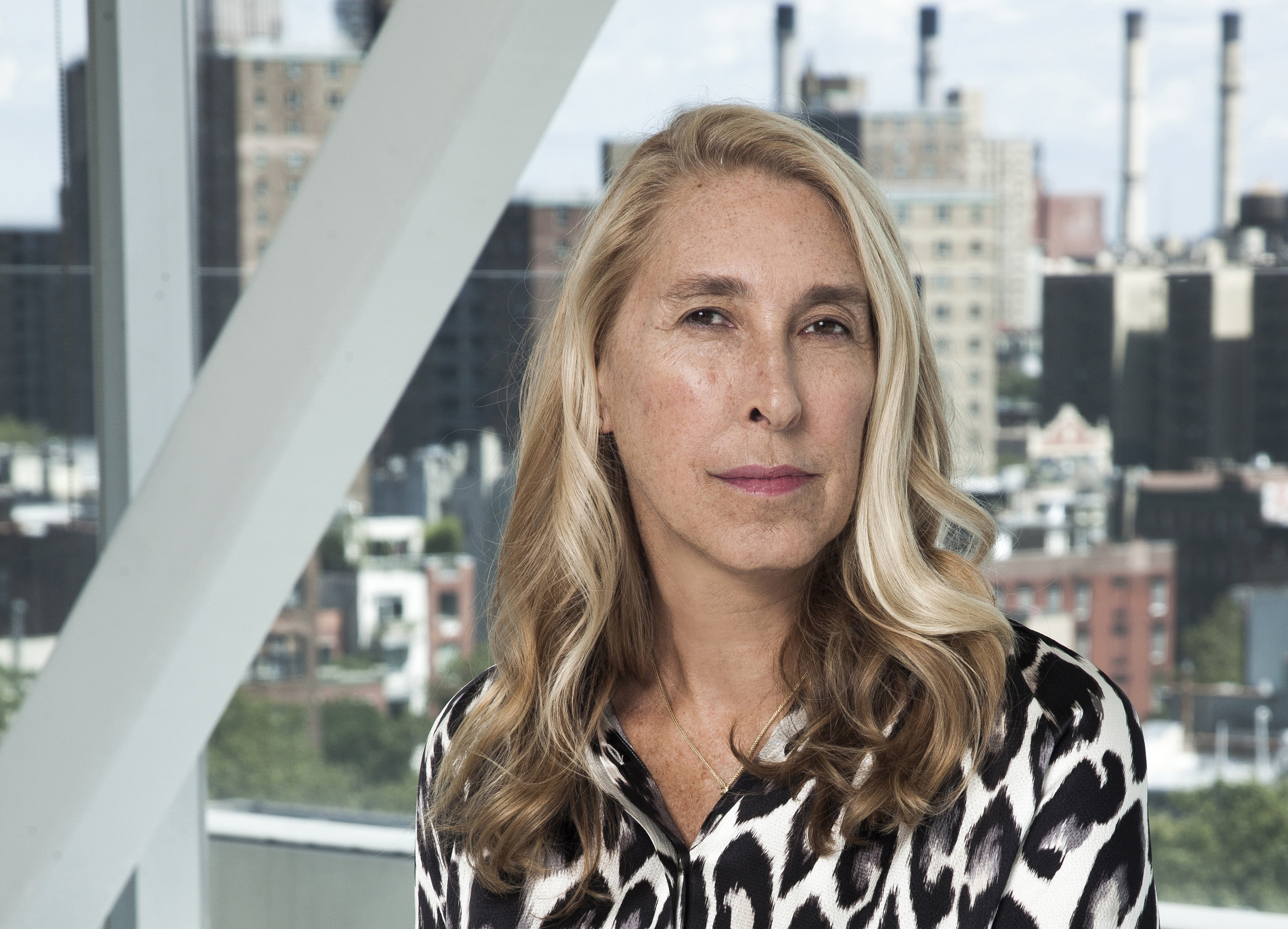
- Lisa Phillips
- Born: Manhattan, New York
- Occupations: Director, curator, and author
- Title: Director of the New Museum of Contemporary Art
- Parent: Warren H. Phillips

Lisa Phillips is an American museum director, curator, and author. She is the Toby Devan Lewis Director of the New Museum of Contemporary Art, in New York City. In 1999, Phillips became the second director in the museum's history, succeeding founding director Marcia Tucker. On September 25, 2025, she announced that she would retire in April 2026. Prior to beginning her directorship at the New Museum, she worked at the Whitney Museum of American Art for twenty-three years.

== Early life and education ==
Phillips was born in Manhattan, New York City, and grew up in Brooklyn Heights. Her father, Warren H. Phillips, is the former chairman and CEO of Dow Jones & Company. She attended Packer Collegiate Institute and received her BA in Art History with honors from Middlebury College in 1975. She studied music, art, and art history in Vienna during her junior year and spent time at the Kunsthistorisches Museum and the Albertina copying master drawings, there becoming interested in museums. She later entered the PhD program in Art History at the Graduate Center of the City University of New York where she studied with Linda Nochlin, Rosalind Krauss, and Leo Steinberg, and took courses at Hunter College's Art History program.

== Career ==
=== The Whitney Museum of American Art ===
Phillips began her career as a Helena Rubinstein Fellow in the Whitney's Independent Study Program in 1976 and became a curator in 1982. She was mentored as curator by Thomas N. Armstrong III. During her twenty-two-years at the Whitney, she organized over thirty exhibitions, including the notable thematic exhibitions "The Third Dimension: Sculpture of the New York School” (1984); “High Styles: the History of American Design” (1985); “Image World: Art and Media Culture” (1989); “Beat Culture and the New America, 1950–1965” (1994); and “The American Century Part II: 1950–2000” (1999); midcareer surveys of works by Terry Winters (1986), Cindy Sherman (1987), Julian Schnabel (1987), and Richard Prince (1992); as well as a major retrospective of the work of Frederick Kiesler (1988). Known for championing midcareer and emerging artists, Phillips was also a curator for six Whitney Biennials (1985, 1987, 1989, 1991, 1993, and 1997).

=== New Museum ===
After joining the New Museum as Director in 1999, Phillips spearheaded and oversaw the successful completion of the museum's first freestanding building by the leading architectural team SANAA (Kazuyo Sejima and Ryue Nishizawa), which opened on the Bowery in 2007. The building was also recognized when SANAA received the 2010 Pritzker Prize, making Kazuyo Sejima the second female architect to receive the prestigious award. The presence of the museum on the Bowery also spurred a renaissance of the street and neighborhood, including a new district for galleries and creative spaces. In 2008, Phillips led the acquisition of an adjacent fifty-thousand-square-foot property at 231 Bowery. Ground for new galleries was designed by OMA / Shohei Shigematsu and Rem Koolhaas in collaboration with Cooper Robertson and broke ground in November 2022; the space is expected to open in Fall 2025. The building will also include space for the New Museum's technology incubator NEW INC.

During her tenure, the museum's operating budget has expanded from $3.5 million to $13 million annually and doubled the museum's space. Under Phillips's leadership, the museum expanded its programming to include several initiatives, including the TRIENNIAL for emerging international artists; the MUSEUM AS HUB, a partnership of international organizations to study and share art from around the globe; IdeasCity, an international festival that explores the art and culture of urban centers; and NEW INC, a museum-led incubator (a shared workspace and professional development program designed to support creative practitioners). The New Museum created a dedicated space for digital art projects in 2000 (Media Z Lounge), which subsequently led to bringing on Rhizome as an affiliate organization in 2003.

Phillips has also organized a number of benchmark exhibitions at the New Museum, including exhibitions of the works of Paul McCarthy (2001), Carroll Dunham (2002–03), John Waters (2004), and Chris Burden (2013–14).

In 2003, The New York Times reported that Phillips was one of the candidates interviewed for the position as director of the Whitney Museum; the position eventually went to Adam D. Weinberg.

Phillips has been running an art museum in New York longer than anyone except Glenn Lowry at the Museum of Modern Art (she took over in 1999, he in 1995.) She is one of only two directors in the city who has overseen the construction of a brand-new building. Philips spearheaded an $80 million capital campaign to double her museum's size.

=== Other activities ===
Phillips has served and continues to serve on several boards and advisory boards, including the Fabric Workshop and Museum, the Fulbright Fellowship Program, the Andy Warhol Foundation for the Visual Arts (for which she was a trustee and executive committee member from 2002 to 2012), White Columns, Lower Manhattan Cultural Council, the Azuero Earth Project, CIFO, the Frederick Kiesler Foundation, the Jay DeFeo Trust, and the Association of Art Museum Directors, where she is the chair of the Professional Issues Committee and works on the Futures Task Force.

She has consulted for several companies, including Peat Marwick, Chase Manhattan Bank and Goldman Sachs, and has held several education posts, including Visiting Critic at Yale University. In 2013, she helped lead a study of the gender-based compensation disparity among American museum directors, which received national attention.

== Personal life ==
Phillips is married to Leon Falk and has twin daughters. She lives in New York City.

== Awards ==
Phillips was voted a top New Yorker by Time Out New York and New York Magazine and was the recipient of the Battery Park Conservancy's cultural medal of honor (2009); the StellaRe Prize, Turin (2008); and the ArtTable Award of Distinction (2011). She was named one of the "100 Most Influential Women in Business" by Crain's in 2007.
