= Richard Armstrong (museum director) =

American museum director

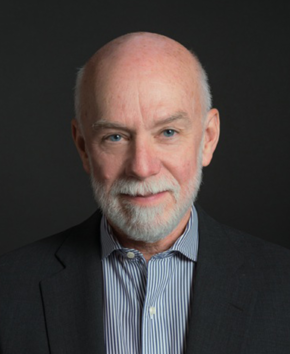
- Armstrong in 2012
- Born: 1949 (age 76–77); Kansas City, Missouri, US
- Education: Lake Forest College; Université de Dijon; The Sorbonne
- Occupation: Museum director
- Organization: Solomon R. Guggenheim Foundation

Richard Armstrong (born 1949) is an American museum director. Since 2008, Armstrong has been the director of the Solomon R. Guggenheim Foundation, including the Solomon R. Guggenheim Museum in New York City and its other museums throughout the world. Before joining the Guggenheim, he was a curator at, and then director of, Carnegie Museum of Art in Pittsburgh, Pennsylvania. From 1981 to 1992, he had been a curator at the Whitney Museum of American Art.

In addition to supervising the operations and exhibitions of the Guggenheim foundation's museums, Armstrong's tenure has included several collaborations with various organizations to offer programs intended to broaden the foundation's collection and activities geographically and digitally.

== Early life ==
Armstrong was born and raised in Kansas City, Missouri. During his summer vacations as a teenager in the 1960s, he worked as a page for U.S. Representative Richard Bolling and U.S. Senator Stuart Symington. During these hot summers in Washington, D.C., he visited air-conditioned museums, especially the National Gallery of Art. In 1968, after a year at Lake Forest College in Illinois, and shortly after the assassinations of Martin Luther King Jr. and Robert F. Kennedy, Armstrong moved to Dijon, France. There he explored French art and architecture.

Armstrong soon began to study at the Université de Dijon and then at the Sorbonne. Living in an unheated apartment, he spent time at the Louvre, finding the warm museum as welcoming during the Parisian winter as the cool ones had been in earlier summers. Armstrong returned to finish his BA degree in Art History at Lake Forest in 1973.

== Career from 1973 to 2008 ==
After graduating, Armstrong first sought work as a freelance journalist, but he was soon given a one-year internship at the Whitney Museum of American Art's independent study program. He was mentored as a curator by Thomas N. Armstrong III. To earn enough money to live in New York, he worked as a studio assistant for artists Al Held and Nancy Graves. In 1974, the Whitney hired him to work with curator Marcia Tucker, who, the following year, encouraged him to take a curator position in California at the La Jolla Museum of Contemporary Art. In 1980, Armstrong joined a committee to help organize the new Museum of Contemporary Art, Los Angeles.

He returned to the Whitney in 1981, initially as instructor in the independent study program, and he soon became a curator, developing exhibitions and working directly with artists. There, he organized four biennials, as well as exhibitions on Richard Artschwager and Alexis Smith and the exhibition The New Sculpture 1965–75. In 1992, he moved to Carnegie Museum of Art in Pittsburgh, Pennsylvania, as Curator of Contemporary Art, where he again focused on collaborating with living artists, which he believes is an essential part of the mission of a contemporary art museum. He raised more than $50 million for the museum and expanded its collection of contemporary art. He was appointed chief curator in 1995 and director of the museum in 1996.

== Guggenheim ==
Armstrong was appointed director of the Solomon R. Guggenheim Museum and Foundation in November 2008. His curatorial background contrasted with the business background of his controversial predecessor, Thomas Krens. Recalling the goal of the Guggenheim's first director, Hilla von Rebay, to create a "temple of the spirit", Armstrong stated early in his tenure at the Guggenheim: "We need to expand on the original optimism and taste for the utopian that guided the museum in its beginnings [while making] sure the parts [of the foundation's global collection] are conjoined and working in harmony with one another."

In addition to overseeing the activities of all of the foundation's museums, and in particular the New York collection, Armstrong coordinateed the foundations' acquisitions and scholarship, and its loan exhibitions and collaborations with other museums to foster public outreach. A 2009 retrospective of Frank Lloyd Wright at the New York museum showcased the architect on the 50th anniversary of the opening of the building and was the museum's most popular exhibit since it began keeping such attendance records in 1992. Under Armstrong, Foundation projects included YouTube Play. A Biennial of Creative Video; the BMW Guggenheim Lab, a travelling exhibition, forum and experiment focused on urban living; the Guggenheim UBS MAP Global Art Initiative, to work with curators from around the world to identify and acquire artworks from Asia, South America, the Middle East and Africa; and a collaboration with the Robert H.N. Ho Family Foundation to commission and exhibit works by Chinese-born artists. Many of these projects were focused on broadening the geographical scope of the museums' collection and activities. Armstrong commented in 2012: "We are hoping to challenge our Western-centric view of art history." Exhibitions at the Guggenheim Museum in New York under Armstrong included Kandinsky (2009), Chaos and Classicism: Art in France, Italy, and Germany, 1918–1936 and Maurizio Cattelan: All (2011).

Armstrong served, during this period, in an advisory capacity on several foundation boards, including the Victor Pinchuk Foundation, Kyiv, Ukraine; the Artistic Council, Beyeler Foundation, Basel, Switzerland; the Al Held Foundation, New York City; and the Judd Foundation. He is a director of the Fine Family Foundation, Pittsburgh. He was also a member of the Association of Art Museum Directors.

Armstrong left the museum in late 2023.
