= Shamim M. Momin =

American curator (born 1973)

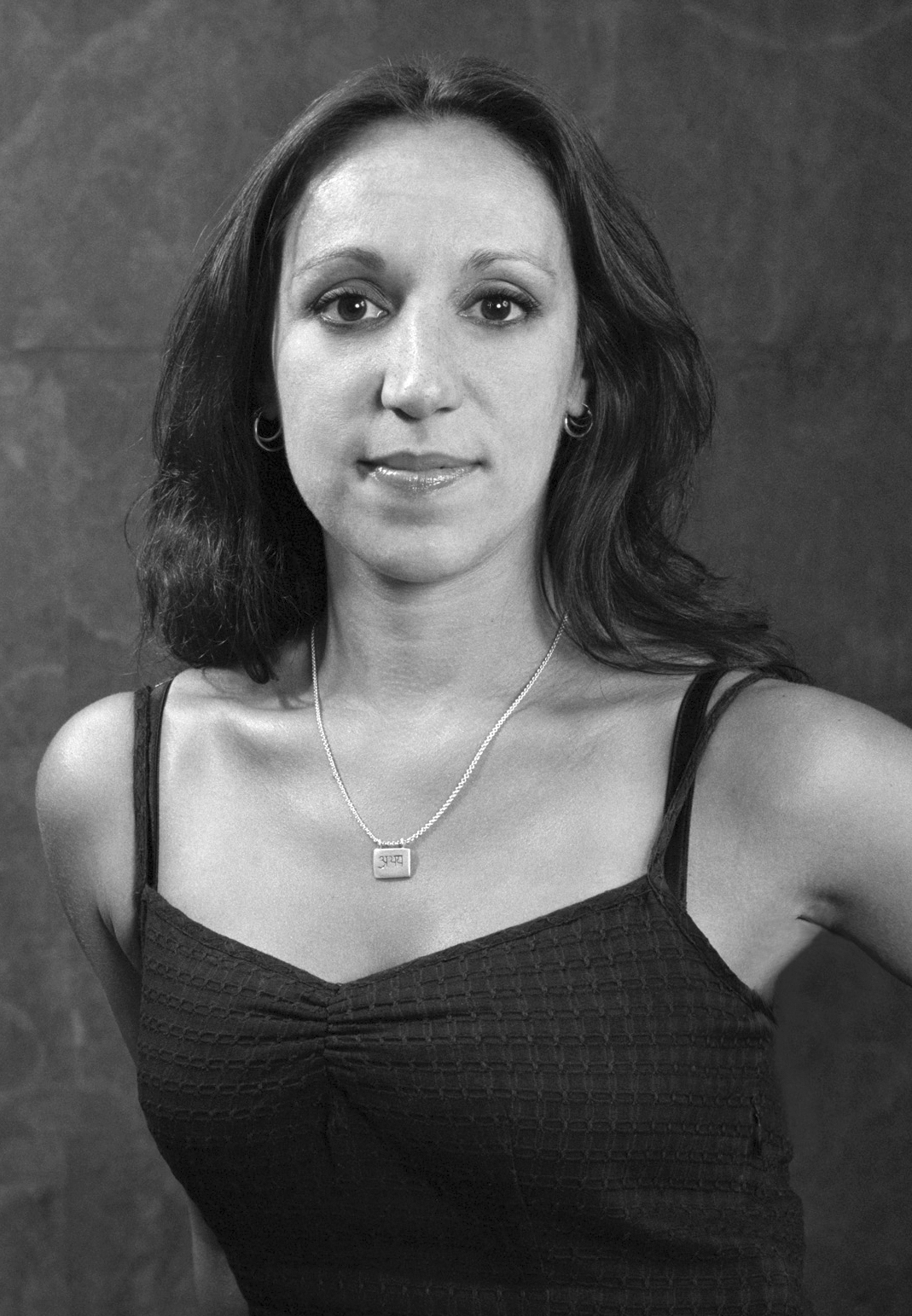
- Shamim M. Momi, 2011
- Born: August 16, 1973 (age 52)
- Education: Williams College (BA)
- Occupations: Curator, museum director, writer
- Known for: Co-curator of 2004 and 2008 Whitney Biennials; Founder of LAND (Los Angeles Nomadic Division); Director of the Bronx Museum of the Arts

Shamim M. Momin (born August 16, 1973) is an American curator, writer, and museum director. Her curatorial work has contributed to the development of post-medium experimentation, affective vulnerability, and performative identity in early 21st-century contemporary art.

Reflecting on the Whitney Biennial, she described curating as creating “an unfixed arena of past possibilities,” evoking an approach centered on emotional and conceptual openness. Critics have described Momin as “totally in the art world bloodstream; she sees everything; goes everywhere,” highlighting her influence as both a curator and cultural figure.

Reflecting on Momin’s impact, former Whitney Museum director Adam D. Weinberg stated, “Her curatorial acumen is peerless.”

== Early life and education ==
Momin was born in the United States to immigrants, an Indian father and a French mother. She earned a BA in art history from Williams College in 1995. She later attended the Whitney Independent Study Program.

== Whitney Museum of American Art (1996–2008) ==
Momin began her career at the Whitney Museum under Thelma Golden and eventually succeeded her as Branch Director of the Whitney Museum of American Art at Altria, the museum's midtown satellite space. She commissioned over 50 projects by emerging artists and also served as associate curator at the main museum. At just 27 years old, Momin became one of the youngest directors of the Whitney Museum’s Altria branch.

She co-curated the 2004 and 2008 Whitney Biennials, helping launch the careers of artists including Ellen Harvey, Do Ho Suh, Mark Bradford, Terence Koh, and Javier Téllez.

Her solo exhibitions included Terence Koh (2007), Mark Grotjahn (2006), Raymond Pettibon (2005–06), and Banks Violette (2005). Other projects featured Andrea Zittel, Rob Fischer, Sue de Beer, Luis Gispert, Katie Grinnan, Dario Robleto, and E.V. Day.

In 2008, she co-organized The Station, an independent group exhibition staged in a 14,000 sq ft space in Miami during Art Basel. In 2009, she organized exhibitions by Alex Bag at the Whitney and Nothingness and Being at Colección Jumex near Mexico City.

== Defining the zeitgeist (2004–2011) ==
Momin’s curatorial practice helped define the cultural zeitgeist of the 2000s through cross-disciplinary experimentation, affective materiality, and the blending of persona and practice.

=== Art as persona and ritual ===
In the 2004 Whitney Biennial, co‑curated by Momin, she showcased artists such as Terence Koh, Dash Snow, and Banks Violette, whose work pushed the boundaries of identity, performance, and ritual. Dash Snow’s Polaroid collages “subject the harsh realities of urban life to his eye for the disarmingly picturesque,” combining raw street fragments with personal imagery. Banks Violette’s installations—such as his burned-out salt sculpture of a church at the Whitney—were described as engaging “ritual murder and teenage suicide” through minimal form and subcultural symbols.

These artists exemplified what some critics saw as a post-9/11 turn in contemporary art toward mythic self-styling and affective vulnerability.

=== Post-medium experimentation ===
The 2008 Whitney Biennial, co-curated by Shamim M. Momin and Henriette Huldisch, marked a shift toward interdisciplinary, ephemeral, and process-based art. Critic Jerry Saltz noted that the show featured only seven painters among 81 artists and praised it for embracing "anti-spectacle," "ephemerality," and noted that “Huldisch and Momin should be congratulated for mounting a thoughtful show that, while academic and narrow, is neither dogmatic… nor sprawling… nor sexist (about 40 percent of the individual artists are women, which may be a Biennial record)."

The exhibition included immersive, socially engaged, and time-based works across video, installation, and participatory practices, with Holland Cotter noting in The New York Times the Biennial's "ambitious program of performance art ". Artist MK Guth presented Ties of Protection and Safekeeping (2008), a large-scale braid constructed from cloth strips contributed by visitors, blending social ritual with sculpture. Jedediah Caesar contributed resin-cast sculptures incorporating studio debris, reflecting a material-process approach, while Javier Téllez’s filmic installations explored themes of institutional care and marginalization.

Together, these works reflected a broader curatorial trend toward what art historian Rosalind Krauss has described as the “post-medium condition”—a move away from medium specificity toward expanded, hybrid forms.

=== Emotional realness and material vulnerability ===
In the early 2000s, artists featured in Momin's exhibitions explored emotional openness and material fragility. Mark Bradford, whose work Momin supported during her tenure at the Whitney, uses layered paper and billboard fragments to create large compositions that “explore social and political structures that objectify marginalized communities and the bodies of vulnerable populations.”

Ellen Harvey’s installation A Whitney for the Whitney (2003–2005), first shown at the Whitney Museum at Altria, consisted of hand-painted copies of works from the museum's collection displayed alongside actual pieces. The work prompted viewers to reflect on “the absurdities of treating art as a commodity” and engaged emotional resonance through institutional critique.

In writing on Sue De Beer's work, Momin writes that the artist: "often focuses on moments of rupture, emotional extremes that are true enough, deep enough, terrifying enough, to trouble any seamless, linear retelling of a life" Critic Jeffrey Kastner in writing on De Beer's show curated by Momin at the Whitney, "Like Kristeva's meditation on melancholia referenced by its title, ‘Black Sun’ confronts issues of identity, memory, and longing... its use of uncanny distortions of time and place to evoke the anxious process of adolescent psychosexual awakening.”

These inclusions reflected a growing curatorial interest in affective sincerity, where vulnerability and self-reflection were not merely stylistic tendencies but critical and institutional strategies.

=== The curator as cultural figure ===
Momin’s visible presence in art-world social spaces was an extension of her curatorial philosophy, which emphasized emotional affect, performative identity, and the fluid boundaries between public persona and artistic practice. Rather than operating solely behind institutional frameworks, she engaged with the same cultural circuits as the artists she championed—an approach that reflected the ethos of the early 2000s art scene.

In 2008, The New York Times described her as “one of the most watched young curators in the country, as much for her institutional exhibitions as for the social presence she brings to them.” That same year, she was featured in multiple entries in Artforum’s Scene & Herd column for her appearances at Art TLV, Miami Basel, and other events.

In a 2010 interview with VICE, Momin reflected on her constant travel as a form of curatorial research: “It’s essential to get a good grasp on what’s going on.”

As noted in a 2015 profile, her leadership at LAND (Los Angeles Nomadic Division) “helped shape the new L.A. renaissance,” suggesting her curatorial work was inseparable from the artistic ecosystems she helped cultivate.

Through her exhibitions and cultural engagement, Momin embodied many of the same sensibilities that defined the artists of her generation—positioning the curator not only as a facilitator of cultural production but as a visible, affective participant in its formation.

== LAND — Los Angeles Nomadic Division (2009-2018) ==
In 2009, Momin co-founded and became Director of the Los Angeles Nomadic Division (LAND), a nonprofit public art organization based in Los Angeles. She conceptualized LAND as a “museum-at-large” dedicated to site-specific public art across Los Angeles and beyond. Under her leadership, LAND developed a three-part programming model: large-scale, multi-artist and multi-site exhibitions; single-artist monographic commissions; and ephemeral, one-night-only performances and events.

During her tenure, Momin oversaw dozens of public art projects, including high-profile collaborations with artists such as Oscar Tuazon, Alex Israel, Daniel Joseph Martinez, and Glenn Kaino. Notable initiatives included the Eugenia Butler Retrospective (part of the Getty’s Pacific Standard Time initiative in 2011), the one-day group exhibition The Island at Art Basel Miami Beach (2010), and Nothing Beside Remains, a nomadic exhibition staged in Marfa, Texas (2011–2012).

Momin also led the ambitious Manifest Destiny Billboard Project (2013–2015), a cross-country exhibition of 100 artist-designed billboards along the entirety of Interstate 10 from Florida to California. Developed in collaboration with artist Zoe Crosher, the project involved ten artists each contributing ten billboards, transforming the highway into a distributed exhibition space spanning 2,460 miles.

At LAND, she emphasized “I would say the core of our mission at LAND came from my experience working on the 2008 Biennial (with Henriette Huldisch)... A lot of the artists that we wanted to include worked in what we were then calling 'expanded practice,' where all different types of artwork were equally important to them within the scope of their work. It just needed something other than a white cube... It was a pretty dramatic part of that Biennial, and it led to a lot of thinking about the LAND model for me.”

Momin organized more than 100 commissions by some 300 artists during her tenure at LAND.

== Henry Art Gallery (2018–2025) ==
From 2018 to 2025, Momin served as Director of Curatorial Affairs at the Henry Art Gallery at the University of Washington in Seattle.

Her exhibitions during this period included solo shows by Tala Madani ("Be Flat", 2020), Kelly Akashi ("Encounters", 2019), Gary Simmons ("The Engine Room", 2021), and Sarah Cain ("Day after day on this beautiful stage", 2023).

She also curated the group exhibition In Plain Sight (2022), a collaboration with artists and community advisors exploring institutional archives, collections, and absences.

Gary Simmons's exhibition "The Engine Room" (2021), curated by Momin, transformed a gallery space into a hybrid performance-installation that included a live musician residency program. According to the museum, the show was designed "as both a private laboratory and a public stage" and featured site-specific programming that connected to Seattle’s musical and social history.

A review in CAA Reviews described In Plain Sight as “a coherent and compelling display of artist-curated masks, archives, and documents... [that] brings forward alternative frameworks of memory, lineage, and visibility.”

In 2023, Momin curated the site-specific exhibition Sarah Cain: Day after day on this beautiful stage at the Henry Art Gallery. The show transformed the museum's two-level gallery into a monumental painted environment, with critics noting its immersive interplay of light, color, and architectural space.

Through these exhibitions, Momin emphasized how materiality, scale, color, and site-specificity can convey emotional resonance while advancing bold aesthetic and conceptual narratives—hallmarks of her curatorial approach.

== Bronx Museum of the Arts ==
In July 2025, Momin was announced as the next Director and Chief Curator of the Bronx Museum of the Arts, succeeding Klaudio Rodriguez.

The appointment was welcomed as a sign of renewed institutional ambition. The New York Times noted that her leadership “reaffirmed the Bronx Museum’s commitment to equity, experimentation and community engagement after a period of transition.”

Describing her vision, Momin told The New York Times she aims to “expand the museum’s reach … to celebrate the richness of this borough” and focus on bridging “local and global” art narratives.

Observers and community leaders cited by the article praised her for her history of “inclusive programming” and “bringing new curatorial perspectives to institutions in Los Angeles and Seattle,” pointing to her proven ability to merge institutional innovation with social relevance

== Publications and teaching ==
Momin has contributed extensively to artist monographs and exhibition catalogues. She was one of ten international curators featured in Ice Cream: Contemporary Art in Culture (Phaidon, 2007), profiling emerging artists of the 2000s.

Her writing appears in publications on artists including Alex Katz (Phaidon, 2014), Terence Koh (D.A.P., 2008), Barnaby Furnas (Rizzoli, 2007), and Ellen Harvey: Mirror (Hatje Cantz, 2005).

She co-authored Whitney Museum of American Art at Altria: 25 Years (Whitney Museum, 2008) with Whitney director Adam D. Weinberg. In 2012, she edited the first monograph on artist Sarah Cain, featuring contributions by Andrew Berardini, Tara McDowell, Franklin Sirmans, and the artist.

Other editorial projects include Six Impossible Things Before Breakfast: The Impossibility of Translation (2007), a curated book with Olga Adelantado, and No Ordinary Sanctity (2005), produced for the Deutsche Bank project space in Salzburg.

Momin served as Adjunct Professor of Contemporary Art for the Williams College Semester in New York program in 2007 and 2008, and was later an Affiliate Professor of Art at the University of Washington’s School of Art, Art History and Design during her tenure at the Henry Art Gallery.

== Legacy ==
Shamim M. Momin is recognized for substantially expanding the scope of contemporary curatorial practice, particularly by elevating interdisciplinary, emotionally resonant, and performative art within major institutions and public programs. As co‑founder of LAND, she organized over 100 public art commissions by 300 artists, notably helping to pave the way for site-based and non-traditional exhibitions.

In 2008, The New York Times described Momin as “one of the most watched young curators in the country,” highlighting both her institutional exhibitions and “the social presence she brings to them.”

Her work with LAND was credited in 2015 for “helping shape the new L.A. renaissance,” via bold public art projects that expanded the public’s engagement with contemporary art beyond conventional spaces.

Upon her selection as Director of the Bronx Museum in 2025, The New York Times noted that “her curatorial choices have often anticipated larger aesthetic and political shifts in the art world.”
