= Wivina Demeester =

Belgian politician

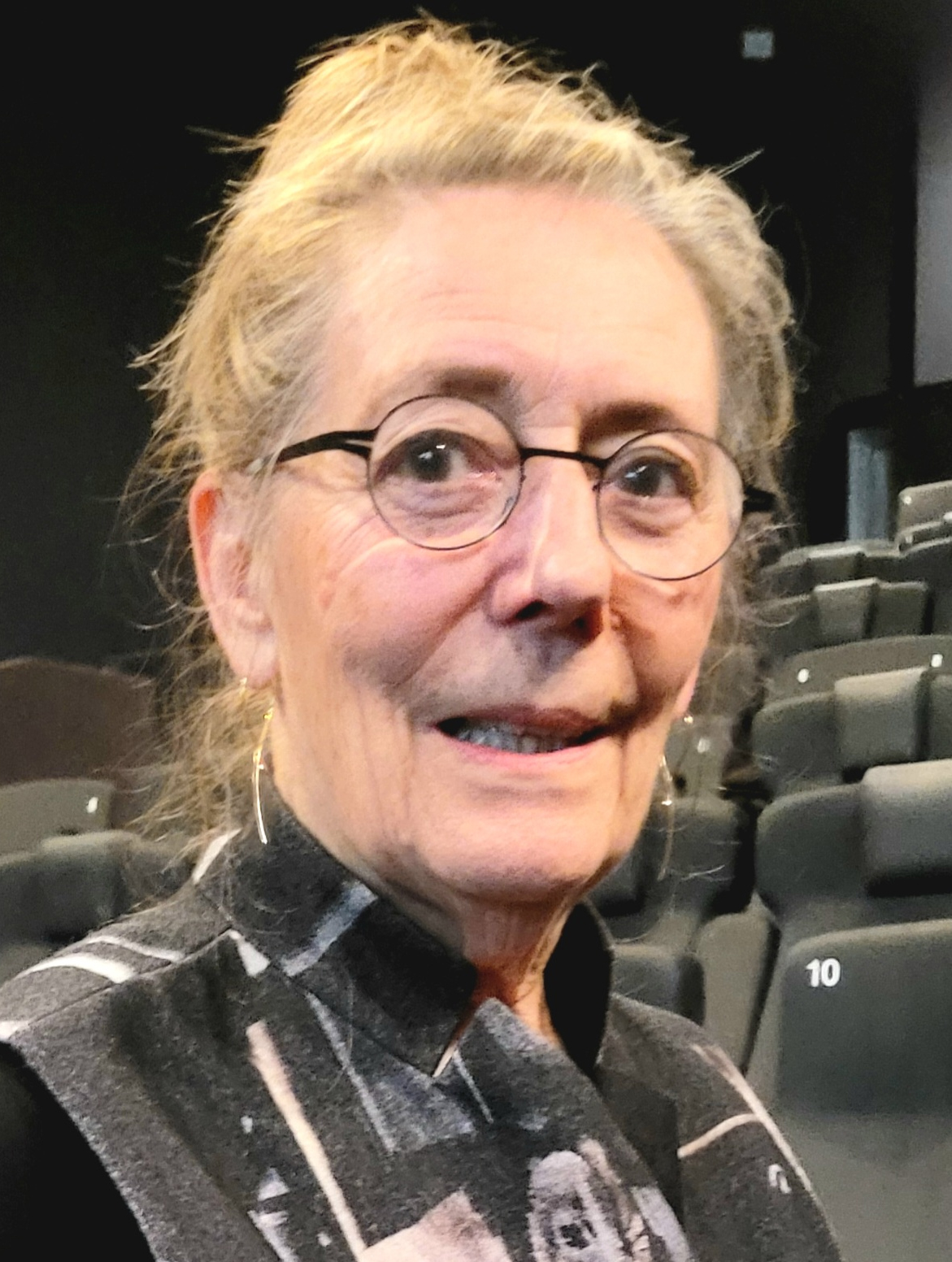

Member of the Chamber of Representatives
- In office 1974–1995
- Constituency: Antwerp

Personal details
- Born: 13 December 1943 (age 82) Aalst, Belgium
- Party: Christian Democratic and Flemish (CD&V)

Wivina Demeester-De Meyer (born 13 December 1943) is a Belgian politician who served as a Member of the Flemish Parliament and its predecessor bodies between 1974 and 1995 and 1999 and 2004; she also held various ministerial posts in the national (i.e., Belgian) and Flemish governments.

== Life ==
Wivinia Demeester-De Meyer was born in Aalst on 13 December 1943. Throughout her political career, she has been a member of the Flemish successor to the Christian Social Party (CVP) and, after 2001, its successor, the Christen-Democratisch en Vlaams (CD&V) party. In 1974, she became a Representative of Antwerp in the Belgian Chamber of Representatives and was re-elected in 1977, 1978 and 1981, 1985, 1987 and 1991; her final term came to an end in 1995. She held a double mandate as a member of the Cultural Council for the Dutch Cultural Community from 1974 to 1980, when that body became the Flemish Council; she remained a member until 1995. Between 1999 and 2004, she represented Antwerp on the Council's successor, the Flemish Parliament. She also served on Zoersel City Council for eighteen years before her retirement in 2006.

In the meantime, she held a number of ministerial posts. Her first appointment, lasting from November 1985 to May 1988, was as State Secretary for Health and Disability Policy. In September 1988, she became State Secretary for Finance, serving until September 1991, when she became Minister for the Budget and Science Policy. Briefly in January 1992, she was appointed Minister of Finance and Budget, Internal Affairs, Welfare and Family, but from February until October of that year, she was Community Minister for Finance and Budget, Health Institutions, Welfare and Family. After that, she was Flemish Minister for the same portfolio, serving until June 1995, when she became Flemish Minister for Finance, Budget and Health Policy, a post she left in July 1999.
