= Henriette Huldisch =

- Born: 1973 (age 52–53); Hamburg, West Germany
- Citizenship: American
- Education: New York University Tisch School of the Arts; Humboldt University of Berlin
- Occupation: Art curator
- Employers: Whitney Museum (2001–2008); Hamburger Bahnhof (2010–2014); List Visual Arts Center (2014–2019); Walker Art Center (2019–present)

Henriette Huldisch is a German-born American curator of contemporary art. She is currently the Chief Curator and Director of Curatorial Affairs at the Walker Art Center in Minneapolis, Minnesota. Prior to that, she was the Director of Exhibitions at the MIT List Visual Arts Center in Boston, Massachusetts.

== Education ==
Huldisch, an expert on film and video, started working in the museum world in 2001 immediately after she graduated NYU's Film Studies program. Originally from Hamburg, Germany, Huldisch came to the United States after receiving a first Master's degree in American studies at Berlin's Humboldt University.

== Career ==
From 2001 to 2008, Huldisch was an Assistant Curator at the Whitney Museum, where she co-curated the 2008 Whitney Biennial with Shamim M. Momin. Arthur C. Danto, reviewing the Biennial in The Nation, praised Huldisch's characterisation of 'Lessness. An Art of Smaller, Slower, and Less' in her catalog essay as "well said and wise". From 2010 to 2014, Huldisch was a curator at the Hamburger Bahnhof contemporary art museum in Berlin, Germany where she curated many exhibitions including an Anthony McCall survey in 2012, a show of Harun Farocki, and "Body Pressure: Sculpture since the 1960s," which she co-curated with Lisa Marei Schmidt.

At the MIT List Visual Arts Center, Huldisch has curated "An Inventory of Shimmers: Objects of Intimacy in Contemporary Art" (2017), an exhibition of conceptual art which "plugs into perceptions of love, trust, and care. ... It provokes discomfort and wonder in equal parts, but shies away from sentimentality." In 2018, Huldisch curated Before Projection: VIDEO SCULPTURE 1974 – 1995 and edited the exhibition book. The show brought together works by Andrea Büttner, Sophie Calle, Alejandro Cesarco, Jason Dodge, Felix Gonzalez-Torres, Antonia Hirsch, Jill Magid, Park McArthur, Lisa Tan, Erika Vogt, Susanne M. Winterling, and Anicka Yi. It was described in an Artforum review as "eye-opening", "one of the finest moving-image gallery exhibitions in recent memory .. [which] conveys the history of the medium with an all-too-rare precision, mingling canonical names with rediscoveries." An Art Monthly reviewer noted that Huldisch was making "a point .. about the feminist potential of the nascent technology", and commented that "The greater achievement of 'Before Projection' may be that, in its bringing together of a sort of family of artworks under the banner of video sculpture, it demonstrates how video dealt a blow to concepts of medium specificity and patrilineal avant-garde progress at the same time".
