= Barbara Haskell =

American art historian and museum curator (born 1946)

- Born: 1946 (age 79–80); San Diego, California, U.S.
- Education: University of California, Los Angeles (BA)
- Occupations: Art historian; museum curator

Barbara Haskell (born 1946 in San Diego, California) is an American art historian and a museum curator. She is currently a curator at the Whitney Museum of American Art (WMAA), where she has worked since 1975. She previously worked at the San Francisco Museum of Art and Pasadena Museum, and was hired at the WMAA by Thomas N. Armstrong III. She holds a BA (1969) from the University of California, Los Angeles, and is married to former Bard College President Leon Botstein.

Her area of expertise is early to mid-20th-century painting and sculpture, including American modernists, Abstract Expressionists, and Pop artists. She is the founder and leader of the American Fellows, a patrons group for major donors to the Whitney.

Among the landmark thematic exhibitions she has curated are BLAM! The Explosion of Pop, Minimalism and Performance 1958–1964 (1984), The American Century: Art & Culture 1900–1950 (1999), and Vida Americana: Mexican Muralists Remake American Art, 1925–1945 (2020). In addition, she has curated retrospectives and authored accompanying scholarly monographs on a range of early-20th-century and post-war American artists, including H.C. Westermann (1978), Marsden Hartley (1980), Milton Avery (1982), Ralston Crawford (1985), Charles Demuth (1987), Red Grooms (1987), Donald Judd (1988), Burgoyne Diller (1990), Agnes Martin (1992), Joseph Stella (1994), Edward Steichen (2000), Elie Nadelman (2003), Oscar Bluemner (2005), Georgia O'Keeffe (2009), Lyonel Feininger (2011), Robert Indiana (2013), Stuart Davis (2016), and Grant Wood (2018).

== Major publications and exhibitions ==
- Claes Oldenburg: Object into Monument. Pasadena Art Museum, California, 1971.
- Larry Bell. Pasadena Art Museum, California, 1972.
- John Mason: Ceramic Sculpture. Pasadena Art Museum, California, 1974.
- Arthur Dove. New York Graphic Society, Ltd., Boston, Massachusetts, 1974.
- H.C. Westermann. Whitney Museum of American Art, New York, 1978.
- Marsden Hartley. New York University Press in association with The Whitney Museum of American Art, New York, 1980.
- Milton Avery. Harper & Row Publishers in association with The Whitney Museum of American Art, New York, 1982.
- BLAM! The Explosion of Pop, Minimalism and Performance 1958–1964. W.W. Norton & Company, Inc. in association with The Whitney Museum of American Art, 1984.
- Ralston Crawford. Whitney Museum of American Art, New York, 1985.
- Charles Demuth. Harry N. Abrams, Inc. in association with The Whitney Museum of American Art, New York, 1987.
- Donald Judd. W.W. Norton in association with The Whitney Museum of American Art, New York, 1988.
- Red Grooms: Ruckus Rodeo. Harry N. Abrams Inc., New York, 1988.
- Burgoyne Diller, Whitney Museum of American Art, New York, 1990.
- Yoko Ono: Arias and Objects. Salt Lake City: Peregrine Smith Books, 1991.
- Agnes Martin. Whitney Museum of American Art, New York, 1992.
- Joseph Stella. Whitney Museum of American Art, New York, 1994.
- Milton Avery: The Metaphysics of Color. Neuberger Museum of Art, 1994.
- Georgia O'Keeffe, Works on Paper. Museum of Fine Arts, Museum of New Mexico, Santa Fe, 1995.
- The American Century: Art and Culture 1900–1950. W.W. Norton in association with The Whitney Museum of American Art, New York, 1999.
- Edward Steichen. Whitney Museum of American Art, New York, 2000.
- Elie Nadelman: Sculptor of Modern Life. Whitney Museum of American Art, New York, 2003.
- Oscar Bluemner: A Passion for Color. Whitney Museum of American Art, New York, 2005.
- Modern Life: Edward Hopper and His Time. Bucerius Kunst Forum, Hamburg, 2009.
- Georgia O'Keeffe: Abstraction. Whitney Museum of American Art, New York, 2009.
- Lyonel Feininger: At the Edge of the World. Whitney Museum of American Art, New York, 2011.
- Robert Indiana: Beyond LOVE. Whitney Museum of American Art, New York, 2013.
- "The Legacy of the Armory Show: Fiasco or Transformation." The Armory Show at 100: Modernism and Revolution. New-York Historical Society, 2013.
- Stuart Davis: In Full Swing. National Gallery of Art, Washington, Whitney Museum of American Art, New York, and Delmonico Books, an imprint of Prestel Publishing, Munich, London, and New York, 2016.
- Grant Wood: American Gothic and Other Fables. Whitney Museum of American Art, New York, 2018.
- Vida Americana: Mexican Muralists Remake American Art, 1925–1945. Whitney Museum of American Art, New York, and Yale University Press, New Haven and London, 2020.
- At the Dawn of a New Age: Early Twentieth-Century American Modernism. Whitney Museum of American Art, New York, 2022 - 2023.

== Awards ==
- Henry Allen Moe Prize awarded to catalogues of distinction in the arts, for the monograph Charles Demuth, 1987.
- Lawrence A. Fleischman Award for Scholarly Excellence in the Field of American Art History, from the Archives of American Art, 2003.
- 2024 Frederic Church Award for extraordinary curatorial contributions to American art and culture, from The Olana Partnership, 2024.
- 2024 Henry Allen Moe Prize awarded to catalogues of distinction in the arts, for the catalogue Vida Americana: Mexican Muralists Remake American Art, 1925-1945, from the Fenimore Art Museum, 2024.
