= Donna De Salvo =

American curator

Donna De Salvo is an American curator who was appointed the Dia Art Foundation's senior adjunct curator of special projects. She previously served as the Chief Curator and Deputy Director for Programs at the Whitney Museum of American Art in New York.

== Career ==
From 1981 to 1986 De Salvo was a curator at the Dia Art Foundation in New York.

De Salvo served as Senior Curator at Tate Modern in London, where she worked from 1999 to 2004. During her time at Tate Modern, she organized exhibitions on Giorgio Morandi, Andy Warhol, and one of the Turbine Hall commissions, "The Unilever Series: Anish Kapoor (2002)."

De Salvo came to the Whitney in 2004 and became the first to become promoted to Chief Curator in 2006. In this capacity, she organized exhibitions on artists like Warhol, Hélio Oiticica, Michael Heizer, and Steve McQueen, among others. In July 2015, she became the Deputy Director for International Initiatives at the Whitney, a new position created to source and cultivate international relationships for the museum.

In addition to her roles at the Whitney, De Salvo was also an adjunct curator at the Andy Warhol Museum and in 2005 helped curate an exhibition of paintings by Ed Ruscha for the American pavilion at the Venice Biennale.

== Writings ==
De Salvo is the author of Staging Surrealism, a 1997 book about the surrealist art movement.
