= Adam D. Weinberg =

Art museum curator and director

Adam D. Weinberg is an art museum curator. He was the Alice Pratt Brown Director of the Whitney Museum of American Art for 20 years, from October 1, 2003 to October 31, 2023.

== Education ==
He holds a BA from Brandeis University and a master's degree from the Visual Studies Workshop, the State University of New York at Buffalo.

== Career ==
Adam D. Weinberg has been a prominent figure in the arts since the 1980s, when he started his career at the Walker Art Center in Minneapolis as Director of Education and Assistant Curator. He joined the Whitney in 1989, initially as Director of its Equitable Center Branch at 52nd and Seventh Avenue. He was hired by Thomas N. Armstrong III. After three years as the artistic and program director of the American Center France in Paris, he returned to the Whitney in 1993 as Curator of the Permanent Collection and was elevated to Senior Curator in 1998. He served as the Mary Stripp and R. Crosby Kemper Director of the Addison Gallery of American Art at Phillips Academy, Andover from 1999 until 2003 until he was appointed as the Alice Pratt Brown Director of the Whitney in October 2003. He stepped down from the role after 20 years in October 2023 and was succeeded by Scott Rothkopf.

During Weinberg's career he has curated numerous exhibitions on artists such as Edward Hopper, Richard Pousette-Dart, Arshile Gorky, Sol LeWitt, Isamu Noguchi, Alex Katz, Robert Mangold, and Frank Stella. He has also curated thematic and collection-based exhibitions among them Vanishing Presence; On the Line: The New Color photojournalism and the series Views from Abroad: European Perspectives on American Art; In a Classical Vein: Works from the Whitney Permanent Collection and Ideas and Objects; Selected Drawings and Sculptures from the Whitney Collection. He has organized numerous public projects with artists such as Christian Boltanski, Mark Dion, Nam June Paik, Laurie Simmons, Lorna Simpson, Jessica Stockholder and Nari Ward.

Weinberg has authored numerous catalogues and essays on artists ranging from Martin Puryear, Richard Artschwager and Jack Whitten to Sol LeWitt, Richard Tuttle, Robert Adams and Ursula von Rydingsvard, lectured widely, and been a grant panelist for federal, state, city, and private foundations as well as international governmental and private organizations.

Under his directorship, the Whitney presented over 300 exhibitions including nine editions of the Whitney Biennial and large-scale installations of the permanent collection, including the inaugural exhibition in the Downtown Whitney, America is Hard to See. Major Whitney-organized exhibitions explored the works of dozens of artists—senior (such as Frank Stella, Carmen Herrera, and Lawrence Weiner), mid-career (such as Julie Mehretu, Roni Horn, and Lorna Simpson), and historic (such as Gordon Matta-Clark, Georgia O'Keeffe, and Edward Hopper).

In 2015, the Museum opened its new 220,000-square-foot building designed by Renzo Piano in New York's Meatpacking District, doubling the size of its exhibition space as well as providing state-of-the-art theater, education and conservation facilities. Since that time, the Whitney has increased its annual attendance from 400,000 to 1.2 million (pre-pandemic), expanded its award-winning educational programs, and dramatically enlarged its performance program. Since 2015, the Museum under Weinberg's leadership increased its collection endowment more than ten-fold and brought in nearly 4,000 works in all media by a diversity of practitioners into the permanent collection including Carmen Herrera, Norman Lewis, Archibald Motley, and a major collection of works by Roy Lichtenstein.

Under his direction, the Whitney's commitment to living artists has been paramount with an expansion of its emerging artist exhibitions and programs as well as the introduction of the inaugural, comprehensive artist payment program (including the first museum to introduce honoraria for artists displaying works in the collection). The Museum also reaffirmed the central importance of its fifty-plus year Independent Study Program through the establishment of a permanent home for the Program at the Roy Lichtenstein Studio—a gift of Dorothy Lichtenstein—and its first artist-in-residence apartment and studio which has been added to the Lichtenstein Studio. Weinberg has also been recognized for his interviews with leading artists of our generation. Among them are John Baldessari, Dawoud Bey, Christian Boltanski, Alex Katz, Jeff Koons, Glenn Ligon, Julie Mehretu, Jason Moran, Elizabeth Murray, Claes Oldenburg, Catherine Opie, James Rosenquist, Martha Rosler, Susan Rothenberg, Ed Ruscha, Frank Stella, Hiroshi Sugimoto, Sarah Sze, Bill Viola, Kara Walker, and Lawrence Weiner.

As "the artist's museum," a site for art presented in "real time," the Whitney has historically been a platform for dialogue and controversy. Weinberg's tenure has been no exception. "It's not that we court controversy. But to believe in the work of the present is to believe there are alternative ways of seeing the world—and that's a radical act, because it's saying the status quo is not the only way things can be." Most controversies focus on the political/social aspects related to the artworks and artist representation. In 2019 the Whitney faced criticism and protest for including, what was thought to be by many, a racially-insensitive painting of Emmett Till by artist Dana Schutz in its 2017 Biennial. Other controversies included protests from staff and the public in 2018 over what were considered the unethical business interests of one of the Whitney's Trustees, Warren Kanders. The protests led to Kanders’ resignation from the Board. In 2021, he led the realization of Day's End, the permanent, public sculpture by artist David Hammons on the Hudson River waterfront.

As of mid-2022, Weinberg serves as a board member of Storm King Art Center; the American Academy in Rome, the Terra Foundation for American Art, the Star of Hope Foundation and has been a past board member of the American Federation of Arts, Andy Warhol Foundation for the Visual Arts, Colby College Art Museum, the Tang Museum at Skidmore College and the Williamstown Art Conservation Center. He is a member of the Advisory Committee for the Archives of American Art, the Scientific Committees of the Sebançi Museum in Istanbul and The Art Mill Museum in Doha and a member of the director selection commission of the MADRE Museum in Naple. He served as the Chair of the Visiting Committee for the Harvard University Art Museum, a member of the Art Committee of Madison Square Park Conservancy and as a member of the Committee of Selection of The Pollock-Krasner Foundation.

=== Degrees and awards ===
Weinberg holds a BA from Brandeis University and an MFA from the Visual Studies Workshop, SUNY Buffalo. He has received honorary PhDs from Skidmore College, Colby College, Hamilton College and the Pratt Institute. He is a Fellow of the American Academy of Arts and Sciences and has received numerous awards including the Merit Award from the American Institute of Architects, the Rudin Award for Exemplary Service to New York City from New York University, and the Award for Distinguished Service to the Arts from the American Academy of Arts and Letters. In 2015, he was awarded the Insignia of Officer of the Order of Arts and Letters by the French government.
