= John Hanhardt =

American author and art historian (born 1945)

John Hanhart
- Born: February 13, 1945 (age 81); Rochester, New York, U.S.
- Education: University of Rochester; New York University
- Occupations: Author; art historian; museum curator
- Years active: 1970–present
- Employers: Museum of Modern Art (MoMA); Walker Art Center; Whitney Museum of American Art; Solomon R. Guggenheim Museum; Smithsonian American Art Museum
- Known for: Establishing film and media arts in museums, Nam June Paik scholarship
- Notable work: The Worlds of Nam June Paik (2003); We Are in Open Circuits (2019)

John G. Hanhardt (born February 13, 1945) is an American author, art historian, and curator of film and media arts. Hanhardt was the Consulting Senior Curator for Media Arts at the Smithsonian Museum of American Art, where he developed exhibitions, collections, and archives in film and the media arts. He is considered to be one of the leading scholars on video artist Nam June Paik.

== Personal life ==
Hanhardt grew up in Rochester, New York. He received his bachelor's degree from the University of Rochester in 1967, and his master's degree and additional graduate work (ABD) in cinema studies from New York University in 1970.

Hanhardt has written many books and in 2019 came out with a new book,We Are in Open Circuits- Writings by Nam June Paik

== Career ==
Hanhardt's expansive curatorial practice spans three decades. Hanhardt began his career in the department of Film and Video at the Museum of Modern Art. He then went on to establish the first Film and Media Arts collection at the Walker Art Museum. Following his success at the Walker, Hanhardt was appointed Curator and Head of the Film and Video department at the Whitney Museum of American Art in 1974. At the Whitney, Hanhardt was the director of the New American Film and Video Series which surveyed independent film and the emergence of video as an art form. He is also responsible for developing the museum's video art installation collection. In 1996, Hanhardt was appointed Senior Curator of Film and Media Arts at the Solomon R. Guggenheim Museum where he developed “its international exhibition program, as well as its video installation art collection." In 2006, he was appointed as the Consulting Senior Curator for Film and Media Arts and the Nam June Paik Art Center at the Smithsonian American Art Museum.

In addition to his museum experience, Hanhardt has published, lectured, and taught extensively on film and media art. He has held adjunct teaching positions at Columbia University, Harvard University, the School of the Art Institute of Chicago, the Rhode Island School of Design, Middlebury College, and Williams College.

In 2013, Bard College acquired Hanhardt's archive, vast collection of records documenting Hanhardt’s curatorial practice within five major art institutions in the United States.

== Exhibitions curated ==
- Re-Visions: Projects and Proposals in Film and Video (1969)
- Nam June Paik (1982)
- Blam! The Explosion of Pop, Minimalism, and Performance 1958–1964 (1984)
- The Films of Andy Warhol (1988)
- Video Art: Expanded Forms (1988)
- Yoko Ono: Films (1989)
- Co-curator, Image World: Art and Media Culture (1989–90)
- Beat Culture and the New America: 1950–1965 (1995)
- Robert Frank: Moving Out (1995)
- Project Director of the Andy Warhol Film Project (1988–present)
- Nam June Paik: Global Visionary (2012)
- Friendly Witnesses: The Worlds of Warren Sonbert (1999) with Jon Gartenberg

== Publications ==
As a writer, critic, and editor, Hanhardt has been a contributor to numerous exhibition catalogues, journals, and other arts publications. He has written and co-written several books on Korean American video artist Nam June Paik, some of which include The Worlds of Nam June Paik (2003), Nam June Paik: Global Groove (2004), and Nam June Paik: Global Visionary (2012). He is the editor of Video Culture: A Critical Investigation (1986).

== Awards ==
In 1993, Hanhardt was the recipient of the Peter Norton Family Foundation Curator's Grant for outstanding curatorial work.
