= Anthony Elms =

American independent curator, writer, & artist

- Education: Michigan State University (BFA); University of Chicago (MFA)
- Occupations: Curator; writer; artist
- Employer: Institute of Contemporary Art, Philadelphia
- Known for: Co-curating the 2014 Whitney Biennial
- Title: Chief Curator, ICA Philadelphia

Anthony Elms is an American curator, writer, and artist based in Philadelphia. In 2015, Elms was named Chief Curator at the ICA Philadelphia.

== Career ==
=== Education ===
Elms received a BFA in painting from Michigan State University and an MFA from the University of Chicago.

=== Curatorial and art practice ===
Elms spent over 15 years in Chicago, Illinois, working as an exhibition preparator, a freelance writer, and a curator; as well as making fine art. As of 2013, Elms continued to exhibit as an artist. Elms was Assistant Director of Gallery 400 at the University of Illinois at Chicago for six years. In 2011, Elms joined the University of Pennsylvania's Institute of Contemporary Art as an associate curator. At the ICA, Elms organized "White Petals Surround Your Yellow Heart" (2013), which included artists working with themes of adornment, such as Lynda Benglis, Karen Kilimnik, Zoe Leonard, Paulina Olowska, and Frances Stark.

In 2014, Elms co-curated the 2014 Whitney Biennial, with Stuart Comer and Michelle Grabner at the Whitney Museum of American Art. Each curator was given a floor. Elms worked with artist Zoe Leonard on her contribution to the Whitney Biennial, a room-sized camera obscura, which won her the $100,000 Bucksbaum Award, given to one artist in the show every Biennial since 2000. The floor which Elms organized included works by Terry Adkins, Elijah Burgher, My Barbarian, Susan Howe, Charlemagne Palestine, Allan Sekula, and others.

Elms worked as an associate producer for the 2011 PERFORMA visual art biennial.

=== Writing and editing ===
Elms edits and is the curator of WhiteWalls, an alternative space for artists' publication projects founded in the 1970s. White Walls periodically publishes books and distributes them through the University of Chicago Press. Elms's writings have been published in various periodicals, including Afterall, ART PAPERS, Cakewalk, Art Asia Pacific, Modern Painters, and New Art Examiner.
