= Richard Bosman =

American artist

- Born: 1944 (age 81–82); Madras, India
- Education: New York Studio School of Drawing, Painting and Sculpture; Skowhegan School of Painting and Sculpture; Byam Shaw School of Art
- Occupations: painter, printmaker, educator, illustrator
- Movement: Neo-expressionism
- Website: rbosman.com

Richard Bosman (born 1944) is an American artist, educator, and illustrator. Bosman is best known for his paintings and prints. His work is often related to crime, adventure, and disaster narratives; rural Americana; and nature and domestic themes. He is associated with the Neo-expressionist movement of the late 1970s and early 1980s. Bosman was a member of Colab, the New York artist collective founded in 1977, and participated in the group's influential, “Times Square Show” (1980).

Bosman's early paintings and prints drew on pop culture representations of violence and romance, including pulp fiction book illustration. More recently he has created woodcuts depicting turbulent seascapes, volcanoes, Adirondack scenes and other imagery, displaying what New York Times critic Roberta Smith called a “penchant for parody-homage” toward his subjects. Writing in the Times, Smith stated: “Mr. Bosman's luxuriant, dashed-off brushwork brings a quality at once antic and powerful to expanses of trees, water and wood grain and staring deer, both living and stuffed.” He is living and working in the Hudson Valley of New York State.

== Early life and education ==
Richard Bosman was born in 1944 in Madras, India (now known as Chennai); and was raised in Egypt and Australia. His mother is Australian, and his father is Dutch and worked as a sea captain.

Bosman attended the Bryam Shaw School of Painting and Drawing (now known as the Byam Shaw School of Art) in London, from 1964 to 1969. He settled in New York City in 1969, attending the New York Studio School until 1971. At the Studio School Bosman's instructors included Philip Guston and Alex Katz. Bosman studied at the Skowhegan School of Painting and Sculpture, in Skowhegan, Maine, in 1970.

== Exhibitions and collections ==
For several decades, Bosman's work has been exhibited internationally and is included in numerous public art and museum collections. In 1980, Brooke Alexander Gallery in New York hosted Bosman's first solo exhibition. His work was shown regularly at Brooke Alexander Gallery from 1980 to 1994; and at Elizabeth Harris Gallery, New York, from 2003 to 2018.

Bosman's paintings and prints have been exhibited in solo shows at The Amon Carter Museum of American Art, Fort Worth, Texas; Galleria Toselli, Milan; and William Mora Galleries, Melbourne, Australia; among others. His work has been shown in group exhibitions at galleries and institutions including the Museum of Modern Art, New York; the Walker Art Center, Minneapolis; the Whitney Museum of American Art, New York; and the Brooklyn Museum.

Bosman's works are held in the permanent collections of the Museum of Modern Art; the Metropolitan Museum of Art; the National Gallery of Art, Washington, D.C.; the Bibliothèque Nationale de France, Paris; the Museo Rufino Tamayo, Mexico City; the Museum of Contemporary Art, Los Angeles; Smithsonian American Art Museum; and the Whitney Museum.

== Publications ==
- Mather, Cotton; Greenleaf Whittier, John; Hawthorne, Nathaniel; Thoreau, Henry David (1987). Captivity Narrative of Hannah Duston. Richard Bosman (illustrations done in woodcut). San Francisco, California: Arion Press. ISBN 9780910457125.
- Giorno, John (1985). Grasping at Emptiness: Poems. Richard Bosman (illustrations). New York City, New York: Kulchur Foundation. ISBN 9780936538112.
- Greenwald, Ted (1982). Exit the Face: Poems. Richard Bosman (illustrations). New York City, New York: Museum of Modern Art. ISBN 9780870706714.
