= Michelle Grabner =

American artist, curator & critic (born 1962)

- Born: 1962 (age 63–64); Oshkosh, Wisconsin, U.S.
- Education: University of Wisconsin-Milwaukee (B.F.A.); University of Wisconsin-Milwaukee (M.A.); Northwestern University (M.F.A.)
- Known for: painting
- Awards: Guggenheim Fellowship for Visual Art
- Website: www.michellegrabner.com

Michelle Grabner (born 1962 in Oshkosh, Wisconsin) is an artist, curator, and critic based in Wisconsin. She is the Crown Family Professor of Art at the School of the Art Institute of Chicago where she has taught since 1996. She has curated several important exhibitions, including the 2014 Whitney Biennial at the Whitney Museum of American Art along with Anthony Elms and Stuart Comer, and FRONT International, the 2016 Portland Biennial at the Oregon Contemporary, a triennial exhibition in Cleveland, Ohio in 2018. In 2014, Grabner was named one of the 100 most powerful women in art and in 2019, she was named a 2019 National Academy of Design's Academician, a lifetime honor. In 2021, Grabner was named a Guggenheim Fellow by The John Simon Guggenheim Memorial Foundation. In 2024 Grabner was inducted into the Wisconsin Academy of Art and Science.

== Life ==
Grabner received a B.F.A. (painting and drawing) in 1984 and an M.A. in art history in 1987 from the University of Wisconsin–Milwaukee. Her MA thesis and exhibition was titled "Postmodernism: A Spectacle of Reflexivity" and included work by Richard Prince, Sherrie Levine, and Kay Rosen among others. She received an M.F.A. from Northwestern University in 1990. She is the Crown Family Professor of Art at the School of the Art Institute of Chicago, where she has been teaching since 1996. In addition, Grabner has also held teaching appointments at The University of Wisconsin-Madison, Cranbrook Academy of Art, Yale Norfolk, Bard College's Milton Avery Graduate School of Arts, and Skowhegan School of Painting and Sculpture, Maine.

== Work ==
Her work is in the collection of the Art Museum of West Virginia University, Morgantown; Walker Art Center, Minneapolis; the Milwaukee Art Museum; the Museum of Contemporary Art, Chicago; DaimlerChrysler Collection, Berlin; Musée d'art moderne Grand-Duc Jean, Luxembourg; Smithsonian American Art Museum, Washington, DC; the Indianapolis Museum of Art; the Allen Memorial Art Museum, Oberlin, OH; the Madison Museum of Contemporary Art, Madison, WI; the Museum of Fine Arts, Boston, MA; the RISD MUSEUM, Providence, RI; the Sheldon Museum of Art, Lincoln, NE; Mount Holyoke College Art Museum, South Hadley, MA; the Wellin Museum of Art, Hamilton College, Clinton, NY; the Bates College, Lewiston, ME; and the Victoria and Albert Museum, London among others. The Museum of Contemporary Art Cleveland presented her first solo retrospective, Michelle Grabner, "I Work From Home", November 1, 2013 - February 16, 2014.

Grabner co-curated the 2014 Whitney Museum Biennial and curated the 2016 Portland Biennial. She was the Artistic Director for the inaugural exhibition, FRONT International, the 2018 Cleveland Triennial for Contemporary Art, titled "An American City."
