= Stuart Comer =

American art curator and writer

- Education: Carleton College (BA); Royal College of Art (MA)
- Occupations: Curator; writer
- Employer: Museum of Modern Art
- Known for: Co-curating the 2014 Whitney Biennial
- Title: Chief Curator of Media and Performance Art, MoMA

Stuart Comer is an American art curator and writer who is currently Chief Curator of Media and Performance Art at The Museum of Modern Art in New York City. He was co-curator of the 2014 Biennial at the Whitney Museum of American Art, alongside Michelle Grabner and Anthony Elms.

== Life and career ==
Comer received a BA degree in art history from Carleton College in Minnesota and an MA in curatorial studies from the Royal College of Art, London. He began his career as a book buyer at the Museum of Contemporary Art in Los Angeles.

Before taking his position at The Museum of Modern Art, he served as the first Curator of Film at Tate Modern in London. His projects at Tate Modern included the work of Tony Conrad, Nan Goldin, Barbara Hammer, Derek Jarman, Djibril Diop Mambéty, Daria Martin & Zeena Parkins, Shuji Terayama, Throbbing Gristle and Jennifer West. In 2012, when Tate Modern opened a new exhibition space housed in disused former oil tanks, Comer acted as co-curator of the opening festival of live and time-based media that included the work of Boris Charmatz, Anne Teresa de Keersmaeker, Ei Arakawa, Tania Bruguera and Aldo Tambellini, among others. While at Tate Modern, he was responsible for overseeing the acquisition of work for the museum's film and video collection, adding key works by Ant Farm, Cory Arcangel, Charles Atlas, Peter Campus, Oskar Fischinger, Jack Goldstein, Mike Kelley, KwieKulik, Jonas Mekas, Paul McCarthy, Lis Rhodes, Allan Sekula, Apichatpong Weerasethakul and Akram Zaatari. From 2002 until 2004, Comer was also Curator of Public Programmes at Tate Modern. He was co-curator of the Lyon Biennial in 2007.

== Publications ==
Comer has contributed writing to publications such as Artforum, Frieze, Afterall, Mousse, Parkett and Art Review, and has written on the work of artists Andrea Fraser, John Smith, David Lamelas, Tom Burr, Akram Zaatari, Sharon Lockhart, Bik Van Der Pol, Mark Morrisroe, and Gillian Wearing. He is the editor of Film and Video Art (2009), published by Tate.
