= Marcia Tucker =

American art historian, critic and curator (1940–2006)

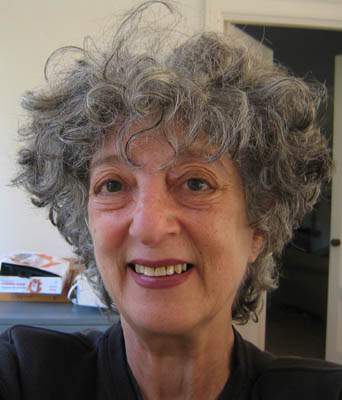
- Marcia Tucker
- Born: April 11, 1940; Brooklyn, New York, U.S.
- Died: October 17, 2006 (aged 66); Santa Barbara, California, U.S.
- Education: Connecticut College (BA); École du Louvre
- Occupations: Curator and Art Historian

Marcia Tucker (née Silverman; April 11, 1940 – October 17, 2006) was an American art historian, art critic and curator. In 1977 she founded the New Museum of Contemporary Art, a museum dedicated to innovative art and artistic practice in New York City, which she ran as the director until 1999.

== Early life and education ==
Tucker was born on April 11, 1940, in Brooklyn, New York. In 1961 she earned a Bachelor of Arts degree from Connecticut College, where she studied theatre and art. Tucker spent her junior year studying at the École du Louvre, in Paris. Her first job was as a secretary of the Museum of Modern Art; however, she soon quit after being asked to sharpen too many pencils.

== Career ==
In 1969, Tucker became the Curator of Painting and Sculpture at the Whitney Museum of American Art. She held this position until 1976 and she organized major exhibitions of the work of Bruce Nauman, Lee Krasner, Joan Mitchell, Richard Tuttle, and Jack Tworkov among others. In 1975, Tucker organized a Tuttle exhibition that was trounced by critics, leading to her dismissal. On January 1, 1977, at the age of 37, Tucker founded The New Museum. Tucker wanted the New Museum to exhibit living artists, to have knowledgeable guards, and to throw out its permanent collection of art every ten years to remain young. At the New Museum, Tucker organized major exhibitions including Bad Painting (1978), The Time of Our Lives (1999), A Labor of Love (1996), and Bad Girls (1994), and was co-curator of a retrospective exhibition by the Catalan artist Perejaume at the Museum of Contemporary Art in Barcelona in 1999. She was the series editor ofDocumentary Sources in Contemporary Art, five books of theory and criticism published by the New Museum. In 1983, she was chosen as the U.S. Commissioner for the 1984 41st Venice Biennale. Tucker's exhibition was entitled Paradise Lost/Paradise Regained and was organized with Ned Rifkin and Lynn Gumpert. The exhibition included twenty-four American artists, including Eric Fischl, David True, and Richard Bosman.

In a 1998 lecture, Tucker said the museum, "like a handful of other contemporary art venues in the United States, is a 'laboratory' organization not only by virtue of the kind of work we show, but because we try to look critically at museum practice, especially our own, questioning our own premises and methods regularly." (University of Wisconsin–Milwaukee, April 16, 1998; "The Contemporary Art Museum as a Site of Innovation and Resistance"). In 1999, Tucker stepped down from directing the museum and Lisa Phillips was appointed as the new director. In 2004 she moved to Santa Barbara, California.

From 1999 to 2006, Tucker worked as a freelance art critic, writer, and lecturer. She taught at Cornell University, Colgate University, Rhode Island School of Design and the Center for Curatorial Studies at Bard College. While living in Santa Barbara, California, she was a critic in residence in the Fine Arts Department and Graduate Studies: Fine Arts at Otis College of Art and Design from 2005 to 2006. She wrote for The New York Times, The Christian Science Monitor, Art in America, Art Forum, and ARTnews, among others. Her memoir, A Short Life of Trouble, which describes a vital period in American art from the mid-1960s on, including friendships and encounters with such artists as Marcel Duchamp, James Rosenquist, Lee Krasner, Andy Warhol, Joan Mitchell, and Bruce Nauman, was released in 2008.

== Private life ==
Ms. Tucker acquired her surname in an early marriage. Survivors included her husband, Dean McNeil; and their daughter, Ruby. Marcia Tucker performed as a stand up comedian, under the pseudonym "Mabel McNeil" as "Miss Mannerist".

In 1979 she founded the a cappella vocal ensemble, The Art Mob, in order to, as she said, sing in a group that couldn't throw her out. The Art Mob performs "outdated and unfashionable songs that we find by pawing through musty hymnals, tattered choral books and boxes of disintegrating sheet music." Its repertoire includes Victorian parlor songs, shape-note hymns, Tin Pan Alley hits and misses, radio gospel, and jazz. The Art Mob celebrated its 40th anniversary in 2019.

== Catalogues and publications ==
- "No Title," in The Space of Art: Buddha and the Culture of Now, ed. Jacqueline Baas and Mary Jane Jacob, University of California Press, 2005.
- "No Title," in Buddha Mind in Contemporary Art, ed. Jacquelynn Baas and Mary Jane Jacob, University of California Press, Berkeley, Los Angeles & London, 2004.
- "A Labor of Love," in Objects and Meaning: Readings that Challenge the Norm, ed. Anna Fariello and Paula Owen, Scarecrow Press, Maryland, 2003.
- Talking Visions: Multicultural Feminism in a Transnational Age, Documentary Sources in Contemporary Art, Vol. V, published by the New Museum of Contemporary Art in conjunction with The M.I.T. Press, 1998, Series editor and foreword.
- "Museums Experiment with New Exhibition Strategies," The New York Times, Arts and Leisure section, Sunday, January 10, 1999.
- "Questing for New Definitions of Contemporary Art," The New York Times, Arts and Leisure section, Sunday, March 29, 1998.
- Schjeldahl, Peter & Marcia Tucker (1998). Liza Lou : essays. Santa Monica: Smart Art Press in association with the Santa Monica Museum of Art.
- "A [Re]Movable Feast," Grantsmakers in the Arts, Spring 1997, Volume 8, Number 1.
- "The New Museum: Documentary Sources in Contemporary Art," American Art Review, (Special Issue: The Henry Luce Foundation), February/March 1995.
- "Collecting: The Strategy of Desire," a catalogue essay for the exhibition, Mettlesome & Meddlesome: Selections from the Robert J. Shiffler Collection, The Contemporary Arts Center, Cincinnati, Ohio, 1994.
- "A Moment in Reverse," The Hamburger Monument against Fascism by Jochen and Esther Gerz, Verlag Gerd Hatje, Germany, 1994
- Condensed version of a presentation delivered at The Contemporary Museum, Hawaii, on July 25, 1993, ARTbeat, November 1993.
- Different Voices: A Social, Cultural, and Historical Framework for Change in the American Art Museum, Project Director. Introductory essay, "Who's on First? Issues of Cultural Equity in Today's Museums," by Marcia Tucker, Association of Art Museum Directors, New York, 1992.
- Out There: Marginalization and Contemporary Cultures, Documentary Sources in Contemporary Art, Vol. IV, published by the New Museum of Contemporary Art in conjunction with The M.I.T. Press, 1990, Series Editor and foreword.
- Discourses: Conversations in Postmodern Art and Culture, Documentary Sources in Contemporary Art, Vol. III, published by the New Museum of Contemporary Art in conjunction with The M.I.T. Press, 1990, Series Editor and foreword.
- "Common Ground," Museum News, July/August 1990.
- "Nancy Dwyer Makes Trubble," Artforum, November 1989.
- "Women Artists Today: Revolution or Regression?" Making Their Mark: Women Artists Move into the Mainstream, Maidenform, Inc., 1989.
- "Equestrian Mysteries: An Interview with Deborah Butterfield," Art in America, June 1988.
- "The Painted Equation: An Artist's [Alfred Jensen] Rendering of Nature's Laws," The Sciences, March/April 1988.
- Blasted Allegories: An Anthology of Writings by Contemporary Artists, Documentary Sources in Contemporary Art, Vol. II, published by the New Museum of Contemporary Art in conjunction with The M.I.T. Press, 1987, Series Editor and foreword.
- "Not Just for Laughs: The Art of Subversion," SF Camerawork Quarterly, March 1987.
- PAST, PRESENT, FUTURE: Photographs by Daniel Faust, Amanda Means, Andres Serrano, Susan Unterberg, and Carrie Mae Weems, 1986.
- Art After Modernism: Rethinking Representation, Documentary Sources in Contemporary Art, Vol. I, published by the New Museum of Contemporary Art in conjunction with David R. Godine, 1984, Series Editor and foreword.
- "An Iconography of Recent Figurative Painting: Sex, Death, Violence and the Apocalypse," Artforum, Summer 1982.
- "Terry Allen (on everything)," Artforum, October 1982.
- "The Ring: 'A Story which Swallows its Own Tale,'" Terry Allen, exhibition catalogue, The Nelson Gallery/Atkins Museum, Kansas City, Missouri, 1981.
- "An Interview with Jack Tworkov," Jack Tworkov, Paintings 1950-1978, Third Eye Centre, Glasgow, Scotland, 1979.
- "Mythical Vision: The Work of Alfred Jensen," Alfred Jensen: Paintings and Diagrams from the Years 1957-1977, Albright-Knox Art Gallery, Buffalo, N.Y., 1978.
- "Cultural Irony," (Charles Garabedian, H.C. Westerman, Jim Roche), Critical Perspectives in American Art, University of Massachusetts, Amherst, 1976.
- Introduction, Heavily Tattooed Men and Women, compiled by Spider Webb, McGraw Hill, Inc., N.Y., 1976.
- Preface, Art Talk: Conversations with Twelve Women Artists, by Cindy Nemser, Charles Scribner & Sons, N.Y., 1975.
- Guest Editor, Los Angeles Institute of Contemporary Arts Journal, (New York/California Issue), No. 10, March/April, 1976.
- "Bypassing the Gallery System," Ms. Magazine, February 1973.
- "Pat Steir: 'The Thing Itself, Made by Me,'" Art in America, January/February, 1973.
- Bruce Nauman: work from 1965 to 1972, (Bruce Nauman, Jane Livingston, Marcia Tucker) Los Angeles County Museum of Art and Praeger, N.Y., 1973.
- "The Anatomy of a Brush Stroke: Recent Paintings by Joan Snyder," Artforum, May 1971.
- Robert Morris, Praeger Books, Inc., N.Y., 1970.
- "PheNAUMANology," Artforum, December 1970. Reprinted in "Bruce Nauman," Hayward Gallery, London: 1998.
- American Painting in the Ferdinand Howald Collection, Catalogue Raisonné, The Columbus Gallery of Fine Arts, Columbus, Ohio, 1969.

== Death ==
Tucker died aged 66 on October 17, 2006, in Santa Barbara, California.

== Recognition ==
She received the Skowhegan Governors Award for Lifetime Service to the Arts (1988), was the 1999 recipient of the Bard College Award for Curatorial Achievement, and the Art Table Award for Distinguished Service to the Visual Arts in 2000. She was also awarded three Yaddo fellowships in 2003, '04, and '05.

== Bibliography ==
- Tucker, Marcia; Lou, Liza (2010) [2008]. A short life of trouble : forty years in the New York art world (215 pages, ill., 23 cm). Berkeley: University of California Press. ISBN 978-0-5202-6595-0. OCLC 449859986.
