= Thales Academy =

American private independent school in North Carolina

- North Carolina; United States

Information
- Type: Private, Independent
- Founded: 2007 (19 years ago)
- Founder: Robert L. Luddy
- Faculty: 250
- Grades: Pre-K through 12
- Gender: Co-educational
- Enrollment: 3,600+
- Athletics: NCISAA
- Tuition: Pre-K: $4,800/year; K–5: $5,300/year; 6–12: $7,600/year
- Website: www.thalesacademy.org

Thales Academy (/ˈθeɪliːz/ THAY-leez) is a network of private non-sectarian community schools located primarily in central North Carolina. The school was founded in 2007 by Robert L. Luddy and graduated its first senior class in 2016 with three seniors. As of 2021, there are over 3600+ students stretched across 12 campuses mainly based in North Carolina, but also a campus located in Virginia and Tennessee. The Pre-K–12 college preparatory school was named for the Greek philosopher Thales of Miletus, often credited as the father of Greek Philosophy.

== History ==
Thales Academy, a 501(c)(3) not-for-profit school, was established in 2007 by Robert L. Luddy, a North Carolina conservative political donor, entrepreneur, philanthropist, and founder of CaptiveAire Systems. Prior to Thales, Luddy founded Franklin Academy in Wake Forest, one of the state's largest charter schools, and St. Thomas More Academy in Raleigh, an independent Catholic college preparatory school. Luddy founded Thales in an effort to create a model school to offer a higher quality education than local schools at a more affordable cost.

In 2018, Thales Academy faced controversy for a rule in the student handbook that barred its students from discussing gender identity or sexuality, stating "promotion, affirmation, or discussion of behaviours associated with the terms ‘sexual orientation’ or ‘gender identity’, including homosexuality, bisexuality and transgenderism, are expressly prohibited." The wording in the handbook was later changed to read: "Discussions of a sexual nature, including discussions of sexual behaviours or acts, are types of expression that are disruptive to the learning environment and should not occur. Similarly, we understand that our families approach issues such as sexual orientation, identity, and expression through a variety of social, religious, and philosophical perspectives and believe discussions around these subjects most appropriately occur, if at all, at home rather than in the classroom or school environment."

The school drew national attention during 2020 when it reopened for in-person instruction early in the COVID-19 pandemic. Due to this attention, Vice President Mike Pence and Education Secretary Betsy DeVos visited the Thales Apex campus to tout the benefits of children returning to school in-person. In 2021, the school became mask-optional. After some parents expressed concerns about the new lax policy, Luddy stated "the flu is worse for children than COVID."

Since its founding, Thales Academy has opened fourteen locations and expanded from North Carolina into Virginia and Tennessee.

== Locations ==
The front side of Thales Academy in Rolesville

Current locations for Thales Academy are Cary, Clayton, Rolesville, Holly Springs, Knightdale, Raleigh, Apex, Wake Forest, and Waxhaw, North Carolina, with additional locations in Midlothian, Virginia and Franklin, Tennessee. The newly constructed, two-story brick buildings consist of approximately 20 classrooms on 34,000 square feet (grades K–5 campuses) or 55,000 square feet (grades 6–12 campuses). The buildings feature Greek columns, polished concrete floors, large windows, and painted classical murals in hallways in an effort to instill “the importance of order and beauty.” K–5 campuses offer playgrounds with artificial turf. Most junior high and high school campuses offer full-sized gymnasiums and auditoriums as well as outdoor soccer fields, however, Thales Academy Apex no longer has their field, instead opting for a second 9-12 building.

== Academics ==
Thales Academy uses a classical education method "that embodies traditional American values." In grades K–5, the school uses a methodology known as Direct Instruction (DI). DI uses repetition and frequent assessment to verify student achievement before moving to the next lesson. Lessons are fast-paced with choral responses to maintain student engagement. In grades 6–12, DI is phased out as students begin to use the Socratic Method through education in the trivium. Classes are grouped by student ability, allowing for larger class sizes. As a college-preparatory school, Thales Academy offers a STEM-focused elective track called the “Luddy Institute of Technology,” known to students simply as “LIT”, which teaches pre-engineering classes for high school students, allowing students to learn about 3D computer-assisted design (CAD), like Solidworks.

Thales Academy places an emphasis on "the Western canon" in educating its students and although Thales is not technically a religious school, its website states that "Thales Academy's curriculum, instruction, and educational philosophy have been shaped by the Judeo-Christian worldview."

=== Tuition ===
Annual tuition rates for Thales Academy vary by year, grade level and location.

According to the 2027-2028 tuition information, Thales Academy Pre-K tuition is $6,300; K-5 tuition is $7,200-$7,500; 6-8 tuition is $7,500-$8,000; and 9-12 is $8000.

== Athletics ==
Thales Academy participates in the North Carolina Independent Schools Athletic Association (NCISAA) across multiple campuses including Apex, Rolesville, Flowers-Plantation and Holly springs. Athletic programs include basketball, soccer, volleyball, baseball, softball, golf, and cross country. Athletics are incorporated into the school's broader educational philosophy emphasizing leadership, discipline, teamwork, and sportsmanship.

=== Basketball ===
The Thales Academy Rolesville Knights boys basketball program recorded one of the strongest recent seasons among Thales campuses during the 2025–26 season, finishing 13–11 overall and second in conference play.

Notable players appearing on Thales Academy basketball rosters over multiple varsity seasons include:

- Hunter Steffen
- Tristan Patterson
- Isaac Purvis
- Alex McKown
- Preston Hereghty
- Rishi Kota

=== Soccer ===
The Thales Academy Apex Titans soccer program has maintained varsity competition since the late 2010s and has fielded both varsity and freshman programs.

Recurring multi-year varsity contributors appearing in MaxPreps historical rosters include:

- Cole Barish
- Ethan Hereghty
- Blaine Mollot
- Luca Guastaferro
- Luke Jury
- Ethan Linares
- Alex McKown
- Kostya Mansyreff
- Wyndham Freeman

The program expanded significantly between 2017 and 2026 with increased roster sizes and multiple levels of competition.

=== College Athletics ===
Several Thales Academy student-athletes have created recruiting profiles or continued into collegiate athletics, particularly in soccer, swimming, basketball, football, and track and field. Publicly documented athletes associated with Thales Academy athletics or recruiting platforms include:

- Ian Giffel (swimming)
- Piper Snider (basketball)
- Delaney Gill (soccer)
- Cole Barish (soccer)

=== Records and Statistics ===
Historical statistics and roster archives for Thales Academy athletic programs are maintained primarily through maxpreps rolesville; https://www.maxpreps.com/nc/rolesville/thales-academy-rolesville-knights/ and apex at https://www.maxpreps.com/nc/apex/thales-academy-apex-titans/ and campus athletics websites. Due to the relatively recent establishment of many Thales Academy campuses, comprehensive all-time statistical leaders are not fully documented publicly.

As of 2026, no Thales Academy alumnus has been publicly documented as competing in a major professional sports league.
