= Winston L. Shelton =

American inventor, electrical engineer, and entrepreneur (1922–2019)

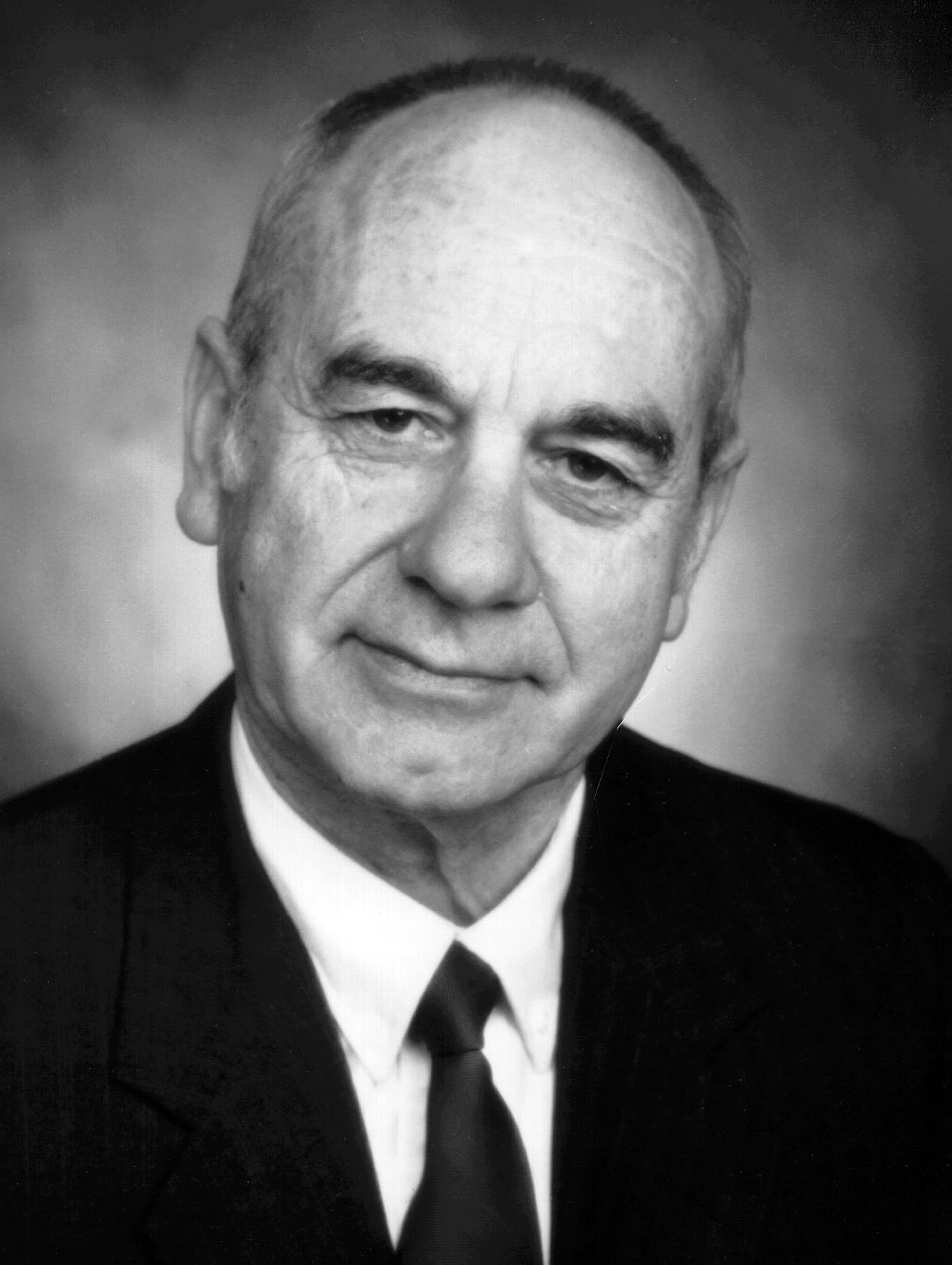
- Born: Winston Laverne Shelton; May 3, 1922; Lockwood, West Virginia, U.S.
- Died: April 15, 2019 (aged 96); Louisville, Kentucky, U.S.
- Occupations: Inventor; engineer; entrepreneur

Winston Laverne Shelton (May 3, 1922 – April 15, 2019) was an American inventor, electrical engineer and entrepreneur who was awarded 76 US patents as an individual or as part of a team, as well as many corresponding patents. Shelton's patents have had an impact relating to home washing machines and the preparation of food in both the Quick Service Restaurant (QSR) industry and fine dining. Technologies Shelton developed while an engineer at General Electric are still in use after more than fifty years. His patent for the modern "Washing Machine" (US 3257830 A), licensed in 1965 to General Electric has been referenced in over 40 subsequent patents.

Shelton also invented new ways to cook and hold food, including the Collectramatic, the first pressurized fryer that did not require interrupting production to frequently filter shortening while cooking. Shelton also invented Controlled Vapor Technology, a patented cooking method that uses water vapor to prepare and safely hold food.

== Early life ==
Born in Lockwood, West Virginia, in 1922, Shelton was the youngest of Naaman Shelton Sr. (1889–1962) and Opal Dell (née Keenan) (1895–1979) Shelton's five children. Opal Shelton operated the "Cross Roads Restaurant", a roadside diner next to the family's Standard Oil service station in Clay, West Virginia, where young Shelton had his first exposure to food service, helping his mother in the diner's kitchen. Shelton enlisted in the US Army in 1943, serving in the Army Specialized Training Program at Princeton University in the School of Engineering and was discharged in 1945. Shelton's education included attending Greenbrier Military School, Princeton University and West Virginia University, earning a Bachelor of Science degree in Electrical Engineering in 1948.

== Inventions at GE ==
Shelton's career at General Electric began in 1948 as an engineer in the GE Home Laundry facility in Trenton, New Jersey. In 1952, Shelton transferred to the new General Electric Appliance Park in Louisville, Kentucky as a Research and Development Engineer when the Trenton Home Laundry division was consolidated there along with GE's other major appliance product lines. His tenure there spanned two decades. While there, his inventions earned 35 patents, primarily related to the drum washing machine, all assigned to GE. His inventions helped create and refine the modern, top-loading, rotating spiral agitator clothes washer. Shelton invented the mechanism to automatically provide the correct water level(s) at a desired water temperature during a washing machine's cycles and an easily removed and cleaned soil trap that strained insoluble dirt and debris as the unit's water was filtered through it during the wash and rinse cycles. GE marketed Shelton's invention as the "Filter-Flo Basket". The unit fit on top of the washing machine's agitator post and rotated during use.

Shelton's inventions also included an anti-siphonage inlet system (US 2638112) to avoid back contamination of a water supply, and a drain overflow arrangement for built-in washing machines that provided a safe means of dealing with excess water during operation.

Addressing the need for better controls for the automatic washing machine, in 1955 Shelton took a Telechron clock motor and built a geared, cam timing control mechanism around it. Patented as the “Timing Mechanism for Conducting a Selected One of a Plurality of Sequences of Operation”, the control is still in use on many appliances (US 2870278 A).

== Winston Industries ==
In 1965, Shelton formed Engineering Prototype Services (EPS) with his brother, Naaman Shelton Jr. (1919–1990) in Louisville, Kentucky, where he could work on projects outside of the GE product line. Colonel Sanders was one of the first investors in the new company. Shelton resigned from GE in 1968. The company name was changed to Winston Industries in 1984.

The majority of Shelton's inventions after founding Winston Industries focused on solving problems in the food industry. His patents relating to food preparation include an automatic oven that cooks food and then automatically drops the cooked food onto a pivoting platform for sale (US 5990452 A), a food storage device that provides a method of controlling humidity in the cooking chamber (US 5595109 A) and a thermalizing apparatus using both wet bulb and dry bulb temperature sensors to more precisely control cooking parameters inside a cooking chamber (US 6521871 B1).

== The Collectramatic and KFC success ==
An early customer, filtering-equipment manufacturer Carl Mies, asked Shelton to engineer a pressure fryer for cooking chicken to replace the dangerous process then used by Kentucky Fried Chicken. Workers at Kentucky Fried Chicken franchises fried chicken in stove top pressure cookers using 400-degree shortening, leading to burns and exploding pressure cookers. Shelton said "I watched that madness and thought, 'That's an engineer's dream, man!' There were so many problems to solve, and that was just the low-hanging fruit".

After inventing a fryer with Mies, Shelton then invented the Collectramatic in 1969, a stationary, self-filtering fryer, employing precision time and temperature controls to meet Kentucky Fried Chicken founder Colonel Harland Sanders' legendary exacting standards. Shelton's self-filtering fryer allowed KFC restaurants to continuously fry multiple batches of chicken without interruption. Colonel Sanders "enthusiastically supported" the Collectramatic.

Shelton's Collectramatic helped fuel KFC's rapid expansion and success. Same store KFC sales grew nearly 400% in the short term. According to Fred Jeffries, the chain's vice president of purchasing at the time: "Stores were doing about $200,000 a year in sales on average with the pots . . . but they could never have done the $900,000 a year it became without Win's fryer. He helped set the stage for that with true engineering thinking".

== Controlled Vapor Technology ==
Colonel Sanders asked Shelton to invent a better way to hold just fried KFC chicken so the crust would not get soggy as the food was held for sale. Shelton invented a process in which cooked food was held in a controlled water vapor atmosphere heated to the food's desired finished temperature. Shelton named his invention "Controlled Vapor Technology". Shelton's food holding device using his Controlled Vapor Technology was named the "Controlled Vapor Oven" or "CVap Oven", a device that could indefinitely hold food safely at both a desired temperature and texture. Shelton was awarded a US Patent in 1996 for his invention of Controlled Vapor Technology and the Controlled Vapor Oven.

Shelton explained the Controlled Vapor Technology process as using water vapor, rather than air, as the medium for heating food, since air dries foods. Subsequent research proved food could be prepared to exacting precision using Shelton's Controlled Vapor Technology, allowing chefs much greater control over interior and exterior moisture, temperature and time during the preparation of many foods.

Starting in 2008, the CVap oven was tested by University of Kentucky College of Agriculture, Food and Environment Food Systems Innovation Center, validating the safe processing of proteins in CVap ovens during a five-year testing program. According to Nathan Myhrvold, founder of The Cooking Lab, "... the CVap provides better temperature stability than any ordinary oven or holding cabinet does". Another benefit of the CVap process is that it results in less product loss during cooking, which translates into higher profit. Farmhaus restaurant chef-owner Kevin Willmann explained the benefit in cooking porchetta in a CVap oven. Conventional oven cooking resulted in a loss of 25 to 40 percent of the meat's initial weight. "You go to CVap and that can't happen because the environment is so humid that moisture can't leave". Willman claimed a loss of less than 10 percent when cooking the same recipe in a CVap oven.

CVap ovens are used by fine-dining chefs, hotels, school cafeterias and fast-food operators in kitchens around the world.

== Rockwell portrait of Colonel Sanders ==
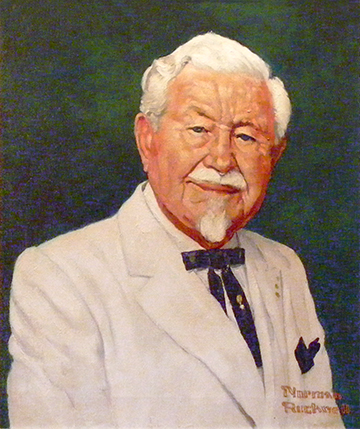

In 1973, at the urging of his wife Dolly, Shelton sought to have Norman Rockwell paint a portrait of Colonel Sanders as a way to commemorate "the Colonel". Working through George Bemis, Shelton's Advertising and Promotion Manager, a series of letters were sent to Rockwell, starting in March, 1973. Rockwell initially refused, saying "…my schedule is completely filled for a year and a half, so it would just be impossible for me to do a portrait of Colonel Sanders".

Shelton continued to press Rockwell to accept the commission. When Rockwell said "we must bear in mind that I am 79", Bemis responded "Colonel Harland Sanders is eighty-three years young and going strong. Perhaps he would consider you, at seventy-nine, a mere child". Rockwell responded with another demurral but this time did include his fee for a portrait, saying "I think I should add that I get $ 8,000 for a head and shoulders portrait, in oil…"

Rockwell finally agreed to schedule a portrait session with Sanders in August 1973, where reference photographs were taken in studio and Rockwell made "color notes" in oil of Sanders. In November, Rockwell wrote "I would like to have him (Sanders) see the portrait, as far as I have done it, to see whether it is to his liking". Rockwell finished the portrait and presented it to Sanders on March 16, 1974.

Winston Industries' Norman Rockwell portrait of Col. Sanders is on loan and currently on display in Sanders' office museum at the KFC corporate headquarters in Louisville, Kentucky. The public may view the painting at no charge. Normal viewing hours are Monday through Friday from 8:00 am until 5:00 pm.

== Biography published ==
A biography of Shelton written by author Steve Coomes entitled "Winston L. Shelton: a life of Invention" was published February 4, 2018. The book features Shelton discussing his life in his own words as well as contributions from family and co-workers.

Coomes' synopsis of the book mentions "Four decades before Winston Shelton began creating revolutionary foodservice equipment, he was tinkering with junkyard castoffs to make a working underwater exploration helmet, a gasoline powered child's wagon, and a rudimentary sawmill—all before he was in high school. With the help of his mechanically intuitive father and brother, he discovered how things worked by disassembling and reassembling them. In the process, Shelton became a practical problem solver whose own intuition refined and created some of the most influential machines ever built. In this inspiring book, the entrepreneurial creator of Winston Industries tells a story of working on the Manhattan Project, becoming a groundbreaking G.E. engineer and revolutionizing how Kentucky Fried Chicken cooked its prized product".

== Later activities ==
=== Teaching ===
Shelton continued to teach chefs and dietitians throughout the world the science behind controlling food temperatures and food texture using his Controlled Vapor Technology. William H. Bender, founder of Foodservice Consultants Society International said "He (Shelton) has translated complex food and science issues into equipment solutions ... CVap revolutionizes food best practices dramatically. (Shelton) has correctly aligned the science and purpose of food temperature control and controlling food moisture".

=== Continued research ===
Having stepped down as CEO of Winston Industries, Shelton continued to head the Advanced Engineering department at the company until his death.

His daughter, Valerie Shelton was named President and CEO of Winston Industries in 2010. She resigned the position in March, 2020.

=== Media appearances ===
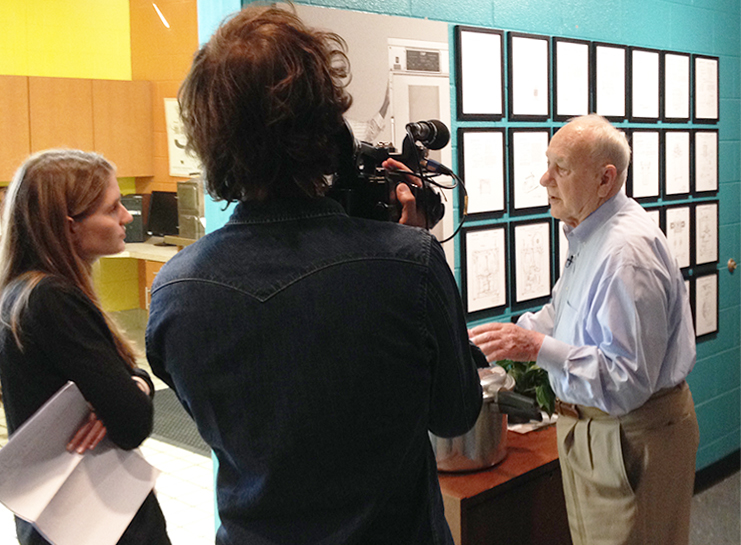
Winston L. Shelton during 2016 interview by French television reporters from Groupe Canal+, C8 Network's investigative news magazine "Focus".

Shelton was interviewed in June 2016 by a team of French journalists about his friendship and business relationship with Colonel Sanders and his invention of the Collectramatic fryer for KFC. Shelton and Chef Barry Yates also demonstrated how the Collectramatic functions. The 90 minute documentary, "Inside KFC : Au coeur d'un géant du fast food (Inside KFC: In the heart of a fast food giant)" was first broadcast on September 14, 2016, as part of the French television news magazine "Focus", hosted by Guy Lagache, on the Groupe Canal+ C8 Network.

Shelton was interviewed in May 2018 by Louisville television station WHAS-TV (ABC affiliate) reporter Sara Wagner as part of "Characters of Kentuckiana". The segment, entitled "Inventing Never Stops - The Inventor" showcased Shelton's passion for invention and how Colonel Sanders helped drive his inventions of the Collectramatic fryer and the CVap Oven. Shelton explained how his father's answer to Shelton's question of what his father hoped to be remembered for (to have made the world a better place through his efforts in life) had motivated Shelton to continually invent better ways for the world to cook and enjoy more nutritious food. The interview was first broadcast on June 4, 2018, as part of "Good Morning Kentuckiana".

NBC Today Show host Willie Geist profiled Shelton's life in a “A Life Well Lived” segment on April 21, 2019. In the profile, Geist quoted Shelton's philosophy of life: “Innovating for the sake of others is how we pay our rent for our time on Earth. It’s how we give back to something that’s given us so much”.

== Publications ==
- Safe Protein Management and the Impending Foodservice Revolution. 2004.
- Food Thermalization and Moisturization Culinology through Controlled Vapor Technology. 2000.
- The Fundamentals of Controlled Vapor Technology. Butler Books. 1998.

== Awards ==
- 2010 Foodservice Equipment and Supplies (FE&S) Best in Class Consultants - Heavy Equipment - CVap Cook & Hold Ovens
- 2009 International Association of Culinary Professionals (IACP) Lifetime Achievement Award "...for his (Shelton's) remarkable equipment and technology contributions to the culinary industry".
- 2009 International Association of Culinary Professionals (IACP) Award of Excellence
- 2008 StarChefs International Chefs Congress Innovator Awards
- 2008 YUM! Brands Golden Bucket Award
- 2008 YUM! Brands YRI Equipment Supplier of the Year
- 2007 YUM! Brands Asia Business Relationship Award
- 2006 Foodservice Consultants Society International (FCSI) Education Provider of the Year
- 2001 Honorary Doctorate of Science degree from West Virginia University, Morgantown, WV
- 2001 Energy Foodservice Council's Manufacturer of the Year
- 1999 Electric Foodservice Council Manufacturer of the Year
- 1999 R&D Process Development & Equipment Technology Group's Vendor of the Year
- 1998 Johnson & Wales University Honorary Degree (to foodservice and hospitality industry professionals)
- 1998 Research Chefs Association (RCA) Pioneer Award Recipient
- 1996 Honorary Doctorate of Business Administration degree from Sullivan University, Louisville, KY
