= Nancy Chunn =

American artist

- Born: 1941 (age 84–85); Los Angeles, California
- Education: California Institute of the Arts
- Website: nancychunn.com

Nancy Chunn is an American artist (born 1941) based in New York, New York. Known for her commitment to geopolitical issues, Chunn’s work includes a diverse range of paintings.

== Biography ==
Nancy Chunn was born in Los Angeles, California and received her Bachelor of Fine Arts in 1969, from the California Institute of the Arts, Santa Clarita, California. She began her career in Southern California before moving to New York in the late 1970s, where she currently lives and works.

Chunn has exhibited internationally and has been represented by Ronald Feldman Fine Arts in New York since 1985.

Chunn currently teaches at the School of Visual Arts in New York, and taught a master painting class at Otis College of Art and Design in Los Angeles in 2007.

== Chunn’s work ==
Chunn’s paintings commonly expose the political arena and portray the power of the media to define and control public opinion. Her work is mostly painting focused on narrative, cultural references and social problems, history, and symbolism both in the global community. She often uses the news, and famously newspapers to draw inspiration and information, adding her own commentary to these sources. The work she produces is colorful, cartoonish, and laced with humorously dark commentary.

A self-proclaimed “political junkie,” she achieved critical success with her early map like paintings of tyrannized nations and has continued her commitment to documenting world events and the repeating cycle of history in the paintings she has produced since the early 1980s.

She is largely recognized for the yearlong Front Pages project, where she applied images and text to provide commentary on every cover page of The New York Times from January 1 to December 31, 1996. In 1997, Rizzoli produced a hardcover book illustrating each of the project’s works.

Chunn’s most recent painting series, Chicken Little and the Culture of Fear, on which she has worked since 2004, focuses on the terrorism crisis in America and the panic it perpetuates. This theme was similarly depicted in her 9/11 piece from 2002-2004. Following her 1999-2001 News Stories series of large-scale paintings based on news-breaking stories, Chunn was credited with inventing “a form of history painting for our time.”

A September 2004 Art Price article maintains that “during her 25-year career, Nancy Chunn’s consistent subject matter and stylistic diversity conveys a full maturity in her artistic vision. Her works clearly display integration of unique painting techniques, and, through a delicate, modern aesthetic, reveal a complex social conscience, which one can only rarely experience today.”

== Awards ==
Chunn was a 2009 Guggenheim Fellow. She was named Honoree of the fall 2007 Jennifer Howard Coleman Distinguished Lectureship and Residency at Otis College of Art and Design. In 2005, Chunn received an Anonymous Was A Woman Award. She has also twice received a Fellowship Award in Painting from the National Endowment for the Arts, namely in 1985 and 1995.

== Public collections ==
- City of Chicago, Chicago, IL
- Ms. Foundation for Women, New York, NY
- Chicago Museum of Contemporary Art, Chicago, IL
- The New York Times, New York, NY
- The Progressive Corporation, Cleveland, OH
- The Prudential Insurance Company of America, Newark, NJ

== Commissions ==
- Public School 125, Queens, NY permanent installation painting, commissioned by the City of New York, 1995
- Chicago Library Uptown Branch, Chicago, IL, permanent installation painting, commissioned by the City of Chicago, 1993-1995.

== Solo exhibitions ==
2016

Ronald Feldman Fine Arts, New York, NY, Chicken Little and the Culture of Fear, September 10 – April 17.

2007

Ben Maltz Gallery, Los Angeles, CA, Nancy Chunn: Media Madness, November 3, 2007 – January 8, 2008.

2004

Ronald Feldman Fine Arts, New York, NY, Paintings 1982–2004, September 10 – October 16.

2001

University of Arkansas at Little Rock, Little Rock, AR, Art, Politics, and the Media: Front Pages 1996 by Nancy Chunn, November 1 – November 28.

Ronald Feldman Fine Arts, New York, NY, News Stories, October 13 – November 10.

2000

Olin Art Gallery, Kenyon College, Gambier, Ohio, In the News, January 20 – February 27.

1998

Addison/Ripley Fine Art, Washington, DC, New Work 1997, January 15 – February 28.

The Corcoran Museum of Art, Washington, DC, Front Pages, January 10 – March 1.

1997

Institute of Contemporary Art at Maine College of Art, Portland, ME, Nancy Chunn: Front Pages 1996, November 6 – December 14.

Ronald Feldman Fine Arts, New York, NY, Front Pages 1996, January 11 – February 15.

1992

Ronald Feldman Fine Arts, New York, NY, The China Series, Part I: 2200 B.C.-1368 A.D., October 31 – November 28.

1989

Ronald Feldman Fine Arts, New York, NY, Nancy Chunn, May 6 – June 3.

1987

Chicago Museum of Contemporary Art, Chicago, IL, Nancy Chunn, November 20, 2007 – January 10, 1988.

Feature Gallery, Chicago, IL, April 24-May 23.

Ronald Feldman Fine Arts, New York, NY, Nancy Chunn: Paintings, January 10 – February 7.

1986

Hewlett Gallery, Carnegie Mellon College of Fine Arts, Pittsburgh, PA, February.

1984

Concord Gallery, New York, NY, April.

1981

A&M Artworks, New York, NY, February.

== Publications ==
1. Nancy Chunn - Exhibition Catalog for a solo show at the Museum of Contemporary Art in Chicago in 1987
  - Chunn, Nancy. Nancy Chunn. Chicago, IL: Museum of Contemporary Art, 1987. Print.
2. Front Pages- Exhibition held at the Corcoran Gallery of Art, Washington, D.C., in 1988. Includes entirety of the Front Pages Project and an Interview with the Artist, conducted by Gary Indiana.
  - Chunn, Nancy, and Gary Indiana. Front Pages. New York: Rizzoli, 1997. Print.
3. Nancy Chunn: Media Madness - Exhibition Catalogue for a solo show at Ben Maltz Gallery at Otis College of Art and Design in 2008.
  - Chunn, Nancy, Parme P. Giuntini, Meg Linton, and Marco Nocella. Nancy Chunn: Media Madness. Los Angeles, CA: Ben Maltz Gallery, Otis College of Art andDesign, 2008. Print.
4. The Apocalyptic Vision: Four New Images - Exhibition Catalogue for a group show at Galleri Bellman in 1983.
  - Hunter, Sam. The Apocalyptic Vision: Four New Images : Paintings by Nancy Chunn, Peter Dean, Micheal Dvortcsak, Robert Morgan. New York: Galleri Bellman, 1983. Print.
5. Exposures: Women & Their Art - Biography of many female artists, including Nancy Chunn.
  - Brown, Betty A, and Arlene Raven. Exposures: Women & Their Art. Pasadena, Calif: NewSage Press, 1989. Print.
