= U-tube =

Utube or u-tube may refer to:

- Oscillating U-tube, a technique to determine the density of fluids
- Universal Tube & Rollform Equipment, a company
- U-tube, a design for tubing in a nuclear power steam generator

== See also ==
- U-bend, in plumbing
- YouTube, a social media and online video sharing platform
