= Luddy =

Luddy is a surname. Notable people with the surname include:

- Barbara Luddy (1908-1979), American actress
- Edward I. Luddy, a stage name of Edward Ludwig (1899-1982), Russian-born American film director and writer
- Fred Luddy (born 1954/1955), American billionaire, founder of ServiceNow
- Hadley Luddy, American politician
- Robert Luddy, founder of CaptiveAire Systems, an American manufacturer of commercial kitchen ventilation systems
- Tom Luddy (born 1943), American film producer and co-founder of the Telluride Film Festival

== See also ==
- Luddy School of Informatics, Computing, and Engineering
- Luddy Crooks, stage name of Sydney Crooks
