= Diana Walker =

American photographer (born 1942)

- Born: January 20, 1942 (age 84); Washington, D.C., U.S.
- Education: Briarcliff College
- Occupation: Photographer
- Spouse: Mallory Walker
- Children: 2

Diana Walker (born January 20, 1942) is an American photographer known for her work as a Time magazine White House photographer from 1984 to 2004.

== Life and career ==
Diana Walker was born in Washington, D.C. She was graduated from Foxcroft School and attended Briarcliff College, where she majored in drama. After college, Walker spent 10 years in her mother's dress shop before deciding to pursue photography, a long-time hobby, as a career.

External videos
- Oral history interview with Walker conducted by the University of Texas at Austin's Briscoe Center for American History, March 8, 2013, C-SPAN

Walker worked as a freelance photographer for many years, shooting weddings and bar mitzvahs, before getting a job at Washington Monthly. She has since contributed to People, Washingtonian, Fortune, The New York Times Magazine, and The Village Voice.

Walker became a contract photographer for Time magazine in 1979, and was later promoted to one of the magazine's White House photographer positions in 1984, after covering Walter Mondale's presidential campaign. During her tenure at Time, Walker covered the Reagan, Bush and Clinton administrations, and followed the campaigns of Jimmy Carter, Walter Mondale, Ronald Reagan, George H. W. Bush, Bill Clinton, Al Gore, John Kerry and Hillary Rodham Clinton. While at Time, Walker spent a significant amount of time documenting Hillary Clinton's journey from first lady to senator, Democratic presidential candidate and Secretary of State. These photos have been compiled into a book, Hillary: The Photographs of Diana Walker.

External videos
- Presentation by Walker on Public and Private, October 30, 2022, C-SPAN
- Booknotes interview with Walker on Public and Private, December 22, 2002, C-SPAN
- Interview with Walker on The Bigger Picture, November 20, 2007, C-SPAN

== Awards ==
Walker has won several awards for her work from World Press Photo, the White House News Photographers Association and the National Press Photographers Association. In 2003, she received the National Portrait Gallery's Paul Peck Award for her interpretation and portrayal of the presidency. In 2012, she was awarded the Henry Luce Life Achievement Award from Time Inc.

== Books and exhibitions ==
Walker has authored three books. Public & Private: Twenty Years Photographing the Presidency (2002) chronicles Walker's own collection of photographs of the White House and Washington D.C. from her time at Time.

The Bigger Picture: 30 Years of Portraits (2007) was published by National Geographic and includes 200 candid photos of presidents and other world leaders. Her most recent book, Hillary: The Photographs of Diana Walker, published by Simon & Schuster in 2014, documents Hillary Clinton as she moved from first lady to senator to presidential candidate and later as Secretary of State.

Walker's work is featured in the Smithsonian National Portrait Gallery and the National Museum of American History. Her work has also been featured in exhibitions at the Art Institute of Chicago, the Minneapolis Museum of Art, the North Carolina State University libraries, the Addison/Ripley Fine Art Gallery and the Howard Greenberg Gallery.
