= Burkett Restaurant Equipment =

- Company type: Privately held company
- Industry: Foodservice Equipment
- Founded: 1977; 49 years ago
- Headquarters: Perrysburg, Ohio, United States
- Products: Food service equipment, commercial refrigerators, ice machines and ovens, food preparation machines
- Number of employees: 80 (2021)
- Website: www.burkett.com

Burkett Restaurant Equipment & Supplies is an American food-service equipment and supplies provider, headquartered in Perrysburg, Ohio.

== History ==
Founded by Jameel Burkett and Mike Burkett, the company has been family-owned and operated since 1977.

In 2006, the company won contracts with rapidly growing national chain Marco's Pizza, which it used as its preferred supplier of pizza ovens and dough mixers.

In 2010, the company appeared in the Inc. magazine "Inc. 5000" list of the fastest-growing companies in the US. For the year ending 2021, Burkett Restaurant Equipment was ranked #43 for food equipment dealers in Foodservice Equipment & Supplies magazine.
