= Ertegün =

Ertegün is a Turkish surname. Notable people with the surname include:

- Ertegün brothers, Turkish-American executives of Atlantic Records
  - Ahmet Ertegün
  - Nesuhi Ertegün
- Münir Ertegün, Turkish politician and diplomat and father of Ahmet and Nesuhi Ertegün
- Mica Ertegün, (1926–2023) Romanian-American interior designer and philanthropist, former wife of Ahmet Ertegün
