= Briarcliff College =

Former college in Briarcliff Manor, New York

- Dow Hall within Pace University, 2015
- Former names: Mrs. Dow's School for Girls; Briarcliff Junior College
- Type: Private women's college
- Active: 1904 (122 years ago)–1977 (49 years ago)
- Location: Briarcliff Manor, New York, U.S.
- Campus: Suburban, 37 acres (15 ha)
- 41.1384°N 73.8248°W

Briarcliff College was a women's college in Briarcliff Manor, New York, United States.

The school was founded as Mrs. Dow's School for Girls in 1903 at the Briarcliff Lodge. After Walter W. Law donated land and a building for the college, it operated at its location at 235 Elm Road in Briarcliff until 1977; closing due to low enrollment and financial problems.

Pace University subsequently operated it as part of its Pleasantville campus from 1977 to 2015. In an effort to consolidate its campuses, Pace sold the campus in 2017 to the Research Center on Natural Conservation, a host of conferences relating to global warming and conservation. The campus was again sold in 2021, to a Viznitz Yeshiva congregation.

== History ==
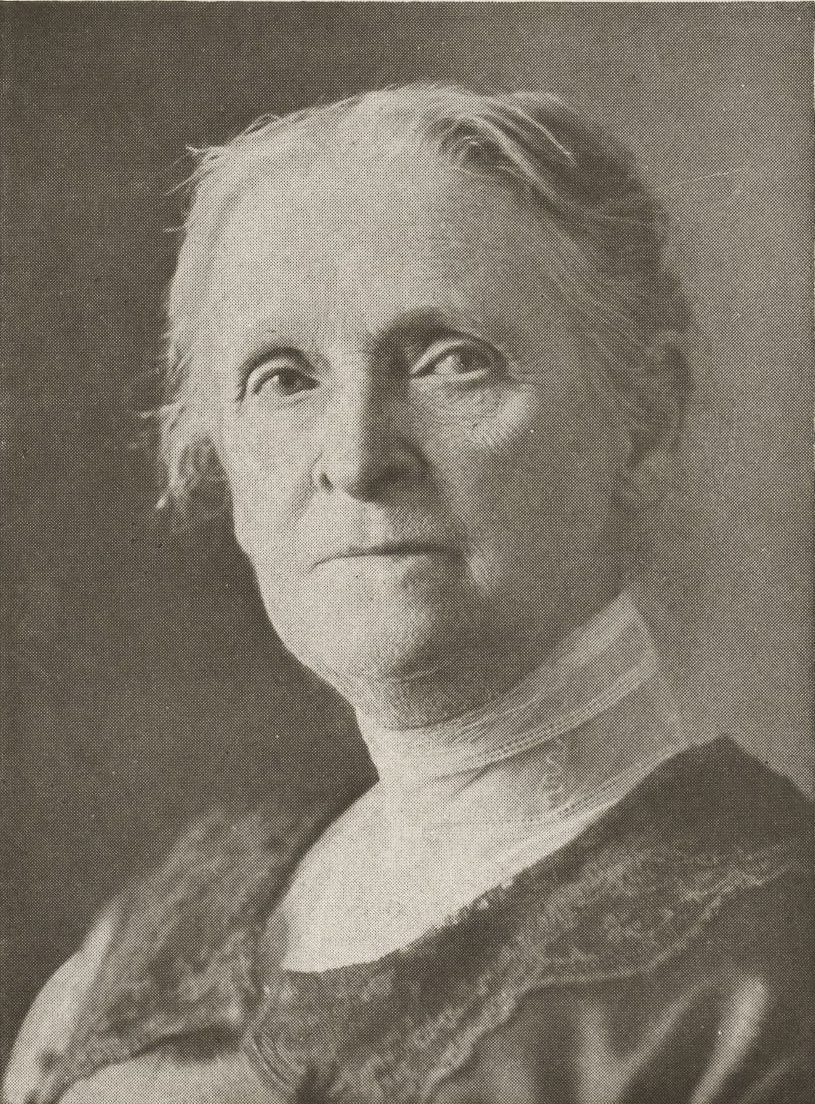
Mary Elizabeth Dow

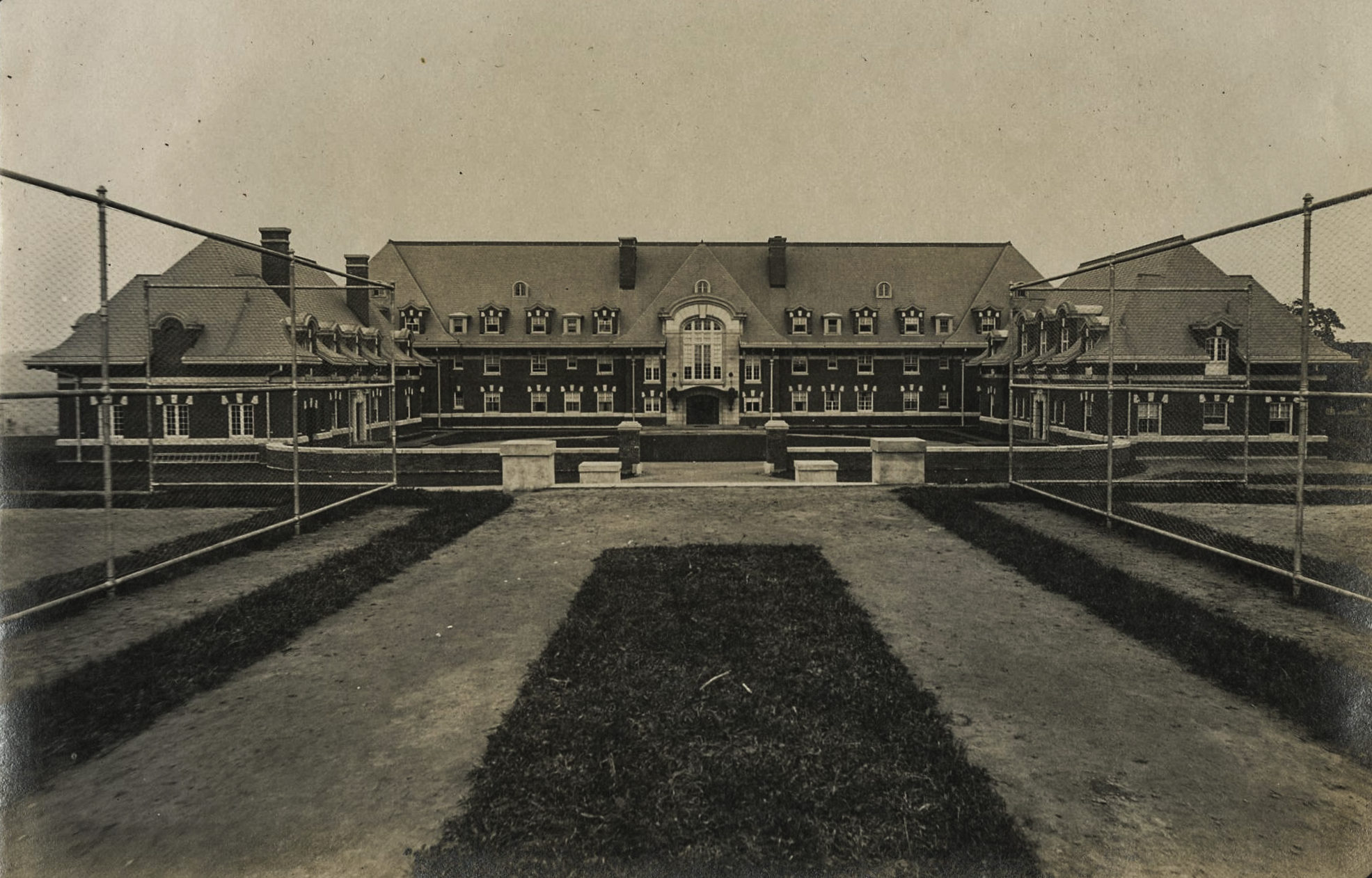
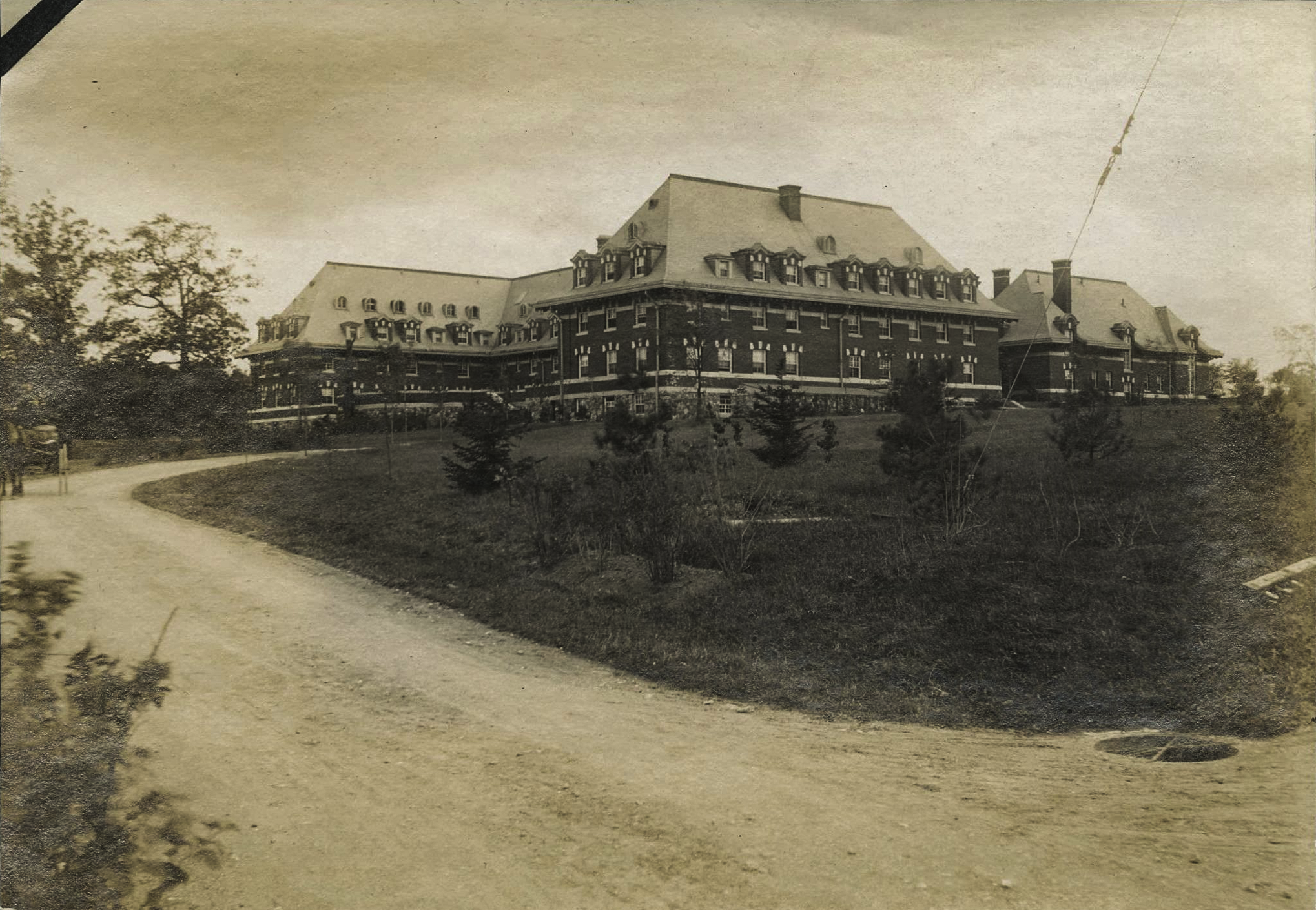
Dow Hall c. 1908

Educational reformer Mary Elizabeth Dunning Dow became the head of Miss Porter's School following the death of its founder Sarah Porter in 1900. However, conflict with school's trustees escalated and culminated in Dow's resignation in 1903. Dow then founded Mrs. Dow's School for Girls in 1903 at the Briarcliff Lodge; two years later, Walter W. Law gave Dow 35 acres (14 ha) and built the Châteauesque Dow Hall (Harold Van Buren Magonigle was its architect). Miss Porter's students and faculty members followed Dow to her new school.

Dow retired in 1919 and Edith Cooper Hartmann began running the school with a two-year postgraduate course; the school became a junior college in 1933. Briarcliff remained a junior college until 1957, shortly before the presidency of Charles E. Adkins and when it began awarding four-year bachelor's degrees. The school library, which had 5,500 volumes in 1942, expanded to about 20,000 in 1960. By the time of its closing, it had about 300 students.

The school prospered from 1942 to 1961 under President Clara Tead, who had a number of accomplished trustees, including Carl Carmer, Norman Cousins, Barrett Clark, Thomas K. Finletter, William Zorach, and Lyman Bryson. Tead's husband Ordway Tead served as chairman of the board of trustees. The school gradually improved its academic scope and standing, and was registered with the State Education Department and accredited by the Middle States Association of Colleges and Schools in 1944. In 1951, the Board of Regents authorized the college to grant Associate of Arts and Associate of Applied Science degrees. The following year, the Army Map Service selected the college as the only one in the country for professional training in cartography.

In 1944, Shelton House, a building across Elm Road, was purchased as a dormitory, and a classroom and office wing was dedicated in 1951. In 1955, after Howard Deering Johnson joined the board of trustees, the dormitory Howard Johnson Hall was built. From 1963, Briarcliff College rapidly expanded, constructing two dormitories, the fine arts and humanities building, the Woodward Science Building, and a 600-seat dining hall. In 1964, the college began offering the Bachelor of Arts and of Sciences degrees. The Center for Hudson Valley Archaeology was opened in 1964. Enrollment at the college jumped from around 300 to over 500 from 1960 to 1964; by 1967, enrollment was at 623, with 240 freshmen. During the Vietnam War, students protested U.S. involvement, and Adkins and trustees resigned; James E. Stewart became president. In 1969, twelve students, led by student president Edie Cullen, stole the college mimeograph machines and gave nine demands to the college. The next day, around fifty students participated in a 48-hour sit-in at Dow Hall. Josiah Bunting III became president in 1973 and Pace University and New York Medical College of Valhalla began leasing campus buildings. The college had 350 students in 1977, and students enjoyed half-empty dormitory buildings.

With the growing popularity of coeducation in the 1970s, Briarcliff found itself struggling to survive. President Josiah Bunting III leaving for Hampden-Sydney College in spring 1977 contributed to the problems the college was having. Rather than continue to struggle, the college's trustees voted to sell the campus to Pace University, a New York City-based institution. Instead of merging Briarcliff with Pace, the trustees attempted to reach a collaboration agreement with Bennett College, a junior women's college in nearby Millbrook which was also struggling with low enrollment. The plan did not work, however, and Briarcliff College was sold to Pace in April 1977 for $5.2 million ($27.6 million in 2025) after both Briarcliff and Bennett entered bankruptcy.

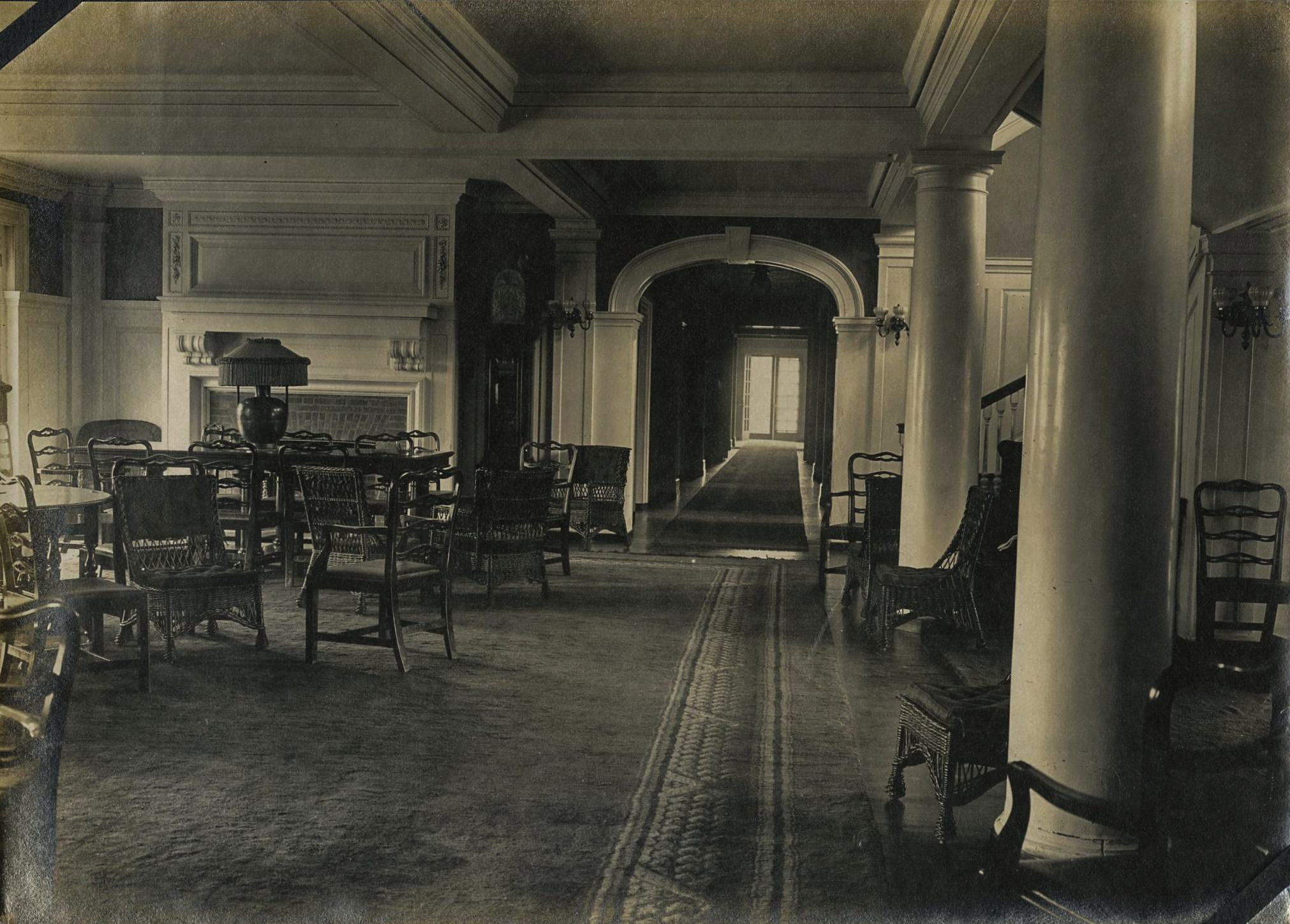
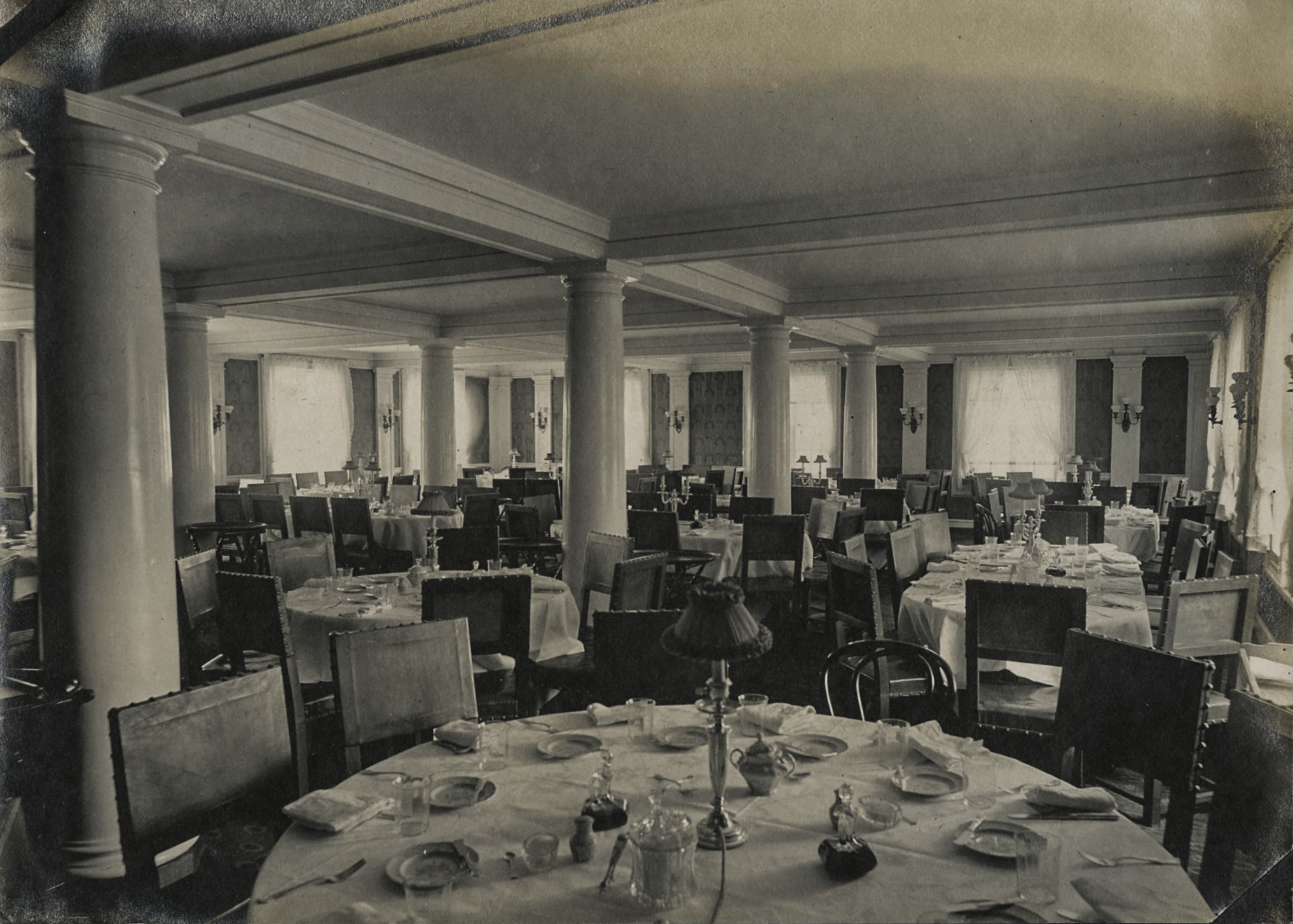
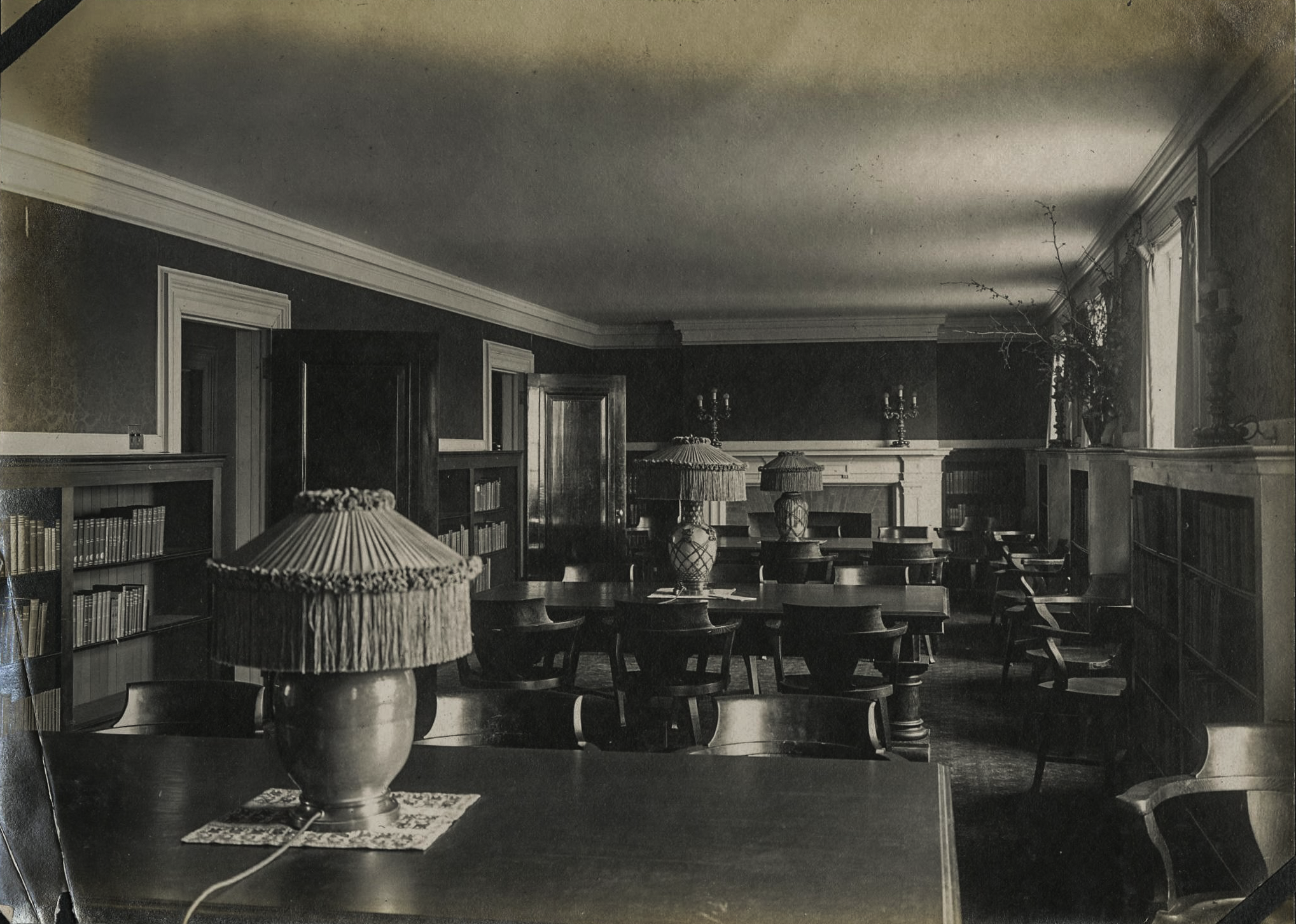
Entrance hall, dining room, and library c. 1908

Enrollment in Briarcliff College
Year	1942	1951–52	1960	1964	1967	1977
Enrollment	42	220	300	500	623	350

In 1988, the Hastings Center moved to Tead Hall, the school's library; the organization later moved to the town of Garrison.

The original Mrs. Dow's School building remains as the co-ed residence hall Dow Hall at Pace University. Residents of Briarcliff Manor were initially pleased to have another educational institution at the site, although Pace illegally turned its 188-spot parking lot into an 800-spot one, and allowed an extensive number of cars to be parked on the neighboring streets. The village government and school eventually reached a compromise.

Pace operated the site as part of its Pleasantville campus, centered on Choate House. The site currently has nine buildings with a combined 330,308 square feet (30,686.6 m^{2}), with sizes from 13,041 to 111,915 square feet. The buildings were used for offices, student housing, dining, recreation and education. The campus' 37 acres (0.1 km^{2}) also includes tennis courts and ball fields. The Pleasantville site is about 3 miles (4.8 km) away from the Briarcliff College site. In an effort to consolidate Pace University's Westchester County campuses into a single location, Pace University put the site up for sale in 2015. In October 2016, the Briarcliff Manor-Scarborough Historical Society hosted an event at Dow Hall to raise awareness of the building and its history, in order to encourage its preservation.

Toward the end of its ownership by Pace University, the site was used as a filming location. Its cafeteria, known as the Briarcliff Dining Center, was used for the 2012 film Inside Llewyn Davis and for the 2016 first-season finale of the show The OA.

In January 2017, Pace sold the property for $17.35 million to the Research Center on Natural Conservation, a nonprofit organization that hosts conferences relating to global warming and conservation. The China-based nonprofit also owns the nearby Arden estate and the New York Military Academy. In February 2021, a Viznitz Yeshiva congregation purchased the property for $11.75 million. The congregation, Dkhal Torath Chaim Inc., had problems with code violations when establishing a school in nearby Nyack, New York, though the Briarcliff College site has no code violations. The buildings there fell into disrepair, though were brought back up to code as a government condition of the sale.

== Classes ==
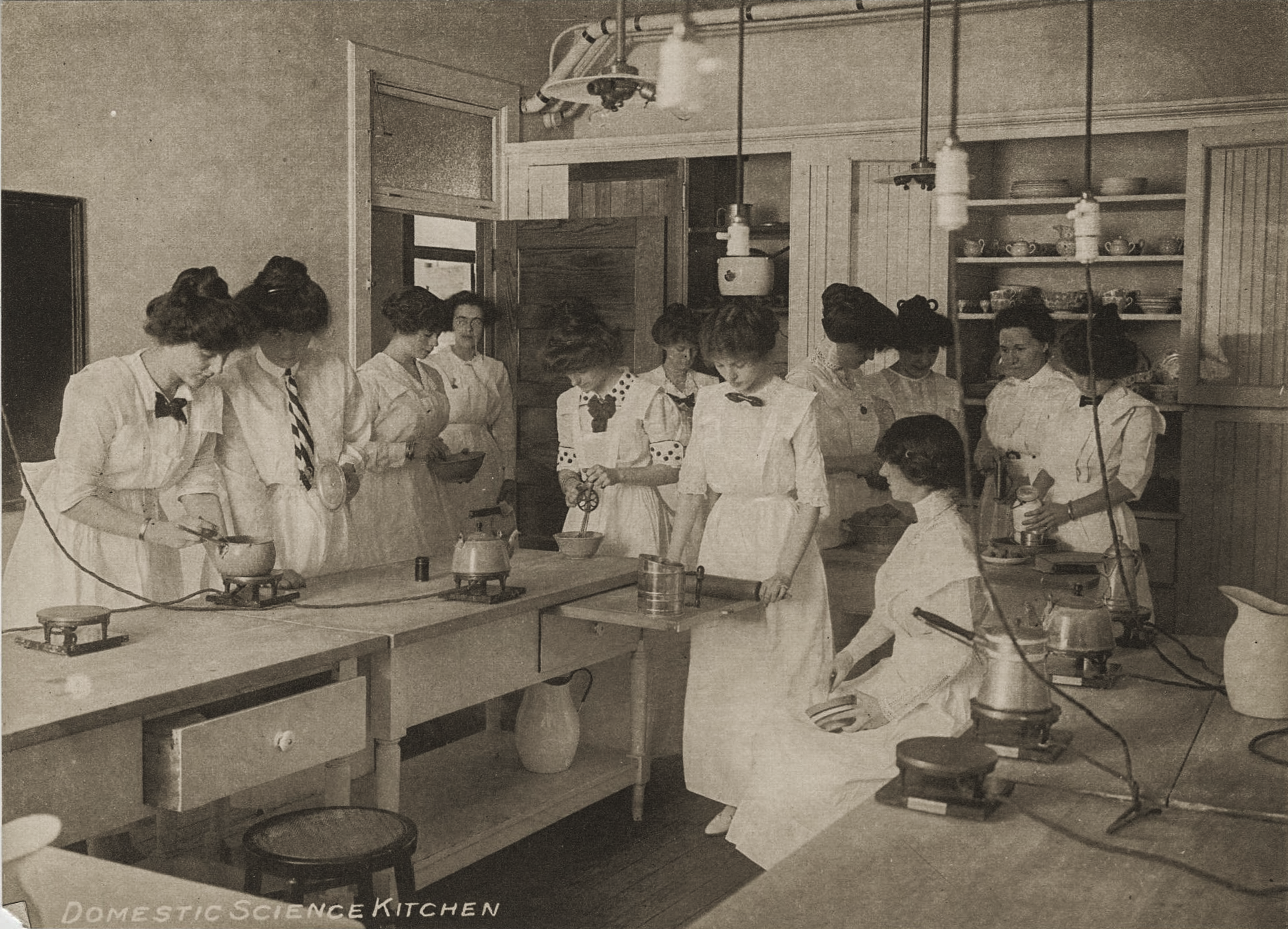
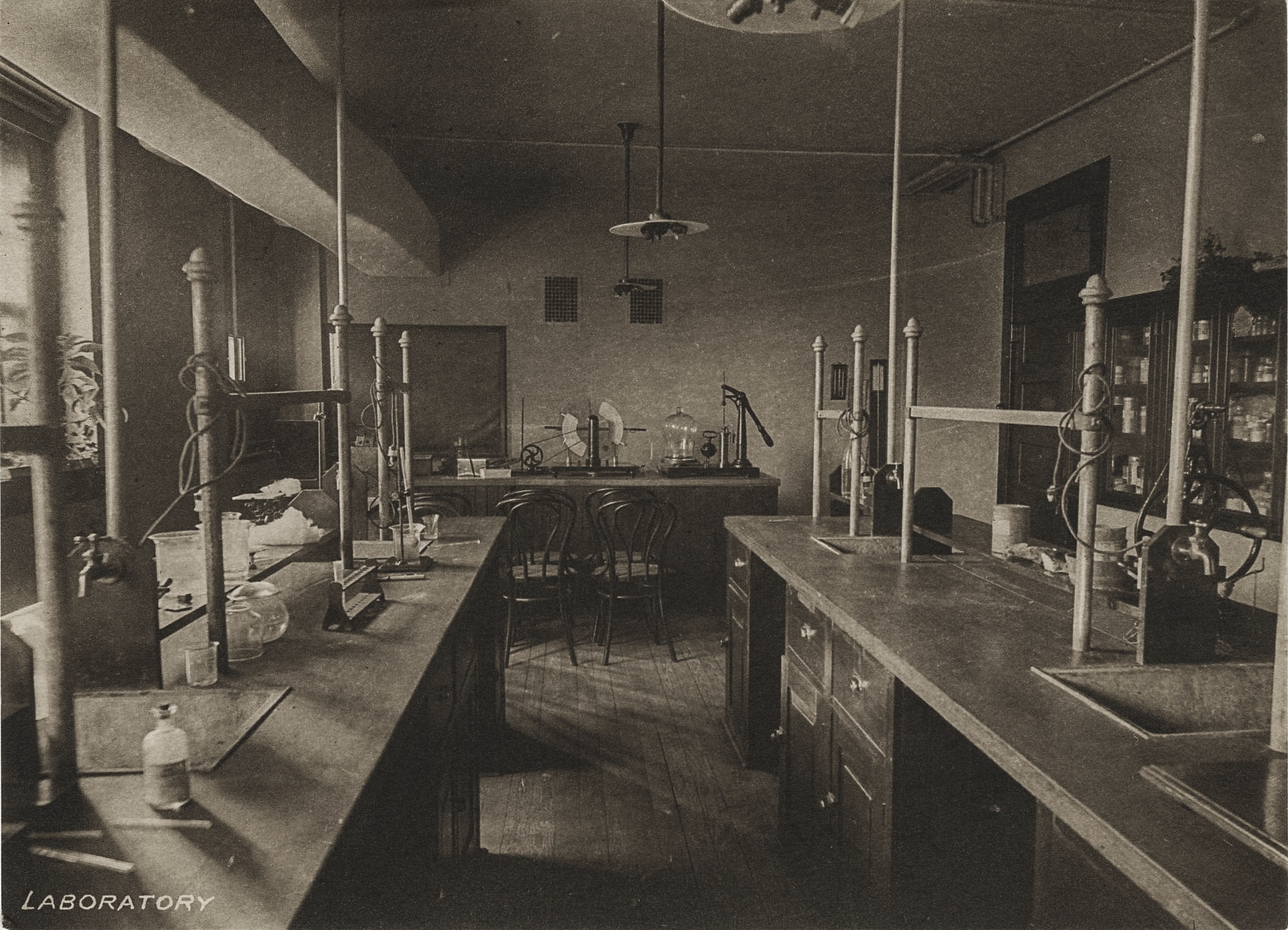
Kitchen and laboratory c. 1910

Around 1917 at Mrs. Dow's School, an art assistant taught classes in drawing, painting, and modeling. In addition to their daily tasks, the students prepared monthly compositions which would be critiqued by the school's art director Frank DuMond through a lecture. Art history classes included that of Italian Renaissance painting and sculpture, Western European painting, and the history of Greek sculpture, architecture, and interior decoration.

Mrs. Dow's also held lessons in ear training, elementary harmony, guitar, mandolin, piano, singing, and violin. The school also held occasional informal recitals, and allowed students to attend operas and concerts in New York City. Concerts and lectures were held at the school by notable artists, including Daniel Gregory Mason, Guiomar Novaes, Leonard Borwick, Percy Grainger, Efrem Zimbalist, Emilio de Gogorza, the Flonzaley Quartet, and the Kneisel Quartet.

Science classes at Mrs. Dow's around 1917 included Physiology, Botany, Chemistry, General Science, and Domestic Science. The latter class involved different curricula each term: dietaries, cookery, household administration and care, food chemistry, and (advanced) cookery. Mrs. Dow's held psychology, history of philosophy, political economy, social science, and ethics and logic classes.

Mathematics classes around that time included Algebra, Plane Geometry, Solid Geometry, Trigonometry, and Arithmetic and Accounts. Other classes included Dramatic Expression, Bible (required every Sunday), and Poetry (required every Monday).

== Activities and clubs ==
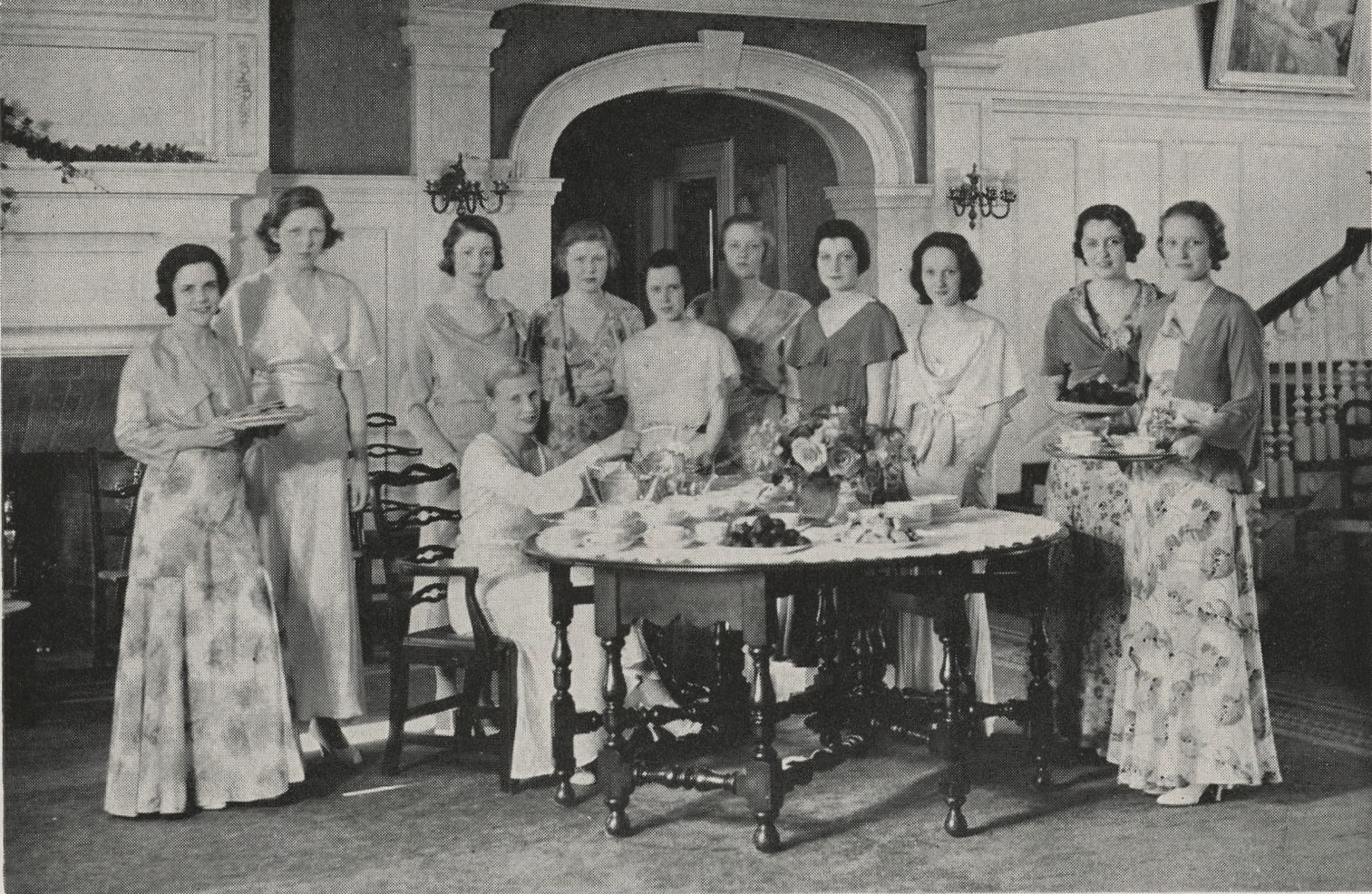
Lawn Tea members, 1932

=== Sports ===
In 1917, Mrs. Dow's required a physical examination for each student, including a doctor's certificate ensuring their heart and lung health. The school limited its student assignments to allow two hours of outdoor exercise daily. Sports included basketball, field hockey, soccer, and tennis.

=== Lawn Tea ===
Briarcliff College operated numerous clubs, including one honorary organization, called Lawn Tea. The organization planned social events for the college, and served as the official hostesses for visiting guests. It was the oldest club there. Members were chosen for their "social charm, capabilities, and poise".

== Notable people ==
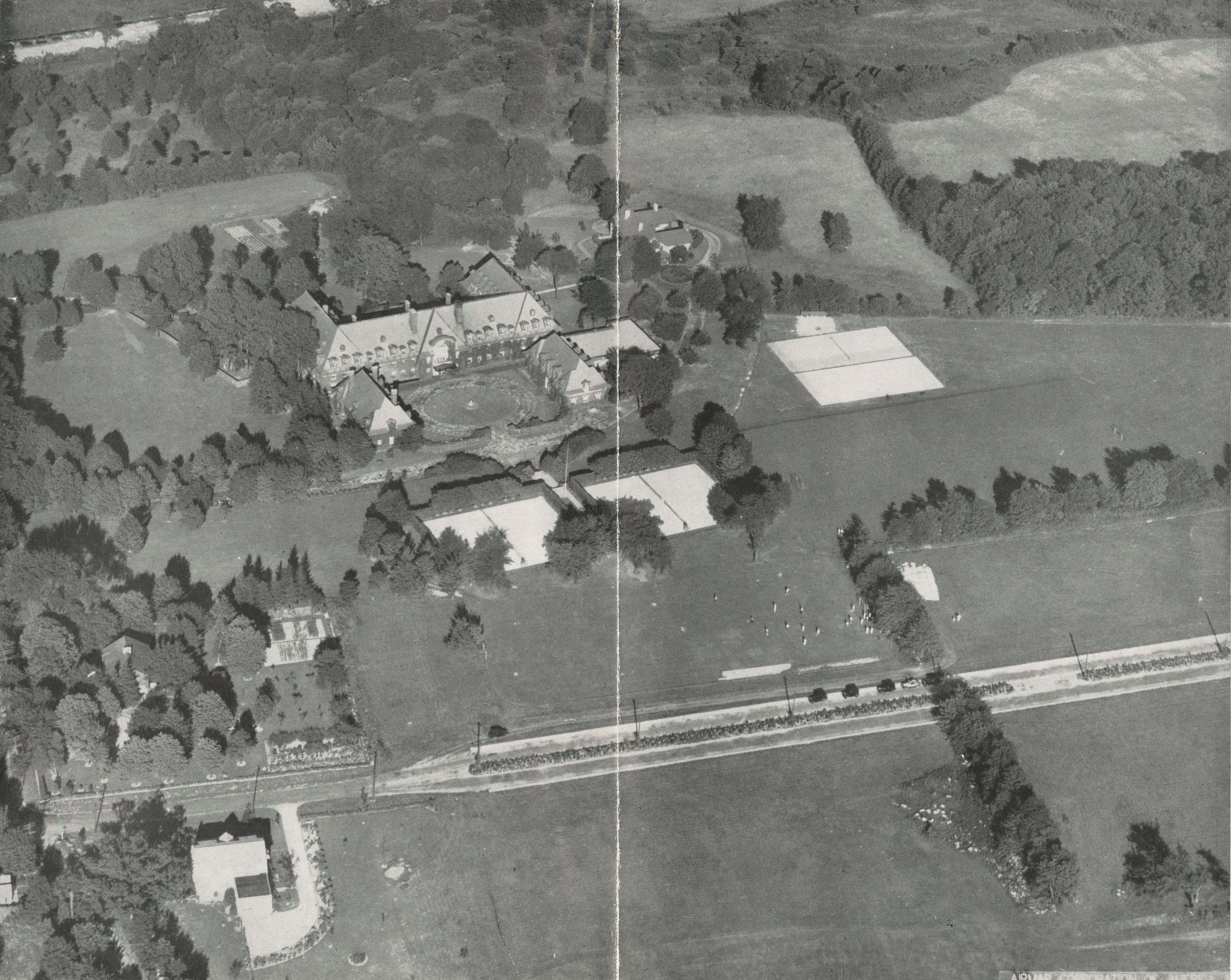
Briarcliff Junior College in 1942

=== Presidents ===
- Mary Elizabeth Dow (1903–1919)
- Edith Cooper Hartmann (1919-)
- Doris Flick (-1942)
- Clara Tead (1942–1960)
- Charles E. Adkins (1960–1968)
- James E. Stewart (interim)
- Thomas E. Baker (1970–1973)
- Josiah Bunting III (1973–1977)

=== Students ===
- Dorothy Burgess, stage and motion picture actress
- Susan Crocker, photographer
- Anne Windfohr Marion, rancher and horsebreeder from Fort Worth, Texas
- Mary Elsie Moore, heiress
- Chessy Rayner, socialite and interior designer
- Sushma Seth, Indian actress
- Attallah Shabazz, campaigner and speaker
- P. J. Soles, actress
- Diana Walker, White House photographer

=== Teachers ===
- Howard F. Bremer, historian and author
- Frank DuMond, art director
- Myrtle B. McGraw, psychologist
- David E. Mungello, history
- Kurt Seligmann, painter and engraver

== See also ==
- History of Briarcliff Manor
- List of defunct colleges and universities in New York
- List of women's colleges
