= Josiah Bunting III =

US Army officer (born 1939)

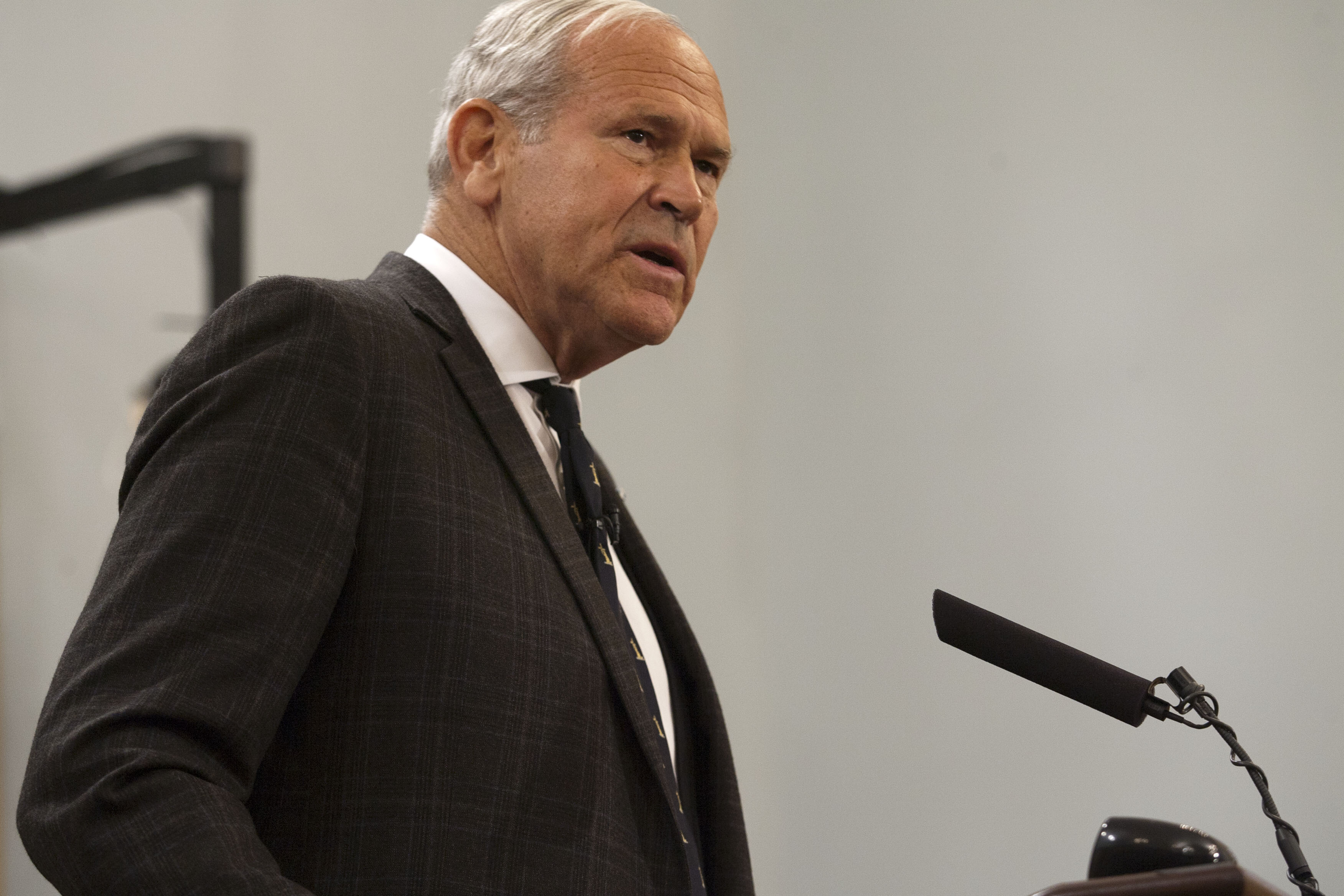
- Bunting speaks at the University of Virginia Miller Center of Public Affairs in 2011.
- Born: November 8, 1939 (age 86); Haverford, Pennsylvania
- Military career
- Allegiance: United States of America
- Branch: United States Army
- Service years: 1966 –1972
- Rank: Major
- Unit: 9th Infantry Division
- Other work: Author

Josiah Bunting III (born November 8, 1939) is an American educator. He has been a military officer, college president, and an author and speaker on education and Western culture. Bunting is married and has four adult children. His half-brother is Dick Ebersol. Ebersol and Bunting have the same mother.

== Background ==
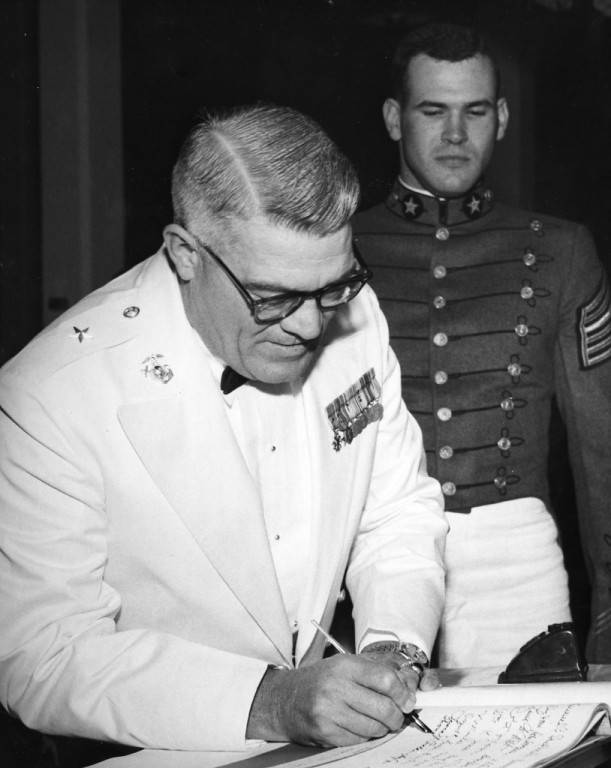
Bunting looks on, while Brigadier General Thomas F. Riley (Class of 1935) signing as Guest of Honor, Virginia Military Institute, 1963.

Josiah Bunting was born in Haverford, Pennsylvania. He attended The Hill School in Pottstown, Pennsylvania, and the Salisbury School in Connecticut, but was expelled from both institutions for playing pranks. He then entered the U.S. Marine Corps. Bunting went on to Virginia Military Institute where he graduated third in his class as an English major in the Class of 1963, and was elected to a Rhodes scholarship to attend the University of Oxford, where he received an M.A. and also served as president of the American Students Association. He entered the United States Army in 1966. After six years of service, he reached the rank of Major. He was stationed at Fort Bragg, North Carolina; Vietnam; and West Point, where he was assistant professor of history and social sciences.

Bunting's 1972 novel The Lionheads was a scathing account based on his experiences as an officer of the 9th Infantry Division in Vietnam in 1968. The novel's main antagonist, General Lemming, was based heavily on the commanding general, Julian Ewell.

The July 28, 1972 issue of LIFE magazine included a profile written by Thomas Moore of then Major Bunting examining his decision to leave West Point because of his desire to "disassociate [himself] from the active implementation of [the Army's] policy in Vietnam..." In the article Bunting also stated that he favored a "citizen draft and civilian control over the military" and that he didn't "want to see that son of a bitch who grows up in Greenwich, Conn., goes off to Yale and becomes a member of the Skull and Bones get out of doing some sort of national service." Bunting served on the faculty of the Naval War College for a year in 1973–74.

Bunting served as president of Briarcliff College from 1973 to 1977, and later as president of Hampden–Sydney College from 1977 to 1987. At Hampden–Sydney he revitalized the English composition or Rhetoric Program, enhanced the Western Civilization program, then called Western Man, making it more interdisciplinary. He also spearheaded the Campaign for Hampden-Sydney, a capital campaign that nearly tripled the college's endowment.

He was the headmaster of The Lawrenceville School near Princeton, New Jersey from 1987 to 1995.

Bunting was appointed Superintendent of the Virginia Military Institute in 1995 and served until 2003. At VMI, he served as Professor of Humanities. He was responsible for overseeing preparations for and the enrollment of VMI's first female cadets. He was openly opposed to allowing women to attend VMI, calling the 1997 decision in United States v. Virginia which struck down VMI's male-only admittance policy a "savage disappointment for the alumni." However, upon the announcement he briefed the Corps of Cadets on the verdict and stated that it must be accepted and VMI must do its best to ensure that this process be successful. He went on to initiate programs that would provide female leadership from other military schools for the first class of female 1st year students.

Bunting is also a member of the UNESCO Commission and of the National Council of the National Endowment for the Humanities in Washington.

In 2004, Bunting was appointed chairman of the National Civic Literacy Board of the Intercollegiate Studies Institute.

In 2007, Bunting was appointed president of ISI's Lehrman American Studies Center.

In 2015, Bunting was appointed chairman of the Friends of the National World War II Memorial.

== Books ==
=== Nonfiction ===
- Small Units in the Control of Civil Disorder (1967)
- Ulysses S. Grant (Times Books/Henry Holt, 2004), part of the American Presidents series (ed. Arthur M. Schlesinger Jr.)
- The Making of a Leader: The Formative Years of George C. Marshall (Knopf, 2024)

=== Novels ===
- The Lionheads selected one of the Ten Best Novels of 1973 by Time magazine.
- The Advent of Frederick Giles (1974).
- An Education for Our Time (Regnery, 1998), a work describing a "dying billionaire's detailed vision of a new, ideal college", was a main selection of the Conservative Book Club in 1998.
- All Loves Excelling (Bridge Works, 2001), set in a boarding school.

=== Edited editions ===
- Macaulay, Thomas Babington. Lays of Ancient Rome (Gateway, 1997)
- Newman, Cardinal John Henry. The Idea of a University (Gateway, 1999)

== Military service record ==
=== Rank ===
Major; United States Army

=== Awards and decorations ===

- Combat Infantryman Badge
- Parachutist Badge
- Bronze Star Medal with two oak leaf clusters
- Army Commendation Medal
- Presidential Unit Citation
- National Defense Service Medal
- Armed Forces Expeditionary Medal
- Vietnam Service Medal
- Vietnam Armed Forces Honor Medal, Second-Class
- Vietnam Campaign Medal
- Ranger Tab:

- Ninth Infantry Division ("Old Reliables") shoulder sleeve insignia (SSI):
