= Howard F. Bremer =

American historian

- Born: 1908
- Occupations: Author; Historian

Howard F. Bremer (1908 – August 26, 1980) was an American writer, historian, and professor of history. He has 13 works in 40 publications. He worked as a professor of history at Briarcliff College and is known for his work as an editor and author.

== Published works ==
- Bremer, Howard F. George Washington, 1732-1799: Chronology, Documents, Bibliographical Aids. Oceana, 1967.
- Bremer, Howard F. John Adams, 1735-1826: Chronology, Documents [and] Bibliographical aids. Oceana, 1967.
- Bremer, Howard F. Franklin Delano Roosevelt: 1882–1945. Oceana Publ., 1971.
- Bremer, Howard F. Richard M. Nixon, 1913–: Chronology, Documents, Bibliographical Aids. Oceana Publications, 1975.
- Bremer, Howard F. The Presidential Chronologies, a Collection. Oceana Publications, 1967.
- Bremer, Howard F. Oceana Presidential Chronology Series: Senior Ed.: Howard F. Bremer. Oceana Publ., 1967.
