= Perrysburg, Ohio =

- City
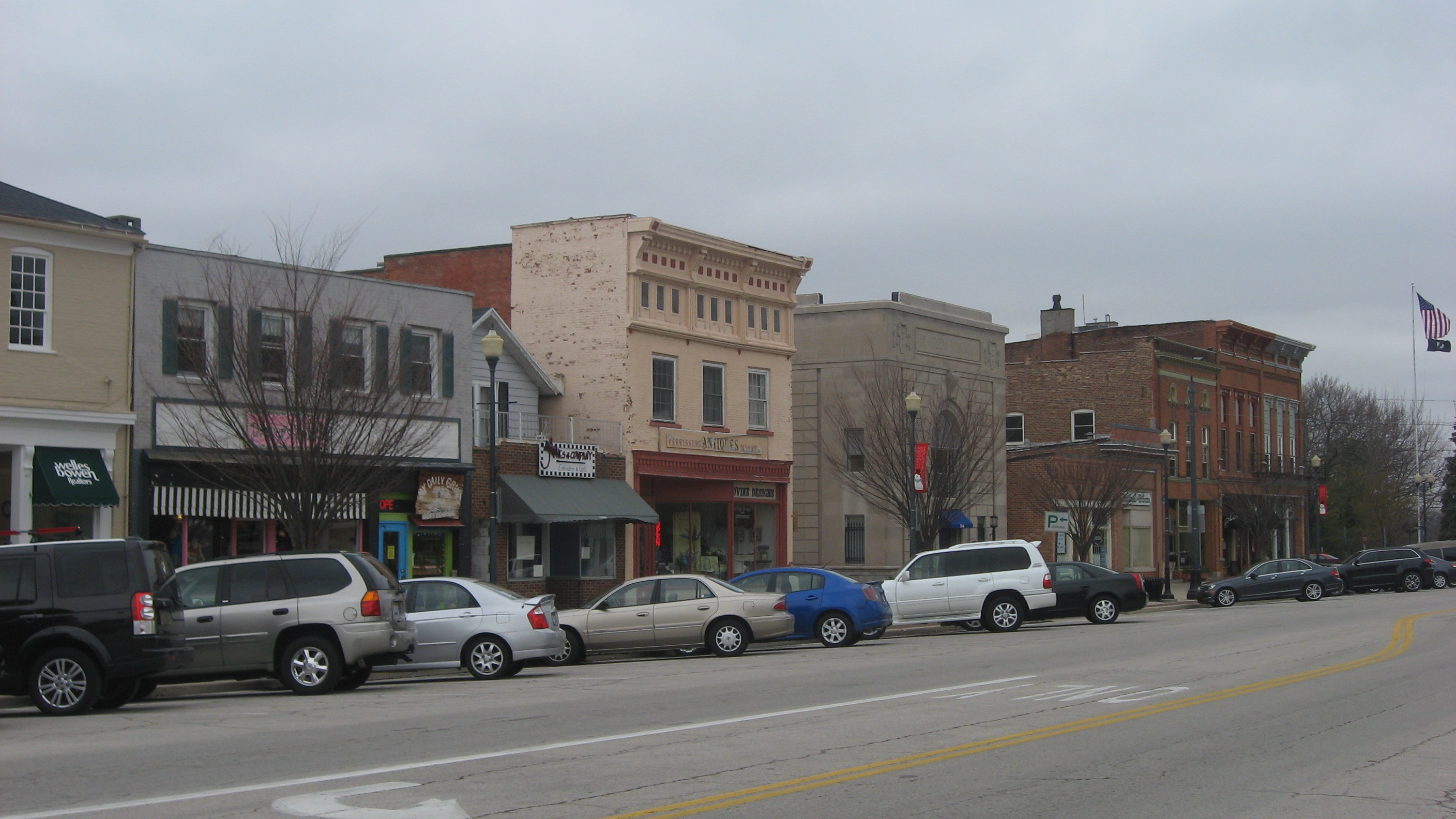
- Downtown Perrysburg

- Motto: "Embracing Our Past. Poised For The Future."
- Interactive map of Perrysburg, Ohio
- Location within Ohio Location within the United States
- Coordinates: 41°32′16″N 83°38′25″W
- Country: United States
- State: Ohio
- County: Wood

Area
  - Total: 11.93 sq mi (30.91 km^{2})
  - Land: 11.89 sq mi (30.80 km^{2})
  - Water: 0.042 sq mi (0.11 km^{2})
- Elevation: 637 ft (194 m)

Population (2020)
  - Total: 25,041
  - Density: 1,818.6/sq mi (702.15/km^{2})
- Time zone: UTC-5 (Eastern (EST))
  - Summer (DST): UTC-4 (EDT)
- ZIP codes: 43551–43552
- Area code: 419
- FIPS code: 39-62148
- GNIS feature ID: 1087193
- Website: www.perrysburgoh.gov/

Perrysburg is a city in Wood County, Ohio, United States. The population was 25,041 at the 2020 census. The city is along the south side of the Maumee River about 12 miles (19 km) southwest of Toledo and is part of the Toledo metropolitan area.

Perrysburg was surveyed and platted by a federal survey team in the summer of 1816. It served as the county seat from 1822 to 1868. A local legend has held that it was designed by noted architect Charles Pierre L'Enfant, after he planned Washington, DC, but this has not been supported by fact.

== History ==
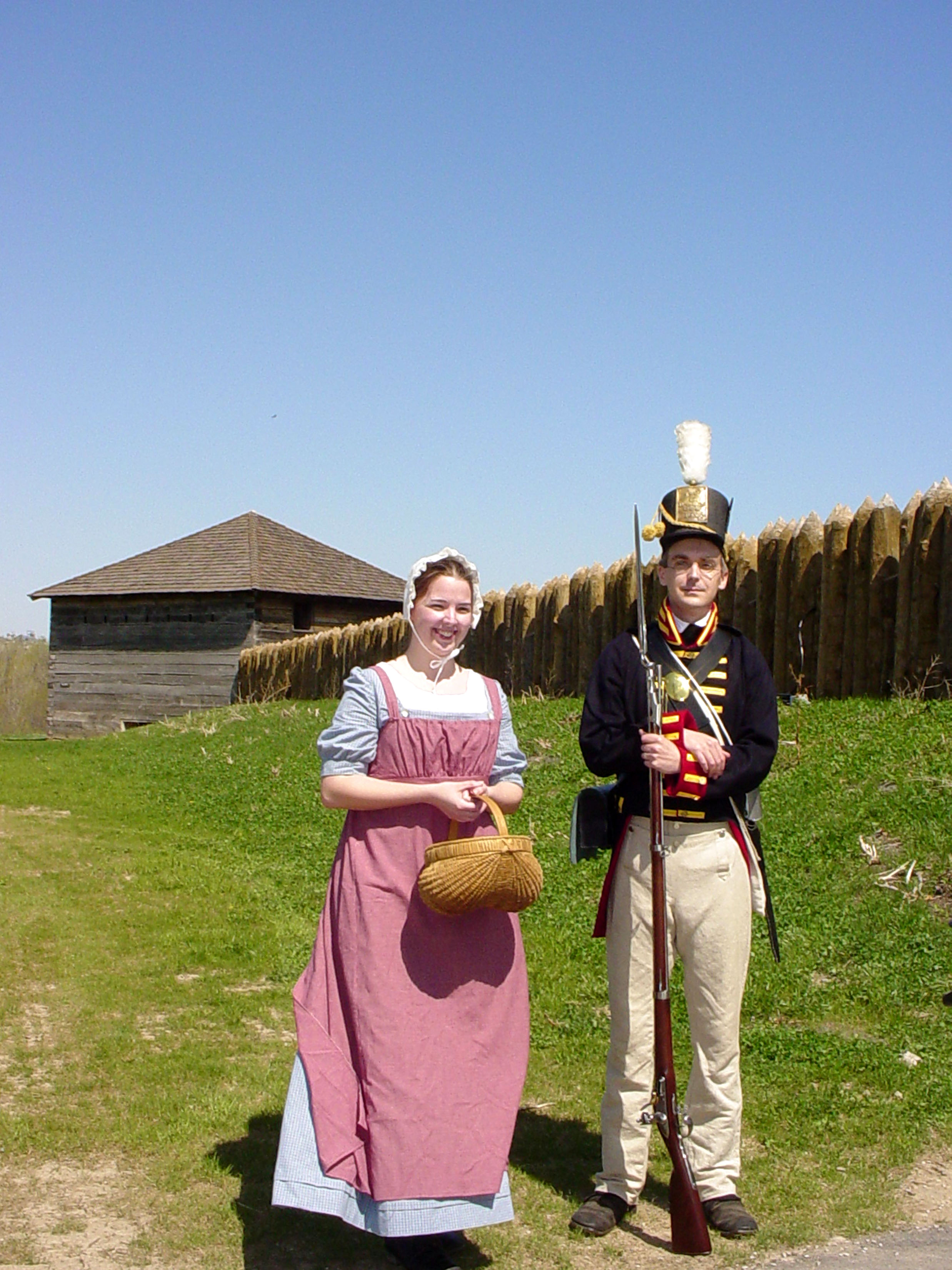
Perrysburg is home to Fort Meigs, the largest wooden walled fortification in North America.

=== Early history ===
Perrysburg lies near the center of the Twelve Mile Square Reservation, a tract of land ceded in 1795 to the United States by the Odawa people following their defeat in the Northwest Indian Wars. They had occupied this territory since the turn of the 18th century, after having settled in the region of the French trading post at Fort Detroit. Also known as the Ottawa, they had controlled much of the territory along the Maumee River in present-day northwestern Ohio.

In 1810, early European-American settlers here were Major Amos Spafford (1753–1818), his wife Olive (1756–1823), and their four children. In 1796, Spafford, a native of Connecticut, was a surveyor for the Connecticut Land Company. He drew the first map laying out Cleveland and named the city. He left there in 1810 following appointment as US Customs Collector and postmaster for the new port at the Foot of the Rapids of the Miami of the Lake Maumee River. Two years later, 67 families lived in the area, but most fled at the outbreak of the War of 1812.

=== War of 1812 ===
When the War of 1812 progressed toward Northwest Ohio, General William Henry Harrison ordered the construction of the fort, beginning in February 1813. Harrison was General Anthony Wayne's former aide-de-camp. Later he was elected as the country's ninth president. The installation was named Fort Meigs in honor of Ohio's fourth governor, Return Jonathan Meigs. Fort Meigs was constructed on a bluff above the Maumee River, and built from a design by army engineer Captain Eleazer D. Wood, for whom the county would be named. Two critical battles with the British were fought at the fort during the War of 1812.

Early settlers in the area fled to Huron during the War of 1812. They returned to settle in the floodplain below Fort Meigs, calling the settlement Orleans. They moved to higher ground after being flooded out.

Alexander Bourne led a surveying team to plan and plat Perrysburg. He was appointed to that position by Edward Tiffin, Surveyor General of the United States. This survey was performed in late June and early July 1816, by surveyors Joseph Wampler and William Brookfield under the auspices of Bourne and Josiah Meigs, Surveyor General of Ohio, Michigan, Indiana, Illinois, and Missouri.

Some postings on the Internet have claimed that Charles Pierre L'Enfant, noted designer of Washington, DC, had also surveyed and platted Perrysburg, Ohio. Prior to the city's 200th anniversary celebration, the Historical Society hired former engineers to assess this claim. The researchers studied local, state and federal archives, but found no support for this position.

=== 19th century growth ===
After the war and the 1817 Treaty of Fort Meigs, which extinguished the Ottawa claim to this area, Spafford returned to the area. He settled on a 160-acre land grant, signed by President James Monroe, on River Tract #64 in Waynesfield Township. Other veterans who received land grants for their service during that war also settled in this area.

The town soon became a center for shipbuilding and commerce on Lake Erie. It was named after Commodore Oliver Hazard Perry, naval commander during the War of 1812 and hero of the Battle of Lake Erie. From 1822 to 1868 Perrysburg served as the county seat. In 1833, Perrysburg contained a courthouse, jail, schoolhouse, two stores, two taverns, two physicians, two lawyers, about 60 houses, and 250 inhabitants.

Henry Bibb spent the winter of 1837–38 in Perrysburg following his first escape from slavery. He was adopted by the free Black community, which included many fugitive slaves. Bibb was able to obtain gainful employment and managed to save $15 over the course of the winter, which he put towards his plan to rescue his wife and children from slavery. Bibb's knowledge of Perrysburg helped him in a subsequent escape attempt, when he was able to allay suspicions by claiming to be a free resident of Perrysburg and accurately answering questions about the town's residents.

In 1854, an epidemic of cholera devastated the population. It had spread with residents and travelers along the waterways because of the lack of adequate sanitation. Perryville closed down for two months in that summer, trying to contain the epidemic at a time when people did not understand how the disease was transmitted. More than 100 people died. Other towns along the Maumee River also suffered high losses from the epidemic. Providence, Ohio was abandoned. It had suffered a disastrous fire less than a decade before.

The railroad arrived in 1859 with the completion of the Dayton and Michigan Railroad, later part of the Baltimore and Ohio Railroad. As of 2023 the line is part of the Toledo Subdivision of CSX, though it hosts no passenger service.

=== Modern history ===
On October 12, 1984, President Ronald Reagan made a whistle stop in Perrysburg while traveling in the historic Ferdinand Magellan railroad car. He drew a crowd of over 20,000.

== Geography ==
According to the United States Census Bureau, the city has a total area of 11.51 square miles (29.81 km^{2}), all land. Contrary to popular opinion and hundreds of historical articles, the 1816 survey of Perrysburg encompassed 1.786 square miles, NOT 1.000 square miles.

== Demographics ==
Historical population
Census	Pop.	Note	%±
1830	182		—
1840	1,041		472.0%
1850	1,199		15.2%
1860	1,494		24.6%
1870	1,835		22.8%
1880	1,909		4.0%
1890	1,747		−8.5%
1900	1,766		1.1%
1910	1,913		8.3%
1920	2,429		27.0%
1930	3,182		31.0%
1940	3,457		8.6%
1950	4,006		15.9%
1960	5,519		37.8%
1970	7,693		39.4%
1980	10,196		32.5%
1990	12,551		23.1%
2000	16,945		35.0%
2010	20,623		21.7%
2020	25,041		21.4%

=== 2020 census ===
As of the 2020 census, Perrysburg had a population of 25,041. The median age was 38.6 years. 25.0% of residents were under the age of 18 and 16.1% of residents were 65 years of age or older. For every 100 females there were 95.6 males, and for every 100 females age 18 and over there were 91.6 males age 18 and over.

99.6% of residents lived in urban areas, while 0.4% lived in rural areas.

There were 10,002 households in Perrysburg, of which 32.8% had children under the age of 18 living in them. Of all households, 53.6% were married-couple households, 16.2% were households with a male householder and no spouse or partner present, and 24.5% were households with a female householder and no spouse or partner present. About 29.4% of all households were made up of individuals and 12.1% had someone living alone who was 65 years of age or older.

There were 10,520 housing units, of which 4.9% were vacant. The homeowner vacancy rate was 1.3% and the rental vacancy rate was 6.3%.

Racial composition as of the 2020 census
Race	Number	Percent
White	21,550	86.1%
Black or African American	499	2.0%
American Indian and Alaska Native	51	0.2%
Asian	1,090	4.4%
Native Hawaiian and Other Pacific Islander	0	0.0%
Some other race	303	1.2%
Two or more races	1,548	6.2%
Hispanic or Latino (of any race)	1,272	5.1%

=== 2010 census ===
As of the census of 2010, there were 20,623 people, 8,246 households, and 5,504 families living in the city. The population density was 1,791.7 inhabitants per square mile (691.8/km^{2}). There were 8,845 housing units at an average density of 768.5 per square mile (296.7/km^{2}). The racial makeup of the city was 92.9% White, 1.4% African American, 0.1% Native American, 3.1% Asian, 0.8% from other races, and 1.6% from two or more races. Hispanic or Latino of any race were 3.2% of the population.

There were 8,246 households, of which 34.7% had children under the age of 18 living with them, 56.5% were married couples living together, 7.3% had a female householder with no husband present, 2.9% had a male householder with no wife present, and 33.3% were non-families. 28.3% of all households were made up of individuals, and 11% had someone living alone who was 65 years of age or older. The average household size was 2.48 and the average family size was 3.10.

The median age in the city was 38.4 years. 26.5% of residents were under the age of 18; 6.5% were between the ages of 18 and 24; 27.1% were from 25 to 44; 27.6% were from 45 to 64; and 12.3% were 65 years of age or older. The gender makeup of the city was 48.4% male and 51.6% female.

=== 2000 census ===
As of the census of 2000, there were 16,945 people, 6,592 households, and 4,561 families living in the city. The population density was 1,899.2 inhabitants per square mile (733.3/km^{2}). There were 6,964 housing units at an average density of 780.5 per square mile (301.4/km^{2}). The racial makeup of the city was 95.34% White, 1.03% African American, 0.10% Native American, 1.77% Asian, 0.02% Pacific Islander, 0.90% from other races, and 0.84% from two or more races. Hispanic or Latino of any race were 2.05% of the population.

There were 6,390 households, out of which 38.0% had children under the age of 18 living with them, 61.1% were married couples living together, 6.3% had a female householder with no husband present, and 30.8% were non-families. 27.8% of all households were made up of individuals, and 14.2% had someone living alone who was 65 years of age or older. The average household size was 2.55 and the average family size was 3.18.

In the city the population was spread out, with 29.0% under the age of 18, 5.6% from 18 to 24, 28.3% from 25 to 44, 24.0% from 45 to 64, and 13.0% who were 65 years of age or older. The median age was 38 years. For every 100 females, there were 92.7 males. For every 100 females age 18 and over, there were 86.5 males.

The median income for a household in the city was $62,237 and the median income for a family was $75,651. Males had a median income of $56,496 versus $31,401 for females. The per capita income for the city was $29,652. About 1.5% of families and 2.8% of the population were below the poverty line, including 1.7% of those under age 18 and 8.1% of those age 65 or over.

== Economy ==
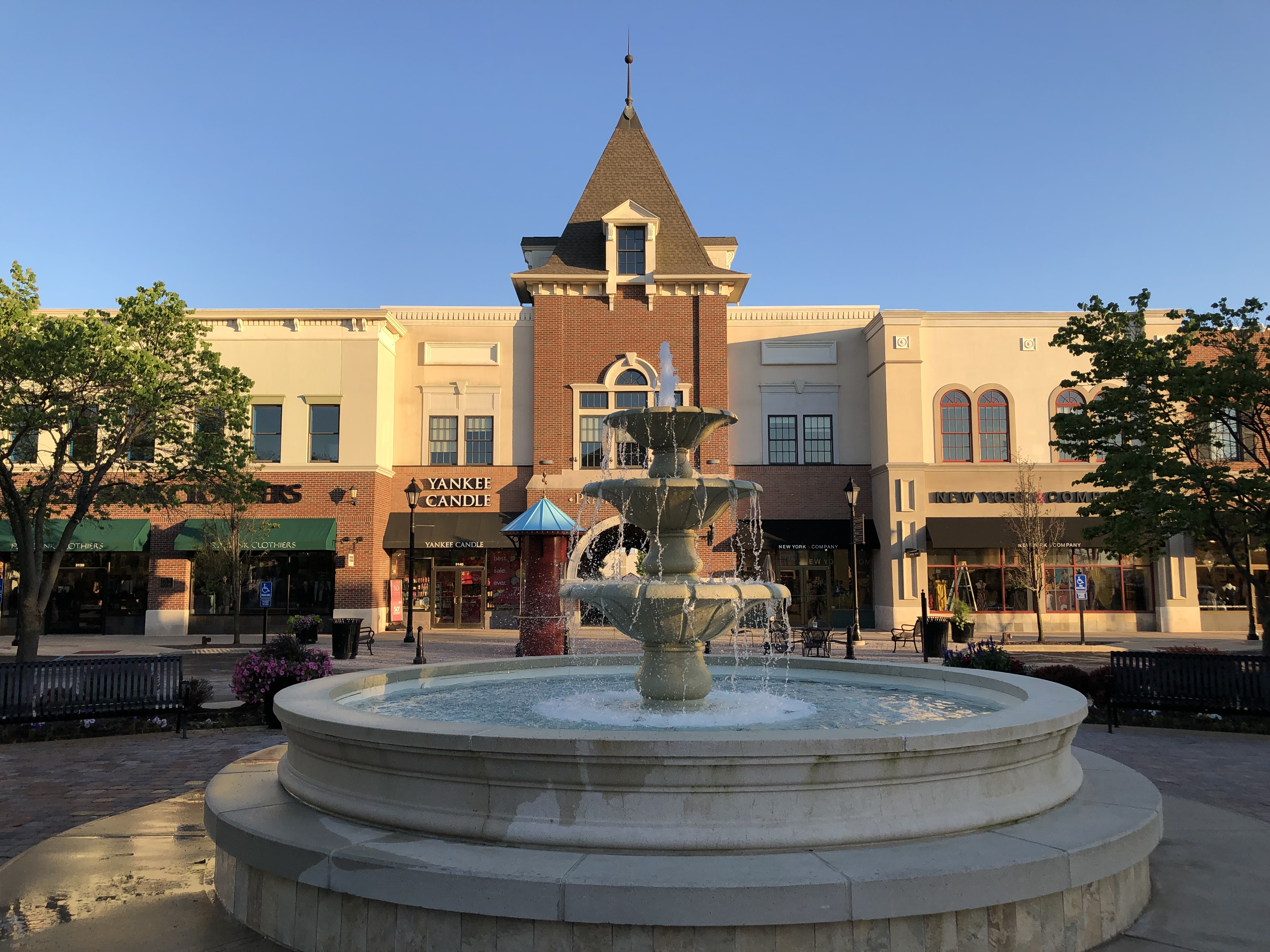
Levis Commons in Perrysburg

Notable companies based in Perrysburg include Burkett Restaurant Equipment, a dealer in food service equipment; Owens-Illinois, a global glass container manufacturer; and Universal Tube & Rollform Equipment, a metalworking machinery dealer specializing in tube mills, roll forming and coil processing equipment. Fox Software, creator of FoxPro, was also based in the city.

== Education ==
Perrysburg is home to The Islamic School of Greater Toledo, Saint Rose School and Perrysburg Schools, which includes a preschool, four elementary schools, one intermediate school, one junior high school and Perrysburg High School.

In the year 2016, 51% of Perrysburg residents over the age of 25 had a bachelor's degree or a higher level of education, compared to 31.7% of Wood County residents, 23% of residents in the Toledo MSA, 26.7% of Ohioans, and 30.3% in the U.S.

=== Library ===
The Way Public Library serves the Perrysburg area. In 2016, the library loaned 639,113 items and provided 726 programs to its 34,336 registered borrowers. Total holdings in 2016 were 93,416 print materials and 182 print subscriptions.

== Notable people ==
Statue of Commodore Oliver Hazard Perry, after whom Perrysburg is named

- Burke Badenhop, professional baseball pitcher in Major League Baseball
- Clara Blinn, pioneer who died in the aftermath of the Battle of Washita River
- Douglas Brinkley, award-winning historian, lived in Perrysburg from 1968 to 1982
- Bil Dwyer, cartoonist (Dumb Dora) and humorist
- T. J. Fatinikun, professional football player in the National Football League (NFL) and Arena Football League
- Jerry Glanville, NFL and college football head coach
- Jim Harbaugh, professional football player in the NFL and head coach in the NFL and college football
- John Harbaugh, head coach in the National Football League (NFL)
- Sam Jaeger, actor and screenwriter
- Ralph Wesley Judd, professional baseball player in Major League Baseball
- Charles F. Kurfess, Ohio Speaker of the House
- Lance K. Landrum, United States Air Force lieutenant general currently serving as the 23rd Deputy Chair of the NATO Military Committee
- Jim Leyland, professional baseball player and manager in Major League Baseball
- Chessy Rayner, socialite and interior designer
- Anna Tunnicliffe, 2008 US Olympic Sailing Team gold medalist

== External links/ Further reading ==
- Official website
- Franks, Gary L. The Founding and Survey of Perrysburg, Ohio; Collierville TN: InstantPublisher.com, 2018
