= Chessy Rayner =

American interior decorator

Chesbrough Lewis Rayner (née Hall; September 25, 1931 – February 26, 1998) was an American interior decorator, socialite, fashion editor and writer.

== Early life and family ==
Rayner was born on September 25, 1931, in Perrysburg, Ohio, to Richard Brown West Hall (1897–1959) and Chesbrough Lewis (1912–2004). She attended finishing school and Briarcliff College. After her parents' divorce, her mother remarried Iva S. V. Patcevitch, the chairman of Condé Nast.

In 1952, she married William P. Rayner, a stockbroker and later Condé Nast executive, at St. Thomas Church on Fifth Avenue. They had no children and divorced in 1989.

== Career ==
After marriage, she worked for Ladies' Home Journal, Glamour and finally, Vogue where she was fashion editor 1956 to 1964.

In 1967, she co-founded the interior design firm MAC II with Mica Ertegun (MAC being an acronym of "Mica and Chessy"). The firm focused on residential and commercial projects. MAC II's residential clients included Kenneth Noland, Bill Blass and Arnold Scaasi. Their commercial clients included Trade Development Bank, Banco Safra and the Carlyle Hotel. In 1997, Rayner published New York: Trends and Tradition, a book highlighting 27 interiors in New York City.

She was described as "one of the best-dressed and most-photographed fixtures of the Manhattan social scene."

== Illness and death ==
Rayner died of lung cancer at Memorial Sloan Kettering Cancer Center in New York City on February 26, 1998, at the age of 66. Her funeral, held on March 3, 1998, at St. Thomas Church, was "overflowing."

In 2011, 750 items from her estate were sold on One Kings Lane.

== Bibliography ==
- Rayner, William and Chesbrough. French Cooking By The Clock. New York City: New American Library, 1965. ASIN B0000CMYCB.
- Rayner, Chessy; Schezen, Roberto. New York: Trends and Traditions. New York City: Monacelli Press, 1997. ISBN 1885254741.
