= Mica Ertegün =

American interior designer (1926–2023)

- Born: Ioana Maria Banu; 1926; Bucharest, Romania
- Died: December 2, 2023 (aged 97); Southampton, New York, U.S.
- Occupations: Interior designer, philanthropist
- Known for: Founding MAC II
- Spouse: Ahmet Ertegün

Mica Ertegün was a Romanian-American interior designer and philanthropist.

== Early life ==
Mica Ertegün, born Ioana Maria Banu on October 21, 1926, in Bucharest, Romania, was the only child of Natalia Gologan and Gheorghe Banu, a prominent figure in King Carol II’s cabinet and an ally of King Michael I during World War II. Amid Allied air raids, Mica was sent to the family’s country estate. Following the 1948 abdication of King Michael and her father's imprisonment by the Communist regime, Mica and her husband, Stefan Grecianu, an aristocrat 15 years older, fled Romania, traveling via stateless refugee passports to Zurich. Initially penniless, they were supported by friends, staying at the Dolder Grand hotel and later moving to Paris, where Mica worked as a model. Eventually, they relocated to Canada, where Mica spent eight years working on a farm.

In the late 1950s, Mica traveled to New York City to meet a diplomat in hopes of securing her father's release. Though unsuccessful, she met the recently divorced Ahmet Ertegün, the co-founder of Atlantic Records, at a dinner. The two were married in 1961 after Mica obtained a divorce from Grecianu.

== Career ==
In 1967, she co-founded MAC II with decorator and author Chessy Rayner (with the MAC initials representing "Mica And Chessy"), focusing on residential and commercial projects. Ertegun's design projects have included the 1969 redesign of Saks Fifth Avenue's flagship store's fifth floor.

== Philanthropy ==
Ertegün's philanthropic efforts were numerous, with significant donations to the University of Oxford, establishing the Ertegun Graduate Scholarship Programme in the Humanities. Her contributions to cultural heritage include leading donations for the restoration of the Holy Edicule at the Church of the Holy Sepulchre in Jerusalem and the creation of the Mica and Ahmet Ertegun Atrium at Jazz at Lincoln Center in New York.

== Awards and honors ==
For her contributions to philanthropy, education, and British-American cultural relations, Ertegün was awarded an honorary CBE by Queen Elizabeth II in 2017. She was a 1993 inductee in the Interior Design magazine Hall of Fame along with her MAC II founder, Rayner. In 2023, she was added to the Architectural Digest AD100 Hall of Fame.

== Death ==
Mica Ertegün died, aged 97, at her home in Southampton, New York on December 2, 2023.
