= Susan Crocker =

American photographer

Susan Crocker (born 1940) is an American photographer. Her work is included in the permanent collections of the Whitney Museum of American Art, the Museum of Fine Arts Houston, and the Metropolitan Museum of Art. The Museum of Contemporary Photography in Chicago holds a collection of her photographs documenting the construction in the Chicago Loop from 1985 to 1987.

Crocker was a student at Briarcliff College from 1958 to 1962.
