= CaptiveAire Systems =

American ventilation system manufacturer

CaptiveAire Systems, Inc.
- Type: Private
- Founded: 1976
- Founder: Robert Luddy
- Headquarters: Raleigh, North Carolina, United States
- Area served: North America
- Products: Kitchen Ventilation; Fire Suppression; Grease Filters; Fans; Utility Distribution; Makeup Air; HVAC
- Website: captiveaire.com

CaptiveAire Systems is a privately held manufacturer of commercial kitchen ventilation systems in the U.S. along with heaters, fans, and HVAC equipment. The company, founded by Robert L. Luddy in 1976, is headquartered in Raleigh, North Carolina. Since its inception, the company has expanded from fire suppression to a variety of products including exhaust, pollution control, fire suppression and prevention, HVAC, and utility distribution.

== History ==
In November 1976, Robert L. Luddy started Atlantic Fire Systems, which sold automatic dry chemical fire systems to restaurants and industry.

In 1978, Ben Maynard, suggested to Luddy that he open a sheet metal shop to manufacture ventilation hoods and integrate the fire system.

In 1981, a separate company was formed for the ventilation business with the name “CaptiveAire". The company has continued to expand, acquiring several ventilation companies in order to expand its product line. In 2017, CaptiveAire entered the HVAC market with the release of a dedicated outdoor air system.

== Company and products ==
CaptiveAire has over 1,300 employees in its network of over one hundred sales offices in the U.S. and Canada and six manufacturing plants located in North Carolina, Iowa, Oklahoma, California, Pennsylvania, and Florida.

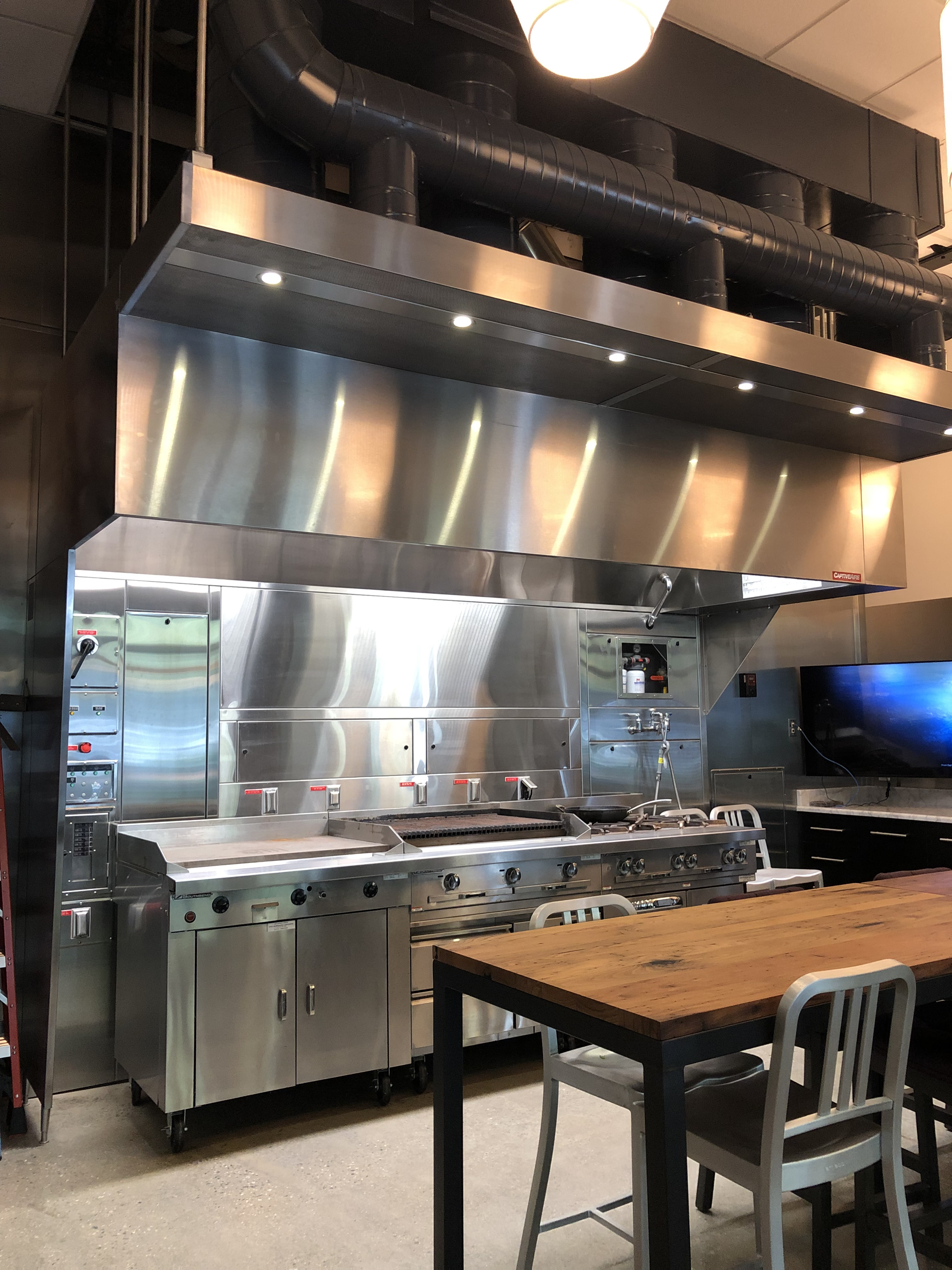
A commercial kitchen with a CaptiveAire exhaust hood, makeup air supply plenum, and utility distribution system.

== Community and awards ==
- Voted "Best in Class Overall" for ventilation systems 2013, Foodservice Equipment & Supplies magazine
- One of the top 50 fastest growing private companies in the Triangle area, Triangle Business Journal
