= Universal Tube & Rollform Equipment =

Manufacturing company

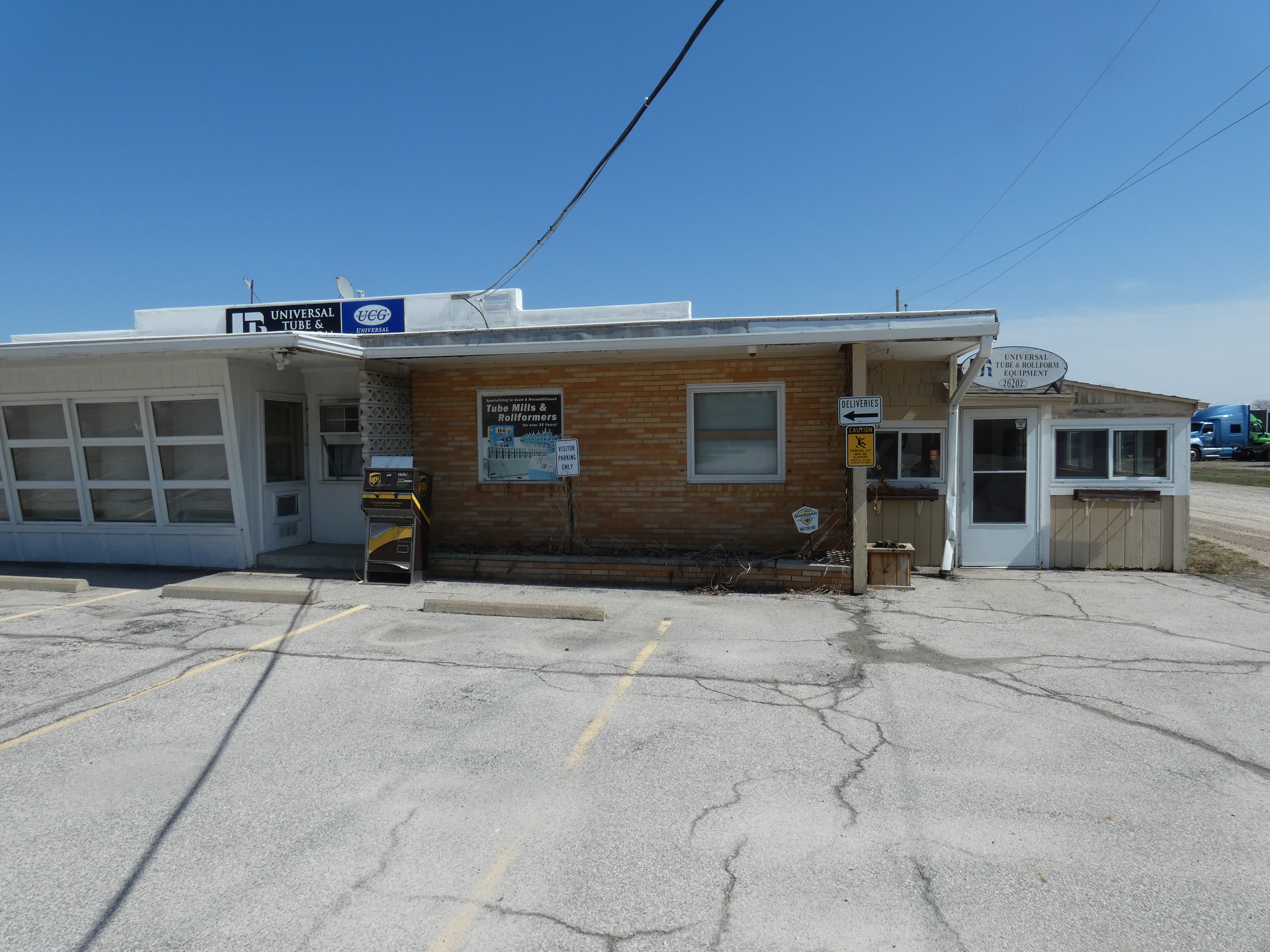
- Company's headquarters
- Founded: 1985; 41 years ago
- Headquarters: Perrysburg, Ohio, United States
- Website: www.utubeonline.com

Universal Tube & Rollform Equipment Corporation is an American manufacturer and supplier of industrial metalworking machinery used in the production of tubes and pipes that is based in Perrysburg, Ohio. Founded in 1985, the company specializes in buying and selling tube mills, pipe mills, and rollforming machines.

== Domain name ==
The company became known to much wider audiences because its original domain name uTube.com appeared to be very similar to YouTube.com. The company had purchased the domain name in October 1996. In August 2006, the company's website received 68 million hits that caused its web servers to crash. Many of the users intended to go to the video sharing website YouTube, but typed the homophonic "utube.com" into their browser instead. On October 30, 2006, the company took legal action against YouTube over the website confusion. The company has since moved their domain website to utubeonline.com in April 2007.

The case appears to have been settled in late 2007, when Universal Tube withdrew its opposition to several "YouTube" trademark filings by the video-sharing website, saying that, "The parties have settled their dispute."
