= Addison/Ripley Fine Art =

Art gallery in Washington, D.C.

Coordinates: 38.91263058789578°N 77.0662480255547°W

Addison/Ripley Fine Art is an art gallery in Washington, D.C. The gallery was established in 1981, in addition to being an independent commercial fine arts gallery, it also serves as an art consultant and curator to the Warner Building, Washington, D.C., and as art consultants to several Washington, D. C. private companies, as well as to the German Marshall Fund, Washington, D.C., and to the United States Department of State, Overseas Buildings Operation, Washington, D. C.

== Location and co-owner ==
The gallery is currently located in the Georgetown neighborhood of Washington, DC at 1670 Wisconsin Avenue NW, Washington, DC 20007. The co-owner, Christopher Addison, is a past president of the Art Dealers Association of Greater Washington, DC.

== Artists represented ==
Addison/Ripley represents several well-established national artists as well as several well-known Washington, DC area contemporary artists. Among the artists represented by the gallery are Wolf Kahn, Isabel Manalo, Joan Belmar, Carol Brown Goldberg, Frank Hallam Day, Amy Lin, Lou Stovall and Manon Cleary.

== Critical reception ==
Exhibitions at the gallery have been widely reviewed over the years by both local newspapers such as The Washington Post, Washington City Paper, and The Washington Times, as well as by national art magazines. In referring to some of the artists represented by the gallery, The Washington City Paper used terms as "the great D.C.-based photographer Frank Hallam Day...", while The Washington Post described painter Manon Cleary as "one of our finest realist oil painters for years." Modern Luxury Magazine also noted about artist Amy Lin that "...the 32-year-old... has nabbed the attention of top District curators, including the National Portrait Gallery’s Anne Collins Goodyear..."
