= Foodservice Equipment & Supplies =

- Categories: business magazine
- Frequency: Monthly
- Founded: 1948
- Company: Zoomba Group
- Country: United States
- Based in: Elmhurst, Illinois
- Language: English
- Website: Foodservice Equipment & Supplies magazine
- ISSN: 1097-2994

Foodservice Equipment & Supplies is a trade publication serving the information needs of dealers, broadline distributors, consultants and multi-unit operators who specify and purchase foodservice equipment and supplies.

== History and profile ==
Established in 1948, Foodservice Equipment & Supplies is published monthly. Regularly occurring articles included People & Events, Chain Profile, Facility Design Project of the Month, and Dealer Sales Representative of the Month. Former owner Reed Business Information sold off the title to the Zoomba Group in May 2010. the magazine is based in Elmhurst, Illinois. Its sister publication is Restaurant Development & Design, which was launched in 2012.

Foodservice Equipment & Supplies' Dealer of the Year award was recognized as the pre-eminent honor in foodservice distribution. This award dated back nearly a quarter of a century and recognized the industry's most outstanding equipment and supplies distributor. The winner was featured in the May cover story of Foodservice Equipment & Supplies each year.

At the end of each year, Foodservice Equipment & Supplies published their All-Star Issue, which took an in-depth look at exceptional industry performers. The 2007 issue was focused on convenience stores.
