= Company Gallery =

Gallery in New York City

Coordinates: 40°43′2″N 73°59′31.6″W

- Established: 2014
- Location: 145 Elizabeth St, Manhattan, New York City, U.S.
- Type: Gallery
- Founders: Sophie Mörner and Taylor Trabulus
- Website: companygallery.us

Company Gallery is a contemporary art gallery located at 145 Elizabeth Street in the Lower East Side neighborhood of Manhattan. It was established in 2015 by Sophie Mörner and Taylor Trabulus became a partner in the gallery in 2022.

== History ==
In 2003, Swedish artist Sophie Mörner started Capricious Magazine, devoted to the work of emerging photographers who were often also women and/or queer. The magazine soon expanded into a publishing initiative supporting feminist and queer journals. It also operated Capricious Space, a project space in Williamsburg, Brooklyn, which closed in 2011.

In 2013, the space re-opened as Capricious 88 on the fifth floor of 88 Eldridge Street in Chinatown, sharing a building with Miguel Abreu Gallery and David Lewis Gallery. By 2015, the gallery rebranded as Company. In 2021, Company moved to a 4,000 square-foot, standalone space on Elizabeth Street nearby, designed by BoND.

The gallery was recipient of the 2019 Frieze New York Frame award.

== Artists ==
Company Gallery has been representing the following artists:

- Tosh Basco
- Jonathan Lyndon Chase
- Yve Laris Cohen
- TM Davy
- Raúl de Nieves
- Hayden Dunham
- Sylvie Fleury
- Estate of Barbara Hammer
- Katherine Hubbard
- Colette Lumiere
- Reba Maybury
- Jeanette Mundt
- Women's History Museum
- Joanne Robertson
- Ambera Wellmann (since 2020, shared with Hauser & Wirth since 2023)
- Cajsa von Zeipel

In the past, the gallery worked with additional artists, including the following:

- Tiona Nekkia McClodden
