= Boffo =

Boffo may refer to:

== People ==
- Francesco Boffo (1796–1867), Swiss architect responsible for many buildings in southern Russia and Ukraine
- Dino Boffo (born 1952), Italian journalist
- Adolfo Bautista (born 1979), Mexican midfielder nicknamed "Bofo"

== Fiction ==
- Mister Boffo, a comic strip created by Joe Martin
- Phineas Boffo, a character in the TV series Carnivàle
- Boffo, a psychological trick employed by the witch Eumenides Treason in Terry Pratchett's Discworld series

== Other ==
- BOFFO, a nonprofit arts organization in Fire Island Pines, New York
- Boffo Games, a video game developer
