= BOFFO =

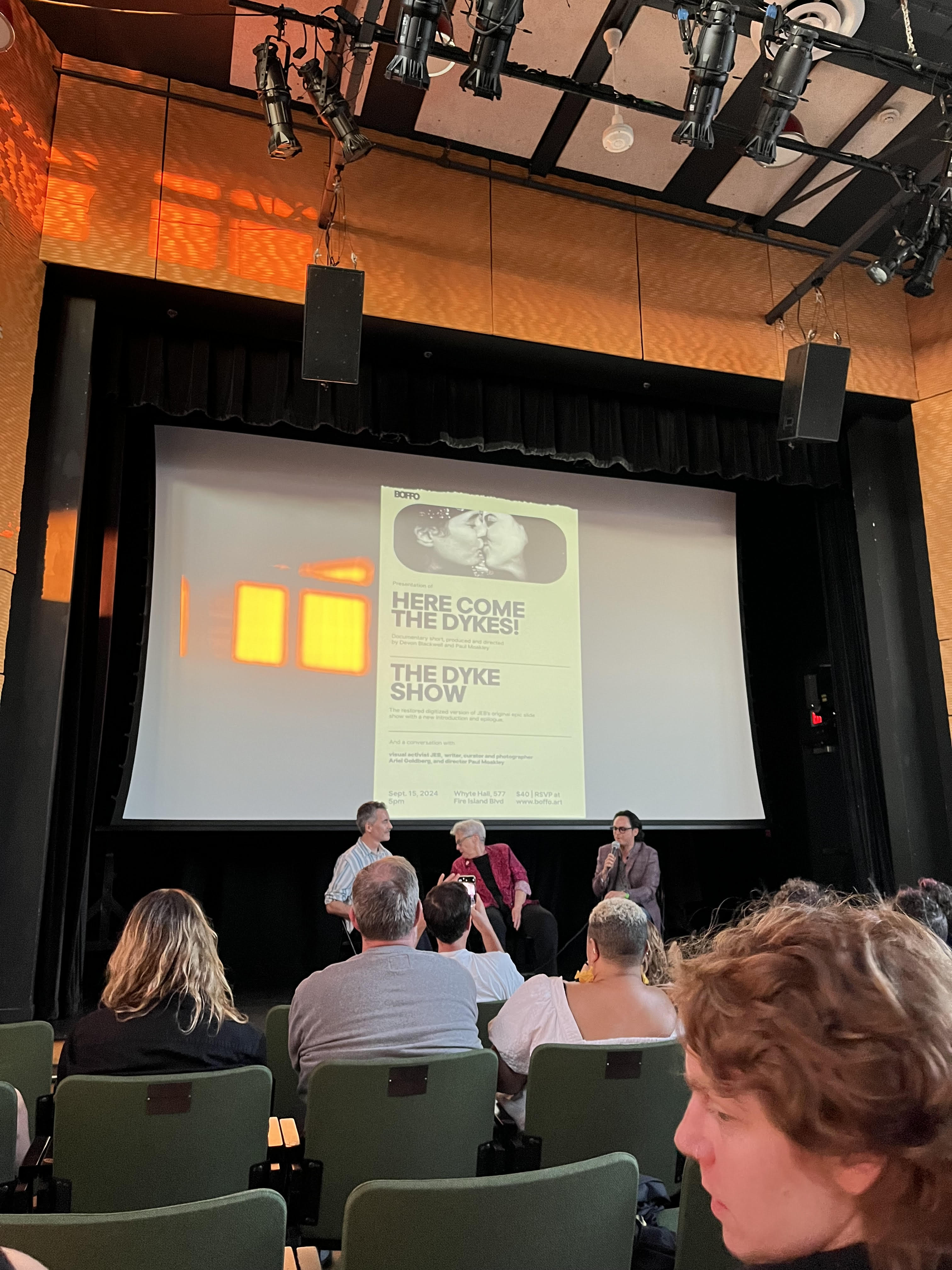
Joan E. Biren at BOFFO event

BOFFO is a nonprofit arts community and organization in Fire Island Pines, New York. Since 2009, BOFFO has presented the work of 700+ artists across a breadth of disciplines to share and perform work during the summer months. The multidisciplinary organization has aspects of both an artist residency program, with workshops and artist lectures, and a performance festival. At the end of each summer, the program hosts the Boffo Fire Island Performance Festival, which showcases experimental dance, performance, and music. Previous collaborators for the Performance Festival include OCDChinatown and Tavia Nyong'o. Notable past residents include Jeremy O'Harris, Robert Yang, Puppies Puppies, Ryan McNamara, Malik Gaines and Alexandro Segade, Precious Okoyomon, and House of Ladosha. The organization has published three books to-date: Talking to the Sun at Fire Island: Vol. 1, BOFFO Journal: Talking to the Sun, Summer 2024, and Talking to the Sun at Fire Island: Vol. 2.

== About ==
BOFFO was founded in 2010 by architect Faris Al-Shathir. In its earlier days, the organization paired designers, like Nicola Formichetti, with interdisciplinary artists, like Gage/Clemenceau, to create thoughtful pop-up art installations.

For BOFFO's inaugural season in 2012, curated by Cay Sophie Rabinowitz, the organization invited such artists as Whitney Biennial participant K8 Hardy and MoMA PS1 2010 Greater New York participant Ryan McNamara. Guest lecturers included architect Charles Renfro and art historian Douglas Crimp. In 2019, playwright Jeremy O'Harris hosted a one-night revival of Water Sports; or Insignificant White Boys (2015), the first script written by the artist.

== Notable Participants ==
- Tyler Ashley
- Math Bass
- Boychild
- Hannah Black
- Meriem Bennani
- Jonathan Lyndon Chase
- TM Davy
- DIS
- Queer Ecology
- Nicole Eisenman
- House of Ladosha
- Gogo Graham
- K8 Hardy
- Lyle Ashton Harris
- Jeremy O. Harris
- Kia LaBeija
- Wardell Milan
- Carlos Motta
- Ryan McNamara
- Raúl de Nieves
- Puppies Puppies
- Brontez Purnell
- Ser Serpas
- Casey Spooner
- Ssion
- Tabboo!
- Telfar
- Wu Tsang
- Matt Wolf
- Robert Yang
- Young Boy Dancing Group
