= Jessica Mitrani =

Colombian-born artist (born 1968)

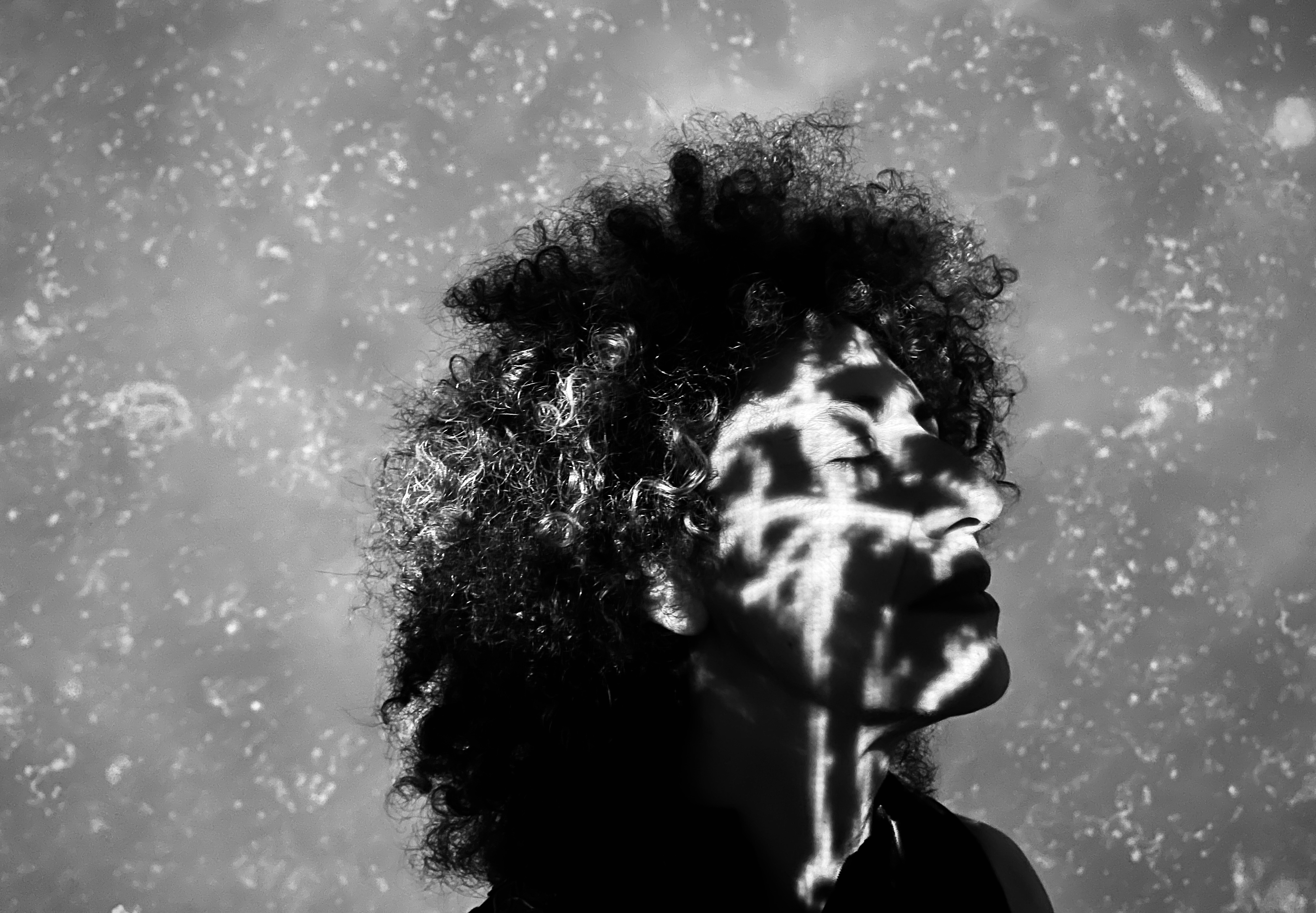
- Jessica Mitrani at La MaMa Galleria, 2022 (Ruvén Afanador)
- Born: 1968 (age 57–58); Barranquilla, Colombia
- Education: Universidad del Norte, Colombia (LLB, 1994); The New School (MFA Theatre, 2002)
- Known for: Performance art; Video art; Theatre
- Movement: Contemporary art

Jessica Mitrani (born 1968) is a Colombian-born, New York–based artist. She works in performance, theater, video, and objects and has exhibited her work at museums and galleries internationally, including OCDChinatown, New York; Tanya Bonakdar Gallery, New York; White Columns, New York; Brooklyn Academy of Music, New York; French Institute Alliance Française, New York; Centre Pompidou, Paris; Bogotá Museum of Modern Art; Marfa Film Festival, Texas; and Medellín Museum of Modern Art.

== Early life and education ==
Mitrani was born and raised in Colombia. She received a Law degree from Universidad del Norte, Colombia in 1994. She then received her Master of Fine Arts in Theatre from The New School University/Actors Studio Drama School, New York, in 2002.

== Work ==
Mitrani's work has been exhibited, screened, and broadcast internationally. Some of the videos she has written and directed include Rita Goes to the Supermarket (Oberhausen Film Festival), Headpieces for Peace (Grand Prix at the ASVOFF5 Festival at Centre Pompidou, Paris; Museo de Arte Moderno, Medellín), and La Divanée (Nowness, Marfa Film Festival, Oaxaca Film Festival). Her collaboration with the Civilians Theater Group, The Undertaking, was performed at the Brooklyn Academy of Music's New Wave Festival.

The artist received a grant from the Hermès Foundation to make the immersive film and performance work Traveling Lady, starring iconic Spanish actress Rossy de Palma, which appeared at Crossing the Line, New York; New Settings, Paris; Soluna International Music and Arts Festival, Dallas; Oslo World; and Liberatum Festival, Museo Universitario del Chopo, Mexico City.

Between 2016 and 2019, she directed and art directed two research-based television series (created and written in collaboration with Paula Parisot) for ARTE1 in Brazil: América Invertida and América Feminizada, showcasing the work of more than two hundred artists.

Mitrani's video To Reincarnate as a Palm Tree was commissioned for the exhibition Universos Desdoblados (Unfolding Universes) in 2019 at the Museum of Modern Art in Bogotá as part of the 45th Salón Nacional de Artistas in Bogotá, Colombia.

In 2020, Mitrani was invited by the Bogotá Museum of Modern Art to participate in the project De voz a voz (Word of Mouth), the first major artistic project of the pandemic in Colombia. Artists made works that were published by the newspaper El Tiempo. A museum exhibition that included all the original works was on view in September 2020. Mitrani's collage was chosen, along with that of five other artists, as a poster plastered through the streets of Bogotá, Colombia. A year later, Mitrani had a solo show, I Dreamt the Landscape Was Looking at Me (in collaboration with Alex Czetwertynski), also at the Bogotá Museum of Modern Art.

For the fall 2022 semester, Mitrani created a multimedia project as a Guest Artist at the Princeton Atelier, Lewis Center for the Arts.

== Collections ==
- Smith College
- Women Make Movies
- Videoteca del Sur
- Latin American Archives in New York
- Fundación Patrimonio Fílmico Colombiano in Bogotá
- Beit Hair Museum in Tel Aviv
- CUNY Film Studies
