= Independent Art Fair =

Art fair

Based in New York City, Independent organizes the annual art fairs Independent, devoted to 20th and 21st-century contemporary art, and Independent 20th Century, "featuring new perspectives on historically recognized artists alongside lesser known voices" of 20th-century art history.

Founded in 2010 by Elizabeth Dee and a consortium of galleries and curators as a means of challenging the typical format of art fairs, Independent grew out of Dee's earlier non-profit, X Initiative. Independent positions itself as a mission-driven curatorial enterprise rather than a conventional commercial trade fair, producing editorial content, research initiatives, and year-long public programming alongside its fairs. Galleries participate by invitation and nomination rather than open application, a model the organization has maintained since its founding.

== History ==
=== X Initiative ===
Independent's origins lie in X Initiative, a one-year experimental non-profit founded by Dee that occupied the former Dia Center for the Arts building at 548 West 22nd Street in Manhattan’s Chelsea neighborhood, after Dia Art Foundation director Philippe Vergne announced that the building would be vacated. Operating from March 2009 to February 2010, X Initiative was guided by a more than 50-member advisory board of artists, curators, and museum professionals, and was directed by curator Cecilia Alemani, with Massimiliano Gioni and White Columns director Matthew Higgs among its key collaborators.

Over its year-long run, X Initiative presented 12 exhibitions and more than 50 events, drawing more than 75,000 visitors. Its program included solo presentations by artists including Derek Jarman, Mika Tajima, Christian Holstad, Tris Vonna-Michell, Luke Fowler, Keren Cytter, and Fritz Haeg, as well as a major exhibition by Hans Haacke, Weather, or Not, and a survey of the Polish artist Artur Żmijewski. X Initiative also organized No Soul for Sale - A Festival of Independents in June 2009, a gathering of international non-profit spaces and artist collectives that was later restaged at Tate Modern in 2010.

X Initiative closed in February 2010 with a 24-hour public event called Bring Your Own Art, inspired by curator Walter Hopps's 1978 exhibition Thirty-Six Hours.

=== Founding ===
In early 2010, Dee announced Independent, a new project in the same Chelsea building. Matthew Higgs stayed on as founding curatorial advisor, a role he has since held.

The first edition of Independent opened in March 2010 with an international roster of roughly 40 galleries and non-profit spaces. Many were the artists’ first solo exhibitions in New York, including Artists Space presenting Duncan Campbell, gb agency presenting Robert Breer, Isabella Bortolozzi presenting Danh Vo, Johann König and Andrew Kreps presenting Jeppe Hein and Jordan Wolfson in a shared space, and Winklemann Gallery presenting Eve Sussman and Rufus Corporation.

From the outset, Independent sought to distinguish itself from a conventional trade fair. Higgs described the project's title as “something of a manifesto”. the fair would forgo the enclosed booths and numbered floor plans typical of art fairs in favor of an open, biennial-like layout and credited every participating gallery equally within a shared exhibition space.

=== Independent (2010-Present) ===
Independent's annual contemporary art fair, also named Independent, was held for five years in the Dia Center for the Arts building, before relocating in 2016 to Spring Studios in Tribeca, a multidisciplinary event venue that also became home to New York Fashion Week.

Through 2020 it was typically held during Armory Week in March before shifting to coincide with NYC Art Week in May.

In 2026, Independent moved to Pier 36, a roughly 70,000- to 75,000-square-foot venue on the Lower East Side, more than doubling the size of its previous home and allowing for a single-level layout with larger gallery presentations and site-specific commissions. The fair featured Comme des Garçons designer and founder Rei Kawakubo's first solo art fair exhibition. The move was designed in collaboration with the architecture firm Solid Objectives Idenburg Liu (SO–IL) and the design studio D_P_S (Diogo Passarinho Studio).

=== Independent Projects (2014) ===
In 2014, Independent organized Independent Projects, a second unmanned exhibition, featuring only solo presentations, staged in the former Dia building during the city's November auction season. Unlike Independent's art fair, Independent Projects was structured entirely around monographic gallery presentations. The initiative included a mix of small and blue-chip galleries and helped establish the solo-presentation format that defines Independent's programming.

=== Independent Brussels (2016-2018) ===
Between 2016 and 2018, Independent operated a European edition, Independent Brussels, in partnership with the city of Brussels, held at the Espace Vanderborght, a former department store and museum in the center of the city. The fair's 2018 edition was reframed under the curatorial leadership of guest curator Vincent Honoré, then senior curator at the Hayward Gallery in London.

The Brussels shows expanded the traditional art fair model, with the 2018 iteration notably featuring a performance program that filled the building's central atrium, alongside gallery presentations, commissioned works, and talks.

Independent Brussels ceased operating after its 2018 edition, citing difficulties with the space and competition within the smaller art market.

=== Independent 20th Century (2022-Present) ===
In 2022, Independent announced a new fair devoted to 20th-century art history. In collaboration with gallerists including Alma Luxembourg and Joseph Nahmad, the project was conceived by Dee, Higgs, and former managing director of the European Fine Art Foundation Sofie Scheerlinck who joined Independent in 2021.

The inaugural edition of Independent 20th Century took place in September 2022 at the historic Battery Maritime Building at the tip of Lower Manhattan, presenting roughly 30 galleries and more than 70 artists working between 1900 and 2000, with a particular focus on those deserving of wider recognition, including women artists and artists of color.

In 2026, Independent 20th Century relocated to Sotheby's New York galleries at 945 Madison Avenue, the Marcel Breuer designed building formerly home to the Whitney Museum of American Art, The Met Breuer, and the Frick Collection. The partnership marked the first time an art fair and auction house have united in New York.

== Programming ==
Beyond its two flagship art fairs, Independent produces a range of communications activities, publishing, research, and public-programming.

- New York Gallery History Project - A partnership with the Los Angeles–based non-profit Contemporary Art Library, launched in 2024, which builds an online archive documenting influential New York galleries past exhibition histories.
- Independent Features - A series of commissioned essays and scholarship by arts writers, critics, and historians on artists and galleries associated with Independent and Independent 20th Century, syndicated in part through partner publications.
- Previously Unknown - A podcast produced by Independent, featuring conversations with artists, dealers, and art-world figures on the fair's history and programming.
- Downtown Dealers - A live conversation series moderated by Elizabeth Dee, which brings together New York gallerists across generations to discuss their careers and approaches to the trade.
