= Nash Glynn =

American artist

Nash Glynn (born 1992) is an American artist working in painting, photography, and video. She is known for her nude self-portraits and minimalist landscapes and still lives. She frequently depicts herself in her paintings using a simple palette of just red, white, and blue. She has exhibited internationally at Company Gallery and Metro Pictures in New York, Vielmetter Los Angeles, the Victoria Miro Gallery and the Tate Modern in London, Maison Populaire in Paris, and the Latvian National Museum of Art.

== Early life and education ==
Glynn was born and raised in Miami, Florida and learned to paint while working at her father's set design shop.

She graduated with a BFA from Tufts University in 2014 and with an MFA from Columbia University in 2017. During graduate school, Glynn medically transitioned from male to female.

== Work ==
Glynn was a 2017–2018 Artist Fellow at the Leslie-Lohman Museum of Art.

In 2019, Glynn had a show at the non-profit gallery Participant, Inc. Titled The Future is Fiction, the show included paintings, drawings, videos, and photography, in each Glynn used her body as a medium to contemplate and probe categories such as "nature," "female," and "human." Glynn uses the transfeminine form in against fast changing ecologies, claiming that climate change is not only as a problem of representation, but also as a threat to essentialist gender ideologies, such as who will be allocated certain resources before others.

Later that year, Glynn delivered a talk on the artist and writer Claude Cahun as part of the New Museum's 2019 Art+Feminism Wikipedia Edit-a-thon.

In 2020, Glynn's solo show at OCDChinatown featured one colossus-like self-portrait. Actress Hari Nef describes the painting, Self Portrait with One Foot Forward and One Hand Reaching Out.

Glynn had her first solo exhibition on the West Coast of the USA at Vielmetter Gallery in 2022. Titled, Interiors, the ten-work show had some of her largest paintings to-date with an accompanying text by the writer John Belknap on four definitions of plot: a measured area of land; a building, chart, or diagram; a series of events consisting of an outline of the action of a narrative drama; or, a plan to accomplish a scheme. Critic Sarah Nicole Prickett wrote of her work, they are: "scenic, framable, and ruled by perspective; the inside world is paradoxically vast and unbounded." Glynn says that the show is full of contradictions and she tried, "to play with the sense that there is no negative space. That the spaces between things are as deeply definitive as the things themselves."

In 2023, Glynn exhibited two paintings at OCDChinatown gallery alongside paintings by the artist and poet Ser Serpas and the photographer Sam Penn (which included images of writer Thora Siemsen, a muse in Nan Goldin's work).

== Public collections ==
- Tate Modern
