= Lee Mary Manning =

American photographer (born 1972)

Lee Mary Manning (born 1972) is an American photographer and artist living and working in New York City. They are represented by Canada Gallery. They work with a range of digital and film cameras, often using point-and-shoots and 35mm film. Manning's photos typically represent everyday objects and encounters, and are often exhibited alongside found objects including restaurant napkins, plastic bags, or pharmacy receipts.

== Early life and education ==
Lee Mary Manning was born in Alton, Illinois in 1972. Manning expressed an early interest in cinema and photography, using their father's cameras and disposable cameras as a child. In 1994, they received a Bachelor of Arts in political science and government from Southern Illinois University in Carbondale, Illinois.

After graduating, Manning lived in San Francisco and London before moving to New York in 2007.

== Career ==
Manning is a self-taught photographer and first began taking photos of their everyday life while living in San Francisco in the 1990s. In the early 2000s, they began publishing their photography on their personal blog, unchanging window. From 2004 to 2019, they worked as a photographer and senior marketing manager at Gap, which fueled their personal photographic work.

Manning's work is included in the Whitney Museum's permanent collections, and has been exhibited in solo and group shows at institutions such as the Swiss Institute, Planthouse, and Kapp Kapp Gallery. Manning's editorial work has been featured in publications such as i-D, SSENSE, and Aperture.

Manning published their first book with Peradam Press in 2014, titled First Impressions of Greece. Their second book, Blueprint, was published in 2018 to accompany a solo show at Little Sister in Toronto, Canada.

In 2020, their writing was included in A Queer Anthology of Wilderness, alongside writers and artists such as Eileen Myles, Princess Julia, Olivia Laing, and Zoe Leonard. In the same year, they photographed the food of New York restaurant, Dimes, for its first cookbook, Emotional Eating.

In 2022, Manning was an artist-in-residence at the Mahler & LeWitt Studios in Spoleto, Italy, where they worked on a book, Grace Is Like New Music, published in 2023. A collaboration with the poet Brian Turner titled To Fall in Love with the World was published in the New York Times in 2023. They also curated the 12th Annual exhibition at White Columns in 2022, which featured artists such as Nan Goldin, Barbara Hammer, Terry Winters, and Luke O'Halloran. The exhibition was thematically influenced by the COVID-19 pandemic and the death of Manning's father, who died from the virus in 2020. It was positively received by art critics from Hyperallergic, The Brooklyn Rail, and Artforum.

In 2023, they were announced as the inaugural artist-in-residence at Lismore Castle Arts in Waterford, Ireland.
