= OCDChinatown =

- Established: 2018
- Location: 147 Lafayette Street, New York, NY, US
- Founder: Liutas MvH
- Website: ocdchinatown.com

OCDChinatown is a contemporary art space for sound, image, object, movement and thought located in a working Chinatown mall in Manhattan, New York. It was established in 2018 and is curated by Liutas MvH.

OCDChinatown features both emerging and established international artists, often prioritizing queer narratives. The mission of the project is rooted in the preservation of alternative histories while imagining new futures. Serving as one of the key launchpads for emerging Downtown artists’ careers, OCDChinatown is non-hierarchical in its curation.

In The New Yorker’s review of It’s Personal, writer Johanna Fateman described the space as having its own relational qualities, calling it "(...)a gallery that occupies a glass-walled booth in a Chinatown mall. The space's fishbowl quality suits the themes of gendered spectatorship(...)." Meanwhile, artist Nao Bustamante spoke to Cultured on the precipice of her exhibition Brown Disco, discussing the gallery’s intimate and experimental nature: "OCDChinatown is small, so there’s the opportunity to play with space in a way that may be more difficult in a large gallery or institution."; OCDChinatown's penchant for evocative curation was highlighted in artist and actress Hari Nef's Artforum review of Nash Glynn's exhibition Self Portrait with One Foot Forward and One Hand Reaching Out, where she wrote: “I enter the gallery, greeted by an image I hadn’t gone a day without thinking about since I first saw it…” OCDChinatown has played a key role in the development of the mall's previously, nearly empty, second floor. Transforming it into a vibrant, multifaceted marketplace, contributing to its reputation as a dynamic cultural and commercial hub in the neighborhood.

Eight exhibitions have been selected by Artforum critics as international "Must Sees," including Nash Glynn's Self-portrait With One Foot Forward And One Hand Reaching Out, Carlos Motta and Tiamat Legion Medusa's When I Leave This World, Camilo Godoy's Amigxs, Geo Wyex's Looking For Stars Out Of What Stinks, It's Personal (Nash Glynn, Sam Penn, Ser Serpas), Nao Bustamante's Brown Disco, Ethan James Green, Martine Gutierrez, and Sam Penn's Turn My Way, and E. Jane, Chelsea A. Flowers, Kearra Amaya Gopee, Shala Miller, Elle Pérez's I Am Standing Here Surrounded By So Much Beauty.

OCDChinatown has additionally been featured in Vogue, Interview Magazine, AnOther, The New York Times, Surface, The Brooklyn Rail, Hero, Screen Slate, ArtNet, Coeval, GAYLETTER, Airmail, Hyperallergic, and more.

== Selected Projects ==
In 2024, multidisciplinary artist K8 Hardy mounted her exhibition-turned-pop-up shop, Studio Dress, in which she transformed the typically sparsely curated space into a kitschy, maximalist auto body shop. The faux-shop featured an editioned house dress, created in part by former Miguel Andover designer Andrew Harmon, which served as the primary artwork and was accompanied by a weeklong performance of “shop-girldom.” The theatrical conceptualization of the space, led by set designer Andy Harmon and K8 Hardy, incorporated absurdist self-branding to anchor the artist's “studio dress” in both the fashion and fine arts spheres. The project's collaborations were furthered by a campaign shot by renowned fashion photographer Cass Bird, with muse-wife and former J.Crew creative director Jenna Lyons modeling, as well as a public relations campaign managed by New York upstart Gia Kuan. With Studio Dress, Hardy not only celebrated the playful and performative aspects of fashion, but also examined the ways in which art and commerce intertwine, inviting both critical reflection and a sense of joyful irreverence.

Earlier in 2024, New York-based photographer Sam Penn led Turn My Way, a show of five photographs that included Penn herself, actress and performance artist Martine Gutierrez, and fellow photographer Ethan James Green. The series explored themes of vulnerability, desire, and identity through self-portraiture, challenging traditional concepts of the gaze and representation. The exhibition text, written by Artforum's former editor-in-chief David Velasco, posed a question in relation to the bounds of self-portraiture with: “Can you imagine? Being both seducer and seduced.” The crux of the show lay in the intimate proximity the three artists shared, both personally and creatively, and their ability to blur the lines between public and private life. Their collaboration exemplified an exploration of selfhood and vulnerability, with each image offering a new perspective on identity and power. This piece of programming marked the second exhibition of Penn's work with OCDChinatown, furthering her investigation into the complexities of representation.

Curators Sara O’Keeffe, Emmet Pinsky, and OCDChinatown's Liutas MvH organized a multifaceted project with artist Pippa Garner in the fall of 2023. Garner's I'm With Me was presented at OCDChinatown in conjunction with her exhibition $ELL YOUR SELF at Art Omi in Ghent, New York. I'm With Me showcased work spanning over 30 years of Garner's prolific career, including enlarged satirical advertisements from Garner's various entries into San Francisco weeklies during the 1990s, a reimagining of the artist's early 2000s “t-shirt-a-day” slogan project, a sartorial fan-art made by fashion house Eckhaus Latta on their own archive and deadstock pieces, alongside a tattoo parlor. The former served as a repurposing project for the young designers, directly akin to Garner's tenets of her studio practice that reinfuse life into things that have been passed on, discarded, or are out of use. The latter opted for Garner's contemporary means of direct augmentation of the body and her apt precision in regards to performative works. The performance invited participants to receive a flash tattoo of the artist's selected works, applied by a range of invited tattoo, performance, and studio artists. Appointments were made available online, and the event encouraged voyeuristic engagement$. ELL YOUR SELF was accompanied by a monograph, co-published by Art Omi and Pioneer Works Press. Following these exhibitions, Garner's Act Like You Know Me was re-exhibited by White Columns, which was also accompanied by a publication of the same name.

Nao Bustamante's Brown Disco received its first iteration of the site-specific work at OCDChinatown, during her Rome Prize fellowship year. The installation featured a hanging 8-foot inflatable disco ball, a slowed-down Donna Summer soundtrack with an accompanying microphone that invited each visitor a moment for karaoke, and a singular spotlit painting. Paying "homage to the spatio-temporality that is the club," it distilled the atmosphere of nightclubs as spaces of both personal and collective expression. Brown Disco was equal parts a monument to lives lost in queer spaces of liberation and a place of pause for silent acts of reclamation. When referring to the work, writer Maggie Nelson—in conversation with Bustamante for Interview Magazine—noted her husband, artist Harry Dodge's remarks on some of the darker underpinnings of the piece: “And the shadows too, (...) Harry kept being like, ‘These are not glittering. These are architectural.’ And it almost felt like there was a panopticon, like honeycomb cells in a way that were not vibing freedom, per se.” Critics praised Bustamante's ability to enact participation through spatial activation and her use of cultural subversion to create a nostalgic environment, linking past cultural moments with contemporary concerns about identity, performance, and livelihood.

Earlier in 2023, Young Boy Dancing Group, and movement designer Sigrid Lauren, premiered a dynamic, two performances at The Firehouse, 87 Lafayette St., New York, NY. The performances unfolded across two distinct halls within the venue: the main firehouse and its adjacent garage. The first section took place within the fire trucks, where Lauren’s immersive sound design set the tone for the piece. After a brief interlude, the audience organically migrated into the garage space that used to house the firetrucks, where the second phase of the performance unfolded. Dancers from YBDG, including Dusty, Lili “Love” Marrero, Crackhead Barney, and the core crew consisting of Manuel Scheiwiller, Nica Roses and Maria Metsalu, were positioned strategically as the public entered to witness the 3-hour performance. The raw, industrial nature of the space was integral to the work's organic intensity and durationality. The performance responded directly to the materiality of the space, creating a visceral experience that blurred the lines between site-specific installation and live performance. The choreography engaged with the architecture, allowing the dancers to interact with the environment in a way that heightened the tension between movement, sound, and the space itself. Using the firehouse's historical design as a space to fill up the truck's, the performance included large amounts of water to add to its site-specificity.

In January 2023, It's Personal was presented as a collaborative exhibition by artists Ser Serpas, Sam Penn, and Nash Glynn. The show explored the complexities of intimacy and vulnerability. The press release, penned by hannah baer, encouraged each visitor to read it aloud and posed the critical questions of: “Who gets to look at women and girls? Who decides what happens to them? Who holds them in their gaze?” This interrogation of power dynamics and the act of looking was central to the exhibition, which blurred the lines between the personal and the public. Interview Magazine described the show as “sensual,” noting that it invited viewers to engage with complex portrayals of women, where desire, agency, and the politics of representation were at the forefront. The exhibition's opening was followed by a series of readings featuring prominent voices, including hannah baer, Kay Gabriel, Diamond Stingily, Sarah Nicole Prickett, and Gary Indiana. This dynamic programming extended the themes of It's Personal into a performative space, engaging with the exhibition's central question: "Who gets to look and who gets to be seen?" A review of the show in The New Yorker emphasized the exhibition's successful blending of personal and collective expression, where the artists’ works confronted notions of gaze, power, and identity.

Ryan McNamara presented Before I Forgot Myself in the summer season of 2022. The work invited visitors into an intimate, often absurdist world where performance, sculpture, and identity collided in playful and disorienting ways. The exhibition—a hybrid between a retrospective and a garage sale—offered an eclectic mix of McNamara's works from across 15 years, including never-before-seen props, photographs, and new pieces that carried his signature blend of self-mortification and wit. McNamara, who rose to prominence in 2010 with his project Make Ryan a Dancer, has long been known for transforming the mundane into something deeply performative, from costumed interventions to awkward, intentional failures that somehow made him a star. In this show, he revisited those boundary-pushing moments, providing a rare opportunity to directly engage with both the objects and the artist himself, as McNamara was present throughout to discuss each piece's origins and significance. An essay by Sarah Nicole Prickett, was shown alongside the exhibition, and reflected on McNamara's evolution as a performance artist and his exploration of the often uncomfortable space between vulnerability and spectacle. With Before I Forgot Myself, McNamara continued his investigation into the complexities of art and commerce.

In February 2022, OCDChinatown premiered When I Leave This World, a two-channel video installation by artist Carlos Motta, in collaboration with performance and body-modification artist Tiamat Legion Medusa. The exhibition centered Medusa's (Tiamat Legion Medusa, using it/its pronouns) transformative journey, both physical and conceptual, as it transitioned from human to reptile with the ultimate goal of becoming a dragon. The first video, Tiamat Legion Medusa (2022, 26 minutes), documented the artist recounting its traumatic childhood experiences, which fueled its desire to transform into a non-human form. Medusa described its metamorphosis as a “protest at humanity,” stating, “I don’t want to die looking like a human being when I leave this world.” The second video, When I Leave This World (2022, 10 minutes), captured Medusa's intense suspension performance, set to an original soundtrack by DJ and sound artist ELO. In this performance, Medusa's body was pierced with hooks and suspended in space, rotating slowly. When I Leave This World extended Motta's ongoing exploration of humanism and embraced a potential posthuman future, where the rejection of the human body as normative redefined both individual and collective identity. Following its presentation, the work was acquired by the Leslie-Lohman Museum of Art.

In June 2021, Colombian-born artist Camilo Godoy unveiled AMIGXS, a provocative body of work featuring eight framed black-and-white photographs and a striking new wall-sized photograph commissioned by OCDChinatown. The show's centerpiece, AMIGXS (Sammy) (2021), was a monumental portrait of artist and activist Sammy Kim, showcasing Sammy—arms open, legs modestly closed—to capture the interplay between exposure and privacy, intimacy and vulnerability. The juxtaposition of the size of imagery, a billboard-sized print and varying foot-long framed works, created a tension between the works themselves within the space of the exhibition. Godoy's work focused on classical references, drawing inspiration from classical nude portraiture, as well as the works of iconic queer photographers like Peter Hujar and Hudinilson Jr. In these portraits, desire was tangible: a tongue licked a beard, breasts pressed against bellies, and hands caressed bodies in tender, vulnerable ways. The exhibition also included issues of Godoy's zine that were available for browsing and purchase. AMIGXS went on to tour internationally.

In September 2020, SELF-PORTRAIT WITH ONE FOOT FORWARD AND ONE HAND REACHING OUT, a monumental painting by Nash Glynn, was presented at OCDChinatown. The four-foot canvas depicted the artist herself—naked and striding through a forested landscape toward a distant rainbow. Over the course of a year, Glynn slowly painted this striking piece, blending serenity with emotional intensity. The exhibition was presented in a unique, intimate format, where only one viewer at a time could experience the work. This approach underscored the deeply personal and transgressive nature of the painting. As a transdisciplinary artist, Glynn's work engaged with themes of identity, transformation, and transcendence. The painting's movement was transduced into stillness, while its potential opened a new path for personal and collective revaluation. In the January 2021 issue of Artforum, actress and writer Hari Nef featured the opening and the work in her essay, OPENINGS: NASH GLYNN. Of the artist, Nef wrote:

"Her body is pink and toned, perched in contrapposto at the edge of a classic American landscape. She’s a colossus. There’s green at her feet—definitely grass, some pines maybe, a smear of amber near the horizon. The landscape submits to the Yves Klein blue of a sky she’s turning toward, collapsing longitude and altitude in the lean of her hip. Clouds bloom around and above her; they’re mauve, like the ones at sunset over a beach town. Except there’s no sun in the sky, no source of pink to crush purple in a white cloud. In the absence of sun, there is Nash Glynn, her body turning away. But her head is turned toward me. She looks down at me. She extends her hand. Or maybe she’s pointing. Just visible on the horizon is a rainbow."

This painting, acquired by the Tate Modern, is celebrated for its emotional depth and formal innovation. It marked a pivotal moment in Glynn's career that further solidified her place in the contemporary art world.

In September 2019, OCDChinatown and BOFFO co-curated the New York City performance debut of Young Boy Dancing Group (YBDG) with an exhibition comprising photographs and objects. The group, initiated in 2014 as a nameless collective, had since expanded its practice to include video, photography, fashion, sculpture, and installation. However, YBDG was perhaps most recognized for their raw and intimate performances, where bodies in motion intersected with light in visceral, often destabilizing ways. The group's core values resisted mainstream commodification and cultural polish, advocating for somatic exploration, communal release, and a rejection of sexualization. The exhibition at OCDChinatown showcased eight color photographs of anonymous, often headless or limbless bodies stacked in acrobatic, surreal poses—reminiscent of cadavre exquis or the gender-fluid imagery of Brassaï. For its Artforum review, Scott Indrisek noted the performances sacramental movements: “It’s sloppy, sensual, vicious, absurd, the sort of thing you’d want a safe word for. The group staggers around, dead-eyed, with elaborate hair, like zombies who happen to hang out in Eckhaus Latta, drugged into some arcane ritual they don’t even understand.” The three core members, Manuel Scheiwiller, Maria Metsalu, and Nica Roses, use these sculptural moments, born from structured improvisations, to echo the collective's performance ethos. The two live performances took place on September 6 and 7, where clothing and other remnants were left behind in the space. YBDG's ongoing exploration of identity, performance, and body politics was underscored by this multifaceted presentation, marking a significant milestone in their evolving dialogue with both the art and performance worlds.

It has collaborated with the arts organization BOFFO for the 2019, 2021, 2022, and 2023 BOFFO Performance Festival Fire Island held in the Fire Island Pines. In August 2019, BOFFO and OCDChinatown presented the fifth edition of the BOFFO Fire Island Performance Festival, Dancing in the Face of Adversity, a celebration of the LGBTQ+ community's rich history of dance as both cultural expression and resistance. Held from August 2–4 at Fire Island Pines, the festival featured performances by nine artists and collectives, including Young Boy Dancing Group (YBDG), who made their U.S. debut, as well as immersive works by Ryan McNamara and an operatic collaboration between Richard Kennedy and Gay Baker. The performance SPIT! Manifestos—a collaboration by Carlos Motta, John Arthur Peetz, Carlos Maria Romero, Camilo Godoy, Jason Guevara/Jenn D’Role, and Vivian Crockett—also made an exciting return. Additionally, works from Bichon (Karlo Bueno Bello), ELSZ, West Dakota, Sebastian Hernandez, and Papi Juice were presented. The 2019 festival set the stage for ongoing curatorial collaborations, with additional performances and partnerships in 2021, 2022, and 2023. These subsequent years saw the festival evolve with new performances and installations that pushed the boundaries of dance, identity, and community-building. BOFFO remained a powerful declaration of performance's ability to bring people together, fuel resistance, and reimagine what was possible for collective joy and transformation. Additional selected artist collaborations with the festival include: BEARCAT, Gage of the Boone, Tavia Nyong’o, Dia Dear, Vinson Fraley, NIC Kay, Keioui Keijaun Thomas, Macy Rodman, Jonah Almost, Sausha De La Ossa, Fashion LaBeija, Maxi Hawkeye Canion, Fernando Casablancas, Kyle Kidd, reed rushes, Tess Dworman, devynn emory, Ms.Z, Dangerous Rose, Raven Valentine, Kiyan Williams, Maya Margarita, Joseph McShea & Edgar Mosa, and Hannah Black.

In February 2018, Michel Auder premiered Trumped_Phone Content No.27, a new work that marked the first installment in his forthcoming series of "phone content" films. The piece was a meditation on the personal and political, offering an introspective stream of consciousness through seemingly random still images sourced directly from Auder's phone. The work captured fleeting moments of daily life, using the mundane as a backdrop for a broader reflection on the turbulent realities of the contemporary moment. Auder's signature approach—casually virtuosic and deeply confessional—pushed the boundaries of traditional video art, intertwining the intimate and the critical in a raw, unfiltered display.

In 2018, New York and Los Angeles-based designers Mike Eckhaus and Zoe Latta of Eckhaus Latta were among OCDChinatown's first pieces of programming, presenting a large-scale installation that ruminated on the relationship between commercial and retail forms. This marked the beginning of a series of pop-ups for Eckhaus Latta, later culminating in their preeminent exhibition Possessed at the Whitney Museum of American Art. The duo later went on to establish their flagship store in the same Two Bridges Mall as the gallery.

== Artists and collaborators ==
- Devan Diaz, Sebastian Acero, Fern Cerezo, Jan Anthonio Diaz, Chuy Medina, Jessica Mitrani, Reynaldo Rivera and Cruz Valdez
- K8 Hardy in collaboration with Andy Harman, Cass Bird, and Jenna Lyons
- E. Jane with Chelsea A. Flowers, Kearra Amaya Gopee, Shala Miller, Elle Perez
- Ethan James Green, Martine Guitierrez, Sam Penn
- Lavinia Eloise Bruce
- Pippa Garner
- Nao Bustamante
- Sigrid Lauren and Young Boy Dancing Group
- Nash Glynn, Sam Penn, Ser Serpas
- Geo Wyex
- Ryan Ponder McNamara
- Carlos Motta and Tiamat Legion Medusa
- E. Jane
- Camilo Godoy
- Elliot Reed
- Carlos Martiel
- Nash Glynn
- Jessica Mitrani
- Luke O'Halloran
- Young Boy Dancing Group
- ThreeAsFour
- Jessie Stead
- Joseph Teeling
- Ian Giles
- Sam Roeck
- Lord of Beef
- Michael Auder
- Eckhaus Latta
