= Studio Museum in Harlem =

Art museum in New York City

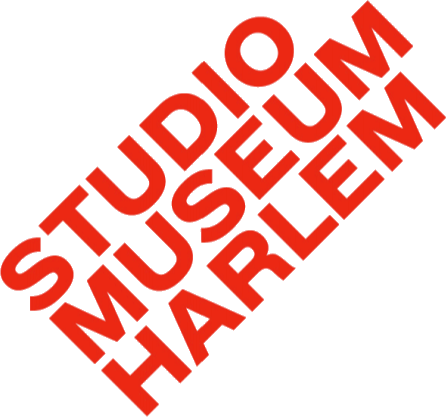

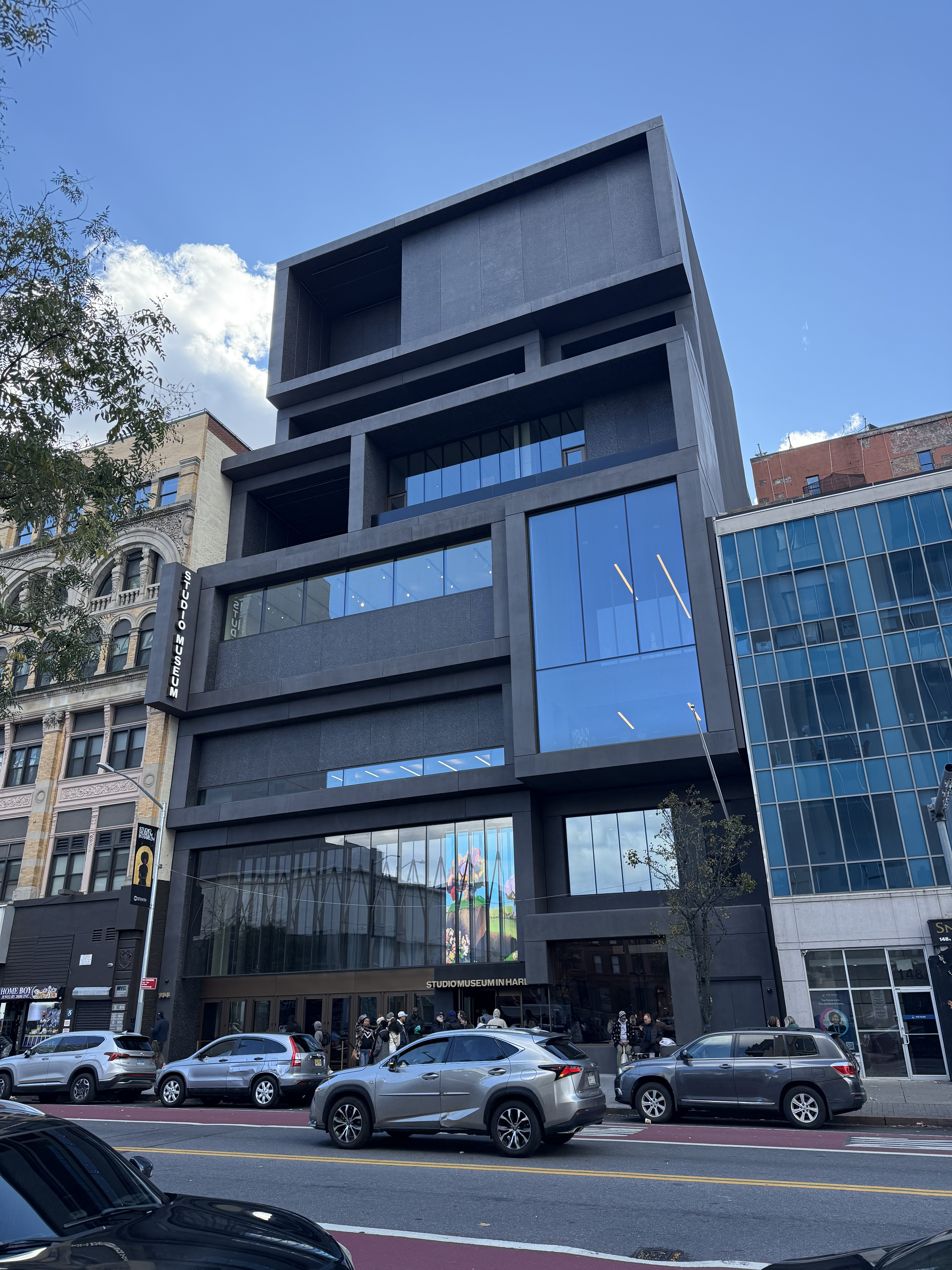
- The Studio Museum in November 2025.
- Established: 1968; 58 years ago
- Location: 144 West 125th Street; Manhattan, New York City
- Coordinates: 40°48′30.52″N 73°56′51.12″W
- Director: Thelma Golden
- Public transit access: Subway: to 125th Street; Bus: M7, M60 SBS, M100, M102, Bx15
- Website: studiomuseum.org

The Studio Museum in Harlem is an African-American art museum at 144 West 125th Street in the Harlem neighborhood of Manhattan, New York City, United States. Founded in 1968, the museum collects, preserves and interprets art created by African Americans, members of the African diaspora, and artists from the African continent. Its scope includes exhibitions, artists-in-residence programs, educational and public programming, and a permanent collection. The museum building was demolished and replaced in the 2020s; a new building on the site opened in November 2025.

Since opening in a rented loft at Fifth Avenue and 125th Street, the Studio Museum promoted the works of artists of African descent. The museum's Artist-in-Residence program has supported over one hundred graduates. A variety of educational and public programs include lectures, dialogues, panel discussions and performances, as well as interpretive programs, both on- and off-site, for students and teachers. The exhibitions program has also expanded the scope of art historical literature through the production of scholarly catalogues, brochures, and pamphlets.

== History ==
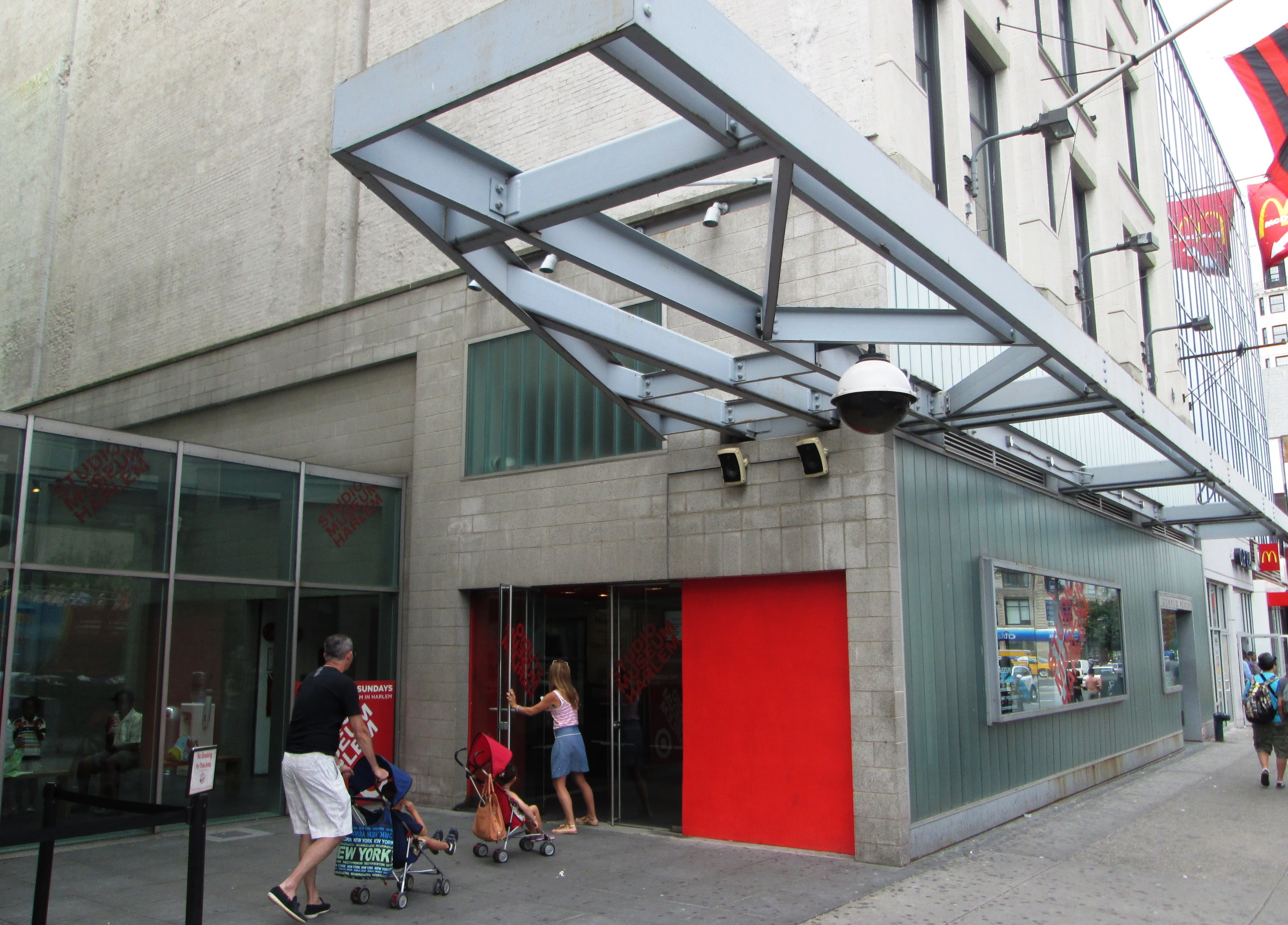
Entrance (2013)

The Studio Museum was developed by a diverse group of founders in the belief that the African-American community should include a museum as part of its everyday experiences. Mahler B. Ryder was a founding secretary. It opened in 1968 in a rented loft, the Studio Museum in Harlem moved to its present location in 1982, where it focuses on exhibiting works by artists of African descent.

Upon its September 1968 opening, the museum faced substantial backlash from local Harlem residents, artists, and community activists who questioned its identity and underlying institutional motives. Much of the suspicion arose from the museum's funding structure and governance, which relied heavily on wealthy, White "downtown" philanthropists and civic figures, rather than on the neighborhood's Black cultural leadership. Critics from the local community voiced concerns that the institution would serve as a tokenizing political tool.

This friction escalated over the choice of the museum's first exhibition in September 1968, Electronic Refractions II, a solo show by African American kinetic sculptor Tom Lloyd, who worked primarily in abstraction to create technology-driven light works. Lloyd's abstract light works—constructed from electronic components like traffic light lenses—drew intense criticism from activists aligned with the Black Arts Movement. Opponents argued that the museum's curation favored safe, apolitical abstraction to conform to the standards of mainstream White institutions, like the Museum of Modern Art, rather than addressing the realities of Black Harlem. According to historical accounts by artist Ed Spriggs, this culminated on opening night when an attendee physically attacked and smashed one of Lloyd's light sculptures, declaring that the abstract art did not belong in a Black museum.

From 1970 to 1978, Gylbert Coker, the first chief curator of the museum, arranged for the saving and cleaning of the Works Progress Administration Federal Art Project murals in Harlem Hospital that were done by Charles Alston. She curated exhibitions, among them, Bob Thompson's Hale Woodruff: 50 years of His Art, and Contemporary African American Photographers.

Originally, the museum focused on workshops and programs designed to give artists a space to practice create works and show them. This idea led the museum to start an Artist-in-Residence program. The proposal for the studio component of the museum was written by the African-American painter William T. Williams, who believed it was important to have Black artists working and exhibiting in the Harlem community. Williams and sculptor Melvin Edwards cleaned up the former industrial loft space at the museum's original location at 2033 Fifth Avenue (at 125th Street) for conversion into artists studios. The first artist to work in the top floor studio space was printmaker and sculptor Valerie Maynard.

The museum also maintains an education department; in the 1970s, artists Janet Henry and Carrie Mae Weems worked in the Education Department.

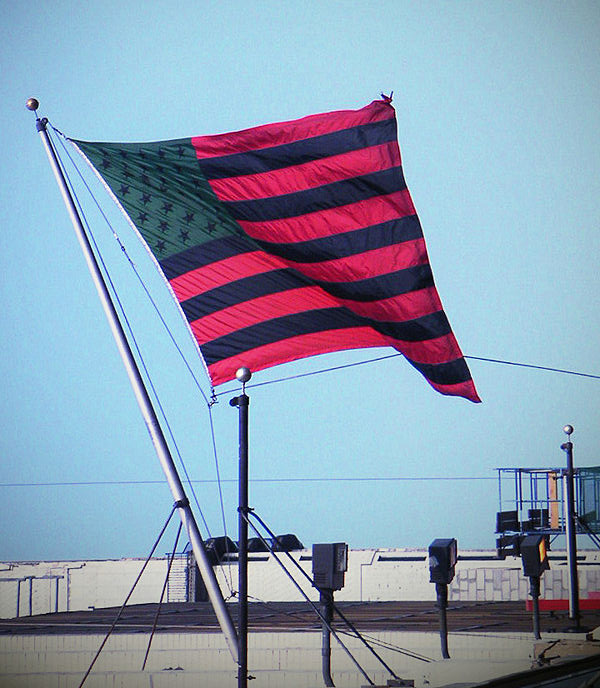
David Hammons' African-American Flag (1990) flying outside the museum

In 2001, Rogers Marvel Architects designed the building's entry pavilion, exhibition spaces and auditorium, as well as other facilities.

The museum's Artist-in-Residence program celebrated its 40th year in 2010, helping to cultivate the careers of more than one hundred artists.

Naima Keith, a former associate curator, created exhibitions during her tenure, including: "Rodney McMillian: Views of Main Street" (2016), "Artists in Residence 2014–2015" (2015), "Charles Gaines: Gridwork 1974–1989" (2014), "Titus Kaphar" (2014), "Glenn Kaino" (2014), "Robert Pruitt" (2013), "The Shadows Took Shape," co-curated with Zoe Whitley (2013), and "Fore," co-curated with Lauren Haynes and Thomas J. Lax (2012).

When the Museum opens its new space at 144 West 125th Street, the inaugural exhibit will features works by Tom Lloyd "the innovative artist whose practice was the subject of the Studio Museum's inaugural exhibition in 1968 [Electronic Refractions II]". On June 27, 2024, the Andy Warhol Foundation for the Visual Arts awarded the Studio Museum a $100,000 grant to provide exhibition support for the Tom Lloyd show. It will also exhibit new works on paper by alumni of the Artist-in-Residence program

=== New building at 144 West 125th Street ===
In 2015 award-winning architect David Adjaye — whose firm Adjaye Associates designed the Smithsonian Institution's National Museum of African American History and Culture — was commissioned to design a new home for the Studio Museum in Harlem, which will allow the museum to expand its exhibition schedule. In 2021, Studio Museum announced that it had raised $210 million for the construction, endowment and operating fund for its new building. By 2023, the museum had severed its relationship with Adjaye in response to allegations of sexual harassment and misconduct against the architect. Work on the new museum building on 125th Street in Manhattan continued, and the building opened on November 15, 2025. The building cost $160 million. In advance of the official opening, Studio Museum hosted a gala at the new building, raising over $3.7 million.

The new building has a facade made of glass and gray precast concrete, with openings of various sizes, and is seven stories high. Inside are five stories of exhibit spaces covering 82,000 square feet (7,600 m^{2}), and there is a roof terrace on the top floor. The museum building is centered around a design feature that resembles an inverted staircase, a reference to the stoops outside nearby houses. The building also has a studio, a theater, a cafe, and educational facilities.

A mosaic depicting the previous museum building is located nearby in the 125th Street station on the Lenox Avenue subway line in a mosaic designed by Faith Ringgold.

== Museum directors ==
The museum's first director was Charles E. Inniss. Directors since that time have been Edward Spriggs, Courtney Callender, Mary Schmidt Campbell, Kinshasha Holman Conwill, Lowery Stokes Sims, and Thelma Golden, its current director. In October 2024, the Ford Foundation gave the museum a $10 million grant to fund an endowment for its director and chief curator positions.

== Artist-in-residence program ==
Each year, the Studio Museum offers an 11-month studio residency for three local, national, or international emerging artists working in any media. Each artist is granted a free non-living studio space and a stipend. Artists have access to the museum's studios and are expected to work in the studio a minimum of 20 hours per week and participate in open studios and public programs. At the end of the residency, an exhibition of the artists' work is presented in the museum's galleries.

Artist	Year of residency
Mequitta Ahuja	2009–10
Njideka Akunyili	2011–12
Sadie Barnette	2014–15
Kevin Beasley	2013–14
Sanford Biggers	1999–2000
Chakaia Booker	1995–96
Jordan Casteel	2015–16
June Clark	1996–97
Gregory Coates	1996–97
Bethany Collins	2013–14
William Cordova	2004–05
Sonia Louise Davis	2023–24
Louis Delsarte	1979–80
Abigail DeVille	2013–14
Lauren Halsey	2014–15
Allison Janae Hamilton	2018–19
EJ Hill	2015–16
Jibade-Khalil Huffman	2015–16
Texas Isaiah	2020–21
Steffani Jemison	2012–13
Lauren Kelley	2009–10
Autumn Knight	2016–17
Simone Leigh	2010–11
Eric N. Mack	2014–15
Jeffrey Meris	2022–23
Meleko Mokgosi	2011–12
Devin N. Morris	2022–23
Sana Musasama	1983–84
Marilyn Nance	1993–94
Jennifer Packer	2012–13
Kamau Amu Patton	2010–11
Malcolm Peacock	2023–24
Julia Phillips	2016–17
Valerie Piraino	2009–10
Zoe Pulley	2023–24
Elliot Reed	2019–20
Tanea Richardson	2007–08
Andy Robert	2016–17
Jacolby Satterwhite	2020–21
Tschabalala Self	2018–19
Paul Mpagi Sepuya	2010–11
Xaviera Simmons	2011–12
Sable Elyse Smith	2018–19
Cullen Washington, Jr.	2012–13
Charisse Perlina Weston	2022–23
Kehinde Wiley	2001–02

== Collection ==
The Studio Museum's permanent collection contains approximately 2,000 works, including drawings, pastels, prints, photographs, mixed-media works, and installations. It comprises works created by artists during their residencies, as well as pieces given to the museum to create a historical framework for artists of African descent. Featured in the collection are Terry Adkins, Laylah Ali, Romare Bearden, Dawoud Bey, Skunder Boghossian, Frederick J. Brown, Stephen Burks, Elizabeth Catlett, Robert Colescott, Gregory Coates, William Cordova, Melvin Edwards, Kira Lynn Harris, Richard Hunt, Hector Hyppolite, Serge Jolimeau, Lois Mailou Jones, Jacob Lawrence, Norman Lewis, Wardell Milan, Philome Obin, Howardena Pindell, Betye Saar, Merton Simpson, Nari Ward, and Hale Woodruff, among others. The museum is also the custodian of an archive of the work of photographer James VanDerZee, a chronicler of the Harlem community during the 1920s, '30s, and '40s. In 1985 the museum was the recipient of the Award of Merit from the Municipal Art Society of New York City in recognition of its outstanding Black art collection.

== See also ==
- List of African-American firsts
- List of museums focused on African Americans
- List of museums and cultural institutions in New York City
