= Elliot Reed =

American dancer and performance artist

Elliot Reed (born 1992) is an American dancer and performance artist. Their projects span dance, video, performance, and sculpture and explores the relationship between physicality, time, and systems. Reed has shown internationally at venues like MoMA PS 1, New York, Kunsthaus Glarus, Switzerland, and The Getty Museum, Los Angeles. Reed is a 2019 danceWEB scholar, 2019–20 Artist in Residence at The Studio Museum in Harlem, and recipient of the 2019 Rema Hort Mann Emerging Artist Grant.

== Early life and education ==
Reed was born in 1992.

Reed graduated from The School Of The Art Institute Of Chicago with a BFA in 2011 and will graduate from the Institut Chorégraphique International - CCN Montpellier with an MA in Choreography in 2023.

== Work ==
As of 2014, Reed is the founder, director, and sole employee of Elliot Reed Laboratories. This is a production office located within the artist's body. Elliot Reed Laboratories holds a copyright with The Library of Congress and a Los Angeles County business license. In 2017, Reed's performed COMEDY at Nous Tous Community Gallery in Los Angeles's Chinatown.

Reed's 2018 performances included the group performance in tribute to his great grandmother, America's Procession, and 500 Questions where Reed and a cast ambled around the Getty Museum in uniform repeating only question words. Another performance, Two Business Women Trek To An Undisclosed Location, had Reed direct two business women to walk from one end of Union Station Los Angeles Metro system to the other end. For Reed's Studio Museum residency, Reed drafted an account of the Ed Buck case. The project included self-performed choreography of vocalization and movement.

Reed is a frequent collaborator with performance artist Ron Athey. In 2021, at Participant Inc, Athey and Reed replicated the human printing press for an audience who could only see the artwork via the non-profit gallery's windows. For the accompanying MoMA PS1 piece, Reed had on a cardinal's cloak and recited "the indictment of the Swarovski family for its alleged complicity with the Nazis during World War II."

For edition FIVE curated by artist Nina Chanel Abney for Jack Shainman gallery director Joeonna Bellorado-Samuels's roving gallery, We Buy Gold, Reed showed Quarantine Ballet (2020). The video was constructed from five smartphone recordings.

Reed contributed to MIT Press's The Dance Review Winter 2020 edition with an essay on Performance Art Is…

In 2021, Reed exhibited, This Longing Vessel: Studio Museum Artists in Residence 2019–20, alongside artists E. Jane and Naudline Pierre at MoMA PS 1. The installation featured several sculptures, painted walls that referenced the color of his digitally scanned, and a multichannel video based on the crimes of Ed Buck, a contributor to Democratic politics in California. Buck was accused of handing out drugs that led to the deaths of Black men whom he'd hired for sex. Later that year, Reed show,Three Works, at OCDChinatown in New York. The show took on the theme and explored the very definition of “Drawing." In March 2021, Reed performed, Enter the Facilitatrix, at Monmouth University.

Late in 2021, Reed showed in Switzerland for the first time at Kunsthaus Glarus. The exhibition, titled Rhythm, included various video works, a green room lit with a neon, 4 Yamaha motorbikes and 4 speakers, a wall of knives halfway installed into the wall. They showed alongside Bri Williams and Puppies Puppies. Reed was on a panel with Art + Practice's Public Programs and Exhibitions Manager Joshua Oduga to converse on Ellliot's history as an artist and the intersection of technology, collaboration, and sculpture.
