= Ryan McNamara =

American artist (born 1979)

Ryan Ponder McNamara (born 1979) is an American artist known for fusing dance, theater, and history into situation-specific, collaborative performances. McNamara has held performances and exhibitions at Art Basel, The High Line, Dallas Symphony Orchestra, The Whitney Museum, MoMA P.S.1, and The Kitchen amongst other places.

== Early life and education ==
McNamara was born and raised in Arizona.

He studied photography at Arizona State University and graduated with a MFA at Hunter College in New York City.

== Work ==
McNamara typically works in with sculpture, drawing, video, and performance. The artist has described his work as "under-your-bed" art and, more recently, image-heavy collaborative performances nicknamed "readymade choreography." Writer and critic Alex Fialho notes that the artist often uses "the stage as a medium in itself."

McNamara participated in the 2nd Athens Biennale in 2009 with a video work titled, "I Thought It Was You." The work featured two screens portraying the artist enacting a spontaneous dance alongside a Herbie Hancock recording.

In 2010, the artist performed one of his most ambitious projects to date: “Make Ryan a Dancer.” Over the length of five months and under public scrutiny and surveillance, the artist took to the task of learning ballet, contact improvisation, and exotic dancing, amongst other dance styles, at MoMA PS1.

McNamara's solo show at Elizabeth Dee gallery in 2012, "Still," transformed the gallery space into a chaotic trompe l'oeil photography studio. The studio included backdrops and props, found objects, set pieces and costumes, and rolling cameras overseen by the artist and assistants. The eerie and improvisational images invoked the surrealist impulses of artists Lucas Samaras and Jimmy DeSana. Later that summer, McNamara and artists K8 Hardy, T.M. Davy, and Paul Sepuya attended BOFFO, a queer arts and performance residency on Fire Island founded by architect Faris Saad Al-Shathir.

In 2013, McNamara was named the winner of Performa 2013’s Malcolm McLaren Award. Titled, "MEEM: A Story Ballet About the Internet," the thirty-one dancers and performance ensemble re-enacted various internet clips featuring George Balanchine, “West Side Story,” Janet Jackson, K-pop, and more.

Curated by Piper Marshall, McNamara's 2015 show, "Gently Used," repurposed costumes from previous performances and gallery lighting into campy and ambitious sculptural and time-based works. Later that same year, McNamara collaborated with musician Dev Hynes for a one night-only performance, "Dimensions," that fused dance, soul, and opera into a kaleidoscopic meditation at the Perez Art Museum.

In 2016, McNamara's re-purposed MoMA PS1 back into a choreographed school. The piece, titled "Ryan McNamara Presents: Back to School," rooms and viewing spaces were emptied out and turned into classrooms; performers acted as teachers, administrators, goths, preps, jocks, and cheerleaders.

For part of the Works & Process series at the Guggenheim Museum in 2017, McNamara collaborated with John Zorn to re-stage a commedia dell'arte that included just under a dozen dancers, a jazz trio, an a cappella quartet, and the nooks and crannies of the museum space itself. Roberta Smith of the New York Times writes of McNamara's performances as an, "increasingly impressive transition from performance art to choreography."

The following year, McNamara performed an updated iteration of his ME3M performance, "ME3M 4 Boston," at the ICA Boston. That same year, he performed "Battleground" at the Guggenheim Museum. "Battleground" was one of McNamara's most ambitious projects to date. For the piece, McNamara collaborated with nine contemporary dancers, including Reid Bartelme, Jason Collins, Dylan Crossman, Fana Fraser, John Hoobyar, Kyli Kleven, Sigrid Lauren, Mickey Mahar, and Brandon Washington. The dancers partook in a cosplay-battle-ballet choreographed for the idiosyncratic architecture of the theater at the Guggenheim. Audience members acted as witnesses to the three groups' battle in "The Red Choir Loft," "The Green Balcony," and "The Blue Stage."

In 2018, McNamara showed a collection of goopy sculptures and dolls for an exhibition at ASHES/ASHES called, "I.L.L.I.S. & I.S.L.I.F. (It Looks Like It Sounds & It Sounds Like It Feels)."

For the 2019 BOFFO Performance Festival, McNamara performed A Quote by Frank O’Hara or Something Like That alongside Brandon Washington, Aaron Burr Johnson, Victor Lozano, and Oisín Monaghan. McNamara also curated a group exhibition at Baby Company gallery, called "Fire" that same year. Artists included in the group exhibition were A.L. Steiner, Cajsa von Zeipel, Kia LaBeija, Matthew Leifheit, Nicole Eisenman, Paul Sepuya, Raúl de Nieves, and Wolfgang Tillmans amongst many others.

McNamara presented a suite of new drawings and a live performance, called "The Consolations," at Company gallery in 2020.

"Before I Forgot Myself," is a 2022 exhibition at OCDChinatown that brings together a collection of artworks and video works from the artist's studio and archives over the past fifteen years.

== Influences ==
McNamara has a range of influences including dancer and choreographer Merce Cunningham, composer John Zorn, artist Thomas Lanigan-Schmidt, the Internet, New York's club kids, ballet, SAGE, science fiction, and more.

== Personal life ==
As of June 2020, he is married to David Velasco. He is a vegetarian.

== Selected performances and exhibitions ==
- Before I Forgot Myself, OCD Chinatown, NY 2022
- Still Life, The Bunker, Palm Beach, FL, 2021
- Cavern of Fine Gay Wine & Video, Hauser & Wirth, NY, 2021
- The Consolations, Company Gallery, NY, 2020
- A Quote by Frank O’Hara or Something Like That, Boffo Performance Festival, Fire Island, NY, 2019
- Dyke Dads Fag Fathers, Sotheby’s, NY
- Fire, Baby Company, New York, NY
- ME3M 4 Boston, ICA Boston, Boston, MA, 2018
- Battleground, Guggenheim Museum, New York, NY, 2018
- Commedia del Arte, with John Zorn, Guggenheim Museum, New York, NY, 2017
- Awareness Raising and Befriending Schemes, Frieze Projects, New York, NY, 2017
- Divided States of America, The LGBT Center, New York, NY, 2017
- Ryan McNamara Presents: Back to School, MoMA PS1, Queens, 2016
- Several Interventions Over the Course of Two Hours, The Power Plant, Toronto, 2016
- Battleground, Guggenheim Museum, New York, NY, 2016
- Dimensions, with Dev Hynes, Perez Art Museum, Miami, FL, 2015
- The Poseurs, A Dance, with K8 Hardy, The Whitney Museum of American Art, New York, NY, 2015
- Gently Used, Mary Boone Gallery, New York, NY, 2015
- ME3M 4 Miami, Miami Grand Theater, Miami Beach, 2014
- Misty Milarky Ying Yang, The High Line, New York, NY, 2014
- Rockaway!, Rockaway Beach Club, MoMA PS1, The Rockaways, NY, 2014
- ME3M, Performa13, New York, NY, 2013
- Ryan McNamara’s Candid, Brand New Gallery, Milan, Italy, 2013
- Pose, MOVE!, SESC, Sao Paulo, Brazil, 2013
- And Introducing Ryan McNamara, Collectorspace, Istanbul, Turkey, 2013
- Still, Elizabeth Dee, New York, NY, 2012
- Moscow Biennale for Young Art, Moscow, Russia, 2012
- This Charming Man, Bulletin Board, 208 Bowery, New York, NY, 2012
- II, Watermill Performance Center, Water Mill, NY, 2011
- On Shuffle, Lehmann Maupin, New York, NY, 2011
- Card Ending in 5589, Art Basel, Miami Beach, FL, 2011
- Meditation, Repetition, Trance, Mendes Wood, São Paulo, Brazil, 2011
- Collaboration with Michele Abeles, Public Art Fund, New York, NY, 2011
- Jack Smith: Thank You For Explaining Me, Barbara Gladstone Gallery, New York, NY, 2011
- And Introducing Ryan McNamara, Elizabeth Dee, New York, NY, 2010
- The Whitney Houston Biennial, Whitney Museum of American Art, New York, NY, 2010
- Greater New York, MoMA PS1, New York NY, 2010
- Forever, The Kitchen, New York, NY, 2010
- Ryan McNamara Presents: Klaus von Nichtssagend, The Musical, Klaus von Nichtssagend Gallery, New York, NY, 2009
- Stars!, Salon 94 Freemans, New York, NY, 2009
- 2nd Athens Biennale, Athens, Greece, 2009
- Ryan McNamara Presents: Bernie, the Magic Lady, Art Production Fund Lab, New York, NY, 2009

== Collections ==
- Whitney Museum of American Art, New York
- The Museum of Modern Art, New York

== Awards and Grants ==
- Foundation for Contemporary Art Grant
- ArtMatters Grant
- Performa Malcolm McClaren Award
