= Women's History Museum =

American fashion and art organization

For women's history museums, see Category:Women's museums

Women's History Museum is a fashion label and art collective co-founded by Amanda McGowan and Mattie Barringer in 2015. In lieu of traditional runway shows, they launched a biennial in 2019 and stage exhibits with Company Gallery, the Ukrainian National Home and at other locations.
