= Gregory Coates =

American artist (born 1961)

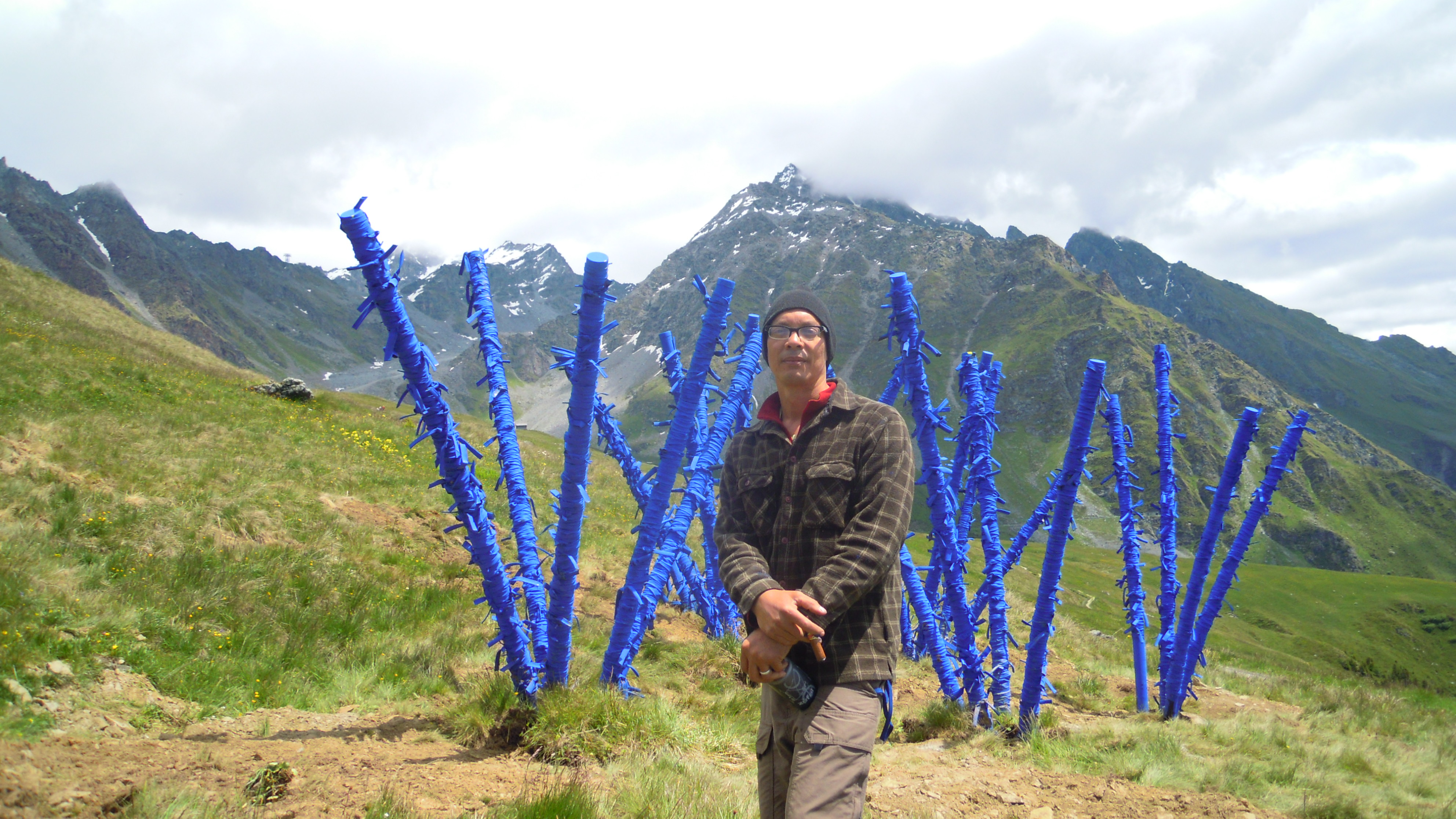
- Coates in 2011
- Born: March 5, 1961 (age 65); Washington D.C.
- Education: Corcoran School of Art, Skowhegan School of Painting and Sculpture
- Style: Social abstraction three-dimensional art video performance

Gregory Coates (born March 5, 1961) is an African-American artist known for working in the realm of social abstraction. Coates also works in three-dimensional formats including wall sculpture, sculpture in the round, installation art, and public sculpture, and less frequently in video and performance.

== Early life and education ==
Gregory Coates was born in Washington, D.C., on March 5, 1961. He grew up in the Carver Langston Neighborhood in the North East part of the district. Coates, the oldest of eight children, grew up in a working class household where his mother and father worked to support him, his six sisters and brother. .

Gregory Coates attended the Corcoran School of Art in Washington, D.C., from 1980 to 1982 and later the Skowhegan School of Painting and Sculpture 1990.

== Career ==
During the mid 1980s Coates moved his art studio to Düsseldorf, Germany. While in Germany Coates experienced events leading up the fall of the Iron Curtain and the impact of those changes. Upon returning from Europe, Coates began living in Williamsburg, Brooklyn.

Coates met artist Al Loving during the late 1980s, through his (now) wife Kiki Nienaber. He was working primarily as a figurative painter and Loving encouraged Coates to extend his practice into assemblage. Coates credits this as a breakthrough that allowed him to embrace the physical aspect of painting and to mature as an artist.

Then during the late 1990s Coates took an artist residency in Cape Town, South Africa. In 1996 Coates experienced aftermath of the official end of apartheid and encountered extreme poverty, which resulted in another shift in his work via the use of repurposed materials. He saw this as a moral imperative in response the gross wastefulness of industrialized societies and the economic inequities he witnessed while living in Cape Town. As a result, Coates began using almost exclusively, recycled materials to create his work. Materials used included feathers, bike tubes, cardboard, crumpled papers, dirt, vinyl records, and the heads of push brooms, which he pairs with provocative titles to address topics such as the problematics of Cold-War politics, poverty, racism, domestic labor, and Black aesthetics.

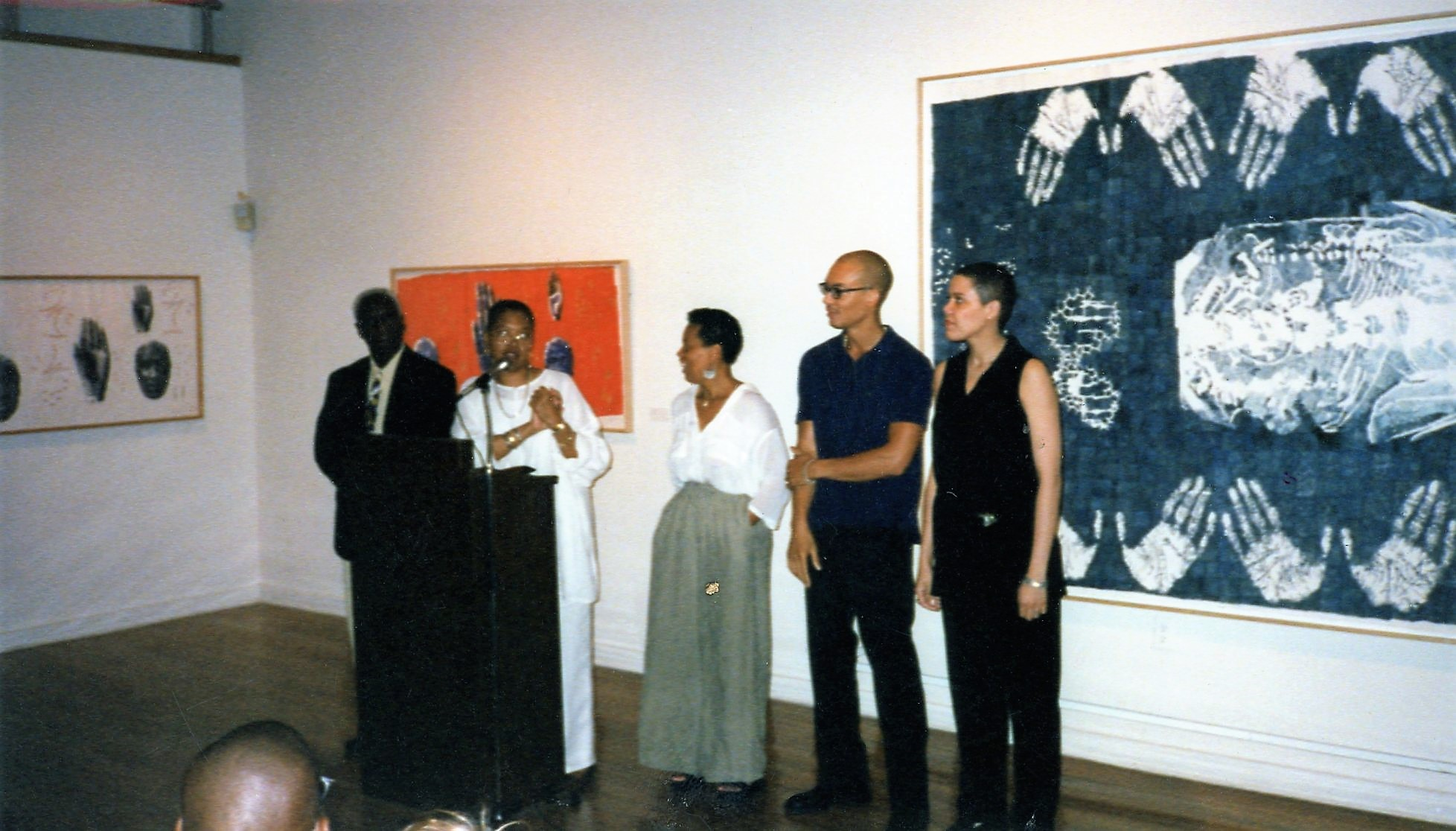
SMH Director Kinshasha Holman congratulates 1996 -1997 Artists in Residence June Clark, Gregory Coates and Vladimir Cybil

== Collections ==
- Smithsonian National Museum of African American History and Culture
- Pennsylvania Academy of Fine Art
- Georgia Museum of Art
- The Studio Museum in Harlem
- Kamigamo Shrine in Kyoto, Japan.

A large commissioned work by Coates is installed at the Pennsylvania Convention Center (Extension) in Philadelphia, Pennsylvania. Coates did a residency and installation in Verbier 3-D Foundation in Verbier, Switzerland in February 2011, in a series called "Go Tell It on the Mountain: Towards a New Monumentalism."

== Awards ==
Awards that he has received includes the "Joan Mitchell Foundation and The Pollock-Krasner Foundation Grants".

He was also presented with "Adolph and Esther Gottlieb Foundation (Emergency) Grant".
