= Elizabeth Dee =

American art dealer

Elizabeth Dee is an American art gallery owner. She is the founder of Independent Art Fair and the Elizabeth Dee Gallery.

== Art career ==
=== Gallery ===
The gallery has exhibited artists Alex Bag, Mark Barrow, Derek Jarman, Harry Dodge and Stanya Kahn, Jeff Keen, Miranda Lichtenstein, Virgil Marti, Ryan McNamara, Josephine Meckseper, Carl Ostendarp, Adrian Piper, Meredyth Sparks, and Ryan Trecartin, amongst many others.

=== Events ===
X Initiative took place in 2009-2010 at the former Dia Center for the Arts in New York. Dee is also the co-founder of Independent, a hybrid collective exhibition forum highlighting international galleries and non-profit spaces which takes place annually.

=== Publications ===
She has also co-published monographic publications on Josephine Meckseper (Sternberg Press), Ryan Trecartin (Dee/Rizzoli Skira) and Meredyth Sparks (Monografik Editions) and is the co-editor of the X Initiative Yearbook (Mousse Publishing, Milan).

== Film production ==
Elizabeth Dee has co-produced ten movies by Ryan Trecartin including I-Be AREA (2007) and the seven video cycle Any Ever (2007-2010) which includes: Trill-ogy Comp (2009): Sibling Topics (section a), K-CoreaINC.K (section a), P.opular S.ky (section ish), Re'Search Wait'S (2009-2010): Temp Stop (Re'Search Wait'S), Roamie View: History Enhancement (Re'Search Wait'S), The Re'Search (Re'Search Wait'S) and Ready (Re'Search Wait'S).
