= Jeffrey Lew =

American visual artist (born 1946)

Jeffrey Lew (born 1946) is an American visual artist and one of the co-founders of White Columns and Greene St. Recording at 112 Greene Street. As a visual artist he is known for having been a minimalist sculptor as well as an Installation artist.

In 1968 Lew purchased the building at 112 Greene Street which is where the art gallery White Columns opened as an alternative exhibition venue and performance space. Lew co-founded the gallery with fellow artists Gordon Matta-Clark and Alan Saret. White Columns survives today as New York City's oldest alternative non-profit art space in the West Village neighborhood of Manhattan.

Lew's work was included in the 1976 exhibition "Rooms" at MoMA and their 1971 "Brooklyn Bridge Event". His work is included in the institution's permanent collection.
