= Alex Bag =

American artist

Alex Bag (born 1969) is an artist working primarily in video. She currently resides in Glen Ridge, New Jersey. Her work is largely influenced by television, which she finds to be "the most awful thing. But I can't stop watching it..." She has performed at The Knitting Factory and lectured at Yale University, Parsons School of Design, Cal Arts, and The Getty Research Institute.

== Life and work ==
Bag received her BFA from Cooper Union and had her first solo exhibition at 303 Gallery only three years after graduating. Her work has been shown at the Gagosian Gallery, P.S. 1, Tate Gallery, Centre Georges Pompidou, Museum of Modern Art, Philadelphia Museum of Art, and numerous spaces internationally.

Her father worked in advertising and Bag sometimes visited his sets as a child, which she regarded as "something just as exciting and important as traditional kinds of fine art." Her mother also worked in television as the host of popular children's program The Carol Corbett Show, later becoming the host of The Patchwork Family. Bag appeared on the show at the age of four to interview a monkey.

In the December 2004 issue of Artforum, David Rimanelli remarked that “Alex Bag belongs on the Top Ten every year, whatever she does." Bag has also shown with Galerie Almine Rech in Paris in 1999, American Fine Arts Co. in New York (2000 and 2002), The Whitney Museum of American Art (2009), and was represented by Elizabeth Dee Gallery, where she exhibited in 2004 and 2009, until late 2011. She is currently represented by Team Gallery, Inc., where she had a solo exhibition in March 2012. This exhibition, which was in part a collaboration with Patterson Beckwith, featured compilations from Bag's public access television program from 1994 to 1997 with a "hodge-podge of the artists’ punk-rock fueled antics interspersed with clips that resemble The Soup-style recaps of the week’s talk shows."

Though similar to Pop Art in its appropriation of pop culture and mass media, Bag adds political criticism to her work. "There are so many good things about Pop art, but other things I think are awful. The Pop artists accepted their place and time and allowed themselves to reference the world around them, look at it, be inspired by it, examine it, not be so isolated from it, not be in an ivory tower. At the same time, however, they limited their scope by focusing primarily on surface presentation. They repeat popular imagery without saying anything, really; it's devoid of politics" (Frankel, David,"TV, or not TV: David Frankel on Alex Bag").

== Selected works ==
- In "Fall '95 (1995)", this video documents the fictionalized life of the New York City art school School of Visual Arts student, played by Bag herself. Taking the form of a video diary, Bag's character addresses the camera directly, expressing her thoughts on life and art, which mature significantly over the course of eight semesters. Interspersed between these entries are clips commenting on a variety of topics including male aggression, mockingly portrayed by toys, and video art from the 1970s.
- In "Untitled (Project for the Andy Warhol Museum) (1996)", Bag recreates the act of channel surfing in this video composed of short segments of ads, self-help shows, soap operas, and news programs recreated by the artist herself.
- In "Le Cruel et Curieux Vie du la Salmonellapod (2000)", a collaboration with Ethan Kramer, Le Cruel et Curieux Vie du la Salmonellapod is a nature documentary about an imaginary animal with feathers and tentacles. The animal is shown attacking a terrier and reproducing in upstate New York.
- "The Van (2001)" was installed in a van with leather and fake pink fur interior, this video presents Bag in the roles of three made-up artists as they are driven to the Leroy Leloupe Gallery by its owner. The three discuss their work, their outfits, and career aspirations.
- "Crackup (2002)" is a series of C-prints, Bag posed as a series of different characters with bulging orbs for eyes. The frames have built in speakers activated by the viewer squeezing a big pink button. In one photograph, Bag sits on a therapist's couch while the dialogue says "I want to start you immediately on morphine for the hopelessness, Prozac for the dejection and guilt...and Zoloft for the unbearable sense of dread." In another, Bag poses in front of a Blockbuster and discusses the store's promotional use of the word "love."
- In "Coven Services for Consumer Mesmerism, Product Sorcery, and the Necromantic Reimagination of Consumption (2004)", Coven Services is Bag's imaginary PR firm and advertising agency, serving clients such as Monsanto Company, Bechtel, and AOL Time Warner. This installation at Elizabeth Dee Gallery consists of wall collage, framed finished advertisements and video. The wall collage includes Polaroids, drawings of Michael Jackson promoting Monsanto and Rush Limbaugh surrounded by an aura of OxyContin, magic spell recipes in Old English, and tear sheets. A trail of rubber rats leads to the video at the back of the gallery, which shows Bag promoting Chase Bank, AOL, and thong pads along with clips of the Paris Hilton sex tape

== Grants and awards ==
In 1995, she was awarded a grant from the Foundation for Contemporary Arts Grants to Artists Award.

== Videography ==
- Untitled (Spring 94), 1994, (28 minutes)
- Untitled (Fall’95), 1995, (57 minutes)
- Artist's Mind, 1996, (22 minutes)
- His Girlfriend is a Robot, 1996, (16 minutes)
- Untitled (project for the Andy Warhol Museum), 1996, (22 minutes)
- Harriet Craig, 1998
- Le Cruel et Curieux Vie Du La Salmonellapod, 2000, with Ethan Kramer
- The Van, 2001
- Coven Services/Demo Reel, 2004

== Works cited ==
- Chris, Cynthia (March 2000). "Video Art: Stayin' Alive". Arterimage.
- Elein Feiss; Jeff Rian (Winter 2006). "Alex Bag's Girl World". Purple Prose.
- Frankel, David (October 2002). "American Fine Arts at P.H.A.G". Artforum.
- Frankel, David (October 2004). "TV, or not TV: David Frankel on Alex Bag". Artforum.
- Hainley, Bruce (March 1996). "All the rage: the art/fashion thing". Artforum.
- Hainley, Bruce (January 1996). "Alex Bag". Artforum.
- Kelsey, John (May 2004). "Alex Bag: Elizabeth Dee Gallery". Artforum.
- Kimmelman, Michael (June 28, 2002). "Art in Review; Alex Back -- 'Crackup'". The New York Times.
- Leffingwell, Edward (September 2004). "Alex Bag at Elizabeth Dee". Art in America.
- Rimanelli, David (December 2004). "13 Critics and Curators Look at the Year in Art". Artforum.
- Rimanelli, David (December 2001). "Best of 2001". Artforum.
- Rubinstein, Raphael (January 1996). "Alex Bag at 303". Art in America.
- Smith, Roberta (March 19, 2004). "Alex Bag". The New York Times.
