= BoND =

Architecture and interior design firm

BoND (Bureau of Noam & Daniel) is a New York City–based architecture and interior design firm founded in 2019 by architects and writers Noam Dvir and Daniel Rauchwerger.

== Background ==
Dvir graduated from Tel Aviv University with a bachelor's degree in architecture and from Harvard Graduate School with a Master of Architecture in urban design. They were both correspondents for the Israeli newspaper, Haaretz. Rauchwerger wrote as an arts correspondent and Dvir covered architecture.

Rauchwerger graduated from Bezalel Academy in Jerusalem with a bachelor's degree in architecture and a master's in design studies from Harvard Graduate School of Design.

== Work ==
Dvir and Rauchwerger formed BoND in 2019 after studying together at graduate school. Their project focus on commercial projects as well as experiential and workplace environments. Projects include spaces in New York City such as Company and David Lewis Gallery and high-end collaborative homes in East Hampton and Fire Island Pines; exhibitions in Cambridge, Massachusetts; and structures in Tel Aviv-Jaffa, Israel.
