= Nao Bustamante =

American artist

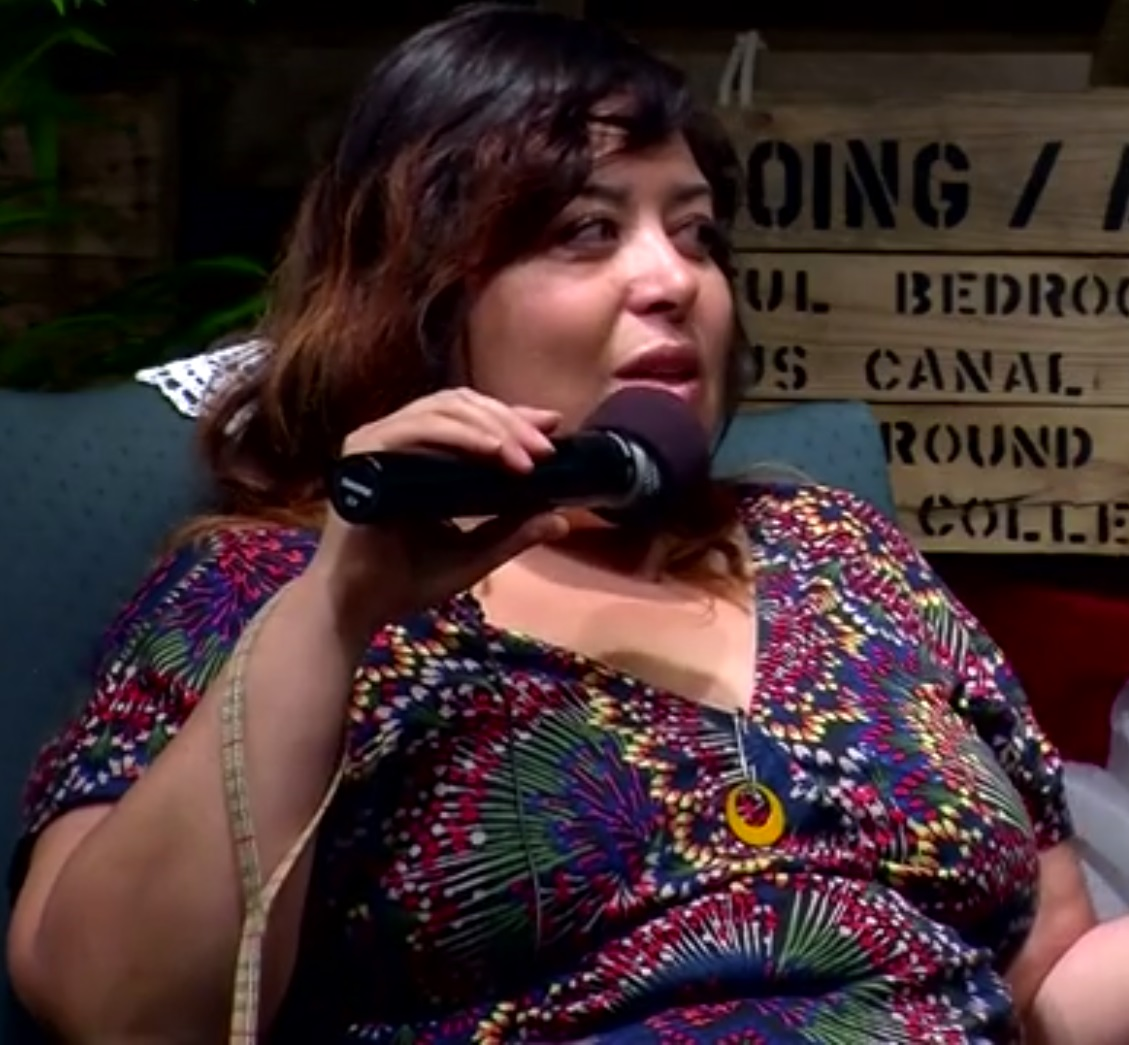
- Bustamante on Dale Radio by Dale Seever in 2012
- Born: September 3, 1969 (age 56); San Joaquin Valley, California, U.S.
- Education: San Francisco Art Institute, New Genres program and the Skowhegen School of Painting and Sculpture
- Occupations: Associate Professor and Vice Dean at the USC Roski School of Art and Design
- Known for: Art

Nao Bustamante (born September 3, 1969) is a Chicana interdisciplinary artist, writer, and educator from the San Joaquin Valley in California. Her artistic practice encompasses performance art, sculpture, installation, and video and explores issues of ethnicity, class, gender, performativity, and the body. She is a recipient of the 2023 Rome Prize.

== Early life and education ==
Bustamante was born in California. She first trained in postmodern dance before moving into the realm of performance in the mid-1980s. Active in the San Francisco between 1984 and 2001, Bustamante was once referred to as "the doyenne of the Bay Area’s underground cultural scene." She holds a BFA and MFA from the New Genres Program at the San Francisco Art Institute.

== Career ==
Bustamante has performed in galleries, museums, universities, and underground sites internationally, notably collaborating with performing artist and educator Coco Fusco and the experimental arts entity Osseus Labyrint.

She has received numerous awards and fellowships, including the prestigious Anonymous Was a Woman Award, New York Foundation for the Arts Fellowship, Lambent Fellowship, Chase Legacy Award in Film, Artist in Residence for the American Studies Association, CMAS-Benson Latin American Collection Research Fellowship, Queer Artist in Residence at the University of California, Riverside, and the University of California Institute for Mexico and the United States (UC MEXUS) Scholar in Residence Fellowship in preparation for a solo exhibition at Vincent Price Art Museum in Los Angeles.

She currently serves as Professor and Director of MFA Art Program at the University of Southern California Roski School of Art and Design in Los Angeles. She previously held the position of associate professor of New Media and Live Art at the Rensselaer Polytechnic Institute in Troy, New York.

Bustamante competed in the first season of Bravo's Work of Art: The Next Great Artist.

In 2024, Nao Bustamante's work was included in Xican-a.o.x. Body, an expansive group exhibition that has traveled from Cheech Marin Center for Chicano Art & Culture at the Riverside Art Museum to the Pérez Art Museum Miami.

== Notable works ==
- 1992 Indig/urrito: Performance commemorating the 500th anniversary of the Conquest of the Americas during which Bustamante "challenged the white men in the audience to go onstage to express their apologies for the years of oppression of indigenous peoples by eating a piece of a burrito that Bustamante had strapped on to her hips."
- 1992: Rosa Does Joan In arguably her most widely seen 'performance,' Nao created the character of "Rosa" the exhibitionist, to appear on the Joan Rivers Show. In this performance, Bustamante "becomes Rosa, a character or persona she devises for the purpose of guerrilla-style stunt performance." As Rosa, she tells Rivers about her sexual exploits while a psychiatrist, Dr. Georgia Witkin, determines how authentic she is as an exhibitionist.
- 1996-1998: STUFF! with Coco Fusco: Performance which explores sexual and spiritual tourism and its impact on Latin women, based on interviews with Cuban sex workers and child street vendors in Chiapas, Mexico.
- 1995: America the Beautiful: Extended reflection on the social forces that confine and contain feminine creativity, using her own body as a canvas.
- 1998: The Chain South: This was a satire piece focused on the corporate and pop-cultural relations between Mexico and the U.S. Bustamante portrays "Ronaldo McDonaldo." Director Miguel Calderon appears in the piece.
- 2001: Sparkler: This performance includes Nao posing vulnerably with a sparkler behind her in low light.
- 2003: Neopolitan: Video installation that includes a loop tape of the artist breaking out into spontaneous sobbing. The TV playing the loop is covered by a multicolored cozy that was crocheted by the artist, among other crocheted items. The installation, according to cultural critic José Esteban Muñoz, is "an illustration of the depressive position and its connection to minoritarian aesthetic and political practice."
- 2006 - 2007: Hero: Multimedia feature-length performance using video. Bustamanate transforms from princess to hag in the course of performance, incorporating video and storytelling.
- 2007: Wow and Now: A Celebration of Feminist and Queer Performance. Curated by Nao Bustamente, Karen Finley, and Jose Estaban Munoz, November 10, 2007, Joe's Pub, New York City.
- 2009: "Given Over to Want"
- 2010 Silver and Gold: performance at The Sundance Film Festival that began with Bustamante dressed in a beekeepers outfit frolicking through a green forest. The film then progresses, and "things start to happen [...] that can't be described in a family newspaper." According to Bustamante the film was a homage to "Maria Montez, the 1940s Dominican film star, and muse and legendary filmmaker, Jack Smith."
- 2013 Tableau: Short fictional film about an experimental filmmaker, JT, as he attempts to complete his apocalyptic film while being interrupted by his tween neighbor. The film premiered at Outfest LA Film Festival. The film can be viewed online.
- 2015 Soldadera: Exhibition at the Vincent Price Art Museum. Features a documentary film of Bustamante's journey to Guadalaraja to meet 127-year old Soldadera Leandra Becerra Lumbreras, at the time the last survivor of the Mexican revolution. Bustamante also produced a bullet-proof dress titled "Tierra y Libertad - Kevlar 2945" and rebozo inspired by an image of a group of armed women dressed in Edwardian gowns. The dress is worn in a performance captured in the video "Test Shoot" where Bustamante wears the dress as she is fired at with a rifle.
- 2023 Brown Disco: a glowing uncanny brown disco ball that Bustamante constructed especially OCDChinatown. Text provided for the work as follows: "Escape your professional obligations and post-covid anxiety to slow your heart rate in Bustamante’s laid-back LA answer to the Bushwick day rave."
