= Tanea Richardson =

American artist

Tanea Richardson is an American artist known for her assemblages and sculptures. Richardson has exhibited her work at the Studio Museum in Harlem, EFA Project Space of the Elizabeth Foundation for the Arts, and at the Museum of Contemporary African Diasporan Arts (MoCADA), in Brooklyn, New York.

Richardson employs everyday materials like telecommunication wires and cables to bind fabric, the work a comment on traditional women’s labor and society's understanding of certain bodies through textiles and language. Roberta Smith of the New York Times described her wall pieces at the Studio Museum in Harlem in 2008, "Initially they seem overly familiar, but they gradually become extremely particular and rather sinister."

A graduate of the Ryman Arts program in Los Angeles and Stanford University, she attended Yale University’s School of Art from 2005.
