= Tiona Nekkia McClodden =

American artist

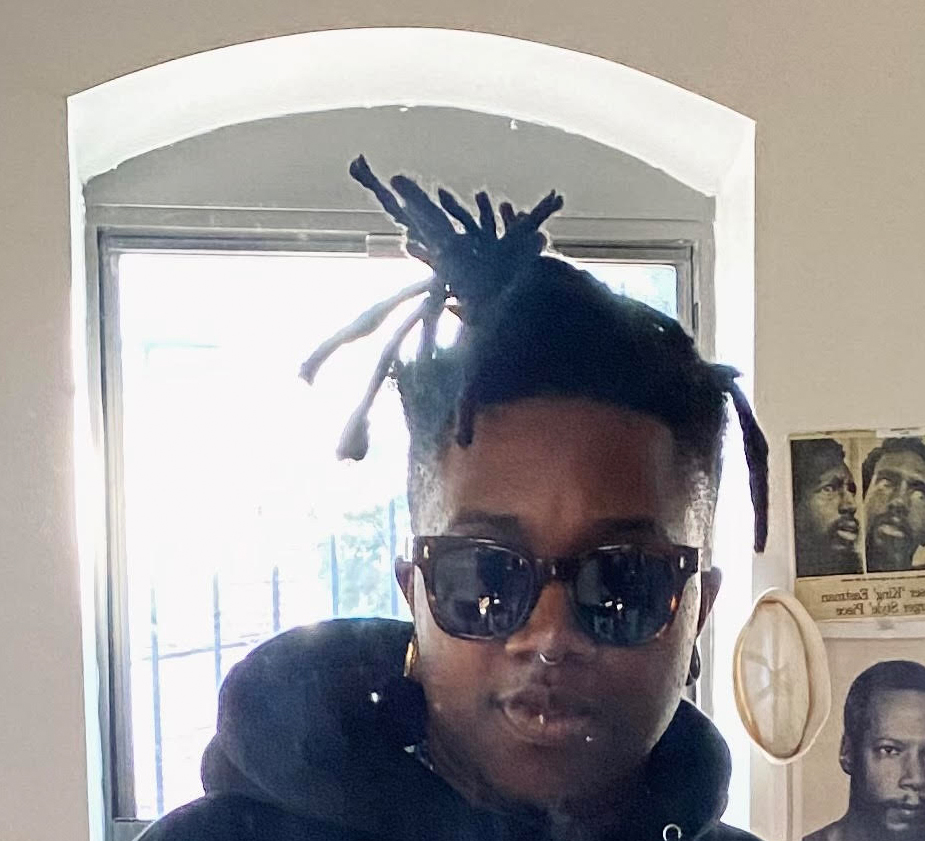
- McClodden in her studio, 2023
- Born: July 2, 1981 (age 45); Blytheville, Arkansas, U.S.
- Website: www.tionam.com

Tiona Nekkia McClodden (July 2, 1981, Blytheville, Arkansas) is an interdisciplinary research-based conceptual artist, filmmaker and curator based in Philadelphia, Pennsylvania.

== Early life ==
McClodden was born in Blytheville, Arkansas, in 1981. She went to Clark Atlanta University, majoring in film and psychology. Although she did not graduate from Spelman College, McClodden continued extracurricular education in film there.

== Career and works ==
McClodden's work explores concepts of gender, sexuality and race, centering a black, queer lineage. She produces her work through her film and media company Harriet's Gun, which she has said is a reference to Harriet Tubman.

She has created bodies of work in dedication to underrepresented African-American writers and musicians such as Langston Hughes and Florence B. Price or Essex Hemphill, Brad Johnson and Julius Eastman, who made work in the 1980s during the AIDS crisis in the US.

Her work was shown at the Institute of Contemporary Art in Philadelphia as part of the Speech/Acts exhibit in 2017.

McClodden has been the recipient of several notable awards. She was the fifth recipient of the Keith Haring Fellowship in Art and Activism at the Center for Curatorial Studies and the Human Rights Project at Bard College. In 2018, she was a Magnum Foundation Fund grantee. In 2017 McClodden won the Louis Comfort Tiffany Foundation Award. She was a 2016 Pew Fellow and received a grant from Pew in 2018.

McClodden showed in the 2019 Whitney Biennial, curated by Rujeko Hockley and Jane Panetta. McClodden's exhibit was a three-hour-long, six-screen film documenting a religious pilgrimage she took to Nigeria, running on a loop. In March 2020, it was announced that McClodden would be included in Prospect.5 in New Orleans, LA, curated by Naima J. Keith and Diana Nawi.

McClodden is the founder of Conceptual Fade, a combination gallery and library space in Philadelphia, PA. McClodden cites the inspiration for the space as the Pyramid Club as well as micro jazz bars in Japan. Conceptual Fade's library, is also McClodden's personal library, with a focus on Black artists and available to the public for research.

=== The Brad Johnson Tape ===
Inspired by a poem by Johnson published in Other Countries: Black Gay Voices, McClodden created a 10-scene performance piece on VHS tape.

=== A Recollection. + Predicated ===
A Recollection. + Predicated within Julius Eastman: That Which is Fundamental was curated by McClodden at The Kitchen in New York City. It centered three years of research around Eastman (in collaboration with Julius Eastman Estate), an internationally lauded minimalist composer who died homeless just shy of fifty years old. This exhibition included an installation of artwork by Carolyn Lazard, Sondra Perry, Chloe Bass, and Texas Isaiah and musical performances of Eastman's work.

=== CLUB ===
McClodden's piece, CLUB, took place in 2018 at the Performance Space New York, in a space where Keith Haring first exhibited. It explored the liminality of nightclubs, where visitors might leave their everyday persona outside and interact with different social boundaries.

== Exhibitions ==
=== Solo exhibitions ===
- 2014: Be Alarmed: The Black Americana Epic, Movement I - The Visions, Esther Klein Art Gallery - Philadelphia, PA
- 2016: Dreaming of KIN - Be Alarmed: The Black Americana Epic, Movement I - The Visions, Museum of Contemporary African Diasporan Arts, Brooklyn, NY
- 2017: KILO Iba Se 99 Exposition Gemeente Amsterdam, Netherlands
- 2018: CLUB, Performance Space, New York, NY
- 2019: Hold on, let me take the safety off, COMPANY Gallery, New York, NY
- 2021: Be Alarmed: The Black Americana Epic, Movement III - The Triple Deities, Globe Dye Works, Philadelphia, PA
- 2021: PLAY ME HOME, Prospect New Orleans, New Orleans, LA
- 2022: MASK | CONCEAL | CARRY, 52 Walker, New York, NY
- 2023: THE POETICS OF BEAUTY WILL INEVITABLY RESORT TO THE MOST BASE PLEADINGS AND OTHER WILES IN ORDER TO SECURE ITS RELEASE, KunsthalleBasel, Basel, Switzerland

== Writing ==
- "Texas Isaiah" Artforum, Summer 2018.
- "My Existential Limits to the Rectification of Past Wrongs, Or, So If You See Me Crying, It’s Just a Sign That I’m Still Alive", Triple Canopy, April 25, 2019
- "Six Movements for Shango, Xangô, Changó, Ṣàngó," Love and Ethnology: the Colonial Dialectic of Sensitivity (after Hubert Fichte), eds. Diedrich Diedrichsen and Anselm Franke, Haus der Kulturen der Welt, 2019
- "The Brad Johnson Tape, X - On Subjugation, 2017" Souls Journal, Volume 21, 2020
- "A Questionnaire on Decolonization" (Contributor), OCTOBER Journal, December 1, 2020
- "Shawné Michaelain Holloway and Tiona Nekkia McClodden," Black Futures, eds. Jenna Wortham and Kimberly Drew, Random House Publishing Group, 2021
