= Ambera Wellmann =

Canadian artist (born 1982)

Ambera Wellmann (born 1982 in Lunenburg, Nova Scotia) is a Canadian painter who depicts human bodies in between play and violence, movement and dissolution. She has exhibited internationally at venues including Lulu in Mexico City, the 16th Istanbul Biennale in 2019, MoMA Warsaw, and others. Wellmann is based between Mexico City, Berlin, and New York.

== Artistic background ==
Wellmann's earlier paintings were inspired by various personal experiences of either emotional or erotic encounters. Her figurative approach often showed the horizontal domain of the bed against amorphous bodies pushing against the boundary of social binaries.

Wellmann approaches their paintings with "painterly catachresis" which she describes as a process to deliberately use a word, image, or pictorial representation in a way that is not correct. This manifests through irrational pictorial space and the depiction of an indeterminate number of bodies, genders, species, all without any predetermined visual hierarchy.

Wellmann is known for her nested and collage-like painting technique that portrays twisted and abstracted human bodies and animal-like figurines. These techniques are shared by painters Jamian Juliano-Villani and Gregory Edwards.

In December 2023, it was announced that Wellmann is now jointly represented by Hauser & Wirth and Company Gallery.

== Exhibition history ==
In 2020, Wellmann showed at Company gallery in New York City and Kraupa-Tuskany Zeidler in Berlin, Germany. For the paintings exhibited at these two shows, poet Jessica Caroline recalls a conceptual likeness to writers like Georges Bataille, Simone Weil, William Blake, or Julia Kristeva and painters like Francis Bacon, Frida Kahlo, and nineteenth-century Romantic painting. Curator Sonja-Maria Borstner notes that the artist's liquid brushstrokes generate a peculiar arena for non-binary identities whose "contested terrain" is constantly under litigation and boundary passing.

UnTurning, Wellmann's first institutional European show opened at the MAC in Belfast in fall of 2021.

In 2021, Wellmann was part of the New Museum Triennial "Soft Water Hard Stone" in New York, NY. The exhibition was curated by Jamillah James and Margot Norton.
