= Mika Tajima =

- Born: 1975 (age 50–51); Los Angeles, California
- Education: Bryn Mawr College, Columbia University School of the Arts
- Website: http://mikatajima.com/

Mika Tajima (born 1975 in Los Angeles, California) is a New York-based artist who employs sculpture, painting, media installation, and performance in her conceptual practice.

== Education ==
Tajima earned a Bachelor of Arts degree in Fine Arts and East Asian Studies from Bryn Mawr College in 1997, and a Master of Fine Arts graduate degree from the Columbia University School of the Arts in 2003. That year she was also a Post-Graduate Apprentice at The Fabric Workshop and Museum in Philadelphia.

== Work ==
Tajima's practice materializes techniques developed to shape the physicality, productivity, and desires of the human body. Her work relates performance, control, and freedom to the embodied experience of architectonic and computational life.

Her early installations and collaborative work explored performance in relation to the built environment. Using the music recording studio, film production set, industrial factory, data centers, and office work environment as production sites, Tajima examined how these spaces shape our activities and bodies. In each project, the performing subject confronts determined situations and seeks new possibilities through modes of non-performance and autonomy.

Her other work draws on technologies used to control and affect the human body and mind. This includes techniques that shape psychological desires and our experience of space and time. “From architectural systems to ergonomic design to psychographic data, her works operate in the space between the transient and the tangible, and highlight the complex networks of power and submission that we experience in relationship to our physical bodies and virtual selves.”

Through a residency at the Fabric Workshop, Tajima developed her Negative Entropy woven portrait series in which she focused on mechanical textile production, in particular the development of the Jacquard loom, as a technology linked to these early modes of industry, but also one that developed into our current age of computing and information management. Meridian (2016), was developed using sentiment analysis and prediction technology, where the light sculpture responds in real time to the collective mood of a population expressed on live Twitter feeds from a particular geographic region, such as Istanbul. Her exhibitions include Disassociate (2007), The Double (2008), and Negative Entropy (2014).

== Collaboration ==
In 2003, she co-founded New Humans, a collaborative group including then-artists Eric Tsai and her now-husband Howie Chen to make works involving sound, installation, and performance actions. "New Humans" is a moniker for Tajima's projects with other musicians, artists and designers. Collaborators for New Humans performances and projects include Vito Acconci, Charles Atlas, Judith Butler, John Smith and C. Spencer Yeh, among others.

== Awards ==
In 2007 she received an Artadia Award.
