= Paula Parisot =

Brazilian writer, illustrator and artist

- Born: December 28, 1978 (age 47); Rio de Janeiro, Brazil
- Education: Pontifical Catholic University of Rio de Janeiro; The New School
- Occupations: Visual Artist, Writer
- Writing career
- Genres: Novel, short stories
- Notable work: A dama da solidão (The Lady of Solitude)
- Notable awards: Jabuti Award, Finalist

Paula Parisot (born 1978) is a Brazilian artist and writer.

== Life ==
Parisot was born in Rio de Janeiro and she studied Industrial Design at the Pontifical Catholic University of Rio de Janeiro before moving to The New School in New York City, where she earned a Master's Degree in Fine Arts.

Paula Parisot's first book, A dama da solidão (2007), was a finalist in the short fiction category for the Jabuti Award, Brazil's most prestigious literary award. Her second novel, Gonzos e parafusoswas (2010) inspired a performance that lasted for seven consecutive days in which Parisot confined herself to a room 3 meters by 4 meters, which was a reproduction of the sanatorium at the end of the novel. Parisot's third book, Partir (2013), includes original drawings by Parisot and led to a series of new performances in Guadalajara, Rio de Janeiro, and São Paulo. In 2015, Parisot was featured in the Brazil imprint of Harper's Bazaar.

The first translation of Parisot's work into English will be published by Dalkey Archive Press in 2016, under the title Lady of Solitude. This is the book that took her to the finals of the Jabuti Award in 2007.

Parisot is the co-creator and co-screenwriter, with Jessica Mitrani of the TV series A Crucigramista, channel ARTE1 - BRAZIL . With the title “America Invertida (America Inverted), the first session uses the language and the logic of crossword puzzles to draw a panorama of art and culture in Latin America.

Parisot has done a series of performances related to her literary work and was hailed by Marina Abramovic who said: "Original and inventive, Paula Parisot has found a new way to present her books by adding performative elements. In this way she is that the forefront of opening new possibilities for writers, and artists in general. To find different ways of expression, she boldly crossed the borders between writing and performance.”

Parisot has participated on Bienal do Mercosul (2020) e da BienalSur (2021).

Currently (2023) she lives between Buenos Aires and São Paulo with her family.

== Works ==
- A dama da solidão, 2007 (Trans. The Lady of Solitude, 2016. Dalkey Archive Press)
- Gonzos e parafusos, 2010
- Partir, 2013
- La invención de La Realidad, 2013
- Muyerengué (editorial Guadal - El gato hojalata) children's book, 2024

== TV ==
- A crucigramista - America Invertida, 2018 (ARTE1)
- A crucigramista - America Feminizada, 2019 (ARTE1)

== Biennials ==
- 2020 Bienal do Mercosul
- 2021 Bienal Sur
