= Dino Boffo =

Italian journalist

- Born: 19 August 1952 (age 74); Fonte, Veneto
- Occupation: Journalist

Dino Boffo (born 19 August 1952) is an Italian journalist. From 1994 to 2009, he was editor of the newspaper Avvenire, and from, 2010 to 2014 director of the television network TV2000.
