= Yve Laris Cohen =

American artist

Yve Laris Cohen is a contemporary American artist born in San Diego, California who currently lives and works in Brooklyn, New York. Laris Cohen's influences range from classical ballet to the ways in which the contemporary visual art world addresses the body as a medium.

Yve Laris Cohen graduated from the Columbia University School of the Arts with an MFA in Visual Arts in 2011 and received a BA in Dance & Performance Studies/Art Practice from the University of California Berkeley in 2008. He received the Foundation for Contemporary Arts Grants to Artists award (2016).

== Themes ==
Laris Cohen's practice is informed by ballet and the visual art world's contemporary fascination with the Judson Dance Theater. Laris Cohen has played with the visibility and invisibility of transgender representation in his work.

== Select exhibitions ==
- 2014 Whitney Biennial, Whitney Museum of American Art, New York.
- “Seth” at the Whitney Museum of American Art in conjunction with “Maintenance Required,” at the Kitchen, 2013.
- Hessel Museum of Art, Spring 2013.
- Movement Research. March, 2013. (2010-2012 Artist in Residence)
- “Coda” at the show, “You never look at me from the place from which I see you.” Sculpture Center. Spring 2012.
- “A Gay Bar Called Everywhere” The Kitchen. Group show. May 2011.
