= Puppies Puppies =

American Contemporary artist

- Born: 1989 (age 36–37); Dallas, Texas, U.S.
- Known for: conceptual art, performance art

Jade Kuriki-Olivo (born 1989), known by the pseudonym Puppies Puppies, is a contemporary artist known primarily for her conceptual works of sculpture, installation, and performance art. Her practice mobilizes readymade objects and characters from popular culture while questioning the authority of various institutional practices in the medical field, the university, and museum space. Her 2017 work Liberté (Liberty), was the first and only work of performance art to be acquired by the Whitney Museum of American Art for its permanent collection.

== Early life and education ==
Puppies Puppies grew up outside of Dallas, Texas. Her mother is Japanese and her father is Puerto Rican. She attended the School of The Art Institute of Chicago, as well as Yale University's MFA program. She became interested in performance as an art form in high school when she dressed up as her school's mascot. In 2010, the artist had a life-threatening brain tumor, which was successfully removed.

== Work ==
The artist is known for working in a wide range of media and materials, including blood, The Lord of the Rings and Harry Potter fan art, crab carapaces, Swiffers and Minions paraphernalia, many of these earlier works shown at Sam Lipp's and Luis Miguel Bendaña's Tribeca gallery, Queer Thoughts. her 2015 exhibition HorseshoeCrabs HorseshoeCrabs at the Freddy Gallery, Baltimore displayed various artistic interpretations of the horseshoe crab, an arthropod whose blood is often drained for use in pharmaceutical manufacturing.

In 2016 she participated in the Berlin Biennale, presenting a new video each day of the biennale.

The following year, her work Liberté (Liberty) was included in the Whitney Biennial. The piece involved a performer wearing a green gown along with a crown standing on an outdoor terrace of the Whitney Museum; simultaneously, the Whitney's gift shop sold $5 liberty crowns to visitors. The work is the only piece of performance art in the Whitney permanent collection.

In 2019, Interview Magazine published a conversation between Laura Albert and Puppies Puppies, where the artist publicly revealed her identity for the first time, coming out as a "Latinx transgender woman." Her 2019 solo show at Remai Modern in Saskatoon, Saskatchewan, engaged blood as a subject. The exhibition displayed a bag of the artist's own blood, as well as providing on-site HIV testing and blood donation services to visitors. Her work focuses on frequent collaboration, especially with other queer and trans artists such as Bri Williams and Elliot Reed.

Kuriki Olivo routinely attends the Stonewall Protests. Organized by Qween Jean and Joela Rivera, who hold weekly demonstrations for the past since the wake of the murder of George Floyd, the protests include groups like Riders4Rights and Musicians United NYC.

Her latest solo institutional show took place in 2024 at New Museum in New York City and was called "Nothing New." Puppies Puppies took over the gallery lobby. She divided the space into three rooms: a serene garden in the front, a cozy bedroom in the center, and a back room filled with thriving marijuana plants behind the galleries glass wall. At random intervals, the glass barrier that separates her from the audience goes white and turns opaque. Vibrant green items have been placed in the gallery and the museum's café to correspond with the show.

As the second Trump Administration increasingly targeted transgender artists and subject matter for censorship, Puppies Puppies told The New Yorker that her work had been increasingly removed and excluded by private institutions unwilling to risk upsetting their donors by featuring a trans artist - with one notable example being when a work was moved out of an unnamed major museum and into an off-site popup.
