= Luke O'Halloran =

Painter

Luke Patrick O'Halloran (born 1991 in Thousand Oaks, California) is a painter living and working in Brooklyn, New York. He is known for his paintings and drawings of forever spinning wheels, detailed portraits of slot machines in motion.

== Career ==
Luke O'Halloran was born in California and received his BFA from the University of Colorado Boulder in 2014. He lived in Colorado for seven years before moving to New York, where he worked out of his Brooklyn apartment until 2022. O'Halloran typically paints and draws various subjects in motion including slot machines and casino games, bowling balls, fruits falling from baskets, and free falling cats. Of the cats, O'Halloran notes that felines have both a nonlethal terminal velocity and a righting reflex, adaptations he hopes humans can strive for one day. He is also known for the use of playing cards as a subject, painting them falling through the air, being built into houses of cards, or as tools for magicians' tricks. Influences include early Jasper Johns's number paintings and Vija Celmins. He has shown at galleries including Almioe Rech, OCDChinatown, Gavlak Gallery, and Kapp Kapp. In 2021, his work was shown alongside Sarah Charlesworth's at the Winter Street Gallery in Martha's Vineyard.
