= Texas Isaiah =

American photographer and artist

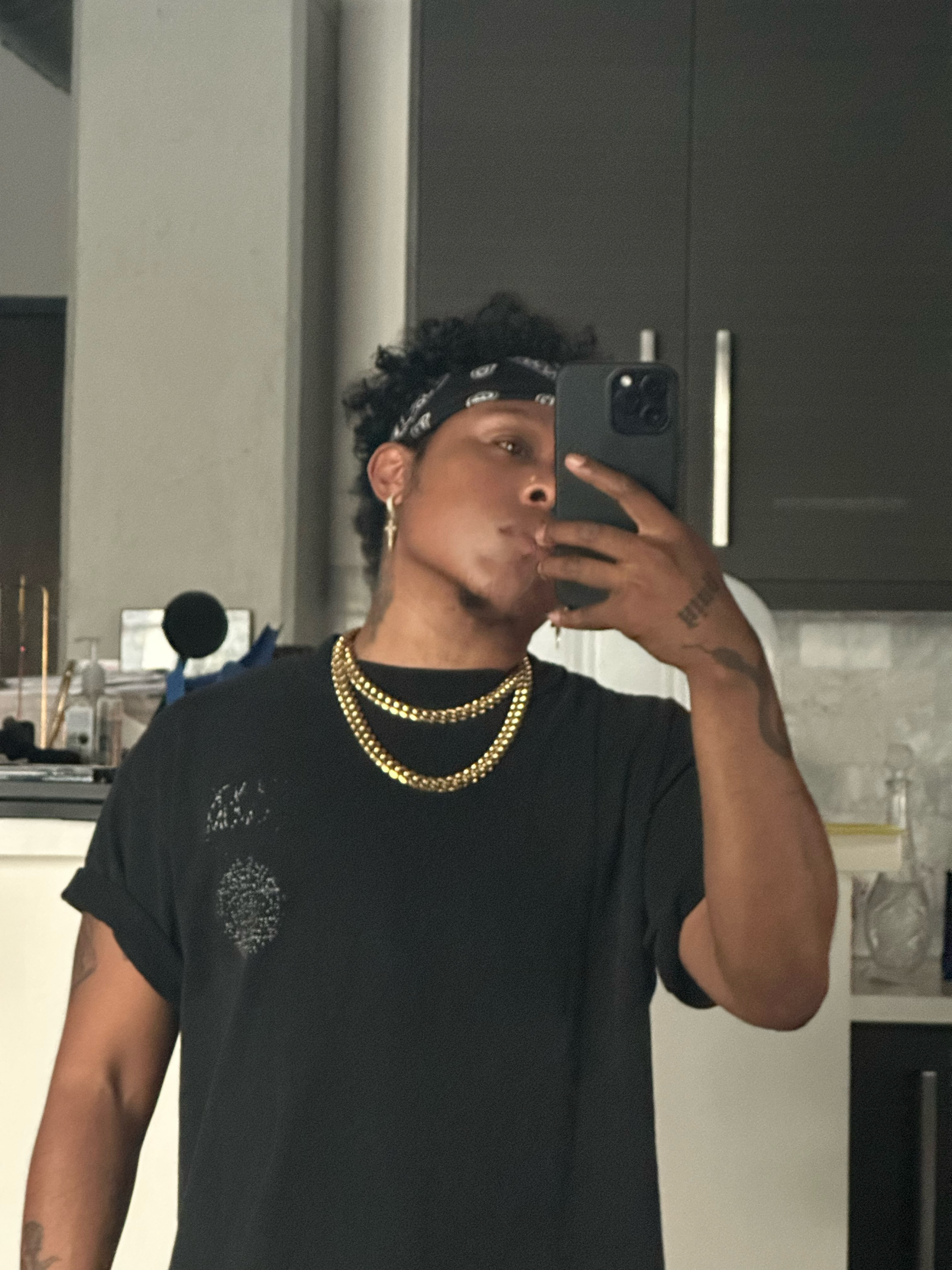
- Born: Brooklyn, New York
- Occupation: Visual Narrator / Photographer
- Website: www.texasisaiah.com

Texas Isaiah is a first-generation Black Indigenous American photographer and contemporary artist born in Brooklyn, New York. He is currently based in Los Angeles, California. His family is from Guyana, Venezuela, and Barbados. He is the 2019 recipient of the Getty Images: Where We Stand Creative Bursary grant. In 2017, Texas Isaiah was featured in TIME as one of the top 12 African American photographers you should follow right now. Texas Isaiah is currently a 2020–21 artist in residence at the Studio Museum in Harlem.

== Life and work ==
Texas Isaiah was born in the East New York neighborhood of Brooklyn, New York. As a child, he attended Catholic school. He attended college for a short time and dropped out after discovering that formal education wasn't a proper fitting. He is an autodidact. The intimate works he creates center the possibilities that can emerge by inviting individuals to participate in the photographic process. He is attempting to shift the power dynamics rooted in photography to display different ways of accessing support in one's own body.

In 2020, he was the first trans photographer to photograph a cover for any Vogue magazine edition. A variety of covers were issued for British Vogue's September issue with Isaiah photographing: Jesse Williams, Patrisse Cullors-Brignac, Janaya Khan, and Janet Mock.

He is one of the 2018 grant recipients of Art Matters, a 2019 recipient of the Getty Images: Where We Stand Creative Bursary grant, a 2020-21 artist in residence at The Studio Museum in Harlem, a 2020 Clio Awards Silver winner for visual curation on Being Seen Podcast, and a finalist for the 2022 Artadia Los Angeles Award.

Isaiah's work has been exhibited at Fotografiska New York, Aperture Foundation Gallery (NYC), Charlie James Gallery (LA), Studio Museum in Harlem (NYC), Residency (LA), Hammer Museum (LA), and The Kitchen (NYC). His work is currently part of three touring exhibitions: The New Black Vanguard: Photography Between Art and Fashion at the Saatchi Gallery in London, UK, As We Rise: Photography from the Black Atlantic at The Polygon Gallery in North Vancouver, BC, and The Culture: Hip Hop & Contemporary Art in the 21st Century at the Baltimore Museum of Art.
