= Carlos Motta (artist) =

Colombian photographer (born 1978)

- Born: 1978 (age 47–48); Bogotá, Colombia
- Education: School of Visual Arts; Bard College
- Known for: Film; photography; sculpture

Carlos Motta (born 1978) is a Colombian-born, New York-based artist. Motta has an interdisciplinary practice making work in film, photography and sculpture. Motta's practice challenges dominant ideas about sexuality and gender using a myriad of archival material, art historical references, and the body.

== Early life and education ==
Motta was born and raised in Bogotá, Colombia. He received a BFA from The School of Visual Arts in 2001 and an MFA from Bard College in 2003. Motta attended the Independent Study Program at the Whitney Museum of American Art during the 2005-06 academic year.

== Work ==
In 2008, Motta had his first show in Philadelphia at the Institute of Contemporary Art. Titled Carlos Motta: The Good Life, the large-scale documentary project, which began in 2005, explored the history and effects of US interventionist policies in Latin America. More than 300 interviews were conducted between the artist and civilians in 12 different Latin American cities.

In 2009, Motta had his first a solo exhibition in New York at MoMA PS1, New York, titled On-site 1: Carlos Motta. The exhibition included two newspapers and black vinyl mural and investigated the School of the Americas (SOA)-a Cold War institution sponsored by the U.S. government to train Latin American soldiers in counterinsurgency tactics and various military tactics.

One year later, Motta showed at the Museo de Arte del Banco de la República in Bogotá.

In 2012, the artist began working on the database documentary wewhofeeldifferently.info as part of the New Museum's Museum as Hub program. The culmination of the project, titled We Who Feel Differently, approached and re-negotiated the idea of sexual and gender "difference" in terms of greater equality. The project included an exhibition, several public events, and symposium with guest speakers.

At The Tanks in 2013, Motta organized the symposium Gender Talents: A Special Address which included artists and activists like Esben Esther Pirelli Benestad, Giuseppe Campuzano, J. Jack Halberstam, Beatriz Preciado, Dean Spade, Wu Tsang & Safra Project, Del LaGrace Volcano and more.

Motta has frequently exhibited with Galerie Vermelho, São Paulo, Brazil, and P.P.O.W. Gallery, New York, New York.

A monograph of Motta's work will be published in early 2020 by SKIRA. The book will feature essays by Hendrik Folkerts, Andrea Giunta, Miguel A. López, and Agustín Pérez Rubio.

In 2022, Motta had a two-person exhibition alongside Tiamat Legion Medusa at OCDChinatown. Titled When I Leave This World, the exhibition featured a 26-minute two-channel video installation that focused on the life and work of performance and body-modification artist Tiamat Legion Medusa.

== Personal life ==
Motta's partner is the writer John Arthur Peetz, the Managing Editor of Movement Research, one of the world’s leading laboratories for dance and movement-based forms.

== Selected solo exhibitions ==
- Carlos Motta: We The Enemy, Mary Porter Sesnon Gallery, University of California Santa Cruz, 2020
- Carlos Motta: We Got Each Other’s Back, Portland Institute of Contemporary Art (PICA), 2020
- Carlos Motta: Billboard from “50 State Initiative”, Judd Foundation, New York, in collaboration with For Freedoms, 2020
- Dialogues: David Wojnarowicz and Carlos Motta, P.P.O.W Gallery at ARCO, Madrid, 2019
- Carlos Motta: Conatus, P.P.O.W Gallery, New York, 2019
- Carlos Motta, Galeria Vermelho, São Paulo, 2019
- Carlos Motta: Deseos, Galeria Vermelho, São Paulo, 2018
- Carlos Motta: The Psalms, Discoveries, Art Basel Hong Kong with Mor Charpentier Galerie, Paris, 2018
- Carlos Motta: Petrificado, CDAN— Centro de Arte y Naturaleza, Fundación Beulas, Huesca, 2018
- Carlos Motta. Formas de libertad, Centro Cultural Matucana 100, Santiago de Chile, 2018
- Carlos Motta: L’oeuvre du Diable, Mor Charpentier Galerie, Paris, 2018
- Carlos Motta: Corpo Fechado, Galeria Avenida da Índia (EGEAC), Lisbon, 2018
- Carlos Motta. Formas de libertad, Museo de Arte Moderno de Medellín (MAMM), 2017
- Carlos Motta: Lágrimas, Museo de Arte de la Universidad Nacional at the Claustro de San Agustín, Bogotá, 2017
- The SPIT! Manifesto (with SPIT! (Carlos Motta, John Arthur Peetz and Carlos Maria Romero)), Frieze Projects, London, 2017
- Carlos Motta: The Crossing, Stedelijk Museum, Amsterdam, 2017
- Carlos Motta: Desviaciones, Centro Cultural Gabriel García Márquez / Colombian Embassy in Spain, Madrid in collaboration with Mor Charpentier Galerie, Paris, 2017
- Beloved Martina..., Mercer Union, Toronto, 2016
- Deviations, P.P.O.W Gallery, New York, 2016
- Histories for the Future, Pérez Art Museum (PAMM), Miami, 2016
- Desires, Hordaland Kunssenter, Bergen, 2016
- For Democracy There Must Be Love, Röda Sten Konsthall, Gothenburg, 2015
- Désirs, Mor.Charpentier Galerie, Paris, 2015
- Patriots, Citizens, Lovers…, PinchukArtCentre, Kyiv, 2015
- Gender Talents (in the context of Charming for the Revolution: A Congress for Gender Talents and Wildness), The Tanks, Tate Modern, London (co-presented with Electra), 2013
- The Movers (with Matthias Sperling), The Tanks, Tate Modern, London, 2013
- ritual of queer rituals (with AA Bronson), Witte de With, Rotterdam, 2013
- Museum as Hub: Carlos Motta: We Who Feel Differently, New Museum, New York, 2012
- The Immigrant Files: Democracy Is Not Dead, It Just Smells Funny, Konsthall C, Stockholm, Sweden, Baltic Art Center (BAC), Visby, Swede, 2009
