= Jonathan Lyndon Chase =

American visual artist (born 1989)

- Born: 1989 (age 36–37); Philadelphia, Pennsylvania, United States
- Education: University of the Arts, Pennsylvania Academy of the Fine Arts (MFA)
- Occupation: Visual artist
- Known for: Painting

Jonathan Lyndon Chase (born 1989) is an American visual artist, known for painting. Chase's paintings and drawings focus primarily on queer black bodies in mundane, everyday spaces. Chase lives in Philadelphia, Pennsylvania.

== Early life and education ==
Chase was born in 1989, in Philadelphia, Pennsylvania. They identify as queer, non-binary (they/them) and Black.

Chase graduated from the University of the Arts in Philadelphia, in 2013, and received a MFA degree in 2016 from the Pennsylvania Academy of the Fine Arts in Philadelphia.

== Work ==
Chase's practice is a process of traditional and digital collage, drawing, photography, poetry, archiving, and research.

Chases's figurative paintings stand stylistically beside peers Louis Fratino, Nicole Eisenman, and Carroll Dunham, and equally reference the erotic woodblock prints of Ukiyo-e. Artist and curator Tiona Nekkia McClodden writes of Chase's paintings, "The figures mirror each other, touch each other ... reach through each other. They are layered, they are tender and have a necessary roughness. Lovemaking, or rather loving oneself is like this. There is the way he allows a reversed negative x-ray transparency to look through certain parts of the body."

Art critic Holland Cotter notes of the exhibition, "Quiet Storm" — which refers to a genre of mellow, primarily African-American pop music — there is nothing the least quiet about Mr. Chase's exuberant brushwork, or his images of glittered-splashed flesh and gay coupledom." Writer Miss Rosen says of Chase, "Imagine the love child of Missy Elliott and Romare Bearden, raised by Ren & Stimpy, and embracing the intimacies of James Baldwin's Giovanni's Room ... and you can begin to grasp the intricate complexities and exquisite nuances of African-American artist Jonathan Lyndon Chase."

Chase notes artists Romare Bearden, Alison Saar, Marlon Riggs, Robert Colescott, Alice Neel, and Kerry James Marshall as key inspirations as well as culture and fashion from the 1980s and 1990s, Afrofuturism, and science-fiction in relationship to black and queer narratives.

== Exhibitions ==
=== Solo exhibitions ===
- 2013, Double Identity, University of the Arts, Philadelphia, Pennsylvania
- 2015, Arenas, Tenderness, and Gloom, Gallery 817, University of the Arts, Philadelphia, Pennsylvania
- 2016, Rosebud, Lord Ludd, Philadelphia, Pennsylvania
- 2016, Sweet and Hard, Thierry Goldberg Gallery, New York City, New York
- 2018, Sheets, Kohn Gallery, Los Angeles, California
- 2018, Quiet Storm, Company Gallery, New York City, New York

=== Group exhibitions ===
- Punch, curated by Nina Chanel Abney, Deitch Projects, New York, NY, 2018
- Reclamation! Pan-African Works from the Beth Rudin DeWoody Collection, The Taubman, 2018
- Museum of Art, Roanoke, VA, 2018
- Engender, curated by Joshua Friedman, Kohn Gallery, Los Angeles, CA, 2017
- "NUDE"V1, Gallery Denmark, Copenhagen, 2017
- Black Masculinity, PafA Historic Landmark Building, 2017
- Life and Living, Deli Gallery, Long Island City, NY, 2017
- Discovery, Art Brussels, Belgium, 2017
- Chase | Frantino | Lee, Thierry Goldberg Gallery, New York, NY, 2017
- Tie his hands gently, ROMEO Gallery, New York, NY, 2016
- Person, Place or Thing, Fleisher/Ollman Gallery, Philadelphia, PA, 2016

== Bibliography ==
- Sheets (Kohn Gallery, 2018) OCLC 1055562132
- Quiet storm (Capricious, 2018) OCLC
- Young Gifted and Black- A New Generation of Artist- Antwaun Sargent (D.A.P, 2020)

== Talks ==
- Painting and Representation with Tim Doud and Louis Fratino at the National Gallery of Art, Washington, D.C., October 21, 2018
