= White Columns =

Non-profit gallery in New York City

- Former name: 112 Workshop/112 Greene Street (1970-1979)
- Established: 1970
- Location: New York City, United States
- Coordinates: 40°44′20″N 74°0′31″W
- Type: Non-profit alternative art space
- Founders: Jeffrey Lew, Gordon Matta-Clark
- Director: Matthew Higgs (current)
- Website: whitecolumns.org

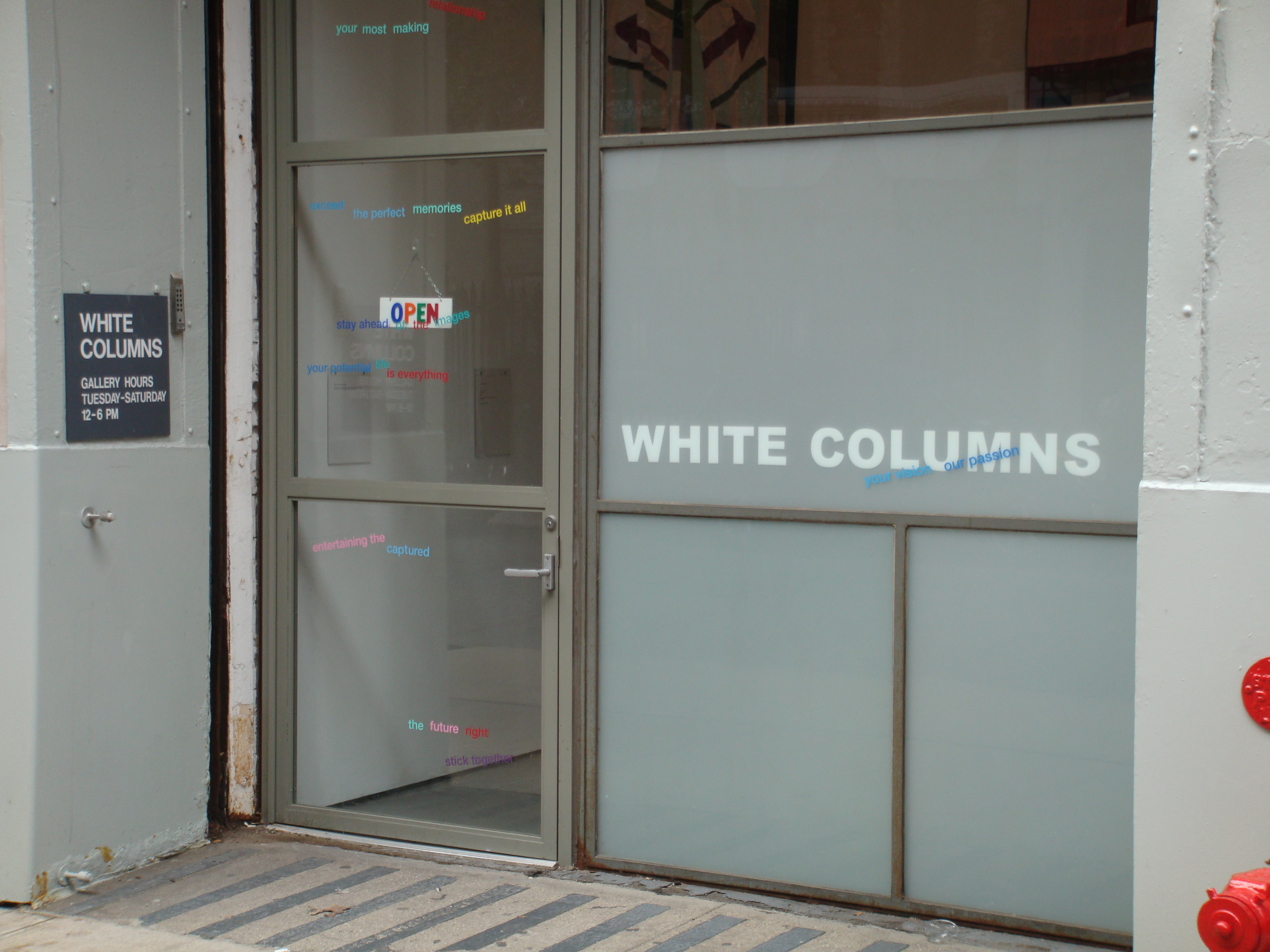
Previous location of White Columns, at 320 West 13th Street, New York City.

White Columns is New York City's oldest alternative non-profit art space. White Columns is known as a showcase for up-and-coming artists, and is primarily devoted to emerging artists who are not affiliated with galleries. All work submitted is looked at by the director. Some of the artists receive studio visits and some of those artists are exhibited. White Columns maintained a slide registry of emerging artists, which is now an online curated artist registry.

== History and locations ==
White Columns was founded in 1970 in the SoHo neighborhood of New York City by artists Jeffrey Lew and Gordon Matta-Clark. It was then known as 112 Workshop/112 Greene Street.

In 1979 it relocated to 325 Spring Street and was renamed White Columns. Directors of White Columns have included Josh Baer, Tom Solomon, Bill Arning, Paul Ha, Lauren Ross, and current director Matthew Higgs.

In 1991 it moved to Christopher Street in Greenwich Village. In 1998, White Columns moved to a location on the border of Greenwich Village and the Meatpacking District, initiated by then-director Ha, who inaugurated the space with the exhibition "Inventory". In 2018, White Columns relocated to its present location at 91 Horatio Street, close to the Whitney Museum of American Art and the High Line.

Since being founded, White Columns has supported and provided exposure to hundreds of artists including Alice Aycock, Stephen Laub, Willoughby Sharp, Kiki Smith, Sonic Youth, Andres Serrano, Lorna Simpson, John Currin, Cady Noland, Tyler Turkle, Sarah Sze, Lutz Bacher and others. To this day, White Columns continues its support for artists with an ongoing program of exhibitions and to hundreds of other artists through their online Artist Registry.

In 2006, director Matthew Higgs initiated the White Columns Annual, a yearly exhibition with guest curators that highlights work that has been on view in New York City in the prior year. It has been curatored by artists and art figures like Mary Manning, Bridget Donahue, Bob Nickas, Pati Hertling, and Randy Kennedy.

== 112 Workshop ==
From 1970 to 1980 112 Workshop was an Artists-run studio and exhibition space that helped to define Minimal conceptual art and Post-conceptual art practice in New York City. It was founded by Jeffrey Lew and Gordon Matta-Clark at 112 Greene Street in Soho. The space contributed to the development of Conceptual art and Postmodern dance of the early 1970s and Post-conceptual art in the late-1970s. In 1979 it relocated to 325 Spring Street, and was renamed White Columns.

=== Participating artists ===
At 112 Workshop, artists were given free rein to produce, experiment and challenge art orthodoxies. In this crumbling large space, Gordon Matta-Clark installed his work Walls Paper in 1972. Vito Acconci locked himself in a tiny room with a fighting cock in a piece he called Combination (1971). Following their first New York performance at the Leo Castelli Gallery, Richard Landry and Musicians presented five concerts at 112 in March 1972 and Carmen Beuchat presented her dance/performance Mass in C B Minor or the Brown Table the same year (1972).

=== Homage Exhibition ===
In 2011, David Zwirner Gallery presented the exhibition 112 Greene Street: The Early Years (1970–1974).

== Discography ==
- Noise Festival Tape (1982) TSoWC White Columns
