= Ridykeulous =

Artist collective

- Formation: 2005
- Founder: Nicole Eisenman and A.L. Steiner
- Purpose: Arts collective

Ridykeulous is a curatorial initiative founded by artists Nicole Eisenman and A.L. Steiner. The project encourages exhibitions of queer and feminist art.

== History ==
Founded in 2005, Ridykeulous mounts exhibitions and events primarily concerned with queer and feminist art, using humor to critique the art world as well as culture at large.

Collaborators include A.K. Burns, Aaron Johnson, Anna Sew Hoy, Celeste Dupuy-Spencer, Cody Critcheloe/SSION, Cyrus Saint Amand Poliakoff, Dana Schutz, Dawn Frasch, Dawn Kasper, Dawn Mellor, Dean Daderko, Eve Fowler, Math Bass, Robinson Fastwurms, Leidy Churchman, Ulrike Muller, Zackary Drucker, Suzanne Wright, Kathe Burkhart, Christian Lemerz, K8 Hardy, Lara Schnitger, Ashley Reid, Lindsay Brant, Lisa Sanditz, Daphne Fitzpatrick, Lisi Raskin, Catherine Lord, Keith Boadwee, Ellen Lesperance & Jeanine Oleson, Carrie Moyer, Adam Rolston, Nicola Tyson, Melissa Logan/Chicks on Speed, Daniel Bozhkov, Rachel Harrison, Amy Sillman, L.M. Childs, Claude Wampler, Miranda Lichtenstein, Kathy Acker, Abe Ajay, Mike Albo, Artists Poster Committee (Frazier Dougherty, Jon Hendricks, Irving Petlin), Kathe Burkhart, Nao Bustamante, Jibz Cameron, Leidy Churchman, Dennis Cooper, Tracey Emin, Daniel Feinberg, Louise Fishman, Glen Fogel, Hollis Frampton, Simon Fujiwara, Gary Gissler, Guerilla Art Action Group (G.A.A.G.), Harmony Hammond, Kathleen Hanna and Toby Vail, I.U.D., Donald Judd, Zoe Leonard, Ali Liebegott, Lucy Lippard, Bernadette Mayer, Allyson Mitchell & Deirdre Logue, Eileen Myles, Chuck Nanney, Genesis Breyer P-Orridge, Laura Parnes, Adrian Piper, William Powhida, Ad Reinhardt, Carolee Schneemann, Nancy Spero, Kara Walker, and David Wojnarowicz.

== Publications ==
- Steiner, A.L.; Eisenmann, Nicole (2006). RIDYKEULOUS (Zine). New York City, New York: Leo Koenig Gallery.

== Exhibitions ==
Date	Exhibition title	Location	Notes
2006	Ridykeulous	Participant Inc., New York City, New York	
2007	An Evening with Ridykeulous: At Least It's Not Abstract!	The Kitchen, New York City, New York	
2008	Ridykeulous: That Looks Really Cute on You!	Bronx Museum of the Arts, Bronx, New York	
2008	Ridykeulous: The Odds Are Against Us	MoMA PS1, Queens, New York	
2009	Ridykeulous Hits Bottom	Leo Koenig Projekte, Brooklyn, New York	
2011	Readykeulous: The Hurtful Healer, The Correspondance Issue	Invisible Exports, New York City, New York	
2014	Readykeulous by Ridykeulous: This is What Liberation Feels Like™	Contemporary Art Museum St. Louis, St. Louis, Missouri	
2014	Readykeulous by Ridykeulous: This is What Liberation Feels Like™	Institute of Contemporary Art, Philadelphia, Philadelphia, Pennsylvania	
2017	Divided States of America	The Lesbian, Gay, Bisexual & Transgender Community Center, New York City, New York	Group exhibition
