= Eve Fowler =

American photographer (born 1964)

- Born: 1964 (age 61–62)
- Education: Temple University, Yale University
- Known for: Photography
- Awards: California Community Foundation Award

Eve Fowler (born 1964) is an American Artist based in Los Angeles.

Fowler was born in Philadelphia, PA and has been living and working in Los Angeles since 2002. Fowler's most notable work includes her series of texts appropriating Gertrude Stein's poetry, and her portraits of male hustlers in New York and Los Angeles in the 90s. Identifying as a lesbian and feminist, Fowler's work tries to identify what she perceives as male biases in language and culture and reframe them around sex-positive, feminist, and queered images. For example, her 2005 portrait of performance artist K8 Hardy recalls Austrian feminist, VALIE EXPORT's 1969 work Action Pants: Genital Panic by depicting Hardy in her studio, sitting wide legged with the crotch cut out of her jeans.

== Biography ==
Fowler received her BA in Journalism from Temple University in 1986, and her MFA in photography from Yale University in 1992. Her work has been included in group exhibitions at the Museum of Modern Art, Hammer Museum, Yerba Buena Center, and San Francisco Museum of Art.

Following her education, Fowler spent four years portraying" gay male hustlers" working the streets in New York and Los Angeles, for which she first gained recognition in the art world.

== Work ==
=== "Shared Women" February - April 2007 ===
A group exhibition hosted by the Los Angeles Contemporary Exhibitions (LACE), featuring Fowler's filmworks alongside the works of feminist artists A.L. Steiner and Emily Roysdon. Emphasis was placed on themes such as cronyism, feminism, nepotism, elements of reaffirmation that depended on the reorganization of history from portraying ‘the women’ and ‘the gays,’ as outsiders to now insiders.

=== "Wimmin by Womyn who love Wymin" January - March 2006 ===
A two-person exhibition at the Harry Levine Gallery in Culver City, California, "Wimmin by Womyn who love Wymin" featured the works of A.L. Steiner and Fowler. Both artists worked on a photo projected involving taking different pictures of the same women, juxtaposing themes depicting calm sexual subjects from rough, unmounted, and funny "snapshot porntraitrure".

=== "With it which it as it if it is to be" November - December 2016 ===
This was a film called with it which it as it if it is to be. It was screened at MOCA in 2017 and later had a part two exhibition at the Morán Morán. The film was used to capture working artists in their studios as well as shine light on the “intimate spaces of women’s art work” as written by Rachel Valinsky. This film also intended to feature different artists from Gertude Stein's writing, “Many Many women,” (1910). Fowler’s intentions were to create a piece that was about demonstrating the art of creation.

=== "These Sounds Fall Into My Mind" September - October 2019 ===
This exhibition at the Morán Morán includes a film entitled with it which it as it if it is to be, Part II, a video that shares the same name as the exhibition, and six wall pieces. This exhibition focuses on the feminist perspective on text, language and art. Fowler's film is 33 minutes long and has documented 20 female artists in the later stages of their careers reading Gertrude Stein’s Many Many Women. The wall pieces are stills taken from the video and were made with car paint and aluminum.

== Awards ==
- Foundation for Contemporary Arts, NY, NY, The Roy Lichtenstein Award, 2022
- John Simon Memorial Guggenheim Fellowship 2021
- Printed Matter Awards for Artists (2009)
- California Community Foundation Award (2007)
- San Francisco Museum of Modern Art, San Francisco, CA
- The New Museum, New York City, NY

In 2007, Fowler received the California Community Foundation Award for her photographic work that compassed the variety of aesthetic approaches, disciplines, and reflected the eclectic character of the Los Angeles contemporary art scene.

Fowler is also a recipient of the 2017 Art Matters grant, and was a 2019 fellow with Harvard's Radcliffe Institute.
