= A.K. Burns =

Female American artist

A. K. Burns
- Born: 1975 (age 50–51); Capitola, CA
- Education: Rhode Island School of Design Milton Avery Graduate School of the Arts at Bard College
- Awards: Guggenheim Fellowship, Berlin Prize, NYSCA/NYFA Fellowship, Radcliffe Fellowship, American Academy of Arts and Letters, Creative Capital Foundation
- Website: https://akburns.net/

A. K. Burns (née Aisha Khalilah Burnes; 1975, Capitola, California) is a New York-based interdisciplinary artist and educator working with video, installation, sculpture, drawing-collage, writing and collaboration. Working through a trans-feminist lens Burns explores the nexus of language and materiality. Her artwork troubles hegemonic systems and their impact on gender, labor, ecology and sexuality. A. K. Burns is an Associate Professor and MFA Co-Director at Hunter College, Department of Art & Art History. Burns is a 2023 Berlin Prize Fellow at the American Academy in Berlin and a 2021 Guggenheim Fellow in Fine Art. Burns has works in several public collections including the Museum of Modern Art and Whitney Museum of American Art. Burns is currently represented by Michel Rein Gallery, Paris/Brussels, and Video Data Bank, Chicago. Burns is gender non-conforming and has no preferred pronoun.

== Early life and career ==
Burns was born in Capitola, California in 1975 to Sisene Strehl (née Sisene Bunn) and Peter Burnes. Burns' parents divorced when she was three and received an alternative upbringing in the Bay Area. Due to the financial burden of raising a large family, her mother relocated to a small rural town in the Sierra Nevada foothills when she was 14, splitting Burns’ time in high school between Palo Alto and San Andreas, CA. Burns is the eldest of six siblings from her mother’s subsequent two marriages.

Influenced by her grandmother who was a painter, Burns began practicing art at an early age. She attended Henry M. Gunn High School in Palo Alto and Rhode Island School of Design, graduating with a degree in Graphic Design in 1998. Burns moved to Oakland after college where she founded the design business and studio Tumbleweed. In 2001 Burns and artist Kevin Slagle opened the gallery project Ego Park in Oakland which ran until 2008.

A.K. Burns is gender non-conforming and has no preferred pronoun.

== Collaborative Artworks ==
Burns moved to New York City in 2003, where she was introduced to the collective Lesbians to the Rescue (LTTR). Burns worked closely with LTTR both as a graphic designer for the publication and as a contributing artist. The expansive community of queer artists Burns met through LTTR were formative for Burns’ later collaborations. In 2007 Burns began her MFA in Sculpture at Milton Avery Graduate School of the Arts at Bard College. On the first day of classes at Bard, Burns met her future wife Katherine Hubbard who was pursuing her MFA in Photography. Burns and Hubbard would go on to collaborate on many projects beginning with The Brown Bear: Neither Particular nor General, a performance that intentionally conflated the hair and art salon as a site for public engagement developed through a residency at Recess in 2010, and The Poetry Parade, a thematic migrating feminist literary intervention that took place within the collections of public art museums at Museum of Modern Art in 2012 and the Whitney Museum of American Art in 2015. Burns’ time at Bard resulted in a series of other pivotal collaborations. In 2009, Burns co-founded Randy Magazine with Swedish photographer, gallerist and publisher Sophie Mörner. Randy was a publishing and curatorial project that brought together trans-feminist perspectives celebrating the politics of art, sexuality and aesthetics. Randy issues were compiled in 2016 in the book Randy 2010-2013, published by Capricious Publishing.

=== Working Artist and the Greater Economy (W.A.G.E.) ===
In 2008, Burns co-founded W.A.G.E., an artists’ advocacy organization established to support equitable fiscal relations between artists and the arts institutions that hire them. The organization’s first public speeches were delivered at the Park Avenue Armory on the occasion of the Democracy Now Creative Time Summit in 2008. In 2012 as W.A.G.E. evolved from an activist collective to a 501 c-3 Non-profit organization that certifies arts organizations nationally, Burns transitioned from core organizer to board member, ultimately leaving W.A.G.E. in 2015 to focus on pursuing teaching and her art career.

=== Community Action Center (2010) ===
During her first year as an MFA student at Milton Avery Graduate School of the Arts at Bard College, Burns began collaborating with A.L. Steiner on W.A.G.E. and Community Action Center, a single channel video project that archives an inter-generational community built on collaboration, friendship, sex and art. Inspired by gay porn-romance-liberation films of the 60s’ and 70s’, the work reexamines how sex and sexuality is imaged and imagined for marginalized bodies—in particular for women, trans and non-binary persons. The work features many friends and long-time collaborators of Burns’ and Steiner’s including: Eileen Myles, Ashland Mines, and Wu Tsang. Completed in 2010, Community Action Center was ranked no.20 in The 25 Works of Art That Define the Contemporary Age” by the New York Times in 2019 as well as ranked no. 18 in “The 100 Works of Art That Defined the Decade” by Artnet in 2020. Community Action Center is held in the public collections at MoMA, and Julia Stoschek Foundation, and is distributed by Video Data Bank in Chicago, IL.

== Later artworks ==
2012 marked a turning point in Burns' practice from working primarily through collaborative projects a more solitary studio artist. Burns' work orients around formal and material inquiry into the relationship between ecological, social and political structures, with particular interest in themes concerning economic hierarchies, environment and ecology, animacy, and gender and sexuality.

=== Sculpture and wall works ===
Burns’ sculptures often feature industrial materials including sandblasted and powder-coated steel and processes that explore the poetics of decay, destruction and rebirth. In the series The Dispossessed (2018), commissioned by FRONT International: Triennial for Contemporary Art, and Known/Unknown (2016), the artist critically explores confinement and borders by bending and inserting text into fences. Since 2017 Burns’ has been producing sculptures for her Depleted Figures series, where she bends steel remesh and rebar into figure-like shapes that appear almost like line drawings in space. Each figure includes only the extremities—hands and/or feet— rendered either literally in concrete or more abstractly through cast and ready-made household objects. As figures they lack a wholeness or true body, only the skeletal understructure remains. These works represent exhaustive bodily conditions where labor (as in, birth and the workforce) are treated as an extractive resource in late capitalism. Burns also produces collages, photographs and sculptural reliefs. In her Disturbed Mirror series (2019-2023), Burns punctures and punctuates hand-ladled glass with various materials. The glass is then coated with silver-nitrate— a material traditionally applied to thin sheets of glass to create the reflective surface of mirrors. These mirrored reliefs are created through an interaction between molten glass and materials that combust (such as leather gloves, old jeans, rope, pine cones, and paper bags) leaving a ghostly imprint. Carbon from the combustion and materials such as copper, rocks, and sand tolerate the extreme heat and become embedded in the glass. Transforming beyond their function as a reflection for the narcissistic gaze of humanism, these mirrors instead illuminate the tension of an interior cosmology of material life.

=== Audio-video installations ===
Burns often installs video and audio components into her exhibitions as well as creating stand alone video installations. These works involve extensive research and collaboration, and explore interconnected themes including ecology, sexuality, institutions and power. Burns considers audio-video works to be time-based sculptures, installing works to interact with the exhibition environment in specific ways. This is one of many tactics Burns uses to draw attention to perceptual and experiential experience of the viewer and therefore often intervenes in exhibition environments to query preconceived notions about architecture and built environs, the hierarchies of information and perception the viewer may experience.

Video projects include Touch Parade (2011), a 5-channel installation that explores fetish culture and the assimilation of marginalized sexuality on the Internet, Survivor’s Remorse (2018), a 9-channel installation commissioned by the Harvard Art Museums that takes the life and art of David Wojnarowicz as a point of departure to examine the unequal distribution of value between artists’ living bodies and the bodies of work they produce, and Untitled (eclipse) (2019), a silent 16mm film shot in Nebraska during the total solar eclipse in 2017. This work is often installed with the Leave No Trace vinyl record, an interactive soundtrack for the piece. This record has also been displayed alone, or with a poem also titled Leave No Trace that Burns displays by CNC routering the text into the surface of the walls of the exhibition space.

=== Negative Space (2015-2023) ===
Working over a decade Burns completed Negative Space, a series of multi-channel video installations that compose a four-part epic, in 2023. Through a process of conjuring and deconstructing science fiction tropes, the work interrogates anthropocentric inclinations, proposing that in changing perception--how we define, know, and organize life-- lies the potential to alter our world building. Each video is a non-linear and poetic work structured around a physical system: void, body, land and water, respectively. The opening episode, A Smeary Spot, was produced with support from the Creative Capital Foundation Visual Arts Award and debuted at Participant Inc., NY in 2015. The second episode, Living Room, debuted in 2017 at the New Museum, NY, when Burns was an Artist-in-Residence, New Museum Spring 2017 Research and Development Season. In 2019 the third work, Leave No Trace, premiered at the Julia Stoschek Collection in Dusseldorf, Germany, produced with the support of EMPAC at Rensselaer Polytechnic Institute, Troy, New York. The final episode, What is Perverse is Liquid, debuted at The Wexner Center for the Arts, Columbus, OH in 2019, produced with the support of the Guggenheim Foundation when Burns was Guggenheim Fellow in Fine Arts in 2021.These installations raise questions about the relationship between land use, environmental fragility, historical narratives, and the systemic production of marginalized experiences. Negative Space features performers from Burns’ community of artists, choreographers, and musicians including: Will Rawls, Keyon Gaskin, Shannon Funches, Savannah Knoop, Nic Kay, Naylnd Blake, Jen Rosenblit, Niv Acosta, Clara Lopez Menendez, Marcelo Gutierrez, Lee Relvas, Monica Mirabile, Marbles Jumbo Radio, A.L. Steiner and others. Each work is scored by the artist Geo Wyeth. The completed work was exhibited as part of a survey exhibition, “Of space we are...," at the Wexner Center for the Arts, Ohio State University, Columbus, OH in 2023. Dancing Foxes Press and the Wexner Center for the Arts co-published the monograph, A.K. Burns: Negative Space, with the exhibition. The book includes texts by CA Conrad, Mel Y. Chen, Aruna D’Souza, Megan Hicks, Simone White, as well as a conversation between A.K. Burns and Karen Archey.

== Writing and publications ==
- A.K. Burns: Negative Space
  - Monograph published following the completion of the four part science fiction video epic, Negative Space, and on the occasion of the work’s first complete exhibition in “Of space we are...” at Wexner Center for the Arts at The Ohio State University in Columbus, OH. Includes texts by CA Conrad, Mel Y. Chen, Aruna D’Souza, Megan Hicks, Simone White, as well as a conversation between A.K. Burns and Karen Archey. Edited by Karen Kelly and Barbara Schroeder, and published by Dancing Foxes Press, Brooklyn, NY and Wexner Center for the Arts, Columbus, OH. Published 2023.
- Zero: A.K. Burns on Nancy Holt
  - This book is based on a lecture about Nancy Holt originally presented at Dia Art Foundation’s Artists on Artists Lecture Series, Dia:Chelsea, New York, on November 27, 2018. Burns read a text alongside a performative slideshow, which was later published as a book by Callicoon Fine Arts. Published 2019.
- Randy Zine and Book
  - Initiated in 2009 as a publishing and curatorial project, Randy produced four issues. Clark Solack Burns and Sophie Morner for Issue 3 and 4 as co-editor. Randy was an intentionally irregular trans-feminist project celebrating the politics of art, sexuality and aesthetics. Randy 2010-2013, a compendium publication of all four issues, published in 2016. Randy was published by Capricious Publishing.
- Community Action Center Zine
  - Printed in conjunction with the release of the feature-film Community Action Center. Includes essay by Litia Perta, edited and assembled with A.L. Steiner.
- Burns has published writing in publications such as Out Magazine, Photoworks: Photography, Art, Visual Culture, and ARTFORUM, and contributed essays to publications including Taylor Davis: One Day at a Time published by Arbor Press, and The Little Joe Club House Reader edited by David Edgar & Sam Ashby and published by Ditto Press.

== Awards and fellowships ==
- 2023: Berlin Prize, Fellow at the American Academy, Berlin, Germany
- 2021: Guggenheim Fellow in Fine Arts, New York, NY; American Academy of Arts and Letters, Art Awards Purchase Program, New York, NY
- 2018: NYSCA/NYFA Fellow in Interdisciplinary Art
- 2017: BMW Art Journey Award Shortlist, Art Basel Miami, Miami, FL; EMPAC Commission & Residency, Experimental Media and Performing Arts Center at Rensselaer Polytechnic Institute, Troy, New York; Artist-in-Residence, New Museum Spring 2017 Research and Development Season, New York, NY
- 2016: Radcliffe Fellow, at Radcliffe Institute for Advanced Studies at Harvard University, Cambridge, MA
- 2015: Creative Capital Foundation Visual Arts Award, New York, NY
- 2011: Residency, Fire Island Artists Residency, Cherry Grove, FI, NY
- 2010: Artist-in-Residence, Recess Activities Inc., New York, NY
