= Ulrike Müller (artist) =

Austrian artist

Ulrike Mülller
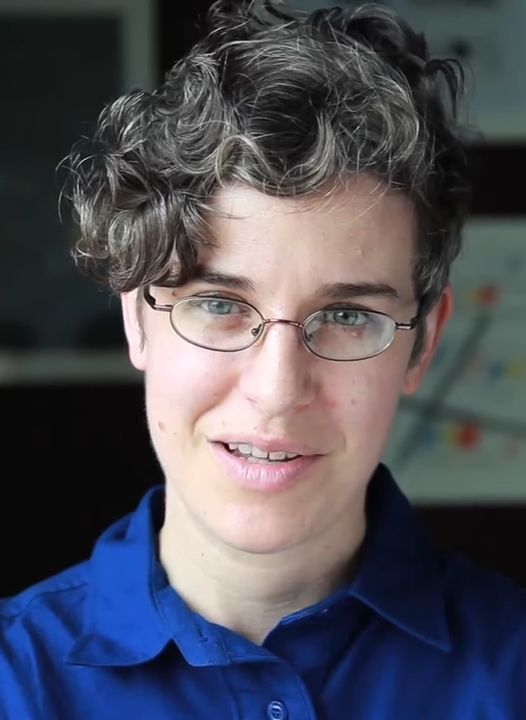
- Müller in 2012
- Born: 1971 (age 54–55); Brixlegg, Austria
- Website: um.encore.at

Ulrike Müller (born 1971 in Brixlegg, Austria) is a contemporary visual artist. Müller is a member of the New York-based feminist genderqueer group LTTR as well as an editor of its eponymous journal. She also represented Austria at the Cairo Biennale in 2011. She is currently a professor and co-chair of Painting at the Milton Avery Graduate School of the Arts at Bard College in Annandale-on-Hudson, New York.

== Early life ==
Ulrike Müller was born in 1971 in Brixlegg, Austria. From 1991 to 1996 Müller studied painting at the Academy of Fine Arts Vienna, in Austria. She also studied painting at the University of Applied Arts Vienna, Austria and attended both the Whitney Museum Independent Study Program and the PS1 Studio Program.

== Career ==
Mülller's practice has been described as addressing contemporary feminist and Genderqueer concerns, extending from the feminist movements of the 1970s and onward. She is a member of the feminist genderqueer collective LTTR. She uses techniques of painting, performance, sculpture, publishing, geometrics, abstraction, video/audio, and textiles to explore questions of body and identity politics and interrupt and criticize the gender binaries. For instance, for her exhibition Raw/Cooked at the Brooklyn Museum in 2012, Müller invited a range of feminist and queer artists, including Nicole Eisenman, A.L. Steiner and Amy Sillman to create two-dimensional renderings of t-shirt quotes taken from the Lesbian Herstory Archives in Brooklyn.

Ulrike Müller currently teaches painting at the Milton Avery Graduate School of the Arts at Bard College. Previously, she was on the faculty for the Vermont College of Fine Arts’ low-residency MFA in Visual Arts program, and has lectured in painting/printmaking at Yale University since 2013.

=== Themes ===
Müller’s art typically uses abstraction to play with representation with the intention of combine social and individual experiences as well as to blur the connection between the artist and the viewer. She strives to disrupt traditional gender norms and suggest alternatives through her feminist lens. Müller’s paintings are largely influenced by geometric abstraction to create an intimate relationship between color and shape. Through her paintings, she examines how color and shape can express ideas of representation, identity, and body. Müller strives for radical feminism, placing her work outside the usual scope of abstract and geometric painting, creating links between form, social context, and identity.

=== Herstory Inventory ===
Herstory Inventory an exhibition in the Brooklyn Museum's series Raw/Cookedwas meant to revise and respond to the feminist work The Dinner Party by Judy Chicago in 1974–79. The Dinner Party displayed a series of photographic panels to bring recognition to minority pieces of art. Müller transformed this idea, involving feminist and queer artists to take quotations from T-Shirts from the Lesbian Herstory Archives and create 2D objects. Herstory is history written from a feminist perspective, emphasizing the role of women, or told from a woman's point of view. Raw/Cooked had a variety of results, but all involved the relationship between abstraction and representation. The project was successful in its focus on the diverse artists’ agencies.

=== And Then Some ===
And Then Some is Müller's most recent concluded solo project with Callicoon Fine Arts. The exhibition ran from 15 September to 30 October 2016. And Then Some involved paper and oil paintings contextualized with rugs and enamel designs. Müller aimed to explore and combine the contexts of different mediums and materials. Using a wall painting the grey color of the floor, she forces viewers to question their own perception of space and objects. And Then Some explores how these perceptions of space and objects are created or suggested even without a recognized identity. Müller expands this idea to gender, expressing how different elements of objects suggest certain knowledge or identities surrounding gender. For example, there is one piece made of enamel - a typically industrial material - that acts as a mirror to the viewer, convincing them to question such ideas about the medium.

=== LTTR ===
LTTR is a feminist genderqueer collective with a flexible project oriented practice. Its aim is to celebrate different forms of feminist art and unite people together. Müller joined in 2005 and has been actively involved both as an individual and a collective artist. She helps in editing the journal and organizing different events and exhibitions. Others involved with LTTR are Ginger Brooks Takahashi, K8 Hardy and Emily Roysdon, and Lanka Tattersal.

== Recognition ==
Müller is recognized for her efforts to revise outdated ideas of representation and expression in feminism. She is renowned for her various exhibitions that strive to give minority artists agency in their goal to break rules of patriarchy. She is also known for using her mediums to their absolute potential to build on ideas of the body and its connection to the world. The artistic public values Müller's revisiting of modernist abstraction and how she transforms it, forcing it to represent themes of the outside world such as the gendered body. Her use of subtlety and historical revisionism allows her to reconsider art history and feminist history and how they influence and represent the modern world.

=== Select solo exhibitions ===
- Container, Kunstverein für die Rheinlande und Westfahlen, Düsseldorf (2018)
- And Then Some, Callicoon Fine Arts (2016)
- The old expressions are with us always and there are always others, Museum Moderner Kunst Foundation Ludwig Vienna (2015)
- Weather, Callicoon Fine Arts (2014)
- untitled, Kunstraum Lakeside, Klagenfurt, Austria (2014)
- Herstory Inventory, Brooklyn Museum (2012)
- Feminism Formalism, Steinle Contemporary, Munich (2010)
- Fever 013, Artpace, San Antonio (2010)
- Ten in One (2004)

=== Select group exhibitions ===
- Woven Histories: Textiles and Modern Abstraction, National Gallery of Art, Washington, DC (2024)
- 57th Carnegie International, Carnegie Museum of Art Pittsburgh, PA (2018)
- Trigger: Gender as a Tool and a Weapon, New Museum, New York (2017)
- 78th Whitney Biennial, New York, (17 March – 11 June 2017)
- Dropout at Site 131, Callicoon Fine Arts (2016)
- Invisible Adversaries, Hessel Museum of Art, Annandale-on-Hudson (2016)
- Blackness in Abstraction, Pace Gallery, New York (2016)
- Painting 2.0: Expression in the Information Age, Museum Brandhorst München (2015) and mumok Museum Moderner Kunst Stiftung Ludwig, Vienna (2016)
- Always, Always, Others (2015)
- Herstory Inventory: 100 Feminist Drawings by 100 Artists, Kunsthaus Bregenz (2012)
- Sonic Episodes, Dia Art Foundation (2009)
- Unmonumental Audio, New Museum (2008)

=== Select publications ===
- Work the Room. A Handbook on Performance Strategies. OE/b_books, 2006. (editor)
- An Idea-Driven Social Space. Ulriker Muller and Andrea Geyer. Grey Room 35, MIT Press. Cambridge. 2009.
- Fever 103, Franza, and Quilts. Dancing Foxes Press, 2012.
- Herstory Inventory. Dancing Foxes Press, 2014.
- (with Manuela Ammer:) Always, Always, Others mumok Vienna and Dancing Foxes Press, 2017

== See also ==
- Feminist art movement in the United States
- Abstract art
- Geometric abstraction
- Herstory
