= Celeste Dupuy-Spencer =

American painter (1979–2026)

- Born: December 22, 1979; New York City, U.S.
- Died: April 10, 2026 (aged 46); Los Angeles, California, U.S.
- Education: Bard College
- Known for: Painting
- Parent(s): Coco Dupuy and Scott Spencer

Celeste Thais Dupuy-Spencer (December 22, 1979 – April 10, 2026) was an American painter.

== Background ==
Dupuy-Spencer was born in New York City on December 22, 1979, to artist Coco Dupuy and novelist Scott Spencer and grew up in Rhinebeck, New York. She received a BFA degree in 2007 from Bard College, where she studied with painter Nicole Eisenman. She was based in Los Angeles, California. She died on April 10, 2026, at the age of 46. Her cause of death was suicide.

== Career ==
Dupuy-Spencer began exhibiting in 2007, including collaborations with Ridykeulous Project. In 2015, her work was included in the show Queer Fantasy at Morán Morán in Los Angeles. She had solo shows at the Nino Mier Gallery in 2016 and 2018, and at the Marlborough Gallery in 2017.

Dupuy-Spencer was included in the 2017 Whitney Biennial.

Her work was included in the Hammer Museum's 2018 exhibition Made in L.A. 'Elle magazine reported that one of the co-curators of the Hammer's exhibition, Anne Ellegood, "[said] Dupuy-Spencer is set to become 'one of the great painters of her generation."

Also in 2018, Dupuy-Spencer had a residency at the Elaine de Kooning House in East Hampton, New York. Dupuy-Spencer's work was included in the 2022 exhibition Women Painting Women at the Modern Art Museum of Fort Worth.

Her work was also included in "Yesterday We Said Tomorrow", the fifth iteration of the triennial Prospect New Orleans. Her painting "Don't You See That I Am Burning" (2021), depicting the January 6 riot at the U.S. Capitol Building that occurred earlier that year, was presented at the Ogden Museum of Southern Art.

Dupuy-Spencer's work is held in the permanent collection of the Whitney Museum of American Art.

== Personal life ==
Although she was routinely described professionally in terms of she/her pronouns, and said she had no preference with respect to pronouns, Dupuy-Spencer identified as trans and said she did not identify as a woman or use gendered nouns to describe herself. She was an atheist who was raised culturally Jewish.
