= Ulrike Müller =

Ulrike Müller may refer to:

- Ulrike Müller (artist) (born 1971), visual artist
- Ulrike Müller (politician) (born 1962), German politician
