= Ginger Brooks Takahashi =

American artist

- Born: July 26, 1977 (age 49)
- Occupation: American artist
- Years active: 2001–present

Ginger Brooks Takahashi (born July 26, 1977) is an American artist based in Brooklyn, New York, and North Braddock, Pennsylvania. A self-identified “punk,” Takahashi grew up in Oregon. She co-founded the feminist genderqueer collective and journal LTTR and the Mobilivre project, a touring exhibition and library. Takahashi was also a member of the band MEN. Her work consists of a collaborative project-based practice, and one of her most notable works is An Army of Lovers Cannot Fail (2004–2013), a series of quilting forums.

Takahashi is currently an adjunct professor of art at Carnegie Mellon University.

== Education ==
Takahashi received her BA from Oberlin College in 1999. She participated in the Independent Study Program at the Whitney Museum of American Art in 2007.

== Career ==
=== Past collaborations ===
==== LTTR ====
Takahashi co-founded the feminist genderqueer artist collective and annual literary journal, LTTR, with Emily Roysdon and K8 Hardy in 2001. The flexible titular acronym stood for “Lesbians to the Rescue” in the first issue, and “Listen Translate Translate Record” in the second. In addition to co-editing the journal, Takahashi also contributed to its contents. For “LTTR #1 - Lesbians to the Rescue,” she contributed screenprinted door hangers. For “LTTR #4 - Do You Wish To Direct Me,” she collaborated with Hardy, Roysdon, Ulrike Müller, and Lanka Tatersall on an editorial entitled “Pants Down at Noon.” For “LTTR #5 - Positively Nasty,” she contributed an editorial entitled, “I No We Can Reign Here.”

==== Mobilivre ====
In 2001, Takahashi helped co-found the Mobilivre-Bookmobile project. The project, created by a collective of North American artists and activists, involved touring the United States and Canada in a converted Airstream trailer, which served as an exhibition space, as well as a zine and art book library. The project was dedicated to exploring "the long held tradition of bookmobiles as traveling libraries that promote the distribution of information." The project ran until 2006; in 2003 it featured an issue of LTTR in the collection.

==== Third Leg ====
Takahashi was a member of the artist collective Third Leg along with Onya Hogan-Finlay and Logan MacDonald. The collective presented their project Welcome to Gayside (2006) in an exhibition at Eastern Edge Gallery in St. John's, Newfoundland, in 2007.

=== Current collaborations ===
==== General Sisters ====
General Sisters is Takahashi's collaborative project with artist Dana Bishop-Root. Started in 2013 with the purchase of a storefront north of Pittsburgh, its goal was to become a fully functional grocery store designed and run by and for the surrounding community. General Sisters ended up shifting focus towards anti-fracking and other activist causes that affected the neighborhood. While it now seems unlikely the storefront will open as originally intended, the project continues in the form of a community garden, website, and other sub-projects and exhibitions such as “We Will Open (With You),” 2018 at Williams College of Art.

=== Individual works ===
Takahashi's multimedia practices include painting, installation work, and crafts. One of her most notable works is An Army of Lovers Cannot Fail (2004–2013), a series of quilting forums in which participants were invited to stitch “sexually explicit but whimsical images” on Takahashi's all-white quilt. Events were organized in community spaces such as homes, galleries, gardens, and other public settings in New York City, L.A., and Philadelphia.

Some of Takahashi's exhibitions include: "Unwilling: Exercises in Melancholy" at Haverford College Cantor Fitzgerald Gallery, 2018; "Shared Women" at Los Angeles Contemporary Exhibitions, 2007; "Exile of the Imaginary" at the Generali Foundation, Vienna, 2007; "Locally Localized Gravity" at the Institute of Contemporary Art, Philadelphia, 2007; and "Alien She" at the Orange County Museum of Art, 2015. She has also presented at Serpentine Gallery, London, 2008; documenta 12, Kassel, 2007; Art Metropole, Toronto, 2007; and with Ridykeulous at The Kitchen, NY, 2007.

In 2009 Takahashi work was featured in "She Will Always Be Younger Than Us" at Textile Museum of Canada, along with work from Orly Cogan, Wednesday Lupypciw, Cat Mazza, and Gillian Strong in connection to the "When Women Rule The World: Judy Chicago in Thread" exhibit also at the Textile Museum of Canada.

In 2009 and 2010, Takahashi was one of several artists that took part in the arts-based initiative, Queer Pier: 40 Years, which coincided with the 10-year anniversary of FIERCE, an organization that builds leadership among LGBTQ youth of color in New York City. Takahashi facilitated a screen-printing workshop to create images that showed the contributions made by members of the organization in community organizing at the piers.

In 2020, Takahashi participated in Make Our Differences Our Strengths: a billboard campaign and traveling exhibition organized by the Westmoreland Diversity Coalition in Pennsylvania.

=== Acting ===
Takahashi has also earned acting/performance credit for her role in To Valerie Solanas and Marilyn Monroe in Recognition of Their Desperation (2013), a film directed by Bernadette Paassen that was exhibited at the Badischer Kunstverein, Karlsruhe, Germany in 2013.

== Grants, awards, and residencies ==
- 2019: Environment, Health, and Public Art Initiative, The Office of Public Art, Pittsburgh, PA
- 2016: Artist-in-Residence, MacDowell Colony, Peterborough, NH
- 2014: Artist-in-Residence, Fire Island Residency Program, Fire Island, New York
- 2009: Artist-in-Residence, Abrons Art Center, New York, NY
- 2009: Artist-in-Residence, The Center for Book Arts, New York, NY
- 2008: Studio Residency, Smack Mellon, Brooklyn, NY
- 2005: Keyholder Residency, Lower East Side Print Shop, New York, NY
