= Robert Sward =

American and Canadian poet (1933–2022)

Robert Sward (23 June 1933 – 21 February 2022) was an American and Canadian poet and novelist.

Jack Foley, in his introduction to Sward's Collected Poems, 1957–2004, called him, "in truth, a citizen, at heart, of both countries. At once a Canadian and American poet, one with a foot in both worlds, Sward also inhabits an enormous in-between."

== Early years ==
Sward was born on 23 June 1933 and raised in Chicago, Illinois. He began writing poetry at the age of 15 when he became involved with a street gang and used rhyming couplets in his notes to the other gang members. He graduated from Von Steuben High School at 17 and quit his job as a soda jerk in a pharmacy to join the United States Navy. In 1952, he was stationed in Korea on an amphibious ship, LST 914. A Yeoman 3rd Class, Sward soon became the head of the ship's library, while serving in the combat zone during the Korean War.

== University ==
He taught at Cornell University, 1964–65, where he first experimented with computer-generated poetry and served on the editorial board of Epoch. He went on to teach at the Iowa Writers' Workshop, the University of Victoria, and the University of California, Santa Cruz.

== Working in media ==
In the 1980s, he worked for the CBC, where he interviewed and produced 60-minute radio features on Leonard Cohen, Margaret Atwood, Earle Birney, John Robert Colombo, Al Purdy, Gwendolyn MacEwen, and other leading Canadian figures. His Quill & Quire interview with Nobel prize winner, Saul Bellow, was widely read. Sward also worked as journalist, book reviewer and feature writer for The Toronto Star, The Globe and Mail, and The Financial Times in Toronto, Ontario while living on the Toronto Islands. He received a Canada Council grant to research and write The Toronto Islands (1983), a best-selling (Source: Dreadnaught Press publisher, 1983) illustrated history of a unique community, from prehistoric times to the present.

== Awards ==
A Fulbright Scholar and Guggenheim Fellow, he was chosen by Lucille Clifton to receive a Villa Montalvo Literary Arts Award and was the author of 30 books of poetry, fiction and nonfiction. He was published widely in numerous anthologies and traditional literary magazines, such as The New Yorker, Poetry Chicago, and The Hudson Review. Sward later worked as technical writer and editor for Santa Cruz Operation (SCO), and served as "bridge person" between traditional hard copy academic periodicals and literary eZines.

In September 2016, at Second Annual Voices of the River Poetry Celebration, supported by a grant from Arts Council Santa Cruz County, sponsored by Bookshop Santa Cruz, Poetry Santa Cruz and the Coastal Watershed Council, Robert Sward was named Poet Laureate of Santa Cruz County, 2016–2018. The preceding Poets Laureate included Gary Young, David Swanger and Ellen Bass

In 2020 Sward received a Reginald Lockett Lifetime Achievement Award from PEN Oakland.

== Internet publishing ==
He began publishing on the Internet in the late 1980s and early 90s with appearances in Alsop Review, Blue Moon Review, Web de Sol, X-Connect, eSCENE, Fiction Online, Hawk, Realpoetik, and Zero City. His essay, "Why I Publish in e-Zines", appeared online in 1995 and has been widely reprinted. Sward's "Earthquake Collage," impressions, news items, poetry, and facts regarding the 1989 Loma Prieta earthquake and its aftermath, appeared in "Pathways to the Past, Adventures in Santa Cruz County History, History Journal Number 6," Museum of Art and History, Santa Cruz, CA, April 2009.

Sward had an active personal website: www.robertsward.com Sward created MonoBlogAlz.com as a memorial for his late wife Gloria K. Alford, 1928–2017, a well-known West Coast visual artist.

== Books ==
Sward's first book, Uncle Dog & Other Poems (1962), was published by Putnam & Co. in England. It was followed by Kissing the Dancer (Cornell University Press, 1964), with an Introduction by Pulitzer Prize poet William Meredith. The Carleton Miscellany reviewed the book saying, "In the animal poems there is a bravery in the face of our limitations, a warmth for our absurdities, a way of life to be gleaned from our failings and ineptitudes... a self-critique that turns our freakishness into an ironic source of fulfillment and transcendence." Source: Theodore Holmes in "The Carleton Miscellany" 1964. The poem, "Uncle Dog: The Poet At 9", has been frequently anthologized and Sward continues to write about exotic animals and dogs in particular. Animated videos of these works (mini-movies with poetry) employ avatars, digital representations of the poet and his subjects, and appear in DVD format and online at Blue's Cruzio Cafe.

A key theme in his last books, Rosicrucian in the Basement (2001), Heavenly Sex (2002), The Collected Poems, 1957–2004 (2004), and God is in the Cracks (2006), is fathers and sons. Sward's father, Irving M. Sward, was a podiatrist and something of a mystic, combining his practice of Rosicrucianism with a study of the Kabbalah. Of Rosicrucian in the Basement, Robert Bly writes, 'There are many mysteries between father and son that people don't talk about... There's much leaping [in Sward's poetry], but each line, so to speak, steps on something solid.' In commenting on the father and son series Dana Gioia adds, "The CD is terrific... Rosicrucian in the Basement unfolds perfectly at its own pace and never loses the listener." Source: Robert Sward: Poetry, Review & Interview with Jack Foley, Recorded for KPFA-FM Berkeley, CA with readings from Heavenly Sex & Rosicrucian in the Basement (2002), Uncle Dog Audio, Number 1002 (2002), and The Collected Poems, Black Moss Press, 1957–2004 (2004).

Garrison Keillor selected God is in the Cracks, one of the father and son poems and title poem of Sward's 2006 collection, for broadcast on his radio show "Writer's Almanac."

== Family ==
Sward and his life-partner, visual artist Gloria K. Alford (1928–2017), lived in Santa Cruz, California, where he took up residence in 1985, after fourteen years living and working in Canada, primarily in Victoria, B.C. (1969–1979) and on the Toronto Islands (1979–1985). A member of the League of Canadian Poets starting in 1975, Sward toured Canada with each of his new books, reviewed and helped bring noted Canadian writers to the U.S.

His literary correspondence and papers are housed at University Libraries, Washington University in St. Louis, Department of Special Collections, Olin Library, St. Louis, MO 63130. (WTU00110). Additionally Robert's papers are collected at the National Library of Canada (now Library and Archives Canada) in Ottawa, and at the University of Victoria library, Special Collections, in Victoria, British Columbia.

== Death ==
Sward died on 21 February 2022.

== Selected bibliography ==
- 1958 Advertisements – Odyssey Chapbook Publications
- 1962 Uncle Dog and Other Poems – Putnam & Company, LTD London, England
- 1964 Kissing the Dancer and Other Poems – (Introduction by William Meredith), Cornell University Press
- 1965 Thousand-Year-Old Fiancée and Other Poems – Cornell University Press
- 1970 Horgbortom Stringbottom I Am Yours You are History – Swallow Press
- 1970 Hannah's Cartoon – Soft Press, Victoria, BC
- 1970 Quorum/Noah – (with Mike Doyle) Soft Press
- 1971 Gift – Soft Press
- 1971 Innocence – 1950 – Soft Press
- 1973 Vancouver Island Poems – (editor / anthology), Soft Press
- 1975 The Jurassic Shales – Coach House Press Toronto
- 1975 Five Iowa Poems – Stonewall Press signed, numbered edition
- 1978 Honey Bear on Lasqueti Island, B.C. – Soft Press
- 1982 12 Poems – Soft Press
- 1983 The Toronto Islands – Dreadnaught Press Toronto
- 1983 Half a Life's History: Selected Poems – Aya Press Toronto
- 1983 Movies: Left to Right – Southwestern Ontario Poetry
- 1984 The Three Roberts – (with Robert Priest and Robert Zend ), HMS Press Toronto
- 1985 "Poet Santa Cruz" – Jazz Press
- 1991 Four Incarnations: New and Selected Poems, 1957–1991 – Coffee House Press
- 1996 A Much-Married Man – Ekstasis Editions, Victoria, BC
- 2000 T.S. Eliot's Love Song of J. Alfred Prufrock – Bedford Books
- 2001 Rosicrucian in the Basement – (Introduction by William Minor), Black Moss Press
- 2001 Three Dogs and a Parrot – Small Poetry Press, Concord, California
- 2003 Heavenly Sex: New & Selected Poems – Black Moss Press
- 2006 The Collected Poems of Robert Sward 1957–2004 – 2004, 2006 now in its second printing (Introduction by Jack Foley) – Black Moss Press
- 2006 God is in the Cracks, A Narrative in Voices – Black Moss Press
- 2011 New & Selected Poems, 1957–2011 – Red Hen Press
- 2020 All That I Have Not Made: Poems 1957-2020 – Hidden Brook Press

== Sources ==
- Contemporary Authors (CAAS), Gale/Thomson, Volume 206, 2003.
- Robert Sward. God is in the Cracks, A Narrative in Voices. Windsor, Ontario: Black Moss, 2006.
- Robert Sward. The Collected Poems of Robert Sward 1957–2004. Windsor, Ontario: Black Moss, 2004.
- Robert Sward. Four Incarnations: New and Selected Poems, 1957–1991. Minneapolis: Coffee House, 1991.
- University Libraries, Washington University in St. Louis, Department of Special Collections, Olin Library, St. Louis, MO 63130. Robert Sward Papers, 1957-- (WTU00110).
- Poetry Flash, No. 298, pp. 1, 8–10, 12–13, Fall 2006, "Life Is Its Own Afterlife: A Conversation With Robert Sward."
- http://www.robertsward.com
- http://www.MonoBlogAlz.com
- https://drswardscureformelancholia.blogspot.com/2007/11/dr-swards-cure-for-melancholia.html
- "The Muse DVD Magazine," Boss Productions, wboss@sbcglobal.net, 2007.
- Robert Sward: Poetry, Review & Interview with Jack Foley, Recorded for KPFA-FM Berkeley, CA with readings from Heavenly Sex & Rosicrucian in the Basement (2002) Uncle Dog Audio, Number 1002.
- "Earthquake Collage," "Pathways to the Past, Adventures in Santa Cruz County History, History Journal Number 6," Museum of Art and History, Santa Cruz, CA, April 2009.
