= Orly Cogan =

- Born: 1971 (age 53–54)
- Education: 1990-94 BFA, Maryland Institute College of Art; 1992-93 The Cooper Union for the Advancement of Science; 1992 Art Scuola di Leonardo da Vinci, Florence, Italy
- Known for: Feminist Mixed Media Pieces
- Movement: Fiber Art
- Website: orly cogan

Orly Cogan is an Israeli-American fiber artist who works with and combines multiple mediums. She is best known for crafting hand stitched embroidered figures on top of previously embroidered vintage fabrics.

== Early life and education ==
Orly Cogan was born in Jaffa, Israel in 1971. Cogan attended a Rudolf Steiner Waldorf School in her youth, attributing this education to her discovery of textiles as a medium. She stated, "The sense of freedom I felt to explore without fear of getting things wrong meant that I could become comfortable expressing myself visually." Cogan lives and works in New York City. She was educated at The Cooper Union for Advancement of Science & Art and The Maryland Institute College of Art.

== Career ==
=== Style ===
Cogan begins with vintage fabrics which served as table runners, bureau scarves and tablecloths, and had already been embroidered by an earlier and more circumscribed generation of women. Cogan then transforms the "women's work" pieces with modern images, statements about gender identity, and role models for today's woman.

=== Themes ===
Cogan typically mixes themes of old and new, to find modern feminist inspiration though "old fashioned" pieces of women's handiwork. Her work is "drawn to dichotomies, such as soft and tough, dirty and clean, fantasy and reality, especially as they relate to gender. [My work] explores common feminine archetypes and stereotypes such as Madonna/Whore, Pin-Up Girl, Lolita, and the Femme Fatale. Searching for that odd thing, the Feminist Beauty Queen, I mix subversion with flirtation, humor with power, and intimacy with frivolity, and in doing so I often straddle an ironic edge."

Discussing her 2018-2019 exhibit "Don't Call Me Princess" at Brattleboro Museum & Art Center in Brattleboro, Vermont Cogan stated, "Ultimately, my quest is to tell a story about the role of women in our ever-changing society, all the while honoring the labors of the past. In the process, I aim to provoke certain questions within the context of constantly shifting boundaries that define our relationships and our identities: What role do women want to play in society today? Who do we want to be? What kind of relationships do we want to have? Who are our role models? What are we teaching our children? American women have grown up with fairy tales in our heads, and somehow that “happily ever after” idea is instilled early on. With my own daughter I saw how strongly princesses infiltrated her play, although she had no direct exposure to Disney movies or theme parks. I edited the few fairy tales we had, changing the sexist stories to empowering ones for my child's ears."

=== Reception ===
Orly Cogan's work has been called post-modern feminist, sensual, wholesome, and erotically charged.

== Work ==
=== Major exhibitions ===
Solo

- 2018 - "Don’t Call Me Princess" Brattleboro Museum & Art Center, Brattleboro, VT
- 2010 - "Child's Play" Carl Hammer Gallery, Chicago, IL
- 2010 - "Love Street" Charlie James Charlie James Gallery, Los Angeles, CA

Featured

- 2012 - "Cross Currents" Memphis College of Art, curated by Jennifer Sargent
- 2010 - "Narrative Thread," during "Fiber Philadelphia" Wexler Gallery, PA
- 2009 - "I Want Candy" Leigh Yawkey Woodson Art Museum, Wausau Wisconsin
  - "I Want Candy" traveling exhibition. Fresno Metropolitan Museum, Fresno, California
  - "Pretty Tough: Contemporary Story telling" Aldrich Museum of Contemporary Art, CT
  - "It's Not Us, It's You" San Jose Institute of Contemporary Art, CA
  - "imMaterial" Black and White Gallery site specific installation NYC.
  - "She Will Always Be Younger Than Us" Textile Museum of Canada, with work from Wednesday Lupypciw, Cat Mazza, Gillian Strong and Ginger Brooks Takahashi in connection to the "When Women Rule The World: Judy Chicago in Thread" exhibit also at the Textile Museum of Canada.
- 2008 - "She Will Always be Younger Than Us" "Undomestic" Peppers Gallery, University of Redlands, California
- 2007 - "Pricked: Extreme Embroidery" Museum of Arts and Design, New York NY.
  - "I Want Candy" Hudson River Museum, New York
  - Elizabeth A. Sackler Center for Feminist Art
- 2006 - Brooklyn Museum digital feminist art archive project
  - "Strangers to Ourselves" curated by Julia Tratta Kimmel Center Gallery NY, NY
