= Kaleta =

Kaleta is a surname and a given name. In Old Polish kaleta denotes a pocket or a pouch. Notable people with the name include:

== Surname ==
- Aleksandra Kaleta (born 1998), Polish judoka
- Alex Kaleta (1919–1987), American ice hockey player
- Grzegorz Kaleta (born 1970), Polish canoeist
- Janusz Kaleta (born 1964), Polish bishop
- Patrick Kaleta (born 1986), American ice hockey player
- Sam Kaleta (born 1966), Samoan rugby union player

== Given name ==
- Kaleta Doolin (born 1950), American artist and philanthropist

== See also ==
- Kaleta Hydropower Plant, in Guinea
