= Cat Mazza =

American textile artist

Cat Mazza is an American textile artist. Her practice combines tactical media, activism, craft-based art making and animation in a form that has frequently been described as craftivism. She is the founder of the craftivist collective microRevolt. Mazza is an associate professor of art at the University of Massachusetts Boston.

== Biography ==
Cat Mazza (born 1977 Washington, DC) has a BFA from Carnegie Mellon University and received her master's degree from Rensselaer Polytechnic Institute. Her work has been featured in exhibitions nationally and internationally including the exhibitions Radical Lace & Subversive Knitting at the Museum of Arts and Design in New York City, Disobedient Objects at the Victoria and Albert Museum in London, Craft Futures: 40 Under 40 at the Smithsonian American Art Museum and in "She Will Always Be Younger Than Us" at the Textile Museum of Canada and the Art Gallery of Calgary, along with work from Orly Cogan, Wednesday Lupypciw, Gillian Strong, and Ginger Brooks Takahashi in connection to the "When Women Rule The World: Judy Chicago in Thread" exhibit also at the Textile Museum of Canada. Mazza has received many prestigious grants from institutions including Creative Capital, the Experimental Television Center, the Rockefeller Foundation in Media Arts, MacDowell Colony and the Craft Research Fund. She received a Creative Capital grant in 2012 for her project Knit for Defense and was a presenter at the 2011 conference The Influencers. From 1999-2002 Mazza additionally served as an Eyebeam staff member. She began working as a professor in the Art Department at UMass Boston in 2007.

== Projects ==
- Knit for Defense 2012. A project investigating war in film through the creation of visual knit stitches. This project is a combination of craft, labor, and combat and resulted in an animated work. It is currently in the permanent collection of the Smithsonian American Art Museum. To make this work, Mazza gathered video footage from military conflicts including World War II, the Vietnam War and contemporary wars in Afghanistan and Iraq and ran the footage through software which converted video pixels into stitch patterns for knitting. She then created an animation piece from the knitted stills.
- Nike Blanket Petition 2003-present. A wide blanket with the Nike logo made by networked craft hobbyists from over 40 countries with the purpose of protesting against Nike's labor abuses. This project was created under umbrella of microRevolt. This was on view in the exhibition Disobedient Objects at the Victoria and Albert Museum in London, England. In an article for the London Review of Books, Nick Richardson describes the project: "One of the best alchemical weapons in the show is a 15-foot-long blanket with the Nike ‘swoosh’ on it that was knitted and crocheted by the ‘post-craft’ artist Cat Mazza and an international group of hobbyists. Where Nike tries to conceal the labour that goes into its products, Mazza’s piece makes the labour plain. It also challenges Nike’s claim to own its logo – how can anyone own a tick?"
