= Helen Breger =

Austrian-born American visual artist (1918–2013)

- Born: Helen Hammermann; 1918; Vienna, Austria-Hungary (now Austria)
- Died: October 22, 2013 (aged 94–95); Berkeley, California, U.S.
- Other names: Helen Hamerman Breger, Helen Hamerman
- Education: Art Students League of New York, San Francisco State University, San Francisco Art Institute, California College of Arts and Crafts (MFA)
- Occupations: Printmaker, ceramist, draftsperson, illustrator, sculptor, watercolorist, educator
- Known for: Etching
- Spouse: Leonard Breger (divorced)
- Children: 2
- Mother: Esther Hamerman
- Awards: MacDowell Fellowship (1967)

Helen Breger (née Helen Hammermann; 1918 – 2013) was an Austrian-born American printmaker, ceramist, draftsperson, fashion illustrator, sculptor, and educator. She taught at the California College of Arts and Crafts (now California College of the Arts) in Oakland, California for over 30 years.

== Early life and education ==
Helen Hammermann was born in 1918, in Vienna, Austria-Hungary (now Austria), to Jewish parents Esther (née Waschmann) and Baruch Hammermann. Her mother was a Polish-born folk art painter, under the name Esther Hamerman. Her sister Juana Nadja Merino–Kalfel (also known as Nadja Kalfel), was a noted fashion illustrator and sculptor.

In 1938, after Anschluss when the Federal State of Austria into the Nazi German Reich, the Hammermann family fled to Trinidad, and were interred by the British for six years. During the internment, Helen Hammermann worked as a fashion illustrator and modified her designs for the tropics in Trinidad. In 1944, the family was permitted to move to New York City. She was educated at the Art Students League of New York.

Helen married an American soldier named Leonard Breger, and they had two children. In 1950, the Breger family moved to San Francisco prior to divorcing. She continued her education at the San Francisco Art Institute; and received a M.F.A. degree in 1970 from the California College of Arts and Crafts (now California College of the Arts). She also attended classes at San Francisco State University.

== Career ==
From 1954 to 1960, Breger worked as a freelance illustrator for the San Francisco Chronicle. She would draw for the newspaper the newest fashions found in local luxury department stores such as I. Magnin and Joseph Magnin.

She taught drawing at the California College of Arts and Crafts (now California College of the Arts) in Oakland, California, from 1959 until 1988. She also taught drawing at the University of California, Berkeley in the environmental design department.

Breger was known for her drawings, etchings and aquatints. But she worked in many other mediums, including watercolor, ceramics, and bronze sculpture.

== Death and legacy ==
Breger grappled with liver cancer, and died on October 22, 2013, at her home in Berkeley, California.

She was the subject of the documentary Vienna in the Heavenlies (2012), by her daughter Michelle Shelfer.

Breger's work is in public collections, including the Fine Arts Museums of San Francisco, the Metropolitan Museum of Art, the Philadelphia Museum of Art, the Brooklyn Museum, and the Binghamton University Art Museum.

== Publications ==
- Breger, Helen (2008). Lines: A Sketched Life.
- Breger, Helen; Foley, Jack (2011). Sketches Poetical (artist book with CD).
