= Feminist Art Gallery =

Art gallery in Toronto, Ontario

Coordinates: 43.65372°N 79.39314°W

- Established: 2010
- Location: Toronto, Ontario, Canada
- Type: Art gallery, collective, museum
- Founders: Allyson Mitchell; Deirdre Logue

Feminist Art Gallery (or FAG) is an art gallery and collective based in Toronto, Ontario, described as a “geographical footprint” co-founded by artists Allyson Mitchell and Deirdre Logue in 2010.

== History ==
Allyson Mitchell and Deirdre Logue founded the Feminist Art Gallery (FAG) in 2010."

FAG provides a space for art exhibitions, and opportunities for artists who are emerging, and such as queer artists and people of color.

The gallery operates alternatively to traditional galleries in the sense that artists do not submit proposals, and Mitchell and Logue act as "feral curators", which means they look to friends and peers to suggest which artists to show. The art is also not for sale, rather the artists receive a fee from private donations raised through its "matronage program."

Their most notable project are a series of banners funded by the University of Brighton for an Exhibition called "Civil Partnerships-Queer & Feminist Art & Activism". The series of four banners made of crochet granny squares read: "WE CAN’T COMPETE", "WE WON’T COMPETE", "WE CAN’T KEEP UP", "WE WON’T KEEP DOWN". These slogans are central to FAG’s mandate in which they ask " "Why would you want to be a winner in this hierarchical structure?" and "How do we both resist and reconcile our participation in this oppressive system?"

FAG has collaborated with institutions such as San Francisco Museum of Modern Art, Tate Modern, and were the artists in residence in 2015 at the Art Gallery of Ontario. They have also done projects with the Whippersnapper Gallery, The Power Plant, The Gallery of York University, Access Gallery, and Artists Independent Archives.
