= Working Artists and the Greater Economy =

Activist group based in New York City

- Abbreviation: W.A.G.E.
- Formation: 2008
- Type: Nonprofit Organization
- Legal status: 501(c)(3)
- Purpose: activism
- Location: New York, USA
- Website: wageforwork.com

Working Artists and the Greater Economy (W.A.G.E.) is a New York-based activist group and non-profit organization whose stated advocacy mission is "to establish sustainable economic relationships between artists and the institutions that contract our labor, and to introduce mechanisms for self-regulation into the art field that collectively bring about a more equitable distribution of its economy".

W.A.G.E. was founded in 2008 with the writing of the wo/manifesto by a group of artists, performers, and independent curators in New York City. The group, which has included A.K. Burns, K8 Hardy, Lise Soskolne, and A.L. Steiner, grew out of a series of informal gatherings that evolved into a series of public meetings centering on issues of art and labor.

== History ==
Early activity focused on education and consciousness raising about economic inequity in the form of videos, open teach-ins, workshops, panel discussions and symposia at museums, galleries, conferences, festivals, schools, summits, and art fairs.

In 2010, W.A.G.E. narrowed its platform to focus on the regulated payment of artist fees by nonprofit arts organizations and museums. They also initiated the 2010 W.A.G.E. Artist Survey to gather data about the payment practices of New York City nonprofits.

In Fall 2010, New Museum curator, Lauren Cornell, invited W.A.G.E. to participate in the 2010-2011 group exhibition, 'Free'. W.A.G.E., identifying not as an art-making collective, but rather as an activist group, opted to participate by negotiating artist fees on behalf of everyone in the exhibition, marking the event as "the first experimental platform for W.A.G.E. Certification".

In 2011, W.A.G.E. received its 501c3 non-profit status and narrowed its focus to W.A.G.E. Certification, a voluntary certification program that publicly recognizes nonprofit institutions paying artist fees meeting a minimum payment standard.

In March 2011, W.A.G.E. formed a temporary research partnership with Artists Space. This partnership served as a cooperative platform for hosting series of public programs and developing W.A.G.E. Certification. The first in the series, "Feeling the Shape of the Arts Economy", took place at Artists Space on January 9, 2012, and was led by sociologist and economist Hans Abbing, author of Why Are Artists Poor: The Exceptional Economy of the Arts. Other symposia included, "Marion von Osten: Be Creative! With responses from Andrew Ross" on November 8, 2012. Artists Space also granted W.A.G.E. access to their financial history, thus facilitating the organization's first case study of artist fee payment practices.

In 2012, the results of the W.A.G.E. Artist Survey were released.

W.A.G.E. Certification was developed into a policy and regulatory tool in January 2014 at the 2014 W.A.G.E. Summit and was launched in October. Summit participants included: A.K. Burns, Howie Chen, Andrea Fraser, Alison Gerber, Stephanie Luce, Andrew Ross (sociologist), Lise Soskolne, Marina Vishmidt, and staff members of Artists Space. The Summit also marked the conclusion of W.A.G.E.'s Research Partnership with Artists Space.

== W.A.G.E. Artist Survey ==
The purpose of the W.A.G.E. Survey was to gather data about the economic experiences of artists exhibiting in non-profit exhibition spaces in New York City between 2005 and 2010. Launched on September 22, 2010, the survey remained open until May 1, 2011. It collected responses anonymously about forms of payment, compensation or reimbursement received by an artist for their participation in an exhibition, including information about installation expenses, shipping/transportation costs for works, material expenses and travel expenses, among other things. The results of the survey, released in 2012, found that 58 percent of the 577 survey respondents who exhibited with small, medium, and large non-profit arts institutions in New York’s five boroughs between 2005 and 2010 did not receive any form of payment, compensation, or reimbursement––including the coverage of any expenses.

== W.A.G.E. Certification ==
W.A.G.E. Certification is a voluntary program that publicly recognizes non-profit arts organizations demonstrating a commitment to ethical payment practices with the artists they contract. W.A.G.E. Certification mandates that artists be compensated for the content they provide for the programs of arts institutions, and that this compensation must meet a minimum payment standards, as defined by the W.A.G.E. Fee Calculator.

The initiative is closely modeled after the Canadian Artists' Representation/Le Front des artistes Canadiens (CARFAC) Minimum Fee Schedule, and advocates for many of the same bottom-up tactics for shifting the relations between artists and institutions. However, unlike CARFAC, which has support from the Canadian government through the provision of the Exhibition Right in the Copyright Act, W.A.G.E.'s model has no state supported mandate, and currently relies on organizations opting in or on large groups of artists opting out of working with arts organizations that aren't W.A.G.E. certified.

=== Definitions & Requirements ===
W.A.G.E. Certification advocates for hyper definition and clarity, and has set definitions and requirements for the following: artist, non-profit arts organization, artist fee, basic programming costs and services, production costs, fee categories, and fee calculation.

==== Artist ====
Artist refers to "all those who supply content and services in a non-profit visual arts presenting context." No distinction is made between individual and collective/collaborative providers. W.A.G.E. does distinguish between the "contracted artist" and a "sub-contracted artist".

==== Non-Profit Arts Organization ====
Non-profit arts organization refers to a "501(c)3 tax exempt arts organization or institution that produces programs and exhibitions for a viewing public in a visual arts presenting context". Participating institutions could include 501(c)3 museums, advocacy organizations, professional societies, mid-size institutions, private foundations, artist-run initiatives, project spaces, independent websites, and publications.

==== Artist Fee ====
W.A.G.E. defines artistic labor as no different from other forms of subcontracted labor, and designates artist fees as compensation for content and services that are "distinct and separate from basic programming costs and services, production expenses, or the purchase of art works". In addition, the payment of artist fees does not imply the transfer of rights; must meet the minimum standard as determined by the W.A.G.E. fee calculator; and must be listed as its own distinct visible line item in an organization's exhibition and operating budgets.

==== Fee Categories ====
W.A.G.E. has identified fourteen categories of commonly supplied content or services: 1) Solo Exhibition, 2) Solo Project, 3) Two-Person Exhibition, 4) Group Exhibition, 3-5 Artists, 5) Group Exhibition, 6+ Artists, 6) Performance of Existing Work, 7) Performance, Commission of New Work, 8) Solo Screening with In-Person Appearance, 9) Event with 2 or More Participants, 10) Artist Talk or Reading, 11) Lecture, 12) Existing Text for Publication, 13) Commissioned Text for Publication, 14) Day Rate for Performers.

==== Fee Calculation ====
W.A.G.E. Certification's fee calculator is a model used to determine fair compensation for the fourteen fee categories. Fees are based on an organization’s total annual operating expenses (TAOE) and are broken down into three tiers:

- Floor W.A.G.E. - used to determine a minimum wage for organizations with TAOE below $500,000.
- Minimum W.A.G.E. - used to determine a rate for organizations with TAOE above $500,000.
- Maximum W.A.G.E. - used to determine a specified maximum rate, or cap, for organizations with TAOE over $15,000,000.

=== Certified Organizations ===
- Artists Space, New York, NY
- Art League Houston, Houston, TX
- FD13, St Paul, MN
- ISSUE Project Room, New York, NY
- The Artist's Institute, New York, NY
- Institute of Contemporary Art, Philadelphia, Philadelphia, PA
- Primary Information, Brooklyn, NY
- Rose Art Museum at Brandeis University, Waltham, MA
