= Allyson Mitchell =

Canadian artist (born 1967)

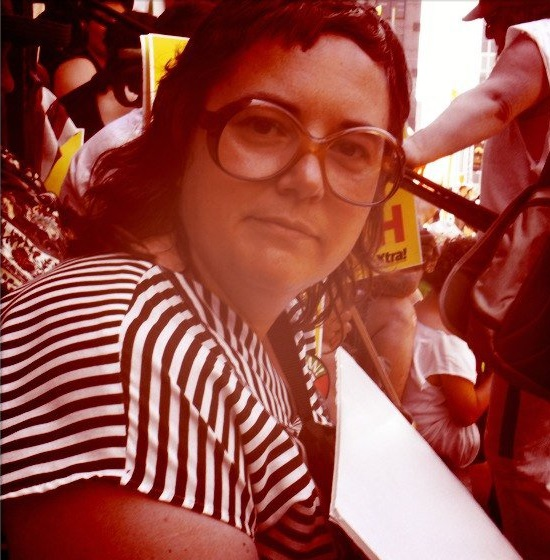
- Born: 1967 (age 58–59); Scarborough, Ontario, Canada
- Education: York University
- Known for: Sculptor, installation artist, filmmaker
- Movement: Maximalism
- Partner: Deirdre Logue

Allyson Mitchell is a Toronto-based maximalist artist, working predominantly in sculpture, installation and film. Her practice melds feminism and pop culture to trouble contemporary representations of women, sexuality and the body largely through the use of reclaimed textile and abandoned craft. Throughout her career, Mitchell has critiqued socio-historical phobias of femininity, feminine bodies and colonial histories, as well as ventured into topics of consumption under capitalism, queer feelings, queer love, fat being, fatphobia, genital fears and cultural practices. Her work is rooted in a Deep Lez methodology, which merges lesbian feminism with contemporary queer politics.

Mitchell is based in Toronto, where she is an assistant professor in the School of Gender, Sexuality and Women's Studies at York University.

== Early life and education ==
She received her three degrees from York University: her B.A. in Women Studies and English (1995); her M.A. in Women Studies (1998); and her Ph.D. in Women Studies (2006). Mitchell's Ph.D. thesis constructed a feminist theory of body geography, looking at the ways in which our body image shifts in different contexts.

== Works ==
In 1996, Mitchell cofounded the fat activist and performance art collective, Pretty Porky and Pissed Off with Ruby Rowan and Mariko Tamaki.

In 2010, Mitchell cofounded Feminist Art Gallery with Deirdre Logue.

For her work Kill Joy's Kastle, Mitchell created a lesbian feminist haunted house. She is represented by Katherine Mulherin Contemporary Art.

Her works have exhibited in galleries and festivals across Canada, the US and Europe, including Tate Modern, the Textile Museum of Canada, the Museum of Contemporary Canadian Art, the Andy Warhol Museum, Walker Art Center, The British Film Institute, Winnipeg Art Gallery, the Art Gallery of Ontario and the ONE National Gay & Lesbian Archives.

Work as co-editor

Karaian, Lara (2001). Rundle, Lisa Bryn; Mitchell, Allyson (eds.). Turbo Chicks: Talking Young Feminisms. Toronto: Sumach Press. ISBN 978-1-894549-06-6. OCLC 46629305.

=== Ladies Sasquatch ===
Mitchell’s Ladies Sasquatch is an ongoing project that has taken up various forms. It foregrounds six mythical "she-beast" sculptures, made of synthetic fur and colourful textiles and reaching heights of up to eleven feet. The fuzzy, humanoid creatures are depicted gathered around a campfire, positioned in unique poses, with hairy breasts, nipples and vulvas on prominent display. Each has been given a name by Mitchell, including Silverback, Tawny, Bunny, Oxana, Maxy and Midge. They are accompanied by a family of "familiars": tiny, strange-looking mammals taxidermized in cotton-candy-pink fur. According to Mitchell, Lady Sasquatch is "your dream girl, only bigger and hairier- and she might eat you if you don’t look out!".

Indigenous folklore about the "Sasquatch", or Big Foot (as it is often referred to in settler colonial states) has long been appropriated by the white Canadian mainstream. This appropriation can be understood as an expression of the racist fears around the "otherness" of Indigenous culture, and of nature. Ladies Sasquatch, then, has been interpreted by some as a commentary on the Indigenous myth of Sasquatch and the racist symbolic implications it has for settler colonial states, through which Mitchell re-imagines the myth through a decolonized and radical feminist lens. The giantesses both represent nature and do not exist apart from it. Ultimately, viewers may see the "Sasquatch" in Mitchell's work as a figure embodying sexist tropes of queer bodies in regard to femininity's ties to nature, through which Mitchell deliberately blurs the Western binaries imposed between nature and culture, man and woman, and celebrates queer feminist identity.

"Fiercely animalistic", Mitchell’s sculptures are constructed with taxidermic parts like shining glass eyes, wet-looking black nostrils and pointed claws, their mouths open to reveal bright pink tongues and long, gleaming white teeth. Still, there is a playfulness and humour to the work, with certain textiles being used by Mitchell to evoke senses of nostalgia and familiarity rooted in memories of home and childhood. This comforting quality invites the viewer into a physical relationship with the sculptures, whom they are encouraged to join by the campfire, to interact with, and to touch. "People walk in here, and they become part of this circle… implicated in the lesbian feminist separatist politics, regardless of gender" (Allyson Mitchell, interview).

Mitchell's use of textiles in making the pieces also works to disrupt Western, masculinized perceptions of art, specifically those surrounding sculpture as a medium: "the association of textiles with feminist practice works to trouble the viewer's expectations of massive sculpture". In her fabrication of Ladies Sasquatch, Mitchell simultaneously mocks and subverts the masculinity often associated with sculpture and other such fundaments of Western art. Rather than using the cold stone or metal typical to conventional sculptures that tend to be showcased in traditional art spaces, she purposefully selects textured, tactile, tufted and woven fibers with which to build the figures of Ladies Sasquatch. In doing so, Mitchell creates a sensorium that allows for the celebration of the radical politics of lesbian sexuality and community building.

When encountering Ladies Sasquatch, the viewer is invited into a bizarre, beautiful and undeniably erotic world, rich with texture, humour and joyful displays of femininity, queerness and desire. The size, strength and fierceness of the exclusively female collective in Ladies Sasquatch suggest a social order that exists beyond the patriarchal status quo, and a rejection of male-dominated urban civilization. In many ways, the work appears to represent a queer utopia, in which the inhabitants live free of the heteropatriarchal male gaze and instead enjoy a space both created and populated by "unbridled feminine energy". There is also a mythical element to this gathering; in her review of the installation, curator Carla Garnet notes that the figures seem to be enacting a "modern yet primordial" re-interpretation of Aristophanes' Lysistrata, pointing to the pieces' shared interrogating of the social organization of mythological feminine power. As well, Garnet suggests that the fabrication process of the piece provides a model for the building of queer feminist communities, a theme common among Mitchell's other works. Through an exploration of themes such as lesbian feminism, sexuality, queer kinship and community building, Ladies Sasquatch provides a site within which patriarchal understandings are disrupted, and public space is reclaimed for radical lesbian experience.

=== A Girl's Journey Into the Well of Forbidden Knowledge ===
A Girl’s Journey into the Well of Forbidden Knowledge was a 2010 installation for the Art Gallery of Ontario in Toronto, in which Mitchell recreated a version of the Lesbian Herstory Archives reading room in Brooklyn. The work, inspired by Mitchell’s time spent at the Archives while living in New York, brought lesbian feminist history and culture to a larger public by transforming the gallery space into a lesbian feminist library. One wall is lined with reproductions of drawings made to document and honour the books in the Archives' holdings. The installation pays homage not only to the Lesbian Herstory Archives, but to all feminist presses, bookstores and libraries that advocate for the significance of women's stories, histories and acts of resistance. The drawings also serve to memorialize the disappearing history of material texts that have long connected queer communities, as women's publishers and bookstores ("essential meeting places for lesbians, and for all women") become lost in the digital age.

The sculptures in the installation, made from paper mâché worked over mannequins, are "imposing in size, humorous in disposition and completely exposed in their nudity". They represent archivists, librarians, students and readers. Their exaggerated genitalia, like much of Mitchell’s other work, brings the private to the public and interrogates idealized and unrealistic depictions of nude women in the media. The two hold hands but are turned from each other to face the shelves. They are also attached via crochet ropes that link their crotches to a giant crochet brain overhead, suggesting the intertwining of sexual and intellectual desire in their love for books and each other.

=== Kill Joy's Kastle ===
Kill Joy’s Kastle: A Lesbian Feminist Haunted House was a large scale, multiroom, multimedia and immersive piece created by Allyson Mitchell and Deirdre Logue in collaboration with over a hundred artists and performers. Kill Joy’s Kastle was first installed in the fall of 2013 in Toronto. It was also displayed in London, Los Angeles and Philadelphia in the following years.

In creating Kill Joy’s Kastle, Mitchell and Logue drew on the form of Evangelical Christian Hell Houses, which act out scenes of perceived sins such as homosexuality, abortion, drug use and suicide in an attempt to steer viewers (often teenagers) toward the path of Evangelical Christianity. Employing a performance similar to those seen in traditional Hell Houses, Kill Joy’s Kastle leads audience members through a dramatized retelling of lesbian feminist "herstory", designed to "pervert, not convert" its viewers. The installation was simultaneously utopic and dystopic, advertised as a "sex positive, trans inclusive, queer-lesbian-feminist-fear-fighting celebration".

At the beginning of the tour, audiences are introduced to the figure of the "feminist killjoy", who explains that while feminists are often depicted as "happiness murderesses", their "bad mood" is more than understandable after "millennium upon millennium of persecution, ridicule, erasure and abject misunderstanding". This stereotype of the "feminist killjoy" functions as a starting point for the installation's interrogation of heteropatriarchal depictions of lesbian feminism. Throughout the rest of the tour, audience members are led through the world of Kill Joy’s Kastle, in which they encounter the queered resurrection of "Dead" theories, ideas, movements and stereotypes such as "Riot Ghouls", "Paranormal Consciousness Raisers", "Zombie Folk Singers", "Ball Busting Butches", "Four Faced Internet Trolls", and "Polyamorous Vampiric Grannies". An emotionally immersive and embodied space created with Mitchell's signature maximalist style and rooted in a "Deep Lez" philosophy (see "Themes" section of this article), the installation uses humor and discomfort to engage audience members, disrupt mainstream discourse surrounding lesbianism and feminism and challenge narratives of liberal process.

Kill Joy’s Kastle’s first iteration in Toronto yielded a large and contentious reaction from viewers, many of whom felt that the installation was white-centric and transphobic, highlighting tensions within lesbian and queer communities. After the show, a young artist and blogger named Kalmplex critiqued the whiteness of the show, arguing that the installation put white lesbian history at the forefront and excluded the experiences of Black and racialized lesbians. Another community member voiced concerns about the transphobia of the "Ball Busta's" portion of the installation. Mitchell apologized directly to the individuals who had negative experiences with the installation in a public letter, in which she took personal responsibility and situated the project in the racist and transphobic histories of lesbian feminism. Changes to the show were made to the LA installation in response to the Toronto controversy.

== Themes ==
=== Deep Lez ===
Mitchell’s work is rooted in the collective feelings surrounding feminism and lesbian feminism. In 2009, Mitchell published a manifesto for this methodology, titled "Deep Lez I Statement". Through its merging of elements of lesbian feminism and contemporary intersectional queer politics, Deep Lez functions as a queer critique of lesbian feminism’s gender essentialism, transphobia, and whiteness. In doing so, it attempts to create a "both/and" sensibility that embraces multiple histories and perspectives. Deep Lez was conceptualized by Mitchell as an "experiment, a process, an aesthetic, and a blend of theory and practice which aims to acknowledge and address histories of conflict and erasure in feminist and queer movements". It serves as a guiding philosophy and methodology for Mitchell as an artist, and a framework through which to understand the broader implications of her work. Described by Mitchell as a "macraméd conceptual tangle", Deep Lez questions how art and politics integrate, and acknowledges contemporary queer and feminist movements' need to "develop inclusive liberatory feminisms while examining strategic benefits of maintaining some components of a radical lesbian theory and practice". Deep Lez is embodied through an ongoing series of artworks by Mitchell that reappropriate public space for radical, political lesbian identity.

=== Craft as Queer and Feminist Resistance ===
Mitchell is one of a few contemporary artists using craft as a largely unregulated site of protest and feminist resistance. Crafting, which has long played a vital role in the social and communal sphere, has been taken up by various artists as a tool of queer and feminist resistance with which to "unpick and unravel the very binaries between high/low, art/craft, male/female". Through her frequent use of textured and tactile fibres through which to celebrate lesbian feminism, sexuality and kinship, Mitchell's work creates a site of transformation, embodiment and power. This use of craft as a mode of subversion, resistance and worldbuilding can be contextualized within larger feminist legacies of craft. Many artists engaged in the second-wave feminist movement worked to exploit the longstanding relationship between craft and gender, using craft as a "weapon of resistance". This was marked by the revolution of what became known as "fiber art". Fiber artists recognized categories such as "soft art" or "soft sculpture" as modes through which to merge the divide between art and craft. Today, the practice of crafting has been taken up as an essential part of queer-feminist survival. This use of craft is evident in Mitchell's work, in which she uses textiles as a means of worldmaking and the subversion of heteropatriarchal norms surrounding gender and sexuality.

== Collections ==
Agnes Etherington Art Gallery, Queen's University, Kingston, Ontario
National Library and Archives, Ottawa, Ontario
Trent University, Peterborough Ontario
Carleton University, Ottawa Ontario
McMaster University, Hamilton Ontario
