= Mobilivre =

The MOBILIVRE-BOOKMOBILE project is a community arts initiative founded by the Bookmobile collective, a diverse group of emerging North American artists and community activists. Their mandate is to fuse artistic production with political activism and community organizing. The collective consists of a fluctuating group of dedicated volunteers, coordinators, jury organizers, and tour guides. Although the project is based primarily in Montreal, QC, and Philadelphia, PA, collective members reside in various cities throughout North America.

The MOBILIVRE-BOOKMOBILE project explores the long-held tradition of bookmobiles as traveling libraries in order to promote the distribution of information. Since 2000, the project has been selectively collecting and organizing artist's books (that range from handmade and one-of-a-kind pieces, to zines, photocopied works, and other independent publications) on an annual basis. Members of the collective present these works to the public in a series of traveling exhibitions that are held throughout the United States and Canada with the help of a vintage Airstream trailer. The artist collective also organizes workshops and participates in educational activities on a community level during these tours. As one example, co-founder Ginger Brooks Takahashi gave bookbinding workshops on tour.

Each touring collection consists of about 300 items. In 2005, the collective donated its 2000-2005 collections to Artexte Information Centre. This not-for-profit arts organization maintains the collections and provides on-site access to them. Artexte also provides further access to these collections with an electronic guide to individual works, organized by touring year: Projet MOBILIVRE-BOOKMOBILE Project Guide

The project ended in 2006. The collective sold the trailer to the Black Fly anarchist collective. In August 2014, The Bookmobile Book was published about the project, including essays, photographs, comics, and selections from the books and zines that were part of the project.
