= K8 Hardy =

American artist and filmmaker

- Born: Kate Hardy; October 27, 1977 (age 48); Fort Worth, Texas, U.S.
- Education: Bard College; Smith College
- Known for: Video Art, Feminist Art, Photography, Sculpture, Fashion

K8 Hardy (born 1977, Fort Worth, Texas) is an American artist and filmmaker. Hardy's work spans painting, sculpture, video, and photography and her work has been exhibited internationally at the Whitney Museum of American Art, Tate Modern, Tensta Konsthall, Karma International, and the Dallas Contemporary. Hardy's work is included in the permanent collections of the Whitney Museum of American Art, the Solomon R. Guggenheim Museum, and the Museum of Modern Art. She is a founding member of the queer feminist artist collective and journal LTTR. She lives and works in New York, New York.

== Early life and education ==
Hardy was born on October 27, 1977, in Fort Worth, Texas. Hardy uses the moniker "K8" as shorthand for her first name which she adopted while publishing zines in high school.

She attended Smith College, in Northampton, Massachusetts, and graduated with a degree in film and feminist/queer theory in 2000. She studied video with Elisabeth Subrin through the Five College Consortium. Later, she worked alongside Miranda July and the Northwest Film Center in Portland, Oregon.

In 2003, she studied at the Whitney Museum of American Art Independent Study Program in 2003 alongside other artists like Ulrike Mueller and Lisa Oppenheim.

Hardy went on to receive an MFA from the Milton Avery Graduate School of the Arts at Bard College in 2008.

== Work ==
In 2001, K8 Hardy co-founded LTTR, a genderqueer feminist art collective in New York. The collective's co-creators include Ginger Brooks Takahashi and Emily Roysdon, and, in 2005, Ulrike Müller joined the collective. LTTR's mission centered on "highlighting the work of radical communities whose goals are sustainable change, queer pleasure, and critical feminist productivity." LTTR first began as a journal and eventually expanded to include live events, screenings, collaborations, read-ins, and workshops.

Hardy started a color-photocopy zine, FashionFashion, in 2002. FashionFashion depicted Hardy styled in second-hand clothing. The zine morphed into a solo exhibition of four oversized books exhibited at Higher Pictures Generation in 2014 and Reena Spaulings Fine Art in 2019. Writer Andrew Durbin has noted that the zine is somewhere between avant couture and "riot grrrlesque" and features various self-portraits alongside handwritten musings on ghosts.

From 2002 to 2007, Hardy and Greenwood created? New Report. The piece featured both artists playing female newscasters for a fictional radio show, WKRH, and reporting on the news. Both artists, clad in berets, trench coats, and turtlenecks, touch upon subjects such as '60s and '70s feminism, queer politics, and mental health through various different activities: burning bras, in-depth interviews, and various news reports utilizing a giant pink microphone.

In 2004, Hardy performed Beautiful Radiating Energy, at Reena Spaulings. In the performance piece, Hardy stretched and exercised in front of a projected video while chanting: "I am happy; I am here; I am hurt. I'm ready!" This was the artist's first performance piece in New York. Video footage included images of Hardy's friend Math walking away from the camera, found footage of reactions to the burial of Baader-Meinhof terrorists, gay rights parades, and body building competitions. In 2017, Hardy re-staged the performance at Participant Inc. with artist Raúl de Nieves as the performer.

In 2007, Hardy and Greenwood performed New Report Live at the Tate Modern in London. That same year, Hardy performed Bare Life with the musician and sound artist Stefan Tcherepnin. As inspiration for the piece, both artists responded to texts by Giorgio Agamben that revolved around his concept of Bare Life.

Hardy became a founding member of Working Artists and the Greater Economy, or W.A.G.E, in 2008. W.A.G.E. was founded by the artists A.L. Steiner, A.K. Burns, ginger brooks takahashi, and is a nonprofit organization and activist group that aims "to establish sustainable economic relationships between artists and the institutions that contract our labor, and to introduce mechanisms for self-regulation into the art field that collectively bring about a more equitable distribution of its economy."

In 2010, the artist created a capsule collection, titled J'APPROVE, produced by artist Travis Boyer for the 2011 JF & Son pop-up shop in New York.

Hardy exhibited several sculptures and photographs in the 2012 Whitney Biennial. Alongside the sculptures and photographs, Hardy organized a performance called Untitled Runway Show on the exhibition's fourth-floor. The performance included live models on a catwalk wearing anti-couture outfits designed by Hardy. The set design was by Oscar Tuazon and the music was by Venus X.

In 2016, Hardy premiered her first feature-length film, Outfitumentary. Outfitumentary is a documentary .... collection of self-portrait videos shot over ten years on a miniature DV camera from 2001 to 2011 and was premiered in 2016 at the Museum of Modern Art and at the International Film Festival Rotterdam.

In 2020, Hardy exhibited a single ten-foot-long green, yellow, and pink-colored painting, resembling a maxi pad, at Reena Spaulings New York. Johanna Fateman selected the piece as one of her favorite artworks from 2020. Critic Sarah Nicole Prickett and artist Nicole Eisenman have compared the work to a painting as sculpture and sculpture as painting similar to Claes Oldenburg's early soft sculptures, Frank Stella's objects, and Jackson Pollock's Cut-Out (1948–1950).

== Selected exhibitions ==
=== Solo exhibitions ===
- 2020, A NEW PAINTING, Reena Spaulings, New York, New York
- 2017, K8 Hardy: Undergirding Heroine Ensemble, The Barn, Tivoli, New York
- 2016, Docudrama, Reena Spaulings Fine Art, Los Angeles, California
- 2016, Aunt Margie, Company, New York
- 2015, NEW CUTS K8 HARDY, University of California, Irvine
- 2014, YDRAH 8K, Künstlerhaus Halle fur Kunst & Medien, Graz, Austria
- 2011, K8 Hardy, Galerie BaliceHertling, Paris, France
- 2010, FeminismFormalism, Galerie Sonja Junkers, Munich, Germany
- 2010, Freeing the Natural Voice, on the Perpetual Horizon of Devastation, Some Notes on Lying, Hard Hat, Geneva, Switzerland
- 2009, Position Series, Reena Spaulings Fine Art, New York, New York
- 2005, New Report (collaboration with Wynne Greenwood), Reena Spaulings Fine Art, New York, New York

=== Group exhibitions ===
- 2020 Photography and the Surreal Imagination, The Menil Collection, Houston, US
- 2019 Fire, Company Gallery, New York, US
- 2018 Tag: Proposals on Queer Play and the Ways Forward, ICA Philadelphia, Philadelphia, US
- 2018, Fashion Drive. Extreme Clothing in the Visual Arts, Kunsthaus Zürich, Zürich, CH
- 2016, Outfitumentary, Museum of Modern Art, New York, New York
- 2015, Outfitumentary, Reena Spaulings Fine Art, New York, New York
- 2012, Whitney Biennial, Whitney Museum of American Art, New York, New York
- 2010, Greater New York, MoMA PS1, Queens, New York
- 2010, Fluorescent Adolescent, Schunck: Biennial of Photography and Visual Arts, Heerlen, The Netherlands
- 2010, 50 Artists Photograph the Future, Higher Pictures, New York, New York
- 2009, Reflections on Electric Mirror: New Feminist Video, Brooklyn Museum, New York

== Selected screenings ==
- 2018, Outfitumentary, Boston University, Boston, Massachusetts, US
- 2016, Outfitumentary, International of Contemporary Arts, London, England, Outfitumentary, Outfest, Los Angeles, California, Outifitumentary, T-Mobile New Horizons International Film Festival, Poland, Outfitumentary, International Film Festival of Rotterdam, Official Selection, Outfitumentary, Doc Fortnight, The Museum of Modern Art, New York, New York, Outfitumentary, FIT, New York, New York
- 2016, Grrrl Germs: A Visual History of Riot Grrrl, (Mark Lukenbill) Spectacle, Brooklyn, New York
- 2015, Outfitumentary, Advanced Screening, Pop Montreal, Montreal, Canada
- 2008, Video Art and Film by K8 Hardy, Light Industry, New York, New York
- 2005, Promiscuous Cinema, Cinematheque at Yerba Buena Center for the Arts, San Francisco, California
- 2004, Basic Needs, Ms. Film Festival, Durham, NC
- 2003, Almost Paradise, New York Underground Film Festival, New York, New York
- 2003, Swans and Eunuchs, Wexner Center for the Arts, Columbus, OH
- 2003, K8 Hardy, Robert Beck Memorial Cinema, New York, New York
- 2003, Works by K8 Hardy, Film Casino, Vienna, Austria (curated by Ulrike Muller)
- 2003, Peripheral Produce, Northwest Film Center, Portland Art Museum, Portland, OR
- 2003, Caution: Open Flame, Flaming Film Festival, Minneapolis, MN
- 2003, The Platinum Tapes, Ocularis, Brooklyn, New York (curated by Lauren Cornell)
- 2003, Video Marathon, Art in General, New York, New York
- 2003, Chicago Underground Film Festival, Chicago, Illinois

== Selected performances ==
- 2017, Beautiful Radiating Energy with Raúl de Nieves (organized by Rhea Anastas), Participant Inc, New York, New York
- 2013, Performance, Kunstverein Graz
- 2010, New Paintings, Reena Spaulings Fine Art, New York, New York (curated by Pati Hertling)
- 2010, Evas Arche und der Feminist, Artists Space, New York, New York
- 2007, New Report Live: Bankside Power Station, The Tate Modern, London, UK; with Wynne Greenwood Bare Life, Reena Spaulings Fine Art, New York, New York
- 2006, New Report, Hayward Gallery with London Lesbian and Gay Film Festival, London, UK
- 2004, Beautiful Radiating Energy, Reena Spaulings Fine Art, New York, New York
- 2004, Beautiful Radiating Energy West Coast Tour, Artists' Television Access, San
- 2004, Francisco, California Experimental Media for Feminist Trespass, Pilot Television, Chicago, Illinois

== Public Collections ==
- LUMA foundation collection, Zürich, CH
- Museum of Modern Art, New York, US
- Whitney Museum of Art, New York, US
- Fiorruci Art Trust
- Deutsche Bank Headquarters, Frankfurt, DE

== Artist's publications and text ==
- 2018, "K8 Hardy," Artist's Projects, ArtForum, January 2018
- 2016, Queer, "K8 Hardy, Amifesto 2006" editor David Getsy, Whitechapel Gallery and MIT Press
- 2014, K8 HARDY/YDRAH, 8K editor Christian Eggerer
- 2013, How To: Untitled Runway Show D.O.P.E. Press
- 2013, Next Time, "Dear Reena Spaulings Fine Art" ed. Geer, David and Pool, Isaac, Macie Gransion and Envoy Enterprises
- 2011, Frank Peter John Dick by K8 Hardy; essay Eileen Myles (New York: Capricious Publishing, 2011)
- 2011, Mousse Magazine, "Andrea Dworkin" No. 28 April 2011
- 2011, Useless, "The Angst of Commerce", p15, ed. Conrad Ventur (New York: 2010)
- 2010, Useless, "The Angst of Commerce" No. 10 December 2010, p15
- 2009, Sessions/Zeitschrift, "Re-working the In-Between, Shaking It Out." May 2009, No. 17, pp 31–34
- 2009, Company, "Advertisement, Performance, Style, and Authenticity" pp138–144, ed. Meghan DellaCrosse, Fawn Krieger, and Claire Sexton, (New York: Art In General, 2009)
- 2009, Sessions/Zeitschrift, "Re-working the In-Between, Shaking It Out." May 2009, Ausgabe 17, pp 31–34, ed. Christian Egger and Christian Mayer, Vienna
- 2008, Queer Zines, Ed. AA Bronson and Philip Aarons, "Fashionfashion" pp90–91 and "LTTR" pp154–155, (New York: Printed matter, Inc., 2008)
- 2008, Artforum, "The Artists' Artists" December 2008, XLVII, No.4, p99
- Fashionfashion, Artist Book Project, Issues 1-5 (2004–present)
- North Drive Press, "K8 Hardy and Ulrike Mueller" Issue 3 (New York: Matt Keegan and Sara Greenberger Rafferty, 2006)
- 2006, Ridykeulous, Issue 1, p. 7 (New York: Nicole Eisenman and A.L. Steiner, 2006)
- 2005, Arts & Leisure, Co-Editor (New York: Art in General, 2005)
- 2005, Untitled, "Artist Project: K8 Hardy" Autumn 2005, No. 36, pp50–51 (London: ed. Mario Flecha and Olivia Plender)
- 2004, Fashionfashion, Issues 1-5 (2004–present)
