= Esther Hamerman =

American painter (1886–1977)

- Born: Esther Wachsmann; September 21, 1886; Wieliczka, Poland
- Died: 1977 (aged 90–91); New York City, New York, U.S.
- Known for: Painting
- Movement: Folk art

Esther Hamerman (born Esther Wachsmann; 1886–1977) was a Polish-born American painter. Hamerman, who was self-taught, has been described as a "leading practitioner" of memory painting. She is considered a folk artist.

== Early life ==
Esther was born in 1886 in Wieliczka, Poland into a Jewish family. She had thirteen siblings. By the age of 18 she was married. She had four children, and the family lived in Vienna, Austria.

In 1938, the family fled Vienna because of the Anschluss, the annexation of the Federal State of Austria into the German Reich. For six years the family lived in a British internment camp in Trinidad.

== Immigration to the United States and career ==
In 1944 the Hamerman family was released from the camp and moved to New York City. Esther started painting after moving to New York City. Her daughter Helen Breger and her husband, Leonard, supported Hamerman's career and submitted a painting of hers to an exhibition at ACA Galleries. That exhibition was her "big break" into the art world.

Hamerman's husband died in 1950. As a result, she relocated with her daughter and son-in-law to San Francisco, where she continued to paint. She lived in San Francisco for 12 years.

== Later life ==
She moved back to New York City in 1963, where she lived with her other daughter, Nadja Merino-Kalfel. She died in 1977 in New York City.

Her great-granddaughter is artist Nicole Eisenman.

== Collections ==
- "Untitled (East River)", after 1950, oil on canvas; Smithsonian American Art Museum
