= Every Ocean Hughes =

American artist (born 1977)

Every Ocean Hughes (born 1977), formerly known as Emily Roysdon, is a multimedia interdisciplinary artist based in New York and Stockholm. They also work as a writer and currently hold the position of Professor of Art at Konstfack in Stockholm, Sweden. Hughes employs various mediums such as performance, photography, printmaking, text, and video. Hughes curates and collaborates to express their artistic vision.

== Education ==
Hughes was an undergraduate at Hampshire College, from which they graduated in 1999. In 2002, they completed the Independent Study Program at the Whitney Museum of American Art. Hughes received an MFA in Interdisciplinary Studio from the University of California, Los Angeles in 2006.

== LTTR ==
In 2002, Hughes helped as a co-founder of the feminist genderqueer artist collective and annual literary journal Lesbians To The Rescue (LTTR), which remained an active part of the queer art theory community until 2008, along with Ginger Brooks Takahashi and K8 Hardy. LTTR was dedicated to "highlighting the work of radical communities whose goals are sustainable change, queer pleasure, and critical feminist productivity."

== Ecstatic resistance ==
Hughes developed the concept of "ecstatic resistance" in 2009 to talk about the impossible and imaginary in politics. In their essay on the topic, Hughes says, "Ecstatic Resistance is a project, practice, partial philosophy and set of strategies. It develops the positionality of the impossible alongside a call to re-articulate the imaginary. Ecstatic Resistance is about the limits of representation and legibility — the limits of the intelligible, and strategies that undermine hegemonic oppositions. It wants to talk about pleasure in the domain of resistance — sexualizing modern structures to centralize instability and plasticity in life, living, and the self. It is about waiting, and the temporality of change. Ecstatic Resistance wants to think about all that is unthinkable and unspeakable in the Eurocentric, phallocentric world order." In addition to their essay being published in Grand Arts and Toronto's C Magazine, the project also was inclusive of a "practice, partial philosophy, set of strategies, and group exhibition(s)" that were all organized and curated by Hughes.

The two simultaneous sister shows were exhibited at Grand Arts (Nov. 13 - Jan. 16, 2010) and X Initiative in NYC (Nov. 21 - Feb. 6, 2010) and incorporated the art and performance of Yael Bartana, Sharon Hayes, Matthew Lutz-Kinoy, My Barbarian, Jeanine Oleson, Ulrike Ottinger, Adrian Piper, Dean Spade and Craig Willse, A.L. Steiner, Rosa Barba, Juan Davila, Xylor Jane, My Barbarian in collaboration with Liudni Slibinai, Ulrike Muller, A.L. Steiner, Joyce Wieland, Leah Gilliam, Julianna Snapper, PIG/ Politically Involved Girls (Wu Ingrid Tsang, Zackary Drucker, and Mariana Marroquin), and Ian White. The New York Times' Roberta Smith wrote that "Ms. Roysdon's title connotes a spirit of Zen activism, with absurdity substituting for ideology, but with politics still in the picture."

== Other collaborations ==
Hughes's many other collaborations include costume design for choreographers Levi Gonzalez, Vanessa Anspaugh and Faye Driscoll, as well as lyric writing for The Knife, and JD Samson & MEN.

== Solo projects ==
Recent solo projects include Help the Dead (2019), scenic, say (Kunsthalle Lissabon, Lisbon, 2017), Comedy of Margin Theatre (Secession, Vienna, 2015), and Uncounted (2014-17).

== Art showings and festivals ==
Hughes's work has been featured in solo exhibitions at Kunsthalle Lissabon, Lisbon (2017), Secession, Vienna (2015), Participant Inc., New York (2015), and the Berkeley Art Museum (2010).

Their work has also been featured in the 11th Gwangju Biennale, South Korea (2016), the Biennale of Sydney (2014), the Whitney Biennial, New York (2010), and Manifesta 8, Murcia, Spain (2010), as well as in group exhibits at Museu Serralves, Porto, Portugal (2017), Kunst-Werke Institute for Contemporary Art, Berlin (2016), the Museum of Modern Art, New York (2014), Moderna Museet, Malmö, Sweden (2014), Institute of Contemporary Art, Boston (2011), and the Museo Nacional Centro de Arte Reina Sofía, Madrid (2010).

== Grants and awards ==
Hughes completed the Whitney Museum Independent Study Program in 2001 and an Interdisciplinary MFA at UCLA in 2006. They have received grants and residencies from the Rema Hort Mann Foundation (2010), Franklin Furnace (2009), Wexner Center for the Arts (2009), Art Matters (2008), the International Artists Studio Program in Sweden (IASPIS, 2008), and the Hammer Museum (2018-2019). In 2012 Hughes was a finalist for the Future Generation Art Prize.

Hughes is currently a Mary I Bunting Fellow at the Radcliffe Institute for Advanced Study.

== Works in permanent collections ==
- The New York Public Library's Miriam and Ira D. Wallach Division of Art, Prints, and Photographs
- The Museum of Modern Art, New York
