= Robert Zend =

Hungarian-Canadian poet, writer, and artist

- Born: 1929; Budapest, Kingdom of Hungary
- Died: 27 June 1985 (aged 55–56); Toronto, Canada
- Education: University of Toronto
- Writing career
- Genres: Poetry; Short story

Robert Zend (1929 – 1985) was a Hungarian-Canadian poet, fiction writer and a multimedia artist.

Born in Budapest, Zend fled to Canada after the failed Hungarian Uprising of 1956. He took a master's degree in Italian literature from the University of Toronto in 1969, and worked as a producer of Ideas documentaries for CBC Radio.

His poetry collections included From Zero to One (1973), Beyond Labels (1982) and Arbormundi (1982); Oāb, was published in two separate volumes in 1983 and 1985. A short story collection, Daymares: Selected Fictions on Dreams and Time, was published posthumously in 1991.

Zend was part of a trilogy of Toronto poets who published with HMS Press et al. The Three Roberts with Robert Sward and Robert Priest in 1984.
