= LTTR =

LTTR is a feminist genderqueer collective with a flexible project oriented practice. LTTR was founded in 2001 by Ginger Brooks Takahashi, K8 Hardy and Emily Roysdon. LTTR produces a performance series, events, screenings and collaborations. It also released five issues of an annual independent art journal between 2002 and 2006.

== Philosophy and practice ==
The collective is rooted in community and collaborative processes without hierarchy. LTTR is a shifting acronym; it started in 2001 as "Lesbians to the Rescue" and has since stood for phrases ranging from "Lacan Teaches to Repeat" to "Let's Take the Role." LTTR is dedicated to highlighting the work of radical communities whose goals are sustainable change, queer pleasure, and critical feminist productivity.

In contrast to more dogmatic approaches to identity, LTTR takes a more fluid and questioning approach to identity and authorship. It seeks to create and build a context for a culture of critical thinkers whose work not only speaks in dialogue with one another, but consistently challenges its own form by shifting shape and design to best respond to contemporary concerns. According to Holland Cotter of The New York Times, "The idea of moving art out of the control of the professional art world underlies the thinking of many of the individuals and collectives associated with LTTR." LTTR's members have also used their bands, poster projects, workshops and sit-ins as media for exploring the political possibilities of feminist pop-cultural influence.

== LTTR Journal ==
LTTR Journal was an annual publication with a zine aesthetic. It had five issues published from 2002 to 2006. The issues contained a curated selection of theory, essays, and images including photography, drawings and prints. The inaugural issue of the collective's art journal was entitled "Lesbians to the Rescue," followed by "Listen Translate Translate Record," "Practice More Failure," "Do You Wish to Direct Me?," and "Positively Nasty."

LTTR Journal was produced collectively by many young gay and lesbian artists and feminists. The editorial debates of LTTR and decision making surrounding the printed journal were based on the idea of making a significant contribution to contemporary feminist genderqueer concerns. It was edited by consensus in long-process editorial sessions. Each issue was initiated with an international open call and through interpersonal relationships from within their communities. Each submission was considered independently and in regards to the working themes of the journal. Each issue included handmade artists' multiples and was published in a print run of 1000 copies. Ulrike Müller joined LTTR in 2005 and Lanka Tattersal was an editor and collaborator for issue 4.

As their project expanded, LTTR exhibited the journal at venues including Artists Space in New York City, the Generali Foundation in Vienna, the Yerba Buena Center for the Arts in San Francisco, Los Angeles County Museum of Art and Documenta 12 in Kassel, Germany.
