= Deirdre Logue =

- Born: 1964 (age 61–62); Ottawa, Canada
- Education: BFA, Nova Scotia College of Art and Design; MFA, Kent State University
- Known for: Film and video artist
- Notable work: Enlightened Nonsense, 1997-2000
- Partner: Allyson Mitchell
- Website: deirdrelogue.com

Deirdre Logue (born 1964) is a Canadian video artist and arts administrator, based in Toronto, Ontario.

== Career ==
Deirdre Logue studied at the Nova Scotia College of Art and Design (BFA) and Kent State University (MFA). She has been creating film and video work since the 1990s. Her work has been exhibited at Plug In ICA (Winnipeg), Open Space (Victoria), Neutral Ground (Regina), Oakville Galleries, Beyond/In Western New York 2007 (Buffalo), the Berlin International Film Festival and ExiS Film Festival (Seoul). With Allyson Mitchell, Logue is a founding member of the Feminist Art Gallery, artists in residence at the Art Gallery of Ontario in 2015. An exhibition of Logue and Mitchell's recent work, I’m Not Myself At All: Deirdre Logue and Allyson Mitchell was held at the Agnes Etherington Art Centre in 2015. Logue was the focus of the 2017 Canadian Artist Spotlight at the Images Festival in Toronto. A retrospective exhibition of her work was organized in 2017 by A Space Gallery, Gallery 44 Centre for Contemporary Photography, Images Festival, Oakville Galleries and Open Space Arts Society.

Logue has worked for many years with artist-run organizations in Canada. She was a founding member of the Media City Film Festival (Windsor) and the Media Arts Network of Ontario. She has served as Executive Director of the Images Festival and Canadian Filmmakers Distribution Centre, and Development Director at Vtape. Logue has also served on the boards of Canadian Artists' Representation/Le Front des artistes canadiens (CARFAC) and the Independent Media Arts Alliance.

== Works ==
Logue's work takes the form of single- or multiple-channel video installations, usually featuring the artist as performer. Enlightened Nonsense (1997-2000) incorporates a number of shorter works looped on multiple channels. Other recent work includes Per Se (2005), Hobbs Obliques (2012), Crying with Colours (2012) and Set Upset (2017). Her work is distributed by V tape in Toronto.
