= Geo Wyeth =

American musician and performer

Geo Wyex, formerly known as Geo Wyeth (born 1984) is a primordial ooze musician, performer, and visual artist known for songs, performances and soundscapes works that explore, augment, and reimagine the material poetic articulations of absence. His work often features characters, outcasts and alienated trans / queer subjects, and the cosomologies that come out of such positionality. As of 2017, he is based in Rotterdam, the Netherlands.

== Early life and education ==
Geo Wyex was born in New York, New York in 1984 and grew up in Hell's Kitchen New York City and Montclair, New Jersey. He received a BA from Yale University.

== Work ==
Wyex's work combines installation, music and performance in which handmade sets and unusual costumes join with absurd storytelling in performances that break down the boundaries between the audience and the performer and create an experience of communal intimacy.

== Awards and fellowships ==
Among the honors which Geo Wyex has earned are:

- Dolf Henkes Prijs Rotterdam, NL -(2021)
- Mondriaan Fonds Deltaworkers Residency (2019)
- Rijksakademie van beeldende kunsten Residency (2015)"Geo Wyeth". Rijksakademie.
- Art Matters Foundation Grant (2012)
- Jerome Foundation Travel and Research Grant (2011)

== Selected performances ==
Wyex has presented performances at art institutions including MoMA PS1, The Stedelijk Museum Amsterdam, The New Museum, LA MoCA.

- 2024 - "Nobody Wade Never Too Much" - JOAN Gallery, Los Angeles, USA
- 2018 - I'm A Chip/Make This Music Disappear - Buda Kunstencentrum, Kortrijk, NLD
- 2017 - Juice CrosxxxSing - The New Museum, New York City, USA
- 2016 - Storm Excellent Salad - MoMA PS1, New York City, USA
