= Niv Acosta =

American choreographer

- Born: May 1988 (age 38); Washington Heights, Manhattan, New York City
- Occupation: Choreographer
- Years active: 2005–present

Niv Acosta (born May 1988) is a transgender American dancer, choreographer and artist. His project Discotropic was featured in the Triennial at the New Museum in 2015. Acosta aims to address larger modern concepts through his work and his work revolves around race and performance.

== Early life and education ==
Acosta was born in the Washington Heights neighborhood of Manhattan in New York City, to a 15 year old single Black Dominican mother. He majored in dance at Washington Irving High School under the direction of Leslie Zema. In 2005 and 2006, he attended the Martha Graham School of Contemporary Dance as a scholarship student. After graduation, he began studying dance and choreography at the California Institute of the Arts in Los Angeles. In the summer holidays, Acosta attended American Dance Festival at Duke University, where he began to find his voice as a choreographer. Between 2009 and 2010, Acosta took a break from dance to discover himself, and came out as transgender, as he began to understand why it had felt hard to identify as a female dancer. Acosta began to choreograph again in 2010, and moved back to New York soon after.

== Career ==
During his years at the California Institute of the Arts, he choreographed two denzel pieces, which drew inspiration from Denzel Washington. After moving back to New York, he began working on a third one, denzel superstructure. In 2011, Acosta auditioned for Fresh Tracks at New York Live Arts and started working on another incarnation of denzel. He became a resident artist at New York Live Arts by the end of 2011, and presented his first draft of the 5th denzel piece, denzel mini petite b a t h t u b happymeal. This piece was later premiered at Brooklyn Arts Exchange in March 2012. During summer 2012, Acosta began developing the final incarnation of the denzel series – i shot denzel. He successfully launched a Kickstarter campaign for the world premiere of i shot denzel on January 30, 2014, and he later commented that "the exposure from the premiere skyrocketed his career in ways invaluable".

For his piece Discotropic featured in the Triennial at the New Museum, Acosta was inspired by the made for TV film that appeared in 1978, Star Wars Holiday Special. During the making of the film, donors and actors demanded that a black person be cast in the film, so the network CBS cast Diahann Carroll to appear as a hologram. Inspired by this figure, Acosta lip-synced the words Carroll's character, Mermeia, sang in the film. Speaking to Vice Magazine, Acosta says that through this reperformance of the piece, he explores sci-fi film with a "specific focus on Black American experience, and then how I see and rework that as a queer, trans-identified person in the contemporary world."

niv Acosta and Fannie Sosa: Black Power Naps was created in 2018 for an exhibition at Matadero Madrid during Madrid Pride. It was remounted in 2019 for Performance Space New York, won a 2019 Creative Capital Award. The exhibition focused on the "Sleep Gap" between white and racialized people, whereby people of colour are statistically getting less sleep than white people. The artists created a venue of soft, luxurious, comfortable spaces where people of colour were invited to enjoy the rest that is often withheld as privilege. The piece was one of the first works to be covered by Performa Reports, a weekly performance art review from Performa. It was referenced as a conceptual influence on Solange's 2019 album When I get Home.

In addition to the 2019 Creative Capital Award, Acosta is a 2017 Louis Comfort Tiffany Foundation grant awardee.

== Concepts ==
=== denzel ===
The denzel series was inspired by Denzel Washington. Acosta was interested in him as a black male actor in mainstream media, and saw him as radical and empowering. Acosta's denzel provided context for his complex male identity.

In my perspective, Denzel is an archetype for black masculinity in media, and how that masculinity is perceived.

— niv Acosta, niv Acosta's World Premiere of "i shot denzel"

=== "Impossible Bodies" ===
i have been identifying with the term "impossible bodies". those words feel like they embody what i know is true for me and the people i like to work with. we have felt impossible outside of our safe environments. in the past i have involved my mother, 5 year old brother, my partner, close friends who are movers in a different world, and other artists of color. i feel the term "impossible bodies" is universal and is something everyone can relate to. with "possible bodies" fed to us as ideal, how do we make ourselves feel possible without compromising ourselves? drawing concepts of archetypes from film, musicals, songs, and choreography creates a base for me to begin identifying our self diagnosed impossibilities. from there i feel able to move towards ideas of myself/ourselves that feel empowering.

— niv Acosta, artist statement

== Works ==
=== Discotropic ===
Discotropic, New Museum Triennial, 2015

Discotropic was featured in the Triennial at the New Museum, and was inspired by the TV film that appeared in 1978, Star Wars Holiday Special. During the making of the film, donors and actors demanded that a black person be cast in the film, so the network CBS cast Diahann Carroll to appear as a hologram. Inspired by this figure, Acosta lip-synced the words Carroll's character, Mermeia, sang in the film. Speaking to Vice Magazine, Acosta says that through this reperformance of the piece, he explores sci-fi film with a "specific focus on Black American experience, and then how I see and rework that as a queer, trans-identified person in the contemporary world."

The performance was displayed in a monochromatic scale differentiating the dancers into black and white colors. The dancers move gracefully running from corner to corner, side to side, and spin with their black or white cape. Meanwhile one of the dancers who holds a white cape is dancing in almost a revolving movement around the others. When the four dancers break into a pair of two they linked arms and danced around forming a circle motion.

As the performance progressed the music changes from a soft melody to a darker one where we see some dancers crawling, wearing headscarves around their hair in the color black. Some dancers were not crawling, but instead they are holding their ears as they shake or twitch their head. The screen darkens a bit to see them all kneeled down making pulling motions to the black headscarf. As the performance is about the end the music changed back to a calming melody as the dancers spin and skip to the exit.

=== Black Power Naps ===
Niv Acosta and Fannie Sosa: Black Power Naps was created in 2018 for an exhibition at Matadero Madrid during Madrid Pride. It was remounted in 2019 for Performance Space New York, won a 2019 Creative Capital Award. The exhibition focused on the "Sleep Gap" between white and racialized people, whereby people of colour are statistically getting less sleep than white people. The artists created a venue of soft, luxurious, comfortable spaces where people of color were invited to enjoy the rest that is often withheld as privilege. The piece was one of the first works to be covered by Performa Reports, a weekly performance art review from Performa. It was referenced as a conceptual influence on Solange's 2019 album When I get Home.

In many photos we can see the museum being dark with some neon LED colored lights around and whimsy decorations that are either in gold or rainbow color. In some spaces the background has some art pieces having nude women resting or pridefully showing their bodies. In some photos there is a sign of rules before entering the space which includes. “If you see a Black person resting, don’t call the police! Never.”

- The denzel series
1. denzel
2. denzel prelude
3. denzel superstructure, the Community Education Center in Philadelphia, 2010
4. denzel again, New York Live Arts, 2011
5. denzel minipetite b a t h t u b happymeal, Upstart Festival at Brooklyn Arts Exchange, 2012
6. i shot denzel, New York Live Arts, 2014
