= Mel Y. Chen =

Mel Y. Chen is a professor of gender & women's studies and director of the Center for the Study of Sexual Culture at the University of California, Berkeley as well its disability studies minor. They have done academic work in queer theory, gender studies, animal studies, critical race theory, disability studies, and critical discourse analysis.

== Education and career ==
Chen received a Ph.D. in linguistics from U.C. Berkeley.

Chen's first book, Animacies: Biopolitics, Racial Mattering, and Queer Affect (2012) was published by Duke University Press and received the Modern Language Association GL/Q Caucus' Alan Bray Memorial Book Prize for its contribution to LGBTQ literature and cultural studies. In Animacies, Chen explores the ways in which race, sexuality, and ability are tied to hierarchical concepts of animacy and death.

== Bibliography ==
- Animacies: Biopolitics, Racial Mattering, and Queer Affect. Duke University Press, 2012.
- Intoxicated: Race, Disability, and Chemical Intimacy across Empire. Duke University Press, 2023.
