= Jack Foley (poet) =

American poet

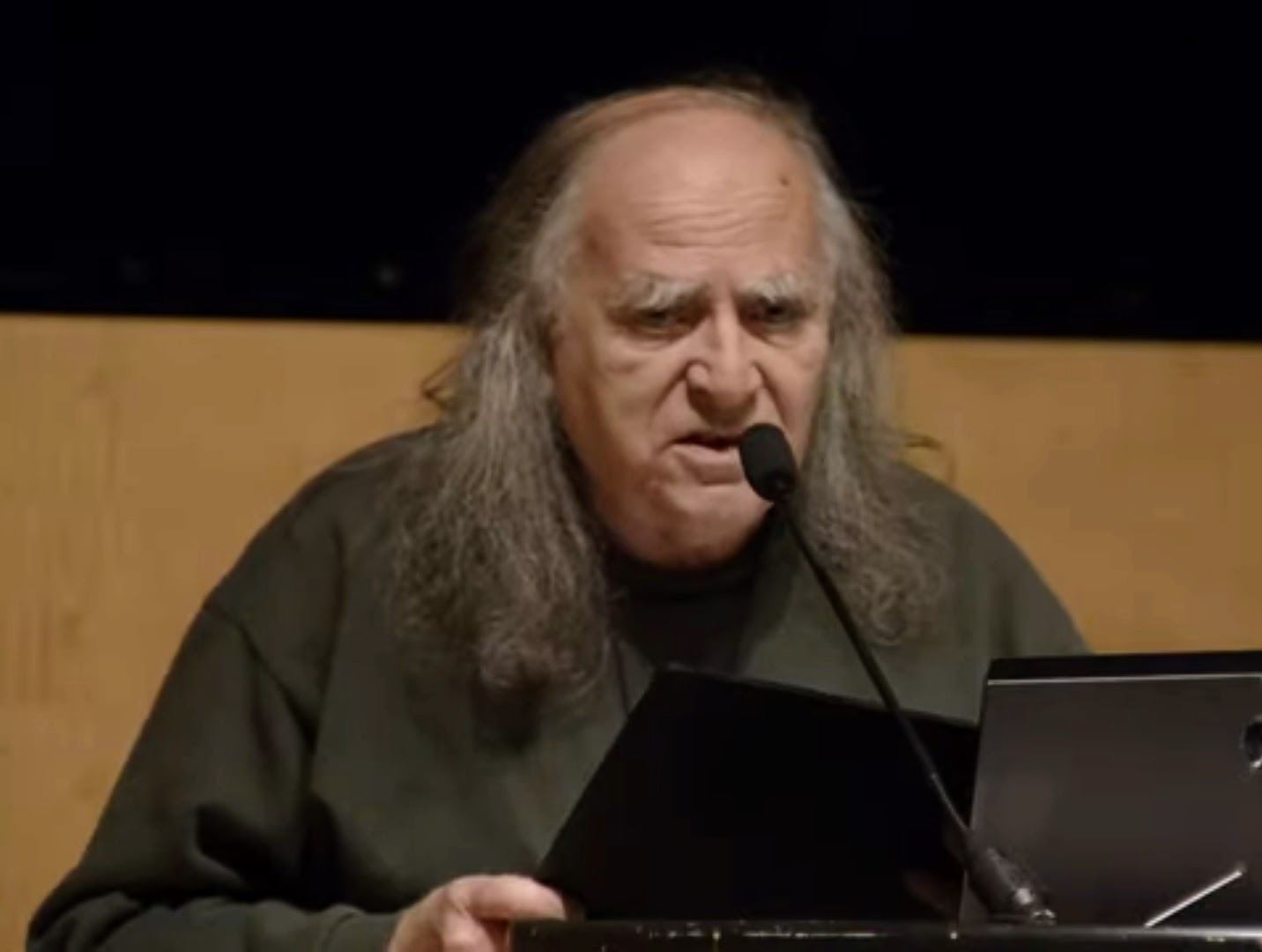
Jack Foley, 2018

John Wayne Harold "Jack" Foley (1940-2025) was an American poet and radio personality, living in Oakland, California.

== Biography ==
John Wayne Harold Foley was born in Neptune, New Jersey, raised in Port Chester, New York, and educated at Cornell University and the University of California-Berkeley. His career as a poet is unique because it has always involved performance, specifically the presentation of “multivoiced” pieces written by Foley but performed by both Foley and his late wife, Adelle Joan Foley (1940-2016). These pieces often feature conflicting, simultaneous voices whose interrelationships reflect Foley’s often-stated belief that “some parts of the mind don’t know what other parts are doing.”

Foley met Adelle in November, 1960 while he was attending Cornell and she was attending Goucher College in Maryland. They married on December 21, 1961; the couple had one child, Sean (born 1974). The Foleys moved to California in 1963 so that he could attend UC-Berkeley and she could work at the Federal Reserve Bank of San Francisco. Foley received an MA in English Literature at UC Berkeley and published several poems and articles, but by 1974, influenced by Charles Olson's Maximus Poems, he had dropped out of graduate school to pursue a career as a poet and writer. His first poetry reading, in which he read jointly with Adelle, was in June 1985. Since 1987, he has published 15 books of poetry, 5 books of criticism, a book of stories, and a two-volume “chronoencyclopedia,” Visions & Affiliations: California Poetry 1940-2005.

In 2010, he received a Lifetime Achievement Award from the Berkeley Poetry Festival, and June 5, 2010 was designated Jack Foley Day in Berkeley, California. In 2018 he became the recipient of the Albert Nelson Marquis Lifetime Achievement Award. His poetry books often include accompanying CDs or cassette tapes on which Foley and Adelle perform his work. After Adelle's death in 2016 Foley has found a new love and performance partner in Sangye Land, daughter of poet Julie Rogers and stepdaughter of poet David Meltzer. Since 1988, he has hosted a show of interviews and poetry presentations on Berkeley radio station, KPFA.

In 2019, Monongahela Books released Foley’s Unmanageable Masterpiece, edited by Dana Gioia and Peter Whitfield. The book discusses and celebrates Foley’s Visions & Affiliations: “Some...considered the elaborate time-line the first adequate account of California’s complex and contradictory literary life. Others recognized Foley’s radical innovation in changing how literary history could be written. A few even considered these strange and sprawling yet compulsively readable tomes an oddball masterpiece.”

== Works ==
- Letters/Lights – Words for Adelle (Mother's Hen, 1987, ISBN 0-914370-55-3)
- Gershwin - Poems (Norton Coker Press, 1991, ISBN 1-879457-10-5)
- Adrift (Pantograph Press,1993, ISBN 1-880766-05-1)
- Exiles (Pantograph Press, 1996, ISBN 1-880766-12-4)
- Dead/Requiem,with Ivan Arguelles (Pantograph Press,1998, ISBN 1-880766-16-7)
- Saint James: An Homage to James Joyce, with Ivan Arguelles (Pantograph Press,1998, ISBN 1-880766-17-5)
- Foley's Books – California Rebels, Beats & Radicals (Pantograph Press, 2000, ISBN 1-880766-26-4)
- O Powerful Western Star – Poetry & Art in California (Pantograph Press, 2000, ISBN 1-880766-25-6)
- Some Songs by Georges Brassens (Goldfish Press, 2001, ISBN 0-9711601-0-4)
- The "Fallen Western Star" Wars: A Debate About Literary California, editor (Scarlet Tanager Books, 2001, ISBN 0-9670224-4-4)
- Greatest Hits 1974-2003 (Pudding House Press, 2004, ISBN 1-58998-274-6)
- Fennel in the Rain, with Adelle Foley (Small Change Series, WordTemple Press, 2007)
- The Dancer & the Dance: A Book of Distinctions, foreword by Al Young(Red Hen Press, 2008, ISBN 978-1-59709-094-0)
- Visions & Affiliations: A California Literary Time Line, Poets & Poetry,2 volumes (Pantograph Press, 2011, Part I ISBN 978-1-61364-067-8, Part II ISBN 978-1-61364-068-5)
- Sketches Poetical (2012, artist’s book with CD, a collaboration with Helen Breger; art by Breger, poetry by Foley). Designed by Paul Veres. No ISBN.
- Eyes: Selected Poems (Poetry Hotel Press, 2013), introduction by Ivan Argüelles, ISBN 978-0-9891578-0-3
- Life: Poems by Jack Foley (Word Palace Press, 2014), chapbook, ISBN 0988804549, ISBN 978-0-9888045-4-8
- A California Beat Literary Timeline—The 1950s (The Beat Scene Press, England, 2014), a reprint of the 1950s section from Visions & Affiliations
- RIVERRUN: (Poetry Hotel Press, 2016), poetry, ISBN 978-0-9891578-4-1
- The Tiger & Other Tales (Sagging Meniscus Press, 2016), stories, prose sketches, plays, ISBN 978-1-944697-13-6 (paperback), ISBN 978-1-944697-14-3 (ebook)
- Grief Songs (Sagging Meniscus Press, 2017), poetry dealing with the aftermath of the death in 2016 of Jack's wife Adelle (paperback), ISBN 9781944697488
- When Sleep Comes: Shillelagh Songs (Sagging Meniscus Press, 2019), poetry (paperback), ISBN 9781944697860
