= A. L. Steiner =

American artist

- Born: 1967 (age 58–59); Miami, Florida
- Known for: Multimedia art, photography, collage, video, performance art
- Website: https://www.hellomynameissteiner.com

A. L. Steiner (born 1967 in Miami, Florida) is an American multimedia artist, author and educator, based in Brooklyn, New York. Her solo and collaborative art projects use constructions of photography, video, installation, collage, and performance. Steiner's art incorporates queer and eco-feminist elements. She is a collective member of the musical group Chicks on Speed; and, along with Nicole Eisenman, is a co-curator/co-founder of Ridykeulous, a curatorial project that encourages the exhibitions of queer and feminist art.

== Biography ==
A. L. Steiner was born in 1967 in Miami, Florida. Steiner received a Bachelor of Arts in 1989 in Communication from George Washington University.

Steiner was Visiting Assistant Professor and M.F.A. Program Director the Roski School of Art and Design, University of Southern California in 2014. In 2016, she was appointed Critic at the Yale School of Art and currently serves as the school's Senior Critic in Film/Video. She was also faculty in Bard College's Milton Avery School of the Arts MFA photography program.

Steiner is the recipient of the Foundation for Contemporary Arts Grants to Artists award (2017), the 2015–2016 Berlin Prize, and the 2015 Louis Comfort Tiffany Foundation grant.

== Art work ==
=== More real than reality itself (2014) ===
More real than reality itself was a "multichannel video installation" for the Whitney Biennial of 2014. The piece aimed to examine political activism and documentary films, especially their use of linear narratives. The film was originally exhibited alongside the installation Cost-benefit analysis, a "collage of images of bodies and the environments they inhabit that amplifies the exchanges and encounters staged in the film." Steiner said of the piece,

[It is] a conduit to viewing other subjective histories [which has become] a platform for questioning intentionality and the relationship [in order to give] documentary or archival forms - a fragile and precarious place for both the object and subject.

=== Community action center (2010) ===
From 2007 to 2010, A. L. Steiner and A. K. Burns composed Community Action Center. It is a sixty-nine-minute socio-sexual video which utilizes erotics to express the personal sexual and political lives of the people in their community, with a largely queer focus. The video was filmed in New York State and Los Angeles.

In 2013, Burns and Steiner took the video on a fourteen city, ten state screening tour entitled Community Action Center or BUST!: The X-Cuntry Summer Tour. The tour culminated in October 2013, with an evening performance at The Kitchen, New York. The video was accompanied by live performances by Justin Vivian Bond, Nick Hallett, Sam Miller, K8 Hardy, and other artists from the Community Action Center soundtrack.

=== Greater New York (2010) ===
Steiner was one of 68 artists to participate in MoMA PS1's quinquennial exhibition, Greater New York. Her contribution, entitled Angry, Articulate, Inevitable, consisted of a collage of Steiner's photographs spanned across several walls.

=== 1 Million Photos, 1 Euro Each (minimum order) (2005) ===
1 million Photos, 1 Euro Each is a wall-to-wall, floor-to-ceiling collage installed at the John Connelly Presents' project room. It consists of photographs (mostly of women but also of men) and sexual nature shots of varying size. There is also a small television playing a rapid-fire, stop-action loop of the photographs on the wall and others, with text (often the title of the work) between them.

== Activism ==
=== W.A.G.E. ===
A. L. Steiner is a co-founder of Working Artists and the Greater Economy (W.A.G.E.) a New York-based activist group founded in 2008. W.A.G.E advocates that artists, performers and independent curators working with US institutions should be compensated fairly for their work.

== Permanent collections ==
- "Untitled (Alex Eating Berries)", Photography, The Brooklyn Museum of Art
- The Marieluise Hessel collection
- The Museum of Modern Art
