= Kaleta Doolin =

American artist and philanthropist

- Born: 1950; Dallas, Texas
- Education: Southern Methodist University Meadows School of the Arts
- Occupation(s): Artist and philanthropist
- Organization: Kaleta A. Doolin Foundation

Kaleta Ann Doolin (born 1950) is an American artist and philanthropist. Doolin is known for her advocacy for women artists.

== Early life and education ==
Doolin was born in Dallas, Texas to Mary Kathryn (Kitty) Doolin and Charles Elmer Doolin. Her father Charles was the inventor of Fritos and Cheetos. Doolin received a B.F.A. degree in 1983 and an M.F.A. degree in 1987, both from the Southern Methodist University Meadows School of the Arts. A survey of her works, entitled Crazier than Crazy Quilts, was featured in the Erin Cluley Gallery in 2023.

== Philanthropy ==
In 1995, with her husband Alan Govenar, she founded the Texas African American Photography Archive, consisting of 60,000 photographs by vernacular and community African-American photographers in Texas. The pair donated the archive to the International Center of Photography in 2014.

In 1998, Doolin founded the Kaleta A. Doolin Foundation in order to help American art institutions purchase and exhibit the work of women artists. The foundation supported the Nasher Sculpture Center, the Dallas Museum of Art, the Hammer Museum, the Brooklyn Museum, the Dia Beacon, the DIA Chelsea and the Modern Women's Fund of the Museum of Modern Art in New York In 2015 the foundation created the Kaleta A. Doolin Acquisitions Fund for Women Artists at the Nasher Sculpture Center.
