= Nicole Eisenman =

American artist (born 1965)

- Born: 1965 (age 60–61); Verdun, France
- Education: Rhode Island School of Design (BFA)
- Known for: Ridykeulous
- Notable work: Heading Down River on the USS J-Bone of an Ass (2017); Procession (2019)
- Awards: Guggenheim Fellowship (1996); Carnegie Prize (2013); MacArthur Fellow (2015)

Nicole Eisenman (born 1965) is a French-born American artist known for her oil paintings and sculptures. She has been awarded the Guggenheim Fellowship (1996), the Carnegie Prize (2013), and has thrice been included in the Whitney Biennial (1995, 2012, 2019). On September 29, 2015, she won a MacArthur Fellowship award for "restoring the representation of the human form a cultural significance that had waned during the ascendancy of abstraction in the 20th century."

Eisenman lives in Brooklyn.

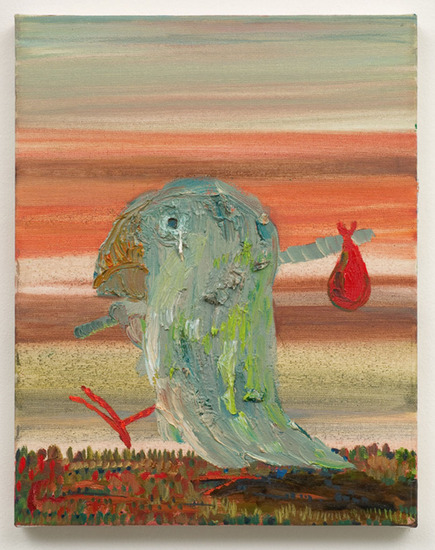
Foghorn Hits the Road (2007)

== Biography ==
Nicole Eisenman was born in 1965 in Verdun, France where her father was stationed as an army psychiatrist. She is of German-Jewish descent; her great-grandmother was Esther Hamerman, a Polish-born painter.

In 1970, Eisenman's family moved from France to Scarsdale, New York, where she spent her childhood. She attended the Rhode Island School of Design, graduating with a B.F.A in painting in 1987. She then moved to New York City.

Between 2003 and 2009, Eisenman taught at Bard College in Annandale-on-Hudson.

== Work ==
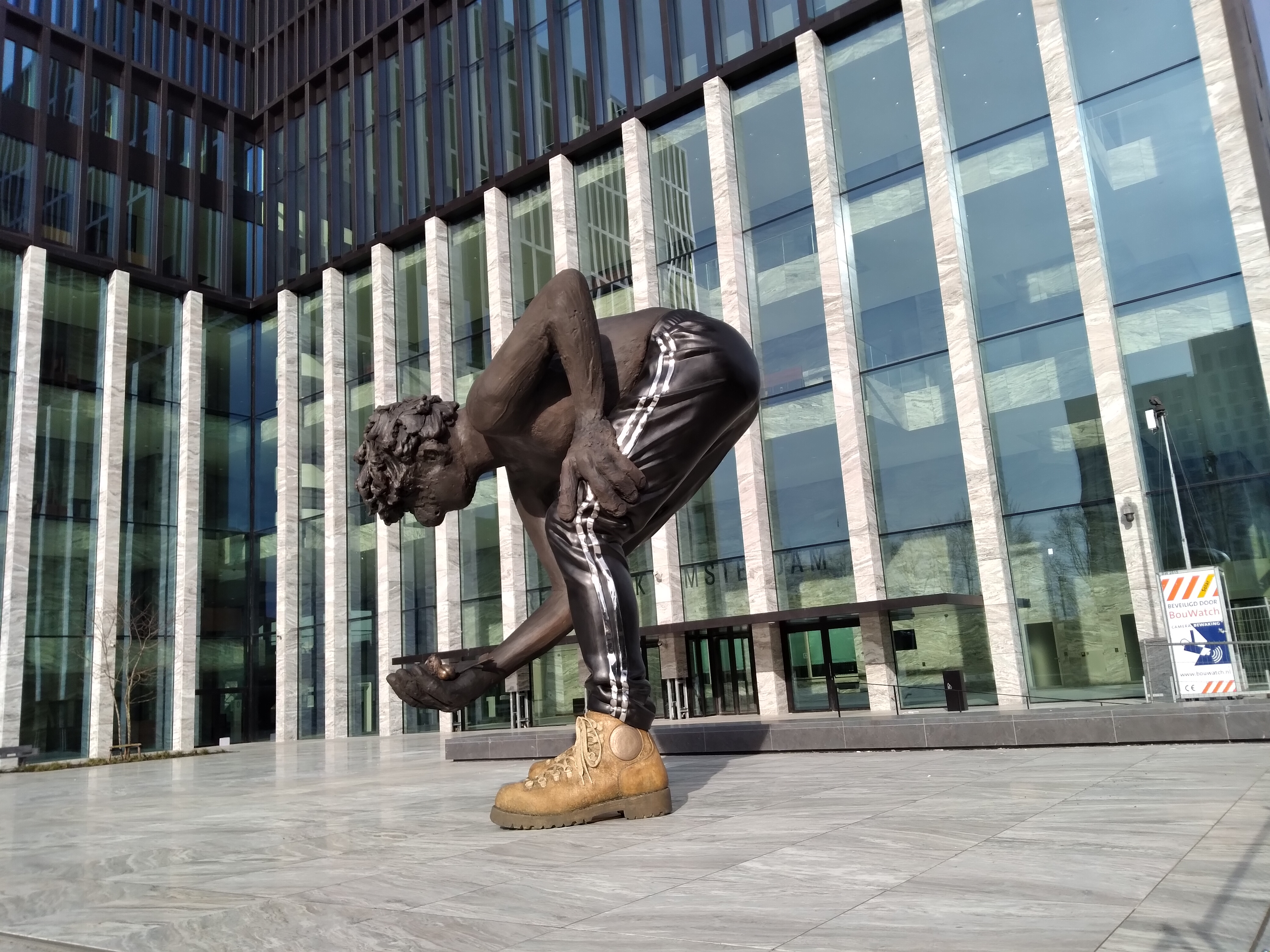
Love or Generosity (2020), Amsterdam

Stack (2022-24) at Burlington House in 2026

Eisenman's figurative oil paintings often toy with themes of sexuality, comedy, and caricature. Though she is known for her paintings, the artist also creates installations, drawings, etchings, lithography, monotypes, woodcuts, and sculptures. With A.L. Steiner, she is the co-founder of the queer/feminist curatorial initiative Ridykeulous. Eisenman's work was included in the 2022 exhibition Women Painting Women at the Modern Art Museum of Fort Worth.

=== Sculpture ===
Eisenman also created sculptures that have been shown at the 58th Venice Biennale, 2017 Skulptur Projekte Münster, and the 2019 Whitney Biennial. Eisenman began working on Sketch for a Fountain in 2012, a bronze piece acquired by the Nasher Sculpture Center in 2019. The acquisition was funded by the Kaleta A. Doolin Acquisitions Fund for Women Artists and the Green Family Collection.

=== Murals ===
Eisenman has created large scale painted murals for venues including the Drawing Center, Trial Ballroom New York, ICA London, and the Whitney Museum.

== Exhibitions ==
- Nicole Eisenman, Kunsthalle Zürich (2007)
- Matrix 248, Berkeley Art Museum (2013)
- Dear Nemesis, Nicole Eisenman 1993–2013, Contemporary Art Museum St. Louis (2014)
- Dear Nemesis: Nicole Eisenman 1993–2013, Institute of Contemporary Art, Philadelphia (2014)
- Masterpieces & Curiosities: Nicole Eisenman’s Seder (2015), The Jewish Museum
- Nicole Eisenman: Al-ugh-ories, New Museum (2016)
- Faces: Painted Reliefs, Anton Kern Gallery (2017)
- Nicole Eisenman: Dark Light, Secession, Vienna, Austria (2017)
- Baden Baden Baden, Staatliche Kunsthalle Baden-Baden (2019)
- Nicole Eisenman: Sturm und Drang, The Contemporary Austin, Austin, 2020
- Nicole Eisenman: Giant Without a Body, Astrup Fearnley Museet, Oslo, Norway, 2021
- Career retrospective Nicole Eisenman: What Happened at Whitechapel Gallery, London, 2023
- Nicole Eisenman: Prince, Print Center New York, New York, 2023
- Nicole Eisenman: What Happened, Museum of Contemporary Art Chicago, 2024
- Nicole Eisenman. with, and, of, on Sculpture, Hauser & Wirth, Paris, 2024
- Nicole Eisenman: STY, 52 Walker, New York, New York, 2025.

== Recognition ==
Eisenman has been awarded numerous grants and prizes including the Guggenheim Fellowship (1996), the Carnegie Prize (2013), the Anonymous Was a Woman Award (2014) and the Louis Comfort Tiffany Grant (1995). She was also the recipient of a 2015 MacArthur Fellowship. Also in 2015, she was named as one of The Forward 50.

== Collections ==
The artist's work can be found in a number of institutions, including:

- Art Institute of Chicago
- The Jewish Museum, New York
- Kunsthalle Zürich
- Metropolitan Museum of Art
- Museum of Contemporary Art, Los Angeles
- Museum of Modern Art, New York
- Nasher Sculpture Center
- San Francisco Museum of Modern Art
- Smithsonian American Art Museum
- Walker Art Center, Minneapolis
- Whitney Museum of American Art, New York

== Art market ==
Eisenman is represented by Hauser & Wirth (since 2019), Sadie Coles in London and Anton Kern. She previously worked with Galerie Barbara Weiss. and Vielmetter Los Angeles

== Personal life ==
Eisenman is a lesbian. In a 2016 interview with The New York Times Eisenman said of her gender identity, "I’m gender fluid, but I use the “she” pronoun. I believe in the radicality of stretching the definition of what 'she' is." Eisenman uses both she/her and they/them pronouns.

Eisenman has two children with a former partner, Victoria Robinson.

== Bibliography ==
- Nicole Eisenman: Giant without A Body (Astrup Fearnley Museet, 2021)
- Nicole Eisenman: Behavior (Rice Gallery, 1998)
- Nicole Eisenman: Selected works 1993–2003 (Herbert F. Johnson Museum of Art, 2003)
- Nicole Eisenman: Selected Works 1994–2004 ed. Victor Mathieu (Walther König, 2008)
- Nicole Eisenman: The Way We Weren't (Frances Young Tang Teaching Museum and Art Gallery, 2010)
- Nicole Eisenman ed. Beatrix Ruf (JRP-Ringier, 2011)
- Parkett no. 91 (Parkett Verlag, 2012)
- Nicole Eisenman: Dear Nemesis, 1993–2013 (Contemporary Art Museum St. Louis/Walther König, 2014)
