= Morán Morán =

Contemporary art gallery in West Hollywood, Los Angeles, United States

Coordinates: 34.088014°N 118.376737°W

Morán Morán is a contemporary art gallery in Los Angeles. It was founded by Al Moran in 2008 as OHWOW, and was later renamed. The gallery began as an alliance of artists and curators presenting various exhibitions and publications. It is located at 641 N. Western Avenue, Los Angeles, CA 90004.

== History ==
As of spring 2011, Morán Morán opened a gallery location in Los Angeles, designed by New York City architect Rafael de Cárdenas. In 2021, the gallery opened a second gallery space located in the Polanco, Mexico City.

Former partner Aaron Bondaroff resigned from the gallery in February 2018 after multiple accusations of inappropriate sexual behavior towards women. The gallery's name was changed from Morán Bondaroff to Morán Morán.
