= Milton Avery Graduate School of the Arts =

Graduate art school at Bard College

Coordinates: 42.01914°N 73.91418°W

Milton Avery Graduate School of the Arts is a graduate program associated with Bard College that grants Master of Fine Arts degrees.

Founded in 1981, Milton Avery Graduate School of the Arts (otherwise known as the Bard MFA program) is a nontraditional school for interdisciplinary study in the visual and creative arts. The program takes place over two years and two months, with students residing on campus during three consecutive summers, and two winter sessions of independent study completed off campus. Each summer session runs for eight intensive weeks. Currently ranked as one of ten most influential Master of Fine Arts programs in the world by Artspace Magazine.

The Bard MFA program is one of eight graduate programs at Bard College.
