= Textile Museum of Canada =

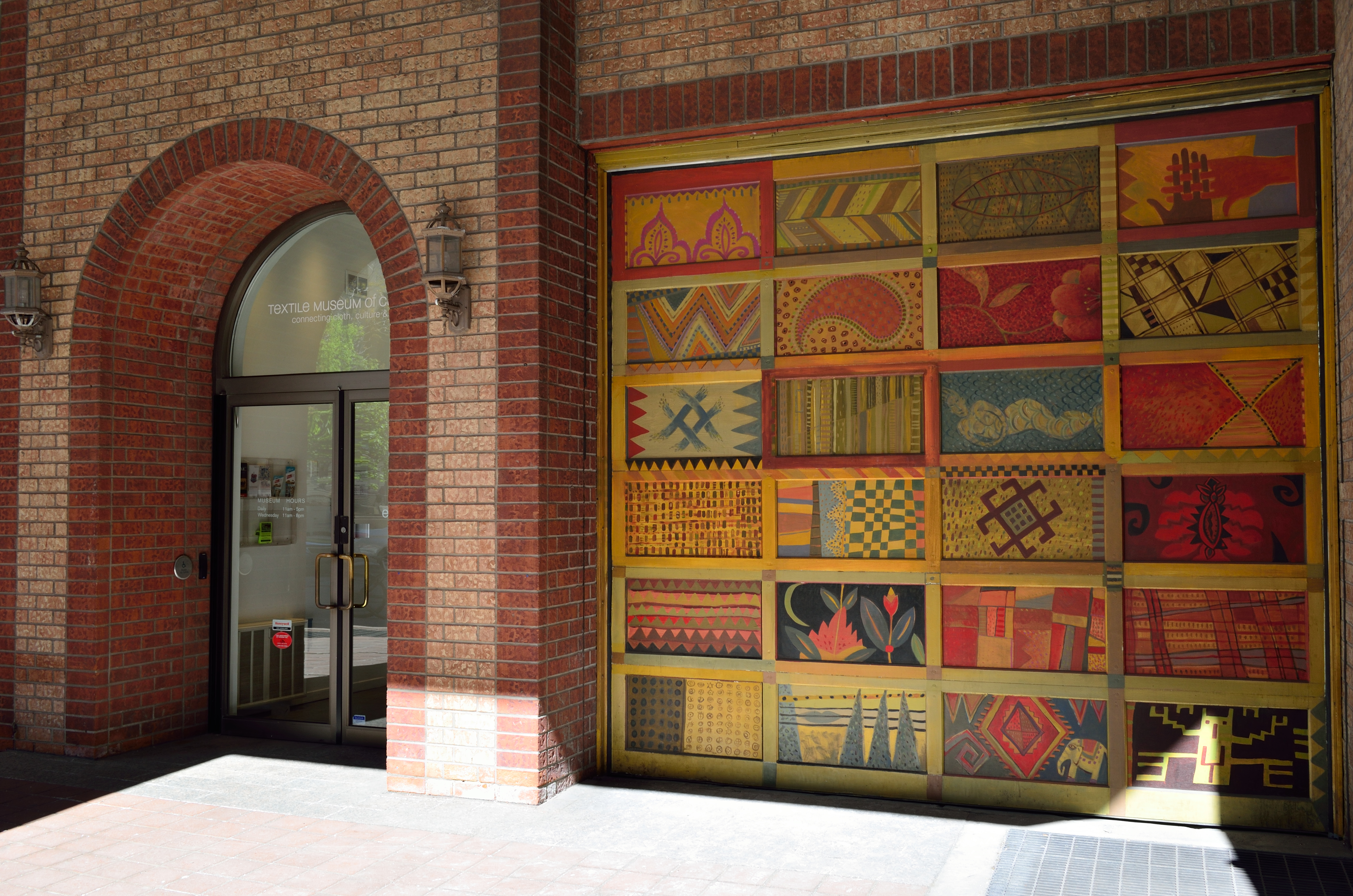
- Entrance to the Textile Museum of Canada
- Established: 1975
- Location: Toronto, Ontario, Canada
- Coordinates: 43°39′17″N 79°23′12″W
- Type: Textile museum
- Visitors: 29,190
- Public transit access: St. Patrick
- Website: textilemuseum.ca

The Textile Museum of Canada, located in Toronto, Ontario, Canada, is a museum dedicated to the collection, exhibition, and documentation of textiles.

== History ==
The Textile Museum of Canada was founded as the Canadian Museum of Carpets and Textiles in 1975 by Max Allen and Simon Waegemaekers. Located above an ice cream shop in Mirvish Village the museum's collection was initially based on textiles collected during business trips. The museum relocated to its current location as in 1989. It now includes exhibitions of international contemporary art, craft, and design.

It recently acknowledged the history of the land, stating on their website, "The Textile Museum of Canada operates on the traditional territories of the Mississaugas of the Credit, the Anishinaabe, the Chippewa, the Haudenosaunee, and the Wendat."

== Collection ==
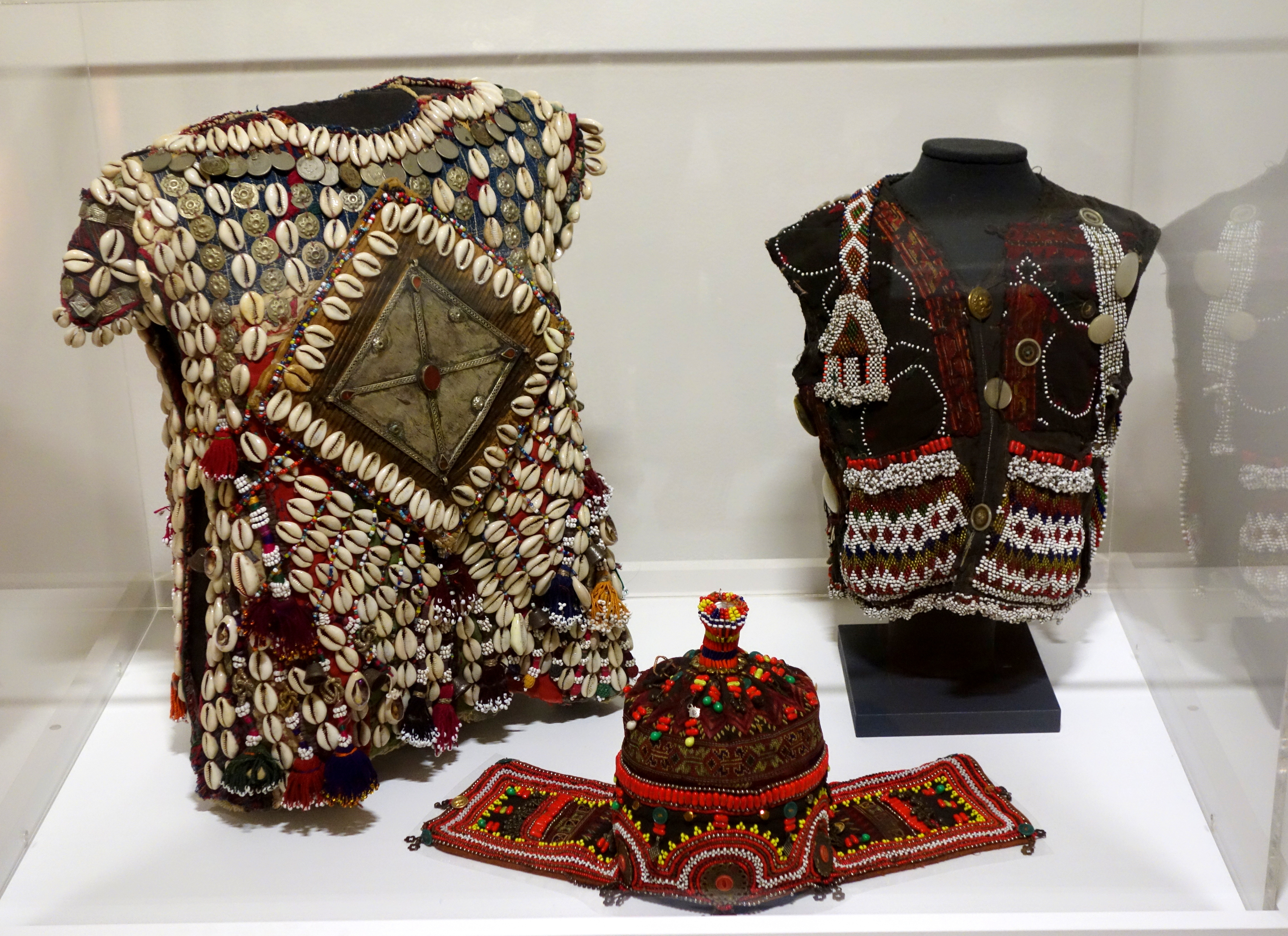
An exhibit of a child's tunic from the museum's collection

The Textile Museum of Canada has a permanent collection of more than 15,000 textiles from around the world. Covering 2,000 years of textile history, the collection includes fabrics, ceremonial cloths, garments, carpets, quilts and related artifacts.

The museum presents curated exhibitions of contemporary work and historic and ethnographic artifacts drawn from its own and others’ collections. It is home to the H.N. Pullar Library, a reference collection of material focused on non-industrial textiles. The museum also offers lectures, round-table discussions, workshops, music and dance performances, hands-on demonstrations, school programs and public tours.

Canadian Tapestry: The Fabric of Cultural Diversity, one of the museum's digitization projects, provides online access to 7,000 artifacts. A second phase will provide access to an additional 3,500 items.

Several of the museum's exhibits and publications have won multiple awards, including:

- Cloth & Clay: Communicating Culture (2003)
- Canadian Tapestry: The Fabric of Cultural Diversity (2006)
- A Terrible Beauty: An Installation (2006)
- Thor Hansen: Crafting a Canadian Style (2006)

== Affiliations ==
The museum is affiliated with CMA, CHIN, and Virtual Museum of Canada.

== See also ==
- List of museums in Toronto
