= Grand Arts =

Grand Arts was a nonprofit contemporary art space in downtown Kansas City, Missouri, whose mission was to help national and international artists realize projects considered too risky, provocative or complex to otherwise attract support. It was co-founded by Margaret Silva and Sean Kelley in 1995 and operated until 2015 with sole funding from the Margaret Hall Silva Foundation.

Facilities included a 4,000-square-foot fabrication studio, exhibition spaces, offices, and an on-site apartment available for visiting artists.

== History ==
Margaret Silva and Sean Kelley co-founded Grand Arts in 1995 to give artists "a place for radical experimentation, without the constraints of too little time and even less money". Kelley left Grand Arts in 2003.

Stacy Switzer served as artistic director from 2004 until the gallery's close.

In total, Grand Arts produced 90 exhibitions with more than 120 artists. Projects often took years to produce, from concept to realization, and the organization's full-time staff tended to each phase of the process: research, design, fabrication, programming, publicity and beyond. Grand Arts' practice of long-term collaborative project development is in part what distinguished it from other granting organizations, according to Switzer: "That's what was special about the Grand Arts process. It wasn't that an artist would propose something and we would fabricate it according to the artist's specs. Often, there was a long conversation about how to push, pull, and tease the idea, pull out the most provocative threads and find other people in other fields who could help us enhance it in other ways".

Following exhibition, projects produced at Grand Arts belonged solely to the artist. The works were often then exhibited in museums, commercial galleries and/or art fairs. For example:

- Isaac Julien's 1999 Long Road to Mazatlan was co-produced by Grand Arts and ArtPace in 1999 and exhibited as one of two Julien works at Tate Britain in 2001, when the artist was short-listed for the Turner Prize.
- Patricia Cronin's Memorial to a Marriage, a three-ton marble mortuary statue produced by Grand Arts in 2002 and installed thereafter at Woodlawn Cemetery, has been shown in more than 35 exhibitions, including the Brooklyn Museum, Palmer Museum of Art, Neuberger Museum of Art, Contemporary Arts Center in Cincinnati, and the FLAG Art Foundation; and is in several museum collections, including Smithsonian National Portrait Gallery, in Washington, DC; Pérez Art Museum Miami; and Kelvingrove Art Gallery and Museum, in Glasgow, where it is on permanent view.
- Sanford Biggers' Blossom, produced by Grand Arts in 2007, was acquired by the Brooklyn Museum in 2011.
- Laurel Nakadate's Stay the Same Never Change, produced by Grand Arts in 2008, was a selection at the 2009 Sundance Film Festival and then screened at MoMA’s New Directors/New Films series.
- William Pope.L's Trinket, produced by Grand Arts in 2008, was re-staged at the Museum of Contemporary Art, Los Angeles in 2015 and featured in a performance by Kendrick Lamar at the 2015 BET Awards. Christopher Knight writes in the Los Angeles Times: "Nearly seven years on, the sculpture still resonates."
- Cody Critcheloe/SSION's feature film BOY was produced by Grand Arts in 2010 and screened at Peres Projects, in Los Angeles and Berlin; Smart Museum of Art, in Chicago; Hole Gallery, in New York; and Vyktor Wynd Fine Art, in London.
- The Propeller Group's 2015 A Universe of Collisions — Grand Arts' last-ever show — was included in the Venice Biennale that year.

Upon Grand Arts' closing, Silva donated the building, a former auto shop located at 1819 Grand Boulevard, to the Kansas City Art Institute.

== Exhibition timeline ==
Year	Exhibition title	Artist(s)	Essayist
1995	(untitled)	Glenn Goldberg	Tad Wiley
1995	Like and Ethereal Transfer	Hirokazu Fukawa	Barbara Bloemink
1995	RawShock	Brad Braverman	Ann Wylie
1995	New Works	Alice Aycock	Monroe Denton
1995	(untitled)	Ryuhei Rex Yuasa	Kazuhiro Yamamoto
1996	(untitled)	Lester Goldman	Roberta Lord
1996	In Code	Jane Lackey	Laurie Palmer
1996	Body Double	Kimberly Austin, Brad Braverman, Rossana Jeran and Jim Pennington, John O’Reilly, and Seth Rubin	Monroe Denton
1996	The Layman’s Guide to the Passage of the Millennium for the Preservation of Hysteria	Jeff Aeling	Peter von Ziegesar
1996	(untitled)	Mel Kendrick	Klaus Kertess
1997	(untitled)	China Marks	H. L. Hix
1997	(untitled)	Chris Larson	Ronald Jones
1997	(untitled)	Nick Cave	Karen Searle
1997	Spot Making Sense	Phil Argent, Linda Besemer, Ingrid Calame, Sally Elesby, Sharon Ellis, Jack Hallberg, Michael Pierzynski, Monique Prieto, Adam Ross, Pauline Stella Sanchez, Jennifer Steinkamp, and Yek	curator David Pagel
1997	(untitled)	Seton Smith	David Pagel
1997	(untitled)	Kimberly Austin	Roberta Lord
1998	In the Name of the Place	GALA Committee	Joshua Dector
1998	Monuments	Beth B.	Roberta Lord
1998	(untitled)	Michael Rees	Dominique Nohas
1998	in collaboration with Kansas City youth	Tim Rollins and K.O.S.	Michael Toombs
1998	(untitled)	Kirsten Mosher	Alexander Gray
1999	(untitled)	Stuart Netsky	Bill Arning
1999	(untitled)	James Drake	Bruce W. Ferguson
1999	B-Team	Zesty Meyers, Evan Snyderman, and Jeff Zimmerman	Stephanie Cash
1999	New York: Neither/Nor	Ricci Albenda, Polly Apfelbaum, Erica Baum, Lucky DeBellevue, Steven Evans, Tony Feher, Rachel Feinstein, Eric Hanson, Rachel Harrison, Jonathan Horowitz, Chuck Nanney, Rob Pruitt, and Anthony Viti	curator Bill Arning
1999	(untitled)	Walter Zimmerman	Roberta Lord
1999	En Masse	Jesse Kaminsky, Demetre Keros, Jennie Pakradooni, Kristine Veith, and Michael Yglesias	Andrew Wells
2000	War	Jim Leedy	H. L. Hix
2000	Long Road to Mazatlan	Isaac Julien	Okwui Enwezor
2000	Eye to Eye	Larry Buechel	Roberta Lord
2000	Fast: Five Years at Grand Arts	Kimberly Austin, Alice Aycock, Brad Braverman, GALA Committee, Glenn Goldberg, Lester Goldman, Dennis Oppenheim, Roxy Paine, Tim Rollins and K.O.S., Heather Schatz and Eric Chan	Roberta Lord
2000	(untitled)	Dennis Oppenheim	Mary Beth Karoll
2000	De Tempore	Tara Donovan, Jyung Mee Park, and Achim Mohné	Angela Anderson Adams
2001	(untitled)	Jesse Rosser	Ingrid Schaffner
2001	(untitled)	Troy Richards	Roberta Lord
2001	Anacronistas	Jamex and Einar de la Torre	Leah Ollman
2001	(untitled)	Roxy Paine	Tan Lin
2001	(untitled)	ChanSchatz	Bennett Simpson
2001	(untitled)	John Newman	Raphael Rubinstein
2002	The Porcelain Carpet Project	Marek Cecula	Roberta Lord
2002	Constructed Realities	Oliver Boberg, James Casebere, Catherine Chalmers, Gregory Crewdson, Anthony Goicolea, Yoshio Itagaki, Craig Kalpakjian, Izima Kaoru, David Levinthal, Florian Maier-Aichen, Didier Massard, Tracey Moffatt, Vik Muniz, Hiroshi Sugimoto, and Edwin Zwakman	curator Barbara J. Bloemink
2002	Operations of the Marvelous	John Powers	Philip Glahn
2002	Memorial to a Marriage	Patricia Cronin	David Frankel
2002	Spirit Mold	Richard Van Buren	Klaus Kertess
2003	Animal, Vegetable, Video: Where the Buffalo Roam	Sam Easterson	Lisa Fischman
2003	(untitled)	Ian Dawson	David Humphrey
2003	Immersion	Teresita Fernández	Rochelle Steiner
2003	American Cockroach	Catherine Chalmers	Tan Lin
2003	The Kansas and Missouri Topographical Model Project	Allan McCollum	Rhea Anastas
2004	Back to Nature: Collecting the Preserved Garden	Mara Adamitz Scrupe	Mary Jane Jacob
2004	Camera Obscura Photographs	George Woodman	Nancy Princenthal
2004	Join Us: Calls to Ecstasy from the Edge of Oblivion	Sanford Biggers, E.C. Brown, Christoph Büchel, C-Level, Critical Art Ensemble, Miranda July, Eddo Stern, Sarah Sze, Paul Vanouse, and Faith Wilding	Stacy Switzer
2004	Good-Time Mix Machine: Scrambler Drawings	Rosemarie Fiore	David Hunt
2004	Charlotte Street Awards Exhibition	Michael Converse, Egawa + Zbryk, Rachel Hayes, Seth Johnson, and Jay Norton	Stacy Switzer
2005	Manifest Destiny	Alexis Rockman	Linda Weintraub
2005	Mash-Up!: Eight Weeks of Mixing It Up and Throwing It Down (event series)	Archive (Anne Walsh and Chris Kubick), Bordermates, Brian Conley, Ammar Eloueini, The Evolution Control Committee, Fritz Haeg, Cameron Jamie, Yoshua Okon, Lucky Pierre, François Perrin, thedinnerparty.net, and Kerry Tribe	curated by Nato Thompson
2005	Muxìma	Alfredo Jaar	Patricia C. Phillips
2005	Tactical Ice Cream Unit	Aaron Gach/ Center for Tactical Magic	Stacy Switzer
2005	Conclusion of the System of Things	Nadine Robinson	Christine Y. Kim
2006	The Guard of Sorry Spirit	Aidas Bareikis	Maria Elena Buszek
2006	Faith Culture Collection	Neal Rock	Christopher Miles
2006	Urban Test Sites (event series)	Arts Subterranea, Filip Noterdaeme, Bill Shannon, and Margaret Wertheim	
2006	Riverboat Lovesongs for the Ghost Whale Regatta	Michael Jones McKean	Alison de Lima Greene
2006	Haunted States	CarianaCarianne, Mathilde ter Heijne, Laurel Nakadate, Mariah Robertson, and Siebren Versteeg	Stacy Switzer
2007	The FEAR of Smell/The Smell of FEAR	Sissel Tolaas	Elizabeth Thomas
2007	From the Fat of the Land: Alchemies, Ecologies, Attractions	Fritz Haeg, Filip Noterdaeme, Micaela O'Herlihy, Chase Pierson, Spurse, Tavares Strachan, Travis Watson, Katherine Wright, Lynus Young, and Adam Zaretsky	Linda Weintraub
2007	Blossom	Sanford Biggers	Cay Sophie Rabinowitz
2007	Charlotte Street Awards Exhibition	Cody Critcheloe, Jessica Kincaid, Emily Sall, and James Trotter	Julie Rodrigues Widholm
2008	Stay The Same Never Change	Laurel Nakadate	Neil LaBute
2008	(untitled)	Mary Kay and Rebecca Morales	Sue Spaid
2008	Parallel Deliria	Annie Lapin	Lane Relyea
2008	Animal Nationalism	William Pope.L	Gregory Volk
2009	Deep Time Rapid Time	Spurse	Stacy Switzer and Spurse
Apr. 1, 2009	It Is What It Is: Conversations about Iraq	Jeremy Deller, presented by Creative Time and the New Museum	
2009	The Juvenal Players	Pablo Helguera	Naief Yehya
2009	BOY	Cody Critcheloe/SSION	Stacy Switzer
2009	Ecstatic Resistance	Yael Bartana, Sharon Hayes, Matthew Lutz-Kinoy, My Barbarian, Jeanine Oleson, Ulrike Ottinger, Adrian Piper, Dean Spade and Craig Willse, A. L. Steiner, and Ian White	curator Emily Roysdon
2010	Orthostatic Tolerance: Launching into an Infinite Distance	Tavares Strachan	Franklin Sirmans
2010	Painting Séance	Ryan Mosley	Elizabeth Thomas
2010	Charlotte Street Awards Exhibition	Ari Fish, Sonié Ruffin, and Caleb Taylor	Lacey Wozny
2010	Dialogue by Design: Experimental Platforms for Intimate Conversations (event series)	Lori Brack, Julia Cole, Sylvie Fortin, May Tveit, Rob Walker, and Lacey Wozny	
2011	New Cornucopia and The Big IOU	John Salvest	Stacy Switzer
2012	Let’s Change	Mariah Robertson	Eva Respini
2012	SmellScape KCK/KCMO (2007-2012)	Sissel Tolaas	Annie Fischer
2013	A Strenuous Nonbeing	Anthony Baab	Stephen Lichty
2013	Square, Octagon, Circle	Ellie Ga	Lauren O’Neill-Butler
2013	Charlotte Street Awards Exhibition	Mike Erickson, Erika Lynne Hanson, and Paul Anthony Smith	Danny Orendorff
2014	Don’t Go Back to Sleep	Stanya Kahn	Ed Halter
2015	Tank	Glenn Kaino	Kate Hackman
2015	A Universe of Collisions	The Propeller Group	Rob Walker

== Problems and Provocations: Grand Arts 1995-2015 ==
In 2016, Grand Arts published Problems and Provocations: Grand Arts 1995-2015, co-edited by Stacy Switzer and Annie Fischer, with a foreword by Margaret Silva and an introduction by Switzer.

The book chronicles 30 of Grand Arts' projects — works by figures including Alice Aycock, Alfredo Jaar, Isaac Julien, William Pope.L, Sanford Biggers, Laurel Nakadate, Stanya Kahn, and Tavares Strachan — with archival materials and project documentation presented alongside newly written anecdotes and reflections by artists and other collaborators.

Essays by Pablo Helguera, Iain Kerr, Emily Roysdon, Gean Moreno and Rob Walker consider the models, practices and ethics of art institutions. A critical study conducted by the research studio RHEI identifies and describes Grand Arts’ unorthodox organizational model.

== Successor organization ==
In 2016, former Grand Arts associates Stacy Switzer, Lacey Wozny, Eric Dobbins and Annie Fischer relocated to Los Angeles to develop a new organization named Fathomers, similar in mission to Grand Arts but with a focus on long-term thinking and transdisciplinary practice. Fathomers' founding board members are Margaret Silva, Andrew Torrance and Glenn Kaino. The organization's first project is a seven-year collaboration with artist Michael Jones McKean.
