= Daniel Isengart =

American singer

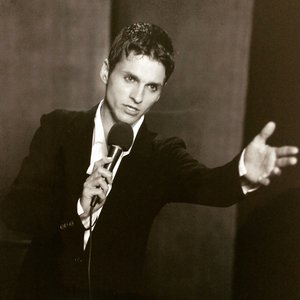
- At Don't Tell Mama 1997 in New York City.
- Born: Daniel Bienert; Munich, Germany
- Known for: Cabaret singer, writer, performance coach
- Spouse: Filip Noterdaeme

Daniel Isengart, born Daniel Bienert, is a performance coach, stage director, and culinary writer who became known as an entertainer in New York City's cabaret scene in the late 1990s.

== Performing career ==
Isengart's early years were spent in Paris and Munich before moving to New York City in 1993 to study dance and join the city's thriving art scene. In 1997, he began performing one-man shows in New York City cabarets and made a name for himself as a specialist of the European Cabaret tradition, earning residencies in downtown nightclubs such as Bar d'O (by invitation of Joey Arias) and Starlight Lounge.

From 2001 to 2008, he was featured annually at the prestigious cabaret series presented at Café Sabarsky at the Neue Galerie New York. This led to performances at venues such as BAMCafé at the Brooklyn Academy of Music, The Philadelphia Museum of Art, the Cleveland Museum of Art, the San Francisco Museum of Modern Art, and New York University's Deutsches Haus.

In 2008, he created, directed, and hosted a weekly, international variety show called Foreign Affairs, which started as a speakeasy in the loft of an artist collective in New York's Chinatown before moving on to limited runs at the Gershwin Hotel and a supper club in Soho. A version of the variety show was presented by MoMA, featuring a fashion show Isengart commissioned from the artist Machine Dazzle. Foreign Affairs culminated with a year-long residency in the lounge at the Night Hotel in Times Square, produced by Lee Chappell and co-hosted by singer Lady Rizo. In 2010, Isengart brought his cabaret-style tribute to Elvis Presley, titled The Importance of Being Elvis, to Joe's Pub, where it ran several times until 2011.

Isengart frequently collaborates with Conductor Edwin Outwater, who in 2011 invited him to guest perform with Canadian soprano Measha Brueggergosman and the Kitchener–Waterloo Symphony. In 2012, Isengart starred as the chansonnier in Heinz Karl Gruber's song cycle, Frankenstein!!, presented by Edwin Outwater and the concert:nova ensemble at the Emery Theatre. In 2020, Outwater invited Isengart to host and direct a winter series of performances of the Sun Valley Music Festival, featuring mezzo-soprano Catherine Cook.

== Directing, coaching and teaching ==
Isengart was the stage director for chanteuse Yanna Avis from 2008 to 2015. He staged his first opera, Die Fledermaus, with the Kitchener-Waterloo Symphony conducted by Edwin Outwater in 2016, and in 2018 he directed and hosted the orchestra's production of Carmen, under the baton of its new music director, Andrei Feher. Later that year, En Piste, the Canadian National Circus Alliance based in Montreal, invited Isengart to teach a group workshop about the "Art of the MC".

Isengart works as a performance coach for opera singers and is a member of the faculty of Classic Lyrics Arts in New York. He teaches courses on historical performance at New York University. He is also a board member of the web interview series Living the Classical Life, hosted by Zsolt Bognár.

In 2025, Isengart published a book for classical singers on stagecraft based on his performing experience as a cabaret artist, as well as directing and teaching opera singers.

== Culinary career ==
As a young adult, living in Munich and studying interior design at the Academy of Fine Arts, Munich, Isengart worked as chef for an Italian restaurant in the city's fashion district. Arriving in New York City in 1993, he worked for caterers such as Glorious Food and Daniel Boulud's Feast and Fêtes to support his dance studies and later began working part-time as a freelance private chef. In the 2000s he created the persona of the Foodcommander for a YouTube miniseries, wrote a food blog for The Huffington Post, and, in 2018, authored a series of articles and a cooking advice column for Slate. In 2018 he wrote a culinary memoir in the style of The Alice B. Toklas Cook Book, published by Outpost19.

== Personal life ==
Isengart is married to Belgian artist, writer, and art history professor Filip Noterdaeme, who in 2014 wrote The Autobiography of Daniel J. Isengart, an adaptation of Gertrude Stein's The Autobiography of Alice B. Toklas published by Outpost 19. They live together in Brooklyn, New York.

== Published works ==
- Isengart, Daniel (2018). The Art of Gay Cooking: A Culinary Memoir. Outpost 19. ISBN 978-1944853495.
- Isengart, Daniel (2018). Queering the Kitchen. Outpost 19. ISBN 978-1944853501.
- Isengart, Daniel (2025). Performing in Opera and Concert: A Singer's Handbook (1 ed.). New York City: Daniel Isengart. ISBN 979-8993970400.

== See also ==
- LGBT culture in New York City
- List of LGBT people from New York City
