= Museum of Capitalism =

Art museum

The Museum of Capitalism
- Year: 2015–present
- Subject: capitalism, post-capitalism

The Museum of Capitalism is an institution dedicated to "educating this generation and future generations about the history, philosophy, and legacy of capitalism, through exhibitions, research, publication, collecting and preserving material evidence, art, and artifacts of capitalism, and a variety of public programming." It "looks at our current economic system as if it were a relic of the past" and is dedicated to looking back on capitalism in order to analyze and historicize it. Versions of the exhibition — a collection of objects, artefacts, installations, archival documents, photos and videos on the “historical phenomenon of capitalism” have been hosted in Oakland, Boston and New York City.

== Publications ==
Museum of Capitalism (2019)

The goal of the publication, is to “educate this generation and future generations about the ideology, history and legacy of capitalism.” and features sketches and renderings of exhibits and artifacts, relevant quotations from historical sources and speculative essays on the intersections of ecology, race, museology, historiography, economics and politics.

== Featured artists, exhibitors, historians and collaborators ==
- Alexander Klose, Amy Malbeuf, Art for a Democratic Society, Ben Bigelow, Blake Fall-Conroy, Bureau d'Études, Caitlin Berrigan, Carrie Hott, Center for Genomic Gastronomy, Center for Tactical Magic, Chip Lord, Christy Chow, Claire Pentecost, CoClimate, Curtis Talwst Santiago, Dennis Palazzolo, Dread Scott, Evan Desmond Yee, Finger Pointing Worker/Kota Takeuchi, Fran Ilich, Futurefarmers, Gabby Miller, Helen Mayer Harrison and Newton Harrison, Igor Vamos, Jasper Waters, Jennifer Dalton, Jenny Odell, Jesse Sugarmann, Jordan Bennett, Kambui Olujimi, Kate Haug, Kelly Jazvac, Marisa Jahn, Mark Curran, Michael Mandiberg, Michelle de la Vega, Oliver Ressler, Packard Jennings, Patricia Reed, Rimini Protokoll, Sadie Barnette, Sayler / Morris, Sharon Daniel, Steven Cottingham, Superflex, Tara Shi, Taraneh Hemami, Temporary Services, Tiare Ribeaux and Donald Hanson, Tim Portlock, Valeria Mogilevich

Plus a special exhibition "American Domain," curated by Erin Elder, featuring the following artists: Bruce Nauman, Chip Thomas, Chris Ballantyne, Chris Collins, Christine Howard Sandoval, Erika Osborne, Jesse Vogler, Terri Warpinski, Tom Miller, Winter Count (Cannupa Hanska Luger, Nicholas Galanin, Merritt Johnson, Dylan McLaughlin, Ginger Dunnill).
