= All Power to the People: Black Panthers at 50 =

All Power to the People: Black Panthers at 50 was an exhibition hosted by the Oakland Museum of California (OMCA) from October 8, 2016, to February 26, 2017. The exhibit was organized by OMCA's senior curator René De Guzman.

== About ==
The exhibition celebrated the 50th anniversary of the founding of the Black Panther Party, combining objects which examine lesser known works of the Black Panther party, such as the Free Breakfast for School Children Program and, founders Huey Newton and Bobby Seale's, Ten-Point Program, with pieces of contemporary art by artists whose work inspires questions about racial inequality 50 years later.

Power to the People featured work by contemporary artists Sadie Barnette, Hank Willis Thomas, Carrie Mae Weems, Akinsanya Kambon (Mark Teemer), Trevor Paglen and David Huffman, among others.

== Historical objects ==
- Afro-American Solidarity with Oppressed People of the World – poster of a warrior by Minister of Culture for the Black Panther Party 1967–1980, Emory Douglas.
- Huey Newton photograph – the iconic image of Huey Newton enthroned in a wicker chair composed by Eldridge Cleaver and photographed by Blair Stapp in 1967.
- Jail Door – door to a cell that once held Black Panthers, courtesy of the Oakland Police Department.
- Oakland Panther photograph – image of chic young black man, holding a rifle, in front of the Oakland Police Department
- Ten Point Platform and Program – the rough draft, handwritten by Bobby Seale in 1966, of the founding document of the Black Panther Party

== Art works ==
- 100 Unarmed African Americans Killed by Police in 2014 is a list of names cut from black paper by Ellen Bepp.
- The Black Panthers: Portraits from an Unfinished Revolution is a selection of contemporary photographic images of former Black Panther Party members by Bryan Shih.
- Capture of Angela is an archival pigment print of conceptual artist Carrie Mae Weems' reenactment of the 1970 arrest of activist Angela Davis.
- MLK is an Afrofuturist painting depicting Martin Luther King Jr.'s funeral procession with black mourners in space suits by David Huffman.
- Proposal for a Monument to Huey P. Newton for the Alameda County Courthouse is a bronze sculpture by Sam Durant which replicates the wicker chair from an iconic photo of Huey Newton.
- We The People is a quilt made of prison uniforms by Hank Willis Thomas.

== Reception and criticism ==
The timely-ness of the exhibit was remarked on in several exhibition reviews. Jeff Greenwald said "From Black Lives Matter to quarterback Colin Kaepernick's bended knee, the Black Panthers' political legacy remains alive in America's ongoing dialogue about race, justice and privilege."
