= Aidas =

- Gender: Male
- Language: Lithuanian

Origin
- Meaning: "Echo"
- Region of origin: Lithuania

Other names
- Related names: Aida (feminine form)

Aidas is a Lithuanian masculine given name meaning "echo."

Notable people with the given name Aidas include:

- Aidas Bareikis (born 1967), Lithuanian artist
- Aidas Preikšaitis (born 1970), Lithuanian footballer
- Aidas Reklys (born 1982), Lithuanian figure skater
