= Erica Lord =

American artist

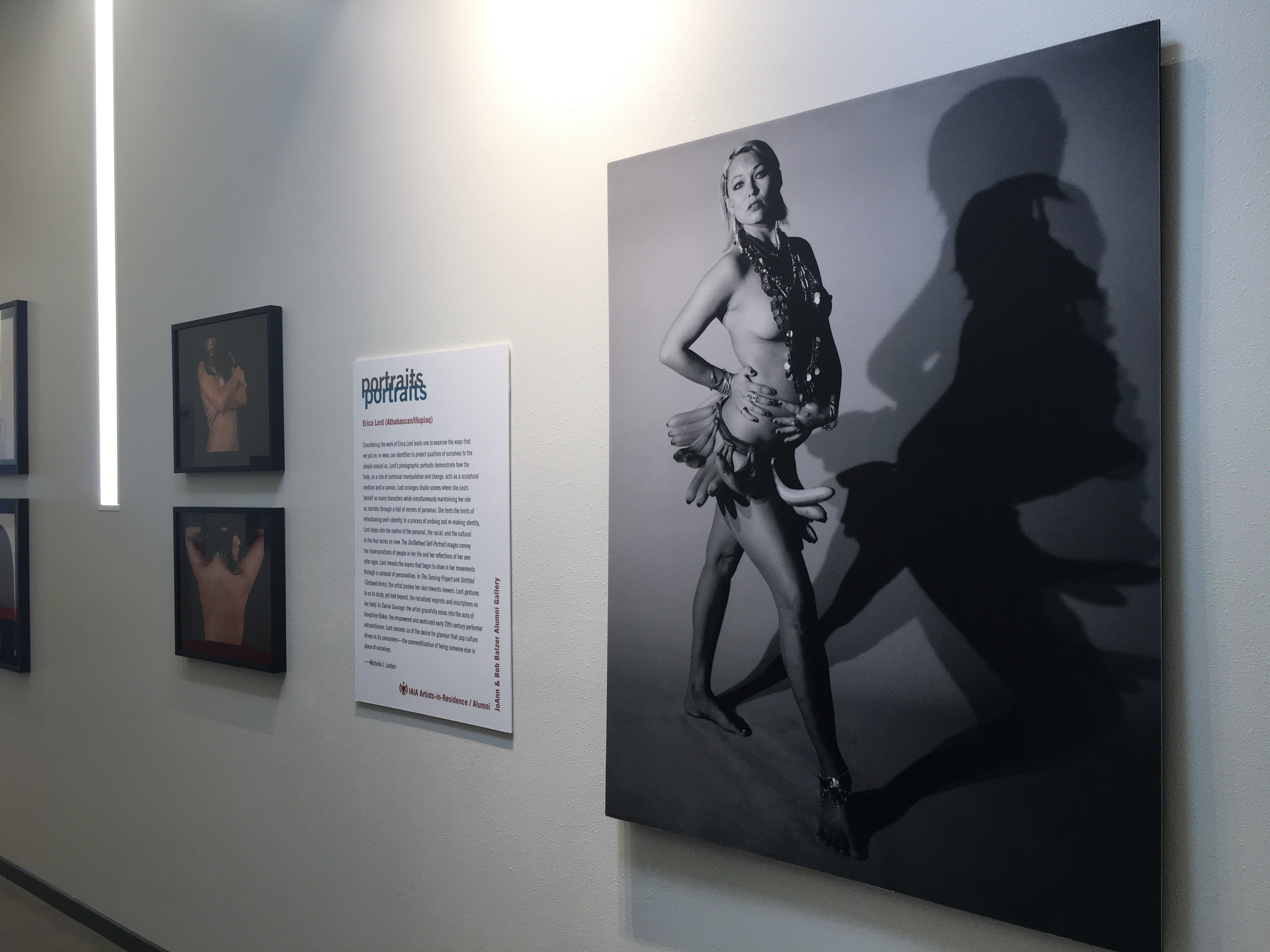
- Works by Erica Lord in Portraits/Portraits: Erica Lord and Monty Little in the JoAnn & Bob Balzer Alumni Gallery, Institute of American Indian Arts
- Born: 1978 (age 47–48); Nenana, Alaska
- Known for: Performance art, photography
- Notable work: Un/Defined Self-Portrait Series (2005), C-prints of variable dimension; (Untitled) I Tan To Look More Native (2006), digital inkjet, variable dimensions; Artifact Piece, Revisited, (2009), performance and mixed media installation
- Website: ericalord.com

Erica Lord (born 1978) is an Alaska Native artist, based in Santa Fe, New Mexico, who identifies herself as a mixed-race "cultural limbo."

== Life ==
Born to a Finnish-American mother and Iñupiaq/Athabascan father, Erica Lord grew up traveling between her father's village in Nenana, Alaska and her mother's home community in Michigan. Nenana, located in Interior Alaska, has a large Native population of 378 people, according to the 2010 census. Her mother lived in a mostly white town in Michigan's Upper Peninsula. Lord's father was an activist in the Indian movement. Her personal experience perpetually moving between various geographic places inspires her work's interest in themes of displacement, cultural identity and cultural limbo. She is a citizen of the Nenana Native Association, a federally recognized Alaska Native tribe.

She received a B.A. in liberal arts and studio arts from Carleton College in 2001 and completed her M.F.A. in sculpture and photography at The School of the Art Institute of Chicago in 2006.

== Career ==
Multiple Myeloma Burden Strap, DNA/RNA Microarray Analysis (2022) at the Renwick Gallery in 2023

Erica Lord has been an exhibiting artist since 2004, with her work having been featured in galleries and museums across the United States from Santa Fe to New York. She has exhibited her work in solo exhibitions at the DeVos Museum of Art (Marquette, MI) and the Alaska Native Arts Foundation Gallery (Anchorage, AK), as well as in group exhibitions such as the Havana Biennial and the IAIA Museum of Contemporary Native American Art. She currently teaches at the Institute of American Indian Arts where she has contributed to building some of the school's first MFA classes to launch their MFA program. During the pandemic she continued to work on her most recent project called “Burden Strap” inspired by traditional beaded burden straps and beading them in the pattern of DNA and RNA strands of diseases that affect Native American people disproportionately. From this series, “Leukemia Burden Strap” and “Multiple Myeloma Burden Strap” were featured pieces in the Sharing Honors and Burdens: Renwick Invitational 2023. Due to her profound work on Native American issues, she was one of thirteen feature artists in Self-Determined: A Contemporary Survey of Native and Indigenous Artists in 2022.

Erica Lord was a participant in the Smithsonian Archives of American Art Pandemic Oral History Project in September 2020. The oral history series recorded responses to the global pandemic across the American art world. Conducted virtually, the Pandemic Oral History Project featured eighty-five short-form interviews with a diverse group of artists, teachers, curators, and administrators, including Erica Lord.

=== Notable exhibitions ===
- 2023 Sharing Honors and Burdens: Renwick Invitational 2023, Renwick Gallery Smithsonian Institution
- 2020 Maajiigin wa’aw akiing miinawaa (Begin This World Again): Gina Adams, Erica Lord, Merritt Johnson, at Accola Griefen Fine Art, New York, NY
- 2018 The New Red Order: The Savage Philosophy of Endless Acknowledgement, Whitney Museum of American Art, New York, NY
- 2007-2017 Our people, Our land, Our images: International Indigenous Photographers, on tour through ExhibitsUSA, a national program of Mid-America Arts Alliance
- 2010 Dry Ice, Museum of Contemporary Native American Art, Santa Fe, NM
- 2009 BadLand, Institute of American Indian Arts Museum, Santa Fe, NM, An installation of prayer bundles made from the red cloth of the United States' Star Spangled Banner
- 2007 Off the Map: Landscape and the Native Imagination, Smithsonian Institution National Museum of the American Indian, New York, NY

== Selected works ==
=== Native American Land Reclamation Project (2000) ===
One of Lord's earliest projects, in 2000, focuses on her Native American roots. In her installation Native American Land Reclamation Project, she employs mixed media objects to bring awareness to the repeated cycle of broken U.S. treaties, specifically with Native Americans from 1778 to 1886. Displayed at the Institute of American Indian Arts, the installation occupied a 16" x 16" room with mirrors plastered to the walls and floor. Hanging from the ceiling are dozens of cut-up red stripes (the blood) from the United States' flag. Lord then wrapped the cloth and filled it with dirt from various villages, reservations, and tribal lands from all over the U.S. To show the repetition of history, Lord utilized the mirrors to multiply the prayer ties. In an interview, Lord explains, "I started thinking about what in my culture has been repeated over and over. [...] I wanted to create a piece that both acknowledged our history– and stressing both oppressor & survivor, Native & non-Native, it's a shared history."

=== Untitled (Tattooed Arms) (2007), Digital Photographs ===
Erica Lord photographs two tattoos: one on the inner side of her left forearm titled “Enrollment number” and one on her right forearm titled “Blood Quantum.” These two tattoos criticize the Native American image created by modern society. Lord's tattoo titled “Blood Quantum,” after the blood quantum laws, is a visual criticism on the United States government control on all Native American heritage. The tattoo “Enrollment Number” is the number given to Erica Lord, and all Native Americans, by the Bureau of Indian Affairs. Placing this number on her arm, Erica Lord draws direct comparison to Holocaust survivors and their experiences to the United States expansion and relocation of Native Americans.

=== The Tanning Project: I Tan To Look More Native (2006), Digital Inkjet, variable dimensions ===
“The Tanning Project” (2004–2007) is a four-image photographic series in which Lord applied text to her skin and then used tanning bed sessions to darken her skin, leaving the text-covered areas with a much lighter skin tone. The text and pose varies in each photograph: "Indian Looking," "Halfbreed," "Colonize Me," and "I Tan to Look More Native" and the title of each individual photograph makes use of these words. In her analysis of this series of work, Colleen Kim Daniher describes tanning, or darkening the skin through sun exposure, as a ritual of white beautification, but also points out other contexts for the word tanning, claiming the artist is “cleverly punning off of the traditional practice of transforming animal rawhide into leather through a process of skinning, liming, drying, and stretching.” The words I Tan to Look More Native critically disrupt viewers’ ideas about cultural purity and unrealistic expectations of what a Native person is supposed to look like, and the ways Native individuals engage with those expectations through their own bodily choices.

=== Artifact Piece, Revisited, (2009), performance and mixed media installation ===
On April 3, 2008, Erica Lord arrived at the George Gustav Heye Center, the National Museum of the American Indian, at the Smithsonian Museum in New York, for a performance/installation titled Artifact Piece, Revisited. This piece was a reenactment of American artist James Luna's Artifact Piece, first performed at the San Diego Museum of Man in 1987. When Lord entered the gallery, she lay down in a case, closed her eyes, and allowed museum visitors to examine her over the next few hours. Captions placed throughout the display identified parts of her, such as her painted toenails. There were two glass cases on either side of the box where Lord laid, that contained clothing and her personal possessions. One side contained Alaskan Native dress, and the other contained modern clothing. This first performance of Artifact Piece, Revisited was followed by lectures and a discussion with Lord herself. The artist returned to the museum to perform the piece again twice over the next two days. Using her body as a conversation piece, Lord critiqued the displaying of Native people in museum exhibits and the display of women's bodies.
