= Jeanine Oleson =

American artist

- Born: April 9, 1974 (age 52); Astoria, Oregon, United States
- Education: BFA, Art Institute of Chicago MFA, Rutgers University Skowhegan School of Painting and Sculpture
- Website: http://www.jeanineoleson.com

Jeanine Oleson (born April 9, 1974) is an American interdisciplinary artist working with images, materials and language that she forms into complex and humorous objects, performances, film, video, sound, and installation. Oleson's work explores themes including audience, language, land/site, music, and late Capitalist alienation

== Early life and education ==
Oleson attended Astoria High School, Clatsop Community College, School of the Art Institute of Chicago (BFA 1995), Rutgers University (MFA 2000), and Skowhegan School of Painting and Sculpture (2000). Oleson has exhibited and performed at venues including: Hammer Museum, LA (2017); Commonwealth and Council, LA (2012/2017); Atlanta Contemporary, Atlanta (2016); SculptureCenter, NY (2016); Pierogi, Brooklyn (2015), New Museum, NY (2014); Exit Art, NY (2012); Beta Local, San Juan, Puerto Rico (2012); X-Initiative, NY (2010); Grand Arts, Kansas City, MO (2009); Socrates Sculpture Park, NY (2009); Diverseworks, Houston, TX (2009); L.A.C.E., Los Angeles (2006), among others.

== Career and work ==
The subject of Oleson's art is questioning and confronting big ideas. Her interdisciplinary work is marked by an interest in the conflict between contemporary life, the sensorial, and material concerns. Thinking through research and hands-on making/craft, she creates complicated, intertwined bodies of work. These large-scale projects involve performative, complex tableaux that result in responses anywhere from confusion to pleasure. Oleson's practice encompasses many different approaches to making her objects including performances, videos, installations, sound/music, art-based activism and her role as an educator. Oleson often works collaboratively.

In addition to her work as an artist, she is an Assistant Professor of Sculpture at Rutgers University. She has also taught at Parsons School of Design, Skowhegan School of Painting and Sculpture, Sarah Lawrence College, NYU, MICA, and the University of Iowa.

Oleson is also a lead collaborator since 2013 on a participatory project, Photo Requests from Solitary that provides images to people held in solitary confinement and supports efforts to end the practice in US prisons and jails. Her collaborators are Jean Casella and Laurie Jo Reynolds.

== Exhibitions ==
Selected exhibitions include the following.

- 2017 Can you feel it?, Commonwealth & Council, Los Angeles, CA
- 2017 Conduct Matters, Hammer Project, Hammer Museum, Los Angeles, CA, May 6-August 6, curated by Connie Butler and Emily Gonzalez-Jarrett
- 2016 The Voice, Coreana Museum of Art, Seoul, S. Korea, curated by Jieun Seo 2016
- 2016 It Can Howl, Atlanta Contemporary, Atlanta, GA, curated by Daniel Fuller
- 2015 The Eccentrics, SculptureCenter, Queens, NY, curated by Ruba Katrib
- 2015 Destroy, she said, Pierogi, Brooklyn, curated by Saul Anton and Ethan Spigland
- 2014 A Sea Change Into Lands Rich and Strange, Abrons Art Center, curated by Amanda Parmer
- 2014 Hear, Here, residency/exhibition/public programs, New Museum, New York, NY, curated by Johanna Burton
- 2014 Still Acts, La Mama Galleria, NY, curated by Ian Daniels and Sara Reisman

== Awards ==
Selected awards and grants include the following.

- 2017-2018 GIDEST Fellow, The New School
- 2016 Rema Hort Mann Artist Community Engagement Grant for Photo Requests from Solitary
- 2015 Creative Capital Artist Award
- 2014 Foundation for Contemporary Art Grant
- 2009 Franklin Furnace Fellowship
- 2008/2009 Brooklyn Arts Council Community Arts Regrant
- 2005 LEF Foundation Grant
- 2000 Ford Foundation Grant
- 1999-2000 Professional Development Fellowship, College Art Association
