= Bareikis =

Bareikis is a Lithuanian surname. Notable people with the surname include:

- Aidas Bareikis (born 1967), Lithuanian artist
- Arija Bareikis (born 1966), American actress
- Osvaldas Bareikis (born 1993), Lithuanian Paralympic judoka
- Vidas Bareikis (born 1986), Lithuanian actor
