= Sofía Córdova =

Puerto Rican artist (born 1985)

- Born: 1985 (age 40–41); Carolina, Puerto Rico
- Education: California College of the Arts, San Francisco; International Center of Photography, New York; St. John's University, New York
- Website: www.sofiacordova.com

Sofía Córdova (born 1985) is a Puerto Rican mixed media artist based in Caguas, Puerto Rico and Oakland, California. She has exhibited internationally, and her artwork is held in the permanent collection of the Whitney Museum of American Art.

== Biography ==
Sofía Victoria Córdova was born in Carolina, Puerto Rico, in 1985. She works in performance, video, sound, music, installation, photography, and sometimes taxidermy. With her work, she explores a multitude of themes and, "considers sci-fi as alternative history, dance music's liberatory potential, the internet, colonial contamination, mystical objects, and extinction and mutation as evolution, within the matrix of class, gender, race, late capitalism and its technologies." She also works as one half of the conceptual music group Xuxa Santamaria. She currently lives between Caguas, Puerto Rico and Oakland, California.

== Education ==
Sofía Córdova received an AA in photography and biology from Bard College at Simon's Rock in Massachusetts in 2003. In 2006, she received a BFA from St. John's University in Queens, and then an MFA from the California College of the Arts in 2010. She also completed certificate program at the International Center for Photography in New York.

== Music ==
In 2009, Sofía Córdova and her college friend (now husband), Matt Gonzalez Kirkland, formed Xuxa Santamaria, a conceptual dance music group. Their first album (released in 2011), ChuCha Santamaria y Usted, features a linear narrative about colonialism, immigration, and assimilation. Xuxa Santamaria's style is a mix of Latin freestyle, disco, Caribbean, and post-colonial progressive commentary. Their second album, Billionaire Rainbow (released in 2015), is about money and power. Xuxa Santamaria's recent album, Chancletas D’Oro, focuses on female narratives in both history and fiction.

== Artwork ==
Córdova artwork tries to focus on themes of "slipperiness," which it does by using Science fiction and Realism to explore a variety of genres, including Feminist art, Queer art, Afrofuturism, and Environmental art, with her recent focus being on climate change. Her art has been described as existing in all those spaces and none of them at the same time, blurring their meaning and combining ideas so inexhaustibly that it can't be pinned down.

=== The Gentle Voice That Talks To You Won't Talk Forever ===
The Gentle Voice That Talks To You Won't Talk Forever (2017) is a solo exhibition composed of resin casts, ceramics, found objects, and taxidermy, produced for the City Limits Gallery in Oakland, CA. The work presents a representation of a near-future Earth in which nature has outlasted humanity. It originated from Córdova's research into the resilience of plants following nuclear events, with special focus on the Miharu Takizakura. Critic Matther Tedford described it as both a warning and a taunt that the Earth doesn't need humans, and a message to the world to prioritize the preservation of the people and environments over the current priorities he feels humanity has.

=== Where Thieves Go After Death ===
Where Thieves Go After Death (2017) was produced for the Arizona State University Museum Project Space as part of ASU Museum's International Residency Program. Córdova stated that she arrived planning to make work about the desert, but instead continued to focus on ideas of depopulated spaces seen in her previous work, which was further amplified by the impact of Hurricane Maria in Puerto Rico. The exhibition consists of printed screenshots of text conversations with family in Puerto Rico, pieces of desert in containers around the room, and an original video titled SIN AGUA that shows footage from Hollywood films, the life of cacti, Hurricane Mario, and social media posts.

== Solo exhibitions ==
- 2021 Sofía Córdova: Videos, Alabama Contemporary, Mobile, AL
- 2019 Green Grass, with Dionne Lee, Lane Meyer Projects, Denver, CO
- 2018 A las mil maravillas/ In the Thousand Wonders, Kate Werble Gallery, New York, NY
- 2017 The Gentle Voice That Talks To You Won't Talk Forever, City Limits Gallery, Oakland, CA
- 2015 Fallout, with Charlie Leese, McLoughlin Gallery, San Francisco, CA
- 2015 Bilongo Esmeralda (Let The Devil Take Style), Pro Arts, Oakland, CA
- 2014 Every Night I Tell Myself I Am the Cosmos, Royal Nonesuch Gallery, Oakland, CA
- 2011 Baby, Remember My Name, PlaySpace Gallery, San Francisco, CA

== Collections ==
- Kadist, San Francisco, CA
- Whitney Museum of American Art, New York, NY
- Pier 24 Photography, San Francisco, CA

== Performances ==
- 2018 Song4Sanctuary, Commission for San Francisco Art Commission, City Hall, San Francisco, CA
- 2017 BILONGO LILA: Nobody Dies in a Foretold War, Mills College Art Museum, Oakland, CA
- 2016 ARMY OF DARKNESS, Part of Heavy Breathing in collaboration with the Berkeley Art Museum, held off site at the Starline Social Club Oakland, CA
- 2015 Odas Al Fin De Los Tiempos (Test # 4), Counter Currents, She Works Flexible, Organized by the University of Houston’s Cynthia Woods Mitchell Center for the Arts, Houston, TX
- 2014 Untitled (Live Screen Test #1), SOMArts, San Francisco, CA
- 2013 Low Down + Spread Wide, SFMOMA, San Francisco, CA
- 2012 LOOP, in collaboration with Helena Producciones, SFMOMA + Galeria de la Raza, San Francisco, CA

== Honors and awards ==
- Creative Capital Award, New York, NY 2024
- Fundación Ama Amoedo Grant, Uruguay, 2023
- Artadia Award, San Francisco, CA, 2023
- Eyebeam Residency, New York, NY, 2020
- Creative Work Fund Grant, 2019 - 2021
- Signals From the West: Merce Cunningham at 100, Commission + Residency, SFMOMA Open Space + Hope Mohr Dance Co. + M. Cunningham Trust, 2019
- Villa Lena Residency, Palaia, Italy, 2018
- Headlands Center for the Arts Residency, Sausalito, CA, 2018

== Publications ==
- Photographers Looking at Photographs, Pier 24 Photography, San Francisco, CA, 2019.
- Solar Flare Catalog, Torrance Art Museum, Torrance, CA, 2018.
- Sabbath Catalog, Contemporary Jewish Museum, San Francisco, CA, 2017.
- Buried in the Mix Catalog, MEWO Kunsthalle, Memmingen, Germany, 2017.
- Sonic Futures Catalog, San Jose Institute of Contemporary Art, San Jose, CA, 2017.
- CIVIC 2, VHS, Colpa Press, 2016.
- 3d Additivst Cookbook, Editors/Lead Artists: Morehshin Allahyari + Daniel Rourke, 2016.
- Directions Given, Directions Taken Catalog, Southern Exposure, 2015.
- 2x2 Solos: Bilongo Esmeralda (Let The Devil Take Style) Catalog, ProArts, 2015.
- Hour After Reader, Carrie Hott, Colpa Press + Interface Gallery, 2015.
- Enciclopedia Infinita/ Infinite Encyclopedia Volumen I / Volume I (Monograph)., DeMerritt/Pauwels Editions, 2014.
- Finos Detalles Catalog, San Francisco, CA, 2012.
- Super Pop Up Shop Catalog, San Francisco, CA, 2012.
