= Sadie Barnette =

American artist

- Born: 1984 (age 41–42); Oakland, California, U.S.
- Education: Skowhegan School of Painting and Sculpture; California Institute of the Arts; University of California, San Diego
- Occupation: Visual artist
- Known for: Drawing, photography, large-scale installation exploring Black life
- Website: http://www.sadiebarnette.com

Sadie Barnette (born 1984), is an American artist who works primarily with drawing, photography, and large-scale installation. Her work explores Black life, personal histories, and the political through material explorations. She lives in Oakland, California.

== Early life ==
Sadie Barnette was born in 1984 in Oakland, California. Barnette's father Rodney Ellis Barnette, was a member of the Black Panther Party who founded the Compton, California chapter in 1968. After founding the chapter, the FBI put Rodney Barnette on the Counterintelligence Program watchlist (COINTELPRO). This FBI program "had successfully carried out a complex network of operations aimed to discredit, dismantle, and destroy Black radical activists, organizations, and movements." As a result, his everyday movements and activities were under constant surveillance. He was ultimately fired from his job at the United States Postal Service as a result of his activities. Her father's involvement with the Black Panthers and the FBI files have, and continue to, influence her work.

In 2016, her family gained access to her father's 500 page FBI file through the Freedom of Information Act. Since then, Barnette has used the file as raw material for her work. The file includes various family documents including: family trees, names of relatives, birthdays, military awards, and interviews with her father's employers, high school teachers, and his childhood neighbors. Also,

"there were pages detailing Barnette’s movements, his work with fellow activists Angela Davis, John and Ericka Huggins; there were notes from former FBI agent James W. McCord, Jr., who was later arrested for his own role in the Watergate scandal; there was testimony from neighbors, coworkers, who roundly praised his character; there was family history: the birthdates of his siblings, the place where his mother was born. As jarringly intimate as the files sometimes felt, the gulf between the FBI’s portrayal of Barnette’s life and the reality and fullness of it was staggering."

In 2016, Barnette created an installation titled Do Not Destroy which featured selections from the files. This work debuted at the Oakland Museum of California as part of its exhibition All Power to the People: Black Panthers at 50. The installation Do Not Destroy then traveled to the "Baxter St at the Camera Club of New York" and became the artist's first solo exhibition in New York City.

== Education ==
Barnette holds a BFA degree from the California Institute of the Arts (2006), and an MFA degree in Visual Arts from the University of California, San Diego (2012). Her MFA thesis was titled Everything, All the Time, Always, Forever, Still. The written component of this exhibition was an experimental text which Barnette wrote aimed to "use the written word to generate an experience for the reader that functions similarly to one's experience of actually viewing the corresponding art exhibition."

She attended the Skowhegan School of Painting and Sculpture in 2018.

== Work ==
Barnette's work takes various forms and uses a variety of media, including drawing, photography, and large-scale installation to explore the relationship between her personal history, black history, US history, and the political. Through the use of found objects, glitter, gold frames, text, family photographs, and her father's (Rodney Barnette) FBI files, her work links her personal and family story to a national and political history. In E-Flux Journal #79, Sampada Aranke writes,

For Barnette, her father’s FBI file becomes the source material through which she materializes the complex politics of inheritance between black liberation struggles of the long 1960s and their impacts upon her own sense of self. Barnette mines the FBI file as a personal archive, and in so doing manipulates the documents therein towards a radical aesthetic materialization.

The exhibition Everything, Everyday at the Studio Museum in Harlem in 2015, showcased work created by Barnette during her year-long residency at the museum. Barnette exhibited, "meticulous graphite drawings of words, including names: “Uncle Rodney’s daughter,” “Luverne and Sadie’s granddaughter,” “Youngest niece of: Margaret, Vivian, Luverne, Stanley, Carl, Aubrey, Alvin, Lesley, Irwin and John.” The results, a family genealogy assembled by first-names only, feels both rigorous and casual, and potentially open-ended."

Barnette has an ongoing project titled My Father’s FBI File, 2016- in which, as reported on by ArtForum, "Barnette detourns documents from five hundred pages of surveillance – obtained by the Barnette family via the Freedom of Information Act – into text-based artworks touched with stains and semitransparent fields of aerosol paint."

In 2016, Barnette had her first solo show in New York City at the Baxter St at the Camera Club of New York, titled Do Not Destroy. For this exhibition, Barnette presented many of her father's FBI files that she intervened in with spray paint and glitter. The artist's marks on the files, "[resemble] an act of vandalism—an invaded home, reshuffled and spattered and spilled-on papers—as much as it does a daughter’s loving, slightly coy stamp on the typewritten documentation of her father’s life. [...] This is ours now, this is mine, her embellishments seem to insist; the fierce, rebellious energy of a crayoned wall or a graffiti-tagged billboard, a sort of Pink Panther mark on a Black Panther life. “I wanted to repair some of the trauma,” Barnette said.

Barnette's solo show Compland at Fort Gansevoort in New York City in 2017, included a group of five framed COINTELPRO documents, selections from her ongoing project My Father’s FBI File, 2016-, vinyl lettering, and photocollages. The title of the exhibition, Compland, invoked "a fictive space sublating Compton and Oakland, California, '90s hip-hop, and '60s Black Power." In this exhibition, as in all of her work, blackness and the African American identity and experience is explored. Chloe Wyma of ArtForum writes of Barnette's Fort Gansevoort exhibition:

Blackness – its social constructions, structures of signification, material cultures, oppressions, and modes of resistance – is pronounced and urgent in Barnette’s work. The color pink also presents again and again, from baby to bubble-gum to hot fuchsia, in the pulsating chevrons of Barnette’s tessellated photo-wallpaper that showed a child sitting in a wicker “Huey Newton” chair; in the bags of Hello Kitty cotton candy strewn around the gallery; and in an acrylic glitter bar – part object, part sculpture – installed on the third floor. Pink spelled out PRESTO DINERO (I LEND MONEY) on a Spanish-language payday loan sign, supplied the ground in the abstract painting Untitled (Black dots on pink), 2016, and popped from behind a chain-link fence embellished with Swarovski crystals in the photograph Untitled (Pink fence sparkle), 2017.

For her first major traveling exhibition, "Sadie Barnette: Dear 1968,..." (2018) Barnette pulled from her personal and family history by using family photographs and selections from the FBI files on her father Rodney Barnette, compiled on him after he joined the Black Panther Party in 1968. For this exhibition Barnette, responds to the intimate details of the FBI files by intervening in them by redacting information with stickers, paint splashes, and spray paint, while also embellishing with glitter, vinyl, and rhinestones. As reported on in Hyperallergic, "such child-like embellishments are whimsical touches that draw the viewer in, but these add-ons are only playing dress-up on much wilder realities." These interventions are an attempt to reclaim her family history. Included in the exhibition is a black and white wallpapered wall created from signatures and seals found in the file. On this wallpaper hang a pair of photographs of her father, Rodney Barnette, "in one photograph, he is in Navy uniform pre-Vietnam era. In another, his black leather jacket, turtleneck, and beret signal his role as founder of the Compton Chapter of the Black Panther party in “Untitled (Dad, 1966 and 1968)” (2016)." Through this exhibition "the work proposes changing the conditions of the world, turning the past of racial profiling into a loyal tribute to her dad."

"Sadie Barnette: Dear 1968,..." was organized by the Manetti Shrem Museum of Art at the University of California, Davis and traveled to two other venues, the Museum of Contemporary Art San Diego and Haverford College's Cantor Fitzgerald Gallery.

The first monograph of Barnette's work, Legacy & Legend, was published in 2021 by the Benton Museum of Art at Pomona and Pitzer Art Galleries, accompanying an exhibition of the same name. Also in 2021, Barnette's work was featured in the Guggenheim's exhibit, Off the Record.

In 2023, Barnette’s work was featured in a Metropolitan Museum of Art exhibit “Don't Forget to Call Your Mother.” Barnette received the 2026 Creative Capital Award in Visual Arts for her untitled project which investigates form and sociality through architecture and sculpture, rendering benches, staircases, and tables as 3D text formations.

Her work is included in the permanent collections of LACMA, Berkeley Art Museum, the California African American Museum, the Cornell Fine Arts Museum, Walker Art Center, Pérez Art Museum in Miami, Studio Museum in Harlem (where she was also Artist-in-Residence), Brooklyn Museum, and the Guggenheim.

== Awards ==
- San Francisco Artadia Awards with Carrie Hott (2017)
- Art Matters Grant (2016)
- Creative Capital Award in Visual Arts (2026)
