= Kitchener–Waterloo Symphony =

The Kitchener–Waterloo Symphony (KWS) is an orchestra based in the twin cities of Kitchener and Waterloo, Ontario, Canada. Its home venue is located at Centre In The Square in Kitchener, Ontario. The orchestra consists of 52 professional musicians under full-time contract. KWS performs close to 90 performances during a 38-week season for a combined concert audience of over 90,000. The orchestra is regularly heard across Canada on CBC Radio Two. In September 2023, the symphony abruptly halted its 2023–2024 season, citing its financial difficulties, and later declared bankruptcy. This included all concerts and other activities such as, Kitchener–Waterloo Symphony Youth Orchestra and Bridge to Music. As of late October 2024, the orchestra announced that the bankruptcy had been annulled and that they are rebuilding with a new Board of Directors.

== History ==
Glenn Kruspe founded the orchestra in 1945 to accompany the Grand Philharmonic Choir in a concert, and served as its first music director from 1945 to 1960. Frederick Pohl succeeded Kruspe and held the post from 1960 to 1970. During Pohl's tenure, the KWS Youth Orchestra was established in 1966. Raffi Armenian then became music director in 1971, and served until 1993, the longest-serving KWS music director. During Armenian's tenure, a sister ensemble to the KUW, the Canadian Chamber Ensemble (CCE), was founded, formed mainly from the principal musicians of the KWS and included flute, oboe, clarinet, bassoon, two horns, two trumpets, trombone, tuba, percussion, two violins, viola, cello and bass. The ensemble was affiliated with the Stratford Festival from 1974 to 1980, and toured throughout Canada as well as the United States Europe, and South America. The CCE was founded by the conductor and was the first major Canadian ensemble to perform in Eastern Europe after the fall of the Berlin wall. The KWS' current home hall, Centre In The Square, was built during Armenian's tenure. Armenian now has title of music director laureate with the KWS.

Chosei Komatsu followed Armenian as music director from 1993 to 1999. Martin Fischer-Dieskau held the post from 2001 to 2003. His initial KWS contract had been for three years. However, on 27 November 2003, the KWS board dismissed Fischer-Dieskau unfoundedly from his post about the dispute of a planned orchestra trip abroad. This decision did not stand up to the protests of the community and the board had to resign in its entirety. Out of consideration for the colleagues who had been voted out of office, a newly elected board set conditions for re-employment that proved unacceptable to Fischer-Dieskau. A mutually satisfactory solution could not be reached either in December 2003 or in April 2004.

In early October 2006, the KWS board announced that the orchestra would be forced to declare bankruptcy on October 31 unless it was able to raise another C$2.5 million to deal with an ongoing financial crisis, due to declining audiences and reduced funding. It launched a "Save our Symphony" campaign in order to raise the funds. Having raised $2.3 million as of October 30, the symphony announced it would be able to continue operations.

Edwin Outwater began his term as music director in 2007. New programming initiatives during his tenure have included the 'Intersections' series, and collaborations with composers Mason Bates, Gabriela Lena Frank, Nicole Lizeé and Nico Muhly, authors Daniel Handler and Daniel Levitin, and rock musicians Dan Deacon and Richard Reed Parry. In February 2014, the KWS announced the extension of Outwater's contract to 2017. Outwater is scheduled to conclude his tenure at the end of the 2016–2017 season. In March 2017, the KWS announced the appointment of Andrei Feher as its next music director, effective with the 2018–2019 season.

On 19 September 2023, less than 48 hours before its 2023–2024 season was set to begin, the Kitchener–Waterloo Symphony abruptly canceled all scheduled performances, fueling speculation that the symphony had become insolvent.

On 21 September 2023, it was announced that the Kitchener–Waterloo Symphony had declared bankruptcy and had ceased all future operations. None of the musicians in the Symphony were informed of the cancellation or the impending bankruptcy of the orchestra. The Symphony blamed its demise on the "an unprecedented rise in costs following the global pandemic" and claimed that it would require $2 million in order to proceed with the season. Upon the bankruptcy, the entire Board of Directors resigned, and BDO Canada is responsible for the process. The surprise cancellation left the musicians jobless in a tight labor market, and no severance pay were offered.

On 6 June 2024, "a new Board of nine members was elected with a goal of reviving the symphony."

In October 2024, it was announced that the bankruptcy was "formally annulled by the approval by the Superior Court of Ontario of a proposal made to creditors." As a result, the Kitchener–Waterloo Symphony (KWS) has resumed its operations with a series of concerts lined up for the 2024–2025 season.

== Music directors ==
- Glenn Kruspe (1945–1960)
- Frederick Pohl (1960–1970)
- Raffi Armenian (1971–1993)
- Chosei Komatsu (1993–1999)
- Martin Fischer-Dieskau (2001–2003)
- Edwin Outwater (2007–2017)
- Andrei Feher (2018–2023)

== Discography ==
CBC Records has produced fourteen recordings of the KWS and the Canadian Chamber Ensemble (CCE) with acclaimed soloists. The 2002 CCE release, Chants d'Auvergne, includes soprano Karina Gauvin and was nominated for a Juno Award.

- Oktoberfest Operetta: Strauss - Lehár - Kálmán. M Boucher soprano, Dubois tenor, Armenian conductor. 1984. CBC SM-5045
- 'Viens, Gentille Dame' Romantic Arias for Lyric Tenor. DuBois tenor, Pedrotti bar, Armenian conductor. 1987. CBC SM-5077
- Mahler Kindertotenlieder; Rückert Lieder; Songs of a Wayfarer. Robbin mezzo, Armenian conductor. 1989. CBC SMCD-5098
- A Night in Venice, Joanne Kolomyjec and Mark DuBois. 1994. CBC SM 5000. SMCD 5126
- Canadian Trumpet Concerti, works by Hetu, Forsyth, Nimmons, Guy Few, James Thompson, Dan Warren trumpet, Armenian conductor. 1994. CBC SM 5000. SMCD 5130
- Brahms: Serenades, Armenian conductor. 1995. CBC SM 5000. SMCD 5145
- Memories of Poland, Fialkowska, Armenian conductor, et al. 1995. CBC SM 5000. SMCD 5140
- Russian Serenade, Beaver, Komatsu conductor. 2001. CBC SM 5000. SMCD 5159
