= Edwin Outwater =

American conductor from Santa Monica, California

Edwin Maurice Outwater
- Born: 12 April 1971; Los Angeles, California, U.S.
- Education: Harvard University; University of California, Santa Barbara
- Occupation: Conductor
- Organizations: Kitchener-Waterloo Symphony

Edwin Maurice Outwater (born 12 April 1971) is an American conductor.

== Biography ==
Outwater is a graduate of Harvard University, graduating cum laude in 1993 with a degree in English literature. While at Harvard, he was music director of the Bach Society Orchestra and wrote the music for the 145th annual production of the Hasty Pudding Theatricals. He subsequently continued his education at the University of California, Santa Barbara, where his instructors included Heiichiro Ohyama and Paul Polivnick. Outwater earned a master's degree in conducting from the University of California, Santa Barbara.

Outwater has served as resident conductor and associate guest conductor of the Florida Philharmonic, where he designed the Florida Philharmonic Family Series and its Music for Youth programmes. He has also been associate conductor of the Festival-Institute at Round Top (a teaching program), principal conductor of the Adriatic Chamber Music Festival in Molise, Italy, and assistant conductor of the Tulsa Philharmonic.

From 2001 to 2006, Outwater was resident conductor for outreach and education of the San Francisco Symphony. In parallel, from 2001 to 2005, he was music director of the San Francisco Symphony Youth Orchestra, where he led the orchestra in all of their concerts as well as on tour to Europe in the summer of 2004. During the tour, the orchestra made its debut at Vienna's Musikverein and the Théâtre des Champs-Élysées in Paris, and returned to Amsterdam's Concertgebouw. In 2004, Outwater's education programs received the Leonard Bernstein award for excellence in educational programming. Outwater has served as music director of the Santa Barbara Youth Symphony, and has been on the music faculties of the University of Tulsa, Idyllwild Arts Academy, and University of California, Santa Barbara.

From 2007 to 2017, Outwater was music director of the Kitchener-Waterloo Symphony. In April 2020, the San Francisco Conservatory of Music announced the appointment of Outwater as the music director of the SFCM Symphony Orchestra.

In July 2022, Outwater first guest-conducted the BBC Concert Orchestra (BBC CO) at the BBC Proms, in what was also his Proms debut. He returned to the BBC Proms and the BBC Concert Orchestra in July 2023. In June 2024, the BBC CO announced the appointment of Outwater as its next principal guest conductor, with the additional title of curator, effective from 1 September 2024.

Cultural offices
Preceded by Martin Fischer-Dieskau	Music Director, Kitchener–Waterloo Symphony; 2007–2017	Succeeded by Andrei Feher
