= Sanford Biggers =

American visual artist

- Born: United States
- Known for: Film, video, sculpture, music

Sanford Biggers is an American interdisciplinary artist who works in film and video, installation, sculpture, music, and performance. A Los Angeles native, he has lived and worked in New York City since 1999.

== Life and education ==
Biggers was born in Los Angeles, California. He is the son of a neurosurgeon, his father, and of a teacher, his mother. He received a BA from Morehouse College in Atlanta, Georgia, an MFA from the School of the Art Institute of Chicago, Illinois and attended Skowhegan School of Painting and Sculpture in 1998. Biggers says that due to a lack of art major classes at Morehouse, he was required to take the majority of his classes at the all-women Spelman College.

== Work ==
Biggers first received critical attention when his collaborative work with David Ellis, Mandala of the B-Bodhisattva II, was included in the exhibition "Freestyle", curated by Thelma Golden at the Studio Museum in Harlem in 2001. Since, his works have been presented internationally including the Tate Modern in London, the Renaissance Society in Chicago, Prospect 1 in New Orleans and the Whitney Biennial, The Kitchen and Performa 07 (curated by Roselee Goldberg) in New York. Biggers's art frequently references African-American ethnography, hip hop music, Buddhism, African spirituality, Indo-European Vodoun, jazz, Afrofuturism, urban culture and icons from Americana. He has said that he places "no hierarchy on chronology, references or media" and his work has been characterized by meditation and improvisation. He says his themes are "meant to broaden and complicate our read on American history." He also uses syncretism to highlight the interconnectedness of seemly disparate cultural practices. In order to make the viewer an active element, Biggers often turns his sculptures into performances. Having spent most of his life playing piano, this performative element frequently takes the form of music. He has collaborated on music projects with Saul Williams a.k.a. Niggy Tardust, Esthero, Martin Luther McCoy, Imani Uzuri, Rich Medina, and Jahi Sundance.

In 2014, Biggers departed from his typical medium by painting on quilts that were given to him by the descendants of slave owners.

Biggers is Affiliate Faculty at the Virginia Commonwealth University Sculpture and Expanded Media program, and was a visiting scholar at Harvard University's VES Department in 2009. He was previously an assistant professor at Columbia University's Visual Arts program.

== Recognition ==
In 2019, Biggers was inducted into the New York Foundation for the Arts Hall of Fame. In 2010, Biggers was awarded the Greenfield Prize at the Hermitage Artist Retreat, a two-year residency and commission of new work. The commission formed the centerpiece of Sanford Biggers: Codex, a 2012 solo exhibition at the Ringling Museum curated by Matthew McLendon.

In 2009 he received the William H. Johnson Prize and was one of the three finalists for the inaugural Jack Wolgin International Competition in the Fine Arts, the largest juried prize in the world to go to an individual visual artist. Biggers in 2008 received the Creative Capital Award in the discipline of Visual Arts. Biggers was an Eyebeam artist-in-residence in 2000.

In 2018 Biggers was interviewed by Vinson Cunningham, a writer for the New Yorker magazine, about his impact on contemporary political art. Also in 2018 Biggers was given an art award by the American Academy of Arts and Letters.

In 2021, Biggers received the 26th Annual Heinz Award for the Arts.

== Exhibitions ==
Source unless otherwise noted:

=== Solo ===
"Sanford Biggers" - Contemporary Art Museum St. Louis, St. Louis, Missouri. September 7 - December 30, 2018

- "Selah" — Marianne Boesky Gallery, New York, New York. September 7 - October 21, 2017
- "The Pasts They Brought with Them" — Monique Meloche Gallery, Chicago, Illinois. February 11 - April 2, 2016
- "Shuffle, Shake - Everson Museum" — Urban Video Project (UVP) and Everson Museum of Art, Syracuse, New York. November 6 - December 27, 2014
- "3 Dollars and Six Dimes" — David Castillo Gallery, Miami, Florida. May 15 - July 5, 2014
- "Vex" — Baldwin Gallery, Aspen, Colorado. June 27–20, 2014
- "Sugar, Pork, Bourbon" — Massimo De Carlo Gallery, Milan, Italy. April 5 - May 18, 2013
- "Dark Star" — Eric Firestone Gallery, East Hampton, New York. July 6–22, 2013
- "Ago" — Monique Meloche Gallery, Chicago, Illinois. April 13 - June, 2013
- "The Cartographers Conundrum" — Mass MoCA, North Adams, Massachusetts. October 2012
- "Codex" — John and Mable Ringling Museum of Art, Sarasota, Florida. March 30 - October 14, 2012
- "Sweet Funk – An Introspective" — The Brooklyn Museum, Brooklyn, New York. September 23, 2011 - January 8, 2012
- "Cosmic Voodoo Circus" — SculptureCenter, Long Island City, Queens, New York. September 10 - November 28, 2011
- "Moon Medicine" — Museum of Contemporary Arts, Santa Barbara, California. 2010
- "Blossom" — Grand Arts, Kansas City, Missouri September 7 – October 20, 2007

=== Group ===
- "Matter" — David Castillo Gallery, Miami, Florida. December 1, 2015 - January 31, 2016
- "Eight Sculptors" — Paula Copper Gallery, New York, New York November 10 –- December 22, 2012
- "2018 Ceremonial Exhibition: Work by new members and recipients of awards" - American Academy of Arts and Letters.

== Collections ==
Biggers' work is held in the following permanent collections:

- Studio Museum in Harlem
- Brooklyn Museum
- Museum of Modern Art
- Whitney Museum
- Museum of Contemporary Art Chicago
- Metropolitan Museum of Art
- Minnesota Museum of American Art
- Walker Art Center
- The Phillips Collection
