= Andrei Feher =

Romanian-Canadian conductor (born 1991)

- Born: 1991 (age 34–35); Romania
- Genres: Classical
- Occupation: Conductor
- Website: https://andreifeher.com

Andrei Feher (born 1991) is a Romanian-Canadian conductor.

== Early life ==
Born into a family of musicians in the Romanian city of Satu Mare, he began studying the violin at seven, and moved with his family to Montreal at the age of 13, where he enrolled in the Joseph-François Perrault High School.

He went on to study at the Conservatoire de musique de Montréal with Raffi Armenian, who was music director of the Kitchener-Waterloo Symphony from 1971 to 1993.

At sixteen, he was invited by Yannick Nézet-Séguin to attend rehearsals of the Orchestre Métropolitan.

== Career ==
In 2013, he was awarded the Prix-Opus Discovery of the Year and was appointed to his first position as assistant director-in-residence at the Orchestre Symphonique de Québec under Fabien Gabel, and in 2014, at 22, he was appointed assistant conductor to Paavo Järvi at the Orchestre de Paris in France.

In 2017, aged 26, he was appointed music director of the Kitchener-Waterloo Symphony, replacing outgoing music director Edwin Outwater from August 2018. His contract as the music director was extended until the end of the 2026–27 season but abruptly ended in the fall of 2023 due to the symphony's bankruptcy.

He made his debut with the BBC Symphony Orchestra at Maida Vale in a program of Stravinsky and Poulenc in June 2019. He has also conducted the Tokyo Symphony, the Norwegian Radio Orchestra, and Opéra de Lausanne.
