= Filip Noterdaeme =

Artist

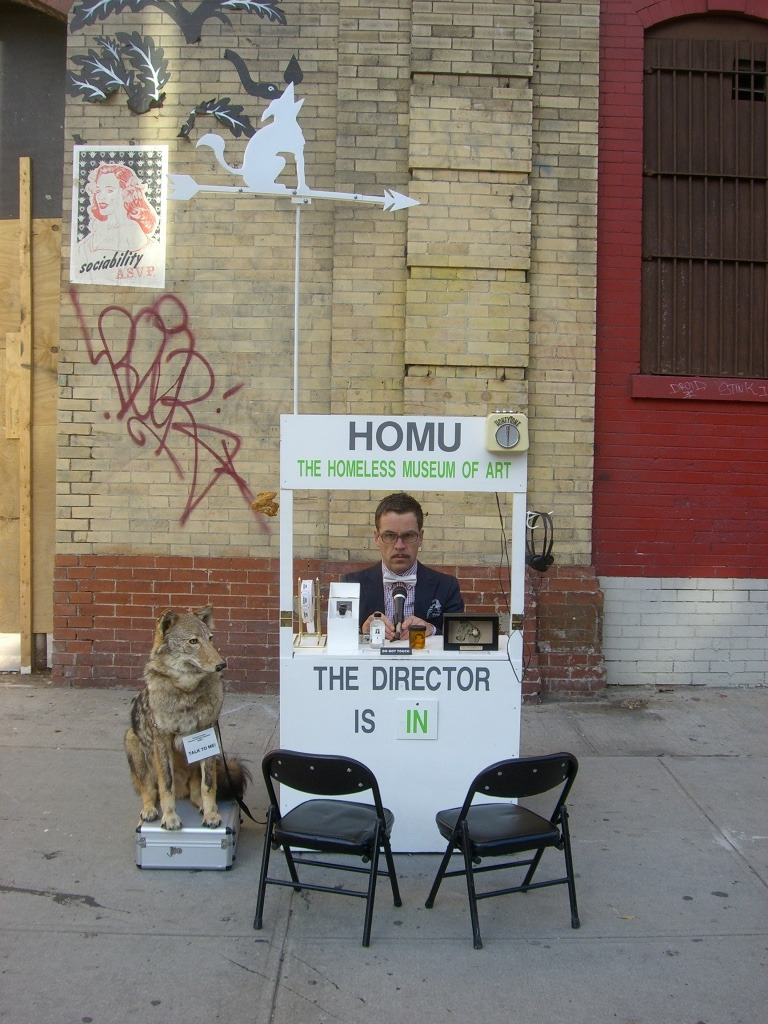
- Filip Noterdaeme as the Homeless Museum Director, a performance art live installation, March 2009, New York City.
- Born: City of Brussels
- Education: School of Visual Arts, Gallatin School of Individualized Study
- Known for: Painting, Performance Art, Satire
- Movement: Conceptual Art
- Spouse: Daniel Isengart

Filip Noterdaeme is a Belgian-born American artist, satirist and writer best known for his creation of The Homeless Museum of Art, a conceptual artwork that encompassed installation, writing and performance. His work has been explored as part of two doctoral theses, both of which were later published as books.

== Life and career ==
Noterdaeme was born in Brussels and is the son of Belgian Ambassador Paul M. J. Noterdaeme. As consequence of his father's profession, he grew up in Brussels, London and Geneva. He began his studies of visual arts at LUCA School of Arts in Brussels before moving to New York City, in 1987, where he first earned a Bachelor of Fine Arts degree at the School of Visual Arts and then enrolled at Hunter College to pursue a Master of Fine Arts (MFA).

During his time at Hunter, he frequently presented himself as an alter ego named Marcel Wasbending-Ttum, a name he concocted as an homage to Gustave Courbet and Marcel Duchamp. He additionally would satirise the institution by dressing in a Ratcatcher (attire) hunting outfit, and bringing in his Dachshund to the school, instructing it in front of faculty members to "go find a masterpiece!". Inspired by artist duo McDermott & McGough, for whom he worked as an assistant painter, he also conceived and created works of appropriation, at times employing the services of other artists. He was dismissed from Hunter following allegations of plagiarism when he exhibited a nude painting, signed as Marcel Wasbending-Ttum, that used the imagery of Gustave Courbet’s L'Origine du monde and René Magritte’s The Treachery of Images, which was viewed as scandalous.

Noterdaeme subsequently enrolled at the Gallatin School of Individualized Study, where he studied philosophy and comparative literature, and earned his MA.

In the 1990s, Noterdaeme worked for the Metropolitan Museum of Art’s outreach program, subsequently becoming a gallery lecturer and educator for their weekly children’s program, A First Look. The program was terminated in 1999. That same year, Noterdaeme was hired by The Guggenheim museum as a gallery lecturer.

In 2002, Noterdaeme created the Homeless Museum of Art (HOMU), a conceptual Gesamtkunstwerk that aimed to expose and send up the practices of contemporary art museums. Assuming the role of self-titled museum director, he presented a first version of the museum as a pop-up exhibit in an art studio in Chelsea and wrote letters to leading figures of cultural institutions, offering tongue-in-cheek critique and absurdist ideas for possible collaborations. Noterdaeme’s second manifestation of the project, in 2004, was a public protest action that raised awareness about the fact that the Museum of Modern Art, following its multi-million-Dollar expansion, had hiked its admission fee by 63%. In 2005, the Swiss Institute Contemporary Art New York exhibited a new incarnation of HOMU at the Armory Show, presented as a makeshift booth inspired by Lucy’s Psychiatry Booth from Charles M. Schulz’ Peanuts comic strip series. It included a tour of Noterdaeme's apartment in Brooklyn that he and his partner Daniel Isengart had turned into a live-in pastiche of a contemporary art museum, including a guided audio tour, shop, café and a “Staff And Security Department,” where Noterdaeme, wearing a fake beard, and introducing himself as HOMU's Director, held court in the style of Louis XIV's lever, using a Taxidermy Coyote to represent his press secretary.

Noterdaeme and Isengart continued to hold monthly, semi-public openings at the apartment for several years, until their landlord found out about it via a New York Times article and notified the couple that they were not legally entitled to use their rental apartment as an art museum. Noterdaeme closed down the museum and subsequently created an updated mobile booth version of the museum that he regularly took to the streets of Manhattan from 2008 to 2012, culminating with a residency at the High Line in Chelsea.

In 2013, Noterdaeme wrote a memoir,The Autobiography of Daniel J. Isengart, an adaptation of Gertrude Stein's The Autobiography of Alice B. Toklas which was published by Outpost 19. In drawing parallels between his life with his husband Daniel Isengart and the life of Stein and Toklas, Noterdaeme explored the concept that a person's life in of itself can be a work of art. He terms the writing of the memoir, “homoplagiarism”, combining homosexuality with an illicit form of writing. The following year he published a literary adaptation of Howl (poem), Allen Ginsberg’s legendary first collection of poems, which Noterdaeme titled "Growl: and other poems", dedicated to writer Andrew Solomon. Noterdaeme detailed his creative process of writing the adaptation in an essay published on the Queen Mob's Teahouse blog.

Noterdaeme wrote a series of articles about the contemporary art scene for The Huffington Post, now HuffPost which were published in 2017.

Noterdaeme is presently an Adjunct professor at New York University, where he teaches the Art of Europe. He continues to be a gallery lecturer at The Guggenheim Museum and is an assistant professor of Art History at the John Jay College of Criminal Justice, a senior college of the City University of New York.

== Published works ==
- Noterdaeme, Filip (2011). Lettre à un religieux. New York: La Bibliothèque Fantastique.
- Noterdaeme, Filip (2012). Madame Bovary. New York: La Bibliothèque Fantastique.
- Noterdaeme, Filip (2012). Cat - A log - Raisin - "A" [Catalogue raisonné]. New York: La Bibliothèque Fantastique.
- Noterdaeme, Filip (2013). The Autobiography of Daniel J. Isengart (1 ed.). Outpost19. ISBN 9781937402488.
- Noterdaeme, Filip (2016). Growl : and other poems. Paris: antoine lefebvre editions. ISBN 9782555838215.
- Noterdaeme, Filip (2020). Dear Professor: A Chronicle of Absences. Baltimore, Maryland: Punctum Books. ISBN 978-0998237589.

== See also ==
- LGBT culture in New York City
- List of LGBT people from New York City
