= Center for Tactical Magic =

American artist group

- Known for: Contemporary Art
- Notable work: Universal Keys, Magic(k) Wands, Witches' Cradles, The Tactical Ice Cream Unit, Cricket-Activated Defense System
- Website: tacticalmagic.org

The Center for Tactical Magic is an American artist group launched in 2000 and based in the San Francisco Bay Area that engages in research, development, and deployment of actions, events and community-based projects that combine art, magic and politics. In 2017, the founder of the Center was detained at San Francisco International Airport and interrogated by members of a Tactical Terrorism Response Team without explanation.

Their work has been presented at the Museum of Capitalism, Massachusetts Museum of Contemporary Art and Grand Arts.

In 2013, the group ran a Bank Heist Contest, offering $1000 for the best bank robbery proposal.
