= Mariah Robertson =

American photographer (born 1975)

Mariah Robertson (born 1975) is an American artist working primarily with experimental darkroom photography. She is known for her large-scale photograms, camera-less works, and chemically manipulated photographs that embrace unpredictability and chance. She lives and works in Brooklyn, New York.

She lives in New York City.

Robertson has exhibited work internationally including at Saatchi Gallery in London and MoMA PS1 in Long Island City. In 2015 she co-founded Situations Gallery on the Lower East Side of Manhattan where she hosted Temporal Situations, a month-long program of live and time-based events from 2016 to 2017. Her work appears on the cover of the 2016 Elton John album "Wonderful Crazy Night." She is represented by M+B Gallery in Los Angeles, and Van Doren Waxter in New York City. Robertson's work is included in the 2023-2024 exhibition The Sky's the Limit at the National Museum of Women in the Arts in Washington, D.C.

Robertson was born in Indianapolis, Indiana and spent her childhood in Sacramento, California. She was curator at Lair of the Minotaur gallery in San Francisco in the 2000s.

== Education ==
Robertson received her B.A. in 1997 from the University of California, Berkeley, and her M.F.A. in 2005 from Yale University School of Art.

== Exhibitions and performances ==
9 (2011), National Museum of Women in the Arts, Washington, D.C.

2006:

- Please lie down and take a nap with me in my grave, Guild & Greyshkul, New York City

2007:

- Nudes, Still Lives and Landscapes, Guild & Greyshkul, New York City

2009:

- Take Better Pictures, Museum 52, New York, NY
- Guild & Greyshkul, New York City Performance.
- I Am Passions, Marvelli Gallery, New York, NY

2010:

- Performance, Art Basel Miami Beach, Miami, FL. Curated by Klaus Biesenbach.
- Solo Presentation, Art Forum Berlin, Berlin
- 50 Artists Photograph the Future, Higher Pictures, New York, NY

2011:

- MoMA PS1, Long Island City, NY. Performance.
- Baltic Centre for Contemporary Art, Gateshead, UK. Solo exhibition.
- Central Utah Art Center, Ephraim, UT. Performance.
- HOT TROPICAL RAIN JAM Museum 52, New York, NY. Solo Exhibition

2012:

- Let's Change, Grand Arts, Kansas City, MO. Solo exhibition.
- Robert and Arlene Kogod Courtyard, National Portrait Gallery, Smithsonian Institution, Washington DC. Performance.
- The First Annual Artists’ Halloween Carnival and Parade, Museum of Modern Art, New York City Performance.
- New Art Dealers Alliance (NADA), New York City

2013:

- Permanent Puberty, American Contemporary, New York, NY. Solo Exhibition.

2014:

- A World of Its Own: Photographic Practices in the Studio, Museum of Modern Art, New York, NY. Group Exhibition
- What is a Photograph?, International Center of Photography, New York, NY. Group Exhibition
- Modern Alchemy: Experiments in Photography, The Heckscher Museum of Art, Huntington, NY. Group Exhibition
- Paris Photo, Los Angeles, Los Angeles, CA

2015:

- Photography Lovers’ Peninsula, M+B, Los Angeles, CA. Solo Exhibition

2016:

- Two-person exhibition with Jennie Jieun Lee, Eleven Rivington, New York, NY. Solo Exhibition.

2017:

- Chaos Power Center, 11R, New York, NY. Solo Exhibition.

2018:

- The Hydra, M+B, Los Angeles, CA. Solo Exhibition
- Fun Packed Holiday, Lora Reynolds, Austin, TX

2019:

- Mariah Robertson, Swope Art Museum, Terre Haute, IN. Solo Exhibition.

2020:

- Summer Selection 2020, Galerie Miranda, Paris, FR. Group Exhibition.
- Repetition and Difference, Van Doren Waxter, New York City. Solo Exhibition.

2021:

- Repetition & Difference, M+B, Los Angeles, CA. Solo Exhibition.

== Residency ==
- 2011: Central Utah Art Center
- 2016, MacDowell Colony

== Collections ==
Robertson's work is held in the following permanent public collections:

- Los Angeles County Museum of Art, CA
- Museum of Modern Art, New York City
- North Carolina Museum of Art, Raleigh, NC: 1 item (as of June 2018)
- Whitney Museum of Art, New York, NY
