= Annie Lapin =

American artist (born 1978)

- Born: Annie Lapin; 1978 (age 47–48); Washington, DC
- Education: BA from Yale University, MFA from UCLA
- Known for: Painting

Annie Lapin (born 1978) is an American artist who lives and works in Los Angeles, California. Her abstract paintings are grounded in representation.

== Early life and education ==
Although born in Washington D.C., Lapin spent most of her early years in Kentucky. She received her BA from Yale University in 2001, and completed an MFA at the University of California, Los Angeles, in 2007.

== Exhibitions ==
Lapin has had solo exhibitions at Grand Arts in Kansas City, Missouri (2008), at the Pasadena Museum of California Art (2009), at the Museum of Contemporary Art Santa Barbara (2012), and at the Weatherspoon Art Museum of the University of North Carolina at Greensboro, where was Falk Visiting Artist in 2013–2014.
