= Chosei Komatsu =

Japanese conductor (born 1958)

- Born: March 1, 1958; Japan Fukui
- Other name: 小松 長生
- Occupations: violinist, composer
- Website: Official Website

Chosei Komatsu (小松 長生, Komatsu Chōsei; born March 1, 1958) is a Japanese conductor who, from 2003 to 2010, was artistic director of Orquesta Sinfónica Nacional de Costa Rica. Also, after five years as music director of Japan’s Central Aichi Symphony Orchestra, he assumed the title of Conductor Laureate.

== Biography ==
Komatsu previously held the posts of Principal Conductor of Tokyo Philharmonic Orchestra and Japan Shinsei Symphony Orchestra, Music Director of Takefu International Music Festival, Music Director of Kitchener-Waterloo Symphony and Canadian Chamber Ensemble, Principal Guest Conductor of Lviv State Opera and Ballet, Associate Conductor of Baltimore Symphony Orchestra, and Exxon/Arts Endowment Conductor of Buffalo Philharmonic Orchestra.

He has conducted orchestras, opera and ballet on four continents, including Montreal Symphony Orchestra, Moscow Radio Symphony Orchestra, Bolshoi Theater Orchestra, St. Petersburg Symphony Orchestra, Prague Radio Symphony Orchestra, Kiev National Philharmonic Orchestra, Kiev National Opera, Kölner Rundfunk-Sinfonie-Orchester, Seoul Philharmonic Orchestra, Japan Philharmonic Orchestra, New Japan Philharmonic Orchestra, Compañía Lírica Nacional de Costa Rica, and Orquesta Sinfónica de Venezuela.

Chosei Komatsu has collaborated with numerous international solo artists, such as violinists Joshua Bell, James Ehnes, Hilary Hahn, Cho-Liang Lin, Midori Goto, Gil Shaham; cellist Jian Wang; and pianists Leon Fleisher, Lang Lang, Roger Wright, Jeffrey Kahane, Ikuyo Kamiya, Yu Kosuge, and Michie Koyama.

In 2005, Chosei Komatsu led Orquesta Sinfónica Nacional de Costa Rica on tour in Japan, in celebration of the 70th Anniversary of diplomatic relations between those two countries. As part of the Japanese government’s official cultural outreach program, Central Aichi Symphony Orchestra was selected to tour China with Mtro. Komatsu in 2007.

Among the many recordings to Mtro. Komatsu’s credit are two CDs with Orchestra Ensemble Kanazawa, released in 2006 on the Sony Classical label. His 2004 recording of Akira Senju’s Piano Concerto "Shukumei", with Japan Philharmonic Orchestra and Kentaro Haneda, remains the best-selling classical CD in the history of Japan. His gala concert with Tokyo Philharmonic, soprano Stefania Bonfadelli and baritone Renato Bruson was released on DVD in 2003. Mtro. Komatsu has also recorded for the Columbia, BMG-Victor, EMI and CBC labels, with the Moscow Radio Symphony Orchestra, Canadian Chamber Ensemble, and Kitchener-Waterloo Symphony.

A native of Japan, Chosei Komatsu earned a Bachelor of Literature degree in aesthetics from University of Tokyo and a Doctor of Musical Arts degree in orchestral conducting from Eastman School of Music in Rochester, New York. He was awarded the Leonard Bernstein Conducting Fellowship at the Schleswig-Holstein Music Festival in Germany and the Aspen Music Festival and School Conducting Fellowship in the United States. His primary conducting teachers were David Zinman, David Effron, Donald Neuen, and Eiichi Ito, and he took further studies with Kurt Masur, Max Rudolf, and Leonard Bernstein.

Chosei Komatsu currently lives in Hawaii, USA, and in Tokyo, Japan.
