= Julia Solis =

American writer and photographer

Julia Solis is a writer and photographer who investigates ruined urban spaces. She is the founder of two arts organizations: Dark Passage and Ars Subterranea, both of which are dedicated to exploring and exposing New York City's ruins and underground spaces.

Solis wrote the book New York Underground and her photography book Stages of Decay (Prestel, 2013) shows abandoned American and European theaters. She is the executive producer of the film American Ruins.

== Publications ==
=== Publications by Solis ===
- Funeral Play. Artist book on wood veneer and video for Anthology Film Archives.
- Scrub Station. Koja, 2006. ISBN 978-0970722423. Short stories.
- New York Underground: The Anatomy of a City. Routledge, 2007. ISBN 978-0415963107.
- Stages of Decay. Prestel, 2013. ISBN 978-3791348193. Photographs.

=== Publications with others ===
- Dead Rollers. Collaboration with Tom Kirsch for Proteus Gowanus.
- Tales from the Sanatorium. Graphic novel in collaboration with Bryan Papciak and Ars Subterranea.
- Irma. Collaboration with Tom Kirsch, Furnace Press.

== Films ==
- American Ruins – executive producer

== See also ==
- Ruins photography
- Urban exploration
