= Carrie Hott =

American interdisciplinary artist

Carrie Hott is an interdisciplinary artist, researcher, and educator based in Oakland, California. Hott’s multidisciplinary projects often take the form of multi-media installations that incorporate drawings, prints, books, sound, video or performance in sculptural settings. Her research-based practice focuses on technological mediation and systems that are difficult to access, visualize, or understand.

Active as an arts administrator, curator, and educator, Hott is currently an assistant professor in Graphic Design in the Eskenazi School of Art, Architecture, and Design at Indiana University Bloomington. She is a co-founder of the Royal None Such Gallery in Oakland, California, an alternative art and community event space; she also helped co-found the Ortega y Gasset Projects, an artist-run exhibition space in Bushwick, Brooklyn. She is a former board member at Headlands Center for the Arts in Sausalito, California.

== Early life ==
Hott was born in Fort Collins, Colorado, and grew up in Arizona, Colorado, and California. She received her BFA in Painting with a minor in Psychology from Arizona State University in 2003, and her MFA from the San Francisco Art Institute in 2007.

In addition to her studio practice, Hott is a faculty member in the University of San Francisco’s department of Art + Architecture, is a visiting lecturer in the Art Practice Department at UC Berkeley and in the past has been a Lecturer San Jose State University.

== Exhibitions & Projects ==
Hott's work has been presented in exhibitions including Southern Exposure, the Oakland Museum of California, the Santa Cruz Museum of Art and History, the Museum of Capitalism, and the International Symposium on Electronic Arts in New Mexico. Hott was also part of the Bay Area Now 8 exhibition at San Francisco’s Yerba Buena Center for the Arts and her project, The Key Room, is a permanent installation at the Headlands Center for the Arts.

Hott has been an artist-in residence at Recology San Francisco and at Mills College. In 2024 she was an artist-in-residence at the Center for Spaceflight Research at the University of California, Davis as part of the China Shop residency. She is currently working on a long-term web-based collaboration with The Lab, an experimental art and performance space in San Francisco’s Mission District. Additionally, Hott contributed to an essay and photo project in the latest Living Room Light Exchange publication: Rare Earth The Ground is Not Digital which was released October 2020.

== Awards ==
Hott was a recipient of the 2017 Artadia Award in San Francisco, and was named one of 24 Artists to Watch in 2015 by Modern Painters Magazine. Her work has been reviewed in Art Practical, Artslant, and Whitehot Magazine of Contemporary Art.
