= Pauline Stella Sanchez =

Pauline Stella Sanchez is a theoretical artist/visual essayist and Professor of Art, Film and Critical Studies at the Art Center College of Design, (ACCD). Sanchez received a John Simon Guggenheim Fellowship for Sculpture/Installation in 2003, Foundation Cartier pour lʼArt Contemporain, Residency 1990, National Endowment for the Arts Painting Fellowship, 1989, Credac Artists International Award, France, 1989 and multiple Great Teaching Awards at Art Center to include two in 2002, 2001, two in 2000, and 1999.
