= Catherine Chalmers =

American artist and photographer

- Born: July 7, 1957 (age 68); San Mateo, California, US
- Education: Stanford University, Royal College of Art
- Known for: Photography, video & sculpture
- Awards: Guggenheim Fellowship

Catherine Chalmers (born July 7, 1957), is an American artist, photographer and filmmaker. She lives and works in New York City.

== Biography ==
Catherine Chalmers was born in 1957 in San Mateo, California. Chalmers graduated from Stanford University with a B.S. degree in Engineering in 1979, and from the Royal College of Art, with an M.F.A. degree in Painting.

She has exhibited at MASS MoCA, Corcoran Gallery of Art, Yerba Buena Center for the Arts, Museum of Contemporary Photography, the University Art Museum of CSU Long Beach; and Boise Art Museum.

Her work has appeared in the New York Times, ArtNews, Blind Spot, Harper's, and Discover. Her work has been featured on PBS, and This American Life.

== Awards ==
- 2008, Jury Award (Best Experimental Short) for her film "Safari", SXSW Film Festival.
- 2010, Guggenheim Fellowship, in video and audio.
- 2018, Best Environmental Short for her film "Leafcutters", Natourale Film Festival, Wiesbaden, Germany.
- 2019, Gil Omenn Art & Science Award, Ann Arbor Film Festival.
- 2019, Best Experimental Film, The Earth Day Film Festival.

== Films ==
Year	Title	Type	Notes
2008	Safari	short film	A film following a New York City cockroach.
2019	Leafcutters	short, documentary film	

== Books ==
- Sand, Michael L., ed. (2000). Food Chain: Encounters between Mates, Predators, and Prey. Catherine Chalmers (photographer), Gordon Grice (introduction). Aperture. ISBN 978-0893818852.
- Chalmers, Catherine (2004). Catherine Chalmers: American Cockroach. Aperture. ISBN 9781931788397.
