= Laurie Jo Reynolds =

American artist

Laurie Jo Reynolds is an American artist most known for her work in policy and social practice. She is a current Assistant Professor of Social Justice at the School of Art and Art History at the University of Illinois Chicago. She was awarded a Blade of Grass Fellowship for Socially Engaged Art in 2014, a Creative Capital award for Emerging Fields in 2013, and a Creative Time Annenberg Prize in 2013. Working in what she calls "legislative art," her work primarily manifests outside the gallery or museum, though she has been included in exhibitions at the Santa Monica Museum, and the Van Abbemuseum.

== Tamms Year Ten ==
In 2008, Reynolds organized the Tamms Year Ten project, in collaboration with the art historian Stephen Eisenman, attorney Jean Snyder, and poet Nadya Pittendrigh. The project sought to and led to the closure of the Tamms C-Maxx prison in 2013.

In 1998, the Tamms C-Maxx prison was opened in southern Illinois as a maximum security prison designed for prisoners to be kept in solitary confinement. The Tamms Poetry Committee was formed by a group of artists with the intention of providing social comfort to the prisoners in the form of a poetry exchange. Communications between the artist group and the prisoners uncovered a variety of awareness around inhumane conditions that the prisoners were being kept in. Reynolds, an artist who emerged as leader of the Tamms Poetry Committee, coined the term "legislative art" in order to raise awareness around the extreme solitary conditions that the prisoners were being kept in. The Tamms Year Ten project was created in 2008 to organize a formal policy campaign that eventually led to the closure of Tamms C-Maxx prison in 2013.

== Awards ==
- Open Society Foundation Soros Justice Fellowship (2010)
- Creative Capital award for Emerging Fields (2013)
- Creative Time Annenberg Prize (2013)
- Blade of Grass Fellowship for Socially Engaged Art (2014)
- Opportunity Agenda Fellowship (2015)
