= Raffi Armenian =

Armenian-Canadian musician

- Born: June 4, 1942 (age 83); Cairo, Egypt
- Occupations: Conductor, pianist, composer, teacher

Raffi Armenian, CM (born June 4, 1942) is a Canadian conductor, pianist, composer, and teacher. He directed the Kitchener–Waterloo Symphony orchestra for many years. Since 1999 he has been the director of Orchestral Studies at the University of Toronto. From 2008 to 2011 he was the director of the Conservatoire de musique du Québec à Montréal.

== Early life and education ==
Armenian was born in Cairo and had his first music lessons there, moving in 1959 to Vienna to study piano with Bruno Seidlhofer. After graduating, he put his musical studies aside and attended the University of London from 1962 to 1965, where he majored in metallurgy. He returned to the Vienna Academy of Music and studied from 1965 to 1969. In 1968, Armenian was one of two finalists at the International Competition for Young Conductors in Besançon, France.

== Career ==
Armenian emigrated to Canada in 1969 to become the assistant conductor of the Atlantic Symphony Orchestra, located in Halifax, Nova Scotia. From 1971 to 1993, he was the artistic director and conductor of the Kitchener-Waterloo Symphony. Under Armenian's guidance, the K-W Symphony developed from an amateur ensemble in the mid-1970s to a professional orchestra.

Armenian acted as the musical director of the Stratford Festival from 1973 to 1976, and founded the Stratford Festival Ensemble (later renamed the Canadian Chamber Ensemble) in 1974.

Armenian made guest-conducting appearances with the Orchestre Symphonique de Québec in 1974, the Toronto Symphony Orchestra and the National Arts Centre Orchestra in 1975, and conducted Wozzeck for the Canadian Opera Company in 1977.

In 1986, he was made a Member of the Order of Canada. In 1999 he became the director of Orchestral Studies at the University of Toronto.

Armenian taught conducting at the Conservatoire de musique du Québec à Montréal, where he directed its symphony orchestra for 30 years. He was the Conservatoire's director from 2008 until 2011.

== Selected recordings ==
- Joyous light - Armenian sacred songs with Isabel Bayrakdarian, CBC.
- Memories of Poland, 1995 with Janina Fialkowska and the Kitchener-Waterloo Symphony
- Mahler Lieder, CBC Records. Singers Andreas Schmidt and Catherine Robbin, K-W Symphony.
