= Sally Elesby =

American artist

Sally Elesby (born 1942) is an American painter. Ellesby is known for her minimalist abstract paintings employing wire and other unconventional materials. Her work is held in the permanent collections of the Whitney Museum of American Art and the Museum of Contemporary Art, North Miami.
