= ChanSchatz =

Artist duo

Eric Chan (born 1963) and Heather Schatz (born 1968) are artists based in New York City who worked collaboratively under the name ChanSchatz.

Chan was born in Tokyo and Schatz in Dallas. The couple make works based on information gathered from invited guests to their studio using a mixture of traditional and digital techniques. The collected data is transformed into large-scale paintings and silkscreened images. Their work references ideas of identity and social relationships through their openly collaborative process.

The parties filed for divorce in 2015 and were parties to a suit in Federal Court in New York, New York, regarding authorship rights.

== Selected exhibitions ==
1998

- XXIV Bienal de São Paulo, São Paulo, Brazil

1999

- The Production of Production, Apex Art Curatorial Program, New York
- Too Wide Enough, Swiss Institute New York

2000

- Representing: A Show of Identities, Parrish Art Museum, Southampton Village

2003

- City Mouse/Country Mouse, Space 101, Brooklyn
- Before and After Science, Marella Contemporary Art, Milan
- dsp.0034, Contemporary Arts Forum, Santa Barbara

2004

- Multiple Strategies, Contemporary Arts Center, Cincinnati

2006

- Mutiny, The Happy Lion, Los Angeles
- Here and There, Massimo Audiello, New York

2007

- Blood Meridian, Galerie Michael Janssen, Berlin
- Together, Hunter Museum of American Art, Chattanooga
- In Situ, Galerie Michael Janssen, Cologne

2008

- Paragons, University of Toronto, Toronto
- Lever House, New York

2010

- Looking for the Face I Had Before the World Was Made, MCA Denver
