= Monique Prieto =

American artist (born 1962)

- Born: 1962 (age 63–64); Inglewood, California, United States
- Known for: Painting, Printmaking
- Spouse: Michael Webster (1993 - )

Monique Prieto (born 1962) is an American artist who lives and works in Los Angeles, California. Her work consists primarily of abstract paintings which use shape and color symbolically to represent complex ideas and narratives, though she has also worked at printmaking as well as computer-assisted painting. Prieto received her B.F.A from the University of California, Los Angeles in 1987 and California Institute of the Arts in 1992, and her M.F.A from California Institute of the Arts in 1994. During that summer she attended Skowhegan School of Painting and Sculpture. She sees Ellsworth Kelly and Andy Warhol as influences. Prieto has been exhibiting since 1987, and has had 12 solo shows in Los Angeles as of 2011, in addition to shows in Paris, London, and New York, among others.

== Personal life ==
Prieto has been married to composer Michael Webster since 1993 and they have three children. They reside in the Echo Park neighborhood of Los Angeles.
