= Laurel Nakadate =

American feminist video artist, filmmaker, and photographer (born 1975)

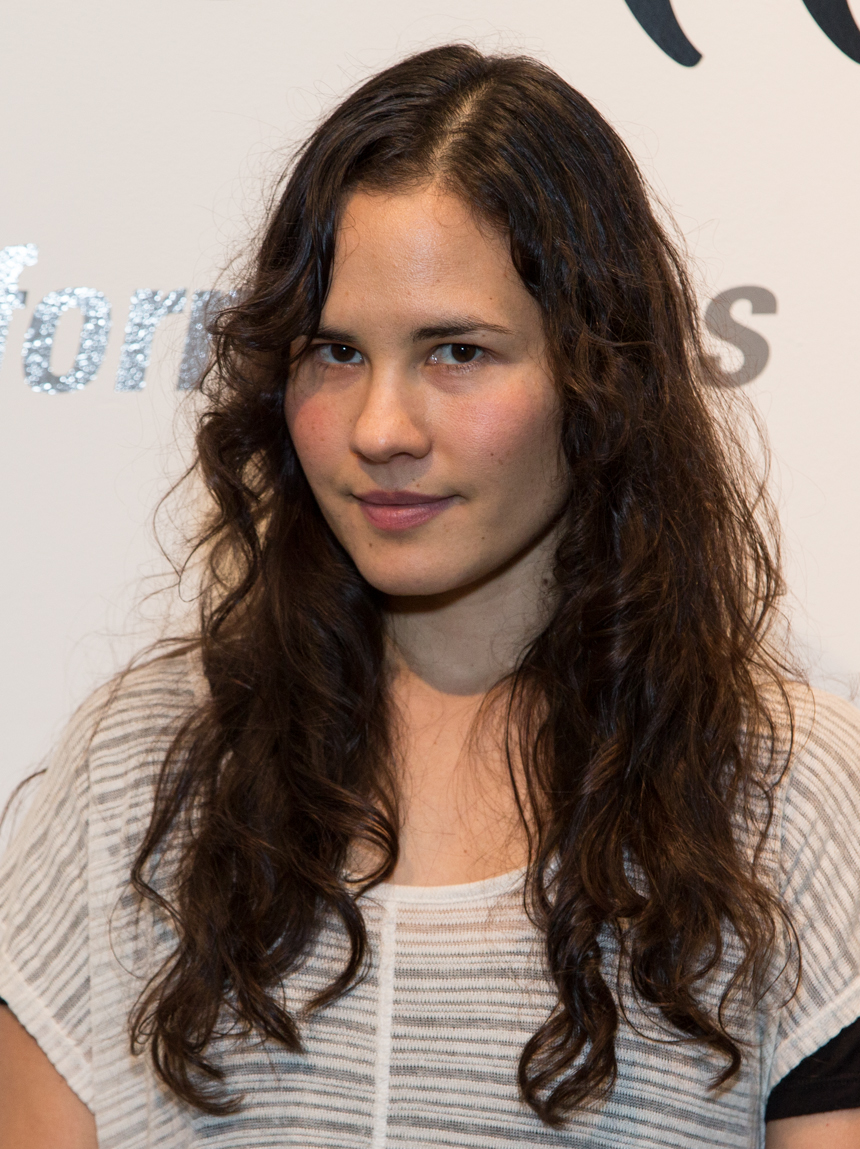
- Laurel Nakadate, 2012
- Born: 1975 (age 50–51); Austin, Texas, United States
- Education: School of the Museum of Fine Arts, Boston, Yale University
- Known for: photography, video, film

Laurel Nakadate (born 1975) is an American feminist video artist, filmmaker, and photographer. She is based in New York City.

== Biography ==
Laurel Nakadate was born 1975 in Austin, Texas and raised in Ames, Iowa.

Nakadate graduated with a Bachelor of Fine Arts (BFA) degree in 1998 from Tufts University and the School of the Museum of Fine Arts, Boston. She also earned a Master of Fine Arts (MFA) degree in 2001 for photography from Yale University.

Nakadate's work is displayed in numerous collections and museums around the United States, namely the Museum of Modern Art, the Whitney Museum of American Art, the Yale University Art Gallery, the Hessel Museum of Art, Bard College, Princeton University Art Museum, Smith College Museum of Art, LACMA, the Guggenheim Museum, and the Saatchi Collection.

Nakadate's 2005 solo show at Danziger Projects, "Love Hotel and Other Stories", was featured in The New York Times, The Village Voice, and Flash Art. Art critic Jerry Saltz named her a "standout" in the 2005 "Greater New York" show at P.S.1 Contemporary Art Center, Long Island City, New York

Since then, Nakadate's work has been exhibited at the Getty Museum, Los Angeles; the Asia Society, New York; the Reina Sofia, Madrid; the Berlin Biennial; Grand Arts, Kansas City; and at Leslie Tonkonow Artworks + Projects, New York. A ten-year retrospective of her work, called Only the Lonely, was on view at MoMA PS1 from January 23 to August 8, 2011.

A cover interview with the artist appeared in the October 2006 issue of The Believer.

Nakadate's first feature-length film, Stay The Same Never Change, premiered at the Sundance Film Festival in Park City, Utah, on January 16, 2009, and was featured in the 2009 New Directors/New Films Festival at The Museum of Modern Art and Lincoln Center. Her second feature, The Wolf Knife, premiered at the 2010 Los Angeles Film Festival, and was nominated for a 2010 Gotham Award and a 2011 Independent Spirit Award.

Nakadate currently lives and works in New York City and is the Director of Graduate Studies at the School of the Museum of Fine Arts, Boston.

== Work ==
Laurel Nakadate is known for creating video and photographic works that explore themes of sexuality, femininity and gender roles, and the knife-edge between vulnerability and power within chance encounters. Nakadate has often used herself as a subject within her work, documenting her interactions with strangers in various settings. Tonally, her work has been described as "disturbingly intimate"," as well as "creepy" art where "voyeurism, exhibitionism, and hostility merge with gullibility, cunning, and folly."

One of Nakadate’s first works was her film Happy Birthday (2000). In this film, Nakadate asked three men to celebrate her birthday with her in intimate, one-on-one encounters. Surprisingly, however, it was not her birthday and she did not know these men. Happy Birthday (2000) establishes the direction of her work to follow, in that she explores the uncertainty of relationships with strangers. Through her work, Nakadate aims to establish herself as a host and a hostage simultaneously, diving deeper into the controversial issues of being an Asian American woman in a white, male dominated society.

Two of Nakadate’s most important works, Beg For Your Life (2006) and Oops (2007), focus on themes of control and danger. Nakadate focuses on the ideas in feminism and empowers women to reverse the power in gender roles while putting herself in “dangerous situations with men." Through these stranger interactions, Nakadate works to send the message that she is the one who controls the narrative.

Her collaboration with James Franco, a live performance titled Three Performances in Search of Tennessee (2011), was commissioned for Performa 11, the fourth edition of the Performa Biennial. Her newer photographic work, Relations, explores Nakadate's own genealogy through photos of distant relatives. Her feature film The Wolf Knife continues Nakadate's common themes of voyeurism, connection, and intimacy.

== Reception ==
New York Times critic Ken Johnson called her "smart and scarily adventurous." She was also featured in the book 25 Under 25: Up-and-Coming American Photographers.

Art critic John Yau, in an article in The Brooklyn Rail on her 2011 retrospective, writes to the artist: "You explore a more unstable terrain, always intent on making 'a narrow escape,' the only option you see for yourself. Meanwhile, the middle aged, potbellied man is condemned to pirouette, again and again. It is his one true moment of beauty and tenderness recorded for posterity—you have given him his 'narrow escape' and he knows it, as he does what he is told."

Nakadate uses her artwork to further discuss her Asian American identity by using ideas of “objectification, spectacle, and alienation." As pointed out by art critic John Yau on looking deeper into the messages of Nakadate's work “it doesn’t matter if an Asian American artist disavows race; she will be grouped as such because of an inherent institutional marginalization. And even despite the well-documented continuation of institutional racism and gender.”

Nakadate portrays post–Asian American ideals and Yau’s concepts in her Strangers and Relations (2014) piece. Nakadate does not appear in any of the photos in this collection and only depicts her white relatives, which she found through DNA testing. Critics have noticed, especially through Nakadate’s work, her failure to address racial identity and believe that for “artists of color to transcend this institutional racism, they must continue making art that doesn’t reference race.”

New York Times critic Roberta Smith reviewed very favorably Nakadate's recent show, "Strangers and Relations (2013)," a show consisting of portraits of Americans distantly related to the artist (and located through DNA-testing), calling it "unusually gripping," and adding, "Ms. Nakadate’s nocturnes envelop us in darkness and tenderness and, as usual in her work, an unexpected intimacy opens up."

== Critiques ==
Nakadate's work has stirred some controversial debates concerning her work with race and gender. Critics have also been skeptical of Nakadate's work ethically, as many believe that her work with strangers is "manipulating" them. Refuting this point, The Leslie Tonkonow Artworks + Projects of New York states that Nakadate's work sidesteps the fact that "everyone is acting" and that this concept is key to understanding Nakadate's work and her artfulness.

One point Mary Ann Doane states about Nakadate’s work on the male and stranger gaze is that the "patriarchy has always already said everything (everything and nothing).”

== Personal life ==
She lives in Brooklyn and Dutchess County, and is married to novelist Rick Moody.
