= Ammar Eloueini =

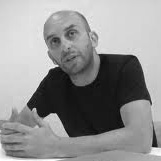
- Born: Ammar Eloueini; 16 October 1968 (age 57); Lebanon
- Education: Columbia University; Paris-Malaquais
- Occupation: Architect
- Practice: AEDS, Ammar Eloueini Digit-all Studio

Ammar Eloueini (born 1968 in Beirut, Lebanon) is an architect who established AEDS | Ammar Eloueini Digit-all Studio in Paris in 1997. Since 1999 the office has operated with locations in Europe and the United States.

AEDS has completed projects at different scales in a range of geographic locations. From object design such as urban furniture for the city of New Orleans, to six retail spaces in Europe for Japanese fashion designer Issey Miyake, the office has developed an expertise in solving a wide range of design problems, while serving a wide range of clients including the Royal Norwegian Ministry of Petroleum and Energy, the Chicago Museum of Contemporary Art and choreographer John Jasperse in New York.

AEDS's work has been recognized with a series of awards such as the New York Architectural League’s Emerging Voices (2007), eleven AIA Design Excellence awards and the French Ministry of Culture Nouveaux Albums des Jeunes Architectes (2002). The work of Ammar Eloueini is part of five permanent collections: The Museum of Modern Art (MoMA) in New York, the Centre Pompidou in Paris, the Canadian Centre for Architecture (CCA) in Montreal, Disseny Hub Barcelona (DHUB) and The Ogden Museum of Southern Art in New Orleans.

Between 1999 and 2005, Ammar Eloueini chaired the Digital Media Program, as well as taught design studio, theory and digital fabrication courses at the University of Illinois at Chicago. Currently Eloueini is a professor at Tulane University and regularly serves as thesis advisor at the ENSCI in Paris.

Ammar Eloueini received, with honors, the degree of Diplômé par le Gouvernement from Paris-Villemin in 1994, and graduated with a Master of Science in Advanced Architectural Design from Columbia University in 1996. Eloueini has participated in several symposia and exhibitions, including “Mixing It Up With Mies” at the Canadian Centre for Architecture and the Venice Biennale. In addition to several solo and group shows, the work of Ammar Eloueini has been documented by two bilingual monographs, published by Damdi in Korea and AADCU in China.

== Monographs ==
- Next AEDS, Ammar Eloueini, AADCU publisher, curated and edited by Bruce Q. Lan, hardcover, ISBN 756094860X, ISBN 978-7560948607
- DD 26 Digital Recall, AEDS Ammar Eloueini Digital Studio, hardcover, ISBN 8991111335, ISBN 978-8991111332
- CoReFab, Ammar Eloueini, paperback, ISBN 0974680079

== Permanent Collections ==
The work of Ammar Eloueini is part of five permanent collections.

- The Museum of Modern Art (MoMA), CoReFab#116_25 chair (full scale), New York, USA
- Centre Pompidou, 3 CoReFab#71 chairs (full scale), Paris, France
- Canadian Centre for Architecture (CCA), 4 CoReFab#71 chairs (scale models), Montreal, Canada
- Disseny Hub Barcelona (DHUB), 21 CoReFab#116 chairs (scale models), Barcelona, Spain
- The Ogden Museum of Southern Art, 100 prints of CoReFab#71 chairs, New Orleans, USA

== Awards and honors ==
- 2005-pres 11 AIA Design Excellence Awards
- 2012 MoMA PS1 Young Architects Program (YAP) Finalist
- 2007 Emerging Voices, Architectural League of New York
- 2006 Aides a la Creation unrestricted grant, VIA, CoReFab#71
- 2001-02 Nouveaux Albums des Jeunes Architectes (highest recognition for architects under 35), French Ministry of Culture
- 2001 Publication Grant, Graham Foundation for Advanced Studies in the Fine Arts
