= China Marks =

American artist

- Born: 1942 (age 83–84); Kansas City, Missouri
- Education: Kansas City Art Institute and Washington University
- Website: https://chinamarks.net/

China Marks (born 1942, Kansas City, Missouri) is an American artist creating process-directed sewn drawings and books.

== Education ==
Marks earned a Bachelor of Fine Arts in Sculpture from the Kansas City Art Institute and a Master of Fine Arts in Sculpture from the Sam Fox School of Design & Visual Arts at Washington University in St. Louis.

== Career ==
=== Art ===
From the 1970s through the early 1980s, Marks trained and worked primarily as a sculptor and embraced drawing, painting, and printmaking. A fellowship at the Center for Innovative Print and Paper, now the Brodsky Center for Innovative Print and Paper at Rutgers University, in 1989 resulted in a group of monotypes created over three days.

In 1991, Marks started using decorative paint rollers in conjunction with sculptural reliefs. Marks executed a series of figures drawn with a brush in acrylic paint on paper, working in black and then expanding into other colors. The figures were drawn on patterned backgrounds created by the decorative paint rollers and, later, on printed backgrounds created by Marks from her older printed or drawn work or from found imagery.

This fusion of drawing, narrative, and pattern coalesced in Marks’ aesthetic, and on December 6, 2000, Marks experienced a significant shift in her thinking: “My drawings told me they had to be sewn.” She also decided that simple hand-sewing or hand embroidery would not work to get what she was after, and that mastering the properties of a sewing machine was required. She purchased a portable sewing machine, and “began to learn to draw with it, at first simply, then with greater complexity, making contemporary drawings that were enriched and transformed by the process of their creation. From the outset, I somehow knew that this was what I was going to do for the rest of my life and that the potential was enormous. I wanted to make the sewing machine an extension of my nervous system.” Marks thus broke with her earlier processes and expressed her aesthetic through fabric and sewing. Though her work had previously explored realms of the fantastic, the colors, textures, and imagery in fabric and the tonal, tactile, and linear properties of stitching provided Marks with an expanded repertoire of elements to actualize her ideas. Marks calls these works ″sewn drawings.″

Though she had no previous knowledge of the complexities of a sewing machine, Marks’ expertise with power tools, skills she acquired as a sculptor, served as the basis for understanding the mechanics of machine sewing. Nevertheless, mastering the sewing machine and drawing with it was an intense learning process that moved from combining hand and machine embroidery to achieving the dexterity to draw on the machine.

Marks’ earliest sewn drawings began as assembling imagery (faces, heads, human figures, fabulous beasts, flora, structures, objects, etc.) cut from scraps of disparate commercially printed fabrics or creating forms from scratch with fabric scraps. After arranging, re-arranging, and exploring potential variables, a phantasmagorical world would emerge. Marks would then construct a suitable ground for the narrative, using textiles from her growing collection of fabric scraps, swatches, and yardage. The resulting panels, reminiscent of applique, tapestry, embroidery, and traditional drawing, were self-contained narratives of vibrant color, great texture, and exuberant imagination.

As the sewn drawings developed and became more extensive, layered, and complex, Marks' portable sewing machine could no longer handle the heavier load. In 2002, she purchased an industrial zigzag machine, the Consew 233R, which could handle Marks' ambition. As a result of the sewing machine's extended capabilities, Marks′ work grew to the degree that her earlier work "suddenly seemed like the work of another person." Forms became more intricate, and compositions became more variegated, with enriched layers of texture and color. Shading achieved a more comprehensive range through pure stitching.

=== Books ===
In 2007, at the prompting of book artist Esther K. Smith, who was writing “How to Make Books” for Random House, Marks created her first one-of-a-kind book, Dream Girls. Images from the first draft of Dream Girls appeared in Smith’s book. Created from fabric and using the sewn drawings technique Marks was developing, Dream Girls extended Marks′ oeuvre from the self-contained narratives of the individual sewn drawings to a longer form of storytelling. The process and result enhanced the narrative impulse that animated her drawings. Marks resolved “to make at least a book a year” for the rest of her life. She made two unique books the following year: A Book of Horses and A Book of Lives.

During this period, as Marks continued her development of sewn drawings and one-of-a-kind books, a chance walk in the Spring of 2009 resulted in Marks spotting a broken umbrella in the street. Intrigued by the black umbrella’s white-printed text, it eventually triggered her thinking about text. She silk-screened text of white ink on black fabric, creating a store of printed text which resulted in two books created in 2009: The First Black Book, consisting only of white text on black fabric, and The Second Black Book, which included additional text and a few illustrations created as sewn drawings and applied found objects. Her 2010 book, Pressing Questions, broke from pure black and added color and extensive text. The text, written in doggerel, was executed as appropriated lettering from fabric and invented letters.

These breakthroughs in the relationship of text to imagery profoundly affected Marks’ sewn drawings, and by the autumn of 2010, her drawings now included text. As with the books, the text in the sewn drawings was derived from words or cut letters from pieces of fabric, or letters Marks created from unrelated shapes.

In 2013, Marks’ process was further enhanced by the purchase of a state-of-the-art “computerized embroidery machine, specialty threads, stabilizers, and computer-aided design (CAD) software, along with a Windows-based laptop to manage the software,” all of it acquired with money awarded Marks by the Pollock-Krasner Foundation. With these new tools, Marks could embroider lines and blocks of text directly onto panels of sewn drawings instead of piecing words or letters together from fabric sources. The text and typefaces could then be specific to the narrative and immediately legible, leading Marks to become as much a writer as a visual artist. Besides the sewn drawings, Marks’ fascination with written narrative also manifested in text pieces. These smaller works contain only minimal sewn imagery or are devoid of imagery entirely. Two of her text pieces were featured in the poetry publication W.I.S.H. POETRY PRESS in January 2014.

Marks sees her place in contemporary art as an “appropriationist and a synthesizer, influenced by manga, anime, and other contemporary Asian art, as well as almost by everything else I see and hear, touch and taste.” Her work aims to entertain and surprise her audience. Marks unites tradition and experimentation through the use of appropriating images from printed fabric, techniques from the fabric arts of embroidery and tapestry, narrative storytelling, and collage. She considers her sewn drawings and fabric books “a new model for storytelling, more experiential than linear.”

=== Exhibitions, public commissions and collections ===
Marks has exhibited extensively since her first solo show of sculptures and drawings in 1984 at BACA Downtown, a nonprofit gallery and black box theater in Downtown Brooklyn. In 1986, she created a room-sized installation titled “Intimations of a Parallel World,” at New York’s 22 Wooster Gallery’s Two Two Raw Downstairs space. Using cut-out drawings of men and animals in action, recalling Ancient Greek relief friezes, “Intimations of a Parallel World” was an early expression of Marks’ interest in alternative realms, “a world parallel to our own, accessible only through my art.” Marks created additional iterations of the “Parallel World” installations with “A World Made Flesh: Part Two of The Parallel World,” exhibited at the Morris Museum, Morristown, New Jersey, in 1987; “Sacred Precinct: Part Three of The Parallel World,” exhibited at New York’s Petrosino Park in 1991; and “Who Killed the Queen: Part Four of The Parallel World,” exhibited at the Tomasulo Gallery at Union County College, Cranford, New Jersey.

Other significant exhibitions during this period included:

- Solo shows at Rutgers University’s Paul Robeson Center Gallery in Newark, New Jersey
- The Newark Museum
- The Johnson and Johnson Gallery in Johnson & Johnson
- The Trans Hudson Gallery in Jersey City
- A fifteen-year retrospective at the Rabbet Gallery in New Brunswick
- Grand Arts in Kansas City, Missouri

Marks was also represented in important group exhibitions at this time at the Art Museum of Florida State University, Tallahassee; the Ben Shahn Galleries at William Paterson University in Wayne, New Jersey; Kansas City Art Institute, Kansas City, Missouri; essential exhibitions in New York’s Marymount Manhattan College; the Luise Ross Gallery; the George Adams Gallery; and other venues across the country.

By 2003, Marks exhibited her sewn drawings and, later, her one-of-a-kind books. Solo shows of this new material were mounted at O’Kane Gallery at the University of Houston–Downtown, Houston, Texas; the Luise Ross Gallery in New York; the Marianna Kistler Beach Museum of Art, Manhattan, Kansas; Emerson Center for Arts and Culture in Bozeman, Montana; the Schoolhouse History and Art Center, Colstrip; the Paris Gibson Square Art Center, Great Falls, the Visual Arts Gallery at the University of Montana, Missoula; Art 101, Brooklyn, New York; and the Thompson Gallery at the Cambridge School of Weston, Weston, Massachusetts. Solo exhibitions are scheduled through 2016 in New York’s prestigious Center for Book Arts; the Foosaner Art Museum at Florida Institute of Technology, Melbourne; and the Hampden Gallery at the University of Massachusetts, Amherst, among others across the country.

=== Honors and awards ===
Marks won her first important award, a Fulbright-Hayes Fellowship, for a 16-month stay in Nepal, making sculptures, in 1972. Additional honors followed, including a Graduate Fellowship from the Danforth Foundation; multiple fellowships from the New Jersey State Council on the Arts; an Esseff Foundation for the Arts Purchase Award; a National Endowment for the Arts-Mid Atlantic fellowship for works on paper; two George Sugarman Foundation grants; two New York Foundation for the Arts fellowships, the second as a Gregory Millard Fellow in Printmaking/Drawing/Artist’s Books; and many others. In 1988, Marks was honored as a Distinguished Artist by the New Jersey State Council on the Arts. She served as an Artist-in-Residence at the Newark Museum in 2003 and a residency at Anchor Graphics at Columbia College, Chicago, in 2011. In 2013, Marks was awarded the prestigious Pollock-Krasner Foundation grant.
