= David Huffman (artist) =

American painter (born 1963)

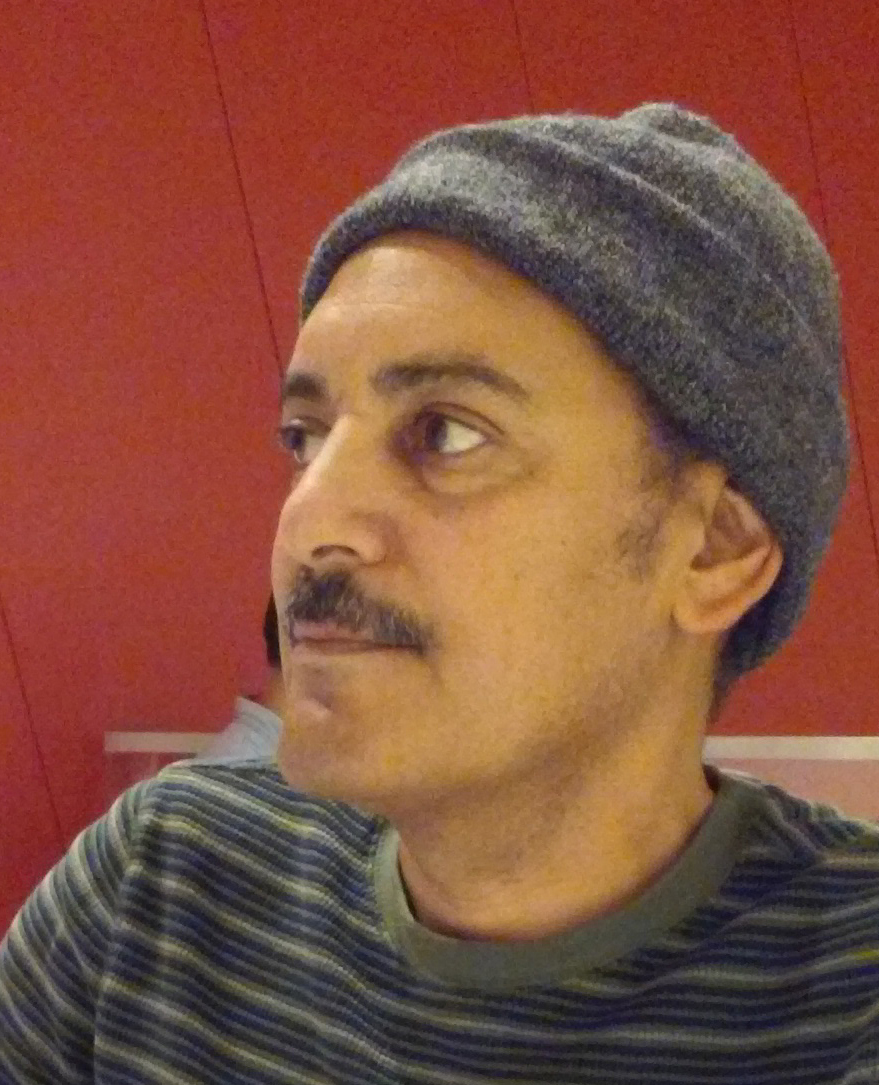
- Born: 1963 (age 62–63)
- Known for: contemporary art, painting
- Style: abstraction, figuration
- Movement: Afrofuturism
- Website: david-huffman.com

David Huffman (born 1963) is an American painter, installation artist, and educator. He is known for works that combine science fiction aesthetics with a critical focus on the political exploration of identity.

== Early life and education ==
David Huffman was born and raised in Berkeley, California. His mother Dolores Davis was an activist who supported various local causes in the 60s, including the Black Panthers for whom she designed the iconic Free Huey flag.

Huffman was exposed to science fiction early, in the form of television shows such as Star Trek, Astro Boy and Shogun Warriors.

Huffman studied in New York and San Francisco receiving his MFA from the California College of Arts and Crafts.

== Work ==
Huffman says "I mine events, whether historical or contemporary, from various sources, where my metaphoric stories of conflict, enlightenment, fear and resolution combine...each body of work is discreet in materiality, but continues the dialog." Works combine and recombine: pop culture iconography across eras, formal explorations in the medium of paint, science fiction aesthetics and identity politics in an evolving lexicon that interrogates "the politics of race, activism, and painting itself".

Huffman's early work includes African-American space travelers he calls "traumanauts". These figures enter futuristic landscapes where paint combines with images of cosmic debris and ecological decay to create surreal tableaux.

Later works continue to explore the politics of race in works that limit his iconography to the image of the basketball in combination with an abstracted deep space created of layered tones of browns and blacks.

The basketball is also central to Huffman's installation work. His Basketball Pyramid works feature sculptures created of hundreds of basketballs built into life sized pyramids.

== Awards and fellowships ==
Among the honors which Huffman has earned are:

- Eureka Fellowship, Fleishhacker Foundation (2008)
- Artadia Award (2006)
- Palo Alto Public Arts Commission Award (2005)

== Selected exhibitions ==
Huffman's solo exhibitions include Worlds in Collision at Roberts & Tilton Gallery in 2016, Everything Went Dark Until I Saw Angels, in 2014, and Floating World, in 2012, both at Patricia Sweetow Gallery, Out of Bounds at the San Francisco Arts Commission Gallery in 2011, Dig it! at Patricia Sweetow Gallery in 2008, and Land of the New Rising Sun at Lizabeth Oliveria Gallery in 2005 His first solo was Broadsides in 1995 at the Los Angeles' Jan Baum Gallery.

== Collections ==
Huffman's work is held in many permanent collections including:

- San Francisco Museum of Modern Art, San Francisco, California
- Studio Museum in Harlem, New York, New York
- Minneapolis Institute of Art, Minneapolis, Minn.
- Crocker Art Museum, Sacramento, California
- Arkansas Art Center
- Lodeveans Collection London, England
- Arizona State University Art Museum
- Wellington Management, Boston, Massachusetts
- JPMorgan Chase Collection, New York, New York
- Eileen Norton Collection Los Angeles, California
- Palo Alto Art Center, Palo Alto, California
- de Saisset Museum Santa Clara, California

== Teaching ==
Huffman has taught at Santa Clara University and is currently a professor at California College of the Arts. He is faculty in the Graduate Fine Arts Program at California College of the Arts.
