= Ratcatcher (attire) =

Ratcatcher is informal attire worn when fox-hunting; it consists primarily of a tweed jacket with tan breeches. Other specific items of clothing, forming part of the "uniform", might be prescribed by individual hunting clubs.

It is possible that the term derives from the attire which the "ratcatcher" or "terrier man" wore. He was probably a crofter and followed the hunt across his land. When a fox went to ground, the terrier man would send his terrier into the covert to kill the fox.

In Victorian England the rat-catcher, whose occupation was catching rats as a form of pest control, could use terrier dogs as one way of catching the rats, and this is probably the reason that the "terrier man" on the hunt was often referred to as a "ratcatcher". The Tate holds a painting, The Rat-Catcher and his Dogs exhibited in 1824, which illustrates the form of dress worn by the village ratcatcher in the first half of the 19th century and demonstrates the similarity between that attire and ratcatcher attire worn in fox-hunting.

The usage of the word "ratcatcher" is demonstrated in a short story, The Man in Ratcatcher in which one of the characters asks "Who was the fellah in ratcatcher I passed ridin' that awful old quod of yours?"

Again it can be seen in Evelyn Waugh's novel A Handful of Dust:

She (Nanny) deplored it all, hounds, Master, field, huntsman and whippers-in, Mr Tendril's niece in her mackintosh, Jock in a rat-catcher, Mrs Rattery in tall hat and cutaway coat, oblivious of the suspicious glances of the subscribers ... it was all a lot of nonsense of Ben Hacket's.

He uses the word again in Brideshead Revisited when Cordelia answers Charles' question about where Sebastian is,

"He's in disgrace." The words in that clear, child's voice, had the ring of a bell tolling, but she went on: "Coming out in that beastly rat-catcher coat and mean little tie like something from Captain Morvin's Riding Academy."
