= Martin Fischer-Dieskau =

German conductor

- Born: Berlin, West Germany
- Occupation: Classical music conductor

Martin Fischer-Dieskau is a German conductor.

== Early life ==
Fischer-Dieskau was born in Berlin to a musical family; his father was the singer Dietrich Fischer-Dieskau, his mother was the cellist Irmgard Poppen. Fischer-Dieskau's older brother, Mathias, is a highly regarded stage designer, and his younger brother Manuel Fischer-Dieskau is a cellist. Fischer-Dieskau claims that his desire to be a conductor dates from 1961, when he and his older brother visited a rehearsal of Don Giovanni at the Deutsche Oper Berlin, in which his father was starring.

== Education ==
Fischer-Dieskau studied conducting, violin and piano at the Hochschule für Musik in Vienna, the Hochschule der Künste in Berlin and the Accademia Chigiana di Siena. He participated in masterclasses with Franco Ferrara, Charles Mackerras, Seiji Ozawa and Leonard Bernstein. From 1976 to 1977 he was a laureate in the German Music League's National Selection of Young Artists, and in 1978, 1988 and 1997 was awarded scholarships by the Leonard Bernstein Fellowship Program at Tanglewood.

Martin Fischer-Dieskau's education was not exclusively focused on practical music-making. He also received a Magister degree in Italian Literature and Musicology from the Freie Universität Berlin. Publications: Wagner&Verdi, Kulturen der Oper Böhlau Verlag, Köln 2014. In 2015 ensued the PhD graduation with a dissertation about "Conducting in the Nineteenth Century - Italy's special path", which achieved international scientific recognition.

== Musical career ==
His first success was a production of Haydn's IL MONDO DELLA LUNA at Charlottenburg Palace in his hometown of Berlin in 1974. Shortly thereafter, he won several first prizes in the concert selection of the German Music Council as well as at competitions in Siena and Vienna and was invited to Tanglewood, USA, (1978, 1988, 1997) by Seiji Ozawa as a Leonard Bernstein Fellow. As a result, Antal Doráti also became aware of him and appointed Martin Fischer-Dieskau as his assistant conductor of the Detroit Symphony Orchestra in the 1978/79 season. After positions in Augsburg, Aachen and Hagen, Fischer-Dieskau became principal conductor at Theater Bern in 1991 with responsibilities for the contemporary, Italian and Russian repertory. He was a frequent guest conductor at festivals in Berlin, Helsinki, Drottningholm, Oviedo and Granada, where he performed in collaboration with celebrity singers such as Ricciarelli, Obraztsova, Aliberti, Seiffert. In 1993 he served as the artistic leader of the Youth Festival at Bayreuth. He has held a professorship in conducting at the University of the Arts Bremen since 1994 and produced and hosted his own television series of eleven musical "tours" that were telecast for ARD throughout Germany. In 2001 he was the initiator of an Israeli-Palestinian-German orchestral summit in Tel Aviv, Israel.

He was chief conductor of the Canadian KW Symphony Orchestra from 2000 to 2004. He expanded the standard repertoire and opened the concert hall to new audiences with this orchestra, whose sphere of influence covers the entire region around Toronto. The orchestra's first German-Canadian festival was one of the orchestra's most significant achievements in 2002 under his direction.

From 2009 to 2011 he held the position of Music Director at the Taipei Symphony Orchestra, where he presented the full breadth of the symphonic repertoire – always mirroring contemporary Taiwanese composers. In addition, he staged complete opera productions and helped organize a Puccini symposium with international music theater experts.

In the light of an increasingly unmanageable international conducting scene with candidates of both sexes without verifiable qualifications – the usual list of occupied positions usually helps little – Fischer-Dieskau turns more and more to the great conducting tradition of the last and the previous century in his concert programmes.

For example, the first recording of Antal Doráti's only opera THE CHOSEN/DER KÜNDER with an international star cast on the NAXOS label was his initiative. Doráti's librettist was none other than the philosopher Martin Buber, on whose likewise only stage work ELIA Doráti's opera is based. This double premiere has caused and continues to generate great international interest among theatres and academia under Fischer-Dieskau's direction.

2024 marked the beginning of a fruitful collaboration with the Wilhelm Furtwängler Society of China. On November 29^{th}, the eve of Furtwängler's 70^{th} anniversary of death, Martin Fischer-Dieskau drew attention to Furtwängler's extraordinary art through special interpretations, exhibitions and lectures. This met with sustained public interest, so that an expansion of this programme idea was immediately put into practice the following year. 30 years earlier, Fischer-Dieskau had already performed and recorded the composer-conductor's Te Deum with the Berlin Radio Symphony Orchestra on the occasion of a similar Furtwängler anniversary with international acclaim.

Meanwhile the conductor Martin Fischer-Dieskau has led many important orchestras in Europe, North America and Asia as a guest conductor and has held chief positions four times – on three continents. Important engagements have included the Berlin Philharmonic, the London and Royal Philharmonic Orchestras, the Orchestre National de France, the NHK Tokyo, the Tokyo Philharmonic, the New Japan Philharmonic Orchestra and the State Orchestra in Moscow. He continues to receive invitations as a guest conductor from Spain, Italy, Scandinavia, Israel, France and England.

Fischer-Dieskau's opera repertoire comprises about 50 titles. After his permanent engagements at the theatres in Augsburg, Aachen, Hagen and Stuttgart, he became principal conductor in Bern in 1990 and subsequently conducted productions of the Hawaii Opera, the Minnesota Opera, the San Carlo in Naples, the Regio Turin, the Liceu Barcelona and other Spanish houses.

== Recordings ==
- Concert for Lidice (BIS-CD-578), Czech Philharmonic Orchestra, New Berlin Chamber Orchestra
- Humperdinck: Moorish Rhapsody/Sleeping Beauty (Naxos 8.223369), Slovak Radio Symphony Orchestra
- Furtwängler: Te Deum, Hindemith: Mathis der Maler Symphony, Berlin Rundfunk-Symphonieorchester, IPPNW concerts.
- Antal Doráti: DER KÜNDER world premiere recording, Konieczny, Schade, Frenkel, Beethoven Academy Orchestra Cracow, ORFEO/NAXOS
