= Merritt Johnson =

American artist

Merritt Johnson (born 1977) is an American contemporary artist, often centering her work on Native American themes.

== Early life and education ==
Johnson was born in Baltimore, Maryland, in 1977.

Her love for art began when she was very young when she discovered a book with Picasso's paintings.

She received a Bachelor's in Fine Arts from Carnegie Mellon University and a Master's in Fine Arts from the Massachusetts College of Art and Design.

== Career ==
Johnson said that her art is viewed differently by Indigenous and non-Indigenous viewers because of their lack of knowledge and understanding of Indigenous terms, culture, and land. She wrote that when people hear about Native American Art, most of them think of "beads and feathers". She uses traditional materials to create emphasis on problems that have had a long history.

== Claim of Native American ancestry ==
She described herself and was described by others in 2014–2018 as being of Mohawk and Blackfoot descent or "mixed Kanienkehaka (Mohawk), Blackfoot, and non-Indigenous descent". However, in May 2021 after her claims of Indigenous ancestry were challenged, Johnson withdrew her work from a Fruitlands Museum exhibition of works by Native American artists.

Johnson's personal website has varied over time in her description of herself including "the daughter of Kanienkehaka (Mohawk), Blackfoot, and North American settlers" in 2014, as "a woman of mixed Onkwehonwe* and settler descent" in 2016, as "not claimed by, nor a citizen of any nation from which she descends (Irish, Kanien’keha:ká/Mohawk, Blackfoot, Jamaican, Swedish) in 2021 and as "not claimed by, nor a citizen of any nation from which she descends" (without names).

== Collections ==
Johnson's work has been held in the following permanent collections:

- Birmingham Museum of Art, Birmingham, Alabama
- Museum of Contemporary Native Arts, Santa Fe, New Mexico

== Exhibitions ==
=== Solo ===
- Merritt Johnson: Exorcising America – 2018 (Salt Lake City, Utah) – Johnson uses a model to illustrate the struggles Indigenous people have faced and the love and devotion to their land.

=== Group ===
- Monarchs: Brown and Native Contemporary Artists in the Path of the Butterfly – 2019 (Overland Park, Kansas) – Represents the challenges Natives have faced regarding forced assimilation, oppression, and outright unfairness. Butterfly represents the generations that have endured everything while living on their native land.
- New Acquisitions: 2011–2017 – 2018 (Santa Fe, New Mexico) – Accentuates the newly acquired work over the past six years from IAIA Museum of Contemporary Native Arts (MoCNA).
- Connective Tissue: New Approaches to Fiber in Contemporary Native Art – 2017 (Santa Fe, New Mexico) – Native American artists who use various forms of fiber art media or methods to attain the vision they had in their head. The artists had similar styles but different core beliefs or themes. Fiber art is engaging because of its connection to gender stereotypes, cultural heritage, domesticity, homeliness, and its innovation of traditions.
- Opening Exhibition (Oakland, California) – A collection of different artists that speak upon themes like environment, class, and race in the United States.
- On Being Illiberal – 2018 (Toronto, Ontario, Canada) – Brought together three different artists that proposed the idea for an Indigenous-led future.

== Personal life ==
Johnson is married and is the mother and stepmother of six children. She lives with her family in Sitka, Alaska.
