= Aidas Bareikis =

Lithuanian artist

Aidas Bareikis (born October 4, 1967) is a Lithuanian artist, currently working in the United States.

Bareikis studied at the Vilnius Academy of Fine Arts between 1987 and 1992. His previous attempt at finishing art school in Vilnius was interrupted when he was drafted by the Soviet Army and sent to Afghanistan, where he saw gunfighting, injured soldiers of war, and caskets, before inflicting delirium on himself through sleep deprivation and the inhalation of graphite powder.

In 1993 he received a scholarship and moved to America. Between 1993 and 1997 he studied at Hunter College in New York, graduating with an MFA.

In 2000 he exhibited at the Berlin Contemporary Art Center and at the Eleni Koroneou Gallery in Athens. In 2004 he showcased his artwork at the Miller Durazo Gallery in Los Angeles. He showed at Leo Koenig Gallery, and Happy Lion Gallery.

The New York Times describes his work as "sprawling, grotesque yet artfully color-coordinated messes of found objects, paint, wax, foam, plastic, scrap wood and many other materials. His installations have an impressive physical impact; but, with one exception, there is a formless one-note monotony about them."

== See also ==
- List of Lithuanian painters
