= List of LGBTQ artists =

This is a list of notable visual artists who are lesbian, gay, bisexual, transgender, queer or otherwise non-heterosexual. This list covers artists known for the creation of visual art such as drawings, paintings, sculptures, photographs, installations, performance works and video works. The entries are in alphabetical order by surname. Birth and death dates are included. All new additions to this list should include a reference.

== A ==
- Berenice Abbott (1898–1991), USA
- Nancy Andrews (born 1963), USA
- Jazmin Bean Adams (born 2003), UK
- Pol Anglada (born 1991), Spain

== B ==
- Francis Bacon (1909–1992), Ireland/UK
- Hannah Baer, USA
- Djuna Barnes (1892–1982), USA
- Tosh Basco, USA
- Jean-Michel Basquiat (1960–1988), USA
- Martin Battersby (1914–1980), UK
- Cecil Beaton (1904–1980), UK
- Alison Bechdel (born 1960), USA
- Joan E. Biren (born 1944), USA
- Gilles Blanchard of Pierre et Gilles (born 1953), France
- Rora Blue (born c. 1996), USA
- Seth Bogart (born 1980), USA
- Rosa Bonheur (1822–1899), France
- David Bowie (1947–2016), UK
- Joe Brainard (1942–1994), USA
- Louie Bretaña (born 1967), Philippines/New Zealand
- Romaine Brooks (1874–1970), USA
- Farrokh Bulsara, known as Freddie Mercury (1946–1991), Zanzibar
- Scott Burton (1938–1989), USA

== C ==
- Cathy Cade (born 1942), USA
- Paul Cadmus (1904–1999), USA
- Casey Cadwallader (born 1979), USA
- Claude Cahun (1894–1954), France
- Caravaggio (1571–1610), Italy
- Tammy Rae Carland (born 1965), USA
- Drake Carr (born 1993), USA
- Jonathan Lyndon Chase (born 1989), USA
- Jean Cocteau (1889–1963), France
- Liz Collins (born 1968), USA
- Pierre Commoy of Pierre et Gilles (born 1950), France
- Frank Coombs (1906–1941), UK
- Enrico Corte (born 1963), Italy
- Anthony Cudahy (born 1989), USA

== D ==
- Salvador Dalí (1904–1989), Spain
- TM Davy (born 1980), USA
- Sean DeLear (1964–2017), USA
- Jimmy De Sana (1949–1990), USA
- Raúl de Nieves (born 1983), Mexico
- Beauford Delaney (1901–1979), USA
- Charles Demuth (1883–1935), USA
- Jaiden Dittfach (born 1997), USA
- Donatello (c. 1386–1466), Italy
- Angela Dufresne (born 1969), USA
- Jacqueline Charlotte Dufresnoy (1931–2006), France
- Chloe Dzubilo (1960–2011), USA

== E ==
- Thomas Eakins (1844–1916), USA
- James Emmerman (born 1993), USA
- Rafa Esparza (born 1981), USA

== F ==
- Martin Firrell (born 1963), France
- Lola Flash (born 1959), USA
- Eve Fowler (born 1964), USA
- Louis Fratino (born 1993), USA
- Jared French (1905–1988), USA
- Richard Fung (born 1954), Trinidad and Tobago/Canada

== G ==
- Yishay Garbasz (born 1970), Israel/Germany
- Malik Gaines (born 1973), USA
- Chitra Ganesh (born 1975), USA
- Jeffrey Gibson (born 1972), USA
- Joseph Glasco (1925–1996), USA
- Gluck (1895–1978), UK
- Nash Glynn (born 1992), USA
- Robert Gober (born 1954), USA
- Nan Goldin (born 1953), USA
- Krzysztof Gonciarz (born 1985), Poland
- Félix González-Torres (1957–1996), Cuba/USA
- Edward Gorey (1925–2000), USA
- Duncan Grant (1885–1978), UK
- Ethan James Green (born 1990), USA
- Jimmy Groen (born 1962), Netherlands
- Lucas Grogan (born 1984), Australia
- Nancy Grossman (born 1940), USA
- Sonali Gulati (born 1972), India/USA

== H ==
- Edith Hammar (born 1992), Finland
- Barbara Hammer (1939–2019), USA
- Harmony Hammond (born 1944), USA
- Michelle Handelman (born 1960), USA
- Keith Haring (1958–1990), USA
- Mickey Harmon (1984–2025), USA
- Marsden Hartley (1877–1943), USA
- Sadao Hasegawa (1945–1999), Japan
- Johanna Hedva (born 1984), USA
- Geoffrey Hendricks (1931–2018), USA
- Hannah Höch (1889–1978), Germany
- David Hockney (born 1937), UK
- Marie Høeg (1866–1949), Norway
- Boscoe Holder (1921–2007), Trinidad and Tobago
- Oscar yi Hou (born 1998), UK/USA
- Every Ocean Hughes (born 1977), USA
- Peter Hujar (1934–1987), USA

== J ==
- Jess (1923–2004), USA
- Elton John (born 1947), UK
- Gwen John (1876–1939), Wales/France
- Jasper Johns (born 1930), USA
- Alex Jovanovich (born 1975), USA

== K ==
- Frida Kahlo (1907–1954), Mexico
- Katlego Kai Kolanyane-Kesupile (born 1988), Botswana
- Ben Kimura (1947–2003), Japan
- Kiss and Tell collective, Canada
- Brian Kenny, Germany
- Anna Elizabeth Klumpke (1856–1942), USA/France
- Eardley Knollys (1902–1991), UK

== L ==
- Scooter LaForge (born 1971), USA
- Doron Langberg (born 1985), Israel
- Thomas Lanigan-Schmidt (born 1948), USA
- Greer Lankton (1958–1996), USA
- Marie Laurencin (born 1883), France
- Tamara de Lempicka (1894–1980), Poland
- Glenn Ligon (born 1960), USA
- Alma López (born 1966), Mexico/USA
- Federico García Lorca (1898–1936), Spain
- Joe Lycett (born 1988), UK
- George Platt Lynes (1907–1955), USA

== M ==
- Robert Mapplethorpe (1946–1989), USA
- Agnes Martin (1912–2004), Canada/USA
- Ryan McNamara (born 1979), USA
- Julie Mehretu (born 1970), Ethiopia
- Michelangelo (1475–1564), Italy
- Kate Millett (1934–2017), USA
- Allyson Mitchell (born 1967), Canada
- Slava Mogutin (born 1974), Russia
- Kent Monkman (born 1965), Canada
- Sione Monū (born 1993), New Zealand/Australia
- Clifton Mooney (born 1986), USA
- Lilith Salvia Morris (born 2000), UK
- Carlos Motta (born 1978), Colombia/USA
- Andrew Mroczek (born 1977), USA
- Zanele Muholi (born 1972), South Africa

== N ==
- Shannon Novak (born 1979), New Zealand

== O ==
- Toyin Ojih Odutola (born 1985), Nigeria/USA
- Catherine Opie (born 1961), USA

== P ==
- Reuben Paterson (born 1973), New Zealand/USA
- Sam Penn (born 1998), USA
- Oren Pinhassi (born 1985), Israel
- Maria E. Piñeres (born 1966), Colombia
- Jody Pinto (born 1942), USA
- Poliziano (1454–1494), Italy
- Jill Posener (born 1953), UK

== Q ==
- Wayne Douglas Quinn (1941–1987), USA
- George Quaintance (1902–1957), USA

== R ==
- Jan Rattia (born 1974), Venezuela/USA
- Robert Rauschenberg (1925–2008), USA
- Marie Ulven Ringheim (born 1999), Norway
- Tom Rubnitz (1956–1992), USA

== S ==
- Sal Salandra (born 1946), USA
- Alma Selimović (born 1981), Bosnia
- Aviva Silverman (born 1986), USA
- Buzz Slutzky (born 1988), USA
- Simeon Solomon (1840–1905), UK
- Annie Sprinkle (born 1954), USA
- Troye Sivan (born 1995) Australia

== T ==
- Gengoroh Tagame (born 1964), Japan
- Stephen Tashjian a.k.a. Tabboo! (born 1959), USA
- Tim Tate (born 1960), USA
- Mickalene Thomas (born 1971), USA
- Luke Thurgate (born 1978), Australia
- Wolfgang Tillmans (born 1968), Germany
- Ken Tisa (born 1945), USA
- Tom of Finland (1920–1991), Finland
- George Tooker (1920–2011), USA
- Salman Toor (born 1983), Pakistan/USA
- Yannis Tsarouchis (1910–1989), Greece
- Telly Tuita (born 1980), Tonga/Australia/New Zealand
- Cy Twombly (1928–2011), USA

== U ==
- Stewart Uoo (born 1985), USA

== V ==
- Stephen Varble (1946–1984), USA
- Leonardo da Vinci (1452–1519), Italy
- Del LaGrace Volcano (born 1957), USA

== W ==
- WangShui (born 1986), USA
- Andy Warhol (1928–1987), USA
- Ambera Wellmann (born 1982), Canada
- Gray Wielebinski (born 1991), USA
- Kehinde Wiley (born 1977), USA
- Lucian Wintrich, (born 1988), USA
- David Wojnarowicz (1954–1992), USA
- Jimmy Wright (born 1944), USA
