= Gayletter =

LGBT magazine and newsletter

- Founder: Tom Jackson and Abi Benitez
- Founded: 2008
- Country: United States
- Language: English
- Website: https://gayletter.com/

Gayletter, often stylized as GAYLETTER, is a semi-annual print magazine and weekly email newsletter chronicling queer art, culture and nightlife in New York City. Founded in 2008 by Tom Jackson and Abi Benitez, Gayletter began as a weekly guide to alternative gay and queer events in New York. In 2014, Gayletter launched a printed magazine and website covering a range of expanded topics such as fashion, music, art, and literature.

== Associated figures ==
The magazine has published original artwork, photography, interviews, and stories from a panoply of queer artists, designers, and nightlife personalities such Tyler Akers, Pol Anglada, Kevin Aranibar, James Bidgood, Justin V. Bond, Jay Boogie, Elliott Jerome Brown Jr., Renée Cox, Anthony Cudahy, Austin Dale, Jimmy De Sanna, Andrej Dúbravský, Ian Faden, Alex Fiahlo, Jameson Fitzpatrick, Jim French, Nash Glynn, Jenna Gribbon, Edgar Mosa, Joe McShea, Lyle Ashton Harris, Ren Hang, House of Ladosha, Brian Kenny, Cakes da Killa, Naruki Kukita, Bruce LaBruce, Doron Langberg, Amanda Lepore, Eric Lotzer, McDermott & McGough, Bob Mizer, Slava Mogutin, Zanele Muholi, Tracey Norman, Frank Ocean, Jack Pierson, Gio Black Peter, Debarati Sanyal, Paul Mpagi Sepuya, Laurie Simmons, Manuel Solano, Casey Spooner, Chris Stewart, Mickalene Thomas, Salman Toor, Luis Venegas, Brian Vu, David Wojnarowicz, and Zena Zipora.

In April 2019, singer and producer Frank Ocean did a rare interview with Gayletter.

In 2021, Gayletter and Loewe organized an event at Twist, a gay club in Miami, for the release of a book of paintings by the painter Florian Krewer.
