= Lily Wong =

Lily Wong may refer to:

- Lily Wong (artist) (born 1989)
- Lily Wong Fillmore (born 1934), American linguist
- Lily Ah Toy (1917–2001), born Wong Wu Len, Australian pioneer and businesswoman

== See also ==
- The World of Lily Wong, a comic strip by Larry Feign
