= Ann Toebbe =

American contemporary artist (born 1974)

Ann Toebbe (born 1974) is an American contemporary artist who has had solo exhibitions at the Museum of Contemporary Art, Chicago, The Saatchi Gallery (London, UK), Steven Zevitas Gallery (Boston, MA, represented), Monya Rowe Gallery (New York City), and Tibor de Nagy Gallery (New York City, represented). Based in Chicago, she is best known for creating meticulously designed paintings and collages that depict the interiors of domestic life. In 2015, Vulture magazine art critic Jerry Saltz named one of Toebbe's exhibitions one of the year's 10 best. Toebbe has been featured in articles in Artforum, The New York Times, NY Magazine, The Boston Globe, The Chicago Tribune, Art in America, and Hyperallergic, among others.

== Early life and education ==
Toebbe grew up in Cincinnati and attended Seton High School, an all girls Catholic school. She earned a BFA in sculpture from the Cleveland Institute of Art in 1997. In 1994 and 1995 she attended the Chautauqua School of Art summer residency and in 1995 participated in Parsons School of Design's NY Studio program. After graduation she worked for five years as an art handler in galleries and museums, living in Brooklyn, New York. In 2000 Toebbe attended the Skowhegan School of Painting and Sculpture. Toebbe earned an MFA in painting from Yale University in 2004.

Toebbe was the recipient of a Jacob K. Javits Fellowship in 2003. She was awarded a DAAD (German Academic Exchange Service) scholarship for study in Berlin in 2004–05. Living in Neukölln she attended the Universität der Kunste and studied German at the Tandem Language School in Prenzlauer Berg.

== Career ==
Toebbe had her first solo exhibition in 2007 at ThreeWalls Gallery in Chicago. In 2010 she met Steven Zevitas through artist Kanishka Raja (1970–2018) and was offered a solo exhibition at Steven Zevitas Gallery in May 2010. Because of her multi-perspective compositions, Toebbe was aligned with the Faux Naïve movement in contemporary art. Toebbe became interested in collage while working for visual artist Arturo Herrera. Toebbe started introducing collage elements into her paintings in 2011 which she calls collage paintings. Hand painting all of her collage paper, she employs a meticulous system of drawing, measuring, tracing, and cutting to construct a painting.

=== Select exhibitions ===
In 2007, Toebbe had her first solo exhibition at ThreeWalls, Chicago titled Stained Glass. Toebbe painted stylized depictions from memory of the Catholic churches she attended in her formative years in Cincinnati.

In 2010, Toebbe presented a solo exhibition, Housekeeping, at Steven Zevitas Gallery in Boston. The exhibition was reviewed in Artforum and The Boston Globe.

In 2011, Toebbe exhibited her work in the 12 x 12 program at the Museum of Contemporary Art (Chicago), in which, for one month, an artist is granted free rein of a 576-square-foot white cube on the main floor of the museum. Toebbe presented three large-scale (100" x 75") collages. All three collages from the exhibition were acquired by the Saatchi Collection in London.

In 2013, Toebbe had a solo exhibition, The Inheritance, at Ebersmoore Gallery in Chicago. Simultaneously, Toebbe's cut-paper collages of kitchens and dining rooms were displayed as part of the exhibition, “Open House: Art About Home,” at the Elmhurst Art Museum in Elmhurst, Illinois.

In 2014, Toebbe produced recollections of the childhood bedroom and Veracruz home of her children's babysitter for a solo exhibition titled Shared at Steven Zevitas Gallery in Boston. The title Shared played on the theme of working-class families, like Toebbe's, who lived in small homes where children shared bedrooms.

In 2015, Toebbe's work was displayed at the Monya Rowe Gallery in New York City. The exhibition title Remarried included gouache and cut paper paintings titled, “Second Wife” and “First Wife”, “Second Marriage Madison Park” and Second Marriage East View Park”.

In 2017, Toebbe had a third solo exhibition, Room Air Conditioner, at Monya Rowe Gallery. The gallery had relocated to St. Augustine, FL. In November Toebbe participated in a two-person exhibition with the painter Sarah McEneaney at Zevitas Marcus Gallery in Los Angeles.

In 2018 Toebbe's work was included in “In My Room: Artists Paint the Interior: 1950 – Now” at The Fralin Museum of Art at The University of Virginia, Charlottesville, VA.

In 2019, Toebbe had a solo exhibition, Friends and Rentals, at Tibor de Nagy Gallery in New York City. Toebbe worked from photos she saved from Facebook posts to construct interiors she had never visited. Included were two paintings about properties she had rented with her family on vacation. Toebbe also mounted a solo exhibition, Swing State, at Sarah Lawrence College in Bronxville, NY. The work in the exhibition acted as a portrait of the artist as a middle aged woman and a Midwesterner.

== Description of work ==
Toebbe's collages consist of pieces of colored paper that are cut up and recreate the interiors of homes that she and others around her have inhabited.

In January 2015, New York Times art critic Roberta Smith situated Toebbe's work as part of what she called “the stay-at-home intimist tradition that begins with Édouard Vuillard’s Parisian interiors.” Toebbe's later work has revolved around adulthood and the changing domestic landscapes created by marriages, divorces and remarriages. As a result, Toebbe's work, Smith wrote, displayed a “weird architectural family tree” and that "both craft and details boggle the mind." Smith likened Toebbe's work to that of a "pop-up dollhouse" in which "spatial tensions become entwined with emotional histories that we can only imagine but that are invariably told from conflicting perspectives." Smith noted that Toebbe's interest in modern-day homes as a source for art is shared with contemporary painters like Sarah McEneaney and Jonas Wood, as well as the outsider artist James Charles Castle. Smith called the topic “a subject that never stops giving.”

In late 2015, art critic Jerry Saltz called Toebbe's exhibition at the Monya Rowe gallery one of the 10 best art shows of 2015. Saltz described Toebbe's work as containing “spatially layered, fine-toothed realism,” and added that “her inner Vuillard mingles with cryptic color and Escher-like space.”

== Other work ==
From 2006 until 2008 Toebbe wrote reviews for the art magazine Beautiful/Decay. She has taught drawing classes at Northwestern University, the School of the Art Institute of Chicago, and Columbia College Chicago. She has been a visiting artist at Indiana University, The Peninsula School of Art, and Sarah Lawrence College. In 2013, at the invitation of Annie Morris, Toebbe gave an Artist Connect talk at the Art Institute of Chicago, connecting her work to the American artist Florine Stettheimer (1871–1944). Toebbe has done audio interviews for the podcasts Bad at Sports (2018) and I Like Your Work (2019). In 2016 she traveled to Northern India on a Sustainable Arts Grant to research Indian miniature painting.

== Personal life ==
Toebbe is married with two daughters and lives in Chicago's Hyde Park neighborhood.
