= Sarah Faux =

American visual artist

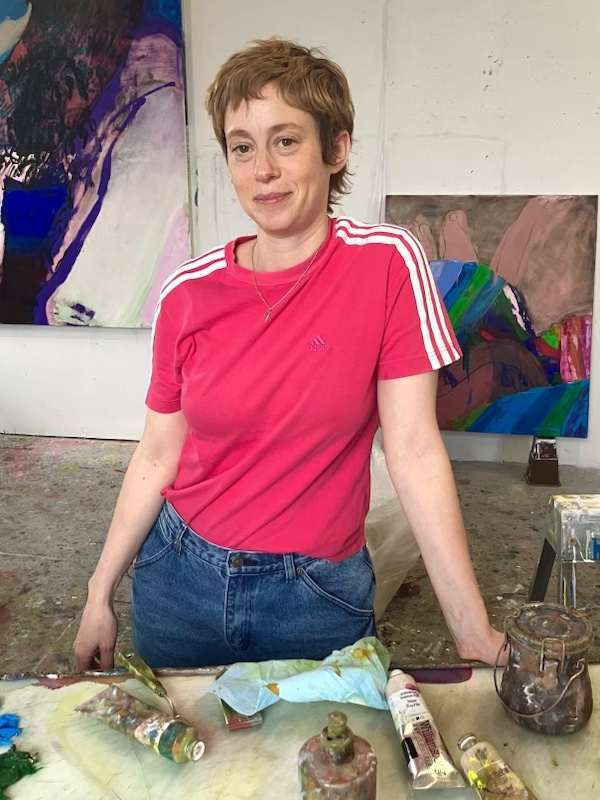
- Born: 1986 (age 39–40); Boston, MA
- Education: Brown University, Rhode Island School of Design, Yale University
- Known for: Visual Art
- Awards: Pollock-Krasner Foundation, Clyfford Still Institute Residential Fellowship Program
- Website: sarahfaux.net

Sarah Faux (b. 1986) is an American painter. Her works combine abstract and figurative elements, and deal with desire, the self, and the body. She is the winner of a Pollock-Krasner Foundation Grant and received an Institute Residential Fellowship from the Clyfford Still Museum.

== Early life and education ==
Faux grew up in Somerville, MA. She received a BA from Brown University, a BFA from Rhode Island School of Design, and an MFA from Yale University.

== Career ==
Faux is represented by Hales Gallery and Capsule Shanghai.

== Artistic practice ==
Faux’s work is both representational and abstract, and has been compared to Amy Sillman and Charline von Heyl. Her paintings feature motifs of mirrored bodies and hardware, which she uses to explore intimacy, illness, and fragmented or ambiguous identities. Faux also makes cut-out canvas collages, which she sometimes pairs directly with her paintings.

Faux frequently produces zines to accompany her exhibitions, which have included contributions from authors and artists including Ling Ma, Chitra Ganesh, and Doron Langberg.

== Awards and residencies ==
Faux has been awarded a Clyfford Still Institute Residential Fellowship (2024) and a Pollock-Krasner Foundation Grant (2023-2024). She has been awarded artist residencies at Yaddo, The Edward F. Albee Foundation and The Lower East Side Printshop.

== Selected exhibitions ==
=== Solo exhibitions ===
- Autofriction, 2025, Hales Gallery, New York, NY
- Sweetbitter, 2023, Hales Gallery, New York, NY
- Whatever I see I swallow, 2021, M+B, Los Angeles, CA
- Perfect for Her, 2020, Capsule, Shanghai, China
- Clench and Release, 2019, M+B, Los Angeles, CA
- 11 AM Mirror Hole, 2018, Cuevas Tilleard, New York, NY
- Seether, 2017, Thierry Goldberg Gallery, New York, NY

=== Curatorial work ===
- Deep! Down! Inside!, 2023, Hales Gallery, New York, NY
- Right Behind Your Eyes, 2019, Capsule Shanghai, Shanghai, China
