= La Cruz (singer) =

Venezuelan singer and songwriter (born 1995)

- Born: Alfonso La Cruz; 11 November 1995 (age 30); Caracas, Venezuela
- Occupations: Singer, songwriter
- Years active: 2018–present
- Height: 5 ft 7 in (170 cm)
- Musical career
- Origin: Madrid, Spain (2018)
- Genres: Latin pop; reggaeton
- Instruments: Vocals; guitars; piano
- Labels: Warner Music Latina; Sony Music Entertainment

Alfonso La Cruz (born 11 November 1995), known professionally as La Cruz, is a Venezuelan singer and songwriter based in Madrid, Spain.

== Early life ==
Alfonso La Cruz was born in the capital city of Caracas on 11 November 1995. His family later moved to La Guaira, a coastal state in Venezuela.

At a young age, he would sing in his school's choir and would participate in festivals. At age 15, he was the opening act for R.K.M. & Ken-Y and Reykon for their tour stops in Venezuela.

In 2015, he moved to Madrid, Spain.

== Career ==
In 2018, La Cruz participated to season 10 of Spanish reality-TV singing competition, Operación Triunfo. Despite being the first to get eliminated, this TV exposure helped him continue in his music career, and gained notoriety for creating reggaeton music geared towards the LGBTQ+ community.

After his elimination, La Cruz released his debut single on July 26, 2019, Universal Music Spain. The single, Nadie Te Va Querer, accompanied by a music video, was slated to be released in June but ultimately delayed for various reasons. The single was later chosen to represent Spain at the North Vision Song Contest held in Norway.

On January 21, 2022, La Cruz released the single Fotos, along with its music video. On his birthday, November 11, La Cruz released his debut album, Hawaira. Within this album, Te Conocí Bailando became a viral hit within the LGBTQ+ community, many dubbing his music as "regayton" — a play on the words "reggaeton" and "gay". In an interview with UpRoxx, La Cruz states that deciding to write songs about men was freeing after a producer encouraged to write about his “long-distance” situation with another man. After the success of Te Conocí Bailando, La Cruz released a new single called, Quítate La Ropa, on 22 June 2023. In October 2023, La Cruz grazed the cover of Stylecruze's issue 43, a weekly fashion magazine. In December 2023, La Cruz was invited to Mediaset España’s Telecinco’s Christmas party known as Nochebuena Contigo, where he performed his hit, Te Conocí Bailando. On November 9, 2023, La Cruz released a promo-single titled Easy Boy, his first single under Sony Music España.

In March of 2024, La Cruz lands the cover GAYLETTER, an LGBTQ+ fashion magazine. On 18 July 2024, La Cruz releases his single Sahara, which was said to be featured on an upcoming album. The accompanied music video was released simultaneously via YouTube. The second single, Fancy, was released on 26 September 2024 along with its music video. In October 2024, La Cruz released his 2nd album titled, El Nene Vol.1.

In June 2025, during Pride Month, La Cruz graced the cover of Mexican queer fashion magazine ZERO. On August 19, 2025, Premios Juventud announced its nominees for its 22nd edition. La Cruz is nominated for La Nueva Generación Masculina (The New Male Generation). On September 8, 2025, La Cruz uploaded on his Instagram a six second Reel teasing his upcoming single and music video — titled Arequipe, which is set to be released on September 26. On an interview with Univision, La Cruz said “What I’m trying to achieve is to make an album full of varieties. I don’t want to sound like one genre”, regarding his upcoming album. On September 19, Premios Juventud announced La Cruz as a presenter for its award ceremony. On September 23, Maluka, a club bar, announced on their official Instagram that La Cruz would be giving a special free performance the following night on September 24. This would make La Cruz’s first performance in Panamá.

On the Todo Vale podcast, La Cruz announced his upcoming EP, El Nene Vol. 2, a continuation to El Nene Vol. 1, will be released sometime in June 2026.

== Artistry ==
La Cruz grew up listening to rock and pop-rock. Through his siblings, he got introduced to reggaeton artists like Daddy Yankee, Don Omar, Ivy Queen and Tego Calderon.

He also mentions listening to Latin artist Luis Fonsi and credits Beyoncé as his “Queen of Pop”.

== Discography ==
=== Studio albums ===
- Hawaira (2022)

=== Extended plays ===
- El Nene Vol. 1 (2024)
- El Nene Vol. 2 (2026)

=== Singles ===
==== As lead artist ====
- "Nadie Te Va a Querer" (2019)
- "Qué Sé Yo" (2019)
- "Efecto" (2021)
- "Fotos" (2022)
- "La Ducati" (2022)
- "Desnudx" (2022)
- "Te Conocí Bailando" (2023)
- "Quítate La Ropa" (2023)
- "Easy Boy" (2023)
- "SAHARA" (2024)
- "FANCY" (2024)
- "Arequipe" (2025)
- "Fuerte" (2026)
- "Gata Negra" (2026)
- "Only" (2026)

==== As featured artist ====
- "Notificación" (Nay Arias featuring La Cruz) (2021)
- "Rough" (Luísa Sonza featuring La Cruz) (2024)

== Videography ==
=== Music videos ===
Title	Year	Director(s)	Location	Ref.
“Qué Se Yo”	2019	Antonio Wimmer	N/A	
“Efecto”	2021	Alex Terrero/Edu Sáenz	N/A	
“Fotos”	2022	~~ALETOR~~	N/A	
“LADUCATI”	2022	~~ALETOR~~	N/A	
“DESNUDX”	2022	~~ALETOR~~	N/A	
“BOULEVARD”	2023	~~ALETOR~~	N/A	
“TE CONOCÍ BAILANDO”	2023	~~ALETOR~~	N/A	
“QUÍTATE LA ROPA”	2023	Victor Marin	N/A	
“EASY BOY”	2023	Falcon Films	Atlantico Estudios	
“SAHARA”	2024	Victor Marin	N/A	
“FANCY”	2024	Victor Marin	N/A	
“PRIVADO ft. VILLANO ANTILLANO”	2024	Daniel Eguren	N/A	
“AREQUIPE”	2025	Victor Marin	N/A	
“Gata Negra”	2026			

== Tours and performances ==
=== Headlining tours ===
- Promo Tour (2023)

Date (2023)	City	Country	Venue
September 16	Dallas	United States	Texas Latino Pride
September 19	Los Angeles	United States	Soho House
September 26	Caracas	Venezuela	C.C Lider Mall
September 30	San José	Costa Rica	Member's

- El Nene Tour (2024–2025)

2024
Date	City	Country	Venue
December 19	Madrid	Spain	Sala Mon
2025
Date	City	Country	Venue
February 19	New York City	United States	Elsewhere
February 21	Los Angeles	United States	Beso LA
March 7	Chicago	United States	Mansion Nightclub

- El Nene Showcase (Mini Tour)(2026)

Date	City	Country	Venue
March 15	Austin	United States	SXSW (Mala Vida)
March 20	São Paulo	Brazil	Coffee Party
March 28	Medellin	Colombia	Club Ora Culo

- El Nene En El Club Tour (2026)

Date	City	Country	Venue
September 12	Dallas	United States	Reverchon Park @ Texas Latino Pride Festival
September 19	Houston	United States	White Oak Music Hall @ La Cultura Cura
September 24	Monterrey	Mexico	Japi San Pedro
September 25	Mexico City	Mexico	KILENS
September 26	Morelia	Mexico	Mamá No Lo Sabe

=== Festivals ===
2026
Date	City	Country	Venue	Festival
March 15	Austin	United States	Mala Vida	Warner Music House @ SXSW
June 3	New York City	United States	The Brooklyn Monarch	So.Gay Party House (Pride)
June 27	Mexico City	Mexico	Angel de La Independencia	XLV111 Marcha del Orgullo
July 4	Madrid	Spain	Puerta del Sol	Madrid Pride
August 16	Oakland	United States	Frank H. Ogawa Plaza	Oakland Pride
September 12	Dallas	United States	Reverchon Park	Texas Latino Pride Festival

=== TV performances ===
2023
Date	Program	City	Country	Performed song(s)	Ref.
December 24	Nochebuena Contigo	Madrid	Spain	“Te Conocí Bailando”	
2024
Date	Program	City	Country	Performed song(s)	Ref.
December 31	Sabor a Uva	Madrid	Spain	“Easy Boy”	

== Achievements and awards ==
Award	Year	Recipient (s) and nominee (s)	Category	Result	Ref.
Premios Juventud	2025	Himself	La Nueva Generación Masculina	Nominated	
Lo Nuestro Awards	2026	Himself	Male New Artist of the Year	Pending	

== Personal life ==
La Cruz is openly gay. In 2017, he married his then boyfriend, at only 22 years old. Due to the COVID-19 pandemic, they divorced. He is currently single.

Talking about his experiences being gay in the music industry, La Cruz has said he had many meetings with label executives in Latin America, but in order to obtain a record deal, he had to “sing in neutral pronouns”. He also stated to 20 Minutos, a Spanish online news outlet, that in Venezuela — his native country, he has been denied security when performing in public.

== Filmography ==
Television
Year	Title	Role	Notes	Ref.
2018	Operación Triunfo S10	Himself	La Cruz was the first evicted in the 2nd “Gala”, or live performance.	
