= Oscar yi Hou =

English painter and poet (born 1998)

- Born: 1998 (age 27–28); Liverpool, England
- Education: Columbia University
- Known for: Painting, poetry, writing
- Website: oscaryihou.com

Oscar yi Hou (born 1998) is a New York City–based British Chinese painter and poet.

He is known for his portraits that are "never purely figurative, but position characters as richly complex ciphers", engaging with the "subterranean semiotics" of his communities. His oil-on-canvas works make reference to a variety of visual cultures and histories, from pop culture to art history, including Dragon Ball Z or Martin Wong.

== Early life and education ==
yi Hou was born in Liverpool, England. His parents left Guangdong, China in the early 1990s for England. In Liverpool, they ran a Cantonese restaurant for many years, where he worked.

In 2021, yi Hou graduated from Columbia University in New York City with a bachelor's degree in visual arts.

== Career ==
The same year he graduated, yi Hou presented a solo show with James Fuentes gallery. In a favorable review, The New York Times described the artist as "A painter who has many things to say, and is able to say them all at once".

In 2023, Hou presented a solo show at the Brooklyn Museum in Brooklyn, titled East of Sun, West of Moon. At age 24, he was reported to be one of the youngest artists to have a solo show at a major New York museum. He was named in Forbes 30 Under 30.

== Work ==
yi Hou's works has been described as "deeply citational, resulting in densely layered compositions that brim with imagery," featuring "semiotic constellations" of hieroglyphs, such as cranes, dragons, leather chaps, the yin and yang symbol, the American flag, glory holes, Western cowboy hats, and Spur, all as stand-ins for the artist and his immediate world. "There are a lot of ethical considerations when you present someone else," the artist is quoted saying for Document Journal, "When you represent yourself, you can make up a figure and do whatever you want with it."

His practice examines Americanism, imperialism, racial histories, gender, queer kinship, language, and portraiture. yi Hou often incorporates poetry in his work, producing what he describes as "poem-pictures."

In one of his essays, Hou coins the term "representationalism" to describe a sort of "political recuperation and defanging of identity politics by liberal multiculturalism to serve capitalist ends. It's corporate DEI. It's an ideology which seeks to represent, and often deputize, minoritarian subjects within larger structures of power."

Hou is inspired by the filmmaker Trinh T. Minh Ha, philosopher Édouard Glissant, scholar Gayatri Spivak, and political theorist Achille Mbembe, as well as painters Alice Neel and Martin Wong.

He frequently collaborates with fellow artists, writers, and poets. He co-curated 2021's Queer Out T/Here, a group show with nine artists, including Amanda Ba, Tseng Kwong Chi, Louis Fratino, Dominique Fung, and Lily Wong, who "examine the condition of 'otherness' across overlapping lines of queerness and/or East Asian identity."

In 2022, Hou published a book with James Fuentes Press, Oscar yi Hou, of poems, stories, and essays by the artist, Simon Wu, Xin Wang, and Kate Wong.

In addition to exhibiting at the Brooklyn Museum and James Fuentes Gallery, yi Hou has also exhibited in New York City at the New-York Historical Society and the Asia Society. He has also exhibited at Grinnell College Museum of Art in Grinnell, Iowa; the Carl Freedman Gallery in London; the Kohn Gallery in Hollywood, California; and K11 Musea in Kowloon, Hong Kong.

== Public collections ==
- Whitney Museum of American Art, New York City
- Brooklyn Museum, Brooklyn, New York
- Columbus Museum of Art, Columbus, Ohio
- Grinnell College Museum of Art, Grinnell, Iowa
- Institute of Contemporary Art, Miami
- M+ Museum, Hong Kong
- New-York Historical Society, New York City
- Cantor Arts Center, Stanford, California
