= Doron Langberg =

American painter (born 1985)

- דורון לנגברג
- Born: 1985 (age 40–41); Yokneam Moshava, Israel
- Education: Pennsylvania Academy of the Fine Arts (BFA, 2010); Yale University (MFA, 2012)
- Occupation: Painter

Doron Langberg (Hebrew: דורון לנגברג; born 1985) is an Israeli-American painter. Langberg paints in the style of genre painting and portraiture and addresses issues of gender and sexuality by making love and desire a shared experience through the surface and subjects of his paintings.

== Early life and education ==
Langberg was born and raised in Yokneam Moshava, Israel. He has been painting since he was in primary school. He notes that retrospectives by Lucien Freud and Avigdor Arikha inspired him to start making figurative work.

Langberg graduated from Pennsylvania Academy of Fine Arts in 2010 and Yale University's MFA program in 2012.

== Work ==
In 2015, Langberg was included in a two-person exhibition with artist Gaby Collins-Fernandez at Danese Corey gallery in New York. Jarrett Earnest of The Brooklyn Rail wrote of the painters, "It seems that Doron's paintings create an inner world, which corresponds to our world and pulls us into the picture psychologically; whereas Gaby's paintings set in motion a chain of associations that move outward, through their materials and forms—like the cheap crushed red velvet, for instance—towards references outside the painting."

In 2018, Langberg had his first solo exhibition in New York, Nothing Personal, at 1969 Gallery. The show included fourteen mostly figurative paintings made during his time at the Sharpe-Walentas Studio Program and featured some of the artist's largest works to date, including several 96 x 80 inch canvases. The paintings, rich with complex, impermanent surfaces, depicted various domestic scenes, such as figures sleeping, frolicking in bed, showering, and lounging, as well as several cropped portraits.

Langberg co-curated a group show, Four, at Yossi Milo Gallery in the spring of 2019. The group exhibition featured works by Felipe Baeza, Julia Bland, Arghavan Khosravi, and Oren Pinhassi.

Likeness, Langberg's first solo exhibition at Yossi Milo gallery, opened in late 2019. Works in the exhibition are both small-scale portraits and large-scale scenes, created through direct observation of family, close friends, and lovers, in which the artist contextualizes queer sexuality and intimacy within larger narratives of life. In a recent interview with Hyperallergic, Langberg says,

"Even with the sexual imagery, my intention was not to be shocking or explicit. It's part of our everyday life. There's something very intimate, but also something very casual about seeing your partner naked, for example. Experiencing those moments is part of who we are in the world."

Eric Sutphin wrote of Langberg's work in Art in America that.. "Despite an atmosphere of relative contentment, things in Langberg's works often feel impermanent. Edges blend, and passages are wiped or scraped away to reveal the canvas underneath. Such techniques convey the sense of fading memories." Langberg adds, "A lot of my works are of people that are close to me, so friends, family, lovers etcetera, so the painting usually starts with an idea about the image, like who I want to paint, and some sort of formal idea: either a composition, or a color scheme, a certain kind of materiality I want to use with the paint handling and that would be kind of the impetus to make the painting."

In 2020, Langberg was commissioned by the Public Art Fund to paint "Joe and Edgar", a portrait of the artists Edgar Mosa and Joe McShea that was displayed on bus shelters throughout New York City.

In 2024, Langberg debuted Part of Your World at Kunsthal Rotterdam, his first solo institutional exhibition in Europe.

In 2026, Jeffrey Deitch exhibited Doron Langberg: Landscapes in New York.

Langberg has noted a wide range of influences, such as David Hockney, Vincent Van Gogh, Édouard Vuillard, Pierre Bonnard, Mickalene Thomas, Alice Neel, and Wolfgang Tillmans. He is a part of a loosely-affiliated group of LGBTQ painters, sometimes called the New Queer Intimists, which also includes his contemporaries Salman Toor, Louis Fratino, Kyle Coniglio, Anthony Cudahy, TM Davy, and Devan Shimoyama.
