= Salman Toor =

Pakistani American painter (born 1983)

- Born: 1983 (age 42–43); Lahore, Pakistan, Pakistan
- Education: Ohio Wesleyan University (BFA, 2006); Pratt Institute (MFA, 2009)
- Occupation: Painter
- Partner: Ali Sethi
- Awards: Joan Mitchell Foundation grant (2019)

Salman Toor (born 1983, Lahore, Pakistan) is an American Pakistani painter based in New York City. His paintings often depict intimate moments in the lives of imagined young, brown, South Asian, queer men within fantasized settings. Toor received his United States citizenship in 2019.

== Biography ==
Toor attended Aitchison College and Ohio Wesleyan University, where he received a Bachelor of Arts degree in 2006. He then obtained his MFA degree from Pratt Institute in Brooklyn in 2009.

Toor is a part of a loosely-affiliated group of LGBTQ painters, sometimes called the New Queer Intimists, which also includes contemporaries Doron Langberg, Louis Fratino, Kyle Coniglio, Anthony Cudahy, TM Davy, and Devan Shimoyama.

In 2019, Toor was awarded a grant from the Joan Mitchell Foundation. From 2020 to 2021, Toor's recent paintings were the subject of a solo exhibition, Salman Toor: How Will I Know at the Whitney Museum of American Art. From 2021 to 2022, Toor's painting, Museum Boys (2021) was on view at the Frick Collection; as part of the artist residency and the exhibition, Living Histories: Queer Views and Old Masters where it is placed in a room in conversation with two paintings by Johannes Vermeer, Officer and Laughing Girl (made between 1655 and 1660) and Mistress and Maid (c. 1667). In 2022, in an exhibition similar to that at the Frick, Toor's works were placed in conversation with old master painting's from the museum's collection in the exhibition No Ordinary Love at the Baltimore Museum of Art in Baltimore, Maryland. In 2023, the exhibition traveled in a modified version to the Rose Art Museum at Brandeis University.

His partner is the New York-based Pakistani-American musician Ali Sethi.

== Work ==
Toor's work explores the treatment of brown men and young people in public and private spaces, as well as the role of technology in daily life. Curator Ambika Trasi has noted, "They are ruminations on the identifications variously imposed on and adopted by queer South Asian men living in the diaspora". In doing so, Trasi has written that Toor aims to include brown men in the art historical canon that is often missing this representation. Growing up in Pakistan, Toor explained an interview that he drew inspiration from Pakistani advertisements. Once he began to focus more on art, Toor found inspiration in paintings from the Baroque, Neoclassical, and Rococo eras. Specifically Toor describes being inspired by Van Dyck, Rubens, Caravaggio, and Watteau. Curators note Toor's art historical knowledge makes its way into his work. For example, critic and curator Joseph Wolin observes that Toor's The Bar on East 13th directly references Manet's A Bar at the Folies-Bergère.

Curators have noted that Toor's paintings use saturated colors meant to evoke emotion. Green is one of the most notable colors in his work. Toor draws from memory and often depicts his friends in his paintings. Toor illustrated Amitav Ghosh's 2021 book in verse, Jungle Nama. His work is included in the Whitney Museum of American Art and Museum of Contemporary Art, Chicago.

== Exhibitions ==
- 2008: Pratt in Lucca, Piazza del Anfiteatro, Lucca, Italy
- 2009: Pratt MFA Thesis Show, Stueben Gallery, Brooklyn
- 2009: Exchange Show, Montclair University MFA Gallery, Montclair, New Jersey
- 2009: Wounds, Aicon Gallery, London
- 2010: All about Us, Canvas Gallery, Karachi
- 2012: Letters to Taseer II, Drawing Room Gallery, Lahore
- 2012: Stop Play Pause Repeat, Lawrie Shabibi Gallery, Dubai
- 2013: Return of The Native, Rohtas II Gallery, Lahore
- 2013: Cinephiliac: Art Transcending Technology and Motion, Twelve Gates Art Gallery, Philadelphia
- 2014: Wretch, Honey Ramka, New York
- 2015: Salman Toor: Drawings from ‘The Electrician’, Honey Ramka, New York
- 2016: Go Figure, Aicon Gallery, New York
- 2016: Kochi-Muziris Biennale 2016, Kochi
- 2017: Deep Ssips, Honey Ramka, New York
- 2018: Are you Here? Lahore Biennale 2018, Lahore
- 2019: Home is Not a Place, Anat Ebgi Gallery, LA
- 2019: Them, Galerie Perrotin, New York
- 2020: How will I know, Whitney Museum of American Art, New York
- 2022: No Ordinary Love, Baltimore Museum of Art, Baltimore, Maryland
- 2023: No Ordinary Love, Honolulu Museum of Art, Honolulu
- 2025: Wish Maker, Luhring Augustine Gallery, New York
- 2026: Someone Like You, Courtauld Gallery, London
