= Max Kibardin =

Russian artist & fashion designer (born 1976)

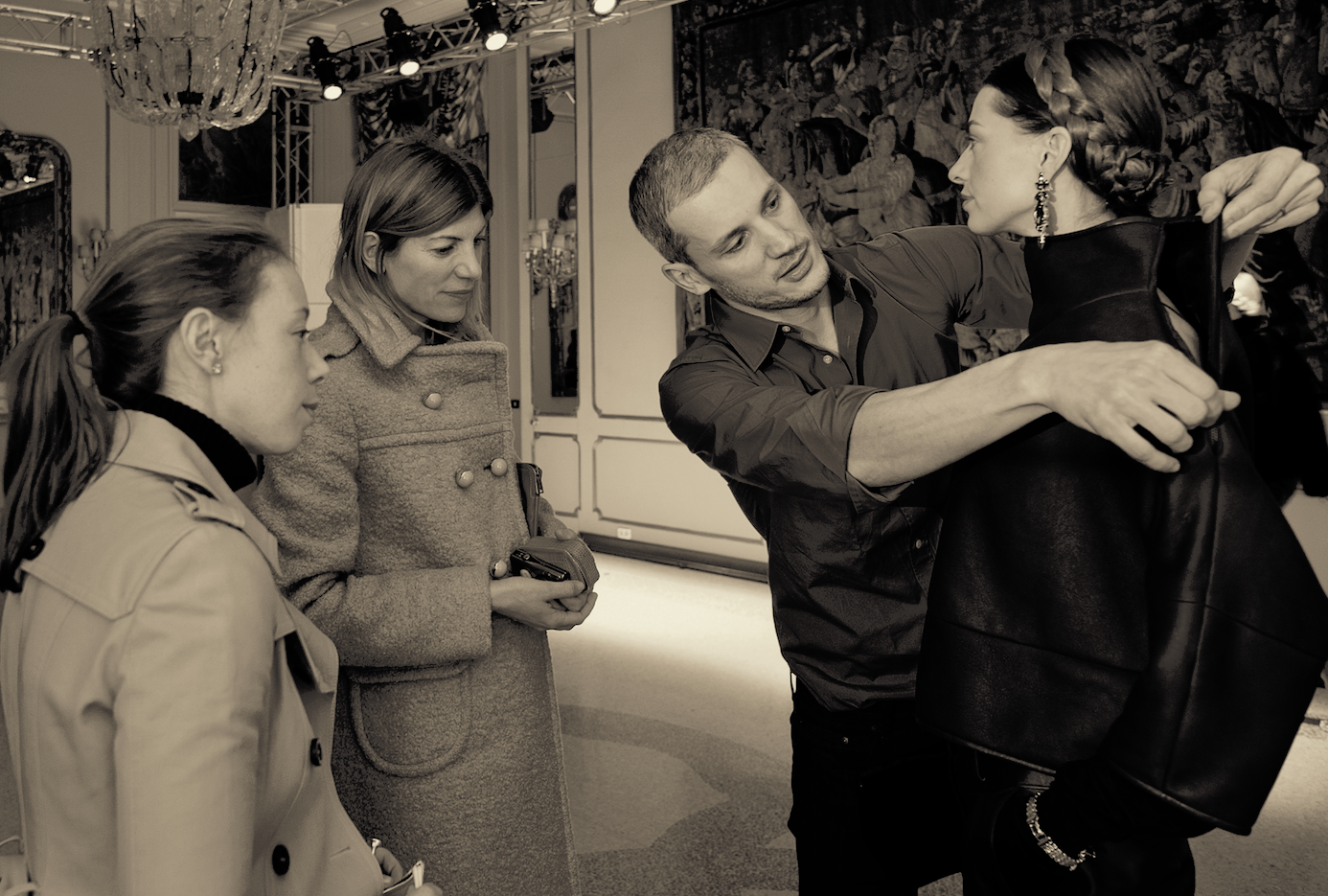
- Max Kibardin, Chief Creative Officer, Bruno Magli F/W 2013
- Born: 1976 (age 49–50); Russia
- Education: Fashion Design, Istituto Marangoni Milan
- Website: www.maxkibardin.com

Max Kibardin (born 1976, Russia) is an artist, fashion designer and creative director based in Lugano, Switzerland.

Kibardin is best known for his women's and men's fashion accessories brand ‘Max Kibardin' which has shown at New York Fashion Week. His work for, and collaborations with, Rihanna, Britney Spears, Alex Murray-Leslie (Chicks On Speed), Cameron Silver (Decades), Brian Kenny, Iké Udé, Noa Shadur, Mattel, Swarovski Elements, Mawi Keivom, Ralph Rucci, Reem Acra, Gilles Mendel, Furla, TOD's Group, Pringle of Scotland, Bruno Magli and Caruso menswear are well known.

== Early life and education ==
Kibardin studies Industrial Design and in the late 1990s is discovered by Karl Lagerfeld to model for L’Uomo Vogue. Modelling allows him to travel around the world, enter and understand fashion industry, enough to follow his passion, move to Milan to study Fashion Design at Marangoni Institute.

== Career ==
Kibardin opens his studio in Milan in 2004. Since then he collaborates with different lifestyle companies, doing runway shows in New York and London. The following year Kibardin establishes his eponymous design house.

In 2006, Kibardin has the opportunity to meet and present his work to Franca Sozzani, editor-in-chief of Vogue Italia.

In 2007, finalist of Vogue Italia 'WHO IS ON NEXT?', Kibardin is co-branding with Furla. Through 2007 and 2008 'Max Kibardin for Furla', the footwear and accessories line, is distributed worldwide in Furla flagship stores. After the first season Kibardin is appointed footwear creative director of Furla.

The same year Kibardin's line is recognized by Footwear News (Condenast USA and Fairchild Fashion Media) with Vivian Infantino Emerging Talent Award.

In 2009, Kibardin is the winner in the accessories category of the first edition of 'WHO IS ON NEXT? UOMO' by Pitti Immagine and Vogue Italia.

In summer 2009, Britney Spears performed in Max Kibardin custom made shoes in her worldwide ‘Circus’ Tour.

In 2010, while the Milanese designer is personally involved in the creative direction of different companies, his studio develops and manages several co-branding projects. 'Max Kibardin for Ralph Rucci', 'Max Kibardin for J. Mendel' and 'Max Kibardin for Pringle of Scotland' are to name a few.

In 2011, Kibardin is appointed Chief Creative Officer of Bruno Magli. Kibardin involves and collaborates with various artists, designers and photographers to help him relaunch the brand. In the consequent 3 years Kibardin has repositioned Bruno Magli with focus on US, Japan and digital channels such as Net-a-Porter.

Also in 2011, Kibardin designs the shoes for Rihanna ‘Loud’ worldwide tour.

In 2015, Kibardin's work is included in 'The New Vocabulary of Italian Fashion', exhibition at Triennale Milano.

In 2022 Italian menswear brand Caruso, controlled by Lanvin Group, has announced the appointment of Max Kibardin as creative director.

== Art projects ==
=== E-Shoe ===
The E-Shoe, the world's first wireless High heeled shoe guitar, is created by Chicks on Speed and Max Kibardin.

These shoes were first unveiled alongside Chicks on Speed's growing collection of self made ‘Objekt Instruments” - at “Chicks on Speed don´t Art, Music; Fashion” Dundee Contemporary Arts; Sonar Festival of Advanced Music, Barcelona; “It´s Not Only Rock and Roll baby”, Trienale, Milan; Kate Macgarry Gallery, London; Victoria & Albert Museum in London as part of the Power of Making exhibition.

Mario Testino took the famous photo of Kate Moss naked wearing the shoe guitar for the anniversary issue of Vogue Brazil.

=== Behind the Shoes ===
Behind the Shoes is the result of Kibardin's collaboration with Iké Udé, Nigerian artist who lives and works in New York. Inspired by Beyond Decorum, the fundamental piece by Udé, Kibardin designs six pairs of classic men's shoes in clear plastic with embroidered silk insoles.

In 2010 Pitti Discovery Foundation selects Kibardin to present a world premiere of his Behind the Shoes project. Kibardin poses twice wearing the classic gray dress of the artist. In the first portrait the dress is perfectly buttoned and impeccable, in the other Kibardin jokingly exposes the wonder of human contradictions.

=== Limited / Unlimited ===
In the occasion of Altaroma, the 'LIMITED / UNLIMITED' exhibition, conceived by Silvia Venturini Fendi, dedicated to designers working in crossover between craftsmanship and contemporary design, Kibardin designs in collaboration with Swarovski Elements a pair of avant-garde neo-couture stilettos studded with crystals and silicone spikes.

=== Menswear Swarovski Elements ===
In 2011, within Milan Menswear Shows, Swarovski Elements and L'Uomo Vogue, invite 16 high-end menswear brands to create, working with crystals, according to individual approaches and visions, a complete outfit or accessory. Kibardin designs a pair of jewelry-studded graffiti city-slippers.

=== Barbie ===
In 2015, together with creative team in the Design Centre of Mattel Kibardin designs Mia Farrow inspired Barbie doll complete with accessories for Vogue Italia Global Beauty Project.
