= Jacolby Satterwhite =

American contemporary artist (born 1986)

- Born: 1986 (age 39–40); Columbia, South Carolina U.S.
- Education: Maryland Institute College of Art; University of Pennsylvania
- Movement: Video art, digital art, sculpture, painting

Jacolby Satterwhite (born 1986, South Carolina) is an African American queer contemporary artist who creates immersive installations. He has exhibited work at the Minneapolis Institute of Art, the Museum of Contemporary Art, Chicago, Louis Vuitton Foundation in Paris, the New Museum and the Museum of Modern Art, New York, the Institute of Contemporary Art, Philadelphia, the Metropolitan Museum of Art, and the Pérez Art Museum Miami. He is based in Brooklyn, New York.

== Early life and education ==
Satterwhite was born in 1986 in Columbia, South Carolina. His mother was self-taught artist Patricia Satterwhite. As a child, he was diagnosed with bone cancer at age 11 and underwent several surgeries that left him with limited movement in his right arm and a prosthetic shoulder. During his recovery, he would watch Janet Jackson's video anthology VHS tape and play video games like Final Fantasy every day after school and in the hospital, influences that later shaped the fantastical, choreographed style of his digital art. Music videos by Deee Lite, Björk, Jackson, Chemical Brothers, Prodigy, Michael Jackson and Madonna also influenced his aesthetic. He began working with technology at the age of 11 when he got his first personal computer; prior to that, he owned consoles from Game Gear, Sega Genesis, SNES, 32X, Nintendo 64, Sega Saturn, and Sony PlayStation.

Satterwhite also attended the South Carolina Governor's School for the Arts and Humanities.

Satterwhite received his BFA degree from Maryland Institute College of Art in 2008, and attended the Skowhegan School of Painting and Sculpture the next year. He received an MFA degree from the University of Pennsylvania in 2010.

== Career ==
Satterwhite's work often utilizes his mother's schematic drawings/inventions of ordinary objects influenced by consumer culture, medicine, fashion, Surrealism, mathematics, sex, philosophy, astrology, and matrilineal concerns. Patricia Satterwhite, who died in 2016, was diagnosed with schizophrenia and was a prolific drawer.

Satterwhite has also shown/performed in group exhibitions including at Metropolitan Museum of Art, New York; MoMA PS1, Queens; the Smithsonian, Washington DC; The Kitchen, New York; Rush Arts Gallery, and Exit Art.

In 2016, he was awarded the United States Artist Francie Bishop Good & David Horvitz Fellowship. He served as a contributing director for the music video that accompanied Solange's 2019 visual album When I Get Home, in 2019. His visual work accompanied Solange's song "Sound of Rain." Satterwhite directed Pygmalion's Ugly Season, a short film accompaniment to Perfume Genius's 2022 studio album Ugly Season.

Jacolby Satterwhite's work occupied the Great Hall at the Metropolitan Museum of Art, New York in 2023. The commission titled “A Metta Prayer” encompassed video installations and large-scale projections influenced by paintings in the MET collections and the artist's upbringing and interest in digital and performance art. "A Metta Prayer" was later displayed at the Museum of Fine Arts, Houston in 2024.

In 2025, the Pérez Art Museum Miami, Florida, showcased Satterwhite's work En Plein Air: Diamond Princess (2015), a 3D animation video, as part of its digital arts biennial, Intertidal, on view through PAMMTV, the museum's video and digital arts streaming platform. Satterwhite's work was featured alongside works by Yucef Merhi, Keisha Rae Whiterspoon, and the artist duo LIZN'BOW, among others.

== Exhibitions ==
=== Solo shows ===
In 2012, Satterwhite presented an exhibition entitled Jacolby Satterwhite at the Hudson D. Walker Gallery in Provincetown, Massachusetts. The next year, the exhibition Island of Treasure at Mallorca Landings in Palma De Mallorca, Spain, included the Reifying Desire video series (2011-14), which was in turn included in the 2014 Whitney Biennial. The series combined 3D animation and live action, the work explores themes of memory and personal history in a virtual dreamlike environment.

In 2018, Satterwhite had a solo exhibition at New York’s Gavin Brown’s enterprise which featured the music video for his concept album, Blessed Avenue, based on the parts of songs his late mother recorded on cassettes.

Satterwhite had his first solo museum exhibition in 2019, at The Fabric Workshop and Museum, in Philadelphia, titled, "Jacolby Satterwhite: Room for Living," curated by Karen Patterson, after a two-year residency there. Bruce Nauman, Caravaggio, and Final Fantasy were some of the influences he cited in the work. The watertub and the handwriting around one element of the exhibition were designed by Satterwhite’s late mother, Patricia. The show was reviewed in the New York Observer and Hyperallergic. Satterwhite opened a second solo show, “You're at home,” at Brooklyn’s Pioneer Works on October 4. The work was formed around a concept album originally commissioned by the San Francisco Museum of Modern Art which used songs his mother recorded into a tape recorder. Together with guest musicians, such as experimental pop artist Lafawndah and cellist Patrick Belaga, Satterwhite and Teengirl Fantasy’s Nick Weiss expanded Patricia Satterwhite's original a cappella recordings from the 1990s into happy and melancholic pop songs. "It takes a low-fi form of expression–folk music recorded onto cassette tapes at home in the 1990s–and elevates it all the way to a 3D animated virtual reality, experimental performance piece and concept album," he told Frieze magazine's Michael Bullock.

=== Group shows ===
Satterwhite exhibited works in the Matriarch's Rhapsody exhibition and Triforce at the Bindery Projects in Minneapolis, Minnesota. The same year he exhibited works from the Matriarch's Rhapsody in exhibitions including his first solo show in New York, The Matriarch's Rhapsody, Monya Rowe Gallery, in January, The House of Patricia, Satterwhite at the Mallorca Landings Gallery in Palme De Mallorca in February, and Grey Lines at Recess in New York City in August.

In 2014 he showed work in the exhibition WPA Hothouse Video: Jacolby Satterwhite, curated by Julie Chae at the Capitol Skyline Hotel. Chae described Satterwhite's work as "visually spectacular, strange, and boldly combines humor with darker elements". The exhibition included the work Country Ball, which is in the public collection of the Seattle Art Museum. In the same year, he had an exhibition at OhWOW Gallery (now Morán Morán) in Los Angeles, titled How Lovely Is Me Being As I Am, the title of which he attributed to his mother's unique use of language.

Satterwhite's work was featured in the 2014 Whitney Biennial at the Whitney Museum of American Art.

In 2015 and 2016, Satterwhite was part of the traveling exhibition Disguise: Masks and Global African Art, a collaboration between the Seattle Art Museum (on display from June 18 to September 7, 2015 in Seattle) and from April 29 to September 18, 2016 at the Brooklyn Museum. The exhibition focused on African masquerade and the power of the mask and costume as a proactive and playful way to engage about current social problems centering around class, gender, and issues of power and to give insight into the future. The exhibition presented contemporary and historical works from the Seattle Art Museum that worked in dialogue and ranged in mediums from video installation to photography and sculpture.

== Honors and awards ==
- 2016 United States Artists Fellowship
- 2013 Louis Comfort Tiffany Grant
- 2013 Arts Matters Grant
- 2013–2014 Lower Manhattan Cultural Council Workspace Artist-in-Residence
- 2013 Recess Art, Sessions Residency
- 2012–2013 Fine Arts Work Center Fellowship 2nd Year
- 2012 Headlands Center for the Arts - Artist in Residence
- 2011–2012 Fine Arts Work Center Fellowship 1st Year
- 2011 Electronic Television Center Finishing Funds Grant
- 2011 Center for Photography, Woodstock
- 2011 Van Lier Grant, Jamaica Center for Arts and Learning, Studio LLC program
- 2011 Queer|Art|Mentorship Fellowship
- 2010–2011 Harvestworks Artist In Residence, New York, NY
- 2010 Toby Devan Lewis Fellowship
- 2009 Cosby Fellowship to Skowhegan School for Painting and Sculpture
- 2007 Grand Prize Winner for Driven exhibition at the Smithsonian Institution's S. Dillon Ripley Center

== Collections ==
- Museum of Contemporary Art Kiasma, Helsinki, Finland
- Museum of Modern Art, New York City, New York
- Studio Museum in Harlem, New York City, New York
- The Whitney Museum of American Art, New York City, New York
- Seattle Art Museum, Seattle, Washington
- San Jose Museum of Art, San Jose, California
