= El Nene Vol. 1 =

El Nene, Vol. 1

EP by La Cruz
- Released: October 24, 2024
- Genre: Latin urban • reggaeton
- Length: 14:26

El Nene, Vol. 1 is the first EP by Venezuelan singer, La Cruz. It was released on October 24, 2024 by Warner Music Latina.

== Background and development ==
When La Cruz began working on El Nene, he stated he "knew it was a tribute to my inner-child". He also said it was a thank you and dedicated to his fans who have been with him since the beginning.

With this album, La Cruz manages to bring his first collaboration with Puerto Rican rapper, Villano Antillano — on Privado.

== Tour and promotion ==
La Cruz embarked on a 5-city tour aptly named "El Nene Tour" beginning in 2024 in Madrid, Spain. The tour continued on to small clubs in the United States, Venezuela and ending in Costa Rica in 2025. On December 31, 2024, La Cruz performed “Easy Boy” on Spanish TV program, “Sabor a Uva”.

== Singles and music videos ==
Single	Release date	Music video location	Director & staff
Sahara	July 18, 2024		Director: Victor Marin Stylist: Nacho Florit / Arrypaul Choreographer: Kevin Velez
Fancy	September 26, 2024		Director: Victor Marin Stylist: Nacho Florit / Arrypaul Choreographer: Kevin Velez
Privado ft. Villano Antillano	October 24, 2024		Director: Daniel Eguren Stylist: Jordan Perez (La Cruz) / Vladimir Alvira (Antillano) Choreographer: Shadiel Reyes

== Track listing ==
No.	Title	Writer(s)	Length
1.	"El Nene"	Alfonso La Cruz • Geovanny Javier Shasiloa Caza • Luis Alejandro Goncalves Landa	2:09
2.	"Sahara"	La Cruz • Gio • Jorge Esteban Serrano Lobri • Joseph Suárez • Manuel Casares	2:26
3.	"Besties"	La Cruz	2:39
4.	"Fancy"	La Cruz • Gio • Landa	2:23
5.	"Privado ft. Villano Antillano"	La Cruz	2:19
6.	"Frío"	La Cruz	2:30
Total length:			14:26

== Charts and listings ==
Chart (2024)	Peak position
Brazilian Albums (ABPD)	77

- "Privado" is listed on Apple Music's “Amor Queer” playlist as part of their Apple Music Pride playlists.
- "Sahara" is listed on Remezcla's “10 Best Reggaeton & El Movimiento Songs of 2024” at #8.
