= Hawaira =

Studio album by La Cruz
- Released: November 11, 2022
- Genre: Latin urban; reggaeton; Latin pop
- Length: 21:02
- Label: Sony Music Entertainment España

Hawaira is the debut album by Venezuelan singer-songwriter La Cruz. It was released on November 11, 2022, by Sony Music Entertainment España.

== Background and development ==
La Cruz began working on the album unknowingly in early 2022. Speaking about the creation and meaning of the album, La Cruz explains “it’s different experiences in my life that deal with love and heartbreak”.

”Hawaira” is a portmanteau of the tropical locations — Hawai’i and La Guaira, the latter being the hometown of La Cruz. Talking about the album title, La Cruz recalls having no idea what to call it but remembering how he would always call his hometown of La Gauira, “Hawaira” to his friends in Caracas.

== Tour and promotion ==
La Cruz embarked on a 4-city promo tour across North America, Central America and South America.

== Singles & music videos ==
Single	Date Released	Music Video Location	Director & Staff
Te Conocí Bailando	May 11, 2023	Atlantico Studios	Director: ALETOR Stylist: N/A Choreographer: Úrsula Aguilera
Boulevard	March 16, 2023		Director: ALETOR Stylist: N/A Choreographer: N/A
Quítate La Ropa	June 22, 2023		Director: Victor Marin Stylist: N/A Choreographer: Kevin Velez

== Track listing ==
All tracks are written by Alfonso La Cruz, Geovanny Javier Chasiloa.

No.	Title	Writer(s)	Length
1.	"Precipicio"	Alfonso La Cruz • Geovanny Javier Chasiloa	2:47
2.	"Te Conocí Bailando"	La Cruz • Gio	2:40
3.	"Lo Niegas"	La Cruz • Anthony Xavier Benítez Elizalde • Camilo Rivera Muñeton • Gio	3:01
4.	"Red Flag"	La Cruz • JoSH • Joseph Raúl Suárez	2:56
5.	"EMOJI"	La Cruz • Suárez • JoSH	2:24
6.	"Boulevard"	La Cruz • Gio	2:26
7.	"Iguales"	La Cruz	2:51
8.	"imagínate"	La Cruz	1:57
Total length:			21:02

== Charts ==
Chart (2023)	Release date	Debut	Peak position
Brazilian Albums (ABPD)	June 23, 2023	12	12
