= Reifying Desire =

Video series by Jacolby Satterwhite

Reifying Desire is a six-part video series by American artist Jacolby Satterwhite, which was on view in the 2014 Biennial at the Whitney Museum of American Art. Satterwhite created 230 3D modeled versions of his body, animated figures, and his mother's drawings. Animating all of these elements, he performs in a digital "utopian and non-political space", combining his public reactions to art history, political histories, and pop culture with his mother's private drawings and inventions.

== Background and concept ==
Satterwhite's mother was schizophrenic and stayed home, unemployed, up until his teenage years. As a productive form of therapy, she drew pencil-on-paper drawings and diagrams that explained and envisioned potential product ideas after being inspired by late-night television infomercials. To her, the drawings would allow for a future promise of financial security if they were able to be projected out into the public before becoming products.

Satterwhite uses these drawings, along with the scrawled-out text accompanying them that describe the products' purposes, and turns them into three-dimensional objects for his video series. Using Autodesk Maya, a 3D-rendering program, the images are digitally traced by hand using a stylus to be then placed into a larger virtual landscape. Satterwhite pairs these drawings with other photographs, family videos, and his own pieces of dance and performance. The culmination of these elements is intended as an exploration of memory, personal history, surrealism, narrative, psychology, and reality.

=== Digital avatar ===
Satterwhite's digital avatar performs dance movements in the films' digitally created utopian realm, combining live action with digital creation. He combines elements of choreographer William Forsythe's dance techniques with elements of martial arts and, most importantly, voguing. The body moves at impossible angles, freed from gravitational pull, intended to further emphasize the utopian dreamlike nature of the world the films are set in. His mother's images are connected with his own body, art historical references, digitally rendered bodies, and fantastical structures. The special awareness of the physical realm existing between bodies and objects are reimagined and transformed, along with the world of images, and the shifting relationships between them.
