= James Fuentes =

American gallerist

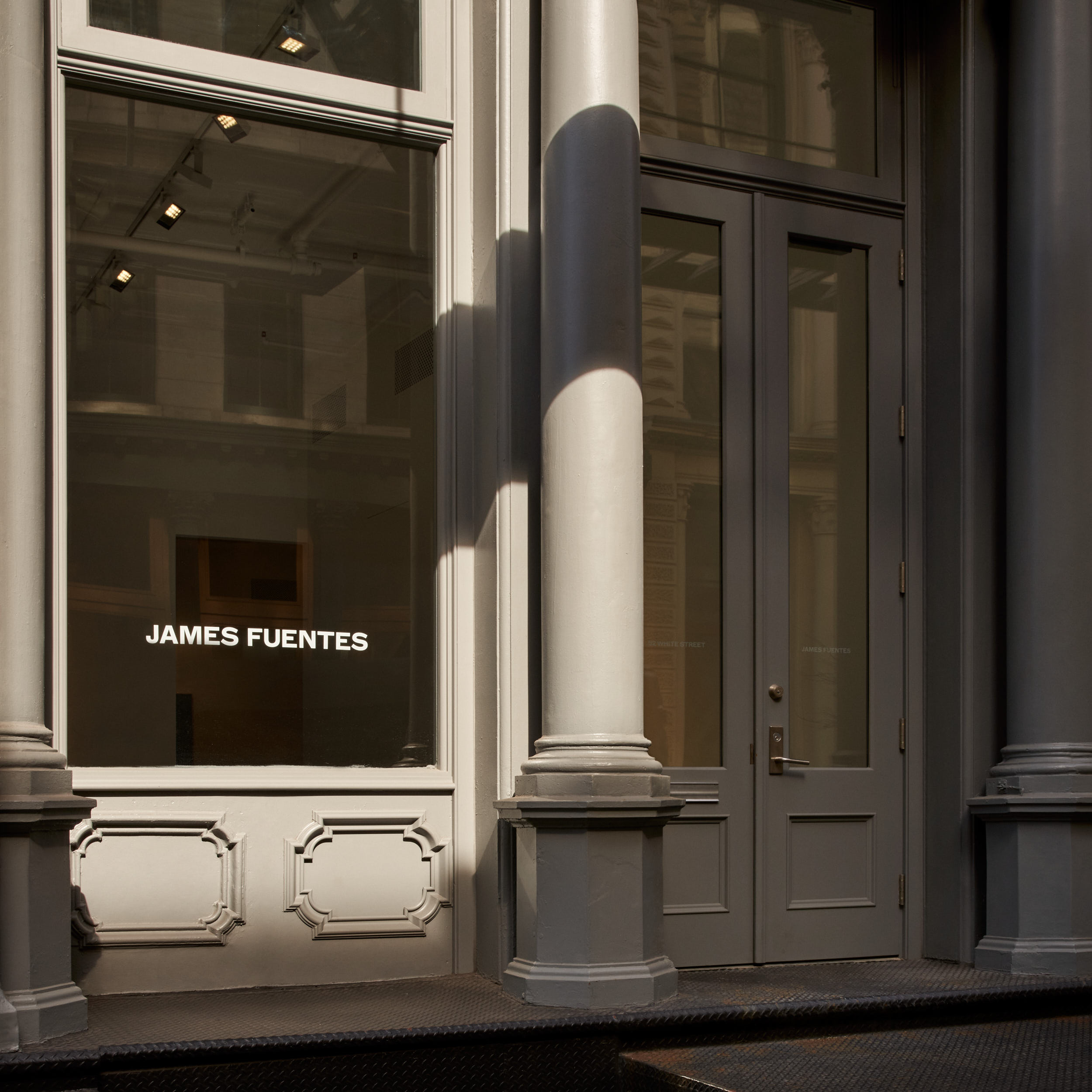
James Fuentes gallery at 52 White St, New York

James Fuentes is an American gallerist whose eponymous contemporary art gallery opened in Manhattan, New York, United States in 2007.

Fuentes was born on the Lower East Side in the 1970s to Ecuadorian immigrant parents and was raised on the Lower East Side and South Bronx.

== History ==
Currently, the gallery has three physical locations: 55 Delancey Street and 52 White Street in New York, and 5015 Melrose Avenue in Los Angeles. Previously, the gallery occupied two spaces on the Lower East Side of Manhattan including its original address at 35 Saint James Place.

Before opening his eponymous gallery, James Fuentes worked for several notable galleries including Gavin Brown's Enterprise and Jeffrey Deitch, where he served as a Director.

== Artists ==
Artists represented by James Fuentes include Alison Knowles, Didier William, Amalia Ulman, Oscar yi Hou, Dalton Paula, and Lizzi Bougatsos, and the estates of Juanita McNeely, Kikuo Saito, Geoffrey Holder, and Ed Baynard. Many of these artists have been exhibited in major exhibitions including the Biennale di Venezia, Whitney Biennial, and Prospect New Orleans, and international museums including Whitney Museum of American Art, Museum of Modern Art (MoMA), Solomon R. Guggenheim Museum, Museum of Contemporary Art Chicago, National Gallery of Art, Washington DC, Los Angeles County Museum of Art (LACMA), and Museum of Contemporary Art, North Miami.

== Exhibitions ==
Alongside regular exhibitions of represented artists, the gallery has also exhibited special presentations of artists like Lonnie Holley and historical works by artists including Thornton Dial, Jonas Mekas, and Andy Warhol, whose eight-hour film, Empire (1965), the gallery screened in full for the first month of the work's 50th-anniversary year.

The gallery regularly participates in international art fairs, including Art Basel Switzerland, Art Basel Miami Beach, The Armory Show, The ADAA Art Show, and Independent 20th Century.
