= Andrej Dúbravský =

Slovak painter

- Born: 30 July 1987 (age 39); Nové Zámky, Czechoslovakia
- Education: Academy of Fine Arts and Design in Bratislava
- Partner: Peter Bebjak
- Website: andrejdubravsky.sk

Andrej Dúbravský (born 30 July 1987) is a Slovak painter.

== Biography ==
Andrej Dúbravský was born on 30 July 1987 in Nové Zámky. As a child he wanted to be a scientist, but eventually decided to pursue art. He studied sculpture at the School of Applied Arts in Bratislava and later painting at the Academy of Fine Arts and Design in Bratislava.

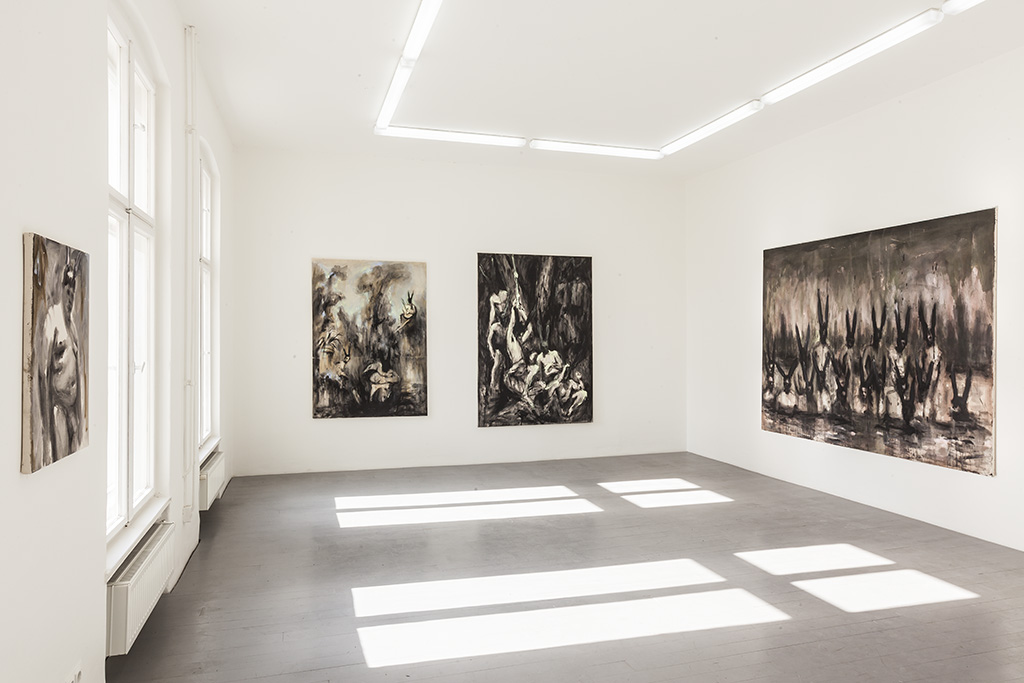
Golden Sands exhibition by Dúbravský in the Berlin branch of the Jiří Švestka Gallery (2012)

Following graduation, Dúbravský gained notability by organizing art exhibitions at unusual places such as a butcher's shop or abandoned construction sites. In 2011 and 2012, he was among the winners of the young artist competition organized by the foundation of the Všeobecná úverová banka. Dúbravský's art has been exhibited in Germany, Czechia, New York and at various venues in his native Slovakia, including the Slovak National Gallery.

In December 2023, the Minister of Culture of Slovakia Martina Šimkovičová criticized an exhibition of Dúbravský's paintings hold at the art gallery of the Radio and Television of Slovakia due to alleged obscenity and promotion of LGBT lifestyle. Her statement was widely condemned by the art community in Slovakia. Painter Dúbravský was defended both by politicians and activists.

== Personal life ==
Dúbravský came out as gay at the age of 16. Since 2011, he has been in a relationship with the movie director and actor Peter Bebjak.

He resides in the village of Rastislavice and in New York City.
