= Kanishka Raja =

Kanisha Raja (1970-2018) was born in Calcutta India, and later lived and worked in New York City.

Raja was an artist who explored the intersections between art, craft, and technology, and the gaps that open up as information travels and is represented through images. He participated in numerous international solo exhibitions and was a lecturer at the Yale School of Art.

== Early life and education ==
Kanisha Raja was born in 1970 in Calcutta, India.

Raja was the son of influential textile designers.

In a 2005 interview Raja explains how his parents "built something that’s lasted 45 years...it was the first model for me of how to be and live as an artist in the world."

Raja moved to the United States in 1987 to pursue his studies, living in Massachusetts and Texas before settling in New York with his wife and partner, designer Juli Raja.

Kanishka Raja received his BA from Hampshire College and his MFA from The Meadows School of the Arts, Southern Methodist University in Dallas In 1995. During the summer of 2000, he attended the Skowhegan School of Painting and Sculpture, in Maine.

== Art ==
Kanishka Raja was an artist whose practice explored the intersection of representation, craft, and technology, and the gaps that occur in the transmission of information. Raja created paintings, drawings, murals, sculptures, installations, and public art that moved between abstraction and representation, architecture and ornament, formalist strategies and narrative, and reconfigured different styles, iconographies, and histories into complex webs of postmodern critique.

Raja viewed his artistic practice as parallel to the craftspeople who worked with their hands every day.

Although, he considered the signs, symbols, and motifs of his cultural heritage as influencing his work. He was aware of the aversion to color and ornament in Western art and aesthetics, and the dangers of cultural stereotypes in the art world. Moving between abstraction and representation, Raja made work about in-between spaces and from between cultures. He engaged with both Western art history and non-Western culture on his own terms as a contemporary American painter.

Between 2000 and 2010, Raja’s paintings and installations reconfigured architectural spaces, signifiers and art historical conventions.

In 2017, several of his paintings, fusing elements from landscape painting with weaving textures and patterns, were featured in the group exhibition "Lucid Dreams and Distant Visions: South Asian Art in the Diaspora," at New York City’s Asia Society Museum. Raja also had a solo exhibition the same year titled "PostWest, v.2a: Ornament and Translation," at the Barbara Walters Gallery, at Sarah Lawrence College.

Raja’s paintings often have multimedia elements that are woven, scanned, printed, and embroidered. Raja described his work as addressing "the visual politics of neutral and contested territories, and reflect the multivalent, multilayered hybridity of post colonial urban spaces."

Kanishka Raja exhibited widely in the US, Europe and India and his work was included in solo and group exhibitions at the ICA Boston, ICA Philadelphia and the Rose Art Museum, Brandeis University among others.

He has had solo projects at the Armory Fair, 2012 and at Greenberg Van Doren Gallery, NY.

== Awards ==
He was the winner of the 2004 ICA Artist Prize awarded by the Institute of Contemporary Art, Boston, and was a recipient of a 2011 Painters and Sculptors Grant from the Joan Mitchell Foundation.

Raja has been a Fellow at the Civitella Ranieri Center in Umbertide, Italy and was awarded residencies at the Lower Manhattan Cultural Council and the International Studio & Curatorial Program in New York. His work has been reviewed in Artforum, The New York Times, The New Yorker, Art In America, Art Asia Pacific, Tema Celeste, Asian Art Newspaper and The Boston Globe among others.
