= Wayne Douglas Quinn =

American painter (1941–1987)

- Born: January 31, 1941
- Died: October 2, 1987 (aged 46)
- Occupation: Painter
- Style: Photorealism

Wayne Douglas Quinn (January 31, 1941 – October 2, 1987) was an American painter. He is known for photorealist works that explore queer male identity in San Francisco during the 1970s and early 1980s.

== Early life and education ==
Wayne Douglas Quinn was born on January 31, 1941.

Quinn lived and worked in San Francisco, California, of which he said "this is a mystical city. Once you leave San Francisco there's a whole other reality"

In 1979 Quinn painted author of 'Sex, Drugs & Disco', Mark Abramson.

== Work ==
Quinn worked to achieve a flat photographic effect, creating nudes in "lush flesh tones". The figures most often occupy detailed gem colored San Francisco interiors. Thomas Albright, art critic for the San Francisco Chronicle, said of his work, "Quinn's forte...is a kind of haunted realism" Quinn allowed "his subjects to drift into thought. The resulting facial expressions are a reflection of this quiet self-awareness, solitude...it has been said often that there is a sadness peculiar to Mr. Quinn's paintings" The paintings "are very much involved with the desolation of the urban experience".

== Selected exhibitions ==
Quinn's solo exhibitions include Wayne Douglas Quinn (1962–1972) at Upper Market Street Gallery in 1973.

== Publications ==
- The Art of Wayne Quinn (New Glide Publications, 1977)

== Collections ==
Quinn's work is held in permanent collections including:

- Herbert F. Johnson Museum of Art, Ithaca, NY
- Knoxville Museum of Art, Knoxville, Tennessee
- Leslie-Lohman Museum of Art, New York, NY
