= Platform Gallery =

Art gallery in the United States

Coordinates: 47°36′04″N 122°19′47″W

Platform Gallery was a contemporary art gallery formerly located in the Tashiro Kaplan Building in historic Pioneer Square District in Downtown Seattle. It was founded in 2003 by four artists, including Stephen Lyons, who in 2008 was sole owner. In late 2016, the gallery moved from its brick and mortar space to exhibiting and selling artworks exclusively online. In art critic Regina Hackett's 2005 Seattle Post-Intelligencer article on Pioneer Square, she credits the gallery with contributing to the neighborhood's "core of cultural tolerance and open-minded experiment". The gallery attracted attention for exhibitions of works on paper as well as contemporary photography and sculpture.

Platform officially closed at the end of 2023.
