= Jan Rattia =

Venezuelan photographer (born 1974)

- Born: 1974 (age 51–52); Caracas, Venezuela
- Education: North Greenville University (BA, 1999); International Center of Photography (2021); Pratt Institute (MFA, 2021)
- Known for: Photography

Jan Rattia (born 1974) is a Caracas-born New York City–based photographer who makes black-and-white figurative work.

== Early life and education ==
Rattia began taking photographs as a teenager while living in Venezuela.

He graduated from North Greenville University in Greenville, South Carolina, with a Bachelor of Arts degree in international business in 1999; the International Center of Photography in New York City in 2021; and Pratt Institute in Brooklyn with a Master of Fine Arts in Photography degree in 2021.

== Exhibitions ==
Rattia has exhibited at the International Center of Photography; CLAMP, New York City; the Bridgette Mayer Gallery, Philadelphia; the Houston Center for Photography, Houston; and Art Miami, Miami.

== Fellowship ==
- 2017 Carol Crow Memorial, Fellowship Recipient

== Collections ==
- High Museum of Art, Atlanta, Georgia – one print (as of May 2, 2023)
