= TM Davy =

Painter (b. 1980)

TM Davy (born 1980) is a New York-based painter. Davy paints and draws in the style of social realism and portraiture, recognizable for his keen sense of light and color depicting both the human and non-human.

== Early life and education ==
Davy was born and raised in New York, New York. Davy spent his early years fine tuning his technique at a summertime apprenticeship at the mural studio his father owned alongside highly trained Russian and Chinese social realist academic style painters. Davy notes that he helped paint the clouds visible on the ceiling of the New York Public Library before he began college.

Davy attended and graduated from the School of Visual Arts where he now teaches.

== Work ==
Davy paints a range of subject matter including portraits of friends and beachgoers, candlelight scenes, horses and ponies, and wildlife, typically highlighting the subject matter's interaction with light and shadows. "Light is the great connector in my art, and it has both symbolic and metaphysical values. "Sol Invictus." Indeed, it is the apriori pattern of our visual and symbolic systems. It is also the source of life, becoming in the leaves of grass," the artist says in an interview with CF Hill.

Davy's 2014 solo exhibition, "Candela," at the gallery 11R featured a series of intimately-scaled paintings of life-size candle flames.

In 2017, Davy debuted several small-scale and large-scale realistic paintings of horses at the downtown Manhattan gallery, 11R. The exhibition, titled "Horses," was inspired by an old photograph the artist found which read “195 Chrystie Street, 1880” that belonged to his great-great-great-grandfather. From the photograph, Davy learned that the gallery was located at the same space where his great-great-great grandfather's livery stable once stood. The sentimental and erotically charged paintings took more than two years to complete and have stylistically been compared to the Dutch old masters.

"This Marram," an exhibition of over 100 unframed studies in pastel and gouache, was presented at Van Doren Waxter gallery in late 2019. The exhibition showcased intimate scenes from the artist’s own life on Fire Island and included sketches of friends, fellow artists and writers, and drawings of his husband, Liam, alongside flora and fauna of the island. Davy's subjects for the show included the playwright Jeremy O. Harris, artist K8 Hardy, editor and critic David Velasco, painter Doron Langberg, artist partners Edgar Mosa and Joe McShea, photographer Wolfgang Tillmans, writer Andrew Durbin, amongst others.

Davy is a frequent musical collaborator with artist Morgan Bassichis. Along with DonChristian Jones, Michi Osato, and Una Osato, Bassichis and Davy have several produced musical iterations of The Faggots & Their Friends Between Revolutions a radical literary faggotry written by Larry Mitchell in 1977. Past venues for performances have taken place at the Brooklyn Museum and the New Museum.
