= Monya Rowe Gallery =

Coordinates: 40.74876°N 73.99380°W

The Monya Rowe Gallery is a contemporary art gallery in New York City owned and curated by Monya Rowe.

== History ==
Monya Rowe opened her first 200 square-foot contemporary art gallery on the south side of Williamsburg, Brooklyn in 2003. The first exhibition was reviewed in The New York Times by Roberta Smith where she called it "possibly the smallest white cube in the New York art world". The gallery has occupied locations in Chelsea, the Lower East Side and Florida.

The gallery has given many up-and-coming artists their first New York solo exhibition. Some artists include: Larissa Bates, Angela Dufresne, Josephine Halvorson, Vera Iliatova, Jacolby Satterwhite, Devin Troy Strother and Ann Toebbe. Guest curators have included Nayland Blake, Jose Lerma, Amy Sillman and the filmmaker Paul Schrader.

In 2015, Jerry Saltz, Senior Art Critic at New York, listed Ann Toebbe's solo exhibition at Monya Rowe Gallery titled "Remarried" as one of "The 10 Best Art Shows of 2015" (December 9, 2015).

After 12 years in NYC, the gallery relocated to St. Augustine, Florida in 2015. Holland Cotter of The New York Times reviewed the 2015 solo exhibition by Larissa Bates and noted the gallery's history:

" ... This month, after more than a decade in New York, Monya Rowe will close her gallery and move it to St. Augustine, Fla. Originally in Brooklyn, then in Chelsea, and most recently on the Lower East Side, her gallery is one of a handful of independent-minded, tight-budget commercial spaces that function as alternatives to a corporatized art world mainstream".

Monya Rowe Gallery received three consecutive New York Times reviews in 2015 for the exhibitions of Ann Toebbe, Vera Iliatova, and Larissa Bates.

After two years in Florida, the gallery relocated back to Manhattan in 2018, where it is currently operating.
