= Jody Pinto =

American artist

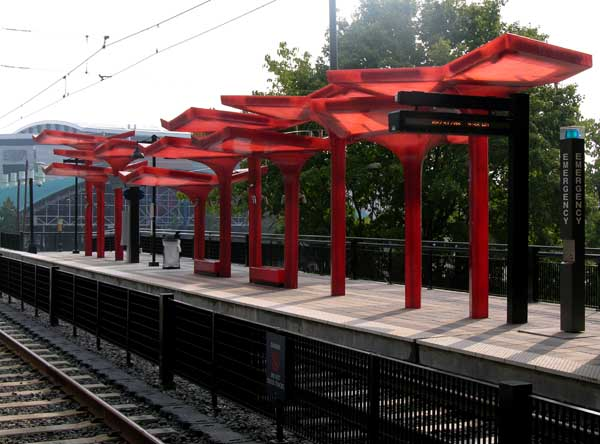
- Jody Pinto shelters on eastern side of Third Street/Convention Center station
- Born: 1942 (age 83–84); New York City, New York, America
- Education: Philadelphia College of Art
- Known for: Public art
- Notable work: Fingerspan, 1987
- Awards: National Endowment for the Arts Award 1979

Jody Pinto (born 1942) is an American environmental artist internationally known for her site-specific public works. In her work as an artist she has over 40 collaborations around the world including the US, Japan, and Israel. In her work as a feminist activist, she founded the organization known as WOAR, and was active in it for four years.

== Early life and education ==
Jody Pinto was born in New York City in 1942 to a family of artists, and carried on this legacy with both her education as well as activism.

She attended Pennsylvania Academy of the Fine Arts, winning the William Emlen Cresson Memorial Travel Scholarship while she was there, which funded travels throughout Europe after her graduation. She earned her BFA from Philadelphia College of Art.

== Work ==
Pinto's early works confront nature in work performances such as the 1976 digging piece Triple Well Enclosure, which explores excavation and entombment. Pinto's work was never rejected by the public, mainly because she considered her work ethic to be very attentive in what the client and public wanted out of the piece. Taking a break from her art to focus on her activism with WOAR she returned to her art after her four-year involvement, and had a new perspective on changing peoples lives through her work. Not only did WOAR give her new perspectives, but it helped her learn how to talk to people, and thus giving her ways to connect and make connections through her art.

=== Public art ===
In 1987 Pinto completed her first large-scale permanent public art work, Fingerspan, commissioned by the Association for Public Art in Philadelphia and located in Wissahickon Valley Park. The artwork is a 59'-long metal enclosure that connects two cliffs together in the shape of a bent finger.

In 2000 Pintos collaboration on the B.I.G (Beach Improvement Group) Project, was various installations such as restrooms, seatwalls, paths, and the "Beacon Overlook". They also landscaped and restored the Palisades, as well. as designed workout area and chess courts.

In 2000 Light Islands was created in Tokamachi City, Japan. This installation consisted of fiberglass tubes illuminated by interior fiber-optics.

In 2008 Pinto completed a permanent work at the Third Street/Convention Center station in Charlotte, NC. The work consists of 20 illuminated fiberglass canopies that provide light and also serve as shelter for users during inclement weather. The canopies range in height from 9 feet (3 m), 11 feet (3 m), and 13 feet (4 m) and are either green or berry in color.

In 2014 Pinto created a piece called Land Buoy which is a metal spiral staircase, standing 55' tall. This installation overlooks the ocean and land of the Washington Avenue Pier on the Delaware River in South Philadelphia.

== WOAR ==
Pinto founded the rape crisis center Women Organized Against Rape in 1972 along with Dr. Cynthia Cooke who was a physician at Philadelphia General Hospital where all rape victims in Philadelphia were examined after reporting to the police. After seeing how a close friend of Pinto was treated and dealt with after being raped, she felt that the system was failing women who were going through this trauma and decided to take action and thus WOAR was born. This organization was created through volunteers during the 52nd anniversary of women's suffrage. WOAR was the first center to organize city institutions to prosecute rape as a crime, and was also the first rape crisis center to gain access to a large city hospital emergency room. Pinto served as co-president until 1974. The activists working with WOAR found a huge benefit in working alongside politicians, and how impactful a politician's standing on sexual violence could affect their public image and influence. Describing how a Philadelphia politician not working with an organization like WOAR was considered political suicide. WOAR continues its work today (2021) partnering with community in its mission to eliminate sexual violence and provide services to any who have experienced it.

== Awards and fellowships ==
Pinto won a National Endowment for the Arts Award in 1979. In 1992 Steve Martino and Jody Pinto were given an Honor Award for their work on the PAPAGO PARK/CITY BOUNDARY PROJECT in Phoenix, Arizona. Pinto was given the ASLA Merit Award, NY 1993 New York Foundation for the Arts Grant Southern Avenue Streetscape/Patrick Park Plaza, Valley Forward/Honeywell, "Crescordia" Environmental Excellence Award, Phoenix, AZ. In 1994 she received a Joan Mitchell Foundation Grant. In 2002 Pinto and those involved in the B.I.G project (Beach Improvement Group Projects)of Santa Monica were given the National ASLA Design Honor Award.

== Selected exhibitions ==
Pinto's work was included in Extended Sensibilities, "the first exhibition to address homosexuality as a subject in art", at The New Museum in New York in 1982.

== Collections ==
Pinto's work is held in many permanent collections including:

- The Museum of Modern Art, New York, NY.
- Whitney Museum of American Art, New York, NY.

== Teaching ==
Pinto began teaching at PAFA in 1978. While there she started the first visiting artist program to bring contemporary artists to speak at the school. She taught at PAFA for 40 years, retiring in 2018.
