= Oren Pinhassi =

Israeli American sculptor (born 1985)

Oren Pinhassi אורן פנחסי
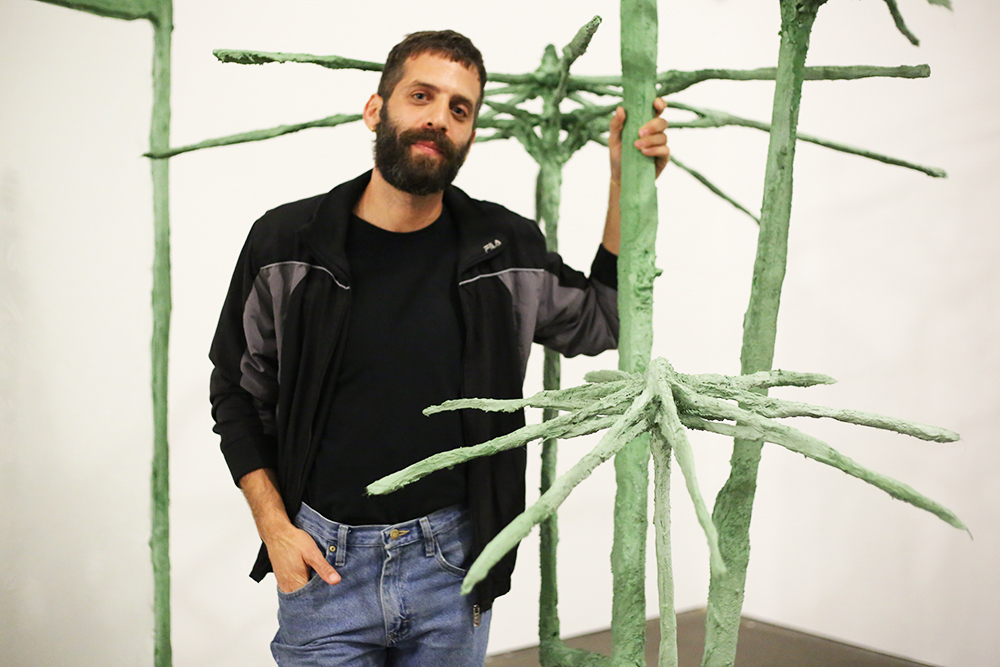
- Oren Pinhassi in 2018 with his work 'One in the Mouth and One in the Heart I'.
- Born: 1985 (age 40–41); Tel Aviv
- Education: Hamidrasha School of Art, Beit-Berl College; Yale University
- Known for: Sculpture
- Website: https://orenpinhassi.com

Oren Pinhassi (Hebrew: אורן פנחסי; born 1985) is a sculptor and installation artist who lives and works in New York City. Pinhassi is known for an approach to sculpting which creates a liminality between monuments and mundane objects. He often incorporates household objects, such as toothbrushes or plastic furniture coverings, paired with large scale work made from stone, sand, and bronze. His 2021 exhibition with Helena Anrather was titled Lone and Level, a line from Percy Bysshe Shelley's poem Ozymandias.

== Early life and education ==
Pinhassi was born in Tel Aviv in 1985. He received a B.Ed.F.A. from Hamidrasha School of Art, Beit-Berl College in 2011, and a MFA from Yale University Art Gallery (YUAG) in 2014.

== Career ==
=== Selected group and solo exhibitions ===
In 2018, Pinhassi had an exhibition at Skibum MacArthur in Los Angeles. In 2019 Pinhassi was selected alongside Felipe Baeza, Julia Bland and Arghavan Khosravi in an exhibition curated by Doron Langberg at Yossi Milo Gallery in New York City. In 2021 he had his exhibition Lone and Level at Helena Anrather in New York, Thirst Trap at Commonwealth and Council in Los Angeles. In 2018, 2021 and 2022 he exhibited in the UK with Edel Assanti Gallery in London. The gallery went on to exhibit a solo presentation of Pinhassi's work at Art Basel Miami Beach 2022.

== Work ==
=== Themes ===
Through his sculptural work, Pinhassi deals with queer spaces. Veronica Esposito describes this in The Guardian "as areas where things don’t sit exactly right, where individuals can become porous and vulnerable in ways that aren’t possible in heteronormative spaces." He also addresses notions of vulnerability and mourning as central themes in his work. Pinhassi states:

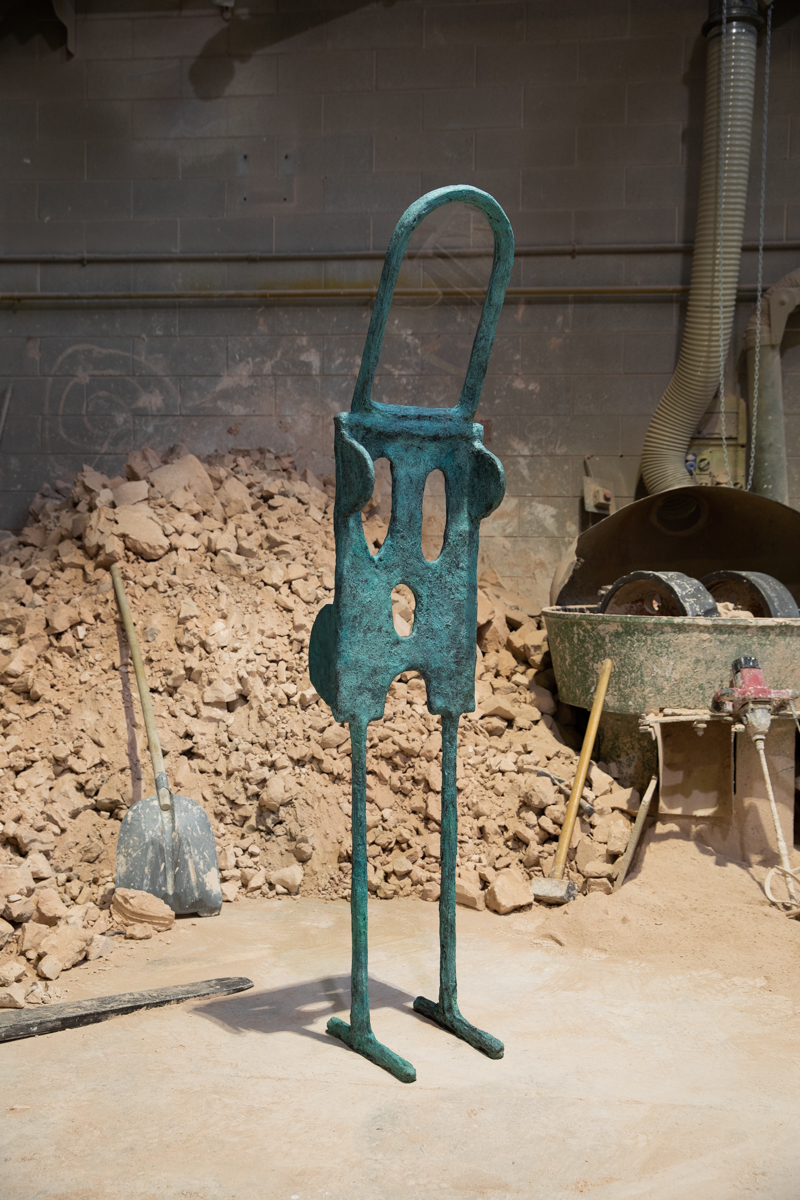
Oren Pinhassi, Standing Figure (San Basilio 2), 2021, bronze and tempered glass, 200 x 40.5 x 37.5 cm.

“My work deals with archetypes of structures and objects that act as networks that encase the living and the dead human body, that protect it or destroy it, that interact materially with it. Archetypes like: a bunker, a tunnel, a grave, a house, a mausoleum, a bath-house, a bath-tub etc; these are metaphysical cases of interaction between the human and the non-human. Materials are interacting with each other, desires and instincts as well, wet elements interacting with dry ones, organic body with synthetic body. I see these interactions as potentials for positive, constructive forces that can set new tools, production rules and new economies for the artist, and for thinking about our place within the universal continuum.”

=== Medium ===
Pinhassi predominantly produces work by layering burlap, plaster and sand over welded steel skeletons. As Michael Yeung notes in Wallpaper* "[...] He calls his sculpting process one of ‘repetitive touch’ – working away at the plaster with his hands a little at a time – no two objects he creates are ever exactly the same.[...]" From 2010-2012, wood featured heavily in his installations and it was this "frustration with the rigidity" of materials that drove him to explore the shapeshifting potential of plaster, sand and burlap.

In 2021, Pinhassi began producing works in bronze and glass following his residency at Castello di San Basilio, Basilicata, Italy.

== Awards and residencies ==
2016: Residency at Storm King Art Centre as part of The Shandaken Project.

2018: Awarded the Pollock Krasner Foundation Grant.

2019: Residencies with Castello di San Basilio, Basilicata, Italy and Palazzo Monti, Brescia, Italy.

2020: Residency at Outset Contemporary Art Fund, London, England.

Until 31 May 2023, Pinhassi will be in residence at Xenia Creative Retreat, Hampshire, England.
