= Louis Fratino =

American artist (born 1993)

- Born: 1993 (age 32–33); Annapolis, Maryland
- Education: Maryland Institute College of Art (BFA)
- Known for: Painting

Louis Fratino (born 1993) is an American visual artist. He works across painting, drawing and sculpture. His works centre around domestic scenes and contemporary queer life.

== Early life and education ==
Fratino was born in Annapolis, Maryland, in 1993; the second of five children. His parents are Italian immigrants. His mother worked for the US Census Bureau, and retired early. His father was a construction worker. He grew up near the town of Deale, Maryland.

Early influences on his art, and his approach to painting came from visits to the National Gallery in Washington D.C. In high school he read Charlotte Mullins' book Painting People, which exposed him to artists including Nicole Eisenman, Ridley Howard and Dana Schutz, which made him realise that "there was this whole world of people who were looking at things I’d seen in museums – but who were making work today", which excited him.

In 2015, Fratino graduated from the Maryland Institute College of Art (MICA) in Baltimore.

In 2014, Fratino was selected to participate in the Ellen Battell Stoeckel Fellowship at Yale Summer School of Art and Music, Norfolk, Connecticut. From 2015-2016, Fratino was a recipient of a Fulbright Research Fellowship in Painting and Printmaking, to study in Berlin.

== Work ==
Man, book, mirror (2020), oil on canvas.

Fratino's work centre around domestic settings, contemporary queer life and the male body. As art critic Roberta Smith wrote, his paintings are "hot with the pleasure of lying-around-the-house domesticity, of shared privacy."

Fratino paints from memory. His early paintings were of his siblings, parents and childhood home.

Fratino has also created several still lifes, particularly of tables.

Fratino is interested in the genres of painting (still life, landscape, reclining nude) and playing with these recognisable motifs.

Fratino's work is influenced by F.N. Souza, Duncan Grant, Bhupen Khakhar

Writer Durga Chew-Bose noted Fratino's debt to Cubist still life. Interview Magazine described his work as "neo-Cubism meets neo-Fauvism meets such radical American painting pioneers as Georgia O’Keeffe and Marsden Hartley".

== Career ==
In 2016, after completing his training in Berlin, Fratino moved to New York City.

In 2018, Fratino worked in Paris. There, he had his first solo exhibition, Heirloom, at Galerie Antoine Levi. Also in 2018, Antwaun Sargent, writing in The New York Times, grouped Fratino with other gay figure artists committed to depicting "the mostly unseen interior lives" of their subjects.

Inspired by Picasso, Matisse, and other Modernists, Fratino began working in soft pastel on raw linen.

In 2020, Fratino took up printmaking, working with printmaker Gregory Burnet to create a series of large copperplate etchings.

In 2021, Fratino was due to have a solo show at Des Moines Art Centre in Iowa. However, after Fratino had insisted the show included his work New Bedroom, which depicts two naked men having sex, the show was cancelled.

In 2024, Fratino was included in the 60th Venice Biennale. He showed his work I Keep My Treasure in My Ass. This title was taken from the 1977 book Towards a Gay Communism. The work depicts Fatino giving birth to himself through his own rectum.

In 2026, David Zwirner Gallery began representing Fratino. He has a show at their London gallery in 2026, inspired by Edward Burra's The Torturers (1935).

== Personal life ==
Fratino came out as a gay man during his junior year at MICA in 2014. His family was accepting of his sexuality. In 2021, he was in a relationship with sculptor Thomas Barger, and the two shared a studio.

Fratino lives and works in Brooklyn, New York.

== Exhibitions ==
=== Solo ===
Year	Title	Institution	Location	Ref
2016	Reasons	Platform Gallery	Baltimore	
2016	With everyone	Thierry Goldberg Gallery	New York	
2017	Own, Only	Monya Rowe Gallery	St. Augustine	
2017	So, I've got you	Thierry Goldberg Gallery	New York	
2018	Heirloom	Galerie Antoine Levi	Paris	
2018	Night and Day	Jeff Bailey Gallery	Hudson, New York	
2019	Come Softly to Me	Sikkema Jenkins & Co.	New York	
2019	Nudissima	Antoine Levi	Paris	
2020	Morning	Sikkema Jenkins & Co.	New York	
2021	Growths of the earth	Ciaccia Levi	Paris	
2022	New Prints and Drawings	Ciaccia Levi	Milan	
2022	Die bunten Tage	Galerie Neu GmbH & Co.	Berlin	
2023	In bed and abroad	Sikkema Jenkins & Co.	New York	
2023	Louis Fratino	Litografia Bulla	Rome	
2024	Satura	Centro Pecci Exhibitions	Prato	
2025	La scorza	Galerie Neu	Berlin	
2025	Spotlight: Louis Fratino	FLAG Art Foundation	New York	
2026	Prose	David Zwirner	London	

=== Duo ===
Year	Title	With	Institution	Location	Ref
2017	Matisse + Fratino	Henri Matisse	Cabinet Printemps	Düsseldorf	
2018	Angela Dufresne and Louis Fratino: Glazed	Angela Dufresne	Monya Rowe Gallery	New York	
2021	Louis Fratino & Tony Feher	Tony Feher	Sikkema Jenkins & Co.	New York	
2026	Fratino and Matisse: To See This Light Again	Henri Matisse	Baltimore Museum of Art	Baltimore	

=== Group ===
Year	Title	Institution	Location	Ref
2022	A Place for Me	ICA Boston	Boston	
2024	60th Venice Biennale		Venice	

== Collections ==
Fratino has work in public collections, including:

- Whitney Museum, New York
- Art Gallery of New South Wales, Sydney
- Art Institute of Chicago
- Baltimore Museum of Art
- British Museum, London
- Centre national des arts plastiques (CNAP), Paris
- Institute of Contemporary Art, Boston
- Institute of Contemporary Art, Miami
- Hammer Museum, Los Angeles
- Metropolitan Museum of Art, New York
- Morgan Library & Museum, New York
- Museum Brandhorst, Munich
- Museum of Contemporary Art Chicago
- Museum of Contemporary Art, Los Angeles
- Museum of Contemporary Art, San Diego
- Museum of Modern Art, New York
- Museum of Fine Arts, Boston
- Museum of Fine Arts, Houston
- Portland Museum of Art, Maine
- RISD Museum, Rhode Island School of Design, Providence
- San Francisco Museum of Modern Art

== Publications ==
- Fratino, Louis; Weitzman, Jordan (2024). Louis Fratino. Montreal: Magic Hour Press. ISBN 978-1-7389013-1-9.
- Fratino, Louis; Collicelli Cagol, Stefano (2024). Satura. Milan; Prato: Mousse Publishing; Centro Pecci. ISBN 978-88-6749-656-3.
