= Lily Wong (artist) =

Artist (born 1989)

Lily Wong (born 1989, Seattle, Washington) is a painter living in Brooklyn, New York.

== Education ==
Wong studied printmaking at the Rhode Island School of Design, graduating in 2011, and painting at CUNY Hunter College, graduating in 2020.

== Career ==
Wong has exhibited her art in New York, Los Angeles, Paris, London, Belgium, and Berlin. Wong's first solo exhibition was at Kapp Kapp Gallery in Philadelphia in 2020.

=== Collections ===
In 2022, the Rhode Island School of Design Museum acquired the painting Fire Moon (2021) by Wong.

=== Residencies ===
In February 2024, Wong was a visiting artist at the Pennsylvania Academy of the Fine Arts.

In 2024, Wong was selected to be a Silver Art Projects' artist-in-residence

== Style and technique ==
Wong's drawings and paintings are informed by her training in printmaking. Wong notes being particularly "drawn to paper" as a medium. Wong's figurative paintings contain a vivid focus on color. Informed by drawing and the language of cartooning, Wong describes being visually inspired by the glow and colors of television screens. Wong's work also explores the color yellow and how it relates to her own history as an Asian-American.

Wong credits many artistic inspirations including: the Veil of Veronica, her father's childhood in Hong-Kong, Wong Kar-wai movies, Japanese woodblock prints, Mughal-illustrated manuscripts, fantasy, folklore, anime, Eastern mythology, cave-paintings, Yoshitoshi's 100 Aspects of the Moon, cartoons, Sailor Moon, Chinese scroll paintings, and Maia Ruth Lee's Bondage Baggage series.

=== Solo Exhibitions ===
- 2020 - "Built for Love," - Kapp Kapp Gallery, Philadelphia, PA
- 2021 - "Lunations" with Ian Faden - Harper's, New York, NY
- 2021 - "I Wasn't There," - Kapp Kapp Gallery, New York, NY
- 2022 - "I Will Wade Out" - Various Small Fires, Los Angeles, CA
- 2022 - "The Beginning Place," - Galerie LJ, Paris, France
- 2023 - "Own Vortex" - Lyles and King, New York, NY
- 2025 - "Time, as a Symptom" - Lyles & King, New York, NY
