= Angela Dufresne =

American painter

- Born: 1969 (age 56–57); Hartford, Connecticut, U.S.
- Known for: Painting

Academic background
- Education: Temple University Tyler School of Art; Kansas City Art Institute

Angela Dufresne (born 1969) is a Brooklyn based American artist known for paintings that explore narrative in a variety of ways. Dufresne holds a BFA from Kansas City Art Institute, MO and an MFA from Tyler School of Art, Philadelphia, PA. She is currently faculty at the Rhode Island School of Design.

== Early life and education ==
Dufresne is originally from Connecticut but was raised in Olathe, Kansas. She is the first to have received a college degree in her lineage. Dufresne received a BFA in 1991 from the Kansas City Art Institute and an MFA from the Tyler School of Art, Temple University, Philadelphia, in 1998.

She has shown work internationally in exhibitions including Greater New York 2005 at P.S.1 Contemporary Art Center in New York City, the 2005 ARCO Art Fair for Galeria Marta Cervera in Madrid, Miracle on Franklin Street at GV/AS in Brooklyn, The Triumph of Painting at the Saatchi Gallery in London, and a solo exhibition at the Hammer Museum in Los Angeles, CA. is represented by Monya Rowe Gallery in New York, and CRG Gallery, also in New York.

== Works ==
As a contemporary lesbian painter, Angela Dufresne references other artists and films in her paintings to show connections to history and history of cultural production, as well as her personal experiences and associations.

Dufresne imagines a post-human body in her paintings and drawings that comprise mythical creatures and eroticism. She sees painting as a co-creative process, prompting her subjects to interact with the painting process through dictation of the backdrop and deciding when the work is finished.

== Selected solo exhibitions ==
- 2018 Angela Dufresne, Kemper Museum of Art, Kansas City, MO
- 2016 Pleasure Tips, Steven Harvey Fine Art Projects, New York, NY
- 2014 Let's Stay Together, Monya Rowe Gallery, New York, NY
- 2012 Parlors and Pastorals, Monya Rowe Gallery, New York, NY
- 2012 Celluloid Covers, Macalester College Gallery, St. Paul, MN
- 2012 Modern Times 1, Monya Rowe Gallery, New York, NY
- 2006 Angela Dufresne, Hammer Museum: Hammer Projects, Los Angeles, CA
