= Brian Kenny (artist) =

American artist

- Born: 1982 (age 43–44); Heidelberg, Germany
- Known for: multidisciplinary
- Movement: photography, multimedia
- Website: briankenny.work

Brian Kenny (born 1982) is an American multidisciplinary artist.

== Biography ==
Kenny was born on American military base in Heidelberg, Germany in 1982 and traveled extensively with his military parents until his late teenage years. He graduated from Oberlin College. Kenny is a long-time collaborator of Russian-born artist Slava Mogutin, with whom he has run the SUPERM project since 2004. Kenny has exhibited in galleries, museums and alternative venues around the globe. He has created commissioned works for Yacine Aouadi, Walter Van Beirendonck, Petrou\Man, Max Kibardin, Bruno Magli, Matthias Vriens-McGrath and Please Do Not Enter. One of the major themes in Kenny's work is exploration of his own sexuality, checking the boundaries between genders. In 2014, Kenny collaborated with the Visual AIDS foundation to raise awareness of the disease.

== Exhibitions ==
Kenny's first solo exhibition was held in 2008 in New York City. He had a solo exhibition at Indianapolis Museum of Contemporary Art as part of SUPERM in 2013. In 2011 he exhibited at La Petite Mort Gallery in Ottawa with Slava Mogutin. He participated in group exhibitions including Leslie-Lohman Museum of Gay and Lesbian Art, Station Museum of Contemporary Art in Texas, Haifa Museum of Art in Israel and Schwules Museum in Berlin.

== Personal life ==
Kenny is openly gay. His partner is Slava Mogutin.
