= Devan Shimoyama =

American artist

- Born: 1989 (age 36–37); Philadelphia, PA
- Education: Pennsylvania State University & Yale University School of Art
- Occupation: Full-Time Faculty at Carnegie Mellon University
- Known for: Painting, Queer Art, Mixed Media Art, Installation Art
- Awards: Al Held Fellowship at the Yale University School of Art in 2013 & Artist Residency at the 2015 Fire Island Artist Residency

Devan Shimoyama (born 1989 in Philadelphia) is a contemporary African-American visual artist best known as a painter that uses mixed mediums in their work. Shimoyama's work is inspired by Black, queer, and male bodies from a personal perspective. The exploration of mythology and folklore also plays a key role in Shimoyama's work. Shimoyama uses his work to examine the intersections of race, class, gender, and sexuality within everyday life.

== Early life and education ==
Devan Shimoyama was born in Philadelphia, Pennsylvania in 1989.

Shimoyama was exposed to creativity at an early age as his mother studied fashion design and grandfather worked a musician. Though starting off in music as a kid, Shimoyama would later begin to take art courses as his mother noticed his talent with drawing.

He attended Pennsylvania State University as a science major for his undergraduate degree but would later change his program of study to Drawing and Painting during his junior year. Shimoyama would later graduate with his BFA in 2011. Shimoyama was under the advisement of Brian Alfred during undergrad. He then went on to receive his MFA in Painting/Printmaking from Yale University School of Art in 2014.

== Artwork, style, and influence ==
Devan Shimoyama's work focuses on race and sexuality. He often incorporates glitter and rhinestones into his paintings, which consist of large-scale portraits of himself, friends and acquaintances, and figures from his imagination. These characters are drawn from a wide range of sources, from men at barbershops to drag queens. The materials point to drag culture and challenge traditional notions of masculinity and representations of wealth.

Through his work, Shimoyama analyzes the intersections of queer culture and ways it relates to Black American culture. These aspect can often be highlighted through the usage of fur, feathers, glitter and costume jewels including rhinestones and sequins.

== Solo/two person exhibitions ==
- 2025 - Rituals, Ulrich Museum of Art, Wichita, Kansas
- 2023 - A Closer Look, VETA Galeria, Madrid, Spain
- 2021 – Devan Shimoyama, upcoming exhibition, Kunstpalais Erlangen, Erlangen, Germany
- 2018 – Cry, Baby: Devan Shimoyama curated by Jessica Beck, The Andy Warhol Museum, Pittsburgh, PA

== Group exhibitions ==
- 2022 – In These Truths, Buffalo AKG Art Museum, NY
- 2020 – Translating Valence: redefining black male identity, Urban Institute for Contemporary Arts, MI
- 2020 – Tell Me Your Story, Kunsthal KAdE, Amersfoort, Netherlands
- 2019 – Getting to Know You, Cleveland Institute of Art, Cleveland, OH
- 2019 – Men of Change: Power. Triumph. Truth., National Underground Railroad Freedom Center, Cincinnati, OH
- 2017 – Fictions, Studio Museum in Harlem, New York, NY
- 2016 – Bedazzled, Lehman College Gallery, Bronx, NY
- 2016 – Cultural Landscapes, The Fed Galleries at KCAD, Grand Rapids, MI
- 2016 – Introspective, BravinLee Programs, New York, NY
- 2015 – UNLOADED, Northern Illinois University Art Museum, Dekalb, IL
- 2015 – Realities in Contemporary Video Art, Screening, Fondation des Etats Unis, Paris

== Collections ==
Devan Shimoyama's work is featured in the collections of the Pérez Art Museum Miami, Florida; and Buffalo AKG Art Museum, New York.
