= Slava Mogutin =

New York-based Russian artist and author (born 1974)

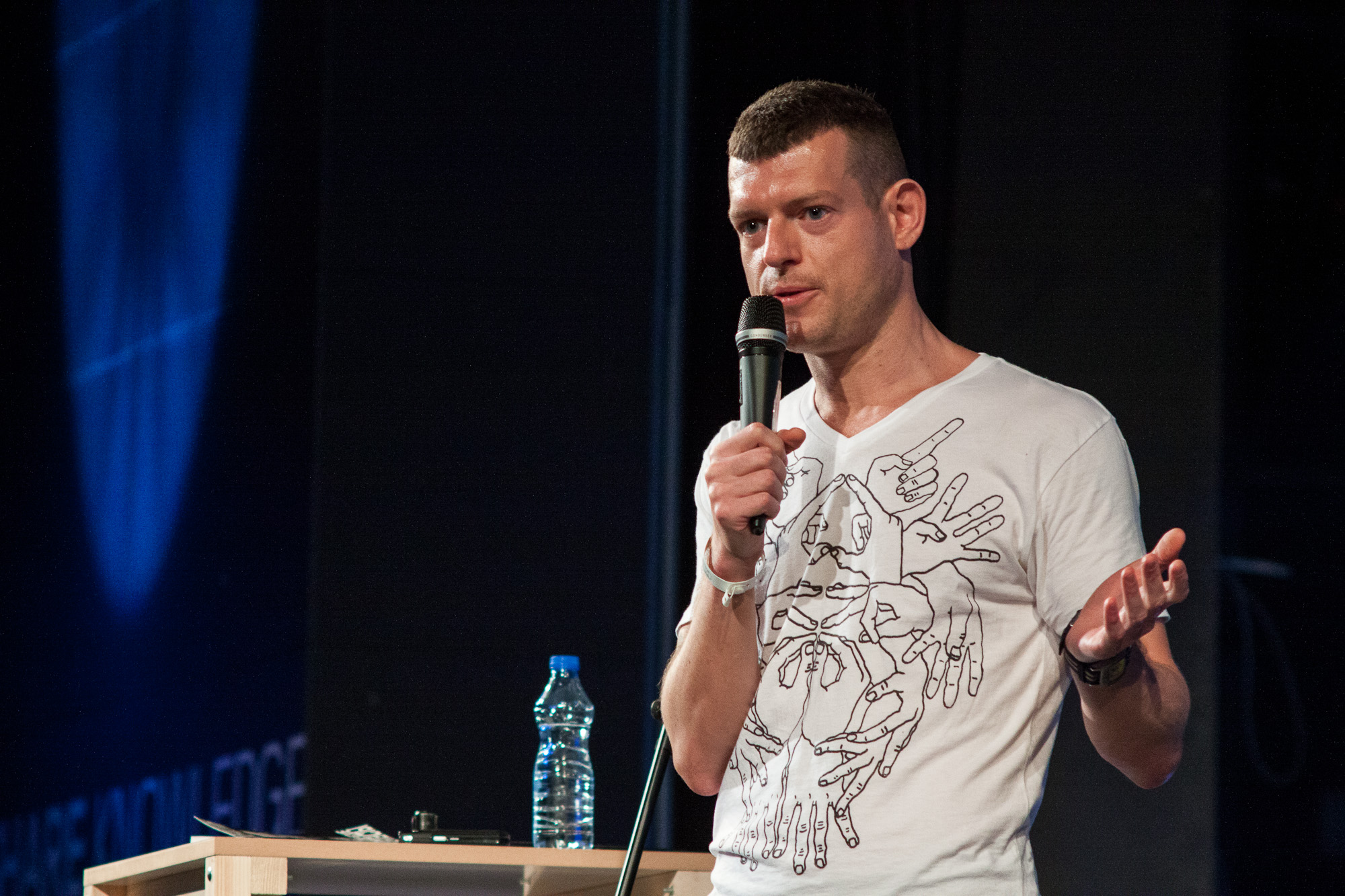
- Slava Mogutin at a conference in Beirut, 2012
- Born: Yaroslav Yurievich Mogutin; April 12, 1974 (age 52); Kemerovo, Kemerovo Oblast, Russian SFSR, Soviet Union
- Known for: Photography, multimedia, visual arts, literature
- Notable work: Lost Boys; NYC Go-Go; Environmental Pictures

Slava Mogutin (born Yaroslav Yurievich Mogutin; April 12, 1974) is a Russian-born New York City–based Russian artist and author, who works across different media, including photography, video, text, installation, sculpture, and painting.

== Life in Russia ==
Born in Siberia, in the industrial city of Kemerovo, Mogutin moved to Moscow as a teenager to separate himself from the elders. He soon began working as a journalist for the first independent Russian publishers, newspapers and radio stations.

At the age of 21, Mogutin had gained both critical acclaim and official condemnation for his outspoken queer writings and activism. Accused of "open and deliberate contempt for generally accepted moral norms"; "malicious hooliganism with exceptional cynicism and extreme insolence"; "inflaming social, national, and religious division"; "propaganda of brutal violence, psychic pathology, and sexual perversions" – he came under harassment and a continuous criminal investigation. The situation escalated further when Mogutin attempted to register for the first same-sex marriage in Russian history with his partner at the time Robert Filippini. This led him to become the target of two highly publicized criminal cases, carrying a potential prison sentence of up to 7 years. The criminal cases were initiated after his publications in Novy Vzglyad – scandalous political independent newspaper headed at the time by Yevgeny Dodolev. In one of the articles titled "The Chechen Knot", Mogutin, in the wake of the War in Chechnya which Mogutin supported, repeated demeaning and racist tropes against Chechens, which led to charges of inciting racial hatred. In his interviews, Dodolev said that "the "Mogutin case" was just an excuse to launch a political campaign against him (Dodolev) and his newspaper with the help, as he believes, of Andrei Makarov". Confined to about three years of house arrest and increasing tension with the lingering criminal cases, Mogutin's lawyers advised him to flee, after which he went to the United States and applied for asylum.

Despite his homosexuality, Mogutin aligned with nationalist political causes. In Novy Vzglyad, Mogutin met scandalous writer Eduard Limonov, who eventually became his spiritual mentor. Mogutin joined Limonov's National Bolshevik Party and also associated with ultranationalist politician Vladimir Zhirinovsky.

== Exile in New York ==
Forced to leave Russia, Mogutin was granted political asylum in the US with the support of Amnesty International and PEN American Center in 1995. This asylum to the US became the first to be granted based on homophobic prosecution. Upon his arrival in New York City, he shifted his focus to visual art and became an active member of the downtown art scene. Since 1999, his photography has been exhibited internationally and featured in a wide range of publications including The New York Times, The Village Voice, i-D, Visionaire, L'Uomo Vogue, Secret Behavior, and BUTT.

Mogutin is the author of several hardcover monographs of photography, including Lost Boys and NYC Go-Go. Additionally, he has written seven books in Russian. Inspiration for the images in Lost Boys is said to have come from his return to Russia when Vladimir Putin took office in 2000 and charges against Mogutin were lifted.

Mogutin is the winner of the Andrei Belyi Prize for Literature (2000). His poetry, fiction, essays, and interviews have appeared in numerous publications and anthologies in 6 languages. He has translated into Russian Allen Ginsberg's poetry, William S. Burroughs' essays and Dennis Cooper's fiction. He appeared as an actor in Bruce LaBruce's agitprop porn movie Skin Flick (1999) and Laura Colella's independent feature Stay Until Tomorrow (2004).

In 2004, together with his partner-collaborator Brian Kenny, he co-founded SUPERM, a multimedia art team responsible for site-specific gallery and museum shows in New York City, Los Angeles, Moscow, Berlin, London, Oslo, Bergen, Haifa, and León, Spain.

On July 14, 2017, Mogutin published his newest monograph, Bros and Brosephines. The book features collection of photographs taken during the last two decades.

After becoming a US citizen in 2011, Mogutin officially changed his name to Slava. Mogutin continues to work on his multimedia art and has publicly criticized the president of Russia, Vladimir Putin for his homophobic political policies.

== Contemporary exhibitions ==
- On August 2, 2013, Mogutin debuted "In The Name of Love", at iMOCA in Indianapolis. It was curated by the Madrid-born culture writer and editor, Karla D. Romero. It was a collaborative exhibition of individual pieces by Mogutin and others from SUPERM.
- On November 21, 2014, Mogutin and Kenny opened "AMORESUPERM" at LaFresh Gallery in Madrid, run by Argentine-born LGBT icon, Topacio Freshes.

== Works ==
- Mogutin, Slava (2006). Lost Boys. Brooklyn, NY: PowerHouse. ISBN 9781576873304.
  - Mogutin, Slava (2006). Lost Boys limited edition. Brooklyn, NY: PowerHouse. ISBN 9781576873458.
- Mogutin, Slava (2008). NYC Go-Go. New York: PowerHouse. ISBN 9781576874431.
- Mogutin, Slava (2017). Bros & Brosephines. Getsy, David, Wandrag, January 1976 Brooklyn, NY: Powerhouse. ISBN 9781576878248.
