= Anthony Cudahy =

American painter (born 1989)

- Born: 1989 (age 36–37)
- Education: Pratt Institute (BFA, 2011); Hunter College (MFA, 2020)
- Occupation: Painter
- Spouse: Ian Lewandowski
- Website: anthonycudahy.com

Anthony Cudahy (born 1989) is a contemporary American painter whose work addresses queer experience and the relationship between contemporary figurative painting and its historical precedents.

He creates figurative compositions that draw on personal photographs, queer archival imagery, art history, and film stills. His paintings are often rendered with areas of phosphorescent color against denser, muted passages.

== Early life and education ==
Anthony Cudahy was born in 1989 and grew up in Fort Myers, Florida. He moved to New York City and earned a Bachelor of Fine Arts from Pratt Institute in 2011. He completed a Master of Fine Arts at Hunter College in 2020.

== Career ==
After graduating from Pratt in 2011, Cudahy worked as a graphic designer for nearly a decade while continuing to paint. In 2013–14, he was an artist-in-residence at the ARTHA Project in the Brooklyn Navy Yard. His first solo exhibition, Heaven Inside, opened at Uprise Art Outpost in 2014. He is represented by GRIMM, Hales Gallery, and Semiose.

== Work ==
Ian and Alex (2024), oil on linen. Cudahy repeatedly paints his husband, photographer Ian Lewandowski, and close friends; a review described the work's scene of everyday domesticity.

Cudahy's paintings pair delicate figural drawing with broad abstract passages. His subjects are often solitary figures or couples in dreamlike, ambiguous settings. He repeatedly paints people from his life, including his husband and close friends, in scenes that range from observational portraits to allegorical narratives, open to interpretation.

Cudahy works from a personal archive of snapshots, film stills, screenshots, and historical queer photographs. By repainting these appropriated images, he shifts their original context to surface intimate moments and marginalized stories, particularly those tied to queer experience. He cites Pieter Bruegel the Elder, Albrecht Dürer, Lucian Freud, Caspar David Friedrich, Chris Ofili, and Jenny Saville as influences.

Cudahy typically works wet-on-wet in long sessions, aiming to complete each painting's first layer in one sitting to preserve its luminosity and energy. Cudahy also makes colored pencil drawings.

== Critical reception ==
Cudahy's work has been described as depicting "queer intimacy in the mundane" and blurring "the mundane and the sacred." The writer and archivist John Belknap wrote in Artsy that Cudahy "a serious painter who's also an unpredictable storyteller" and "a reliable narrator of the era." Critics have compared his work to that of Peter Doig and Salman Toor; he has also been grouped alongside Janiva Ellis, Genieve Figgis, and Cy Gavin as contemporaries working in a similar figurative mode. L'Express likened Cudahy's precision in drawing and use of color to David Hockney's, and described his éclectisme audacieux (transl. "bold eclecticism") as unmatched among young figurative painters internationally. BOMB described his practice as "painting that thinks through other images," noting how he reinterpreted works by neglected and often unattributed older artists.

== Personal life ==
Cudahy lives and works in Brooklyn with his husband, photographer Ian Lewandowski.

== Exhibitions ==
- Heaven Inside, Uprise Art Outpost, Chelsea, NY, 2014
- Recent Work, Artha Project Space, Long Island City, NY, 2015
- The Fourth Part of the Day, Farewell Books, Austin, TX, 2015
- EatF_3, Mumbo's Outfit, within Geary Contemporary, New York, NY, 2016
- NARSOLIPS, Cooler Gallery, Brooklyn, NY, 2016
- The Gathering, The Java Project, Brooklyn, NY, 2018
- Night Paintings, 1969 Gallery, New York, NY, 2018
- Anthony Cudahy: Burn Across the Breeze, 1969 Gallery, New York, NY, 2021
- Anthony Cudahy, The Moon Sets a Knife, Semiose Gallery, Paris, France, 2021
- Coral Room, Hales Gallery, New York, NY, 2021
- Anthony Cudahy, Flames, Semiose Gallery, Paris, France, 2021
- Double Spar, dual exhibition: Hales Gallery and GRIMM, London, UK, 2023
- Conversation, Musée des Beaux-Arts de Dole, France, 2023
- Fool's Gold, Hales Gallery, New York, NY, 2024
- Fool's Errand, Grimm Gallery, London, UK, 2024 and Grimm Gallery, New York, NY, 2024
- Spinneret, Ogunquit Museum of American Art, Maine, 2024; traveled to the Green Family Art Foundation, Dallas, Texas

== Collections ==
Cudahy's work is in the permanent collections of several institutions, including:

- Baltimore Museum of Art, Baltimore, MD
- Cantor Arts Center at Stanford University, Stanford, CA
- Dallas Museum of Art, TX
- Institute of Contemporary Art, Miami, FL
- Kunstmuseum, The Hague, the Netherlands
- Les Arts au Mur Artothèque, Pessac, France
- Musée d'Art Moderne de Paris, Paris, France
- New York Historical Society, New York, NY
- Speed Art Museum, Louisville, KY
- Stedelijk Museum, Amsterdam, Netherlands
