= Edgar Mosa =

American jewelry designer (born 1986)

Edgar Mosa (born 1986, Lisbon, Portugal) is a Portuguese-born American jeweler and visual artist. Mosa's work has been featured internationally at the Racine Art Museum, Racine, Wisconsin, Center for Art in Wood, Philadelphia, Pennsylvania, and The Stedelijk Museum, Amsterdam, Netherlands. In 2022, Mosa and his partner Joe McShea, installed Flags, Paris 2022, a site-specific installation for Loewe's Fall/Winter 2022 collection.

== Early life and education ==
Mosa was born in Lisbon, Portugal in 1986. He trained as a goldsmith from an early age. He received his Bachelor of Design at the Gerrit Rietveld Academy and a MFA at Cranbrook Academy of Art.

== Work ==
Mosa exhibited jewelry and metal work in 2011 at Gallery Louise Smit in Amsterdam.

In 2014, Mosa wrote an essay, titled A Look Into The Work Of Jean Paul Gaultier: Gender Amalgamation And The Musing Of The Maker for the exhibitionThe Fashion World of Jean Paul Gaultier: From the Sidewalk to the Catwalk at The Brooklyn Museum. Mosa collaborated with Hotel Particulier, a boutique gallery space, in Paris, France.

Mosa had a solo exhibition called Indentations at Jewelers’ Werk in 2017. Later that year, Mosa showed at Chamber gallery's group exhibition, Domestic Appeal, curated by Matylda Krzykowski. He exhibited Inverted Dart Game, an interactive game where players throw cork balls onto spikes, blurring the lines between craft, utility, and playfulness signature to his practice.

In 2018, Mosa attended the residency Palazzo Monti in Brescia, Italy.

For Jonathan Anderson's Fall/Winter 2022 Loewe Menswear collection, Mosa collaborated with husband and artistic partner Joe McShea to install over 87 flag multi-colored flags atop sandy ground for the runway show. The artist were inspired by Baroque frescoes at the 13th-century Palazzo Monti, in Brescia, Italy, during their time as artists-in-residence. The flags have been on rotating display at various locations in Spain and New York and will be fixed to Loewe stores internationally throughout 2022.

Journalist and critic Evan Moffitt recorded that the tie-dyed fabric or translucent tulle flags have been shown as ad-hoc public installations on Fire Island Pines since 2018. The flags make appearance each year in August at the BOFFO Artist Residency Performance Festival.
